= 2025 Masters (snooker) =

Snooker tournament

2025 Johnstone's Paint Masters

Tournament information
- Dates: 12–19 January 2025
- Venue: Alexandra Palace
- City: London
- Country: England
- Organisation: World Snooker Tour
- Format: Non-ranking event
- Total prize fund: £1,015,000
- Winner's share: £350,000
- Highest break: Shaun Murphy (ENG) (147)

Final
- Champion: Shaun Murphy (ENG)
- Runner-up: Kyren Wilson (ENG)
- Score: 10–7

The 2025 Masters (officially the 2025 Johnstone's Paint Masters) was a professional non-ranking snooker tournament that took place from 12 to 19 January 2025 at Alexandra Palace in London, England. The second Triple Crown event of the 2024‍–‍25 season, following the 2024 UK Championship and preceding the 2025 World Snooker Championship, the tournament was the 51st edition of the Masters, which was first held in 1975. Organised by the World Snooker Tour and sponsored by Johnstone's Paint, the event was broadcast by the BBC domestically, by Discovery+ and Eurosport in Europe, and by other broadcasters worldwide. The winner received £350,000 from a total prize fund of £1,015,000.

The top 16 players in the snooker world rankings, as they stood after the 2024 UK Championship, were invited to the event. Ronnie O'Sullivan, who had defeated Ali Carter 10‍–‍7 in the previous year's final to win a record-extending eighth Masters title, withdrew on medical grounds and was replaced in the draw by Neil Robertson, who had been ranked 17th after the UK Championship. Si Jiahui and Chris Wakelin made their Masters debuts at the event. By reaching the semi-finals, Judd Trump broke O'Sullivan's record for the most prize money earned in a single season.

Shaun Murphy won the tournament, defeating Kyren Wilson 10‍–‍7 in the final to secure his second Masters title and fourth Triple Crown title. He became the 12th player to win the Masters multiple times. The tournament produced 20 century breaks, of which the highest was a maximum break by Murphy in his semi-final match against Mark Allen. It was the sixth maximum break in Masters history and the ninth of Murphy's professional career.

== Overview ==
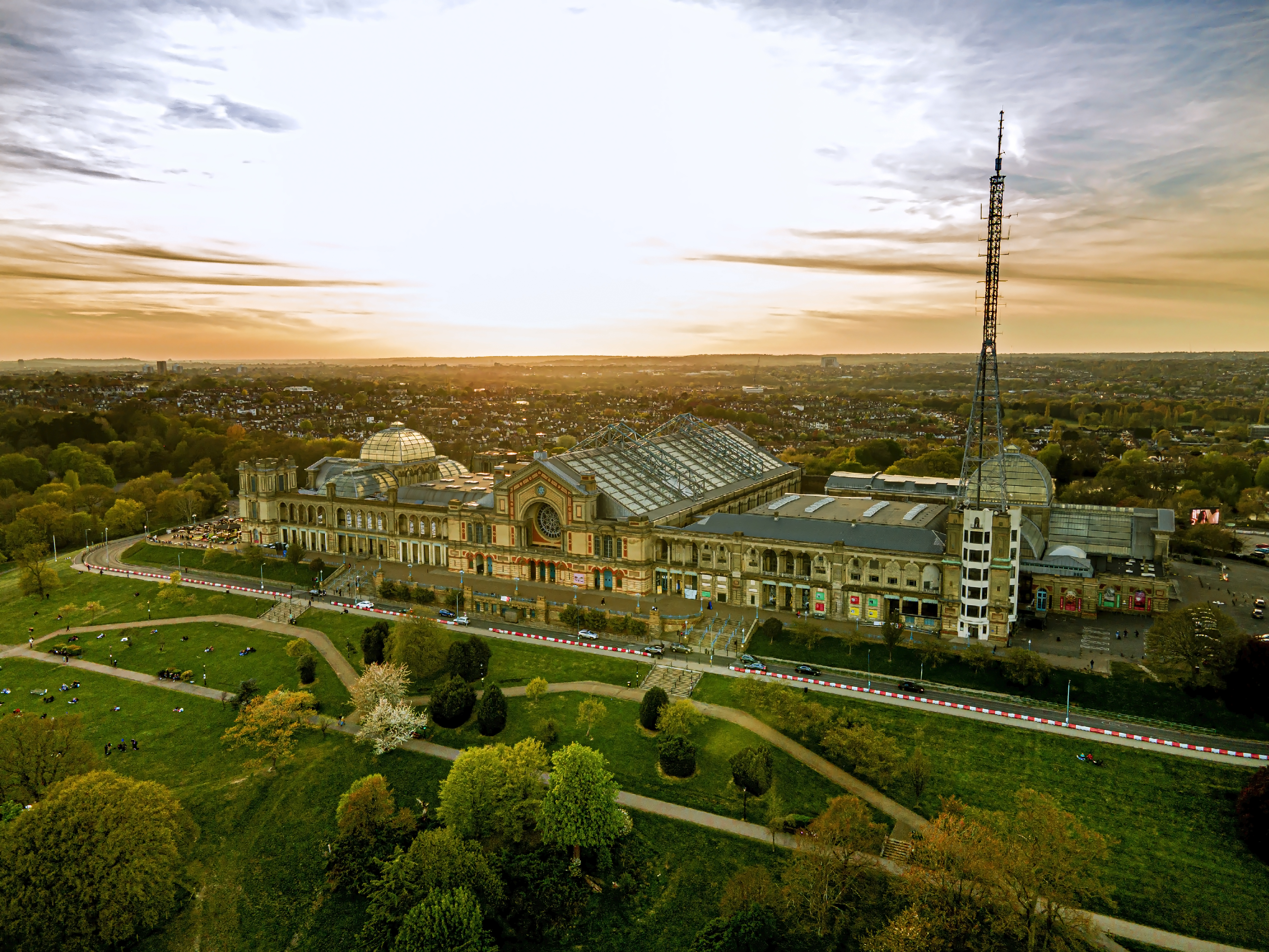
The event was held at Alexandra Palace in London.

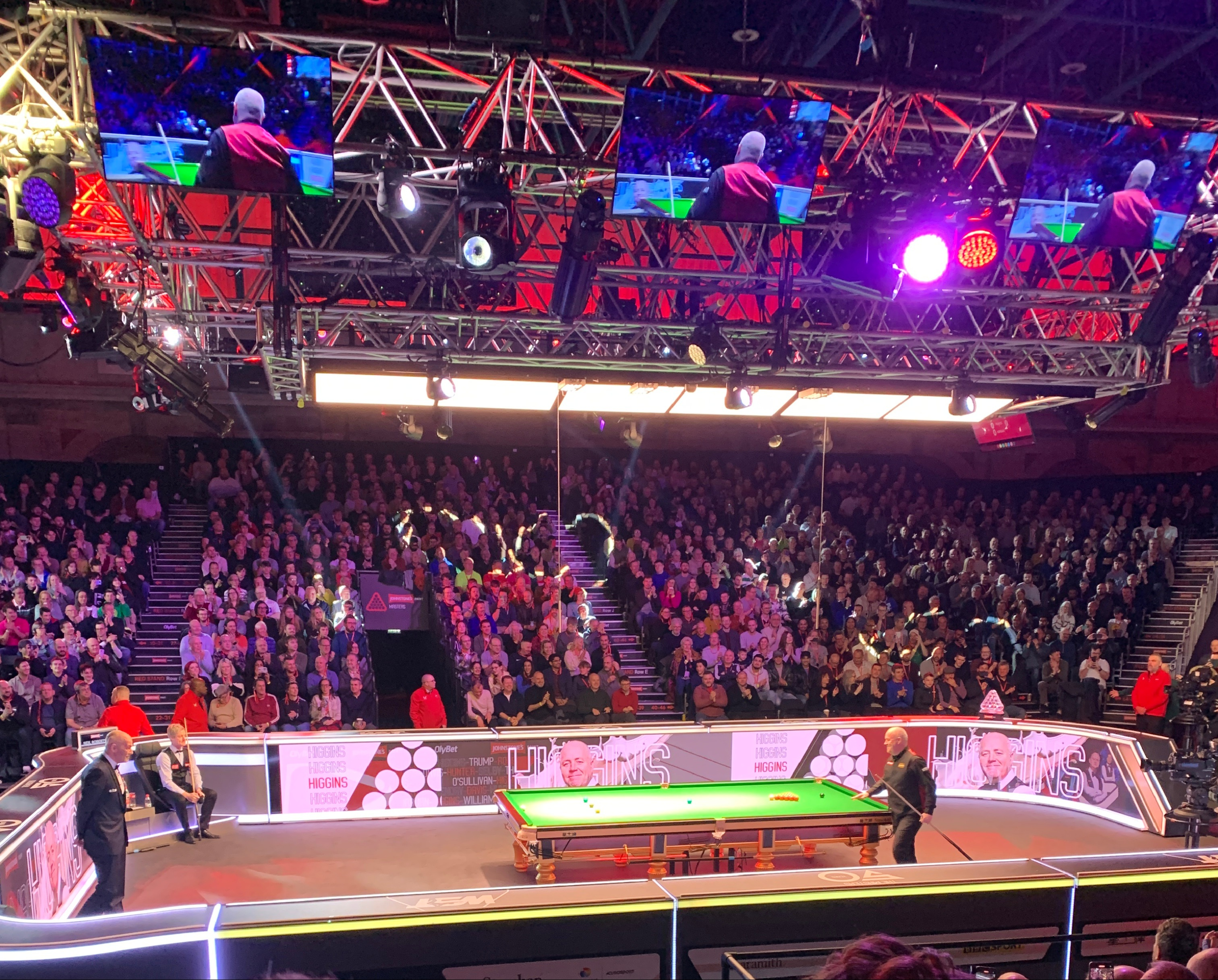
The arena at the start of tournament. Neil Robertson is seated, and John Higgins is walking past the table.

The 2025 Masters was a professional non-ranking snooker tournament that took place from 12 to 19 January 2025 at Alexandra Palace in London, England. The second Triple Crown event of the 2024‍–‍25 season, following the 2024 UK Championship and preceding the 2025 World Snooker Championship, the tournament was the 51st edition of the Masters, which was first held in 1975 for 10 invited players at the West Centre Hotel in London. John Spencer won the inaugural event, defeating Ray Reardon on a re-spotted black in the deciding frame of the final. The second-oldest professional snooker tournament, after the World Snooker Championship, the Masters had been staged at Alexandra Palace since 2012. (Note: The 2021 event moved to the Marshall Arena in Milton Keynes, England, due to the COVID-19 pandemic.)

As of 2025, Ronnie O'Sullivan was the most successful player in the tournament's history, having won the title eight times. O'Sullivan also held records as both the tournament's youngest and oldest winner, having won his first title in 1995, aged 19, and his eighth title in 2024, aged 48.

In 2016, the Masters trophy was renamed the Paul Hunter Trophy to honour the late three-time champion, who won the title in 2001, 2002, and 2004. Hunter died of cancer in 2006, aged 27.

=== Participants, draw and format ===
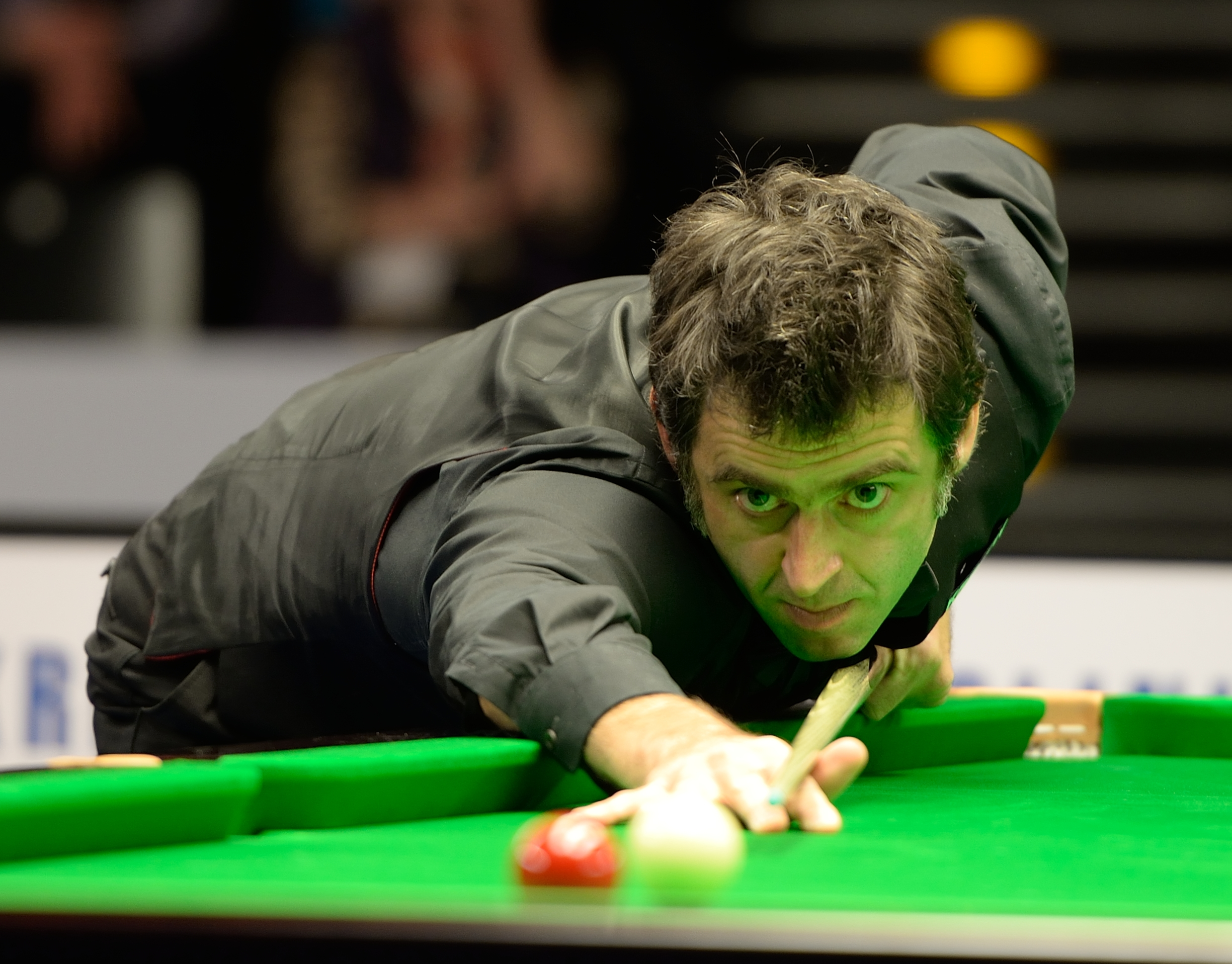
The previous year's winner Ronnie O'Sullivan (pictured in 2015) withdrew on medical grounds.

The original invitees to the event were the top 16 players in the snooker world rankings, as they stood after the 2024 UK Championship. Si Jiahui and Chris Wakelin, who both entered the top 16 for the first time in the 2024‍–‍25 season, made their Masters debuts. Neil Robertson, ranked 17th after the UK Championship, was set to miss the tournament for the first time since 2018. However, O'Sullivan, who had won his record-extending eighth Masters title at the previous year's event by defeating Ali Carter 10‍–‍7 in the final, withdrew from the tournament on medical grounds. Robertson replaced O'Sullivan in the draw.

The draw for the tournament was made during the final of the 2024 UK Championship, where the top eight seeds were drawn at random against players seeded 9 through 16. Matches were played as the best of 11 frames until the final, which was played as the best of 19 frames, held over two sessions.

=== Broadcasters and viewership ===
The tournament was broadcast in the United Kingdom by the BBC, BBC iPlayer and the BBC Sport website and in Europe (including the UK and Ireland) by Eurosport and Discovery+. It was broadcast in China by CCTV5, Huya, the CBSA-WPBSA Academy WeChat Channel and the CBSA-WPBSA Academy Douyin. It was broadcast in Hong Kong by Now TV, in Malaysia and Brunei by Astro SuperSport, in Taiwan by Sport Cast, in Thailand by TrueVisions, and in the Philippines by Premier Sports. In all other territories, the event was streamed by WST Play.

The event achieved 41.9 million live viewer hours across the BBC and Eurosport coverage in the UK, a 4 percent increase over the previous year. The BBC coverage achieved 39.9 million live viewer hours over 72.5 linear broadcast hours. Across mainland Europe, the Eurosport coverage attracted 23.7 million viewers, a 20 percent increase over the previous year. The BBC Two coverage of the evening session of the final was watched by an average of 1.5 million viewers, with a peak of 2 million viewers.

=== Prize money ===
The winner of the event received the Paul Hunter Trophy and £350,000 from a total prize pool of £1,015,000. The breakdown of prize money for the event is shown below:

- Winner: £350,000
- Runner-up: £140,000
- Semi-finals: £75,000
- Quarter-finals: £40,000
- Last 16: £25,000
- Highest break: £15,000 (Note: In addition to the highest break prize, any player making two maximum breaks during this season's Triple Crown events as well as the Saudi Arabia Snooker Masters, would be rewarded with a £147,000 bonus.)
- Total: £1,015,000

== Summary ==
=== First round ===
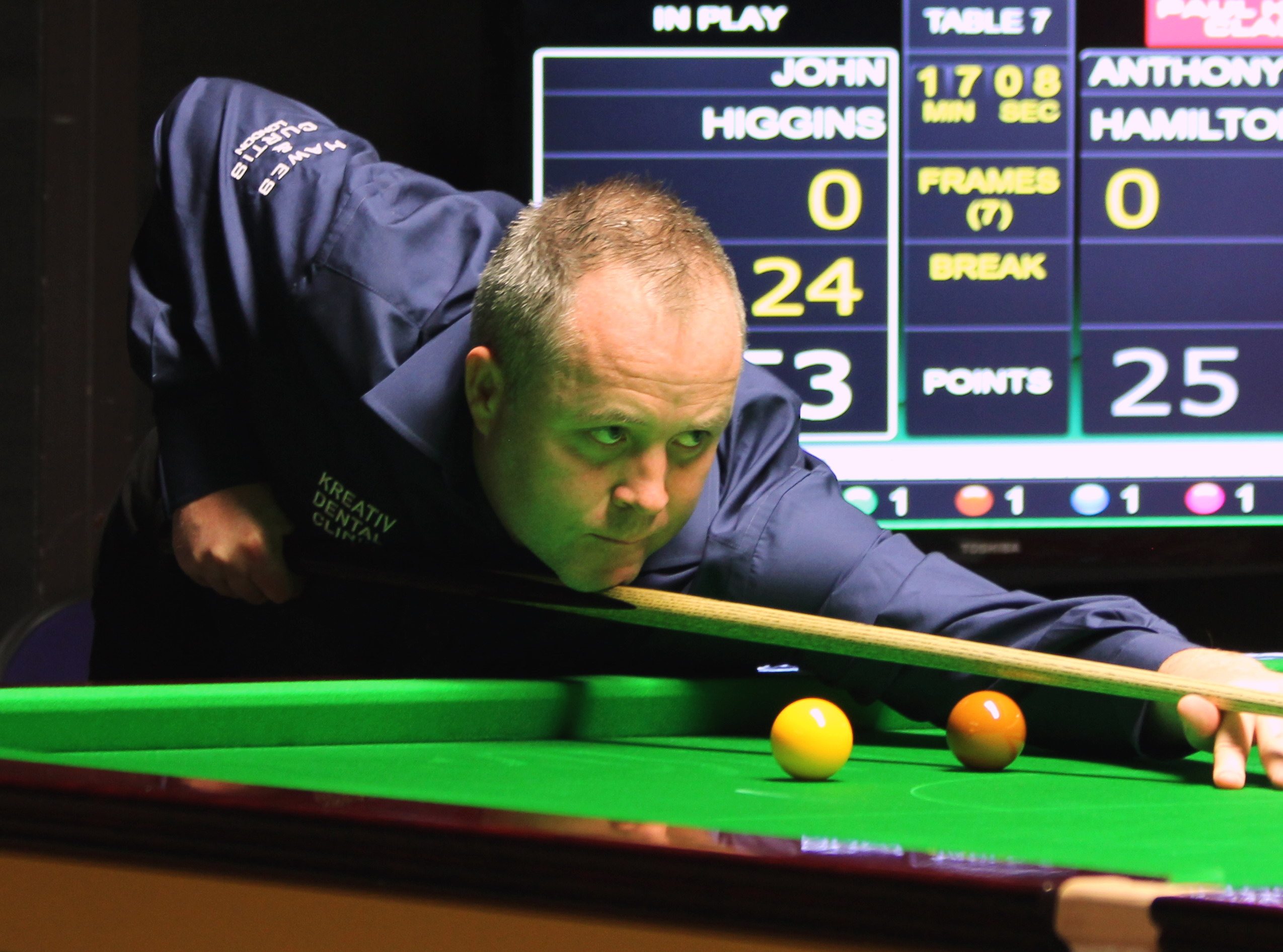
John Higgins (pictured in 2015) made a record-extending 31st Masters appearance, losing to Neil Robertson.

The first-round matches were played from 12 to 15 January as the best of 11 frames. Neil Robertson, who replaced Ronnie O'Sullivan in the draw, faced John Higgins, who made a record-extending 31st consecutive appearance at the event. It was the first time the two players had met at the Masters. Robertson won the first frame, but Higgins made six half-century breaks as he took a 5‍–‍1 lead. However, Robertson made breaks including 63, 118, and 80 as he tied the scores at 5‍–‍5 and then won the deciding frame after Higgins missed a pot while on a break of 35. Robertson's victory marked only the sixth time in the tournament's history that a player had recovered from 1–5 behind to win 6–5. It was Higgins's 16th first-round defeat at the Masters and the ninth time he had lost a deciding frame at the tournament, out of 11 played. "I don't think [Higgins] did a lot wrong. I played at my absolute best," Robertson said afterwards. Shaun Murphy faced Gary Wilson, who made his second Masters appearance and his first at Alexandra Palace. (Note: Gary Wilson made his Masters debut in 2021 which was played behind closed doors in Milton Keynes due to the COVID-19 pandemic.) Murphy produced breaks including 69, 56, and 64 as he took a 4‍–‍0 lead at the mid-session interval. Wilson then won three consecutive frames, making breaks including 101 and 92, as he reduced Murphy's lead to one at 4‍–‍3. However, Murphy took the eighth frame with a century break of 102 and also won the ninth to secure a 6‍–‍3 victory. Commenting afterwards on Wilson's comeback, Murphy said: "When it got to 4‍–‍3 it wasn't red alert, but it was yellow alert. So I was pleased to make a good break for 5‍–‍3." Wilson spoke about his ongoing struggle with the yips, saying "I couldn't even enjoy the occasion because I'm frustrated with the way I'm playing." He commented that "I'm getting to the end of my tether," saying: "My game's shot. My cue action's shot."

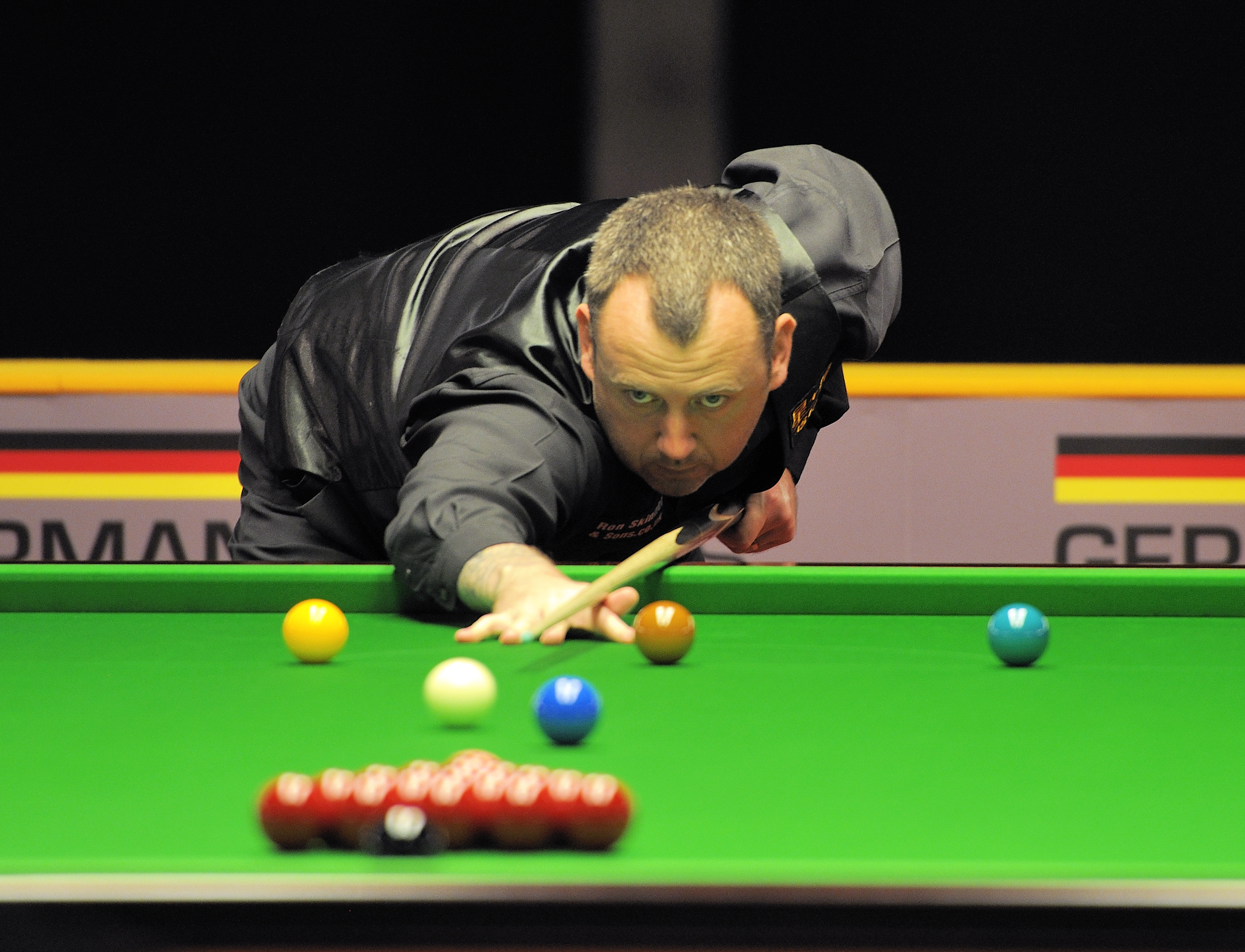
Mark Williams (pictured in 2014) lost to Ding Junhui. For the first time since 2011, no Class of '92 player reached the quarter-finals.

In the match between Mark Williams and Ding Junhui, the scores were tied at 2‍–‍2 at the mid-session interval. Williams took the fifth frame with a break of 70. Ding won frames six and seven with breaks of 60 and 64, but Williams produced a 136 century in the eighth to tie the scores at 4‍–‍4. Ding established a 66-point lead in the ninth but missed a black, after which Williams cleared the table to win the frame by one point and lead 5‍–‍4. However, Ding won the tenth frame and then made a 90 break in the decider to secure a 6‍–‍5 victory and reach his eighth Masters quarter-final. "My concentration and confidence [were] good after the interval. I didn't think too much about winning or losing," said Ding afterwards. Mark Selby played the previous year's runner-up Ali Carter. Selby won the first frame, helped by a 62 break, and won the 41-minute second frame after a safety exchange on the final brown. He then made breaks of 108 and 92 as he moved into a 4‍–‍0 lead at the mid-session interval. After requiring snookers, Selby almost managed to force a respotted black in the fifth, but Carter won the frame after Selby missed the final blue. In the sixth frame, Selby made his second century of the match, a 126, and went on to win the match 6‍–‍1 with a 53 clearance in the seventh. "I felt a bit edgy at the start but winning the second frame was huge," said Selby afterwards. "I kicked on after that and felt comfortable." Carter called his own performance "absolute rubbish."

Judd Trump, the world number one, played Barry Hawkins, whom he had defeated 10‍–‍8 in the 2024 UK Championship final the previous month. Trump moved into a 5‍–‍0 lead, twice taking advantage of foul shots that Hawkins committed while attempting to split the reds. Hawkins made a 70 break to win the sixth, but Trump made a 112 century in the seventh for a 6‍–‍1 victory. Trump's win meant that he had reached the quarter-finals in 19 of his last 20 tournaments. "I didn't do a lot wrong and punished his mistakes, I didn't miss anything easy," said Trump afterwards. Hawkins commented: "[Trump] is playing some great stuff and every time I made a mistake he capitalised." Facing Masters debutant Si Jiahui, Mark Allen won the 40-minute opening frame following a safety battle on the last red. Si took the second with a 103 century, but Allen made breaks of 111 and 70 to lead 3‍–‍1 at the mid-session interval. Si won the fifth, but Allen made a 94 break to win the sixth and also took the seventh to move one frame from victory at 5‍–‍2. After Si missed a red to a corner pocket in frame eight, Allen sealed a 6‍–‍2 victory with an 80 break, advancing to his tenth Masters quarter-final. "I played well, my safety was very good and I made it tough for him," commented Allen afterwards.

The reigning World Champion, Kyren Wilson, faced Zhang Anda, who was making his second Masters appearance. Wilson won the opening frame after a safety battle on the colours. Zhang leveled with an 85 break in the second, but Wilson took the third. Zhang established a 64-point advantage in the fourth frame before running out of position, and Wilson produced a 69 clearance to lead 3‍–‍1. Following the mid-session interval, Wilson failed to score for over 40 minutes as Zhang made breaks of 65 and 83, tying the scores at 3‍–‍3. Wilson made a 69 break to win frame seven, but Zhang responded with a 141 total clearance, his first century at the Masters and the highest break of the first round, to draw level again at 4‍–‍4. Leading by 52 points in frame nine, Wilson missed a pot on the blue to a baulk corner pocket. However, Zhang missed a black off its spot while on a break of 26, allowing Wilson to secure the frame and move one from victory at 5‍–‍4. With three reds remaining in the tenth frame, Wilson potted a red to a middle pocket and made a 38 break to secure a 6‍–‍4 victory. Wilson potted fewer balls in the match than his opponent, who outscored him cumulatively by 712 points to 437. Wilson said afterwards: "I feel like I managed to pinch the key frames." He praised Zhang, calling him "fantastic" and saying: "I have never seen such a consistent display of long potting." Zhang commented: "I needed a very strong performance and I was a little bit unlucky." Wilson advanced to his fifth Masters quarter-final and his first in three years, following first-round defeats in 2023 and 2024.

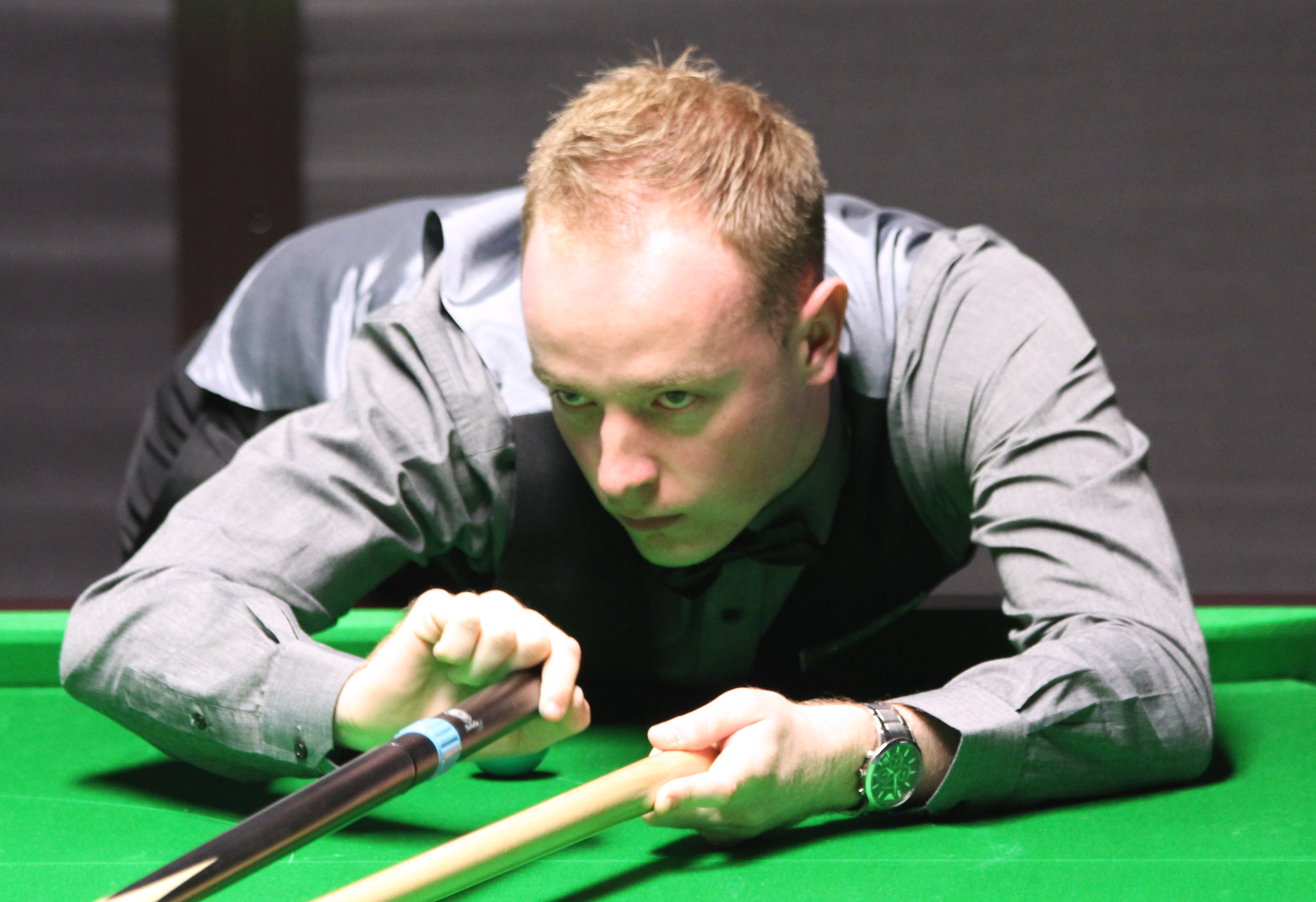
Chris Wakelin (pictured in 2016) made his Masters debut shortly after his first child was born eight weeks prematurely.

Luca Brecel, who had won only one match in his four previous Masters appearances, faced tournament debutant Chris Wakelin. Brecel came from behind to win the opening frame with a 36 clearance, including a pot on the last brown at pace along the baulk cushion that seven-time World Champion Stephen Hendry, commentating for the BBC, called "one of the best shots I have ever seen." Wakelin took the second frame with a 69 break, but Brecel won the next two frames, making an 89 break in the fourth, to lead 3‍–‍1 at the mid-session interval. Brecel established a 43-point lead in the fifth but missed a pot on a red, allowing Wakelin to take the frame with a 67 break. Brecel won frame six to lead 4‍–‍2, but Wakelin took the seventh after a safety battle on the last green. Frame eight was also decided on the colours, as Wakelin potted the last green but missed the brown, and Brecel made long pots on the brown, blue, and pink to secure a 5‍–‍3 lead. In frame nine, Wakelin fouled by touching a ball while positioning the rest, and Brecel made a 73 break to clinch a 6‍–‍3 victory. "It's tough to settle in this arena," said Brecel afterwards. "I played some good and bad frames but the most important thing was to get the win." Wakelin, whose partner had recently given birth to their first child eight weeks prematurely, commented: "I didn't play well, but the last few weeks have been very hectic and the last thing on my mind has been practising for this event. I tried my best."

=== Quarter-finals ===
The quarter-finals were played on 16 and 17 January as the best of 11 frames. Six of the quarter-finalists—Allen, Ding, Murphy, Robertson, Selby, and Trump—were former Masters champions, while the two other quarter-finalists, Brecel and Wilson, were the most recent winners of the World Snooker Championship, Brecel having won the title in 2023 and Wilson in 2024. The withdrawal of O'Sullivan and the first-round defeats of Higgins and Williams meant that, for the first time since the 2011 event, no player from the Class of '92 reached the quarter-finals. Facing Robertson, Murphy won the first frame with a 90 clearance after Robertson ran out of position on a break of 35. Robertson won the second frame with a 79 break, but Murphy took the next two to lead 3‍–‍1 at the mid-session interval. In frame five, Robertson lost position while on a break of 66 and then miscued while playing a safety shot. Murphy cleared to win the frame by one point and take a 4‍–‍1 lead. Robertson won frame six with a 108 century after Murphy missed a black off its spot, but Murphy won frame seven with an 82 break after Robertson missed a pot on the pink. Murphy attempted a maximum break in frame eight, potting 15 reds and 15 blacks before leaving the cue ball behind the blue, snookering himself on the yellow. Although the break ended on 120, Murphy secured a 6‍–‍2 victory and advanced to his seventh Masters semi-final. "It was just a terrible mistake to leave the cue ball behind the blue," Murphy said of his 147 attempt. "At the start of the season, making a 147 in a Triple Crown event was one of my goals. To get so close, I'm gutted." Robertson commented: "I could not believe it. It was a real shame for everyone watching."

Allen played Selby, their previous three Masters encounters all having gone to deciding frames. Allen won the first frame with an 81 break, but Selby took the second with a break of 88. Allen won the third with a 104 century and then recovered from 63 points behind to win the 58-minute fourth frame, establishing a 3‍–‍1 lead at the mid-session interval. Allen won frame five after a safety battle on the last red. The sixth frame came down to an 11-minute safety battle on the last black, which ended when Selby missed a cross double and left the black over a corner pocket. Allen potted the black to lead 5‍–‍1. Selby took the seventh frame with an 80 break, but Allen secured a 6‍–‍2 victory in the eighth, helped by a 59 break, to reach his fifth Masters semi-final. Calling Selby "probably the best player of all time when it comes to safety", Allen said: "That's probably the first time I feel I have dictated play against him. Especially on the safety side, I felt I was better than him, aside from the few bits of luck I had. That's a real positive for me to take forward." Selby, whose defeat meant that he had not reached the semi-final stage since the 2014 event, commented: "If I had won the fourth frame for 2‍–‍2, I was right in the match. After that I felt I was chasing the game. [Allen] won all of the close frames.... He took his chances better than I did."

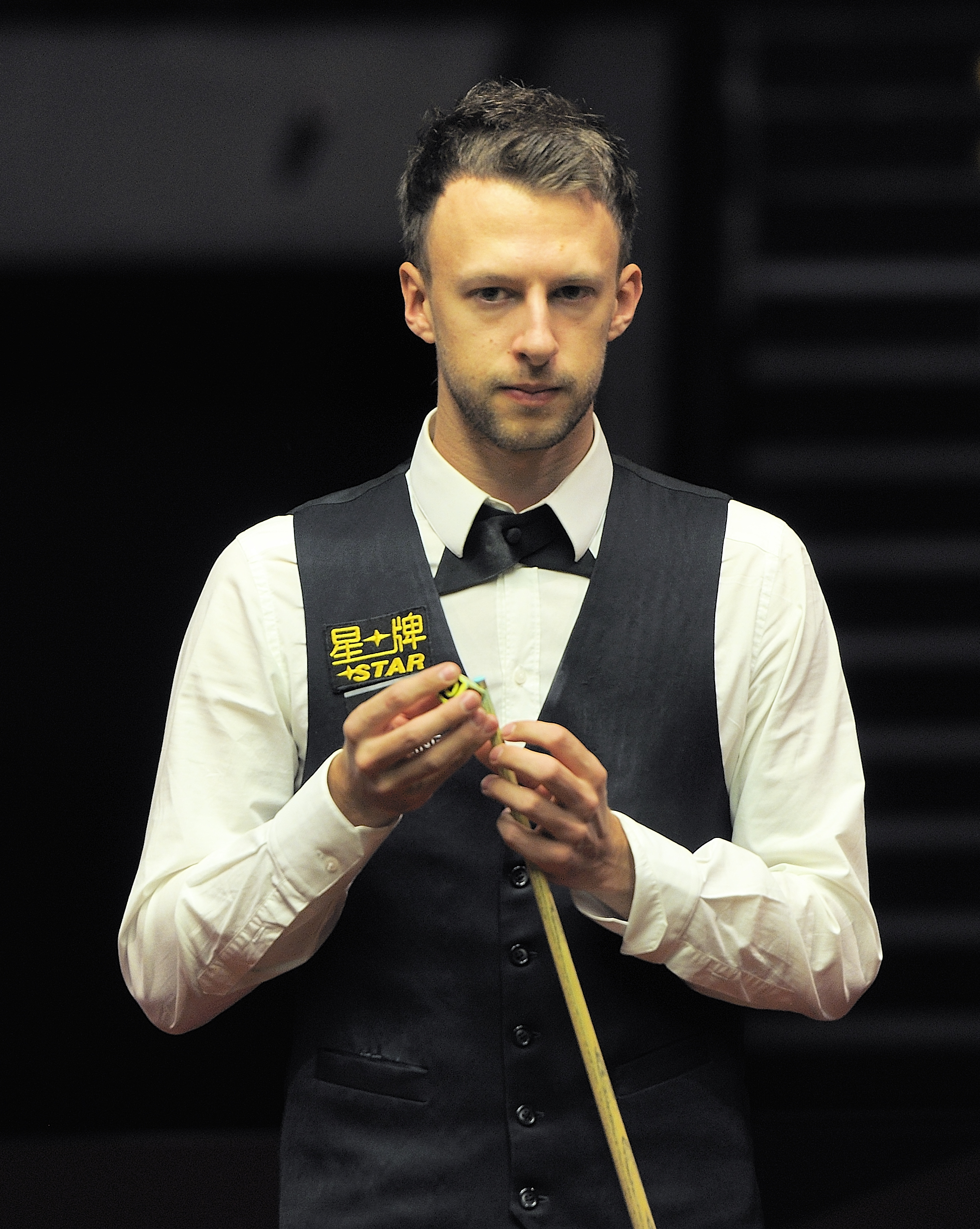
Judd Trump (pictured in 2014) surpassed Ronnie O'Sullivan's record for accumulated prize money in a single season.

Trump faced Ding in a match that produced breaks of 70 or more in seven of the nine frames played. Ding won the first two frames with breaks of 70 and 74. Trump made a 75 break to take the third frame but missed a red in the fourth while on a break of 48, and Ding made a 72 clearance to lead 3‍–‍1 at the mid-session interval. Trump made a 97 break to win the fifth frame. In the sixth, Ding missed a red with the rest while on a 35 break and did not pot another ball in the match thereafter. After leveling the scores at 3‍–‍3, Trump made breaks of 125, 62, and 75 to complete a run of five consecutive frames, clinching a 6‍–‍3 victory and reaching his seventh Masters semi-final. Trump's quarter-final win also meant that he surpassed the record £1,265,500 won by O'Sullivan in the 2023‍–‍24 season. "I'm somewhere near my peak," Trump said afterwards. "I just think it's the consistency, I'm able to have that inner belief over and over again. When I go behind 3‍–‍1, I still believe I can do what I did and rattle off five or 10 frames in a row without missing a single ball. That's what you have to do at this level." Ding commented: "I started well but missed some shots and [Trump] got more confidence. After that he made a lot of big breaks. The red in the sixth frame was careless, I was thinking about position and missed the pot."

Facing Brecel, Wilson had permission to wear trainers during the match, after suffering an ankle injury. Wilson won the first two frames with breaks of 71 and 67 before Brecel took the third with a 96 break. After Brecel missed a pot on the black in the fourth frame, Wilson made a 64 break to lead 3‍–‍1 at the mid-session interval. Brecel won frame five with an 84 break, but Wilson made a 78 in the sixth to move 4‍–‍2 ahead. In frame seven, Wilson missed a red with the rest, and Brecel won the frame with an 83 break. Wilson won the eighth to move one from victory at 5‍–‍3 and was leading 44‍–‍41 in the ninth when he missed the pink while trying to gain position on the yellow. Brecel cleared the colours to reduce his deficit to one frame for the fourth time in the match. The 42-minute tenth frame came down to a safety battle on the last pink, which Wilson eventually potted for a 6‍–‍4 victory, reaching his second Masters semi-final. "I rate that as one of the best wins of my career," Wilson said afterwards. "Not because of my performance, but because of what I had to deal with. I couldn't put weight on the ankle or stand how I usually would, which was frustrating. But I saw it as a challenge and something I had never had to deal with before, and it was a test for me to see how I could handle it." Wilson expressed frustration with Brecel's preference for old-style chalk, rather than the modern residue-free variety. "There's so much chalk dust in all of the cushions, all over the balls. There's chalk trails all over the cloth. I had the white cleaned God knows how many times tonight because I didn't want it to affect me," Wilson said. "I just don't understand [why Brecel uses] it."

=== Semi-finals ===
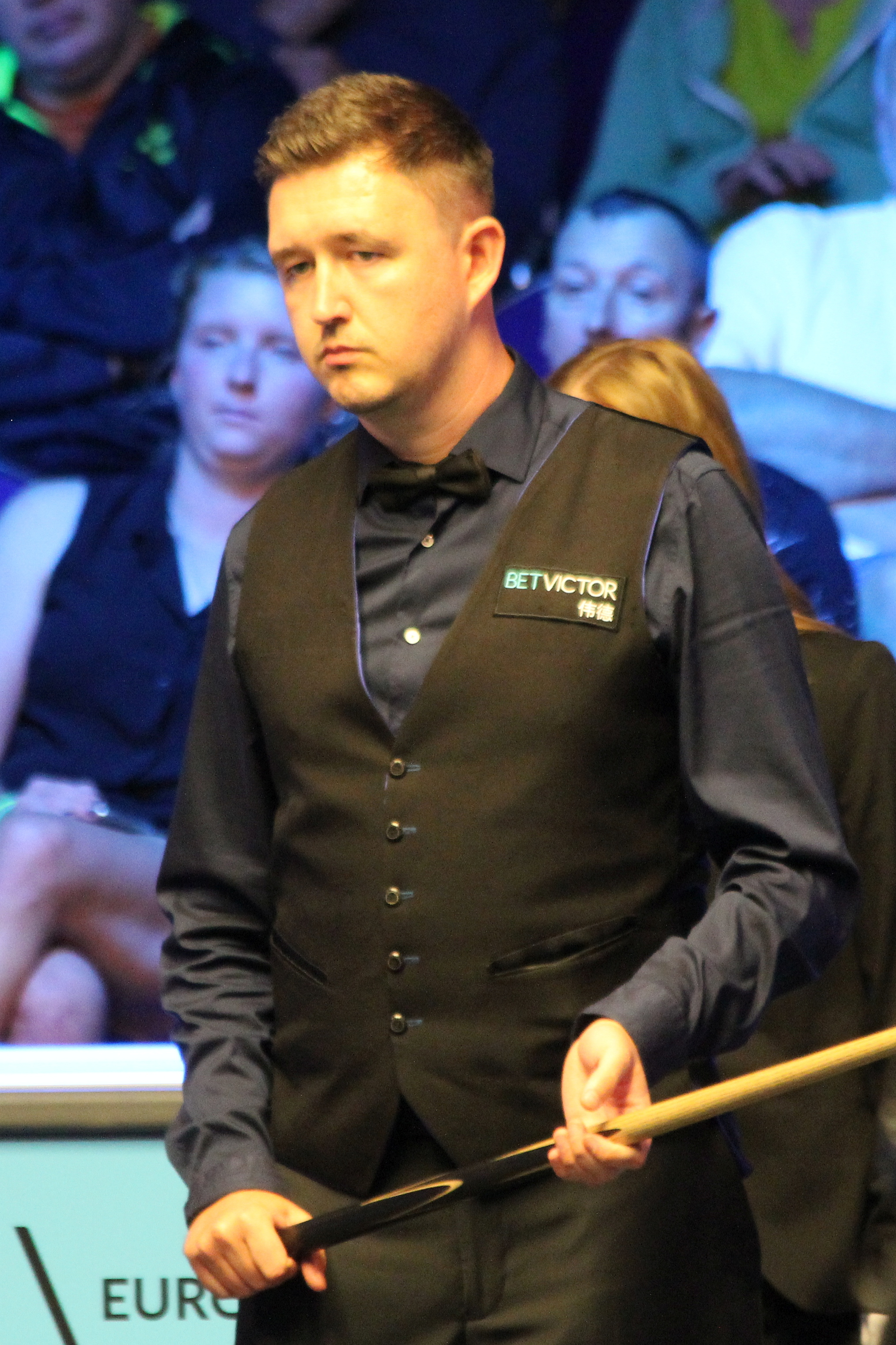
The reigning World Champion, Kyren Wilson, (pictured in 2022) defeated Judd Trump, the world number one, to reach his second Masters final.

The semi-finals were played on 18 January as the best of 11 frames. In the first semi-final, Murphy faced Allen. Allen won the first two frames, but Murphy tied the scores at 2‍–‍2 at the mid-session interval, making an 83 break in the fourth frame. Murphy also won the fifth frame, making a 54 break. In frame six, Murphy made a maximum break, the ninth of his professional career. He became the fifth player to make a maximum at the Masters, following Kirk Stevens, Ding (twice), Marco Fu, and Allen. After losing four consecutive frames, Allen came from 30 points behind in the seventh to win the frame with a 54 clearance, but Murphy took the eighth with a 72 break after Allen missed a red while attempting a plant. Murphy won a safety battle on the last green in the 33-minute ninth frame and secured a 6‍–‍3 victory. "I can't believe it. It was an incredible moment, one of the best of my snooker career," Murphy said of his maximum break. "I have wanted to make a 147 in one of the BBC [Triple Crown] events since I was a child. I had a great opportunity [in the quarter-finals] and totally messed it up. I had great support from the crowd, who were absolutely amazing." Allen said: "Once [Murphy] got to 73 on the 147 I was cheering him on because it's a very special thing to do, in front of this crowd. He held himself together really well. I was disappointed not to play my best."

In the second semi-final, Wilson faced Trump. Wilson took a 2‍–‍0 lead after winning the opening frame with a 61 break and the second with an 89 clearance. Wilson lost position in frame three while on a break of 44, and Trump won the frame with an 85 break. After Wilson missed the third last red in the fourth frame, Trump tied the scores at 2‍–‍2 at the mid-session interval. In frame five, Wilson made a 60 break but missed a pot on the last yellow with the long rest while leading by 23 points. Trump obtained 43 penalty points from snookers and won his third consecutive frame for a 3‍–‍2 lead. However, Wilson then won four consecutive frames with breaks of 76, 88, 85, and 106 to clinch a 6‍–‍3 victory. Over the last four frames, Wilson scored 355 points while Trump scored only 15. "I got into a rhythm and decided to be as positive as possible because you have to take your chances against [Trump]," Wilson said afterwards. "I'm really pleased with the way I finished the match off. I'm looking forward to the challenge of the final." Trump commented: "From 3‍–‍2 I didn't play well. I played some loose safeties... I missed some easy balls which I didn't miss in my first two matches. That threw me a bit and I didn't get much fluency."

=== Final ===
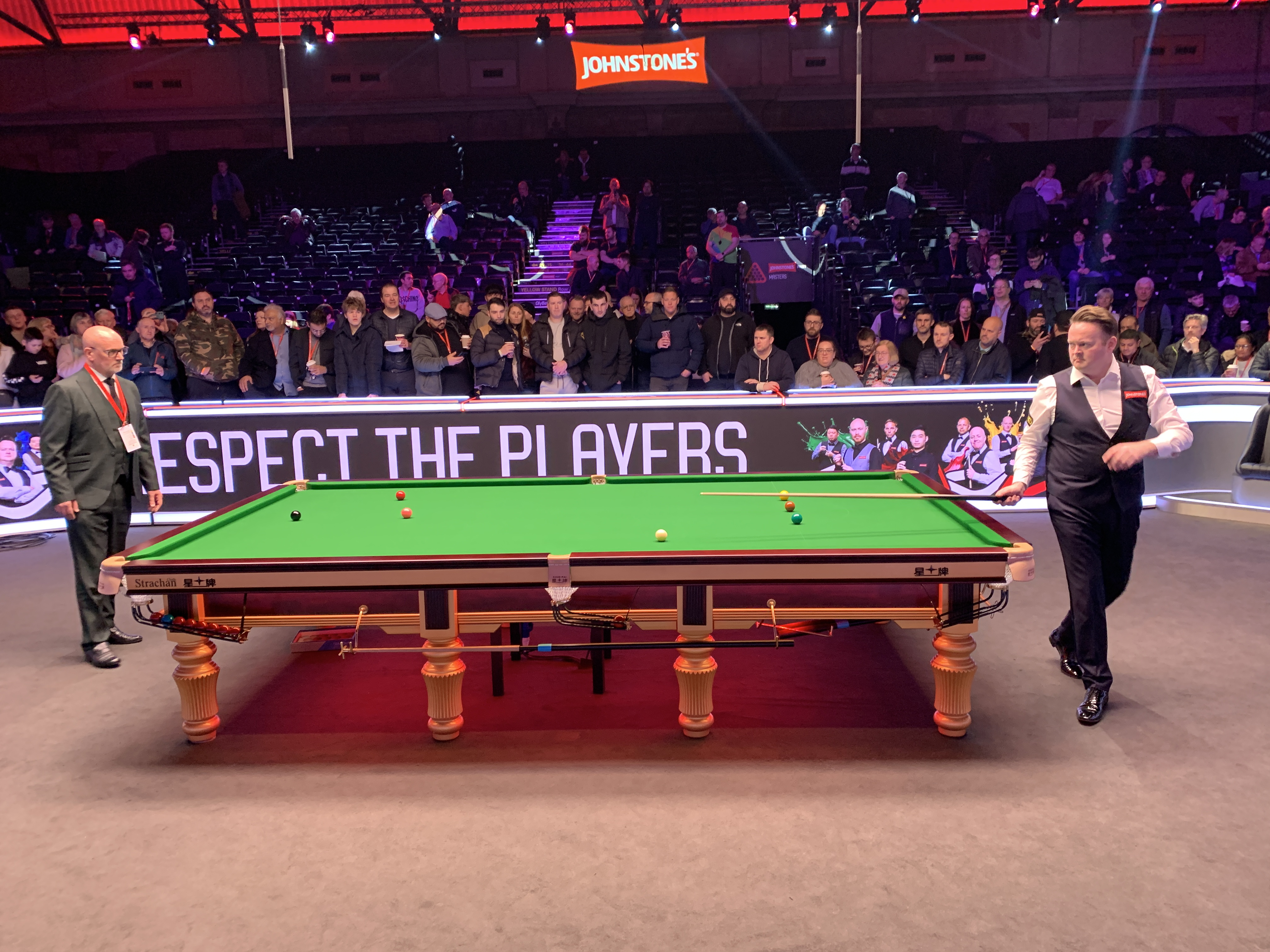
Shaun Murphy (pictured right) with his coach Peter Ebdon (left). Murphy won his second Masters title and fourth Triple Crown title. He also made the sixth maximum break in the history of the tournament.

The final took place on 19 January as the best of 19 frames, played over two sessions, between Murphy and Wilson. Murphy competed in his third Masters final, having won the title in 2015 and been runner-up in 2012, while Wilson contested his second, having been runner-up in 2018. The final was officiated by Olivier Marteel. In the afternoon session, Murphy won the first frame with a 94 break and also won the second, but Wilson took the third with a break of 69. In the fourth frame, Wilson missed a red while on a break of 61, and Murphy made a 65 clearance to move 3‍–‍1 ahead at the mid-session interval. Murphy also won the fifth frame and was ahead in the sixth when he missed a plant; Wilson won the frame with a 53 clearance. However, Murphy won the last two frames of the session with back-to-back centuries of 134 and 116 to lead 6‍–‍2.

In the evening session, Wilson won the ninth frame with breaks of 48 and 44, but Murphy made a 125 century to take the tenth. Wilson won the 11th frame with a 95 break, but Murphy made a 66 break in the 12th to lead 8‍–‍4 at the mid-session interval. Wilson then won three consecutive frames, making breaks including 78 and 65, as he reduced Murphy's lead to one at 8‍–‍7. Having scored only one point in the previous three frames, Murphy made a 55 break to move 9‍–‍7 in front and then made a 100 break, his fourth century of the final, to secure a 10‍–‍7 victory. It was Murphy's second Masters title, making him the 12th player to win the tournament multiple times, and his fourth Triple Crown title. "I can't believe it—I'm in shock," Murphy said afterwards. "When I lost to Mark Selby in the [2021 World Championship final], I thought my days in the business end of these events had gone." Murphy credited coach and mentor Peter Ebdon with helping him "rediscover that self-belief." Wilson, who finished runner-up at the tournament for a second time, commented: "I gave [Murphy] too much of a head start. Perhaps there was a bit of fatigue after a late finish last night. [Murphy] used his experience. I'm proud that I managed to dig in deep."

== Tournament draw ==
The draw of the tournament is shown below. Numbers in parentheses after the players' names denote the players' seedings, and players in bold denote match winners.

**First round** Best of 11 frames
**Neil Robertson (AUS) (Note: Neil Robertson replaced first seed Ronnie O'Sullivan who withdrew.)**	**6**
John Higgins (SCO) (15)	5
**Shaun Murphy (ENG) (8)**	**6**
Gary Wilson (ENG) (11)	3
**Mark Allen (NIR) (5)**	**6**
Si Jiahui (CHN) (14)	2
**Mark Selby (ENG) (4)**	**6**
Ali Carter (ENG) (12)	1
**Judd Trump (ENG) (3)**	**6**
Barry Hawkins (ENG) (13)	1
Mark Williams (WAL) (6)	5
**Ding Junhui (CHN) (9)**	**6**
**Luca Brecel (BEL) (7)**	**6**
Chris Wakelin (ENG) (16)	3
**Kyren Wilson (ENG) (2)**	**6**
Zhang Anda (CHN) (10)	4

**Quarter-finals**; Best of 11 frames
Neil Robertson (AUS)	2
**Shaun Murphy (ENG) (8)**	**6**
**Mark Allen (NIR) (5)**	**6**
Mark Selby (ENG) (4)	2
**Judd Trump (ENG) (3)**	**6**
Ding Junhui (CHN) (9)	3
Luca Brecel (BEL) (7)	4
**Kyren Wilson (ENG) (2)**	**6**

**Semi-finals**; Best of 11 frames
**Shaun Murphy (ENG) (8)**	**6**
Mark Allen (NIR) (5)	3
Judd Trump (ENG) (3)	3
**Kyren Wilson (ENG) (2)**	**6**

**Final**; Best of 19 frames
**Shaun Murphy (ENG) (8)**	**10**
Kyren Wilson (ENG) (2)	7

=== Final ===
Final
Final: Best of 19 frames. Referee: Olivier Marteel; Alexandra Palace, London, England, 19 January 2025
**Shaun Murphy** (8); England	**10**–7	Kyren Wilson (2); England
Afternoon: **98**–0, **78**–4, 8–**77**, **66**–61, **72**–21, 30–**77**, **134**–0 (134), **116**–13 (116); Evening: 5–**99**, **125**–8 (125), 0–**101**, **75**–14, 0–**101**, 1–**87**, 0–**73**, **96**–8, **115**–1 (100)
(frame 7) **134**	Highest break	95 (frame 11)
**4**	Century breaks	0

== Century breaks ==
A total of 20 century breaks were made during the tournament.

- 147, 134, 125, 120, 116, 103, 100 – Shaun Murphy
- 141 – Zhang Anda
- 136 – Mark Williams
- 126, 108 – Mark Selby
- 125, 112 – Judd Trump
- 118, 108 – Neil Robertson
- 111, 104 – Mark Allen
- 106 – Kyren Wilson
- 103 – Si Jiahui
- 101 – Gary Wilson
