= Tatiana Woollaston =

Snooker referee

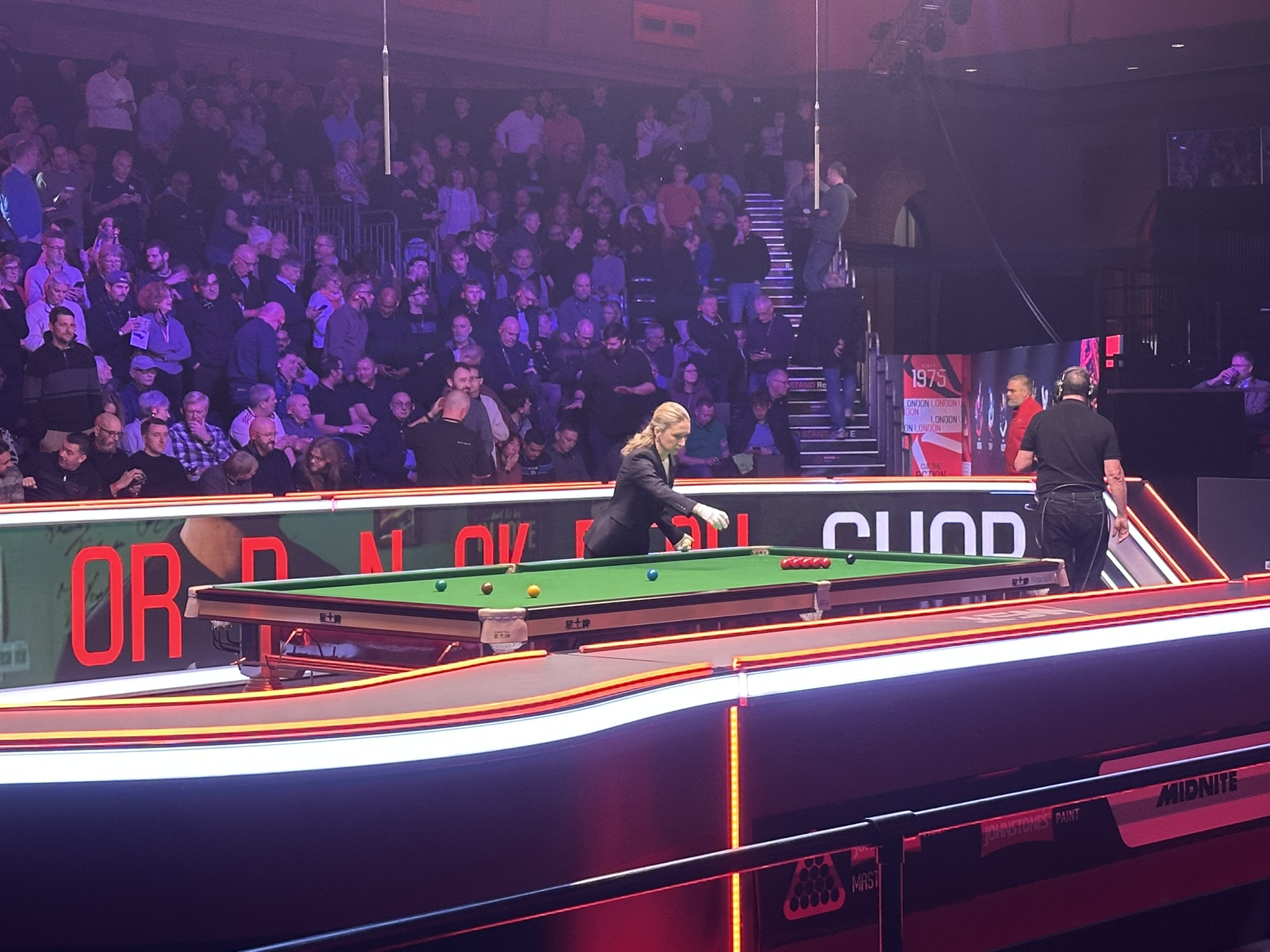
- Tatiana Woollaston officiating at the 2026 Masters.

Personal information
- Born: 8 November 1986 (age 39) Pinsk, Byelorussian SSR, Soviet Union

Sport
- Country: Belarus
- Sport: Snooker
- Professional: 2010–present

Tatiana Woollaston (née Torchilo; (Note: Alternative spelling Tarchyla; Belarusian: Таццяна Тарчыла, romanized: Tatstsiana Tarchyla) born 8 November 1986) is a professional snooker referee. She is an official referee of the WPBSA, EASB, EBSA and BSF.

== Career ==
=== Snooker referee ===
In March 2008, Woollaston started refereeing amateur snooker events in Belarus. She qualified as a Class 3 snooker referee a year later in March 2009, during European Team Snooker Championship in St. Petersburg, Russia, and became a referee member of European Billiards and Snooker Association. In May 2010, she refereed the European Individual Snooker Championship in Bucharest, Romania. Woollaston made her ranking tournament debut in August 2010 at European Players Tour Championships event one (Paul Hunter Classic 2010) in Fürth, Germany.

On 21 November 2010, Woollaston became the first referee from Eastern Europe to officiate at a world-ranking snooker semi-final at the Euro Players Tour Championship event six in Prague, the Czech Republic, as John Higgins defeated Joe Jogia by 4 frames to 2.

In 2011, Woollaston qualified as a Class 2 snooker referee, and joined EASB as an official referee.

She refereed her 1st Triple Crown final at the 2024 UK Championship.

== Personal life ==
She graduated from Belarus State Economic University, where she studied finance, banking and credit. She received a master's degree in economics. Before moving to the UK, she worked as a teacher at Belarus State Economic University in Minsk.

She married Ben Woollaston, a professional snooker player, in June 2011. Later that year, she moved to the UK, and now lives with her husband in Leicester, England. Her husband had won the Players Tour Championship event three in Sheffield the day before she moved to the UK. They have two sons, born on 8 November 2012 and 21 October 2017.
