= 2024 UK Championship =

Snooker tournament

2024 Victorian Plumbing UK Championship

Tournament information
- Dates: 23 November – 1 December 2024
- Venue: York Barbican
- City: York
- Country: England
- Organisation: World Snooker Tour
- Format: Ranking event
- Total prize fund: £1,205,000
- Winner's share: £250,000
- Highest break: Zhang Anda (CHN) (147)

Final
- Champion: Judd Trump (ENG)
- Runner-up: Barry Hawkins (ENG)
- Score: 10‍–‍8

The 2024 UK Championship (officially the 2024 Victorian Plumbing UK Championship) was a professional snooker tournament that took place from 23 November to 1 December 2024 at the York Barbican in York, England. The 48th edition of the UK Championship, it was the ninth ranking event of the 2024‍–‍25 season and the first of the season's three Triple Crown events, preceding the 2025 Masters and the 2025 World Snooker Championship. Organised by the World Snooker Tour and sponsored by Victorian Plumbing, the event was broadcast by the BBC domestically, by Discovery+ and Eurosport in Europe, and by other broadcasters worldwide. The winner received £250,000 from a total prize fund of £1,205,000.

The top 16 players in the snooker world rankings were seeded through to the main stage of the competition. An additional 128 players competed in a four‑round qualifying tournament from 16 to 21 November at the Mattioli Arena in Leicester, with higher ranked players given byes to the later qualification rounds. The reigning World Women's Snooker Champion Bai Yulu won her first three qualifying matches, the first female player to win three matches at a professional ranking tournament; she lost to Jack Lisowski in the last qualifying round. The 16 successful qualifiers advanced to the main stage in York, where they were drawn at random against the 16 seeded players.

The defending champion was Ronnie O'Sullivan, who had defeated Ding Junhui 10‍–‍7 in the final of the 2023 event; he lost 4‍–‍6 to qualifier Barry Hawkins in the first round. Judd Trump won the tournament, defeating Hawkins 10‍–‍8 in the final to secure his second UK Championship title, having previously won the 2011 event. This was Trump's 30th ranking title and his fifth Triple Crown title. The tournament produced a total of 128 century breaks, 83 made in qualifying matches and 45 during the main stage. The highest was a maximum break compiled by Zhang Anda in his first‑round match against Lei Peifan.

== Format ==
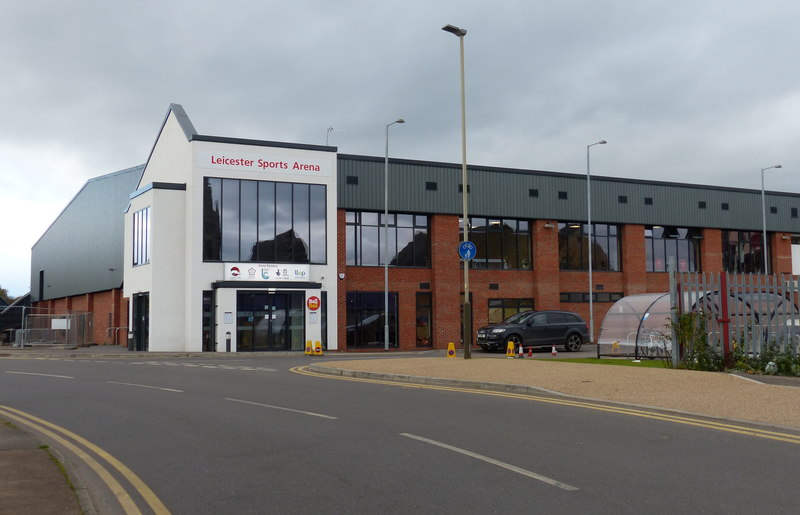
Qualifying took place in the Mattioli Arena in Leicester, England.

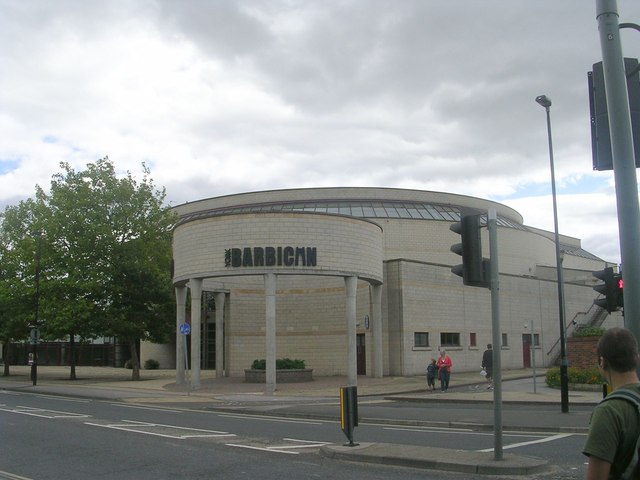
The main stage of the event was played at the York Barbican in York, England.

The event took place from 23 November to 1 December at the York Barbican in York, England. The ninth ranking event of the 2024‍–‍25 season, following the 2024 International Championship and preceding the 2024 Snooker Shoot Out, the tournament was the 48th edition of the UK Championship, which was first held in 1977 as the United Kingdom Professional Snooker Championship. For the tournament's first seven years, only United Kingdom residents or passport holders were eligible to compete. At the 1984 event, the UK Championship became a ranking tournament open to players of any nationality. The first Triple Crown event of the season, it preceded the 2025 Masters and the 2025 World Snooker Championship.

The event used a format adopted since the 2022 edition, which is similar to the format of the World Championship. The top 16 players in the snooker world rankings were seeded through to the round of 32. An additional 128 players—comprising professionals ranked outside the top 16 and leading amateur players from the Q Tour and other amateur events—competed in a four‑round qualifying tournament from 16 to 21 November at the Mattioli Arena in Leicester, with higher ranked players given byes to the later rounds. The 16 successful qualifiers advanced to the round of 32, where they were drawn at random against the top 16 seeds.

All matches were played as the best of 11 frames up to the final, which was the best of 19 frames played over two sessions. The defending champion was Ronnie O'Sullivan, who won his record‑extending eighth UK Championship title in 2023, defeating China's Ding Junhui 10‍‍–‍7 in the final. The 2021 winner Zhao Xintong, whose 20‑month ban for match‑fixing offences expired on 1 September 2024, was among the amateur players invited as a WPBSA qualifier after he won Q Tour Event 3 in October 2024.

The title sponsor for the event was Victorian Plumbing, with additional sponsorship from All British Casinos and LP Cues.

=== Broadcasters and viewership ===
The qualifying matches were broadcast by Discovery+ in Europe (including the United Kingdom and Ireland); starting from 18 November, the matches were additionally available worldwide (except for China) on World Snooker Tour's Facebook and YouTube channels, with live commentary provided for one table. The fourth and final round of qualifiers, dubbed "Judgement Day", featured live commentary on all four tables, with roving coverage. The World Snooker Tour reported that the qualifiers had received almost three million views on Facebook and YouTube combined, nearly double the previous year's figures.

The main stage was broadcast domestically in the United Kingdom by the BBC, BBC iPlayer and the BBC Sport website; by Eurosport and Discovery+ in Europe (including the United Kingdom and Ireland); by CCTV-5, the CBSA-WPBSA Academy WeChat Channel, the CBSA-WPBSA Academy Douyin and Huya Live in China; by Now TV in Hong Kong; by Astro SuperSport in Malaysia and Brunei; by True Sports in Thailand; by Sportcast in Taiwan; and by Premier Sports in the Philippines. Coverage was available from Matchroom Sport in all other territories.

=== Prize fund ===
The breakdown of prize money for the event is as shown:

- Winner: £250,000
- Runner-up: £100,000
- Semi-finalists: £50,000
- Quarter-finalists: £25,000
- Last 16: £15,000
- Last 32: £10,000
- Last 48: £7,500
- Last 80: £5,000
- Last 112: £2,500
- Highest break: £15,000 (Note: In addition to the highest break prize, any player making two maximum breaks during this season's Triple Crown events as well as the Saudi Arabia Snooker Masters, would have been rewarded with a £147,000 bonus.)
- Total: £1,205,000

== Summary ==
=== Qualifying ===
==== Qualifying round one ====
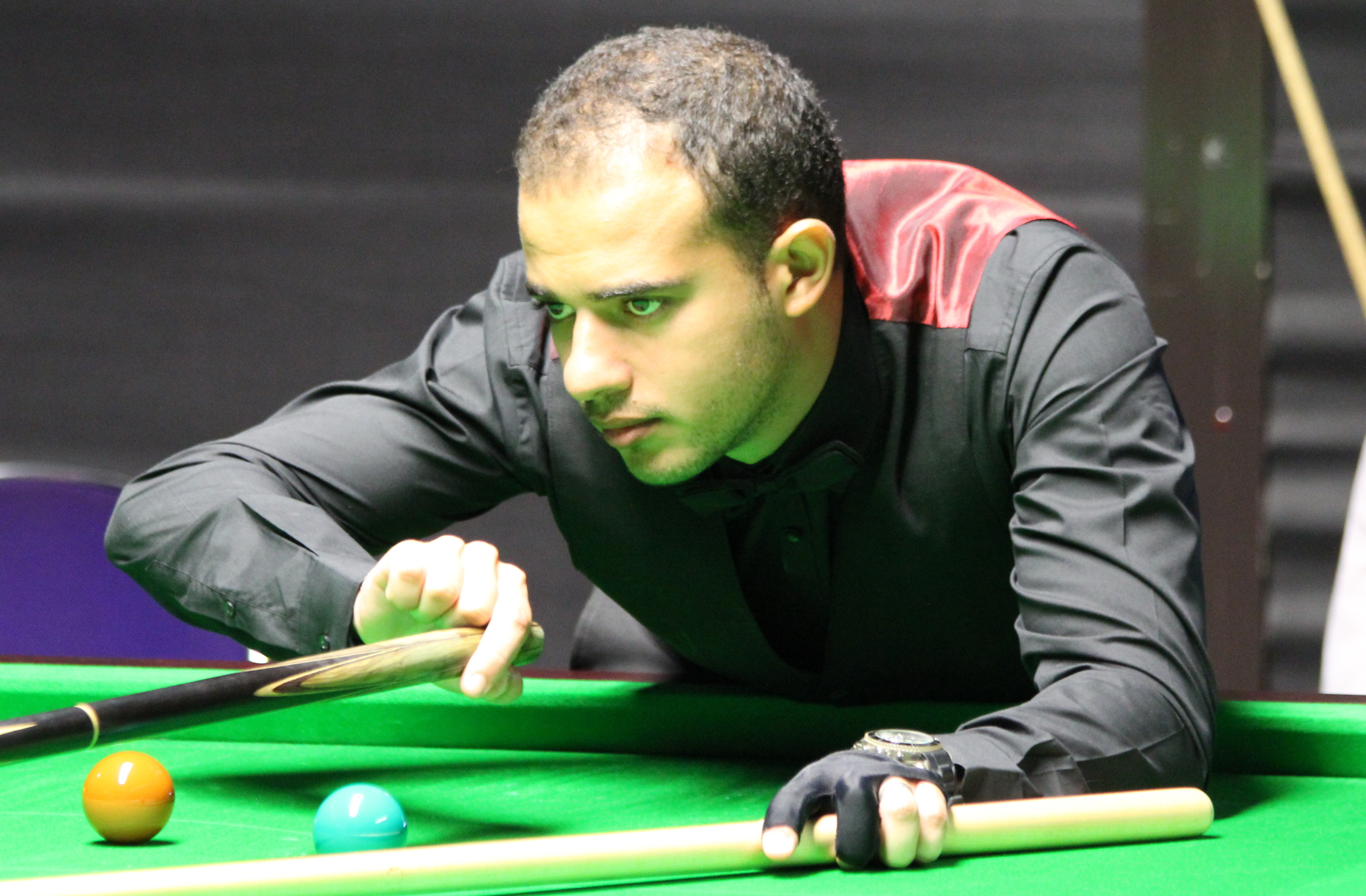
African Champion Hatem Yassen (pictured in 2016) whitewashed women's world number one Mink Nutcharut, recording his first win since regaining his tour card.

In the first qualifying round, reigning World Women's Champion Bai Yulu recovered from 1‍–‍3 down to defeat Farakh Ajaib 6‍–‍4, making four breaks over 50. Liam Davies missed the final pink of an attempted maximum break in the fourth frame of his 6‍–‍3 win over Ahmed Aly Elsayed. From 2‍–‍3 behind against Sunny Akani, the 2021 champion Zhao Xintong won four consecutive frames for a 6‍–‍3 victory. Zhao made a 146 break in the match, his highest on the professional tour. By beating Dean Young 6‍–‍3, Mohamed Shehab recorded his first win since regaining professional status in 2024, following a 17‑year absence from the tour. Former professional Iulian Boiko defeated Bulcsú Révész 6‍–‍3. Jimmy White, aged 62, defeated amateur player Paul Deaville 6‍–‍2, and reigning African champion Hatem Yassen completed a whitewash over Mink Nutcharut.

==== Qualifying round two ====
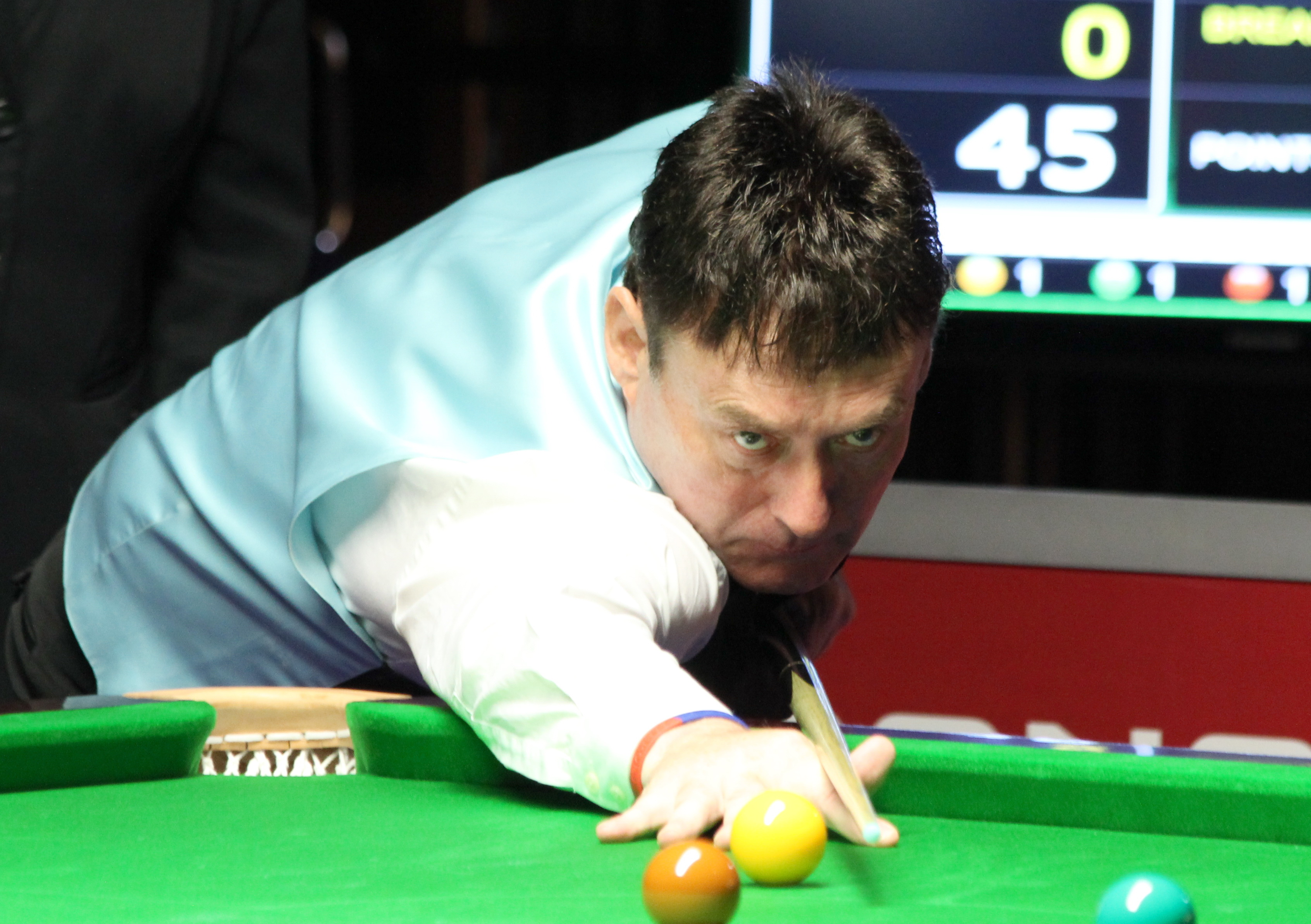
The 1992 winner Jimmy White (pictured in 2016) won his first qualifying match but lost 4‍–‍6 to Ross Muir in the second qualifying round.

In the second qualifying round, Bai defeated Jamie Jones 6‍–‍4, becoming the first woman since Kelly Fisher in 1999 to win back‑to‑back matches at a professional ranking event. Louis Heathcote whitewashed Shehab, and Artemijs Žižins defeated David Grace 6‍–‍3. Zhao defeated Jiang Jun 6‍–‍2 in a match that produced a break of at least 50 in every frame. The 1992 winner White lost 4‍–‍6 to Ross Muir, while 2003 champion Matthew Stevens defeated Thailand's Manasawin Phetmalaikul 6‍–‍4. Hong Kong's Marco Fu beat Iranian professional Amir Sarkhosh 6‍–‍1 while Antoni Kowalski defeated Anthony Hamilton 6‍–‍3. Graeme Dott lost 4‍–‍6 to Julien Leclercq, and He Guoqiang beat Robbie McGuigan 6‍–‍1.

==== Qualifying round three ====
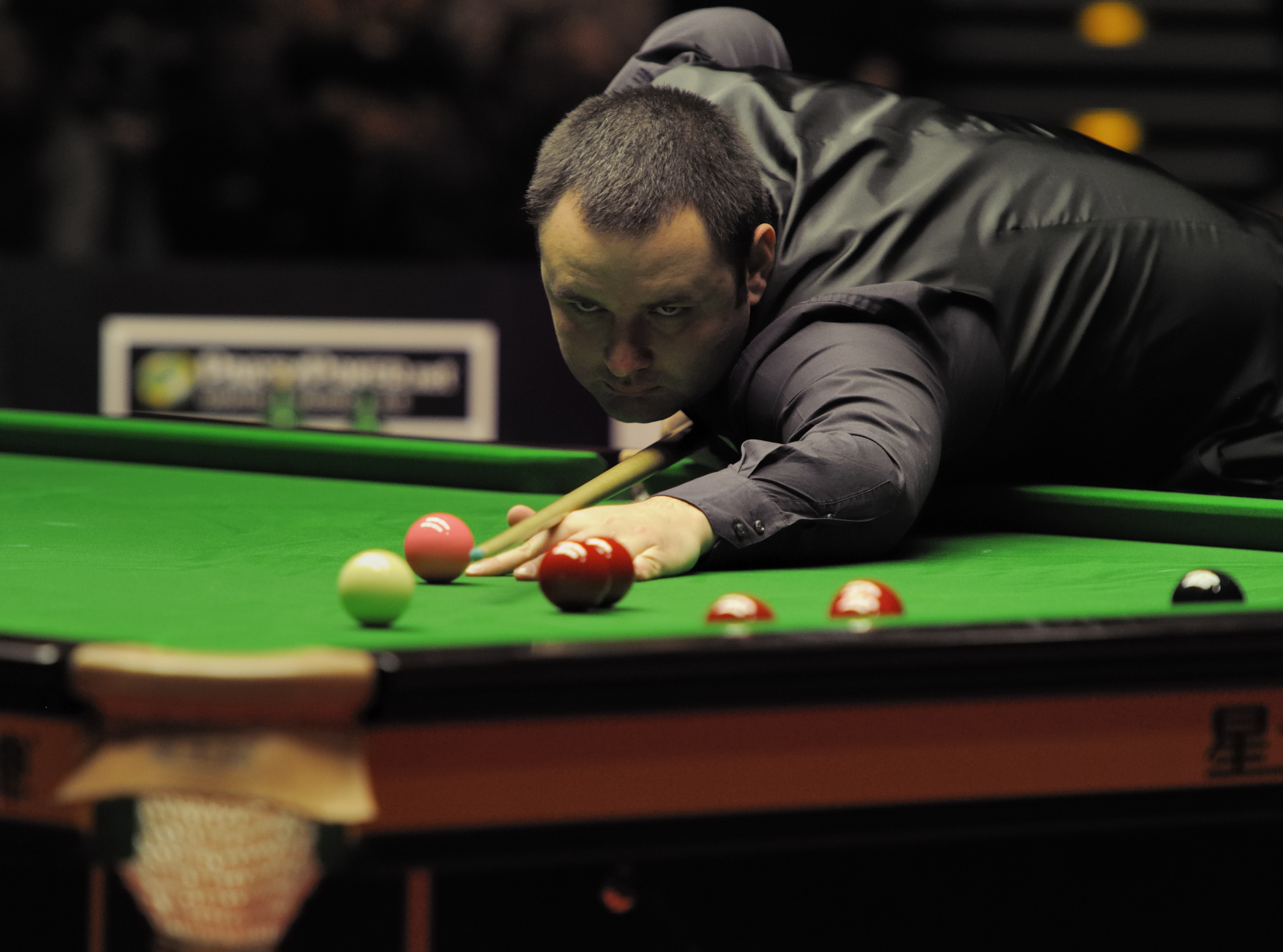
The 2004 winner Stephen Maguire (pictured in 2011) became the third player to record 100 century breaks at the UK Championship.

In the third qualifying round, Jack Lisowski defeated Rory Thor 6‍–‍4. In his 6‍–‍3 defeat of Žižins, Stephen Maguire became the third player (after Stephen Hendry and Ronnie O'Sullivan) to record 100 century breaks in the UK Championship. Jak Jones defeated Ian Burns 6‍–‍2, and Stuart Bingham defeated amateur Oliver Sykes 6‍–‍3. Bingham commented: "I'm not quite the player I was in 2015, there are a few yips in there and my arm gets tight sometimes. But I have played some very good matches this season."

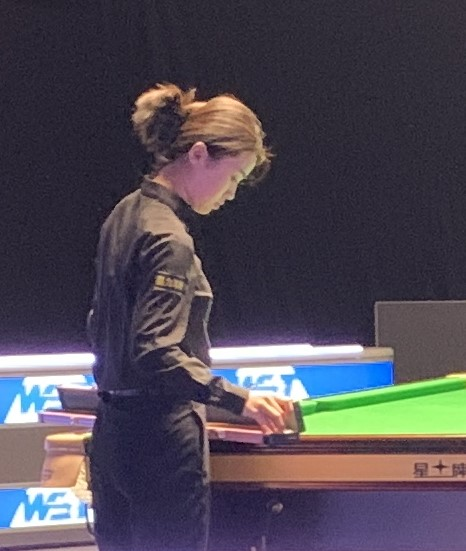
Bai Yulu became the first woman to win three matches at a professional ranking event.

Bai recovered from 3‍–‍5 behind to defeat Scott Donaldson 6‍–‍5, making breaks over 50 in each of the last three frames. Her victory made her the first woman to win three matches in a professional ranking event. She commented: "I was very nervous and I didn't think I would win, but I did well. I have learned a lot." After defeating Oliver Lines 6‍–‍5, three‑time UK Champion Neil Robertson commented: "My game is there, in a way it was good to have to dig deep tonight in a match where things were not going my way." After losing the first two frames to Noppon Saengkham, Zhao won six in a row for a 6‍–‍2 victory. Leclercq defeated Dominic Dale by the same score and commented afterwards: "It's all about experience for me and trying to improve on the tactical side." Zhou Yuelong won six consecutive frames to defeat Fu 6‍–‍3, and David Lilley beat Thepchaiya Un‑Nooh by the same score. Barry Hawkins beat Alfie Burden 6‍–‍1, and Wu Yize defeated Ashley Carty 6‍–‍2.

==== Qualifying round four ====
In the fourth and final qualifying round, branded as "Judgement Day", Maguire faced Elliot Slessor. Maguire went 4‍–‍2 ahead, making a highest break of 134, but Slessor drew level at 5‍–‍5. Maguire won the 59‑minute deciding frame after a long safety exchange on the colours and commented afterwards: "If I had lost that frame I don't know what I would have done—maybe given up. I was over the edge mentally." Bingham whitewashed Jimmy Robertson and said after the match: "I feel I am going in the right direction with my game." Jackson Page defeated Hossein Vafaei 6‍–‍2, commenting: "I have had some results recently and I am feeling good at the table." Jak Jones defeated Fan Zhengyi 6‍–‍3, compiling a highest break of 135. Bai lost 1‍–‍6 to Lisowski. After the match, she said: "I have gained a lot of experience of these occasions this week, it gives me more confidence. I can see some weaknesses in my game which I will work on." She stated that influencing girls to play snooker was one of her motivations to perform well. Lisowski commented: "Bai had an incredible run and that storyline was in the back of my head so I had to keep my concentration tonight." Wu defeated Lilley 6‍–‍3, while Ryan Day overcame Sanderson Lam 6‍–‍2. Hawkins beat Wang Yuchen 6‍–‍3, making a highest break of 111. Hawkins commented afterwards: "It's tough coming here to qualify but it feels great when you get through."

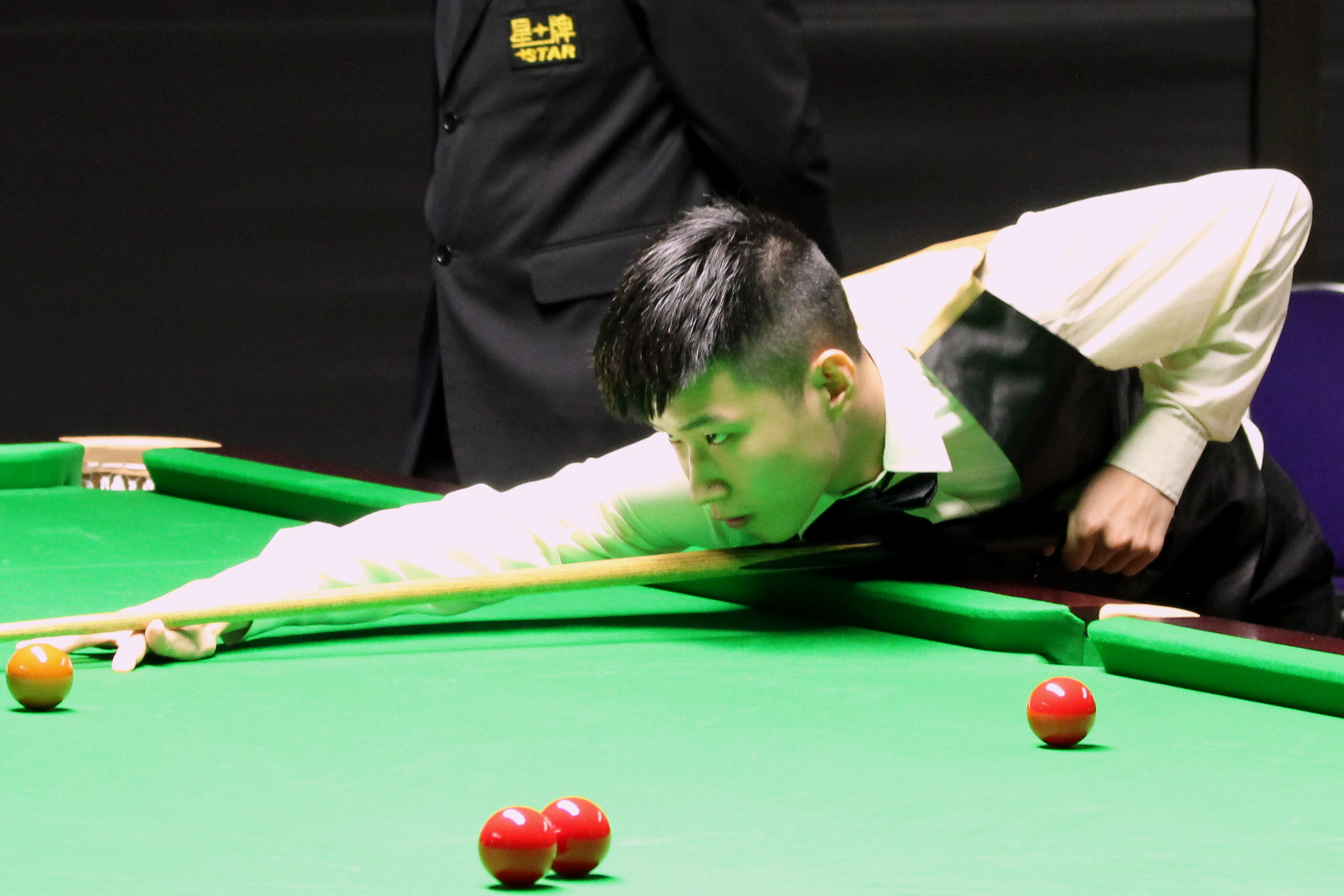
Playing in his first professional event after serving a 20‑month ban, 2021 winner Zhao Xintong (pictured in 2016) qualified for the main stage.

Zhao reached the main stage with a 6‍–‍2 victory over Ricky Walden. After the match, Zhao commented on his return to the sport, saying: "I have really missed this.... I love snooker and I needed to come back." David Gilbert beat Leclercq 6‍–‍1, commenting afterwards: "I played terrible but kept nicking frames.... Hopefully York will rekindle something for me." Matthew Selt defeated Zhou 6‍–‍3, saying after the match: "I got a bit nervous towards the end so I'm delighted to get through." Lei Peifan defeated Ben Woollaston 6‍–‍2. Neil Robertson defeated Stevens 6‍–‍2, making breaks of 136 and 125. He commented: "The game has changed a lot in the last couple of years. It's less about thundering in long balls and scoring heavily, it's more about denying your opponent scoring opportunities." Stan Moody trailed He 1‍–‍4 but tied the scores at 4‍–‍4. However, He won the match in a deciding frame. Robert Milkins beat Xu Si 6‍–‍2, saying afterwards: "It has been a shocker of a season for me so far... If I can get to a quarter or semi‑final I'll be happy." Michael Holt, who had recently regained his tour card, defeated Liu Hongyu 6‍–‍2. He commented: "I have battled all week, been a bit lucky at times but got there in the end."

=== Main stage ===
==== First round ====
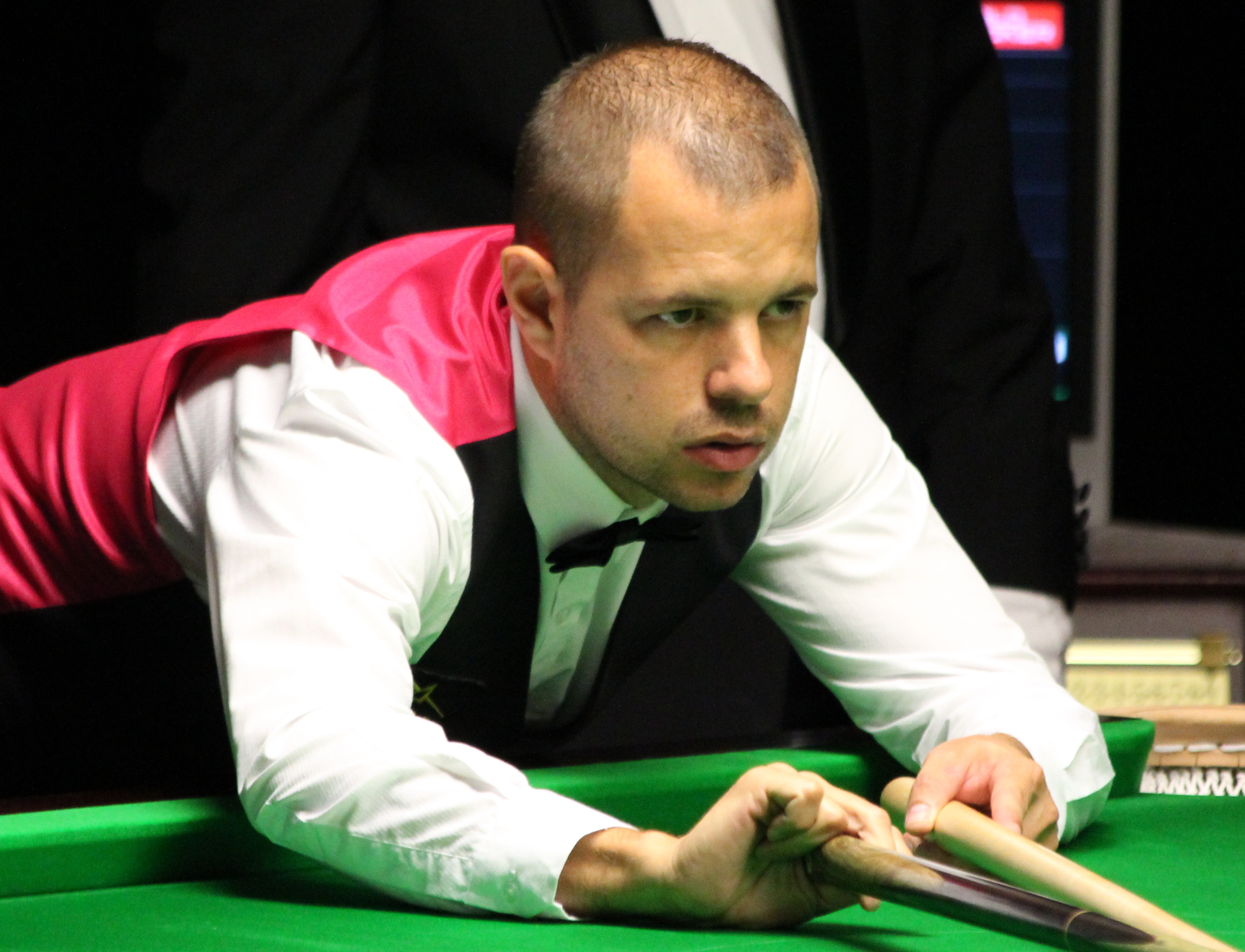
Barry Hawkins (pictured in 2012) defeated defending champion Ronnie O'Sullivan 6‍–‍4.

The first round of the event, featuring the 16 successful qualifiers against the 16 seeded players, took place from 23 to 26 November. Facing qualifier Barry Hawkins in the opening match, the defending champion Ronnie O'Sullivan made breaks of 128 and 114 as he took a 3‍–‍1 lead; he went on to lead 4‍–‍2. However, Hawkins then won four consecutive frames, including a run of 320 points without reply, as he secured a 6‍–‍4 victory. It was Hawkins's third victory over O'Sullivan in their 21 meetings and his first at a ranking event in eight years. Hawkins commented: "Maybe I was a bit more aggressive today, I had a bit more confidence and belief." The ninth seed Shaun Murphy won the first three frames against qualifier Zhao Xintong, but Zhao recovered to tie the scores at 3‍–‍3. Murphy, who had recently started working with retired professional Peter Ebdon as a coach and mentor, eventually won the match in a deciding frame. He commented afterward that "[Zhao] was in the top 16 at the time of his suspension. He really put me under it." Murphy welcomed Zhao back to the sport, saying: "We've all made mistakes, he has served his time, he should be allowed the opportunity to [...] get back on the tour." Ding Junhui, the eighth seed and three‑time champion, faced qualifier Robert Milkins. Milkins took a 5‍–‍3 lead, making a 130 break in the seventh frame. However, Ding made breaks of 57, 135, and 63 to win the match 6‍–‍5, commenting afterwards: "Winning is all that matters. Whether you are struggling or playing very good, you just have to win." Playing with a new cue, qualifier David Gilbert made six half‑century breaks as he defeated the 16th seed Xiao Guodong 6‍–‍4, commenting afterward: "It wasn't great. It was patchy, but I felt good in areas." In losing the match, Xiao fell out of the top 16 in the world rankings and failed to qualify for the 2025 Masters.

The 2022 champion and fourth seed Mark Allen faced qualifier Jackson Page. The scores were tied at 3‍–‍3 after the first six frames. Allen won frame seven after receiving 40 points in fouls and also won frame eight to move one from victory at 5‍–‍3. Page cleared the colours to win frame nine on the last black and then had opportunities in the tenth to force a deciding frame. However, Allen won the frame on the last black to complete a 6‍–‍4 victory. Allen expressed frustration afterwards with his form, calling his performance "awful" and saying: "I'm not in a good place with my game. I'm just struggling with my snooker... Nothing is coming easy to me at the moment." The 12th seed Ali Carter defeated qualifier Ryan Day by the same score to reach the last 16 of the tournament for the first time since the 2012 event, at which he had been a semi‑finalist. Carter said: "A good run would do everything for my confidence. Wins have been hard to come by and I had to work for that." Mark Selby, a two‑time winner and the fifth seed, played qualifier Jack Lisowski. Selby made breaks of 119, 59, and 136 as he established a 3‍–‍0 lead; in the first three frames, Selby scored 329 points, while Lisowski scored only six points by potting a red and blue. However, Lisowski won six of the last seven frames, making breaks of 55, 63, 100, 70, and 61, to clinch the match 6‍–‍4 and secure his first win over Selby in four years. Lisowski said afterwards: "[Selby] looked like a million dollars. I stuck in there and I feel good. I played solid tonight. I'm not known for my solid snooker but that was good." Qualifier Wu Yize took a 5‍–‍2 lead over 13th seed Si Jiahui. Although Si won the next two frames, Wu made a 52 break in the tenth frame to secure a 6‍–‍4 win.

Kyren Wilson, the reigning World Champion, whitewashed qualifier Stephen Maguire. Both players struggled in the match: Wilson made two half‑century breaks, while Maguire had a highest break of 32 and a pot success rate of 57 percent. Of his 6‍–‍0 victory, Wilson said: "It was surprising. I went into the match expecting a tough battle. [Maguire] is a real battler and for whatever reason it wasn't happening." Maguire, who had won the title 20 years previously at the 2004 event, called the performance one of his worst ever, saying it had been "garbage". He commented: "I still despise getting beaten, but I also despise playing like that. There's getting beaten and there's not showing up." The 15th seed Chris Wakelin trailed qualifier Matthew Selt 1‍–‍3 at the mid‑session interval but won five of the last six frames to secure a 6‍–‍4 victory and reach the last 16 of the tournament for the first time. Calling the match "a tough one, really tough", Wakelin said: "[Selt] didn't have much left towards the end so I knew if I could hold myself together I could get over the line." Qualifier Michael Holt defeated the tenth seed Gary Wilson 6‍–‍1 to reach the last 16 of the tournament for the first time since the 1999 event, at which he had been a quarter‑finalist. In the sixth frame, a stalemate situation arose while Holt was leading 44‍–‍9, but Holt took the frame with a 95 break after a re-rack. "This time last year I was getting ready to go to Q Tour 5 in Brighton, which I won, and now a year later I'm in the last 16 of the UK Championship so that's something I'm really pleased with," Holt said afterwards. Qualifier Jak Jones faced the seventh seed Luca Brecel. Brecel took a 5‍–‍3 lead, but Jones won the next two to force a deciding frame. Brecel had the first scoring opportunity in the decider but made a break of just 42, and Jones won the frame and match with a break of 66. Jones said afterwards: "You always want to do well in the biggest tournaments and this is the second‑biggest tournament on the tour and I felt good towards the end."

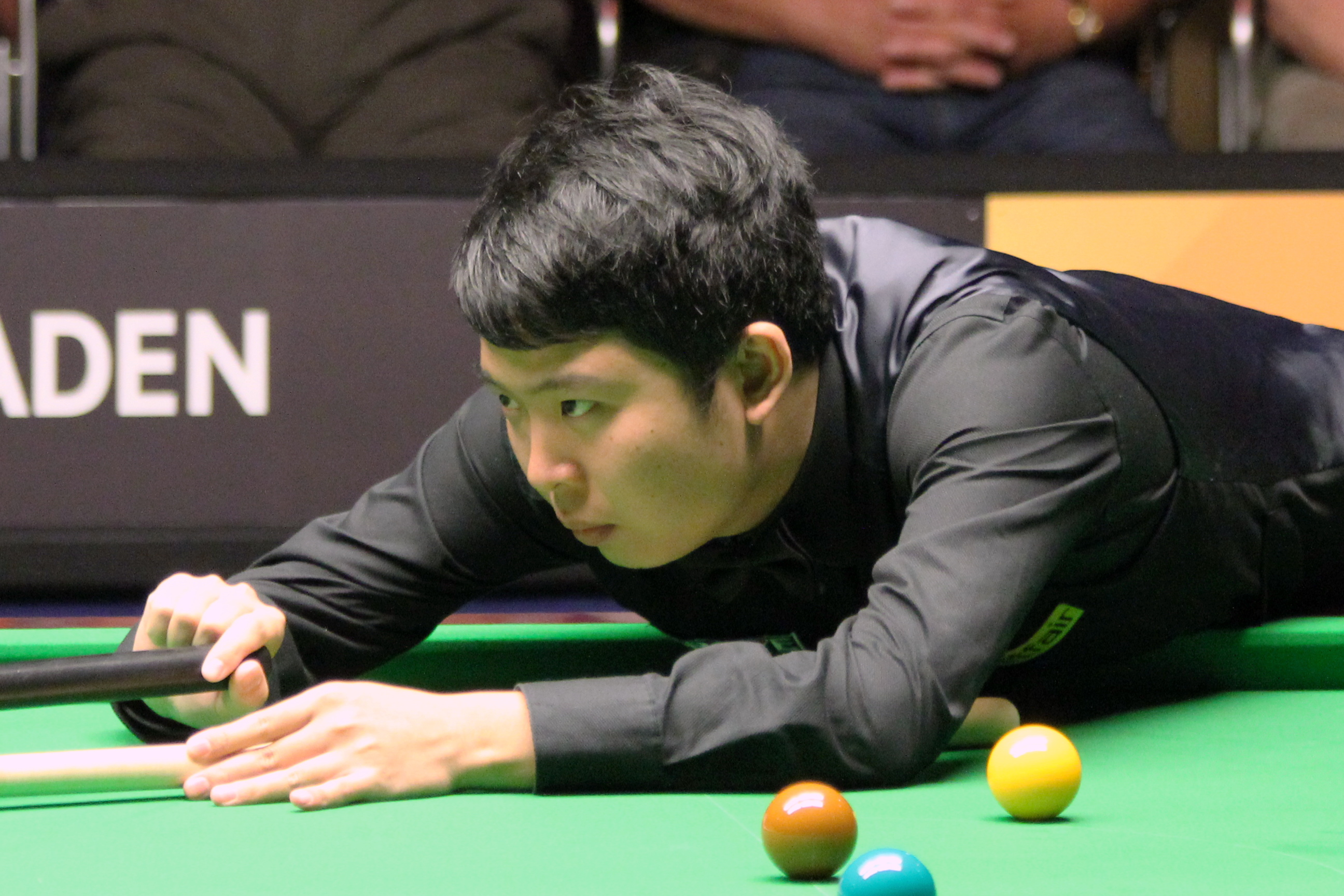
Zhang Anda (pictured in 2012) made the third maximum break of his career in the opening round.

The 2011 champion and third seed Judd Trump faced qualifier Neil Robertson, a three‑time winner of the event. Robertson led 3‍–‍1 at the mid‑session interval, but Trump then won five consecutive frames, making a 126 break in frame seven, to secure a 6‍–‍3 victory. "It was a difficult game at the start, but I managed to turn it around and play some good stuff at the end," Trump said afterwards. John Higgins, a three‑time winner and the 14th seed, made breaks including 110, 92, 72, and 64 as he whitewashed qualifier He Guoqiang in a match that lasted only an hour and fifty minutes. Higgins said afterwards: "I loved it out there. Coming down the stairs was absolutely fantastic. It is back to being like what the UK Championship was when I first turned professional." Despite losing the first two frames against qualifier Lei Peifan, the 11th seed Zhang Anda won six of the last seven to secure a 6‍–‍3 victory. In the fourth frame, Zhang made a maximum break, his third in professional competition and the 21st in the tournament's history. "I opened the reds so well and then I knew I could make it. It was just very exciting, my heart was beating so quickly," he said afterwards. Mark Williams, the sixth seed and a two‑time winner, faced qualifier Stuart Bingham. Williams led 4‍–‍1 and 5‍–‍2, but Bingham then won four consecutive frames, making breaks including 57, 79, and 82, as he secured a 6‍–‍5 victory. Bingham said afterwards: "I could see him struggling and I thought I needed to get my head together. I know I've been playing well. It was nice to win a match from 5‍–‍2 down against someone like Mark [Williams]." In all, seven of the sixteen seeded players—Brecel, O'Sullivan, Selby, Si, Williams, Gary Wilson, and Xiao—were eliminated in the first round.

==== Second round ====
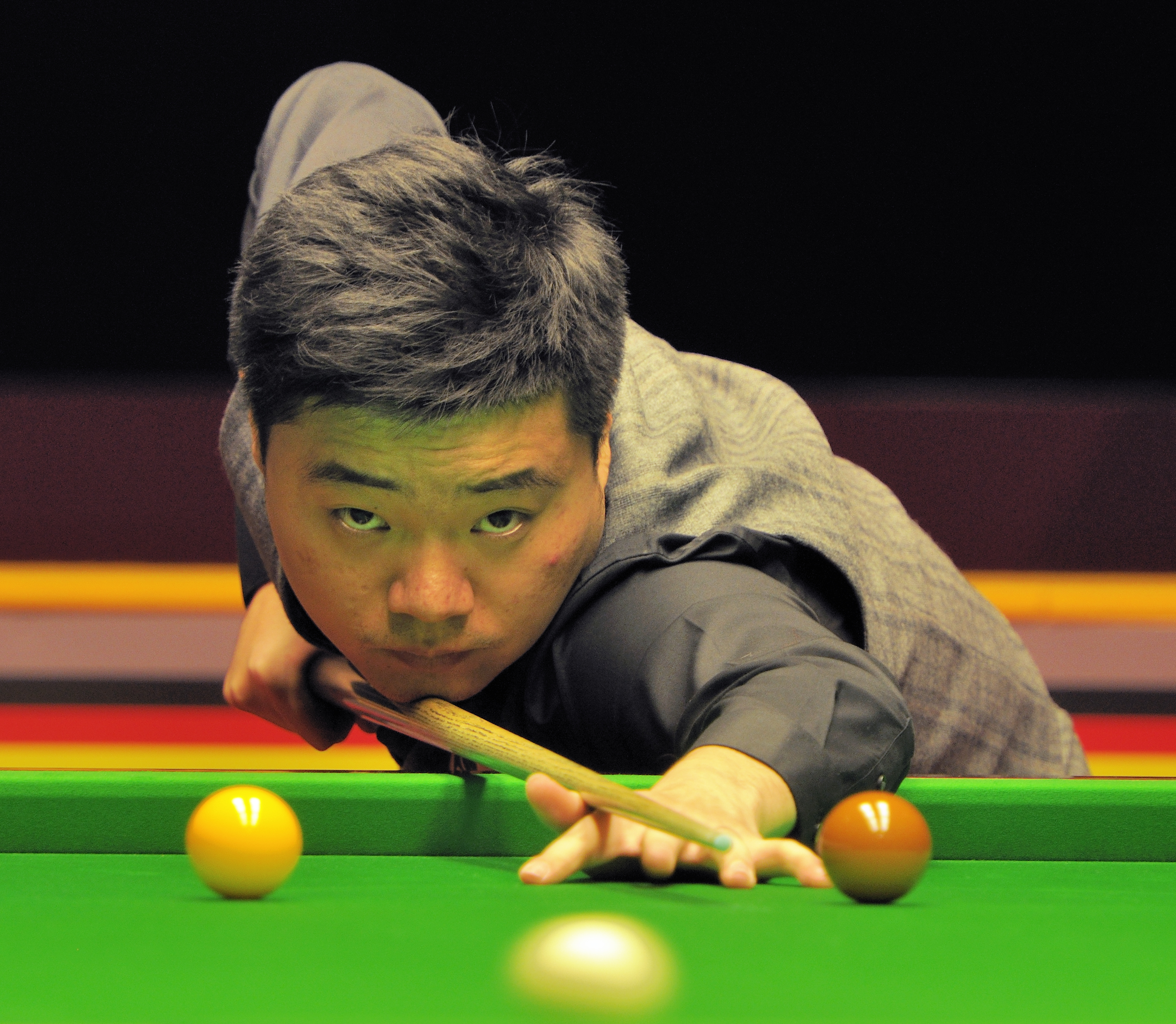
Three‑time champion Ding Junhui (pictured in 2014) lost 5‍–‍6 to Shaun Murphy in the second round.

The second round of the event, featuring seven qualifiers and nine seeded players, took place on 27 and 28 November. The eighth seed Ding faced the ninth seed Murphy. Ding made a 129 break in the opening frame, but both players missed pots in the early frames, and Murphy struggled with his rest play. Ding led 3‍–‍2 after the first five frames, but Murphy won the next three frames, making a 135 break in the eighth—his first break over 50 in the match—to secure a 5‍–‍3 advantage. Ding responded by making centuries of 107 and 126 to tie the scores at 5‍–‍5 and force a deciding frame. Murphy attempted a maximum break in the decider, which ended on 65 after nine reds and eight blacks, and went on to win the frame and match. "When you miss balls that I missed and make those mistakes you don't actually deserve to win," Murphy said afterwards, but added: "It was like a survival instinct kicked in at five‑all." In a match between two qualifiers, Hawkins faced Gilbert. Hawkins made a 144 break in the opening frame, but Gilbert compiled breaks of 100, 88, and 102 as he moved into a 5‍–‍4 lead. Gilbert looked likely to win the match in frame ten, but missed a shot with the rest on the last green ball, and Hawkins took the frame to force a decider. Hawkins then won the deciding frame after Gilbert missed a red to the middle pocket. "I thought I was going home. It was all over. He pots the green and it is a natural angle to come round for the brown. I was thinking whether I was driving home tonight or staying here to go to the pub!" said Hawkins afterwards about Gilbert's missed green. Hawkins's second‑round victory meant that Neil Robertson did not qualify automatically for the 2025 Masters, although he was subsequently invited to the tournament following O'Sullivan's withdrawal.

Lisowski won the opening frame against 12th seed Carter, but Carter won the second on the last black, following a safety battle on the pink. Lisowski then made breaks of 85, 63, and 106 as he won three consecutive frames for a 4‍–‍1 lead. Carter won the sixth frame with a 68 break, but Lisowski made a 97 break to take the seventh, moving one from victory at 5‍–‍2. Carter won the next two frames, reducing his deficit to one, but Lisowski secured a 6‍–‍4 victory with a 55 break in the tenth. After reaching the quarter‑final stage of the tournament for the fourth time in his career, Lisowksi said: "I didn't play as well as the other day but I was kind of expecting that. I felt a bit inexperienced at the end. I just push the boat out at the wrong times and he could have been coming back at me. It could definitely have been 5‍–‍5, so I got away with that." Facing qualifier Wu, Allen made half‑centuries in the opening two frames as he took a 2‍–‍0 lead. Wu won four consecutive frames with breaks including 77, 117, and 79 as he moved into a 4‍–‍2 lead, but Allen also won four frames in a row, making breaks of 110, 73, 100, and 80, to secure a 6‍–‍4 victory. Speaking of his upcoming quarter‑final against Lisowski, Allen said: "That was good there from me tonight. If I play like that, I give myself a good chance of beating [Lisowski]. He's riding the crest of a wave at the minute. It is up to me to go out there and stop him."

The third seed Trump played the 14th seed Higgins, who had not advanced beyond the last 16 of the tournament since the 2019 event. The scores were tied at 2‍–‍2 at the mid‑session interval, Higgins having won frame four on the last black. Trump won the fifth with a 111 break, but Higgins made breaks of 58 and 106 to go 4‍–‍3 ahead. Trump made breaks of 69 and 75 in the next two frames as he moved one from victory at 5‍–‍4, but Higgins forced a decider with a 66 break in the tenth. Higgins led 34‍–‍0 in the decider, but a potential stalemate situation arose, with the white in the middle of the pack of reds. A safety error from Higgins eventually left Trump a pot on a red, and Trump went on to win the frame and match with a 106 break. Trump's win meant that he had beaten Higgins in 12 of their last 13 meetings. "When the real pressure is on is probably when I produce my best stuff. The game was too slow and I wanted to speed it up and start taking more balls on," Trump commented afterwards. Facing the 11th seed Zhang, Bingham made a 101 break in the opening frame and led 3‍–‍1 at the mid‑session interval. A maximum break attempt by Bingham in the fifth frame ended on 105 after he missed the 14th black. Bingham also took frame six to move one from victory at 5‍–‍1. However, Zhang then won five consecutive frames, with breaks including 81, 70, and 108, to clinch a 6‍–‍5 victory. Zhang said afterwards: "It was a very tough game. [Bingham] is a difficult opponent. I didn't do anything wrong to be 5‍–‍1 down. [After the mid‑session interval] I didn't have too much pressure. I didn't think too far ahead and tried to win."

Kyren Wilson, the second seed, faced Wakelin, the 15th seed. Wilson led 3–1 at the mid-session interval, having made breaks of 85 and 108 and won the fourth frame after Wakelin missed the last black off its spot. Wilson maintained his two‑frame advantage at 4‍–‍2 and then recovered from 52 points behind to win the seventh frame. He also took frame eight to win the match 6‍–‍2. "I've felt really anxious this week. I don't know what it is. I don't know if it is that these big Triple Crown events have that much more feel to them. I'm quite aware that this is my time in the game and I want to make the most of it," Wilson commented afterwards. In a match between two qualifiers, Jones played Holt. The players were tied at 2‍–‍2 at the mid‑session interval, Holt having made a 101 century in the third frame. Jones then won three consecutive frames to lead 5‍–‍2, but Holt made breaks including 86, 68, and 86 as he won four consecutive frames for a 6‍–‍5 victory, reaching the quarter‑finals of the tournament for the first time since 1999. Holt said afterwards: "I'm lucky to win, but I take those chances when I'm practising. I just kept punching and kept swinging. Luckily I got over the line." Jones's defeat meant that he failed to qualify for the 2025 Masters.

==== Quarter-finals ====
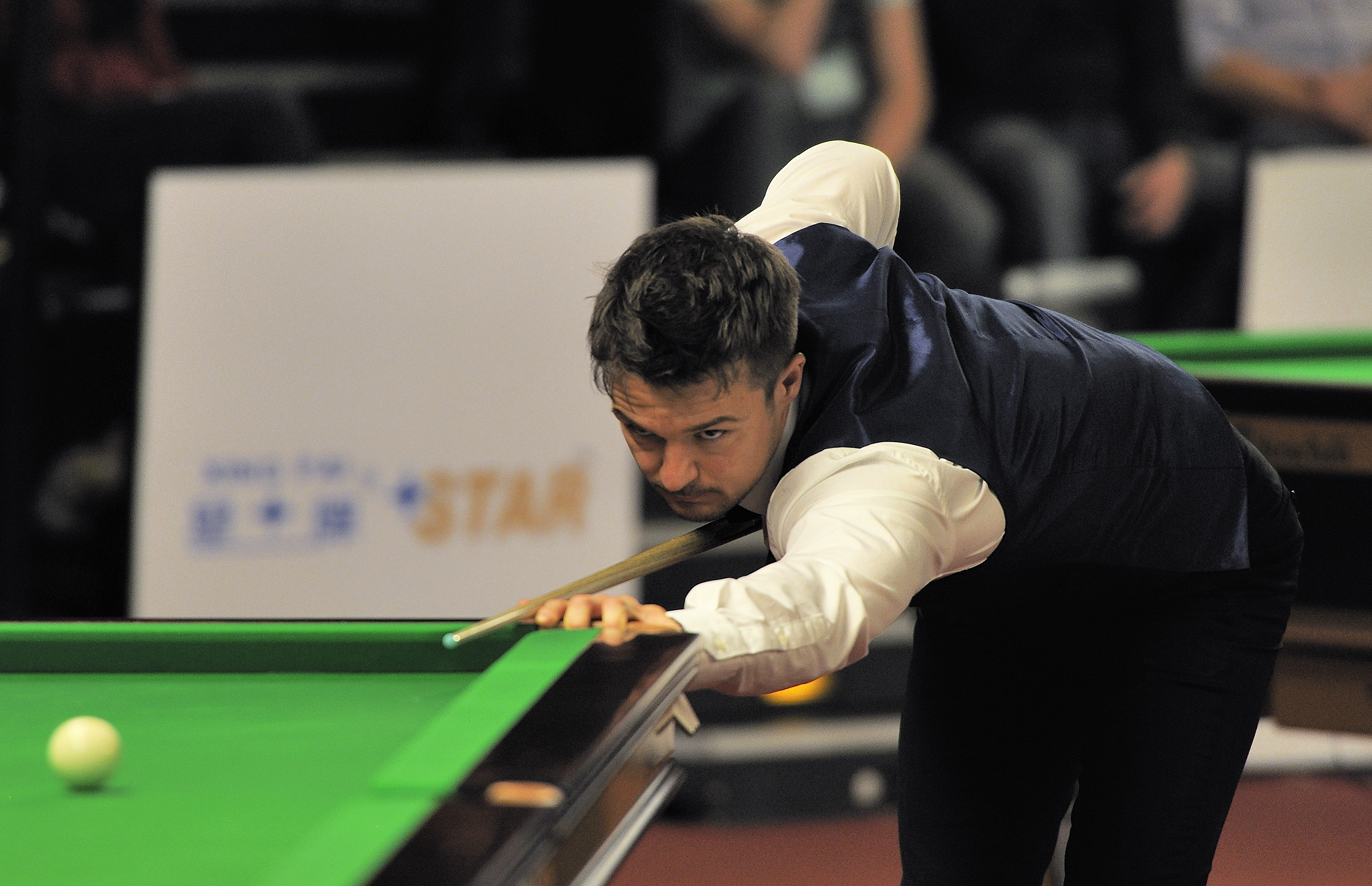
Qualifier Michael Holt (pictured in 2014) won six matches to reach the quarter‑finals of the tournament for the first time since the 1999 event.

The quarter‑finals were played on 29 November. Five seeded players—Allen, Murphy, Trump, Wilson, and Zhang—and three qualifiers—Hawkins, Holt, and Lisowski—reached the quarter‑final stage. Facing Zhang, Trump made an 89 break to win the opening frame and then made three consecutive centuries of 126, 120, and 131 as he took a 4‍–‍0 lead at the mid‑session interval. When the match resumed, Trump reached 527 points without reply—just 29 points short of the all‑time record of 556 set by O'Sullivan against Ricky Walden at the 2014 Masters—but he missed a pot while on a break of 61, after which Zhang potted his first ball of the match. Trump won the fifth frame. Although Zhang won frame six and made a 100 century to take the seventh, Trump secured a 6‍–‍2 victory with a 120 break in the eighth, his fourth century of the match. He reached the semi‑finals of the tournament for the fifth time. "I was more relaxed. As soon as the first frame goes like that I won't turn anything down. I'm always disappointed to miss a ball," Trump said afterwards. Playing Murphy, Hawkins won the first two frames. Murphy made breaks of 108 and 92 to draw level at 2‍–‍2 at the mid‑session interval, but Hawkins then won four consecutive frames for a 6‍–‍2 victory, recording 162 points without reply to win the last two. Hawkins, who made breaks of 63, 69, 91, 80, and 82 during the match, reached the semi‑finals of the event for a second time. "It is probably the best I have felt for a very long time. When the curtain went up I felt that if I got a chance I would take it," he said afterwards.

Playing qualifier Holt, Wilson led 3‍–‍1 at the mid‑session interval. Holt made a 50 break in the fifth, but Wilson responded with a 72 to win the frame. Holt won the next two, but Wilson won frame eight with a 67 break to lead 5‍–‍3. In the ninth frame, Wilson missed the 12th black off the spot while attempting a maximum break, although his 89 break secured the frame and a 6‍–‍3 victory. He reached the UK Championship semi‑finals for a second time. Speaking of his upcoming match against world number one Trump, Wilson said: "I think Judd [Trump] is one of those players that wants to prove he is the best in the world. I've got the better of him recently but that will just make him even more hungry to prove a point. He isn't world number one by fluke. He's been by far the most consistent player of the last few years, but I'm trying to hang onto his coattails." Lisowski made breaks of 114 and 88 as he won three of the first four frames against Allen, but Allen then made breaks of 103, 55, 69 and 51 as he won five consecutive frames for a 6‍–‍3 victory. Lisowski punched the table out of frustration late in the match. Of his upcoming match against Hawkins, Allen said: "Barry [Hawkins] has beaten me already this season. He is a very good player. He is very consistent on the big stage. I will have to go out there and play like I did against Wu Yize in the last round to stand any chance."

==== Semi-finals ====
The semi‑finals were played on 30 November. The top two players in the world rankings, Trump and Wilson, met in the afternoon session. Wilson won the first two frames, but Trump then won six consecutive frames, making two century breaks, as he secured a 6‍–‍2 victory. "I was able to pot the long ones after the interval. I was getting in from his break‑off and getting a good lead or winning the frame. He didn't do that much wrong. Overall I am very happy to win," Trump said afterwards. Wilson criticised the playing conditions, saying: "The tables have been really poor all week. Every time I have played they have been drifting to the right and even today, with just one table to focus on, it was the same scenario." Trump also recalled a shot on the black that had rolled off and missed the pocket. In the evening session, the world number 20 Hawkins defeated the world number three Allen 6‍–‍5. Allen led 4‍–‍2, but Hawkins tied the scores at 4‍–‍4 with breaks of 57 and 84. Allen won the ninth frame, but Hawkins made a break of 114 to force a decider, which he won. The match lasted five hours and six minutes, ending at 00:57 GMT the following morning. "It was an absolutely gruelling match", Hawkins said afterwards. "To come through one of those games, I'm over the moon. It wasn't pretty to watch. I had one good frame to level at 5‍–‍5. I can't remember many other frames that were any good. It was just a battle. I'm completely drained."

==== Final ====
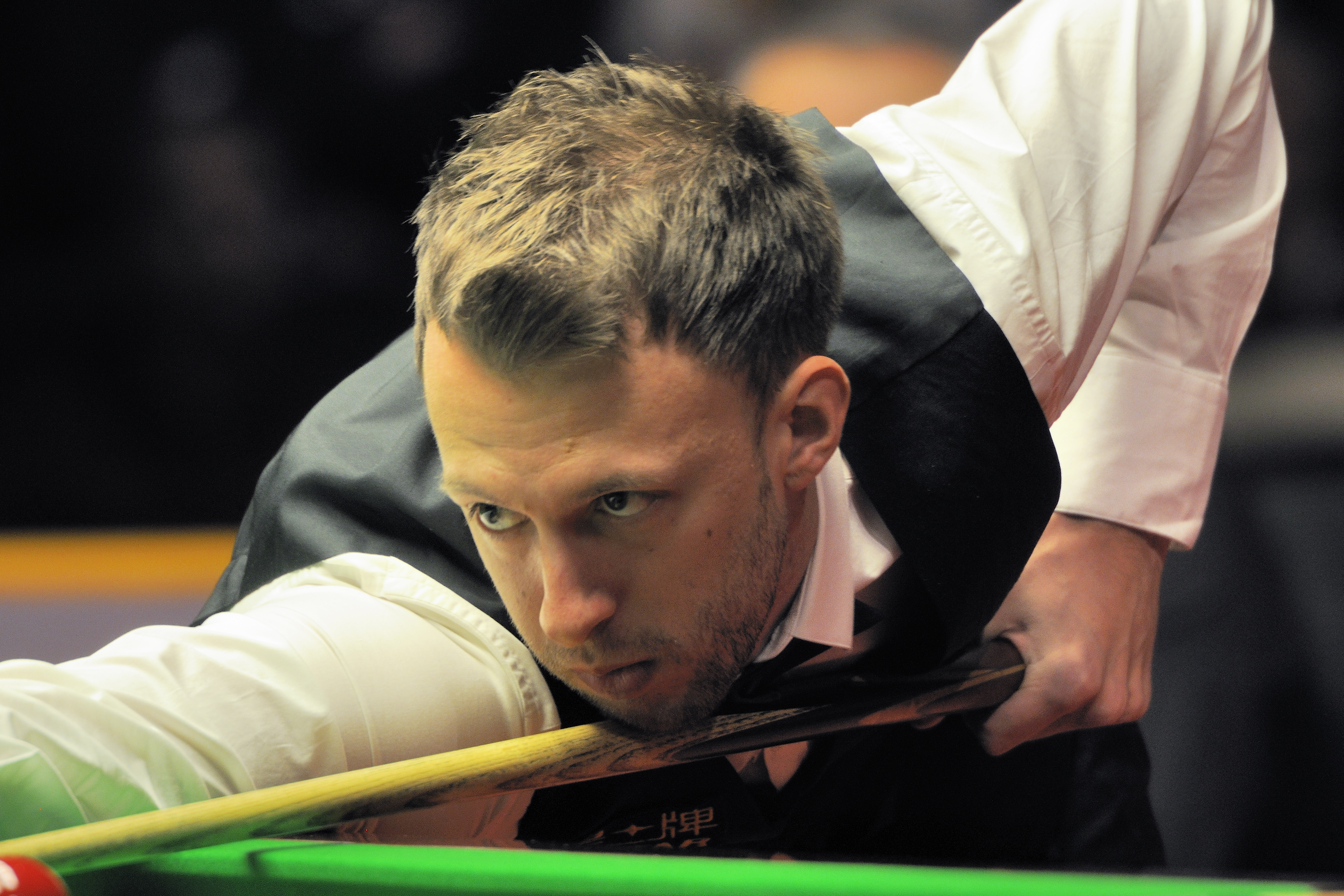
The world number one Judd Trump (pictured in 2014) won the tournament for a second time, capturing his 30th ranking title and fifth Triple Crown title.

The final took place on 1 December as the best of 19 frames, played over two sessions, between Trump and Hawkins. It was officiated by Tatiana Woollaston. Trump contested his fourth UK Championship final, having previously won the tournament in 2011 and been runner‑up in 2014 and 2020. Competing in his first UK Championship final, Hawkins was seeking a maiden Triple Crown title, having previously lost two Masters finals and a World Championship final. Trump won the opening frame with a 73 break, but Hawkins made a 116 break to win the second. Trump won the third and made a 69 break to lead in the fourth, but Hawkins made a clearance of 70 to win the frame by one point and tie the scores at 2‍–‍2. Trump won three frames in a row after the mid‑session interval, but Hawkins won the last of the session with an 81 break. Trump led 5‍–‍3 after the afternoon session.

In the evening session, Trump led 7‍–‍5 at the mid‑session interval. Hawkins took the 13th frame and looked likely to tie the scores in the 14th, but Trump won the frame after Hawkins lost position. In the 15th frame, Trump made a 133 break, his highest of the tournament, as he moved one from victory at 9‍–‍6. However, Hawkins made breaks of 75 and 82 in the next two frames, reducing Trump's lead to 9‍–‍8. Trailing in the 18th frame, Hawkins required two snookers on the colours. He secured four foul points from one snooker but was unable to obtain a second, and Trump eventually potted the brown, blue, and pink for a 10‍–‍8 victory. It was Trump's second UK Championship title, 30th ranking title, and fifth Triple Crown title. He became the tenth player to win the tournament multiple times. Having already won the season's 2024 Shanghai Masters and 2024 Saudi Arabia Snooker Masters and been runner‑up at the 2024 Xi'an Grand Prix and the 2024 Northern Ireland Open, he also became the first player to win more than £1 million in prize money in a season before Christmas. He said afterwards: "This is such a hard tournament to win and my record hasn't been amazing here. It has been a long time since I've been in the deep end here in York. I was struggling early on against Neil [Robertson] in the first round, managed to get through and then turned it on. I'm very proud and hold this trophy in very high esteem." Hawkins, who re‑entered the top 16 in the world rankings after the event, said: "It has been a great week. If someone had said I would get to the final beforehand, I would have taken it. Once I was here in the final I wanted to win. I thought it was a great game... [Trump] is just such a fantastic player and his all‑round game is phenomenal. It is no disgrace losing 10‍–‍8 to that man."

== Main draw ==
The draw for the tournament is shown below. Numbers in parentheses after the players' names denote the top 16 seeded players, an "a" indicates amateur players who are not on the main World Snooker Tour, and players in bold denote match winners.

**Last 32**; Best of 11 frames
Ronnie O'Sullivan (ENG) (1)	4
**Barry Hawkins (ENG)**	**6**
Xiao Guodong (CHN) (16)	4
**David Gilbert (ENG)**	**6**
**Shaun Murphy (ENG) (9)**	**6**
Zhao Xintong (CHN) (a)	5
**Ding Junhui (CHN) (8)**	**6**
Robert Milkins (ENG)	5
Mark Selby (ENG) (5)	4
**Jack Lisowski (ENG)**	**6**
**Ali Carter (ENG) (12)**	**6**
Ryan Day (WAL)	4
Si Jiahui (CHN) (13)	4
**Wu Yize (CHN)**	**6**
**Mark Allen (NIR) (4)**	**6**
Jackson Page (WAL)	4
**Judd Trump (ENG) (3)**	**6**
Neil Robertson (AUS)	3
**John Higgins (SCO) (14)**	**6**
He Guoqiang (CHN)	0
**Zhang Anda (CHN) (11)**	**6**
Lei Peifan (CHN)	3
Mark Williams (WAL) (6)	5
**Stuart Bingham (ENG)**	**6**
Luca Brecel (BEL) (7)	5
**Jak Jones (WAL)**	**6**
Gary Wilson (ENG) (10)	1
**Michael Holt (ENG)**	**6**
**Chris Wakelin (ENG) (15)**	**6**
Matthew Selt (ENG)	4
**Kyren Wilson (ENG) (2)**	**6**
Stephen Maguire (SCO)	0

**Last 16**; Best of 11 frames
**(England) Barry Hawkins**	**6**
(England) David Gilbert	5
**(England) Shaun Murphy (9)**	**6**
(China) Ding Junhui (8)	5
**(England) Jack Lisowski**	**6**
(England) Ali Carter (12)	4
(China) Wu Yize	4
**(Northern Ireland) Mark Allen (4)**	**6**
**(England) Judd Trump (3)**	**6**
(Scotland) John Higgins (14)	5
**(China) Zhang Anda (11)**	**6**
(England) Stuart Bingham	5
(Wales) Jak Jones	5
**(England) Michael Holt**	**6**
(England) Chris Wakelin (15)	2
**(England) Kyren Wilson (2)**	**6**

**Quarter-finals**; Best of 11 frames
**(England) Barry Hawkins**	**6**
(England) Shaun Murphy (9)	2
(England) Jack Lisowski	3
**(Northern Ireland) Mark Allen (4)**	**6**
**(England) Judd Trump (3)**	**6**
(China) Zhang Anda (11)	2
(England) Michael Holt	3
**(England) Kyren Wilson (2)**	**6**

**Semi-finals**; Best of 11 frames
**(England) Barry Hawkins**	**6**
(Northern Ireland) Mark Allen (4)	5
**(England) Judd Trump (3)**	**6**
(England) Kyren Wilson (2)	2

**Final**; Best of 19 frames
(England) Barry Hawkins	8
**(England) Judd Trump (3)**	**10**

=== Final ===
Final: Best of 19 frames. Referee: Tatiana Woollaston; York Barbican, York, England, 1 December 2024
Barry Hawkins; England	8–**10**	**Judd Trump** (3); England
Afternoon: 0–**73**, **122**–6 (116), 0–**72**, **70**–69, 5–**66**, 1–**103** (102), 49–**66**, **81**–51; Evening: 0–**94**, **93**–0, **66**–12, 11–**96**, **83**–0, 35–**67**, 0–**133** (133), **75**–0, **86**–0, 43–**82**
(frame 2) 116	Highest break	**133** (frame 15)
1	Century breaks	**2**

== Qualifying draw ==
The results of the qualifying draw are shown below. Numbers in parentheses after the players' names denote the players' seeding, an "a" indicates amateur players who were not on the main World Snooker Tour, and players in bold denote match winners.

**Round 1 (Last 144)**; Best of 11 frames 16–17 November
**Gong Chenzhi (CHN) (81)**	**6**
Daniel Womersley (ENG) (a)	2
Jonas Luz (BRA) (112)	1
**Florian Nüßle (AUT) (a)**	**6**
**Liam Graham (SCO) (96)**	**6**
Baipat Siripaporn (THA) (119)	0
**Artemijs Žižins (LAT) (97)**	**6**
Mark Joyce (ENG) (a)	1
**Haris Tahir (PAK) (104)**	**6**
Craig Steadman (ENG) (a)	3
Ben Mertens (BEL) (89)	4
**Oliver Sykes (ENG) (a)**	**6**
**Mostafa Dorgham (EGY) (105)**	**6**
Huang Jiahao (CHN) (112)	4
**Liam Pullen (ENG) (88)**	**6**
Joshua Thomond (ENG) (a)	3
**Zak Surety (ENG) (85)**	**6**
Simon Blackwell (ENG) (a)	4
Farakh Ajaib (PAK) (108)	4
**Bai Yulu (CHN) (117)**	**6**
Dean Young (SCO) (92)	4
**Mohammed Shehab (UAE) (120)**	**6**
**Haydon Pinhey** (ENG) (101)	**w/o**
Reanne Evans (ENG) (113)	w/d
**Liam Davies (WAL) (100)**	**6**
Ahmed Aly Elsayed (USA) (118)	3
Bulcsú Révész (HUN) (93)	3
**Iulian Boiko (UKR) (a)**	**6**
**Wang Yuchen (HKG) (109)**	**6**
Lewis Ullah (ENG) (a)	2
**Alexander Ursenbacher (SUI) (84)**	**6**
Joshua Cooper (ENG) (a)	1
**Lei Peifan (CHN) (83)**	**6**
Vladislav Gradinari (MDA) (a)	0
Mink Nutcharut (THA) (110)	0
**Hatem Yassen (EGY) (121)**	**6**
**Amir Sarkhosh (IRN) (94)**	**6**
Anton Kazakov (UKR) (a)	1
**Cheung Ka Wai (HKG) (99)**	**6**
Harvey Chandler (ENG) (a)	1
**Antoni Kowalski (POL) (102)**	**6**
Igor Figueiredo (BRA) (a)	4
Sunny Akani (THA) (91)	3
**Zhao Xintong (CHN) (a)**	**6**
**Julien Leclercq** (BEL) (107)	**w/o**
Hamza Ilyas (PAK) (a)	w/d
Andrew Pagett (WAL) (86)	3
**Mitchell Mann (ENG) (115)**	**6**
**Jimmy White (ENG) (87)**	**6**
Paul Deaville (ENG) (a)	2
**Chris Totten (SCO) (106)**	**6**
Ryan Davies (ENG) (a)	2
**Duane Jones (WAL) (90)**	**6**
Ryan Thomerson (AUS) (a)	3
**Robbie McGuigan (NIR) (103)**	**6**
Habib Subah Humood (BHR) (a)	3
Allan Taylor (ENG) (98)	3
**Kreishh Gurbaxani (IND) (116)**	**6**
**Michael Holt (ENG) (95)**	**6**
Steven Hallworth (ENG) (a)	3
**Manasawin Phetmalaikul (THA) (111)**	**6**
Andres Petrov (EST) (a)	4
Andrew Higginson (ENG) (82)	2
**Dylan Emery (WAL) (a)**	**6**

**Round 2 (Last 112)**; Best of 11 frames 17–18 November
**Ian Burns (ENG) (80)**	**6**
Gong Chenzhi (CHN) (81)	0
Jordan Brown (NIR) (49)	2
**Florian Nüßle (AUT) (a)**	**6**
**Long Zehuang (CHN) (65)**	**6**
Liam Graham (SCO) (96)	3
David Grace (ENG) (64)	3
**Artemijs Žižins (LAT) (97)**	**6**
**Daniel Wells (WAL) (57)**	**6**
Haris Tahir (PAK) (104)	4
Stuart Carrington (ENG) (72)	3
**Oliver Sykes (ENG) (a)**	**6**
**Jamie Clarke (WAL) (56)**	**6**
Mostafa Dorgham (EGY) (105)	4
**Ma Hailong (CHN) (73)**	**6**
Liam Pullen (ENG) (88)	3
**Rory Thor (MAS) (76)**	**6**
Zak Surety (ENG) (85)	4
Jamie Jones (WAL) (53)	4
**Bai Yulu (CHN) (117)**	**6**
**Louis Heathcote (ENG) (69)**	**6**
Mohammed Shehab (UAE) (120)	0
**Sanderson Lam (ENG) (60)**	**6**
Haydon Pinhey (ENG) (101)	3
**David Lilley (ENG) (61)**	**6**
Liam Davies (WAL) (100)	2
**Ashley Carty (ENG) (68)**	**6**
Iulian Boiko (UKR) (a)	4
Mark Davis (ENG) (52)	5
**Wang Yuchen (HKG) (109)**	**6**
**Alfie Burden (ENG) (77)**	**6**
Alexander Ursenbacher (SUI) (84)	4
Hammad Miah (ENG) (78)	2
**Lei Peifan (CHN) (83)**	**6**
**Joe Perry (ENG) (51)**	**6**
Hatem Yassen (EGY) (121)	2
**Marco Fu (HKG) (67)**	**6**
Amir Sarkhosh (IRN) (94)	1
**Aaron Hill (IRL) (62)**	**6**
Cheung Ka Wai (HKG) (99)	5
Anthony Hamilton (ENG) (59)	3
**Antoni Kowalski (POL) (102)**	**6**
Jiang Jun (CHN) (70)	2
**Zhao Xintong (CHN) (a)**	**6**
Graeme Dott (SCO) (54)	4
**Julien Leclercq (BEL) (107)**	**6**
**Xing Zihao (CHN) (75)**	**6**
Mitchell Mann (ENG) (115)	4
**Ross Muir (SCO) (74)**	**6**
Jimmy White (ENG) (87)	4
Tian Pengfei (CHN) (55)	5
**Chris Totten (SCO) (106)**	**6**
**Stan Moody (ENG) (71)**	**6**
Duane Jones (WAL) (90)	3
**He Guoqiang (CHN) (58)**	**6**
Robbie McGuigan (NIR) (103)	1
**Liu Hongyu (CHN) (63)**	**6**
Kreishh Gurbaxani (IND) (116)	1
Ishpreet Singh Chadha (IND) (66)	5
**Michael Holt (ENG) (95)**	**6**
**Matthew Stevens (WAL) (50)**	**6**
Manasawin Phetmalaikul (THA) (111)	4
**Oliver Lines (ENG) (79)**	**6**
Dylan Emery (WAL) (a)	3

**Round 3 (Last 80)**; Best of 11 frames 18–19 November
**Jak Jones (WAL) (17)**	**6**
Ian Burns (ENG) (80)	2
**Fan Zhengyi (CHN) (48)**	**6**
Florian Nüßle (AUT) (a)	2
**Elliot Slessor (ENG) (32)**	**6**
Long Zehuang (CHN) (65)	3
**Stephen Maguire (SCO) (33)**	**6**
Artemijs Žižins (LAT) (97)	3
**Jimmy Robertson (ENG) (40)**	**6**
Daniel Wells (WAL) (57)	5
**Stuart Bingham (ENG) (25)**	**6**
Oliver Sykes (ENG) (a)	3
**Jackson Page (WAL) (41)**	**6**
Jamie Clarke (WAL) (56)	4
**Hossein Vafaei (IRN) (24)**	**6**
Ma Hailong (CHN) (73)	3
**Jack Lisowski (ENG) (21)**	**6**
Rory Thor (MAS) (76)	4
Scott Donaldson (SCO) (44)	5
**Bai Yulu (CHN) (117)**	**6**
**Ryan Day (WAL) (28)**	**6**
Louis Heathcote (ENG) (69)	3
Yuan Sijun (CHN) (37)	5
**Sanderson Lam (ENG) (60)**	**6**
Thepchaiya Un-Nooh (THA) (36)	3
**David Lilley (ENG) (61)**	**6**
**Wu Yize (CHN) (29)**	**6**
Ashley Carty (ENG) (68)	2
Robbie Williams (ENG) (45)	4
**Wang Yuchen (HKG) (109)**	**6**
**Barry Hawkins (ENG) (20)**	**6**
Alfie Burden (ENG) (77)	1
Tom Ford (ENG) (19)	5
**Lei Peifan (CHN) (83)**	**6**
**Ben Woollaston (ENG) (46)**	**6**
Joe Perry (ENG) (51)	5
**Zhou Yuelong (CHN) (30)**	**6**
Marco Fu (HKG) (67)	3
**Matthew Selt (ENG) (35)**	**6**
Aaron Hill (IRL) (62)	2
**Ricky Walden (ENG) (38)**	**6**
Antoni Kowalski (POL) (102)	2
Noppon Saengkham (THA) (27)	2
**Zhao Xintong (CHN) (a)**	**6**
Dominic Dale (WAL) (43)	2
**Julien Leclercq (BEL) (107)**	**6**
**David Gilbert (ENG) (22)**	**6**
Xing Zihao (CHN) (75)	5
**Robert Milkins (ENG) (23)**	**6**
Ross Muir (SCO) (74)	3
**Xu Si (CHN) (42)**	**6**
Chris Totten (SCO) (106)	5
Pang Junxu (CHN) (26)	2
**Stan Moody (ENG) (71)**	**6**
Anthony McGill (SCO) (39)	5
**He Guoqiang (CHN) (58)**	**6**
Lyu Haotian (CHN) (34)	3
**Liu Hongyu (CHN) (63)**	**6**
Joe O'Connor (ENG) (31)	3
**Michael Holt (ENG) (95)**	**6**
Martin O'Donnell (ENG) (47)	3
**Matthew Stevens (WAL) (50)**	**6**
**Neil Robertson (AUS) (18)**	**6**
Oliver Lines (ENG) (79)	5

**Round 4 (Last 48)**; Best of 11 frames 20–21 November
**Jak Jones (WAL) (17)**	**6**
Fan Zhengyi (CHN) (48)	3
Elliot Slessor (ENG) (32)	5
**Stephen Maguire (SCO) (33)**	**6**
Jimmy Robertson (ENG) (40)	0
**Stuart Bingham (ENG) (25)**	**6**
**Jackson Page (WAL) (41)**	**6**
Hossein Vafaei (IRN) (24)	2
**Jack Lisowski (ENG) (21)**	**6**
Bai Yulu (CHN) (117)	1
**Ryan Day (WAL) (28)**	**6**
Sanderson Lam (ENG) (60)	2
David Lilley (ENG) (61)	3
**Wu Yize (CHN) (29)**	**6**
Wang Yuchen (HKG) (109)	3
**Barry Hawkins (ENG) (20)**	**6**
**Lei Peifan (CHN) (83)**	**6**
Ben Woollaston (ENG) (46)	2
Zhou Yuelong (CHN) (30)	3
**Matthew Selt (ENG) (35)**	**6**
Ricky Walden (ENG) (38)	2
**Zhao Xintong (CHN) (a)**	**6**
Julien Leclercq (BEL) (107)	1
**David Gilbert (ENG) (22)**	**6**
**Robert Milkins (ENG) (23)**	**6**
Xu Si (CHN) (42)	2
Stan Moody (ENG) (71)	5
**He Guoqiang (CHN) (58)**	**6**
Liu Hongyu (CHN) (63)	2
**Michael Holt (ENG) (95)**	**6**
Matthew Stevens (WAL) (50)	2
**Neil Robertson (AUS) (18)**	**6**

Note: w/d=withdrawn; w/o=walkover

== Century breaks ==
=== Main stage centuries ===
A total of 45 century breaks were made during the main stage of the tournament in York.

- 147, 108, 100 – Zhang Anda
- 144, 116, 114 – Barry Hawkins
- 136, 119 – Mark Selby
- 135, 129, 126, 107 – Ding Junhui
- 135, 108 – Shaun Murphy
- 133, 131, 126, 126, 120, 120, 111, 106, 102, 100, 100 – Judd Trump
- 130 – Robert Milkins
- 128, 114 – Ronnie O'Sullivan
- 128 – Si Jiahui
- 117 – Wu Yize
- 114, 106, 100 – Jack Lisowski
- 110, 106 – John Higgins
- 110, 103, 100 – Mark Allen
- 108 – Kyren Wilson
- 107 – Neil Robertson
- 105, 101 – Stuart Bingham
- 102, 100 – David Gilbert
- 101 – Michael Holt

=== Qualifying stage centuries ===
A total of 83 century breaks were made during the qualifying stage of the tournament in Leicester.

- 146, 127, 124, 115 – Zhao Xintong
- 141, 134 – Zhou Yuelong
- 139, 110 – Liu Hongyu
- 138, 113 – Stan Moody
- 137, 130 – Wu Yize
- 136, 125, 102 – Neil Robertson
- 135, 101 – Jak Jones
- 135 – Yuan Sijun
- 135 – Artemijs Žižins
- 134, 119 – Stephen Maguire
- 134 – Liam Davies
- 134 – Bulcsú Révész
- 134 – Xing Zihao
- 133, 115, 104 – Fan Zhengyi
- 132, 106 – Aaron Hill
- 131, 129, 107 – Lei Peifan
- 130 – Michael Holt
- 129, 115, 111, 101 – David Lilley
- 129 – Stuart Bingham
- 125, 124 – Ricky Walden
- 125, 103 – Ross Muir
- 124 – Joe Perry
- 124 – Rory Thor
- 123, 111 – Anthony McGill
- 123, 106 – Gong Chenzhi
- 123 – Jack Lisowski
- 121, 105 – Wang Yuchen
- 120 – Chris Totten
- 117, 110 – Louis Heathcote
- 115, 102 – Alexander Ursenbacher
- 115 – Martin O'Donnell
- 115 – Xu Si
- 114, 103 – Sanderson Lam
- 112, 100 – Long Zehuang
- 112 – Cheung Ka Wai
- 111, 109 – Florian Nüßle
- 111 – Barry Hawkins
- 108, 100 – Marco Fu
- 107 – Jiang Jun
- 107 – Ben Woollaston
- 106, 102 – Julien Leclercq
- 105 – Elliot Slessor
- 103 – Joe O'Connor
- 103 – Daniel Womersley
- 102, 100 – He Guoqiang
- 102 – Ryan Day
- 102 – Mostafa Dorgham
- 101 – Mitchell Mann
- 100 – Oliver Lines
- 100 – Zak Surety
- 100 – Haris Tahir
