= 2025 Welsh Open (snooker) =

Snooker tournament

2025 BetVictor Welsh Open

Tournament information
- Dates: 10–16 February 2025
- Venue: Venue Cymru
- City: Llandudno
- Country: Wales
- Organisation: World Snooker Tour
- Format: Ranking event
- Total prize fund: £550,400
- Winner's share: £100,000
- Highest break: Xu Si (CHN) (147)

Final
- Champion: Mark Selby (ENG)
- Runner-up: Stephen Maguire (SCO)
- Score: 9–6

The 2025 Welsh Open (officially the 2025 BetVictor Welsh Open) was a professional snooker tournament that took place from 10 to 16 February 2025 at Venue Cymru in Llandudno, Wales. It was the 34th consecutive edition of the Welsh Open since it was first staged in 1992; the tournament was held at Venue Cymru in Llandudno for a third consecutive year. Qualifying rounds took place from 4 to 6 February 2025 at the Barnsley Metrodome in Barnsley, England. The 13th ranking event of the 2024‍–‍25 season, following the 2025 German Masters and preceding the 2025 World Open, it was the fourth and final tournament in the season's Home Nations Series, following the 2024 English Open, the 2024 Northern Ireland Open, and the 2024 Scottish Open. Organised by the World Snooker Tour and sponsored by BetVictor, the event was broadcast by BBC Wales, BBC iPlayer, and BBC Red Button domestically, by Discovery+ and Eurosport in Europe, and by other broadcasters worldwide. The winner received £100,000 from a total prize fund of £550,400, the Ray Reardon trophy, and a place in the 2025 Champion of Champions invitational event.

Gary Wilson was the defending champion, having defeated Martin O'Donnell 9‍–‍4 in the 2024 final, but he lost 3‍–‍4 to Ishpreet Singh Chadha in the first round. Mark Selby won the tournament, beating Stephen Maguire 9‍–‍6 in the final to claim his second Welsh Open title and 24th ranking title. Neil Robertson secured the £150,000 BetVictor Bonus for winning the most prize money across the season's four Home Nations Series events.

The tournament produced 72 century breaks, 26 in the qualifying rounds and 46 at the main stage, of which the highest was a maximum break by Xu Si in the second round of qualifying. It was Xu's third maximum break in professional competition.

== Format ==
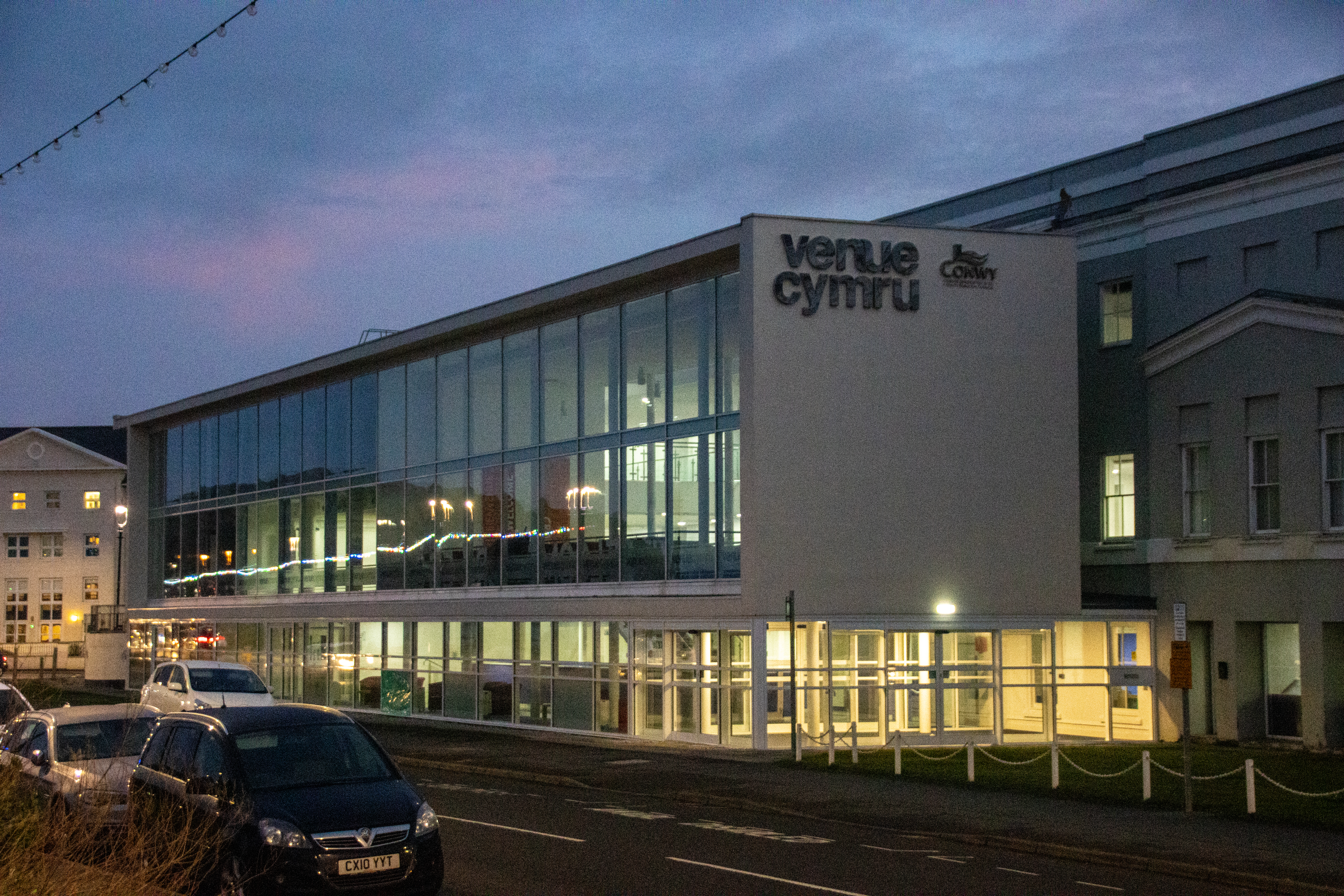
The tournament was staged at Venue Cymru in Llandudno, Wales.

The event was the 34th consecutive edition of the Welsh Open since it was first played in 1992, making it snooker's third longest running ranking tournament after the World Championship and UK Championship. The fourth and final event in the season's Home Nations Series (following the 2024 Scottish Open), and the 13th ranking tournament of the 2024‍–‍25 season (following the 2025 German Masters and preceding the 2025 World Open), it took place from 10 to 16 February 2025 at Venue Cymru in Llandudno, Wales.

Qualifying took place from 4 to 6 February 2025 at the Barnsley Metrodome in Barnsley, England. The WST implemented a new format for the four Home Nations events and the German Masters this season. In qualifying round one, players seeded 65‍–‍96 face those seeded 97‍–‍128. In qualifying round two, the 32 round one winners play those seeded 33‍–‍64. The 32 round two winners then play the top 32 seeds in the first round of the main stage.

All matches were played as the best of seven frames until the quarter‑finals, which were the best of nine. The semi‑finals were the best of 11, and the final was a best of 17 frames match played over two sessions. The defending champion was Gary Wilson, who defeated Martin O'Donnell 9‍–‍4 in the 2024 final in what was O'Donnell's first ranking final, but he lost 3‍–‍4 to Ishpreet Singh Chadha in the first round. World number one Judd Trump chose to withdraw from the tournament prior to the seeding, citing a focus on other events.

=== Broadcasters ===
The qualifying rounds were broadcast by Discovery+ in Europe (including the United Kingdom and Ireland) and by the CBSA‑WPBSA Academy WeChat Channel, the CBSA‑WPBSA Academy Douyin, Huya Live and Migu in China. They were available from WST Play in all other territories.

The main stage of the event was broadcast by BBC Wales, BBC iPlayer and BBC Red Button in the United Kingdom; Eurosport and Discovery+ in Europe (including the UK and Ireland); CCTV‑5, Huya Live, Migu, the CBSA‑WPBSA Academy WeChat Channel and the CBSA‑WPBSA Academy Douyin in mainland China; Now TV in Hong Kong; Astro SuperSport in Malaysia and Brunei; TrueVisions in Thailand; Sportcast in Taiwan; and TAP in the Philippines. It was available from WST Play in all other territories.

=== Prize fund ===
The tournament winner received the Ray Reardon trophy. The breakdown of prize money for the event, an increase of £123,400 from the previous event, is shown below:

- Winner: £100,000
- Runner-up: £45,000
- Semi-final: £21,000
- Quarter-final: £13,200
- Last 16: £9,000
- Last 32: £5,400
- Last 64: £3,600
- Last 96: £1,000
- Highest break: £5,000
- Total: £550,400

== Summary ==
=== Qualifying rounds ===
==== Round 1 ====
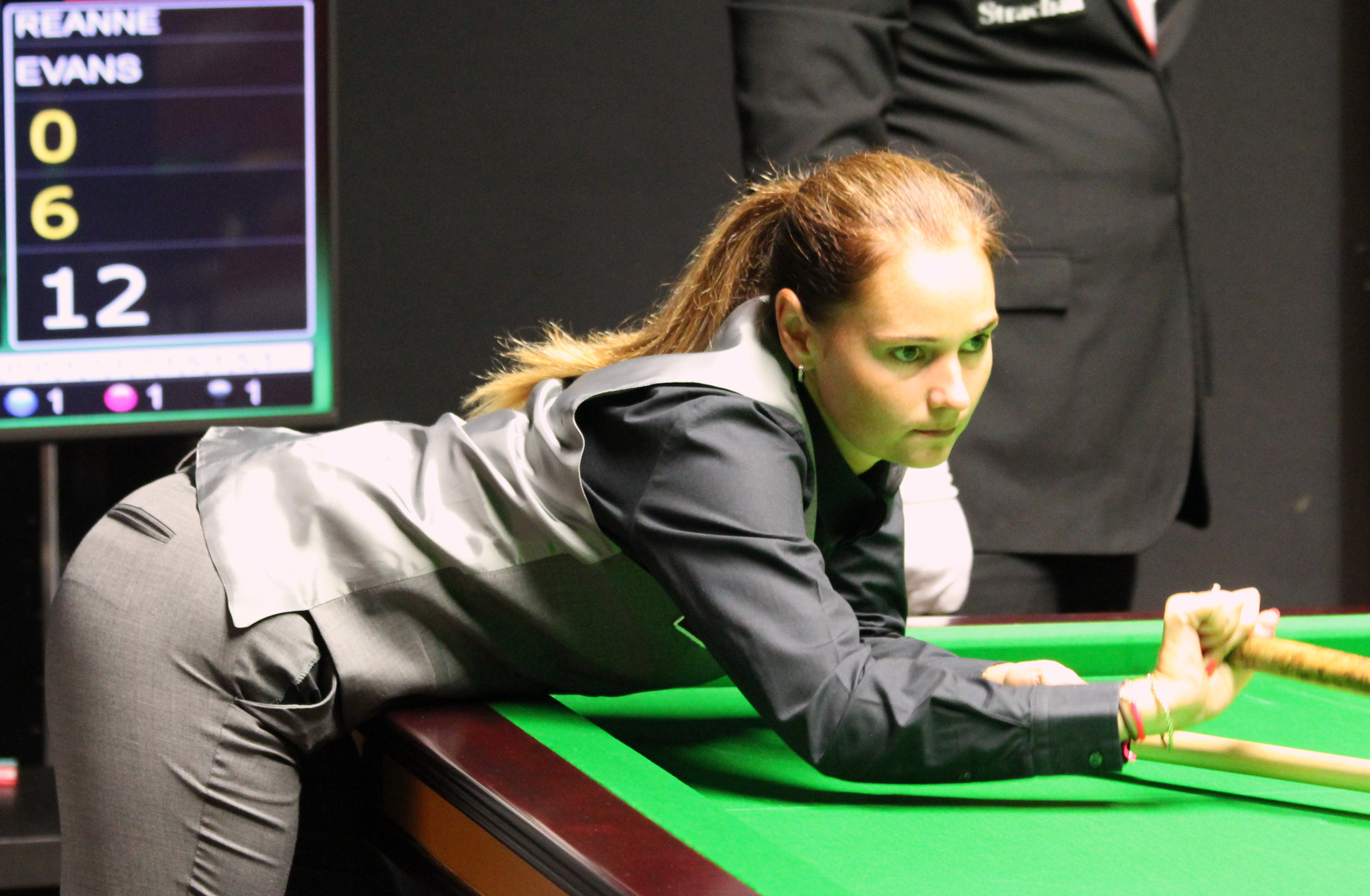
Reanne Evans (pictured in 2017) won her second professional match of the season.

The first qualifying round was played on 4 and 5 February. 12‑time Women's World champion Reanne Evans defeated Belgium's Julien Leclercq 4‍–‍1, despite her highest break in the match being a 40 break in the third frame to lead 3‍–‍0. Welsh player Liam Davies beat Antoni Kowalski 4‍–‍1, making a high break of 134, while Liam Pullen overcame Kreishh Gurbaxani 4‍–‍3, with the deciding frame being won on the final black. Liam Graham defeated Iulian Boiko 4‍–‍3 while Ishpreet Singh Chadha whitewashed former Women's World champion Baipat Siripaporn. In an all‑Welsh contest, Dylan Emery overcame Duane Jones 4‍–‍2. In three whitewash victories, Jimmy White beat amateur player Joshua Thomond, Oliver Lines made a high break of 136 in defeating former Pan‑American champion Ahmed Aly Elsayed 4‍–‍0 and Stan Moody beat Chris Totten without dropping a frame. Amateur Austrian player Florian Nüßle made the highest break of the round, a 143, in defeating Jiang Jun 4‍–‍3.

==== Round 2 ====
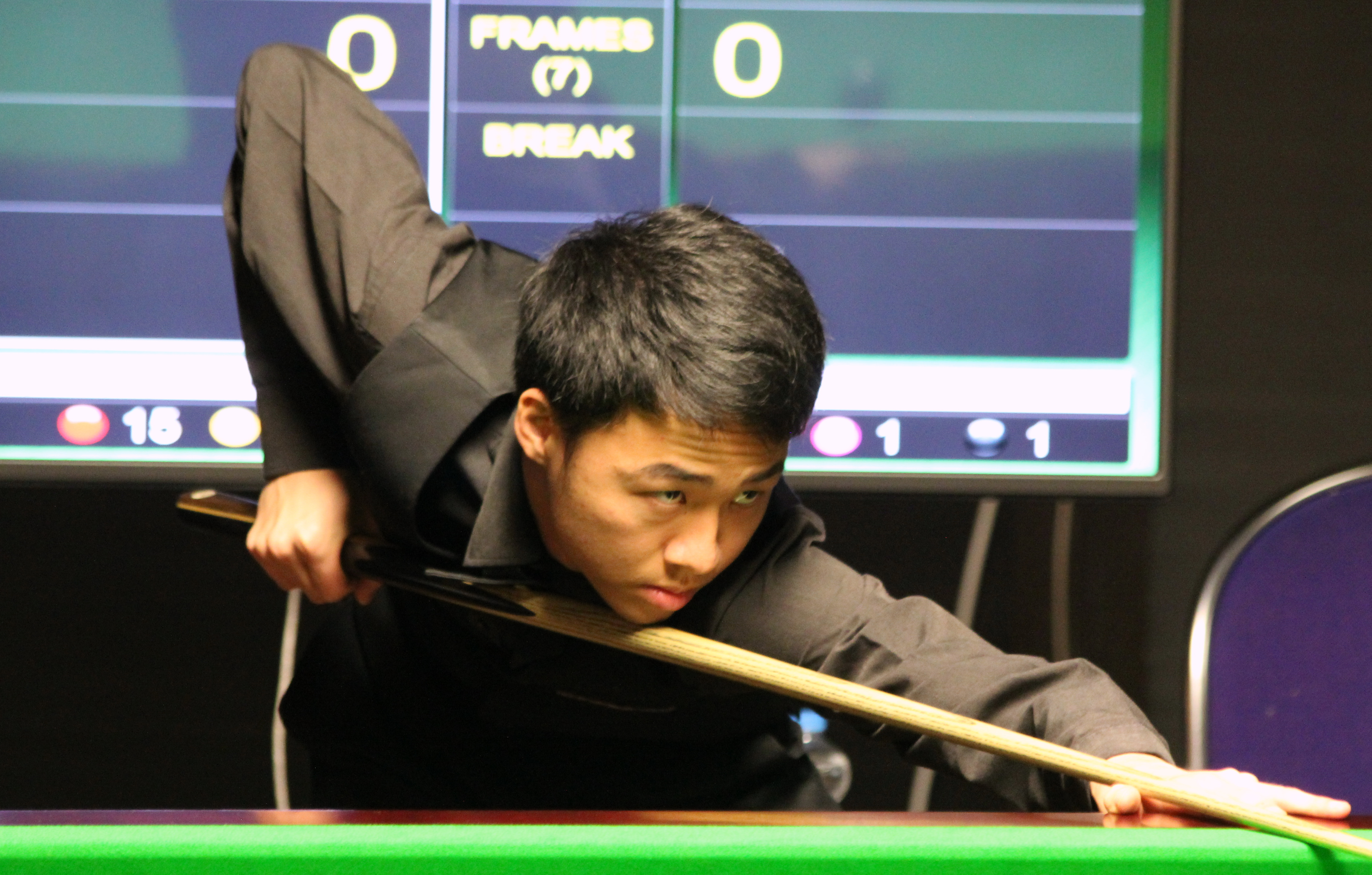
Xu Si (pictured in 2017) made his third career maximum break in qualifying.

The second qualifying round was played on 5 and 6 February. Amateur Welsh player Dylan Emery defeated reigning Scottish Open champion Lei Peifan 4‍–‍3, while Ishpreet Singh Chadha whitewashed Ashley Carty, making breaks of above 80 in every frame including a 104 century in the fourth. Welshman Dominic Dale, playing in his final season as a professional, defeated Mitchell Mann 4‍–‍3 and Jimmy Robertson came from 0‍–‍3 down to defeat Allan Taylor 4‍–‍3. Reanne Evans was whitewashed by Joe O'Connor while Andrew Higginson overturned a 2‍–‍3 deficit to defeat He Guoqiang 4‍–‍3. Xu Si made the third maximum break of his career in the fourth frame of his 4‍–‍2 victory over Bulcsú Révész. Xu made the three 147s within 15 months as he made his first at the UK Championship in November 2023. No other player has had three maximums over that period. Welshman Liam Davies qualified for the main stages by overcoming a 1‍–‍3 deficit to Anthony McGill to defeat the Scotsman 4‍–‍3, making 2 century breaks in the last 3 frames. Ricky Walden, having recently been forced to withdraw from the 2025 German Masters mid‑tournament due to pancreatitis, beat Artemijs Žižins 4‍–‍2 while Thepchaiya Un-Nooh was defeated 2‍–‍4 by Ben Mertens. Martin O'Donnell, who was runner‑up in the previous year's edition of the event, was whitewashed by Hong Kong's Wang Yuchen. Yuan Sijun defeated Amir Sarkhosh 4‍–‍0 and Jimmy White was narrowly beaten 3‍–‍4 by Scott Donaldson. Welshman Jamie Clarke defeated Louis Heathcote 4‍–‍2 while Stan Moody overcame Anthony Hamilton by the same 4‍–‍2 scoreline, making a top break of 134. Hong Kong's Marco Fu whitewashed David Grace while amateur player Florian Nüßle beat Liu Hongyu 4‍–‍3 and Matthew Stevens defeated Hammad Miah 4‍–‍1.

=== Main stages ===
==== Last 64 ====
The last 64 matches were played on 10 and 11 February as the best of 7 frames. Ishpreet Singh Chadha defeated defending champion Gary Wilson 4‍–‍3, Mark Williams made three century breaks in his 4‍–‍1 win over Florian Nüßle, and Mark Selby beat Haydon Pinhey 4‍–‍2. Mark Allen recovered from 0‍–‍2 down to beat Stan Moody 4‍–‍3, and John Higgins whitewashed Graeme Dott. Ronnie O'Sullivan withdrew and so Jamie Clarke was given a walkover to the last 32. Ma Hailong defeated Shaun Murphy 4‍–‍3, Sanderson Lam beat Barry Hawkins 4‍–‍1, and Matthew Selt whitewashed Ricky Walden. Hossein Vafaei beat Fan Zhengyi 4‍–‍2, Luca Brecel recovered from 0‍–‍2 down to defeat Stuart Carrington 4‍–‍2, and Chris Wakelin beat Michael Holt 4‍–‍3.

==== Last 32 ====
The last 32 matches were played on 12 February as the best of 7 frames. Stephen Maguire defeated Mark Williams 4‍–‍2, Tom Ford beat Neil Robertson 4‍–‍3, Yuan Sijun beat Mark Allen, also by 4‍–‍3, and John Higgins whitewashed Robert Milkins. Joe O'Connor beat Kyren Wilson 4‍–‍3, Luca Brecel defeated Noppon Saengkham 4‍–‍2, and Jack Lisowski beat Chris Wakelin 4‍–‍1.

==== Last 16 ====
The last 16 matches were played on 13 February as the best of 7 frames. Jackson Page whitewashed Tom Ford, and John Higgins whitewashed Yuan Sijun. Stephen Maguire beat Sanderson Lam 4‍–‍2, and Joe O'Connor defeated Matthew Stevens 4‍–‍1. Luca Brecel beat Pang Junxu 4‍–‍1, Mark Selby whitewashed Jamie Jones, Ali Carter beat Ryan Day 4‍–‍1, and Jack Lisowski defeated Matthew Selt 4‍–‍2.

==== Quarter finals ====
The quarter‑finals were played on 14 February as the best of 9 frames.

In the afternoon session, in a match that lasted five hours, Mark Selby beat John Higgins 5‍–‍4. After the match, Selby said: "We both struggled and brought each other down, there were a lot of scrappy frames, if one of us had played better, the other might have raised his game. The only positive for me is that I got over the line and I can only improve tomorrow. If I had lost I would have been gutted, but now I can put that behind me." Higgins commented: "It was a mammoth game, I gave it everything. I know the shots but I've got deficiencies in my game. I just can't bring myself to play the right shot, that's the disappointing thing." Luca Brecel defeated Jackson Page 5‍–‍2. Brecel commented: "I enjoyed the game and took my chances."

In the evening session Stephen Maguire beat Jack Lisowski 5‍–‍3. After the match Maguire said: "Jack [Lisowski] looked brilliant early on, I thought he was going to make a maximum in the fourth frame, I managed to nick that one and it changed the match. My cueing was a lot better tonight, though I still threw in a few stupid shots and I'm a long way off my best." Ali Carter beat Joe O'Connor 5‍–‍3. After the match Carter said: "I came here feeling very rough with a virus, I just had to get through the early rounds to give myself a chance, At the interval I said to my coach Chris Henry that I still felt I could play well and I was just going to go for it. I have played some turgid stuff this week, but that was by far my best tonight from 3‍–‍1 down."

==== Semi finals ====
The semi‑finals were played on 15 February as the best of 11 frames.

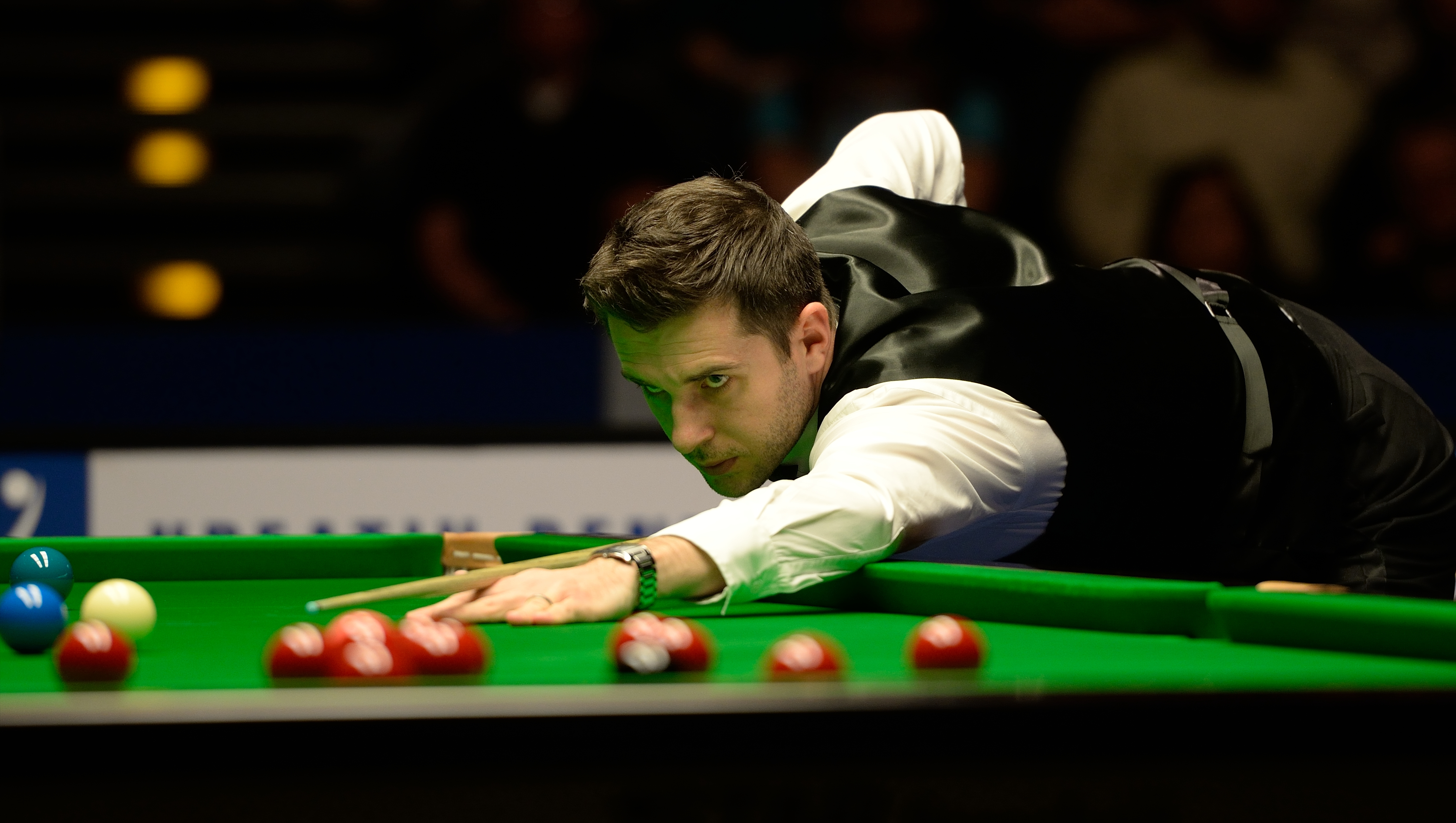
Mark Selby beat Luca Brecel 6‍–‍3 in the semi‑final

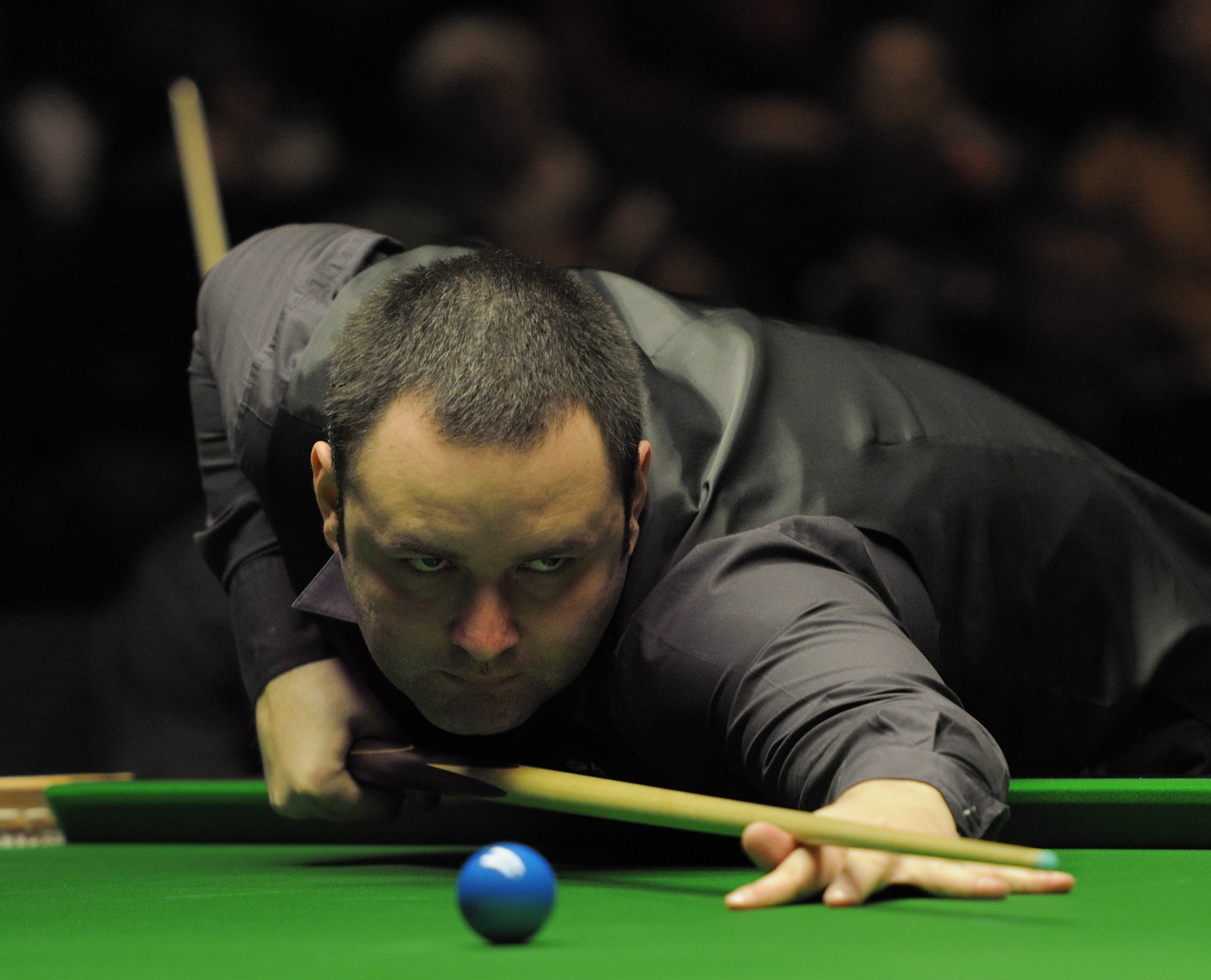
Stephen Maguire beat Ali Carter 6‍–‍4 in the semi‑final

In the afternoon session Mark Selby came back from 2‍–‍3 down to take four frames in a row and beat Luca Brecel 6‍–‍3. After the match Selby said: "I got stronger as it went on, from 3‍–‍2 down that was the most composed I have felt all week. I lost my way a bit after the interval. The match turned on the plant Luca [Brecel] went for at 3‍–‍3, it was probably a one in ten shot and perhaps he shouldn't have gone for it. ... Winning the Championship League gave me confidence. I have lacked consistency at times this season so it has been great this week to put a run together. I'll enjoy the final tomorrow but I will be trying my hardest and determined to win." Brecel commented: "I didn't play well enough, I missed too many chances. I felt I was playing well enough to win the tournament, but Mark [Selby] was a very tough opponent today."

In the evening session Stephen Maguire beat Ali Carter 6‍–‍4. After the match Maguire said: "It was a scrap from start to finish and I'm very happy to come out on the right end. I have done well in the scrappy frames this week because I have not been scoring well, I haven't even made a century. Working with Chris (Small) has definitely helped me. A few months ago I was losing to players who I didn't feel should be beating me. I made the call to Chris and he stripped my game back to basics. Maybe this is the reward. It's nice to be in the World Grand Prix now but for me it's all about trying to win the title. I'll only enjoy it tomorrow if I win."

==== Final ====
The final was played on 16 February as the best of 17 frames, played over two sessions.

Mark Selby, contesting his 36th ranking final, faced Stephen Maguire, who was contesting his 14th. At the end of the afternoon session the score was level at 4‍–‍4. Selby was never behind at any stage in the match and won 9‍–‍6 to claim his second Welsh Open title having previously been champion in 2008. It was also his 24th ranking event title. After the match Selby said: "At 6‍–‍5 I missed an easy red and the clearance Stephen [Maguire] made was ridiculous. That could have been a turning point but I managed to get ahead again in the next frame. I had run of the ball at key moments, that can be the difference at this level. It's great to see Stephen playing well and back in a final because he is a class act." Maguire commented: "I want to say thanks to the crowd, it was unreal to have that much support. When I made the clearance for 6‍–‍6 I wanted to carry on, the interval came at the wrong time for me. From 6‍–‍6 I hardly had a chance so all credit to Mark [Selby]."

== Main draw ==
The results of the main draw are shown below. Numbers in parentheses after the players' names denote the top 32 seeds, an "a" indicates amateur players who were not on the main World Snooker Tour, and players in bold denote match winners.

=== Top half ===
**Last 64**; Best of 7 frames
Gary Wilson (ENG) (1)	3
**Ishpreet Singh Chadha (IND)**	**4**
**Jackson Page (WAL) (32)**	**4**
Jimmy Robertson (ENG)	2
**Tom Ford (ENG) (16)**	**4**
Andrew Higginson (ENG)	2
**Neil Robertson (AUS) (17)**	**4**
Mark Davis (ENG)	2
**Pang Junxu (CHN) (24)**	**4**
Dominic Dale (WAL)	2
**Zhang Anda (CHN) (9)**	**4**
Ross Muir (SCO)	2
**Noppon Saengkham (THA) (25)**	**4**
Dylan Emery (WAL) (a)	1
**Luca Brecel (BEL) (8)**	**4**
Stuart Carrington (ENG)	2
**Mark Selby (ENG) (5)**	**4**
Haydon Pinhey (ENG)	2
**Elliot Slessor (ENG) (28)**	**4**
Liam Davies (WAL)	0
Si Jiahui (CHN) (12)	2
**Jamie Jones (WAL)**	**4**
Stuart Bingham (ENG) (21)	0
**Robbie Williams (ENG)**	**4**
**Robert Milkins (ENG) (20)**	**4**
Wang Yuchen (HKG)	1
**John Higgins (SCO) (13)**	**4**
Graeme Dott (SCO)	0
Zhou Yuelong (CHN) (29)	1
**Yuan Sijun (CHN)**	**4**
**Mark Allen (NIR) (4)**	**4**
Stan Moody (ENG)	3

**Last 32**; Best of 7 frames
(India) Ishpreet Singh Chadha	2
**(Wales) Jackson Page (32)**	**4**
**(England) Tom Ford (16)**	**4**
(Australia) Neil Robertson (17)	3
**(China) Pang Junxu (24)**	**4**
(China) Zhang Anda (9)	2
(Thailand) Noppon Saengkham (25)	2
**(Belgium) Luca Brecel (8)**	**4**
**(England) Mark Selby (5)**	**4**
(England) Elliot Slessor (28)	3
**(Wales) Jamie Jones**	**4**
(England) Robbie Williams	2
(England) Robert Milkins (20)	0
**(Scotland) John Higgins (13)**	**4**
**(China) Yuan Sijun**	**4**
(Northern Ireland) Mark Allen (4)	3

**Last 16**; Best of 7 frames
**(Wales) Jackson Page (32)**	**4**
(England) Tom Ford (16)	0
(China) Pang Junxu (24)	1
**(Belgium) Luca Brecel (8)**	**4**
**(England) Mark Selby (5)**	**4**
(Wales) Jamie Jones	0
**(Scotland) John Higgins (13)**	**4**
(China) Yuan Sijun	0

**Quarter-finals**; Best of 9 frames
(Wales) Jackson Page (32)	2
**(Belgium) Luca Brecel (8)**	**5**
**(England) Mark Selby (5)**	**5**
(Scotland) John Higgins (13)	4

**Semi-finals**; Best of 11 frames
(Belgium) Luca Brecel (8)	3
**(England) Mark Selby (5)**	**6**

=== Bottom half ===
**Last 64**; Best of 7 frames
Ronnie O'Sullivan (ENG) (3) (Note: Ronnie O'Sullivan withdrew and so Jamie Clarke was given a walkover to the last 32.)	w/d
**Jamie Clarke (WAL)**	**w/o**
**Matthew Selt (ENG) (30)**	**4**
Ricky Walden (ENG)	0
**Chris Wakelin (ENG) (14)**	**4**
Michael Holt (ENG)	3
**Jack Lisowski (ENG) (19)**	**4**
Joshua Cooper (ENG) (a)	0
**Wu Yize (CHN) (22)**	**4**
Scott Donaldson (SCO)	3
Barry Hawkins (ENG) (11)	1
**Sanderson Lam (ENG)**	**4**
**Stephen Maguire (SCO) (27)**	**4**
Xu Si (CHN)	2
**Mark Williams (WAL) (6)**	**4**
Florian Nüßle (AUT) (a)	1
Shaun Murphy (ENG) (7)	3
**Ma Hailong (CHN)**	**4**
**Ryan Day (WAL) (26)**	**4**
Ben Mertens (BEL)	2
**Ali Carter (ENG) (10)**	**4**
Rory Thor (MAS)	0
**Hossein Vafaei (IRN) (23)**	**4**
Fan Zhengyi (CHN)	2
**David Gilbert (ENG) (18)**	**4**
Jordan Brown (NIR)	3
Jak Jones (WAL) (15)	2
**Matthew Stevens (WAL)**	**4**
Lyu Haotian (CHN) (31)	0
**Joe O'Connor (ENG)**	**4**
**Kyren Wilson (ENG) (2)**	**4**
Marco Fu (HKG)	3

**Last 32**; Best of 7 frames
(Wales) Jamie Clarke	3
**(England) Matthew Selt (30)**	**4**
(England) Chris Wakelin (14)	1
**(England) Jack Lisowski (19)**	**4**
(China) Wu Yize (22)	2
**(England) Sanderson Lam**	**4**
**(Scotland) Stephen Maguire (27)**	**4**
(Wales) Mark Williams (6)	2
(China) Ma Hailong	2
**(Wales) Ryan Day (26)**	**4**
**(England) Ali Carter (10)**	**4**
(Iran) Hossein Vafaei (23)	2
(England) David Gilbert (18)	3
**(Wales) Matthew Stevens**	**4**
**(England) Joe O'Connor**	**4**
(England) Kyren Wilson (2)	3

**Last 16**; Best of 7 frames
(England) Matthew Selt (30)	2
**(England) Jack Lisowski (19)**	**4**
(England) Sanderson Lam	2
**(Scotland) Stephen Maguire (27)**	**4**
(Wales) Ryan Day (26)	1
**(England) Ali Carter (10)**	**4**
(Wales) Matthew Stevens	1
**(England) Joe O'Connor**	**4**

**Quarter-finals**; Best of 9 frames
(England) Jack Lisowski (19)	3
**(Scotland) Stephen Maguire (27)**	**5**
**(England) Ali Carter (10)**	**5**
(England) Joe O'Connor	3

**Semi-finals**; Best of 11 frames
**(Scotland) Stephen Maguire (27)**	**6**
(England) Ali Carter (10)	4

Note: w/d=withdrawn; w/o=walkover

=== Final ===
Final: Best of 17 frames. Referee: Desislava Bozhilova; Venue Cymru, Llandudno, Wales, 16 February 2025
**Mark Selby** (5); England	**9**–6	Stephen Maguire (27); Scotland
Afternoon: **63**–21, **58**–30, 23–**69**, **108**–24, 24–**70**, 0–**91**, **128**–6 (116), 41–**81**; Evening: **63**–55, 26–**74**, **67**–7, 60–**71**, **73**–0, **128**–0 (128), **67**–8
(frame 14) **128**	Highest break	81 (frame 8)
**2**	Century breaks	0

== Qualifying rounds ==
The results of the qualifying rounds are shown below. Numbers in parentheses after the players' names denote the players' seeding, an "a" indicates amateur players who were not on the main World Snooker Tour, and players in bold denote match winners.

**Round 1 (Last 128)**; Best of 7 frames
**Ishpreet Singh Chadha (IND) (65)**	**4**
Baipat Siripaporn (THA) (116)	0
**Allan Taylor (ENG) (96)**	**4**
Haris Tahir (PAK) (100)	3
**Andrew Higginson (ENG) (80)**	**4**
Daniel Womersley (ENG) (a)	0
**Liam Graham (SCO) (81)**	**4**
Iulian Boiko (UKR) (a)	3
Dean Young (SCO) (88)	3
**Mitchell Mann (ENG) (111)**	**4**
**Ross Muir (SCO) (73)**	**4**
Manasawin Phetmalaikul (THA) (108)	2
Duane Jones (WAL) (89)	2
**Dylan Emery (WAL) (a)**	**4**
**Stuart Carrington** (ENG) (72)	**w/o**
Bai Yulu (CHN) (107) (Note: Bai Yulu withdrew and so Stuart Carrington was given a walkover to the second round of qualifying.)	w/d
Xing Zihao (CHN) (69)	3
**Haydon Pinhey (ENG) (99)**	**4**
Antoni Kowalski (POL) (92)	1
**Liam Davies (WAL) (98)**	**4**
**Ian Burns (ENG) (76)**	**4**
Mostafa Dorgham (EGY) (103)	0
**Liam Pullen (ENG) (85)**	**4**
Kreishh Gurbaxani (IND) (110)	3
Zak Surety (ENG) (84)	2
**Wang Yuchen (HKG) (102)**	**4**
**Oliver Lines (ENG) (77)**	**4**
Ahmed Aly Elsayed (USA) (115)	0
**Amir Sarkhosh (IRN) (93)**	**4**
Cheung Ka Wai (HKG) (97)	3
**Stan Moody (ENG) (68)**	**4**
Chris Totten (SCO) (101)	0

**Round 2 (Last 96)**; Best of 7 frames
Ashley Carty (ENG) (64)	0
**Ishpreet Singh Chadha (IND) (65)**	**4**
**Jimmy Robertson (ENG) (33)**	**4**
Allan Taylor (ENG) (96)	3
He Guoqiang (CHN) (49)	3
**Andrew Higginson (ENG) (80)**	**4**
**Mark Davis (ENG) (48)**	**4**
Liam Graham (SCO) (81)	2
**Dominic Dale (WAL) (41)**	**4**
Mitchell Mann (ENG) (111)	3
David Lilley (ENG) (56)	3
**Ross Muir (SCO) (73)**	**4**
Lei Peifan (CHN) (40)	3
**Dylan Emery (WAL) (a)**	**4**
Long Zehuang (CHN) (57)	3
**Stuart Carrington (ENG) (72)**	**4**
Tian Pengfei (CHN) (60)	3
**Haydon Pinhey (ENG) (99)**	**4**
Anthony McGill (SCO) (37)	3
**Liam Davies (WAL) (98)**	**4**
**Jamie Jones (WAL) (53)**	**4**
Ian Burns (ENG) (76)	1
**Robbie Williams (ENG) (44)**	**4**
Liam Pullen (ENG) (85)	1
Martin O'Donnell (ENG) (45)	0
**Wang Yuchen (HKG) (102)**	**4**
**Graeme Dott (SCO) (52)**	**4**
Oliver Lines (ENG) (77)	3
**Yuan Sijun (CHN) (36)**	**4**
Amir Sarkhosh (IRN) (93)	0
Anthony Hamilton (ENG) (61)	3
**Stan Moody (ENG) (68)**	**4**

**Round 1 (Last 128)**; Best of 7 frames
**Louis Heathcote (ENG) (67)**	**4**
Robbie McGuigan (NIR) (104)	1
**Artemijs Žižins (LVA) (94)**	**4**
Farakh Ajaib (PAK) (105)	0
**Michael Holt (ENG) (78)**	**4**
Hatem Yassen (EGY) (114)	0
Alexander Ursenbacher (SUI) (83) (Note: Alexander Ursenbacher withdrew and so Joshua Cooper was given a walkover to the second round of qualifying.)	w/d
**Joshua Cooper** (ENG) (a)	**w/o**
**Jimmy White (ENG) (86)**	**4**
Joshua Thomond (ENG) (a)	0
**Alfie Burden (ENG) (75)**	**4**
Paul Deaville (ENG) (a)	0
**Bulcsú Révész (HUN) (91)**	**4**
Anton Kazakov (UKR) (a)	2
Jiang Jun (CHN) (70)	3
**Florian Nüßle (AUT) (a)**	**4**
**Ma Hailong (CHN) (71)**	**4**
Oliver Briffett-Payne (WAL) (a)	1
**Ben Mertens (BEL) (90)**	**4**
Simon Blackwell (ENG) (a)	2
**Rory Thor (MAS) (74)**	**4**
Riley Powell (WAL) (a)	3
**Andrew Pagett (WAL) (87)**	**4**
Mink Nutcharut (THA) (109)	3
**Gong Chenzhi (CHN) (82)**	**4**
Ken Doherty (IRL) (117)	0
**Hammad Miah** (ENG) (79)	**w/o**
Huang Jiahao (CHN) (106) (Note: Huang Jiahao withdrew and so Hammad Miah was given a walkover to the second round of qualifying.)	w/d
Julien Leclercq (BEL) (95)	1
**Reanne Evans (ENG) (112)**	**4**
**Marco Fu (HKG) (66)**	**4**
Jonas Luz (BRA) (113)	0

**Round 2 (Last 96)**; Best of 7 frames
**Jamie Clarke (WAL) (62)**	**4**
Louis Heathcote (ENG) (67)	2
**Ricky Walden (ENG) (35)**	**4**
Artemijs Žižins (LVA) (94)	2
Daniel Wells (WAL) (51)	1
**Michael Holt (ENG) (78)**	**4**
Ben Woollaston (ENG) (46)	2
**Joshua Cooper (ENG) (a)**	**4**
**Scott Donaldson (SCO) (43)**	**4**
Jimmy White (ENG) (86)	3
**Sanderson Lam (ENG) (54)**	**4**
Alfie Burden (ENG) (75)	2
**Xu Si (CHN) (38)**	**4**
Bulcsú Révész (HUN) (91)	2
Liu Hongyu (CHN) (59)	3
**Florian Nüßle (AUT) (a)**	**4**
Joe Perry (ENG) (58)	2
**Ma Hailong (CHN) (71)**	**4**
Thepchaiya Un-Nooh (THA) (39)	2
**Ben Mertens (BEL) (90)**	**4**
Aaron Hill (IRL) (55)	2
**Rory Thor (MAS) (74)**	**4**
**Fan Zhengyi (CHN) (42)**	**4**
Andrew Pagett (WAL) (87)	2
**Jordan Brown (NIR) (47)**	**4**
Gong Chenzhi (CHN) (82)	3
**Matthew Stevens (WAL) (50)**	**4**
Hammad Miah (ENG) (79)	1
**Joe O'Connor (ENG) (34)**	**4**
Reanne Evans (ENG) (112)	0
David Grace (ENG) (63)	0
**Marco Fu (HKG) (66)**	**4**

Note: w/d=withdrawn; w/o=walkover

== Century breaks ==
=== Main stage centuries ===
A total of 46 century breaks were made during the main stage of the tournament in Llandudno.

- 141, 131, 128, 116 – Mark Selby
- 139 – Marco Fu
- 138, 105 – Mark Allen
- 137, 123 – Jak Jones
- 131, 123, 112, 111, 106, 105, 100 – Jack Lisowski
- 131, 113, 107 – John Higgins
- 131 – Tom Ford
- 130, 101 – Zhang Anda
- 127, 100 – Shaun Murphy
- 118 – Ali Carter
- 118 – Wang Yuchen
- 117, 101, 100 – Mark Williams
- 117 – Pang Junxu
- 117 – Noppon Saengkham
- 114, 103 – Kyren Wilson
- 113 – Joe O'Connor
- 112 – Yuan Sijun
- 110, 108 – Jamie Jones
- 108, 105 – Luca Brecel
- 105 – Elliot Slessor
- 103 – Ishpreet Singh Chadha
- 103 – Jackson Page
- 103 – Matthew Stevens
- 102 – Matthew Selt
- 102 – Si Jiahui
- 100 – David Gilbert

=== Qualifying stage centuries ===
A total of 26 century breaks were made during the qualifying stage of the tournament in Barnsley.

- 147, 113 – Xu Si
- 143 – Florian Nüßle
- 142, 136 – Rory Thor
- 139, 115 – David Lilley
- 136 – Oliver Lines
- 134, 114, 109 – Liam Davies
- 134 – Stan Moody
- 131 – Ma Hailong
- 124 – Ricky Walden
- 115 – Yuan Sijun
- 113, 102 – Xing Zihao
- 113 – Mark Davis
- 112 – Wang Yuchen
- 111 – Michael Holt
- 109, 104 – Ishpreet Singh Chadha
- 109 – Jimmy Robertson
- 104 – Louis Heathcote
- 103 – Joe Perry
- 102 – Liam Pullen
