= 2025 German Masters =

Snooker tournament

2025 Machineseeker German Masters

Tournament information
- Dates: 27 January – 2 February 2025
- Venue: Tempodrom
- City: Berlin
- Country: Germany
- Organisation: World Snooker Tour
- Format: Ranking event
- Total prize fund: £550,400
- Winner's share: £100,000
- Highest break: Si Jiahui (CHN) (145)

Final
- Champion: Kyren Wilson (ENG)
- Runner-up: Barry Hawkins (ENG)
- Score: 10–9

The 2025 German Masters (officially the 2025 Machineseeker German Masters) was a professional snooker tournament that took place from 27 January to 2 February 2025 at the Tempodrom in Berlin, Germany. The 12th ranking event of the 2024‍–‍25 season, following the 2024 Scottish Open and preceding the 2025 Welsh Open, it was broadcast by Eurosport and Discovery+ in Europe and by other broadcasters internationally. The winner received £100,000 from a total prize fund of £550,400, the Brandon Parker trophy, and a place in the 2025 Champion of Champions invitational event.

Judd Trump was the defending champion, having defeated Si Jiahui 10‍–‍5 in the 2024 final, but Trump lost 2‍–‍5 to Neil Robertson in the last 16. For the first time in the tournament's history, the final went to a deciding frame. Kyren Wilson, the reigning World Champion, defeated Barry Hawkins 10‍–‍9 to win the tournament for a second time, following his previous victory in 2019. It was the ninth ranking title of Wilson's professional career. The event produced 101 century breaks, 31 during the qualifying stage and 70 at the main stage. The highest break of the tournament was a 145 by Si in his last‑64 match against Ken Doherty.

== Overview ==
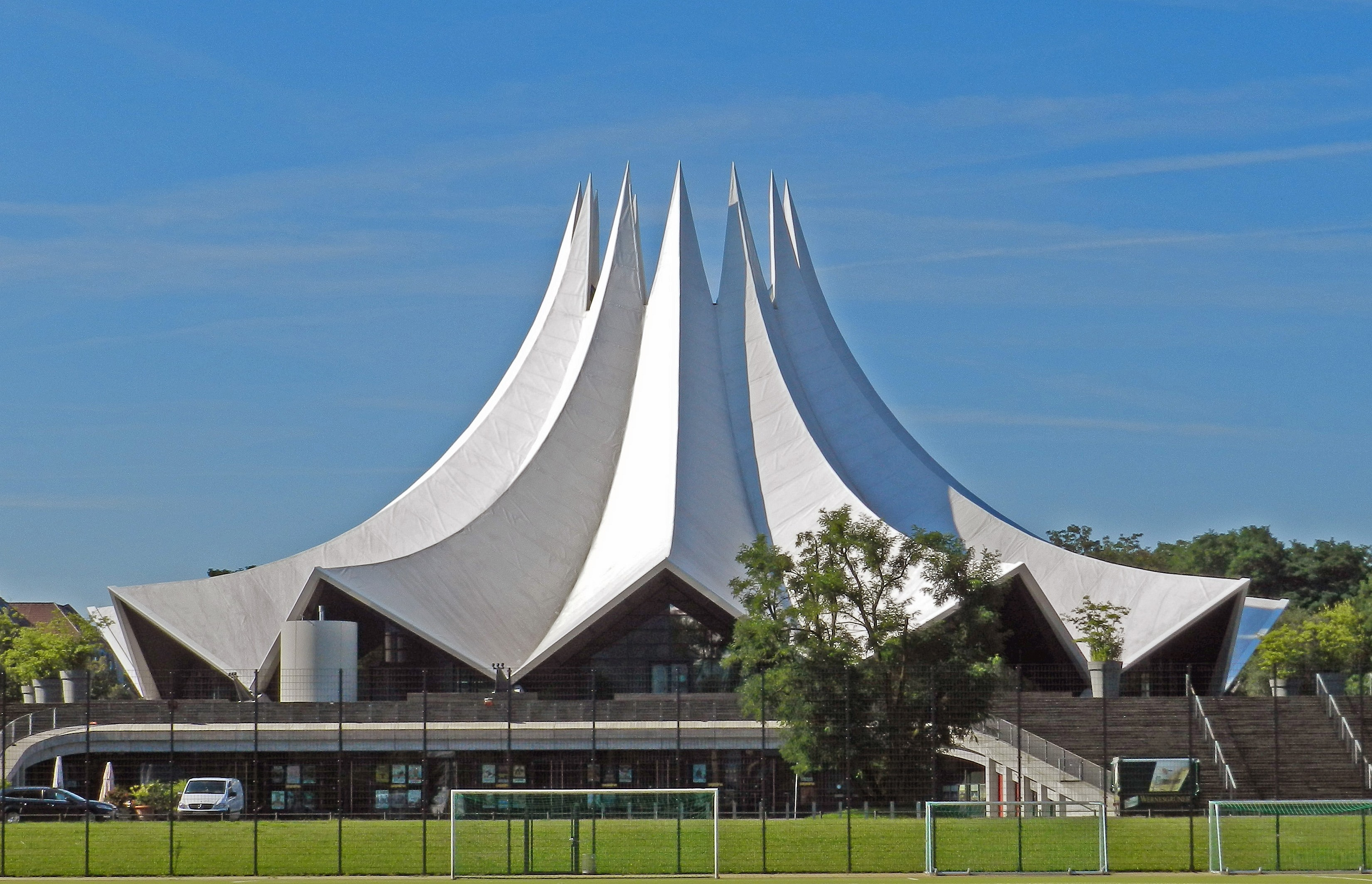
The event was held at the Tempodrom in Berlin.

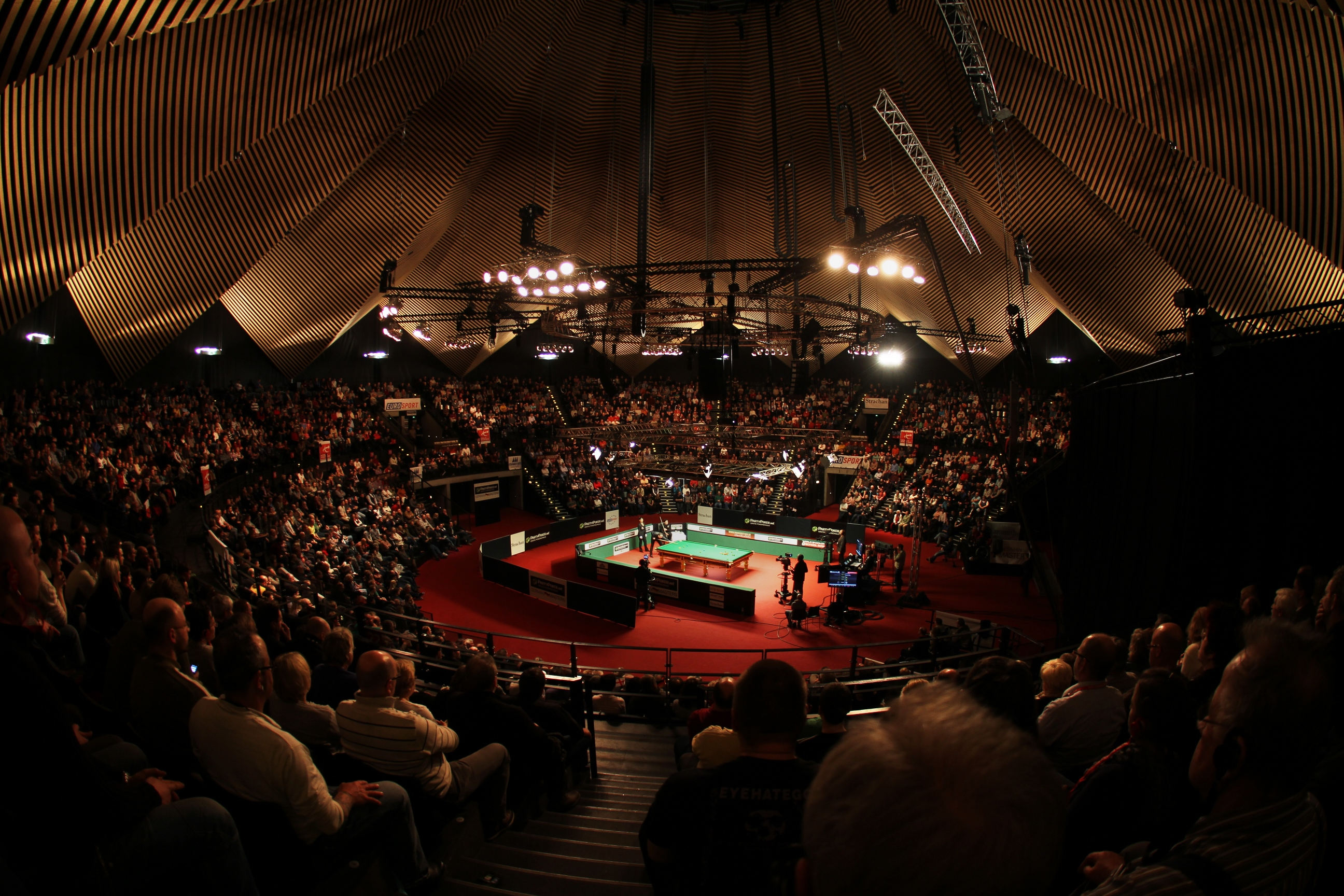
The arena during the final of the 2012 German Masters

The event took place from 27 January to 2 February 2025 at the Tempodrom in Berlin, Germany, with qualifying having been held from 16 to 19 December 2024 at the Ponds Forge International Sports Centre in Sheffield, England. The twelfth ranking event of the 2024‍–‍25 season (following the 2024 Scottish Open and preceding the 2025 Welsh Open), and the only major tournament of the season to be held in mainland Europe, the tournament is the fifteenth edition of the German Masters since 2011. Originally created as the ranking German Open in 1995, and held for three consecutive years in different cities, it was renamed the German Masters in 1998 and held as a non‑ranking event before being discontinued thereafter. It was revived as the ranking German Masters in 2011 and since then has been held at the Tempodrom in Berlin. (Note: The 2021 event moved to the Marshall Arena in Milton Keynes, England, due to the COVID‑19 pandemic.) In 2021, the trophy was named after former World Snooker Tour director Brandon Parker, who died in 2020.

The defending champion was Judd Trump, who won his record third German Masters title in 2024, winning the final 10‍‍–‍5 against China's Si Jiahui who was contesting his first ranking final. Trump was beaten 2‍–‍5 by Neil Robertson in the last‑16 round.

=== Format ===
The WST implemented a new format for the four Home Nations events and the German Masters this season. In qualifying round one, players seeded 65‍–‍96 face those seeded 97‍–‍128. In qualifying round two, the 32 round one winners play those seeded 33‍–‍64. The 32 round two winners then play the top 32 seeds in the first round of the main stage.

All matches up to and including the quarter‑finals were played as best of nine frames. The semi‑finals were best of 11, and the final was a best‑of‑19 frame match played over two sessions.

=== Broadcasters ===
The qualifying rounds were broadcast by Discovery+ in Europe (including the United Kingdom and Ireland) and by the CBSA‑WPBSA Academy WeChat Channel, the CBSA‑WPBSA Academy Douyin and Huya Live in China. They were available from Matchroom Sport in all other territories.

The main event was broadcast by Eurosport and Discovery+ in Europe (including the United Kingdom and Ireland); by the CBSA‑WPBSA Academy WeChat Channel, the CBSA‑WPBSA Academy Douyin, Huya Live and Migu in China; by Now TV in Hong Kong; by Astro SuperSport in Malaysia and Brunei; by True Sports in Thailand; by TAP in the Philippines; and by Sportcast in Taiwan. It was available on WST Play in all other territories.

=== Prize fund ===
The tournament winner received the Brandon Parker trophy and £100,000. The breakdown of prize money for the event, an increase of £123,400 from the previous event, is shown below:

- Winner: £100,000
- Runner-up: £45,000
- Semi-final: £21,000
- Quarter-final: £13,200
- Last 16: £9,000
- Last 32: £5,400
- Last 64: £3,600
- Last 96: £1,000
- Highest break: £5,000
- Total: £550,400

== Summary ==
=== Qualifying ===
==== Round 1 ====
Reigning Women's World Champion Bai Yulu recorded another win in her debut professional season as she defeated Liam Pullen in a deciding frame to win 5‍–‍4. 1997 World Champion Ken Doherty secured his first victory of the season, beating Oliver Lines 5‍–‍4 on the deciding black, despite having led 4‍–‍0. In a match between two rookies, Latvian player Artemijs Žižins defeated Indian professional Kreishh Gurbaxani 5‍–‍4, while Belgian Julien Leclercq made a high break of 131 in beating Jimmy White 5‍–‍2. Other results included whitewash victories for Stuart Carrington and Stan Moody, over Manasawin Phetmalaikul and Ahmed Aly Elsayed respectively. Recent 2024 Scottish Open champion Lei Peifan was defeated 3‍–‍5 by Allan Taylor. Amateur Joshua Thomond defeated Belgian Ben Mertens on a respotted black in the deciding frame to win 5‍–‍4. Reanne Evans won her first match of the season, defeating Amir Sarkhosh 5‍–‍3. Day three saw amateurs Iulian Boiko and Dylan Emery both win 5‍–‍2 over Michael Holt and Louis Heathcote respectively, while 2024 Shoot Out finalist Liam Graham recovered from 0‍–‍4 down to defeat Ma Hailong 5‍–‍4.

==== Round 2 ====
Doherty defeated Jordan Brown 5‍–‍4, winning his second match in a row in a deciding frame. Dominic Dale beat Zak Surety 5‍–‍3 and Žižins beat Matthew Selt 5‍–‍4, fluking the final red in the deciding frame. Scots Anthony McGill & Graeme Dott both won their first games 5‍–‍0, with wins over Haydon Pinhey and Xing Zihao respectively. Bai lost 1‍–‍5 to compatriot Yuan Sijun despite hitting a break of 128, the highest by a woman on the World Snooker Tour since Allison Fisher in 1992. Irish professional Aaron Hill defeated Moody 5‍–‍4 in a deciding frame that lasted 85 minutes and Xu Si compiled a high break of 142 in his 5‍–‍1 win over Leclercq. Joe O'Connor defeated Evans 5‍–‍1, and Antoni Kowalski whitewashed Martin O'Donnell. Graham beat Sanderson Lam 5‍–‍4; and Englishmen Alfie Burden and David Lilley whitewashed Welshmen Jamie Jones and Liam Davies respectively.

=== Main draw ===
==== Last 64 ====
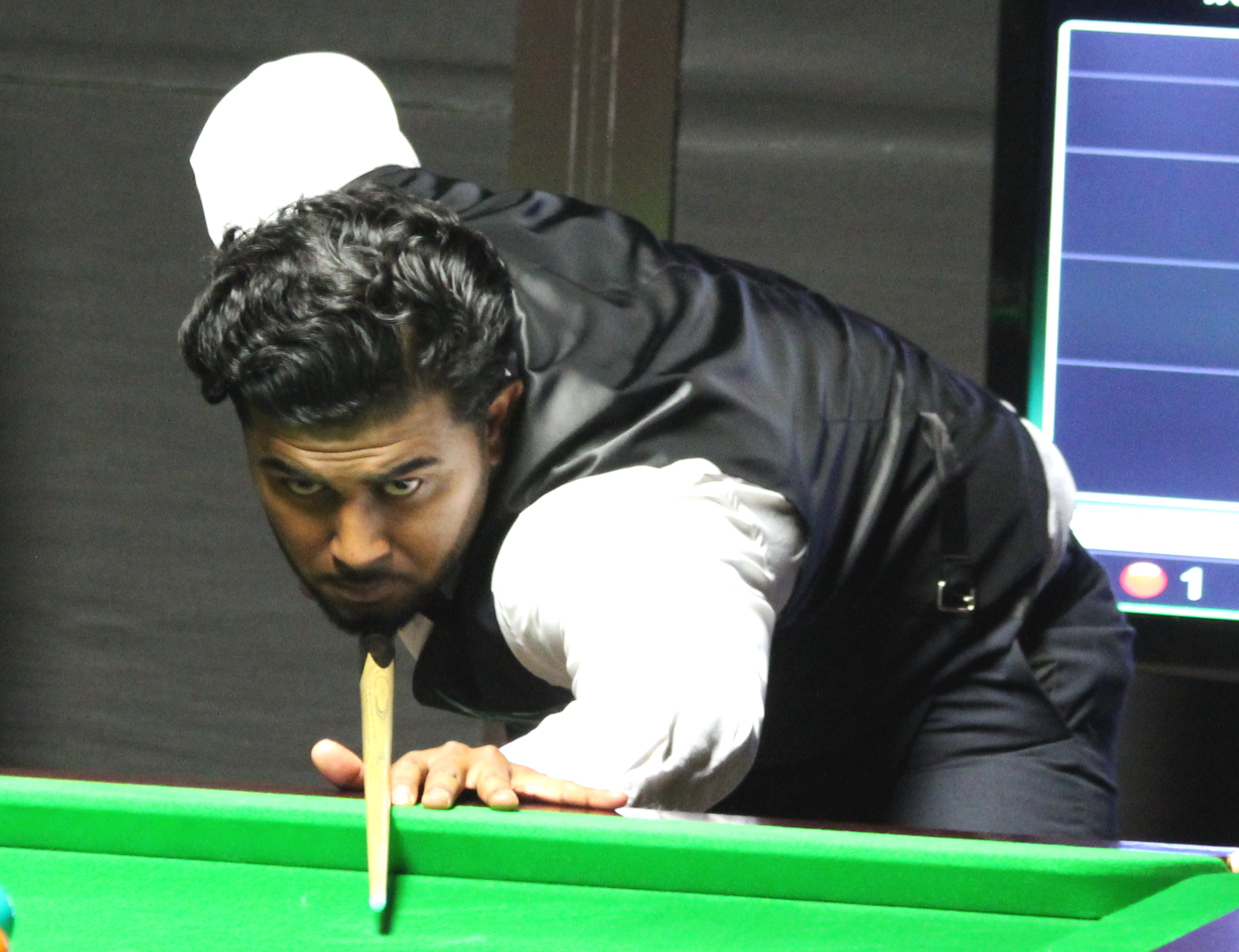
Hammad Miah (pictured in 2016) defeated 16th seed Chris Wakelin in the first round.

The first round was played on 27 and 28 January. Ronnie O'Sullivan, Ding Junhui, Dominic Dale, He Guoqiang and Hossein Vafaei all withdrew before the event, giving their opponents byes to the next round. Reigning World champion Kyren Wilson met Hong Kong's Cheung Ka Wai, defeating him 5‍–‍3 in what was described as an "error‑strewn performance", while Neil Robertson beat Polish rookie Antoni Kowalski 5‍–‍1. John Higgins made 5 breaks of over 50, including a 124 century break, to defeat Mark Davis 5‍–‍3. Higgins said afterwards "Mark has always been really tough and given me some tough battles. It is always a good game when I play him and that was another one." After leading 4‍–‍1, Zhang Anda defeated Graeme Dott 5‍–‍4, while Zhou Yuelong beat Artemijs Žižins 5‍–‍2. Robert Milkins won 5‍–‍4 against Xu Si and Hammad Miah defeated recent Masters debutant Chris Wakelin 5‍–‍2. Defending champion Judd Trump lost the first two frames in his encounter with David Grace to go 0‍–‍2 behind but ultimately won 5‍–‍3 in a match that included a series of lengthy frames that were described as "attritional". Recent Masters champion Shaun Murphy made two century breaks to whitewash Scottish professional Liam Graham 5‍–‍0, saying afterwards "I've had just a couple of days off this week ... I didn't want to come here ... to this venue that I love so much and lose. I'm delighted with the victory and now we march on." Thepchaiya Un-Nooh and Ben Woollaston both recorded whitewash victories as well, defeating Stuart Bingham and David Gilbert respectively. Barry Hawkins overcame Alfie Burden 5‍–‍4, while Jak Jones beat Allan Taylor 5‍–‍3 and Joe O'Connor defeated Stephen Maguire 5‍–‍1.

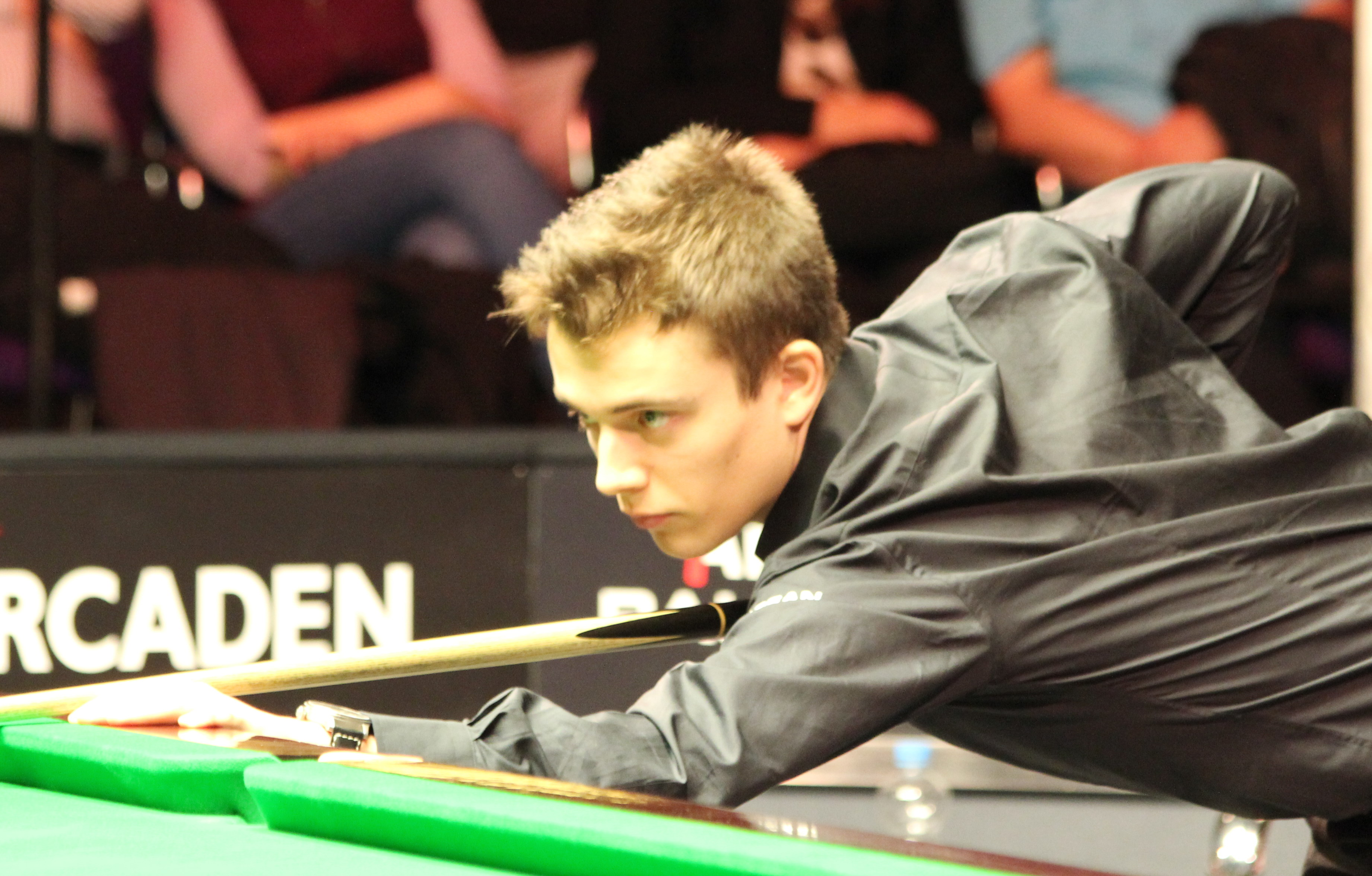
Alexander Ursenbacher (pictured in 2014) became the first native German speaker to win a match at the Tempodrom.

Mark Selby defeated Liu Hongyu 5‍–‍2 and Mark Allen whitewashed David Lilley 5‍–‍0. Allen admitted afterwards that his practice was focused more on the upcoming 2025 World Championship held in Sheffield, England, saying: "To be honest, all eyes are on Sheffield for me now. ... Not taking anything away from the events leading up, but I'll be experimenting here and there to see if I can get something to work." Switzerland's Alexander Ursenbacher defeated Jack Lisowski 5‍–‍3, commenting after the match "I've got so many supporters here. I just thought that at some point a German speaking player had to win a match here. It was a big goal for me." Irish professional Aaron Hill defeated two‑time German Masters champion Mark Williams 5‍–‍2, making a 115 century break in the seventh frame, saying afterwards "I'm delighted, especially the way I finished off in one visit. It is great to beat someone like Mark Williams". Luca Brecel beat Jiang Jun 5‍–‍2 while Gary Wilson was defeated 4‍–‍5 by Daniel Wells.

==== Last 32 ====
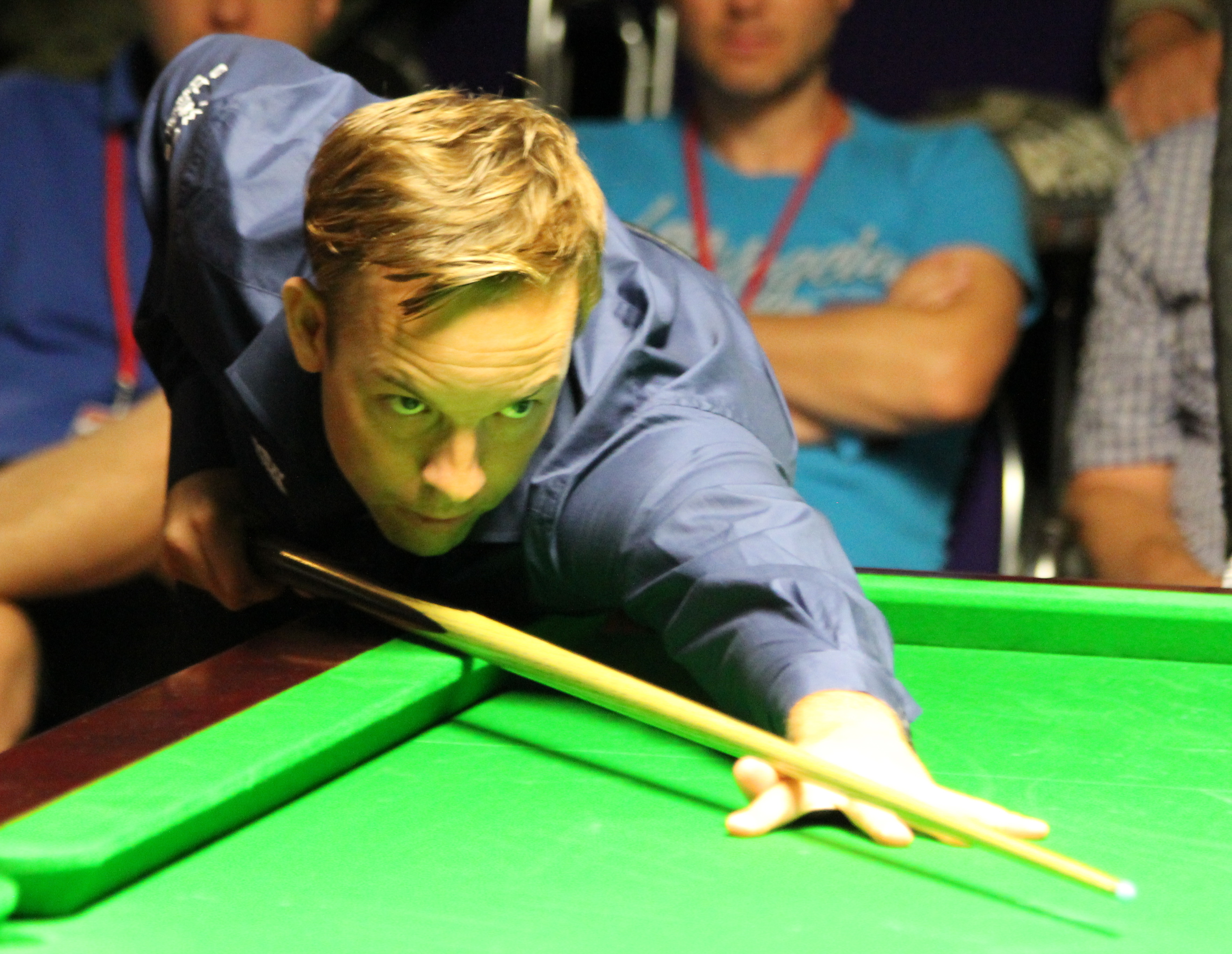
12th seed Ali Carter (pictured in 2015) was whitewashed by Alexander Ursenbacher in his first match.

The second round was played on 29 January. Kyren Wilson went 0‍–‍2 behind against Zhou Yuelong before leveling the match at 2‍–‍2 after requiring a snooker in the third frame. Zhou won the fifth frame but Wilson then took the next three frames to win the match 5‍–‍3. Wilson commented afterwards: "At 2‍–‍0 down today, I was all at sea. I couldn't really settle in the match, but Zhou got off to a great start. I managed to get a snooker in the third frame and that flipped the match on its head." John Higgins won the first two frames of his encounter with Jak Jones but Jones came back to eventually defeat Higgins 5‍–‍3, setting up an encounter with Wilson in the last 16, a repeat of the 2024 World Championship final. Yuan Sijun met Ross Muir, both players having received byes into the second round, with Yuan winning the match 5‍–‍2 and Si Jiahui was defeated 4‍–‍5 by Xiao Guodong, in a repeat of the 2024 Wuhan Open final. Judd Trump whitewashed Joe O'Connor, making breaks of 77, 76, 75, 80 and 100. Two‑time German Masters champion Ali Carter was whitewashed 0‍–‍5 by Alexander Ursenbacher and Wu Yize overcame Mark Allen in a deciding frame to win 5‍–‍4. Neil Robertson made 4 centuries in his 5‍–‍4 victory over Hammad Miah and 2023 World Champion Luca Brecel was beaten 2‍–‍5 by Anthony McGill. Zhang Anda defeated Robert Milkins 5‍–‍2 and Shaun Murphy whitewashed Thai player Thepchaiya Un-Nooh, thereby winning 10 straight frames in the event.

==== Last 16 ====
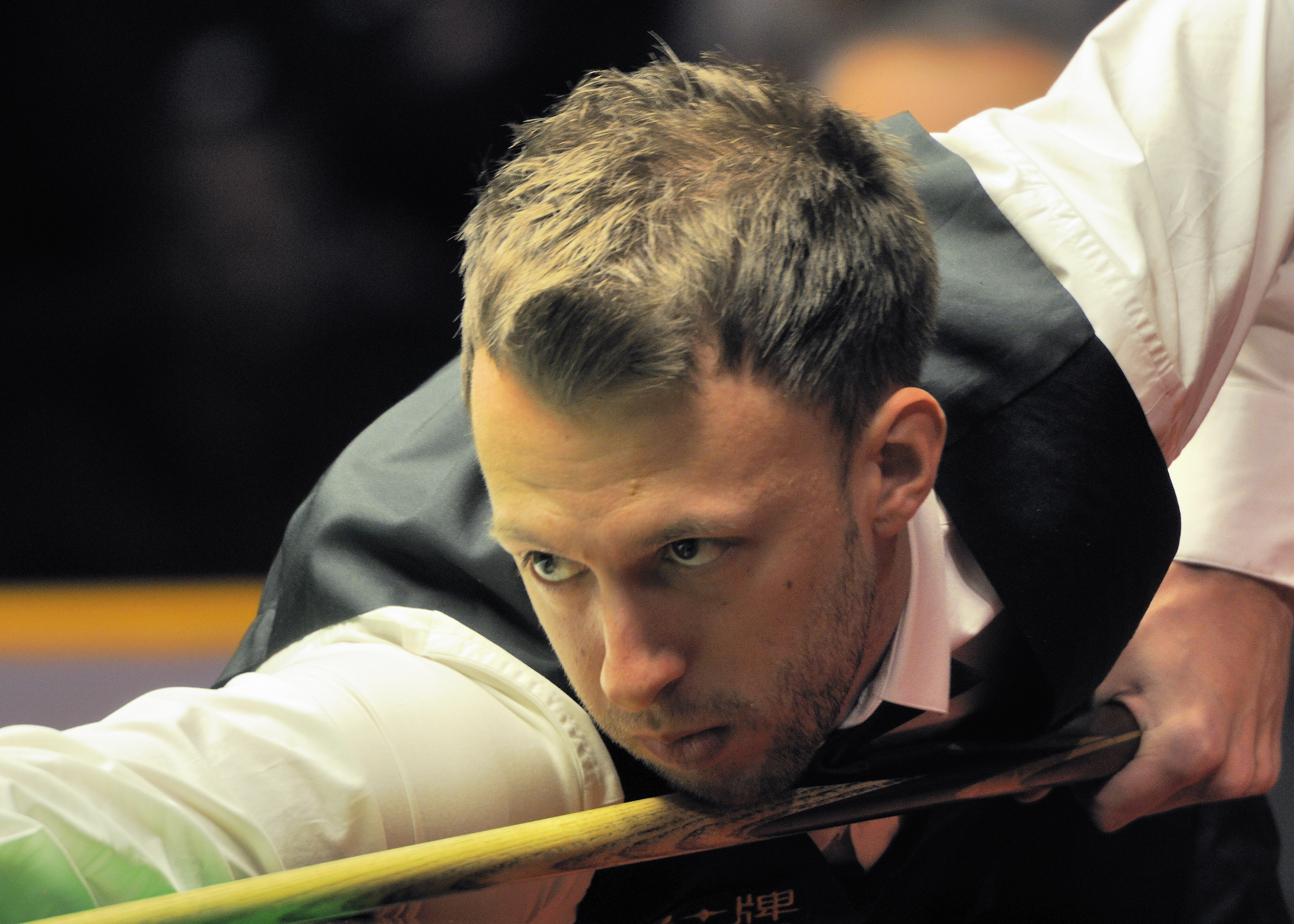
Judd Trump (pictured in 2014) failed to defend his title, losing in the third round to Neil Robertson.

The third round was played on 30 January. Barry Hawkins received a bye into the quarter‑finals after his opponent Ricky Walden withdrew from the event on medical grounds. Defending champion Judd Trump met Neil Robertson. Robertson won a close opening frame and then also took the second on a respotted black to lead 2‍–‍0. Trump equalised the scoreline at 2‍–‍2 but Robertson won the next three frames, making breaks of 86 and 131, to defeat Trump 5‍–‍3. Reigning World champion Kyren Wilson met Jak Jones, a repeat of the previous year's world final. Wilson and Jones shared the first four frames with Wilson making a 112 century break in the second frame but Jones took the fifth with a 123 break to lead 3‍–‍2. Wilson then won the next three frames, making a break of 103 in the sixth, to defeat Jones 5‍–‍3. After leading 4‍–‍0, Aaron Hill defeated Tom Ford 5‍–‍3 to reach his second career quarter‑final. HIll said afterwards: "The crowd has been amazing all week. ... I think they like an underdog. Hopefully they can stay on my side." Xiao Guodong defeated Elliot Slessor 5‍–‍1 and Wu Yize beat Alexander Ursenbacher 5‍–‍2.

==== Quarter finals ====
The quarter‑finals were played on 31 January. Anthony McGill won the first two frames against Kyren Wilson to lead 2‍–‍0 but after leading by 54 points in the third, Wilson cleared to the black to go 1‍–‍2 behind. McGill made a 134 break to win the fourth frame but Wilson then won the next two to level the score at 3‍–‍3. The next two frames were shared but Wilson made a 72 break in the decider to win the match 5‍–‍4. He commented after the match: "I'm proud of that break in the deciding frame because that took a lot of bottle. ... I was desperate to get over the line in that match and be a part of semi‑final Saturday." Competing in only his second career quarter‑final, Aaron Hill faced Xiao Guodong who made breaks of 95, 75, 114 and 113 to whitewash Hill 5‍–‍0. Yuan Sijun gained a 3‍–‍1 and 4‍–‍2 advantage on Neil Robertson, making a century break in the third frame, before Robertson won the seventh and eighth frames to level the score at 4‍–‍4. Yuan then made a break of 57 in the deciding frame to defeat Robertson 5‍–‍4. Barry Hawkins defeated Wu Yize 5‍–‍3, making a high break of 138, with Hawkins praising the crowd after the match, saying "the German fans are probably the best in the world."

==== Semi finals ====
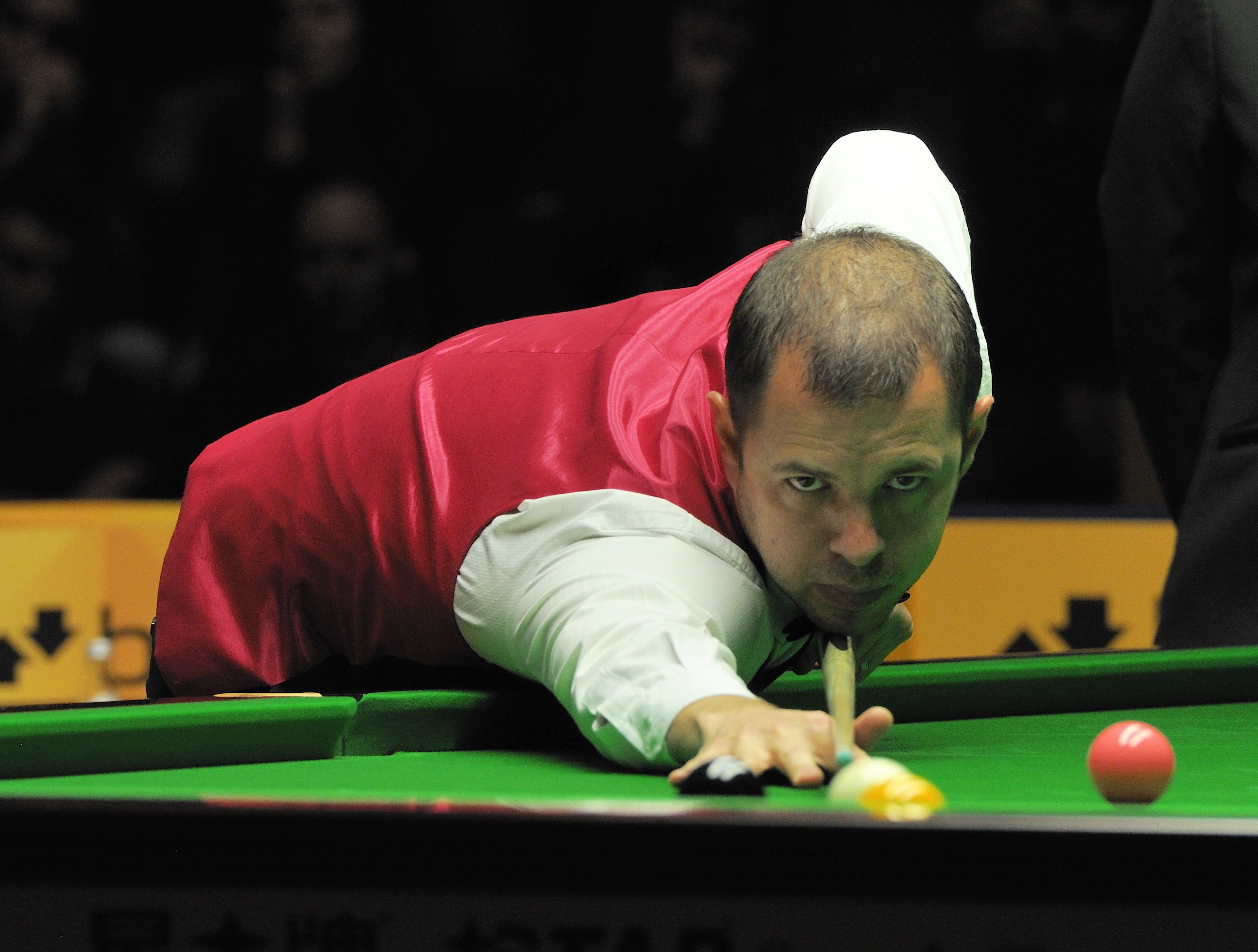
Barry Hawkins (pictured in 2013) reached his first German Masters final, defeating Yuan Sijun in the semi‑finals.

The semi‑finals were played on 1 February. Kyren Wilson won the first three frames against Xiao Guodong to lead 3‍–‍0, making a century break in the third, but Xiao won the fourth to reduce his deficit to 1‍–‍3 at the mid‑session interval. Wilson then won the next two frames to lead 5‍–‍1 before Xiao won the seventh. Wilson eventually won a 32‑minute eighth frame to defeat Xiao 6‍–‍2. Wilson praised the venue and the crowd after the match, saying "The crowd were spectacular. The roar is so different to any other venue."

Yuan Sijun made breaks of 82 and 70 to lead Barry Hawkins 2‍–‍0 but Hawkins then won the next two to level the score at 2‍–‍2. Close fifth and sixth frames were both won by Hawkins as well who then made back‑to‑back breaks of 83 in the seventh and eighth to defeat Yuan 6‍–‍2. Hawkins commented afterwards: "I think [Yuan Sijun] faltered towards the end a little bit. He started strongly and then when I came back at him it put him on the back foot."

==== Final ====
The final was played on 2 February as the best‑of‑19 frames, over two sessions. Kyren Wilson, the reigning World champion, was competing in his second German Masters final, having won the title previously in 2019. He met Barry Hawkins, the 13th seed, who was contesting his first German Masters final.

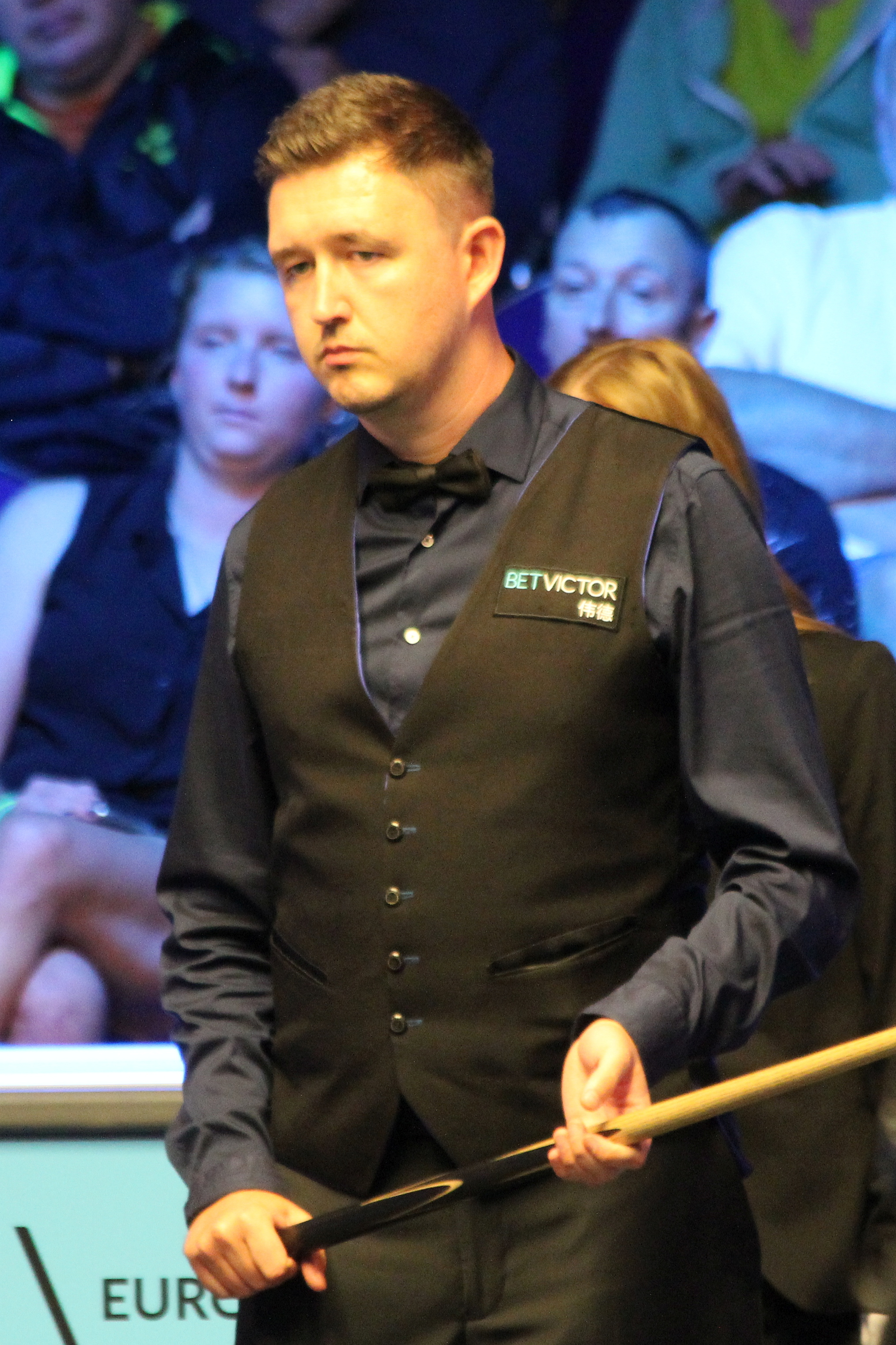
Kyren Wilson (pictured in 2022), the reigning World champion, won his second German Masters title, defeating Barry Hawkins 10‍–‍9 in the final.

In the opening session, Wilson won the first two frames, making breaks of 62 and 67, before Hawkins won the next two, including a low‑scoring fourth with a 54‍–‍26 advantage, to level the score at 2‍–‍2 at the first mid‑session interval. Wilson dominated the scoreline in the fifth frame but Hawkins responded with a 75 break to win the sixth and went on to also win the seventh to lead for the first time in the match at 4‍–‍3. Wilson then made a 128 century break in the eighth to level the score again at 4‍–‍4. In the ninth and last frame of the session, both players initially missed shots with the rest, giving their opponent a scoring opportunity, before Hawkins made a 102 break to win the frame and lead 5‍–‍4 at the interval.

At resumption of play, Wilson won the tenth frame of the match and then made a 93 break to also claim the eleventh and lead Hawkins 6‍–‍5. Wilson also had the first scoring opportunity in the twelfth, making a 53 break, but then overcut a pink and Hawkins cleared to the black to win the frame by two points and restore parity at 6‍–‍6. Both players then made their second century of the match, Wilson winning the thirteenth frame with a 125 and Hawkins the fourteenth with a 100 break, to tie the game at 7‍–‍7. Wilson subsequently won the fifteenth frame but Hawkins leveled again at 8‍–‍8, winning the sixteenth with a 61‑point clearance that included a table‑length double on the penultimate red, with Wilson saying he had "never seen such a good shot". After Hawkins missed an attempted plant, Wilson won the seventeenth frame to lead 9‍–‍8 but Hawkins claimed a 30‑minute eighteenth frame to set up a deciding frame at 9‍–‍9. It was the first time in the history of the German Masters that a deciding frame was played in the final. After Hawkins made a safety mistake by catching a red too thick and crashing the cue ball into the cluster of reds, Wilson gained the first scoring opportunity in the nineteenth and final frame, making a 59 break before missing a plant. Hawkins then attempted a thin cut on a red to a corner pocket and managed to pocket the object ball but went in‑off in a centre pocket. Now leading by 63 points with 5 reds remaining on the table, Wilson eventually made a plant to leave Hawkins requiring snookers and after a safety exchange potted the penultimate red from distance to win the frame and match 10‍–‍9.

After the match Wilson said: "It just shows how tough the standard is in snooker. Barry is one of the best match players in the game and you have to get past him. I managed to scrape through and I'm proud of how I held him off. The fans have been really treated to some great snooker this week and a 10‍–‍9 final is probably what they wished for. It is amazing to walk away with the trophy and I'd like to thank everyone for the support." Hawkins said: "I felt like I was holding on to Kyren all day. He was playing better than me and was the stronger player. In the end, at 9‍–‍9, it is anybody's game. I've had a great week. It has been a great crowd and I've had great support. It is onwards and upwards. Kyren deserved the win."

== Main draw ==
The results of the main draw are shown below. Numbers in parentheses after the players' names denote the top 32 seeded players. Players in bold denote match winners.

=== Top half ===
**Last 64**; Best of 9 frames
**Judd Trump (ENG) (1)**	**5**
David Grace (ENG)	2
Stephen Maguire (SCO) (32)	1
**Joe O'Connor (ENG)**	**5**
Chris Wakelin (ENG) (16)	2
**Hammad Miah (ENG)**	**5**
**Neil Robertson (AUS) (17)**	**5**
Antoni Kowalski (POL)	1
Hossein Vafaei (IRN) (24) (Note: Hossein Vafaei withdrew and so Yuan Sijun was given a walkover to the last 32.)	w/d
**Yuan Sijun (CHN)**	**w/o**
Ding Junhui (CHN) (9) (Note: Ding Junhui withdrew and so Ross Muir was given a walkover to the last 32.)	w/d
**Ross Muir (SCO)**	**w/o**
Stuart Bingham (ENG) (25)	0
**Thepchaiya Un-Nooh (THA)**	**5**
**Shaun Murphy (ENG) (8)**	**5**
Liam Graham (SCO)	0
**Mark Allen (NIR) (5)**	**5**
David Lilley (ENG)	0
**Wu Yize (CHN) (28)**	**5**
Jackson Page (WAL)	1
**Ali Carter (ENG) (12)**	**w/o**
He Guoqiang (CHN) (Note: He Guoqiang withdrew and so Ali Carter was given a walkover to the last 32.)	w/d
Jack Lisowski (ENG) (21)	3
**Alexander Ursenbacher (SUI)**	**5**
David Gilbert (ENG) (20)	0
**Ben Woollaston (ENG)**	**5**
**Barry Hawkins (ENG) (13)**	**5**
Alfie Burden (ENG)	4
Ryan Day (WAL) (29)	3
**Ricky Walden (ENG)**	**5**
Ronnie O'Sullivan (ENG) (4) (Note: Ronnie O'Sullivan withdrew and so Dylan Emery was given a walkover to the last 32.)	w/d
**Dylan Emery (WAL) (a)**	**w/o**

**Last 32**; Best of 9 frames
**(England) Judd Trump (1)**	**5**
(England) Joe O'Connor	0
(England) Hammad Miah	4
**(Australia) Neil Robertson (17)**	**5**
**(China) Yuan Sijun**	**5**
(Scotland) Ross Muir	2
(Thailand) Thepchaiya Un-Nooh	0
**(England) Shaun Murphy (8)**	**5**
(Northern Ireland) Mark Allen (5)	4
**(China) Wu Yize (28)**	**5**
(England) Ali Carter (12)	0
**(Switzerland) Alexander Ursenbacher**	**5**
(England) Ben Woollaston	3
**(England) Barry Hawkins (13)**	**5**
**(England) Ricky Walden**	**5**
(Wales) Dylan Emery (a)	3

**Last 16**; Best of 9 frames
(England) Judd Trump (1)	2
**(Australia) Neil Robertson (17)**	**5**
**(China) Yuan Sijun**	**5**
(England) Shaun Murphy (8)	4
**(China) Wu Yize (28)**	**5**
(Switzerland) Alexander Ursenbacher	2
**(England) Barry Hawkins (13)**	**w/o**
(England) Ricky Walden (Note: Ricky Walden withdrew for medical reasons after playing two matches and so Barry Hawkins was given a walkover to the quarter‑finals.)	w/d

**Quarter-finals**; Best of 9 frames
(Australia) Neil Robertson (17)	4
**(China) Yuan Sijun**	**5**
(China) Wu Yize (28)	3
**(England) Barry Hawkins (13)**	**5**

**Semi-finals**; Best of 11 frames
(China) Yuan Sijun	2
**(England) Barry Hawkins (13)**	**6**

Note: w/d=withdrawn; w/o=walkover

=== Bottom half ===
**Last 64**; Best of 9 frames
**Mark Selby (ENG) (3)**	**5**
Liu Hongyu (CHN)	2
**Elliot Slessor (ENG) (30)**	**5**
Lyu Haotian (CHN)	1
**Si Jiahui (CHN) (14)**	**5**
Ken Doherty (IRL)	0
**Xiao Guodong (CHN) (19)**	**5**
Fan Zhengyi (CHN)	3
**Tom Ford (ENG) (22)**	**w/o**
Dominic Dale (WAL) (Note: Dominic Dale withdrew and so Tom Ford was given a walkover to the last 32.)	w/d
Gary Wilson (ENG) (11)	4
**Daniel Wells (WAL)**	**5**
Noppon Saengkham (THA) (27)	4
**Jimmy Robertson (ENG)**	**5**
Mark Williams (WAL) (6)	2
**Aaron Hill (IRL)**	**5**
**Luca Brecel (BEL) (7)**	**5**
Jiang Jun (CHN)	2
Pang Junxu (CHN) (26)	4
**Anthony McGill (SCO)**	**5**
**Zhang Anda (CHN) (10)**	**5**
Graeme Dott (SCO)	4
**Robert Milkins (ENG) (23)**	**5**
Xu Si (CHN)	4
**Jak Jones (WAL) (18)**	**5**
Allan Taylor (ENG)	3
**John Higgins (SCO) (15)**	**5**
Mark Davis (ENG)	3
**Zhou Yuelong (CHN) (31)**	**5**
Artemijs Žižins (LAT)	2
**Kyren Wilson (ENG) (2)**	**5**
Cheung Ka Wai (HKG)	3

**Last 32**; Best of 9 frames
(England) Mark Selby (3)	4
**(England) Elliot Slessor (30)**	**5**
(China) Si Jiahui (14)	4
**(China) Xiao Guodong (19)**	**5**
**(England) Tom Ford (22)**	**5**
(Wales) Daniel Wells	2
(England) Jimmy Robertson	1
**(Republic of Ireland) Aaron Hill**	**5**
(Belgium) Luca Brecel (7)	2
**(Scotland) Anthony McGill**	**5**
**(China) Zhang Anda (10)**	**5**
(England) Robert Milkins (23)	2
**(Wales) Jak Jones (18)**	**5**
(Scotland) John Higgins (15)	3
(China) Zhou Yuelong (31)	3
**(England) Kyren Wilson (2)**	**5**

**Last 16**; Best of 9 frames
(England) Elliot Slessor (30)	1
**(China) Xiao Guodong (19)**	**5**
(England) Tom Ford (22)	3
**(Republic of Ireland) Aaron Hill**	**5**
**(Scotland) Anthony McGill**	**5**
(China) Zhang Anda (10)	2
(Wales) Jak Jones (18)	3
**(England) Kyren Wilson (2)**	**5**

**Quarter-finals**; Best of 9 frames
**(China) Xiao Guodong (19)**	**5**
(Republic of Ireland) Aaron Hill	0
(Scotland) Anthony McGill	4
**(England) Kyren Wilson (2)**	**5**

**Semi-finals**; Best of 11 frames
(China) Xiao Guodong (19)	2
**(England) Kyren Wilson (2)**	**6**

Note: w/d=withdrawn; w/o=walkover

=== Final ===
Final: Best of 19 frames. Referee: Maike Kesseler; Tempodrom, Berlin, Germany, 2 February 2025
Barry Hawkins (13); England	9–**10**	**Kyren Wilson** (2); England
Afternoon: 0–**80**, 12–**97**, **76**–30, **54**–26, 1–**81**, **91**–0, **63**–19, 0–**129** (128), **102**–0 (102); Evening: 0–**67**, 33–**93**, **60**–58, 7–**125** (125), **100**–26 (100), 45–**72**, **68**–23, 10–**74**, **77**–43, 16–**69**
(frame 9) 102	Highest break	**128** (frame 8)
2	Century breaks	2

== Qualifying rounds ==
The results of the qualifying rounds are shown below. Numbers in parentheses after the players' names denote the players' seeding, an "a" indicates amateur players who were not on the main World Snooker Tour, and players in bold denote match winners.

**Round 1 (Last 128)**; Best of 9 frames
**David Grace (ENG) (65)**	**5**
Anton Kazakov (UKR) (a)	0
Amir Sarkhosh (IRN) (96)	3
**Reanne Evans (ENG) (115)**	**5**
**Hammad Miah (ENG) (80)**	**5**
Chris Totten (SCO) (103)	3
Ian Burns (ENG) (81)	4
**Antoni Kowalski (POL) (98)**	**5**
Liam Pullen (ENG) (88)	4
**Bai Yulu (CHN) (109)**	**5**
**Ross Muir (SCO) (73)**	**5**
Robbie McGuigan (NIR) (105)	0
Andrew Pagett (WAL) (89) (Note: Andrew Pagett withdrew and so Paul Deaville was given a walkover.)	w/d
**Paul Deaville** (ENG) (a)	**w/o**
Ma Hailong (CHN) (72)	4
**Liam Graham (SCO) (97)**	**5**
Ishpreet Singh Chadha (IND) (69)	2
**Liam Davies (WAL) (101)**	**5**
**Sunny Akani (THA) (92)**	**5**
Hatem Yassen (EGY) (118)	3
**Rory Thor (MAS) (76)**	**5**
Haris Tahir (PAK) (106)	3
**Alexander Ursenbacher (SUI) (85)**	**5**
Jonas Luz (BRA) (116)	1
Andrew Higginson (ENG) (84)	4
**Wang Yuchen (HKG) (107)**	**5**
**Alfie Burden (ENG) (77)**	**5**
Mostafa Dorgham (EGY) (108)	3
**Dean Young (SCO) (93)**	**5**
Joshua Cooper (ENG) (a)	2
Louis Heathcote (ENG) (68)	2
**Dylan Emery (WAL) (a)**	**5**

**Round 2 (Last 96)**; Best of 9 frames
Long Zehuang (CHN) (64)	3
**David Grace (ENG) (65)**	**5**
**Joe O'Connor (ENG) (33)**	**5**
Reanne Evans (ENG) (115)	1
Matthew Stevens (WAL) (49)	2
**Hammad Miah (ENG) (80)**	**5**
Martin O'Donnell (ENG) (48)	0
**Antoni Kowalski (POL) (98)**	**5**
**Yuan Sijun (CHN) (41)**	**5**
Bai Yulu (CHN) (109)	1
Joe Perry (ENG) (56)	4
**Ross Muir (SCO) (73)**	**5**
**Thepchaiya Un-Nooh (THA) (40)**	**5**
Paul Deaville (ENG) (a)	3
Sanderson Lam (ENG) (57)	4
**Liam Graham (SCO) (97)**	**5**
**David Lilley (ENG) (60)**	**5**
Liam Davies (WAL) (101)	0
**Jackson Page (WAL) (37)**	**5**
Sunny Akani (THA) (92)	1
**He Guoqiang (CHN) (53)**	**5**
Rory Thor (MAS) (76)	4
Scott Donaldson (SCO) (44)	2
**Alexander Ursenbacher (SUI) (85)**	**5**
**Ben Woollaston (ENG) (45)**	**5**
Wang Yuchen (HKG) (107)	2
Jamie Jones (WAL) (52)	0
**Alfie Burden (ENG) (77)**	**5**
**Ricky Walden (ENG) (36)**	**5**
Dean Young (SCO) (93)	3
Jamie Clarke (WAL) (61)	4
**Dylan Emery (WAL) (a)**	**5**

**Round 1 (Last 128)**; Best of 9 frames
Ashley Carty (ENG) (67)	3
**Farakh Ajaib (PAK) (110)**	**5**
**Bulcsú Révész (HUN) (94)**	**5**
Baipat Siripaporn (THA) (120)	2
Oliver Lines (ENG) (78)	4
**Ken Doherty (IRL) (121)**	**5**
**Gong Chenzhi (CHN) (83)**	**5**
Mink Nutcharut (THA) (112)	3
**Zak Surety (ENG) (86)**	**5**
Simon Blackwell (ENG) (a)	1
**Stuart Carrington (ENG) (75)**	**5**
Manasawin Phetmalaikul (THA) (111)	0
Ben Mertens (BEL) (91)	4
**Joshua Thomond (ENG) (a)**	**5**
**Stan Moody (ENG) (70)**	**5**
Ahmed Aly Elsayed (USA) (119)	0
**Jiang Jun (CHN) (71)**	**5**
Huang Jiahao (CHN) (114)	1
Duane Jones (WAL) (90)	2
**Haydon Pinhey (ENG) (104)**	**5**
**Xing Zihao (CHN) (74)**	**5**
Mitchell Mann (ENG) (113)	1
Jimmy White (ENG) (87)	2
**Julien Leclercq (BEL) (100)**	**5**
Lei Peifan (CHN) (82)	3
**Allan Taylor (ENG) (102)**	**5**
Michael Holt (ENG) (79)	2
**Iulian Boiko (UKR) (a)**	**5**
**Artemijs Žižins (LAT) (95)**	**5**
Kreishh Gurbaxani (IND) (117)	4
Marco Fu (HKG) (66)	3
**Cheung Ka Wai (HKG) (99)**	**5**

**Round 2 (Last 96)**; Best of 9 frames
**Liu Hongyu (CHN) (62)**	**5**
Farakh Ajaib (PAK) (110)	3
**Lyu Haotian (CHN) (35)**	**5**
Bulcsú Révész (HUN) (94)	3
Jordan Brown (NIR) (51)	4
**Ken Doherty (IRL) (121)**	**5**
**Fan Zhengyi (CHN) (46)**	**5**
Gong Chenzhi (CHN) (83)	3
**Dominic Dale (WAL) (43)**	**5**
Zak Surety (ENG) (86)	3
**Daniel Wells (WAL) (54)**	**5**
Stuart Carrington (ENG) (75)	3
**Jimmy Robertson (ENG) (38)**	**5**
Joshua Thomond (ENG) (a)	2
**Aaron Hill (IRL) (59)**	**5**
Stan Moody (ENG) (70)	4
Tian Pengfei (CHN) (58)	2
**Jiang Jun (CHN) (71)**	**5**
**Anthony McGill (SCO) (39)**	**5**
Haydon Pinhey (ENG) (104)	0
**Graeme Dott (SCO) (55)**	**5**
Xing Zihao (CHN) (74)	0
**Xu Si (CHN) (42)**	**5**
Julien Leclercq (BEL) (100)	1
Robbie Williams (ENG) (47)	2
**Allan Taylor (ENG) (102)**	**5**
**Mark Davis (ENG) (50)**	**5**
Iulian Boiko (UKR) (a)	1
Matthew Selt (ENG) (34)	4
**Artemijs Žižins (LAT) (95)**	**5**
Anthony Hamilton (ENG) (63)	2
**Cheung Ka Wai (HKG) (99)**	**5**

Note: w/d=withdrawn; w/o=walkover

== Century breaks ==
=== Main stage centuries ===
A total of 70 century breaks were made during the main stage of the tournament in Berlin.

- 145, 123 – Si Jiahui
- 139, 100 – Tom Ford
- 138, 138, 102, 102, 100, 100 – Barry Hawkins
- 138, 133, 126, 120, 107, 105 – Wu Yize
- 134, 123, 114, 107, 106, 104 – Anthony McGill
- 131, 131, 125, 113, 102, 100 – Neil Robertson
- 131, 128, 125, 112, 103, 100, 100, 100 – Kyren Wilson
- 130, 112 – Zhou Yuelong
- 127, 120, 102, 102, 100 – Yuan Sijun
- 126, 116, 100 – Zhang Anda
- 126, 104 – Joe O'Connor
- 124 – John Higgins
- 123, 106 – Jak Jones
- 122, 100 – Judd Trump
- 121 – Jack Lisowski
- 120 – Ben Woollaston
- 115 – Fan Zhengyi
- 115 – Aaron Hill
- 114, 113, 106, 102, 100 – Xiao Guodong
- 113 – Noppon Saengkham
- 108, 106, 100 – Shaun Murphy
- 107 – Cheung Ka Wai
- 104 – Luca Brecel
- 103 – Pang Junxu
- 100 – Jackson Page

=== Qualifying stage centuries ===
A total of 31 century breaks were made during the qualifying stage of the tournament in Sheffield.

- 144 – Fan Zhengyi
- 143 – Matthew Selt
- 142 – Xu Si
- 135, 101 – Allan Taylor
- 134 – Long Zehuang
- 133, 118, 114 – Jiang Jun
- 133, 116, 108 – Stan Moody
- 131, 113 – Haydon Pinhey
- 131 – Julien Leclercq
- 128 – Bai Yulu
- 122 – Dylan Emery
- 119 – Mostafa Dorgham
- 110, 102 – Hammad Miah
- 110 – Ben Mertens
- 104, 101 – Thepchaiya Un-Nooh
- 103 – Chris Totten
- 102 – Joe Perry
- 102 – Rory Thor
- 101 – Jamie Clarke
- 101 – Gong Chenzhi
- 101 – Ricky Walden
- 100 – Graeme Dott
- 100 – Liu Hongyu
