= Liam Graham (snooker player) =

Scottish professional snooker player (born 2004)

Personal information
- Born: 12 September 2004 (age 22)

Sport
- Country: Scotland
- Sport: Snooker
- Professional: 2023–present
- Highest ranking: 85 (December 2024)
- Current ranking: 90 (as of 26 October 2026)
- Best ranking finish: Runner-up (2024 Shoot Out)

Liam Graham (born 12 September 2004) is a Scottish professional snooker player. He won the EBSA European Under-21 Snooker Championship in March 2023. He was also runner-up in the 2024 Shoot Out.

== Early life ==
Graham first played snooker with his grandfather in Cathcart, Glasgow. He also practised as a youngster with Scottish professional Alan McManus. He also practises with Fraser Patrick, Joel Connolly, Jordan Brown, and Mark Allen.

== Career ==
As the top Scottish ranked under-21 amateur player he received a wildcard into the Scottish Open in December 2022 where he played Michael Holt, losing narrowly 4-3.

Graham won the 2023 EBSA European Under-21 Snooker Championships, held in Malta. He beat Ukrainian Iulian Boiko 5–2 in the final. With that win he was awarded a two-year tour card for the World Snooker Tour, starting from the 2023-24 snooker season.

=== 2023–2024 season ===
Graham made his debut in a professional draw at the 2023 Championship League held at the Morningside Arena in Leicester, England from 26 June 2023. In the round-Robin group stage he started with defeats to top-50 ranked Ben Woollaston and Jimmy Robertson but earned a 2-2 draw with the experienced Peter Lines. He earned his first professional win on 17 August 2023, at the British Open qualifying in Leicester, with a 4-3 win over Cao Yupeng.

Graham was due to face Ronnie O’Sullivan at the Scottish Open, but his opponent pulled out on the morning of the event. Graham, who had many friends and family at the event to watch the match said he found O'Sullivan’s actions "disrespectful".

=== 2024–2025 season ===
He defeated Baipat Siripaporn at the 2024 Northern Ireland Open in September 2024, before losing to Yuan Sijun in the next round.

In December 2024, he reached the final of the 2024 Snooker Shoot Out with a wins over He Guoqiang, Ali Carter, Noppon Saengkham, Martin O'Donnell and Mark Selby. That month, he qualified for the 2025 German Masters with wins over Ma Hailong and Sanderson Lam. In the last-64 he was whitewashed by an in-form Shaun Murphy. He lost to Ross Muir in qualifying for the 2025 World Championship.

=== 2025–2026 season ===
He recorded a 4-0 win over Chris Totten in September 2025 at the 2025 Northern Ireland Open. In April, he recorded a 10-4 loss over Oliver Sykes in the first round of qualifying for the 2026 World Snooker Championship.

== Performance and rankings timeline ==
| Tournament | 2018/ 19 | 2021/ 22 | 2022/ 23 | 2023/ 24 | 2024/ 25 | 2025/ 26 | 2026/ 27 |
|---|---|---|---|---|---|---|---|
| Ranking (Note: It shows the ranking at the beginning of the season) | (Note: He was an amateur) | | | (Note: New players on the Main Tour don't have a ranking) | 89 | (Note: Players qualified One Year Ranking List started the season without ranking points) | 87 |
Ranking tournaments
| Championship League | NH | A | A | RR | RR | RR | RR |
| China Open | A | Tournament Not Held | | | | | LQ |
| Wuhan Open | Not Held | | | LQ | LQ | LQ | LQ |
| British Open | NH | A | A | 1R | 1R | LQ | 1R |
| English Open | A | A | A | LQ | LQ | LQ | LQ |
| Shenzhen Open (Note: The event was called the Xi'an Grand Prix (2024/2025–2025/2026)) | Tournament Not Held | | | | LQ | LQ | LQ |
| Northern Ireland Open | A | A | A | LQ | LQ | LQ | LQ |
| International Championship | A | Not Held | | LQ | LQ | LQ | |
| UK Championship | A | A | LQ | LQ | LQ | LQ | |
| Shoot Out | 1R | 1R | 1R | 1R | F | 2R | |
| Scottish Open | A | LQ | LQ | 2R | LQ | LQ | LQ |
| German Masters | A | A | A | LQ | 1R | LQ | |
| Welsh Open | A | A | A | LQ | LQ | LQ | |
| World Grand Prix | DNQ | DNQ | DNQ | DNQ | DNQ | DNQ | |
| Players Championship | DNQ | DNQ | DNQ | DNQ | DNQ | DNQ | |
| World Open | A | Not Held | | LQ | LQ | LQ | |
| Tour Championship | DNQ | DNQ | DNQ | DNQ | DNQ | DNQ | |
| World Championship | A | A | LQ | LQ | LQ | LQ | |
Former ranking tournaments
| European Masters | A | A | A | LQ | Not Held | | |
| Saudi Arabia Masters | Tournament Not Held | | | | 2R | 2R | NH |

Performance Table Legend
| LQ | lost in the qualifying draw | #R | lost in the early rounds of the tournament (WR = Wildcard round, RR = Round robin) | QF | lost in the quarter-finals |
| SF | lost in the semi-finals | F | lost in the final | W | won the tournament |
| DNQ | did not qualify for the tournament | A | did not participate in the tournament | WD | withdrew from the tournament |

| NH / Not Held | means an event was not held. |
| NR / Non-Ranking Event | means an event is/was no longer a ranking event. |
| R / Ranking Event | means an event is/was a ranking event. |
| MR / Minor-Ranking Event | means an event is/was a minor-ranking event. |

== Career finals ==
=== Ranking finals: 1 ===
| Outcome | No. | Year | Championship | Opponent in the final | Score |
|---|---|---|---|---|---|
| Runner-up | 1. | 2024 | Snooker Shoot Out | (England) Tom Ford | 0–1 |

=== Amateur finals: 4 (3 titles) ===
| Outcome | No. | Year | Championship | Opponent in the final | Score |
|---|---|---|---|---|---|
| Winner | 1. | 2021 | Scottish Under-21 Championship | (Scotland) Aaron Graham | 4–2 |
| Winner | 2. | 2022 | Scottish Under-21 Championship (2) | (Scotland) Amaan Iqbal | 5–1 |
| Runner-up | 1. | 2022 | Scottish Amateur Championship | (Scotland) Michael Collumb | 3–7 |
| Winner | 3. | 2023 | EBSA European Under-21 Championship | (Ukraine) Iulian Boiko | 5–2 |
