= 2024 Snooker Shoot Out =

Snooker tournament

2024 9Club Snooker Shoot Out

Tournament information
- Dates: 4–7 December 2024
- Venue: Mattioli Arena
- City: Leicester
- Country: England
- Organisation: World Snooker Tour
- Format: Ranking event
- Total prize fund: £171,000
- Winner's share: £50,000
- Highest break: Zhou Yuelong (CHN) (101)

Final
- Champion: Tom Ford (ENG)
- Runner-up: Liam Graham (SCO)
- Score: 31–28 (one frame)

The 2024 Snooker Shoot Out (officially the 2024 9Club Snooker Shoot Out) was a professional snooker tournament that took place from 4 to 7 December 2024 at the Mattioli Arena in Leicester, England. The tenth ranking event of the 2024‍–‍25 season, it was played under a variation of the standard rules of snooker, with every match contested over a single frame. The event was broadcast by Eurosport and Discovery+ in Europe and other broadcasters worldwide.

Mark Allen was the defending champion, having defeated Cao Yupeng 65‍–‍4 in the previous final, becoming the first player in the history of the event to win the title while ranked within the world's top 16. Allen was defeated by Si Jiahui in the second round.

Tom Ford won the tournament, defeating Liam Graham 31‍–‍28 in the final and capturing his maiden ranking title. Zhou Yuelong made the highest break of the tournament, a 101, which was also the only century break of the event.

== Format ==
The tournament was the sixteenth edition of the Snooker Shoot Out, first held as a non‑ranking event in 1990 before being revived in 2011 and since then having been held annually. It was promoted to a ranking event starting with the 2017 edition. It was the tenth ranking event of the 2024‍–‍25 season following the 2024 UK Championship and preceding the 2024 Scottish Open. The event was held at the Mattioli Arena in Leicester, England, from 4‍–‍7 December 2024.

The tournament was played using a variation of the traditional snooker rules. The draw was randomised before each round. All matches were played over a single frame, each of which lasted up to 10 minutes. The event featured a variable shot clock; shots played in the first five minutes were allowed 15 seconds while the final five minutes had a 10‑second timer. The player who had the most points after the time ran out or after all balls had been pocketed (or after a foul on the final black), won the match. All foul shots awarded the opponent a ball in hand. Unlike traditional snooker, if a ball did not either hit a cushion or enter a pocket on every shot, it was a foul. Rather than a coin toss, a lag was used to choose which player breaks. In the event of a draw, each player received a shot at the blue ball. This is known as a "blue ball shootout". The player who potted the ball with the cue ball from inside the "D" and the blue ball on its spot with the opponent missing won the match.

=== Amateur nominations ===
The World Professional Billiards and Snooker Association nominated the following eight amateur players to participate alongside the professionals:

- Vladislav Gradinari, reigning European Billiards and Snooker Association (EBSA) Under-16 Champion and Under-18 Finalist
- Riley Powell, EBSA Under-16 Finalist
- Sophie Nix, ranked first in the World Women's Snooker Under-21 list
- Joel Connolly, Irish Under-21 Champion
- Sion Stuart, Welsh Under-16 Champion
- Daniel Boyes, English Under-18 Champion
- Steven Wardropper, Scottish Under-16 Champion
- Joe Shannon, Irish Under-16 Champion

=== Broadcasters ===
The event was broadcast by Eurosport and Discovery+ in Europe (including the United Kingdom and Ireland); by the CBSA‑WPBSA Academy WeChat Channel, the CBSA‑WPBSA Academy Douyin and Huya Live in China; by Now TV in Hong Kong; by Astro SuperSport in Malaysia and Brunei; by True Sport in Thailand; by TAP in the Philippines; and by Sportcast in Taiwan. It was available from Matchroom Sport in all other territories.

=== Prize fund ===
The total prize fund for the event was £171,000 with the winner receiving £50,000. The breakdown of prize money is shown below:

- Winner: £50,000
- Runner-up: £20,000
- Semi-final: £8,000
- Quarter-final: £4,000
- Last 16: £2,000
- Last 32: £1,000
- Last 64: £500
- Last 128: £250
- Highest break: £5,000
- Total: £171,000

== Tournament draw ==
All times in Greenwich Mean Time. Times for quarter‑finals, semi‑finals and final are approximate. Players in bold denote match winners.

Before the start of the tournament Ricky Walden, Barry Hawkins, and Ken Doherty withdrew. They were replaced by Gerard Greene, Sean O'Sullivan, and Kayden Brierley respectively.

=== Round 1 ===
Match results as follows:

==== 4 December – 13:00 ====
- Ross Muir (SCO) 0–**68** **Mark Allen** (NIR)
- **Hossein Vafaei** (IRN) **46**–34 Julien Leclercq (BEL)
- Jiang Jun (CHN) 7–**58** **Antoni Kowalski** (POL)
- **Lyu Haotian** (CHN) **65**–28 Tian Pengfei (CHN)
- **Robert Milkins** (ENG) **45**–42 Joe Shannon (IRL)
- **Louis Heathcote** (ENG) **65**–31 Ahmed Aly Elsayed (USA)
- Jonas Luz (BRA) 20–**23** **Paul Deaville** (ENG)
- **David Gilbert** (ENG) **74**–1 David Grace (ENG) (Note: David Gilbert made a break of 70 in round 1.)
- Matthew Selt (ENG) 33–**46** **Ryan Day** (WAL)
- Dean Young (SCO) 1–**51** **Florian Nüßle** (AUT)
- **Fan Zhengyi** (CHN) **66**–14 Wang Yuchen (HKG)
- **Anthony McGill** (SCO) **40**–7 Sophie Nix (SCO)
- **Aaron Hill** (IRL) **39**–12 Joel Connolly (NIR)
- Reanne Evans (ENG) 8–**79** **Gary Wilson** (ENG)
- Daniel Boyes (ENG) 13–**80** **Wu Yize** (CHN)
- Joe Perry (ENG) 8–**33** **Gong Chenzhi** (CHN)

==== 4 December – 19:00 ====
- **Thepchaiya Un-Nooh** (THA) **75**–30 Jimmy White (ENG)
- **Zhou Yuelong** (CHN) **57**–49 Andrew Pagett (WAL)
- Pang Junxu (CHN) 33–**65** **Zak Surety** (ENG)
- Haris Tahir (PAK) 16–**40** **David Lilley** (ENG)
- Jordan Brown (NIR) 0–**97** **Si Jiahui** (CHN) (Note: Si Jiahui made a break of 78 in round 1.)
- Cheung Ka Wai (HKG) 14–**72** **Andrew Higginson** (ENG)
- **Huang Jiahao** (CHN) **74**–15 Hammad Miah (ENG)
- **Xiao Guodong** (CHN) **23**–11 Anthony Hamilton (ENG)
- **Matthew Stevens** (WAL) **24**–18 Yuan Sijun (CHN)
- Daniel Womersley (ENG) 1–**42** **Long Zehuang** (CHN)
- Chris Totten (SCO) 33–**36** **Duane Jones** (WAL)
- Ian Burns (ENG) 28–**60** **Ma Hailong** (CHN)
- **Joe O'Connor** (ENG) **46**–44 Sanderson Lam (ENG)
- **Haydon Pinhey** (ENG) **34**–3 Mitchell Mann (ENG)
- **Noppon Saengkham** (THA) **30**–17 Liu Hongyu (CHN)
- **Ashley Carty** (ENG) **43**–13 Kayden Brierley (ENG) (Note: Kayden Brierley replaced Ken Doherty who withdrew.)

==== 5 December – 13:00 ====
- **Mark Selby** (ENG) **85**–17 Baipat Siripaporn (THA)
- Stan Moody (ENG) 11–**14** **Riley Powell** (WAL)
- **Lewis Ullah** (ENG) **18**–7 Steven Wardropper (SCO)
- **Jackson Page** (WAL) **37**–3 Manasawin Phetmalaikul (THA)
- Mink Nutcharut (THA) 13–**24** **Liam Graham** (SCO)
- **Zhang Anda** (CHN) **101**–0 Hatem Yassen (EGY) (Note: Zhang Anda made a break of 89 in round 1.)
- Sion Stuart (WAL) 12–**27** **Martin O'Donnell** (ENG)
- **Alfie Burden** (ENG) **71**–26 Ben Woollaston (ENG)
- **Graeme Dott** (SCO) **56**–40 Ben Mertens (BEL)
- **Bai Yulu** (CHN) **47**–36 Jamie Clarke (WAL)
- **Vladislav Gradinari** (MDA) **52**–2 Daniel Wells (WAL)
- **Tom Ford** (ENG) **69**–31 Xing Zihao (CHN)
- **Robbie Williams** (ENG) **44**–30 Michael Holt (ENG)
- **Bulcsú Révész** (HUN) **35**–23 Farakh Ajaib (PAK)
- Jimmy Robertson (ENG) 13–**21** **Liam Pullen** (ENG)
- **Shaun Murphy** (ENG) **69**–13 Sean O'Sullivan (ENG) (Note: Sean O'Sullivan replaced Barry Hawkins who withdrew.)

==== 5 December – 19:00 ====
- **Neil Robertson** (AUS) **73**–14 Simon Blackwell (ENG)
- Oliver Lines (ENG) 33–**50** **Allan Taylor** (ENG)
- Stuart Carrington (ENG) 13–**62** **Dylan Emery** (WAL)
- Mark Davis (ENG) 11–**39** **Liam Davies** (WAL)
- **Iulian Boiko** (UKR) **80**–5 Jack Lisowski (ENG)
- **Ishpreet Singh Chadha** (IND) **59**–7 Amir Sarkhosh (IRN)
- **Mark Joyce** (ENG) **50**–17 Joshua Thomond (ENG)
- Robbie McGuigan (NIR) 24–**66** **Gerard Greene** (NIR) (Note: Gerard Greene replaced Ricky Walden who withdrew.)
- **He Guoqiang** (CHN) **52**–29 Stuart Bingham (ENG)
- **Jamie Jones** (WAL) **84**–1 Rory Thor (MAS) (Note: Jamie Jones made a break of 84 in round 1.)
- Anton Kazakov (UKR) 21–**33** **Artemijs Žižins** (LAT)
- **Kreishh Gurbaxani** (IND) **53**–51 Lei Peifan (CHN)
- Mostafa Dorgham (EGY) 1–**7** **Elliot Slessor** (ENG) (Note: In the round 1 match between Elliot Slessor and Mostafa Dorgham, the 7‍–‍1 score was the lowest scoring match in the history of the tournament.)
- Alexander Ursenbacher (SUI) 53–**74** **Xu Si** (CHN)
- Joshua Cooper (ENG) 22–**66** **Jak Jones** (WAL)
- **Ali Carter** (ENG) **17**–2 Chris Wakelin (ENG)

=== Round 2 ===
Match results as follows:

==== 6 December – 13:00 ====
- Graeme Dott (SCO) 7–**71** **Robert Milkins** (ENG) (Note: Robert Milkins made a break of 71 in round 2.)
- Iulian Boiko (UKR) 17–**39** **Florian Nüßle** (AUT)
- Bulcsú Révész (HUN) 45–**73** **Fan Zhengyi** (CHN)
- Artemijs Žižins (LAT) 13–**26** **Ashley Carty** (ENG)
- **Zhang Anda** (CHN) **65**–12 Bai Yulu (CHN)
- **Antoni Kowalski** (POL) **50**–12 Riley Powell (WAL)
- Gong Chenzhi (CHN) 15–**45** **Huang Jiahao** (CHN)
- Hossein Vafaei (IRN) 55–**57** **Andrew Higginson** (ENG)
- **Wu Yize** (CHN) **52**–51 Matthew Stevens (WAL)
- Ryan Day (WAL) 19–**55** **Dylan Emery** (WAL)
- David Lilley (ENG) 13–**14** **Noppon Saengkham** (THA)
- Anthony McGill (SCO) 1–**69** **Duane Jones** (WAL)
- He Guoqiang (CHN) 13–**57** **Liam Graham** (SCO)
- Ishpreet Singh Chadha (IND) 16–**64** **Jamie Jones** (WAL)
- **Neil Robertson** (AUS) **59**–49 Jackson Page (WAL)
- Mark Allen (NIR) 8–**36** **Si Jiahui** (CHN)

==== 6 December – 19:00 ====
- Shaun Murphy (ENG) 0–**73** **David Gilbert** (ENG) (Note: David Gilbert made a break of 73 in round 2.)
- Thepchaiya Un-Nooh (THA) 0–**63** **Aaron Hill** (IRL)
- **Liam Pullen** (ENG) **48**–37 Zak Surety (ENG)
- Gary Wilson (ENG) 28–**50** **Liam Davies** (WAL)
- **Elliot Slessor** (ENG) **60**–21 Mark Joyce (ENG)
- Alfie Burden (ENG) 23–**39** **Robbie Williams** (ENG)
- **Kreishh Gurbaxani** (IND) **47**–30 Xu Si (CHN)
- Xiao Guodong (CHN) 17–**83** **Martin O'Donnell** (ENG) (Note: Martin O'Donnell made a break of 83 in round 2.)
- Joe O'Connor (ENG) 41–**58** **Allan Taylor** (ENG)
- Long Zehuang (CHN) 15–**18** **Vladislav Gradinari** (MDA)
- **Haydon Pinhey** (ENG) **62**–21 Gerard Greene (NIR)
- **Tom Ford** (ENG) **72**–10 Paul Deaville (ENG)
- **Ma Hailong** (CHN) **57**–46 Lewis Ullah (ENG)
- **Zhou Yuelong** (CHN) **115**–0 Louis Heathcote (ENG) (Note: Zhou Yuelong made a century break of 101 in round 2.)
- **Ali Carter** (ENG) **50**–19 Lyu Haotian (CHN)
- **Mark Selby** (ENG) **73**–8 Jak Jones (WAL)

=== Round 3 ===
Match results as follows:

==== 7 December – 13:00 ====
- Neil Robertson (AUS) 2–**48** **Liam Pullen** (ENG)
- Dylan Emery (WAL) 8–**50** **Noppon Saengkham** (THA)
- Zhou Yuelong (CHN) 38–**39** **Florian Nüßle** (AUT)
- Duane Jones (WAL) 21–**39** **Tom Ford** (ENG)
- **Antoni Kowalski** (POL) **85**–9 Vladislav Gradinari (MDA)
- **Andrew Higginson** (ENG) **49**–16 Ma Hailong (CHN)
- **Wu Yize** (CHN) **42**–26 Liam Davies (WAL)
- Zhang Anda (CHN) 20–**36** **Elliot Slessor** (ENG)
- **Mark Selby** (ENG) **26**–7 Jamie Jones (WAL)
- **Liam Graham** (SCO) **43**–37 Ali Carter (ENG)
- Aaron Hill (IRL) 37–**42** **Allan Taylor** (ENG)
- Si Jiahui (CHN) 7–**51** **Martin O'Donnell** (ENG)
- **Kreishh Gurbaxani** (IND) **30**–10 Ashley Carty (ENG)
- **Robbie Williams** (ENG) **49**–42 Fan Zhengyi (CHN)
- **Huang Jiahao** (CHN) **81**–0 David Gilbert (ENG) (Note: Huang Jiahao made a break of 73 in round 3.)
- **Robert Milkins** (ENG) **56**–21 Haydon Pinhey (ENG)

=== Round 4 ===
Match results as follows:

==== 7 December – 19:00 ====
- **Mark Selby** (ENG) **80**–0 Liam Pullen (ENG)
- Antoni Kowalski (POL) 18–**30** **Florian Nüßle** (AUT)
- Allan Taylor (ENG) 3–**42** **Andrew Higginson** (ENG)
- Elliot Slessor (ENG) 43–**46** **Wu Yize** (CHN)
- Robert Milkins (ENG) 31–**56** **Martin O'Donnell** (ENG)
- Robbie Williams (ENG) 11–**50** **Huang Jiahao** (CHN)
- Kreishh Gurbaxani (IND) 26–**55** **Tom Ford** (ENG)
- Noppon Saengkham (THA) 7–**59** **Liam Graham** (SCO)

=== Quarter-finals ===
Match results as follows:

==== 7 December – 21:00 ====
- **Mark Selby** (ENG) **104**–1 Florian Nüßle (AUT) (Note: Mark Selby made a break of 90 in the quarter‑finals.)
- **Wu Yize** (CHN) **71**–6 Andrew Higginson (ENG) (Note: Wu Yize made a break of 71 in the quarter‑finals.)
- Martin O'Donnell (ENG) 13–**19** **Liam Graham** (SCO)
- **Tom Ford** (ENG) **64**–23 Huang Jiahao (CHN)

=== Semi-finals ===
Match results as follows:

==== 7 December – 22:00 ====
- **Liam Graham** (SCO) **38**–20 Mark Selby (ENG)
- **Tom Ford** (ENG) **37**–32 Wu Yize (CHN) (Note: Tom Ford beat Wu Yize in a sudden death blue ball shoot‑out in the semi‑finals, after the match frame finished level at 32‍–‍32. Ford potted his first blue but Wu missed his first.)

=== Final ===
Final: 1 frame. Referee: Ben Williams; Mattioli Arena, Leicester, England, 7 December 2024 – 22:30
Liam Graham; Scotland	28–**31**	**Tom Ford**; England

== High breaks ==
Only one century break was made during the tournament.

- 101 – Zhou Yuelong
