= Gong Chenzhi =

Chinese snooker player

Personal information
- Born: 22 September 2006 (age 20)

Sport
- Country: China
- Sport: Snooker
- Professional: 2024–present
- Highest ranking: 67 (July 2025)
- Current ranking: 94 (as of 26 October 2026)
- Best ranking finish: Last 16 (x2)

Gong Chenzhi (Chinese: 巩晨智, born 22 September 2006) is a Chinese snooker player. In 2024, he won a place on the World Snooker Tour from the 2024–25 snooker season.

== Career ==
In June 2023, Gong beat three-time Women’s World Champion Ng On Yee 4-0 at the Asia-Oceania Q School in Bangkok.

=== 2023/24 ===
He reached the semi-finals at the 2023 CBSA Zhang Jiagang Youth Event Under-21 tournament. He was awarded a wildcard for the 2023 Wuhan Open. At the event he defeated Daniel Womersley and Jordan Brown. He was then beaten 4-5 by compatriot He Guoquiang. At the 2023 Shanghai Masters in September 2023, he played Iranian top-16 player Hossein Vafaei and lost 6-1.

Awarded a wildcard into the 2023 International Championship in Tianjin in November 2023, he was defeated by compatriot Wang Xingzhong 5-6, who at 12 years-old, became the second youngest player to ever compete at a ranking event, after Liam Davies at the 2019 Snooker Shoot Out.

At the WSF Junior Snooker Championship held in Albania in February 2024, he reached the final before being defeated by Hungarian Bulcsú Révész.

In qualifying for the 2024 World Snooker Championship he was defeated by veteran Rod Lawler 10-7.

=== 2024/25 ===
Through his performances on the CBSA China Tour he earnt a place on the World Snooker Tour from the 2024–25 snooker season. He made his professional debut at the 2024 Championship League in Leicester in June 2024. He defeated Gerard Greene in the third match of his round robin group. At the 2024 Xi'an Grand Prix he defeated Tom Ford before facing countryman Si Jiahui. He reached the fourth round of the 2024 Saudi Arabia Snooker Masters before facing Neil Robertson. He recorded a win over Mink Nutcharut in qualifying for the 2025 German Masters. He lost to David Gilbert in the third round of qualifying for the 2025 World Snooker Championship.

=== 2025/26 ===
He was drawn in the round-robin stage of the 2025 Championship League against Jack Lisowski, Ross Muir and Ashley Carty, and went unbeaten, beating Carty and earning 2-2 draws with Muir and Lisowski. He suffered a 5-0 defeat to Mark Selby at the 2025 Xi'an Grand Prix. He reached the second round of qualifying at the 2026 World Snooker Championship before losing to Robbie McGuigan. Dropping off the tour at the conclusion of the season, he entered European Q School in May 2026, reaching the final round of event two with a win over Robert Milkins, where he faced France's Brian Ochoiski and won 4–2 to regain his tour card.

=== 2026/27 ===
In September 2026, he reached the last-16 of the 2026 English Open before his run was ended by Ali Carter.

== Performance and rankings timeline ==
Tournament	2023/ 24	2024/ 25	2025/ 26	2026/ 27
Ranking (Note: It shows the ranking at the beginning of the season)	(Note: He was an amateur)	(Note: New players on the Main Tour do not have a ranking)	68	(Note: Players qualified through the Q School started the season without ranking points)
Ranking tournaments
Championship League	A	RR	RR	RR
China Open	Not Held			LQ
Wuhan Open	2R	LQ	LQ	LQ
British Open	A	1R	LQ	1R
English Open	A	LQ	1R	3R
Shenzhen Open (Note: The event was called the Xi'an Grand Prix (2024/2025–2025/2026))	NH	3R	LQ	LQ
Northern Ireland Open	A	LQ	LQ	LQ
International Championship	LQ	1R	LQ	
UK Championship	A	LQ	LQ	
Shoot Out	A	2R	1R	
Scottish Open	A	LQ	LQ	
German Masters	A	LQ	LQ	
Welsh Open	A	LQ	LQ	
World Grand Prix	DNQ	DNQ	DNQ	
Players Championship	DNQ	DNQ	DNQ	
World Open	LQ	LQ	LQ	
Tour Championship	DNQ	DNQ	DNQ	
World Championship	LQ	LQ	LQ	
Non-ranking tournaments
Shanghai Masters	1R	A	A	
Former ranking tournaments
Saudi Arabia Masters	NH	4R	3R	NH

Performance Table Legend
LQ	lost in the qualifying draw	#R	lost in the early rounds of the tournament (WR = Wildcard round, RR = Round robin)	QF	lost in the quarter-finals
SF	lost in the semi-finals	F	lost in the final	W	won the tournament
DNQ	did not qualify for the tournament	A	did not participate in the tournament	WD	withdrew from the tournament

NH / Not Held	means an event was not held
NR / Non-Ranking Event	means an event is/was no longer a ranking event
R / Ranking Event	means an event is/was a ranking event
MR / Minor-Ranking Event	means an event is/was a minor-ranking event
