= Kreishh Gurbaxani =

Indian snooker player

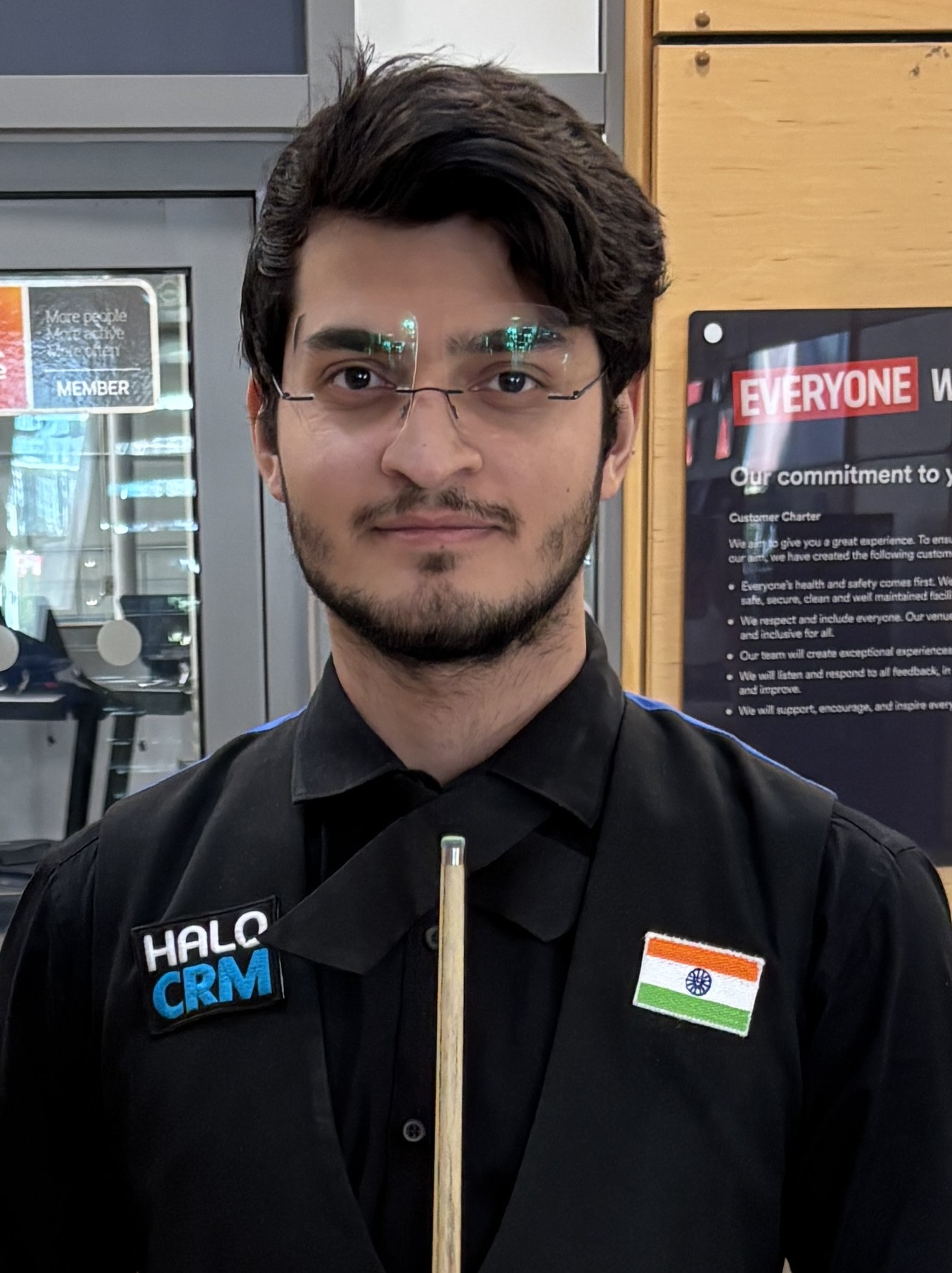

Personal information
- Born: 23 August 2002 (age 24) Mumbai, India

Sport
- Country: India
- Sport: Snooker
- Professional: 2024–present
- Highest ranking: 91 (July 2025)
- Best ranking finish: Last 16 (2024 Shoot Out)

Kreishh Gurbaxani (born 23 August 2002) is an Indian snooker player from Mumbai. He earned a two-year card on the World Snooker Tour starting from the 2024–25 snooker season.

== Career ==
From Mumbai, he began playing snooker at a young age and was junior snooker champion in his home state of Maharashtra in 2018, at the age of 15 years-old. By 2013 he had begun to be trained by two-time Asian champion Yasin Merchant at the Khar Gymnasium, also the base of fellow professional Ishpreet Singh Chadha, with the pair being described as “prodigies" of Merchant.

He was number one ranked Maharashtra player in 2022. In January 2023, he defeated India No.1 ranked player Kamal Chawla at The All India Snooker Open.

In 2023, He moved to Sheffield, England and practices in Ding Junhui Snooker Academy with former professional player Himanshu Jain and Hong Kong young snooker player Shaun Liu.

He took part in the Oceania/Asia Q School in May and June 2024, and at the second event won a two-year card on to the World Snooker Tour following wins in the latter rounds against Kwok Wai Fung and Muhammad Naseem.

=== 2024/25 ===
He made his professional debut at the 2024 Championship League in Leicester in June 2024. He secured his first win as a professional defeating Andrew Higginson at the 2024 Northern Ireland Open in September 2024. In December 2024 he reached the last-16 of the 2024 Snooker Shoot Out with wins over Xu Si and Ashley Carty.

=== 2025/26 ===
In June 2025, he was drawn to make his season debut in the first round of qualifying for the 2025 Wuhan Open where he was defeated by Stephen Maguire of Scotland 5-1. He was drawn in the round-robin stage of the 2025 Championship League against Wu Yize, Craig Steadman and Wang Yuchen. In April, he recorded a 10-6 loss over Steven Hallworth in the first round of qualifying for the 2026 World Snooker Championship. Having dropped off the tour at the conclusion of the 2025-26 season, he entered Q School in England, where he faced fellow former professional Stuart Carrington.

== Performance and rankings timeline ==
Tournament	2024/ 25	2025/ 26
Ranking (Note: It shows the ranking at the beginning of the season)	(Note: New players on the Main Tour don't have a ranking)	91
Ranking tournaments
Championship League	RR	RR
Saudi Arabia Masters	1R	1R
Wuhan Open	LQ	LQ
English Open	LQ	LQ
British Open	LQ	LQ
Xi'an Grand Prix	LQ	LQ
Northern Ireland Open	LQ	LQ
International Championship	LQ	LQ
UK Championship	LQ	LQ
Shoot Out	4R	1R
Scottish Open	LQ	LQ
German Masters	LQ	LQ
World Grand Prix	DNQ	DNQ
Players Championship	DNQ	DNQ
Welsh Open	LQ	LQ
World Open	LQ	LQ
Tour Championship	DNQ	DNQ
World Championship	LQ	LQ

Performance Table Legend
LQ	lost in the qualifying draw	#R	lost in the early rounds of the tournament (WR = Wildcard round, RR = Round robin)	QF	lost in the quarter-finals
SF	lost in the semi-finals	F	lost in the final	W	won the tournament
DNQ	did not qualify for the tournament	A	did not participate in the tournament	WD	withdrew from the tournament

NH / Not Held	means an event was not held.
NR / Non-Ranking Event	means an event is/was no longer a ranking event.
R / Ranking Event	means an event is/was a ranking event.
MR / Minor-Ranking Event	means an event is/was a minor-ranking event.

== Career finals ==
=== Amateur finals: 1 (1 title) ===
Outcome	No.	Year	Championship	Opponent in the final	Score
Winner	1.	2020	Indian Under-17 Championship	(India) Digvijay Kadian	4–1
