= 2024 Championship League =

2024 Championship League may refer to:

- 2024 Championship League (invitational), a snooker tournament held between January and March 2024
- 2024 Championship League (ranking), a snooker tournament held between June and July 2024
