= Joe O'Connor (snooker player) =

English snooker player

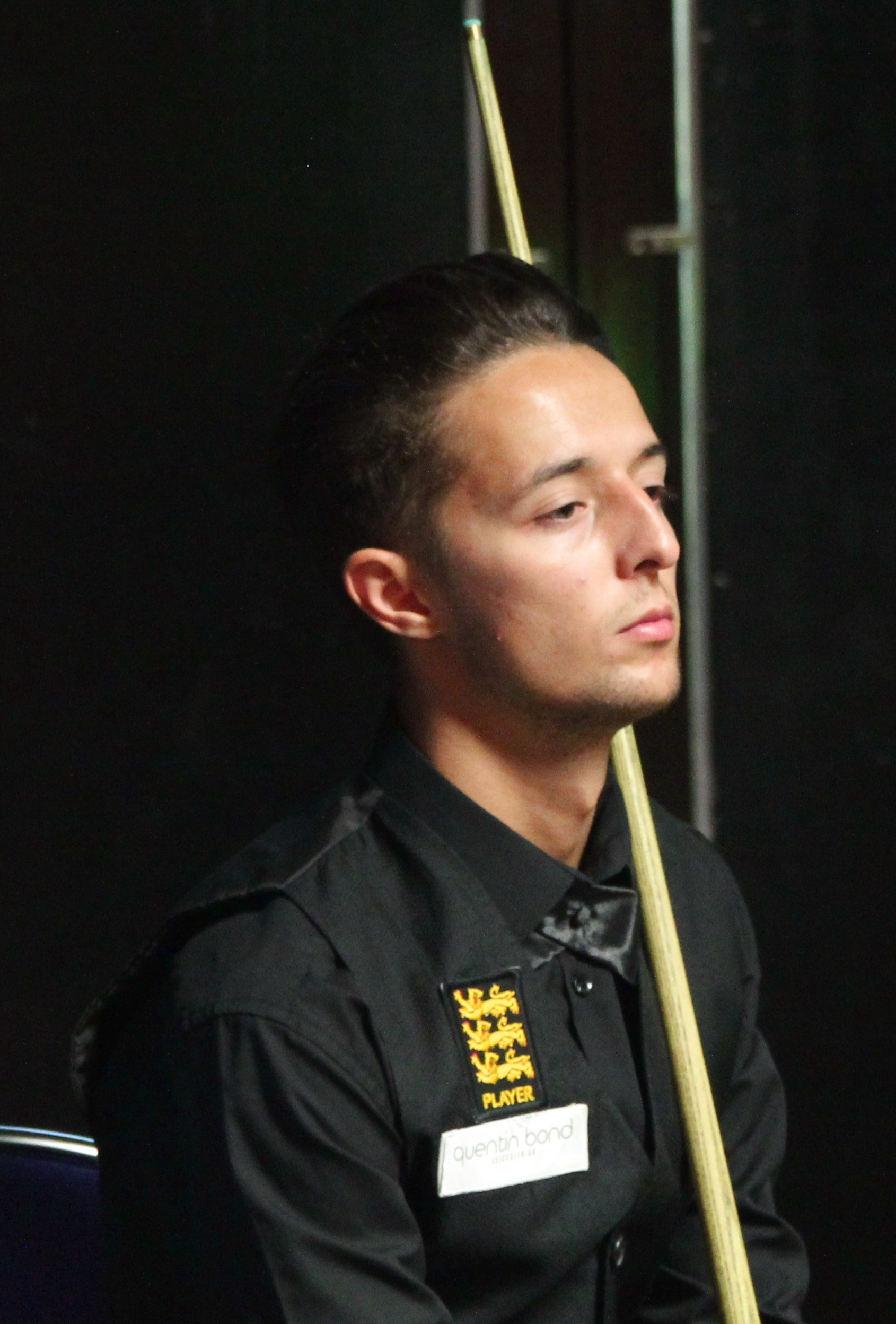
- Paul Hunter Classic 2017

Personal information
- Nickname: KO
- Born: 8 November 1995 (age 31) Leicester, England

Sport
- Country: England
- Sport: Snooker
- Professional: 2018–present
- Highest ranking: 25 (October 2025)
- Current ranking: 32 (as of 7 November 2026)
- Maximum breaks: 1
- Century breaks: 130 (as of 18 November 2026)
- Best ranking finish: Runner-up (x3)

Joe O'Connor (born 8 November 1995) is an English professional snooker player from Leicester. After winning the English Amateur Championship in June 2018, he turned professional in the 2018–19 snooker season. He has since reached three ranking finals, at the 2022 Scottish Open, the 2025 World Open, and the 2025 Championship League. He made his Crucible debut at the 2024 World Snooker Championship. His highest world ranking is 28th.

== Career ==
=== Amateur ===
Previously a junior pool champion, O'Connor won the under-20s event in 2012 at the IEPF World Eightball Championship. He also finished as runner-up in 2011 and 2013. Later he qualified for the snooker main draw as an amateur at the 2014 Wuxi Classic, then faced Neil Robertson at the 2014, and Mark Selby at the 2015 UK Championship. He won four events on the 2017–18 English amateur tour.

Ahead of the 2018–19 season, O'Connor defeated Brandon Sargeant 4–1 and then Oliver Brown 4–0 to secure a two-year professional tour card for the first time at the 2018 EBSA Play-Offs at the English Institute of Sport in Sheffield. In June 2018, he beat Andrew Norman 10–3 to become the English Amateur Champion before turning professional.

=== Professional ===
On 28 November 2018, O'Connor defeated world number 12 Ryan Day 6–2 in the first round at the 2018 UK Championship. In February 2019, he defeated top 10 players Kyren Wilson, Ding Junhui and John Higgins en route to his first ranking event semi-final at the Welsh Open, eventually losing 6–2 to Stuart Bingham. In the 2021 German Masters, he made it to the quarter-finals, but he lost 5–1 to Tom Ford.

==== 2022: First ranking final ====
In December 2022, O'Connor reached his first ranking final at the 2022 Scottish Open, defeating Zhao Xintong, Ding Junhui, Mark Williams, Ricky Walden and Neil Robertson throughout the tournament. However, he lost 9–2 to Gary Wilson.

In February 2023, O'Connor made it to the quarter-finals of the Welsh Open, but lost 5–4 to Pang Junxu, then he defeated number one seed Mark Allen at the Players Championship, before bowing out to Ali Carter at the semi-final stage. In April, he lost 8–10 to Andrew Higginson in the qualifying rounds of the World Championship. In November, he beat Stephen Maguire to qualify for the last-32 of the 2023 UK Championship.

==== 2024: First 147 break, Crucible debut ====
On 29 February 2024, O'Connor compiled his first maximum break, the 200th maximum in competitive snooker, during a 3–2 win against Elliot Slessor in the 2024 Championship League in his home town of Leicester. He won his group and made it to the final in the Winners' Group, but there he lost 1–3 to Mark Selby. In April, he qualified for the 2024 World Snooker Championship with a 10–8 win over Matthew Selt for his debut appearance at the tournament, where he was drawn against Mark Selby, whom he defeated 10–6 for his maiden win at the Crucible Theatre. His run ended though in the second round, as he was beaten 6–13 by Kyren Wilson.

O'Connor topped his group at the 2024 Championship League in Leicester in June 2024.

==== 2025: Two more ranking finals ====
O'Connor recorded a win over world champion Kyren Wilson as part of reaching the quarter-final of the 2025 Welsh Open. He recorded a 5-2 win over Judd Trump a 5-1 win over Shaun Murphy, and a 6-3 win over Ali Carter on his way to the final of the 2025 World Open, where he lost to John Higgins on 1 March 2025. He qualified for the 2025 World Snooker Championship with a 10-7 victory over Jackson Page, before losing 10-7 against John Higgins in the first round at The Crucible.

O'Connor topped his group at the 2025 Championship League in Leicester in July 2025, before ultimately reaching the final, where he was beaten by Stephen Maguire. In December 2025, he moved closer to qualification for the 2026 World Grand Prix as part of the top-32 of the one-year ranking list, with a quarter-final run including victories over Stan Moody, reigning World Champion Zhao Xintong, and Zak Surety at the 2025 Scottish Open. In the quarter-final, he was defeated 5-2 by Mark Allen.

==== 2026 ====
In September 2026, he reached the last-16 of the 2026 English Open before his run was ended by Ding Junhui.

=== Pool ===
He remains active in pool, and was named as a wildcard for the 2023 Ultimate Pool professional circuit, O’Connor defeated former Pro Series event winner Jake McCartney during his first Series weekend, and has since reached the last 32 of Event 4.

== Performance and rankings timeline ==
Tournament	2013/ 14	2014/ 15	2015/ 16	2016/ 17	2017/ 18	2018/ 19	2019/ 20	2020/ 21	2021/ 22	2022/ 23	2023/ 24	2024/ 25	2025/ 26	2026/ 27
Ranking (Note: It shows the ranking at the beginning of the season)	(Note: He was an amateur)					(Note: New players on the Main Tour don't have a ranking)	68	62	62	47	31	29	28	27
Ranking tournaments
Championship League	Non-Ranking Event							RR	RR	RR	RR	2R	F	RR
China Open	A	1R	A	A	A	2R	Tournament Not Held							LQ
Wuhan Open	Tournament Not Held										1R	LQ	2R	LQ
British Open	Tournament Not Held								4R	2R	LQ	LQ	2R	LQ
English Open	Not Held			A	LQ	1R	2R	3R	1R	1R	1R	2R	1R	3R
Shenzhen Open (Note: The event was called the Xi'an Grand Prix (2024/2025–2025/2026))	Tournament Not Held											1R	1R	LQ
Northern Ireland Open	Not Held			A	A	1R	2R	1R	LQ	LQ	LQ	1R	1R	2R
International Championship	A	LQ	LQ	A	A	LQ	LQ	Not Held			1R	2R	LQ	1R
UK Championship	A	1R	1R	A	A	3R	1R	3R	2R	LQ	1R	LQ	LQ	
Shoot Out	Non-Ranking			A	A	1R	1R	1R	1R	1R	3R	2R	1R	
Scottish Open	Not Held			A	A	1R	3R	2R	LQ	F	2R	2R	QF	
German Masters	A	LQ	LQ	A	A	LQ	LQ	QF	LQ	1R	2R	2R	LQ	LQ
Welsh Open	A	1R	1R	A	A	SF	1R	3R	LQ	QF	1R	QF	2R	
World Grand Prix	NH	NR	DNQ	DNQ	DNQ	DNQ	DNQ	DNQ	DNQ	2R	DNQ	DNQ	1R	
Players Championship (Note: The event was called the Players Tour Championship Grand Final (2013/2014–2015/2016))	DNQ	DNQ	DNQ	DNQ	DNQ	DNQ	DNQ	DNQ	DNQ	SF	DNQ	DNQ	DNQ	
World Open	A	Not Held		A	A	LQ	LQ	Not Held			LQ	F	LQ	
Tour Championship	Tournament Not Held					DNQ	DNQ	DNQ	DNQ	DNQ	DNQ	DNQ	DNQ	
World Championship	A	LQ	LQ	A	A	LQ	LQ	LQ	LQ	LQ	2R	1R	LQ	
Non-ranking tournaments
Championship League	A	A	A	A	A	A	RR	A	A	A	F	RR	WD	
Former ranking tournaments
Wuxi Classic	A	1R	Tournament Not Held											
Australian Goldfields Open	A	LQ	LQ	Tournament Not Held										
Shanghai Masters	A	LQ	LQ	A	A	Non-Ranking		Not Held			Non-Ranking Event			
Paul Hunter Classic	Minor-Ranking			A	3R	3R	NR	Tournament Not Held						
Indian Open	A	LQ	NH	A	A	LQ	Tournament Not Held							
Riga Masters (Note: The event was called the Riga Open (2014/2015–2015/2016))	NH	Minor-Ranking		A	A	2R	WD	Tournament Not Held						
China Championship	Not Held			NR	A	LQ	1R	Tournament Not Held						
WST Pro Series	Tournament Not Held							RR	Tournament Not Held					
Turkish Masters	Tournament Not Held								1R	Tournament Not Held				
Gibraltar Open	Not Held		MR	1R	1R	1R	1R	1R	1R	Tournament Not Held				
WST Classic	Tournament Not Held									2R	Tournament Not Held			
European Masters	Not Held			A	A	LQ	LQ	3R	LQ	LQ	1R	Not Held		
Saudi Arabia Masters	Tournament Not Held											4R	5R	NH
Former non-ranking tournaments
Six-red World Championship	A	A	A	A	A	A	A	Not Held		LQ	Tournament Not Held			

Performance Table Legend
LQ	lost in the qualifying draw	#R	lost in the early rounds of the tournament (WR = Wildcard round, RR = Round robin)	QF	lost in the quarter-finals
SF	lost in the semi-finals	F	lost in the final	W	won the tournament
DNQ	did not qualify for the tournament	A	did not participate in the tournament	WD	withdrew from the tournament

NH / Not Held	means an event was not held.
NR / Non-Ranking Event	means an event is/was no longer a ranking event.
R / Ranking Event	means an event is/was a ranking event.
MR / Minor-Ranking Event	means an event is/was a minor-ranking event.

== Career finals ==
=== Ranking finals: 3 ===
Outcome	No.	Year	Championship	Opponent in the final	Score
Runner-up	1.	2022	Scottish Open	(England) Gary Wilson	2–9
Runner-up	2.	2025	World Open	(Scotland) John Higgins	6–10
Runner-up	3.	2025	Championship League	(Scotland) Stephen Maguire	1–3

=== Non-ranking finals: 1 ===
Outcome	No.	Year	Championship	Opponent in the final	Score
Runner-up	1.	2024	Championship League Invitational	(England) Mark Selby	1–3

=== Amateur finals: 1 (1 title) ===
Outcome	No.	Year	Championship	Opponent in the final	Score
Winner	1.	2018	English Amateur Championship	(England) Andrew Norman	10–3
