= 2024 World Snooker Championship =

Professional snooker tournament

2024 Cazoo World Snooker Championship

Tournament information
- Dates: 20 April – 6 May 2024
- Venue: Crucible Theatre
- City: Sheffield
- Country: England
- Organisation: World Snooker Tour
- Format: Ranking event
- Total prize fund: £2,395,000
- Winner's share: £500,000
- Highest break: Noppon Saengkham (THA) (147)

Final
- Champion: Kyren Wilson (ENG)
- Runner-up: Jak Jones (WAL)
- Score: 18‍–‍14

The 2024 World Snooker Championship (officially the 2024 Cazoo World Snooker Championship) was a professional snooker tournament that took place from 20 April to 6 May 2024. Organised by the World Snooker Tour, it was the 17th and final ranking event of the 2023‍–‍24 season, and was sponsored for the second time by Cazoo.

Staged at the Crucible Theatre in Sheffield, England, the tournament was the 48th consecutive World Snooker Championship to be held at the venue, where it has taken place annually since 1977. The qualifying rounds were played from 8 to 17 April at the English Institute of Sport, also in Sheffield. The event was broadcast domestically in the United Kingdom by the BBC, Eurosport and Discovery+, and by various other broadcasters worldwide. The winner received £500,000 from a total prize fund of £2,395,000.

Kyren Wilson won the event, defeating qualifier Jak Jones 18‍–‍14 in the final to become the 28th snooker world champion. The defending champion, Luca Brecel, who had defeated Mark Selby in the 2023 final for his first world title, lost in the first round to David Gilbert and became the 19th player to experience the so-called "Crucible curse". There were 63 century breaks compiled in the main stage of the tournament, with a further 122 recorded in the qualifying rounds. Noppon Saengkham made a maximum break in the third round of qualifying.

== Background ==
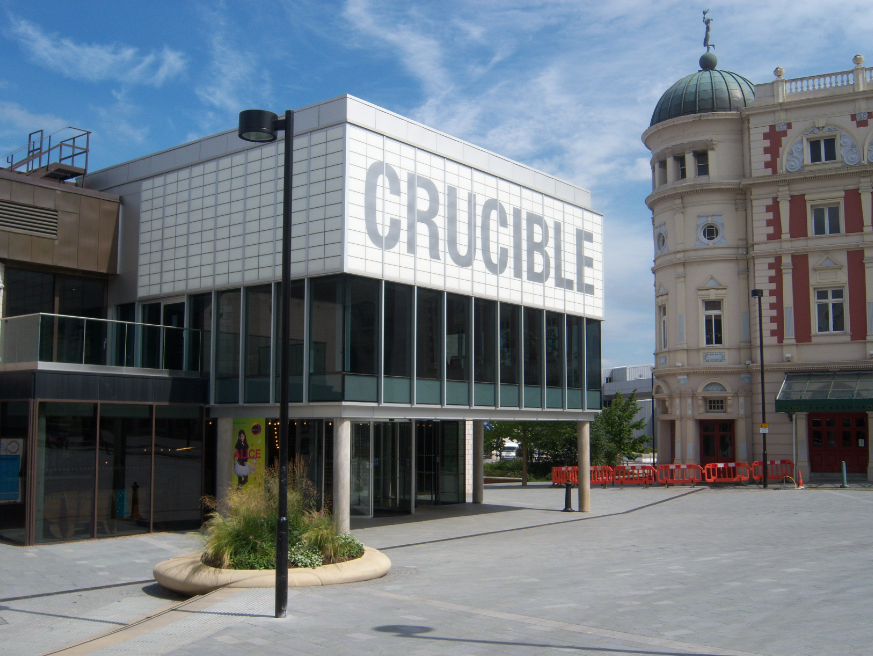
The main stage of the tournament was held at the Crucible Theatre in Sheffield, England, for the 48th consecutive year.

The first World Snooker Championship concluded in 1927. It became an annual knockout tournament in 1969, which is considered the beginning of the championship's "modern era". The 1977 tournament was the first to be staged at the Crucible Theatre in Sheffield, England, which has hosted every subsequent iteration.

The 2024 event was organised by the World Snooker Tour. The title sponsor was car retailer Cazoo, for the second time, so it was promoted as the 2024 Cazoo World Snooker Championship. It was the 48th consecutive year that the tournament was held at the Crucible and the 56th successive year that the World Championship had been contested through the modern knockout format.

Luca Brecel was the defending champion, having defeated Mark Selby 18‍–‍15 in the 2023 final to win his first world title. At the 2024 event, he attempted to overcome the Crucible curse, which has allegedly prevented any first-time champion from retaining the title since the tournament moved to the Crucible in 1977.

=== Format ===
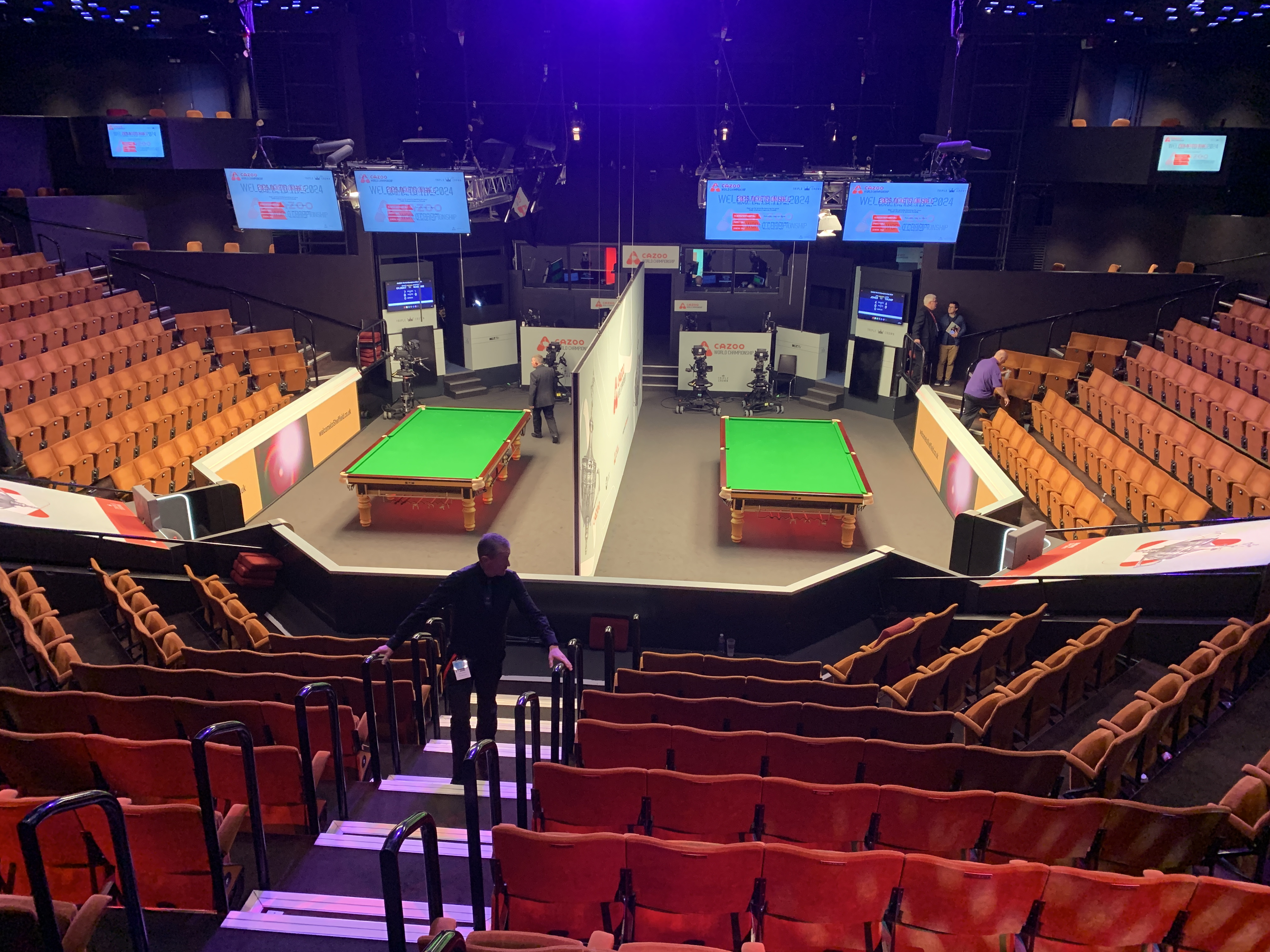
The setup inside the arena at the Crucible Theatre during the event

Qualifying took place from 8 to 17 April 2024 at the English Institute of Sport in Sheffield, England. A total of 128 players competed over four qualifying rounds for 16 places in the main stage. The players included professionals outside the top 16 of the snooker world rankings and 18 leading amateur players. Several professional players that did not enter the qualifying rounds were replaced by amateurs based on the 2023 Q School Order of Merit.

The main stage of the championship was held from 20 April to 6 May at the Crucible Theatre in Sheffield. The top 16 players in the world rankings were seeded per their standing following the 2024 Tour Championship and were drawn randomly against the 16 successful qualifiers in the first round. The draw was broadcast on BBC Radio 5 Live on 18 April.

All qualifying matches and first-round matches were played as the best of 19 frames over two sessions. Second-round matches and quarter-finals were the best of 25 frames, played over three sessions. Semi-finals were the best of 33 frames and the final was the best of 35 frames, all three matches played over four sessions.

=== Broadcasters ===
The qualifying matches were broadcast by Discovery+ in Europe (including the United Kingdom and Ireland); Huya in China; and Matchroom.live in all other territories. Round four of qualifying, called "Judgement Day", was also streamed on World Snooker Tour's YouTube and Facebook pages.

The main stages of the event were broadcast by the BBC in the United Kingdom; Discovery+ and Eurosport in Europe (including the United Kingdom and Ireland); CCTV-5, Migu, Youku, and Huya in mainland China; DAZN in the United States and Brazil; Now TV in Hong Kong; Astro SuperSport in Malaysia and Brunei; TrueVisions in Thailand; Sportcast in Taiwan; Premier Sports Network in the Philippines; Fastsports in Pakistan; and Matchroom.live in all other territories.

=== Prize fund ===
The winner of the event received £500,000 from a total prize fund of £2,395,000. The breakdown of prize money is shown below:

- Winner: £500,000
- Runner-up: £200,000
- Semi-finalists: £100,000
- Quarter-finalists: £50,000
- Last 16: £30,000
- Last 32: £20,000
- Last 48: £15,000
- Last 80: £10,000
- Last 112: £5,000
- Highest break (qualifying stage included): £15,000
- Total: £2,395,000

A bonus of £40,000 was offered for a maximum break made at the Crucible and £10,000 for a maximum made in the qualifying rounds. These bonuses were in addition to the £15,000 highest-break prize and would be shared in the case of multiple maximums. An additional bonus of £147,000 was offered for any player making two maximum breaks during the season's Triple Crown events. The latter bonus could be won up to three times, including multiple times by the same player, e.g. if one player made six maximums in Triple Crown events, they would win the bonus three times, for a total prize of £441,000. Prior to the 2024 World Championship, three players had already made maximums that counted toward this bonus—Xu Si made a maximum in the 2023 UK Championship qualifying rounds, and Ding Junhui and Mark Allen each made one at the 2024 Masters. Xu was defeated by Alfie Burden in qualifying, Ding was beaten by Jack Lisowski in the first round, and Allen was defeated by John Higgins in the second round.

== Summary ==
=== Qualifying ===
Qualifying was held from 8 to 17 April at the English Institute of Sport in Sheffield. The seven-time champion Stephen Hendry chose not to enter. He had previously opted not to enter the 2022 event, and lost in the first qualifying round at the 2023 event. Martin Gould withdrew from the tournament for health reasons, having not played professionally since December 2023; his opponent, six-time runner-up Jimmy White, received a walkover. Ending the season at 129th and 81st place, respectively, in the world rankings, Hendry and Gould were both set to be relegated from the professional tour, but Gould was later given a 12-month extension on medical grounds.

==== First qualification round ====
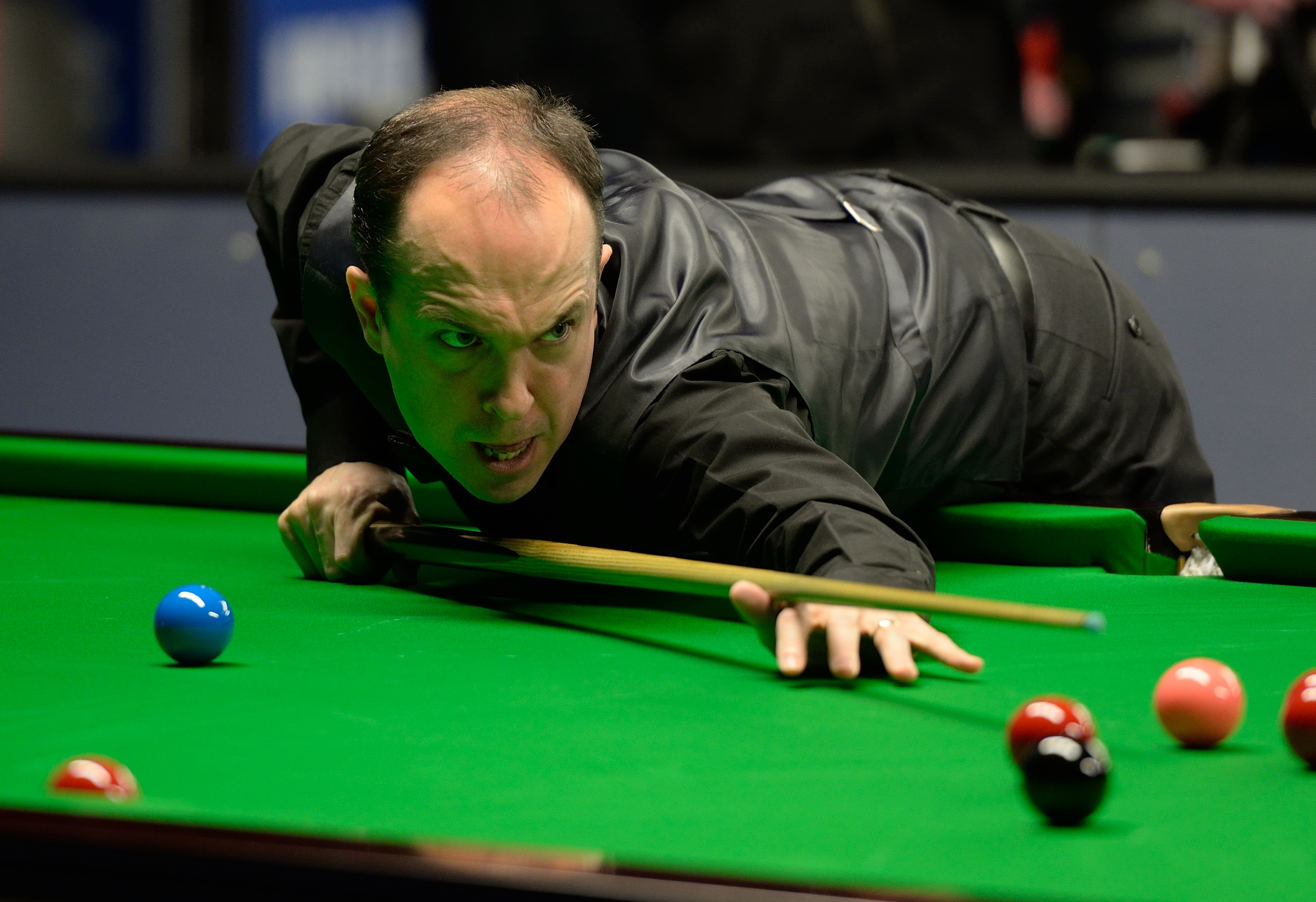
Fergal O'Brien (pictured in 2015) retired from the professional tour (which he had first joined in 1991) after losing 8‍–‍10 to Mostafa Dorgham.

The first qualifying round took place from 8 to 10 April and featured players ranked 81st to 112th against players ranked 113th and below, plus selected amateurs, including three players who had received two-year tour cards, playing as professionals for the first time beginning in the 2024‍–‍25 season. Liam Davies won the 2024 EBSA European Under-21 Championship to earn his tour card. He defeated Ryan Thomerson 10‍–‍3. Cheung Ka Wai, aged 25, and Bulcsú Révész, aged 17, won the 2024 WSF Open Championship and the 2024 WSF World Junior Championship, respectively, for their tour cards. Cheung led Ross Muir 9‍–‍6, but Muir recovered to win 10‍–‍9. Révész, who is the first Hungarian player on the professional tour, trailed Sean O'Sullivan 1‍–‍6 but took nine of the next 11 frames to win the match 10‍–‍8. Of the 18 amateur players, five progressed to the second round. In addition to Davies and Révész, Gao Yang beat Ishpreet Singh Chadha, Haydon Pinhey defeated Hammad Miah, and Mohammed Shehab beat Stan Moody.

Former Shoot Out winner Michael Holt secured his return to the tour in the 2024‍–‍25 season through the Q Tour, but he was defeated 10‍–‍6 by Xing Zihao. Ian Burns defeated Dean Young 10‍–‍1, while Alexander Ursenbacher beat 18-year-old Iulian Boiko in a 10‍–‍0 whitewash. Veteran player Fergal O'Brien, the 1999 British Open champion and runner-up at the 2001 Masters, had previously announced plans to retire at the end of the 2023‍–‍24 season. He lost 8‍–‍10 to Mostafa Dorgham.

Five female players took part in the tournament. Bai Yulu had won the 2024 World Women's Championship to earn a two-year tour card beginning in the 2024‍–‍25 season. She played Jenson Kendrick, who led 6‍–‍2 after the first session. Bai narrowed her deficit to two frames at 7‍–‍9 and forced a re-spotted black in the 17th frame after acquiring foul points from a snooker, but Kendrick potted the black to win 10‍–‍7. Reanne Evans, the 12-time Women's World Champion, was whitewashed 10‍–‍0 by Oliver Brown, while Baipat Siripaporn, the 2023 Women's World Champion, lost 1‍–‍10 to Marco Fu, a former two-time World Championship semi-finalist. Mink Nutcharut, the 2022 Women's World Champion, led Adam Duffy 4‍–‍1, but Duffy won nine of the last ten frames for a 10‍–‍5 victory. Rebecca Kenna lost 1‍–‍10 to Alfie Burden.

==== Second qualification round ====
The second qualifying round took place from 10 to 13 April and featured players ranked 49th to 80th against the winners of the first qualification round. Two former winners started in the second qualification round. The 1997 champion Ken Doherty was defeated by Marco Fu, and the 2006 winner Graeme Dott defeated Mostafa Dorgham. Six-time runner-up Jimmy White was defeated by Liu Hongyu 3‍–‍10.

All five remaining amateur players lost in the second qualification round. Bulcsú Révész and Mohammed Shebab were the closest to progressing, losing 8‍–‍10 to James Cahill and Tian Pengfei, respectively. Two players were defeated on a deciding frame. Liam Highfield was defeated by Stuart Carrington and Allan Taylor lost to Lukas Kleckers. Both Highfield and Taylor lost their professional status after being eliminated from the competition. The match between Taylor and Kleckers was decided on the final black ball. Former European Masters winner Fan Zhengyi was defeated by Jiang Jun.

==== Third qualification round ====
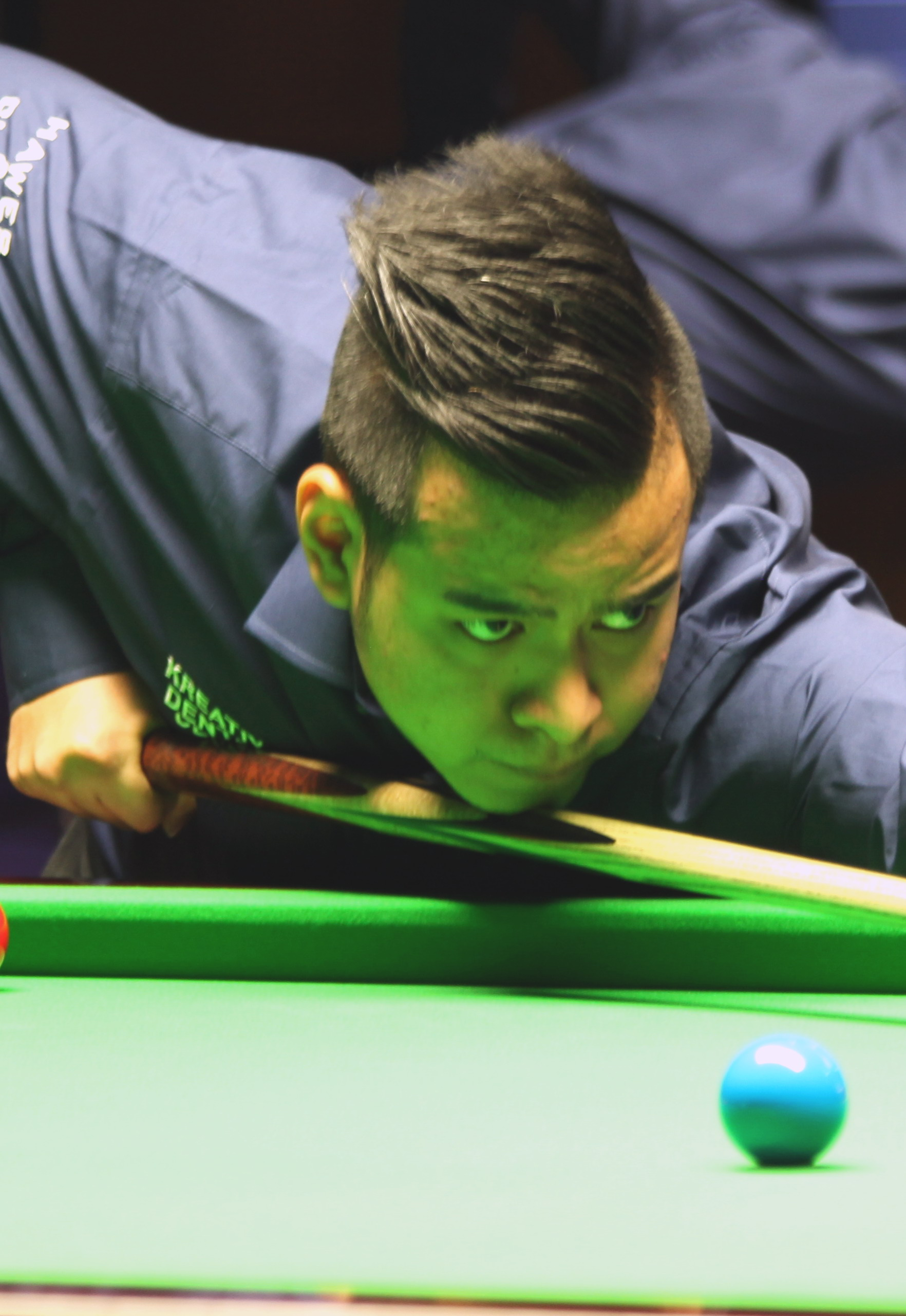
Noppon Saengkham (pictured in 2015) completed a maximum break in the third round of qualification.

The third qualifying round took place from 13 to 15 April and featured players ranked 17th to 48th against the winners of the second qualification round. Jack Lisowski entered in the third qualifying round, having been an automatic qualifier every year since 2018. He made four century breaks as he defeated Liu Hongyu 10‍–‍4. Former finalist Matthew Stevens defeated Jimmy Robertson 10‍–‍6. Anthony McGill lost 5‍–‍10 to He Guoqiang, having successfully qualified for the main event in each of the last nine seasons. Jenson Kendrick, who entered the first round of qualifying, defeated Jordan Brown, needing to qualify for the main stage to remain as a professional.

Noppon Saengkham, playing Andy Hicks, made a maximum break in the tenth frame and went 7‍–‍3 ahead, later winning 10‍–‍5. Stuart Bingham, who had appeared at the main stage every year since 2010, trailed Stuart Carrington 3‍–‍7 but recovered to win 10‍–‍9.

==== Fourth qualification round ====
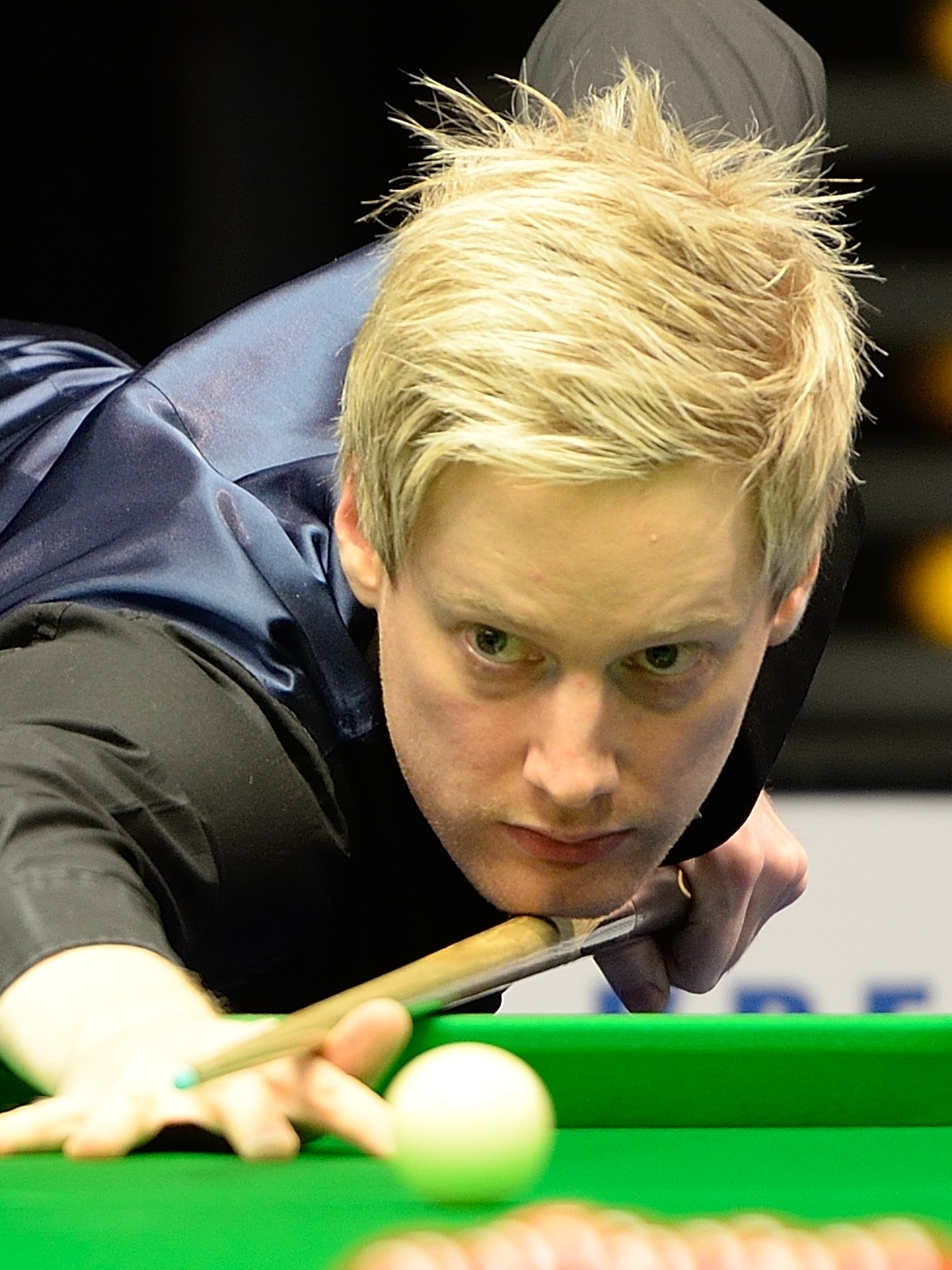
Neil Robertson (pictured in 2015) failed to qualify for the main stage of the event for the first time in twenty years.

The fourth and final qualifying round took place on 16 and 17 April. The 2010 champion Neil Robertson failed to qualify for the main stage of the event for the first time in 20 years, after losing in a deciding frame to Jamie Jones. Si Jiahui, who reached the semi-final in 2023, lost the first four frames to Wu Yize but then won ten frames in a row to gain a 10‍–‍4 victory. Dominic Dale qualified for the event for the first time since 2014 as he defeated He Guoqiang. At 52 years old, Dale was the oldest qualifier since Steve Davis in the 2010 event. He credited his upturn in form to his new French girlfriend. Mark Davis lost in a deciding frame in the final round for a second successive year. He lost 9‍–‍10 to Ricky Walden. The 17th seed Jack Lisowski defeated Matthew Stevens 10‍–‍3, making six century breaks.

Only three low-ranked players progressed to the fourth round from the first round. Louis Heathcote (ranked 100th) was defeated 10‍–‍8 by Stuart Bingham. Heathcote was ahead 8‍–‍7 but missed a pot on the pink that would have opened up a two-frame lead. Jenson Kendrick (ranked 103rd) lost his tour card following a 7‍–‍10 loss to Lyu Haotian. Jiang Jun (ranked 110th) was defeated by Hossein Vafaei 5‍–‍10 in the final qualifying round. Joe O'Connor was the only debutant to qualify for the main stage of the event. He led 9‍–‍8 before winning the final frame of the match, which lasted over 1 hour and 50 minutes, the second-longest frame ever played.

=== Main stage ===
The draw for the last 32 was made on 18 April on BBC Radio 5 Live and BBC Sport with Rob Walker and Mark Allen. On the evening of 19 April, Hendry and comedian Mark Watson hosted a live edition of the official World Snooker Tour podcast Snooker Club at the Crucible Theatre, where they were joined by Judd Trump and comedian Jon Richardson.

==== First round ====
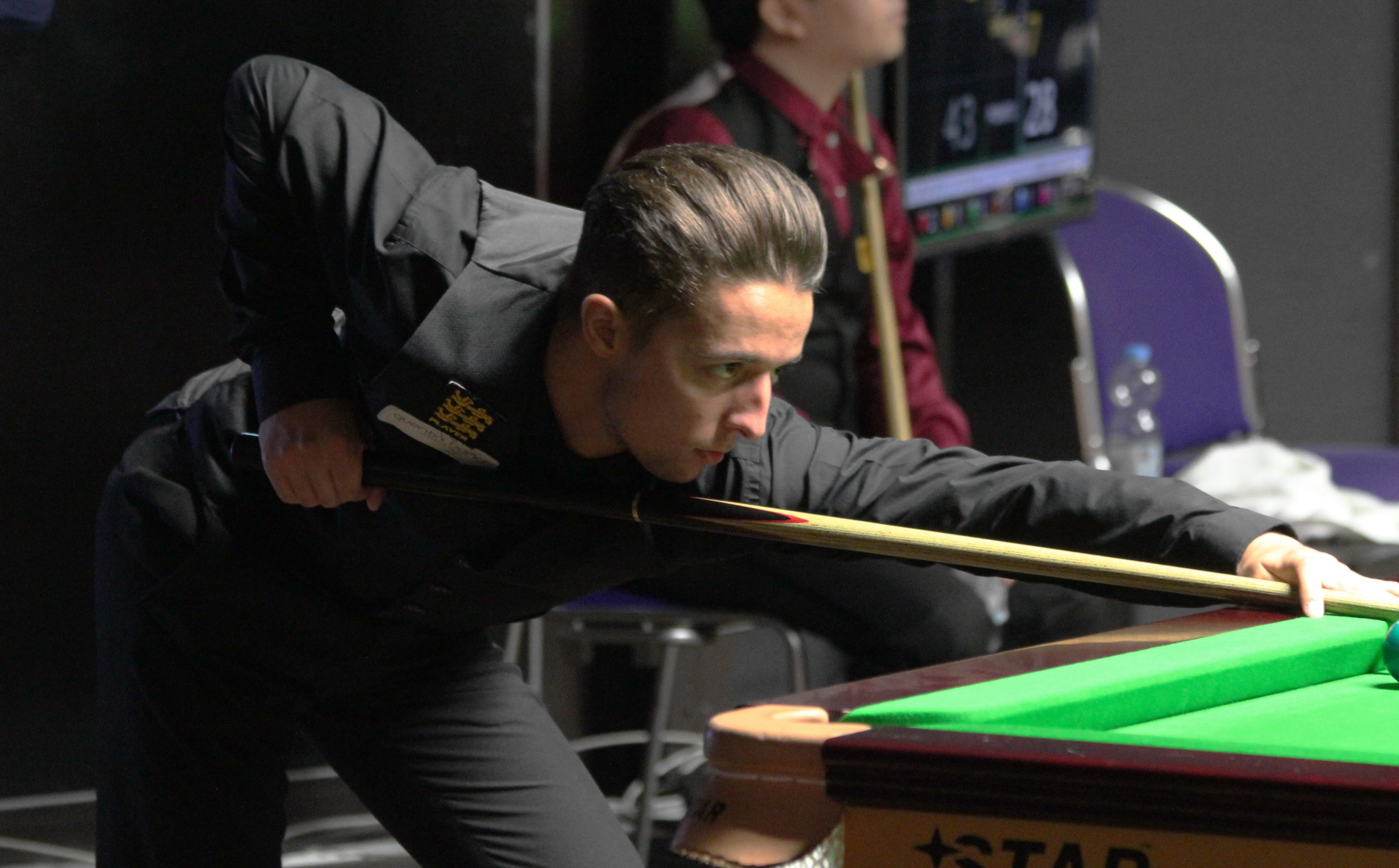
In his debut match, Joe O'Connor (pictured in 2017) defeated four-time world champion Mark Selby 10‍–‍6.

The first round took place from 20 to 25 April, each match played as the best of 19 frames over two sessions. Of the sixteen seeded players, eight were defeated in the opening round. Luca Brecel, the defending champion and top seed, met 2019 semi-finalist David Gilbert in the opening match. Between the two, they made seven breaks above 70 in nine frames and Brecel led 6‍–‍3. Brecel moved to 9‍–‍6 ahead but was unable to win the match as he was defeated in a deciding frame. Post match, Brecel commented that he had been unwell and had not liked the spotlight of being defending champion, but he praised Gilbert's performance. The highest ranked qualifier, Jack Lisowski, defeated Ding Junhui in a deciding frame. Jak Jones and Zhang Anda's first session was finished after only playing seven of the nine frames due to slow play. Leading 5‍–‍2, Jones gained a 10‍–‍4 victory in the second session. Despite trailing 4‍–‍5 after the first session, Stephen Maguire defeated ninth seed Ali Carter 10‍–‍7. Fifth seed and four-time champion Mark Selby lost 6‍–‍10 to debutant Joe O'Connor. Selby stated that he was going to re-evaluate retirement after the championship. Qualifier Stuart Bingham defeated Gary Wilson 10‍–‍5. Wilson commented that his form had been "like putting myself through torture". Si Jiahui led sixth seed Mark Williams 8‍–‍5, but Williams tied the score at 9‍–‍9. Si made a break of 77 to win the match. He commented that he did not feel the pressure, as he was the challenger to Williams. Ryan Day defeated 15th seed Barry Hawkins 10‍–‍8. Hawkins won six frames in a row to lead 8‍–‍5 before Day won the next five to win the match.

The third seed Judd Trump led Hossein Vafaei 6‍–‍3 after the first session, despite being significantly behind on points in six of the frames. Trump gained a 10‍–‍5 victory in the second session. Following the loss, Vafaei commented that the arena "smelled" and that the practice tables were "like playing in a garage". Tom Ford, who was playing as a seeded player for the first time, defeated Ricky Walden 10‍–‍6. Ford had previously lost all four of his matches at the event. Shaun Murphy won five frames in a row as he defeated Lyu Haotian 10‍–‍5. Murphy, who had lost his previous two first round World Championship matches, called the result "rewarding". Robert Milkins survived a deciding frame as he defeated Pang Junxu 10‍–‍9. Dominic Dale made a break of 120 in the only frame he won, as he played Kyren Wilson. Wilson completed a 10‍–‍1 victory, making a half-century or better in nine frames. Seven-time champion Ronnie O'Sullivan also gained a 10‍–‍1 victory as he defeated Jackson Page. Four-time champion John Higgins trailed Jamie Jones 1‍–‍3 but eventually won 10‍–‍6. World number three Mark Allen gained a 10‍–‍6 victory over Robbie Williams.

==== Second round ====
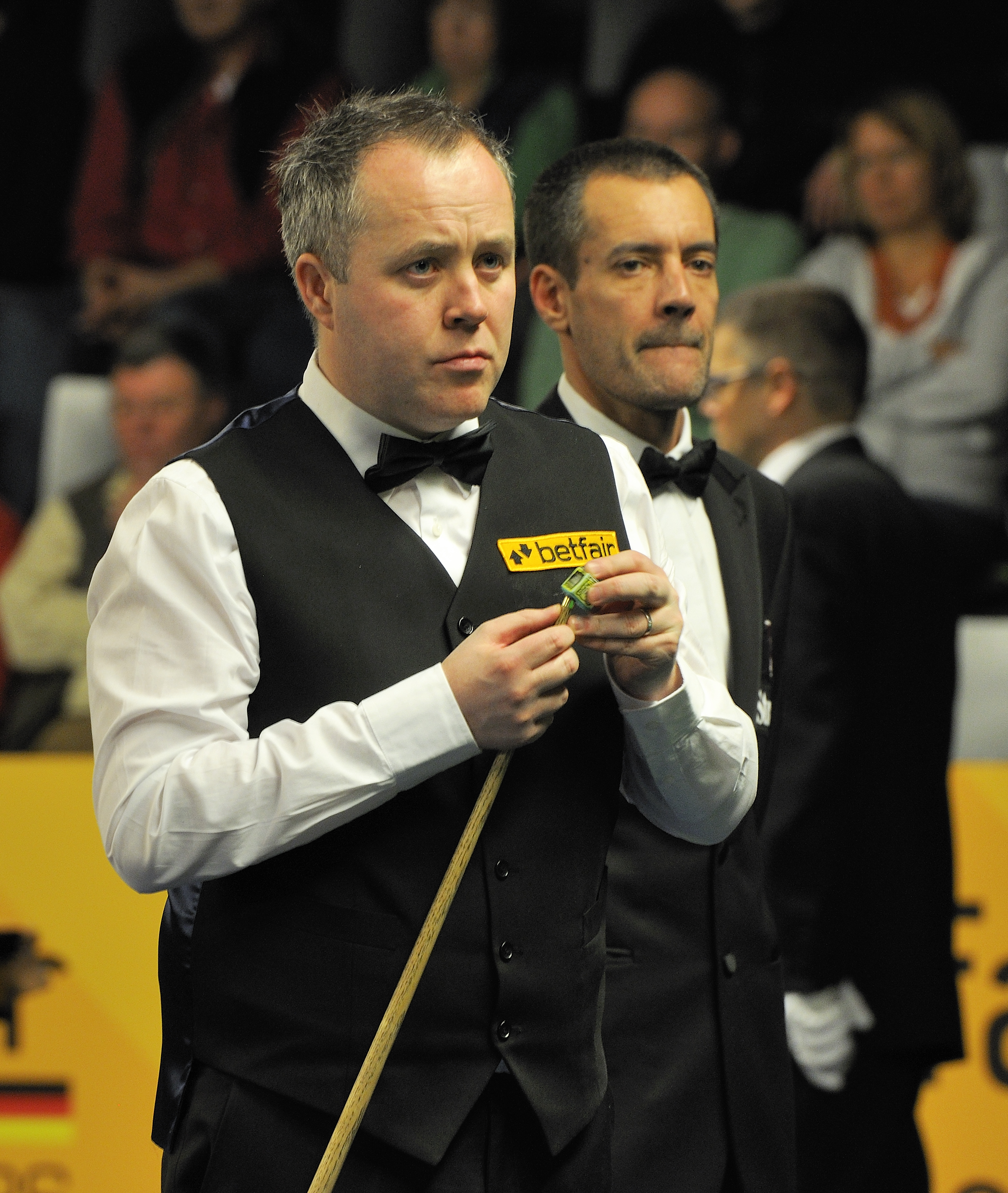
John Higgins (pictured in 2013) defeated Mark Allen on a deciding frame to retain his top-16 status.

The second round took place from 25 to 29 April, each match played as the best of 25 frames over three sessions. Trailing 4‍–‍7 against David Gilbert, Milkins threw his cue stick to the ground in frustration after missing a pot. Gilbert won the remaining frames of the match to win 13‍–‍4. Trump gained an early lead against Tom Ford, winning four frames in a row, from 2‍–‍2 to 6‍–‍2. He made seven breaks of above 50 to lead 11‍–‍5 after the second session. Trump gained a 13‍–‍7 victory in the third session. Ford commented "You can get away with one bad session here, but not two". Jak Jones opened a 6‍–‍2 lead over Si Jiahui after the first session, but the lead was reduced to two frames, as he led 9‍–‍7 after the second session. Jones gained a 13‍–‍9 victory in the final session. In progressing to the quarter-finals, he was the first player in 25 years (since Matthew Stevens in 1998 and 1999) to reach the quarter-finals in his first two World Championship appearances. Murphy and Maguire met in the second round of the event, having been "rivals since children". In winning a couple of frames, Murphy celebrated with a fist bump. However, when winning the frame to lead 10‍–‍6, Maguire punched the table and celebrated wildly and later went on to win the match 13‍–‍9. Maguire commented after the match that his attention had been strengthened after seeing Murphy celebrate the previous frame wins.

O'Sullivan played Ryan Day, who had not defeated O'Sullivan in the previous 13 years. Leading 10‍–‍6 after the second session, O'Sullivan won three out of four frames to complete a 13‍–‍7 victory. Kyren Wilson led O'Connor 10‍–‍6 after the second session of their match and won three straight frames to win 13‍–‍6. Bingham led Lisowski 9‍–‍7 going into the final session. Lisowski missed a frame ball shot on the pink ball to tie the match at 10‍–‍10 but made breaks of 84 and 124 to tie the score at 11‍–‍11. Lisowski missed another pot on the pink in frame 23, with Bingham making a clearance to win the frame and later gaining a 13‍–‍11 victory. John Higgins met Mark Allen in a second-round tie, where Higgins was required to win to remain in the top 16 in the snooker world rankings. They had met five times previously in the season, with Higgins winning three. The pair were tied at 4‍–‍4 after the first session, but Allen opened up a two-frame lead after the second session. Allen won the first frame of the final session, but Higgins won the next three to tie the score at 10‍–‍10. Allen took the lead twice, but Higgins tied the match again at 12‍–‍12. With Allen leading by 62 points, Higgins made a double, followed by a 71 break to win the match 13‍–‍12. After the match, Higgins called the break in the deciding frame "one of my best", and commented, "I'm over the moon. I think it will hit me later that it was a special clearance. I'm proud of myself." Allen commented, "I had more than enough chances to win it and credit to John [Higgins], he does what John does and clears up in the deciding frame."

==== Quarter-finals ====
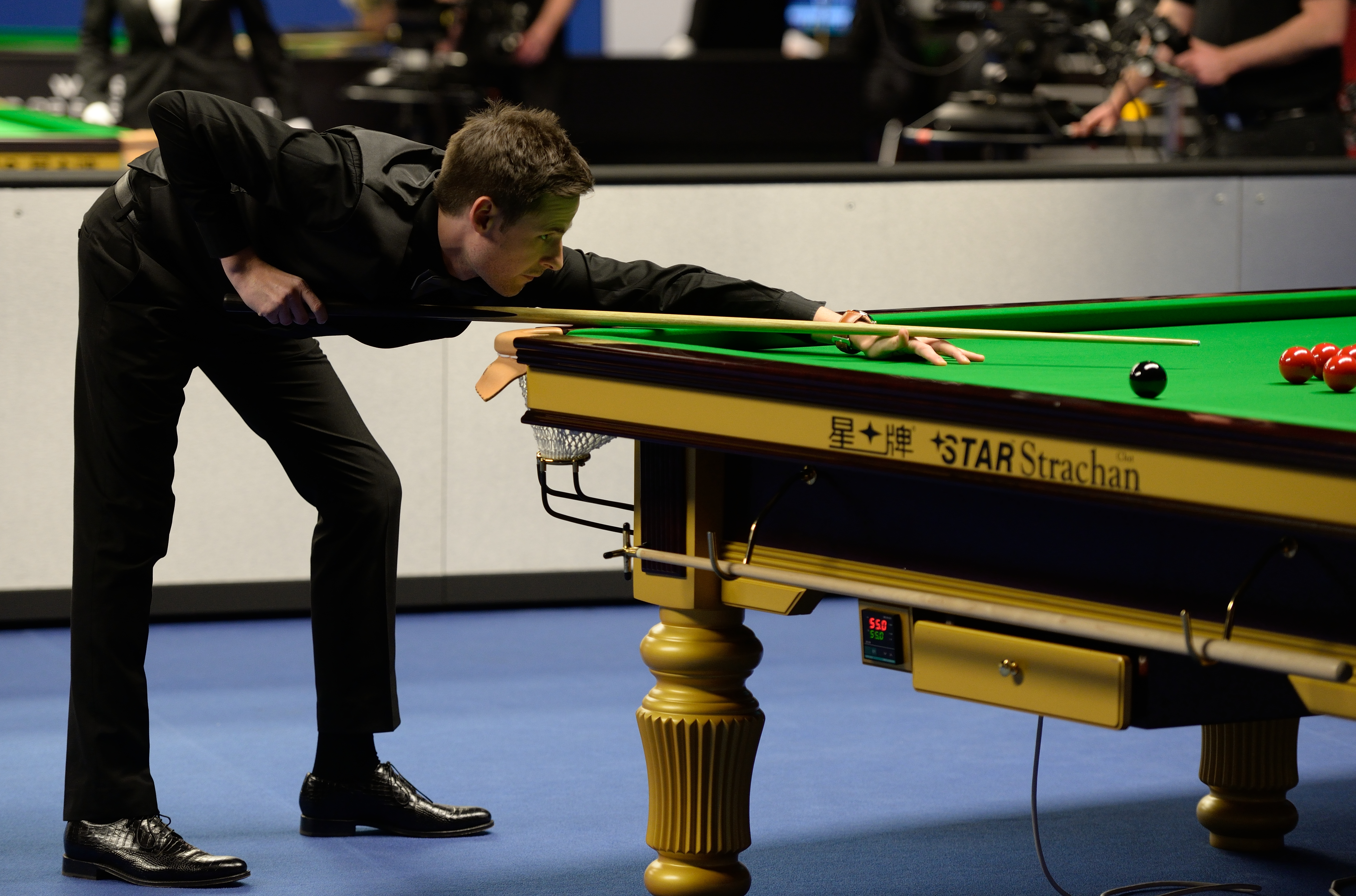
David Gilbert (pictured in 2015) reached the World Championship semi-finals for a second time, after defeating Stephen Maguire 13‍–‍8.

The quarter-finals took place from 30 April to 1 May, each match played as the best of 25 frames over three sessions. For the first time since 1992, four of the eight quarter-finalists were qualifiers. Jak Jones won three of the first four frames and went ahead 4‍–‍3 before Judd Trump took frame eight to tie the match, despite needing a snooker. Jones won the first two frames of the second session, the second of which lasted over 55 minutes. Trump again tied the score at 7‍–‍7 and won frame 15 to go into the lead, but a 115 break by Jones in the final frame of the session tied the score with one session left to play. Jones won the opening frame on the resumption of the match but went in-off in the second, allowing Trump to draw level at 9‍–‍9. Trump, however, did not win another frame and was defeated 9‍–‍13. Jones commented, "I feel good and pleased to get through. I thought Judd [Trump] struggled. He started with a century and it kind of motivated me." Trump agreed, saying "Playing like that, he did me a favour because I'd have lost 17‍–‍0 [in the next round]."

David Gilbert opened up a 7‍–‍1 lead in the first session of his match against Stephen Maguire. Gilbert won the first frame of the second session to open up a seven-frame lead and then went ahead 9‍–‍2. Maguire, however, won four of the remaining five frames of the session to trail 6‍–‍10. Maguire took two of the first three frames of the third session to further close the gap at 8‍–‍11, but Gilbert won the remaining frames of the match to win 13‍–‍8. Despite requiring only one snooker, Maguire conceded the match in the final frame. Gilbert commented afterwards that he was "relieved" and would "buy [Maguire] a pint" because of his withdrawal. Maguire commented that he had not had much luck during the match and that playing on would be "a waste of time".

Kyren Wilson had lost all of his previous matches against John Higgins at the World Championship, including a semi-final loss in 2018 and a 2‍–‍13 second-round loss in 2023. Wilson won the first four frames of the match and drew ahead 5‍–‍1, but Higgins won the last two frames of the first session to trail by two frames. Wilson took four of the next five frames to open up a five-frame lead at 9‍–‍4, but Higgins won the remaining three frames of the second session to again trail by only two frames. Higgins later commented that he felt like he had "won the lottery" at getting the score to that point. Higgins won the first frame of the third session to trail by just one frame, but Wilson took the next four to win the match 13‍–‍8. Wilson stated, "To come off the back of absolute annihilation from John here last year, I had to put that to one side." Higgins commented that "the best man won" and "I hope [Wilson] is holding the trophy aloft with his son on Bank Holiday Monday." He also commented that he "didn't want that to be the last I play at the Crucible." Despite the loss, in making the quarter-finals, Higgins was able to retain his top-16 status in the world rankings.

After eleven frames, Ronnie O'Sullivan led Stuart Bingham 6‍–‍5. In frame 12, a situation occurred where the referee, Desislava Bozhilova, was unable to properly re-spot the black ball after it was potted, leaving O'Sullivan with a relatively simple next red. He refused to take the red and instead played a safety shot, which arguably cost him the frame. Writing in The Guardian, Simon Hattenstone said, "It was incredible. This was a shot that both defined and transcended sport. It was everything we'd learned about sportsmanship at school (if we had decent teachers). But it was also about the best of humanity – morality, bravery, sacrifice and sheer bloody goodness." Resuming at 8‍–‍8 in the third session, O'Sullivan made a 136 break before Bingham levelled again with a 63. Bingham took four of the next five frames to win the match 13‍–‍10. The victory was only his fourth against O'Sullivan in 22 meetings. An emotional Bingham said, "I've had a little cry at the back there [...] I don't know how I held myself together".

==== Semi-finals ====
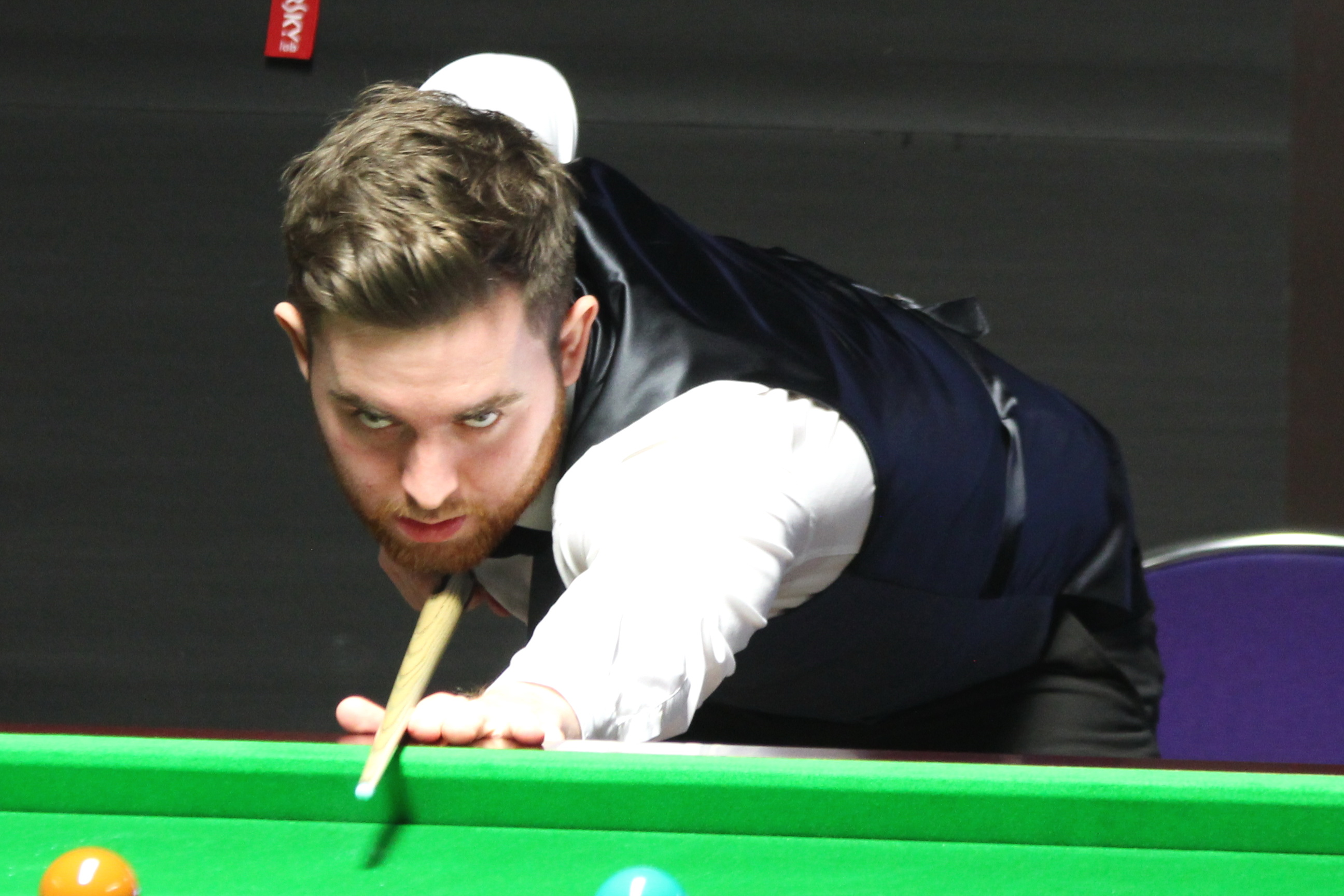
Jak Jones (pictured in 2016) reached his first ranking event final, after defeating Stuart Bingham 17‍–‍12.

The semi-finals took place from 2 to 4 May, both matches played as the best of 33 frames over four sessions. Three of the four semi-finalists were qualifiers, for the first time since 1977. The only remaining seeded player, Kyren Wilson, played David Gilbert in the first semi-final. The pair tied their opening session at 4‍–‍4, with Gilbert making breaks of 91 and 104. In the eighth frame, Wilson attempted a maximum break but missed a pot on 88. During the break, Wilson said, "thank god Mark Selby is out", alluding to the fact he had made a maximum the previous year but split the prize money with Selby. The pair's second session ended at 8‍–‍8 and they both made half-century breaks in the third session to tie again at 9‍–‍9. Wilson then won five frames in a row, including breaks of 93, 51, and 88, before Gilbert won the final frame of the session with a break of 101. Resuming 10‍–‍14 behind, Gilbert won frame 25 with a break of 70. Needing foul shots from laying snookers, Gilbert was able to get the required points but was still unable to win frame 26. Wilson won frame 27 with a break of 54 and won the next frame, after Gilbert broke down on a 49 break, to win the match 17‍–‍11. Wilson commented that he was "chuffed" having a lead after the third session and Gilbert thought he "had a bit of a shocker" and that Wilson "deserved to win" despite thinking he would win the match.

Jak Jones was playing in his first World Championship semi-final, having made his Crucible debut the previous year, and Stuart Bingham was playing in his third. Bingham won all three of the opening three frames of the match but missed frame ball in the fourth as Jones recovered to 1‍–‍3. Jones also won the next two frames before Bingham won frame seven, and Jones tied the match at 4‍–‍4. Bingham made breaks of 79 and 107 to lead 6‍–‍4, but Jones won three frames to lead the match before Bingham won frame 14. After Jones won frame 15, he was placed into a snooker and missed escaping seven times. Bingham made a clearance to tie the score 8‍–‍8. Bingham won frame 17, but Jones won all of the next six frames to lead 13‍–‍9. Bingham won frame 23, but their final frame of the third session was postponed as the session ran over. Bingham won a 40-minute 24th frame but missed a pot on the green ball in frame 25 to allow Jones to lead 14‍–‍11. Jones won the next frame with a break of 65, and Bingham won the next frame which lasted almost 45 minutes. The four frames of the mini-session lasted almost two and a half hours. After the interval, Jones made breaks of 70, 44, and 58 to win the next two frames and the match 17‍–‍12. Despite winning, Jones commented that he had not played well, and Bingham stated that he himself "must have given eight frames away".

==== Final ====
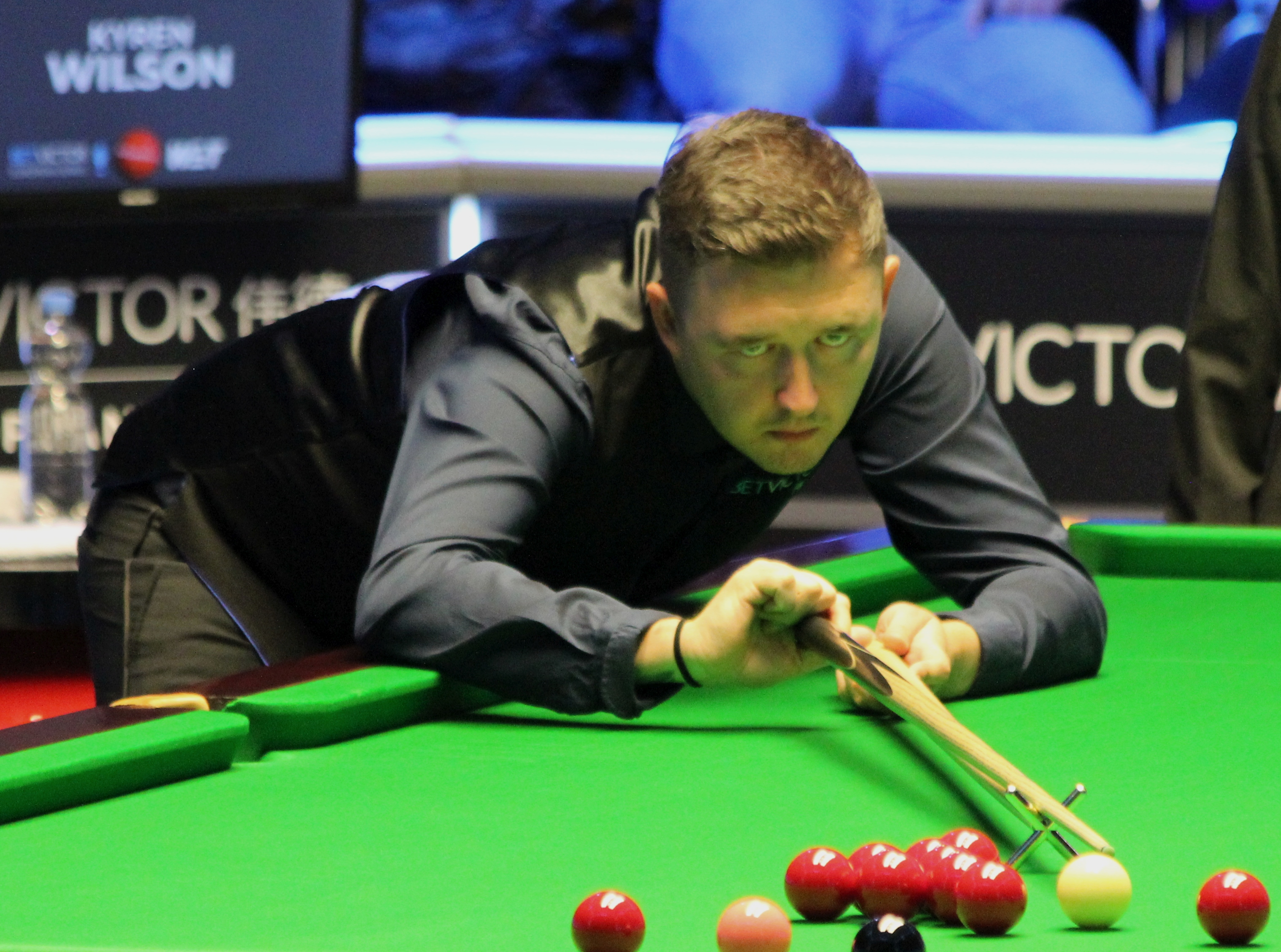
Kyren Wilson (pictured in 2022) won his first World Championship, defeating Jak Jones 18–14 in the final.

The final took place on 5 and 6 May, as the best of 35 frames played over four sessions. This was Kyren Wilson's third Triple Crown final; he had previously finished runner-up at the 2018 Masters and the 2020 World Snooker Championship, losing to Mark Allen and Ronnie O'Sullivan, respectively. Qualifier Jak Jones was appearing in his first ranking final, his previous best being a semi-final appearance at the 2022 Gibraltar Open. He was the ninth qualifier to reach the final of the World Championship and the first since Ding Junhui in 2016. Referee Paul Collier was officiating his last match before retiring from refereeing to focus on his role as a tournament director.

Wilson made a break of 129 in the opening frame and scored further breaks of 52 and 66 to lead 4‍–‍0. He made a break of 52 in frame five before compiling a 125 century in frame six and a 90 in frame seven to lead 7‍–‍0. This was the first time since 1991 that one of the finalists had won all of the first seven frames. Jones then made a break of 65 to win the concluding frame of the first session. Trailing by six frames, Jones made breaks of 75 and 56 to trail 3‍–‍7. Wilson won frame 11 with a century break and took the next frame with a break of 60. Jones won frame 13 after Wilson missed a pot, but a 122 break from Wilson in frame 14 brought the score to 10‍–‍4. Jones won the next frame and made a sufficient break in the final frame of the session to leave Wilson requiring a snooker to win. He successfully laid the snooker, and the frame concluded with shots on the black ball. Jones attempted a double but left the black available, and Wilson potted it to lead 11‍–‍6 after the second session. Wilson commented: "Jak [Jones] played really well tonight. It's not all about the scoreline, it's about how the frame was won and there was obviously a lot of tension in there."

Jones won the first two frames of the third session with breaks of 64 and 59 to trail 8‍–‍11, but Wilson won frame 20 with a 50 break and took the next frame after Jones played a poor break-off shot. Wilson missed a shot on the black in frame 22, allowing Jones to make a break of 90, which he followed with a break of 73 in the next to trail again by three frames. Wilson made a break of 87 in frame 24 and capitalised on a missed pot on the yellow by Jones to lead 15‍–‍10 after the third session. Wilson won the first frame of the final session before Jones made his first century break of the match, a 105, in frame 27. Wilson was 27 points ahead in the next frame but snookered himself on the yellow ball, and Jones made a clearance, forcing a re-spotted black. Jones missed the black over the yellow pocket before Wilson fluked the black to lead 17‍–‍11. Jones made a break of 67 in frame 29 to trail 12‍–‍17; he attempted a maximum break in the next frame, but it ended on 96, and he also won frame 31. Wilson then took frame 32 to complete an 18‍–‍14 victory, securing his first world title.

== Main draw ==
The draw for the main tournament is shown below. The numbers in parentheses after the players' names denote the seedings for the 16 seeded players (1–16) and the rankings (in italics) for the unseeded players. The match winners are shown in bold.

**Round 1 (Last 32)**; Best of 19 frames
20 April
Luca Brecel (BEL) (1)	9
**David Gilbert (ENG) (31)**	**10**
22 & 23 April
**Robert Milkins (ENG) (16)**	**10**
Pang Junxu (CHN) (27)	9
20 & 21 April
Ali Carter (ENG) (9)	7
**Stephen Maguire (SCO) (28)**	**10**
21 & 22 April
**Shaun Murphy (ENG) (8)**	**10**
Lyu Haotian (CHN) (26)	5
21 & 22 April
Mark Selby (ENG) (5)	6
**Joe O'Connor (ENG) (30)**	**10**
23 & 24 April
**Kyren Wilson (ENG) (12)**	**10**
Dominic Dale (WAL) (40)	1
24 & 25 April
**John Higgins (SCO) (13)**	**10**
Jamie Jones (WAL) (41)	6
23 & 24 April
**Mark Allen (NIR) (4)**	**10**
Robbie Williams (ENG) (45)	6
20 & 21 April
**Judd Trump (ENG) (3)**	**10**
Hossein Vafaei (IRN) (19)	5
20 & 21 April
**Tom Ford (ENG) (14)**	**10**
Ricky Walden (ENG) (32)	6
20 & 21 April
Zhang Anda (CHN) (11)	4
**Jak Jones (WAL) (44)**	**10**
22 & 23 April
Mark Williams (WAL) (6)	9
**Si Jiahui (CHN) (23)**	**10**
23 & 24 April
Ding Junhui (CHN) (7)	9
**Jack Lisowski (ENG) (17)**	**10**
22 April
Gary Wilson (ENG) (10)	5
**Stuart Bingham (ENG) (29)**	**10**
23 & 24 April
Barry Hawkins (ENG) (15)	8
**Ryan Day (WAL) (18)**	**10**
24 & 25 April
**Ronnie O'Sullivan (ENG) (2)**	**10**
Jackson Page (WAL) (43)	1

**Round 2 (Last 16)**; Best of 25 frames
25 & 26 April
**(England) David Gilbert (31)**	**13**
(England) Robert Milkins (16)	4
26, 27 & 28 April
**(Scotland) Stephen Maguire (28)**	**13**
(England) Shaun Murphy (8)	9
27, 28 & 29 April
(England) Joe O'Connor (30)	6
**(England) Kyren Wilson (12)**	**13**
27, 28 & 29 April
**(Scotland) John Higgins (13)**	**13**
(Northern Ireland) Mark Allen (4)	12
25, 26 & 27 April
**(England) Judd Trump (3)**	**13**
(England) Tom Ford (14)	7
26 & 27 April
**(Wales) Jak Jones (44)**	**13**
(China) Si Jiahui (23)	9
27, 28 & 29 April
(England) Jack Lisowski (17)	11
**(England) Stuart Bingham (29)**	**13**
28 & 29 April
(Wales) Ryan Day (18)	7
**(England) Ronnie O'Sullivan (2)**	**13**

**Quarter-finals**; Best of 25 frames
30 April & 1 May
**(England) David Gilbert (31)**	**13**
(Scotland) Stephen Maguire (28)	8
30 April & 1 May
**(England) Kyren Wilson (12)**	**13**
(Scotland) John Higgins (13)	8
30 April & 1 May
(England) Judd Trump (3)	9
**(Wales) Jak Jones (44)**	**13**
30 April & 1 May
**(England) Stuart Bingham (29)**	**13**
(England) Ronnie O'Sullivan (2)	10

**Semi-finals**; Best of 33 frames
2, 3 & 4 May
(England) David Gilbert (31)	11
**(England) Kyren Wilson (12)**	**17**
2, 3 & 4 May
**(Wales) Jak Jones (44)**	**17**
(England) Stuart Bingham (29)	12

**Final**; Best of 35 frames
5 & 6 May
**(England) Kyren Wilson (12)**	**18**
(Wales) Jak Jones (44)	14

=== Final ===
Final: (Best of 35 frames) Crucible Theatre, Sheffield, 5 & 6 May 2024; Referee: Paul Collier
**Kyren Wilson** (12); England				**18**–14			Jak Jones (44); Wales			
Session 1: **7**–1 (**7**–1)
Frame	1	2	3	4	5	6	7	8	9	10
Wilson	**129**† (129)	**87**† (52)	**76**†	**109**† (66)	**84**† (62)	**125**† (125)	**90**† (90)	11	N/A	N/A
Jones	0	35	14	7	0	4	11	**72**† (65)	N/A	N/A
Session 2: 4–**5** (**11**–6)
Frame	1	2	3	4	5	6	7	8	9	10
Wilson	18	0	**129**† (125)	**78**† (60)	22	**122**† (122)	32	0	**66**†	N/A
Jones	**75**† (75)	**80**† (52)	0	41	**74**†	0	**68**†	**90**† (90)	64 (64)	N/A
Session 3: 4–4 (**15**–10)
Frame	1	2	3	4	5	6	7	8	9	10
Wilson	39	0	**67**† (50)	**83**† (83)	23	22	**106**† (87)	**81**†	N/A	N/A
Jones	**72**† (64)	**67**† (59)	7	0	**105**† (90)	**74**† (73)	1	9	N/A	N/A
Session 4: 3–**4** (**18**–14)
Frame	1	2	3	4	5	6	7	8	9	10
Wilson	**67**†	16	**80**†	8	0	22	**71**†	N/A	N/A	N/A
Jones	35	**105**† (105)	73	**88**† (67)	**96**† (96)	**82**†	4	N/A	N/A	N/A
**129**				Highest break			105			
**4**				Century breaks			1			
12				50+ breaks			12			
(England) Kyren Wilson wins the 2024 Cazoo World Snooker Championship † = Winner of frame

== Qualifying draw ==
The draw for the qualifying rounds is shown below. The numbers in parentheses after the players' names denote the world ranking position for each player; an "a" indicates amateur players not on the main tour (i.e. without a world ranking). The match winners are shown in bold.

**Round 1 (Last 144)**; Best of 19 frames
Martin Gould (ENG) (81) (Note: Martin Gould withdrew, so Jimmy White received a walkover.)	w/d
**Jimmy White** (ENG) (119)	**w/o**
Ryan Thomerson (AUS) (112)	3
**Liam Davies (WAL) (a)**	**10**
**Ian Burns (ENG) (96)**	**10**
Dean Young (SCO) (116)	1
Andy Lee (HKG) (97)	9
**Andrew Pagett (WAL) (114)**	**10**
**Rory Thor (MAS) (104)**	**10**
Hamza Ilyas (PAK) (a)	2
**Ross Muir (SCO) (89)**	**10**
Cheung Ka Wai (HKG) (a)	9
**Alfie Burden (ENG) (105)**	**10**
Rebecca Kenna (ENG) (126)	1
Ishpreet Singh Chadha (IND) (88)	6
**Gao Yang (CHN) (a)**	**10**
Sean O'Sullivan (ENG) (85)	8
**Bulcsú Révész (HUN) (a)**	**10**
**Andres Petrov (EST) (108)**	**10**
Ahmed Aly Elsayed (USA) (124)	1
**Adam Duffy (ENG) (92)**	**10**
Mink Nutcharut (THA) (117)	5
**Andrew Higginson (ENG) (101)**	**10**
Duane Jones (WAL) (a)	7
**Louis Heathcote (ENG) (100)**	**10**
Oliver Sykes (ENG) (a)	4
**Stuart Carrington (ENG) (93)**	**10**
Himanshu Jain (IND) (118)	5
**Alexander Ursenbacher (SUI) (109)**	**10**
Iulian Boiko (UKR) (a)	0
**Allan Taylor (ENG) (84)**	**10**
Vladislav Gradinari (MDA) (a)	6
**Marco Fu (HKG) (83)**	**10**
Baipat Siripaporn (THA) (125)	1
**Jiang Jun (CHN) (110)**	**10**
Amir Sarkhosh (IRN) (a)	6
Hammad Miah (ENG) (94)	2
**Haydon Pinhey (ENG) (a)**	**10**
Muhammad Asif (PAK) (99) (Note: Muhammad Asif withdrew, so Daniel Womersley received a walkover.)	w/d
**Daniel Womersley** (ENG) (a)	**w/o**
**Ma Hailong (CHN) (102)**	**10**
Victor Sarkis (BRA) (122)	1
**Oliver Brown (ENG) (91)**	**10**
Reanne Evans (ENG) (120)	0
Fergal O'Brien (IRL) (107)	8
**Mostafa Dorgham (EGY) (123)**	**10**
**Long Zehuang (CHN) (86)**	**10**
Sydney Wilson (ENG) (a)	1
**Rod Lawler (ENG) (87)**	**10**
Gong Chenzhi (CHN) (a)	7
Stan Moody (ENG) (106)	6
**Mohammed Shehab (UAE) (a)**	**10**
**Xing Zihao (CHN) (90)**	**10**
Michael Holt (ENG) (a)	6
**Jenson Kendrick (ENG) (103)**	**10**
Bai Yulu (CHN) (a)	7
**Liam Pullen (ENG) (98)**	**10**
Anton Kazakov (UKR) (113)	3
**Peng Yisong (CHN) (95)**	**10**
Manasawin Phetmalaikul (THA) (121)	5
Mohamed Ibrahim (EGY) (111)	6
**Peter Lines (ENG) (a)**	**10**
**Ashley Carty (ENG) (82)**	**10**
Liam Graham (SCO) (115)	4

**Round 2 (Last 112)**; Best of 19 frames
**Liu Hongyu (CHN) (80)**	**10**
Jimmy White (ENG) (119)	3
**Jimmy Robertson (ENG) (49)**	**10**
Liam Davies (WAL) (a)	2
Mark Joyce (ENG) (65)	7
**Ian Burns (ENG) (96)**	**10**
**Mark Davis (ENG) (64)**	**10**
Andrew Pagett (WAL) (114)	2
**David Grace (ENG) (57)**	**10**
Rory Thor (MAS) (104)	8
**He Guoqiang (CHN) (72)**	**10**
Ross Muir (SCO) (89)	8
Xu Si (CHN) (56)	3
**Alfie Burden (ENG) (105)**	**10**
**Zak Surety (ENG) (73)**	**10**
Gao Yang (CHN) (a)	6
**James Cahill (ENG) (76)**	**10**
Bulcsú Révész (HUN) (a)	8
**Jamie Clarke (WAL) (53)**	**10**
Andres Petrov (EST) (108)	7
**Ashley Hugill (ENG) (69)**	**10**
Adam Duffy (ENG) (92)	4
**Michael White (WAL) (60)**	**10**
Andrew Higginson (ENG) (101)	8
Oliver Lines (ENG) (61)	7
**Louis Heathcote (ENG) (100)**	**10**
Liam Highfield (ENG) (68)	9
**Stuart Carrington (ENG) (93)**	**10**
**Anthony Hamilton (ENG) (52)**	**10**
Alexander Ursenbacher (SUI) (109)	7
**Lukas Kleckers (GER) (77)**	**10**
Allan Taylor (ENG) (84)	9
Ken Doherty (IRL) (78)	6
**Marco Fu (HKG) (83)**	**10**
Fan Zhengyi (CHN) (51)	8
**Jiang Jun (CHN) (110)**	**10**
**Julien Leclercq (BEL) (67)**	**10**
Haydon Pinhey (ENG) (a)	3
**Aaron Hill (IRL) (62)**	**10**
Daniel Womersley (ENG) (a)	3
Martin O'Donnell (ENG) (59)	7
**Ma Hailong (CHN) (102)**	**10**
Dylan Emery (WAL) (70)	8
**Oliver Brown (ENG) (91)**	**10**
**Graeme Dott (SCO) (54)**	**10**
Mostafa Dorgham (EGY) (123)	5
**Andy Hicks (ENG) (75)**	**10**
Long Zehuang (CHN) (86)	2
**Ben Mertens (BEL) (74)**	**10**
Rod Lawler (ENG) (87)	9
**Tian Pengfei (CHN) (55)**	**10**
Mohammed Shehab (UAE) (a)	8
**Daniel Wells (WAL) (71)**	**10**
Xing Zihao (CHN) (90)	5
Ben Woollaston (ENG) (58)	8
**Jenson Kendrick (ENG) (103)**	**10**
**Sanderson Lam (ENG) (63)**	**10**
Liam Pullen (ENG) (98)	8
**David Lilley (ENG) (66)**	**10**
Peng Yisong (CHN) (95)	9
**Scott Donaldson (SCO) (50)**	**10**
Peter Lines (ENG) (a)	6
**John Astley (ENG) (79)**	**10**
Ashley Carty (ENG) (82)	6

**Round 3 (Last 80)**; Best of 19 frames
**Jack Lisowski (ENG) (17)**	**10**
Liu Hongyu (CHN) (80)	4
**Matthew Stevens (WAL) (48)**	**10**
Jimmy Robertson (ENG) (49)	6
**Ricky Walden (ENG) (32)**	**10**
Ian Burns (ENG) (96)	7
Thepchaiya Un-Nooh (THA) (33)	8
**Mark Davis (ENG) (64)**	**10**
**Dominic Dale (WAL) (40)**	**10**
David Grace (ENG) (57)	6
Anthony McGill (SCO) (25)	5
**He Guoqiang (CHN) (72)**	**10**
**Jamie Jones (WAL) (41)**	**10**
Alfie Burden (ENG) (105)	5
**Neil Robertson (AUS) (24)**	**10**
Zak Surety (ENG) (73)	2
**Zhou Yuelong (CHN) (21)**	**10**
James Cahill (ENG) (76)	0
**Jak Jones (WAL) (44)**	**10**
Jamie Clarke (WAL) (53)	6
**Stephen Maguire (SCO) (28)**	**10**
Ashley Hugill (ENG) (69)	7
**Yuan Sijun (CHN) (37)**	**10**
Michael White (WAL) (60)	8
Elliot Slessor (ENG) (36)	8
**Louis Heathcote (ENG) (100)**	**10**
**Stuart Bingham (ENG) (29)**	**10**
Stuart Carrington (ENG) (93)	9
**Robbie Williams (ENG) (45)**	**10**
Anthony Hamilton (ENG) (52)	5
**Chris Wakelin (ENG) (20)**	**10**
Lukas Kleckers (GER) (77)	5
**Hossein Vafaei (IRN) (19)**	**10**
Marco Fu (HKG) (83)	4
Sam Craigie (ENG) (46)	8
**Jiang Jun (CHN) (110)**	**10**
**Joe O'Connor (ENG) (30)**	**10**
Julien Leclercq (BEL) (67)	1
**Matthew Selt (ENG) (35)**	**10**
Aaron Hill (IRL) (62)	4
**Cao Yupeng (CHN) (38)**	**10**
Ma Hailong (CHN) (102)	4
**Pang Junxu (CHN) (27)**	**10**
Oliver Brown (ENG) (91)	7
**Jackson Page (WAL) (43)**	**10**
Graeme Dott (SCO) (54)	5
**Noppon Saengkham (THA) (22)**	**10**
Andy Hicks (ENG) (75)	5
**Si Jiahui (CHN) (23)**	**10**
Ben Mertens (BEL) (74)	9
**Wu Yize (CHN) (42)**	**10**
Tian Pengfei (CHN) (55)	8
**Lyu Haotian (CHN) (26)**	**10**
Daniel Wells (WAL) (71)	8
Jordan Brown (NIR) (39)	5
**Jenson Kendrick (ENG) (103)**	**10**
**Xiao Guodong (CHN) (34)**	**10**
Sanderson Lam (ENG) (63)	2
**David Gilbert (ENG) (31)**	**10**
David Lilley (ENG) (66)	4
Joe Perry (ENG) (47)	6
**Scott Donaldson (SCO) (50)**	**10**
**Ryan Day (WAL) (18)**	**10**
John Astley (ENG) (79)	6

**Round 4 (Last 48)**; Best of 19 frames
**(England) Jack Lisowski (17)**	**10**
(Wales) Matthew Stevens (48)	3
**(England) Ricky Walden (32)**	**10**
(England) Mark Davis (64)	9
**(Wales) Dominic Dale (40)**	**10**
(China) He Guoqiang (72)	8
**(Wales) Jamie Jones (41)**	**10**
(Australia) Neil Robertson (24)	9
(China) Zhou Yuelong (21)	4
**(Wales) Jak Jones (44)**	**10**
**(Scotland) Stephen Maguire (28)**	**10**
(China) Yuan Sijun (37)	6
(England) Louis Heathcote (100)	8
**(England) Stuart Bingham (29)**	**10**
**(England) Robbie Williams (45)**	**10**
(England) Chris Wakelin (20)	9
**(Iran) Hossein Vafaei (19)**	**10**
(China) Jiang Jun (110)	5
**(England) Joe O'Connor (30)**	**10**
(England) Matthew Selt (35)	8
(China) Cao Yupeng (38)	8
**(China) Pang Junxu (27)**	**10**
**(Wales) Jackson Page (43)**	**10**
(Thailand) Noppon Saengkham (22)	9
**(China) Si Jiahui (23)**	**10**
(China) Wu Yize (42)	4
**(China) Lyu Haotian (26)**	**10**
(England) Jenson Kendrick (103)	7
(China) Xiao Guodong (34)	6
**(England) David Gilbert (31)**	**10**
(Scotland) Scott Donaldson (50)	9
**(Wales) Ryan Day (18)**	**10**

Note: w/o = walkover; w/d = withdrawn

== Century breaks ==
=== Main stage centuries ===
A total of 63 century breaks were made during the main stage of the tournament.

- 142 – Jackson Page
- 142 – Ricky Walden
- 142 – Mark Williams
- 138 – Hossein Vafaei
- 136, 130, 130, 129, 123, 115, 110, 106, 104, 101 – David Gilbert
- 136, 123, 122, 116 – Ronnie O'Sullivan
- 134, 127, 114, 111 – Stephen Maguire
- 134, 104 – Luca Brecel
- 131, 127 – Ding Junhui
- 129, 125, 125, 123, 122, 121, 105, 101 – Kyren Wilson
- 129, 102 – John Higgins
- 125, 117, 108, 107, 104, 104 – Stuart Bingham
- 123 – Jack Lisowski
- 122, 102, 101 – Joe O'Connor
- 120 – Dominic Dale
- 119, 114 – Mark Allen
- 118 – Jamie Jones
- 117, 106, 105 – Jak Jones
- 117 – Lyu Haotian
- 115, 110 – Ryan Day
- 112 – Mark Selby
- 111 – Shaun Murphy
- 110, 107, 107 – Judd Trump
- 108 – Barry Hawkins
- 105 – Robbie Williams

=== Qualifying stage centuries ===
A total of 122 century breaks were made during the qualifying rounds.

- 147, 128, 112 – Noppon Saengkham
- 144, 131 – Wu Yize
- 143, 110 – Scott Donaldson
- 142, 137, 104, 104, 100, 100 – Jack Lisowski
- 141, 113 – Mark Joyce
- 140 – Xing Zihao
- 136, 119, 102, 102, 100 – Ryan Day
- 136, 104, 102 – Marco Fu
- 135, 135 – Matthew Stevens
- 135, 126 – Stuart Bingham
- 135, 101 – Jamie Jones
- 135 – Gao Yang
- 135 – Peter Lines
- 135 – Liu Hongyu
- 134, 117, 104, 103, 103 – Neil Robertson
- 133, 120, 117 – David Gilbert
- 133, 113 – Alfie Burden
- 132 – Robbie Williams
- 131, 118, 102 – Jiang Jun
- 130, 127, 100 – Mark Davis
- 130 – Alexander Ursenbacher
- 129, 126, 125, 118, 110, 104, 100 – Louis Heathcote
- 128 – Ian Burns
- 128 – Ashley Hugill
- 127, 116 – Cao Yupeng
- 127 – Zak Surety
- 126, 102 – Chris Wakelin
- 126 – Jak Jones
- 125, 104 – Graeme Dott
- 124, 119 – Ben Mertens
- 123, 101 – Ben Woollaston
- 121, 120, 116 – Hossein Vafaei
- 121, 117 – Lyu Haotian
- 121, 109, 107 – Jackson Page
- 121 – Andy Hicks
- 117, 113 – Joe O'Connor
- 117, 112, 110 – Si Jiahui
- 116, 104 – Daniel Wells
- 116 – Mohammed Shehab
- 115, 106 – Fan Zhengyi
- 115 – Rory Thor
- 114, 110, 106, 104, 100 – Stephen Maguire
- 114 – Sean O'Sullivan
- 114 – Tian Pengfei
- 113, 104 – Yuan Sijun
- 113 – Stuart Carrington
- 112 – Andrew Higginson
- 111, 102 – Jenson Kendrick
- 109, 100 – Peng Yisong
- 108 – James Cahill
- 108 – Liam Pullen
- 107 – Liam Davies
- 105 – Ashley Carty
- 105 – Ishpreet Singh Chadha
- 105 – Dominic Dale
- 105 – Xiao Guodong
- 104 – Jamie Clarke
- 104 – Duane Jones
- 103 – Pang Junxu
- 102 – Manasawin Phetmalaikul
- 101 – Sam Craigie
- 100 – Oliver Brown
- 100 – Amir Sarkhosh
- 100 – Zhou Yuelong
