= 2024 Championship League (invitational) =

Professional snooker tournament

2024 BetVictor Championship League Invitational

Tournament information
- Dates: 2 January – 13 March 2024
- Venue: Leicester Arena
- City: Leicester
- Country: England
- Organisation: Matchroom Sport
- Format: Non-ranking event
- Total prize fund: £205,000
- Winner's share: £10,000 (plus bonuses)
- Highest break: Kyren Wilson (ENG) (147); John Higgins (SCO) (147); Joe O'Connor (ENG) (147)

Final
- Champion: Mark Selby (ENG)
- Runner-up: Joe O'Connor (ENG)
- Score: 3–1

The 2024 Championship League Invitational (officially the 2024 BetVictor Championship League Invitational) was a professional non‑ranking snooker tournament, which took place from 2 January 2024 to 13 March 2024 at the Leicester Arena in Leicester, England.

John Higgins was the defending champion, having won the tournament for the fourth time after beating Judd Trump 3‍–‍1 in the final of the 2023 event. He was defeated 3‍–‍0 by Joe O'Connor in the Winners' Group semi‑finals.

There were three maximum breaks achieved during the tournament, by Kyren Wilson in Group 3, by John Higgins in Group 5, and by Joe O'Connor in Group 7. This is only the third time that three maximums have been made in an event, the first being at the 2012 UK Championship, and the second at the 2017 German Masters.

Mark Selby won the tournament, beating Joe O'Connor 3‍–‍1 in the final.

== Format ==
A total of 25 players were initially invited to the event, with the matches played behind closed doors without an audience. Players earned prize money for every frame won, as well as being semi‑finalists, runner‑up, and winner of each group, with more money involved in the Winners' Group. Since 2010, all matches were played as the best of five frames.

The tournament was played in a round‑robin format, consisted of eight groups of seven players. The top four players in each group qualified for a play‑off, with the winner entering the Winners' Group. The bottom two players in each group were eliminated, and the remaining four moved to the next group, where they were joined by three more players. This format was played for each group, from one to seven. In each group, the players were ranked by the number of matches won, then by most frames won, and then by least frames lost. If two players were tied by these criteria, the player who won the match between them was ranked higher in the table. The group play‑off semi‑finals were contested between the 1st and 4th place players in the table, and between the 2nd and 3rd place players in the table. The Winners' Group was played at the end, and its play‑off winner became champion of the tournament.

Groups 1 and 2 were played from 2 to 5 January. Groups 3, 4, and 5 were played from 5 to 10 February. Groups 6 and 7 were played from 26 to 29 February, and the Winners' Group was played on 12 and 13 March. The champion takes a place in the Champion of Champions.

The event was broadcast by DAZN in Germany, Spain, the United States and Brazil; Fox Sports in Australia; Nova in Czechia and Slovakia; Premier in the Philippines; Rigour Media in China; Viaplay in the Baltics, Iceland and the Netherlands; Viasat in Scandinavia; and by Matchroom.live in all other territories. It was also streamed live on the Matchroom‑Multi‑Sport YouTube channel.

=== Withdrawals ===
There were a number of players who were originally invited to participate, who withdrew and were replaced by others. Most notable among these were Mark Allen, Zhang Anda, Zhou Yuelong, Hossein Vafaei, Jack Lisowski, Judd Trump, and Si Jiahui. There were other changes as players moved between groups, as noted in the group sections below.

=== Prize fund ===
The breakdown of prize money for the 2024 Championship League is as follows:

- Groups 1–7
  - Winner: £3,000
  - Runner-up: £2,000
  - Semi-final: £1,000
  - Frame-win (league stage): £100
  - Frame-win (play-offs): £300
  - Highest break: £500
- Winners' Group
  - Winner: £10,000
  - Runner-up: £5,000
  - Semi-final: £3,000
  - Frame-win (league stage): £200
  - Frame-win (play-offs): £300
  - Highest break: £1,000
- Maximum possible tournament total: £205,000 (if all match results are 3‍–‍2)
- Minimum possible tournament total: £152,800 (if all match results are 3‍–‍0)

== Group 1 ==
Group 1 was played on 2 and 3 January 2024. There were 19 century breaks made in Group 1, the highest being 140 made by both Chris Wakelin and Kyren Wilson. Stuart Bingham won the group and qualified for the Winners' Group.

=== Group 1 league matches ===
==== 2 January ====
- Kyren Wilson 3–0 Stuart Bingham
- Ryan Day 3–2 Gary Wilson
- Kyren Wilson 3–0 Chris Wakelin
- Robert Milkins 0–3 Noppon Saengkham
- Ryan Day 3–1 Stuart Bingham
- Chris Wakelin 3–2 Noppon Saengkham
- Kyren Wilson 1–3 Ryan Day
- Robert Milkins 1–3 Gary Wilson
- Ryan Day 3–2 Chris Wakelin
- Stuart Bingham 3–2 Gary Wilson
- Robert Milkins 0–3 Chris Wakelin
- Kyren Wilson 3–2 Noppon Saengkham

==== 3 January ====
- Robert Milkins 1–3 Stuart Bingham
- Gary Wilson 3–2 Noppon Saengkham
- Robert Milkins 3–2 Ryan Day
- Gary Wilson 3–2 Chris Wakelin
- Ryan Day 3–2 Noppon Saengkham
- Chris Wakelin 2–3 Stuart Bingham
- Kyren Wilson 3–1 Robert Milkins
- Stuart Bingham 3–2 Noppon Saengkham
- Kyren Wilson 3–2 Gary Wilson

=== Group 1 table ===
Pos	Player	Pld	W	L	FF	FA	FD	
1	Ryan Day (WAL)	6	5	1	17	11	+6	Qualification to Group 1 play-off
2	Kyren Wilson (ENG)	6	5	1	16	8	+8	Qualification to Group 1 play-off
3	Stuart Bingham (ENG) (W)	6	4	2	13	13	0	Qualification to Group 1 play-off
4	Gary Wilson (ENG)	6	3	3	15	14	+1	Qualification to Group 1 play-off
5	Chris Wakelin (ENG)	6	2	4	12	14	−2	Advanced into Group 2
6	Noppon Saengkham (THA)	6	1	5	13	15	−2	Eliminated from the competition
7	Robert Milkins (ENG)	6	1	5	6	17	−11	Eliminated from the competition

Source: Group 1 results from snooker.org and championshipleaguesnooker.co.uk
(W) Group winner

=== Group 1 play-offs ===
Semi-finals; Best of 5 frames
Ryan Day (WAL)	2
Gary Wilson (ENG)	3
Kyren Wilson (ENG)	0
Stuart Bingham (ENG)	3

Final; Best of 5 frames
Gary Wilson (ENG)	0
Stuart Bingham (ENG)	3

== Group 2 ==
Group 2 was played on 4 and 5 January 2024. There were 17 century breaks made in Group 2, the highest being 142 made by Ali Carter. Chris Wakelin won the group and qualified for the Winners' Group.

Note: Matthew Selt moved from Group 5 to Group 2.

=== Group 2 league matches ===
==== 4 January ====
- Mark Selby 1–3 Kyren Wilson
- Ali Carter 3–0 Gary Wilson
- Mark Selby 3–1 Ryan Day
- Chris Wakelin 3–0 Matthew Selt
- Gary Wilson 3–0 Ryan Day
- Kyren Wilson 3–1 Matthew Selt
- Mark Selby 1–3 Matthew Selt
- Ali Carter 0–3 Chris Wakelin
- Ryan Day 2–3 Matthew Selt
- Kyren Wilson 3–0 Chris Wakelin
- Ali Carter 3–0 Ryan Day
- Mark Selby 3–1 Gary Wilson

==== 5 January ====
- Kyren Wilson 1–3 Ali Carter
- Gary Wilson 2–3 Chris Wakelin
- Ali Carter 3–2 Matthew Selt
- Ryan Day 2–3 Chris Wakelin
- Gary Wilson 3–0 Matthew Selt
- Kyren Wilson 3–1 Ryan Day
- Mark Selby 3–0 Ali Carter
- Mark Selby 3–1 Chris Wakelin
- Kyren Wilson 0–3 Gary Wilson

=== Group 2 table ===
Pos	Player	Pld	W	L	FF	FA	FD	
1	Mark Selby (ENG)	6	4	2	14	9	+5	Qualification to Group 2 play-off
2	Kyren Wilson (ENG)	6	4	2	13	9	+4	Qualification to Group 2 play-off
3	Chris Wakelin (ENG) (W)	6	4	2	13	10	+3	Qualification to Group 2 play-off
4	Ali Carter (ENG)	6	4	2	12	9	+3	Qualification to Group 2 play-off
5	Gary Wilson (ENG)	6	3	3	12	9	+3	Advanced into Group 3
6	Matthew Selt (ENG)	6	2	4	9	15	−6	Eliminated from the competition
7	Ryan Day (WAL)	6	0	6	6	18	−12	Eliminated from the competition

Source: Group 2 results from snooker.org and championshipleaguesnooker.co.uk
(W) Group winner

=== Group 2 play-offs ===
Semi-finals; Best of 5 frames
Mark Selby (ENG)	3
Ali Carter (ENG)	1
Kyren Wilson (ENG)	1
Chris Wakelin (ENG)	3

Final; Best of 5 frames
Mark Selby (ENG)	2
Chris Wakelin (ENG)	3

== Group 3 ==
Group 3 was played on 5 and 6 February 2024. There were 26 century breaks made in Group 3, the highest being 147 made by Kyren Wilson in his league match against Tom Ford, the fifth maximum break of his career. Mark Selby won the group and qualified for the Winners' Group.

Note: John Higgins replaced Ali Carter in Group 3. Carter moved from Group 3 to Group 6.

=== Group 3 league matches ===
==== 5 February ====
- Neil Robertson 1–3 Kyren Wilson
- Mark Selby 3–2 Tom Ford
- Neil Robertson 2–3 John Higgins
- Gary Wilson 2–3 Xiao Guodong
- Mark Selby 2–3 John Higgins
- Kyren Wilson 3–0 Xiao Guodong
- Neil Robertson 3–1 Xiao Guodong
- Tom Ford 0–3 Gary Wilson
- John Higgins 2–3 Xiao Guodong
- Kyren Wilson 0–3 Gary Wilson
- John Higgins 2–3 Tom Ford
- Mark Selby 3–1 Neil Robertson

==== 6 February ====
- Kyren Wilson 3–2 Tom Ford
- Mark Selby 3–2 Gary Wilson
- Tom Ford 0–3 Xiao Guodong
- John Higgins 3–0 Gary Wilson
- Mark Selby 3–2 Xiao Guodong
- Kyren Wilson 0–3 John Higgins
- Neil Robertson 3–0 Tom Ford
- Neil Robertson 3–0 Gary Wilson
- Mark Selby 1–3 Kyren Wilson

=== Group 3 table ===
Pos	Player	Pld	W	L	FF	FA	FD	
1	John Higgins (SCO)	6	4	2	16	10	+6	Qualification to Group 3 play-off
2	Mark Selby (ENG) (W)	6	4	2	15	13	+2	Qualification to Group 3 play-off
3	Kyren Wilson (ENG)	6	4	2	12	10	+2	Qualification to Group 3 play-off
4	Neil Robertson (AUS)	6	3	3	13	10	+3	Qualification to Group 3 play-off
5	Xiao Guodong (CHN)	6	3	3	12	13	−1	Advanced into Group 4
6	Gary Wilson (ENG)	6	2	4	10	12	−2	Eliminated from the competition
7	Tom Ford (ENG)	6	1	5	7	17	−10	Eliminated from the competition

Source: Group 3 results from snooker.org and championshipleaguesnooker.co.uk
(W) Group winner

=== Group 3 play-offs ===
Semi-finals; Best of 5 frames
John Higgins (SCO)	3
Neil Robertson (AUS)	0
Mark Selby (ENG)	3
Kyren Wilson (ENG)	0

Final; Best of 5 frames
John Higgins (SCO)	0
Mark Selby (ENG)	3

== Group 4 ==
Group 4 was played on 7 and 8 February 2024. There were 18 century breaks made in Group 4, the highest being 143 made by John Higgins. Neil Robertson won the group and qualified for the Winners' Group.

=== Group 4 league matches ===
==== 7 February ====
- Kyren Wilson 3–1 Barry Hawkins
- John Higgins 3–2 Jimmy Robertson
- Neil Robertson 0–3 Barry Hawkins
- Ricky Walden 0–3 Xiao Guodong
- Neil Robertson 3–0 Jimmy Robertson
- Kyren Wilson 1–3 Xiao Guodong
- Barry Hawkins 1–3 Jimmy Robertson
- John Higgins 1–3 Ricky Walden
- Kyren Wilson 0–3 Jimmy Robertson
- Neil Robertson 3–0 John Higgins
- Kyren Wilson 3–2 Ricky Walden
- Barry Hawkins 3–1 Xiao Guodong

==== 8 February ====
- Neil Robertson 1–3 Ricky Walden
- John Higgins 3–2 Xiao Guodong
- Ricky Walden 3–0 Jimmy Robertson
- Kyren Wilson 2–3 John Higgins
- Neil Robertson 2–3 Kyren Wilson
- Jimmy Robertson 3–2 Xiao Guodong
- Barry Hawkins 3–0 Ricky Walden
- John Higgins 3–1 Barry Hawkins
- Neil Robertson 3–1 Xiao Guodong

=== Group 4 table ===
Pos	Player	Pld	W	L	FF	FA	FD	
1	John Higgins (SCO)	6	4	2	13	13	0	Qualification to Group 4 play-off
2	Barry Hawkins (ENG)	6	3	3	12	10	+2	Qualification to Group 4 play-off
3	Neil Robertson (AUS) (W)	6	3	3	12	10	+2	Qualification to Group 4 play-off
4	Kyren Wilson (ENG)	6	3	3	12	14	−2	Qualification to Group 4 play-off
5	Ricky Walden (ENG)	6	3	3	11	11	0	Advanced into Group 5
6	Jimmy Robertson (ENG)	6	3	3	11	12	−1	Eliminated from the competition
7	Xiao Guodong (CHN)	6	2	4	12	13	−1	Eliminated from the competition

Source: Group 4 results from snooker.org and championshipleaguesnooker.co.uk
(W) Group winner

Note: Barry Hawkins and Neil Robertson finished with equal points and frames after all the league matches were completed. Hawkins won the match between them and so finished above Robertson in the table.

=== Group 4 play-offs ===
Semi-finals; Best of 5 frames
John Higgins (SCO)	1
Kyren Wilson (ENG)	3
Barry Hawkins (ENG)	0
Neil Robertson (AUS)	3

Final; Best of 5 frames
Kyren Wilson (ENG)	2
Neil Robertson (AUS)	3

== Group 5 ==
Group 5 was played on 9 and 10 February 2024. There were 19 century breaks made in Group 5, the highest being 147 made by John Higgins in his semi-final match against Fan Zhengyi, the 13th maximum break of his career. Higgins won the group and qualified for the Winners' Group.

Note: Fan Zhengyi replaced Matthew Selt in Group 5. Selt moved from Group 5 to Group 2.

=== Group 5 league matches ===
==== 9 February ====
- Barry Hawkins 3–1 Joe Perry
- Fan Zhengyi 3–0 Kyren Wilson
- Ricky Walden 2–3 David Gilbert
- John Higgins 3–0 Joe Perry
- Barry Hawkins 3–0 Ricky Walden
- John Higgins 3–0 Fan Zhengyi
- Joe Perry 2–3 Fan Zhengyi
- Kyren Wilson 3–0 David Gilbert
- Barry Hawkins 3–1 Fan Zhengyi
- Kyren Wilson 3–2 John Higgins
- Barry Hawkins 3–0 David Gilbert
- Joe Perry 2–3 Ricky Walden

==== 10 February ====
- Kyren Wilson 0–3 Ricky Walden
- John Higgins 3–2 David Gilbert
- David Gilbert 2–3 Fan Zhengyi
- Kyren Wilson 2–3 Barry Hawkins
- Ricky Walden 1–3 Fan Zhengyi
- John Higgins 0–3 Barry Hawkins
- Joe Perry 0–3 David Gilbert
- John Higgins 3–2 Ricky Walden
- Kyren Wilson 2–3 Joe Perry

=== Group 5 table ===
Pos	Player	Pld	W	L	FF	FA	FD	
1	Barry Hawkins (ENG)	6	6	0	18	4	+14	Qualification to Group 5 play-off
2	John Higgins (SCO) (W)	6	4	2	14	10	+4	Qualification to Group 5 play-off
3	Fan Zhengyi (CHN)	6	4	2	13	11	+2	Qualification to Group 5 play-off
4	Ricky Walden (ENG)	6	2	4	11	14	−3	Qualification to Group 5 play-off
5	Kyren Wilson (ENG)	6	2	4	10	14	−4	Advanced into Group 6
6	David Gilbert (ENG)	6	2	4	10	14	−4	Eliminated from the competition
7	Joe Perry (ENG)	6	1	5	8	17	−9	Eliminated from the competition

Source: Group 5 results from snooker.org and championshipleaguesnooker.co.uk
(W) Group winner

Note: Kyren Wilson and David Gilbert finished with equal points and frames after all the league matches were completed. Wilson won the match between them and so finished above Gilbert in the table.

=== Group 5 play-offs ===
Semi-finals; Best of 5 frames
Barry Hawkins (ENG)	1
Ricky Walden (ENG)	3
John Higgins (SCO)	3
Fan Zhengyi (CHN)	2

Final; Best of 5 frames
Ricky Walden (ENG)	2
John Higgins (SCO)	3

== Group 6 ==
Group 6 was played on 26 and 27 February 2024. There were 15 century breaks made in Group 6, the highest being 142 made by Ricky Walden. Kyren Wilson won the group and qualified for the Winners' Group.

Note: Ali Carter replaced John Higgins in Group 6. Higgins moved from Group 6 to Group 3. Carter then withdrew and was replaced in the group by Elliot Slessor. Barry Hawkins also withdrew and was replaced by Pang Junxu.

=== Group 6 league matches ===
==== 26 February ====
- Fan Zhengyi 3–1 Elliot Slessor
- Ricky Walden 0–3 Joe O'Connor
- Kyren Wilson 3–1 Sam Craigie
- Pang Junxu 0–3 Elliot Slessor
- Kyren Wilson 3–2 Fan Zhengyi
- Pang Junxu 3–1 Joe O'Connor
- Sam Craigie 0–3 Ricky Walden
- Joe O'Connor 1–3 Elliot Slessor
- Pang Junxu 3–0 Ricky Walden
- Fan Zhengyi 1–3 Joe O'Connor
- Kyren Wilson 3–2 Elliot Slessor
- Sam Craigie 3–2 Fan Zhengyi

==== 27 February ====
- Sam Craigie 3–2 Pang Junxu
- Kyren Wilson 3–2 Ricky Walden
- Sam Craigie 3–0 Joe O'Connor
- Ricky Walden 1–3 Fan Zhengyi
- Kyren Wilson 1–3 Joe O'Connor
- Pang Junxu 3–1 Fan Zhengyi
- Elliot Slessor 1–3 Sam Craigie
- Kyren Wilson 0–3 Pang Junxu
- Elliot Slessor 3–2 Ricky Walden

=== Group 6 table ===
Pos	Player	Pld	W	L	FF	FA	FD	
1	Pang Junxu (CHN)	6	4	2	14	8	+6	Qualification to Group 6 play-off
2	Sam Craigie (ENG)	6	4	2	13	11	+2	Qualification to Group 6 play-off
3	Kyren Wilson (ENG) (W)	6	4	2	13	13	0	Qualification to Group 6 play-off
4	Elliot Slessor (ENG)	6	3	3	13	12	+1	Qualification to Group 6 play-off
5	Joe O'Connor (ENG)	6	3	3	11	11	0	Advanced into Group 7
6	Fan Zhengyi (CHN)	6	2	4	12	14	−2	Eliminated from the competition
7	Ricky Walden (ENG)	6	1	5	8	15	−7	Eliminated from the competition

Source: Group 6 results from snooker.org and championshipleaguesnooker.co.uk
(W) Group winner

=== Group 6 play-offs ===
Semi-finals; Best of 5 frames
Pang Junxu (CHN)	3
Elliot Slessor (ENG)	2
Sam Craigie (ENG)	2
Kyren Wilson (ENG)	3

Final; Best of 5 frames
Pang Junxu (CHN)	0
Kyren Wilson (ENG)	3

== Group 7 ==
Group 7 was played on 28 and 29 February 2024. There were 16 century breaks made in Group 7, the highest being 147 made by Joe O'Connor in his league match against Elliot Slessor, the first maximum break of his career and the 200th in professional snooker. O'Connor won the group and qualified for the Winners' Group.

Note: Ronnie O’Sullivan played in the first day's matches, then subsequently withdrew and did not compete further. He was not replaced by another player, and the group continued as a six-player group with the matches already played against O'Sullivan omitted.

=== Group 7 league matches ===
==== 28 February ====
- Pang Junxu 0–3 Jak Jones
- Joe O'Connor 2–3 Jordan Brown
- Joe O'Connor 3–0 Sam Craigie
- Jak Jones 3–2 Elliot Slessor
- Pang Junxu 3–2 Jordan Brown
- Jak Jones 3–0 Sam Craigie
- Pang Junxu 0–3 Elliot Slessor
- Jordan Brown 3–2 Sam Craigie

Results not counted after O'Sullivan's withdrawal:

- Ronnie O'Sullivan 3–2 Sam Craigie
- Ronnie O'Sullivan 3–2 Elliot Slessor
- Ronnie O'Sullivan 0–3 Jak Jones
- Ronnie O'Sullivan 2–3 Joe O'Connor

==== 29 February ====
- Pang Junxu 2–3 Joe O'Connor
- Jordan Brown 1–3 Elliot Slessor
- Jordan Brown 1–3 Jak Jones
- Pang Junxu 3–0 Sam Craigie
- Joe O'Connor 2–3 Jak Jones
- Elliot Slessor 3–1 Sam Craigie
- Joe O'Connor 3–2 Elliot Slessor

Matches not played:

- Ronnie O'Sullivan v Pang Junxu
- Ronnie O'Sullivan v Jordan Brown

=== Group 7 table ===
Pos	Player	Pld	W	L	FF	FA	FD	
1	Jak Jones (WAL)	5	5	0	15	5	+10	Qualification to Group 7 play-off
2	Elliot Slessor (ENG)	5	3	2	13	8	+5	Qualification to Group 7 play-off
3	Joe O'Connor (ENG) (W)	5	3	2	13	10	+3	Qualification to Group 7 play-off
4	Jordan Brown (NIR)	5	2	3	10	13	−3	Qualification to Group 7 play-off
5	Pang Junxu (CHN)	5	2	3	8	11	−3	Eliminated from the competition
6	Sam Craigie (ENG)	5	0	5	3	15	−12	Eliminated from the competition
7	Ronnie O'Sullivan (ENG)	0	0	0	0	0	0	Withdrew after first day's play

Source: Group 7 results from snooker.org and championshipleaguesnooker.co.uk
(W) Group winner

=== Group 7 play-offs ===
Semi-finals; Best of 5 frames
Jak Jones (WAL)	3
Jordan Brown (NIR)	0
Elliot Slessor (ENG)	1
Joe O'Connor (ENG)	3

Final; Best of 5 frames
Jak Jones (WAL)	0
Joe O'Connor (ENG)	3

== Winners' Group ==
The Winners' Group was played on 12 and 13 March 2024. There were 16 century breaks made in the Winners' Group, the highest being 143 made by Neil Robertson. Mark Selby won the group and the tournament.

=== Winners' Group league matches ===
==== 12 March ====
- Kyren Wilson 3–2 Stuart Bingham
- Mark Selby 3–0 Joe O'Connor
- John Higgins 3–2 Stuart Bingham
- Neil Robertson 3–0 Chris Wakelin
- Mark Selby 1–3 John Higgins
- Kyren Wilson 0–3 Neil Robertson
- Chris Wakelin 1–3 Joe O'Connor
- Neil Robertson 1–3 Stuart Bingham
- Mark Selby 3–0 Kyren Wilson
- John Higgins 3–0 Joe O'Connor
- Kyren Wilson 3–2 Chris Wakelin
- Mark Selby 0–3 Stuart Bingham

==== 13 March ====
- John Higgins 2–3 Chris Wakelin
- Neil Robertson 2–3 Joe O'Connor
- Kyren Wilson 3–2 Joe O'Connor
- Mark Selby 3–1 Chris Wakelin
- Mark Selby 3–1 Neil Robertson
- John Higgins 3–1 Kyren Wilson
- Chris Wakelin 1–3 Stuart Bingham
- John Higgins 3–0 Neil Robertson
- Stuart Bingham 0–3 Joe O'Connor

=== Winners' Group table ===
Pos	Player	Pld	W	L	FF	FA	FD	
1	John Higgins (SCO)	6	5	1	17	7	+10	Qualification to Winners' Group play-off
2	Mark Selby (ENG) (W)	6	4	2	13	8	+5	Qualification to Winners' Group play-off
3	Stuart Bingham (ENG)	6	3	3	13	11	+2	Qualification to Winners' Group play-off
4	Joe O'Connor (ENG)	6	3	3	11	12	−1	Qualification to Winners' Group play-off
5	Kyren Wilson (ENG)	6	3	3	10	15	−5	Eliminated from the competition
6	Neil Robertson (AUS)	6	2	4	10	12	−2	Eliminated from the competition
7	Chris Wakelin (ENG)	6	1	5	8	17	−9	Eliminated from the competition

Source: Winners' Group results from snooker.org and championshipleaguesnooker.co.uk
(W) Group winner

=== Winners' Group play-offs ===
Semi-finals; Best of 5 frames
John Higgins (SCO)	0
Joe O'Connor (ENG)	3
Mark Selby (ENG)	3
Stuart Bingham (ENG)	0

Final; Best of 5 frames
Joe O'Connor (ENG)	1
Mark Selby (ENG)	3

== Final ==
Final
Final: Best of 5 frames. Referee: David Ford; Leicester Arena, Leicester, England, 13 March 2024.
Joe O'Connor; England	1–3	Mark Selby; England
Frame scores: 67–55, 0–74, 0–137 (137), 35–71
(frame 1) 47	Highest break	137 (frame 3)
0	Century breaks	1

== Century breaks ==
A total of 146 (Note: Century breaks for each group: Group 1: 19; Group 2: 17; Group 3: 26; Group 4: 18; Group 5: 19; Group 6: 15; Group 7: 16; Winners' Group: 16.) (Note: Players who made eight or more centuries: Mark Selby: 21; Kyren Wilson: 21; John Higgins: 18; Neil Robertson: 11; Joe O'Connor: 8; Ryan Day: 8; Elliot Slessor: 8.) century breaks were made during the tournament.

- **147** (5), **143** (4), 143, 132, 131, 130, 130, 129, 127, 125, 109, 109, 107, 107, 104, 102, 102, 101 – John Higgins
- **147** (3), **140** (1), 140, 139, 137, 131, 131, 130, 128, 123, 120, 117, 111, 109, 108, 107, 106, 104, 104, 102, 100 – Kyren Wilson
- **147** (7), 139, 139, 132, 114, 109, 106, 100 – Joe O'Connor
- **143** (W), 137, 137, 135, 135, 133, 127, 117, 114, 107, 106 – Neil Robertson
- **142** (6), 139, 133, 132, 128, 125, 122 – Ricky Walden
- **142** (2), 101 – Ali Carter
- 141, 122 – Pang Junxu
- **140** (1), 110, 105, 103 – Chris Wakelin
- 139, 138, 128, 105, 104 – Barry Hawkins
- 139, 106 – Fan Zhengyi
- 138, 100 – Stuart Bingham
- 137, 137, 136, 132, 131, 129, 129, 128, 124, 123, 123, 123, 121, 120, 119, 118, 115, 113, 111, 104, 101 – Mark Selby
- 136, 130, 129, 122, 105, 102, 102, 100 – Ryan Day
- 134, 133, 115, 112, 105, 105, 100, 100 – Elliot Slessor
- 133, 106, 100 – Xiao Guodong
- 129, 120, 105 – Jak Jones
- 129, 113, 100 – Ronnie O'Sullivan
- 128, 104 – Tom Ford
- 128 – Jimmy Robertson
- 126 – Noppon Saengkham
- 122, 121, 115, 104, 102, 100 – Gary Wilson
- 117, 105 – Sam Craigie
- 114, 105 – David Gilbert
- 109, 107, 104 – Matthew Selt
- 105 – Jordan Brown

Note: Bold = highest break in the indicated group.

== Winnings ==
No.	Player (Note: Table updated at end of play on 13 March.)	1	2	3	4	5	6	7	W	Total
1	Mark Selby (ENG) (5)		4,900	6,300					14,400	25,600
2	Kyren Wilson (ENG) (9)	**2,850**	2,600	**2,700**	4,700	1,000	6,100		2,000	21,950
3	John Higgins (SCO) (12)			4,500	**3,100**	**6,700**			6,400	20,700
4	Joe O'Connor (ENG) (35)						1,100	**6,900**	8,400	16,400
5	Stuart Bingham (ENG) (26)	6,100							5,600	11,700
6	Neil Robertson (AUS) (7)			2,300	6,000				**3,000**	11,300
7	Chris Wakelin (ENG) (23)	**1,450**	6,100						1,600	9,150
8	Ricky Walden (ENG) (25)				1,100	4,600	**1,300**			7,000
9	Gary Wilson (ENG) (17)	4,400	1,200	1,000						6,600
10	Elliot Slessor (ENG) (51)						2,900	2,800		5,700
11	Barry Hawkins (ENG) (15)				2,200	3,100				5,300
12	Pang Junxu (CHN) (31)						4,300	800		5,100
13	Jak Jones (WAL) (41)							4,700		4,700
14	Fan Zhengyi (CHN) (32)					2,900	1,200			4,100
15	Ryan Day (WAL) (20)	3,300	600							3,900
16	Sam Craigie (ENG) (51)						2,900	500		3,400
17	Ali Carter (ENG) (10)		**3,000**							3,000
18	Xiao Guodong (CHN) (38)			1,200	1,200					2,400
19	Jordan Brown (NIR) (42)							2,000		2,000
20	Noppon Saengkham (THA) (22)	1,300								1,300
21	Jimmy Robertson (ENG) (36)				1,100					1,100
22	David Gilbert (ENG) (32)					1,000				1,000
23	Matthew Selt (ENG) (29)		900							900
24	Joe Perry (ENG) (27)					800				800
=	Ronnie O'Sullivan (ENG) (1)							800		800
26	Tom Ford (ENG) (18)			700						700
27	Robert Milkins (ENG) (14)	600								600
	Total prize money:	20,000	19,300	18,700	19,400	20,100	19,800	18,500	41,400	177,200

Green: Won the Group.
Bold: Highest break in the Group.
Numbers in parentheses: World ranking prior to tournament start, 2 January 2024.
All prize money in GBP. (Note: Source (championshipleaguesnooker.co.uk) does not include high-break prize money in totals.)
