= World Open Under-16 Snooker Championships =

The World Open Under-16 Snooker Championships (IBSF World Under-16 Snooker Championship) is a non-professional junior snooker tournament, held for the first time in Saint Petersburg, Russia, in October 2017. The event is endorsed by the International Billiards and Snooker Federation (IBSF).

== Winners ==
=== Boys ===
Year	Venue	Winner	Runner-up	Score
2017	Saint Petersburg, Russia	(Wales) Dylan Emery	(Russia) Mikhail Terekhov	4–1
2018	Saint Petersburg, Russia	(Belgium) Ben Mertens	(Republic of Ireland) Aaron Hill	4–3
2019	Tyumen, Russia	(Poland) Antoni Kowalski	(Hungary) Bulcsú Révész	4–2
2022	Bucharest, Romania	(Wales) Liam Davies	(Hungary) Bulcsú Révész	4–2

=== Girls ===
Year	Venue	Winner	Runner-up	Score
2017	Saint Petersburg, Russia	(India) Anupama Ramachandran	(India) Keerthana Pandian	3–1
2018	Saint Petersburg, Russia	(India) Keerthana Pandian	(Belarus) Albina Leschuk	3–1
2019	Tyumen, Russia	(Belarus) Albina Leschuk	(Russia) Sophia Beldenko	3–2

== See also ==
- IBSF World Under-18 Snooker Championship
- IBSF World Under-21 Snooker Championship
- IBSF World Snooker Championship
