= Bulcsú Révész =

Hungarian snooker player (born 2007)

Personal information
- Born: 1 January 2007 (age 19)

Sport
- Country: Hungary
- Sport: Snooker
- Professional: 2024–2026
- Highest ranking: 79 (July 2025)
- Current ranking: (as of 26 October 2026)
- Best ranking finish: Last 32

Bulcsú Révész (born 1 January 2007) is a Hungarian former professional snooker player. He is the first ever professional snooker player from Hungary.

In February 2024 he won the 2024 WSF World Junior Championship, and with it earned a two-year card on the World Snooker Tour starting with 2024–25 snooker season.

== Career ==
In 2019, competing as a 12-year-old, Révész made the last-16 of the six-red snooker event at the EBSA European Championships. He reached the quarter-finals of the EBSA European Snooker Open, where he lost out to the eventual winner Kristján Helgason from Iceland. That year, he was runner-up at the under-16 European Championship and the under-16 World Championship, and finished third at the under-21 World Championship. He was defeated by Liam Davies in the final of the 2022 World Open Under-16 Snooker Championships. The following year, he became European under-18 snooker champion, defeating Liam Pullen in the final of the 2023 EBSA European Snooker Championships.

In November 2023, Révész competed in qualifying for the professional 2023 UK Championship. He lost 3‍–‍6 against professional Hammad Miah. However, during the match he hit a total clearance 140 break which marked his highest competitive break. He played in the single-frame professional tournament, the 2023 Snooker Shoot Out where he played 2005 World Snooker Championship winner Shaun Murphy. Murphy won the match with the first maximum break made under the format.

At the WSF Snooker Championship held in Albania in February 2024, Révész defeated China's Gong Chenzhi 5‍–‍3 in the final. Winning the event awarded Révész a professional place on the World Snooker Tour from the 2024–25 snooker season. In doing so, he becomes the first professional Hungarian snooker player. In March 2024, he beat Latvian Artemijs Žižins and Vladislav Gradinari of Moldova to win the European U18 championship.

In the first round of qualifying for the 2024 World Snooker Championship he defeated Sean O'Sullivan 10–8, having comeback from 6-1 and 8–5 down. In the second round, he was defeated 10–8 by James Cahill.

=== 2024–25 season ===
He began his pro career at the 2024 Championship League in Leicester in June 2024, where he was defeated by World Championship finalist Jak Jones in his round robin group. In July 2024, he recorded a 5-0 whitewash over experienced professional David Grace in qualifying for the 2024 Xi'an Grand Prix. He reached the third round of the 2024 Saudi Arabia Snooker Masters with a 4–3 win over Mark Davis. At the 2024 English Open in Brentwood in September 2024 he reached the last-64 where he was defeated by Stephen Maguire. At the 2024 British Open in Cheltenham he recorded a 4–3 win over Ali Carter. He came from 3–0 down to beat Iulian Boiko 4-3 and whitewashed Robbie Williams to reach the last-64 at the 2024 Northern Ireland Open. He recorded a win over Baipat Siripaporn in qualifying for the 2025 German Masters.

=== 2025-26 season ===
He suffered a loss to Si Jiahui in the first qualifying round for the Wuhan Open in June 2025, his opening match of the 2025–26 season. He was drawn in the round-robin stage of the 2025 Championship League, in Leicester in July 2025, against Shaun Murphy, Alfie Burden and Robbie McGuigan, recording wins over Murphy and McGuigan, and only missed out on top-spot by frame difference. He reached the third qualifying round at the 2025 UK Championship before losing a deciding frame 6–5 to Elliot Slessor.

Revesz reached the last-32 of a ranking event for the first time in December at the 2025 Snooker Shoot Out by beating Liam Davies. He also reached the last-32 of the 2026 Welsh Open, before losing on a deciding frame against John Higgins. In April, he recorded a 10–6 win over Craig Steadman and a 10–8 win over Louis Heathcote in the first two rounds of qualifying for the 2026 World Snooker Championship before a 10–6 loss to Zhang Anda meant Revesz was relegated from the circuit.

After dropping off the tour following the conclusion of the 2025–26 season, he entered Q School but was defeated by Jeff Cundy in event one. In event two, he reached the quarter-final of his section with wins over Scotland's Evan Munro Amir Nardeia of Portugal, before facing fellow former professional Gong Chenzhi.

== Performance and rankings timeline ==
Tournament	2022/ 23	2023/ 24	2024/ 25	2025/ 26
Ranking (Note: It shows the ranking at the beginning of the season)	(Note: He was an amateur)		(Note: New players on the Main Tour don't have a ranking)	79
Championship League	A	A	RR	RR
Saudi Arabia Masters	Not Held		3R	2R
Wuhan Open	NH	A	LQ	LQ
English Open	A	A	1R	LQ
British Open	A	A	1R	1R
Xi'an Grand Prix	Not Held		1R	LQ
Northern Ireland Open	A	A	1R	LQ
International Championship	Not Held		LQ	LQ
UK Championship	A	LQ	LQ	LQ
Shoot Out	A	1R	2R	3R
Scottish Open	A	A	LQ	LQ
German Masters	A	A	LQ	LQ
World Grand Prix	DNQ	DNQ	DNQ	DNQ
Players Championship	DNQ	DNQ	DNQ	DNQ
Welsh Open	A	A	LQ	2R
World Open	Not Held		LQ	LQ
Tour Championship	DNQ	DNQ	DNQ	DNQ
World Championship	LQ	LQ	LQ	LQ

Performance Table Legend
LQ	lost in the qualifying draw	#R	lost in the early rounds of the tournament (WR = Wildcard round, RR = Round robin)	QF	lost in the quarter-finals
SF	lost in the semi-finals	F	lost in the final	W	won the tournament
DNQ	did not qualify for the tournament	A	did not participate in the tournament	WD	withdrew from the tournament

NH / Not Held	means an event was not held.
NR / Non-Ranking Event	means an event is/was no longer a ranking event.
R / Ranking Event	means an event is/was a ranking event.
MR / Minor-Ranking Event	means an event is/was a minor-ranking event.

== Career finals ==
=== Amateur finals: 8 (5 titles) ===
Outcome	No.	Year	Championship	Opponent in the final	Score
Runner-up	1.	2019	World Under-16 Championship	(Poland) Antoni Kowalski	2–4
Winner	1.	2019	Hungarian Amateur Championship	(Hungary) Zsolt Fenyvesi	7–6
Runner-up	2.	2021	Hungarian Amateur Championship	(Hungary) Zsolt Fenyvesi	4–7
Runner-up	3.	2022	World Under-16 Championship (2)	(Wales) Liam Davies	2–4
Winner	2.	2022	Wels Open	(Israel) Shachar Ruberg	4–1
Winner	3.	2023	European Under-18 Championships	(England) Liam Pullen	4–3
Winner	3.	2024	European Under-18 Championships	(Moldova) Vladislav Gradinari	4–0
Winner	4.	2024	WSF Junior Championship	(China) Gong Chenzhi	5–3
