= 2025 UK Championship =

Professional ranking snooker tournament

2025 Victorian Plumbing UK Championship
- Part of the snooker Triple Crown

Tournament information
- Dates: 29 November – 7 December 2025
- Venue: York Barbican
- City: York
- Country: England
- Organisation: World Snooker Tour
- Format: Ranking event
- Total prize fund: £1,205,000
- Winner's share: £250,000
- Highest break: Liam Pullen (ENG) (147); Chang Bingyu (CHN) (147)

Final
- Champion: Mark Selby (ENG)
- Runner-up: Judd Trump (ENG)
- Score: 10–8

The 2025 UK Championship (officially the 2025 Victorian Plumbing UK Championship) was a professional snooker tournament that took place from 29 November to 7 December 2025 at the York Barbican in York, England. The 49th consecutive edition of the UK Championship since it was first staged in 1977, it was the ninth ranking event of the 2025–26 snooker season, following the 2025 International Championship and preceding the 2025 Snooker Shoot Out. It was the first of the season's three Triple Crown events, preceding the 2026 Masters and the 2026 World Snooker Championship. The tournament was broadcast by the BBC and TNT Sports domestically, by Eurosport in mainland Europe, by local channels in China and elsewhere in Asia, and by WST Play in all other territories. The winner received £250,000 from a total prize fund of £1,205,000.

The top 16 players in the snooker world rankings were seeded through to the main stage. An additional 128 players competed in a four‑round qualifying tournament from 22 to 27 November at the Robin Park Leisure Centre in Wigan, England, with higher ranked players given byes to the later rounds. The 16 successful qualifiers advanced to the main stage in York, where they were drawn at random against the 16 seeds. The last 32 featured 12 players from China, a record at any Triple Crown tournament.

Judd Trump was the defending champion, having defeated Barry Hawkins 10–8 in the 2024 final. Mark Selby defeated Trump 10–8 in the final to win his third UK Championship title, following his previous wins in 2012 and 2016. It was Selby's 10th Triple Crown title and 25th ranking title, and was his first victory at a Triple Crown tournament since the 2021 World Snooker Championship four and a half years earlier. He became the fourth player in professional snooker history to win 10 or more Triple Crown titles, following Steve Davis, Stephen Hendry, and Ronnie O'Sullivan.

The event produced 118 century breaks, 83 during the qualifiers in Wigan and 35 at the main stage in York. Liam Pullen and Chang Bingyu both made the maiden maximum breaks of their professional careers, in the first and third rounds of qualifying respectively. These were the 15th and 16th maximums of the season, breaking the record of 15 set in the 2024–25 season. The highest break at the main stage was a 138 by Hawkins in his quarter-final match against Selby.

== Overview ==
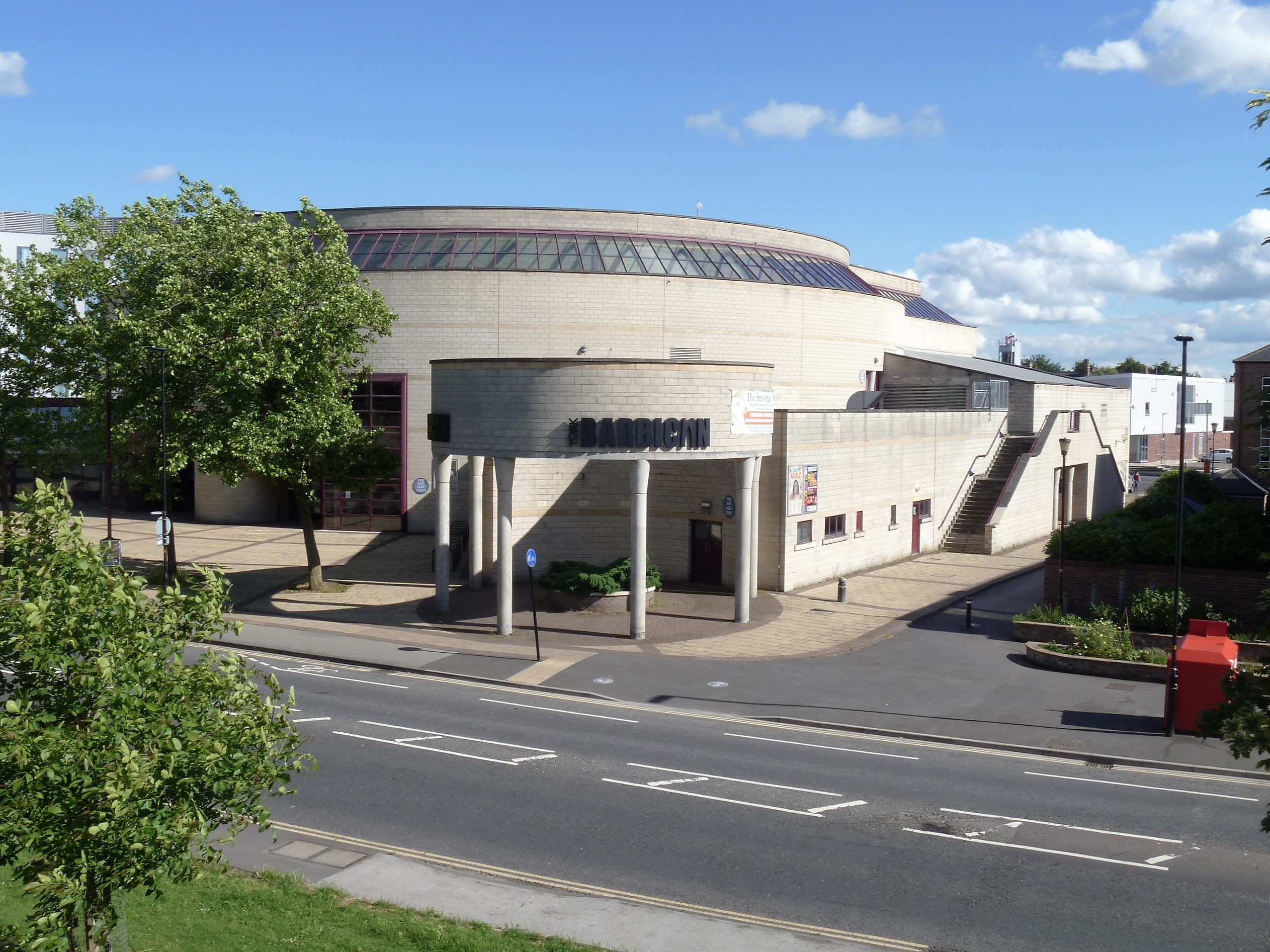
The main stage of the tournament was played at the York Barbican (pictured in 2016) in York, England.

The UK Championship was first held in 1977 as the United Kingdom Professional Snooker Championship, staged at Blackpool Tower Circus in Blackpool, England. Patsy Fagan won the inaugural event, defeating Doug Mountjoy 12–9 in the final. Joe Davis, who had won the World Snooker Championship 15 times between 1927 and 1946, presented Fagan with the trophy. For the tournament's first seven years, only United Kingdom residents or passport holders were eligible to compete. At the 1984 event, the UK Championship became a ranking tournament open to players of any nationality. As of the 2024 edition, Ronnie O'Sullivan was the most successful player in the tournament's history, having won the title eight times.

The 2025 edition of the tournament—its 49th consecutive staging since the inaugural edition in 1977—took place from 29 November to 7 December at the York Barbican in York, England. It was the ninth ranking event of the 2025–26 snooker season, following the 2025 International Championship and preceding the 2025 Snooker Shoot Out. It was the first of the season's three Triple Crown events, preceding the 2026 Masters and the 2026 World Snooker Championship. The top 16 in the snooker world rankings following the event qualified for the 2026 Masters. Judd Trump was the defending champion, having defeated Barry Hawkins 10–8 in the 2024 final to win his second UK Championship title.

=== Format ===
The event used a format adopted since the 2022 edition, which is similar to the format of the World Championship. The top 16 players in the world rankings, as they stood after the 2025 International Championship, were seeded through to the round of 32. An additional 128 players—comprising professionals ranked outside the top 16 and leading amateur players from the Q Tour and other amateur events—competed in a four‑round qualifying tournament from 22 to 27 November at the Robin Park Leisure Centre in Wigan, England, with higher ranked players given byes to the later rounds. The 16 successful qualifiers advanced to the round of 32, where they were drawn at random against the top 16 seeds. All matches were played as the best of 11 frames up to the final, which was the best of 19 frames played over two sessions.

=== Broadcasters ===
The qualifying rounds were broadcast in the United Kingdom, Germany, Italy, and Austria by Discovery+ and in other European territories by HBO Max. They were broadcast in mainland China by the CBSA‑WPBSA Academy WeChat Channel, the CBSA‑WPBSA Academy Douyin, Huya Live, and Migu. In all other territories, including Ireland, they were streamed by WST Play. On 24 and 25 November, matches on table one were streamed for free on WST Play and YouTube. On 26 and 27 November, coverage of the final qualifying round (billed as "Judgement Day") was streamed for free on WST Play and YouTube.

The main stage was broadcast in the United Kingdom by the BBC and in the UK and Ireland by TNT Sports and Discovery+. It was broadcast in mainland Europe by Eurosport, with streaming coverage on Discovery+ in Germany, Italy, and Austria and on HBO Max in other European territories. It was broadcast in mainland China by the same broadcasters as the qualifying rounds, with the addition of coverage by CCTV-5. It was broadcast in Hong Kong by Now TV, in Thailand by TrueSports, in Taiwan by Sportcast, in Mongolia by N Sports, in the Philippines by TAP Sports, and in Malaysia and Brunei by Astro SuperSport. In territories where no other coverage was available, the tournament was streamed by WST Play.

=== Prize fund ===
The breakdown of prize money for the event is as shown below. In addition, during the 2025–26 snooker season, a player who made two maximum breaks across the four qualifying events—the 2025 Saudi Arabia Snooker Masters, the 2025 UK Championship (including qualifiers), the 2026 Masters, and the 2026 World Championship (including qualifiers)—won a bonus of £147,000. The bonus had been won earlier in the season by O'Sullivan, who made two 147s at the Saudi Arabia Masters, but could be won up to two more times, including multiple times by the same player.

- Winner: £250,000
- Runner-up: £100,000
- Semi-finalists: £50,000
- Quarter-finalists: £25,000
- Last 16: £15,000
- Last 32: £10,000
- Last 48: £7,500
- Last 80: £5,000
- Last 112: £2,500
- Highest break: £15,000
- Total: £1,205,000

== Summary ==
=== Qualifying ===
==== First qualification round ====
The first qualification round was played on 22 and 23 November. Liam Pullen made his maiden maximum break in his 6–1 victory over amateur player Kaylan Patel. The 232nd maximum in professional snooker history, it was the 15th maximum of the 2025–26 season, equalling the record for the most 147s in a single season (set the previous season). The youngest professional on the tour, 14-year-old Michał Szubarczyk, defeated the oldest professional, 63-year-old Jimmy White, by a 6–2 scoreline. Bai Yulu, the reigning World Women's Champion, made four half-century breaks as she eliminated Mostafa Dorgham 6–1. Mateusz Baranowski beat Sahil Nayyar despite having required three snookers in the deciding frame. Jiang Jun made three century breaks of 116, 114, and 117 as he whitewashed Mink Nutcharut. Marco Fu returned to competitive play after fracturing his elbow earlier in the season; he defeated Ng On-yee 6–2 to advance.

==== Second qualification round ====
The second qualification round was played on 23 and 24 November. Michael Holt, a quarter-finalist at the previous year's event, trailed 12-time World Women's Champion Reanne Evans 1–3 at the mid-session interval. He made a 131 break in frame five and tied the scores at 3–3, but Evans restored her two-frame advantage at 5–3. Holt then won three consecutive frames for a 6–5 victory. The 2003 winner Matthew Stevens defeated Hatem Yassen 6–3, while Fu, runner-up in 2008, beat Wang Yuchen by the same score. In a match that ended at 1:30 a.m. local time, Jamie Clarke won a deciding frame against Mark Davis by clearing from the brown to the black; Ian Burns also defeated Fan Zhengyi on the colours in a deciding frame. Pullen advanced with a 6–1 win over Farakh Ajaib, and Stan Moody beat Zhou Jinhao by the same score. Liam Highfield made two centuries as he defeated Gong Chenzhi 6–3, and Szubarczyk beat Jordan Brown 6–4.

==== Third qualification round ====
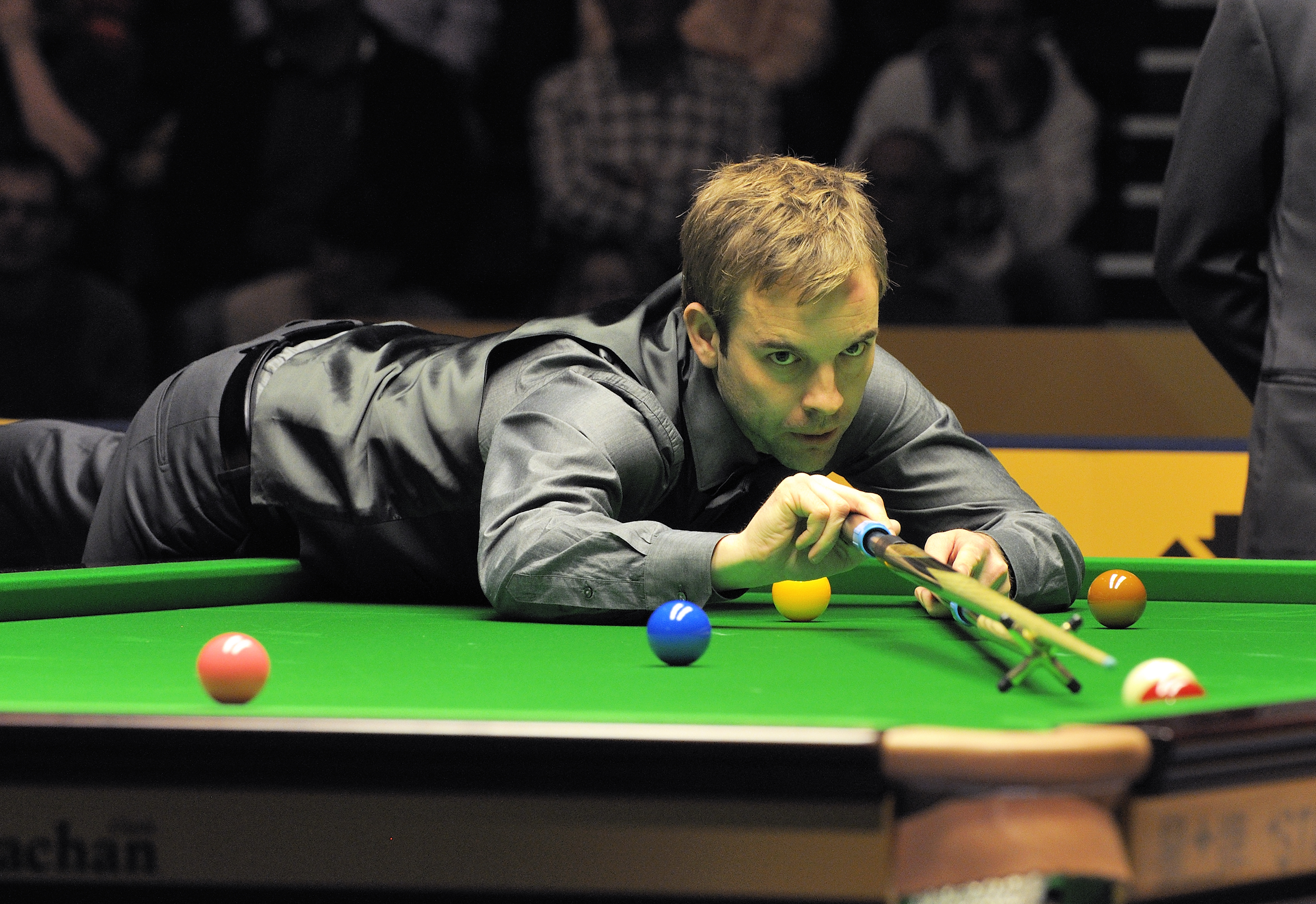
The three highest ranked players in the qualifiers lost in the third qualifying round, including the world number 19 Ali Carter (pictured in 2013).

The third qualification round was played on 24 and 25 November. Chang Bingyu made the first maximum break of his professional career in frame seven of his match against Stephen Maguire, completing the break by playing a thin cut on the last black while using the rest. It was the 233rd official maximum in snooker history and the 16th of the season, breaking the previous season record of 15. Despite Chang having made three centuries of 137, 101, and 147 to lead 4–3, Maguire took three of the last four frames and won the match 6–5. The 2023 World Champion Luca Brecel, who had not won a tournament since claiming his world title, lost 3–6 to the world number 106 Burns. From 2–3 behind, Holt won four consecutive frames to beat Jackson Page 6–3, and Mitchell Mann defeated Chris Wakelin by the same scoreline. Daniel Wells won a deciding frame on the colours to beat Robert Milkins. From 1–5 behind, Lyu Haotian won five consecutive frames to defeat Stevens 6–5.

Artemijs Žižins, aged 19, trailed Ali Carter 3–4 but won the last three frames of the match for a 6–4 victory, afterwards calling it the "biggest win" of his career. David Lilley beat Ricky Walden 6–3, and Noppon Saengkham defeated Szubarczyk by the same score, although Szubarczyk compiled his first professional century break during the match. Jack Lisowski, who had won his maiden ranking title a month earlier at the 2025 Northern Ireland Open, lost 2–6 to Louis Heathcote. Stuart Bingham trailed Pullen 4–5 but won the match with an 85 break in the deciding frame. Bulcsú Révész made back-to-back centuries of 144 and 101 as he took a 4–2 lead over Elliot Slessor, but Slessor recovered to win the match on the last black of a deciding frame. Zak Surety trailed Martin O'Donnell 0–4 and 2–5 but then took four consecutive frames, winning the decider with a century of 108.

After losing the first four frames against Zhou Yuelong, Fu withdrew for health reasons, meaning that Zhou won 6–0 by default. Clarke beat Matthew Selt 6–2, and Tom Ford made a highest break of 127 as he defeated Sam Craigie by the same score. Thepchaiya Un-Nooh made a 129 break in his 6–1 win over Robbie Williams. Long Zehuang beat Aaron Hill by the same scoreline, winning frame four on the last black after Hill had recovered from 57 points behind but missed frame ball, the last pink. Former World Championship runner-up Jak Jones lost 2–6 to Julien Leclercq, despite making centuries of 131 and 100 in the two frames he won. The losses by Wakelin, Jak Jones, and Carter meant that the three highest ranked players in the qualifiers failed to reach the fourth qualifying round.

==== Fourth qualification round ====
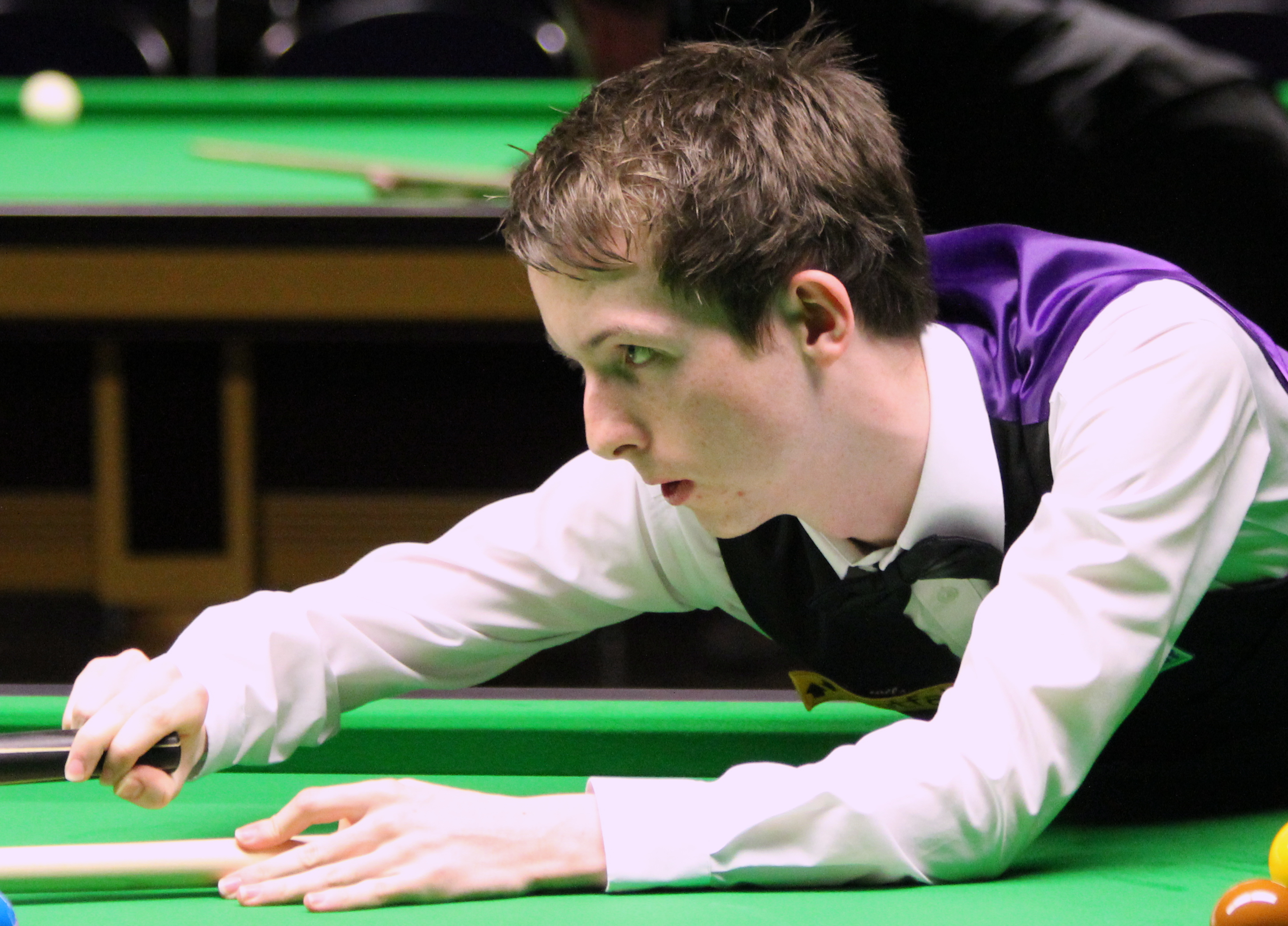
Scott Donaldson (pictured in 2012) came from 0–5 behind to beat Stuart Bingham 6–5 and advance to the main stage.

In the fourth and final qualification round, played on 26 and 27 November and billed as "Judgement Day", the 2004 champion and world number 25 Maguire defeated Burns 6–1. "I am not happy floating about where I am, coming to these qualifiers," stated Maguire afterwards, saying that he wanted to regain his top-16 ranking, which he had last held in 2022. Holt trailed Yuan Sijun 1–3 at the mid-session interval but then took five consecutive frames for a 6–3 win. "If I don't bottle it, I'm a decent player," said Holt afterwards, commenting that nerves had frequently affected his performances. Gilbert led Wells 3–1, but Wells recovered to tie the scores at 3–3 and 4–4, making two century breaks. However, Gilbert won the last two frames to secure a 6–4 victory. Lyu led Mann 3–1, but Mann tied the scores at 3–3. Lyu again moved two frames clear at 5–3, but Mann levelled at 5–5. Lyu won the decider, saying afterwards: "I was calm and I was able to take my chance."

Scott Donaldson lost the first five frames against Bingham but then made breaks of 56, 64, 110, 51, 91, and 64 as he won six consecutive frames for a 6–5 victory. "I don't think that was me, I think it was my dad," said Donaldson afterwards, referencing the recent death of his father Hector on 2 October. "I just got so much good luck at the end, which was very unusual, and I think dad was doing something." Zhou defeated amateur player Clarke 6–2, making centuries of 103 and 109. Slessor punched the table in frustration after falling 1–3 behind against Surety, but he won five of the last six frames for a 6–4 victory. Ben Woollaston made a century of 135 as he recovered from 1–4 behind against Joe O'Connor to tie the scores at 5–5; he went on to win the 67-minute deciding frame, afterwards calling it "the craziest match I have ever been involved in."

Facing Žižins, David Lilley won three consecutive frames, making a highest break of 138, to lead 4–2. Žižins tied the scores at 5–5, but 50-year-old Lilley, a former World Seniors Champion, won the decider to reach the last 32 of the tournament for the first time. Lilley had lost at the final qualifying round in the previous two years. Pang Junxu defeated Saengkham 6–2. Long trailed Heathcote 3–5 but recovered to win a deciding frame on the colours. Ryan Day, a semi-finalist at the 2017 event, made a century of 131 as he came from 3–4 behind to beat Hossein Vafaei in a deciding frame.

Leclercq won the first four frames against He Guoqiang, who recovered to tie the scores at 4–4. Leclercq won the next two frames for a 6–4 victory, reaching the last 32 of a ranking event for the first time. "Last year I lost on Judgement Day so I am very happy to win this time," Leclercq said afterwards. Zhang Anda won five of the first six frames against Un-Nooh and went on to secure a 6–4 victory. Lei defeated Jimmy Robertson in a deciding frame, and Xu Si beat Ford 6–3. Overall, twelve players from China, five seeds and seven qualifiers, reached the last 32, a record in a Triple Crown tournament. The previous highest number of players from China in the last 32 of the UK Championship had been nine at the 2020 edition.

=== Main stage ===
==== First round ====
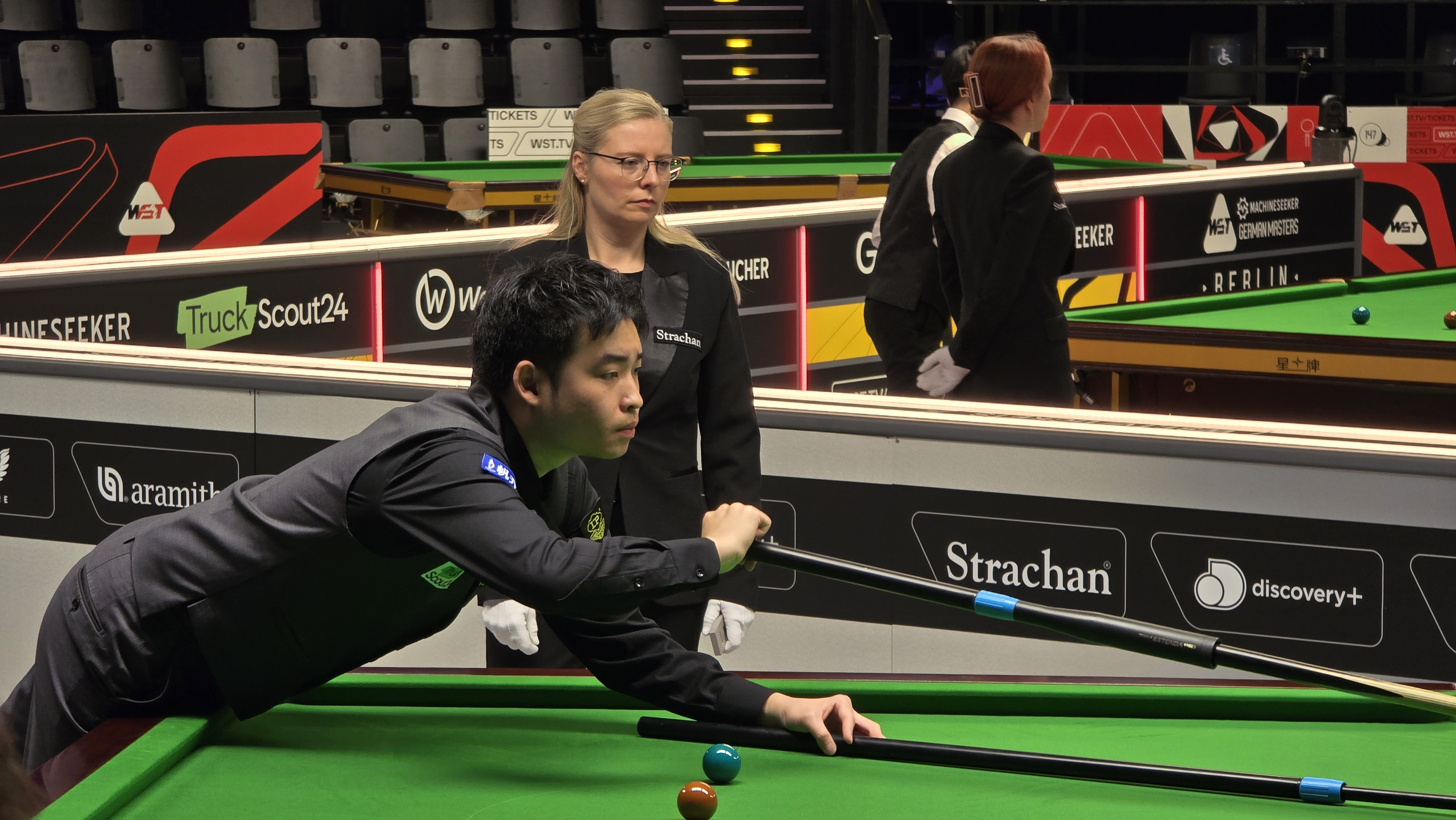
Si Jiahui (pictured in 2025) was one of a record 12 players from China to reach the last 32 of the tournament.

The first-round matches were played from 29 November to 2 December, featuring the 16 seeds against the 16 qualifiers. The defending champion and world number one Judd Trump reverted to his old brass-ferrule cue after playing with a titanium-ferrule cue earlier in the season. He led Maguire 3–1 at the mid-session interval, but Maguire made breaks of 111 and 82 to tie the scores at 3–3. In frame seven, Maguire led by 23 points when he missed a red to a centre pocket, and Trump took the frame with a break of 66. In frame eight, Maguire led by 35 points when he missed frame ball; Trump won the frame on a re-spotted black to lead 5–3 and went on to secure a 6–4 victory. Afterwards, Maguire criticised the table, blaming it for his pivotal missed red in frame seven. "That match was there for the winning. [The red] was a simple shot," he said. "Through no fault of my own, I'm out of the tournament. There's no way he played better than me." The 16th seed Si Jiahui whitewashed Day, who scored only 55 points in the match, making a highest break of just 22.

Competing in his 33rd UK Championship, the seventh seed John Higgins won the second and third frames on the last black as he took a 5–0 lead over Woollaston. Higgins led by 58 points in frame six when he missed a red; Woollaston won the frame with a 70 clearance and also took frame seven, but Higgins completed a 6–2 victory in frame eight. "[Woollaston] will be kicking himself," Higgins said afterwards. "He should have won frames two and three [but] I made some good clearances." The 10th seed Shaun Murphy won five frames in a row to secure a 6–2 win over Lyu. Murphy attempted a maximum break in frame seven but missed the 11th red. "Winning is all that matters," Murphy said afterwards. "I played nicely in parts, a few mistakes, but delighted to get through."

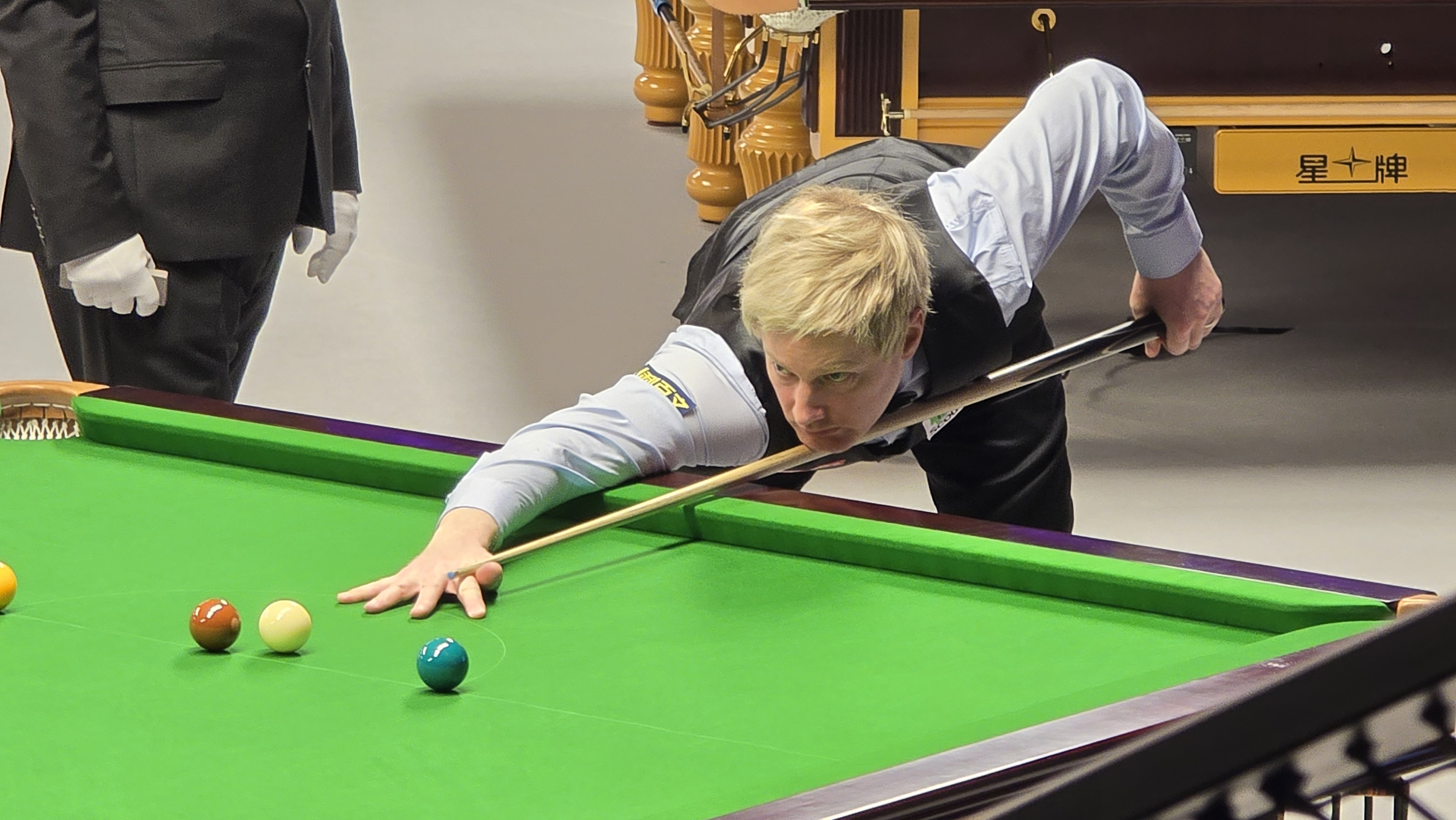
Neil Robertson (pictured in 2025) defeated UK Championship debutant Julien Leclercq to progress past the first round for the first time since he won the tournament in 2020.

The fourth seed Neil Robertson defeated the world number 79 Leclercq, the lowest-ranked player at the main stage, by a 6–2 scoreline. Robertson, who attempted a maximum in the last frame but missed the ninth red, praised his 22-year-old opponent afterwards, calling him "a great talent" and saying "I was pleased for him to get this experience early on in his career." The 13th seed Wu Yize won the first five frames against Holt, making breaks including 55, 78, and 82 before attempting a maximum break in frame five; he missed the 11th black. Holt then won four consecutive frames, producing breaks including 59, 82, and 60, before Wu secured a 6–4 victory. "I was quite pleased with myself in the first half, because I took my chances," Wu said afterwards, while adding that he did not play well during Holt's four-frame comeback. Holt later voiced his unhappiness with the replacement of balls in the last frame of the match, after referee Leo Scullion had called a miss against Wu.

Playing Gilbert, the fifth seed Mark Williams won four frames in a row as he took a 5–2 lead. Gilbert made breaks of 100 and 50 to win the next two frames, but Williams secured a 6–4 victory in frame 10. "Before the interval I was poor but after that I played pretty good," said Williams afterwards. "It could have gone 5–5 at the end but I'm happy to get over the line." The 12th seed Xiao Guodong lost the first three frames against Pang but won the next two with back-to-back centuries of 101 and 104. Pang then won another three consecutive frames for a 6–2 victory, making Xiao the first seeded player to exit the tournament. Pang, whose mother had travelled from China to watch him play, said afterwards: "Neither of us played well tonight and Xiao was unlucky. On the other hand, I was a bit lucky and it helped me to pull through the tougher moments."

The afternoon session on 1 December was the first time a two-table setup at a Triple Crown event had featured an all-Chinese lineup. The reigning World Champion Zhao Xintong opened his match against Long with a century of 107 and moved into a 5–0 lead. Long won frame six with a fluke on the last pink, but Zhao completed a 6–1 victory with a 72 break in frame seven. "I have been aware of how much people expect me to do well since winning the world title, but I'm trying to keep a composed mindset," Zhao said afterwards. On the other table, the ninth seed Ding Junhui won the first frame against Xu with a century of 103 and took a 3–1 lead at the mid-session interval. Xu won frame five on a re-spotted black and also took frame six to tie the scores at 3–3. However, Ding made breaks of 92, 109, and 64 as he won three of the last four frames for a 6–4 victory. "The first five or six frames it didn't look like I was in the game, then I found some breaks," Ding said afterwards.

In a match featuring a number of lengthy frames, one lasting 59 minutes and two others over 45 minutes, the world number 52 Donaldson defeated the eighth seed and 2022 winner Mark Allen 6–1. "After what I've been through I can tell you what is important," said Donaldson afterwards, indicating that his father's death the previous month had put the sport in perspective. "When the pressure comes on, I tell myself, this is a game of snooker, get on with it." Tied at 3–3 with Zhang, the 15th seed Gary Wilson made breaks of 65 and 91 to move one from victory at 5–3. However, Zhang won the last three frames for a 6–5 victory. "Throughout the match, I felt mentally steady and didn't worry too much about the result," Zhang said afterwards. "Even when I was 5–3 down, I was just waiting him to give me a chance and I was ready to take it."

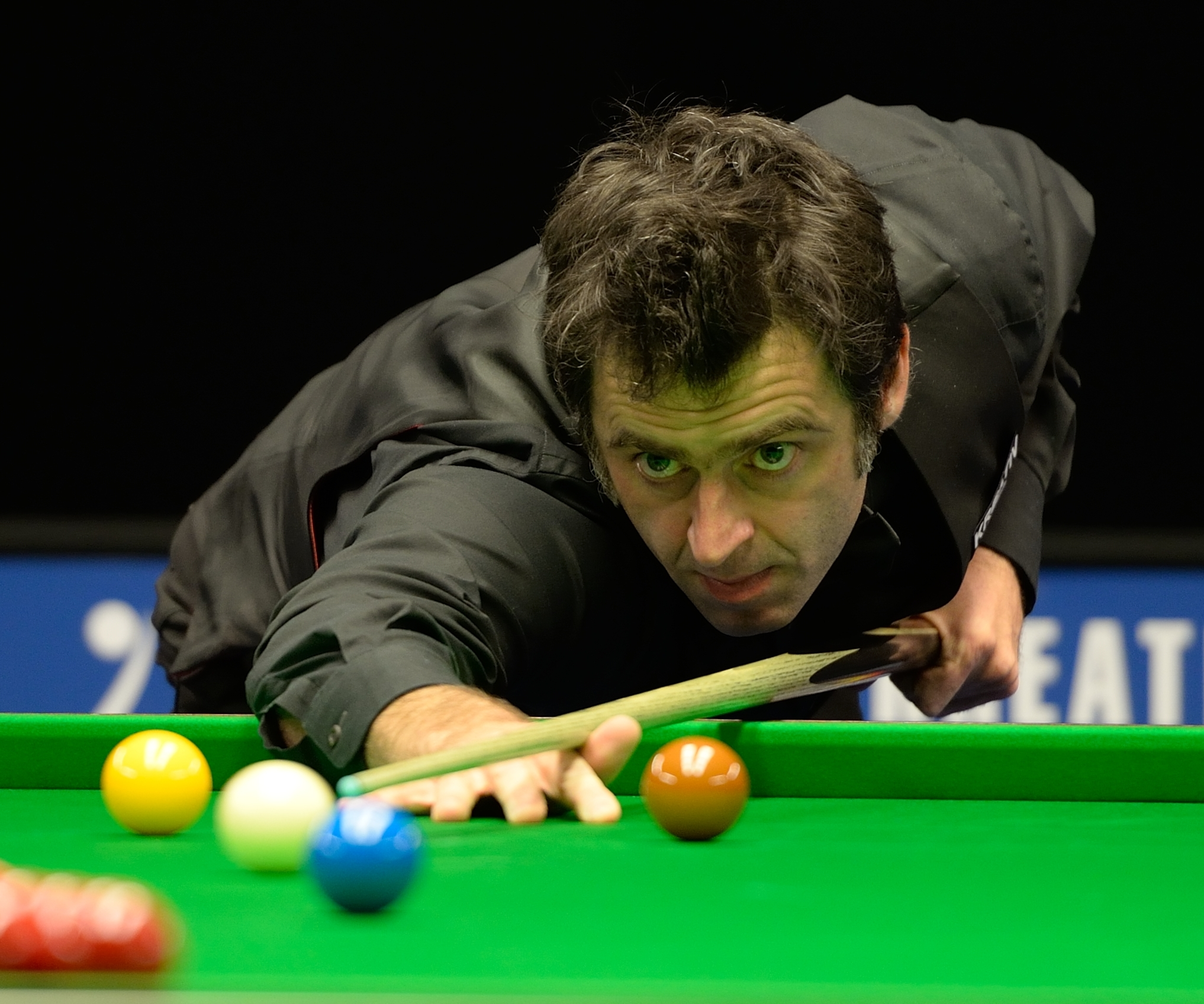
The eight-time UK Champion Ronnie O'Sullivan (pictured in 2015) lost in the first round for a second consecutive year.

The eight-time champion Ronnie O'Sullivan played professionally in the UK for the first time since losing in the semi-finals of the 2025 World Snooker Championship. Despite making breaks of 71, 123, 62, 94, 65, and 56 in the match, he lost 4–6 to Zhou, who won four frames on the last black and made a century of 125 in frame eight. It was the first time Zhou had beaten O'Sullivan, having lost all seven of their previous encounters. After exiting the tournament in the first round for a second consecutive year, O'Sullivan said: "[Zhou] played better. I missed a lot and [made] some bad, basic mistakes. Defeat is defeat. He deserved his victory." Calling O'Sullivan "the king of the Barbican," Zhou said: "To beat him here, I'm so proud of myself." Facing Lei, the 11th seed Mark Selby made breaks including 51, 82, 75, and 133 as he took a 5–0 lead. Although Lei won frames six and seven, Selby completed a 6–2 victory in frame eight. "Lei battled well [from 5–0 to 5–2]," Selby said afterwards. "He could've got his head down, so I'm happy to get over the line."

The third seed Kyren Wilson faced Slessor. The scores were tied at 2–2, but Slessor then won two consecutive frames for a 4–2 lead. Wilson produced back-to-back breaks of 104 and 91 as he drew level at 4–4, but Slessor won the next two frames for a 6–4 victory. "I just battled as hard as I could and stayed in there," Slessor said afterwards. "I knew it was a miracle that I was 4–2 up as he was the better player. He found a gear to go 4–4 and I knew I needed to find something myself." In tears during his post-match press conference, Wilson said: "I'm just very lost at the minute. You were very close to seeing someone have a mental breakdown out there." Commenting on a "freak accident" that had damaged his cue at the beginning of the season, he said he had experimented with multiple cues, ferrules, and tips without success and was "so angry" over the incident. He also criticised the match table for its "tight pockets and unplayable conditions," calling it "a recipe for disaster." The 14th seed and previous year's runner-up Barry Hawkins trailed Lilley 2–3 but won three consecutive frames and went on to secure a 6–4 victory, having made a highest break of 58. "It was a very difficult game," said Hawkins afterwards. "There was a spell mid-match where it looked like it would be a good standard, but it went scrappy again."

==== Second round ====
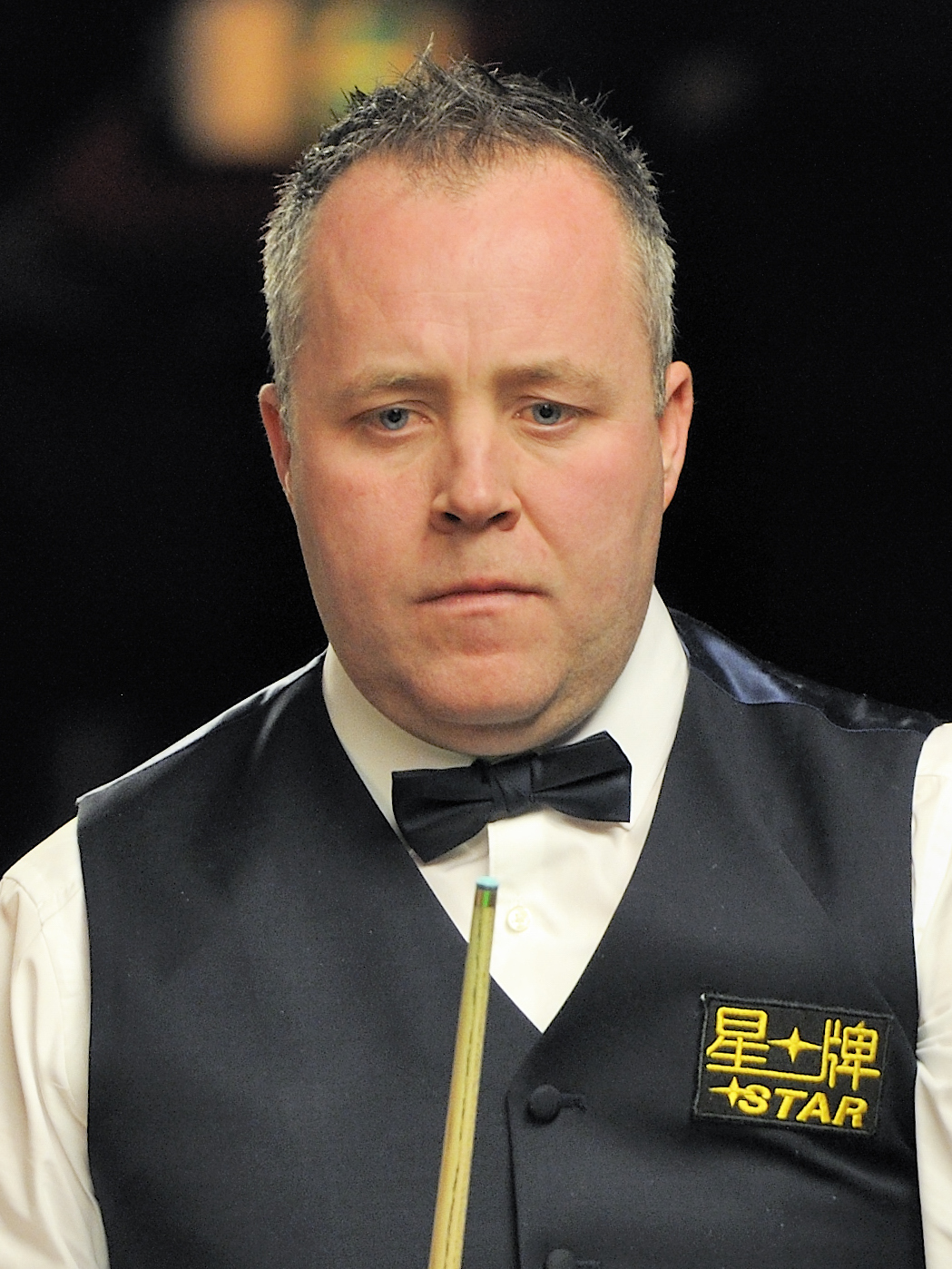
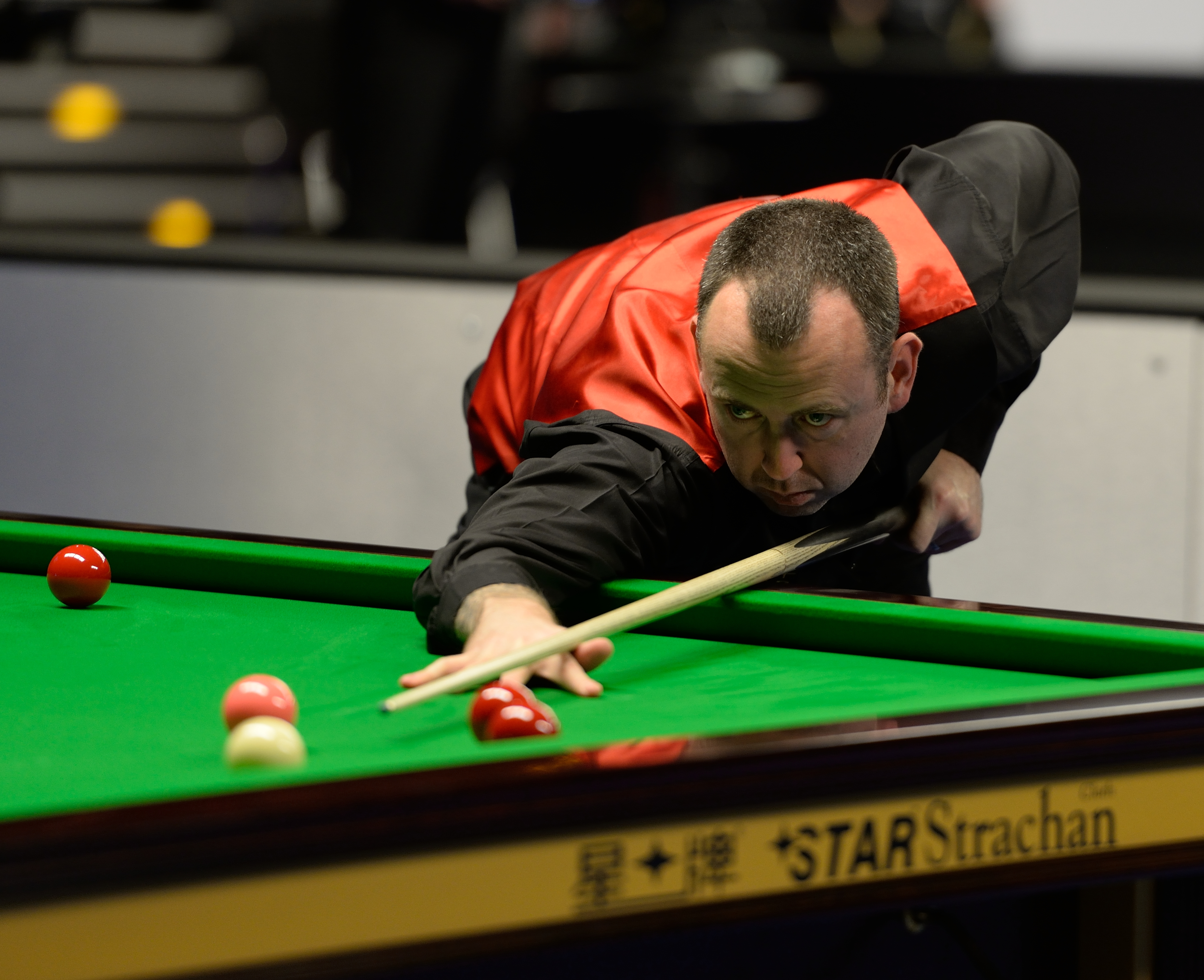
The remaining Class of '92 players John Higgins (left) and Mark Williams (right) both lost in the second round.

The second-round matches were played on 3 and 4 December. The round of 16 comprised 11 seeded players and 5 qualifiers. Robertson lost the first frame to Wu but then won six in a row, making breaks including 51, 65, 75, and 68, as he secured a 6–1 victory. "I thought after losing the first frame, which I should have won, I mentally recovered very quickly," Robertson said afterwards. Robertson also praised the tighter pockets at the event, saying that they were "keeping everyone honest." Williams lost four of the first five frames against Pang but won the next two to trail 3–4. In frame eight, Williams fouled a red, and Pang made a break of 53 to win the frame; he then made a century of 116 in frame nine to complete a 6–3 victory. "I've managed to beat two great players in a row, Xiao Guodong in the first round and now Mark Williams," Pang said afterwards. "I'm honestly exhausted, but very happy."

Trump and Si shared the first two frames of their second-round match. Trump made a century of 117 in the third frame, came from 64 points behind to take frame four with a clearance of 65, and also won the 37-minute fifth frame to lead 4–1. Si then won two consecutive frames, but Trump also won two in a row to complete a 6–3 victory. "I think it was pretty good, especially at the start up until 4–1," Trump said afterwards. "There was a little wobble in the middle of the game but in the end it was a slight improvement on round one." Selby and Zhou were tied at 2–2, but Selby won the 53-minute frame and then made breaks of 71, 75, and 56 to complete a 6–2 win. "It is getting harder to win Triple Crown titles," Selby said afterwards. "It was hard anyway, but it is even harder now with the standard. I feel like I'm happy with my game. I'm giving myself a chance in the tournament and that is all you can ask for."

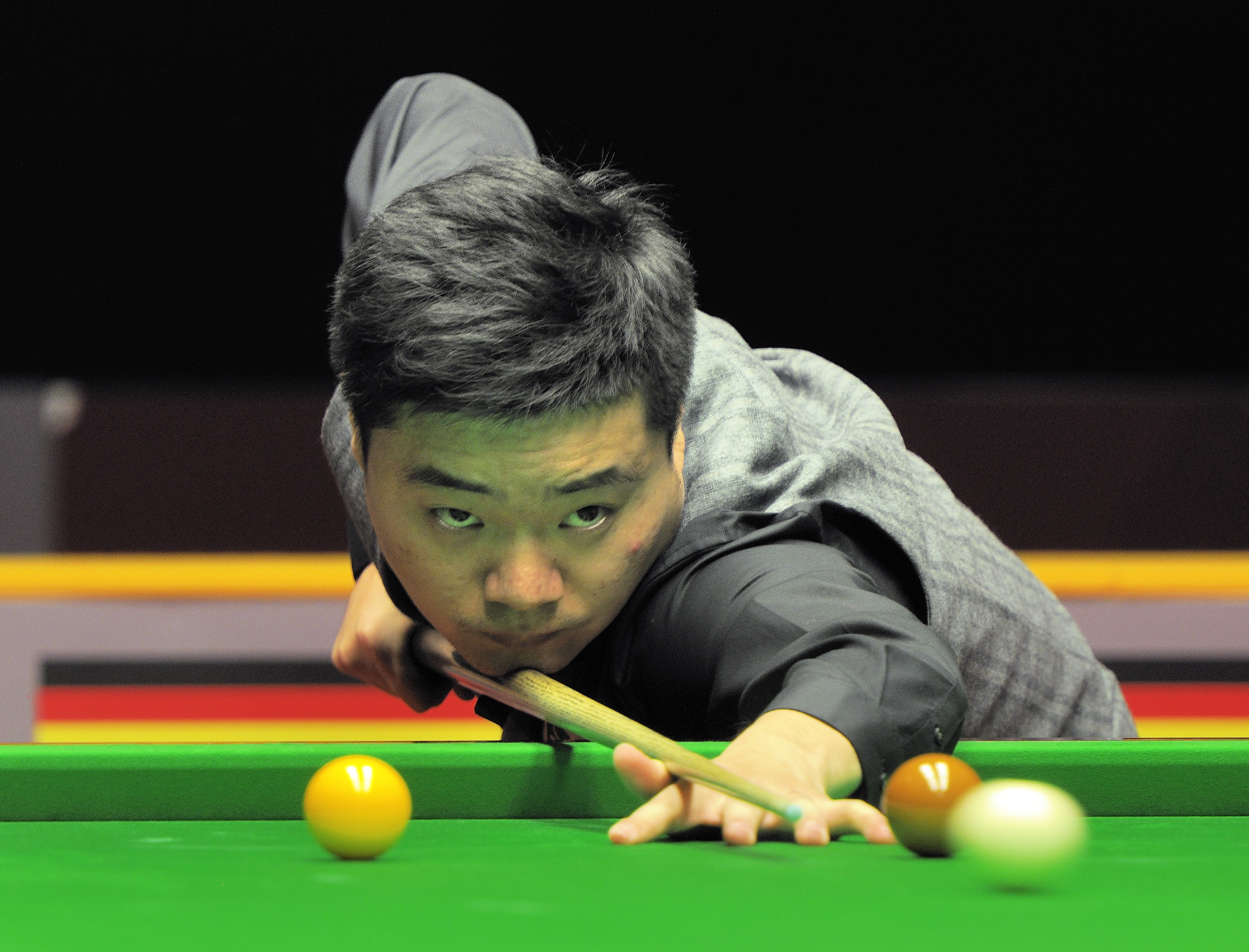
Ding Junhui (pictured in 2014) and Scott Donaldson received a standing ovation after their match. Ding won in a deciding frame.

Facing qualifier Donaldson, three-time champion Ding won the first three frames with breaks of 50, 114, and 76. Donaldson responded with breaks of 118 and 50 before Ding made a 60 break to move 4–2 ahead. Donaldson took the seventh frame with a 69 break, but Ding took the next to move one from victory at 5–3. However, Donaldson then produced breaks of 81 and 72 to tie the scores at 5–5. In the deciding frame, Ding made a long pot on a red and went on to win frame and match with a century of 109. The players received a standing ovation after the match. "[Donaldson] is talented and a good player. I want him to move on because what he showed in the last three frames is top class," said Ding afterwards. Donaldson said: "I should have gone for a red at the end. It was really risky, but you need to take these crazy risks to beat these guys." Zhang made breaks of 127, 129, 87, 69, and 73 as he defeated Zhao 6–2 to reach his third consecutive UK Championship quarter-final. "I hope I can go even further this time," he said afterwards. "In the Triple Crown events, the broadcasting, the audience and the whole tournament team are on a different level. Everything feels more professional."

Murphy attempted a maximum break in the first frame of his match against Higgins, missing the 11th black. Higgins then made breaks of 70, 70, and 78 to lead 3–1 at the mid-session interval. Higgins won frame five, but Murphy won the next two. Higgins made a 74 break to move one from victory at 5–3, but Murphy compiled breaks including 89 and 53 to tie the scores at 5–5. In the deciding frame, Higgins missed the last yellow to the green pocket and Murphy cleared the colours to win the match. Defeat for Higgins meant that he had failed to reach the quarter-finals of the tournament every year since 2019. "It is one of the best wins of my career," Murphy said afterwards. "I don't think it is an overstatement to say that. I've been lucky to have a great career and many memorable wins. But when you play one of the legends you have to throw everything at them." Hawkins recorded a 96 percent pot success rate as he made breaks including 94, 87, and 73 in his whitewash win over Slessor.

==== Quarter-finals ====
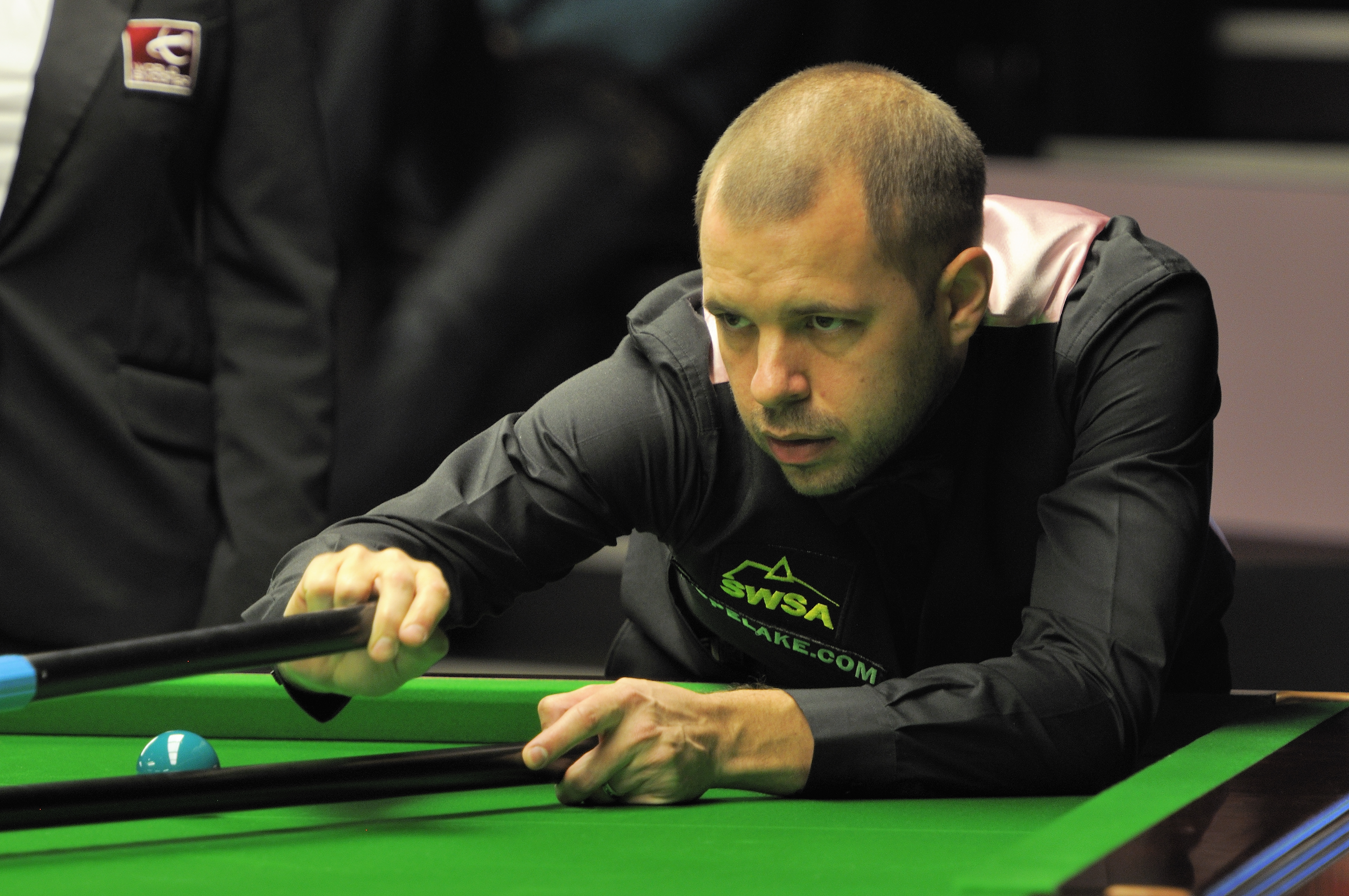
The previous year's runner-up Barry Hawkins (pictured in 2014) lost in the quarter-finals to Mark Selby.

In the quarter-finals, played on 5 December, Pang and Zhang were the only remaining qualifiers. Facing Trump, Ding made breaks of 89 and 83 to win the first two frames, but Trump produced breaks including 73, 91, and 50 as he won six frames in a row for a 6–2 victory. "In the last couple of events, I have found the confidence to go for it," Trump said afterwards. "Even though I am not back to my best, I've done everything I need to do at the crucial times." Facing Pang, Robertson took a 5–1 lead. Pang required three snookers in frame seven, but Robertson hit the black while trying to escape from a snooker, conceding seven penalty points and also leaving a free ball. Pang produced a 51 clearance to win the frame on the last black and then made breaks including 115 and 46 as he reduced Robertson's lead to 5–4. However, Robertson made a 75 break in frame 10 to secure a 6–4 win. "I was brilliant up to 5–1 and it is just one of those crazy things," Robertson said afterwards. "[Pang] did a good clearance under pressure and he made another century. I made a good match-winning break at the end."

Facing Hawkins, Selby made breaks including 64 and 115 as he took a 3–1 lead at the mid-session interval. Frame five lasted 48 minutes before Selby won it on the last pink; he also took frame six to lead 5–1. Hawkins made a century of 138 to win frame seven, but Selby completed a 6–2 victory with an 83 break, reaching his first UK Championship semi-final since he won the tournament in 2016. "I'm delighted to win but it is never nice to play [Hawkins]," Selby said afterwards. "He is my best mate on the tour. I spend a lot of time with him at tournaments, even this morning we had a cup of tea at the cafe with him and his wife. I have so much respect for him." Murphy played Zhang in a match that BBC Sport journalist Steve Sutcliffe described as an "error-strewn affair," commenting that "both players were well below their best." Despite making a 65 break, Zhang lost the first frame after failing to escape from a snooker and then going in-off the black. Murphy made breaks of 88, 73, and 73 as he secured a 6–3 victory, reaching the semi-finals for the first time since 2017. "I'm delighted to win, but that is about it," Murphy said afterwards. "We both played under par, I think, and I made a number of uncharacteristic mistakes which threw me."

==== Semi-finals ====
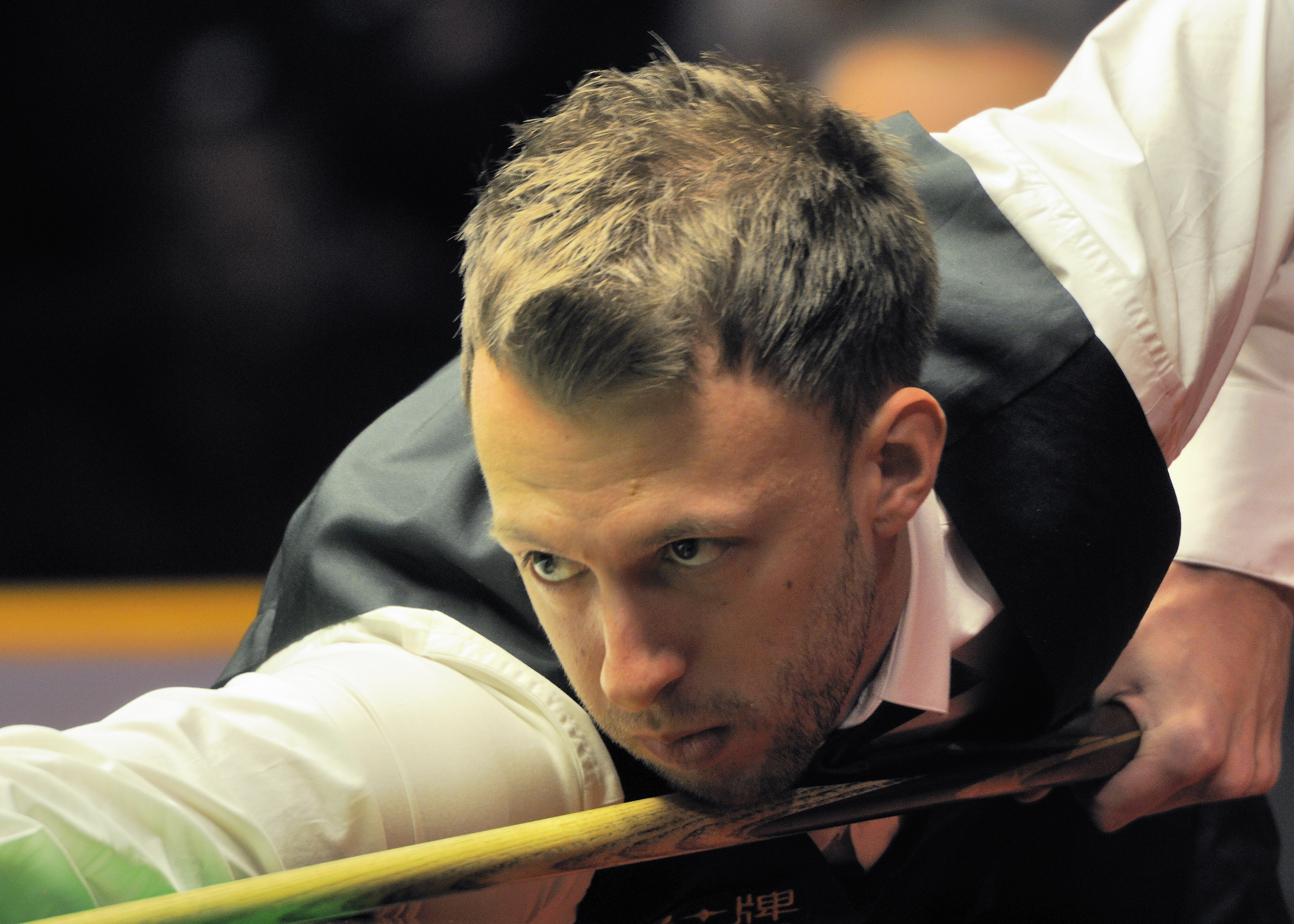
The defending champion Judd Trump (pictured in 2014) defeated Neil Robertson to reach his fifth UK Championship final.

The semi-finals were played on 6 December. For the first time since the 2009 event, all four semi-finalists were former champions. In the first semi-final, the defending champion Trump faced the fourth seed Robertson. Trump made breaks of 65 and 82 as he took a 2–1 lead, but Robertson made a century of 114 to tie the scores at 2–2 at the mid-session interval. Robertson moved ahead by winning the 47-minute fifth frame with a cross double on the last black, but Trump then made breaks of 72, 53, 68, and 53 as he won four frames in a row for a 6–3 victory. "I still felt positive despite losing the fifth frame," Trump said afterwards. "A lot of the time this season, I'd have put my head down a little bit. I was able to get in early next frame, rattle off a quick frame and I was back in and amongst it." Commenting on his recent defeats in the finals of the 2025 Northern Ireland Open and 2025 Champion of Champions, Trump added: "I have been in a few finals recently and it is never nice to be on the losing end. I need to use that as motivation and have the determination to come out on the right end."

In the second semi-final, the 10th seed Murphy faced the 11th seed Selby. A 73 break gave Selby the first frame, but Murphy tied the scores with a century of 131 in frame two. Selby took the third frame after Murphy missed a red with the rest and also won frames four and five with breaks of 73 and 105 to lead 4–1. Murphy won frames six and seven, reducing Selby's lead to one at 4–3, but Selby took frame eight with breaks of 72 and 55 and then secured a 6–3 victory with a century of 127 in frame nine. "I felt good from start to finish," Selby said afterwards, having missed just 12 pots in the match. "I was a little bit edgy at the start but that is understandable. It was a massive game for us both to try and get into a Triple Crown final. At the interval I felt relaxed and thought I was playing decent stuff." Victory for Selby meant that he had won 20 of the 35 professional matches between the two players.

==== Final ====
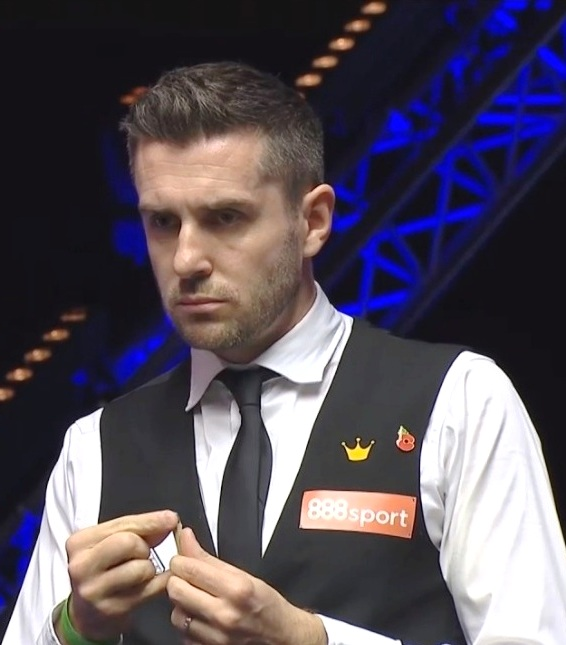
Mark Selby (pictured in 2020) defeated Judd Trump 10–8 in the final to win his third UK Championship title, 10th Triple Crown title, and 25th ranking title.

The final was played on 7 December, as the best of 19 frames played over two sessions, between the defending champion and world number one Judd Trump and the world number 11 Mark Selby. Trump was competing in the fifth UK Championship final of his career, having previously won the title in 2011 and 2024 and been runner-up in 2014 and 2020. Selby was contesting his fourth final, having won the title in 2012 and 2016 and been runner-up in 2013. Trump and Selby had played each other three weeks earlier in the 2025 Champion of Champions final, which Selby won 10–5. The match was their third meeting in a Triple Crown tournament, following the quarter-finals of the 2019 Masters and the 2023 UK Championship; it was the first time they had faced each other in a Triple Crown final.

Selby came from behind to win the first frame with a 77 clearance. He won the second frame after a safety battle on the last yellow and then made a 97 break to win frame three. Trump led by 68 points in frame four when he missed a red, and Selby took the frame with a 70 clearance. Selby made a century of 105 in the next frame to move 5–0 ahead. Only two players, Higgins in 2010 and Allen in 2022, had ever overcome a five-frame deficit in a best-of-19-frame UK Championship final. Trump took frames six and seven with breaks of 74 and 75. In frame eight, Trump required two snookers, as he trailed by 50 points with 43 remaining. Selby left a free ball after failing to escape from a snooker, and Trump nominated a green over a baulk pocket; however, he left the cue ball in the jaws after potting it, and then fouled by failing to hit the object ball while playing a roll-up. Trump conceded the frame, and the first session ended with Selby leading 6–2.

When play resumed for the second session, Selby won frame nine, again moving five clear at 7–2. Trump took frame ten, helped by a 62 break. In the 38-minute 11th frame, referee Olivier Marteel awarded Selby a free ball, only to reverse his decision after Trump objected and Selby agreed with his opponent. Trump went on to win the frame. In frame 12, Trump produced his first century of the match, a 109, winning a third consecutive frame and reducing Selby's lead to 7–5. Selby took frame 13 with a break of 91, but Trump won the next with another century of 125. Selby twice missed the black off its spot in frame 15, which Trump won with a 55 break to narrow Selby's lead to one at 8–7. Selby made a 77 break in frame 16 to move one from victory at 9–7. Trump won frame 17 after Selby missed a red. Selby went on to secure a 10–8 victory with a 69 break, winning his third UK Championship title and 25th ranking title. It was his tenth Triple Crown title, surpassing John Higgins's total of nine and making Selby the fourth player in professional snooker history to win ten or more Triple Crown titles, following Steve Davis, Stephen Hendry, and O'Sullivan. It was Selby's first victory at a Triple Crown tournament since winning the 2021 World Snooker Championship four and a half years previously. He advanced from eleventh to sixth place in the world rankings after the tournament.

"I missed a dolly [i.e., easy] red when I was in to win 10–7 and I was sitting in my chair thinking that if I lose 10–9 that will haunt me forever," Selby commented after the final. "It would have been worse than the Willie Thorne blue! [A shot missed by Thorne in the 1985 UK Championship final.] To make the break in the last, it is probably one of the best breaks of my career." Trump's loss was his third defeat in a UK Championship final and meant that he had failed to win an event in a calendar year for the first time since 2013. "I had a lot of chances this evening," Trump said afterwards. "It is my own fault and I missed too many easy balls. It isn't easy to get over the line in these big events and I was in a similar situation last year. I hoped that I would find my best but it didn't happen."

== Main draw ==
The results of the main draw are shown below. Numbers in parentheses after the players' names denote the players' seeding and players in bold denote match winners.

**Last 32**; Best of 11 frames
**Judd Trump (ENG) (1)**	**6**
Stephen Maguire (SCO) (25)	4
**Si Jiahui (CHN) (16)**	**6**
Ryan Day (WAL) (38)	0
**Ding Junhui (CHN) (9)**	**6**
Xu Si (CHN) (39)	4
Mark Allen (NIR) (8)	1
**Scott Donaldson (SCO) (52)**	**6**
**Mark Williams (WAL) (5)**	**6**
David Gilbert (ENG) (24)	4
Xiao Guodong (CHN) (12)	2
**Pang Junxu (CHN) (30)**	**6**
**Wu Yize (CHN) (13)**	**6**
Michael Holt (ENG) (64)	4
**Neil Robertson (AUS) (4)**	**6**
Julien Leclercq (BEL) (79)	2
Kyren Wilson (ENG) (3)	4
**Elliot Slessor (ENG) (21)**	**6**
**Barry Hawkins (ENG) (14)**	**6**
David Lilley (ENG) (51)	4
**Mark Selby (ENG) (11)**	**6**
Lei Peifan (CHN) (31)	2
Ronnie O'Sullivan (ENG) (6)	4
**Zhou Yuelong (CHN) (29)**	**6**
**John Higgins (SCO) (7)**	**6**
Ben Woollaston (ENG) (37)	2
**Shaun Murphy (ENG) (10)**	**6**
Lyu Haotian (CHN) (48)	2
Gary Wilson (ENG) (15)	5
**Zhang Anda (CHN) (23)**	**6**
**Zhao Xintong (CHN) (2)**	**6**
Long Zehuang (CHN) (54)	1

**Last 16**; Best of 11 frames
**(England) Judd Trump (1)**	**6**
(China) Si Jiahui (16)	3
**(China) Ding Junhui (9)**	**6**
(Scotland) Scott Donaldson (52)	5
(Wales) Mark Williams (5)	3
**(China) Pang Junxu (30)**	**6**
(China) Wu Yize (13)	1
**(Australia) Neil Robertson (4)**	**6**
(England) Elliot Slessor (21)	0
**(England) Barry Hawkins (14)**	**6**
**(England) Mark Selby (11)**	**6**
(China) Zhou Yuelong (29)	2
(Scotland) John Higgins (7)	5
**(England) Shaun Murphy (10)**	**6**
**(China) Zhang Anda (23)**	**6**
(China) Zhao Xintong (2)	2

**Quarter-finals**; Best of 11 frames
**(England) Judd Trump (1)**	**6**
(China) Ding Junhui (9)	2
(China) Pang Junxu (30)	4
**(Australia) Neil Robertson (4)**	**6**
(England) Barry Hawkins (14)	2
**(England) Mark Selby (11)**	**6**
**(England) Shaun Murphy (10)**	**6**
(China) Zhang Anda (23)	3

**Semi-finals**; Best of 11 frames
**(England) Judd Trump (1)**	**6**
(Australia) Neil Robertson (4)	3
**(England) Mark Selby (11)**	**6**
(England) Shaun Murphy (10)	3

**Final**; Best of 19 frames
(England) Judd Trump (1)	8
**(England) Mark Selby (11)**	**10**

=== Final: frame scores ===
Final: Best of 19 frames. Referee: Olivier Marteel; York Barbican, York, England, 7 December 2025
Judd Trump (1); England	8–**10**	**Mark Selby** (11); England
Afternoon: 54–**80**, 41–**90**, 1–**101**, 68–**70**, 1–**105** (105), **98**–7, **93**–17, 29–**70**; Evening: 7–**67**, **88**–32, **64**–34, **109**–0 (105), 1–**110**, **125**–0 (125), **68**–32, 7–**88**, **82**–31, 0–**102**
(frame 14) **125**	Highest break	105 (frame 5)
**2**	Century breaks	1

== Qualifying draw ==
The results of the qualifying draw are shown below. Numbers in parentheses after the players' names denote the players' seeding, an "a" indicates amateur players who were not on the main World Snooker Tour, and players in bold denote match winners.

**Round 1 (Last 144)**; Best of 11 frames
**Huang Jiahao (CHN) (81)**	**6**
Ethan Llewellyn (ENG) (a)	0
**Hatem Yassen (EGY) (112)**	**6**
Oliver Brown (ENG) (118)	4
**Chris Totten (SCO) (96)**	**6**
Cody Turner (NZL) (a)	2
**Reanne Evans (ENG) (97)**	**6**
Peter Lines (ENG) (a)	4
**Ian Burns (ENG) (104)**	**6**
Amaan Iqbal (SCO) (a)	0
**Dylan Emery (WAL) (89)**	**6**
Brian Cini (MLT) (a)	1
**Mateusz Baranowski (POL) (105)**	**6**
Sahil Nayyar (CAN) (124)	5
**Iulian Boiko (UKR) (88)**	**6**
Umut Dikme (GER) (a)	4
**Bulcsú Révész (HUN) (85)**	**6**
Chatchapong Nasa (THA) (115)	2
Jonas Luz (BRA) (108)	0
**Connor Benzey (ENG) (123)**	**6**
**Steven Hallworth (ENG) (92)**	**6**
Craig Steadman (ENG) (a)	1
**Bai Yulu (CHN) (101)**	**6**
Mostafa Dorgham (EGY) (a)	1
Lan Yuhao (CHN) (100)	4
**Jamie Clarke (WAL) (a)**	**6**
**Marco Fu (HKG) (93)**	**6**
Ng On-Yee (HKG) (122)	2
**Ross Muir (SCO) (109)**	**6**
Fergal Quinn (NIR) (121)	2
**Liam Pullen (ENG) (84)**	**6**
Kaylan Patel (ENG) (a)	1
**Cheung Ka Wai (HKG) (83)**	**6**
Florian Nüßle (AUT) (125)	5
**Xu Yichen (CHN) (110)**	**6**
Hammad Miah (ENG) (a)	4
**Liam Highfield** (ENG) (94)	**w/o**
Alexander Ursenbacher (SWI) (117)	w/d
**Michał Szubarczyk (POL) (99)**	**6**
Jimmy White (ENG) (120)	2
Zhao Hanyang (CHN) (102)	2
**Liam Graham (SCO) (113)**	**6**
David Grace (ENG) (91)	1
**Igor Figueiredo (BRA) (a)**	**6**
**Liu Wenwei (CHN) (107)**	**6**
Krzysztof Czapnik (POL) (a)	2
**Haydon Pinhey** (ENG) (86)	**w/o**
Mohamed Shehab (UAE) (116)	w/d
**Robbie McGuigan (NIR) (87)**	**6**
Oliver Sykes (ENG) (a)	1
**Yao Pengcheng (CHN) (106)**	**6**
Mahmoud El Hareedy (EGY) (126)	1
**Sam Craigie (ENG) (90)**	**6**
Patrick Whelan (ENG) (a)	3
Gao Yang (CHN) (103)	5
**Ashley Hugill (ENG) (a)**	**6**
Ken Doherty (IRL) (98)	3
**Simon Blackwell (ENG) (a)**	**6**
**Jiang Jun (CHN) (95)**	**6**
Mink Nutcharut (THA) (114)	0
Leone Crowley (IRL) (111)	4
**Zhou Jinhao (CHN) (a)**	**6**
**Haris Tahir (PAK) (82)**	**6**
Kreishh Gurbaxani (IND) (119)	3

**Round 2 (Last 112)**; Best of 11 frames
**Mitchell Mann (ENG) (80)**	**6**
Huang Jiahao (CHN) (81)	3
**Matthew Stevens (WAL) (49)**	**6**
Hatem Yassen (EGY) (112)	2
**Ishpreet Singh Chadha (IND) (65)**	**6**
Chris Totten (SCO) (96)	4
**Michael Holt (ENG) (64)**	**6**
Reanne Evans (ENG) (97)	5
Fan Zhengyi (CHN) (57)	5
**Ian Burns (ENG) (104)**	**6**
**Chang Bingyu (CHN) (72)**	**6**
Dylan Emery (WAL) (89)	4
**Robert Milkins (ENG) (56)**	**6**
Mateusz Baranowski (POL) (105)	2
Liam Davies (WAL) (73)	4
**Iulian Boiko (UKR) (88)**	**6**
Amir Sarkhosh (IRN) (76)	3
**Bulcsú Révész (HUN) (85)**	**6**
**Zak Surety (ENG) (53)**	**6**
Connor Benzey (ENG) (123)	0
Sunny Akani (THA) (69)	3
**Steven Hallworth (ENG) (92)**	**6**
**Liu Hongyu (CHN) (60)**	**6**
Bai Yulu (CHN) (101)	2
Mark Davis (ENG) (61)	5
**Jamie Clarke (WAL) (a)**	**6**
Wang Yuchen (HKG) (68)	3
**Marco Fu (HKG) (93)**	**6**
**Scott Donaldson (SCO) (52)**	**6**
Ross Muir (SCO) (109)	5
Farakh Ajaib (PAK) (77)	1
**Liam Pullen (ENG) (84)**	**6**
**Artemijs Žižins (LAT) (78)**	**6**
Cheung Ka Wai (HKG) (83)	3
**David Lilley (ENG) (51)**	**6**
Xu Yichen (CHN) (110)	4
Gong Chenzhi (CHN) (67)	3
**Liam Highfield (ENG) (94)**	**6**
Jordan Brown (NIR) (62)	4
**Michał Szubarczyk (POL) (99)**	**6**
Oliver Lines (ENG) (59)	3
**Liam Graham (SCO) (113)**	**6**
**Duane Jones (WAL) (70)**	**6**
Igor Figueiredo (BRA) (a)	5
**Long Zehuang (CHN) (54)**	**6**
Liu Wenwei (CHN) (107)	4
**Louis Heathcote (ENG) (75)**	**6**
Haydon Pinhey (ENG) (86)	4
**Allan Taylor (ENG) (74)**	**6**
Robbie McGuigan (NIR) (87)	4
**Robbie Williams (ENG) (55)**	**6**
Yao Pengcheng (CHN) (106)	5
Antoni Kowalski (POL) (71)	1
**Sam Craigie (ENG) (90)**	**6**
**Jamie Jones (WAL) (58)**	**6**
Ashley Hugill (ENG) (a)	3
**Sanderson Lam (ENG) (63)**	**6**
Simon Blackwell (ENG) (a)	4
Ben Mertens (BEL) (66)	5
**Jiang Jun (CHN) (95)**	**6**
**Stan Moody (ENG) (50)**	**6**
Zhou Jinhao (CHN) (a)	1
**Julien Leclercq (BEL) (79)**	**6**
Haris Tahir (PAK) (82)	5

**Round 3 (Last 80)**; Best of 11 frames
Chris Wakelin (ENG) (17)	3
**Mitchell Mann (ENG) (80)**	**6**
**Lyu Haotian (CHN) (48)**	**6**
Matthew Stevens (WAL) (49)	5
**Yuan Sijun (CHN) (32)**	**6**
Ishpreet Singh Chadha (IND) (65)	4
Jackson Page (WAL) (33)	3
**Michael Holt (ENG) (64)**	**6**
Luca Brecel (BEL) (40)	3
**Ian Burns (ENG) (104)**	**6**
**Stephen Maguire (SCO) (25)**	**6**
Chang Bingyu (CHN) (72)	5
**Daniel Wells (WAL) (41)**	**6**
Robert Milkins (ENG) (56)	5
**David Gilbert (ENG) (24)**	**6**
Iulian Boiko (UKR) (88)	5
**Elliot Slessor (ENG) (21)**	**6**
Bulcsú Révész (HUN) (85)	5
Martin O'Donnell (ENG) (44)	5
**Zak Surety (ENG) (53)**	**6**
**Joe O'Connor (ENG) (28)**	**6**
Steven Hallworth (ENG) (92)	4
**Ben Woollaston (ENG) (37)**	**6**
Liu Hongyu (CHN) (60)	2
Matthew Selt (ENG) (36)	2
**Jamie Clarke (WAL) (a)**	**6**
**Zhou Yuelong** (CHN) (29)	**w/o**
Marco Fu (HKG) (93) (Note: Marco Fu was 0–4 behind and conceded the match during the mid-session interval due to health reasons.)	w/d
Anthony McGill (SCO) (45)	1
**Scott Donaldson (SCO) (52)**	**6**
**Stuart Bingham (ENG) (20)**	**6**
Liam Pullen (ENG) (84)	5
Ali Carter (ENG) (19)	4
**Artemijs Žižins (LAT) (78)**	**6**
Ricky Walden (ENG) (46)	3
**David Lilley (ENG) (51)**	**6**
**Pang Junxu (CHN) (30)**	**6**
Liam Highfield (ENG) (94)	4
**Noppon Saengkham (THA) (35)**	**6**
Michał Szubarczyk (POL) (99)	3
**Ryan Day (WAL) (38)**	**6**
Liam Graham (SCO) (113)	1
**Hossein Vafaei (IRN) (27)**	**6**
Duane Jones (WAL) (70)	4
Aaron Hill (IRL) (43)	1
**Long Zehuang (CHN) (54)**	**6**
Jack Lisowski (ENG) (22)	2
**Louis Heathcote (ENG) (75)**	**6**
**Zhang Anda (CHN) (23)**	**6**
Allan Taylor (ENG) (74)	1
**Thepchaiya Un-Nooh (THA) (42)**	**6**
Robbie Williams (ENG) (55)	1
**Tom Ford (ENG) (26)**	**6**
Sam Craigie (ENG) (90)	2
**Xu Si (CHN) (39)**	**6**
Jamie Jones (WAL) (58)	4
**Jimmy Robertson (ENG) (34)**	**6**
Sanderson Lam (ENG) (63)	3
**Lei Peifan (CHN) (31)**	**6**
Jiang Jun (CHN) (95)	4
**He Guoqiang (CHN) (47)**	**6**
Stan Moody (ENG) (50)	3
Jak Jones (WAL) (18)	2
**Julien Leclercq (BEL) (79)**	**6**

**Round 4 (Last 48)**; Best of 11 frames
Mitchell Mann (ENG) (80)	5
**Lyu Haotian (CHN) (48)**	**6**
Yuan Sijun (CHN) (32)	3
**Michael Holt (ENG) (64)**	**6**
Ian Burns (ENG) (104)	1
**Stephen Maguire (SCO) (25)**	**6**
Daniel Wells (WAL) (41)	4
**David Gilbert (ENG) (24)**	**6**
**Elliot Slessor (ENG) (21)**	**6**
Zak Surety (ENG) (53)	4
Joe O'Connor (ENG) (28)	5
**Ben Woollaston (ENG) (37)**	**6**
Jamie Clarke (WAL) (a)	2
**Zhou Yuelong (CHN) (29)**	**6**
**Scott Donaldson (SCO) (52)**	**6**
Stuart Bingham (ENG) (20)	5
Artemijs Žižins (LAT) (78)	5
**David Lilley (ENG) (51)**	**6**
**Pang Junxu (CHN) (30)**	**6**
Noppon Saengkham (THA) (35)	2
**Ryan Day (WAL) (38)**	**6**
Hossein Vafaei (IRN) (27)	5
**Long Zehuang (CHN) (54)**	**6**
Louis Heathcote (ENG) (75)	5
**Zhang Anda (CHN) (23)**	**6**
Thepchaiya Un-Nooh (THA) (42)	4
Tom Ford (ENG) (26)	3
**Xu Si (CHN) (39)**	**6**
Jimmy Robertson (ENG) (34)	5
**Lei Peifan (CHN) (31)**	**6**
He Guoqiang (CHN) (47)	4
**Julien Leclercq (BEL) (79)**	**6**

Note: w/d=withdrawn; w/o=walkover

== Century breaks ==
=== Main stage centuries ===
A total of 35 century breaks were made during the main stage of the tournament in York.

- 138 – Barry Hawkins
- 133, 127, 115, 105, 105 – Mark Selby
- 132, 125 – Zhou Yuelong
- 131 – Shaun Murphy
- 129, 127 – Zhang Anda
- 125, 117, 105, 100 – Judd Trump
- 123 – Ronnie O'Sullivan
- 118 – Scott Donaldson
- 116, 115 – Pang Junxu
- 114, 111, 105 – Neil Robertson
- 114, 109, 109, 103 – Ding Junhui
- 112, 101 – Mark Williams
- 111 – Stephen Maguire
- 107 – Zhao Xintong
- 104, 101 – Xiao Guodong
- 104 – Kyren Wilson
- 102, 100 – David Gilbert

=== Qualifying stage centuries ===
A total of 83 century breaks were made during the qualifying stage of the tournament in Wigan.

- 147, 137, 101, 101 – Chang Bingyu
- 147 – Liam Pullen
- 144, 124, 101 – Bulcsú Révész
- 142, 115, 114 – Hossein Vafaei
- 139, 125 – Igor Figueiredo
- 138 – David Lilley
- 138 – Stephen Maguire
- 137 – Haris Tahir
- 135, 118 – Ben Woollaston
- 135 – Jordan Brown
- 134, 127, 109 – Jimmy Robertson
- 134, 102 – Jamie Jones
- 134 – Dylan Emery
- 133 – Artemijs Žižins
- 131, 104, 101 – Michael Holt
- 131, 104 – Marco Fu
- 131, 100 – Jak Jones
- 131 – Ryan Day
- 129, 120, 110 – He Guoqiang
- 129, 103 – Thepchaiya Un-Nooh
- 127, 125 – Noppon Saengkham
- 127, 111, 109 – Liam Highfield
- 127 – Tom Ford
- 126 – Long Zehuang
- 123, 122 – Lei Peifan
- 118 – Oliver Lines
- 117, 116, 114, 100 – Jiang Jun
- 117 – Stuart Bingham
- 116, 105 – Iulian Boiko
- 116 – Joe O'Connor
- 116 – Zhou Jinhao
- 114 – Sanderson Lam
- 110 – Scott Donaldson
- 109, 103 – Zhou Yuelong
- 109, 101 – Steven Hallworth
- 109 – Mitchell Mann
- 108 – Zak Surety
- 107 – Martin O'Donnell
- 106, 102 – Daniel Wells
- 106 – Gao Yang
- 106 – Michał Szubarczyk
- 105 – Cheung Ka Wai
- 105 – Elliot Slessor
- 104 – David Gilbert
- 104 – Lyu Haotian
- 104 – Amir Sarkhosh
- 103 – Julien Leclercq
- 101 – Sam Craigie
- 101 – Gong Chenzhi
- 101 – Louis Heathcote
- 100 – Ashley Hugill
- 100 – Allan Taylor
- 100 – Zhang Anda
