= 2025 Snooker Shoot Out =

Snooker tournament

2025 9Club Snooker Shoot Out

Tournament information
- Dates: 10–13 December 2025
- Venue: Tower Circus
- City: Blackpool
- Country: England
- Organisation: World Snooker Tour
- Format: Ranking event
- Total prize fund: £171,000
- Winner's share: £50,000
- Highest break: Wu Yize (CHN) (141)

Final
- Champion: Alfie Burden (ENG)
- Runner-up: Stuart Bingham (ENG)
- Score: 63–8 (one frame)

The 2025 Snooker Shoot Out (officially the 2025 9Club Snooker Shoot Out) was a professional snooker tournament that took place from 10 to 13 December 2025 at the Tower Circus in Blackpool, England, where the tournament was previously held from 2011 to 2015. The 16th consecutive edition of the tournament since it was revived in 2011, it was the 10th ranking event of the 2025‍–‍26 season, following the 2025 UK Championship and preceding the 2025 Scottish Open. It was broadcast by TNT Sports in the United Kingdom and Ireland, by Eurosport in mainland Europe, by local channels in China and elsewhere in Asia, and by WST Play in all other territories. The winner received £50,000 from a total prize fund of £171,000.

The tournament was played under a variation of the standard rules of snooker, with each match contested over a single frame, lasting a maximum of 10 minutes. Tom Ford was the defending champion, having defeated Liam Graham 31‍–‍28 in the 2024 final, but he lost 21–55 to Stuart Bingham in the fourth round. Former professional player Alfie Burden, competing in the tournament as an amateur substitute, won the first ranking title of his 30-year career by defeating Bingham 63–8 in the final. He won the title the day before his 49th birthday, making him the oldest maiden ranking event winner, surpassing Doug Mountjoy, who had won the 1988 UK Championship at age 46. Burden was the second player to win a ranking title while competing as an amateur, following Zhao Xintong at the 2025 World Snooker Championship.

The tournament produced four century breaks, the highest of which was a 141 by Wu Yize in the first round. Wu's century was the third-highest break in the history of the event.

== Overview ==
The tournament was the seventeenth edition of the Snooker Shoot Out, first held as a non‑ranking event in 1990 before being revived in 2011 and since then having been held annually. It was promoted to a ranking event starting with the 2017 edition. Tom Ford was the defending champion, having defeated Liam Graham 31‍–‍28 in the 2024 final.

=== Format ===
The tournament was played using a variation of the traditional snooker rules. The draw was randomised before each round. All matches were played over a single frame, each of which lasted up to 10 minutes. The event featured a variable shot clock; players were allowed 15 seconds per shot during the first five minutes and 10 seconds per shot during the final five minutes. The player with the most points after the time runs out or after all balls have been pocketed (or after a foul on the final black) won the match. All foul shots resulted in the opponent receiving a ball in hand. Unlike traditional snooker, a foul was called if a ball did not either hit a cushion or enter a pocket on every shot. Rather than a coin toss, a lag was used to determine which player broke off. In the event of a draw, the frame would be decided by a "blue ball shootout". With the cue ball placed inside the "D" and the blue ball on its spot, the players took alternate shots until one player had potted the blue more times than their opponent from an equal number of attempts.

=== Amateur nominations ===
The World Professional Billiards and Snooker Association nominated the following eight amateur players to participate in the tournament, alongside other amateurs and professionals:

- Vladislav Gradinari, English Under-18 Champion
- Riley Powell, Welsh Under-18 Champion
- Steven Wardropper, Scottish Under-18 Champion
- Jack O’Brien, Irish Under-18 Champion
- Kaylan Patel, 2025 WSF Junior Championship Runner-Up
- Ethan Llewellyn, 2025 EBSA European Under-18 Championship Runner-Up
- Ellise Scott, ranked first in the World Women's Snooker Under-21 list
- Joel Connolly, Northern Ireland Under-21 Champion

=== Broadcasters ===
The tournament was broadcast in the United Kingdom and Ireland by TNT Sports and Discovery+. It was broadcast in mainland Europe by Eurosport, with streaming coverage on Discovery+ in Germany, Italy, and Austria and on HBO Max in other European territories. It was broadcast in mainland China by the CBSA‑WPBSA Academy WeChat Channel, the CBSA‑WPBSA Academy Douyin, Huya Live, and Migu. It was broadcast in Hong Kong by Now TV, in Thailand by TrueSports, in Malaysia & Brunei by Astro SuperSport, in Taiwan by Sportcast, and in the Philippines by TAP Sports. In territories where no other coverage was available, the tournament was streamed by WST Play.

=== Prize fund ===
The prize fund for the tournament is shown below:

- Winner: £50,000
- Runner-up: £20,000
- Semi-final: £8,000
- Quarter-final: £4,000
- Last 16: £2,000
- Last 32: £1,000
- Last 64: £500
- Last 128: £250
- Highest break: £5,000
- Total: £171,000

== Summary ==
=== Round one (last 128) ===
The first-round matches were played on 10 and 11 December. The defending champion Tom Ford defeated Martin O'Donnell by nine points. "Getting the first win on the board definitely settles your nerves," said Ford afterwards. "I think quickly and I usually know what I'm doing before the white stops rolling so that's why this event suits me." Michael Holt, winner in 2020 and runner-up in 2019, trailed Ashley Hugill by seven points with 45 seconds remaining. He snookered Hugill, who then committed a time foul, allowing Holt to pot a red and a pink to win. The victory was controversial, as bleeps did not sound to warn Hugill that the shot clock was about to expire. Alfie Burden, who secured a place in the event that morning when Alex Clenshaw withdrew, faced David Lilley after a four-hour drive from London. Burden came from 46 points behind to win the match with a 49 break. Luca Brecel won his first professional match since September as he defeated Long Zehuang. Brecel said afterwards: "I felt very calm, in control of the game and potted some good balls. In this event you just have to pot balls and don't do stupid things."

Shaun Murphy, the only player in the event's history to make a maximum break, potted five reds and five blacks before missing the sixth red. He later made another break of 51 to secure victory over Patrick Whelan. "Not everything has to be hard work and super-serious all the time," Murphy said. "It's great to come here and have interaction with the crowd, like a big exhibition. I love it!" Ishpreet Singh Chadha trailed Dean Young by 11 points with 50 seconds remaining. Young missed a red, and Chadha potted two reds and two blacks to secure victory. David Gilbert made a 106 break as he beat Matthew Stevens, and Sanderson Lam made a 105 to defeat Jonas Luz.

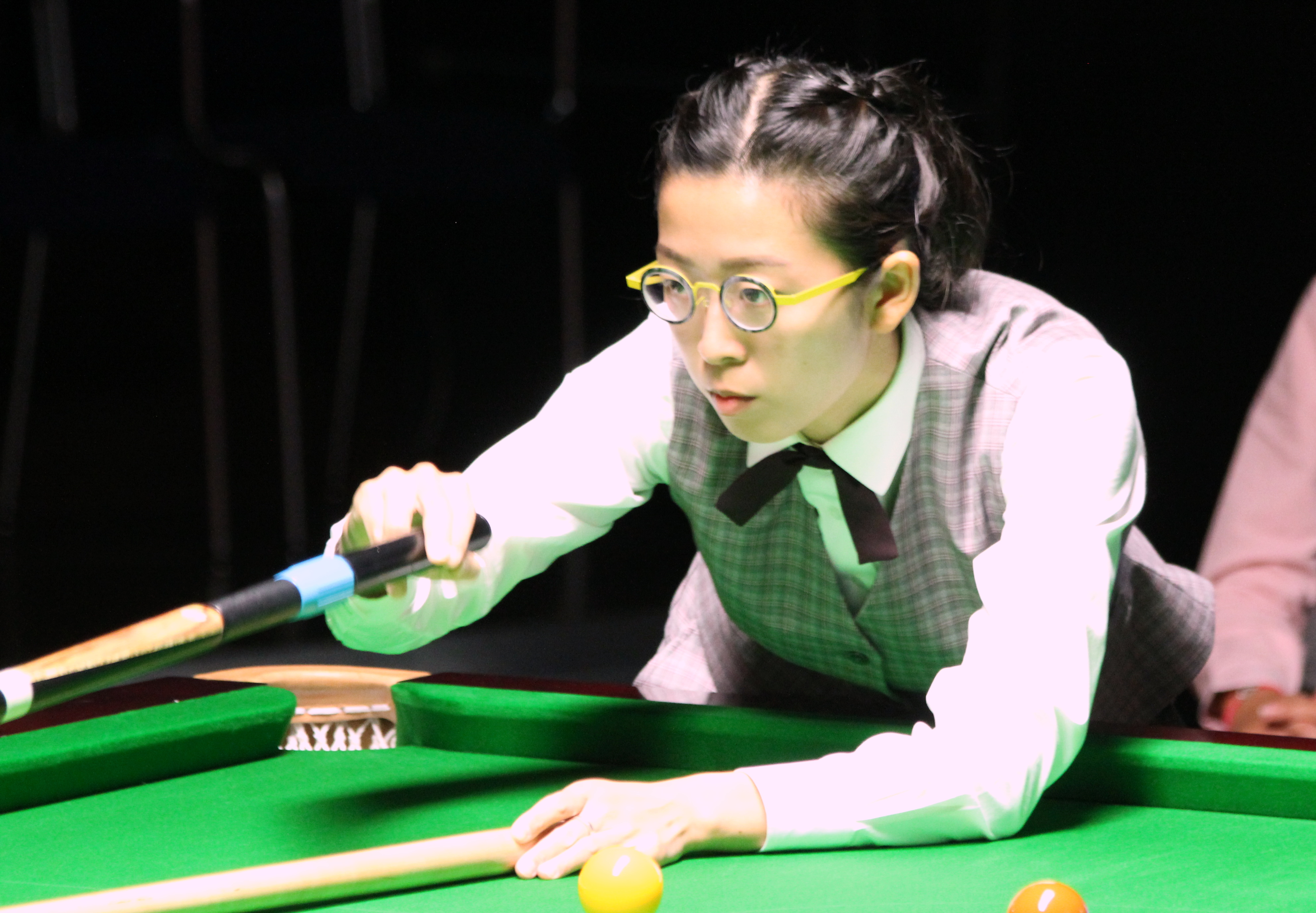
Ng On-yee (pictured in 2017) defeated the world number nine Mark Allen. She was the first woman to beat a top-10 player at a ranking event.

Ng On-yee made a 25 break to move 16 points ahead of the world number nine Mark Allen, winner of the December 2023 event. In the last seconds, Allen potted two reds and two pinks but missed a plant; Ng won the match, becoming the first woman to beat a top-10 player at a ranking event. She said afterwards: "I hope it helps people realise this is not just a male sport. Women can play snooker too and hopefully there will be more to join our sport." Ellise Scott, aged 14, attempted to become the youngest female player to win a match at a ranking event. She led the reigning World Women's Champion Bai Yulu by two points with less than a minute remaining, but Bai secured victory after Scott missed a shot with the rest. Wu Yize made a 141 total clearance against Craig Steadman, the third-highest break in the tournament's history. The reigning World Champion Zhao Xintong led Ross Muir by eight points with two minutes remaining, but Muir won the match with a break of 15 after Zhao missed a red. The previous year's runner-up Liam Graham defeated Cheung Ka Wai, saying afterwards: "This format really suits me, I play fast and I enjoy the buzz and the crowd." Michał Szubarczyk, aged 14 and playing in his debut season on the tour, defeated Jamie Jones.

Sahil Nayyar, playing in his first season on the professional tour, defeated Antoni Kowalski. Having trailed by one point with two minutes remaining, Nayyar potted a red and a blue to move ahead, securing victory after Kowalski missed a red. It was his second win on the professional tour. "It was nerve-wracking but I enjoyed it," Nayyar said afterwards. "When I was preparing I just tried to see the ball and hit it fast, go for it and whatever happens will happen." Amateur player Zachary Richardson trailed the world number 15 Si Jiahui 8–26 but won the match with a 59 break, becoming one of ten amateur players to reach the last 64. "I am really pleased by how I took the opportunity," he said. "It was a really good experience." Stephen Maguire lost to Farakh Ajaib, and former winner Anthony McGill lost to Liam Davies. Stuart Bingham made a 76 break to defeat Jack O'Brien.

=== Round two (last 64) ===
The second-round matches were played on 12 December. Stan Moody trailed Lan Yuhao by 42 points with two minutes and four reds remaining but cleared to the pink to win the match. "I'm still shaking, I thought I was out," said Moody afterwards. "It was amazing at the end when the crowd were chanting my name. I love getting them involved and having some fun." From 52 points behind against Ricky Walden, Liam Highfield made breaks of 38 and 15, moving one point in front. With seconds remaining, Walden missed a cut on the yellow to a baulk pocket, and Highfield secured victory. Oliver Lines came from 36 points behind to beat Chang Bingyu, while the defending champion Ford defeated Jimmy Robertson, and Gilbert beat Wu. Belgian players Ben Mertens and Julien Leclercq advanced with victories over Graham and Szubarczyk respectively.

Ng took a 51–0 lead over Aaron Hill, who responded with a break of 45. Ng secured victory after Hill missed the last red to a baulk pocket with ten seconds remaining. She reached the last 32 of a ranking event for the second time that season, having previously reached that stage at the 2025 Championship League. "I'm very happy to win a couple of matches and it helps me just to play against the likes of [Allen] and [Hill]," she said afterwards. "In practice I have tried to be decisive, getting down on the shot and committing to it." Brecel made a 52 break to beat Murphy. Muir trailed Liu Hongyu 34–60 with a minute remaining but made a clearance to win the match, potting the black with just five seconds left.

Mitchell Mann trailed Stuart Carrington by two points with 30 seconds left but won the match after Carrington fouled the blue while playing a safety shot. Jackson Page recovered from 28 points behind to defeat Holt. Bulcsú Révész secured his first appearance in the last 32 of a ranking event as he beat Davies. Kaylan Patel, a 17-year-old amateur, defeated fellow amateur Kayden Brierley and paid tribute afterwards to practice partner Ben Woollaston, who he said had helped him improve as a player. Amir Sarkhosh defeated Nayyar with an 85 break, and Burden also made an 85 break as he beat Chadha. Elliot Slessor made a break of 57 as he advanced with a win over amateur Paul Deaville.

=== Round three (last 32) ===
The third-round matches were played on 13 December. Five amateur players, Ethan Llewellyn, Patel, Halim Hussain, Richardson, and Burden reached the last 16. Llewellyn, playing the day before his 18th birthday, defeated Ryan Day. "It's unbelievable, I just came here for the experience but I have played well," he said "I am getting more shaky as the day goes on but hopefully I can hold it together tonight." Patel defeated Révész, while Richardson beat Mann and Hussain defeated Oliver Brown. Burden defeated Gary Wilson, eliminating the last top-16 player from the event. Defending champion Ford won his 10th consecutive Shoot Out match, beating Gilbert. Brecel lost to Fan Zhengyi, who made a break of 75. Moody defeated Ng, and Bingham made a 74 break to beat Lam. Iulian Boiko defeated Lines after Lines missed a red to a corner pocket with two minutes remaining.

=== Round four (last 16) ===
The fourth-round matches were played on 13 December. In a match between two amateurs, Richardson defeated Patel. Mertens defeated Hussain, reaching the quarter-finals of a ranking event for the second time in his career. After a foul by Llewellyn, Yuan Sijun made a century of 126 to advance. Boiko defeated Slessor after Slessor fouled by failing to hit a cushion with any ball, a rule unique to the Shoot Out format. Facing Burden, Highfield led by five points with a minute remaining but missed a blue, and Burden won the match. Fan failed to score a single point against Page, who advanced with a 68–0 victory. Bingham came from 21 points behind to beat the defending champion Ford 55–21. Moody took a 31-point lead over Noppon Saengkham, but Saengkham recovered to win the match 43–36.

=== Quarter-finals ===
The quarter-finals were played on 13 December. Bingham made a half-century break as he defeated Page 73–0. In the match between Yuan and Boiko, only one point was scored in the first five minutes; Boiko eventually won the match 28–18. Saengkham defeated Mertens, who conceded while trailing by 30 points with a minute remaining. Burden defeated fellow amateur Richardson 42–7 after a number of missed pots by Richardson.

=== Semi-finals ===
The semi-finals were played on 13 December. Boiko took a 26-point lead over Bingham, but Bingham recovered to lead by 13. Bingham won the match 44–35 after Boiko, with 40 seconds to go, missed the pink to a centre pocket. Saengkham took a 14-point lead over Burden, but Burden recovered to make a match-winning break of 73.

=== Final ===
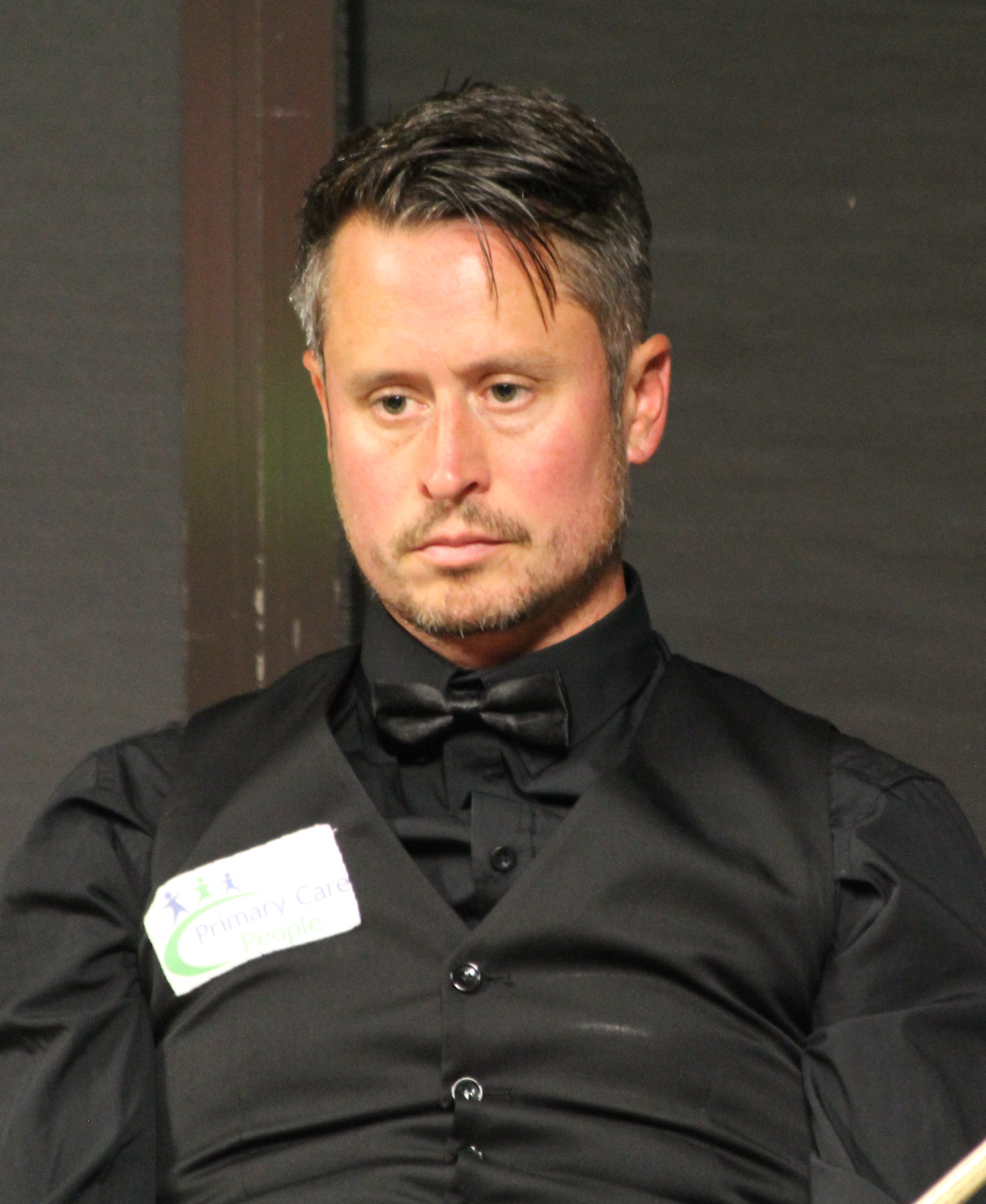
Alfie Burden (pictured in 2016) defeated Stuart Bingham in the final to win his maiden ranking title.

The final was played on 13 December between Burden and Bingham. Burden was playing in the final of the event for the first time, while Bingham had been runner-up at the 2014 edition, prior to the tournament becoming a ranking event. Bingham had the first scoring opportunity in the final, but missed a red on a break of 6, and Burden moved ahead with a half-century of 56. Bingham then had another scoring opportunity and potted a red, but conceded the match after missing the blue. Burden secured the maiden ranking title of his career, having never previously advanced beyond the quarter-finals of a ranking event. He won the title the day before his 49th birthday, making him the oldest first-time ranking event winner, surpassing Doug Mountjoy, who had won the 1988 UK Championship at age 46. He became the second player to win a ranking title while competing as an amateur, following Zhao Xintong at the 2025 World Snooker Championship. The £50,000 first prize was the largest prize he had ever received in snooker.

"I can't believe I have won it," said Burden afterwards. "From the start I have played well. Everything fell into place for me. I am a ranking event winner now and that is something I am very proud of. After dropping off the tour last season, I found myself in the wilderness. I have had no motivation to play on the Q Tour, I turned up for a few events in terrible shape having not practised. Then a couple of weeks ago I went to the one in Bulgaria with a new cue and got to the semi-finals. Now I am hoping this win will get me back on the tour." Runner-up Bingham praised his opponent, saying "He looked so cool and calm all the way through. He played brilliantly from the start."

== Tournament draw ==
All times in Greenwich Mean Time. Times for quarter‑finals, semi‑finals and final are approximate. Players in bold denote match winners and an (a) denotes amateur players not currently on the World Snooker Tour. Match results as follows:

=== Round 1 ===
==== 10 December – 13:00 ====
- Martin O'Donnell (ENG) 25–**34** **Tom Ford** (ENG)
- Chatchapong Nasa (THA) 20–**54** **Stan Moody** (ENG)
- Zhang Anda (CHN) 25–**32** **Julien Leclercq** (BEL)
- **Ethan Llewellyn** (ENG) (a) **63**–5 Yao Pengcheng (CHN)
- Jiang Jun (CHN) 1–**32** **Robbie McGuigan** (NIR)
- **Stuart Carrington** (ENG) (a) **19**–8 Zhao Hanyang (CHN)
- Mark Davis (ENG) 25–**36** **Pang Junxu** (CHN)
- **Michael Holt** (ENG) **43**–39 Ashley Hugill (ENG) (a)
- Leone Crowley (IRL) 17–**39** **Amir Sarkhosh** (IRN)
- **Ricky Walden** (ENG) **48**–34 Ryan Davies (ENG) (a)
- Dylan Emery (WAL) 24–**70** **Mitchell Mann** (ENG)
- Steven Wardropper (SCO) (a) 16–**73** **Florian Nüßle** (AUT)
- **Lan Yuhao** (CHN) **52**–37 Joel Connolly (NIR) (a)
- Mateusz Baranowski (POL) 13–**41** **Ken Doherty** (IRL)
- Long Zehuang (CHN) 11–**60** **Luca Brecel** (BEL)
- David Lilley (ENG) 46–**49** **Alfie Burden** (ENG) (a) (Note: Ali Carter withdrew and was replaced by Alex Clenshaw, who also withdrew and was replaced by Alfie Burden.)

==== 10 December – 19:00 ====
- **Xu Yichen** (CHN) **72**–3 Thepchaiya Un-Nooh (THA)
- **David Gilbert** (ENG) **134**–0 Matthew Stevens (WAL)
- Ashley Carty (ENG) (a) 7–**70** **Bulcsú Révész** (HUN)
- **Ishpreet Singh Chadha** (IND) **48**–43 Dean Young (SCO) (a)
- Joe O'Connor (ENG) 0–**89** **Duane Jones** (WAL)
- Fergal Quinn (NIR) 0–**64** **Jordan Brown** (NIR)
- Ben Woollaston (ENG) 30–**55** **Ben Mertens** (BEL)
- **Shaun Murphy** (ENG) **91**–8 Patrick Whelan (ENG) (a)
- Umut Dikme (GER) (a) 8–**90** **Ryan Day** (WAL)
- **Elliot Slessor** (ENG) **91**–1 Louis Heathcote (ENG)
- Haydon Pinhey (ENG) 8–**89** **Allan Taylor** (ENG)
- **Jimmy Robertson** (ENG) **33**–1 Matthew Selt (ENG)
- **Iulian Boiko** (UKR) **38**–2 Hatem Yassen (EGY)
- **Sanderson Lam** (ENG) **105**–8 Jonas Luz (BRA)
- Mahmoud El Hareedy (EGY) 16–**95** **Gary Wilson** (ENG)
- Jack Bradford (WAL) (a) 0–**89** **Zhou Yuelong** (CHN) (Note: Chris Wakelin withdrew and was replaced by Jack Bradford.)

==== 11 December – 13:00 ====
- **Wu Yize** (CHN) **141**–0 Craig Steadman (ENG) (a) (Note: Marco Fu withdrew and was replaced by Craig Steadman.)
- **Chang Bingyu** (CHN) **72**–15 Liam Pullen (ENG)
- **Yuan Sijun** (CHN) **75**–17 Gong Chenzhi (CHN)
- **Noppon Saengkham** (THA) **49**–25 Xu Si (CHN)
- Cheung Ka Wai (HKG) 1–**66** **Liam Graham** (SCO)
- **Halim Hussain** (ENG) (a) **24**–19 Vladislav Gradinari (MDA) (a) (Note: Artemijs Žižins withdrew and was replaced by Halim Hussain.)
- **Ross Muir** (SCO) **34**–21 Zhao Xintong (CHN)
- **Ng On-yee** (HKG) **37**–34 Mark Allen (NIR)
- Alfie Davies (WAL) (a) 26–**61** **Fan Zhengyi** (CHN) (Note: Lyu Haotian withdrew and was replaced by Alfie Davies.)
- **Paul Deaville** (ENG) (a) **15**–1 Huang Jiahao (CHN) (Note: Jak Jones withdrew and was replaced by Paul Deaville.)
- **Riley Powell** (WAL) (a) **50**–26 Daniel Wells (WAL)
- **Michał Szubarczyk** (POL) **29**–8 Jamie Jones (WAL)
- Wang Yuchen (HKG) 0–**69** **Kaylan Patel** (ENG) (a)
- Ellise Scott (ENG) (a) 26–**40** **Bai Yulu** (CHN)
- **Simon Blackwell** (ENG) (a) **51**–3 Reanne Evans (ENG) (Note: Mohammed Shehab withdrew and was replaced by Simon Blackwell.)
- **Jackson Page** (WAL) **65**–23 Gary Thomson (SCO) (a) (Note: Lei Peifan withdrew and was replaced by Gary Thomson.)

==== 11 December – 19:00 ====
- **Oliver Brown** (ENG) **29**–13 Jimmy White (ENG)
- **Stuart Bingham** (ENG) **76**–1 Jack O'Brien (IRL) (a)
- Chris Totten (SCO) 21–**52** **Connor Benzey** (ENG)
- Ian Burns (ENG) 0–**41** **Liam Highfield** (ENG)
- **Gao Yang** (CHN) **48**–18 Steven Hallworth (ENG)
- He Guoqiang (CHN) 25–**37** **David Grace** (ENG)
- **Aaron Hill** (IRL) **47**–18 Liu Wenwei (CHN)
- Stephen Maguire (SCO) 14–**49** **Farakh Ajaib** (PAK)
- **Liam Davies** (WAL) **40**–13 Anthony McGill (SCO)
- Antoni Kowalski (POL) 9–**15** **Sahil Nayyar** (CAN)
- **Oliver Lines** (ENG) **49**–28 Mark Lloyd (ENG) (a)
- Robert Milkins (ENG) 22–**42** **Liu Hongyu** (CHN)
- **Zak Surety** (ENG) **47**–30 Kreishh Gurbaxani (IND)
- Daniel Womersley (ENG) (a) 1–**85** **Kayden Brierley** (ENG) (a) (Note: Alexander Ursenbacher withdrew and was replaced by Kayden Brierley.)
- **Zachary Richardson** (ENG) (a) **67**–26 Si Jiahui (CHN) (Note: Sam Craigie withdrew and was replaced by Zachary Richardson.)
- **Hossein Vafaei** (IRN) **45**–10 Haris Tahir (PAK)

=== Round 2 ===
==== 12 December – 13:00 ====
- **Sanderson Lam** (ENG) **55**–41 Ken Doherty (IRL)
- **Liam Highfield** (ENG) **55**–52 Ricky Walden (ENG)
- Allan Taylor (ENG) 0–**72** **Zhou Yuelong** (CHN)
- **Gary Wilson** (ENG) **81**–0 Florian Nüßle (AUT)
- **Ryan Day** (WAL) **78**–28 Duane Jones (WAL)
- **Ben Mertens** (BEL) **36**–23 Liam Graham (SCO)
- **Julien Leclercq** (BEL) **31**–17 Michał Szubarczyk (POL)
- Lan Yuhao (CHN) 52–**60** **Stan Moody** (ENG)
- **Stuart Bingham** (ENG) **55**–30 Simon Blackwell (ENG) (a)
- **Oliver Lines** (ENG) **47**–37 Chang Bingyu (CHN)
- Connor Benzey (ENG) 0–**72** **Noppon Saengkham** (THA)
- **Pang Junxu** (CHN) **43**–7 Jordan Brown (NIR)
- Jimmy Robertson (ENG) 15–**49** **Tom Ford** (ENG)
- **Iulian Boiko** (UKR) **55**–25 Xu Yichen (CHN)
- **Robbie McGuigan** (NIR) **66**–8 Hossein Vafaei (IRN)
- **David Gilbert** (ENG) **47**–42 Wu Yize (CHN)

==== 12 December – 19:00 ====
- Michael Holt (ENG) 29–**71** **Jackson Page** (WAL)
- Liam Davies (WAL) 9–**52** **Bulcsú Révész** (HUN)
- Kayden Brierley (ENG) (a) 24–**46** **Kaylan Patel** (ENG) (a)
- **Mitchell Mann** (ENG) **21**–17 Stuart Carrington (ENG) (a)
- Riley Powell (WAL) (a) 17–**33** **Ethan Llewellyn** (ENG) (a)
- **Yuan Sijun** (CHN) **14**–9 Farakh Ajaib (PAK)
- **Elliot Slessor** (ENG) **76**–6 Paul Deaville (ENG) (a)
- Sahil Nayyar (CAN) 11–**85** **Amir Sarkhosh** (IRN)
- David Grace (ENG) 2–**57** **Halim Hussain** (ENG) (a)
- Zak Surety (ENG) 14–**90** **Fan Zhengyi** (CHN)
- Ishpreet Singh Chadha (IND) 28–**85** **Alfie Burden** (ENG) (a)
- **Ross Muir** (SCO) **65**–60 Liu Hongyu (CHN)
- **Oliver Brown** (ENG) **59**–17 Bai Yulu (CHN)
- Aaron Hill (IRL) 45–**51** **Ng On-yee** (HKG)
- Gao Yang (CHN) 23–**41** **Zachary Richardson** (ENG) (a)
- Shaun Murphy (ENG) 0–**70** **Luca Brecel** (BEL)

=== Round 3 ===
==== 13 December – 13:00 ====
- **Stan Moody** (ENG) **85**–30 Ng On-yee (HKG)
- **Elliot Slessor** (ENG) **30**–28 Ross Muir (SCO)
- **Ben Mertens** (BEL) **48**–21 Robbie McGuigan (NIR)
- Gary Wilson (ENG) 21–**62** **Alfie Burden** (ENG) (a)
- **Jackson Page** (WAL) **74**–5 Pang Junxu (CHN)
- Bulcsú Révész (HUN) 2–**15** **Kaylan Patel** (ENG) (a)
- Ryan Day (WAL) 11–**54** **Ethan Llewellyn** (ENG) (a)
- Zhou Yuelong (CHN) 8–**75** **Noppon Saengkham** (THA)
- **Yuan Sijun** (CHN) **75**–36 Julien Leclercq (BEL)
- Mitchell Mann (ENG) 18–**52** **Zachary Richardson** (ENG) (a)
- Sanderson Lam (ENG) 15–**76** **Stuart Bingham** (ENG)
- Luca Brecel (BEL) 0–**75** **Fan Zhengyi** (CHN)
- **Iulian Boiko** (UKR) **54**–34 Oliver Lines (ENG)
- Oliver Brown (ENG) 26–**33** **Halim Hussain** (ENG) (a)
- **Liam Highfield** (ENG) **91**–21 Amir Sarkhosh (IRN)
- David Gilbert (ENG) 35–**53** **Tom Ford** (ENG)

=== Round 4 ===
==== 13 December – 19:00 ====
- Kaylan Patel (ENG) (a) 28–**44** **Zachary Richardson** (ENG) (a)
- **Ben Mertens** (BEL) **74**–49 Halim Hussain (ENG) (a)
- **Yuan Sijun** (CHN) **131**–7 Ethan Llewellyn (ENG) (a)
- Elliot Slessor (ENG) 17–**35** **Iulian Boiko** (UKR)
- **Alfie Burden** (ENG) (a) **42**–23 Liam Highfield (ENG)
- **Jackson Page** (WAL) **68**–0 Fan Zhengyi (CHN)
- Tom Ford (ENG) 21–**55** **Stuart Bingham** (ENG)
- **Noppon Saengkham** (THA) **50**–36 Stan Moody (ENG)

=== Quarter-finals ===
==== 13 December – 21:00 ====
- Jackson Page (WAL) 0–**73** **Stuart Bingham** (ENG)
- Yuan Sijun (CHN) 18–**28** **Iulian Boiko** (UKR)
- **Noppon Saengkham** (THA) **44**–14 Ben Mertens (BEL)
- Zachary Richardson (ENG) (a) 7–**42** **Alfie Burden** (ENG) (a)

=== Semi-finals ===
==== 13 December – 22:00 ====
- **Stuart Bingham** (ENG) **44**–35 Iulian Boiko (UKR)
- **Alfie Burden** (ENG) (a) **79**–14 Noppon Saengkham (THA)

=== Final ===
Final: 1 frame. Referee: Natalia Gradinari; Tower Circus, Blackpool, England, 13 December 2025
Stuart Bingham; England	8–**63**	**Alfie Burden** (a); England

== Century breaks ==
A total of four century breaks were made in the tournament.

- 141 – Wu Yize
- 126 – Yuan Sijun
- 106 – David Gilbert
- 105 – Sanderson Lam
