= International Open Series =

Tournament information
- Venue: World Snooker Centre
- Location: Prestatyn
- Country: Wales
- Established: 2001
- Organisation(s): WPBSA (2001/02); EASB (2002/03–2009/10)
- Format: Professional (2001/02); Pro-am (2002/03); Amateur (2003/04–2009/10)
- Final year: 2010
- Final champion: (England) Jack Lisowski

The International Open Series (often referred to as Pontins International Open Series or PIOS for sponsorship reasons), was a series of snooker tournaments that ran from the 2001–02 season until the 2009–10 season. It was originally called the Open Tour but was renamed in 2005. The tour was established to provide players not on the Main Tour or the minor Challenge Tour (now WPBSA Q Tour) with some degree of professional competition, and the best performers were initially promoted to the Challenge Tour.

The series was abandoned after the 2009–10 season and replaced by Q School in the 2010–11 season.

== History ==
It was organised by the World Professional Billiards and Snooker Association (WPBSA) during its first season, but the English Association of Snooker and Billiards (EASB), an amateur body, took it over from the 2002–03 season. The event was open to professionals, amateurs and international players for the first couple of seasons, but following the EASB's split from the WPBSA in 2003 the entry criteria were revised barring professional and non-English players from entering.

After the Challenge Tour was discontinued, the entry criteria were revised again to allow international amateur players to compete, and from the 2005–06 season the competition promoted players directly to the Main Tour.

== Event finals ==
Season	Event	Winner	Runner-up	Final score
WPBSA Open Tour (professional non-ranking)
2001/02	Event 1	(England) Mark Gray	(England) Shaun Murphy	5–2
2001/02	Event 2	(England) Brian Morgan	(Republic of Ireland) Leo Fernandez	5–2
2001/02	Event 3	(Finland) Robin Hull	(Republic of Ireland) Colm Gilcreest	5–4
2001/02	Event 4	(England) Matthew Couch	(England) Munraj Pal	5–3
2001/02	Event 5	(England) Lee Spick	(England) Mark Gray	5–3
2001/02	Event 6	(England) Stuart Bingham	(England) Matthew Selt	5–4
EASB Open Tour (pro-am)
2002/03	Event 1	(Wales) Ryan Day	(Wales) James Reynolds	5–4
2002/03	Event 2	(Wales) Ryan Day	(England) Mark Gray	5–3
2002/03	Event 3	(England) Rory McLeod	(England) Mark Gray	5–2
2002/03	Event 4	(England) Ricky Walden	(England) Jamie Cope	5–1
EASB Open Tour (amateur)
2003/04	Event 1	(England) David KL Taylor	(England) Darren McVicar	4–3
2003/04	Event 2	(England) James Tatton	(England) Lee Richardson	4–2
2003/04	Event 3	(England) Lee Richardson	(England) Jamie Barratt	4–0
2003/04	Event 4	(England) Sean Bullock	(England) Andy Radford	4–0
2003/04	Event 5	(England) Andy Radford	(England) Mark Sutton	4–0
2003/04	Event 6	(England) Eddie Cooper	(England) Nick Spelman	4–2
2003/04	Event 7	(England) Alan Trigg	(England) Wayne Cooper	4–1
2003/04	Event 8	(England) Paul Davison	(England) Wayne Cooper	4–2
2003/04	Final play-off	(England) Wayne Cooper	(England) Nick Spelman	5–1
Pontins International Open Series (amateur)
2005/06	Event 1	(China) Tian Pengfei	(England) Martin Gould	6–3
2005/06	Event 2	(England) Mark Joyce	(England) James Leadbetter	6–3
2005/06	Event 3	(China) Liu Song	(England) Stephen Rowlings	6–1
2005/06	Event 4	(Republic of Ireland) Colm Gilcreest	(England) Mark Joyce	6–3
2005/06	Event 5	(England) Chris Melling	(England) Paul Davison	6–5
2005/06	Event 6	(China) Liu Song	(England) Paul Davison	6–3
2005/06	Event 7	(China) Tian Pengfei	(China) Liu Song	6–3
2005/06	Event 8	(England) Andrew Higginson	(England) Jamie O'Neill	6–3
2006/07	Event 1	(England) Munraj Pal	(Norway) Kurt Maflin	6–3
2006/07	Event 2	(Northern Ireland) Julian Logue	(England) Alex Davies	6–5
2006/07	Event 3	(Republic of Ireland) Leo Fernandez	(Wales) Lee Walker	6–5
2006/07	Event 4	(England) Kuldesh Johal	(Wales) Lee Walker	6–4
2006/07	Event 5	(Norway) Kurt Maflin	(England) Ashley Wright	6–3
2006/07	Event 6	(England) Jamie O'Neill	(England) Ashley Wright	6–2
2006/07	Event 7	(Belgium) Bjorn Haneveer	(England) Craig Steadman	6–2
2006/07	Event 8	(Scotland) James McBain	(Norway) Kurt Maflin	6–4
2007/08	Event 1	(England) Simon Bedford	(England) Gary Wilkinson	6–3
2007/08	Event 2	(England) Kuldesh Johal	(Wales) Andrew Pagett	6–4
2007/08	Event 3	(England) Paul Davison	(England) Michael King	6–2
2007/08	Event 4	(England) Matthew Couch	(England) Michael Wild	6–3
2007/08	Event 5	(England) Peter Lines	(Wales) Daniel Wells	6–5
2007/08	Event 6	(England) Kuldesh Johal	(England) Simon Bedford	6–5
2007/08	Event 7	(Wales) Jamie Jones	(England) Peter Lines	6–2
2007/08	Event 8	(England) Liam Highfield	(England) Justin Astley	6–2
2008/09	Event 1	(Belgium) Bjorn Haneveer	(England) Andrew Atkinson	6–2
2008/09	Event 2	(China) Xiao Guodong	(Thailand) Noppadol Sangnil	6–5
2008/09	Event 3	(Pakistan) Shokat Ali	(Wales) Michael White	6–3
2008/09	Event 4	(England) Craig Steadman	(England) Mike Hallett	6–1
2008/09	Event 5	(England) Chris Norbury	(England) Alfie Burden	6–2
2008/09	Event 6	(China) Xiao Guodong	(England) Jack Lisowski	6–0
2008/09	Event 7	(Thailand) Thepchaiya Un-Nooh	(England) Lee Page	6–3
2008/09	Event 8	(England) Joe Jogia	(England) Ben Woollaston	6–5
2009/10	Event 1	(England) Jack Lisowski	(England) Liam Highfield	6–5
2009/10	Event 2	(England) Liam Highfield	(England) Neal Jones	6–2
2009/10	Event 3	(England) Paul Davison	(England) Kyren Wilson	6–4
2009/10	Event 4	(Wales) Jamie Jones	(Wales) Jak Jones	6–0
2009/10	Event 5	(Scotland) Anthony McGill	(England) Farakh Ajaib	6–0
2009/10	Event 6	(England) Kyren Wilson	(England) Liam Highfield	6–4
2009/10	Event 7	(England) Paul Davison	(England) Justin Astley	6–2
2009/10	Event 8	(England) Jack Lisowski	(England) Justin Astley	6–1

== Order of Merit winners ==
Season	Winner
2005/06	(China) Liu Song
2006/07	(Norway) Kurt Maflin
2007/08	(England) Kuldesh Johal
2008/09	(England) Joe Jogia
2009/10	(England) Jack Lisowski

== See also ==
- Pontins Open – predecessor of the tournament in pro-am format
