= EPSB =

EPSB may refer to:

- Evangeline Parish School Board, school board in Evangeline Parish, Louisiana
- Edmonton Public School Board, public school division in Edmonton, Alberta
- English Partnership for Snooker and Billiards, governance body for snooker in England
