= Ellise Scott =

English snooker player

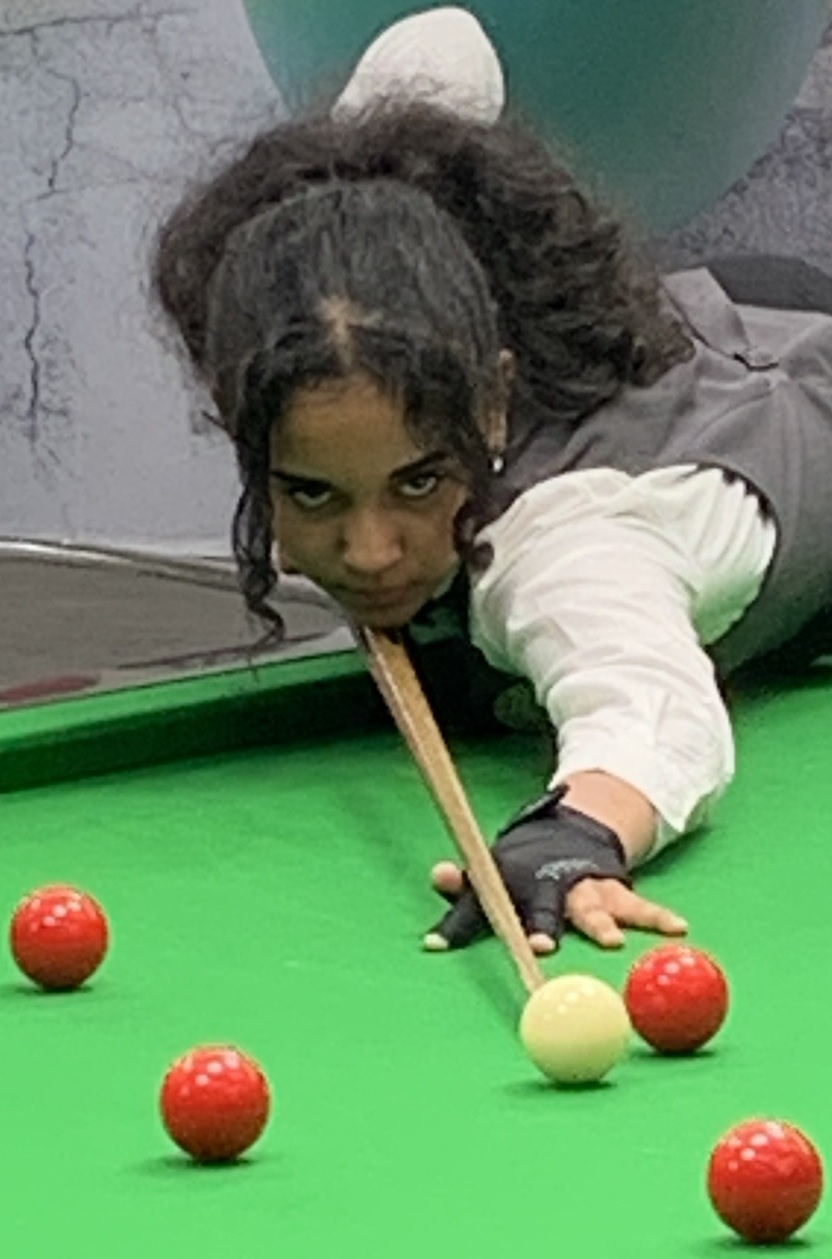
- Scott in 2024

Personal information
- Born: c. 2011

Sport
- Country: England
- Sport: Snooker

Ellise Scott (born c. 2011) is an English snooker player. She has won three World Women's Snooker Tour under-21 titles. In March 2025, she became the top-ranked player on the World Women's Snooker Tour under-21 rankings and retained that placing until October. At the 2025 EBSA European Snooker Championship she reached the semi-finals of the individual women's tournament, and, with Rebecca Kenna, won the Women's Team Championship.

== Biography ==
Ellise Scott was born c. 2011. She started playing snooker aged six, on her grandparents' snooker table. In July 2025 she said that her "passion for snooker" started while travelling to tournaments with her older brother O'Shay, who also plays snooker competitively. She is coached by Tim Dunkley.

Her first tournament on the World Women's Snooker (WWS) tour was the 2022 Eden Masters. She lost all three of her group matches in the main competition, and in the under-21 event she defeated Laura Killington before losing to Zoe Killington in the semi-finals.

At the 2023 English Women's Snooker Championship, aged 12, she progressed from the group stage after defeating Jan Hughes and Maureen Rowland, then eliminated Marianne Williams in the quarter-finals, before losing 0–2 to Jamie Hunter in the semi-finals. The Snooker Scene magazine writer Annette Lord described this as "another impressive run" from Scott. At the 2023 Eden Masters she lost a close match in the semi-finals of the under-21 competition to Sophie Nix.

In 2024, Scott was one of eight players invited to join the English Partnership for Snooker and Billiards Junior Elite Performance Programme, which provides advice on sports psychology, nutrition, and how to obtain funding. She was selected for the England Women's team for the 2024 HIBSF Home International Championships alongside Hannah Jones, and Daisy May Oliver; the England team defeated the Scotland team, who were the only other entrants, by 33 frames to 3, with England players winning all of their matches.

She won her first title on the WWS tour, the under-21s event at the British Women's Open, in May 2024 after defeating Chloe Payne 2–0 in the semi-finals and Sophie Nix by the same score in the final.

Later that year, she eliminated Zoe Killington 2–1 in the semi-finals and then beat Payne 2–0 to win the UK Women's Championship under-21s tournament. This saw her rise to third place in the WWS under-21 rankings. In the first English Partnership for Snooker and Billiards Women's Tour event of the 2024–25 season she qualified from her group then defeated Payne 2–0 before losing the final 0–2 to Rebecca Kenna.

In March 2025 she became the top-ranked player on the World Women's Snooker Tour under-21 rankings. As of September 2025 she still held top place in that list. In October, at the women's EBSA European Snooker Championship, she defeated eventual champion Anna Prysazhnuka in the group stages and reached the semi-finals, where she lost to Kenna. Scott and Kenna won the women's team title, defeating Deu Va and Rachell Enfroy of France 3–2 in the final. Scott was overtaken at the top of the WWS under-21 rankings by Narucha Phoemphul in October 2025.

As of July 2025 she lived in Eastleigh with her mother Federica and her brother O'Shay. Her uncle Daniele Zagaroli was a professional snooker player.

== Titles and achievements ==
Individual finals contested by Ellise Scott
Outcome	No.	Organisation	Year	Championship	Opponent in the final	Score	Ref.
Winner	1.	WWS	2024	British Women's Open – Under-21s	Sophie Nix (SCO)	2–0	
Runner-up	1.	EPSB	2024	Women's Tour – Event 1	Rebecca Kenna (ENG)	0–2	
Winner	2.	WWS	2024	UK Women's Championship – Under-21s	Chloe Payne (ENG)	2–1	
Runner-up	2.	WWS	2025	Belgian Women's Open Challenge Cup (Note: for player that did not reach the later stages of the main competition)	Narucha Phoemphul (THA)	0–2	
Winner	3.	WWS	2025	British Women's Open – Under-21s	Chan Wai Lam (HKG)	2–0	
Runner-up	3.	EPSB	2025	English Women's Snooker Championship	Rebecca Kenna (ENG)	0–3	

Team finals contested by Ellise Scott
Outcome	No.	Organisation	Year	Championship	Team members	Opponent in the final	Score	Ref.
Winner	1	Home Internationals Billiards and Snooker Federation	2024	Home Internationals Women's Team	Hannah Jones (ENG); Daisy May Oliver (ENG)	Mhairi Mackay] (SCO); Tetyana Volovelska (SCO)	6–0 (Note: matches)	
Winner	2	European Billiards and Snooker Association	2025	EBSA Women's Team	Rebecca Kenna (ENG)	Deu Va (FRA); Rachell Enfroy (FRA)	3–2	
