= Sophie Nix =

Scottish snooker player

Personal information
- Born: 1 July 2008 (age 18)

Sport
- Country: Scotland
- Sport: Snooker

Sophie Nix (born 1 July 2008) is a Scottish snooker player. In February 2024 she became the top-ranked under-21 women's player.

== Career ==
Sophie Nix started playing pool on holiday when she was 9. After returning from holiday, she started playing pool at a local amusement arcade; where she was seen by coach Alan Duffy and invited to join his junior snooker academy. After playing twice a week for a couple of years, she started playing daily. From about 2022, she started being coached by Chris Small as well as by Duffy.

She played her first tournament on the World Women's Snooker Tour in 2021, when she was 13. She was a losing finalist at the 2021 Scottish Open Under-21 tournament, defeated 0-2 by Ploychompoo Laokiatphong, and was also runner-up at the 2023 British Open Under-21, 0-2 against Bai Yulu.

Her first under-21 title was the Eden Women's Masters in November 2023, where she eliminated Ellise Scott in a close match before prevailing 2-1 against Zoe Killington in the final. She was runner-up to Bai Yulu, 0-2, at the 2024 Albanian Women's Open Under-21 tournament. She won the 2024 Landywood British Women's Open Challenge Cup, a competition for players who did not reach the last rounds of the main event, by defeating Nikola Broyak 2-0 in the final.

In February 2024 she became the top-ranked under-21 women's player. She was nominated by the World Professional Billiards and Snooker Association to participate in the 2024 Snooker Shoot Out.

== Titles and achievements ==
World Women's Snooker finals contested by Sophie Nix
Outcome	No.	Year	Championship	Opponent	Score
Runner-up	1	2022	Scottish Women's Open (Under-21)	Ploychompoo Laokiatphong (THA)	0–2
Runner-up	2	2023	British Women's Open (Under-21)	Bai Yulu (CHN)	0–2
Winner	1	2023	Eden Women's Masters (Under-21)	Zoe Killington (ENG)	2–1
Runner-up	1	2024	Albanian Women's Open (Under-21)	Bai Yulu (CHN)	0–2
Runner-up	1	2024	Landywood British Women's Open (Under-21)	Ellise Scott (ENG)	0–2
Winner	1	2024	Landywood British Women's Open (Challenge Cup)	Nikola Broyak (POL)	2–0
Runner-up	1	2024	Women's Masters (Challenge Cup)	Narantuya Bayarsaikhan (MNG)	1–2
