= English Association of Snooker and Billiards =

- Sport: Snooker and English billiards
- Founded: 1993
- Country: England

The English Association of Snooker and Billiards (EASB), based in Surrey, England, was launched by the World Professional Billiards and Snooker Association (WPBSA) in 1993 with the aim of the EASB becoming the governing body for amateur snooker and English billiards. It was funded by the WPBSA until 2002, when as one of the measures that the WPBSA took to cut costs, it was given a final one-off payment of £50,000. The link with the professional association had meant that the EASB was not recognised by Sport England as an amateur body.

The English Partnership for Snooker and Billiards has been responsible for the governance of amateur snooker in England since June 2019, when a resolution was passed by the English Association of Snooker and Billiards to transfer its assets and operations to the EPSB.
