= Rules of snooker =

Overview article

Snooker table, drawn to scale, with starting positions of all object balls and the cue ball placed within the "D" for a break-off shot.

Snooker is a cue sport that is played on a baize-covered billiard table with pockets in each of the four corners and in the middle of each of the long side cushions. It is played using a cue and snooker balls: one white cue ball, 15 red balls worth one point each (the game is sometimes played with fewer red balls, commonly 6 or 10), and six balls of different colours: yellow (2 points), green (3), brown (4), blue (5), pink (6), black (7). A player (or team) wins a frame (individual game) of snooker by scoring more points than the opponent(s), using the cue ball to pot the red and coloured object balls. A player (or team) wins a match when they have achieved the best-of score from a pre-determined number of frames. The number of frames is always odd so as to prevent a tie or a draw.

== The table ==
Snooker is played on a rectangular snooker table with six pockets, one at each corner and one in the middle of each long side. The table usually has a slate base, covered in green baize. A baulk line is drawn across the width of the table, 29 inches (74 cm) from the cushion at one end. A semicircle of radius 11 1/2 inches (29 cm), called the "D", is drawn behind this line, with its centre on the midpoint. The cushion at the other end of the table is known as the top cushion.

A regulation (full-size) table is 12 ft × 6 ft (3.7 m × 1.8 m); because of the large size of these tables, smaller tables are common in homes.

== The balls ==
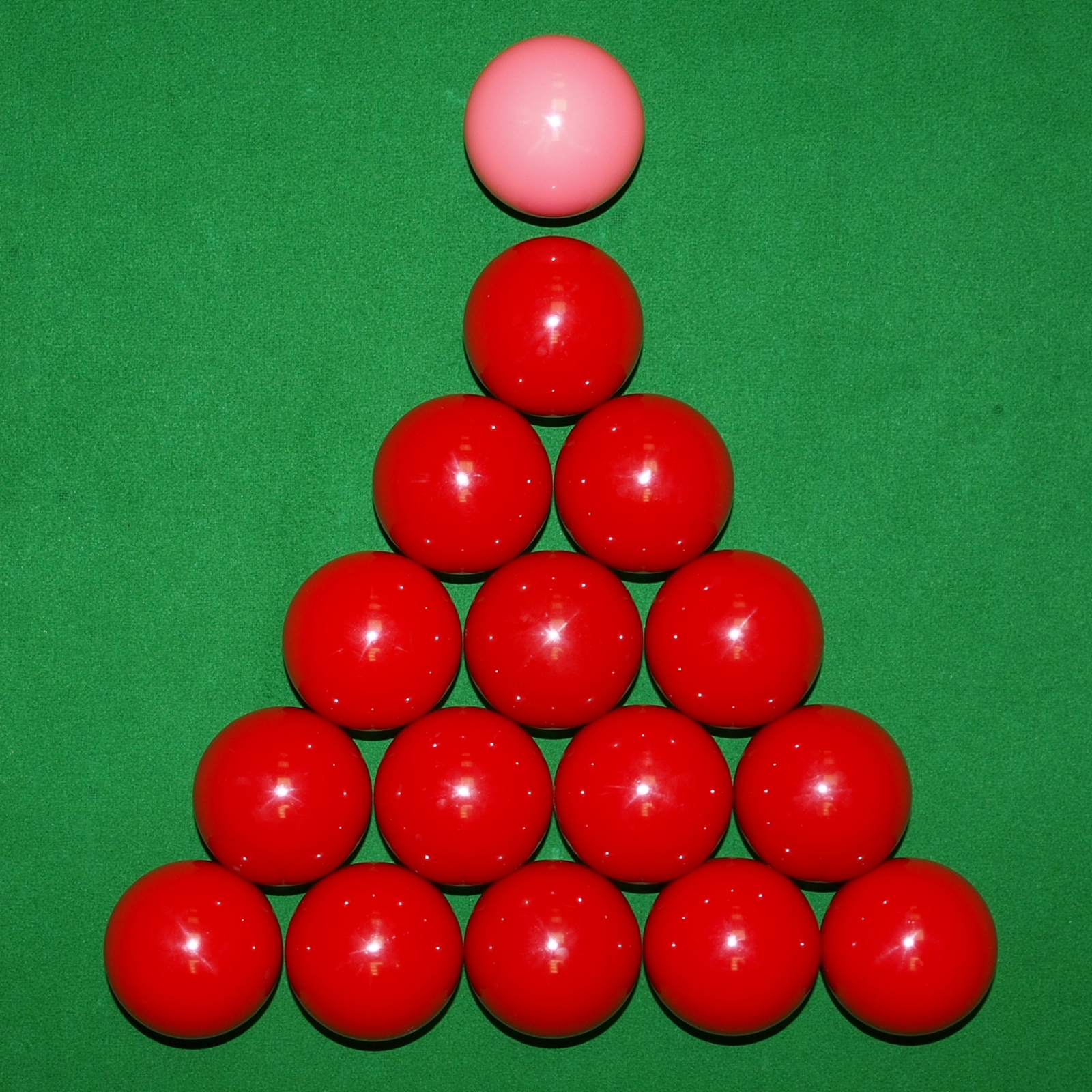
Pack of reds, not touching the pink

Snooker balls, like billiard balls, are typically made of phenolic resin, and are smaller than American pool balls. Regulation snooker balls (which are specified in metric units) are nominally 52.5 mm (approximately 2 1/15 inches) in diameter, though many sets are actually manufactured at 52.4 mm (about 2 1/16 in). No weight for the balls is specified in the rules, only that the weight of any two balls should not differ by more than 0.5 g. There are fifteen red balls, six "colour" balls (yellow, green, brown, blue, pink, and black), and one white cue ball.

At the beginning of a frame, the balls are set up in the arrangement shown in the illustration. The six colours (all balls except the white and the reds) are placed on their own spots. The red balls are arranged in a tightly-packed triangle behind the pink, with the apex as close as possible to the pink but not touching it.

== Objective ==
The objective of the game of snooker is to strike the white cue ball with a cue so that it strikes the object balls in turn and causes them to fall into one of the six pockets, called potting. Points are scored for potting balls legally, in accordance with the rules described below, or in the event of a foul committed by the opponent. The player who scores more points wins the frame, and the first player to win a set number of frames wins the match.

== Match ==
A match usually consists of a fixed, odd number of frames. A frame begins with setting up the balls as described above. A frame ends when all balls are potted, or when one of the players concedes defeat due to being too far behind on points to tie or beat the opponent's score.

A match ends when one player has won enough frames to make it impossible for the other player to catch up. For example, in a match of 19 frames, the first player to win 10 is the victor.

In most versions of snooker, there is no specified time limit for a player to take a shot. However, the referee may issue a warning at his/her discretion, then award the frame to the opponent if the player takes too long to act.

== Gameplay ==
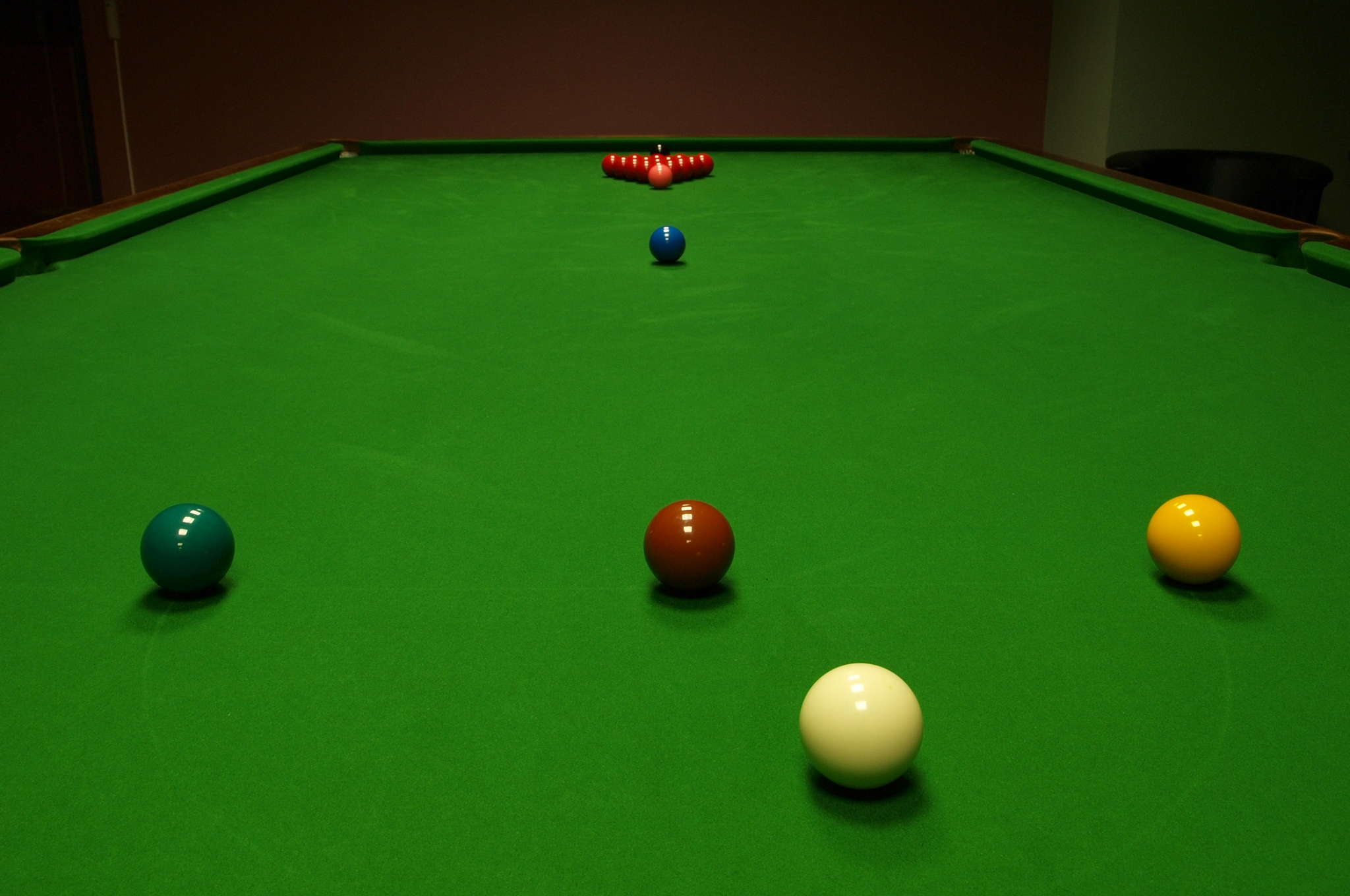
Snooker table with all balls at the beginning of a frame. The cue ball has been placed within the D for a break-off shot.

At the beginning of each frame, the balls are set up by the referee as explained. The frame begins with one player taking the cue ball "in-hand", placing it anywhere on or inside the D and attempting to hit one or more of the red balls on an initial break-off shot. A mechanical bridge or rest may be used by either player at any time during a frame.

Only one player may visit the table at a time. A break is the number of points scored in a single visit to the table. A player's turn and break end when they commit a foul, fail to pot a ball, or when a frame is complete.

The ball(s) that can be hit first by the cue ball are referred to as being "on" for that particular stroke. The ball(s) "on" differ from shot to shot; if any reds are on the table, all of them are "on" for the first stroke of a player's turn. Potting a red allows the player to nominate one colour as "on" for the next shot and attempt to pot it. This alternation between reds and colours continues until a player either ends their turn by missing or committing a foul, or pots the last red and attempts (successfully or not) to pot a colour after it.

Colour	Value
Red	1 point
Yellow	2 points
Green	3 points
Brown	4 points
Blue	5 points
Pink	6 points
Black	7 points

Each legally potted red ball awards one point and remains off the table until the end of the frame. The player continues their turn by nominating one of the six colours (yellow, green, brown, blue, pink, black) as the ball "on" for the next shot.

Potting the nominated colour awards further points (two through seven, in the same order as the preceding paragraph). The referee then removes the colour from the pocket and replaces it on the table in its original spot. If that spot is occupied (that is, if the ball cannot be placed on it without touching another ball), then the ball is placed on the highest available spot. If all spots are occupied, it is placed as close to its own spot as possible in a direct line between that spot and the top cushion, without touching another ball.

The alternation between red balls and colours ends when all reds have been potted and an attempt (successful or not) to pot a colour is made after the last red is potted, or when the last red is potted or knocked off the table due to a foul and is not replaced. The six colours have then to be potted in ascending order of their value (yellow, green, brown, blue, pink, black); each becomes the ball "on" in that order. During this phase, the colours are not replaced on the table after being legally potted, but any colour potted as the result of a foul is re-spotted.

After all six colours have been potted, the player with the higher score wins the frame (but see below for end-of-frame scenarios).

Because only one of the colours can be "on" at any given time, it is a foul to first hit multiple colours at the same time, or pot more than one colour (unless a free ball has been awarded.

=== Touching ball ===
If the cue ball comes to rest in direct contact with a ball that is on or could be on, the referee shall declare a "touching ball". The striker must "play away" from that ball without moving it, but is not required to hit any other ball because the touching ball is on. If the object ball moves, it is considered a push shot and a foul is called. No penalty is incurred for playing away if:

1. The ball is on. Example: Striker pots a colour, making the reds on for the next shot, and the cue ball comes to rest touching one of them.
2. The ball could be on and the striker nominates it as on. Example: Striker pots a red, cue ball comes to rest touching the green, and the striker declares that ball as on.
3. The ball could be on, and the striker nominates another ball as on and hits it first. Example: Striker pots a red, cue ball comes to rest touching the green, and the striker declares the black as on and hits it first.

If the cue ball is touching another ball which could not be on (e.g. touching a colour when the striker must pot a red, or vice versa), a touching ball is not called, and the striker must play away from it and hit a legally nominated object ball. Where the cue ball is simultaneously touching several balls that are on or could be on, the referee shall indicate that each and every one of them is a touching ball; the striker must therefore play away from all of them.

The striker scores no points for balls potted as the result of a foul. Depending on the situation, these balls will either remain off the table; be returned to their original spots; or be replaced in the positions they occupied before the foul shot, along with any other balls that were moved during the shot. For details on such situations, see Fouls below.

If any reds are still on the table and a player fails to legally pot a ball that is on, whether a red or a nominated colour, the opponent will come to the table and the reds will be on. If a player's turn ends with no reds on the table, and in such a way that none of them must be replaced due to a foul, the opponent's turn will begin with the lowest-value colour on the table as being on.

== Fouls ==
A foul (or fault) is a shot or action by the striker which is against the rules of the game. When a foul is made during a shot, the player's turn ends, and no points are awarded for any balls potted on that shot. Common fouls are:

- Failing to hit any other ball with the cue ball.
- First hitting a ball "not-on" with the cue ball.
- Potting a ball "not-on".
- Potting the cue ball (in-off).
- Touching any object ball with anything but the cue ball.
- Touching any ball before all balls have come to a complete stop.
- Hitting the cue ball more than once on the same shot.
- Making a ball land off the table.
- Touching the cue ball with anything other than the tip of the cue.
- Playing a push shot
- Playing a jump shot – a shot where the cue ball leaves the bed of the table and jumps over any part of a ball before first hitting another ball.
- Playing a shot with both feet off the ground. The player may lean over the table and/or support a portion of their weight on it, but at least one foot must remain in contact with the ground.

When a player commits a foul and the cue ball remains on the table, the opponent may either play from the resulting position or request the offender play again. If the cue ball is potted or leaves the table, the opponent receives it "in-hand" and may then place it anywhere on or within the "D" for the next shot.

Potting two or more balls in one shot is not an automatic foul, as when the reds are "on", two or more of them may be legally potted in the same shot and are worth one point each. In the following shot, the player may only nominate and attempt to pot one colour.

Should a cue ball be touched with the tip while "in-hand", i.e. when breaking-off or playing from the "D" after being potted or knocked off the table, a foul is not committed as long as the referee is satisfied that the player was only positioning the ball, and not playing a shot or preparing to play one.

The following fouls award seven points to the opponent when committed:

- Playing at reds, or a free ball followed by a red, in successive strokes
- Failing to declare which ball is "on" when requested to do so by the referee
- After potting a red or free ball nominated as a red, committing a foul before nominating a colour
- Using a ball off the table for any purpose
- Using any object to measure gaps or distance

Any other foul awards points to the opponent equal to the value of the ball "on", the highest value of all balls involved in the foul, or four points, whichever is highest. If multiple fouls are committed in one shot, only the penalty for the highest-valued foul is scored. The penalty for a foul is thus no lower than four points and no higher than seven.

A common defensive tactic is to play a shot that leaves the opponent unable to hit a ball "on" directly. This is most commonly called "snookering" one's opponent, or alternatively "laying a snooker" or putting the other player "in a snooker".

Because players receive points for fouls by their opponents, repeatedly snookering one's opponent is a possible way of winning a frame when potting all the balls on the table would be insufficient to ensure a win or tie. This portion of the frame is known as the "snookers-required" stage.

=== Free ball ===
A free ball allows a player to nominate an alternative ball for the ball "on" when a player becomes snookered as the result of a foul committed by the opponent. The snooker is considered illegitimate in this case, and the affected player is allowed to nullify it by nominating any object ball as being "on" for the first shot of their turn. Once the free ball shot is taken legally, the game continues normally; however, if the player who committed the foul is asked to play again, a free ball is not granted. If the free ball is potted by itself, it is respotted and the player scores the points for the actual ball "on".

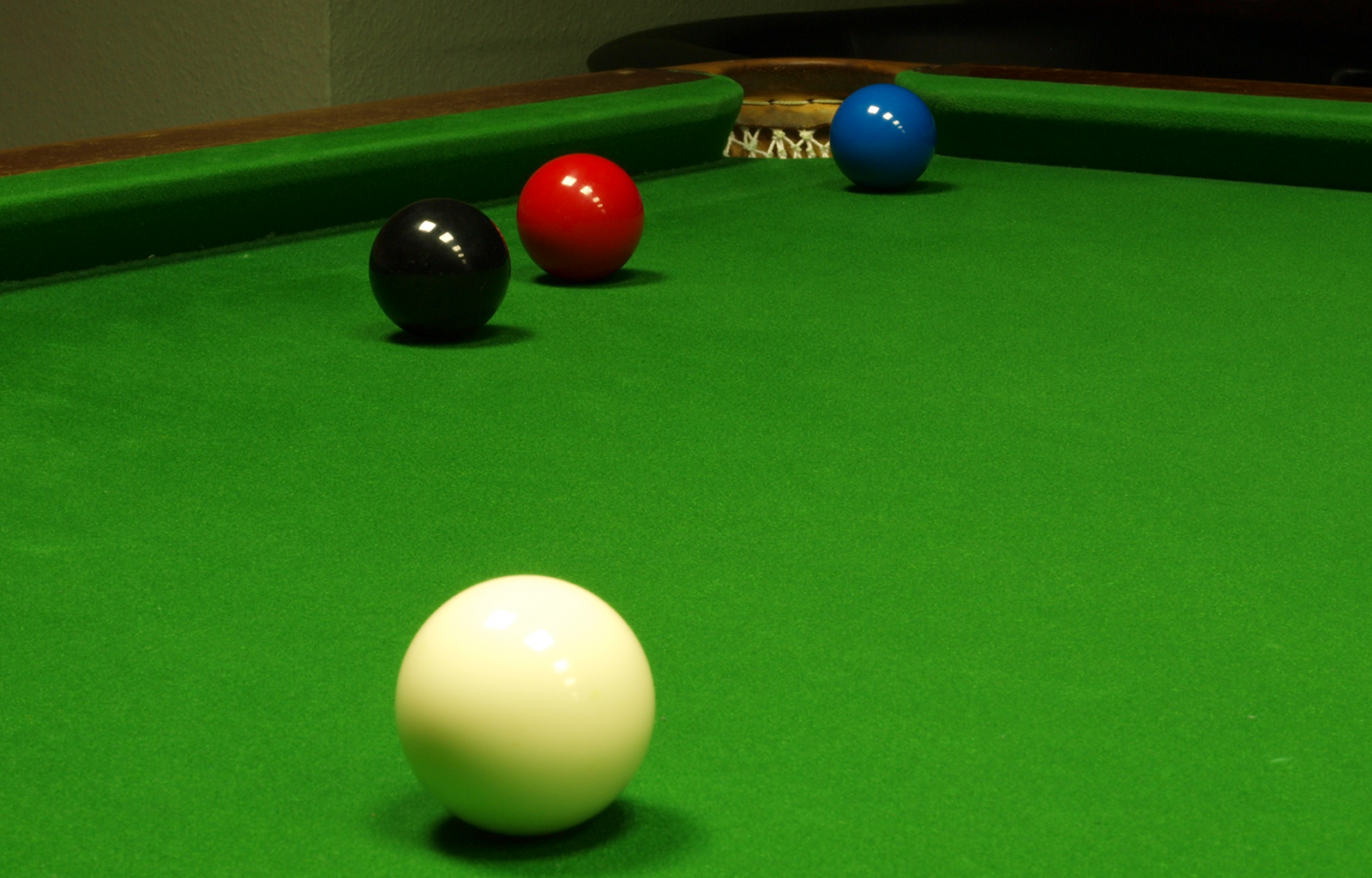
Free ball situation, with the red on but snookered by the black.

For example, if the ball "on" is the red, but is snookered by the black due to a foul, the fouled player will be able to name any colour as the free ball. The player could then pot the chosen colour as if it were a red for one point. The colour will then be respotted, the player will nominate a colour to be on for the next shot, and normal play will resume.

As a natural corollary of the rules, the free ball is always a colour ball. If the reds are "on", they can only be snookered by colours; after all the reds are potted, the lowest-value colour still on the table is "on" and can only be snookered by another colour.

The scoring for a shot in which both the free ball and the actual ball on are potted depends on the point in the game at which it occurs. If the reds are on and both the free ball and one or more reds are potted, then each ball potted is scored as a red for one point. If a colour is on and both it and the free ball are potted, only the actual ball on is scored. In both cases, the free ball will be re-spotted and the actual ball(s) on will remain off the table. These two situations represent the only times when a colour can be potted in the same shot as a red or another colour without a foul occurring.

The player may hit the free ball into the actual ball on in order to pot the latter, referred to as planting. Going back to the picture above, the player could nominate the black as the free ball and use it to plant the real red for one point. If the player potted both balls in one shot, two points would be awarded and the black would be re-spotted. A foul is committed if the player fails to strike the free ball either first by itself, or simultaneously with the actual ball on.

Failing to pot the free ball incurs no penalty, so the striker may play a snooker using the free ball if desired. However, if said snooker is achieved by having the free ball come to rest obstructing the ball on, then the strike is a foul and a penalty of the value of the ball on is awarded to the opponent. The reason is that the free ball was to be treated as the ball on, and a ball on cannot be snookered by another one (following the same logic that reds cannot snooker one another when they are on). The only exception to this rule is when there are only two balls remaining on the table, namely pink and black. If the opposition fouls while trying to pot the pink and leaves the striker snookered by the black, then the striker may use the black as a free ball and legally attempt to snooker the opposition with it.

When judging a free ball, the cushions are not considered an obstruction and the situation is judged as if they were not there, i.e. as if the table was a flat surface with no limits or edges. When the cue ball gets stuck at the edge of a pocket jaw (commonly referred to as "angled") in such a manner that the player is unable to hit any ball on, a free ball is only awarded if all the balls on would be at least partially obstructed by a ball not on, if the cushions were not in the way. If a free ball is not awarded, after a foul, the player may choose to either take the shot from the current position or ask the offender to play again, as per the usual rules on fouls.

A ball on is considered to be unobstructed only if every portion of it can be directly hit by the cue ball without first making contact with another ball. If multiple reds remain on the table, each one is evaluated as if the others were not there, as one red cannot be snookered by another; if at least one red is judged to be unobstructed, a free ball is not granted.

== Foul and a miss ==
Players shall, to the best of their ability (based on the tournament they are competing in), endeavour to hit the ball "on". A foul and a miss will be called if a player does not hit the ball "on" first (a foul) and is deemed by the referee to have not made the best possible attempt (a miss). In this case, the opponent has the option to request that all balls be returned to their position on the table before the foul and require the fouling player to take the shot again.

The rule was introduced to prevent players from playing professional fouls (i.e., a push out shot or deliberately fouling so as to leave the balls in a safe position, reducing the risk of giving a frame-winning chance to the opponent). Nowadays, multiple misses often occur because players attempt to hit a shot very softly or thinly in situations where a fuller contact might leave their opponent an easy potting chance, this can lead to an easy escape not being attempted as players feel that it is better to give points away but leave a safe position rather than give no points away and leave a frame-winning chance.

In practice, the "best attempt" determination consists of three key elements:

- Whether the player's choice of shot is the easiest to be achieved. If a player attempts a more difficult escape shot with an easier escape available, intention to leave the opponent in a bad position after a foul is presumed and thus a miss will be called.
- Whether the cue ball has been hit with sufficient strength to reach the ball "on". Undershooting almost always results in a miss, as intention to leave the opponent in a bad position after a foul is again presumed in this case.
- Whether the player has tried to get the cue ball as close to the ball "on" as possible.

All three of these elements must be present in order for the referee to decide that a player has made their "best attempt".

There are two situations in which a miss will not be called, taking into consideration whether the referee decides that a best attempt has or has not been made due to the player knowing they shall intend to: choose the easiest shot; hit with sufficient strength; get as close as possible:

1. If either player needs penalty points to win a frame, or if either player would need them after the current penalty is applied, and the referee believes that the foul was not intentional. This is to protect the players from running up the score by repeatedly missing in worst-case scenarios.
2. If it is physically impossible to play a legal shot (the snooker is truly inescapable, as judged by the referee). The player must still put sufficient strength into the shot so that the cue ball would be able to reach its target if it were not obstructed, and attempt a shot that could succeed if the obstruction were not present.

If a player fouls and misses in a non-snookered scenario, or such that central full ball - not full face which includes the extreme edges - contact is available in a clear straight path to a ball "on", and if the opponent requests that the shot be replayed from the original position, a second failure is ruled a foul and a miss regardless of the score difference. The fouling player is issued a warning by the referee, and a third such failure forfeits the frame to the opponent. A foul after such a warning is very rare.

== The end of a frame ==
A frame normally ends in one of three ways.

- A concession, in which one player gives up due to being too far behind to have a realistic chance of winning the frame. Conceding before snookers are required is regarded as unsporting conduct.
- The final black is potted legally (including after a re-spot), and this does not leave the score tied.
- The striker leads by more than seven points with only the black remaining. They may claim the win at this point, but may also try to pot the black despite having won the frame. This may be done if the striker wishes to complete a high-scoring break (see "Maximum break" below).

There are three less common ways to end a frame:

- A foul on the black, when the black is the only ball left. The player who is in the lead following a penalty after a foul, when only the black remains, becomes the winner.
- Failure to hit a ball "on" three times in a row, if the player has a clear sight of the ball. The referee will warn a player after a second such miss that a third miss will mean that the opponent will be awarded the frame. This rule does not apply if the player is snookered.
- A player may incur a verbal warning if the referee deems that they are taking too long to play a shot. Additional hesitation may forfeit the frame to the opponent at the referee's discretion.

If the score is tied after the final black is fouled or potted, the black is re-spotted. The winner of a coin toss by the referee decides which player will take first strike at the black; that player receives the cue ball "in-hand" for their first shot. Play then continues normally until the black is potted or another frame-ending situation occurs.

If the players reach a prolonged stalemate situation, as declared by the referee (who may be requested to by agreement from the players) they shall discard the scores from the current frame and restart it. In situations where the referee determines that the game is not a stalemate, despite agreement from both players the frame is not restarted.

== Maximum break ==
The highest break that can be made under normal circumstances is 147. To achieve it, the player must pot all 15 reds, with the black after every red, followed by potting all six colours.

This "maximum break" of 147 rarely occurs in match play. The fastest maximum break in a tournament was achieved during the World Championships on 21 April 1997, by Ronnie O'Sullivan against Mick Price in five minutes and eight seconds.

If an opponent fouls before any balls are potted, and leaves the player a free ball, the player can then nominate a colour and play it as a red for one point, then nominate a colour and pot it for its normal value. It is thus possible to score for 16 reds and blacks (16 * 8), plus the values of all the colours (27), resulting in a break of 155. Under tournament conditions, Jamie Burnett achieved 148 points in 2004, a record that stood until Ronnie O'Sullivan achieved 153 points in 2026.
