= English Partnership for Snooker and Billiards =

Governing body for amateur Snooker and English Billiards in England

- Sport: Snooker and English billiards (amateur)
- Jurisdiction: England
- Abbreviation: EPSB
- Founded: 2015
- Headquarters: Bristol
- Replaced: English Association of Snooker and Billiards

Official website
- www.epsb.co.uk

The English Partnership for Snooker and Billiards (EPSB), established in the Summer of 2015, describes itself as "an umbrella organisation that aligns the interests of the affiliated bodies and creates projects to inspire and drive awareness of snooker and billiards."

It has been responsible for the governance of amateur snooker in England since June 2019, when a resolution was passed by the English Association of Snooker and Billiards (EASB) to transfer its assets and operations to the EPSB. It organises tournaments including the English Amateur Championship.

The EPSB has four affiliated bodies:

- World Professional Billiards and Snooker Association
- World Billiards
- World Disability Billiards and Snooker
- World Women's Snooker

The English Association of Snooker and Billiards was previously an affiliated organisation.
