= 2024 Xi'an Grand Prix =

Snooker tournament

2024 Du Xiaoman Xi'an Grand Prix

Tournament information
- Dates: 19–25 August 2024
- Venue: Qujiang E-sports Centre
- City: Xi'an
- Country: China
- Organisation: World Snooker Tour
- Format: Ranking event
- Total prize fund: £850,000
- Winner's share: £177,000
- Highest break: Mark Williams (WAL) (140)

Final
- Champion: Kyren Wilson (ENG)
- Runner-up: Judd Trump (ENG)
- Score: 10–8

The 2024 Xi'an Grand Prix (officially the 2024 Du Xiaoman Xi'an Grand Prix) was a professional snooker tournament that took place from 19 to 25 August 2024 at the Qujiang E‑sports Centre in Xi'an, China. It was the inaugural edition of the tournament. The second ranking event of the 2024‍–‍25 season, it followed the 2024 Championship League. The winner received £177,000 from a total prize fund of £850,000.

Qualifiers took place from 25 to 27 July 2024 at the Leicester Arena in Leicester, England. Qualifying matches featuring the reigning World Champion (Kyren Wilson); the world's top ranked player (Mark Allen); the two highest ranked Chinese players (Ding Junhui and Zhang Anda); four Chinese wildcards (Zhou Jinhao, Cao Jin, Wang Xinbo and Ma Shaojun); and Ronnie O'Sullivan were held over to be played in Xi'an.

Kyren Wilson won the tournament, beating Judd Trump 10‍–‍8 in the final to claim the seventh ranking title of his career. The tournament produced 93 century breaks, of which 66 were made in the main stage and 27 in qualifying. The highest break was a 140 by Mark Williams in qualifying.

== Format ==
The tournament, the inaugural edition of the Xi'an Grand Prix, took place from 19 to 25 August 2024 at the Qujiang E‑sports Centre in Xi'an, China. It was the second ranking event of the 2024‍–‍25 season, following the 2024 Championship League. The tournament was organised by the World Snooker Tour and sponsored by Du Xiaoman.

All matches up to and including the quarter‑finals were the best of nine frames. The semi‑finals were the best of 11 frames, and the final was the best of 19 frames.

The qualifying matches were broadcast by the WST Facebook page, and by Matchroom Sport. The main stage of the tournament was broadcast by CCTV5 and Huya in China, Sportcast in Taiwan, Now TV in Hong Kong, and Matchroom Sport for all other territories.

=== Prize fund ===
The breakdown of prize money for this event is shown below:

- Winner: £177,000
- Runner-up: £76,000
- Semi-final: £34,500
- Quarter-final: £22,350
- Last 16: £14,000
- Last 32: £9,400
- Last 64: £5,350
- Highest break: £5,000
- Total: £850,000

== Summary ==
An opening ceremony was held on 18 August 2024.

=== Qualifying round ===
Both Lim Kok Leong and the 2023 World Champion Luca Brecel failed to arrive at the venue in time for their qualifying matches, and so their opponents, Scott Donaldson and Hammad Miah respectively, were awarded walkovers.

=== Early rounds ===
==== Held-over qualifying matches ====
The held over qualifying matches were played on 19 August 2024. Jamie Clarke whitewashed wildcard player Cao Jin, and Ronnie O'Sullivan whitewashed Wang Yuchen. Alfie Burden beat the 8th seed Ding Junhui 5‍–‍4. Mark Allen defeated Liu Hongyu 5‍–‍2.

==== Last 64 ====
The last 64 matches were played on 19 and 20 August 2024. Scott Donaldson withdrew and so Barry Hawkins was awarded a walkover into the last 32. Gong Chenzhi beat 13th seed Tom Ford 5‍–‍1. Sunny Akani defeated 16th seed John Higgins 5‍–‍4. Top seed Kyren Wilson beat He Guoqiang 5‍–‍2, and Shaun Murphy whitewashed Jamie Clarke in 55 minutes with three century breaks. O'Sullivan defeated Bulcsú Révész 5‍–‍2, and Mark Selby whitewashed Aaron Hill. Yuan Sijun beat Neil Robertson 5‍–‍2, and Graeme Dott defeated 12th seed Zhang Anda 5‍–‍2.

==== Last 32 ====
The last 32 matches were played on 21 August 2024. Graeme Dott withdrew and so Hossein Vafaei was awarded a walkover into the last 16. Mark Allen beat Xiao Guodong 5‍–‍2, and Gong Chenzhi defeated Si Jiahui 5‍–‍3. Ronnie O'Sullivan beat Yuan Sijun 5‍–‍1, and Dominic Dale defeated Shaun Murphy 5‍–‍2.

==== Last 16 ====
The last 16 matches were played on 22 August 2024. In the afternoon session, Judd Trump beat Jak Jones 5‍–‍1, although Jones made the only century break (136) of the match, and Xu Si defeated Mark Williams 5‍–‍4, making a 109 break in the deciding frame. Barry Hawkins beat Mark Allen 5‍–‍3, although Allen made the only century break (104) of the match. Matthew Selt defeated Gong Chenzhi 5‍–‍4. In the evening session, Ronnie O'Sullivan whitewashed Hossein Vafaei making two century breaks, and Daniel Wells beat Dominic Dale 5‍–‍1. Kyren Wilson defeated Jimmy Robertson 5‍–‍4 and David Gilbert beat Mark Selby 5‍–‍4, although Selby made the only century break (116) of the match.

=== Later rounds ===
==== Quarter-finals ====
The quarter finals were played on 23 August 2024. In the afternoon session Kyren Wilson beat Xu Si 5‍–‍1, making a break of 115 in the last frame, and Ronnie O'Sullivan defeated Matthew Selt 5‍–‍4, although Selt made two century breaks. In the evening session, Judd Trump beat David Gilbert 5‍–‍2, and Daniel Wells beat Barry Hawkins 5‍–‍3.

==== Semi-finals ====
The semi finals were played on 24 August 2024 as the best of 11 frames. In the afternoon session Kyren Wilson defeated Ronnie O'Sullivan 6‍–‍4, making a break of 102 in the last frame. In the evening session Judd Trump beat Daniel Wells 6‍–‍1. This win meant that Trump had overtaken Mark Allen as world number one.

==== Final ====
The final was played on 25 August 2024 as the best of 19 frames over two sessions. Kyren Wilson played Judd Trump. At the end of the afternoon session, Wilson led Trump 5‍–‍4. Wilson went on to win the match 10‍–‍8.

== Main draw ==
The draw for the tournament is shown below. Numbers in parentheses after the players' names denote the top 32 seeded players, and players in bold denote match winners.

=== Top half ===
**Last 64**; Best of 9 frames
**Kyren Wilson (ENG) (1)**	**5**
He Guoqiang (CHN)	2
Anthony McGill (SCO) (32)	3
**Ricky Walden (ENG)**	**5**
John Higgins (SCO) (16)	4
**Sunny Akani (THA)**	**5**
Dean Young (SCO)	4
**Jimmy Robertson (ENG)**	**5**
Elliot Slessor (ENG)	2
**Chris Wakelin (ENG) (24)**	**5**
Mark Davis (ENG)	2
**Mark Williams (WAL) (9)**	**5**
Jamie Jones (WAL)	3
**Stuart Bingham (ENG) (25)**	**5**
**Xu Si (CHN)**	**5**
Alfie Burden (ENG)	4
**Ronnie O'Sullivan (ENG) (5)**	**5**
Bulcsú Révész (HUN)	2
Neil Robertson (AUS) (28)	2
**Yuan Sijun (CHN)**	**5**
Zhang Anda (CHN) (12)	2
**Graeme Dott (SCO)**	**5**
**Hossein Vafaei (IRN) (21)**	**5**
Dylan Emery (WAL)	3
Amir Sarkhosh (IRN)	3
**Si Jiahui (CHN) (20)**	**5**
**Gong Chenzhi (CHN)**	**5**
Tom Ford (ENG) (13)	1
**Matthew Selt (ENG)**	**5**
Joe O'Connor (ENG) (29)	4
Zak Surety (ENG)	3
**Hammad Miah (ENG) (Note: Luca Brecel did not show up for the qualifying match and so Hammad Miah was given a walkover.)**	**5**

**Last 32**; Best of 9 frames
**(England) Kyren Wilson (1)**	**5**
(England) Ricky Walden	3
(Thailand) Sunny Akani	3
**(England) Jimmy Robertson**	**5**
(England) Chris Wakelin (24)	2
**(Wales) Mark Williams (9)**	**5**
(England) Stuart Bingham (25)	4
**(China) Xu Si**	**5**
**(England) Ronnie O'Sullivan (5)**	**5**
(China) Yuan Sijun	1
(Scotland) Graeme Dott	w/d
**(Iran) Hossein Vafaei (21)**	**w/o**
(China) Si Jiahui (20)	3
**(China) Gong Chenzhi**	**5**
**(England) Matthew Selt**	**5**
(England) Hammad Miah	2

**Last 16**; Best of 9 frames
**(England) Kyren Wilson (1)**	**5**
(England) Jimmy Robertson	4
(Wales) Mark Williams (9)	4
**(China) Xu Si**	**5**
**(England) Ronnie O'Sullivan (5)**	**5**
(Iran) Hossein Vafaei (21)	0
(China) Gong Chenzhi	4
**(England) Matthew Selt**	**5**

**Quarter-finals**; Best of 9 frames
**(England) Kyren Wilson (1)**	**5**
(China) Xu Si	1
**(England) Ronnie O'Sullivan (5)**	**5**
(England) Matthew Selt	4

**Semi-finals**; Best of 11 frames
**(England) Kyren Wilson (1)**	**6**
(England) Ronnie O'Sullivan (5)	4

Note: w/d=withdrawn; w/o=walkover

=== Bottom half ===
**Last 64**; Best of 9 frames
**Judd Trump (ENG) (3)**	**5**
Ma Hailong (CHN)	0
**Lyu Haotian (CHN) (30)**	**5**
Artemijs Žižins (LVA)	2
**Jak Jones (WAL) (14)**	**5**
Tian Pengfei (CHN)	3
**Jack Lisowski (ENG) (19)**	**5**
Joe Perry (ENG)	2
Jordan Brown (NIR)	2
**David Gilbert (ENG) (22)**	**5**
Ben Mertens (BEL)	1
**Gary Wilson (ENG) (11)**	**5**
Paul Deaville (ENG) (Note: Paul Deaville replaced Stuart Carrington who withdrew.)	0
**Pang Junxu (CHN) (27)**	**5**
Aaron Hill (IRL)	0
**Mark Selby (ENG) (6)**	**5**
**Shaun Murphy (ENG) (7)**	**5**
Jamie Clarke (WAL)	0
Noppon Saengkham (THA) (26)	3
**Dominic Dale (WAL)**	**5**
**Daniel Wells (WAL)**	**5**
Julien Leclercq (BEL)	3
Zhou Yuelong (CHN) (23)	2
**Thepchaiya Un-Nooh (THA)**	**5**
Matthew Stevens (WAL)	2
**Ryan Day (WAL) (18)**	**5**
Scott Donaldson (SCO)	w/d
**Barry Hawkins (ENG) (15)**	**w/o**
**Xiao Guodong (CHN)**	**5**
Stephen Maguire (SCO) (31)	1
David Lilley (ENG)	1
**Mark Allen (NIR) (2)**	**5**

**Last 32**; Best of 9 frames
**(England) Judd Trump (3)**	**5**
(China) Lyu Haotian (30)	1
**(Wales) Jak Jones (14)**	**5**
(England) Jack Lisowski (19)	4
**(England) David Gilbert (22)**	**5**
(England) Gary Wilson (11)	3
(China) Pang Junxu (27)	4
**(England) Mark Selby (6)**	**5**
(England) Shaun Murphy (7)	2
**(Wales) Dominic Dale**	**5**
**(Wales) Daniel Wells**	**5**
(Thailand) Thepchaiya Un-Nooh	4
(Wales) Ryan Day (18)	3
**(England) Barry Hawkins (15)**	**5**
(China) Xiao Guodong	2
**(Northern Ireland) Mark Allen (2)**	**5**

**Last 16**; Best of 9 frames
**(England) Judd Trump (3)**	**5**
(Wales) Jak Jones (14)	1
**(England) David Gilbert (22)**	**5**
(England) Mark Selby (6)	4
(Wales) Dominic Dale	1
**(Wales) Daniel Wells**	**5**
**(England) Barry Hawkins (15)**	**5**
(Northern Ireland) Mark Allen (2)	3

**Quarter-finals**; Best of 9 frames
**(England) Judd Trump (3)**	**5**
(England) David Gilbert (22)	2
**(Wales) Daniel Wells**	**5**
(England) Barry Hawkins (15)	3

**Semi-finals**; Best of 11 frames
**(England) Judd Trump (3)**	**6**
(Wales) Daniel Wells	1

Note: w/d=withdrawn; w/o=walkover

=== Final ===
Final: Best of 19 frames. Referee: Zhang Tao; Qujiang E-sports Centre, Xi'an, China, 25 August 2024
**Kyren Wilson** (1); England	**10**–8	Judd Trump (3); England
Afternoon: **78**–45, 0–**114** (114), 25–**75**, **77**–23, 25–**62**, **135**–0 (135), **75**–0, 5–**76**, **52**–39; Evening: 24–**63**, **78**–44, 7–**81**, 37–**73**, **76**–47, 12–**104** (104), **74**–1, **70**–45, **111**–0
(frame 6) **135**	Highest break	114 (frame 2)
1	Century breaks	**2**

== Qualifying ==
Qualification for the tournament took place from 25 to 27 July 2024 at the Leicester Arena in Leicester. Numbers in parentheses after the players' names denote the top 32 seeded players, and players in bold denote match winners.

Note: n/s=no-show (did not arrive in time for the match); w/d=withdrawn; w/o=walkover

=== Xi'an ===
Qualifying matches featuring the reigning World Champion (Kyren Wilson); the world's top ranked player (Mark Allen); the two highest ranked Chinese players (Ding Junhui and Zhang Anda); four Chinese wildcards (Zhou Jinhao, Cao Jin, Wang Xinbo, and Ma Shaojun); and Ronnie O'Sullivan were held over to be played in Xi'an. Results as follows:

- **Jamie Clarke** (WAL) **5**–0 Cao Jin (CHN)
- **Kyren Wilson** (ENG) (1) **5**–2 Haris Tahir (PAK)
- **Mark Selby** (ENG) (6) **5**–3 Wang Xinbo (CHN)
- **Zhang Anda** (CHN) (12) **5**–1 Oliver Lines (ENG)
- **Graeme Dott** (SCO) **5**–2 Ma Shaojun (CHN)
- **Stuart Bingham** (ENG) (25) **5**–1 Zhou Jinhao (CHN)
- **Ronnie O'Sullivan** (ENG) (5) **5**–0 Wang Yuchen (HKG)
- **Mark Allen** (NIR) (2) **5**–2 Liu Hongyu (CHN)
- Ding Junhui (CHN) (8) 4–**5** **Alfie Burden** (ENG)

=== Leicester ===
The results of the qualifying matches played in Leicester were as follows:

==== 25 July ====
- Martin O'Donnell (ENG) 3–**5** **Ma Hailong** (CHN)
- **Jamie Jones** (WAL) **5**–2 Mostafa Dorgham (EGY)
- **Scott Donaldson** (SCO) **w/o**–n/s Lim Kok Leong (MAS) (Note: Lim Kok Leong did not show up for the qualifying match and so Scott Donaldson was given a walkover.)
- **Xiao Guodong** (CHN) **5**–2 Iulian Boiko (UKR) (Note: Iulian Boiko replaced Martin Gould who withdrew.)
- **He Guoqiang** (CHN) **5**–4 Ashley Carty (ENG)
- **Thepchaiya Un-Nooh** (THA) **5**–3 Lei Peifan (CHN)
- Fan Zhengyi (CHN) 2–**5** **Sunny Akani** (THA)
- **Amir Sarkhosh** (IRN) **5**–3 Joshua Thomond (ENG) (Note: Joshua Thomond replaced Sam Craigie who withdrew.)
- Simon Blackwell (ENG) 4–**5** **Ben Mertens** (BEL)
- **Ryan Day** (WAL) (18) **5**–4 Cheung Ka Wai (HKG)
- David Grace (ENG) 0–**5** **Bulcsú Révész** (HUN)
- **Jordan Brown** (NIR) **5**–2 Liam Pullen (ENG)
- Robbie Williams (ENG) 3–**5** **Artemijs Žižins** (LVA)
- **John Higgins** (SCO) (16) **5**–2 Alexander Ursenbacher (SUI)
- **Hossein Vafaei** (IRN) (21) **5**–1 Ahmed Aly Elsayed (USA)
- Jackson Page (WAL) 2–**5** **Dylan Emery** (WAL)
- **Jack Lisowski** (ENG) (19) **5**–1 Ross Muir (SCO)
- **Neil Robertson** (AUS) (28) **5**–2 Allan Taylor (ENG)
- **David Gilbert** (ENG) (22) **5**–1 Reanne Evans (ENG)
- **Matthew Stevens** (WAL) **5**–0 Andrew Higginson (ENG)
- **Dominic Dale** (WAL) **5**–4 Mohammed Shehab (UAE)

==== 26 July ====
- **Chris Wakelin** (ENG) (24) **5**–4 Rory Thor (MAS)
- **Joe Perry** (ENG) **5**–0 Mink Nutcharut (THA)
- **Yuan Sijun** (CHN) **5**–1 Bai Yulu (CHN)
- **Tian Pengfei** (CHN) **5**–0 Farakh Ajaib (PAK)
- **Elliot Slessor** (ENG) **5**–0 Manasawin Phetmalaikul (THA)
- **Xu Si** (CHN) **5**–4 Jiang Jun (CHN)
- Anthony Hamilton (ENG) 4–**5** **Gong Chenzhi** (CHN)
- Wu Yize (CHN) 3–**5** **Paul Deaville** (ENG)
- **Joe O'Connor** (ENG) (29) **5**–3 Duane Jones (WAL)
- Sanderson Lam (ENG) 2–**5** **Zak Surety** (ENG)
- **Jak Jones** (WAL) (14) **5**–4 Robbie McGuigan (NIR)
- **Tom Ford** (ENG) (13) **5**–3 Stan Moody (ENG)
- **Pang Junxu** (CHN) (27) **5**–2 Michael Holt (ENG)
- Luca Brecel (BEL) (4) n/s–**w/o** **Hammad Miah** (ENG)
- **David Lilley** (ENG) **5**–3 Louis Heathcote (ENG)
- **Ricky Walden** (ENG) **5**–3 Liam Davies (WAL)
- **Matthew Selt** (ENG) **5**–2 Ian Burns (ENG)
- **Barry Hawkins** (ENG) (15) **5**–1 Kreishh Gurbaxani (IND)
- Ali Carter (ENG) (10) 4–**5** **Daniel Wells** (WAL)
- **Mark Williams** (WAL) (9) **5**–0 Liam Graham (SCO)

==== 27 July ====
- **Anthony McGill** (SCO) (32) **5**–0 Xing Zihao (CHN)
- **Noppon Saengkham** (THA) (26) **5**–3 Andrew Pagett (WAL)
- **Mark Davis** (ENG) **5**–3 Ishpreet Singh Chadha (IND)
- **Jimmy Robertson** (ENG) **5**–1 Huang Jiahao (CHN)
- **Zhou Yuelong** (CHN) (23) **5**–1 Haydon Pinhey (ENG)
- **Lyu Haotian** (CHN) (30) **5**–2 Baipat Siripaporn (THA)
- Ben Woollaston (ENG) 4–**5** **Julien Leclercq** (BEL)
- **Stephen Maguire** (SCO) (31) **5**–1 Ken Doherty (IRL)
- **Gary Wilson** (ENG) (11) **5**–4 Long Zehuang (CHN)
- **Judd Trump** (ENG) (3) **5**–2 Antoni Kowalski (POL)
- **Aaron Hill** (IRL) **5**–2 Chris Totten (SCO)
- Robert Milkins (ENG) (17) 3–**5** **Dean Young** (SCO)
- **Si Jiahui** (CHN) (20) **5**–4 Jimmy White (ENG)
- **Shaun Murphy** (ENG) (7) **5**–1 Mitchell Mann (ENG)

== Century breaks ==
=== Main stage centuries ===
A total of 66 century breaks were made during the main stage of the tournament in Xi'an.

- 138, 108 – Thepchaiya Un-Nooh
- 137 – Ricky Walden
- 136, 134 – Jak Jones
- 136, 116, 115, 113, 111 – Mark Selby
- 135, 115, 108, 103, 102, 100 – Kyren Wilson
- 135 – Amir Sarkhosh
- 134 – Sunny Akani
- 134 – Julien Leclercq
- 133, 131, 112, 111, 104 – Mark Allen
- 128, 103, 103, 100, 100 – Shaun Murphy
- 128 – Gary Wilson
- 126, 124, 111 – Jack Lisowski
- 120, 109, 104 – Xu Si
- 118, 118, 117 – Jimmy Robertson
- 114, 104 – Judd Trump
- 111, 110 – Stuart Bingham
- 111, 103 – Lyu Haotian
- 111 – Anthony McGill
- 110 – Ding Junhui
- 109, 104, 103 – Ronnie O'Sullivan
- 108 – Jamie Clarke
- 107 – Chris Wakelin
- 105, 102 – Matthew Selt
- 104, 102 – Barry Hawkins
- 104 – Hammad Miah
- 103 – Ryan Day
- 103 – Hossein Vafaei
- 102, 101, 100 – Mark Williams
- 102 – Alfie Burden
- 102 – Graeme Dott
- 102 – Noppon Saengkham
- 101 – He Guoqiang

=== Qualifying stage centuries ===
A total of 27 century breaks were made during the qualifying stage of the tournament in Leicester.

- 140, 104 – Mark Williams
- 137, 131 – Neil Robertson
- 135, 112 – Chris Wakelin
- 130, 127, 101 – Xiao Guodong
- 126, 116 – Wu Yize
- 122 – Jamie Jones
- 116, 103, 100 – Cheung Ka Wai
- 115 – Thepchaiya Un-Nooh
- 113, 100 – David Gilbert
- 113 – Yuan Sijun
- 111 – Amir Sarkhosh
- 108 – Gary Wilson
- 106 – Robbie McGuigan
- 102 – Barry Hawkins
- 102 – Joe Perry
- 102 – Hossein Vafaei
- 100 – Paul Deaville
- 100 – Fan Zhengyi
