= 2024 Wuhan Open (snooker) =

Snooker tournament

2024 Optics Valley of China Wuhan Open

Tournament information
- Dates: 6–12 October 2024
- Venue: China Optics Valley Convention & Exhibition Center
- City: Wuhan
- Country: China
- Organisation: World Snooker Tour
- Format: Ranking event
- Total prize fund: £700,000
- Winner's share: £140,000
- Highest break: Si Jiahui (CHN) (147)

Final
- Champion: Xiao Guodong (CHN)
- Runner-up: Si Jiahui (CHN)
- Score: 10–7

The 2024 Wuhan Open (officially the 2024 Optics Valley of China Wuhan Open) was a professional snooker tournament that took place from 6 to 12 October 2024 at the China Optics Valley Convention & Exhibition Center (COVCEC) in Wuhan, China. The sixth ranking event of the 2024‍–‍25 season, it followed the 2024 British Open and preceded the 2024 Northern Ireland Open. The winner received £140,000 from a total prize fund of £700,000.

Qualifiers took place from 28 to 30 July 2024 at the Leicester Arena in Leicester, England. Qualifying matches featuring the defending champion (Judd Trump); the reigning World Champion (Kyren Wilson); the two highest ranked Chinese players (Ding Junhui and Zhang Anda); four Chinese wildcards (Cai Wei, Wang Xinbo, Zhou Jinhao, and Huang Hao); and Mark Joyce (Note: Mark Joyce replaced Ronnie O'Sullivan who withdrew.) were held over and played in Wuhan.

Trump won the inaugural 2023 event, defeating Ali Carter 10‍–‍7 in the final, but he failed to defend his title, losing 2‍–‍6 in the semi‑finals to Si Jiahui. Xiao Guodong won the tournament, defeating Si 10‍–‍7 in the final to claim the first ranking title of his career. The tournament produced 114 century breaks, with 32 made during the qualifying stage and 82 during the main stage. Si made the tournament's highest break, compiling his first maximum break in professional competition during his semi‑final match with Trump.

== Format ==
The tournament, the second edition of the Wuhan Open, took place from 6 to 12 October 2024 at the China Optics Valley Convention & Exhibition Center (COVCEC) in Wuhan, China. It was the sixth ranking event of the 2024‍–‍25 season, following the 2024 British Open and preceding the 2024 Northern Ireland Open.

All matches up to and including the quarter‑finals were the best of nine frames. The semi‑finals were the best of 11 frames, and the final was the best of 19 frames, played over two sessions.

The qualifying matches were broadcast by the WST Facebook page, by Discovery+ in Europe, and by Matchroom Sport in all other territories. The main stage of the event was broadcast by Eurosport and Discovery+ in Europe (including the United Kingdom and Ireland); by the CBSA‑WPBSA Academy WeChat Channel, CBSA‑WPBSA Academy Douyin and Huya Live in China; by Now TV in Hong Kong; by Astro SuperSport in Malaysia and Brunei; by True Sport in Thailand; by TAP in the Philippines; and by Sportcast in Taiwan. It was available from Matchroom Sport in all other territories.

=== Prize fund ===
The breakdown of prize money for this event is shown below:

- Winner: £140,000
- Runner-up: £63,000
- Semi-final: £30,000
- Quarter-final: £16,000
- Last 16: £12,000
- Last 32: £8,000
- Last 64: £4,500
- Highest break: £5,000
- Total: £700,000

== Summary ==
=== Qualifying round ===
The sixth seed Mark Selby was knocked out in qualifying by Long Zehuang, despite making breaks of 135 and 130. Long took the last four frames for a 5‍–‍4 victory. Ali Carter came back from 0‍–‍2 down to defeat Wang Yuchen 5‍–‍3, and Duane Jones beat the fourth seed Luca Brecel 5‍–‍4. Neil Robertson whitewashed Ken Doherty, and Marco Fu defeated Zhou Yuelong 5‍–‍1.

=== Early rounds ===
==== Held over qualifying matches ====
The held over qualifying matches were played on 6 October as the best of 9 frames. Ronnie O'Sullivan withdrew and was replaced by Mark Joyce. David Gilbert also withdrew but was not replaced and so Wang Xinbo was given a walkover to the last 64. Joyce defeated Mitchell Mann 5‍–‍2. Kyren Wilson beat Liam Davies 5‍–‍1, and Ding Junhui beat Robbie McGuigan 5‍–‍2.

==== Last 64 ====
The last 64 matches were played on 6 and 7 October as the best of 9 frames. Mark Allen withdrew and so Jamie Clarke was given a walkover to the last 32. Jackson Page beat Neil Robertson 5‍–‍1, and Stan Moody beat Ryan Day 5‍–‍4. Ali Carter beat Mark Davis 5‍–‍4, and Marco Fu beat Louis Heathcote 5‍–‍1. Anthony McGill beat Mostafa Dorgham 5‍–‍4 and Judd Trump beat He Guoqiang 5‍–‍2. Amateur player Mark Joyce beat Sanderson Lam 5‍–‍2. Kyren Wilson whitewashed Aaron Hill and Hossein Vafaei defeated Jordan Brown 5‍–‍3. John Higgins beat Fan Zhengyi 5‍–‍4, Shaun Murphy defeated Anthony Hamilton 5‍–‍3, and Ding Junhui whitewashed Xu Si.

==== Last 32 ====
The last 32 matches were played on 8 October as the best of 9 frames. In the afternoon session, Xiao Guodong defeated Kyren Wilson 5‍–‍4, Ali Carter beat Marco Fu 5‍–‍3, Shaun Murphy beat Noppon Saengkham 5‍–‍3, and Long Zehuang whitewashed Jackson Page. In the evening session, amateur player Mark Joyce whitewashed Robbie Williams. Judd Trump beat Anthony McGill 5‍–‍2, Ding Junhui defeated Yuan Sijun 5‍–‍2, and Jack Lisowski beat Jak Jones 5‍–‍1.

==== Last 16 ====
The last 16 matches were played on 9 October as the best of 9 frames. In the afternoon session Judd Trump beat John Higgins 5‍–‍2, Jack Lisowski whitewashed Wu Yize, Long Zehuang beat Ben Woollaston 5‍–‍3, and Shaun Murphy defeated Ali Carter 5‍–‍4. In the evening session Chris Wakelin beat Ding Junhui 5‍–‍3, making three back‑to‑back century breaks. Zhang Anda recovered from 0‍–‍3 down to defeat amateur Mark Joyce 5‍–‍4 on a re‑spotted black in the deciding frame. Si Jiahui beat Duane Jones 5‍–‍2, and Xiao Guodong defeated Barry Hawkins 5‍–‍2.

=== Later rounds ===
==== Quarter-finals ====
The quarter-finals were played on 10 October as the best of 9 frames. In the afternoon session Xiao Guodong beat Shaun Murphy 5‍–‍1, making three back‑to‑back century breaks. After the match Xiao said: "It's great that two Chinese players have reached the semi‑finals in a Chinese event, guaranteeing a spot in the final for one of us. Congratulations to Long Zehuang." Long beat Jack Lisowski 5‍–‍1. Long said: "I didn't expect this scoreline, or to make it to the semi‑finals. I feel like I had a bit of luck. My performance was normal, but in snooker, sometimes you need that bit of luck." In the evening session Si Jiahui defeated Zhang Anda 5‍–‍3. After the match Si said: "Both of us were a bit nervous for the whole game. We both really wanted to win. I've played him [Zhang] a few times before and have lost every time." Judd Trump beat Chris Wakelin 5‍–‍4. Trump said: "It was frustrating at times and especially in that last frame, where it looked like he [Wakelin] was going to fluke a couple of balls and end up winning."

==== Semi-finals ====
The semi-finals were played on 11 October as the best of 11 frames. In the afternoon session Xiao Guodong recovered from 1‍–‍4 down to take five frames in a row and beat Long Zehuang 6‍–‍4. After the match Xiao said: "I'm really happy to make it to the final. Long Zehuang played well today too. Before 4‍–‍1 down, he put me under a lot of pressure. Long has only been a professional for two years and I think he has a lot of potential." In the evening session Si Jiahui defeated the defending champion Judd Trump 6‍–‍2, making the first maximum break of his professional career in the fourth frame and two other century breaks. Si said: "This time I kept a calm mindset playing against Judd [Trump]. I've lost a lot of matches whilst making 60+ breaks against him before, so I didn't think too much about beating him. I just focused on learning from him and playing my own game. Today, I didn't feel much pressure, so I played very smoothly." Trump said: "This is the best performance there has been against me, by quite far. Apart from maybe John Higgins and the odd Ronnie [O'Sullivan] performance, this is as well as you can play. He wasn't even touching the knuckles, everything was going in clean. It was like an exhibition game for him at the end. He was enjoying it so much and would have wanted to stay out there all night."

==== Final ====
The final was played on 12 October as the best of 19 frames, played over two sessions. Si Jiahui played Xiao Guodong in only the third all‑Chinese ranking final, after the 2013 Shanghai Masters and the 2022 German Masters. At the end of the afternoon session Xiao led Si 6‍–‍3 with both players making a century break. Xiao went on to win the match 10‍–‍7. After the match Xiao said: "Si played very well today and we had a high quality final. Having two Chinese players reaching the final on home soil, the crowd were incredibly enthusiastic. Si's comeback in the last few frames made me quite nervous. This title goes to me for now, but he'll have plenty of opportunities in the future." Si said: "I was a bit nervous in the final, but I have no regrets. I played well enough. It's a bit of a pity, but it's okay. I'll come back next time and aim to win my first title."

== Main draw ==
The draw for the tournament is shown below. Numbers in parentheses after the players' names denote the top 32 seeded players, and players in bold denote match winners.

=== Top half ===
**Last 64**; Best of 9 frames
**Judd Trump (ENG) (1)**	**5**
He Guoqiang (CHN)	2
**Anthony McGill (SCO) (32)**	**5**
Mostafa Dorgham (EGY)	4
**John Higgins (SCO) (16)**	**5**
Fan Zhengyi (CHN)	4
Robert Milkins (ENG) (17)	4
**Zak Surety (ENG)**	**5**
Haris Tahir (PAK)	1
**Chris Wakelin (ENG) (24)**	**5**
**David Lilley (ENG)**	**5**
Allan Taylor (ENG)	4
**Yuan Sijun (CHN)**	**5**
Xing Zihao (CHN)	2
Xu Si (CHN)	0
**Ding Junhui (CHN) (8)**	**5**
**Mark Joyce (ENG)**	**5**
Sanderson Lam (ENG)	2
Hammad Miah (ENG)	2
**Robbie Williams (ENG)**	**5**
**Zhang Anda (CHN) (12)**	**5**
Graeme Dott (SCO)	3
**Hossein Vafaei (IRN) (21)**	**5**
Jordan Brown (NIR)	3
Daniel Womersley (ENG) (Note: Daniel Womersley replaced Stuart Carrington who withdrew.)	2
**Si Jiahui (CHN) (20)**	**5**
**Martin O'Donnell (ENG)**	**5**
Sunny Akani (THA)	2
Matthew Selt (ENG)	0
**Pang Junxu (CHN) (29)**	**5**
Ishpreet Singh Chadha (IND)	3
**Duane Jones (WAL)**	**5**

**Last 32**; Best of 9 frames
**(England) Judd Trump (1)**	**5**
(Scotland) Anthony McGill (32)	2
**(Scotland) John Higgins (16)**	**5**
(England) Zak Surety	3
**(England) Chris Wakelin (24)**	**5**
(England) David Lilley	0
(China) Yuan Sijun	2
**(China) Ding Junhui (8)**	**5**
**(England) Mark Joyce**	**5**
(England) Robbie Williams	0
**(China) Zhang Anda (12)**	**5**
(Iran) Hossein Vafaei (21)	3
**(China) Si Jiahui (20)**	**5**
(England) Martin O'Donnell	1
(China) Pang Junxu (29)	4
**(Wales) Duane Jones**	**5**

**Last 16**; Best of 9 frames
**(England) Judd Trump (1)**	**5**
(Scotland) John Higgins (16)	2
**(England) Chris Wakelin (24)**	**5**
(China) Ding Junhui (8)	3
(England) Mark Joyce	4
**(China) Zhang Anda (12)**	**5**
**(China) Si Jiahui (20)**	**5**
(Wales) Duane Jones	2

**Quarter-finals**; Best of 9 frames
**(England) Judd Trump (1)**	**5**
(England) Chris Wakelin (24)	4
(China) Zhang Anda (12)	3
**(China) Si Jiahui (20)**	**5**

**Semi-finals**; Best of 11 frames
(England) Judd Trump (1)	2
**(China) Si Jiahui (20)**	**6**

=== Bottom half ===
**Last 64**; Best of 9 frames
Mark Allen (NIR) (3) (Note: Mark Allen withdrew and so Jamie Clarke was given a walkover to the last 32.)	w/d
**Jamie Clarke (WAL)**	**w/o**
Cheung Ka Wai (HKG)	0
**Wu Yize (CHN)**	**5**
**Jak Jones (WAL) (14)**	**5**
Tian Pengfei (CHN)	3
**Jack Lisowski (ENG) (19)**	**5**
Iulian Boiko (UKR) (Note: Iulian Boiko replaced Sam Craigie who withdrew.)	1
**Elliot Slessor (ENG)**	**5**
Wang Xinbo (CHN) (Note: David Gilbert withdrew and so Wang Xinbo was given a walkover to the last 64.)	2
**Ben Woollaston (ENG)**	**5**
Gary Wilson (ENG) (11)	1
**Jackson Page (WAL)**	**5**
Neil Robertson (AUS) (27)	1
Dylan Emery (WAL)	2
**Long Zehuang (CHN)**	**5**
**Shaun Murphy (ENG) (7)**	**5**
Anthony Hamilton (ENG)	3
**Noppon Saengkham (THA) (26)**	**5**
Jimmy White (ENG)	1
**Ali Carter (ENG) (10)**	**5**
Mark Davis (ENG)	4
**Marco Fu (HKG)**	**5**
Louis Heathcote (ENG)	1
**Stan Moody (ENG)**	**5**
Ryan Day (WAL) (18)	4
Jimmy Robertson (ENG)	3
**Barry Hawkins (ENG) (15)**	**5**
**Xiao Guodong (CHN)**	**5**
Andrew Pagett (WAL)	1
Aaron Hill (IRL)	0
**Kyren Wilson (ENG) (2)**	**5**

**Last 32**; Best of 9 frames
(Wales) Jamie Clarke	4
**(China) Wu Yize**	**5**
(Wales) Jak Jones (14)	1
**(England) Jack Lisowski (19)**	**5**
(England) Elliot Slessor	3
**(England) Ben Woollaston**	**5**
(Wales) Jackson Page	0
**(China) Long Zehuang**	**5**
**(England) Shaun Murphy (7)**	**5**
(Thailand) Noppon Saengkham (26)	3
**(England) Ali Carter (10)**	**5**
(Hong Kong) Marco Fu	3
(England) Stan Moody	3
**(England) Barry Hawkins (15)**	**5**
**(China) Xiao Guodong**	**5**
(England) Kyren Wilson (2)	4

**Last 16**; Best of 9 frames
(China) Wu Yize	0
**(England) Jack Lisowski (19)**	**5**
(England) Ben Woollaston	3
**(China) Long Zehuang**	**5**
**(England) Shaun Murphy (7)**	**5**
(England) Ali Carter (10)	4
(England) Barry Hawkins (15)	2
**(China) Xiao Guodong**	**5**

**Quarter-finals**; Best of 9 frames
(England) Jack Lisowski (19)	1
**(China) Long Zehuang**	**5**
(England) Shaun Murphy (7)	1
**(China) Xiao Guodong**	**5**

**Semi-finals**; Best of 11 frames
(China) Long Zehuang	4
**(China) Xiao Guodong**	**6**

Note: w/d=withdrawn; w/o=walkover

=== Final ===
Final: Best of 19 frames. Referee: Peggy Li; COVCEC, Wuhan, China, 12 October 2024
Si Jiahui (20); China	7–**10**	**Xiao Guodong**; China
Afternoon: 7–**121**, 17–**74**, **128**–8 (109), 49–**57**, 52–**54**, **64**–51, **85**–0, 0–**133** (129), 54–**73**; Evening: 0–**82**, **117**–20 (109), 13–**113** (113), 16–**97**, **76**–24, **131**–6 (131), **83**–0, 46–**78**
(frame 15) **131**	Highest break	129 (frame 8)
**3**	Century breaks	2

== Qualifying ==
Qualification for the tournament took place from 28 to 30 July 2024 at the Leicester Arena in Leicester. Numbers in parentheses after the players' names denote the top 32 seeded players, and players in bold denote match winners.

=== Wuhan ===
Qualifying matches featuring the defending champion (Judd Trump); the reigning World Champion (Kyren Wilson); the two highest ranked Chinese players (Ding Junhui and Zhang Anda); four Chinese wildcards (Cai Wei, Wang Xinbo, Zhou Jinhao, and Huang Hao); and Mark Joyce were held over and played in Wuhan. The results of the held over matches played on 6 October were as follows:

- **Judd Trump** (ENG) (1) **5**–1 Antoni Kowalski (POL)
- **Yuan Sijun** (CHN) **5**–0 Cai Wei (CHN)
- **Zhang Anda** (CHN) (12) **5**–1 Dean Young (SCO)
- **Jordan Brown** (NIR) **5**–3 Zhou Jinhao (CHN)
- **Martin O'Donnell** (ENG) **5**–0 Huang Hao (CHN)
- Mitchell Mann (ENG) 2–**5** **Mark Joyce** (ENG)
- David Gilbert (ENG) (22) w/d–**w/o** **Wang Xinbo** (CHN)
- **Ding Junhui** (CHN) (8) **5**–2 Robbie McGuigan (NIR)
- **Kyren Wilson** (ENG) (2) **5**–1 Liam Davies (WAL)

Note: w/d=withdrawn; w/o=walkover

=== Leicester ===
The results of the qualifying matches played in Leicester were as follows:

==== 28 July ====
- **Sanderson Lam** (ENG) **5**–3 Huang Jiahao (CHN)
- **Fan Zhengyi** (CHN) **5**–0 Mink Nutcharut (THA)
- **He Guoqiang** (CHN) **5**–0 Baipat Siripaporn (THA)
- Stephen Maguire (SCO) (30) 4–**5** **Cheung Ka Wai** (HKG)
- **Xu Si** (CHN) **5**–1 Ian Burns (ENG)
- **Si Jiahui** (CHN) (20) **5**–3 Gong Chenzhi (CHN)
- **Chris Wakelin** (ENG) (24) **5**–1 Ma Hailong (CHN)
- **Barry Hawkins** (ENG) (15) **5**–3 Jiang Jun (CHN)
- **Gary Wilson** (ENG) (11) **5**–4 Alexander Ursenbacher (SUI)
- **Anthony McGill** (SCO) (32) **5**–3 Simon Blackwell (ENG) (Note: Simon Blackwell replaced Martin Gould who withdrew.)
- **Aaron Hill** (IRL) **5**–2 Ashley Carty (ENG)
- **Robert Milkins** (ENG) (17) **5**–1 Farakh Ajaib (PAK)
- **Jamie Clarke** (WAL) **5**–4 Alfie Burden (ENG)
- Ricky Walden (ENG) 4–**5** **Mostafa Dorgham** (EGY)
- **Allan Taylor** (ENG) **5**–0 Joshua Thomond (ENG) (Note: Joshua Thomond replaced Mark Williams who withdrew.)
- **Robbie Williams** (ENG) **5**–4 Kreishh Gurbaxani (IND)
- **John Higgins** (SCO) (16) **5**–1 Ben Mertens (BEL)
- Jamie Jones (WAL) 3–**5** **Haris Tahir** (PAK)
- Mark Selby (ENG) (6) 4–**5** **Long Zehuang** (CHN)
- **Shaun Murphy** (ENG) (7) **5**–1 Michael Holt (ENG)
- Dominic Dale (WAL) 3–**5** **Jimmy White** (ENG)

==== 29 July ====
- Stuart Bingham (ENG) (25) 1–**5** **Xing Zihao** (CHN)
- **Pang Junxu** (CHN) (29) **5**–2 Bulcsú Révész (HUN)
- **Ali Carter** (ENG) (10) **5**–3 Wang Yuchen (HKG)
- **Wu Yize** (CHN) **5**–1 Rory Thor (MAS)
- David Grace (ENG) 3–**5** **Ishpreet Singh Chadha** (IND)
- Manasawin Phetmalaikul (THA) 4–**5** **Iulian Boiko** (UKR)
- **Tian Pengfei** (CHN) **5**–3 Andrew Higginson (ENG)
- **Hossein Vafaei** (IRN) (21) **5**–0 Ahmed Aly Elsayed (USA)
- **Ryan Day** (WAL) (18) **5**–3 Liu Hongyu (CHN)
- Scott Donaldson (SCO) 1–**5** **Zak Surety** (ENG)
- **Graeme Dott** (SCO) **5**–2 Julien Leclercq (BEL)
- Tom Ford (ENG) (13) 2–**5** **Sunny Akani** (THA)
- **Matthew Selt** (ENG) **5**–2 Liam Pullen (ENG)
- Joe Perry (ENG) 4–**5** **Daniel Womersley** (ENG)
- **Anthony Hamilton** (ENG) **5**–4 Reanne Evans (ENG)
- **Elliot Slessor** (ENG) **5**–3 Artemijs Žižins (LVA)
- Luca Brecel (BEL) (4) 4–**5** **Duane Jones** (WAL)
- **Ben Woollaston** (ENG) **5**–1 Oliver Lines (ENG)
- **David Lilley** (ENG) **5**–1 Mohammed Shehab (UAE)
- **Noppon Saengkham** (THA) (26) **5**–1 Daniel Wells (WAL)
- Joe O'Connor (ENG) (28) 3–**5** **Hammad Miah** (ENG)

==== 30 July ====
- **Mark Allen** (NIR) (3) **5**–1 Bai Yulu (CHN)
- **Jackson Page** (WAL) **5**–3 Lei Peifan (CHN)
- Thepchaiya Un-Nooh (THA) 4–**5** **Louis Heathcote** (ENG)
- **Dylan Emery** (WAL) **5**–1 Lim Kok Leong (MAS)
- Lyu Haotian (CHN) (31) 1–**5** **Andrew Pagett** (WAL)
- **Xiao Guodong** (CHN) **5**–1 Haydon Pinhey (ENG)
- Zhou Yuelong (CHN) (23) 1–**5** **Marco Fu** (HKG)
- **Jimmy Robertson** (ENG) **5**–2 Amir Sarkhosh (IRN)
- **Neil Robertson** (AUS) (27) **5**–0 Ken Doherty (IRL)
- **Jack Lisowski** (ENG) (19) **5**–2 Liam Graham (SCO)
- **Jak Jones** (WAL) (14) **5**–3 Ross Muir (SCO)
- **Mark Davis** (ENG) **5**–3 Chris Totten (SCO)
- Matthew Stevens (WAL) 2–**5** **Stan Moody** (ENG)

== Century breaks ==
=== Main stage centuries ===
A total of 82 century breaks were made during the main stage of the tournament in Wuhan.

- 147, 144, 131, 114, 109, 109, 108, 107, 100 – Si Jiahui
- 141, 104 – Long Zehuang
- 139, 132, 128 – Chris Wakelin
- 139, 132 – Mark Joyce
- 139, 130, 129, 125, 121, 113, 113, 112 – Xiao Guodong
- 139, 115, 115 – Wu Yize
- 139, 108 – Marco Fu
- 139 – He Guoqiang
- 137, 124, 109 – Zhang Anda
- 136, 130, 117, 106, 103 – Jack Lisowski
- 134 – Duane Jones
- 132, 100 – Barry Hawkins
- 130, 111, 110, 102 – Ding Junhui
- 126 – John Higgins
- 123, 118, 111, 109, 108 – Kyren Wilson
- 123, 116, 109, 105, 103, 101 – Judd Trump
- 122, 112, 105, 101 – Shaun Murphy
- 121 – David Lilley
- 119 – Zak Surety
- 118 – Neil Robertson
- 113, 107 – Ali Carter
- 113 – Louis Heathcote
- 113 – Daniel Womersley
- 111, 100 – Jordan Brown
- 107 – Martin O'Donnell
- 106, 105 – Pang Junxu
- 105, 101 – Anthony McGill
- 103 – Sanderson Lam
- 102 – Ryan Day
- 102 – Fan Zhengyi
- 102 – Jackson Page
- 102 – Yuan Sijun
- 101 – Jak Jones
- 101 – Ben Woollaston

=== Qualifying stage centuries ===
A total of 32 century breaks were made during the qualifying stage of the tournament in Leicester.

- 135, 130 – Mark Selby
- 135 – Ali Carter
- 135 – Julien Leclercq
- 135 – Stan Moody
- 132, 123 – Xu Si
- 129 – Fan Zhengyi
- 127 – Noppon Saengkham
- 127 – Chris Totten
- 126 – Jack Lisowski
- 124 – Jamie Jones
- 122, 100 – Mark Davis
- 116, 102 – Jak Jones
- 114 – Anthony Hamilton
- 108 – Lei Peifan
- 108 – Haris Tahir
- 106 – Ben Woollaston
- 105 – Marco Fu
- 105 – Aaron Hill
- 105 – Matthew Selt
- 105 – Alexander Ursenbacher
- 105 – Daniel Womersley
- 104 – Iulian Boiko
- 103 – Barry Hawkins
- 102 – Sunny Akani
- 102 – Mark Allen
- 102 – Joe O'Connor
- 102 – Manasawin Phetmalaikul
- 101 – Neil Robertson
