= 2024 British Open =

Snooker tournament

2024 Unibet British Open

Tournament information
- Dates: 23–29 September 2024
- Venue: The Centaur
- City: Cheltenham
- Country: England
- Organisation: World Snooker Tour
- Format: Ranking event
- Total prize fund: £502,000
- Winner's share: £100,000
- Highest break: Mark Allen (NIR) (147)

Final
- Champion: Mark Selby (ENG)
- Runner-up: John Higgins (SCO)
- Score: 10–5

The 2024 British Open (officially the 2024 Unibet British Open) was a professional snooker tournament that took place from 23 to 29 September 2024 at the Centaur in Cheltenham, England. Qualifying (round 1) took place from 31 July to 3 August 2024 at the Leicester Arena in Leicester. The fifth ranking tournament of the 2024‍–‍25 season, it followed the 2024 English Open and preceded the 2024 Wuhan Open. It was organised by the World Snooker Tour and sponsored by online gambling platform Unibet. The winner received £100,000 from a total prize fund of £502,000 and the Clive Everton Trophy. Everton died on 27 September, two days before the tournament concluded.

The defending champion was Mark Williams, who defeated Mark Selby 10‍–‍7 in the 2023 final, but he lost 1‍–‍4 to Rory Thor in qualifying (round 1). Selby won the tournament, beating John Higgins 10‍–‍5 in the final to capture his first British Open title and the 23rd ranking title of his career, as well as his first at a tournament broadcast by ITV. The event produced 55 century breaks, 12 in qualifying and 43 in the main stage; the highest was a maximum break by Mark Allen in his third‑round match against Ben Mertens. Judd Trump made his 1,000th century break in professional competition during his quarter-final match against Allen, becoming the third player to reach that milestone, after Ronnie O'Sullivan and John Higgins.

== Format ==
The draw was randomised after each round. All matches before the quarter-final stage were played as the best of seven frames, while the quarter-finals were the best of nine frames, the semi-finals were the best of 11 frames, and the final was the best of 19 frames. The winner received the Clive Everton trophy and secured a place in the 2024 Champion of Champions tournament.

The qualifying matches were broadcast by the WST Facebook page, by Discovery+ in Europe, and by Matchroom Sport in all other territories. The main stage of the event was broadcast by ITV and ITVX in the United Kingdom; by Eurosport and Discovery+ in Europe (excluding the United Kingdom and Ireland); by the CBSA-WPBSA Academy WeChat Channel, CBSA-WPBSA Academy Douyin and Huya Live in China; by Now TV in Hong Kong; by Astro SuperSport in Malaysia and Brunei; by TrueVision in Thailand; by TAP in the Philippines; and by Sportcast in Taiwan. It was available from Matchroom Sport in all other territories.

=== Prize fund ===
The winner of the event received £100,000 from a total prize fund of £502,000. The breakdown of prize money for this event is shown below:

- Winner: £100,000
- Runner-up: £45,000
- Semi-final: £20,000
- Quarter-final: £12,000
- Last 16: £9,000
- Last 32: £6,000
- Last 64: £3,000
- Highest break: £5,000
- Total: £502,000

== Summary ==
=== Qualifying (round 1) ===
==== Leicester ====
Qualifying for the tournament took place from 31 July to 3 August 2024 at the Leicester Arena in Leicester, England, although qualifiers featuring the top 18 (Note: Top 18 players rather than 16 in the held-over matches because Gary Wilson (ranked 11) was drawn against Mark Allen (ranked 1) and Robert Milkins (ranked 17) was drawn against Judd Trump (ranked 2).) players in the snooker world rankings were held over to be played in Cheltenham.

Thepchaiya Un-Nooh beat Alexander Ursenbacher 4‍–‍1 in a match that lasted less than an hour, and David Grace defeated Jack Lisowski 4‍–‍2. Neil Robertson beat Andrew Pagett 4‍–‍1, and Chris Totten whitewashed Jimmy White. Amateur players Mark Joyce (Note: Mark Joyce replaced Stuart Carrington who withdrew.) and Anton Kazakov (Note: Anton Kazakov replaced Martin Gould who withdrew.) won their matches over Xing Zihao and Ahmed Aly Elsayed respectively. Stuart Bingham beat He Guoqiang 4‍–‍3, Stan Moody defeated Joe O'Connor 4‍–‍2, and Marco Fu beat Joshua Thomond 4‍–‍1. Oliver Lines defeated Lei Peifan 4‍–‍3, and amateur player Simon Blackwell beat the 2024 world women's champion Bai Yulu 4‍–‍2. David Gilbert whitewashed amateur player Dylan Emery, and Elliot Slessor beat amateur player Joshua Cooper (Note: Joshua Cooper replaced Sam Craigie who withdrew.) 4‍–‍1.

==== Cheltenham ====
On 23 September there were some issues with playing conditions in Cheltenham, and Mark Allen said that "It's some of the worst weather outside and they've left the massive transport doors open. It's so cold, it's so humid, out there. The table needs to be burned."

In the held‑over qualifying matches played in Cheltenham, Rory Thor beat the defending champion Mark Williams 4‍–‍1. Aaron Hill beat Ding Junhui 4‍–‍3, and Gong Chenzhi beat Tom Ford 4‍–‍3. Bulcsú Révész defeated Ali Carter 4‍–‍3, and Liam Davies beat Barry Hawkins 4‍–‍1. Ronnie O'Sullivan withdrew and was replaced by Lewis Ullah. (Note: Lewis Ullah replaced Ronnie O'Sullivan who withdrew.) Ullah defeated Manasawin Phetmalaikul 4‍–‍2.

=== Early rounds ===
==== Round 2 ====
Round 2 (last 64) matches were played on 24 and 25 September as the best of 7 frames. Amateur player Iulian Boiko beat Si Jiahui 4‍–‍1, and Graeme Dott beat Zhou Yuelong also by 4‍–‍1. Stan Moody whitewashed Michael Holt and Thepchaiya Un-Nooh whitewashed Noppon Saengkham. Jak Jones whitewashed Alfie Burden and Ashley Carty whitewashed Long Zehuang. Mark Davis beat Xiao Guodong, Luca Brecel beat Tian Pengfei, and Judd Trump beat Ryan Day, all by 4‍–‍2. Liam Davies whitewashed Anton Kazakov, and Zhang Anda beat Hossein Vafaei 4‍–‍1. John Higgins beat Shaun Murphy 4‍–‍2, and Kyren Wilson beat Duane Jones 4‍–‍1.

==== Round 3 ====
Round 3 (last 32) matches were played on 25 and 26 September as the best of 7 frames. Stan Moody beat Zhang Anda, Mark Selby beat Yuan Sijun, Stephen Maguire beat Stuart Bingham, and Rory Thor beat Neil Robertson, all by 4‍–‍3. Mark Allen made his 4th professional maximum break in his match against Ben Mertens, which he went on to win 4‍–‍1. Thepchaiya Un-Nooh beat Ricky Walden 4‍–‍3, and Kyren Wilson whitewashed Marco Fu.

=== Later rounds ===
==== Round 4 ====
Round 4 (last 16) matches were played on 26 September as the best of 7 frames. Elliot Slessor beat Kyren Wilson 4‍–‍2, Oliver Lines beat Stan Moody 4‍–‍1, Jak Jones beat Luca Brecel 4‍–‍2, and John Higgins whitewashed Rory Thor.

==== Quarter finals ====
The quarter-finals were played on 27 September as the best of 9 frames. Before the matches started there was a one-minute silence in honour of Clive Everton who had died at the age of 87, and after whom the tournament trophy is named. In the afternoon session John Higgins beat Elliot Slessor 5‍–‍1 and Mark Selby beat David Gilbert 5‍–‍4. In the evening session, in the match between Judd Trump and Mark Allen, Trump made his 1,000th professional career century break in the second frame, becoming the third player to reach this number, after Ronnie O'Sullivan and John Higgins. However, Allen went on to win the match 5‍–‍3. Oliver Lines beat Jak Jones 5‍–‍4.

==== Semi finals ====
The semi-finals were played on 28 September as the best of 11 frames. In the afternoon session John Higgins played Oliver Lines. This was the first ranking event semi‑final for Lines. Higgins whitewashed Lines. After the match Higgins said: "I have not won silverware for a few years and I just love the feeling of being the last man standing, that's why I keep going. I am going to have a monumental game tomorrow, they [Selby and Allen] are both immovable objects who are so tough to compete against. I hope it [the second semi‑final] goes 6‍–‍5 tonight either way." Lines said: "Nerves got the better of me. I wanted to at least show why I made the semi‑final. Even the easiest pots were looking so hard. I have played well all week and I hoped I could find something today, but mentally I didn't give myself a chance, I didn't handle it."

In the evening session Mark Selby played Mark Allen. In the first frame of the match, after more than 30 minutes of safety play, the players asked referee Kevin Dabrowski for a re‑rack and started the match again. At the mid‑session interval, after more than two hours of playing time, Selby led Allen 3‍–‍1. Selby went on to win the match 6‍–‍3, with both players making century breaks. After the match Selby said: "John [Higgins] and I will be battling out there tomorrow, giving it everything. I have so much time for him, every time I see him we have a laugh and get on well." Allen said: "One or two shots could have made a difference. I feel my game is in good enough shape and I'm looking forward to the next tournament."

==== Final ====
The final was played on 29 September as the best of 19 frames, played over two sessions and officiated by Ben Williams. Mark Selby played John Higgins in Selby's 35th ranking final, and Higgins' 56th. At the end of the afternoon session Selby led Higgins 5‍–‍3. Selby went on to win 10‍–‍5, capturing his first British Open title and the 23rd ranking title of his career. It was Selby's first ranking title since the 2023 WST Classic in March 2023. Afterwards, Selby said: "The first session was incredible, I think my pot success was 98% and John's was 96%. Tonight wasn't quite as good, I missed one red at 7‍–‍4 but apart from that I made very few mistakes and I took my chances when I had them." Higgins said "Mark put on a clinic tonight, he was too good for me. My big moment was the tenth frame when I had a chance to make it 5‍–‍5 but couldn't take it."

== Main draw ==
Match winners are shown in bold.

=== Round 2 ===
All matches were the best of seven frames.

==== 24 September morning session ====
- **Mark Selby** (ENG) **w/o**–w/d Lim Kok Leong (MAS) (Note: Lim Kok Leong withdrew and so Mark Selby was given a walkover.)
- Ma Hailong (CHN) 2–**4** **Marco Fu** (HKG)
- Si Jiahui (CHN) 1–**4** **Iulian Boiko** (UKR)
- **Graeme Dott** (SCO) **4**–1 Zhou Yuelong (CHN)
- **Yuan Sijun** (CHN) **4**–2 Robbie Williams (ENG)

Note: w/d=withdrawn; w/o=walkover

==== 24 September afternoon session ====
- **Chris Wakelin** (ENG) **4**–2 Wu Yize (CHN)
- **Haris Tahir** (PAK) **4**–1 Simon Blackwell (ENG)
- **Neil Robertson** (AUS) **4**–1 Chris Totten (SCO)
- Gong Chenzhi (CHN) 1–**4** **Xu Si** (CHN)
- **Stan Moody** (ENG) **4**–0 Michael Holt (ENG)
- **Thepchaiya Un-Nooh** (THA) **4**–0 Noppon Saengkham (THA)
- Aaron Hill (IRL) 1–**4** **Mark Allen** (NIR)

==== 24 September evening session ====
- **Mark Davis** (ENG) **4**–2 Xiao Guodong (CHN)
- **Ashley Carty** (ENG) **4**–0 Long Zehuang (CHN)
- Ryan Day (WAL) 2–**4** **Judd Trump** (ENG)
- **Jak Jones** (WAL) **4**–0 Alfie Burden (ENG)
- **Stephen Maguire** (SCO) **4**–1 Liam Graham (SCO)
- **Elliot Slessor** (ENG) **4**–3 Martin O'Donnell (ENG)
- Tian Pengfei (CHN) 2–**4** **Luca Brecel** (BEL)
- Bulcsú Révész (HUN) 0–**4** **Stuart Bingham** (ENG)

==== 25 September morning session ====
- Allan Taylor (ENG) 1–**4** **Lyu Haotian** (CHN)
- Cheung Ka Wai (HKG) 3–**4** **Oliver Lines** (ENG)
- Anton Kazakov (UKR) 0–**4** **Liam Davies** (WAL)
- Hossein Vafaei (IRN) 1–**4** **Zhang Anda** (CHN)

==== 25 September afternoon session ====
- **David Gilbert** (ENG) **4**–1 Ben Woollaston (ENG)
- **Sunny Akani** (THA) **4**–1 Antoni Kowalski (POL)
- **Rory Thor** (MAS) **4**–3 Mark Joyce (ENG)
- **Kyren Wilson** (ENG) **4**–1 Duane Jones (WAL)
- **Ricky Walden** (ENG) **4**–0 Jamie Clarke (WAL)
- Hammad Miah (ENG) 1–**4** **Ben Mertens** (BEL)
- **John Higgins** (SCO) **4**–2 Shaun Murphy (ENG)
- **David Grace** (ENG) **4**–0 Lewis Ullah (ENG)

=== Round 3 ===
All matches were the best of seven frames.

==== 25 September evening session ====
- **Jak Jones** (WAL) **4**–1 Iulian Boiko (UKR)
- Zhang Anda (CHN) 3–**4** **Stan Moody** (ENG)
- **Mark Selby** (ENG) **4**–3 Yuan Sijun (CHN)
- Haris Tahir (PAK) 2–**4** **Lyu Haotian** (CHN)
- Stuart Bingham (ENG) 3–**4** **Stephen Maguire** (SCO)
- **David Gilbert** (ENG) **4**–3 Ashley Carty (ENG)
- **Elliot Slessor** (ENG) **4**–3 Xu Si (CHN)
- Neil Robertson (AUS) 3–**4** **Rory Thor** (MAS)

==== 26 September afternoon session ====
- **Oliver Lines** (ENG) **4**–3 Sunny Akani (THA)
- **John Higgins** (SCO) **4**–2 Graeme Dott (SCO)
- Mark Davis (ENG) 2–**4** **Judd Trump** (ENG)
- Ricky Walden (ENG) 3–**4** **Thepchaiya Un-Nooh** (THA)
- Ben Mertens (BEL) 1–**4** **Mark Allen** (NIR)
- Marco Fu (HKG) 0–**4** **Kyren Wilson** (ENG)
- David Grace (ENG) 2–**4** **Chris Wakelin** (ENG)
- Liam Davies (WAL) 1–**4** **Luca Brecel** (BEL)

=== Round 4 ===
All matches were the best of seven frames.

==== 26 September evening session ====
- Lyu Haotian (CHN) 3–**4** **David Gilbert** (ENG)
- **Judd Trump** (ENG) **4**–2 Stephen Maguire (SCO)
- Rory Thor (MAS) 0–**4** **John Higgins** (SCO)
- **Oliver Lines** (ENG) **4**–1 Stan Moody (ENG)
- Chris Wakelin (ENG) 3–**4** **Mark Allen** (NIR)
- **Elliot Slessor** (ENG) **4**–2 Kyren Wilson (ENG)
- **Jak Jones** (WAL) **4**–2 Luca Brecel (BEL)
- Thepchaiya Un-Nooh (THA) 3–**4** **Mark Selby** (ENG)

=== Quarter finals ===
All matches were the best of nine frames.

==== 27 September afternoon session ====
- Elliot Slessor (ENG) 1–**5** **John Higgins** (SCO)
- David Gilbert (ENG) 4–**5** **Mark Selby** (ENG)

==== 27 September evening session ====
- Judd Trump (ENG) 3–**5** **Mark Allen** (NIR)
- Jak Jones (WAL) 4–**5** **Oliver Lines** (ENG)

=== Semi finals ===
Matches were the best of eleven frames.

==== 28 September afternoon session ====
- **John Higgins** (SCO) **6**–0 Oliver Lines (ENG)

==== 28 September evening session ====
- **Mark Selby** (ENG) **6**–3 Mark Allen (NIR)

=== Final ===
Final: Best of 19 frames. Referee: Ben Williams; The Centaur, Cheltenham, England, 29 September 2024
| **Mark Selby**; England | **10**–5 | John Higgins; Scotland |
Afternoon: **100**–12, 0–**84**, 10–**61**, **85**–1, **137**–0 (137), **88**–43, 4–**106** (105), **135**–0 (135); Evening: 31–**69**, **78**–32, **95**–34, 25–**86**, **69**–22, **91**–0, **93**–0
| (frame 5) **137** | Highest break | 105 (frame 7) |
| **2** | Century breaks | 1 |

== Qualifying (round 1) ==
The qualification matches are shown below. Match winners are shown in bold.

=== Cheltenham ===
The results of the held over matches played in Cheltenham on 23 September were as follows:

- Mark Williams (WAL) 1–**4** **Rory Thor** (MAS)
- **Mark Allen** (NIR) **4**–3 Gary Wilson (ENG)
- Ding Junhui (CHN) 3–**4** **Aaron Hill** (IRL)
- Tom Ford (ENG) 3–**4** **Gong Chenzhi** (CHN)
- **Judd Trump** (ENG) **4**–1 Robert Milkins (ENG)
- **Luca Brecel** (BEL) **4**–1 Mohammed Shehab (UAE)
- **John Higgins** (SCO) **4**–1 Ross Muir (SCO)
- **Ryan Day** (WAL) **4**–1 Louis Heathcote (ENG)
- Manasawin Phetmalaikul (THA) 2–**4** **Lewis Ullah** (ENG)
- **Shaun Murphy** (ENG) **4**–0 Ian Burns (ENG)
- Ali Carter (ENG) 3–**4** **Bulcsú Révész** (HUN)
- Barry Hawkins (ENG) 1–**4** **Liam Davies** (WAL)
- **Kyren Wilson** (ENG) **4**–0 Julien Leclercq (BEL)
- **Mark Selby** (ENG) **4**–3 Pang Junxu (CHN)
- **Zhang Anda** (CHN) **4**–2 Jordan Brown (NIR)
- **Jak Jones** (WAL) **4**–2 Sanderson Lam (ENG)

=== Leicester ===
The results of the qualifying matches played in Leicester were as follows:

==== 31 July ====
- **Si Jiahui** (CHN) **4**–2 David Lilley (ENG)
- Alexander Ursenbacher (SUI) 1–**4** **Thepchaiya Un-Nooh** (THA)
- Ishpreet Singh Chadha (IND) 1–**4** **Jamie Clarke** (WAL)
- **Iulian Boiko** (UKR) **4**–2 Farakh Ajaib (PAK)
- Artemijs Žižins (LVA) 3–**4** **Allan Taylor** (ENG)
- Mink Nutcharut (THA) 1–**4** **Liam Graham** (SCO)
- Robbie McGuigan (NIR) 0–**4** **Mark Davis** (ENG)
- **David Grace** (ENG) **4**–2 Jack Lisowski (ENG)
- **Ma Hailong** (CHN) **4**–2 Jimmy Robertson (ENG)
- **Noppon Saengkham** (THA) **4**–3 Joe Perry (ENG)
- **Martin O'Donnell** (ENG) **4**–1 Mitchell Mann (ENG)
- **Michael Holt** (ENG) **4**–0 Reanne Evans (ENG)

==== 1 August ====
- **Xu Si** (CHN) **4**–2 Ken Doherty (IRL)
- Fan Zhengyi (CHN) 2–**4** **Zhou Yuelong** (CHN)
- **Ricky Walden** (ENG) **4**–3 Liu Hongyu (CHN)
- Andrew Pagett (WAL) 1–**4** **Neil Robertson** (AUS)
- Xing Zihao (CHN) 3–**4** **Mark Joyce** (ENG)
- Jimmy White (ENG) 0–**4** **Chris Totten** (SCO)
- Mostafa Dorgham (EGY) 1–**4** **Hossein Vafaei** (IRN)
- **Chris Wakelin** (ENG) **4**–0 Haydon Pinhey (ENG)
- Amir Sarkhosh (IRN) 3–**4** **Ashley Carty** (ENG)
- Jiang Jun (CHN) 1–**4** **Stephen Maguire** (SCO)
- **Duane Jones** (WAL) **4**–2 Dominic Dale (WAL)
- Ahmed Aly Elsayed (USA) 2–**4** **Anton Kazakov** (UKR)

==== 2 August ====
- **Xiao Guodong** (CHN) **4**–2 Huang Jiahao (CHN)
- **Lim Kok Leong** (MAS) **4**–1 Anthony Hamilton (ENG)
- **Stuart Bingham** (ENG) **4**–3 He Guoqiang (CHN)
- Joe O'Connor (ENG) 2–**4** **Stan Moody** (ENG)
- Jamie Jones (WAL) 2–**4** **Yuan Sijun** (CHN)
- Wang Yuchen (HKG) 2–**4** **Hammad Miah** (ENG)
- Joshua Thomond (ENG) 1–**4** **Marco Fu** (HKG)
- Liam Pullen (ENG) 0–**4** **Long Zehuang** (CHN)
- **Alfie Burden** (ENG) **4**–3 Andrew Higginson (ENG)
- **Antoni Kowalski** (POL) **4**–1 Daniel Wells (WAL)
- Matthew Selt (ENG) 3–**4** **Ben Woollaston** (ENG)
- **Sunny Akani** (THA) **4**–0 Daniel Womersley (ENG)

==== 3 August ====
- **Simon Blackwell** (ENG) **4**–2 Bai Yulu (CHN)
- **Cheung Ka Wai** (HKG) **4**–0 Kreishh Gurbaxani (IND)
- **Oliver Lines** (ENG) **4**–3 Lei Peifan (CHN)
- Baipat Siripaporn (THA) 1–**4** **Wu Yize** (CHN)
- **Lyu Haotian** (CHN) **4**–0 Anthony McGill (SCO)
- Scott Donaldson (SCO) 2–**4** **Tian Pengfei** (CHN)
- **Graeme Dott** (SCO) **4**–1 Matthew Stevens (WAL)
- **David Gilbert** (ENG) **4**–0 Dylan Emery (WAL)
- Dean Young (SCO) 3–**4** **Haris Tahir** (PAK)
- Zak Surety (ENG) 1–**4** **Ben Mertens** (BEL)
- **Elliot Slessor** (ENG) **4**–1 Joshua Cooper (ENG)
- Jackson Page (WAL) 1–**4** **Robbie Williams** (ENG)

== Century breaks ==
=== Main stage centuries ===
A total of 43 century breaks were made during the main stage of the tournament in Cheltenham.

- 147, 130, 102, 101 – Mark Allen
- 137, 135, 125, 115, 105, 101, 100 – Mark Selby
- 133 – Tian Pengfei
- 132, 105, 102 – John Higgins
- 132 – Ben Woollaston
- 131, 129, 105 – Yuan Sijun
- 128, 109 – Jak Jones
- 128 – Elliot Slessor
- 127 – Stephen Maguire
- 122, 102, 101 – Lyu Haotian
- 117 – Tom Ford
- 117 – Aaron Hill
- 115 – Thepchaiya Un-Nooh
- 114 – Kyren Wilson
- 114 – Zhang Anda
- 110 – Sanderson Lam
- 109 – Xiao Guodong
- 108 – David Gilbert
- 107 – Xu Si
- 105 – Shaun Murphy
- 104, 101 – Judd Trump
- 102 – Marco Fu
- 102 – Oliver Lines
- 101 – Ma Hailong
- 100 – Louis Heathcote
- 100 – Neil Robertson

=== Qualifying stage centuries ===
A total of 12 century breaks were made during the qualifying stage of the tournament in Leicester.

- 127, 100 – Noppon Saengkham
- 120 – Xu Si
- 116 – Oliver Lines
- 111 – Wu Yize
- 108 – Mark Davis
- 104, 102 – Long Zehuang
- 102 – Jamie Jones
- 101 – David Grace
- 100 – Stan Moody
- 100 – Xiao Guodong
