= Stan Moody =

English snooker player

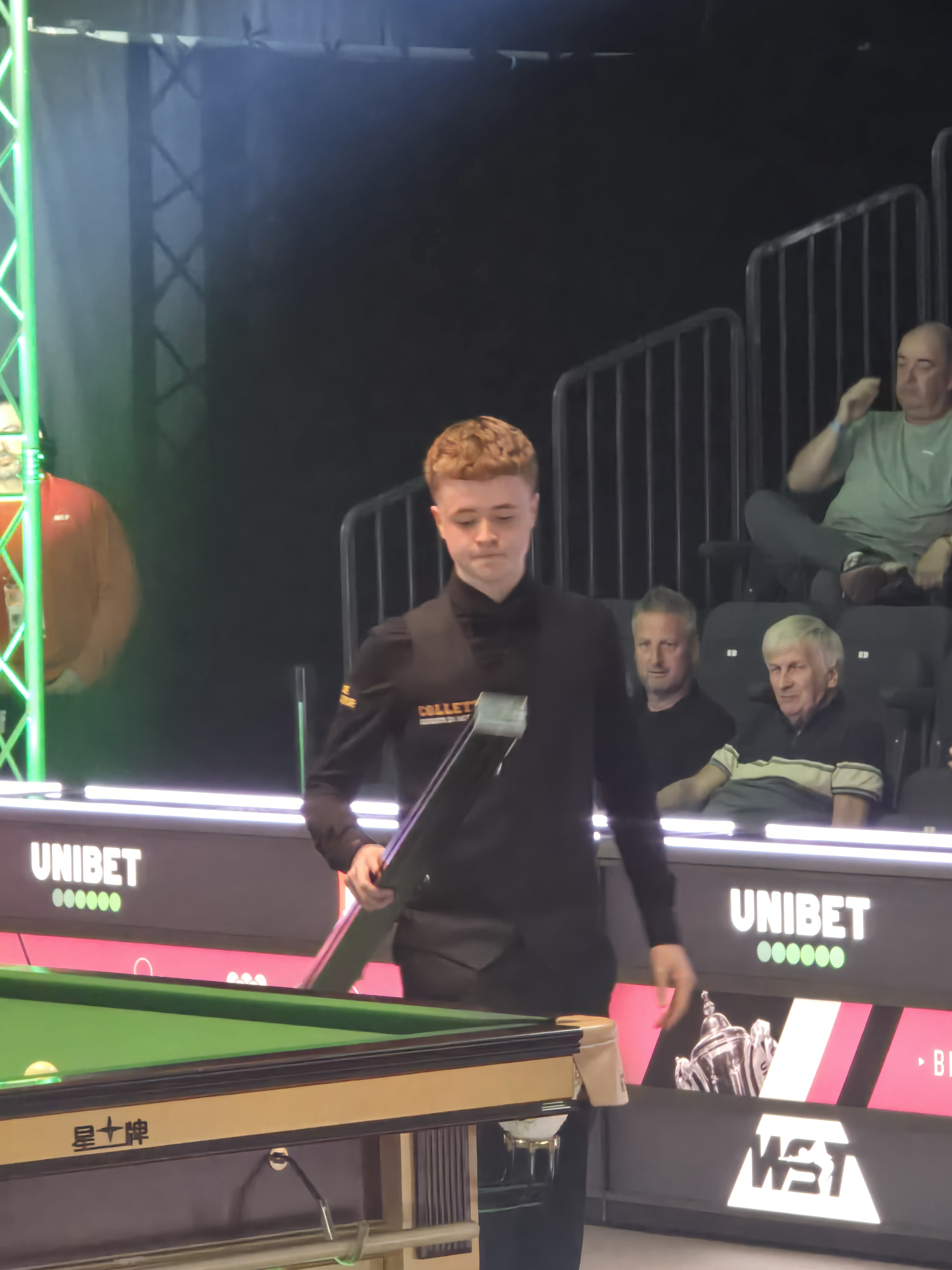
- Moody at the 2025 British Open

Personal information
- Nickname: The Action
- Born: 14 September 2006 (age 20) Halifax, West Yorkshire, England

Sport
- Country: England
- Sport: Snooker
- Professional: 2023–present
- Highest ranking: 37 (July 2026)
- Current ranking: 44 (as of 7 November 2026)
- Best ranking finish: Quarter-final (x3)

Stan Moody (born 14 September 2006) is an English professional snooker player from Halifax, West Yorkshire. In February 2023 he won the WSF World Junior Championship, and turned professional that year. Competing on the World Snooker Tour he was a two-time quarter-finalist during the 2025–26 snooker season.

== Early life ==
Moody, a pupil at Ryburn Valley High School in Sowerby Bridge, Yorkshire, started playing snooker in 2015 after first playing pool during a family holiday. He won English national snooker championships at under-14, under-16 and under-18 levels. After playing him in an exhibition match in Bradford, Mark Allen was impressed with Moody's cue action and nicknamed him "The Action".

== Career ==
=== 2021–22 season ===
In January 2022 Moody marked his debut ranking event match, and first televised match, with a first-round win over the top-32 player Lu Ning at the 2022 Snooker Shoot Out, held at the Leicester Arena in Leicester, England. The win gained Moody plaudits from the likes of Jimmy White who described him as a “serious player”, and led to Moody being dubbed “a future star of the sport”. Speaking after the match Moody described the experience by saying “I was a bit nervous to start with but once I had potted a few balls I felt composed, I kept my nerve... It surprised me, how bright the TV lights were. The table was amazing, quicker than what I am used to. The crowd was good”. In the next round he lost to Oliver Lines in the lowest scoring shoot-out match of all time. Lines called it a “nightmare draw” for him because he and Moody practise regularly together at the Northern Snooker Centre in Leeds. In March 2022 Moody finished the season as the runner-up in the EPSB Under-21 Premier Development Tour standings to Burnley's Lewis Ullah.

=== 2022–23 season ===
At the WSF Junior Snooker Championship held in Sydney, Australia in February 2023 Moody showed tremendous form, dropping just one frame in the round-robin phase of the competition with 3-0 wins over Zac Cosker and Christiano de Azevedo, and overcoming Devlen Brown 3–1. In the last 16 and quarter-finals he whitewashed Jayden Dinga and Jake Crofts 4–0. Moody defeated Ukrainian Iulian Boiko 4–3 in the semi-finals before winning the final 5–1 against Liam Pullen. With this win he was awarded a two-year place on the World Snooker Tour from the 2023–24 snooker season. That same month Moody reached the final of the WSF Championship in Sydney where he lost to Ma Hai Long.

He entered into the invitational 2023 Six-red World Championship held in Pathum Thani, Thailand in March 2023.

=== 2023–24 season ===
Moody was entered into the draw at the 2023 Championship League held at the Morningside Arena in Leicester, England from 26 June 2023. He started with defeats to Wu Yize and Pang Junxu before earning a draw with Hammad Miah. At the English Open in October 2023, he took World Champion Luca Brecel to a deciding frame, before losing 4-3. During the match he completed a 121-point century, the highest of his pro-career.

Moody secured his first win as a professional in October 2023, qualifying for the Northern Ireland Open with a win over Zhou Yuelong. He followed up that victory with wins over Rod Lawler and Gary Wilson to reach the last-16 of a ranking event for the first time. He did not progress past the last-16, however, as he lost to Yuan Sijun 4-2. He qualified for the 2024 Welsh Open with a 4-2 win over Sean O'Sullivan.

=== 2024–25 season ===
He reached the third round of the 2024 Saudi Arabia Snooker Masters with a 4-1 win over Liam Pullen.

At the 2024 British Open he completed a whitewash victory over Michael Holt and followed up that win by reaching the last 16 of a ranking event for the second time in his career with a 4-3 victory over world number 12 Zhang Anda. He defeated Ryan Day on his way to the last-32 at the 2024 Wuhan Open where he was defeated by Barry Hawkins. He reached the last-16 at the 2024 Northern Ireland Open with a run including wins over Ben Woollaston and Jak Jones, before losing to Kyren Wilson. He recorded a 5-0 whitewash win over Ahmed Aly Elsayed in qualifying for the 2025 German Masters, making two centuries including a 133. He hit a 134 break on his way to a 4-3 win over Anthony Hamilton to reach the last-64 at the Welsh Open in February 2025, where he was edged out 4-3 by Mark Allen.

=== 2025–26 season ===
In June 2025, he was drawn to make his season debut in the first round of qualifying for the 2025 Wuhan Open where he defeated Antoni Kowalski of Poland 5-2. He reached the last-48 of the 2025 Saudi Arabia Snooker Masters.

He recorded a shock 5-3 win over home favourite Ding Junhui before beating Zhou Yuelong 5-1 and Barry Hawkins 5-0 to reach the quarter-final at the 2025 Wuhan Open where his run was ended by Xiao Guodong. He was a quarter-finalist at the 2025 British Open, earning wins against Ali Carter and former world champion Kyren Wilson. Moody recorded a win over John Higgins at the 2026 World Open. In the qualifying rounds for the 2026 World Snooker Championship, Moody defeated Robbie Williams and Jiang Jun in a deciding frame, to become the first British teenager to make his Crucible debut since Judd Trump in 2007. At the championships, Moody exited in the first round following a 7–10 defeat by Kyren Wilson. Moody had led 7–3 before Wilson came back to win seven consecutive frames.

=== 2026-27 season ===
In July, he topped his group at the 2026 Championship League. In September, he defeated former world champion John Higgins to reach the quarter-final of the 2026 British Open, equalling his performance from the year before at the competition.

== Personal life ==
Moody paid tribute to his father Nigel who helped him as a young snooker player and “done everything for me, paid for everything, takes me everywhere and looks after me, does the things that people don't see...I'm very grateful.” 2005 World Snooker Championship winner Shaun Murphy has been described as a mentor to Moody. Murphy said he was approached by the Moody family and “I was honoured to be asked [for the mentor role] because but for the guidance of senior pros when I was that young...I might not be here now. There is huge potential there.”

== Performance and rankings timeline ==
Tournament	2021/ 22	2022/ 23	2023/ 24	2024/ 25	2025/ 26	2026/ 27
Ranking (Note: It shows the ranking at the beginning of the season)	(Note: He was an amateur)		(Note: New players on the Main Tour don't have a ranking)	86	64	40
Ranking tournaments
Championship League	A	A	RR	RR	RR	2R
China Open	Tournament Not Held					LQ
Wuhan Open	Not Held		LQ	2R	QF	LQ
British Open	A	A	LQ	3R	QF	QF
English Open	A	A	LQ	LQ	LQ	1R
Shenzhen Open (Note: The event was called the Xi'an Grand Prix (2024/2025–2025/2026))	Not Held			LQ	2R	LQ
Northern Ireland Open	A	A	3R	3R	1R	LQ
International Championship	Not Held		LQ	1R	LQ	1R
UK Championship	A	A	LQ	LQ	LQ	
Shoot Out	2R	A	3R	1R	4R	
Scottish Open	A	A	LQ	1R	1R	
German Masters	A	A	LQ	LQ	LQ	LQ
Welsh Open	A	A	2R	1R	2R	
World Grand Prix	DNQ	DNQ	DNQ	DNQ	DNQ	
Players Championship	DNQ	DNQ	DNQ	DNQ	DNQ	
World Open	Not Held		LQ	2R	2R	
Tour Championship	DNQ	DNQ	DNQ	DNQ	DNQ	
World Championship	A	LQ	LQ	LQ	1R	
Former ranking tournaments
European Masters	A	A	LQ	Not Held		
Saudi Arabia Masters	Not Held			3R	4R	NH
Former non-ranking tournaments
Six-red World Championship	NH	RR	Tournament Not Held			

Performance Table Legend
LQ	lost in the qualifying draw	#R	lost in the early rounds of the tournament (WR = Wildcard round, RR = Round robin)	QF	lost in the quarter-finals
SF	lost in the semi-finals	F	lost in the final	W	won the tournament
DNQ	did not qualify for the tournament	A	did not participate in the tournament	WD	withdrew from the tournament

NH / Not Held	means an event was not held.
NR / Non-Ranking Event	means an event is/was no longer a ranking event.
R / Ranking Event	means an event is/was a ranking event.
MR / Minor-Ranking Event	means an event is/was a minor-ranking event.

== Career finals ==
=== Pro-am finals: 1 (1 title) ===
Outcome	No.	Year	Championship	Opponent in the final	Score
Winner	1.	2026	Pink Ribbon	(England) Mark Joyce	4–2

=== Amateur finals: 2 (1 title) ===
Outcome	No.	Year	Championship	Opponent in the final	Score
Winner	1.	2023	WSF Junior Open	(England) Liam Pullen	5–1
Runner-up	2.	2023	WSF Open	(China) Ma Hailong	0–5
