= 2024 Northern Ireland Open =

Snooker tournament

2024 BetVictor Northern Ireland Open

Tournament information
- Dates: 20–27 October 2024
- Venue: Waterfront Hall
- City: Belfast
- Country: Northern Ireland
- Organisation: World Snooker Tour
- Format: Ranking event
- Total prize fund: £550,400
- Winner's share: £100,000
- Highest break: Mark Williams (WAL) (143); Judd Trump (ENG) (143)

Final
- Champion: Kyren Wilson (ENG)
- Runner-up: Judd Trump (ENG)
- Score: 9–3

The 2024 Northern Ireland Open (officially the 2024 BetVictor Northern Ireland Open) was a professional snooker tournament that took place from 20 to 27 October 2024 at the Waterfront Hall in Belfast, Northern Ireland. It was the seventh ranking event of the 2024‍–‍25 season (following the 2024 Wuhan Open and preceding the 2024 International Championship), the second of four tournaments in the season's Home Nations Series (following the 2024 English Open and preceding the 2024 Scottish Open and the 2025 Welsh Open). The event was broadcast by Eurosport and Discovery+ in Europe and by other broadcasters internationally. The winner received £100,000 from a total prize fund of £550,400 and a place in the 2024 Champion of Champions invitational event.

Judd Trump was the defending champion, having defeated Chris Wakelin 9‍–‍3 in the previous year's final. Trump lost 3‍–‍9 to Kyren Wilson in the final. Wilson claimed his first Northern Ireland Open title and the eighth ranking title of his professional career.

The event produced 60 century breaks, 22 during the qualifying rounds and 38 at the main stage. Trump and Mark Williams both made breaks of 143, the highest of the tournament.

== Format ==
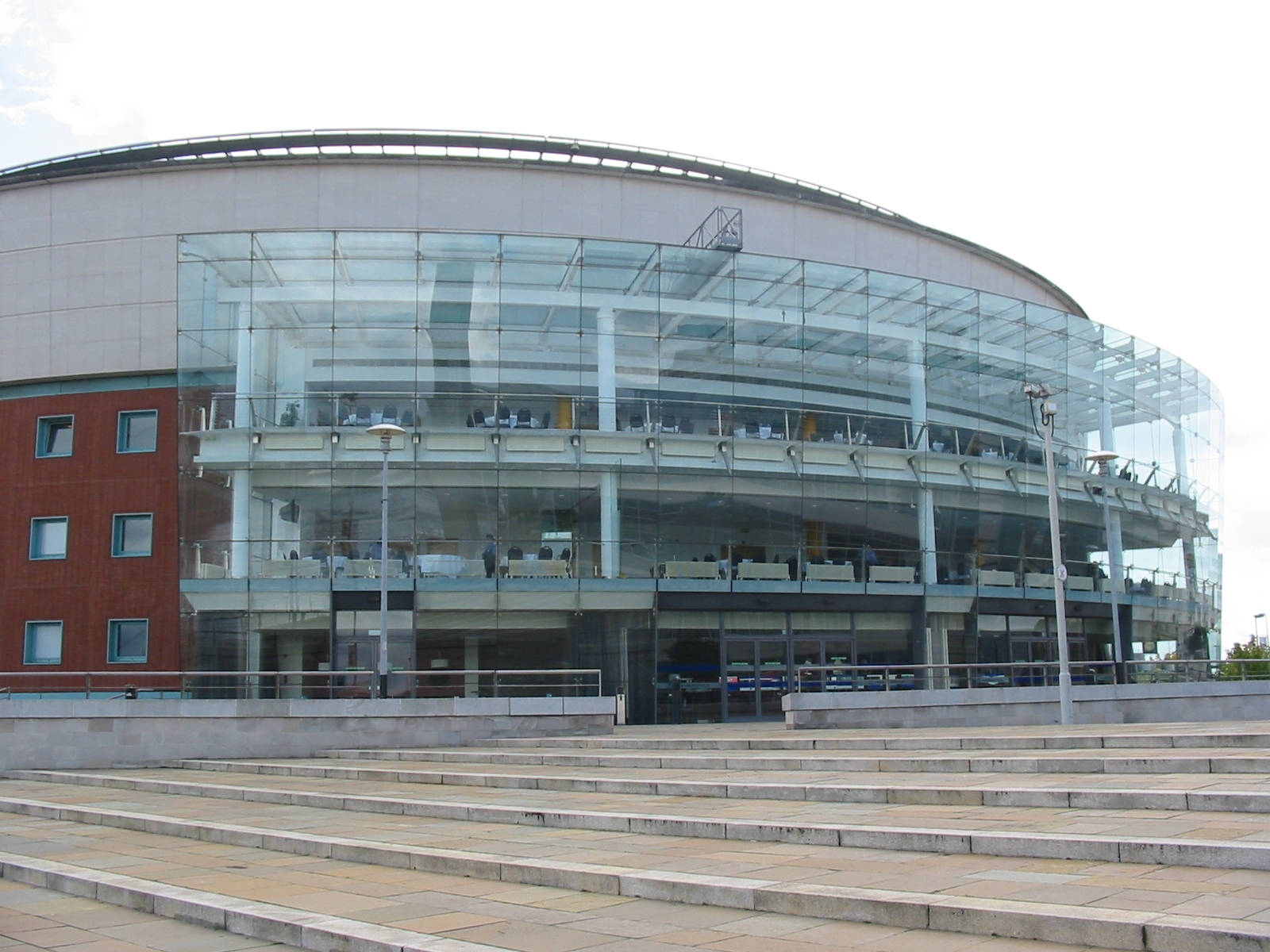
The tournament was held in the Waterfront Hall, Belfast

The event took place from 20 to 27 October 2024 at the Waterfront Hall in Belfast, Northern Ireland. Qualifying took place on 28 and 29 September 2024 at the Ponds Forge International Sports Centre in Sheffield, England.

The WST implemented a new format for the four Home Nations events this season. In qualifying round one, players seeded 65‍–‍96 face those seeded 97‍–‍128. In qualifying round two, the 32 round one winners play those seeded 33‍–‍64. The 32 round two winners then play the top 32 seeds.

All matches were played as the best of 7 frames until the quarter‑finals, which were the best of 9. The semi‑finals were the best of 11, and the final was a best of 17 frame match played over two sessions.

The qualifying rounds were broadcast by Discovery+ in Europe (including the United Kingdom and Ireland) and by the CBSA-WPBSA Academy WeChat Channel, CBSA-WPBSA Academy Douyin and Huya Live in China. They were available from Matchroom Sport in all other territories.

The main stages were broadcast by Eurosport, Discovery+ and DMAX in Europe (including the United Kingdom and Ireland); by the CBSA-WPBSA Academy WeChat Channel, CBSA-WPBSA Academy Douyin and Huya Live in China; by Now TV in Hong Kong; by Astro SuperSport in Malaysia and Brunei; by TrueVision in Thailand; by TAP in the Philippines; and by Sportcast in Taiwan. It was available from Matchroom Sport in all other territories.

=== Prize fund ===
The tournament winner received the Alex Higgins trophy. The breakdown of prize money for the event, an increase of £123,400 from the previous event, is shown below:

- Winner: £100,000
- Runner-up: £45,000
- Semi-final: £21,000
- Quarter-final: £13,200
- Last 16: £9,000
- Last 32: £5,400
- Last 64: £3,600
- Last 96: £1,000
- Highest break: £5,000
- Total: £550,400

== Summary ==
=== Qualifying rounds ===
==== Round 1 ====
The first round took place on 28 September as the best of 7 frames. Oliver Lines played in the semi final of the British Open on 28 September, so his match against Joshua Cooper was held over to the main venue in Belfast, where he beat Cooper 4‍–‍2. Jimmy White beat Paul Deaville 4‍–‍3 and Stan Moody beat Dylan Emery 4‍–‍2. Marco Fu withdrew from the event, so reigning women's world champion Bai Yulu was given a walkover to the next round.

==== Round 2 ====
The second round took place on 29 September as the best of 7 frames. Ricky Walden's match against the winner of the match between Lines and Cooper was held over to the main venue in Belfast, where Lines beat Walden 4‍–‍2.

=== Final rounds ===
==== Last 64 ====
The last 64 matches were played from 20 to 22 October as the best of 7 frames. Ronnie O'Sullivan withdrew from the event, giving opponent Long Zehuang a walkover into the last 32.

In the afternoon session on 20 October Judd Trump whitewashed Ishpreet Singh Chadha, Matthew Selt beat Lyu Haotian 4‍–‍1, and Moody recovered from 0‍–‍2 down to beat Ryan Day 4‍–‍3. In the evening session Louis Heathcote beat 5th seed Mark Selby 4‍–‍3, Shaun Murphy recovered from 0‍–‍2 down to beat Jiang Jun 4‍–‍2, and Mark Davis beat 9th seed Gary Wilson 4‍–‍1. In the afternoon session on 21 October Neil Robertson defeated Graeme Dott 4‍–‍3, Jimmy Robertson beat Xiao Guodong 4‍–‍2, and Martin O'Donnell beat 11th seed Zhang Anda 4‍–‍3. Tian Pengfei defeated 12th seed Si Jiahui 4‍–‍2, and White beat Hossein Vafaei also by 4‍–‍2. In the final frame of the match between White and Vafaei, referee Kevin Dabrowski called an unusual foul on Vafaei when, with ball‑in‑hand, he placed the cue ball slightly outside of the "D". In the evening session Mark Allen whitewashed Liu Hongyu, John Higgins beat Fan Zhengyi 4‍–‍2, and Wang Yuchen defeated Jack Lisowski 4‍–‍3. In the morning session on 22 October Ma Hailong beat 10th seed Ali Carter 4‍–‍1, and Lines beat Wu Yize also by 4‍–‍1. In the afternoon session Chris Wakelin beat Bulcsú Révész 4‍–‍2, and Kyren Wilson beat David Grace 4‍–‍3. Noppon Saengkham beat Thepchaiya Un-Nooh 4‍–‍3 (with Saengkham using Murphy's cue since his own had not arrived at the airport), and Mark Williams whitewashed Jamie Clarke.

==== Last 32 ====
The last 32 matches were played on 22 and 23 October as the best of 7 frames. In the evening session on 22 October Murphy recovered from 0‍–‍2 behind to beat Zhou Yuelong 4‍–‍2, Trump defeated Selt 4‍–‍2, Heathcote beat Jimmy Robertson 4‍–‍1, Tian beat Robert Milkins 4‍–‍1, and Stuart Bingham whitewashed Davis. In the morning session on 23 October Pang Junxu beat 6th seed Luca Brecel 4‍–‍1, and Lei Peifan beat 13th seed Tom Ford also by 4‍–‍1. In the afternoon session Lines beat 3rd seed Allen 4‍–‍3, O'Donnell defeated White 4‍–‍2, and Elliot Slessor beat Long 4‍–‍2. Ma defeated Wakelin 4‍–‍1, and Barry Hawkins beat Higgins 4‍–‍2. In the 23 October evening session Moody whitewashed Jak Jones, Kyren Wilson beat Anthony McGill 4‍–‍3, Neil Robertson whitewashed Wang, and Williams defeated Saengkham 4‍–‍1, making a 143 total clearance in the third frame, the highest break of the tournament, which was later equalled by Trump.

==== Last 16 ====
The last 16 matches were played on 24 October as the best of 7 frames. In the afternoon session Murphy beat Bingham 4‍–‍3, and Pang whitewashed O'Donnell. Williams defeated Ma 4‍–‍2, and Kyren Wilson beat Moody 4‍–‍1. In the evening session Neil Robertson beat Lines and Slessor beat Lei, both by 4‍–‍1. Trump defeated Hawkins 4‍–‍1, and Heathcote beat Tian 4‍–‍2.

==== Quarter finals ====
The quarter-finals were played on 25 October as the best of 9 frames. In the afternoon session Pang beat Neil Robertson 5‍–‍4, making a 129 total clearance in the deciding frame. Kyren Wilson defeated Williams 5‍–‍1, making a 135 break in the 4th frame. In the evening session Trump beat Murphy 5‍–‍1, making breaks of 128 and 125 in the 4th and 5th frames, and Slessor beat Heathcote, also by 5‍–‍1.

==== Semi finals ====
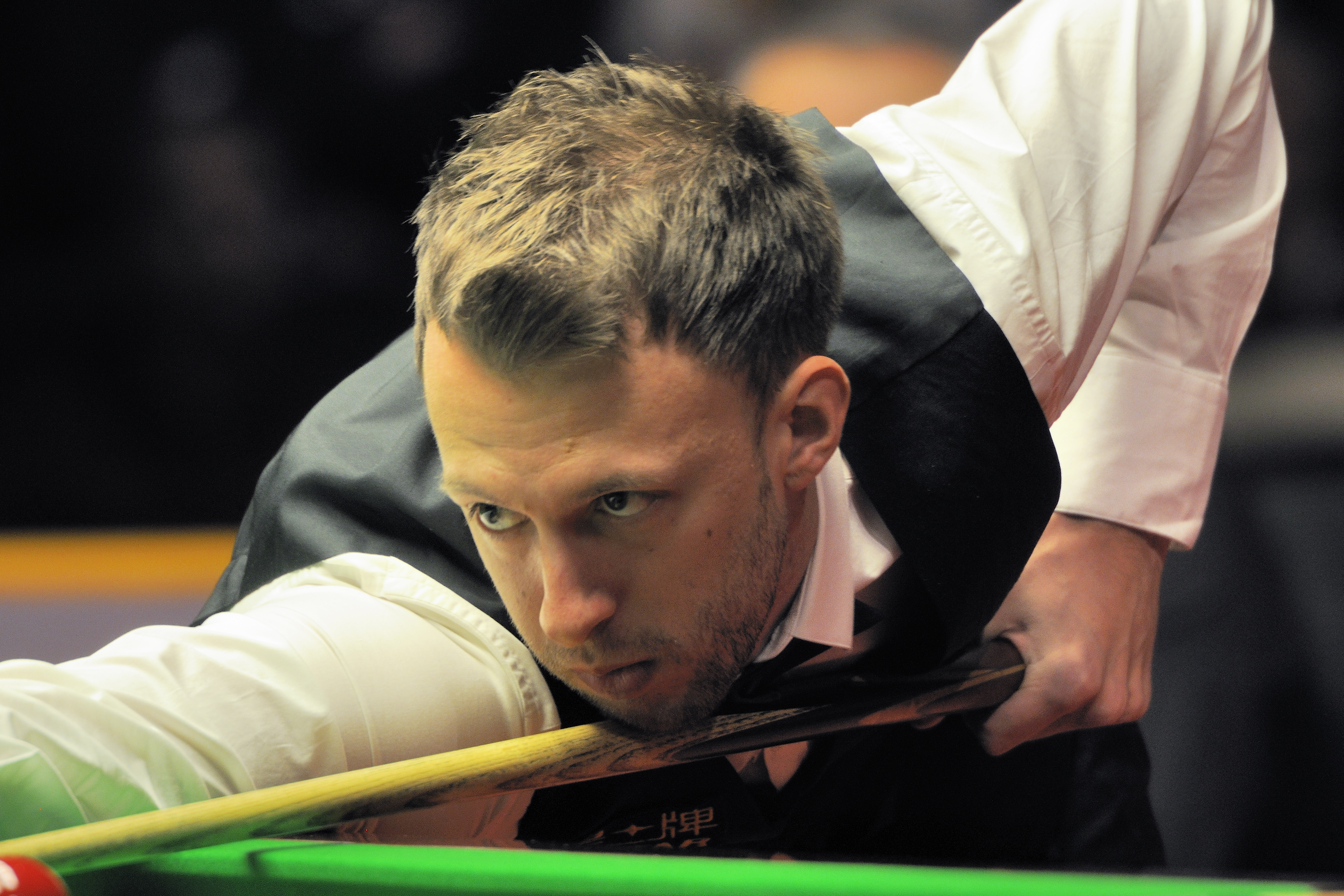
Judd Trump (pictured) whitewashed Elliot Slessor in the semi‑finals

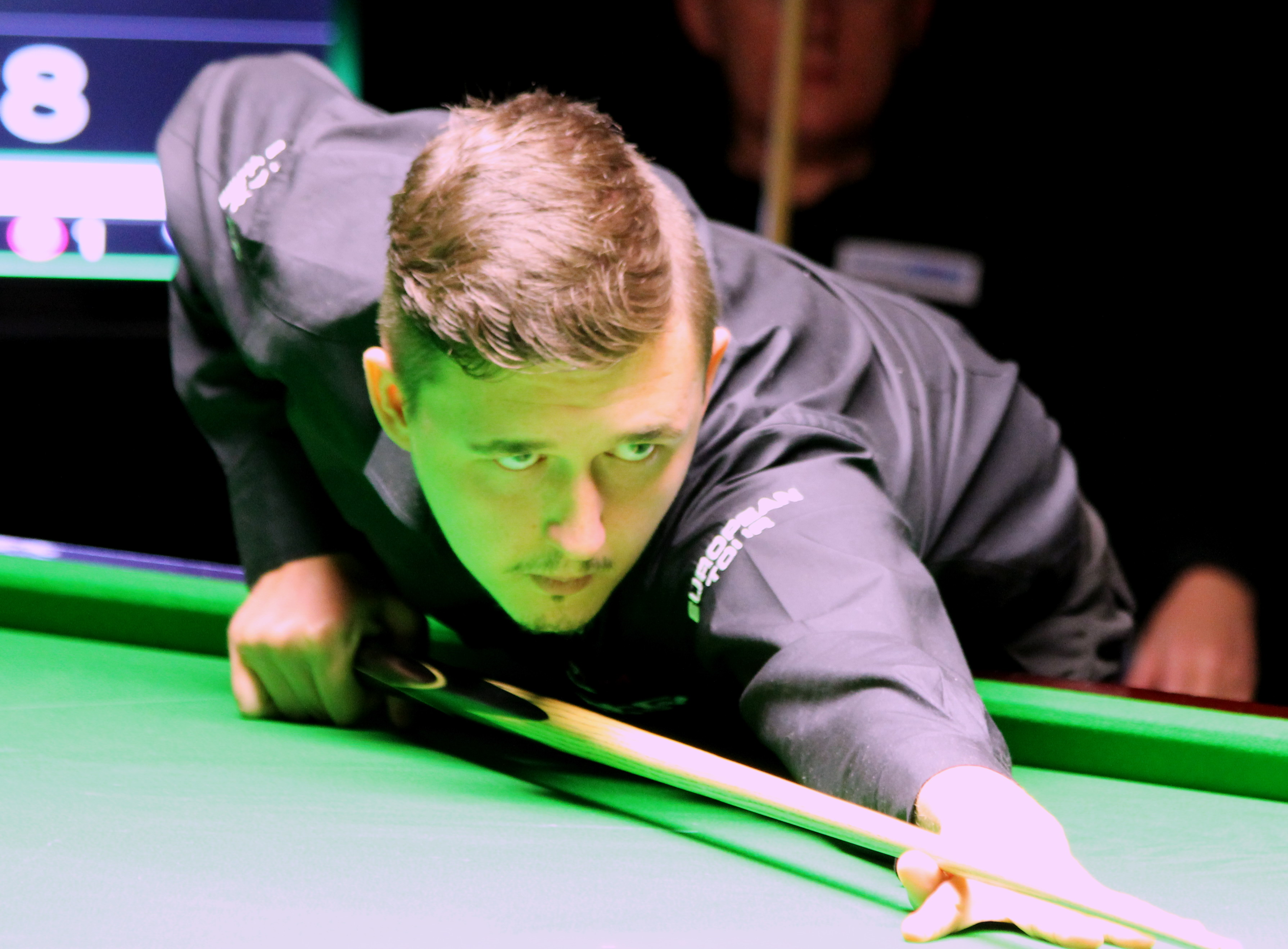
Kyren Wilson (pictured) beat Pang Junxu 6‍–‍4 in the semi‑finals

The semi-finals were played on 26 October as the best of 11 frames. In the afternoon session Kyren Wilson beat Pang 6‍–‍4. After the match Wilson said: "I showed a little bit of emotion at the end, because I've never managed to make the one table setup here at the Waterfront. As soon as I walked out today I thought, wow, what an arena and what a crowd. This is definitely one of the best venues I've ever played in. I was desperate to make the final so I'm delighted to do that." In the evening session Trump whitewashed Slessor. After the match Trump said: "One of the best arenas you can play in, I had plenty left in the tank. I felt very relaxed out there. The table is a good test for everyone. The table conditions play so good here. I love playing here. The table is so reactive."

==== Final ====
The final was played on 27 October as the best of 17 frames, played over two sessions. World number one Trump faced world number two Wilson. At the end of the afternoon session Wilson led Trump 7‍–‍1, having taken the first seven frames. Wilson went on to win the match 9‍–‍3. After the match Wilson said: "We all know Judd [Trump] is capable of reeling frames off in a row. It was about doing the right things. I turned up an hour before this evening's session when nobody would have blamed me for turning up ten minutes before thinking it was won. You can't allow that to happen against Judd." Trump said: "I want to thank everyone for their support tonight. It was always going to be difficult to come back from 7‍–‍1 down, but I got an amazing reception. Kyren [Wilson] was too good today. The way he has bounced back after winning the World Championship is inspiring. I hope we can have many more battles."

== Main draw ==
The results of the main draw are shown below. Numbers in parentheses after the players' names denote the players' seeding and players in bold denote match winners.

=== Top half ===
**Last 64**; Best of 7 frames
**Judd Trump (ENG) (1)**	**4**
Ishpreet Singh Chadha (IND)	0
Lyu Haotian (CHN) (32)	1
**Matthew Selt (ENG)**	**4**
**John Higgins (SCO) (16)**	**4**
Fan Zhengyi (CHN)	2
**Barry Hawkins (ENG) (17)**	**4**
Matthew Stevens (WAL)	2
**Stuart Bingham (ENG) (24)**	**4**
Scott Donaldson (SCO)	1
Gary Wilson (ENG) (9)	1
**Mark Davis (ENG)**	**4**
**Zhou Yuelong (CHN) (25)**	**4**
Dominic Dale (WAL)	3
**Shaun Murphy (ENG) (8)**	**4**
Jiang Jun (CHN)	2
Mark Selby (ENG) (5)	3
**Louis Heathcote (ENG)**	**4**
Xiao Guodong (CHN) (28)	2
**Jimmy Robertson (ENG)**	**4**
Si Jiahui (CHN) (12)	2
**Tian Pengfei (CHN)**	**4**
**Robert Milkins (ENG) (21)**	**4**
Jordan Brown (NIR)	2
David Gilbert (ENG) (20)	2
**Lei Peifan (CHN)**	**4**
**Tom Ford (ENG) (13)**	**4**
Rory Thor (MAS)	2
Joe O'Connor (ENG) (29)	2
**Elliot Slessor (ENG)**	**4**
Ronnie O'Sullivan (ENG) (4) (Note: Ronnie O'Sullivan withdrew and so Long Zehuang was given a walkover to the last 32.)	w/d
**Long Zehuang (CHN)**	**w/o**

**Last 32**; Best of 7 frames
**(England) Judd Trump (1)**	**4**
(England) Matthew Selt	2
(Scotland) John Higgins (16)	2
**(England) Barry Hawkins (17)**	**4**
**(England) Stuart Bingham (24)**	**4**
(England) Mark Davis	0
(China) Zhou Yuelong (25)	2
**(England) Shaun Murphy (8)**	**4**
**(England) Louis Heathcote**	**4**
(England) Jimmy Robertson	1
**(China) Tian Pengfei**	**4**
(England) Robert Milkins (21)	1
**(China) Lei Peifan**	**4**
(England) Tom Ford (13)	1
**(England) Elliot Slessor**	**4**
(China) Long Zehuang	2

**Last 16**; Best of 7 frames
**(England) Judd Trump (1)**	**4**
(England) Barry Hawkins (17)	1
(England) Stuart Bingham (24)	3
**(England) Shaun Murphy (8)**	**4**
**(England) Louis Heathcote**	**4**
(China) Tian Pengfei	2
(China) Lei Peifan	1
**(England) Elliot Slessor**	**4**

**Quarter-finals**; Best of 9 frames
**(England) Judd Trump (1)**	**5**
(England) Shaun Murphy (8)	1
(England) Louis Heathcote	1
**(England) Elliot Slessor**	**5**

**Semi-finals**; Best of 11 frames
**(England) Judd Trump (1)**	**6**
(England) Elliot Slessor	0

Note: w/d=withdrawn; w/o=walkover

=== Bottom half ===
**Last 64**; Best of 7 frames
**Mark Allen (NIR) (3)**	**4**
Liu Hongyu (CHN)	0
Wu Yize (CHN) (30)	1
**Oliver Lines (ENG)**	**4**
**Neil Robertson (AUS) (14)**	**4**
Graeme Dott (SCO)	3
Jack Lisowski (ENG) (19)	3
**Wang Yuchen (HKG)**	**4**
Hossein Vafaei (IRN) (22)	2
**Jimmy White (ENG)**	**4**
Zhang Anda (CHN) (11)	3
**Martin O'Donnell (ENG)**	**4**
**Pang Junxu (CHN) (27)**	**4**
Yuan Sijun (CHN)	3
**Luca Brecel (BEL) (6)**	**4**
He Guoqiang (CHN)	3
**Mark Williams (WAL) (7)**	**4**
Jamie Clarke (WAL)	0
**Noppon Saengkham (THA) (26)**	**4**
Thepchaiya Un-Nooh (THA)	3
Ali Carter (ENG) (10)	1
**Ma Hailong (CHN)**	**4**
**Chris Wakelin (ENG) (23)**	**4**
Bulcsú Révész (HUN)	2
Ryan Day (WAL) (18)	3
**Stan Moody (ENG)**	**4**
**Jak Jones (WAL) (15)**	**4**
Alexander Ursenbacher (SUI)	0
Stephen Maguire (SCO) (31)	1
**Anthony McGill (SCO)**	**4**
**Kyren Wilson (ENG) (2)**	**4**
David Grace (ENG)	3

**Last 32**; Best of 7 frames
(Northern Ireland) Mark Allen (3)	3
**(England) Oliver Lines**	**4**
**(Australia) Neil Robertson (14)**	**4**
(Hong Kong) Wang Yuchen	0
(England) Jimmy White	2
**(England) Martin O'Donnell**	**4**
**(China) Pang Junxu (27)**	**4**
(Belgium) Luca Brecel (6)	1
**(Wales) Mark Williams (7)**	**4**
(Thailand) Noppon Saengkham (26)	1
**(China) Ma Hailong**	**4**
(England) Chris Wakelin (23)	1
**(England) Stan Moody**	**4**
(Wales) Jak Jones (15)	0
(Scotland) Anthony McGill	3
**(England) Kyren Wilson (2)**	**4**

**Last 16**; Best of 7 frames
(England) Oliver Lines	1
**(Australia) Neil Robertson (14)**	**4**
(England) Martin O'Donnell	0
**(China) Pang Junxu (27)**	**4**
**(Wales) Mark Williams (7)**	**4**
(China) Ma Hailong	2
(England) Stan Moody	1
**(England) Kyren Wilson (2)**	**4**

**Quarter-finals**; Best of 9 frames
(Australia) Neil Robertson (14)	4
**(China) Pang Junxu (27)**	**5**
(Wales) Mark Williams (7)	1
**(England) Kyren Wilson (2)**	**5**

**Semi-finals**; Best of 11 frames
(China) Pang Junxu (27)	4
**(England) Kyren Wilson (2)**	**6**

=== Final ===
Final: Best of 17 frames. Referee: Rob Spencer; Waterfront Hall, Belfast, Northern Ireland, 27 October 2024
Judd Trump (1); England	3–**9**	**Kyren Wilson** (2); England
Afternoon: 21–**62**, 56–**57**, 11–**81**, 12–**94**, 1–**75**, 0–**134**, 61–**69**, **83**–1 (Note: The score for frame 5 is given incorrectly as 1–77 by the WST. The actual score was 1–75.); Evening: **84**–4, 41–**73**, **143**–4 (143), 7–**119** (119)
(frame 11) **143**	Highest break	119 (frame 12)
1	Century breaks	1

== Qualifying rounds ==
The results of the early rounds are shown below. Numbers in parentheses after the players' names denote the players' seeding, an "a" indicates amateur players who were not on the main World Snooker Tour, and players in bold denote match winners.

**Round 1 (Last 128)**; Best of 7 frames
**Ishpreet Singh Chadha (IND) (65)**	**4**
Florian Nüßle (AUT) (a)	1
**Michael Holt (ENG) (96)**	**4**
Reanne Evans (ENG) (108)	0
**Liam Pullen (ENG) (80)**	**4**
Mink Nutcharut (THA) (105)	1
**Gong Chenzhi (CHN) (81)**	**4**
Ahmed Aly Elsayed (USA) (112)	0
Artemijs Žižins (LAT) (88)	2
**Duane Jones (WAL) (98)**	**4**
**Alfie Burden (ENG) (73)**	**4**
Mitchell Mann (ENG) (109)	3
Zak Surety (ENG) (89)	3
**Haris Tahir (PAK) (115)**	**4**
**Jiang Jun (CHN) (72)**	**4**
Huang Jiahao (CHN) (107)	3
**Louis Heathcote (ENG) (69)**	**4**
Anton Kazakov (UKR) (a)	3
**Amir Sarkhosh (IRN) (92)**	**4**
Cheung Ka Wai (HKG) (100)	2
Hammad Miah (ENG) (76)	3
**Antoni Kowalski (POL) (99)**	**4**
Dean Young (SCO) (85)	2
**Liam Davies (WAL) (101)**	**4**
**Lei Peifan (CHN) (84)**	**4**
Jamie Gardiner (NIR) (a)	3
**Rory Thor (MAS) (77)**	**4**
Mark Joyce (ENG) (a)	3
Robbie McGuigan (NIR) (93)	3
**Chris Totten (SCO) (104)**	**4**
**Long Zehuang (CHN) (68)**	**4**
Haydon Pinhey (ENG) (102)	3

**Round 2 (Last 96)**; Best of 7 frames
Ashley Carty (ENG) (64)	1
**Ishpreet Singh Chadha (IND) (65)**	**4**
**Matthew Selt (ENG) (33)**	**4**
Michael Holt (ENG) (96)	1
**Fan Zhengyi (CHN) (49)**	**4**
Liam Pullen (ENG) (80)	2
**Matthew Stevens (WAL) (48)**	**4**
Gong Chenzhi (CHN) (81)	1
**Scott Donaldson (SCO) (41)**	**4**
Duane Jones (WAL) (98)	0
**Mark Davis (ENG) (56)**	**4**
Alfie Burden (ENG) (73)	2
**Dominic Dale (WAL) (40)**	**4**
Haris Tahir (PAK) (115)	2
David Lilley (ENG) (57)	3
**Jiang Jun (CHN) (72)**	**4**
Aaron Hill (IRL) (60)	3
**Louis Heathcote (ENG) (69)**	**4**
**Jimmy Robertson (ENG) (37)**	**4**
Amir Sarkhosh (IRN) (92)	0
**Tian Pengfei (CHN) (53)**	**4**
Antoni Kowalski (POL) (99)	0
**Jordan Brown (NIR) (44)**	**4**
Liam Davies (WAL) (101)	1
Jamie Jones (WAL) (45)	3
**Lei Peifan (CHN) (84)**	**4**
Daniel Wells (WAL) (52)	2
**Rory Thor (MAS) (77)**	**4**
**Elliot Slessor (ENG) (36)**	**4**
Chris Totten (SCO) (104)	2
Sanderson Lam (ENG) (61)	0
**Long Zehuang (CHN) (68)**	**4**

**Round 1 (Last 128)**; Best of 7 frames
Stuart Carrington (ENG) (67)	3
**Simon Blackwell (ENG) (a)**	**4**
**Oliver Lines (ENG) (94) (Note: Match held-over to be played in Belfast.)**	**4**
Joshua Cooper (ENG) (a)	2
Andrew Higginson (ENG) (78)	1
**Kreishh Gurbaxani (IND) (113)**	**4**
Andrew Pagett (WAL) (83)	1
**Wang Yuchen (HKG) (111)**	**4**
**Jimmy White (ENG) (86)**	**4**
Paul Deaville (ENG) (a)	3
Ian Burns (ENG) (75)	3
**Joel Connolly (NIR) (a)**	**4**
**Liam Graham (SCO) (91)**	**4**
Baipat Siripaporn (THA) (116)	3
Ross Muir (SCO) (70)	3
**Manasawin Phetmalaikul (THA) (110)**	**4**
**Xing Zihao** (CHN) (71)	**w/o**
Ken Doherty (IRL) (117) (Note: Ken Doherty withdrew and so Xing Zihao was given a walkover.)	w/d
Ben Mertens (BEL) (90)	1
**Daniel Womersley (ENG) (a)**	**4**
**Ma Hailong (CHN) (74)**	**4**
Allan Taylor (ENG) (97)	0
**Bulcsú Révész (HUN) (87)**	**4**
Iulian Boiko (UKR) (a)	3
**Stan Moody (ENG) (82)**	**4**
Dylan Emery (WAL) (a)	2
**Alexander Ursenbacher (SUI) (79)**	**4**
Mostafa Dorgham (EGY) (103)	1
Julien Leclercq (BEL) (95)	3
**Farakh Ajaib (PAK) (106)**	**4**
Marco Fu (HKG) (66) (Note: Marco Fu withdrew and so Bai Yulu was given a walkover.)	w/d
**Bai Yulu** (CHN) (114)	**w/o**

**Round 2 (Last 96)**; Best of 7 frames
**Liu Hongyu (CHN) (62)**	**4**
Simon Blackwell (ENG) (a)	1
Ricky Walden (ENG) (35)	2
**Oliver Lines (ENG) (94)**	**4**
**Graeme Dott (SCO) (51)**	**4**
Kreishh Gurbaxani (IND) (113)	2
Joe Perry (ENG) (46)	2
**Wang Yuchen (HKG) (111)**	**4**
Jackson Page (WAL) (43)	3
**Jimmy White (ENG) (86)**	**4**
**Martin O'Donnell (ENG) (54)**	**4**
Joel Connolly (NIR) (a)	0
**Yuan Sijun (CHN) (38)**	**4**
Liam Graham (SCO) (91)	0
**He Guoqiang (CHN) (59)**	**4**
Manasawin Phetmalaikul (THA) (110)	0
**Jamie Clarke (WAL) (58)**	**4**
Xing Zihao (CHN) (71)	2
**Thepchaiya Un-Nooh (THA) (39)**	**4**
Daniel Womersley (ENG) (a)	0
Anthony Hamilton (ENG) (55)	3
**Ma Hailong (CHN) (74)**	**4**
Robbie Williams (ENG) (42)	0
**Bulcsú Révész (HUN) (87)**	**4**
Ben Woollaston (ENG) (47)	3
**Stan Moody (ENG) (82)**	**4**
Xu Si (CHN) (50)	3
**Alexander Ursenbacher (SUI) (79)**	**4**
**Anthony McGill (SCO) (34)**	**4**
Farakh Ajaib (PAK) (106)	2
**David Grace (ENG) (63)**	**4**
Bai Yulu (CHN) (120)	0

Note: w/d=withdrawn; w/o=walkover

== Century breaks ==
=== Main stage centuries ===
A total of 38 century breaks were made during the main stage of the tournament in Belfast.

- 143, 141, 128, 125, 112, 105 – Judd Trump
- 143 – Mark Williams
- 139 – John Higgins
- 137 – Ma Hailong
- 135, 119, 110 – Kyren Wilson
- 131, 112 – Anthony McGill
- 129, 129, 118 – Pang Junxu
- 121, 101 – Stuart Bingham
- 119 – Long Zehuang
- 118, 104, 103 – Shaun Murphy
- 117 – He Guoqiang
- 115 – Lei Peifan
- 113 – David Gilbert
- 112 – Rory Thor
- 111 – Zhou Yuelong
- 110 – Robert Milkins
- 108, 105, 103 – Stan Moody
- 107, 105, 100 – Neil Robertson
- 103, 103 – Martin O'Donnell
- 103 – Elliot Slessor

=== Qualifying stage centuries ===
A total of 22 century breaks were made during the qualifying stage of the tournament in Sheffield.

- 142 – Yuan Sijun
- 134 – Louis Heathcote
- 133 – Ben Woollaston
- 130 – David Lilley
- 128 – Long Zehuang
- 127 – David Grace
- 117, 114 – Fan Zhengyi
- 113, 109 – Rory Thor
- 113 – Jordan Brown
- 108 – Antoni Kowalski
- 107 – Stuart Carrington
- 105 – Jiang Jun
- 104 – Alfie Burden
- 104 – Liam Davies
- 102 – Duane Jones
- 101 – Lei Peifan
- 101 – Bulcsú Révész
- 101 – Matthew Stevens
- 100 – Wang Yuchen
- 100 – Daniel Womersley
