= Ma Hailong =

Chinese snooker player

Personal information
- Born: 4 September 2003 (age 23) Guilin, Guangxi, China

Sport
- Country: China
- Sport: Snooker
- Professional: 2023–2025
- Highest ranking: 72 (August 2024)
- Best ranking finish: Last 16 (x2)

Ma Hailong
- Simplified Chinese: 马海龙
- Traditional Chinese: 馬海龍
Transcriptions
Standard Mandarin
- Hanyu Pinyin: Mǎ Hǎilóng
Yue: Cantonese
- Yale Romanization: Máh Hói Lùhng
- Jyutping: Maa⁵ Hoi² Lung⁴

Ma Hailong (Chinese: 马海龙; born 4 September 2003) is a Chinese former professional snooker player. In February 2023, he won the 2023 World Snooker Federation Championship, and with it earned a two-year card on the World Snooker Tour.

== Early life ==
At the age of thirteen, Ma Hailong took six months out of school in order to travel the 1000 miles from his home to train at the CBSA World Snooker Academy in Beijing.

== Career ==
In January 2023, at the Guangzhou Snooker Championship, Ma Hailong defeated Jiang Jun in the final to win the championship.

In February 2023 Ma Hailong defeated Stan Moody in the final of the WSF Championship in Sydney, Australia where the win secured him the offer of a two-year card on the World Snooker Tour. On the way to victory in the tournament he defeated Liu Hongyu and former professional Gao Yang. It was his first overseas tournament outside of China. Previously a student at the CBSA Academy branch in Guangdong, after his win it was reported he was planning to move to the United Kingdom to be managed by Bobby Lee and Elite Sports Management.

He entered into the invitational 2023 Six-red World Championship held in Pathum Thani, Thailand in March 2023.

=== 2023/24 ===
He was entered into the draw at the 2023 Championship League held at the Morningside Arena in Leicester, England from 26 June 2023. He went unbeaten in his round-robin stage, earning draws against Mink Nutcharut, John Astley and Gary Wilson. In August 2023, he defeated Ian Burns to qualify for the latter rounds of the 2023 British Open. At the event, held in Cheltenham in September 2023, he reached the last-16 of a ranking event for the first time. At the 2023 Northern Ireland Open he defeated 12th seed Ryan Day in a deciding frame.

In November 2023, he was on the receiving end of a maximum 147 break at the 2023 UK Championship in a 6–1 defeat by compatriot Xu Si. In the first round of qualifying for the 2024 World Snooker Championship he defeated Brazilian Victor Sarkis 10-1. In the second round, he overcame Englishman Martin O'Donnell 10-7.

=== 2024/25 ===
In June 2024, he made a successful start to the 2024-25 snooker season at the 2024 Championship League in Leicester, topping his round-Robin group that contained former world champion John Higgins. He reached the last-16 at the 2024 Northern Ireland Open where he was defeated by Mark Williams. In December 2024 he reached the last-32 of the 2024 Snooker Shoot Out with a win over Lewis Ullah. He reached the last-32 of the 2025 Welsh Open with a win over Shaun Murphy. He was defeated by Duane Jones in the second round of qualifying for the 2025 World Snooker Championship.

Following the conclusion of his two-year tour card he entered the Asia-Oceania Q School in May 2025 but was defeated in the first event by Cambodia's Chhay Suon. Having also entered Asia Oceania Q School in May 2026, he reached the penultimate round of event two, where he was defeated by fellow former professional Huang Jiahao.

== Performance and rankings timeline ==
Tournament	2022/ 23	2023/ 24	2024/ 25
Ranking (Note: Shows the ranking at the beginning of the season)	(Note: He was an amateur)	(Note: New players on the Main Tour don't have a ranking)	77
Ranking tournaments
Championship League	A	RR	2R
Xi'an Grand Prix	Not Held		1R
Saudi Arabia Masters	Not Held		2R
English Open	A	LQ	LQ
British Open	A	3R	1R
Wuhan Open	NH	LQ	LQ
Northern Ireland Open	A	1R	3R
International Championship	NH	LQ	LQ
UK Championship	A	LQ	LQ
Shoot Out	A	1R	3R
Scottish Open	A	LQ	1R
German Masters	A	LQ	LQ
Welsh Open	A	1R	2R
World Open	NH	LQ	LQ
World Grand Prix	DNQ	DNQ	DNQ
Players Championship	DNQ	DNQ	DNQ
Tour Championship	DNQ	DNQ	DNQ
World Championship	LQ	LQ	LQ
Former ranking tournaments
European Masters	A	LQ	NH
Former non-ranking tournaments
Six-red World Championship	RR	Not Held	

Performance Table Legend
LQ	lost in the qualifying draw	#R	lost in the early rounds of the tournament (WR = Wildcard round, RR = Round robin)	QF	lost in the quarter-finals
SF	lost in the semi-finals	F	lost in the final	W	won the tournament
DNQ	did not qualify for the tournament	A	did not participate in the tournament	WD	withdrew from the tournament

NH / Not Held	means an event was not held.
NR / Non-Ranking Event	means an event is/was no longer a ranking event.
R / Ranking Event	means an event is/was a ranking event.
MR / Minor-Ranking Event	means an event is/was a minor-ranking event.
PA / Pro-am Event	means an event is/was a pro-am event.

== Career finals ==
=== Amateur finals: 1 (1 title) ===
Outcome	No.	Year	Championship	Opponent in the final	Score
Winner	1.	2023	WSF Open	(England) Stan Moody	5–0
