= Jiang Jun =

Chinese snooker player

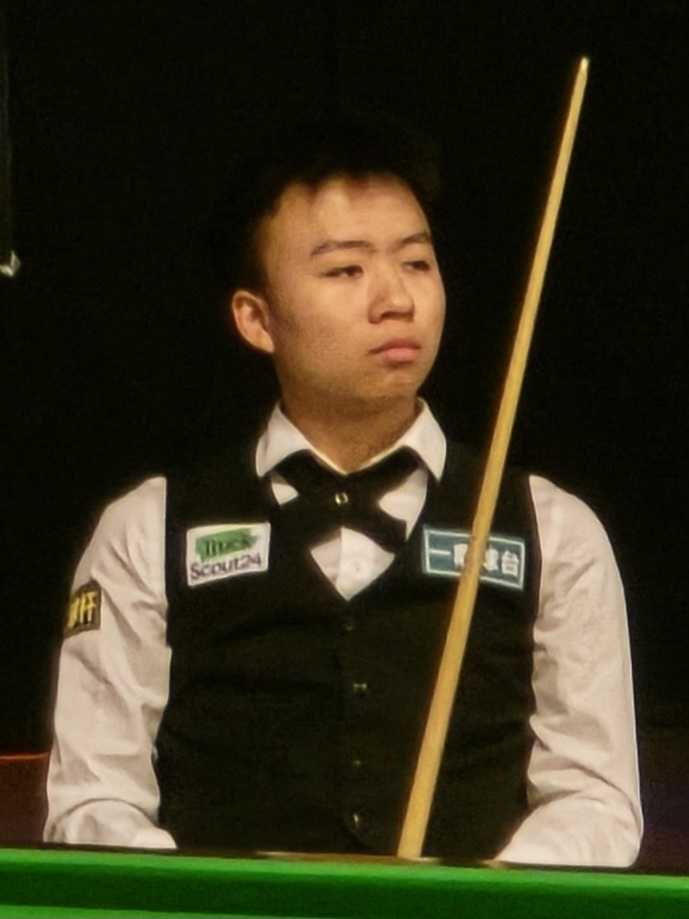
- Jiang in 2025

Personal information
- Born: 28 August 2005 (age 21) Ji'an, Jiangxi, China

Sport
- Country: China
- Sport: Snooker
- Professional: 2023–present
- Highest ranking: 60 (4 October 2026)
- Current ranking: 61 (as of 7 November 2026)
- Best ranking finish: 2 x Quarter-final

Jiang Jun
- Simplified Chinese: 江俊
- Traditional Chinese: 江俊
Transcriptions
Standard Mandarin
- Hanyu Pinyin: Jiāng Jùn
Yue: Cantonese
- Yale Romanization: Gōng Jeun
- Jyutping: Gong¹ Zoen³

Jiang Jun (Chinese: 江俊; born 28 April 2005) is a Chinese professional snooker player. In 2019 he became the IBSF World Under-18 Snooker Champion. In 2023 he earned a two-year card on the World Snooker Tour.

== Career ==
=== Junior career ===
Jiang Jun won the 2019 IBSF World Under-18 Snooker Championship in Pingdu, China. In the final he defeated his compatriot Gao Yang.

=== 2022–23 season ===
In January 2023, at the Guangzhou Snooker Championship, Jiang Jun finished as runner up to champion Ma Hai Long in the final.

In March 2023, Jiang Jun reached the quarter-finals of the 2023 ACBS Asian Snooker Championship in Doha.

In April 2023 he won a two-year card on the World Snooker Tour at the first CBSA qualifying tournament, defeating Chen Feilong, Long Zehuang and Luo Zetao, before beating Liu Hongyu 4–2 in the final.

=== 2023–24 season ===
Jun made his professional debut in a draw at the 2023 Championship League held at the Morningside Arena in Leicester, England from 26 June 2023. Aged seventeen years-old, in his opening match in the round-robin phase he earned a credible 2–2 draw with top-16 ranked Welshman Ryan Day and later recorded his first pro-win, against Himanshu Jain.

During his first season on tour he recorded a few victories over more established professionals. In July 2023 he qualified for the main stages of the European Masters with a 5–1 win over Andrew Pagett. In November 2023, he came from 4–1 down to defeat Jackson Page 6–4 at the 2023 UK Championship.

In the first round of qualifying for the 2024 World Snooker Championship he defeated Iranian Amir Sarkhosh 10–6. In the second round, he edged past compatriot Fan Zhengyi 10–8. He then reached the final qualifying round after a 10–8 victory against Sam Craigie. He was denied a place at the Crucible by Hossein Vafaei who claimed a 10–5 victory.

=== 2024–25 ===
At the 2024 English Open in Brentwood in September 2024 he reached the last 32 with a win over Tom Ford. He reached the last 64 at the 2024 Northern Ireland Open. He made back-to-back centuries to defeat former World Champion Luca Brecel and qualify for the latter stages of the 2024 International Championship. He defeated Andrew Higginson in the second round of qualifying for the 2025 World Snooker Championship.

=== 2025–26 ===
He suffered a narrow 5–4 loss to Joe O'Connor in the first qualifying round for the Wuhan Open in June 2025, his opening match of the 2025–26 season. He was drawn in the round-robin stage of the 2025 Championship League against Pang Junxu, Dean Young and Oliver Lines, and finished second in the group after drawing with Lines and beating Pang. Competing at the 2025 Scottish Open in October 2025, he recorded a 4–0 win over Reanne Evans. The following month, he defeated world number 17 Chris Wakelin 6–2 at the 2025 International Championship, and compatriot He Guoqiang, to reach the last-16 before losing to Stephen Maguire. He reached the quarterfinals at the 2025 Scottish Open with wins over Barry Hawkins, David Gilbert and Thailand's Thepchaiya Un-Nooh. In his first ranking event quarter-final, he was defeated 5–2 by Matthew Selt. In February 2026, he reached another quarter-final as he recorded wins over former world champion Mark Selby, compatriot Yuan Sijun and Robbie Williams at the 2026 Welsh Open. His run was ended in the quarter-final by Wu Yize who came from 4–1 behind to win 5–4.

In the qualifying rounds for the 2026 World Snooker Championship, he defeated Elliot Slessor to set up a final qualifying round match against Stan Moody. Moody won the deciding frame with a break of 104.

=== 2026-27 ===
In June 2026, he reached the main draw at the China Open and also won in qualifying at the 2026 Wuhan Open, to start the season with four wins out of four. In September at the 2026 Shenzhen Open, he recorded a 5-2 win over Ronnie O'Sullivan.

== Personal life ==
During the season, Jiang Jun practices at the Ding Junhui Snooker Academy and lives in Sheffield.

On Chinese social media, he is referred to as The General, or Young General. This is a pun on his Chinese name Jiang Jun (江俊), which sounds similar to the Chinese word for military general (将军, jiāngjūn).

== Performance and rankings timeline ==
Tournament	2023/ 24	2024/ 25	2025/ 26	2026/ 27
Ranking (Note: It shows the ranking at the beginning of the season)	(Note: New players on the Main Tour don't have a ranking)	78	(Note: Players qualified One Year Ranking List started the season without ranking points)	65
Ranking tournaments
Championship League	RR	RR	RR	RR
China Open	Not Held			1R
Wuhan Open	LQ	LQ	LQ	LQ
British Open	LQ	LQ	1R	LQ
English Open	LQ	2R	LQ	LQ
Shenzhen Open (Note: The event was called the Xi'an Grand Prix (2024/2025–2025/2026))	NH	LQ	1R	1R
Northern Ireland Open	1R	1R	LQ	LQ
International Championship	LQ	3R	3R	1R
UK Championship	LQ	LQ	LQ	LQ
Shoot Out	2R	1R	1R	
Scottish Open	LQ	LQ	QF	
German Masters	LQ	1R	LQ	
Welsh Open	LQ	LQ	QF	
World Grand Prix	DNQ	DNQ	DNQ	
Players Championship	DNQ	DNQ	DNQ	
World Open	LQ	LQ	LQ	
Tour Championship	DNQ	DNQ	DNQ	
World Championship	LQ	LQ	LQ	
Former ranking tournaments
European Masters	1R	Not Held		
Saudi Arabia Masters	NH	3R	1R	NH

Performance Table Legend
LQ	lost in the qualifying draw	#R	lost in the early rounds of the tournament (WR = Wildcard round, RR = Round robin)	QF	lost in the quarter-finals
SF	lost in the semi-finals	F	lost in the final	W	won the tournament
DNQ	did not qualify for the tournament	A	did not participate in the tournament	WD	withdrew from the tournament

NH / Not Held	means an event was not held.
NR / Non-Ranking Event	means an event is/was no longer a ranking event.
R / Ranking Event	means an event is/was a ranking event.
MR / Minor-Ranking Event	means an event is/was a minor-ranking event.
