= Liu Hongyu (snooker player) =

Chinese snooker player

Personal information
- Born: 21 April 2004 (age 22) Taishan, Guangdong, China

Sport
- Country: China
- Sport: Snooker
- Professional: 2023–present
- Highest ranking: 52 (August 2026)
- Current ranking: 54 (as of 26 October 2026)
- Best ranking finish: Semi-final (2023 English Open)

Liu Hongyu (Chinese: 刘宏宇; born 21 April 2004) is a Chinese snooker player. He won the APBSF Asia-Pacific Championship on 1 May 2023 to qualify for the World Snooker Tour, on a two-year card, starting from the 2023–24 snooker season.

== Early life ==
Liu is from Taishan in the Guangdong province of China.

== Career ==
In June 2021, at the Chinese national team championship he played as a member of Dongguan Team under coach Jin Di alongside team members Zhao Hanyang and Liang Xiaolong. At the 2022 Q School first event defeated Belgian Ben Mertens which included a break of 137. He also scored centuries in Q school against Alfie Lee, and a 134 against Andy Milliard.

=== 2022–23 season ===
In February 2023 he lost in the quarter finals to eventual winner Ma Hailong at the WSF Championship in Sydney, Australia. During the tournament he had impressed with his high scoring, including breaks of 138 and 133.

In April 2023 Liu lost in the final of the first CBSA World Snooker Tour qualifying tournament to Jiang Jun. The following month he won the Asia-Pacific Championship with a 6-1 win in the final against Yuchen Wang to be the APBSF Asia Pacific qualifier on to the World Snooker Tour for the 2023-24 snooker season, on a two-year card.

=== 2023–24 season ===
He started the 2023-24 season with the 2023 Championship League held at the Morningside Arena in Leicester, England from 26 June 2023. With victories over Ricky Walden, David Lilley and Peng Yisong, Liu topped his group at the Championship League on his tour debut. In the second stage round-robin, he lost to Noppon Saengkham before beating Ashley Carty and drawing with Daniel Wells to finish as runner-up in the group to Saengkham. He earned another professional win on 17 August 2023, at the British Open qualifying in Leicester, with a 4-1 win over Baipat Siripaporn. He qualified for the 2023 European Masters, held in Germany, but had to pull out of the event when an issue with his visa prevented his travel.

In October 2023, at the English Open, he came from 3-1 down to defeat former World Champion Shaun Murphy 4-3. He followed this up with credible wins over ranking event finalist Joe O'Connor and former snooker shoot-out winner Chris Wakelin before defeating another former world champion Mark Williams to reach his first ranking event quarter-final. He then triumphed over compatriot Ding Junhui to reach his first ranking semi-final, before losing to Zhang Anda by 2-6. In December 2023, he recorded a second win of the season over Shaun Murphy, winning 4-1 at the Scottish Open. He qualified for the 2024 German Masters in Berlin with a 5-0 whitewash over the experienced Dominic Dale.

In the qualifying round of the 2024 World Snooker Championship he defeated Jimmy White 10-3.

=== 2024-25 season ===
He reached the fourth round of the 2024 Saudi Arabia Snooker Masters with a 4-1 win over Ricky Walden. At the 2024 English Open in Brentwood in September 2024 he reached the last 64 where he was defeated on a deciding frame by Judd Trump. He reached the last-64 at the 2024 Northern Ireland Open.

=== 2025-26 season ===
He started the 2025-26 season in June 2025 in the qualifying round for the Wuhan Open with a creditable win over established professional Ian Burns. That month, he recorded a 4-0 whitewash win over Ng On-yee in British Open qualifying. He then topped his group in the round-robin stage of the 2025 Championship League against Ian Burns, Patrick Whelan and Noppon Saengkham. He reached the last-64 at the 2025 Wuhan Open where he lost to world number one Judd Trump. At the 2025 International Championship in Nanjing he lost a close match 6-5 against former world champion Mark Selby in the last-64. He also lost on a deciding frame against Shaun Murphy in the last-64 at the 2025 Scottish Open.

=== 2026-27 season ===
In June 2026, he reached the main draw at the China Open and also beat Phil O'Kane to set up a match against former World Champion John Higgins at the 2026 Wuhan Open, to start the season with four wins out of four. In July, he topped his group at the 2026 Championship League with two wins and a draw.

== Performance and rankings timeline ==
Tournament	2023/ 24	2024/ 25	2025/ 26	2026/ 27
Ranking (Note: It shows the ranking at the beginning of the season)	(Note: New players on the Main Tour don't have a ranking)	67	56	58
Ranking tournaments
Championship League	2R	RR	2R	2R
China Open	Not Held			2R
Wuhan Open	LQ	LQ	1R	1R
British Open	1R	LQ	1R	LQ
English Open	SF	1R	1R	LQ
Shenzhen Open (Note: The event was called the Xi'an Grand Prix (2024/2025–2025/2026))	NH	LQ	LQ	LQ
Northern Ireland Open	LQ	1R	LQ	LQ
International Championship	LQ	1R	1R	2R
UK Championship	LQ	LQ	LQ	
Shoot Out	1R	1R	2R	
Scottish Open	2R	LQ	1R	
German Masters	1R	1R	LQ	
Welsh Open	LQ	LQ	1R	
World Grand Prix	DNQ	DNQ	DNQ	
Players Championship	DNQ	DNQ	DNQ	
World Open	1R	3R	LQ	
Tour Championship	DNQ	DNQ	DNQ	
World Championship	LQ	LQ	LQ	
Former ranking tournaments
European Masters	WD	Not Held		
Saudi Arabia Masters	NH	5R	3R	NH

Performance Table Legend
LQ	lost in the qualifying draw	#R	lost in the early rounds of the tournament (WR = Wildcard round, RR = Round robin)	QF	lost in the quarter-finals
SF	lost in the semi-finals	F	lost in the final	W	won the tournament
DNQ	did not qualify for the tournament	A	did not participate in the tournament	WD	withdrew from the tournament

NH / Not Held	means an event was not held.
NR / Non-Ranking Event	means an event is/was no longer a ranking event.
R / Ranking Event	means an event is/was a ranking event.
MR / Minor-Ranking Event	means an event is/was a minor-ranking event.
