= Pang Junxu =

Chinese snooker player (born 2000)

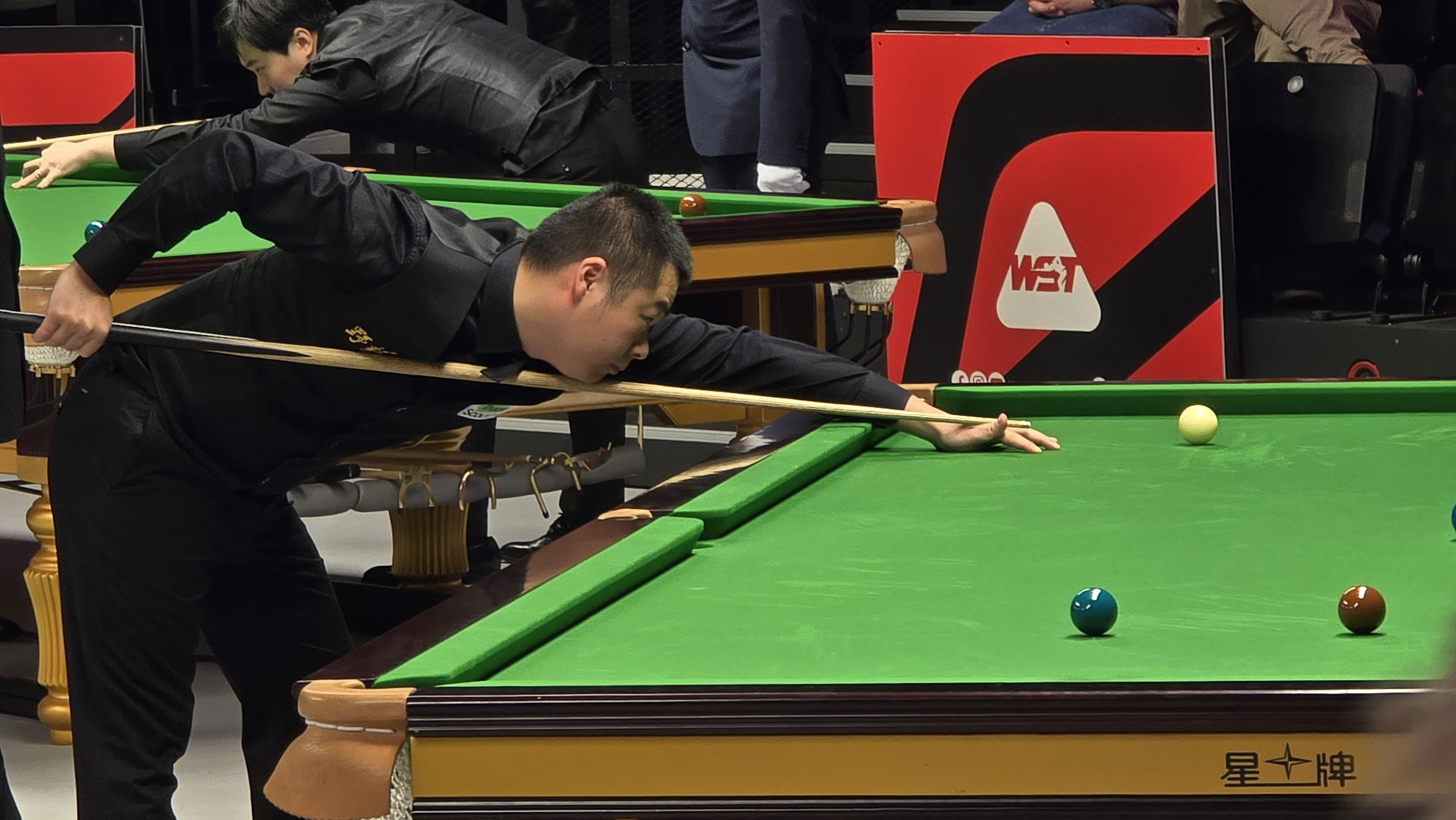
- Pang Junxu at German Masters 2025

Personal information
- Born: 15 February 2000 (age 26) Bozhou, Anhui, China

Sport
- Country: China
- Sport: Snooker
- Professional: 2020–present
- Highest ranking: 25 (May 2026)
- Current ranking: 29 (as of 7 November 2026)
- Century breaks: 104 (as of 18 November 2026)
- Best ranking finish: Runner-up (2023 WST Classic)

Pang Junxu
- Simplified Chinese: 庞俊旭
- Traditional Chinese: 龐俊旭
Transcriptions
Standard Mandarin
- Hanyu Pinyin: Páng Jùnxù
Yue: Cantonese
- Yale Romanization: Pòhng Jeun Yūk
- Jyutping: Pong⁴ Zeon³ Juk¹

Pang Junxu (Chinese: 庞俊旭; born 15 February 2000) is a Chinese professional snooker player. He was awarded the "Rookie of the Year" Award in 2021.

== Career ==
As a result of Pang's performances on the CBSA Tour, he was awarded a two-year card on the World Snooker Tour for the 2020–21 and 2021–22 seasons.

== Performance and rankings timeline ==
Tournament	2016/ 17	2017/ 18	2018/ 19	2019/ 20	2020/ 21	2021/ 22	2022/ 23	2023/ 24	2024/ 25	2025/ 26	2026/ 27
Ranking (Note: It shows the ranking at the beginning of the season)	(Note: He was an amateur)				(Note: New players on the Main Tour don't have a ranking)	66	53	33	27	26	25
Ranking tournaments
Championship League	Non-Ranking Event				RR	RR	3R	2R	RR	3R	2R
China Open	A	A	1R	Tournament Not Held							1R
Wuhan Open	Tournament Not Held							2R	2R	1R	2R
British Open	Tournament Not Held					3R	LQ	LQ	LQ	LQ	2R
English Open	A	A	A	A	1R	LQ	2R	LQ	3R	2R	3R
Shenzhen Open (Note: The event was called the Xi'an Grand Prix (2024/2025–2025/2026))	Tournament Not Held								2R	LQ	1R
Northern Ireland Open	A	A	A	A	1R	LQ	2R	LQ	SF	2R	3R
International Championship	A	A	A	LQ	Not Held			3R	3R	1R	2R
UK Championship	A	A	A	A	4R	1R	LQ	1R	LQ	QF	
Shoot Out	A	A	A	A	WD	1R	1R	1R	1R	3R	
Scottish Open	A	A	A	A	1R	2R	1R	2R	1R	2R	
German Masters	A	A	A	A	1R	LQ	QF	2R	1R	1R	LQ
Welsh Open	A	A	A	A	4R	LQ	SF	LQ	3R	2R	
World Grand Prix	DNQ	DNQ	DNQ	DNQ	DNQ	DNQ	DNQ	1R	1R	2R	
Players Championship	DNQ	DNQ	DNQ	DNQ	DNQ	DNQ	DNQ	DNQ	DNQ	DNQ	
World Open	A	A	A	A	Not Held			1R	QF	LQ	
Tour Championship	Not Held		DNQ	DNQ	DNQ	DNQ	DNQ	DNQ	DNQ	DNQ	
World Championship	A	A	LQ	A	LQ	LQ	1R	1R	2R	1R	
Non-ranking tournaments
Shanghai Masters	Ranking		A	A	Not Held			1R	QF	1R	1R
Championship League	A	A	A	A	A	A	A	RR	RR	RR	
Former ranking tournaments
China Championship	NR	A	A	LQ	Tournament Not Held						
WST Pro Series	Tournament Not Held				RR	Tournament Not Held					
Turkish Masters	Tournament Not Held					LQ	Tournament Not Held				
Gibraltar Open	A	A	A	A	3R	WD	Tournament Not Held				
WST Classic	Tournament Not Held						F	Tournament Not Held			
European Masters	A	A	A	A	4R	3R	LQ	1R	Not Held		
Saudi Arabia Masters	Tournament Not Held								6R	4R	NH
Former non-ranking tournaments
Six-red World Championship	A	A	A	A	Not Held		LQ	Tournament Not Held			
Haining Open	3R	2R	3R	4R	NH	A	A	Tournament Not Held			

Performance Table Legend
LQ	lost in the qualifying draw	#R	lost in the early rounds of the tournament (WR = Wildcard round, RR = Round robin)	QF	lost in the quarter-finals
SF	lost in the semi-finals	F	lost in the final	W	won the tournament
DNQ	did not qualify for the tournament	A	did not participate in the tournament	WD	withdrew from the tournament

NH / Not Held	means an event was not held.
NR / Non-Ranking Event	means an event is/was no longer a ranking event.
R / Ranking Event	means an event is/was a ranking event.
MR / Minor-Ranking Event	means an event is/was a minor-ranking event.

== Career finals ==
=== Ranking finals: 1 ===
Outcome	No.	Year	Championship	Opponent in the final	Score
Runner-up	1.	2023	WST Classic	(England) Mark Selby	2–6

=== Pro-am finals: 1 ===
Outcome	No.	Year	Championship	Opponent in the final	Score
Runner-up	1.	2019	Huizhou Open	(China) Yuan Sijun	2–5

=== Amateur finals: 1 ===
Outcome	No.	Year	Championship	Opponent in the final	Score
Runner-up	1.	2019	IBSF World Under-21 Snooker Championship	(China) Zhao Jianbo	1–6
