= Shenzhen Open (snooker) =

Snooker ranking tournament in Shenzhen, China

Tournament information
- Venue: Bao'an Sports Centre
- Location: Shenzhen
- Country: China
- Established: 2024
- Organisation(s): World Snooker Tour; CBSA
- Format: Ranking event
- Total prize fund: £850,000
- Winner's share: £177,000
- Recent edition: 2026
- Current champion: Wu Yize (CHN)

The Shenzhen Open is a professional snooker ranking tournament held in Shenzhen, China. Organised by the World Snooker Tour, the tournament was first held as the Xi'an Grand Prix in August 2024. The reigning champion is Wu Yize.

== History ==
The event was called Xi'an Grand Prix before the relocation to Shenzhen.

In February 2024, the World Snooker Tour announced the addition of the Xi'an Grand Prix ranking tournament to the calendar, beginning in the 2024–25 season. The tournament offers one of the highest prizes for ranking tournaments in China, with the winner receiving £177,000 from a total prize fund of £850,000. Kyren Wilson won the inaugural 2024 edition, held from 19 to 25 August 2024.

In June 2026, the World Snooker Tour announced the event will be moving from Xi'an in Shaanxi Province to Shenzhen in Guangdong Province.

== Winners ==
Year	Winner	Runner-up	Final score	Venue	City	Season
Xi'an Grand Prix
2024	Kyren Wilson (ENG)	Judd Trump (ENG)	10–8	Qujiang Sports Complex	Xi'an	2024/25
2025	Mark Williams (WAL)	Shaun Murphy (ENG)	10–3	Qujiang Sports Complex	Xi'an	2025/26
Shenzhen Open
2026	Wu Yize (CHN)	Yuan Sijun (CHN)	10–5	Bao'an Sports Centre	Shenzhen	2026/27

== Finalists ==
Name	Nationality	Winner	Runner-up	Finals
Kyren Wilson	England	1	0	1
Mark Williams	Wales	1	0	1
Wu Yize	China	1	0	1
Judd Trump	England	0	1	1
Shaun Murphy	England	0	1	1
Yuan Sijun	China	0	1	1

Legend
The names of active players are marked in **bold**.

== Records ==
Mark Williams won the 2025 edition at the age of 50 years and 206 days, breaking the record set by Ray Reardon 43 years earlier as the oldest ever winner of a professional ranking tournament.

== See also ==
- World Grand Prix (snooker), another ranking event held in nearby Hong Kong
- 2000 China Open
- Dongguan Open
