= 2024 English Open (snooker) =

Snooker tournament

2024 BetVictor English Open

Tournament information
- Dates: 12–22 September 2024
- Venue: Brentwood Centre
- City: Brentwood
- Country: England
- Organisation: World Snooker Tour
- Format: Ranking event
- Total prize fund: £550,400
- Winner's share: £100,000
- Highest break: Fan Zhengyi (CHN) (147)

Final
- Champion: Neil Robertson (AUS)
- Runner-up: Wu Yize (CHN)
- Score: 9–7

The 2024 English Open (officially the 2024 BetVictor English Open) was a professional snooker tournament that took place from 12 to 22 September 2024 at the Brentwood Centre in Brentwood, England. It was the fourth ranking event of the 2024‍–‍25 season (following the 2024 Saudi Arabia Snooker Masters and preceding the 2024 British Open) and the first of four tournaments in the season's Home Nations Series (preceding the 2024 Northern Ireland Open, the 2024 Scottish Open, and the 2025 Welsh Open). The event was broadcast by Eurosport and Discovery+ in Europe (including the United Kingdom and Ireland) and by other broadcasters internationally. The winner received £100,000 from a total prize fund of £550,400, the Steve Davis trophy, and a place in the 2024 Champion of Champions invitational event.

Judd Trump was the defending champion, having defeated Zhang Anda 9‍–‍7 in the 2023 final, but he lost 3‍–‍5 in the quarter‑finals to Wu Yize, who went on to reach his maiden ranking final. Neil Robertson defeated Wu 9‍–‍7 to win his second English Open title (following his previous win at the 2021 event) and the 24th ranking title of his career. It was Robertson's first victory at a ranking event since the 2022 Tour Championship, and he re‑entered the top 16 in the world rankings after the tournament. John Higgins fell to 17th in the rankings, ending his record uninterrupted tenure of over 29 years inside the top 16.

The event produced 69 century breaks, with 23 in the qualifying rounds and 46 in the later rounds, the highest being a maximum break by Fan Zhengyi in his second round qualifying match against Liam Pullen. Higgins made his 1,000th century break in professional competition in his last‑16 match against Mark Allen, becoming the second player to reach that milestone, after Ronnie O'Sullivan.

== Format ==
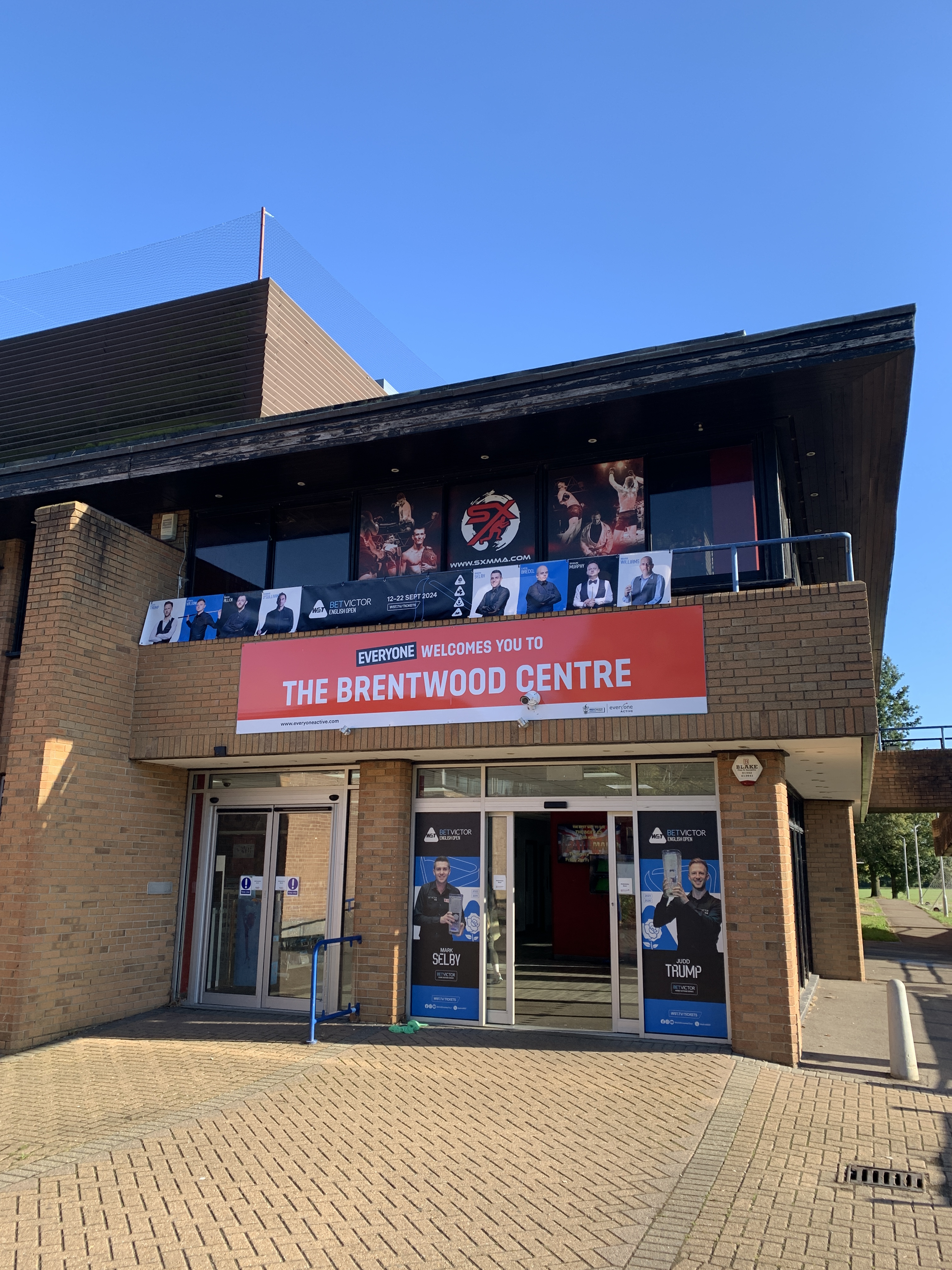
The tournament took place at The Brentwood Centre

The event took place from 12 to 22 September 2024 at the Brentwood Centre in Brentwood, England.

The WST implemented a new format for the four Home Nations events this season. In qualifying round one, players seeded 65‍–‍96 face those seeded 97‍–‍128. In qualifying round two, the 32 round one winners play those seeded 33‍–‍64. The 32 round two winners then play the top 32 seeds. Both the qualifying rounds and the final rounds were played at the same venue, in Brentwood, with a day off after the end of the qualifying matches.

All matches were played as best of seven frames until the quarter‑finals, which were best of nine. The semi‑finals were best of 11, and the final was a best‑of‑17 frame match played over two sessions.

The event was broadcast by Eurosport, Discovery+ and DMAX in Europe (including the United Kingdom and Ireland); by the CBSA-WPBSA Academy WeChat Channel, CBSA-WPBSA Academy Douyin and Huya Live in China; by Now TV in Hong Kong; by Astro SuperSport in Malaysia and Brunei; by TrueVision in Thailand; by TAP in the Philippines; and by Sportcast in Taiwan. It was available from Matchroom Sport in all other territories.

=== Prize fund ===
The tournament winner received the Steve Davis trophy. The breakdown of prize money for the event, an increase of £123,400 from the previous event, is shown below:

- Winner: £100,000
- Runner-up: £45,000
- Semi-final: £21,000
- Quarter-final: £13,200
- Last 16: £9,000
- Last 32: £5,400
- Last 64: £3,600
- Last 96: £1,000
- Highest break: £5,000
- Total: £550,400

== Summary ==
=== Qualifying rounds ===
==== Round 1 ====
The first round took place from 12 to 13 September as the best of 7 frames. On the first day of the tournament, Zak Surety beat Farakh Ajaib 4‍–‍2 with a high break of 77, and Oliver Lines defeated Rory Thor 4‍–‍3. Liam Pullen whitewashed first‑year tour player Antoni Kowalski, and fellow rookie Artemijs Žižins defeated Duane Jones 4‍–‍2. Mink Nutcharut faced Reanne Evans, the first time a match on the professional tour had taken place between two women, other than in matches played in mixed doubles tournaments. Nutcharut defeated Evans 4‍–‍2.

==== Round 2 ====
The second round took place on 13, 14 and 16 September as the best of 7 frames. Fan Zhengyi made the first maximum break of his career in the final frame of his 4‍–‍2 win over Liam Pullen. Zak Surety defeated Elliot Slessor 4‍–‍1, and Aaron Hill beat Lei Peifan 4‍–‍2. Artemijs Žižins beat Robbie Williams, Andrew Pagett beat Jordan Brown, and Ishpreet Singh Chadha beat Graeme Dott, all by the same score of 4‍–‍2. David Grace whitewashed Marco Fu, and Thepchaiya Un-Nooh beat Oliver Sykes 4‍–‍1. Bulcsú Révész beat Yuan Sijun 4‍–‍2, and Ricky Walden whitewashed Mink Nutcharut.

=== Final rounds ===
==== Last 64 ====
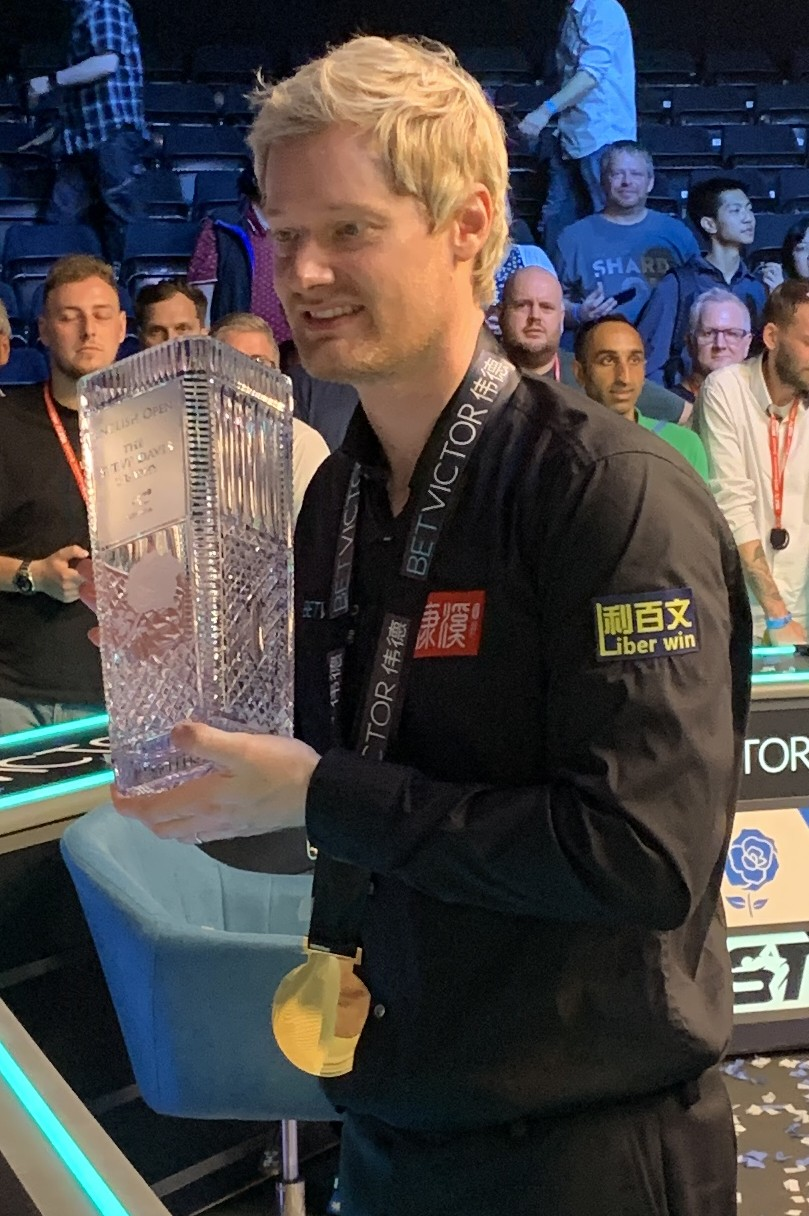
Neil Robertson with the Steve Davis trophy

The last 64 matches took place on 16 and 17 September as the best of 7 frames. Ali Carter whitewashed Ian Burns. Judd Trump defeated Liu Hongyu 4‍–‍3, and Zak Surety whitewashed Noppon Saengkham. Ben Woollaston beat Mark Williams 4‍–‍1, and Mark Allen defeated Long Zehuang 4‍–‍3. He Guoqiang defeated Ronnie O'Sullivan 4‍–‍2, and John Higgins beat Andrew Higginson 4‍–‍1.

==== Last 32 ====
The last 32 matches took place on 18 September as the best of 7 frames. John Higgins beat David Gilbert 4‍–‍1, Kyren Wilson defeated Anthony McGill 4‍–‍1, and Judd Trump beat Matthew Selt also by 4‍–‍1. Neil Robertson beat Shaun Murphy 4‍–‍1, Mark Allen defeated Lyu Haotian 4‍–‍2, He Guoqiang beat Stephen Maguire 4‍–‍1, and Ishpreet Singh Chadha beat Hossein Vafaei 4‍–‍2.

==== Last 16 ====
The last 16 matches took place on 19 September as the best of 7 frames. Ishpreet Singh Chadha beat He Guoqiang 4‍–‍3, Mark Selby defeated Si Jiahui 4‍–‍3, Judd Trump beat Fan Zhengyi 4‍–‍2, and Wu Yize beat Ben Woollaston 4‍–‍2. In the evening session John Higgins made his 1,000th career century break in the match against Mark Allen. Allen went on to win the match 4‍–‍3. Neil Robertson beat Ross Muir 4‍–‍1, Chris Wakelin beat Pang Junxu 4‍–‍3, and Barry Hawkins defeated Kyren Wilson 4‍–‍2.

==== Quarter finals ====
The quarter-finals took place on 20 September as the best of 9 frames. In the afternoon session Judd Trump played Wu Yize, and Mark Allen played Chris Wakelin. In the evening session Mark Selby played Ishpreet Singh Chadha and Neil Robertson played Barry Hawkins. Wu defeated Trump 5‍–‍3, and Wakelin beat Allen 5‍–‍2. Robertson beat Hawkins 5‍–‍1, and Chadha defeated Selby 5‍–‍4.

==== Semi finals ====
The semi-finals took place on 21 September as the best of 11 frames. In the afternoon session Wu Yize played Ishpreet Singh Chadha. In the evening session Chris Wakelin played Neil Robertson. Wu whitewashed Chadha, and Robertson beat Wakelin 6‍–‍1.

==== Final ====
The final took place on 22 September as the best of 17 frames, played over two sessions between Wu Yize and Neil Robertson. At the end of the afternoon session Robertson led Wu 7‍–‍1. Robertson went on to win the match 9‍–‍7.

== Final rounds ==
The draw for the final rounds is shown below. Numbers in parentheses after the players' names denote the players' seeding, and players in bold denote match winners.

=== Top half ===
**Last 64**; Best of 7 frames
**Judd Trump (ENG) (1)**	**4**
Liu Hongyu (CHN)	3
**Matthew Selt (ENG) (32)**	**4**
Ricky Walden (ENG)	3
Ryan Day (WAL) (16)	1
**Fan Zhengyi (CHN)**	**4**
Robert Milkins (ENG) (17)	3
**Oliver Lines (ENG)**	**4**
Stuart Bingham (ENG) (24)	3
**Wu Yize (CHN)**	**4**
**Ali Carter (ENG) (9)**	**4**
Ian Burns (ENG)	0
Noppon Saengkham (THA) (25)	0
**Zak Surety (ENG)**	**4**
Mark Williams (WAL) (8)	1
**Ben Woollaston (ENG)**	**4**
**Mark Selby (ENG) (5)**	**4**
Aaron Hill (IRL)	2
**Joe O'Connor (ENG) (28)**	**4**
Artemijs Žižins (LAT)	0
Tom Ford (ENG) (12)	2
**Jiang Jun (CHN)**	**4**
**Si Jiahui (CHN) (21)**	**4**
Andrew Pagett (WAL)	1
**Hossein Vafaei (IRN) (20)**	**4**
Matthew Stevens (WAL)	3
Jak Jones (WAL) (13)	3
**Ishpreet Chadha (IND)**	**4**
**Stephen Maguire (SCO) (29)**	**4**
Bulcsú Révész (HUN)	0
Ronnie O'Sullivan (ENG) (4)	2
**He Guoqiang (CHN)**	**4**

**Last 32**; Best of 7 frames
**(England) Judd Trump (1)**	**4**
(England) Matthew Selt (32)	1
**(China) Fan Zhengyi**	**4**
(England) Oliver Lines	2
**(China) Wu Yize**	**4**
(England) Ali Carter (9)	2
(England) Zak Surety	1
**(England) Ben Woollaston**	**4**
**(England) Mark Selby (5)**	**4**
(England) Joe O'Connor (28)	0
(China) Jiang Jun	3
**(China) Si Jiahui (21)**	**4**
(Iran) Hossein Vafaei (20)	2
**(India) Ishpreet Chadha**	**4**
(Scotland) Stephen Maguire (29)	1
**(China) He Guoqiang**	**4**

**Last 16**; Best of 7 frames
**(England) Judd Trump (1)**	**4**
(China) Fan Zhengyi	2
**(China) Wu Yize**	**4**
(England) Ben Woollaston	2
**(England) Mark Selby (5)**	**4**
(China) Si Jiahui (21)	3
**(India) Ishpreet Chadha**	**4**
(China) He Guoqiang	3

**Quarter-finals**; Best of 9 frames
(England) Judd Trump (1)	3
**(China) Wu Yize**	**5**
(England) Mark Selby (5)	4
**(India) Ishpreet Chadha**	**5**

**Semi-finals**; Best of 11 frames
**(China) Wu Yize**	**6**
(India) Ishpreet Chadha	0

=== Bottom half ===
**Last 64**; Best of 7 frames
**Mark Allen (NIR) (3)**	**4**
Long Zehuang (CHN)	3
**Lyu Haotian (CHN) (30)**	**4**
Dominic Dale (WAL)	2
**John Higgins (SCO) (14)**	**4**
Andrew Higginson (ENG)	1
**David Gilbert (ENG) (19)**	**4**
Michael Holt (ENG)	3
**Chris Wakelin (ENG) (22)**	**4**
Joe Perry (ENG)	2
**Zhang Anda (CHN) (11)**	**4**
Mark Davis (ENG)	3
**Pang Junxu (CHN) (27)**	**4**
Thepchaiya Un-Nooh (THA)	3
**Luca Brecel (BEL) (6)**	**4**
Anthony Hamilton (ENG)	3
**Shaun Murphy (ENG) (7)**	**4**
Jamie Clarke (WAL)	1
**Neil Robertson (AUS) (26)**	**4**
Jackson Page (WAL)	1
Gary Wilson (ENG) (10)	3
**Ross Muir (SCO)**	**4**
Zhou Yuelong (CHN) (23)	0
**Jamie Jones (WAL)**	**4**
Jack Lisowski (ENG) (18)	3
**Xu Si (CHN)**	**4**
**Barry Hawkins (ENG) (15)**	**4**
Jimmy Robertson (ENG)	2
**Anthony McGill (SCO) (31)**	**4**
Xiao Guodong (CHN)	2
**Kyren Wilson (ENG) (2)**	**4**
David Grace (ENG)	1

**Last 32**; Best of 7 frames
**(Northern Ireland) Mark Allen (3)**	**4**
(China) Lyu Haotian	2
**(Scotland) John Higgins (14)**	**4**
(England) David Gilbert (19)	1
**(England) Chris Wakelin (22)**	**4**
(China) Zhang Anda (11)	1
**(China) Pang Junxu (27)**	**4**
(Belgium) Luca Brecel (6)	3
(England) Shaun Murphy (7)	1
**(Australia) Neil Robertson (26)**	**4**
**(Scotland) Ross Muir**	**4**
(Wales) Jamie Jones	1
(China) Xu Si	0
**(England) Barry Hawkins (15)**	**4**
(Scotland) Anthony McGill (31)	1
**(England) Kyren Wilson (2)**	**4**

**Last 16**; Best of 7 frames
**(Northern Ireland) Mark Allen (3)**	**4**
(Scotland) John Higgins (14)	3
**(England) Chris Wakelin (22)**	**4**
(China) Pang Junxu (27)	3
**(Australia) Neil Robertson (26)**	**4**
(Scotland) Ross Muir	1
**(England) Barry Hawkins (15)**	**4**
(England) Kyren Wilson (2)	2

**Quarter-finals**; Best of 9 frames
(Northern Ireland) Mark Allen (3)	2
**(England) Chris Wakelin (22)**	**5**
**(Australia) Neil Robertson (26)**	**5**
(England) Barry Hawkins (15)	1

**Semi-finals**; Best of 11 frames
(England) Chris Wakelin (22)	1
**(Australia) Neil Robertson (26)**	**6**

=== Final ===
Final: Best of 17 frames. Referee: Marcel Eckardt; Brentwood Centre, Brentwood, England, 22 September 2024
Wu Yize; China	7–**9**	**Neil Robertson** (26); Australia
Afternoon: 0–**75**, 16–**75**, 49–**77**, 51–**72**, **64**–61, 47–**74**, 22–**104** (104), 0–**138** (138); Evening: **127**–0 (127), 23–**64**, **135**–0 (100), **82**–0, **73**–33, **95**–0, **70**–1, 16–**61**
(frame 9) 127	Highest break	**138** (frame 8)
2	Century breaks	2

== Qualifying rounds ==
The draw for the early rounds is shown below. Numbers in parentheses after the players' names denote the players' seeding, an "a" indicates amateur players who were not on the main World Snooker Tour, and players in bold denote match winners.

**Round 1 (Last 128)**; Best of 7 frames
**Ashley Carty (ENG) (65)**	**4**
Anton Kazakov (UKR) (a)	2
Reanne Evans (ENG) (96)	2
**Mink Nutcharut (THA) (107)**	**4**
**Liam Pullen (ENG) (80)**	**4**
Antoni Kowalski (POL) (106)	0
Rory Thor (MAS) (81)	3
**Oliver Lines (ENG) (110)**	**4**
Ben Mertens (BEL) (88)	1
**Chris Totten (SCO) (105)**	**4**
**Ian Burns (ENG) (73)**	**4**
Haydon Pinhey (ENG) (112)	3
**Zak Surety (ENG) (89)**	**4**
Farakh Ajaib (PAK) (99)	2
Alfie Burden (ENG) (72)	1
**Dylan Emery (WAL) (a)**	**4**
Ma Hailong (CHN) (69)	3
**Lei Peifan (CHN) (108)**	**4**
**Artemijs Žižins (LAT) (93)**	**4**
Duane Jones (WAL) (104)	2
**Jiang Jun (CHN) (76)**	**4**
Ahmed Aly Elsayed (USA) (109)	0
**Andrew Pagett (WAL) (85)**	**4**
Kreishh Gurbaxani (IND) (113)	2
**Dean Young (SCO) (84)**	**4**
Bai Yulu (CHN) (117)	0
**Ishpreet Singh Chadha (IND) (77)**	**4**
Simon Blackwell (ENG) (a)	1
**Bulcsú Révész (HUN) (91)**	**4**
Manasawin Phetmalaikul (THA) (97)	0
Stuart Carrington (ENG) (68)	0
**Wang Yuchen (HKG) (116)**	**4**

**Round 2 (Last 96)**; Best of 7 frames
**Liu Hongyu (CHN) (64)**	**4**
Ashley Carty (ENG) (65)	1
**Ricky Walden (ENG) (33)**	**4**
Mink Nutcharut (THA) (107)	0
**Fan Zhengyi (CHN) (49)**	**4**
Liam Pullen (ENG) (80)	2
Scott Donaldson (SCO) (48)	1
**Oliver Lines (ENG) (110)**	**4**
**Wu Yize (CHN) (41)**	**4**
Chris Totten (SCO) (105)	1
Martin O'Donnell (ENG) (56)	2
**Ian Burns (ENG) (73)**	**4**
Elliot Slessor (ENG) (40)	1
**Zak Surety (ENG) (89)**	**4**
**Ben Woollaston (ENG) (57)**	**4**
Dylan Emery (WAL) (a)	2
**Aaron Hill (IRL) (60)**	**4**
Lei Peifan (CHN) (108)	2
Robbie Williams (ENG) (37)	2
**Artemijs Žižins (LAT) (93)**	**4**
Tian Pengfei (CHN) (53)	2
**Jiang Jun (CHN) (76)**	**4**
Jordan Brown (NIR) (44)	2
**Andrew Pagett (WAL) (85)**	**4**
**Matthew Stevens (WAL) (45)**	**4**
Dean Young (SCO) (84)	1
Graeme Dott (SCO) (52)	2
**Ishpreet Singh Chadha (IND) (77)**	**4**
Yuan Sijun (CHN) (36)	2
**Bulcsú Révész (HUN) (91)**	**4**
**He Guoqiang (CHN) (61)**	**4**
Wang Yuchen (HKG) (116)	3

**Round 1 (Last 128)**; Best of 7 frames
**Long Zehuang** (CHN) (67)	**w/o**
Lim Kok Leong (MAS) (118) (Note: Lim Kok Leong did not show up for the qualifying match and so Long Zehuang was given a walkover.)	n/s
Amir Sarkhosh (IRN) (94)	1
**Liam Davies (WAL) (101)**	**4**
**Andrew Higginson (ENG) (78)**	**4**
Mark Joyce (ENG) (a)	0
Gong Chenzhi (CHN) (83)	3
**Michael Holt (ENG) (103)**	**4**
**Jimmy White (ENG) (86)**	**4**
Joshua Cooper (ENG) (a)	2
**Xing Zihao (CHN) (75)**	**4**
Paul Deaville (ENG) (a)	2
Julien Leclercq (BEL) (92)	1
**Oliver Sykes (ENG) (a)**	**4**
**Louis Heathcote (ENG) (70)**	**4**
Iulian Boiko (UKR) (a)	3
**Hammad Miah (ENG) (71)**	**4**
Huang Jiahao (CHN) (111)	0
**Mostafa Dorgham (EGY) (90)**	**4**
Allan Taylor (ENG) (102)	1
**Ross Muir** (SCO) (74)	**w/o**
Jonas Luz (BRA) (119) (Note: Jonas Luz withdrew and so Ross Muir was given a walkover.)	w/d
Liam Graham (SCO) (87)	3
**Joshua Thomond (ENG) (a)**	**4**
Stan Moody (ENG) (82)	2
**Cheung Ka Wai (HKG) (100)**	**4**
**Alexander Ursenbacher (SUI) (79)**	**4**
Mohammed Shehab (UAE) (115)	2
Robbie McGuigan (NIR) (95)	2
**Mitchell Mann (ENG) (98)**	**4**
**Marco Fu (HKG) (66)**	**4**
Haris Tahir (PAK) (114)	1

**Round 2 (Last 96)**; Best of 7 frames
Sanderson Lam (ENG) (62)	2
**Long Zehuang (CHN) (67)**	**4**
**Dominic Dale (WAL) (35)**	**4**
Liam Davies (WAL) (101)	0
Daniel Wells (WAL) (51)	3
**Andrew Higginson (ENG) (78)**	**4**
Sam Craigie (ENG) (46) (Note: Sam Craigie withdrew and so Michael Holt was given a walkover.)	w/d
**Michael Holt** (ENG) (103)	**w/o**
**Joe Perry (ENG) (43)**	**4**
Jimmy White (ENG) (86)	1
**Mark Davis (ENG) (54)**	**4**
Xing Zihao (CHN) (75)	1
**Thepchaiya Un-Nooh (THA) (38)**	**4**
Oliver Sykes (ENG) (a)	1
**Anthony Hamilton (ENG) (59)**	**4**
Louis Heathcote (ENG) (70)	2
**Jamie Clarke (WAL) (58)**	**4**
Hammad Miah (ENG) (71)	3
**Jackson Page (WAL) (39)**	**4**
Mostafa Dorgham (EGY) (90)	0
David Lilley (ENG) (55)	2
**Ross Muir (SCO) (74)**	**4**
**Jamie Jones (WAL) (42)**	**4**
Joshua Thomond (ENG) (a)	0
**Xu Si (CHN) (47)**	**4**
Cheung Ka Wai (HKG) (100)	3
**Jimmy Robertson (ENG) (50)**	**4**
Alexander Ursenbacher (SUI) (79)	1
**Xiao Guodong (CHN) (34)**	**4**
Mitchell Mann (ENG) (98)	1
**David Grace (ENG) (63)**	**4**
Marco Fu (HKG) (66)	0

Note: n/s=no-show (did not arrive in time for the match); w/d=withdrawn; w/o=walkover

== Century breaks ==
=== Final rounds centuries ===
A total of 46 century breaks were made in the final rounds of the tournament.

- 140, 128 – Anthony McGill
- 138, 104, 104 – Neil Robertson
- 137, 115 – Mark Selby
- 137 – Matthew Stevens
- 136 – Zhang Anda
- 131 – Aaron Hill
- 127, 126, 123, 108, 100 – Wu Yize
- 127, 104 – Jiang Jun
- 126 – Chris Wakelin
- 125 – He Guoqiang
- 125 – Oliver Lines
- 124, 124, 115 – Shaun Murphy
- 124 – David Gilbert
- 123 – Gary Wilson
- 120 – Jamie Clarke
- 119, 106, 105 – Hossein Vafaei
- 116 – Ricky Walden
- 114, 100 – Xu Si
- 114 – Ishpreet Singh Chadha
- 112 – Pang Junxu
- 110, 107 – Matthew Selt
- 110 – Stuart Bingham
- 109 – Si Jiahui
- 108, 105 – John Higgins
- 108 – Kyren Wilson
- 107 – Ross Muir
- 101 – Michael Holt
- 101 – Judd Trump
- 100 – Mark Allen
- 100 – Barry Hawkins

=== Qualifying rounds centuries ===
A total of 23 century breaks were made in the qualifying rounds of the tournament.

- 147 – Fan Zhengyi
- 141, 104 – Jiang Jun
- 138 – Artemijs Žižins
- 137, 114 – Louis Heathcote
- 130 – Jamie Jones
- 128 – Liu Hongyu
- 128 – Zak Surety
- 126 – Robbie Williams
- 125 – Jordan Brown
- 122 – Aaron Hill
- 121 – Oliver Sykes
- 113 – Ben Woollaston
- 112, 105 – Xing Zihao
- 112, 101 – Gong Chenzhi
- 107 – Andrew Higginson
- 102 – Jackson Page
- 101 – Cheung Ka Wai
- 100 – Simon Blackwell
- 100 – Mitchell Mann
