= 2023 Champion of Champions =

2023 Cazoo Champion of Champions

Tournament information
- Dates: 13–19 November 2023
- Venue: Toughsheet Community Stadium
- City: Bolton
- Country: England
- Organisation: Matchroom Sport
- Format: Non-ranking event
- Total prize fund: £440,000
- Winner's share: £150,000
- Highest break: Ali Carter (ENG) (143)

Final
- Champion: Mark Allen (NIR)
- Runner-up: Judd Trump (ENG)
- Score: 10–3

The 2023 Champion of Champions (officially the 2023 Cazoo Champion of Champions) was a professional snooker tournament that took between 13 and 19 November 2023 at the Toughsheet Community Stadium in Bolton, England. The 13th edition of the Champion of Champions since the tournament was first staged in 1978, it featured 16 participants, primarily winners of significant tournaments since the previous year's event.

As an invitational tournament, it carried no world ranking points. It immediately followed the 2023 International Championship which ended on 12 November. The winner received £150,000 from a total prize fund of £440,000.

Ronnie O'Sullivan was the defending champion, having defeated Judd Trump 10–6 in the previous final. However, O'Sullivan withdrew from the tournament, citing mental and physical health reasons, and was replaced by Ding Junhui in the draw.

Mark Allen won the event, defeating Trump 10–3 in the final.

== Format ==
The 16 players were divided into four groups of four. Each day, one group played two best of seven frame matches, and the two winners played a best of 11 frame group final. The four group finalists played in the best of 11 frame semi-finals, and the final was a best of 19 frame match played over two sessions.

The event was broadcast by ITV4, ITV3 and streamed on ITVX in the UK; by DAZN in the US, Brazil, and Spain; Setanta Sports in Ireland; Viaplay in the Netherlands, Poland, Lithuania, Estonia, Latvia, Iceland, Sweden, Norway, Denmark, and Finland; VTM in Belgium; Nova in the Czech Republic, and Slovakia; Pragosport in Romania; Sportklub in Bosnia and Herzegovina, Croatia, Macedonia, Montenegro, Serbia, Kosovo, and Slovenia; Saran Sport in Turkey; Rigour Media in China; Starhub in Singapore; Premier in the Philippines; Fox Sports in Australia; Sky Network in New Zealand; Supersport in South Africa; and by Matchroom Sport in all other territories.

=== Prize fund ===
The breakdown of prize money for this event is shown below:

- Winner: £150,000
- Runner-up: £60,000
- Semi-final: £30,000
- Group runner-up: £17,500
- First round loser: £12,500
- Total: £440,000

== Qualification ==
Players qualified for the event by winning events throughout the previous year. Events shown below in grey are for players who have already qualified for the event.

Qualification table
Tournament	Date of tournament final	Winner
~~2022 Champion of Champions~~	~~6 November 2022~~	~~Ronnie O'Sullivan (ENG)~~ (Note: Ding Junhui replaced Ronnie O'Sullivan who withdrew.)
2022 UK Championship	20 November 2022	Mark Allen (NIR)
2023 Masters	15 January 2023	Judd Trump (ENG)
2023 World Championship	1 May 2023	Luca Brecel (BEL)
2023 World Grand Prix	22 January 2023	Mark Allen (NIR)
2023 German Masters	5 February 2023	Ali Carter (ENG)
2023 Players Championship	26 February 2023	Shaun Murphy (ENG)
2023 Championship League Invitational	2 March 2023	John Higgins (SCO)
2023 WST Classic	22 March 2023	Mark Selby (ENG)
2023 Tour Championship	2 April 2023	Shaun Murphy (ENG)
2023 Championship League (ranking)	21 July 2023	Shaun Murphy (ENG)
2023 European Masters	27 August 2023	Barry Hawkins (ENG)
2023 Wuhan Open	15 October 2023	Judd Trump (ENG)
2023 International Championship	12 November 2023	Zhang Anda (CHN)
2022 Scottish Open	4 December 2022	Gary Wilson (ENG)
2022 English Open	18 December 2022	Mark Selby (ENG)
2023 Welsh Open	19 February 2023	Robert Milkins (ENG)
2023 English Open	8 October 2023	Judd Trump (ENG)
2023 Northern Ireland Open	29 October 2023	Judd Trump (ENG)
2023 British Open	1 October 2023	Mark Williams (WAL)
2023 World Women's Snooker Championship	4 March 2023	Baipat Siripaporn (THA)
2023 World Championship (runner-up)	1 May 2023	Mark Selby (ENG)
~~2023 Shanghai Masters~~	~~17 September 2023~~	~~Ronnie O'Sullivan (ENG)~~
2023 World Seniors Championship	7 May 2023	Jimmy White (ENG)
2023 Shoot Out	28 January 2023	Chris Wakelin (ENG)
2023 Six-red World Championship	11 March 2023	Ding Junhui (CHN)

Player also qualified by winning another tournament

== Summary ==
=== Group 4 ===
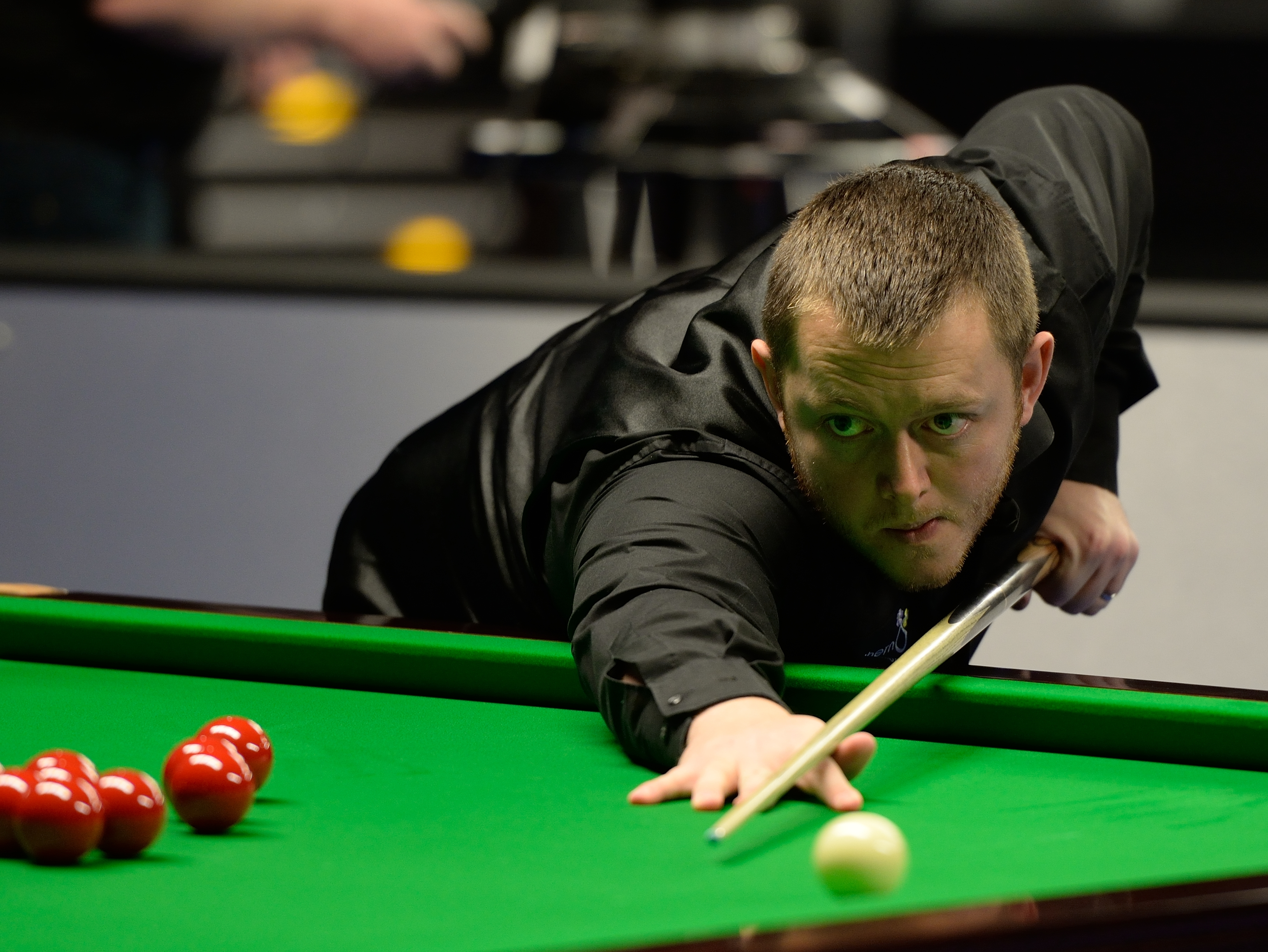
Mark Allen (pictured) won Group 4 with a 6–2 victory over Ali Carter, and went on to win the tournament.

Group 4 was played on 13 November. Jimmy White won the first frame against Mark Allen on the last black, but Allen won the next four consecutive frames to win the match by 4–1, making a century break of 108 in the last frame. Ali Carter made a 121 break in the sixth frame of the match against Mark Selby to take it to a deciding frame, which Carter took to win the match 4–3.

In the group final, Allen took on a 3–0 lead with two centuries of 135 and 100, and went on to lead by 5–1. Carter made a break of 143 to close to 2–5, but Allen took the last frame with a 98 break to win the match 6–2, advancing to the tournament semi-finals. Allen said after the match, in reference to his win at the 2020 edition of the event, which was played without an audience due to the COVID-19 pandemic: "It's nice to be back to a bit of normality, and performing in front of fans on the biggest stages in the biggest events is why we play. And I'm no different."

=== Group 2 ===
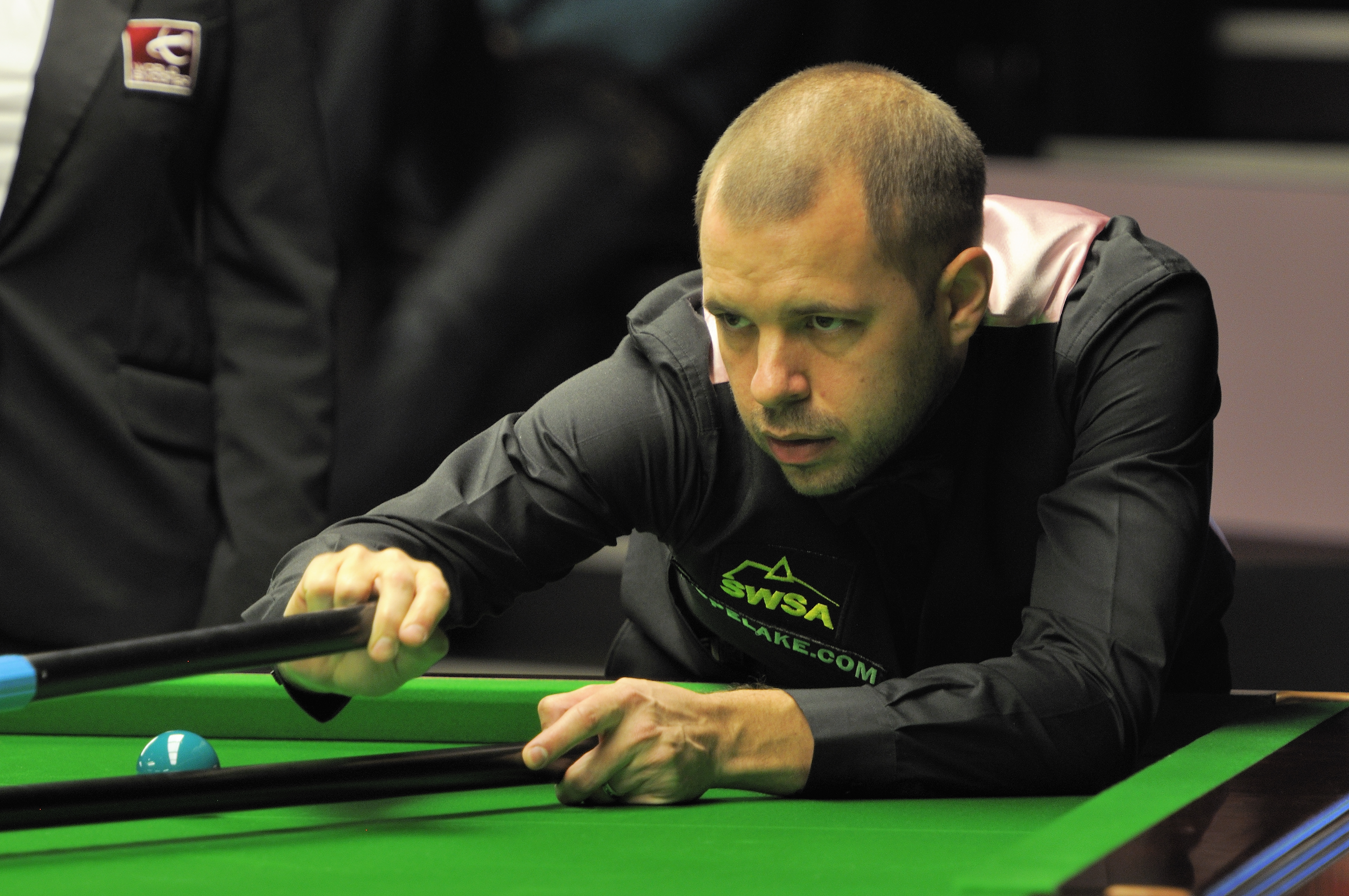
Barry Hawkins (pictured) won Group 2 with a 6–2 victory over Robert Milkins, but lost to Judd Trump in the semi-finals.

Group 2 was played on 14 November. Barry Hawkins defeated 2023 World Champion Luca Brecel with a 4–0 whitewash, making century breaks of 128 and 108 in the first and fourth frames. The match between Mark Williams and Robert Milkins was level at 2–2 after four close frames. Milkins won the next two frames with breaks of 74 and 64 to clinch the match by 4–2.

In the group final, Hawkins established a lead of 4–0 over Milkins. Milkins closed in to 2–5, but Hawkins won the last frame with a break of 83 for a 6–2 victory. Hawkins commented afterwards: "I'm delighted to get through because all the groups here are tough with tournament winners. They are all great players. It's a short format in the first match so it could be anyone who gets through."

=== Group 1 ===
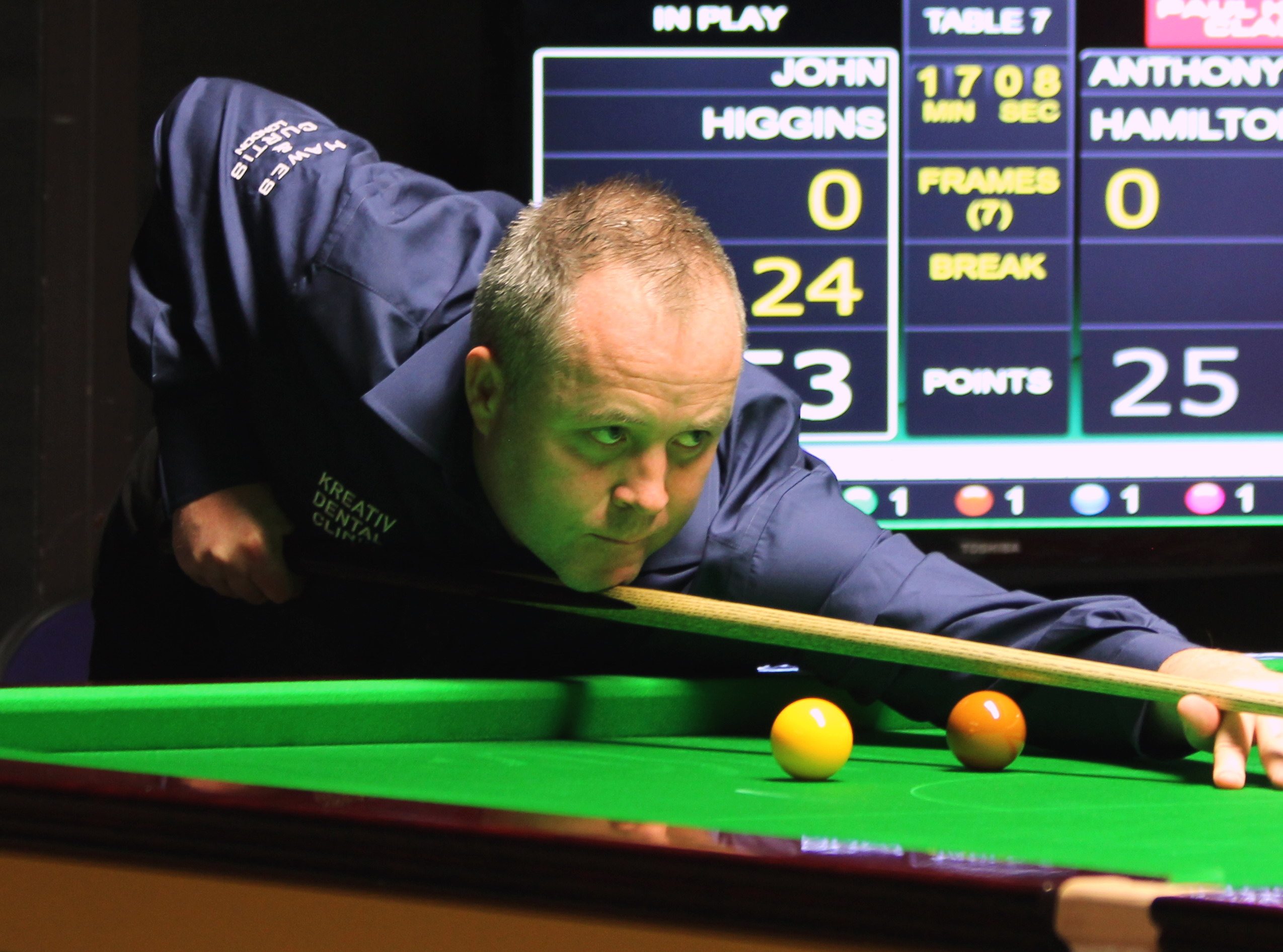
John Higgins (pictured) won Group 1 with a 6–1 victory over Ding Junhui, but lost to Mark Allen in the semi-finals.

Group 1 was played on 15 November. Defending champion O'Sullivan withdrew from the tournament, stating: "Mentally, I feel a bit drained and stressed and I want to look after my mental health and my body. I'm sorry to all the fans but I'll be back." O'Sullivan was replaced by Ding Junhui, the winner of the 2023 Six-red World Championship. John Higgins whitewashed Champion of Champions debutant Chris Wakelin by 4–0 after a safety battle in the last frame. Higgins commented: "[Wakelin] was getting the bad flicks. In a best to seven match, that can be the difference. I'm delighted to win but I need to play better." Entering the tournament on short notice to replace O'Sullivan, Ding faced compatriot Zhang Anda, who won the International Championship three days prior to qualify for his Champion of Champions debut. Ding quickly established a 3–0 lead, making breaks of 74, 65, and 100. Zhang came back from 4–60 behind in the fourth frame, winning three consecutive frames to even the score at 3–3, but Ding won the deciding frame on the final black for a 4–3 victory. ITV pundit Ken Doherty praised the quality of the match: "[It was] the most incredible best-of-seven match I've ever seen. It had everything. Ding was one ball away four times from winning the match."

In the group final, Higgins attempted a maximum break in the first frame, but missed the 13th red. Ding made a century break of 106 to level the score at 1–1. Higgins then won five consecutive frames with breaks of 83, 80, 93, 86, and 82 to win the match by 6–1. Higgins said: "I can't play any better than that. I've had six 80-odd breaks. It was good and I really enjoyed it. Me and Mark [Allen] always have great matches. Last time he pipped me 9–8 in the [2021] Northern Ireland final so maybe I owe him one back. I can't wait to play him."

=== Group 3 ===
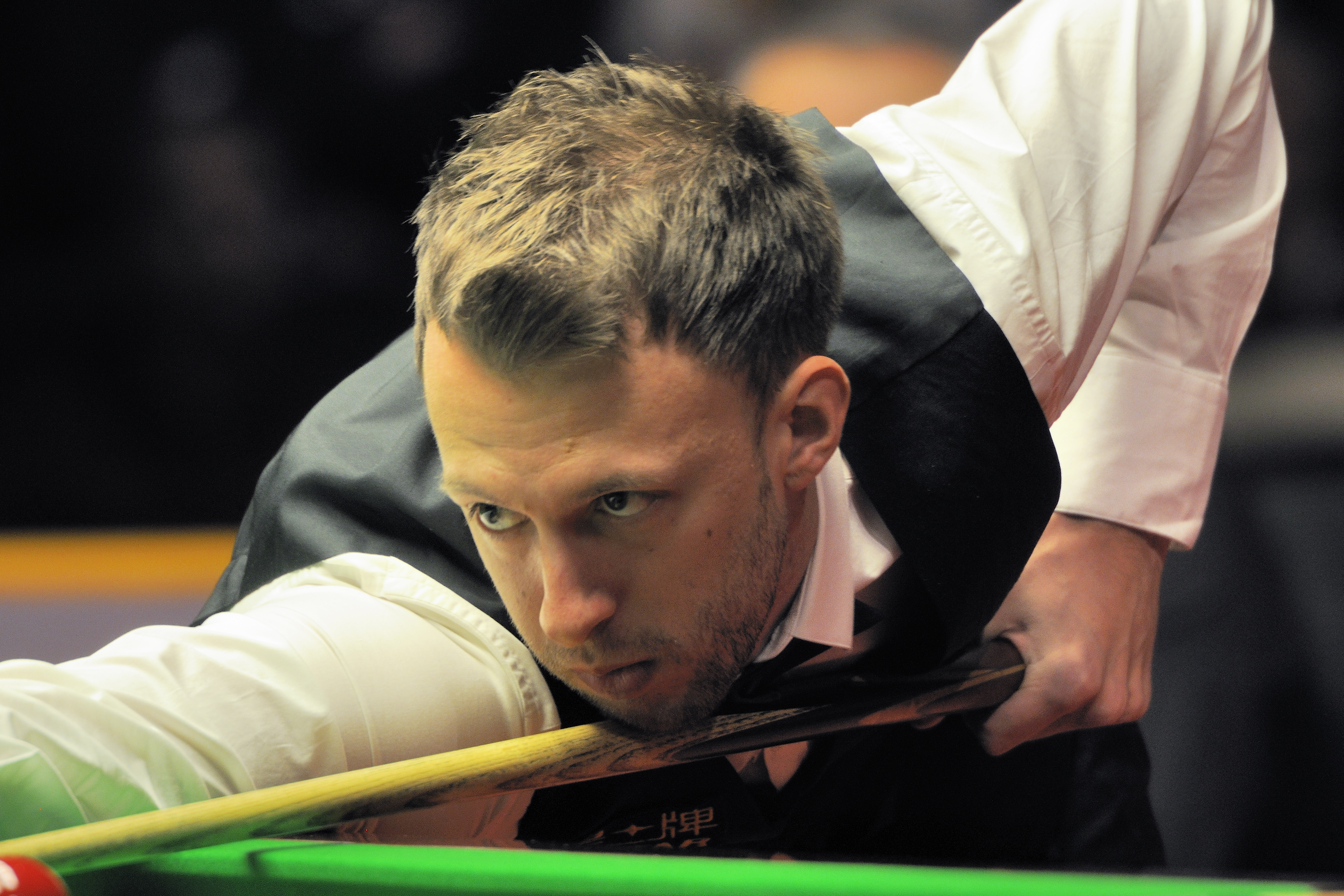
Judd Trump (pictured) won Group 3 with a 6–4 victory over Shaun Murphy, but lost to Mark Allen in the final.

Group 3 was played on 16 November. Champion of Champions debutant Baipat Siripaporn, who qualified through winning the 2023 Women's World Championship, was defeated in a 0–4 whitewash by Judd Trump in a contest which lasted just 49 minutes. Trump made a century break of 115 in the last frame. He commented: "I feel close [to my very best]. Every time I get in I feel like I'm going to score heavy and every time I push I feel like I can score. I feel like there's always more in the tank at the moment." Gary Wilson also made his first appearance in the Champion of Champions, he faced Shaun Murphy, who won the first frame, and Wilson leveled the score at 1–1 with a break of 58 in the second frame. Murphy won three consecutive frames to win the match by 4–1, making a century break of 107 in the fourth frame.

In the group final, Murphy lead by 2–0 with a century break of 107 in the first frame, and Trump made breaks of 73, 84, and 54 to even the score at 3–3. From 1–55 down in the seventh frame, Trump cleared up to win the frame on the last black. In the eighth frame, Trump was trailing by 1–67 and needed two snookers, he made another clearance to clinch the frame for a 5–3 lead. Murphy made a break of 58 to close to 4–5, and Trump won the tenth frame with a century break of 107 to claim a 6–4 victory. Despite the win, Trump said after the match: "I felt like I played terrible, it's one of the worst I've felt all season. I didn't feel like my cue action was there."

=== Semi-finals ===
The semi-finals were played on 17 and 18 November.

Trump played Hawkins in the first semi-final on 17 November. After a safety battle, Trump narrowly won the opening frame. He went on to take five consecutive frames, making breaks of 69 and 71, to secure a 5–0 lead. Hawkins won three frames in a row to narrow the score to 3–5, but Trump won the ninth frame for a victory of 6–3, securing a spot in his fifth Champion of Champions final. "Delighted to get over the line because it was getting a little bit twitchy at the end," Trump commented, "This is an event that suits me. The dress code, the format, everything plays into my hands and I feel relaxed in this event and at home with the format. I feel like it brings out the best in me."

Allen played Higgins in the second semi-final on 18 November. The score was tied at 2–2 at the mid-session interval, Allen having made breaks of 73 and 91, and Higgins 65 and 68 breaks. Allen won the next four consecutive frames after the interval with breaks of 102 and 77 to win the match by 6–2. After the match, Allen said: "Any win against John's a good win, as the match went on, John made a few errors and that was the difference, because I felt I kept my level. If you had told me three or four weeks ago I'd be in this position I would have laughed because I was in a bad place, but I have been working hard on the right things and my confidence has come back."

=== Final ===
Trump played Allen in the final on 19 November. Tournament director for Matchroom Pool, Brendan Moore returned from semi-retirement to referee the match.

==== Afternoon session ====
In the afternoon session, Allen won the first frame with a break of 59, and Trump made a century break of 123 to take the second frame. Allen made clearances from behind in frame three and four, winning both on the last black to lead by 3–1 at the mid-session interval. Allen went on to win four more consecutive frames to advance his lead to 7–1, making a total clearance of 137 in the sixth frame. Trump claimed the ninth and last frame of the session to narrow the deficit to 2–7.

==== Evening session ====
In the evening session Trump won the 10th frame with a break of 77, but Allen won the last three frames to clinch a 10–3 victory. After the match, Allen dedicated his victory to coach Joe Shortt, who died earlier this year, and Allen said "Joe Shortt's not here anymore. He was a big part of my life, not just on the table but off it, and me and my dad have lost one of our closest friends – so that was for Joe."

== Tournament draw ==
The draw for the tournament is shown below. Numbers in parentheses after the players' names denote the top eight seeded players, whilst players in bold denote match winners.

**Group semi-finals** **(last 16)**; Best of 7 frames
**Ding Junhui (CHN)**	**4**
Zhang Anda (CHN)	3
**Group 1**
**John Higgins (SCO) (8)**	**4**
Chris Wakelin (ENG)	0
Mark Selby (ENG) (5)	3
**Ali Carter (ENG)**	**4**
**Group 4**
**Mark Allen (NIR) (4)**	**4**
Jimmy White (ENG)	1
**Judd Trump (ENG) (3)**	**4**
Baipat Siripaporn (THA)	0
**Group 3**
**Shaun Murphy (ENG) (6)**	**4**
Gary Wilson (ENG)	1
Mark Williams (WAL) (7)	2
**Robert Milkins (ENG)**	**4**
**Group 2**
Luca Brecel (BEL) (2)	0
**Barry Hawkins (ENG)**	**4**

**Group finals** **(quarter-finals)**; Best of 11 frames
Ding Junhui (CHN)	1
**John Higgins (SCO) (8)**	**6**
Ali Carter (ENG)	2
**Mark Allen (NIR) (4)**	**6**
**Judd Trump (ENG) (3)**	**6**
Shaun Murphy (ENG) (6)	4
Robert Milkins (ENG)	2
**Barry Hawkins (ENG)**	**6**

**Semi-finals**; Best of 11 frames
John Higgins (SCO) (8)	2
**Mark Allen (NIR) (4)**	**6**
**Judd Trump (ENG) (3)**	**6**
Barry Hawkins (ENG)	3

**Final**; Best of 19 frames
**Mark Allen (NIR) (4)**	**10**
Judd Trump (ENG) (3)	3

=== Final ===
Final: Best of 19 frames. Referee: Brendan Moore; Toughsheet Community Stadium, Bolton, England, 19 November 2023
**Mark Allen** (4); Northern Ireland	**10**–3	Judd Trump (3); England
Afternoon: **89**–6, 0–**123** (123), **68**–54, **63**–62, **75**–48, **137**–0 (137), **66**–14, **65**–8, 13–**68**; Evening: 0–**83**, **61**–32, **75**–0, **75**–0
(frame 6) **137**	Highest break	123 (frame 2)
1	Century breaks	1

== Century breaks ==
A total of 16 century breaks were made during the tournament.

- 143, 121 – Ali Carter
- 137, 135, 108, 102, 100 – Mark Allen
- 128, 108 – Barry Hawkins
- 123, 115, 107 – Judd Trump
- 107, 107 – Shaun Murphy
- 106, 100 – Ding Junhui
