= Fan Zhengyi =

Chinese snooker player

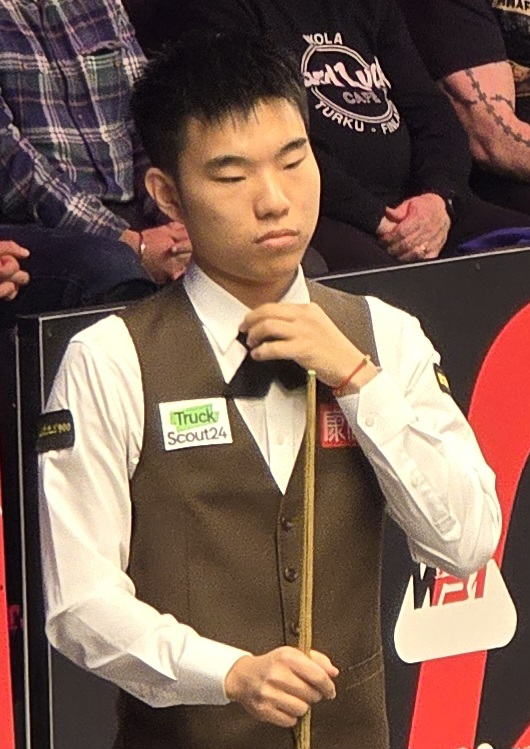
- Fan at the 2025 German Masters

Personal information
- Nickname: The Iceman
- Born: 27 January 2001 (age 25) Harbin, Heilongjiang, China

Sport
- Country: China
- Sport: Snooker
- Professional: 2018–present
- Highest ranking: 29 (October 2023)
- Current ranking: 51 (as of 26 October 2026)
- Maximum breaks: 2

Tournament wins
- Ranking: 1

Fan Zhengyi
- Simplified Chinese: 范争一
- Traditional Chinese: 範爭一
Transcriptions
Standard Mandarin
- Hanyu Pinyin: Fàn Zhēngyī
Yue: Cantonese
- Yale Romanization: Faahn Jāng Yāt
- Jyutping: Faan⁶ Zang¹ Jat¹

Fan Zhengyi (Chinese: 范争一; born 27 January 2001) is a Chinese professional snooker player. He won the IBSF World Under-21 Snooker Championship in 2017, and turned professional in 2018. He had a breakthrough season in 2021–22 when he reached his first ranking quarter-final at the 2022 German Masters and then won his first ranking title at the 2022 European Masters, defeating then six-time world champion Ronnie O'Sullivan 10–9 in the final. He became the fifth Chinese player to win a ranking title, following Ding Junhui, Liang Wenbo, Yan Bingtao, and Zhao Xintong.

== Career ==
Fan started playing snooker at the age of 5 in Harbin. Just one year later, he finished 5th in the National Youth Pool Championships. When he was 8 he finished 3rd in the National Youth Snooker Championships. A trip to Singapore at the age of 14 saw him reach the final of the 2015 Cuesports Singapore Snooker Open, losing to experienced local player Marvin Lim 5–3, after taking a 2–0 lead.

=== Early career ===
In July 2017, Fan won five out of the last six frames to beat top seed Luo Honghao 7–6 and win the IBSF World Under-21 Snooker Championship at the tournament held in China. With this victory, he was awarded a two-year Main Tour card for the professional Snooker tour.

He competed at the 2018 World Snooker Team Cup representing China with Zhang Jiankang but they lost to India 2–3 in the Round of 16.

=== 2018–19 season ===
At just 17, Fan was the youngest player on the professional tour in 2018–19. His first match was a 4–1 loss to Jack Lisowski in the Riga Masters, and his first win was against his practice partner Lyu Haotian 6–5 in the International Championship. However, he could only manage one further win in the remainder of the season, which finished in a 10–5 loss to Chris Wakelin in the World Championship.

=== 2019–20 season ===
Fan played in the 2019 China National Championship in Xi'an, seeded No. 3, but lost in the third round to Jin Long 4–2. He did, however, achieve the highest break in the competition of 143.

Fan's best performance in the 2019–20 season came in the English Open. After a close win against Riley Parsons 4–3, he faced Chris Wakelin. At 3-3 the match ended on a respotted black in the final frame. After easy misses by both players, Fan potted it to reach the last 32 for the first time. His run was ended by Shaun Murphy 4–0.

In subsequent tournaments Fan had further victories against Zhou Yuelong and Peter Lines. With the outbreak of COVID-19, the snooker season was suspended. Fan Zhengyi was one of only 4 Chinese players to stay in the UK, but was unable to practice due to lockdown restrictions. He played in the rescheduled World Championship, and beat amateur Dylan Emery 6–4 in the first round. He produced a fine attacking display in the second round against Dominic Dale, but eventually lost 6–4, after having led 4–3. Thus his season finished ranked 92, which meant he was relegated from the tour.

In an attempt to regain his Tour Card, Fan entered the 2020 Q School. With 7 wins and no losses in the first event he was successful, beating two-time ranking event winner Michael White 4–2 in the final round, thus gaining entry to the 2020-21 and 2021-22 snooker seasons.

=== 2020–21 season ===
Fan played in the very first match of the 2020–21 season, against Judd Trump in a Championship League group. He finished the group in 2nd place after beating David Lilley and drawing with Alan McManus. After that he had a run of six losses. His only win against a professional in match longer than best-of-5 frames was a 6–4 defeat of Zak Surety in the World Championship. He finished the season ranked 118.

=== 2021–22 season ===
After the 2021 season, Fan returned to China for the first time in 18 months. He played in the China City teams event in Xi'an, playing for the local Shaanxi team alongside Zhao Xintong and Li Hang. They were beaten in the quarterfinal by eventual winners, Shanghai.

His 2021–22 season began with four losses and one win, against amateur David Lilley. Fan then produced his first win against a top-20 player, beating Thepchaiya Un-nooh 5–3 in the first round of qualifying for the German Masters. He followed this up with a 5–4 win over Lu Ning to qualify for the main event, held at the Tempodrom in Berlin. He defeated opponents including Liam Highfield and Andrew Higginson, before a 0–5 loss to Mark Allen in the quarterfinals.

In the European Masters, Fan produced his best performance to date in a ranking tournament, defeating opponents including Kyren Wilson, Yan Bingtao, David Gilbert, and Graeme Dott to reach his first ranking final. He faced six-time world champion Ronnie O'Sullivan. Fan took two-frame leads at 4–2, 6–4, and 8–6, but O'Sullivan recovered to draw level each time. Fan took a 9–8 lead, but O'Sullivan again drew level to force a deciding frame. After O'Sullivan missed a long red in the decider, Fan made a 92 break to win the match 10–9 for his first ranking title. Fan became the fifth Chinese player to win a ranking event, after Ding Junhui, Liang Wenbo, Yan Bingtao, and Zhao Xintong.

=== 2022–23 season ===
In November 2022, Fan reached the semifinals of the Champion of Champions, held in Bolton, defeating Neil Robertson and Ryan Day in the process.

In April 2023, Zhengyi defeated Stephen Maguire in the final qualifying round 10–6 to reach the World Snooker Championship, held at the Crucible Theatre in Sheffield for the first time. In the last 32 of the World Championship, Fan was defeated 10–5 by Mark Allen in a match disrupted by an environmental protest.

=== 2023–24 season ===
Fan started the season ranked 32, his highest ranking start to a season to date (he reached a ranking peak of 29 in October 2023). At the invitational Shanghai Masters, he recorded victories over Gary Wilson and Mark Allen, before losing 6–1 in the quarterfinals to Neil Robertson.

His best ranking performances over the rest of the season were quarterfinal appearances at the British Open and the German Masters (losing 5–1 to Mark Williams and 5–0 to Kyren Wilson, respectively). He was defeated in second qualifying round of the World Championship by compatriot Jiang Jun by a 10–8 scoreline.

=== 2024–25 season ===
He opened his season with two wins and a draw to top his round-robin group at the 2024 Championship League in Leicester in June 2024. At the 2024 English Open in Brentwood in September 2024, he made the first maximum break of his career in the final frame of his 4‍–‍2 win over Liam Pullen. He backed-up that performance with a win over 16th seed Ryan Day. He qualified for the 2025 World Snooker Championship with a 10–4 victory over Michael Holt. In the first round of the main draw, he was defeated again by Mark Allen, despite going into an early lead.

=== 2025–26 season ===
He made the second official 147 maximum of his career on 17 July 2025 in his match in the 2025 Championship League against Xu Si. He reached the final round of qualifying for the World Championship with a comprehensive 10–3 win over compatriot Lan Yuhao and a 10–4 win against Jimmy Robertson, before also beating Ben Mertens 10–4 to earn a place at The Crucible for the third time in four years. At The Crucible he was defeated on a deciding frame by seed Shaun Murphy.

=== 2026–27 season ===
In September 2026, he reached the last 32 at the 2026 Shenzhen Open with victory over defending champion Mark Williams. At the 2026 International Championship in Nanjing, he defeated Judd Trump on his way to the semi-finals were his run was ended by Kyren Wilson.

== Technique ==
Fan has a very unusual technique. He is very left-eye dominant, and when playing the shot, his cue is to the left of his head. Before turning professional, he was a member of the Wiraka Snooker Academy and was coached by former professional Roger Leighton.

== Personal life ==
Fan was also a promising table tennis player, but decided to concentrate on snooker.

During his first three years as a professional, he made no century breaks, despite being known as a heavy scorer in junior and amateur tournaments in China. In an interview with Liu Song he revealed that he deliberately avoided making them, wanting his first professional century to be a 147. He nearly achieved this in the World Championship against Zak Surety, but missed a difficult 13th red to a baulk pocket with the remaining balls in good positions. After this, he abandoned the plan.

During the season, he lives in Sheffield. During his first 6 years as a professional, he practiced at the Victoria Academy. As of July 2024, he now practices at the Ding Junhui Academy.

== Performance and rankings timeline ==
Tournament	2016/ 17	2017/ 18	2018/ 19	2019/ 20	2020/ 21	2021/ 22	2022/ 23	2023/ 24	2024/ 25	2025/ 26	2026/ 27
Ranking (Note: It shows the ranking at the beginning of the season)	(Note: He was an amateur)		(Note: New players on the Main Tour don't have a ranking)	92	(Note: Players qualified through Q School started the season without ranking points)	85	36	32	50	48	57
Ranking tournaments
Championship League	Non-Ranking Event				RR	A	A	RR	2R	RR	RR
China Open	1R	LQ	LQ	Tournament Not Held							LQ
Wuhan Open	Tournament Not Held							LQ	1R	LQ	LQ
British Open	Tournament Not Held					1R	LQ	QF	LQ	LQ	3R
English Open	A	A	1R	3R	1R	LQ	1R	1R	3R	2R	2R
Shenzhen Open (Note: The event was called the Xi'an Grand Prix (2024/2025–2025/2026))	Tournament Not Held								LQ	1R	1R
Northern Ireland Open	A	A	1R	1R	1R	1R	1R	1R	1R	1R	LQ
International Championship	A	LQ	1R	LQ	Not Held			1R	1R	1R	SF
UK Championship	A	A	1R	2R	1R	2R	LQ	1R	LQ	LQ	
Shoot Out	A	A	1R	1R	1R	2R	3R	1R	3R	4R	
Scottish Open	A	A	1R	1R	1R	LQ	LQ	LQ	1R	1R	
German Masters	A	A	LQ	LQ	LQ	QF	1R	QF	1R	LQ	
Welsh Open	A	A	1R	2R	1R	LQ	LQ	3R	1R	1R	
World Grand Prix	DNQ	DNQ	DNQ	DNQ	DNQ	DNQ	DNQ	DNQ	DNQ	DNQ	
Players Championship	DNQ	DNQ	DNQ	DNQ	DNQ	DNQ	DNQ	DNQ	DNQ	DNQ	
World Open	A	LQ	LQ	LQ	Not Held			2R	LQ	LQ	
Tour Championship	Not Held		DNQ	DNQ	DNQ	DNQ	DNQ	DNQ	DNQ	DNQ	
World Championship	A	A	LQ	LQ	LQ	LQ	1R	LQ	1R	1R	
Non-ranking tournaments
Shanghai Masters	Ranking		1R	A	Not Held			QF	A	A	A
Champion of Champions	A	A	A	A	A	A	SF	A	A	A	
Championship League	A	A	A	A	A	A	A	RR	A	A	
Former ranking tournaments
Indian Open	A	A	LQ	Tournament Not Held							
Riga Masters	A	A	LQ	LQ	Tournament Not Held						
China Championship	NR	LQ	LQ	LQ	Tournament Not Held						
WST Pro Series	Tournament Not Held				RR	Tournament Not Held					
Turkish Masters	Tournament Not Held					1R	Tournament Not Held				
Gibraltar Open	A	A	2R	1R	2R	1R	Tournament Not Held				
WST Classic	Tournament Not Held						2R	Tournament Not Held			
European Masters	A	A	LQ	LQ	1R	W	LQ	LQ	Not Held		
Saudi Arabia Masters	Tournament Not Held								3R	3R	NH
Former non-ranking tournaments
Six-red World Championship	A	A	A	A	Not Held		LQ	Tournament Not Held			
Haining Open	2R	QF	2R	A	NH	A	A	Tournament Not Held			

Performance Table Legend
LQ	lost in the qualifying draw	#R	lost in the early rounds of the tournament (WR = Wildcard round, RR = Round robin)	QF	lost in the quarter-finals
SF	lost in the semi-finals	F	lost in the final	W	won the tournament
DNQ	did not qualify for the tournament	A	did not participate in the tournament	WD	withdrew from the tournament

NH / Not Held	means an event was not held.
NR / Non-Ranking Event	means an event is/was no longer a ranking event.
R / Ranking Event	means an event is/was a ranking event.
MR / Minor-Ranking Event	means an event is/was a minor-ranking event.

== Career finals ==
=== Ranking finals: 1 (1 title) ===
Outcome	No.	Year	Championship	Opponent	Score
Winner	1.	2022	European Masters	(England) Ronnie O'Sullivan	10–9

=== Pro-am finals: 1 ===
Outcome	No.	Year	Championship	Opponent in the final	Score
Runner-up	1.	2015	Singapore Snooker Open	(Singapore) Marvin Lim	3–5

=== Amateur finals: 2 (1 title) ===
Outcome	No.	Year	Championship	Opponent	Score
Runner-up	1.	2017	ACBS Asian Under-21 Snooker Championship	(China) Yuan Sijun	2–6
Winner	1.	2017	World Under-21 Snooker Championship	(China) Luo Honghao	7–6
