= He Guoqiang (snooker player) =

Chinese snooker player (born 2000)

Personal information
- Nickname: He-Man
- Born: 5 August 2000 (age 26) Leiyang, Hunan, China

Sport
- Country: China
- Sport: Snooker
- Professional: 2023–present
- Highest ranking: 44 (December 2025)
- Current ranking: 49 (as of 7 November 2026)
- Best ranking finish: Quarter-final (2023 British Open)

He Guoqiang (Chinese: 贺国强) is a Chinese professional snooker player. The IBSF World Under-18 Snooker Championship winner in 2018, Guoqiang earned a two-year card on the World Snooker Tour from the 2023–24 snooker season and reached the quarter-final of the 2023 British Open.

== Career ==
In 2018, He won the IBSF World Under-18 Snooker Championship. In the final he defeated his compatriot Lei Peifan 5-4, on a deciding frame. In 2018 he also scored his first competitive 147 break, during the under-21 IBSF Championship in Jinan. That same year, playing as a wildcard, Guoqiang secured a 6-1 win over Gary Wilson at the International Championship held in Daqing, China. Guoqiang won the non-ranking invitation event 2021 Haining Snooker Open. In the final He beat Huang Jiahao 5-0. In 2021 It was the first time players from the UK and around the world could not play in the event due to COVID-19 restrictions.

In the final round of the second Asia-Oceania Q School event held in Bangkok in June 2023, He came back from 3-1 down to win 4-3 against compatriot Wang Yuchen to earn a two-year card on the World Snooker Tour, starting with 2023–24 snooker season.

=== 2023-24 season ===
He recorded his first win as a professional when he defeated Elliot Slessor at the British Open in August 2023. He recorded a 5-4 win over world No. 8 Kyren Wilson in the first round of the Wuhan Open in September 2023, winning the deciding frame from 67-0 down. That month, he reached the last-16 of a ranking event for the first time, at the 2023 British Open in Cheltenham, where he beat world No. 12 Barry Hawkins to reach the quarter-final. The following week He recorded a notable win over Ryan Day at the English Open, and recorded another victory over a top-16 player when he edged Hossein Vafaei 4-3 in the next round. He qualified for the 2024 German Masters in Berlin with a win over the John Astley. At the event, he defeated former World Champion Mark Williams 5-1.

In the qualifying rounds of the 2024 World Snooker Championship he defeated world ranked number 25 Anthony McGill 10-5.

=== 2024-25 season ===
He began the 2024-25 snooker season with a 3-0 win over Ronnie O'Sullivan to top his round-robin group at the 2024 Championship League. At the 2024 English Open in Brentwood in September 2024 he defeated Ronnie O'Sullivan again, by a 4-2 margin. He also defeated Stephen Maguire on his way to the last-16. He reached the last-64 at the 2024 Northern Ireland Open. He defeated Scott Donaldson to reach the final round of qualifying for 2025 World Championships where he lost 5-10 to Ali Carter.

=== 2025-26 season ===
He entered the 2025-26 snooker season with the world ranking of no. 45. In June 2025, he recorded a 4-0 whitewash win over Farakh Ajaib in the 2025 British Open qualifying round whilst wearing a glove on his bridging hand while playing. He was drawn in the round-robin stage of the 2025 Championship League against Daniel Wells, Ng On Yee and Leone Crowley.

In October 2025, He reached the last-16 of the 2025 Xi'an Grand Prix with a 5-4 win over Neil Robertson. He also reached the last-16 of the 2025 Northern Ireland Open following a win over compatriot Wu Yize. In November, he reached the fourth round of qualifying at the 2025 UK Championship, scoring centuries of 129 and 110 in a win over Stan Moody.

In the penultimate round of qualifying for the 2026 World Snooker Championship he defeated his compatriot Long Zehuang 10-8 to set up a final round match against world number 18 Jack Lisowski, winning 10-5 to qualify for his debut at The Crucible. He was defeated in the first round of the main draw by Ronnie O'Sullivan.

== Performance and rankings timeline ==
Tournament	2013/ 14	2014/ 15	2015/ 16	2016/ 17	2017/ 18	2018/ 19	2021/ 22	2022/ 23	2023/ 24	2024/ 25	2025/ 26	2026/ 27
Ranking (Note: It shows the ranking at the beginning of the season)	(Note: He was an amateur)								(Note: New players on the Main Tour don't have a ranking)	65	45	47
Ranking tournaments
Championship League	Non-Ranking Event						A	A	A	2R	RR	2R
China Open	A	A	A	A	A	A	Tournament Not Held					LQ
Wuhan Open	Tournament Not Held								3R	1R	LQ	1R
British Open	Tournament Not Held						A	A	QF	LQ	1R	2R
English Open	Not Held			A	A	A	A	A	3R	3R	1R	LQ
Shenzhen Open (Note: The event was called the Xi'an Grand Prix (2024/2025–2025/2026))	Tournament Not Held									1R	3R	LQ
Northern Ireland Open	Not Held			A	A	A	A	A	LQ	1R	3R	WD
International Championship	A	A	A	A	A	1R	Not Held		LQ	1R	2R	LQ
UK Championship	A	A	A	A	A	A	A	A	LQ	1R	LQ	
Shoot Out	Non-Ranking Event			A	A	A	A	A	1R	2R	1R	
Scottish Open	Not Held			A	A	A	A	A	1R	1R	2R	LQ
German Masters	A	A	A	A	A	A	A	A	2R	WD	LQ	LQ
Welsh Open	A	A	A	A	A	A	A	A	LQ	LQ	LQ	
World Grand Prix	NH	NR	DNQ	DNQ	DNQ	DNQ	DNQ	DNQ	DNQ	DNQ	DNQ	
Players Championship (Note: The event was called the Players Tour Championship Grand Final (2013/2014–2015/2016))	DNQ	DNQ	DNQ	DNQ	DNQ	DNQ	DNQ	DNQ	DNQ	DNQ	DNQ	
World Open	A	Not Held		A	A	LQ	Not Held		2R	1R	1R	
Tour Championship	Tournament Not Held					DNQ	DNQ	DNQ	DNQ	DNQ	DNQ	
World Championship	A	A	A	A	A	A	A	A	LQ	LQ	1R	
Former ranking tournaments
China Championship	Not Held			NR	A	LQ	Tournament Not Held					
European Masters	Not Held			A	A	A	A	A	LQ	Not Held		
Saudi Arabia Masters	Tournament Not Held									2R	3R	NH
Former non-ranking tournaments
Haining Open	NH	Minor-Rank		1R	4R	3R	W	A	Tournament Not Held			

Performance Table Legend
LQ	lost in the qualifying draw	#R	lost in the early rounds of the tournament (WR = Wildcard round, RR = Round robin)	QF	lost in the quarter-finals
SF	lost in the semi-finals	F	lost in the final	W	won the tournament
DNQ	did not qualify for the tournament	A	did not participate in the tournament	WD	withdrew from the tournament

NH / Not Held	means an event was not held.
NR / Non-Ranking Event	means an event is/was no longer a ranking event.
R / Ranking Event	means an event is/was a ranking event.
MR / Minor-Ranking Event	means an event is/was a minor-ranking event.

== Career finals ==
=== Non-ranking finals: 1 (1 title) ===
Outcome	No.	Year	Championship	Opponent in the final	Score
Winner	1.	2021	Haining Open	(China) Huang Jiahao	5–0
