= 2023 British Open =

Snooker tournament

2023 Cazoo British Open

Tournament information
- Dates: 25 September – 1 October 2023
- Venue: The Centaur
- City: Cheltenham
- Country: England
- Organisation: World Snooker Tour
- Format: Ranking event
- Total prize fund: £478,000
- Winner's share: £100,000
- Highest break: Xiao Guodong (CHN) (140)

Final
- Champion: Mark Williams (WAL)
- Runner-up: Mark Selby (ENG)
- Score: 10–7

}

The 2023 British Open (officially the 2023 Cazoo British Open) was a professional snooker tournament that took place from 25 September to 1 October 2023 at the Centaur in Cheltenham, England. Qualifying took place from 14 to 19 August at the Morningside Arena in Leicester. The third ranking tournament of the 2023–24 snooker season, it followed the 2023 European Masters and preceded the 2023 English Open. Organised by the World Snooker Tour and sponsored by car retailer Cazoo, it was broadcast domestically in the UK by ITV Sport, in Europe by Eurosport, and internationally by other broadcasters. The winner received £100,000 from a total prize fund of £478,000.

The defending champion was Ryan Day, who defeated Mark Allen 10–7 in the 2022 final, but he lost 2–4 to Ali Carter in the last 32. Mark Williams defeated Mark Selby 10–7 in the final to win his third British Open title and his 25th ranking title. Aged 48 years and 194 days, he became the second-oldest player to win a ranking event, behind Ray Reardon, who won the 1982 Professional Players Tournament aged 50 years and 14 days.

The event's main stage produced 51 century breaks and the qualifying round produced 11 centuries. Xiao Guodong made the tournament's highest break, a 140 in his quarter-final match against Tom Ford.

== Format ==
The draw was randomised after each round. After the first round, the draw was made by Alan McManus and Rob Walker on live TV. All matches before the quarter-final stage were played as the best of seven frames, while the quarter-finals were best of nine frames, the semi-finals best of 11 frames, and the final best of 19 frames. The winner received the Clive Everton trophy and secured a place in the upcoming Champion of Champions tournament.

The event was broadcast by ITV Sport in the United Kingdom, by Eurosport and Discovery+ in Europe; by Liaoning TV, Migu, Youku, and Huya Live in China; by Now TV in Hong Kong; by Astro SuperSport in Malaysia and Brunei; by TrueVision in Thailand; by Premier Sports Network in the Philippines; and by Fastsports in Pakistan. It was available from Matchroom Sport in all other territories.

=== Prize fund ===
The winner of the event received £100,000 from a total prize fund of £478,000. The breakdown of prize money for this event is shown below:

- Winner: £100,000
- Runner-up: £45,000
- Semi-final: £20,000
- Quarter-final: £12,000
- Last 16: £8,000
- Last 32: £5,000
- Last 64: £3,000
- Highest break: £5,000
- Total: £478,000

== Summary ==
World number one Ronnie O'Sullivan withdrew from the tournament for medical reasons and was replaced in the draw by Steven Hallworth.

=== Qualifying round ===
Qualifying for the tournament took place from 14 to 19 August 2023 at the Morningside Arena in Leicester, England, although qualifiers featuring the defending champion and the top 15 players in the snooker world rankings were held over and played in Cheltenham. The highest break made during the Leicester qualifiers was a 136 by Daniel Wells.

=== Early rounds ===
The reigning world champion Luca Brecel lost 3–4 to Ding Junhui in their held-over qualifying match. This meant that Brecel was unable to overtake Ronnie O'Sullivan as the world number one. Mark Allen, who defeated Anthony McGill 4–1, would have overtaken O'Sullivan had he won the tournament, but he was whitewashed 0–4 by Kyren Wilson in his first-round match.

Also in the first round, world number four Judd Trump lost 3–4 to world number 113 Hammad Miah, while world number six Neil Robertson lost 1–4 to world number 30 Si Jiahui. World number nine John Higgins was beaten 1–4 by world number 47 Robbie Williams, and world number 22 Stuart Bingham was defeated 2–4 by world number 105 Ishpreet Singh Chadha.

=== Later rounds ===
In the last 16, Mark Selby defeated David Gilbert 4–3 in a match that ended just before 00:45 BST. Gilbert lost the decider when he went in-off on the final black ball. Williams defeated Ding 4–2.

In the quarter-finals, Williams defeated Fan Zhengyi 5–1, making two centuries. Hossein Vafaei lost the first two frames against He Guoqiang but went on to win five consecutive frames, making two centuries, for a 5–2 win. Selby defeated Jack Lisowski 5–4. Xiao Guodong defeated Tom Ford 5–3, making the tournament's highest break of 140 in the final frame.

In the semi-finals, Williams defeated Vafaei 6–3 and Selby whitewashed Xiao 6–0, making a 123 break in the fourth frame.

==== Final ====
The final was played over the best of 19 frames between Williams and Selby. In the afternoon session, Williams made two century breaks as he won five of the first six frames. Selby won the last two frames of the session, reducing Williams's lead to 5–3. After the first four frames of the evening session, Williams maintained his two-frame lead at 7–5. Williams took the 13th frame, but Selby won the 54-minute 14th frame and also took the 15th with a 68 break to trail by one at 8–7. Selby led by 56 points in the 16th frame, but Williams, who had not potted a ball for 39 minutes, made a 69 clearance to move one from victory at 9–7. In the 17th frame, Williams required a snooker but got the foul points he required and won the frame on the black, clinching the match 10–7. It was Williams's third British Open title—having previously won the tournament in 1997 and 2021—and his 25th ranking title. Aged 48 years and 194 days, he surpassed 2022 Welsh Open champion Joe Perry to become the second-oldest winner of a ranking title. Ray Reardon remained the oldest ranking winner, having won the 1982 Professional Players Tournament at age 50. "I never expected I could still get to finals at 48 and win, playing someone like Mark Selby", Williams commented.

== Main draw ==
Match winners are shown in bold.

=== Round 1 ===
The random draw for the last 64 was made on 24 August.
Matches were best of seven frames.

==== September 26 morning session ====
- **Ali Carter** (ENG) **4**–0 Xu Si (CHN)
- **Yuan Sijun** (CHN) **4**–0 Ben Mertens (BEL)
- Thepchaiya Un-Nooh (THA) 1–**4** **Oliver Lines** (ENG)
- **Ma Hailong** (CHN) **4**–0 Mohamed Ibrahim (EGY)

==== September 26 afternoon session ====
- Lyu Haotian (CHN) 3–**4** **David Gilbert** (ENG)
- Noppon Saengkham (THA) 2–**4** **Fergal O'Brien** (IRL)
- Judd Trump (ENG) 3–**4** **Hammad Miah** (ENG)
- Oliver Brown (ENG) 2–**4** **Hossein Vafaei** (IRN)
- **Scott Donaldson** (SCO) **4**–0 Liam Graham (SCO)
- **Mark Williams** (WAL) **4**–2 Stephen Maguire (SCO)
- Jamie Jones (WAL) 0–**4** **Julien Leclercq** (BEL)
- Neil Robertson (AUS) 1–**4** **Si Jiahui** (CHN)

==== September 26 evening session ====
- Robert Milkins (ENG) 1–**4** **Barry Hawkins** (ENG)
- Ken Doherty (IRL) 3–**4** **Matthew Stevens** (WAL)
- Andy Hicks (ENG) 2–**4** **Graeme Dott** (SCO)
- **Jimmy Robertson** (ENG) **4**–3 Wu Yize (CHN)
- **Rod Lawler** (ENG) **4**–1 Dominic Dale (WAL)
- Anthony Hamilton (ENG) 0–**4** **Xiao Guodong** (CHN)
- **Gary Wilson** (ENG) **4**–3 Chris Wakelin (ENG)
- **Jack Lisowski** (ENG) **4**–3 Shaun Murphy (ENG)

==== September 27 morning session ====
- **Fan Zhengyi** (CHN) **4**–1 Ross Muir (SCO)
- **He Guoqiang** (CHN) **4**–1 Muhammad Asif (PAK)
- **Ryan Day** (WAL) **4**–1 Rory Thor (MAS)
- **Ding Junhui** (CHN) **4**–3 Liu Hongyu (CHN)

==== September 27 afternoon session ====
- Daniel Wells (WAL) 2–**4** **Ashley Carty** (ENG)
- **Matthew Selt** (ENG) **4**–1 Zak Surety (ENG)
- John Higgins (SCO) 1–**4** **Robbie Williams** (ENG)
- **Mark Selby** (ENG) **4**–2 Tian Pengfei (CHN)
- **Tom Ford** (ENG) **4**–3 Ashley Hugill (ENG)
- David Grace (ENG) 3–**4** **Sanderson Lam** (ENG)
- **Kyren Wilson** (ENG) **4**–0 Mark Allen (NIR)
- **Ishpreet Singh Chadha** (IND) **4**–2 Stuart Bingham (ENG)

=== Round 2 ===
The random draw for the last 32 was made on 26 September.
Matches were best of seven frames.

==== September 27 evening session ====
- Gary Wilson (ENG) 2–**4** **Mark Williams** (WAL)
- Yuan Sijun (CHN) 2–**4** **Hossein Vafaei** (IRN)
- Matthew Stevens (WAL) 3–**4** **Fergal O'Brien** (IRL)
- **Ma Hailong** (CHN) **4**–3 Hammad Miah (ENG)
- Ryan Day (WAL) 2–**4** **Ali Carter** (ENG)
- **Ding Junhui** (CHN) **4**–0 Julien Leclercq (BEL)
- Oliver Lines (ENG) 1–**4** **He Guoqiang** (CHN)
- **Graeme Dott** (SCO) **4**–0 Ashley Carty (ENG)

==== September 28 afternoon session ====
- **Barry Hawkins** (ENG) **4**–1 Kyren Wilson (ENG)
- Robbie Williams (ENG) 1–**4** **Scott Donaldson** (SCO)
- **David Gilbert** (ENG) **4**–1 Ishpreet Singh Chadha (IND)
- **Xiao Guodong** (CHN) **4**–1 Sanderson Lam (ENG)
- **Jack Lisowski** (ENG) **4**–2 Matthew Selt (ENG)
- Si Jiahui (CHN) 1–**4** **Mark Selby** (ENG)
- **Fan Zhengyi** (CHN) **4**–2 Rod Lawler (ENG)
- **Tom Ford** (ENG) **4**–0 Jimmy Robertson (ENG)

=== Round 3 ===
The random draw for the last 16 was made on 27 September.
Matches were best of seven frames.

==== September 28 evening session ====
- Ding Junhui (CHN) 2–**4** **Mark Williams** (WAL)
- Ali Carter (ENG) 2–**4** **Xiao Guodong** (CHN)
- Graeme Dott (SCO) 2–**4** **Hossein Vafaei** (IRN)
- **Tom Ford** (ENG) **4**–1 Scott Donaldson (SCO)
- Barry Hawkins (ENG) 3–**4** **He Guoqiang** (CHN)
- David Gilbert (ENG) 3–**4** **Mark Selby** (ENG)
- **Jack Lisowski** (ENG) **4**–2 Fergal O'Brien (IRL)
- Ma Hailong (CHN) 1–**4** **Fan Zhengyi** (CHN)

=== Quarter-finals ===
The random draw for the quarter-finals was made on 28 September.
Matches were best of nine frames.

==== September 29 afternoon session ====
- He Guoqiang (CHN) 2–**5** **Hossein Vafaei** (IRN)
- **Mark Williams** (WAL) **5**–1 Fan Zhengyi (CHN)

==== September 29 evening session ====
- **Mark Selby** (ENG) **5**–4 Jack Lisowski (ENG)
- Tom Ford (ENG) 3–**5** **Xiao Guodong** (CHN)

=== Semi-finals ===
The random draw for the semi-finals was made on 28 September.
Matches were best of eleven frames.

==== September 30 afternoon session ====
- Hossein Vafaei (IRN) 3–**6** **Mark Williams** (WAL)

==== September 30 evening session ====
- Xiao Guodong (CHN) 0–**6** **Mark Selby** (ENG)

=== Final ===
Final: Best of 19 frames. Referee: Tatiana Woollaston; The Centaur, Cheltenham, England, 1 October 2023
**Mark Williams**; Wales	**10**–7	Mark Selby; England
Afternoon: **66**–59, **131**–4 (110), **100**–5, 30–**102**, **74**–39, **133**–0 (133), 6–**121**, 0–**79**; Evening: 6–**112** (112), **66**–1, 30–**73**, **97**–51, **91**–0, 36–**82**, 0–**81**, **69**–56, **59**–54
(frame 6) **133**	Highest break	112 (frame 9)
**2**	Century breaks	1

== Qualifying ==
The qualification matches are shown below. Match winners are shown in bold.

=== Cheltenham ===
The results of the held over matches played in Cheltenham on 25 September were as follows:

==== Afternoon session ====
- **Ding Junhui** (CHN) **4**–3 Luca Brecel (BEL)
- Anton Kazakov (UKR) 2–**4** **Judd Trump** (ENG)
- Jiang Jun (CHN) 2–**4** **Robert Milkins** (ENG)
- **Ali Carter** (ENG) **4**–3 Allan Taylor (ENG)
- **Mark Allen** (NIR) **4**–1 Anthony McGill (SCO)
- Jamie Clarke (WAL) 1–**4** **Neil Robertson** (AUS)
- Peng Yisong (CHN) 1–**4** **Mark Williams** (WAL)
- **Gary Wilson** (ENG) **4**–1 Ahmed Aly Elsayed (USA)

==== Evening session ====
- Sean O'Sullivan (ENG) 0–**4** **Ryan Day** (WAL)
- Ben Woollaston (ENG) 2–**4** **Mark Selby** (ENG)
- **Kyren Wilson** (ENG) **4**–1 Martin O'Donnell (ENG)
- Stan Moody (ENG) 0–**4** **Barry Hawkins** (ENG)
- Joe O'Connor (ENG) 3–**4** **Jack Lisowski** (ENG)
- **Shaun Murphy** (ENG) **4**–1 Rebecca Kenna (ENG)
- **John Higgins** (SCO) **4**–1 Long Zehuang (CHN)
- Steven Hallworth (ENG) (Note: Steven Hallworth replaced Ronnie O'Sullivan who withdrew.) 0–**4** **Jimmy Robertson** (ENG)

=== Leicester ===
The results of the qualifying matches played in Leicester were as follows:

==== 14 August ====
- Lukas Kleckers (GER) 1–**4** **Si Jiahui** (CHN)
- **Ma Hailong** (CHN) **4**–2 Ian Burns (ENG)
- M. Phetmalaikul (THA) 1–**4** **Ishpreet Singh Chadha** (IND)
- Stephen Hendry (SCO) 2–**4** **Muhammad Asif** (PAK)
- James Cahill (ENG) 1–**4** **Tom Ford** (ENG)
- Louis Heathcote (ENG) 2–**4** **Ben Mertens** (BEL)
- Alfie Burden (ENG) 2–**4** **Ken Doherty** (IRL)
- **Fergal O'Brien** (IRL) **4**–1 Andres Petrov (EST)

==== 15 August ====
- **Hammad Miah** (ENG) **4**–3 Zhou Yuelong (CHN)
- **Robbie Williams** (ENG) **4**–0 Pang Junxu (CHN)
- **Oliver Brown** (ENG) **4**–3 Himanshu Jain (IND)
- **Xu Si** (CHN) **4**–0 Ricky Walden (ENG)
- **Dominic Dale** (WAL) **4**–1 Mark Joyce (ENG)
- Liam Pullen (ENG) 0–**4** **Oliver Lines** (ENG)
- Jenson Kendrick (ENG) 1–**4** **David Grace** (ENG)
- Adam Duffy (ENG) 1–**4** **Scott Donaldson** (SCO)

==== 16 August ====
- **Graeme Dott** (SCO) **4**–3 Zhang Anda (CHN)
- Baipat Siripaporn (THA) 1–**4** **Liu Hongyu** (CHN)
- Rory McLeod (JAM) (Note: Rory McLeod replaced Asjad Iqbal who withdrew.) 1–**4** **Tian Pengfei** (CHN)
- Dylan Emery (WAL) 1–**4** **Yuan Sijun** (CHN)
- Andrew Higginson (ENG) 1–**4** **Andy Hicks** (ENG)
- **Chris Wakelin** (ENG) **4**–3 Andrew Pagett (WAL)
- **Rod Lawler** (ENG) **4**–2 Sam Craigie (ENG)
- **Anthony Hamilton** (ENG) **4**–1 Aaron Hill (IRL)

==== 17 August ====
- **Mohamed Ibrahim** (EGY) **4**–3 Mink Nutcharut (THA)
- **Liam Graham** (SCO) **4**–3 Cao Yupeng (CHN)
- Andy Lee (HKG) 1–**4** **Hossein Vafaei** (IRN)
- Elliot Slessor (ENG) 2–**4** **He Guoqiang** (CHN)
- **David Gilbert** (ENG) **4**–1 Ryan Thomerson (AUS)
- Jackson Page (WAL) 2–**4** **Ashley Carty** (ENG)
- Stuart Carrington (ENG) 3–**4** **Ross Muir** (SCO)
- **Ashley Hugill** (ENG) **4**–2 Jak Jones (WAL)

==== 18 August ====
- David Lilley (ENG) 1–**4** **Lyu Haotian** (CHN)
- **Rory Thor** (MAS) **4**–1 Alexander Ursenbacher (SUI)
- **Wu Yize** (CHN) **4**–2 Martin Gould (ENG)
- **Noppon Saengkham** (THA) **4**–1 Xing Zihao (CHN)
- Victor Sarkis (BRA) 0–**4** **Matthew Stevens** (WAL)
- Jordan Brown (NIR) 3–**4** **Daniel Wells** (WAL)
- Joe Perry (ENG) 2–**4** **Sanderson Lam** (ENG)
- Michael White (WAL) 2–**4** **Zak Surety** (ENG)

==== 19 August ====
- **Thepchaiya Un-Nooh** (THA) **4**–0 Reanne Evans (ENG)
- Mark Davis (ENG) 3–**4** **Fan Zhengyi** (CHN)
- **Xiao Guodong** (CHN) **4**–2 Marco Fu (HKG)
- **Jamie Jones** (WAL) **4**–0 Mostafa Dorgham (EGY)
- **Stuart Bingham** (ENG) **4**–0 John Astley (ENG)
- **Matthew Selt** (ENG) **4**–0 Liam Highfield (ENG)
- **Julien Leclercq** (BEL) **4**–2 Dean Young (SCO)
- **Stephen Maguire** (SCO) **4**–0 Jimmy White (ENG)

== Century breaks ==
=== Main stage centuries ===
A total of 51 century breaks were made during the main stage of the tournament in Cheltenham.

- 140 – Xiao Guodong
- 138, 133, 128, 110, 109 – Mark Williams
- 135, 134, 125, 120, 116, 107, 106 – Hossein Vafaei
- 133, 132, 108, 102, 101, 100 – Jack Lisowski
- 132, 123, 112, 110 – Mark Selby
- 126, 101 – Hammad Miah
- 125, 124, 116 – Judd Trump
- 125 – Graeme Dott
- 123, 109 – He Guoqiang
- 123 – Ding Junhui
- 121, 112, 104 – Kyren Wilson
- 118 – Robbie Williams
- 117 – Liu Hongyu
- 116 – John Higgins
- 114 – Barry Hawkins
- 111, 111 – Shaun Murphy
- 111 – Zak Surety
- 107 – Si Jiahui
- 107 – Ali Carter
- 105 – Long Zehuang
- 105 – Joe O'Connor
- 105 – David Gilbert
- 104 – Wu Yize
- 103 – Oliver Lines
- 102 – Tian Pengfei
- 100 – Jimmy Robertson

=== Qualifying stage centuries ===
A total of 11 century breaks were made during the qualifying stage in Leicester.

- 136, 115 – Daniel Wells
- 135 – Stephen Maguire
- 134 – Robbie Williams
- 129, 119 – Zhang Anda
- 122 – Julien Leclercq
- 114 – Martin Gould
- 105 – Zhou Yuelong
- 101 – Ben Mertens
- 101 – Rory Thor
