= 2023 English Open (snooker) =

Snooker tournament

2023 BetVictor English Open

Tournament information
- Dates: 2–8 October 2023
- Venue: Brentwood Centre
- City: Brentwood
- Country: England
- Organisation: World Snooker Tour
- Format: Ranking event
- Total prize fund: £427,000
- Winner's share: £80,000
- Highest break: John Higgins (SCO) (145)

Final
- Champion: Judd Trump (ENG)
- Runner-up: Zhang Anda (CHN)
- Score: 9–7

The 2023 English Open (officially the 2023 BetVictor English Open) was a professional snooker tournament that took place from 2 to 8 October 2023 at the Brentwood Centre in Brentwood, England. Qualifiers took place from 6 to 8 September at the Morningside Arena in Leicester, although matches involving the top 16 players in the world rankings were held over and played at the final venue. It was the fourth ranking event of the 2023–24 season (following the 2023 British Open and preceding the 2023 Wuhan Open), the first of four tournaments in the season's Home Nations Series (preceding the 2023 Northern Ireland Open, the 2023 Scottish Open, and the 2024 Welsh Open), and the fifth of eight tournaments in the season's European Series. The event was broadcast by Eurosport and Discovery+ in Europe (including the UK) and by other broadcasters internationally. The winner received £80,000 from a total prize fund of £427,000, the Steve Davis trophy, and a place in the 2023 Champion of Champions invitational event.

Mark Selby was the defending champion, having defeated Luca Brecel 9–6 in the 2022 final, but he lost 2–4 to Martin O'Donnell in the last 64. Judd Trump won the event, coming from 1–5 and 3–7 behind in the final to defeat first-time ranking finalist Zhang Anda 9–7. It was Trump's second English Open title and his fifth Home Nations tournament win. It was the 24th ranking title of his career and his first win at a ranking event since claiming the 2022 Turkish Masters 19 months earlier.

The tournament produced 71 century breaks, with 57 made in Brentwood in addition to the 14 centuries made in the qualifying matches at Leicester. John Higgins made the tournament's highest break, a 145 in his last-16 match against Oliver Lines.

== Overview ==
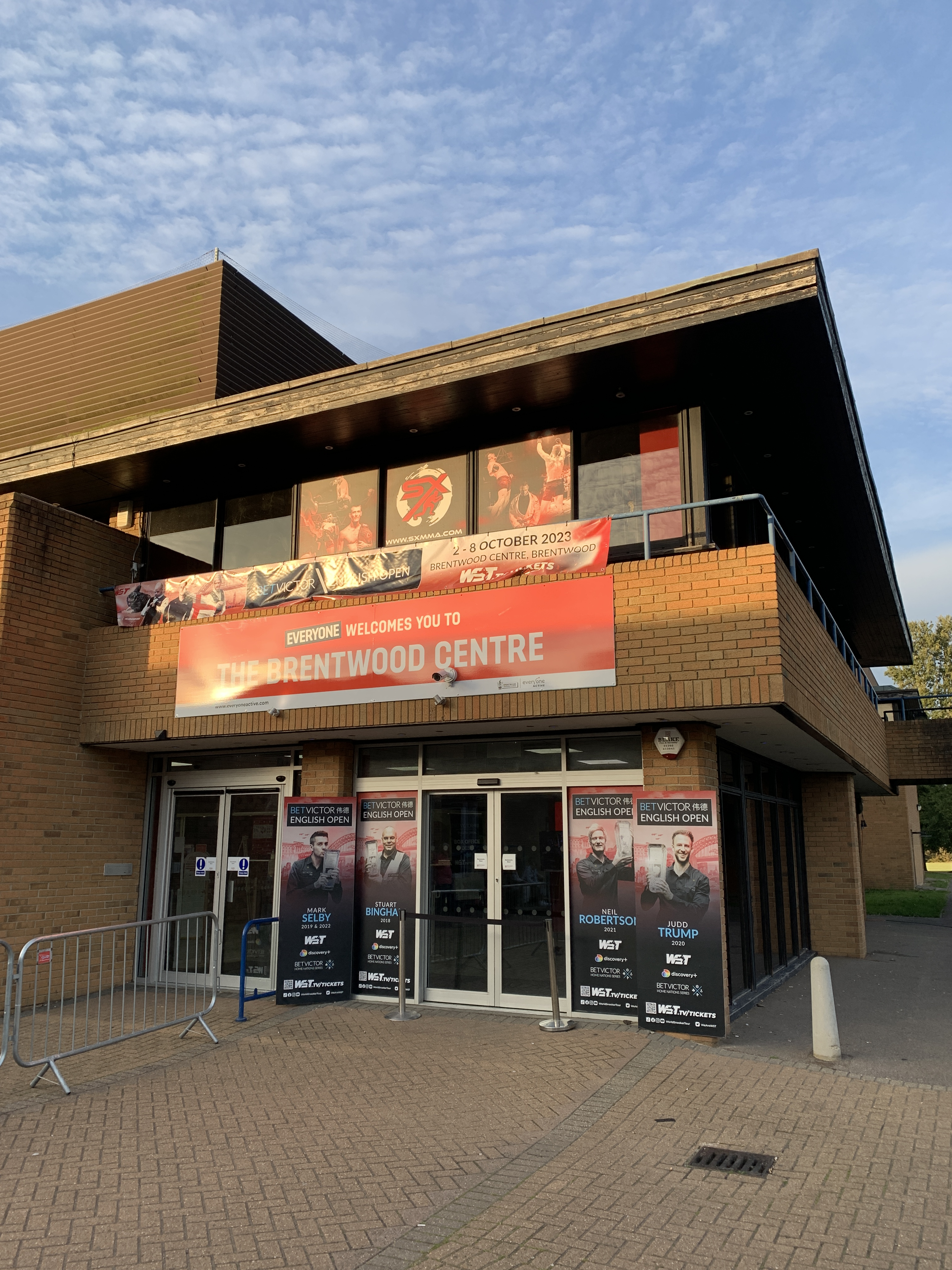
The Brentwood Centre during the tournament

The event took place from 2 to 8 October 2023 at the Brentwood Centre in Brentwood, England. The fourth ranking event of the 2023–24 season, following the 2023 British Open and preceding the 2023 Wuhan Open, it was the first of four tournaments in the season's Home Nations Series and the fifth of eight events in the season's European Series. Mark Selby was the defending champion, having defeated Luca Brecel 9–6 in the 2022 final.

=== Format ===
All matches were played as the best of 7 frames until the quarter-finals, which were the best of 9. The semi-finals were the best of 11, and the final was a best-of-17-frame match played over two sessions.

=== Broadcasters ===
The event was broadcast by Eurosport and Discovery+ in Europe (including the UK); by Liaoning TV, Migu, Youku, and Huya Live in China; by Now TV in Hong Kong; by Astro SuperSport in Malaysia and Brunei; by TrueVision in Thailand; by Premier Sports Network in the Philippines; and by Fastsports in Pakistan. It was available from Matchroom Sport in all other territories.

=== Prize fund ===
The tournament winner received the Steve Davis trophy. The breakdown of prize money for the event is shown below:

- Winner: £80,000
- Runner-up: £35,000
- Semi-final: £17,500
- Quarter-final: £11,000
- Last 16: £7,500
- Last 32: £4,500
- Last 64: £3,000
- Highest break: £5,000
- Total: £427,000

== Summary ==
=== Qualifying round ===
Qualifying for the event took place between 6 and 8 September at the Morningside Arena in Leicester, England. Top-32 players Stuart Bingham, Noppon Saengkham, and Joe Perry were beaten by Jenson Kendrick, Dylan Emery, and Mark Davis respectively, with Kendrick recording his first win on the professional tour. Eighteen-year-old Liam Pullen defeated Ahmed Aly Elsayed 4–0 to win his first match at a ranking event. Stephen Maguire made breaks of 130 and 131 as he came from behind three times to defeat Daniel Wells in a deciding frame.

The reigning Women's World Champion Baipat Siripaporn led Muhammad Asif 3–1. She had chances to win the match in the fifth and sixth frames, but Asif levelled the scores at 3–3 and then won the decider. Alexander Ursenbacher led 2023 World Championship semi-finalist Si Jiahui 3–1, but Si took three consecutive frames to win the match 4–3. Hossein Vafaei made breaks of 99, 81, 84, and 79 as he whitewashed Liam Graham.

James Cahill made the highest break in the Leicester qualifiers, a 140 in his match against Manasawin Phetmalaikul. This was also Cahill's highest break to date in professional competition. He won the match 4–2, making another century in the final frame. Matthew Selt defeated Alfie Burden 4–2. Burden lost the second frame on the three-miss-rule after Selt's break-off. Former world champions Stephen Hendry and Ken Doherty were whitewashed by Fergal O'Brien and Jackson Page respectively. Former World Seniors Champion David Lilley defeated Thepchaiya Un-Nooh 4–1. Allan Taylor came from 52 points behind in the deciding frame to defeat 2023 World Championship quarter-finalist Jak Jones 4–3.

=== Early rounds ===
==== Held-over qualifying matches ====
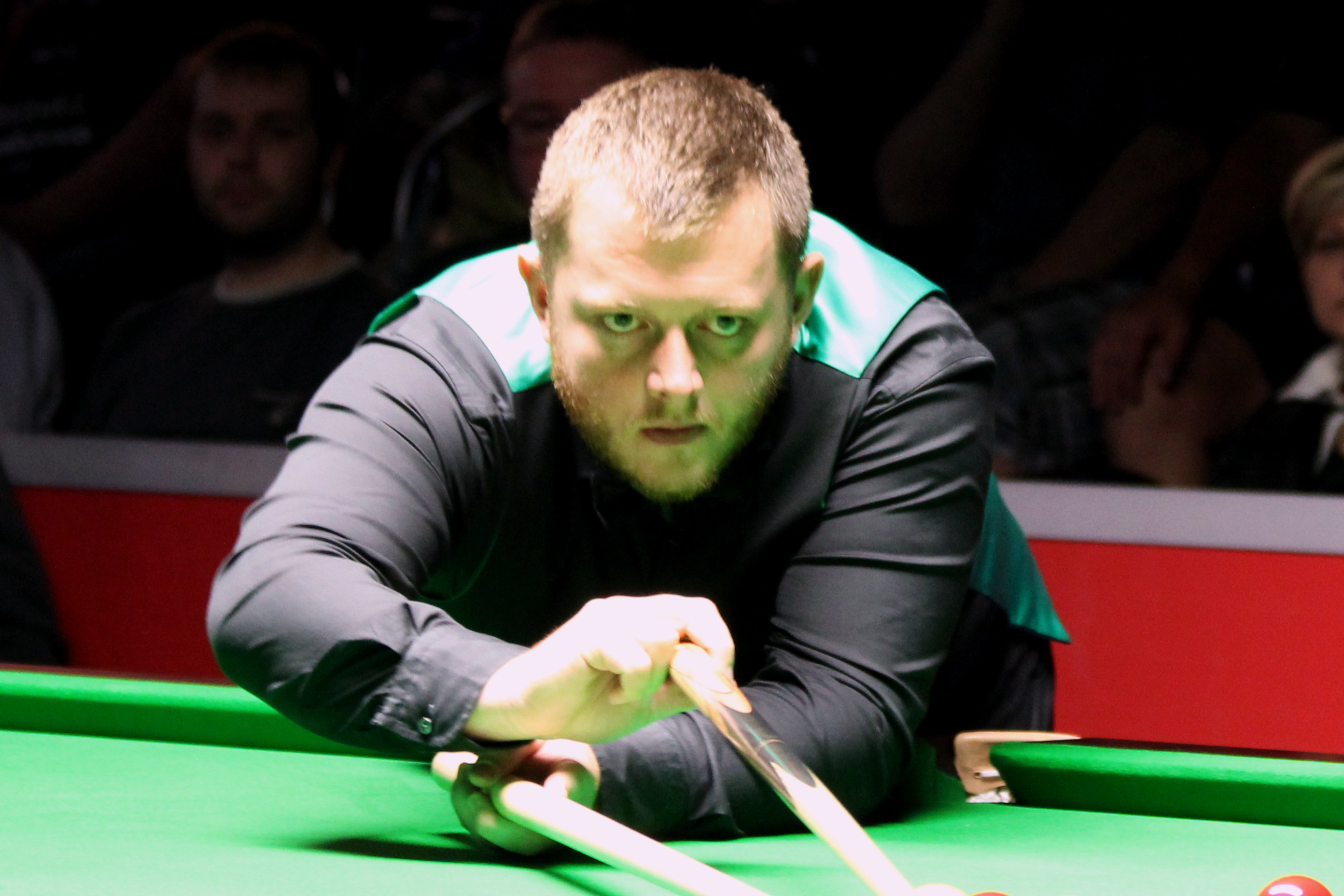
Mark Allen (pictured in 2016) became the second player, after Neil Robertson in 2013, to win a best-of-seven-frame professional match with four consecutive century breaks.

The held-over qualifiers were played on 2 October, although the matches featuring Mark Williams and Mark Selby—who had contested the 2023 British Open final on 1 October—were moved to 3 October to give the players time to travel and prepare. After winning the invitational 2023 Shanghai Masters two weeks previously, the world number one Ronnie O'Sullivan competed in his first ranking tournament of the season. He defeated Andrew Pagett 4–0, but stated that he was suffering from tennis elbow and had to take painkillers to play shots requiring cue power.

The world number 73 Sanderson Lam defeated the sixth seed Neil Robertson 4–2, meaning that Robertson had failed to progress beyond the last-64 stage of any ranking event in the season to date. John Higgins defeated Marco Fu, clinching the deciding frame on the colours after a safety battle on the green. Mark Allen made breaks of 104, 127, 114, and 104 as he whitewashed Mostafa Dorgham, becoming the second player, following Neil Robertson at the 2013 Ruhr Open, to win a best-of-seven-frame match with four consecutive centuries.

Ding Junhui appeared for his match against Ma Hailong wearing a brown suit with a bow tie and waistcoat, having forgotten that the Home Nations Series dress code stipulated a black shirt and black trousers. His friend purchased the required attire from a nearby Marks & Spencer, but Ding missed the match's scheduled start time and forfeited the opening frame. From 1–3 behind at the mid-session interval, Ding won three consecutive frames for a 4–3 victory. Stan Moody, who had turned 17 the previous month and was playing his first season on the professional tour, lost the first two frames against reigning World Champion Luca Brecel, but then won three consecutive frames to lead 3–2. Moody made a 121 break in frame four, the highest of his professional career to date. He had an opportunity to win the match in the sixth frame but missed a red while on a break of 30, and Brecel tied the scores at 3–3. Brecel won the 36-minute deciding frame on the pink.

Liu Hongyu, also playing his first season on the tour, came from 1–3 behind to defeat seventh seed Shaun Murphy 4–3, despite having trailed by 57 points in the decider. Selt defeated Michael White 4–3 in a match that produced two centuries and five more half-centuries. Judd Trump whitewashed Sean O'Sullivan, making a highest break of 102. The eighth seed Kyren Wilson lost to Oliver Lines in a deciding frame. Williams whitewashed Ian Burns in 49 minutes, making a century and three more breaks over 60. Selby advanced with a 4–1 win over Xing Zihao, making a highest break of 127.

==== Last 64 ====
The round of 64 was played on 3 and 4 October. Brecel attempted a maximum break in the opening frame of his match against Andy Hicks. He potted 15 reds and 15 blacks, but went in-off after potting the last yellow, ending the break on 120. Brecel went on to win the match 4–1. Trump defeated Scott Donaldson by the same score, making a 140 break in the third frame. Vafaei made a 76 break to win the deciding frame against Julien Leclercq. The defending champion Selby, playing his ninth match in nine days, lost 2–4 to the world number 104 Martin O'Donnell. It was the first time O'Donnell had beaten Selby in a professional match, having lost all six of their previous encounters. Lines beat Martin Gould 4–1, and Allen defeated Wu Yize by the same score.

The 13th seed Barry Hawkins made a 134 break while playing Graeme Dott but lost the match 2–4. Trailing Adam Duffy 2–3, Robert Milkins made a 129 break in the sixth frame and a 64 in the decider to win 4–3. O'Sullivan defeated Page 4–1 in a match that produced four centuries, three by O'Sullivan and one by Page. Afterwards, O'Sullivan described Page as "a fantastic talent who will win tournaments". Si, a 2023 World Championship semi-finalist, whitewashed O'Brien. Williams made a 123 break in the opening frame against Xiao Guodong, but Xiao won the next three. However, Williams made breaks of 65, a second 123, and 73 to win 4–3. Liu progressed with a 4–1 win over Joe O'Connor, while Muhammad Asif recovered from 2–3 behind to defeat Fan Zhengyi 4–3, winning the decider on the colours. Elliot Slessor trailed the 14th seed Jack Lisowski 1–2 but won three of the last four frames for a 4–3 victory.

==== Last 32 ====
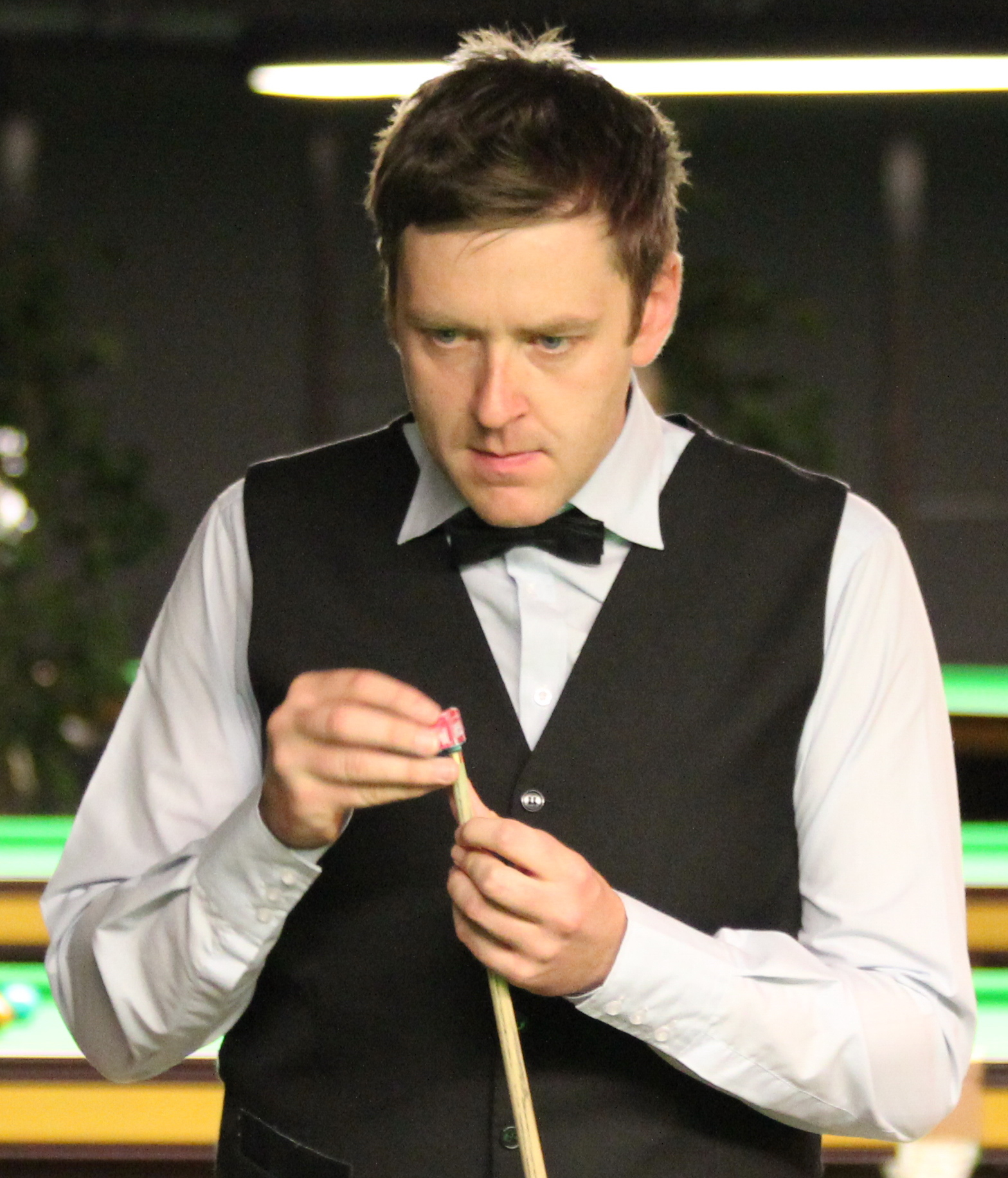
Ricky Walden (pictured in 2012) trailed 0–3 and was 70 points behind in frame four, but recovered to defeat Graeme Dott 4–3 in the last 32.

The round of 32 was played on 4 and 5 October. Dott won the first three frames against Ricky Walden and took a 70-point lead in the fourth to leave Walden requiring a snooker. However, Walden obtained the foul points he needed after snookering Dott on the pink and then potted pink and black to win the frame. Walden won frame five, made a 134 break to take the sixth, and won the deciding frame on the last pink for a 4–3 victory. Walden later described the win as the best comeback of his career. Trump came from 2–3 behind to defeat Jimmy Robertson in a deciding frame, while He Guoqiang defeated Vafaei, also in a deciding frame. Higgins advanced with a whitewash of Davis, who scored only seven points in the match. The 12th seed Milkins lost 1–4 to Yuan Sijun. Selt lost the first two frames against the fourth seed Allen, but then won four consecutive frames with breaks including 79, 114, and 72 for a 4–2 victory.

Brecel advanced with a 4–0 whitewash over Asif. O'Sullivan played Si, who made a 101 break in the first frame and took a 2–1 lead. O'Sullivan won the next three frames for a 4–2 victory, making his highest break of 78 in the final frame, but afterwards called his performance "awful". Ali Carter and Zhou Yuelong progressed with whitewash victories over Kendrick and Lam respectively. Zhang Anda defeated Slessor 4–1, while Ding secured a 4–2 victory over Gary Wilson. Williams made breaks of 111 and 81 as he defeated Emery 4–2, his 11th consecutive professional victory. Liu recovered from 1–3 behind to defeat Chris Wakelin in a deciding frame.

==== Last 16 ====
The round of 16 was played on 5 October. Facing Ding, Brecel won the first two frames, but Ding then won three consecutive frames to lead 3–2. Brecel forced a decider, but Ding clinched a 4–3 win with a 58 break. O'Sullivan led Zhang 2–1, but Zhang responded with breaks of 97, 50, and 116 to win 4–2. Disturbed by people moving in the crowd, O'Sullivan complained to referee Ben Williams that it felt as if a sponsored walk was taking place at the venue. He bit the tip off his cue at the end of the match and left it on the floor of the arena. The losses by both Brecel and O'Sullivan at the last-16 stage meant that O'Sullivan retained the world number one position following the tournament. Higgins defeated Lines 4–1, making the tournament's highest break of 145 in the opening frame and following it with breaks of 71, 91, and 132.

Walden lost the first two frames against Selt but then won three in a row to lead 3–2. However, Selt took frame six on the colours and then won the decider. Trump recovered from 1–2 behind to defeat Yuan 4–2, while O'Donnell defeated He by the same score to reach the sixth ranking quarter-final of his career. Williams's 11-match winning streak ended when he lost 3–4 to Liu in a match that started after 23:00 BST and finished shortly before 01:30 BST on 6 October. Williams complained on social media about the match's late start time, calling it "crazy" and asking how players could be expected to perform well at that hour.

=== Later rounds ===
==== Quarter-finals ====
The quarter-finals were played on 6 October as the best of nine frames. All quarter-finalists in the bottom half of the draw were Chinese players. Trump won the 30-minute first frame against Selt, but his opponent tied the scores at 1–1. Trump then won four consecutive frames, making a 137 total clearance in frame four and adding a second century of 103 in the final frame, for a 5–1 victory. Higgins made five half-century breaks as he defeated O'Donnell, also by a 5–1 scoreline. Liu won the first three frames against 15th seed Ding, and led 3–1 and 4–2. In the seventh frame, Ding had a 56-point lead, but twice missed pots that would have left Liu requiring snookers. Liu made a 57 clearance to win the match 5–2 and reach his first ranking semi-final. Zhang played Zhou in a match that produced two centuries (both by Zhou) and six other half-centuries. Zhang clinched a 5–4 victory with an 80 break in the deciding frame. He reached the first ranking semi-final of his 14-year professional career.

==== Semi-finals ====
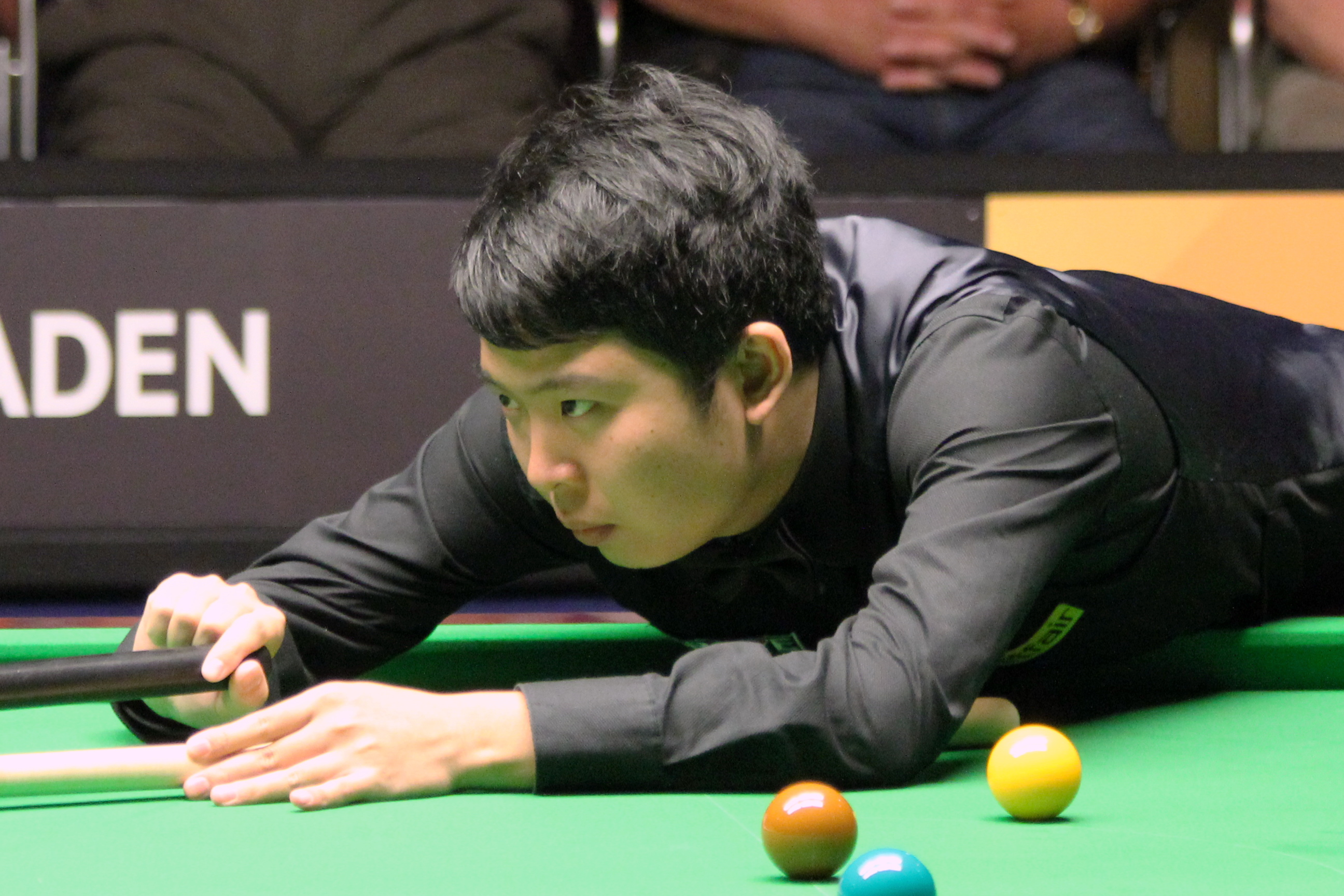
Zhang Anda (pictured in 2012) defeated fellow Chinese player Liu Hongyu in the semi-finals to reach the first ranking final of his 14-year professional career.

The semi-finals were played on 7 October as the best of 11 frames. Higgins competed in his 82nd ranking semi-final, while Trump contested his 55th. Higgins won the opening frame with a 124 break, but Trump won the second on the colours after Higgins made a safety error on the blue. Higgins made breaks of 53 and 137 to lead 3–1 at the mid-session interval. After the break, Higgins won frame five, Trump won the sixth after fluking the brown while escaping from a snooker, and Higgins went 5–2 ahead after winning frame seven with a 77 break. Higgins had a chance to clinch the match in frame eight, but missed the yellow to a baulk pocket and Trump cleared to the pink. Trump then made breaks of 88 and 111 to tie the scores at 5–5 and force a decider, which he won with a break of 68. "Early in the game I was tense and trying too hard, then from 5–2 I changed my mindset and relaxed", Trump commented. He also stated that support from the crowd when he was 4–5 behind "inspired me to put on a show for them".

In the other semi-final, Zhang played Liu. Zhang trailed by 46 points in the opening frame, but won it with a 59 clearance. He also won the next three frames to go 4–0 ahead at the mid-session interval. Liu won frame five after Zhang missed a pot on the last red, but Zhang made a 52 break in the sixth to go 5–1 ahead. Liu made a 68 break to win the seventh, but Zhang clinched a 6–2 win with breaks of 31 and 46 in frame eight. "I'm not feeling surprised, this wasn't unexpected for me", commented Zhang about reaching the final. He added: "This is what I have been trying to achieve for years and I've put in a lot of effort".

==== Final ====
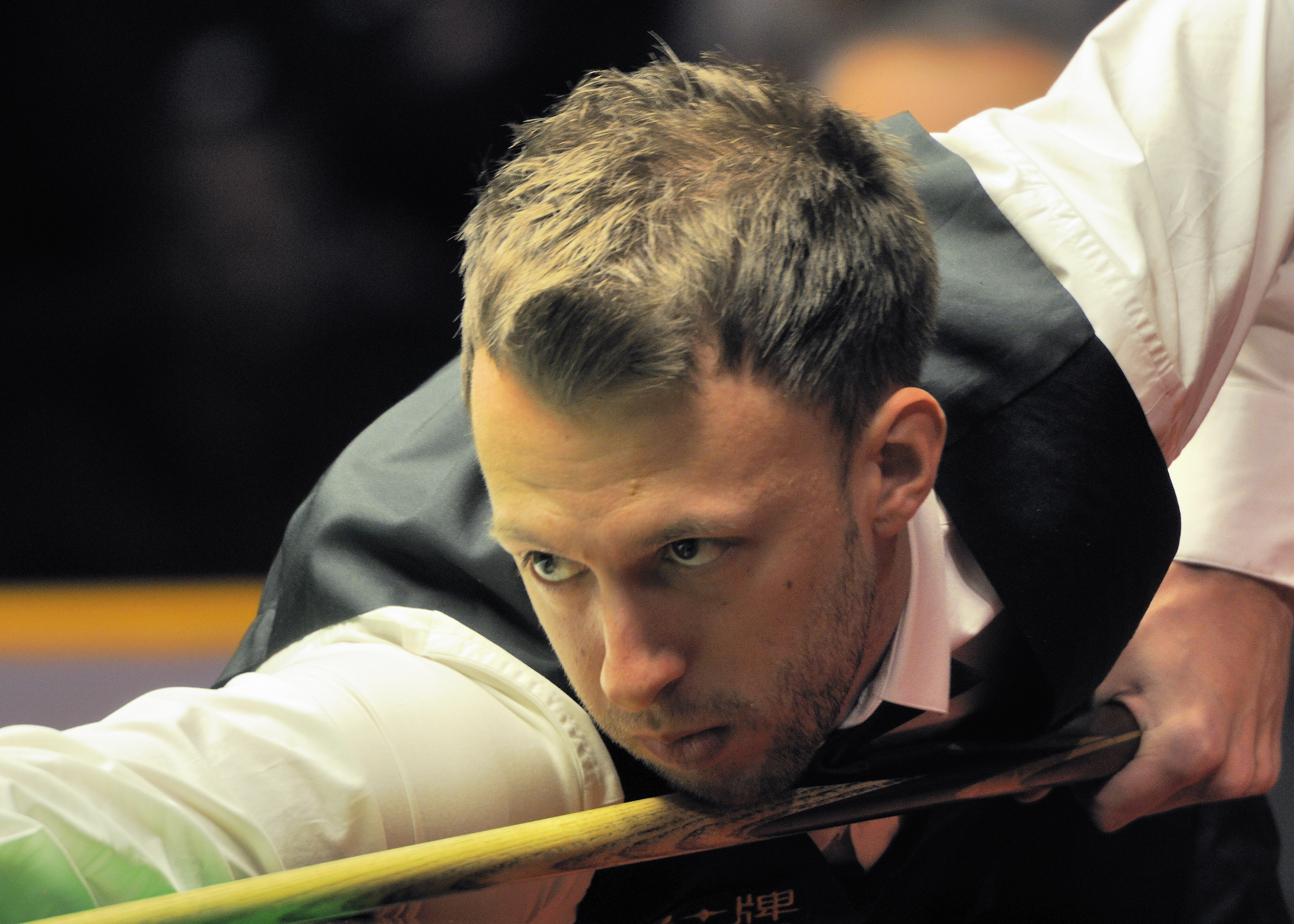
Judd Trump (pictured in 2014) won the English Open for the second time. It was the 24th ranking title of his career and his first in 19 months.

The final took place on 8 October, played as the best of 17 frames over two sessions, between the fifth seed Trump and the world number 57 Zhang. Zhang was competing in his first ranking final, while Trump was contesting his 39th. The first two frames were shared, but Trump scored just one point in the next three frames as Zhang made breaks including 85 and 128 to lead 4–1. Trump miscued in the sixth frame while attempting a pot on a red, and Zhang extended his lead to 5–1. However, Trump won the last two frames of the session with breaks of 56 and 120, reducing Zhang's lead to two frames at 5–3. Between sessions, Trump had tournament director Paul Collier replace his cue tip and remained at the venue practicing with it rather than returning to his hotel.

Zhang began the evening session with breaks of 109 and 98 to lead 7–3. He had a chance to win frame 11, but missed a pot on the blue to a middle pocket. Trump then took six consecutive frames, including a 135 total clearance in frame 12, to win the match 9–7 and secure his second English Open title, following his previous title in 2020. It was Trump's fifth win at a Home Nations Series event, his 24th ranking title, and his first win at a ranking event since the 2022 Turkish Masters 19 months previously. "I was up against it the whole day", commented Trump afterwards. "In the end I managed to find some momentum and clawed it back. Zhang played well until 7–3 and put me under a lot of pressure. It was only when he missed a couple that I started to turn it around". "When I was 7–3 up I missed a blue in the middle pocket and Judd came back like a monster", said Zhang. Trump moved from fifth to fourth in the rankings after the event. Zhang's runner-up prize of £35,000 was the biggest of his career to date and enabled him to advance from 57th to 40th place in the world rankings.

== Main draw ==
The draw for the tournament is shown below. Numbers in parentheses after the players' names denote the top 32 seeded players, whilst players in bold denote match winners.

=== Top half ===
**Last 64**; Best of 7 frames
Mark Selby (ENG) (1)	2
**Martin O'Donnell (ENG)**	**4**
**Stephen Maguire (SCO) (32)**	**4**
Louis Heathcote (ENG)	2
Ryan Day (WAL) (16)	3
**He Guoqiang (CHN)**	**4**
**Hossein Vafaei (IRN) (17)**	**4**
Julien Leclercq (BEL)	3
David Lilley (ENG)	2
**Mark Davis (ENG)**	**4**
James Cahill (ENG)	2
**John Higgins (SCO) (9)**	**4**
**Cao Yupeng (CHN)**	**4**
David Gilbert (ENG) (25)	0
Martin Gould (ENG)	1
**Oliver Lines (ENG)**	**4**
**Judd Trump (ENG) (5)**	**4**
Scott Donaldson (SCO)	1
**Jimmy Robertson (ENG) (28)**	**4**
Allan Taylor (ENG)	3
**Robert Milkins (ENG) (12)**	**4**
Adam Duffy (ENG)	3
Tom Ford (ENG) (21)	2
**Yuan Sijun (CHN)**	**4**
Hammad Miah (ENG)	2
**Ricky Walden (ENG) (20)**	**4**
**Graeme Dott (SCO)**	**4**
Barry Hawkins (ENG) (13)	2
Michael White (WAL)	3
**Matthew Selt (ENG) (29)**	**4**
Wu Yize (CHN)	1
**Mark Allen (NIR) (4)**	**4**

**Last 32**; Best of 7 frames
**Martin O'Donnell (ENG)**	**4**
Stephen Maguire (SCO) (32)	1
**He Guoqiang (CHN)**	**4**
Hossein Vafaei (IRN) (17)	3
Mark Davis (ENG)	0
**John Higgins (SCO) (9)**	**4**
Cao Yupeng (CHN)	2
**Oliver Lines (ENG)**	**4**
**Judd Trump (ENG) (5)**	**4**
Jimmy Robertson (ENG) (28)	3
Robert Milkins (ENG) (12)	1
**Yuan Sijun (CHN)**	**4**
**Ricky Walden (ENG) (20)**	**4**
Graeme Dott (SCO)	3
**Matthew Selt (ENG) (29)**	**4**
Mark Allen (NIR) (4)	2

**Last 16**; Best of 7 frames
**Martin O'Donnell (ENG)**	**4**
He Guoqiang (CHN)	2
**John Higgins (SCO) (9)**	**4**
Oliver Lines (ENG)	1
**Judd Trump (ENG) (5)**	**4**
Yuan Sijun (CHN)	2
Ricky Walden (ENG) (20)	3
**Matthew Selt (ENG) (29)**	**4**

**Quarter-finals**; Best of 9 frames
Martin O'Donnell (ENG)	1
**John Higgins (SCO) (9)**	**5**
**Judd Trump (ENG) (5)**	**5**
Matthew Selt (ENG) (29)	1

**Semi-finals**; Best of 11 frames
John Higgins (SCO) (9)	5
**Judd Trump (ENG) (5)**	**6**

=== Bottom half ===
**Last 64**; Best of 7 frames
**Ronnie O'Sullivan (ENG) (3)**	**4**
Jackson Page (WAL)	1
**Si Jiahui (CHN) (30)**	**4**
Fergal O'Brien (IRL)	0
Jack Lisowski (ENG) (14)	3
**Elliot Slessor (ENG)**	**4**
Anthony McGill (SCO) (19)	1
**Zhang Anda (CHN)**	**4**
Lukas Kleckers (GER)	1
**Jenson Kendrick (ENG)**	**4**
Liam Pullen (ENG)	0
**Ali Carter (ENG) (11)**	**4**
Andrew Higginson (ENG)	2
**Zhou Yuelong (CHN) (27)**	**4**
Stuart Carrington (ENG)	0
**Sanderson Lam (ENG)**	**4**
**Liu Hongyu (CHN)**	**4**
Joe O'Connor (ENG)	1
**Chris Wakelin (ENG) (26)**	**4**
Jamie Jones (WAL)	1
**Mark Williams (WAL) (10)**	**4**
Xiao Guodong (CHN)	3
**Dylan Emery (WAL)**	**4**
Oliver Brown (ENG)	1
Dominic Dale (WAL)	3
**Gary Wilson (ENG) (18)**	**4**
David Grace (ENG)	1
**Ding Junhui (CHN) (15)**	**4**
**Muhammad Asif (PAK)**	**4**
Fan Zhengyi (CHN) (31)	3
Andy Hicks (ENG)	1
**Luca Brecel (BEL) (2)**	**4**

**Last 32**; Best of 7 frames
**Ronnie O'Sullivan (ENG) (3)**	**4**
Si Jiahui (CHN) (30)	2
Elliot Slessor (ENG)	1
**Zhang Anda (CHN)**	**4**
Jenson Kendrick (ENG)	0
**Ali Carter (ENG) (11)**	**4**
**Zhou Yuelong (CHN) (27)**	**4**
Sanderson Lam (ENG)	0
**Liu Hongyu (CHN)**	**4**
Chris Wakelin (ENG) (26)	3
**Mark Williams (WAL) (10)**	**4**
Dylan Emery (WAL)	2
Gary Wilson (ENG) (18)	2
**Ding Junhui (CHN) (15)**	**4**
Muhammad Asif (PAK)	0
**Luca Brecel (BEL) (2)**	**4**

**Last 16**; Best of 7 frames
Ronnie O'Sullivan (ENG) (3)	2
**Zhang Anda (CHN)**	**4**
Ali Carter (ENG) (11)	1
**Zhou Yuelong (CHN) (27)**	**4**
**Liu Hongyu (CHN)**	**4**
Mark Williams (WAL) (10)	3
**Ding Junhui (CHN) (15)**	**4**
Luca Brecel (BEL) (2)	3

**Quarter-finals**; Best of 9 frames
**Zhang Anda (CHN)**	**5**
Zhou Yuelong (CHN) (27)	4
**Liu Hongyu (CHN)**	**5**
Ding Junhui (CHN) (15)	2

**Semi-finals**; Best of 11 frames
**Zhang Anda (CHN)**	**6**
Liu Hongyu (CHN)	2

=== Final: frame scores ===
Final: Best of 17 frames. Referee: Ben Williams; Brentwood Centre, Brentwood, England, 8 October 2023
**Judd Trump** (5); England	**9**–7	Zhang Anda; China
Afternoon: 15–**67**, **72**–48, 0–**85**, 1–**65**, 0–**128** (128), 12–**90**, **70**–4, **120**–0 (120); Evening: 12–**125** (109), 0–**98**, **68**–26, **135**–0 (135), **83**–29, **78**–0, **59**–0, **119**–8
(frame 12) **135**	Highest break	128 (frame 5)
2	Century breaks	2

== Qualifying ==
Qualification for the tournament took place from 6 to 8 September at the Morningside Arena in Leicester, although matches involving the top 16 players in the world rankings were held over to be played at the final venue. Numbers in parentheses after the players' names denote the top 32 seeded players, whilst players in bold denote match winners.

=== Brentwood ===
One pre-qualifying match between two English wildcards was played in Brentwood on 2 October. Result as follows:

- **Ryan Davies** (ENG) **4**–2 Bradley Cowdroy (ENG)

The results of the held-over matches played in Brentwood on 2 October were as follows:

- **Mark Allen** (NIR) (4) **4**–0 Mostafa Dorgham (EGY)
- **Ding Junhui** (CHN) (15) **4**–3 Ma Hailong (CHN)
- **Ryan Day** (WAL) (16) **4**–2 Ashley Hugill (ENG)
- **Robert Milkins** (ENG) (12) **4**–1 Robbie Williams (ENG)
- **Ronnie O'Sullivan** (ENG) (3) **4**–0 Andrew Pagett (WAL)
- **John Higgins** (SCO) (9) **4**–3 Marco Fu (HKG)
- **Jack Lisowski** (ENG) (14) **4**–1 Matthew Stevens (WAL)
- Neil Robertson (AUS) (6) 2–**4** **Sanderson Lam** (ENG)
- **Ali Carter** (ENG) (11) **4**–1 Jamie Clarke (WAL)
- **Luca Brecel** (BEL) (2) **4**–3 Stan Moody (ENG)
- Shaun Murphy (ENG) (7) 3–**4** **Liu Hongyu** (CHN)
- **Judd Trump** (ENG) (5) **4**–0 Sean O'Sullivan (ENG)
- Kyren Wilson (ENG) (8) 3–**4** **Oliver Lines** (ENG)
- **Barry Hawkins** (ENG) (13) **4**–1 Anthony Hamilton (ENG)

Three held over matches were played on 3 October, two of which were rescheduled because Mark Selby and Mark Williams played the final of the British Open on 1 October. Results as follows:

- **Mark Selby** (ENG) (1) **4**–1 Xing Zihao (CHN)
- **Mark Williams** (WAL) (10) **4**–0 Ian Burns (ENG)
- **Elliot Slessor** (ENG) **4**–2 Ryan Davies (ENG)

=== Leicester ===
The results of the qualifying matches played in Leicester were as follows:

- **He Guoqiang** (CHN) **4**–2 Andy Lee (HKG)
- Jiang Jun (CHN) 0–**4** **Julien Leclercq** (BEL)
- **Si Jiahui** (CHN) (30) **4**–3 Alexander Ursenbacher (SUI)
- **Zhou Yuelong** (CHN) (27) **4**–2 Ben Woollaston (ENG)
- Peng Yisong (CHN) 1–**4** **Graeme Dott** (SCO)
- Ishpreet Singh Chadha (IND) 0–**4** **Wu Yize** (CHN)
- **Gary Wilson** (ENG) (18) **4**–3 Pang Junxu (CHN)
- **Fan Zhengyi** (CHN) (31) **4**–1 Andres Petrov (EST)
- Rory Thor (MAS) 1–**4** **Louis Heathcote** (ENG)
- **Hossein Vafaei** (IRN) (17) **4**–0 Liam Graham (SCO)
- John Astley (ENG) 2–**4** **Martin Gould** (ENG)
- Sam Craigie (ENG) 0–**4** **Michael White** (WAL)
- Joe Perry (ENG) (24) 1–**4** **Mark Davis** (ENG)
- **Jimmy Robertson** (ENG) (28) **4**–0 Reanne Evans (ENG)
- Rod Lawler (ENG) 3–**4** **Hammad Miah** (ENG)
- Mark Joyce (ENG) 3–**4** **Lukas Kleckers** (GER)
- **David Lilley** (ENG) **4**–1 Thepchaiya Un-Nooh (THA)
- Mink Nutcharut (THA) 0–**4** **Cao Yupeng** (CHN)
- Long Zehuang (CHN) 3–**4** **Scott Donaldson** (SCO)
- **Zhang Anda** (CHN) **4**–0 Ben Mertens (BEL)
- Victor Sarkis (BRA) 1–**4** **Adam Duffy** (ENG)
- Ken Doherty (IRL) 0–**4** **Jackson Page** (WAL)
- Stephen Hendry (SCO) 0–**4** **Fergal O'Brien** (IRL)
- **Chris Wakelin** (ENG) (26) **4**–1 Lyu Haotian (CHN)
- **Stephen Maguire** (SCO) (32) **4**–3 Daniel Wells (WAL)
- **Allan Taylor** (ENG) **4**–3 Jak Jones (WAL)
- **Anthony McGill** (SCO) (19) **4**–1 Himanshu Jain (IND)
- Ahmed Aly Elsayed (USA) 0–**4** **Liam Pullen** (ENG)
- **David Gilbert** (ENG) (25) **4**–1 Dean Young (SCO)
- **Matthew Selt** (ENG) (29) **4**–2 Alfie Burden (ENG)
- Ryan Thomerson (AUS) 1–**4** **Andrew Higginson** (ENG)
- Mohamed Ibrahim (EGY) 0–**4** **Andy Hicks** (ENG)
- **Tom Ford** (ENG) (21) **4**–3 Xu Si (CHN)
- Aaron Hill (IRL) 0–**4** **Yuan Sijun** (CHN)
- **Xiao Guodong** (CHN) **4**–1 Tian Pengfei (CHN)
- Baipat Siripaporn (THA) 3–**4** **Muhammad Asif** (PAK)
- **James Cahill** (ENG) **4**–2 Manasawin Phetmalaikul (THA)
- **Ricky Walden** (ENG) (20) **4**–0 Jordan Brown (NIR)
- Noppon Saengkham (THA) (23) 2–**4** **Dylan Emery** (WAL)
- Zak Surety (ENG) 1–**4** **Oliver Brown** (ENG)
- Liam Highfield (ENG) 1–**4** **Martin O'Donnell** (ENG)
- **Stuart Carrington** (ENG) **4**–0 Anton Kazakov (UKR)
- **Jamie Jones** (WAL) **4**–1 Ross Muir (SCO)
- Ashley Carty (ENG) 2–**4** **David Grace** (ENG)
- Stuart Bingham (ENG) (22) 1–**4** **Jenson Kendrick** (ENG)
- Jimmy White (ENG) 2–**4** **Joe O'Connor** (ENG)
- **Dominic Dale** (WAL) **4**–1 Rebecca Kenna (ENG)

== Century breaks ==
=== Main stage centuries ===
A total of 57 century breaks were made during the main stage of the tournament in Brentwood.

- 145, 137, 132, 124 – John Higgins
- 140, 137, 135, 120, 111, 103, 102 – Judd Trump
- 140 – Tom Ford
- 139 – Julien Leclercq
- 135, 114 – Matthew Selt
- 134, 102 – Ricky Walden
- 134 – Barry Hawkins
- 132 – Cao Yupeng
- 129 – Robert Milkins
- 128, 127, 116, 109 – Zhang Anda
- 128 – Ali Carter
- 128 – Jimmy Robertson
- 127, 114, 104, 104, 103 – Mark Allen
- 127 – Mark Selby
- 123, 123, 111, 100 – Mark Williams
- 122, 109, 105 – Ronnie O'Sullivan
- 121 – Stan Moody
- 120 – Luca Brecel
- 120 – Martin O'Donnell
- 116, 112 – He Guoqiang
- 113 – Marco Fu
- 111 – Martin Gould
- 109 – Jackson Page
- 108 – Gary Wilson
- 106, 102 – Zhou Yuelong
- 106 – Mark Davis
- 104 – Wu Yize
- 102 – Jamie Clarke
- 102 – Michael White
- 101 – Ding Junhui
- 101 – Si Jiahui
- 100 – Jack Lisowski

=== Qualifying stage centuries ===
A total of 14 century breaks were made during the qualifying stage of the tournament in Leicester.

- 140, 111 – James Cahill
- 135 – Graeme Dott
- 131, 130 – Stephen Maguire
- 121 – Ricky Walden
- 116 – Andrew Higginson
- 110 – Liam Highfield
- 105, 103 – David Gilbert
- 102 – Peng Yisong
- 102 – Gary Wilson
- 101 – Zhang Anda
- 100 – Noppon Saengkham
