= 2024 Scottish Open (snooker) =

Snooker tournament

2024 BetVictor Scottish Open

Tournament information
- Dates: 9–15 December 2024
- Venue: Meadowbank Sports Centre
- City: Edinburgh
- Country: Scotland
- Organisation: World Snooker Tour
- Format: Ranking event
- Total prize fund: £550,400
- Winner's share: £100,000
- Highest break: Xu Si (CHN) (139)

Final
- Champion: Lei Peifan (CHN)
- Runner-up: Wu Yize (CHN)
- Score: 9–5

The 2024 Scottish Open (officially the 2024 BetVictor Scottish Open) was a professional snooker tournament that took place from 9 to 15 December 2024 at the Meadowbank Sports Centre in Edinburgh, Scotland. It was the 11th ranking event of the 2024‍–‍25 season (following the 2024 Shoot Out and preceding the 2025 German Masters) and the third of four tournaments in the season's Home Nations Series (following the 2024 English Open and the 2024 Northern Ireland Open and preceding the 2025 Welsh Open). The event was broadcast by Eurosport and Discovery+ in Europe (including the United Kingdom and Ireland) and by other broadcasters internationally. The winner received £100,000 from a total prize fund of £550,400, the Stephen Hendry trophy, and a place in the 2025 Champion of Champions invitational event.

Gary Wilson was the two‑time defending champion, having successfully defended his 2022 title by defeating Noppon Saengkham 9‍–‍5 in the 2023 final. Wilson was beaten 2‍–‍4 by Long Zehuang in the first round. Lei Peifan, ranked 84th in the world, defeated Wu Yize 9‍–‍5 in the final to win his first ranking event. A total of 60 century breaks were made in the event, with 12 made during the qualifying stage, and 48 at the main stage, the highest being a 139 compiled by Xu Si in qualifying.

== Format ==
The event took place from 9 to 15 December 2024 at the Meadowbank Sports Centre in Edinburgh, Scotland. Qualifying took place from 28 to 30 October 2024 at the Ponds Forge International Sports Centre in Sheffield, England.

The WST implemented a new format for the four Home Nations events this season. In qualifying round one, players seeded 65‍–‍96 face those seeded 97‍–‍128. In qualifying round two, the 32 round one winners play those seeded 33‍–‍64. The 32 round two winners then play the top 32 seeds.

All matches were played as best of seven frames until the quarter‑finals, which were best of nine. The semi‑finals were best of 11, and the final was a best‑of‑17‑frame match played over two sessions.

The qualifying rounds were broadcast by Discovery+ in Europe (including the United Kingdom and Ireland) and by the CBSA‑WPBSA Academy WeChat Channel and Huya Live in China. They were available from Matchroom Sport in all other territories.

The main event was broadcast by Eurosport, Discovery+ and DMAX in Europe (including the United Kingdom and Ireland); by the CBSA‑WPBSA Academy WeChat Channel, the CBSA‑WPBSA Academy Douyin and Huya Live in China; by Now TV in Hong Kong; by Astro SuperSport in Malaysia and Brunei; by True Sports in Thailand; by TAP in the Philippines; and by Sportcast in Taiwan. It was available from Matchroom Sport in all other territories.

=== Prize fund ===
The tournament winner received the Stephen Hendry trophy. The breakdown of prize money for the event, an increase of £123,400 from the previous event, is shown below:

- Winner: £100,000
- Runner-up: £45,000
- Semi-final: £21,000
- Quarter-final: £13,200
- Last 16: £9,000
- Last 32: £5,400
- Last 64: £3,600
- Last 96: £1,000
- Highest break: £5,000
- Total: £550,400

== Summary ==
=== Qualifying rounds ===
==== Round 1 ====
On 28 October Stan Moody beat Iulian Boiko 4‍–‍2, Louis Heathcote whitewashed Joshua Thomond, and Dean Young beat Daniel Womersley 4‍–‍2. On 29 October Jimmy White defeated Hatem Yassen 4‍–‍1.

==== Round 2 ====
On 29 October Young beat Thepchaiya Un-Nooh 4‍–‍3, Anthony McGill beat Allan Taylor 4‍–‍2, He Guoqiang whitewashed Heathcote, Ishpreet Singh Chadha beat Sanderson Lam 4‍–‍2, Julien Leclercq defeated Jamie Clarke 4‍–‍3, and Lyu Haotian recovered from 0‍–‍3 down to beat Wang Yuchen 4‍–‍3. On 30 October Graeme Dott beat Jiang Jun 4‍–‍2, Alexander Ursenbacher recovered from 0‍–‍2 down to beat Ben Woollaston 4‍–‍3, making a 137 break in the third frame, and Lei Peifan beat Dominic Dale 4‍–‍1. Jackson Page defeated White 4‍–‍1, Farakh Ajaib beat Elliot Slessor also by 4‍–‍1, and Moody beat Tian Pengfei 4‍–‍2. Daniel Wells whitewashed Rory Thor making a 112 break in the second frame, his 100th professional career century, and Jamie Jones came from 2‍–‍3 down to defeat Oliver Lines 4‍–‍3.

=== Main stages ===
Before the start of the tournament Judd Trump and Mark Williams withdrew, and so Chadha and David Lilley were given walkovers to the last 32. David Gilbert also withdrew and so Robbie Williams was given a walkover to the last 32. Ronnie O'Sullivan also withdrew and so Xing Zihao was given a walkover to the last 32.

==== Last 64 ====
The last 64 matches were played on 9 and 10 December as the best of 7 frames.

On 9 December Long Zehuang defeated defending champion Gary Wilson 4‍–‍2, and John Higgins beat Ian Burns, also by 4‍–‍2. Barry Hawkins beat Ursenbacher 4‍–‍2, and Mark Allen defeated He 4‍–‍1. On 10 December Luca Brecel beat Leclercq 4‍–‍3, Stephen Maguire whitewashed Matthew Selt, and Kyren Wilson whitewashed David Grace. Young, ranked 98, defeated Pang Junxu 4‍–‍2, and Shaun Murphy whitewashed Wells.

==== Last 32 ====
The last 32 matches were played on 11 December as the best of 7 frames.

Maguire defeated Wilson 4‍–‍2, Hawkins beat Higgins 4‍–‍3, and Allen beat Ryan Day 4‍–‍2. In the final frame of the evening, Noppon Saengkham missed out on his 4th career 147 after missing the pink. However, the 134 break was enough to see him defeat Mark Selby 4‍–‍2.

==== Last 16 ====
The last 16 matches were played on 12 December as the best of 7 frames.

Brecel recovered from 1‍–‍3 down to beat Ding Junhui 4‍–‍3, Allen defeated Jack Lisowski also by 4‍–‍3, and Chris Wakelin beat Xing 4‍–‍1. Wu Yize beat Hawkins 4‍–‍3, Lei defeated Stuart Bingham also by 4‍–‍3, and Tom Ford beat Long 4‍–‍1.

==== Quarter-finals ====
The quarter‑finals were played on 13 December as the best of 9 frames.

In the afternoon session Wu beat Wakelin 5‍–‍4 although Wakelin made two century breaks, and Xiao Guodong defeated Brecel 5‍–‍1. In the evening session Allen beat Saengkham 5‍–‍2 with Allen making three century breaks, and Lei beat Ford 5‍–‍4 although Ford made two century breaks.

==== Semi-finals ====
The semi‑finals were played on 14 December as the best of 11 frames.

In the afternoon session, Wu recovered from 2‍–‍4 down to beat Xiao 6‍–‍4 making a 115 break in the 9th frame. After the match, Wu commented: "I really enjoyed the atmosphere today. In the past, I might have felt a lot of pressure in situations like this, but now I just find it enjoyable."

In the evening session Lei recovered from 2‍–‍5 down to beat Allen 6‍–‍5. After the match, Lei commented: "It is very exciting to win. Today I didn't play very well in the first session. I was telling myself not to give up, just to focus on the table and play. It was my first time in a semi‑final so I just wanted to enjoy the moment." Allen said: "I probably got what I deserved for not winning 6‍–‍2. I missed the pink when I was 5‍–‍2 up and then everything started to go against me. I just didn't close the match out well enough. I've got no regrets. He potted some good balls in the last, so credit to him."

==== Final ====
The final was played on 15 December as the best of 17 frames, played over two sessions.

In the afternoon session, Lei took the first four frames but Wu fought back to reduce the deficit to 3‍–‍5 going into the last session. Lei went on to win the match 9‍–‍5. After the match, Lei commented: "Honestly, it feels so unexpected to win the title. I initially just wanted to better my previous best result, which was the last 16. Reaching that stage already felt satisfying, so I played with no pressure and didn't overthink things." Wu said: "This week I think I performed well overall, but not in this final match. I don't know what happened. It felt like I was playing without any touch or rhythm. I didn't really put much pressure on myself, but maybe I was a bit nervous in the first four frames. I tried to adjust later on, but it still didn't feel right." The win moved Lei up from 84th to 43rd in the world rankings, and he became the lowest‑ranked winner of a ranking event since Dave Harold (then ranked 93) beat Darren Morgan in the final of the 1993 Asian Open.

== Main draw ==
The results of the main draw are shown below. Numbers in parentheses after the players' names denote the top 32 seeds, and players in bold denote match winners.

=== Top half ===
**Last 64**; Best of 7 frames
Gary Wilson (ENG) (1)	2
**Long Zehuang (CHN)**	**4**
**Joe O'Connor (ENG) (32)**	**4**
Lyu Haotian (CHN)	1
**Neil Robertson (AUS) (16)**	**4**
Fan Zhengyi (CHN)	1
**Tom Ford (ENG) (17)**	**4**
Antoni Kowalski (POL)	2
Hossein Vafaei (IRN) (24)	1
**Lei Peifan (CHN)**	**4**
**Shaun Murphy (ENG) (9)**	**4**
Daniel Wells (WAL)	0
**Stuart Bingham (ENG) (25)**	**4**
Jimmy Robertson (ENG)	0
Mark Williams (WAL) (8) (Note: Mark Williams withdrew and so David Lilley was given a walkover to the last 32.)	w/d
**David Lilley (ENG)**	**w/o**
**Mark Selby (ENG) (5)**	**4**
Stuart Carrington (ENG)	0
**Noppon Saengkham (THA) (28)**	**4**
Ricky Walden (ENG)	3
**Ali Carter (ENG) (12)**	**4**
Graeme Dott (SCO)	2
David Gilbert (ENG) (21) (Note: David Gilbert withdrew and so Robbie Williams was given a walkover to the last 32.)	w/d
**Robbie Williams (ENG)**	**w/o**
**Jack Lisowski (ENG) (20)**	**4**
Jordan Brown (NIR)	0
**Si Jiahui (CHN) (13)**	**4**
Ma Hailong (CHN)	1
**Ryan Day (WAL) (29)**	**4**
Anthony McGill (SCO)	1
**Mark Allen (NIR) (4)**	**4**
He Guoqiang (CHN)	1

**Last 32**; Best of 7 frames
**(China) Long Zehuang**	**4**
(England) Joe O'Connor (32)	3
(Australia) Neil Robertson (16)	1
**(England) Tom Ford (17)**	**4**
**(China) Lei Peifan**	**4**
(England) Shaun Murphy (9)	3
**(England) Stuart Bingham (25)**	**4**
(England) David Lilley	2
(England) Mark Selby (5)	2
**(Thailand) Noppon Saengkham (28)**	**4**
**(England) Ali Carter (12)**	**4**
(England) Robbie Williams	3
**(England) Jack Lisowski (20)**	**4**
(China) Si Jiahui (13)	0
(Wales) Ryan Day (29)	2
**(Northern Ireland) Mark Allen (4)**	**4**

**Last 16**; Best of 7 frames
(China) Long Zehuang	1
**(England) Tom Ford (17)**	**4**
**(China) Lei Peifan**	**4**
(England) Stuart Bingham (25)	3
**(Thailand) Noppon Saengkham (28)**	**4**
(England) Ali Carter (12)	2
(England) Jack Lisowski (20)	3
**(Northern Ireland) Mark Allen (4)**	**4**

**Quarter-finals**; Best of 9 frames
(England) Tom Ford (17)	4
**(China) Lei Peifan**	**5**
(Thailand) Noppon Saengkham (28)	2
**(Northern Ireland) Mark Allen (4)**	**5**

**Semi-finals**; Best of 11 frames
**(China) Lei Peifan**	**6**
(Northern Ireland) Mark Allen (4)	5

Note: w/d=withdrawn; w/o=walkover

=== Bottom half ===
**Last 64**; Best of 7 frames
Judd Trump (ENG) (3) (Note: Judd Trump withdrew and so Ishpreet Singh Chadha was given a walkover to the last 32.)	w/d
**Ishpreet Singh Chadha (IND)**	**w/o**
**Wu Yize (CHN) (30)**	**4**
Farakh Ajaib (PAK)	1
**John Higgins (SCO) (14)**	**4**
Ian Burns (ENG)	2
**Barry Hawkins (ENG) (19)**	**4**
Alexander Ursenbacher (SUI)	2
**Chris Wakelin (ENG) (22)**	**4**
Scott Donaldson (SCO)	0
**Zhang Anda (CHN) (11)**	**4**
Stan Moody (ENG)	3
Pang Junxu (CHN) (27)	2
**Dean Young (SCO)**	**4**
Ronnie O'Sullivan (ENG) (6) (Note: Ronnie O'Sullivan withdrew and so Xing Zihao was given a walkover to the last 32.)	w/d
**Xing Zihao (CHN)**	**w/o**
**Luca Brecel (BEL) (7)**	**4**
Julien Leclercq (BEL)	3
**Zhou Yuelong (CHN) (26)**	**4**
Yuan Sijun (CHN)	1
**Ding Junhui (CHN) (10)**	**4**
Mark Davis (ENG)	0
Robert Milkins (ENG) (23)	2
**Jackson Page (WAL)**	**4**
**Xiao Guodong (CHN) (18)**	**4**
Xu Si (CHN)	1
**Jak Jones (WAL) (15)**	**4**
Jamie Jones (WAL)	1
**Stephen Maguire (SCO) (31)**	**4**
Matthew Selt (ENG)	0
**Kyren Wilson (ENG) (2)**	**4**
David Grace (ENG)	0

**Last 32**; Best of 7 frames
(India) Ishpreet Singh Chadha	2
**(China) Wu Yize (30)**	**4**
(Scotland) John Higgins (14)	3
**(England) Barry Hawkins (19)**	**4**
**(England) Chris Wakelin (22)**	**4**
(China) Zhang Anda (11)	2
(Scotland) Dean Young	3
**(China) Xing Zihao**	**4**
**(Belgium) Luca Brecel (7)**	**4**
(China) Zhou Yuelong (26)	1
**(China) Ding Junhui (10)**	**4**
(Wales) Jackson Page	2
**(China) Xiao Guodong (18)**	**4**
(Wales) Jak Jones (15)	3
**(Scotland) Stephen Maguire (31)**	**4**
(England) Kyren Wilson (2)	2

**Last 16**; Best of 7 frames
**(China) Wu Yize (30)**	**4**
(England) Barry Hawkins (19)	3
**(England) Chris Wakelin (22)**	**4**
(China) Xing Zihao	1
**(Belgium) Luca Brecel (7)**	**4**
(China) Ding Junhui (10)	3
**(China) Xiao Guodong (18)**	**4**
(Scotland) Stephen Maguire (31)	1

**Quarter-finals**; Best of 9 frames
**(China) Wu Yize (30)**	**5**
(England) Chris Wakelin (22)	4
(Belgium) Luca Brecel (7)	1
**(China) Xiao Guodong (18)**	**5**

**Semi-finals**; Best of 11 frames
**(China) Wu Yize (30)**	**6**
(China) Xiao Guodong (18)	4

Note: w/d=withdrawn; w/o=walkover

=== Final ===
Final: Best of 17 frames. Referee: Colin Humphries; Meadowbank Sports Centre, Edinburgh, Scotland, 15 December 2024
**Lei Peifan**; China	**9**–5	Wu Yize (30); China
Afternoon: **68**–1, **56**–13, **73**–29, **75**–0, 0–**102**, 52–**73**, **67**–15, 9–**79**; Evening: 4–**69**, **70**–16, **61**–36, **69**–56, 39–**65**, **68**–0
(frame 4) **71**	Highest break	69 (frame 5)
0	Century breaks	0

== Qualifying rounds ==
The results of the qualifying rounds are shown below. Numbers in parentheses after the players' names denote the players' seeding, an "a" indicates amateur players who were not on the main World Snooker Tour, and players in bold denote match winners.

**Round 1 (Last 128)**; Best of 7 frames
**Liu Hongyu (CHN) (65)**	**4**
Reanne Evans (ENG) (109)	1
Liam Davies (WAL) (96)	3
**Wang Yuchen (HKG) (113)**	**4**
**Andrew Higginson (ENG) (80)**	**4**
Paul Deaville (ENG) (a)	2
Gong Chenzhi (CHN) (81)	2
**Antoni Kowalski (POL) (101)**	**4**
**Lei Peifan (CHN) (88)**	**4**
Haydon Pinhey (ENG) (105)	3
**Rory Thor (MAS) (73)**	**4**
Mitchell Mann (ENG) (111)	2
**Ben Mertens (BEL) (89)**	**4**
Robbie McGuigan (NIR) (98)	0
Hammad Miah (ENG) (72)	3
**Haris Tahir (PAK) (102)**	**4**
**Stuart Carrington (ENG) (69)**	**4**
Mink Nutcharut (THA) (106)	1
Artemijs Žižins (LAT) (92)	2
**Huang Jiahao (CHN) (108)**	**4**
**Jiang Jun (CHN) (76)**	**4**
Chris Totten (SCO) (104)	0
**Zak Surety (ENG) (85)**	**4**
Jack Borwick (SCO) (a)	0
Liam Pullen (ENG) (84)	3
**Mostafa Dorgham (EGY) (100)**	**4**
**Ma Hailong (CHN) (77)**	**4**
Baipat Siripaporn (THA) (114)	0
**Allan Taylor (ENG) (93)**	**4**
Anton Kazakov (UKR) (a)	0
**Louis Heathcote (ENG) (68)**	**4**
Joshua Thomond (ENG) (a)	0

**Round 2 (Last 96)**; Best of 7 frames
**Long Zehuang (CHN) (64)**	**4**
Liu Hongyu (CHN) (65)	2
**Lyu Haotian (CHN) (33)**	**4**
Wang Yuchen (HKG) (113)	3
**Fan Zhengyi (CHN) (49)**	**4**
Andrew Higginson (ENG) (80)	0
Joe Perry (ENG) (48)	3
**Antoni Kowalski (POL) (101)**	**4**
Dominic Dale (WAL) (41)	1
**Lei Peifan (CHN) (88)**	**4**
**Daniel Wells (WAL) (56)**	**4**
Rory Thor (MAS) (73)	0
**Jimmy Robertson (ENG) (40)**	**4**
Ben Mertens (BEL) (89)	2
**David Lilley (ENG) (57)**	**4**
Haris Tahir (PAK) (102)	1
Aaron Hill (IRL) (60)	1
**Stuart Carrington (ENG) (69)**	**4**
**Ricky Walden (ENG) (37)**	**4**
Huang Jiahao (CHN) (108)	2
**Graeme Dott (SCO) (53)**	**4**
Jiang Jun (CHN) (76)	2
**Robbie Williams (ENG) (44)**	**4**
Zak Surety (ENG) (85)	2
**Jordan Brown (NIR) (45)**	**4**
Mostafa Dorgham (EGY) (100)	2
Matthew Stevens (WAL) (52)	1
**Ma Hailong (CHN) (77)**	**4**
**Anthony McGill (SCO) (36)**	**4**
Allan Taylor (ENG) (93)	2
**He Guoqiang (CHN) (61)**	**4**
Louis Heathcote (ENG) (68)	0

**Round 1 (Last 128)**; Best of 7 frames
**Ishpreet Singh Chadha (IND) (67)**	**4**
Ahmed Aly Elsayed (USA) (114)	3
Liam Graham (SCO) (94)	2
**Farakh Ajaib (PAK) (107)**	**4**
**Ian Burns (ENG) (78)**	**4**
Simon Blackwell (ENG) (a)	1
**Alexander Ursenbacher (SUI) (83)**	**4**
Michael Holt (ENG) (99)	3
Duane Jones (WAL) (86)	2
**Amir Sarkhosh (IRN) (97)**	**4**
**Stan Moody (ENG) (75)**	**4**
Iulian Boiko (UKR) (a)	2
**Dean Young (SCO) (91)**	**4**
Daniel Womersley (ENG) (a)	2
**Xing Zihao (CHN) (70)**	**4**
Manasawin Phetmalaikul (THA) (112)	3
Alfie Burden (ENG) (71)	2
**Julien Leclercq (BEL) (103)**	**4**
**Bulcsú Révész (HUN) (90)**	**4**
Bai Yulu (CHN) (116)	1
**Ross Muir** (SCO) (74)	**w/o**
Ken Doherty (IRL) (118) (Note: Ken Doherty withdrew for medical reasons and so Ross Muir was given a walkover.)	w/d
**Jimmy White (ENG) (87)**	**4**
Hatem Yassen (EGY) (a)	1
**Andrew Pagett (WAL) (82)**	**4**
Dylan Emery (WAL) (a)	3
**Oliver Lines (ENG) (79)**	**4**
Ayaan Iqbal (SCO) (a)	1
**Cheung Ka Wai (HKG) (95)**	**4**
Kreishh Gurbaxani (IND) (115)	0
**Ashley Carty (ENG) (66)**	**4**
Jonas Luz (BRA) (110)	0

**Round 2 (Last 96)**; Best of 7 frames
Sanderson Lam (ENG) (62)	2
**Ishpreet Singh Chadha (IND) (67)**	**4**
Elliot Slessor (ENG) (35)	1
**Farakh Ajaib (PAK) (107)**	**4**
Martin O'Donnell (ENG) (51)	2
**Ian Burns (ENG) (78)**	**4**
Ben Woollaston (ENG) (46)	3
**Alexander Ursenbacher (SUI) (83)**	**4**
**Scott Donaldson (SCO) (43)**	**4**
Amir Sarkhosh (IRN) (97)	3
Tian Pengfei (CHN) (54)	2
**Stan Moody (ENG) (75)**	**4**
Thepchaiya Un-Nooh (THA) (38)	3
**Dean Young (SCO) (91)**	**4**
Anthony Hamilton (ENG) (59)	1
**Xing Zihao (CHN) (70)**	**4**
Jamie Clarke (WAL) (58)	3
**Julien Leclercq (BEL) (103)**	**4**
**Yuan Sijun (CHN) (39)**	**4**
Bulcsú Révész (HUN) (90)	2
**Mark Davis (ENG) (55)**	**4**
Ross Muir (SCO) (74)	0
**Jackson Page (WAL) (42)**	**4**
Jimmy White (ENG) (87)	1
**Xu Si (CHN) (47)**	**4**
Andrew Pagett (WAL) (82)	1
**Jamie Jones (WAL) (50)**	**4**
Oliver Lines (ENG) (79)	3
**Matthew Selt (ENG) (34)**	**4**
Cheung Ka Wai (HKG) (95)	0
**David Grace (ENG) (63)**	**4**
Ashley Carty (ENG) (66)	1

Note: w/d=withdrawn; w/o=walkover

== Century breaks ==
=== Main stage centuries ===
A total of 48 century breaks were made during the main stage of the tournament in Edinburgh.

- 138 – Xing Zihao
- 137, 126, 125 – Ding Junhui
- 136, 134, 120 – Noppon Saengkham
- 136, 125 – Tom Ford
- 136, 124, 122 – Ryan Day
- 136 – Mark Selby
- 135, 115, 102 – Wu Yize
- 134 – Lei Peifan
- 133 – Jackson Page
- 133 – Dean Young
- 130, 107 – Barry Hawkins
- 130 – Ian Burns
- 128 – Stephen Maguire
- 127, 127, 120, 112, 105, 104, 104, 103 – Mark Allen
- 124 – Julien Leclercq
- 123, 113 – Joe O'Connor
- 120, 116, 100 – Shaun Murphy
- 115 – Zhou Yuelong
- 114, 106 – Xiao Guodong
- 108 – Kyren Wilson
- 107, 103 – Luca Brecel
- 107, 103 – Chris Wakelin
- 106, 101 – Jack Lisowski
- 101 – Jak Jones

=== Qualifying stage centuries ===
A total of 12 century breaks were made during the qualifying stage of the tournament in Sheffield.

- 139 – Xu Si
- 137 – Alexander Ursenbacher
- 132 – Stuart Carrington
- 127 – Antoni Kowalski
- 123 – Oliver Lines
- 116 – He Guoqiang
- 112 – Daniel Wells
- 108 – David Grace
- 107 – Hammad Miah
- 105 – Zak Surety
- 105 – Allan Taylor
- 100 – Ricky Walden
