= Ishpreet Singh Chadha =

Indian snooker player

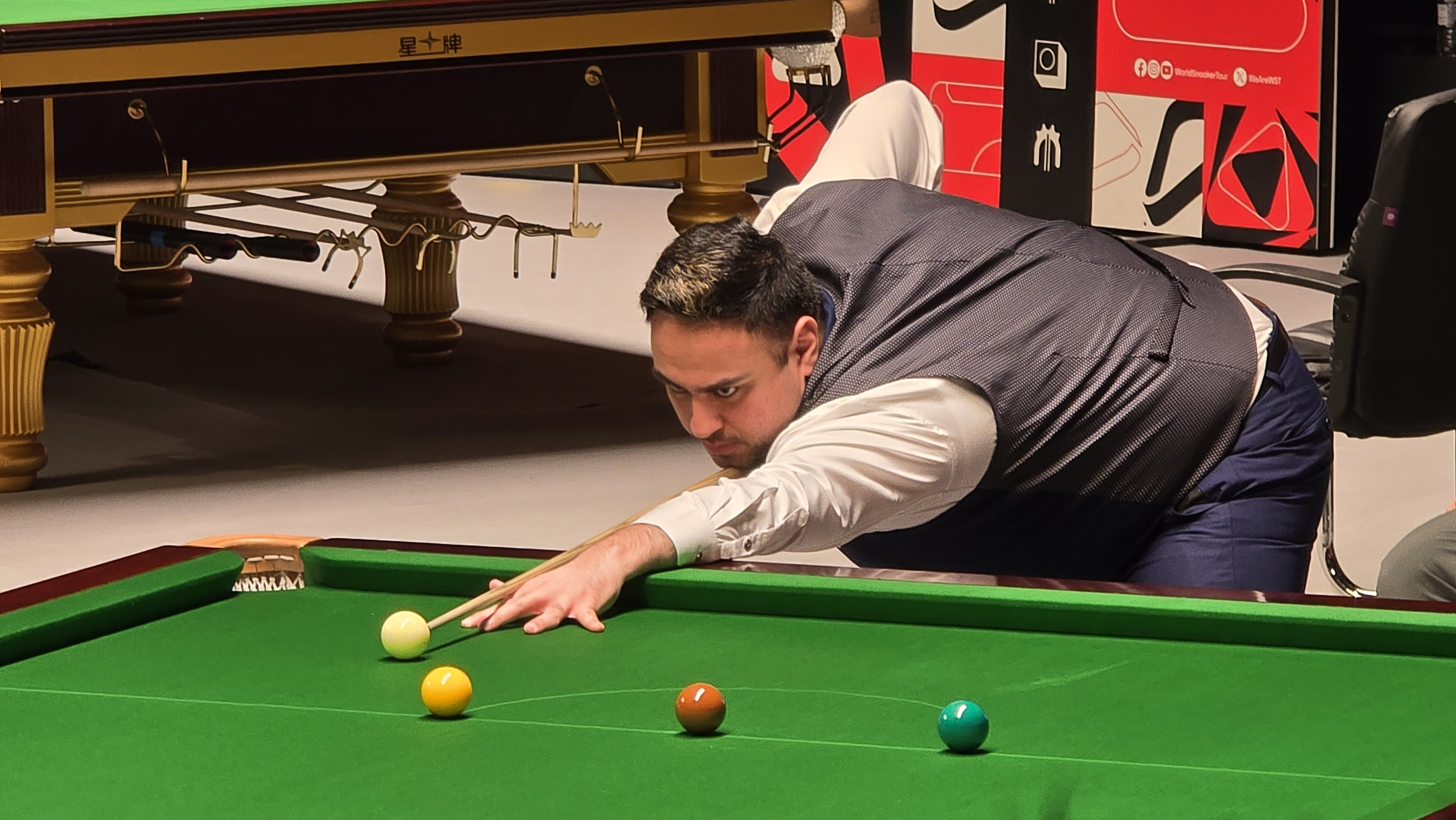
- Ishpreet Singh Chadha at German Masters in 2026

Personal information
- Nickname: The Star of India
- Born: 30 May 1996 (age 30) Mumbai, Maharashtra

Sport
- Country: India
- Sport: Snooker
- Professional: 2023–present
- Highest ranking: 58 (August 2026)
- Current ranking: 67 (as of 7 November 2026)
- Best ranking finish: Semi-final (2024 English Open)

Ishpreet Singh Chadha (Hindi: इशप्रीत सिंह चढ्ढा, born 30 May 1996) is an Indian snooker player. He has earned a two-year card on the World Snooker Tour starting with 2023–24 snooker season.

== Career ==
From Mumbai, Maharashtra, he and fellow-Mumbai native Kreishh Gurbaxani have been described as protégés (Note: The source misspelled this as prodigies.) of Indian former-professional snooker player Yasin Merchant.

In April 2022, Chadha beat Pushpender Singh to win Bangalore Snooker Academy’s all-India Open snooker championship. In December 2022, Chadha was crowned the SAARC Snooker champion in Dhaka, defeating Ahsan Ramzan on the way to the final, and then fellow Indian Brijesh Daman in the final. That month he defeated Pankaj Advani to win the 6-Red Snooker National Championships in Indore.

Chadha reached the final of the Asia-Oceania Q School in Bangkok in June 2023, with a run that included victories over Pakistan’s Sharjeel Mahmood Asmat and Yu Kiu Chang of Hong Kong. In the final round he defeated Hon Man Chau to earn a two-year card on the World Snooker Tour starting with the 2023–24 snooker season.

=== 2023/24 ===
He started the season being entered into the draw at the 2023 Championship League held at the Morningside Arena in Leicester, England, from 26 June 2023. He began his career with a credible draw against top-16 player David Gilbert, and finished his round-robin group stage with a win over Sean O'Sullivan. In August 2023, he defeated Manasawin Phetmalaikul 4-1 to qualify for the final stages of the 2023 British Open. At the event, he secured the biggest win of his career against former world champion Stuart Bingham. In September 2023, he also beat Anthony McGill to qualify for the 2023 Wuhan Open. He earned a second victory of the season over Stuart Bingham to qualify for the World Open, winning 5-3. In January 2024, he recorded the biggest win of his career with a 5-2 win over World Champion Luca Brecel at the 2024 German Masters.

=== 2024/25 ===
He reached the third round of the 2024 Saudi Arabia Snooker Masters where he was defeated by Hossein Vafaei.

At the 2024 English Open in Brentwood in September 2024, he reached the seminfinal with wins against He Guoqiang, Jak Jones, Hossein Vafaei, former world champion Graeme Dott, and four-time world champion Mark Selby. In doing so, he became the first Indian player to reach a ranking event semi final since Aditya Mehta in 2013. Chadha lost to Wu Yize in the semi-final without winning a frame.

In February 2025, he reached the last-32 of the 2025 Welsh Open with a win over defending champion Gary Wilson. He recorded a 10-2 win over Mateusz Baranowski in qualifying for the 2025 World Championship. He lost to Zhou Yuelong in the third round of qualifying for the 2025 World Snooker Championship.

=== 2025/26 ===
In January 2026, he reached the last-16 of the 2026 German Masters. In April 2026, he moved into the third round of qualifying at the 2026 World Snooker Championship with a 10-5 win over Chris Totten.

== Personal life ==
He was formerly a competitive esports player specialising in Counter-Strike: Global Offensive (CS:GO). He is nicknamed "HuNtR" on the gaming circuit.

== Performance and rankings timeline ==
Tournament	2016/ 17	2023/ 24	2024/ 25	2025/ 26	2026/ 27
Ranking (Note: It shows the ranking at the beginning of the season)	(Note: He was an amateur)	(Note: New players on the Main Tour don't have a ranking)	80	63	59
Ranking tournaments
Championship League	NR	RR	RR	A	RR
China Open	Tournament Not Held				LQ
Wuhan Open	NH	1R	1R	1R	LQ
British Open	NH	2R	LQ	LQ	2R
English Open	A	LQ	SF	1R	LQ
Shenzhen Open (Note: The event was called the Xi'an Grand Prix (2024/2025–2025/2026))	Not Held		LQ	1R	LQ
Northern Ireland Open	A	LQ	1R	LQ	LQ
International Championship	A	LQ	LQ	LQ	1R
UK Championship	A	LQ	LQ	LQ	
Shoot Out	A	1R	2R	2R	
Scottish Open	A	1R	2R	1R	LQ
German Masters	A	2R	LQ	2R	
Welsh Open	A	LQ	2R	LQ	
World Grand Prix	DNQ	DNQ	DNQ	DNQ	
Players Championship	DNQ	DNQ	DNQ	DNQ	
World Open	A	1R	1R	WD	
Tour Championship	NH	DNQ	DNQ	DNQ	
World Championship	A	LQ	LQ	LQ	
Former ranking tournaments
Indian Open	1R	Tournament Not Held			
European Masters	A	1R	Not Held		
Saudi Arabia Masters	Not Held		3R	2R	NH
Former non-ranking tournaments
Six-red World Championship	2R	Tournament Not Held			

Performance Table Legend
LQ	lost in the qualifying draw	#R	lost in the early rounds of the tournament (WR = Wildcard round, RR = Round robin)	QF	lost in the quarter-finals
SF	lost in the semi-finals	F	lost in the final	W	won the tournament
DNQ	did not qualify for the tournament	A	did not participate in the tournament	WD	withdrew from the tournament

NH / Not Held	means an event was not held.
NR / Non-Ranking Event	means an event is/was no longer a ranking event.
R / Ranking Event	means an event is/was a ranking event.
MR / Minor-Ranking Event	means an event is/was a minor-ranking event.

== Career finals ==
=== Amateur finals: 4 (3 titles) ===
Outcome	No.	Year	Championship	Opponent in the final	Score
Winner	1.	2015	Indian Under-17 Championship	(India) Shobhit Sethi	3–0
Winner	2.	2021	Indian Amateur Championship	(India) Malkeet Singh	6–3
Runner-up	1.	2022	Asian Championship	(Iran) Amir Sarkhosh	0–5
Winner	3.	2022	SAARC Championship	(India) Brijesh Damani	7–3
