= Xing Zihao =

Chinese snooker player

Personal information
- Born: 6 November 2004 (age 21) Jiaxing, Zhejiang, China

Sport
- Country: China
- Sport: Snooker
- Professional: 2023–2025
- Highest ranking: 73 (September 2024)
- Current ranking: (as of 26 October 2026)
- Best ranking finish: Last 16 (2023 Northern Ireland Open)

Xing Zihao
- Simplified Chinese: 邢子豪
- Traditional Chinese: 邢子豪
Transcriptions
Standard Mandarin
- Hanyu Pinyin: Xíng Zǐháo
Yue: Cantonese
- Yale Romanization: Yìhng Jí Hòugh
- Jyutping: Jing⁴ Zi² Hou⁴

Xing Zihao (Chinese: 邢子豪, born 6 November 2004) is a Chinese former professional snooker player. He achieved a two-year card on the World Snooker Tour, starting with the 2023-24 snooker season.

== Career ==
Xing Zihao trains at the International Billiards Academy in Yushan, east China. He represented Yushan at the China Snooker Team Tournament in July 2022, alongside Bai Langning and Huang Jiahao.

He won a place on the 2023-24 World Snooker Tour by qualifying from the CBSA qualifying events held in Beijing in April 2023. His place was earned with a victory over former professional Lei Peifan in the final qualifying round.

=== 2023/24 ===
Xing Zihao made his debut in a professional draw at the 2023 Championship League held at the Morningside Arena in Leicester, England from 26 June 2023. In his debut game he was defeated by experienced pro Anthony Hamilton but in the rest of the round-robin group stage drew with Ben Mertens and defeated Ryan Thomerson.

At the 2023 Wuhan Open he benefited from a walkover when World Champion Luca Brecel pulled out of the event. However, he took advantage by defeating Michael White to reach the last-32 of a ranking event for the first time, where he was defeated by Stephen Maguire. He qualified for the 2023 Northern Ireland Open with a 4-0 victory over David Grace. He followed this by defeating former World Champion Graeme Dott to reach the last-32 at the second consecutive ranking event.

At the 2023 UK Championship he beat veteran Jimmy White in the first qualifying round. In the first round of qualifying at the 2024 World Snooker Championship he defeated veteran Michael Holt 10-6.

=== 2024/25 ===
He made his season debut at the 2024 Championship League in Leicester in June 2024, and won matches against amateur Joshua Thomond and rookie pro Kreishh Gurbaxani, before losing to Ali Carter to finish second in his round-robin group. In July 2024, he defeated former world champion Stuart Bingham 5-1 in qualifying for the 2024 Wuhan Open. He reached the third round of the 2024 Saudi Arabia Snooker Masters where he was defeated by Bingham. He reached the last-16 at the 2024 Scottish Open. He defeated Alexander Ursenbacher 10-6 in the second round of qualifying for the 2025 World Championship, before losing to Chris Wakelin in the third round. Following the conclusion of his two year tour card he entered the Asia-Oceania Q School in May 2025 where he recorded a win over Thanawat Tirapongpaiboon.

== Performance and rankings timeline ==
Tournament	2023/ 24	2024/ 25
Ranking (Note: Shows the ranking at the beginning of the season)	(Note: New players on the Main Tour don't have a ranking)	76
Ranking tournaments
Championship League	RR	RR
Xi'an Grand Prix	NH	LQ
Saudi Arabia Masters	NH	3R
English Open	LQ	LQ
British Open	LQ	LQ
Wuhan Open	2R	1R
Northern Ireland Open	3R	LQ
International Championship	LQ	LQ
UK Championship	LQ	LQ
Shoot Out	1R	1R
Scottish Open	1R	3R
German Masters	1R	LQ
Welsh Open	LQ	LQ
World Open	LQ	LQ
World Grand Prix	DNQ	DNQ
Players Championship	DNQ	DNQ
Tour Championship	DNQ	DNQ
World Championship	LQ	LQ
Former ranking tournaments
European Masters	LQ	NH

Performance Table Legend
LQ	lost in the qualifying draw	#R	lost in the early rounds of the tournament (WR = Wildcard round, RR = Round robin)	QF	lost in the quarter-finals
SF	lost in the semi-finals	F	lost in the final	W	won the tournament
DNQ	did not qualify for the tournament	A	did not participate in the tournament	WD	withdrew from the tournament

NH / Not Held	means an event was not held.
NR / Non-Ranking Event	means an event is/was no longer a ranking event.
R / Ranking Event	means an event is/was a ranking event.
MR / Minor-Ranking Event	means an event is/was a minor-ranking event.
PA / Pro-am Event	means an event is/was a pro-am event.
