= 2024 Championship League (ranking) =

Snooker tournament, held June and July 2024

2024 BetVictor Championship League

Tournament information
- Dates: 10 June – 3 July 2024
- Venue: Leicester Arena
- City: Leicester
- Country: England
- Organisation: Matchroom Sport
- Format: Ranking event
- Total prize fund: £328,000
- Winner's share: £33,000
- Highest break: Wu Yize (CHN) (142)

Final
- Champion: Ali Carter (ENG)
- Runner-up: Jackson Page (WAL)
- Score: 3–1

The 2024 Championship League (officially the 2024 BetVictor Championship League Snooker) was a professional ranking snooker tournament that took place from 10 June to 3 July 2024 at the Leicester Arena in Leicester, England. Organised by Matchroom Sport, the event featured 128 players and was played as three rounds of round‑robin groups of four, before a best‑of‑five final. It was the fifth edition of the ranking version of the Championship League, and the first ranking tournament of the 2024‍–‍25 season.

Shaun Murphy was the defending champion, having defeated Mark Williams 3‍–‍0 in the final of the previous ranking edition of the tournament, but he was knocked out in Stage 2.

Ali Carter won his sixth ranking title, defeating Jackson Page 3‍–‍1 in the final. There were 95 century breaks made during the tournament, the highest being a 142 made by Wu Yize.

== Format ==
The competition began with 32 rounds of group matches with each group consisting of four players. Two groups were played to a finish every day using a two‑table setup in the arena. The groups were contested using a round‑robin format, with six matches played in each group. All matches in group play were played as best‑of‑four frames, with three points awarded for a win and one point for a draw. Group positions were determined by points scored, frame difference and then head‑to‑head results between players who were tied. Places that were still tied were then determined by the highest break made in the group. If the highest break was also tied, the next highest break made by the players was used.

The 32 players that topped the group tables qualified for the group winners' stage, consisting of eight groups of four players. The eight winners from the group winners' stage qualified for the two final groups, with the final taking place later on the same day. The winner took the Championship League title and a place in the 2024 Champion of Champions.

=== Participants ===
A number of top ranked players opted to miss the event, including world number one Mark Allen. Also former World Champions Judd Trump, Luca Brecel, and Mark Selby did not enter.

There were 26 players not currently on the professional tour who were entered into the draw as follows:

- Connor Benzey
- Simon Blackwell
- Iulian Boiko
- Kayden Brierley
- Harvey Chandler (Note: Harvey Chandler replaced Craig Steadman in Group 22.)
- Joshua Cooper
- Alfie Davies
- Ryan Davies
- Paul Deaville
- Umut Dikme
- Dylan Emery
- Gerard Greene
- Steven Hallworth
- Hamim Hussain
- Mark Joyce
- Anton Kazakov
- Peter Lines (Note: Peter Lines replaced Daegyu Lee in Group 13.)
- Rory McLeod (Note: Rory McLeod replaced Andres Petrov in Group 17.)
- Josh Mulholland
- Florian Nüßle
- Jamie O'Neill (Note: Jamie O'Neill replaced Noppon Saengkham in Group 19.)
- Barry Pinches
- Fergal Quinn (Note: Fergal Quinn replaced Bai Yulu in Group 4.)
- Zack Richardson
- Joshua Thomond
- Daniel Womersley

=== Broadcasters ===
The event was broadcast by DAZN in Germany, Spain, the United States and Brazil; Fox Sports in Australia; Nova in Czechia and Slovakia; Premier in the Philippines; Rigour in China; Viaplay in the Baltics, Iceland, and the Netherlands; Viasat in Scandinavia; and by Matchroom.live in all other territories.

=== Prize fund ===
The breakdown of prize money for the tournament is shown below.

- Stage one
- Winner: £3,000
- Runner-up: £2,000
- Third place: £1,000
- Fourth place: £0
- Stage two
- Winner: £4,000
- Runner-up: £3,000
- Third place: £2,000
- Fourth place: £1,000
- Stage three
- Winner: £6,000
- Runner-up: £4,000
- Third place: £2,000
- Fourth place: £1,000
- Final
- Winner: £20,000
- Runner-up: £10,000

- Tournament total: £328,000

Note: The champion receives a total of £33,000 (£3,000 + £4,000 + £6,000 + £20,000).

== Stage one ==
Stage one consisted of 32 groups, each having four players. Numbers in parentheses after the players' names denote the players' seeding, and (a) indicates amateur players not on the main World Snooker Tour.

=== Order of play ===
Order of play as follows:

Date	Group
10 June	Group 11
10 June	Group 21
11 June	Group 04
11 June	Group 17
12 June	Group 25
12 June	Group 31
13 June	Group 22
13 June	Group 23

Date	Group
14 June	Group 10
14 June	Group 32
15 June	Group 29
15 June	Group 30
17 June	Group 07
17 June	Group 08
18 June	Group 24
18 June	Group 28

Date	Group
19 June	Group 26
19 June	Group 27
20 June	Group 01
20 June	Group 14
21 June	Group 13
21 June	Group 18
22 June	Group 19
22 June	Group 20

Date	Group
24 June	Group 06
24 June	Group 09
25 June	Group 02
25 June	Group 12
26 June	Group 05
26 June	Group 16
27 June	Group 03
27 June	Group 15

=== Group 1 ===
Group 1 was played on 20 June. Scott Donaldson won the group and advanced to Stage 2, Group A.

==== Group 1 matches ====
- Kyren Wilson 2–2 Daniel Womersley
- Scott Donaldson 3–0 Baipat Siripaporn
- Scott Donaldson 3–1 Daniel Womersley
- Kyren Wilson 3–0 Baipat Siripaporn
- Baipat Siripaporn 0–3 Daniel Womersley
- Kyren Wilson 2–2 Scott Donaldson

==== Group 1 table ====
Pos.	Player	P	W	D	L	FW	FL	FD	HB	Pts.
1	Scott Donaldson (SCO) (38)	3	2	1	0	8	3	+5	101	7
2	Kyren Wilson (ENG) (1)	3	1	2	0	7	4	+3	126	5
3	Daniel Womersley (ENG) (a)	3	1	1	1	6	5	+1	54	4
4	Baipat Siripaporn (THA) (79)	3	0	0	3	0	9	−9	26	0

=== Group 2 ===
Group 2 was played on 25 June. He Guoqiang won the group and advanced to Stage 2, Group B.

==== Group 2 matches ====
- Ronnie O'Sullivan 3–0 Kayden Brierley
- He Guoqiang 1–3 Mitchell Mann
- He Guoqiang 3–0 Kayden Brierley
- Ronnie O'Sullivan 2–2 Mitchell Mann
- Mitchell Mann 2–2 Kayden Brierley
- Ronnie O'Sullivan 0–3 He Guoqiang

==== Group 2 table ====
Pos.	Player	P	W	D	L	FW	FL	FD	HB	Pts.
1	He Guoqiang (CHN) (52)	3	2	0	1	7	3	+4	80	6
2	Mitchell Mann (ENG) (82)	3	1	2	0	7	5	+2	93	5
3	Ronnie O'Sullivan (ENG) (2)	3	1	1	1	5	5	0	88	4
4	Kayden Brierley (ENG) (a)	3	0	1	2	2	8	−6	55	1

=== Group 3 ===
Group 3 was played on 27 June. The defending champion Shaun Murphy won the group and advanced to Stage 2, Group C.

==== Group 3 matches ====
- Shaun Murphy 3–0 Steven Hallworth
- Tian Pengfei 3–0 Reanne Evans
- Tian Pengfei 1–3 Steven Hallworth
- Shaun Murphy 3–1 Reanne Evans
- Reanne Evans 0–3 Steven Hallworth
- Shaun Murphy 3–0 Tian Pengfei

==== Group 3 table ====
Pos.	Player	P	W	D	L	FW	FL	FD	HB	Pts.
1	Shaun Murphy (ENG) (3)	3	3	0	0	9	1	+8	100	9
2	Steven Hallworth (ENG) (a)	3	2	0	1	6	4	+2	68	6
3	Tian Pengfei (CHN) (39)	3	1	0	2	4	6	−2	94	3
4	Reanne Evans (ENG) (77)	3	0	0	3	1	9	−8	46	0

=== Group 4 ===
Group 4 was played on 11 June. Mark Williams won the group and advanced to Stage 2, Group D.

==== Group 4 matches ====
- Mark Williams 2–2 Connor Benzey
- David Grace 3–1 Fergal Quinn
- David Grace 1–3 Connor Benzey
- Mark Williams 3–0 Fergal Quinn
- Fergal Quinn 1–3 Connor Benzey
- Mark Williams 3–0 David Grace

==== Group 4 table ====
Pos.	Player	P	W	D	L	FW	FL	FD	HB	Pts.
1	Mark Williams (WAL) (4)	3	2	1	0	8	2	+6	115	7
2	Connor Benzey (ENG) (a)	3	2	1	0	8	4	+4	67	7
3	David Grace (ENG) (48)	3	1	0	2	4	7	−3	50	3
4	Fergal Quinn (NIR) (a)	3	0	0	3	2	9	−7	75	0

=== Group 5 ===
Group 5 was played on 26 June. Ali Carter won the group and advanced to Stage 2, Group E.

==== Group 5 matches ====
- Ali Carter 2–2 Joshua Thomond
- Xing Zihao 3–0 Kreishh Gurbaxani
- Xing Zihao 3–1 Joshua Thomond
- Ali Carter 3–1 Kreishh Gurbaxani
- Kreishh Gurbaxani 1–3 Joshua Thomond
- Ali Carter 3–1 Xing Zihao

==== Group 5 table ====
Pos.	Player	P	W	D	L	FW	FL	FD	HB	Pts.
1	Ali Carter (ENG) (5)	3	2	1	0	8	4	+4	87	7
2	Xing Zihao (CHN) (62)	3	2	0	1	7	4	+3	127	6
3	Joshua Thomond (ENG) (a)	3	1	1	1	6	6	0	64	4
4	Kreishh Gurbaxani (IND) (101)	3	0	0	3	2	9	−7	64	0

=== Group 6 ===
Group 6 was played on 24 June. Gary Wilson won the group and advanced to Stage 2, Group F.

==== Group 6 matches ====
- Gary Wilson 3–0 Huang Jiahao
- Joe Perry 2–2 Michael Holt
- Joe Perry 3–1 Huang Jiahao
- Gary Wilson 3–1 Michael Holt
- Michael Holt 3–1 Huang Jiahao
- Gary Wilson 2–2 Joe Perry

==== Group 6 table ====
Pos.	Player	P	W	D	L	FW	FL	FD	HB	Pts.
1	Gary Wilson (ENG) (6)	3	2	1	0	8	3	+5	97	7
2	Joe Perry (ENG) (34)	3	1	2	0	7	5	+2	95	5
3	Michael Holt (ENG) (84)	3	1	1	1	6	6	0	90	4
4	Huang Jiahao (CHN) (97)	3	0	0	3	2	9	−7	119	0

=== Group 7 ===
Group 7 was played on 17 June. Robbie McGuigan won the group and advanced to Stage 2, Group G.

==== Group 7 matches ====
- Tom Ford w/d–w/o Barry Pinches
- Sanderson Lam 0–3 Robbie McGuigan
- Sanderson Lam 3–1 Barry Pinches
- Tom Ford w/d–w/o Robbie McGuigan
- Robbie McGuigan 1–3 Barry Pinches
- Tom Ford w/d–w/o Sanderson Lam

Note: w/o = walkover; w/d = withdrawn.

==== Group 7 table ====
Pos.	Player	P	W	D	L	FW	FL	FD	HB	Pts.
1	Robbie McGuigan (NIR) (93)	3	2	0	1	4	3	+1	46	6
2	Barry Pinches (ENG) (a)	3	2	0	1	4	4	0	84	6
3	Sanderson Lam (ENG) (49)	3	2	0	1	3	4	−1	89	6
4	Tom Ford (ENG) (7)	3	0	0	3	0	0	0	69	0

Note: Tom Ford lost his first match 1‍–‍3 to Barry Pinches, and then withdrew for medical reasons.

=== Group 8 ===
Group 8 was played on 17 June. Jak Jones won the group and advanced to Stage 2, Group H.

==== Group 8 matches ====
- Jak Jones 2–2 Antoni Kowalski
- Jordan Brown 3–1 Bulcsú Révész
- Jordan Brown 2–2 Antoni Kowalski
- Jak Jones 3–1 Bulcsú Révész
- Bulcsú Révész 2–2 Antoni Kowalski
- Jak Jones 2–2 Jordan Brown

==== Group 8 table ====
Pos.	Player	P	W	D	L	FW	FL	FD	HB	Pts.
1	Jak Jones (WAL) (8)	3	1	2	0	7	5	+2	88	5
2	Jordan Brown (NIR) (32)	3	1	2	0	7	5	+2	87	5
3	Antoni Kowalski (POL) (99)	3	0	3	0	6	6	0	93	3
4	Bulcsú Révész (HUN) (95)	3	0	1	2	4	8	−4	76	1

Note: Jak Jones and Jordan Brown finished Group 8 equal on points and frame difference. Their head‑to‑head was a draw. Jones made a higher break (88) and so was placed above Brown in the group.

=== Group 9 ===
Group 9 was played on 24 June. Ma Hailong won the group and advanced to Stage 2, Group H.

==== Group 9 matches ====
- John Higgins 3–0 Artemijs Žižins
- Ma Hailong 2–2 Ben Mertens
- Ma Hailong 3–0 Artemijs Žižins
- John Higgins 0–3 Ben Mertens
- Ben Mertens 0–3 Artemijs Žižins
- John Higgins 2–2 Ma Hailong

==== Group 9 table ====
Pos.	Player	P	W	D	L	FW	FL	FD	HB	Pts.
1	Ma Hailong (CHN) (63)	3	1	2	0	7	4	+3	111	5
2	Ben Mertens (BEL) (89)	3	1	1	1	5	5	0	86	4
3	John Higgins (SCO) (9)	3	1	1	1	5	5	0	120	4
4	Artemijs Žižins (LVA) (102)	3	1	0	2	3	6	−3	78	3

Note: Ben Mertens and John Higgins finished Group 9 equal on points and frame difference. Mertens won their head‑to‑head and so was placed above Higgins in the group.

=== Group 10 ===
Group 10 was played on 14 June. Jackson Page won the group and advanced to Stage 2, Group G.

==== Group 10 matches ====
- Robert Milkins 2–2 Iulian Boiko
- Jackson Page 2–2 Andrew Higginson
- Jackson Page 2–2 Iulian Boiko
- Robert Milkins 2–2 Andrew Higginson
- Andrew Higginson 3–1 Iulian Boiko
- Robert Milkins 1–3 Jackson Page

==== Group 10 table ====
Pos.	Player	P	W	D	L	FW	FL	FD	HB	Pts.
1	Jackson Page (WAL) (33)	3	1	2	0	7	5	+2	127	5
2	Andrew Higginson (ENG) (68)	3	1	2	0	7	5	+2	121	5
3	Iulian Boiko (UKR) (a)	3	0	2	1	5	7	−2	107	2
4	Robert Milkins (ENG) (10)	3	0	2	1	5	7	−2	89	2

Note: Jackson Page and Andrew Higginson finished Group 10 equal on points and frame difference. Their head‑to‑head was a draw. Page made a higher break (127) and so was placed above Higginson in the group.
Note: Iulian Boiko and Robert Milkins finished Group 10 equal on points and frame difference. Their head‑to‑head was a draw. Boiko made a higher break (107) and so was placed above Milkins in the group.

=== Group 11 ===
Group 11 was played on 10 June. Ryan Day won the group and advanced to Stage 2, Group F.

==== Group 11 matches ====
- Ryan Day 3–0 Liam Davies
- Marco Fu 2–2 Hammad Miah
- Marco Fu 1–3 Liam Davies
- Ryan Day 2–2 Hammad Miah
- Hammad Miah 2–2 Liam Davies
- Ryan Day 3–0 Marco Fu

==== Group 11 table ====
Pos.	Player	P	W	D	L	FW	FL	FD	HB	Pts.
1	Ryan Day (WAL) (11)	3	2	1	0	8	2	+6	125	7
2	Liam Davies (WAL) (91)	3	1	1	1	5	6	−1	95	4
3	Hammad Miah (ENG) (69)	3	0	3	0	6	6	0	52	3
4	Marco Fu (HKG) (55)	3	0	1	2	3	8	−5	64	1

=== Group 12 ===
Group 12 was played on 25 June. Jack Lisowski won the group and advanced to Stage 2, Group E.

==== Group 12 matches ====
- Jack Lisowski 3–0 Anton Kazakov
- Mark Davis 2–2 Jiang Jun
- Mark Davis 3–1 Anton Kazakov
- Jack Lisowski 3–1 Jiang Jun
- Jiang Jun 2–2 Anton Kazakov
- Jack Lisowski 2–2 Mark Davis

==== Group 12 table ====
Pos.	Player	P	W	D	L	FW	FL	FD	HB	Pts.
1	Jack Lisowski (ENG) (12)	3	2	1	0	8	3	+5	138	7
2	Mark Davis (ENG) (44)	3	1	2	0	7	5	+2	89	5
3	Jiang Jun (CHN) (64)	3	0	2	1	5	7	−2	60	2
4	Anton Kazakov (UKR) (a)	3	0	1	2	3	8	−5	38	1

=== Group 13 ===
Group 13 was played on 21 June. Si Jiahui won the group and advanced to Stage 2, Group D.

==== Group 13 matches ====
- Si Jiahui 3–0 Peter Lines
- Jimmy Robertson 1–3 Zak Surety
- Jimmy Robertson 1–3 Peter Lines
- Si Jiahui 3–0 Zak Surety
- Zak Surety 1–3 Peter Lines
- Si Jiahui 3–1 Jimmy Robertson

==== Group 13 table ====
Pos.	Player	P	W	D	L	FW	FL	FD	HB	Pts.
1	Si Jiahui (CHN) (13)	3	3	0	0	9	1	+8	82	9
2	Peter Lines (ENG) (a)	3	2	0	1	6	5	+1	110	6
3	Zak Surety (ENG) (83)	3	1	0	2	4	7	−3	48	3
4	Jimmy Robertson (ENG) (36)	3	0	0	3	3	9	−6	49	0

=== Group 14 ===
Group 14 was played on 20 June. Hossein Vafaei won the group and advanced to Stage 2, Group C.

==== Group 14 matches ====
- Hossein Vafaei 3–0 Josh Mulholland
- Louis Heathcote 2–2 Manasawin Phetmalaikul
- Louis Heathcote 3–1 Josh Mulholland
- Hossein Vafaei 3–1 Manasawin Phetmalaikul
- Manasawin Phetmalaikul 0–3 Josh Mulholland
- Hossein Vafaei 3–0 Louis Heathcote

==== Group 14 table ====
Pos.	Player	P	W	D	L	FW	FL	FD	HB	Pts.
1	Hossein Vafaei (IRN) (14)	3	3	0	0	9	1	+8	89	9
2	Louis Heathcote (ENG) (57)	3	1	1	1	5	6	−1	74	4
3	Josh Mulholland (ENG) (a)	3	1	0	2	4	6	−2	51	3
4	Manasawin Phetmalaikul (THA) (78)	3	0	1	2	3	8	−5	80	1

=== Group 15 ===
Group 15 was played on 27 June. David Gilbert won the group and advanced to Stage 2, Group B.

==== Group 15 matches ====
- David Gilbert 2–2 Duane Jones
- Xu Si 2–2 Andrew Pagett
- Xu Si 2–2 Duane Jones
- David Gilbert 2–2 Andrew Pagett
- Andrew Pagett 2–2 Duane Jones
- David Gilbert 2–2 Xu Si

==== Group 15 table ====
Pos.	Player	P	W	D	L	FW	FL	FD	HB	Pts.
1	David Gilbert (ENG) (15)	3	0	3	0	6	6	0	136	3
2	Xu Si (CHN) (45)	3	0	3	0	6	6	0	131	3
3	Duane Jones (WAL) (86)	3	0	3	0	6	6	0	130	3
4	Andrew Pagett (WAL) (73)	3	0	3	0	6	6	0	100	3

Note: All four players finished Group 15 equal on points and frame difference. Their positions in the group were determined by their highest breaks.

=== Group 16 ===
Group 16 was played on 26 June. Fan Zhengyi won the group and advanced to Stage 2, Group A.

==== Group 16 matches ====
- Zhou Yuelong 2–2 Mink Nutcharut
- Fan Zhengyi 3–0 Alfie Burden
- Fan Zhengyi 2–2 Mink Nutcharut
- Zhou Yuelong 1–3 Alfie Burden
- Alfie Burden 3–0 Mink Nutcharut
- Zhou Yuelong 0–3 Fan Zhengyi

==== Group 16 table ====
Pos.	Player	P	W	D	L	FW	FL	FD	HB	Pts.
1	Fan Zhengyi (CHN) (37)	3	2	1	0	8	2	+6	121	7
2	Alfie Burden (ENG) (65)	3	2	0	1	6	4	+2	65	6
3	Mink Nutcharut (THA) (88)	3	0	2	1	4	7	−3	48	2
4	Zhou Yuelong (CHN) (16)	3	0	1	2	3	8	−5	107	1

=== Group 17 ===
Group 17 was played on 11 June. Chris Wakelin won the group and advanced to Stage 2, Group A.

==== Group 17 matches ====
- Chris Wakelin 3–0 Rory McLeod
- Ian Burns 3–0 Liam Pullen
- Ian Burns 2–2 Rory McLeod
- Chris Wakelin 3–0 Liam Pullen
- Liam Pullen 2–2 Rory McLeod
- Chris Wakelin 2–2 Ian Burns

==== Group 17 table ====
Pos.	Player	P	W	D	L	FW	FL	FD	HB	Pts.
1	Chris Wakelin (ENG) (17)	3	2	1	0	8	2	+6	84	7
2	Ian Burns (ENG) (60)	3	1	2	0	7	4	+3	116	5
3	Rory McLeod (JAM) (a)	3	0	2	1	4	7	−3	98	2
4	Liam Pullen (ENG) (67)	3	0	1	2	2	8	−6	104	1

=== Group 18 ===
Group 18 was played on 21 June. Stuart Bingham won the group and advanced to Stage 2, Group B.

==== Group 18 matches ====
- Stuart Bingham 2–2 Hamim Hussain
- Anthony Hamilton 3–0 Ahmed Aly Elsayed
- Anthony Hamilton 2–2 Hamim Hussain
- Stuart Bingham 3–0 Ahmed Aly Elsayed
- Ahmed Aly Elsayed 0–3 Hamim Hussain
- Stuart Bingham 3–1 Anthony Hamilton

==== Group 18 table ====
Pos.	Player	P	W	D	L	FW	FL	FD	HB	Pts.
1	Stuart Bingham (ENG) (18)	3	2	1	0	8	3	+5	110	7
2	Hamim Hussain (ENG) (a)	3	1	2	0	7	4	+3	108	5
3	Anthony Hamilton (ENG) (40)	3	1	1	1	6	5	+1	71	4
4	Ahmed Aly Elsayed (USA) (80)	3	0	0	3	0	9	−9	34	0

=== Group 19 ===
Group 19 was played on 22 June. Long Zehuang won the group and advanced to Stage 2, Group C.

==== Group 19 matches ====
- Jamie O'Neill 2–2 Alfie Davies
- Long Zehuang 3–1 Lei Peifan
- Long Zehuang 3–1 Alfie Davies
- Jamie O'Neill 0–3 Lei Peifan
- Lei Peifan 1–3 Alfie Davies
- Jamie O'Neill 1–3 Long Zehuang

==== Group 19 table ====
Pos.	Player	P	W	D	L	FW	FL	FD	HB	Pts.
1	Long Zehuang (CHN) (59)	3	3	0	0	9	3	+6	98	9
2	Alfie Davies (WAL) (a)	3	1	1	1	6	6	0	50	4
3	Lei Peifan (CHN) (92)	3	1	0	2	5	6	−1	57	3
4	Jamie O'Neill (ENG) (a)	3	0	1	2	3	8	−5	74	1

=== Group 20 ===
Group 20 was played on 22 June. Stuart Carrington won the group and advanced to Stage 2, Group D.

==== Group 20 matches ====
- Pang Junxu 2–2 Gerard Greene
- Stuart Carrington 3–1 Gong Chenzhi
- Stuart Carrington 3–0 Gerard Greene
- Pang Junxu 3–1 Gong Chenzhi
- Gong Chenzhi 3–1 Gerard Greene
- Pang Junxu 2–2 Stuart Carrington

==== Group 20 table ====
Pos.	Player	P	W	D	L	FW	FL	FD	HB	Pts.
1	Stuart Carrington (ENG) (58)	3	2	1	0	8	3	+5	107	7
2	Pang Junxu (CHN) (19)	3	1	2	0	7	5	+2	84	5
3	Gong Chenzhi (CHN) (94)	3	1	0	2	5	7	−2	128	3
4	Gerard Greene (NIR) (a)	3	0	1	2	3	8	−5	44	1

=== Group 21 ===
Group 21 was played on 10 June. Neil Robertson won the group and advanced to Stage 2, Group E.

Note: Robertson later withdrew from Group E.

==== Group 21 matches ====
- Neil Robertson 2–2 Zack Richardson
- Jamie Clarke 2–2 Cheung Ka Wai
- Jamie Clarke 3–1 Zack Richardson
- Neil Robertson 3–0 Cheung Ka Wai
- Cheung Ka Wai 3–0 Zack Richardson
- Neil Robertson 3–1 Jamie Clarke

==== Group 21 table ====
Pos.	Player	P	W	D	L	FW	FL	FD	HB	Pts.
1	Neil Robertson (AUS) (20)	3	2	1	0	8	3	+5	93	7
2	Cheung Ka Wai (HKG) (100)	3	1	1	1	5	5	0	107	4
3	Jamie Clarke (WAL) (46)	3	1	1	1	6	6	0	90	4
4	Zack Richardson (ENG) (a)	3	0	1	2	3	8	−5	90	1

Note: Cheung Ka Wai and Jamie Clarke finished Group 21 equal on points and frame difference. Their head‑to‑head was a draw. Cheung made a higher break (107) and so was placed above Clarke in the group.

=== Group 22 ===
Group 22 was played on 13 June. Joe O'Connor won the group and advanced to Stage 2, Group F.

==== Group 22 matches ====
- Joe O'Connor 2–2 Harvey Chandler
- Aaron Hill 3–1 Oliver Lines
- Aaron Hill 2–2 Harvey Chandler
- Joe O'Connor 3–1 Oliver Lines
- Oliver Lines 2–2 Harvey Chandler
- Joe O'Connor 2–2 Aaron Hill

==== Group 22 table ====
Pos.	Player	P	W	D	L	FW	FL	FD	HB	Pts.
1	Joe O'Connor (ENG) (21)	3	1	2	0	7	5	+2	130	5
2	Aaron Hill (IRL) (47)	3	1	2	0	7	5	+2	74	5
3	Harvey Chandler (ENG) (a)	3	0	3	0	6	6	0	68	3
4	Oliver Lines (ENG) (87)	3	0	1	2	4	8	−4	99	1

Note: Joe O'Connor and Aaron Hill finished Group 22 equal on points and frame difference. Their head‑to‑head was a draw. O'Connor made a higher break (130) and so was placed above Hill in the group.

=== Group 23 ===
Group 23 was played on 13 June. Michael White won the group and advanced to Stage 2, Group G.

==== Group 23 matches ====
- Stephen Maguire 0–3 Ryan Davies
- Michael White 3–0 Dean Young
- Michael White 3–0 Ryan Davies
- Stephen Maguire 3–1 Dean Young
- Dean Young 1–3 Ryan Davies
- Stephen Maguire 2–2 Michael White

==== Group 23 table ====
Pos.	Player	P	W	D	L	FW	FL	FD	HB	Pts.
1	Michael White (WAL) (42)	3	2	1	0	8	2	+6	122	7
2	Ryan Davies (ENG) (a)	3	2	0	1	6	4	+2	76	6
3	Stephen Maguire (SCO) (22)	3	1	1	1	5	6	−1	111	4
4	Dean Young (SCO) (75)	3	0	0	3	2	9	−7	63	0

=== Group 24 ===
Group 24 was played on 18 June. Martin O'Donnell won the group and advanced to Stage 2, Group H.

==== Group 24 matches ====
- Ricky Walden 3–0 Umut Dikme
- Martin O'Donnell 2–2 Rory Thor
- Martin O'Donnell 3–1 Umut Dikme
- Ricky Walden 3–1 Rory Thor
- Rory Thor 2–2 Umut Dikme
- Ricky Walden 1–3 Martin O'Donnell

==== Group 24 table ====
Pos.	Player	P	W	D	L	FW	FL	FD	HB	Pts.
1	Martin O'Donnell (ENG) (50)	3	2	1	0	8	4	+4	94	7
2	Ricky Walden (ENG) (23)	3	2	0	1	7	4	+3	121	6
3	Rory Thor (MAS) (70)	3	0	2	1	5	7	−2	113	2
4	Umut Dikme (GER) (a)	3	0	1	2	3	8	−5	91	1

=== Group 25 ===
Group 25 was played on 12 June. Matthew Stevens won the group and advanced to Stage 2, Group H.

==== Group 25 matches ====
- Robbie Williams 0–3 Farakh Ajaib
- Matthew Stevens 3–0 Haydon Pinhey
- Matthew Stevens 2–2 Farakh Ajaib
- Robbie Williams 3–0 Haydon Pinhey
- Haydon Pinhey 3–0 Farakh Ajaib
- Robbie Williams 1–3 Matthew Stevens

==== Group 25 table ====
Pos.	Player	P	W	D	L	FW	FL	FD	HB	Pts.
1	Matthew Stevens (WAL) (35)	3	2	1	0	8	3	+5	97	7
2	Farakh Ajaib (PAK) (85)	3	1	1	1	5	5	0	93	4
3	Robbie Williams (ENG) (24)	3	1	0	2	4	6	−2	129	3
4	Haydon Pinhey (ENG) (90)	3	1	0	2	3	6	−3	65	3

=== Group 26 ===
Group 26 was played on 19 June. Alexander Ursenbacher won the group and advanced to Stage 2, Group G.

==== Group 26 matches ====
- Matthew Selt 2–2 Florian Nüßle
- Graeme Dott 2–2 Alexander Ursenbacher
- Graeme Dott 2–2 Florian Nüßle
- Matthew Selt 2–2 Alexander Ursenbacher
- Alexander Ursenbacher 3–0 Florian Nüßle
- Matthew Selt 2–2 Graeme Dott

==== Group 26 table ====
Pos.	Player	P	W	D	L	FW	FL	FD	HB	Pts.
1	Alexander Ursenbacher (SUI) (71)	3	1	2	0	7	4	+3	121	5
2	Matthew Selt (ENG) (25)	3	0	3	0	6	6	0	119	3
3	Graeme Dott (SCO) (41)	3	0	3	0	6	6	0	106	3
4	Florian Nüßle (AUT) (a)	3	0	2	1	4	7	−3	87	2

Note: Matthew Selt and Graeme Dott finished Group 26 equal on points and frame difference. Their head‑to‑head was a draw. Selt made a higher break (119) and so was placed above Dott in the group.

=== Group 27 ===
Group 27 was played on 19 June. David Lilley won the group and advanced to Stage 2, Group F.

==== Group 27 matches ====
- Yuan Sijun 3–0 Paul Deaville
- David Lilley 3–0 Liam Graham
- David Lilley 3–0 Paul Deaville
- Yuan Sijun 2–2 Liam Graham
- Liam Graham 2–2 Paul Deaville
- Yuan Sijun 1–3 David Lilley

==== Group 27 table ====
Pos.	Player	P	W	D	L	FW	FL	FD	HB	Pts.
1	David Lilley (ENG) (51)	3	3	0	0	9	1	+8	85	9
2	Yuan Sijun (CHN) (26)	3	1	1	1	6	5	+1	132	4
3	Liam Graham (SCO) (74)	3	0	2	1	4	7	−3	80	2
4	Paul Deaville (ENG) (a)	3	0	1	2	2	8	−6	58	1

=== Group 28 ===
Group 28 was played on 18 June. Wu Yize won the group and advanced to Stage 2, Group E.

==== Group 28 matches ====
- Wu Yize 3–1 Joshua Cooper
- Ross Muir 3–1 Allan Taylor
- Ross Muir 2–2 Joshua Cooper
- Wu Yize 3–1 Allan Taylor
- Allan Taylor 3–0 Joshua Cooper
- Wu Yize 3–1 Ross Muir

==== Group 28 table ====
Pos.	Player	P	W	D	L	FW	FL	FD	HB	Pts.
1	Wu Yize (CHN) (27)	3	3	0	0	9	3	+6	142	9
2	Ross Muir (SCO) (61)	3	1	1	1	6	6	0	80	4
3	Allan Taylor (ENG) (81)	3	1	0	2	5	6	−1	79	3
4	Joshua Cooper (ENG) (a)	3	0	1	2	3	8	−5	75	1

=== Group 29 ===
Group 29 was played on 15 June. Ben Woollaston won the group and advanced to Stage 2, Group D.

==== Group 29 matches ====
- Dominic Dale 3–1 Dylan Emery
- Ben Woollaston 2–2 Stan Moody
- Ben Woollaston 3–0 Dylan Emery
- Dominic Dale 2–2 Stan Moody
- Stan Moody 3–1 Dylan Emery
- Dominic Dale 1–3 Ben Woollaston

==== Group 29 table ====
Pos.	Player	P	W	D	L	FW	FL	FD	HB	Pts.
1	Ben Woollaston (ENG) (43)	3	2	1	0	8	3	+5	76	7
2	Stan Moody (ENG) (72)	3	1	2	0	7	5	+2	73	5
3	Dominic Dale (WAL) (28)	3	1	1	1	6	6	0	89	4
4	Dylan Emery (WAL) (a)	3	0	0	3	2	9	−7	57	0

=== Group 30 ===
Group 30 was played on 15 June. Jamie Jones won the group and advanced to Stage 2, Group C.

==== Group 30 matches ====
- Jamie Jones 3–0 Chris Totten
- Liu Hongyu 1–3 Ishpreet Singh Chadha
- Liu Hongyu 1–3 Chris Totten
- Jamie Jones 2–2 Ishpreet Singh Chadha
- Ishpreet Singh Chadha 2–2 Chris Totten
- Jamie Jones 2–2 Liu Hongyu

==== Group 30 table ====
Pos.	Player	P	W	D	L	FW	FL	FD	HB	Pts.
1	Jamie Jones (WAL) (29)	3	1	2	0	7	4	+3	124	5
2	Ishpreet Singh Chadha (IND) (66)	3	1	2	0	7	5	+2	137	5
3	Chris Totten (SCO) (98)	3	1	1	1	5	6	−1	132	4
4	Liu Hongyu (CHN) (54)	3	0	1	2	4	8	−4	68	1

=== Group 31 ===
Group 31 was played on 12 June. Ashley Carty won the group and advanced to Stage 2, Group B.

==== Group 31 matches ====
- Elliot Slessor 3–0 Simon Blackwell
- Ashley Carty 3–0 Mostafa Dorgham
- Ashley Carty 3–1 Simon Blackwell
- Elliot Slessor 3–0 Mostafa Dorgham
- Mostafa Dorgham 2–2 Simon Blackwell
- Elliot Slessor 0–3 Ashley Carty

==== Group 31 table ====
Pos.	Player	P	W	D	L	FW	FL	FD	HB	Pts.
1	Ashley Carty (ENG) (56)	3	3	0	0	9	1	+8	81	9
2	Elliot Slessor (ENG) (30)	3	2	0	1	6	3	+3	106	6
3	Simon Blackwell (ENG) (a)	3	0	1	2	3	8	−5	78	1
4	Mostafa Dorgham (EGY) (76)	3	0	1	2	2	8	−6	28	1

=== Group 32 ===
Group 32 was played on 14 June. Thepchaiya Un-Nooh won the group and advanced to Stage 2, Group A.

==== Group 32 matches ====
- Thepchaiya Un-Nooh 3–1 Mark Joyce
- Daniel Wells 2–2 Julien Leclercq
- Daniel Wells 3–1 Mark Joyce
- Thepchaiya Un-Nooh 3–0 Julien Leclercq
- Julien Leclercq 0–3 Mark Joyce
- Thepchaiya Un-Nooh 2–2 Daniel Wells

==== Group 32 table ====
Pos.	Player	P	W	D	L	FW	FL	FD	HB	Pts.
1	Thepchaiya Un-Nooh (THA) (31)	3	2	1	0	8	3	+5	106	7
2	Daniel Wells (WAL) (53)	3	1	2	0	7	5	+2	138	5
3	Mark Joyce (ENG) (a)	3	1	0	2	5	6	−1	107	3
4	Julien Leclercq (BEL) (96)	3	0	1	2	2	8	−6	116	1

== Stage two ==
Stage two consisted of eight groups, each having four players. Numbers in parentheses after the players' names denote the players' seeding.

=== Order of play ===
Order of play as follows:

Date	Group
28 June	Group B
28 June	Group C
29 June	Group A
29 June	Group E

Date	Group
1 July	Group D
1 July	Group H
2 July	Group F
2 July	Group G

=== Group A ===
Group A was played on 29 June. Scott Donaldson won the group and advanced to Stage 3, Winners' group 1.

==== Group A matches ====
- Chris Wakelin 1–3 Scott Donaldson
- Thepchaiya Un-Nooh 2–2 Fan Zhengyi
- Thepchaiya Un-Nooh 0–3 Scott Donaldson
- Chris Wakelin 0–3 Fan Zhengyi
- Fan Zhengyi 2–2 Scott Donaldson
- Chris Wakelin 1–3 Thepchaiya Un-Nooh

==== Group A table ====
Pos.	Player	P	W	D	L	FW	FL	FD	HB	Pts.
1	Scott Donaldson (SCO) (38)	3	2	1	0	8	3	+5	106	7
2	Fan Zhengyi (CHN) (37)	3	1	2	0	7	4	+3	73	5
3	Thepchaiya Un-Nooh (THA) (31)	3	1	1	1	5	6	−1	101	4
4	Chris Wakelin (ENG) (17)	3	0	0	3	2	9	−7	53	0

=== Group B ===
Group B was played on 28 June. David Gilbert won the group and advanced to Stage 3, Winners' group 2.

==== Group B matches ====
- David Gilbert 3–1 Ashley Carty
- Stuart Bingham 3–1 He Guoqiang
- Stuart Bingham 2–2 Ashley Carty
- David Gilbert 3–1 He Guoqiang
- He Guoqiang 3–1 Ashley Carty
- David Gilbert 3–0 Stuart Bingham

==== Group B table ====
Pos.	Player	P	W	D	L	FW	FL	FD	HB	Pts.
1	David Gilbert (ENG) (15)	3	3	0	0	9	2	+7	132	9
2	Stuart Bingham (ENG) (18)	3	1	1	1	5	6	−1	141	4
3	He Guoqiang (CHN) (52)	3	1	0	2	5	7	−2	124	3
4	Ashley Carty (ENG) (56)	3	0	1	2	4	8	−4	130	1

=== Group C ===
Group C was played on 28 June. Long Zehuang won the group and advanced to Stage 3, Winners' group 2.

==== Group C matches ====
- Shaun Murphy 3–1 Long Zehuang
- Hossein Vafaei 3–1 Jamie Jones
- Hossein Vafaei 0–3 Long Zehuang
- Shaun Murphy 3–0 Jamie Jones
- Jamie Jones 0–3 Long Zehuang
- Shaun Murphy 0–3 Hossein Vafaei

==== Group C table ====
Pos.	Player	P	W	D	L	FW	FL	FD	HB	Pts.
1	Long Zehuang (CHN) (59)	3	2	0	1	7	3	+4	77	6
2	Hossein Vafaei (IRN) (14)	3	2	0	1	6	4	+2	129	6
3	Shaun Murphy (ENG) (3)	3	2	0	1	6	4	+2	84	6
4	Jamie Jones (WAL) (29)	3	0	0	3	1	9	−8	61	0

Note: Hossein Vafaei and Shaun Murphy finished Group C equal on points and frame difference. Vafaei won their head‑to‑head and so was placed above Murphy in the group.

=== Group D ===
Group D was played on 1 July. Mark Williams won the group and advanced to Stage 3, Winners' group 1.

==== Group D matches ====
- Mark Williams 2–2 Stuart Carrington
- Si Jiahui 2–2 Ben Woollaston
- Si Jiahui 2–2 Stuart Carrington
- Mark Williams 2–2 Ben Woollaston
- Ben Woollaston 3–1 Stuart Carrington
- Mark Williams 3–0 Si Jiahui

==== Group D table ====
Pos.	Player	P	W	D	L	FW	FL	FD	HB	Pts.
1	Mark Williams (WAL) (4)	3	1	2	0	7	4	+3	130	5
2	Ben Woollaston (ENG) (43)	3	1	2	0	7	5	+2	82	5
3	Stuart Carrington (ENG) (58)	3	0	2	1	5	7	−2	77	2
4	Si Jiahui (CHN) (13)	3	0	2	1	4	7	−3	91	2

=== Group E ===
Group E was played on 29 June. Neil Robertson withdrew from the tournament and so the remaining three players faced each other twice. Ali Carter won the group and advanced to Stage 3, Winners' group 1.

==== Group E matches ====
- Ali Carter 2–2 Wu Yize
- Jack Lisowski 0–3 Wu Yize
- Ali Carter 3–1 Jack Lisowski
- Ali Carter 2–2 Wu Yize
- Jack Lisowski 3–0 Wu Yize
- Ali Carter 3–1 Jack Lisowski

==== Group E table ====
Pos.	Player	P	W	D	L	FW	FL	FD	HB	Pts.
1	Ali Carter (ENG) (5)	4	2	2	0	10	6	+4	130	8
2	Wu Yize (CHN) (27)	4	1	2	1	7	7	0	98	5
3	Jack Lisowski (ENG) (12)	4	1	0	3	5	9	−4	111	3

=== Group F ===
Group F was played on 2 July. David Lilley won the group and advanced to Stage 3, Winners' group 2.

==== Group F matches ====
- Gary Wilson 3–1 David Lilley
- Ryan Day 3–1 Joe O'Connor
- Ryan Day 1–3 David Lilley
- Gary Wilson 2–2 Joe O'Connor
- Joe O'Connor 0–3 David Lilley
- Gary Wilson 2–2 Ryan Day

==== Group F table ====
Pos.	Player	P	W	D	L	FW	FL	FD	HB	Pts.
1	David Lilley (ENG) (51)	3	2	0	1	7	4	+3	131	6
2	Gary Wilson (ENG) (6)	3	1	2	0	7	5	+2	114	5
3	Ryan Day (WAL) (11)	3	1	1	1	6	6	0	124	4
4	Joe O'Connor (ENG) (21)	3	0	1	2	3	8	−5	70	1

=== Group G ===
Group G was played on 2 July. Jackson Page won the group and advanced to Stage 3, Winners' group 2.

Note: A week after the tournament was completed Michael White had his WPBSA membership revoked on 12 July 2024.

==== Group G matches ====
- Jackson Page 2–2 Robbie McGuigan
- Michael White 1–3 Alexander Ursenbacher
- Michael White 0–3 Robbie McGuigan
- Jackson Page 3–1 Alexander Ursenbacher
- Alexander Ursenbacher 3–1 Robbie McGuigan
- Jackson Page 3–0 Michael White

==== Group G table ====
Pos.	Player	P	W	D	L	FW	FL	FD	HB	Pts.
1	Jackson Page (WAL) (33)	3	2	1	0	8	3	+5	89	7
2	Alexander Ursenbacher (SUI) (71)	3	2	0	1	7	5	+2	79	6
3	Robbie McGuigan (NIR) (93)	3	1	1	1	6	5	+1	51	4
4	Michael White (WAL) (42)	3	0	0	3	1	9	−8	75	0

=== Group H ===
Group H was played on 1 July. Martin O'Donnell won the group and advanced to Stage 3, Winners' group 1.

==== Group H matches ====
- Jak Jones 2–2 Ma Hailong
- Matthew Stevens 2–2 Martin O'Donnell
- Matthew Stevens 2–2 Ma Hailong
- Jak Jones 2–2 Martin O'Donnell
- Martin O'Donnell 3–1 Ma Hailong
- Jak Jones 2–2 Matthew Stevens

==== Group H table ====
Pos.	Player	P	W	D	L	FW	FL	FD	HB	Pts.
1	Martin O'Donnell (ENG) (50)	3	1	2	0	7	5	+2	138	5
2	Jak Jones (WAL) (8)	3	0	3	0	6	6	0	129	3
3	Matthew Stevens (WAL) (35)	3	0	3	0	6	6	0	93	3
4	Ma Hailong (CHN) (63)	3	0	2	1	5	7	−2	96	2

Note: Jak Jones and Matthew Stevens finished Group H equal on points and frame difference. Their head‑to‑head was a draw. Jones made a higher break (129) and so was placed above Stevens in the group.

== Stage three ==
Stage three consisted of two groups, each having four players.

=== Winners' group 1 ===
Winners' group 1 was played on 3 July. Ali Carter won the group and advanced to the final.

==== Winners' group 1 matches ====
- Mark Williams 3–0 Martin O'Donnell
- Ali Carter 3–0 Scott Donaldson
- Ali Carter 2–2 Martin O'Donnell
- Mark Williams 1–3 Scott Donaldson
- Scott Donaldson 3–1 Martin O'Donnell
- Mark Williams 1–3 Ali Carter

==== Winners' group 1 table ====
Pos.	Player	P	W	D	L	FW	FL	FD	HB	Pts.
1	Ali Carter (ENG) (5)	3	2	1	0	8	3	+5	118	7
2	Scott Donaldson (SCO) (38)	3	2	0	1	6	5	+1	79	6
3	Mark Williams (WAL) (4)	3	1	0	2	5	6	−1	139	3
4	Martin O'Donnell (ENG) (50)	3	0	1	2	3	8	−5	99	1

=== Winners' group 2 ===
Winners' group 2 was played on 3 July. Jackson Page won the group and advanced to the final.

==== Winners' group 2 matches ====
- David Gilbert 2–2 Long Zehuang
- Jackson Page 3–0 David Lilley
- Jackson Page 2–2 Long Zehuang
- David Gilbert 3–1 David Lilley
- David Lilley 2–2 Long Zehuang
- David Gilbert 2–2 Jackson Page

==== Winners' group 2 table ====
Pos.	Player	P	W	D	L	FW	FL	FD	HB	Pts.
1	Jackson Page (WAL) (33)	3	1	2	0	7	4	+3	75	5
2	David Gilbert (ENG) (15)	3	1	2	0	7	5	+2	135	5
3	Long Zehuang (CHN) (59)	3	0	3	0	6	6	0	134	3
4	David Lilley (ENG) (51)	3	0	1	2	3	8	−5	91	1

=== Final ===
Final: Best‑of‑five frames. Referee: Marcel Eckardt; Leicester Arena, Leicester, England, 3 July 2024
Ali Carter (5); England	3–1	Jackson Page (33); Wales
Frame scores: 116–18 (116), 0–83, 96–0, 79–0
116	Highest break	83
1	Century breaks	0

== Century breaks ==
A total of 95 century breaks were made in the tournament, 64 in Stage 1, 23 in Stage 2, and 8 in Stage 3.

- 142 – Wu Yize
- 141, 110 – Stuart Bingham
- 139, 130, 115, 112, 101 – Mark Williams
- 138, 133 – Martin O'Donnell
- 138, 127, 111, 106 – Jack Lisowski
- 138 – Daniel Wells
- 137 – Ishpreet Singh Chadha
- 136, 135, 132, 108, 105 – David Gilbert
- 134, 101 – Long Zehuang
- 132, 101 – Chris Totten
- 132 – Yuan Sijun
- 131, 103 – Xu Si
- 131 – David Lilley
- 130, 120, 118, 116 – Ali Carter
- 130, 106, 103 – Ashley Carty
- 130, 105 – Joe O'Connor
- 130 – Duane Jones
- 129, 125, 104 – Jak Jones
- 129 – Hossein Vafaei
- 129 – Robbie Williams
- 128, 101 – Gong Chenzhi
- 127, 116 – Jackson Page
- 127 – Xing Zihao
- 126, 119, 111 – Kyren Wilson
- 125, 124 – Ryan Day
- 124, 118 – He Guoqiang
- 124 – Jamie Jones
- 122 – Michael White
- 121, 113 – Fan Zhengyi
- 121 – Andrew Higginson
- 121 – Alexander Ursenbacher
- 121 – Ricky Walden
- 120 – John Higgins
- 119, 110, 102 – Matthew Selt
- 119 – Huang Jiahao
- 116, 113 – Ian Burns
- 116 – Julien Leclercq
- 114, 106 – Gary Wilson
- 113 – Rory Thor
- 111, 103 – Ma Hailong
- 111 – Stephen Maguire
- 110 – Peter Lines
- 108, 100 – Hamim Hussain
- 107 – Iulian Boiko
- 107 – Stuart Carrington
- 107 – Cheung Ka Wai
- 107 – Mark Joyce
- 107 – Zhou Yuelong
- 106, 104, 101 – Thepchaiya Un-Nooh
- 106, 101 – Scott Donaldson
- 106 – Graeme Dott
- 106 – Elliot Slessor
- 104 – Liam Pullen
- 100 – Shaun Murphy
- 100 – Andrew Pagett
