= 2023 Scottish Open (snooker) =

Snooker tournament

2023 BetVictor Scottish Open

Tournament information
- Dates: 11–17 December 2023
- Venue: Meadowbank Sports Centre
- City: Edinburgh
- Country: Scotland
- Organisation: World Snooker Tour
- Format: Ranking event
- Total prize fund: £427,000
- Winner's share: £80,000
- Highest break: Stuart Bingham (ENG) (145)
- Defending champion: Gary Wilson (ENG)

Final
- Champion: Gary Wilson (ENG)
- Runner-up: Noppon Saengkham (THA)
- Score: 9–5

The 2023 Scottish Open (officially the 2023 BetVictor Scottish Open) was a professional snooker tournament that took place from 11 to 17 December 2023 at the Meadowbank Sports Centre in Edinburgh, Scotland. It was the tenth ranking event of the 2023–24 season (following the Snooker Shoot Out and preceding the World Grand Prix), the third tournament in the Home Nations Series (following the English Open and Northern Ireland Open and preceding the Welsh Open), and the sixth of eight tournaments in the season's European Series. Sponsored by BetVictor, the tournament was broadcast by Eurosport, Discovery+ and free to air on DMAX in the UK and Europe, and by other broadcasters worldwide. The winner received the Stephen Hendry trophy and £80,000 from a total prize fund of £427,000.

Qualification for the tournament took place from 30 October to 2 November at the Morningside Arena in Leicester. Qualifying matches involving the top 16 players in the world rankings and two Scottish wildcards were held over to be played at the main venue in Edinburgh. The world number one Ronnie O'Sullivan withdrew from the tournament before his held-over qualifying match against Liam Graham.

Gary Wilson was the defending champion, having defeated Joe O'Connor 9‍–‍2 in the final of the 2022 tournament. Wilson successfully retained the title, defeating first-time ranking finalist Noppon Saengkham 9‍–‍5 in the final to win the second ranking title of his career. The main stage of the tournament produced 59 century breaks, in addition to the 19 centuries made in the qualifying rounds. Stuart Bingham made the tournament's highest break, a 145 in his last-64 match against Manasawin Phetmalaikul.

== Format ==
The event took place from 11 to 17 December 2023 at the Meadowbank Sports Centre in Edinburgh, Scotland. All matches were played as the best of seven frames until the quarter-finals, which were best of nine. The semi-finals were best of eleven, and the final was a best-of-seventeen-frame match played over two sessions.

=== Broadcasters ===
The qualifying matches were broadcast by Discovery+ in Europe (including the UK); Migu, Youku, and Huya in China; and Matchroom.live in all other territories.

The main stage of the event was broadcast by Eurosport, Discovery+, and DMAX in Europe (including the UK and Ireland); Liaoning TV, Migu, and Huya in Mainland China; Now TV in Hong Kong; Astro SuperSport in Malaysia and Brunei; TrueVisions in Thailand; Sportcast in Taiwan; Premier Sports Network in the Philippines; Fastsports in Pakistan; and Matchroom.live in all other territories.

=== Prize fund ===
The tournament winner received the Stephen Hendry trophy. The breakdown of prize money for the event is shown below:

- Winner: £80,000
- Runner-up: £35,000
- Semi-final: £17,500
- Quarter-final: £11,000
- Last 16: £7,500
- Last 32: £4,500
- Last 64: £3,000
- Highest break: £5,000
- Total: £427,000

== Summary ==
=== Qualifying round ===
Qualifying for the event took place from 30 October to 2 November 2023 at the Morningside Arena in Leicester, England. All qualifying matches were the best of seven frames. The match between Chris Wakelin and Mark Joyce, due to be played on 30 October, was rescheduled to 31 October because of Wakelin's participation in the Northern Ireland Open final on 29 October. Wakelin defeated Joyce 4‍–‍2. Jimmy White recorded his first win of the season over Duane Jones, who replaced Marco Fu in the draw after Fu withdrew from the event. White won the match in a deciding frame. Scott Donaldson came from 1‍–‍3 down to beat Ashley Hugill in a decider, and James Cahill also defeated Stan Moody in a deciding frame.

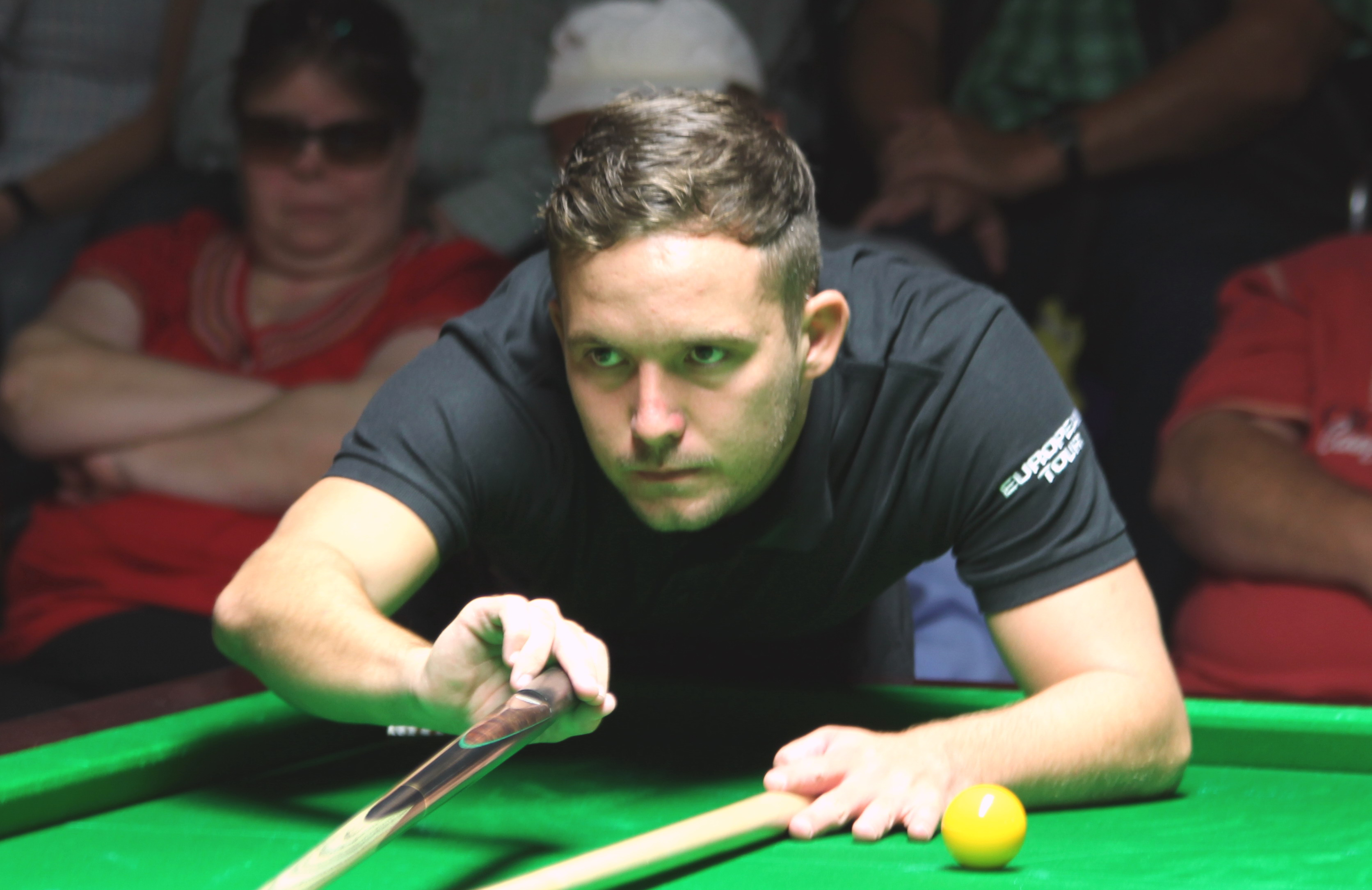
Jamie Jones (pictured in 2013) beat fifth seed Mark Allen 4‍–‍2 in the held-over qualifying round.

The held-over qualifying matches were played in Edinburgh on 11 December. That morning, the World Snooker Tour announced that the world number one Ronnie O'Sullivan had withdrawn from the event and would not play that afternoon as scheduled. His opponent Liam Graham received a walkover but criticised O'Sullivan for his late withdrawal, calling it "disrespectful." O'Sullivan responded that he had withdrawn the previous evening and said he "did not leave it to the last minute."

Ding Junhui defeated David Grace in a whitewash. Elliot Slessor made a century break of 104 to tie the scores at 3‍–‍3 against the defending champion Gary Wilson, but Wilson won the deciding frame with a 90 break. Sam Craigie lost the first three frames against the ninth seed Mark Williams but then won four in a row, making a century break of 126 in the deciding frame. The reigning World Champion Luca Brecel whitewashed Iulian Boiko having arrived at the venue just before the match, due to a delayed flight. The seventh seed Shaun Murphy lost 1‍–‍4 to Liu Hongyu, and the 16th seed Hossein Vafaei lost to Daniel Wells in a deciding frame. The 14th seed Barry Hawkins made century breaks of 127 and 100, but lost a deciding frame to Pang Junxu.

In the evening session, Mark Davis whitewashed the 12th seed Robert Milkins. Judd Trump, Jack Lisowski, and John Higgins also whitewashed their respective opponents Sydney Wilson, Mohamed Ibrahim, and Oliver Brown. World number two Trump stated afterward that being scheduled to play on tables two and three earlier in the season had given him "extra incentive" to return to the main table. Jamie Jones defeated fifth seed Mark Allen 4‍–‍2 with century breaks of 141 and 103.

=== Last 64 ===
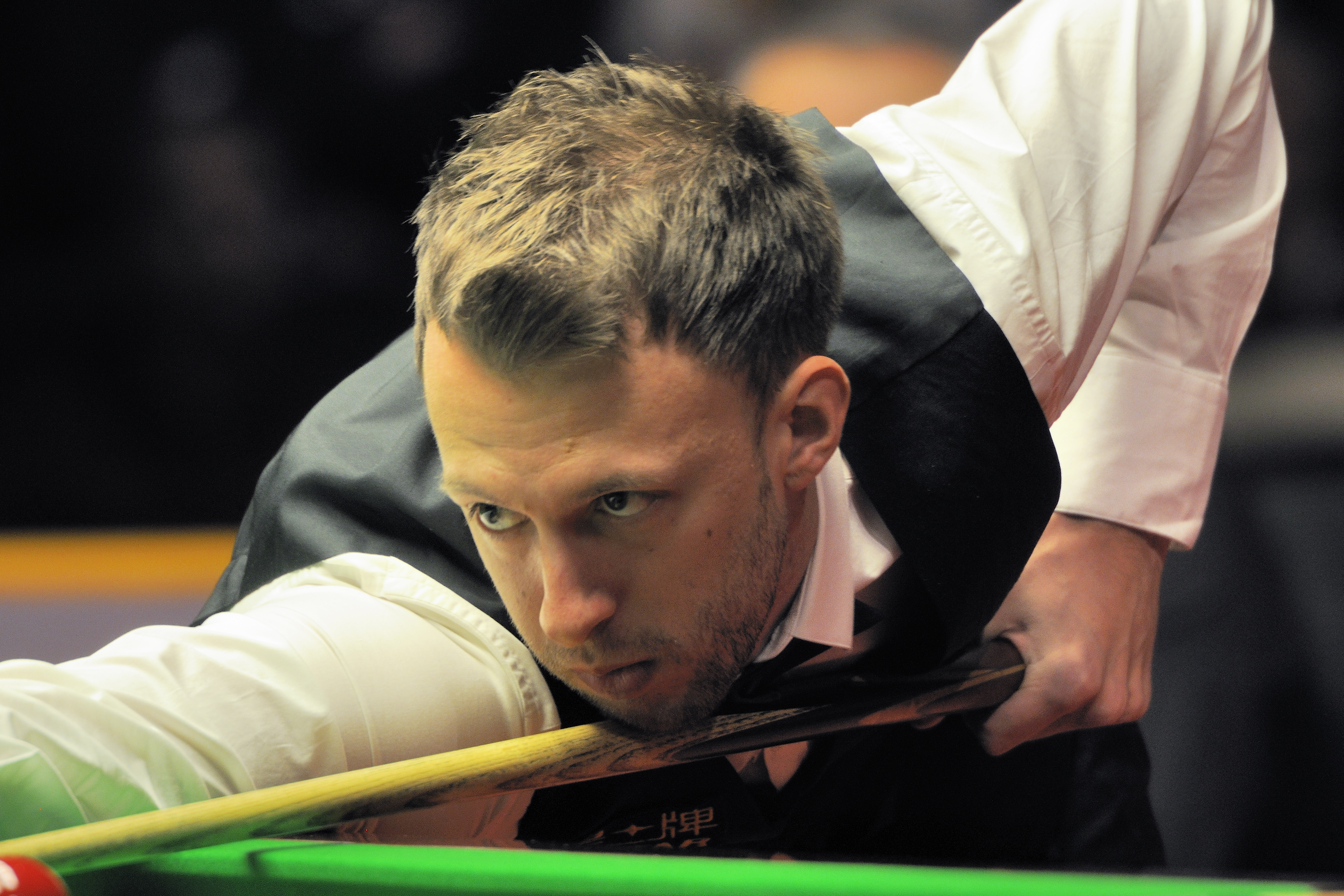
Judd Trump (pictured in 2014) was defeated 2‍–‍4 by Zhang Anda in the last 64.

The last-64 matches were played from 11 to 13 December. Martin Gould withdrew from the tournament, and his opponent Zhou Yuelong received a walkover. Zhang Anda defeated the fourth seed Trump 4‍–‍2. Brecel beat Cahill in a deciding frame, and Aaron Hill defeated the 13th seed Lisowski 4‍–‍1. Liu Hongyu and Lyu Haotian whitewashed their respective opponents Zak Surety and Jackson Page. He Guoqiang won the first frame against Higgins after needing two snookers, but Higgins took the next four to win 4‍–‍1. Higgins described some of his shots in the match as "amateurish" and "pathetic", commenting: "[I was] poor, really poor. I'm just lucky he didn't put me under any pressure really because I was all over the place."

Mark Selby made a century break of 115 in the second frame and led Matthew Stevens 3‍–‍2. Stevens won the sixth frame to take the match to a decider, which Selby won with a 64 break. The match between Jimmy Robertson and White went to a deciding frame after midnight, which White won on the last black. Thepchaiya Un-Nooh made two century breaks of 105 and 115 to lead Wakelin 2‍–‍0, but Wakelin defeated Thepchaiya Un-Nooh 4‍–‍2. The defending champion Gary Wilson trailed Xing Zihao 1‍–‍3, but won three frames in a row for a 4‍–‍3 victory. The previous year's runner-up Joe O'Connor defeated Donaldson 4‍–‍1. The 17th seed Ryan Day lost a deciding frame to Ashley Carty. The 20th seed Stuart Bingham whitewashed Manasawin Phetmalaikul, making a century of 145, the highest break of the tournament. Kyren Wilson made breaks of 126, 74, 129, and 106 to whitewash Jordan Brown, with Brown scoring just 13 points in the match.

=== Last 32 ===
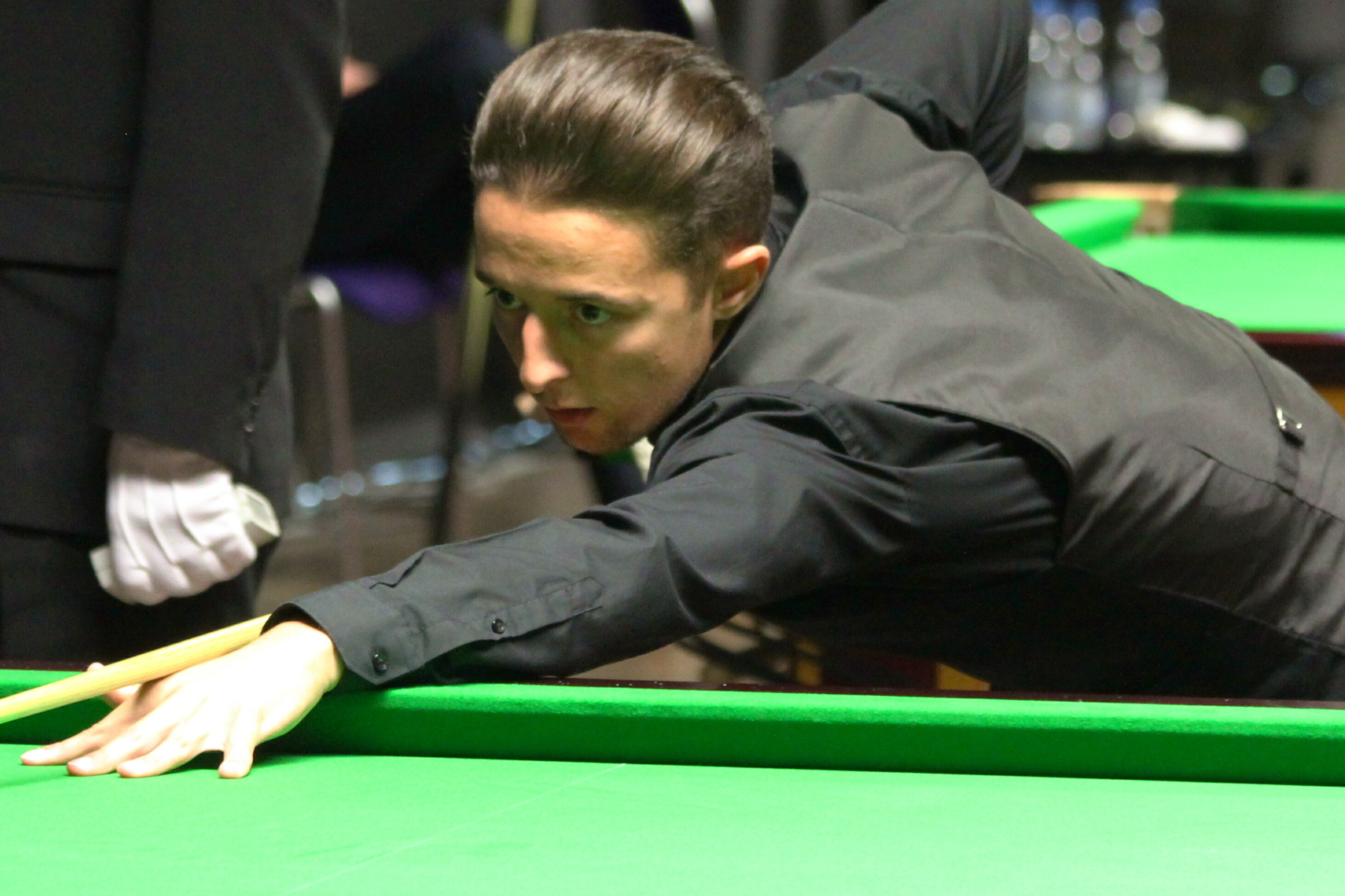
The previous year's runner-up Joe O'Connor (pictured in 2017) lost 3‍–‍4 to Gary Wilson in the last 32.

The last-32 matches were played from 13 to 14 December. Noppon Saengkham took a 3–1 lead over the 11th seed Ali Carter. Carter made a total clearance of 138 to win the fifth frame, but Saengkham made a 79 break in the sixth for a 4‍–‍2 victory. Facing Brecel, the world number 80 Martin O'Donnell made breaks of 59, 75, and 70 as he took a 3–1 lead. Brecel took the 44-minute fifth frame, but O'Donnell made an 85 break in frame six to win the match 4–2. "Out there playing the World Champion on the main stage and to score like I did was great," said O'Donnell afterwards. O'Donnell's win meant that he had beaten Brecel in all three professional matches they had played.

Matthew Selt trailed Selby 1–3 but recovered to tie the scores at 3–3. Selt won the 76-minute deciding frame on the colours after Selby missed the brown, the first time he had beaten the four-time World Champion in a ranking event. "It's a fantastic result for me and a big scalp," Selt said afterwards. Anthony McGill trailed Pang 1–2 but made breaks of 53, 100, and 56 to win three consecutive frames for a 4‍–‍2 victory. Tom Ford beat Ding in a deciding frame, and Higgins defeated Ricky Walden, also in a decider. Kyren Wilson lost the first three frames against David Gilbert, but recovered to win four consecutive frames and advance to the last 16. Dominic Dale beat White 4‍–‍1, Zhang defeated Si Jiahui 4‍–‍2, and Wakelin whitewashed Craigie. Gary Wilson defeated O'Connor in a deciding frame.

=== Last 16 ===
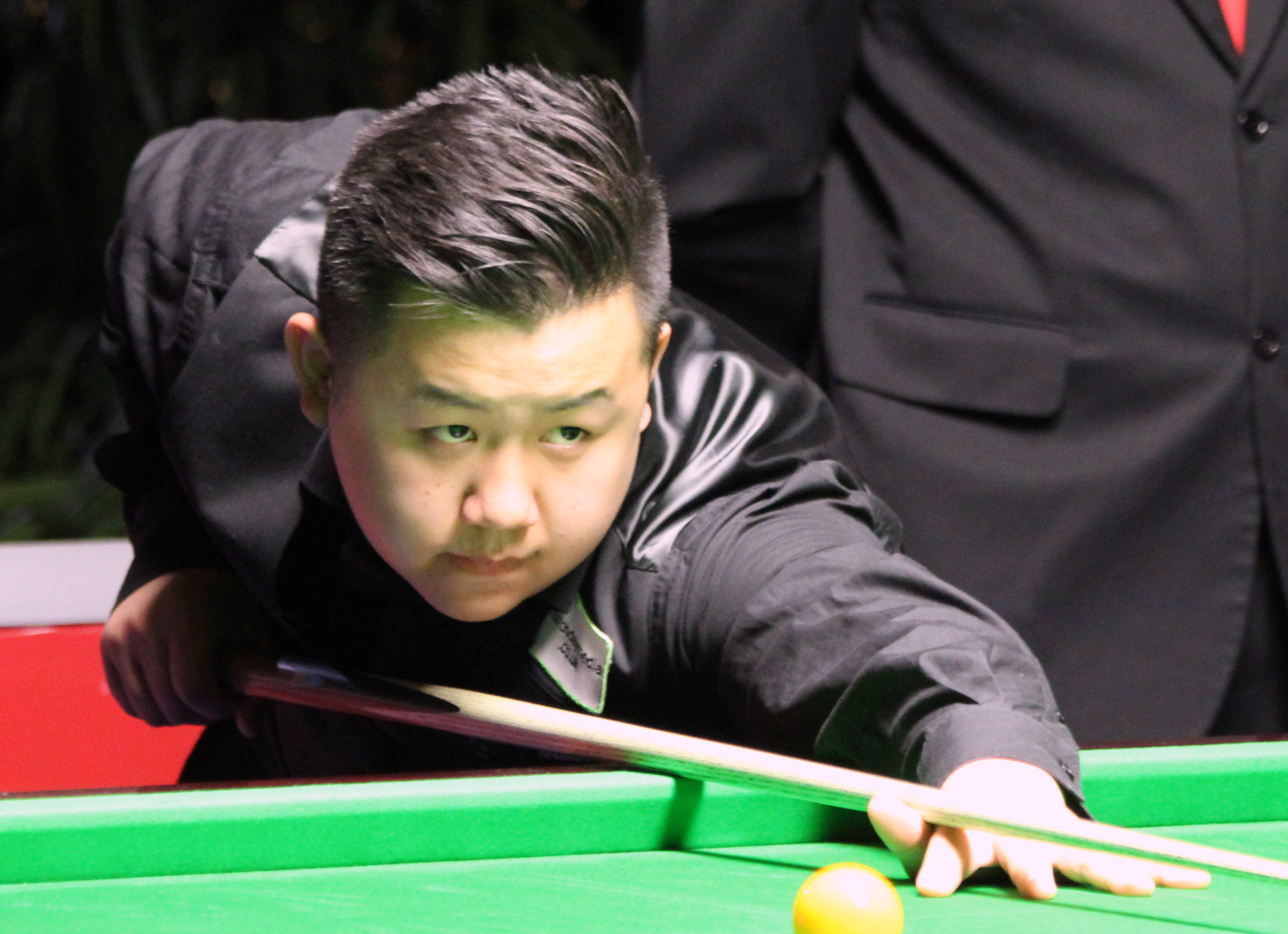
Sanderson Lam (pictured in 2016) defeated Anthony McGill 4‍–‍1 to reach his first ranking quarter-final.

The last-16 matches were played on 14 December. Sanderson Lam defeated McGill 4‍–‍1 to reach the first ranking quarter-final of his career. Higgins was tied at 2‍–‍2 with Lyu after the first four frames. In frame five, Higgins fluked the final red and cleared the colours to regain the lead. He also took the sixth frame aided by a break of 51 to win the match 4‍–‍2. "I'm delighted with winning tonight. I didn't play my best and neither did Lyu. It's not enjoyable when you aren't playing great, but I'm playing in front of a lot of the fans that are supporting the Scottish boys to try and do well," Higgins said. Ford won 4‍–‍2 over O'Donnell.

The match between Selt and Saengkham went to a decider, which Saengkham won. Bingham, who needed to reach the semi-finals of the tournament to earn a place at the 2024 World Grand Prix, produced breaks of 119, 68, 65, and 89 to whitewash Zhang. Gary Wilson defeated Thor 4‍–‍1, building breaks of 87, 88, 80, and 89, two of those while attempting maximum breaks. Zhou whitewashed Dale. Kyren Wilson led Wakelin 2‍–‍0, but Wakelin won four frames in a row to secure a 4‍–‍2 victory.

=== Quarter-finals ===
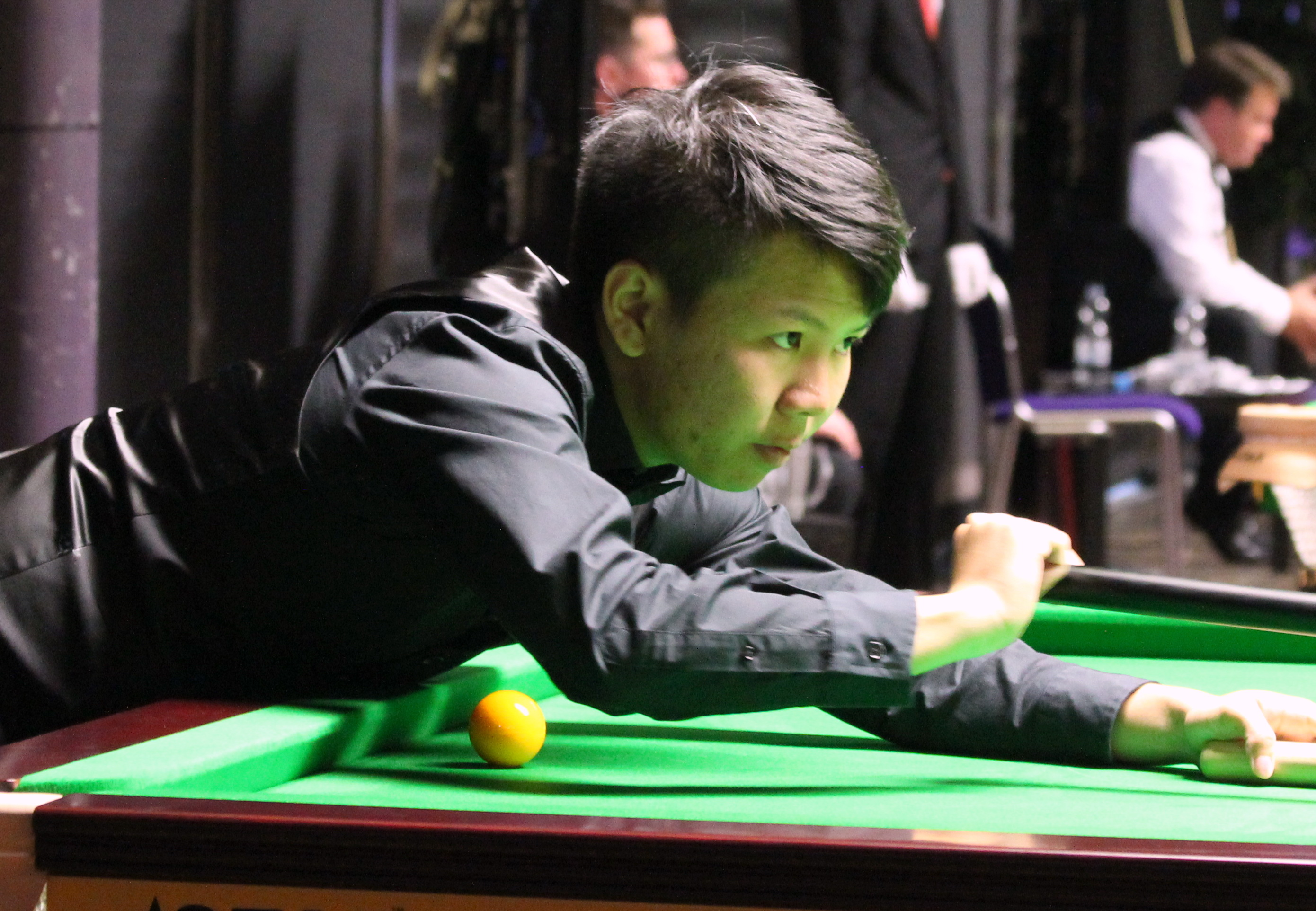
Zhou Yuelong (pictured in 2016) defeated Stuart Bingham 5‍–‍4 in a deciding frame.

The quarter-finals were played on 15 December as the best of nine frames. In the afternoon session, Zhou made a century break of 100 in the first frame and went on to lead Bingham 4‍–‍1. Bingham won three frames in a row, including a century break of 142 in the sixth, to level at 4‍–‍4, but Zhou won the deciding frame with a 70 break. Gary Wilson made breaks of 68, 96, 118, 68, and 82 to whitewash Wakelin. After the match, Wilson said: "It was nice to play pretty good for a change. It was a long time coming. I had a bad start to the season and it was just nice to find something and play how I know I can."

Saengkham was level at 2‍–‍2 with Lam at the mid-session interval, but took three of the next four frames to win 5‍–‍3. Higgins made a century break of 132 in the first frame against Ford, and went on to lead 3‍–‍0. Ford made breaks of 58, 56, and 99 to level at 3‍–‍3, but Higgins won the next two frames for a 5‍–‍3 victory. After the match, Higgins said: "It was a big win for me. I've lost a few times to Tom [Ford] and he is such an improved player. His head doesn't really go the way it used to in previous years. He is a top player. I know I'm going to have to play well tomorrow night now."

=== Semi-finals ===
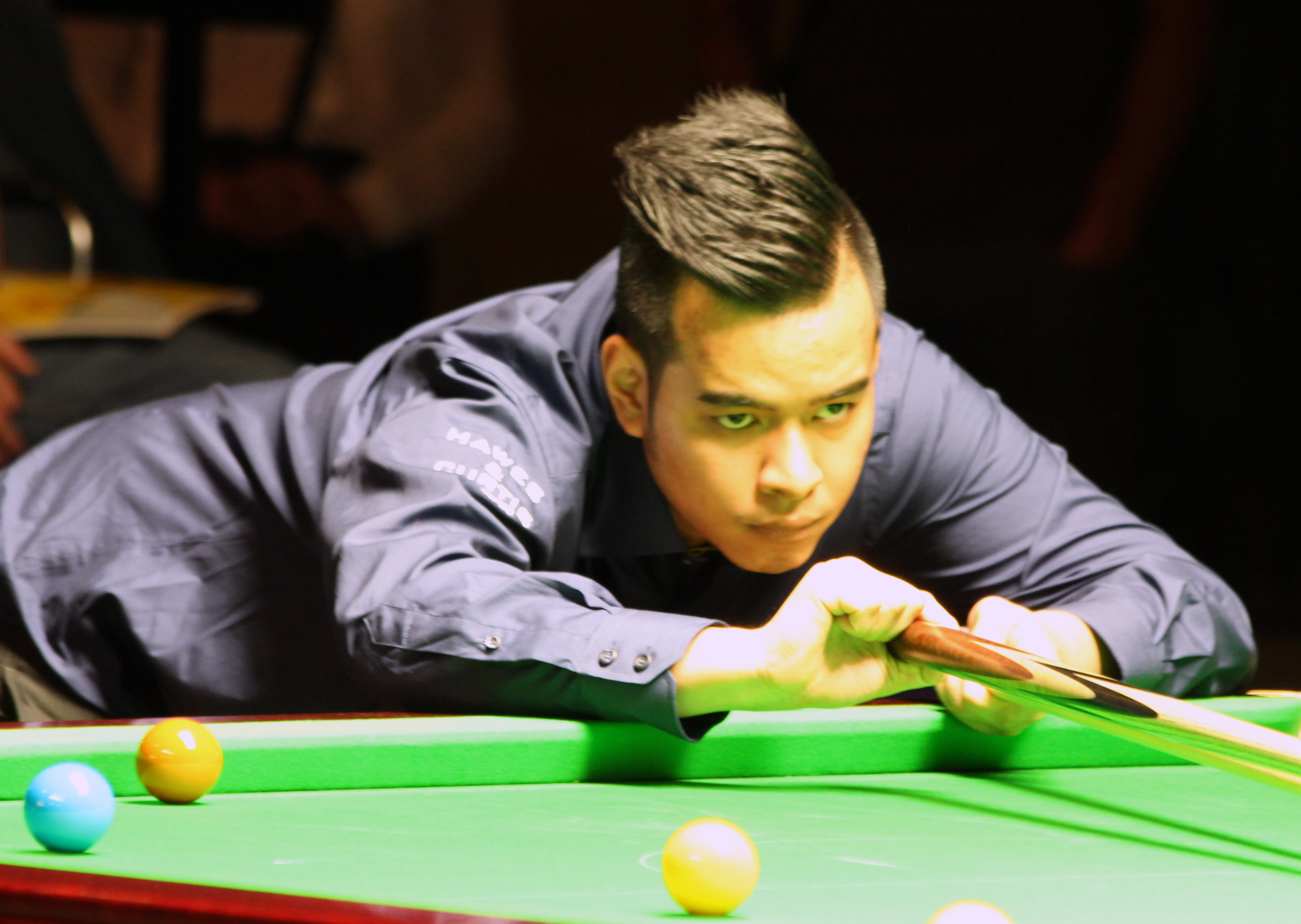
Noppon Saengkham (pictured in 2015) defeated John Higgins 6‍–‍3 to reach his first ranking final.

The semi-finals were played on 16 December as the best of eleven frames. In the first semi-final, Zhou took a 5‍–‍3 lead, but Wilson made breaks of 122 and 54 to tie the scores at 5‍–‍5. Zhou made a break of 69 in the deciding frame and celebrated after potting the green ball to lead by 31 points with just 22 remaining. However, Wilson obtained foul points from three snookers, and then won the frame on a re-spotted black. Afterwards, Wilson said: "I'm shocked. Absolutely shocked. I'm shaking like a leaf here. It was just one of those crazy games. It wasn't a great game. I was really struggling technically. I just fought and fought."

In the second semi-final, Higgins made breaks of 130 and 90 to lead Saengkham 3‍–‍1, but Saengkham took five frames in a row with breaks of 133, 120, and 83 to win 6‍–‍3 and reach his first ranking final. Saengkham said: "When I was 3‍–‍1 down I just had a 15-minute break. I felt nervous and went back to talk with my wife and [daughter] little Believe. I knew it could either happen again and I could lose in another semi-final or I could win today. I just tried to stay in the game and control something. I did it today."

=== Final ===
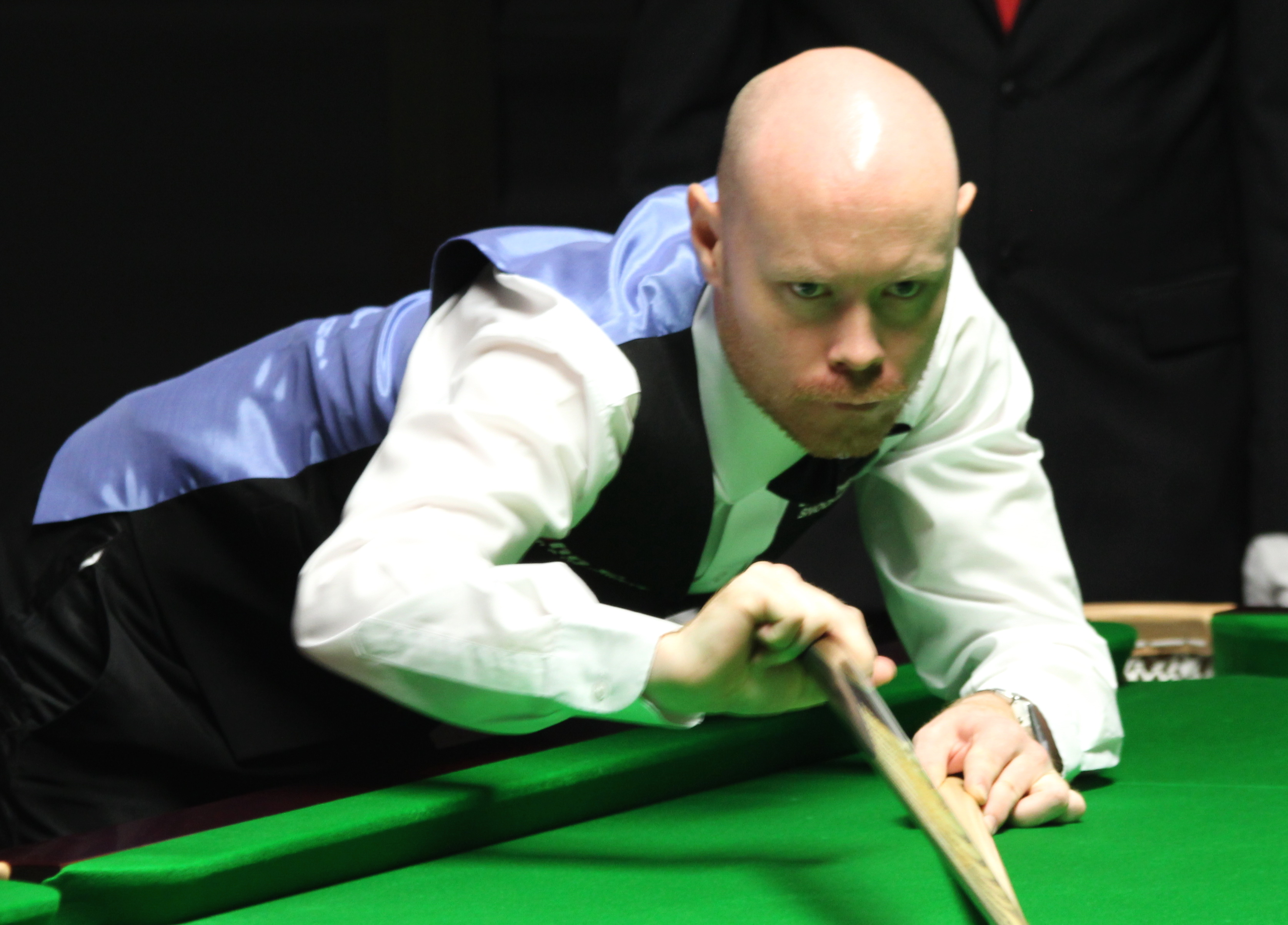
Gary Wilson (pictured in 2016) beat Noppon Saengkham 9‍–‍5 to successfully defend his title.

The best-of-17-frame final was played over two sessions on 17 December between the defending champion Gary Wilson and first-time ranking finalist Saengkham. Wilson made breaks of 90, 62, and 66 for a 3‍–‍1 lead, which he extended to 7‍–‍2 with breaks of 79, 105, 78, and 81. Saengkham won the next two frames with breaks of 132 and 97, narrowing Wilson's lead to 7‍–‍4. Wilson took frame 12 to move within one frame of victory. Saengkham won the 13th frame, but Wilson won the 14th with a 53 break to win the match 9‍–‍5, successfully defending the title and claiming his second ranking event victory.

After the match, Wilson said: "This game is crazy. I was absolutely nowhere for quite a while and didn't expect anything this week. Slowly but surely I found a little bit and a little bit more, to the point where I am actually quite proud of myself for the final. I've wanted to play in a final again and play in a solid way like I used to play when I was younger. I felt like I played that way." Saengkham said: "I have to give all of the credit to Gary [Wilson]. In the first session he was very strong. He scored very heavily and he controlled everything with the safety game. I had so much pressure because he didn't miss and was very good."

== Main draw ==
The draw for the tournament is shown below. Numbers in parentheses after the players' names denote the top 32 seeded players, and players in bold denote match winners. All matches were played as the best of seven frames until the quarter-finals, which were the best of nine. The semi-finals were the best of eleven, and the final was a best-of-seventeen-frame match played over two sessions.

=== Top half ===
**Last 64**; Best of 7 frames
**Gary Wilson (ENG) (1)**	**4**
Xing Zihao (CHN)	3
**Joe O'Connor (ENG) (32)**	**4**
Scott Donaldson (SCO)	1
Daniel Wells (WAL)	3
**Rory Thor (MAS)**	**4**
Ryan Day (WAL) (17)	3
**Ashley Carty (ENG)**	**4**
Thepchaiya Un-Nooh (THA)	2
**Chris Wakelin (ENG) (24)**	**4**
Yuan Sijun (CHN)	0
**Sam Craigie (ENG)**	**4**
Robbie Williams (ENG)	3
**David Gilbert (ENG) (25)**	**4**
Jordan Brown (NIR)	0
**Kyren Wilson (ENG) (8)**	**4**
Jamie Jones (WAL)	3
**Dominic Dale (WAL)**	**4**
Jimmy Robertson (ENG) (28)	3
**Jimmy White (ENG)**	**4**
Mark Davis (ENG)	1
**Andrew Higginson (ENG)**	**4**
**Zhou Yuelong (CHN) (21)**	**w/o**
Martin Gould (ENG)	w/d
Manasawin Phetmalaikul (THA)	0
**Stuart Bingham (ENG) (20)**	**4**
**Aaron Hill (IRL)**	**4**
Jack Lisowski (ENG) (13)	1
Julien Leclercq (BEL)	2
**Si Jiahui (CHN) (29)**	**4**
**Zhang Anda (CHN)**	**4**
Judd Trump (ENG) (4)	2

**Last 32**; Best of 7 frames
**(England) Gary Wilson (1)**	**4**
(England) Joe O'Connor (32)	3
**(Malaysia) Rory Thor**	**4**
(England) Ashley Carty	3
**(England) Chris Wakelin (24)**	**4**
(England) Sam Craigie	0
(England) David Gilbert (25)	3
**(England) Kyren Wilson (8)**	**4**
**(Wales) Dominic Dale**	**4**
(England) Jimmy White	1
(England) Andrew Higginson	2
**(China) Zhou Yuelong (21)**	**4**
**(England) Stuart Bingham (20)**	**4**
(Republic of Ireland) Aaron Hill	2
(China) Si Jiahui (29)	2
**(China) Zhang Anda**	**4**

**Last 16**; Best of 7 frames
**(England) Gary Wilson (1)**	**4**
(Malaysia) Rory Thor	1
**(England) Chris Wakelin (24)**	**4**
(England) Kyren Wilson (8)	2
(Wales) Dominic Dale	0
**(China) Zhou Yuelong (21)**	**4**
**(England) Stuart Bingham (20)**	**4**
(China) Zhang Anda	0

**Quarter-finals**; Best of 9 frames
**(England) Gary Wilson (1)**	**5**
(England) Chris Wakelin (24)	0
**(China) Zhou Yuelong (21)**	**5**
(England) Stuart Bingham (20)	4

**Semi-finals**; Best of 11 frames
**(England) Gary Wilson (1)**	**6**
(China) Zhou Yuelong (21)	5

Note: w/d=withdrawn; w/o=walkover

=== Bottom half ===
**Last 64**; Best of 7 frames
**Liam Graham (SCO)**	**4**
Ben Mertens (BEL)	2
**Sanderson Lam (ENG)**	**4**
Cao Yupeng (CHN)	1
**Pang Junxu (CHN)**	**4**
Xu Si (CHN)	1
**Anthony McGill (SCO) (19)**	**4**
Oliver Lines (ENG)	2
Lukas Kleckers (GER)	1
**Noppon Saengkham (THA) (22)**	**4**
Ishpreet Singh Chadha (IND)	3
**Ali Carter (ENG) (11)**	**4**
Alfie Burden (ENG)	1
**Matthew Selt (ENG) (27)**	**4**
Matthew Stevens (WAL)	3
**Mark Selby (ENG) (6)**	**4**
**Liu Hongyu (CHN)**	**4**
Zak Surety (ENG)	0
**Lyu Haotian (CHN)**	**4**
Jackson Page (WAL)	0
**John Higgins (SCO) (10)**	**4**
He Guoqiang (CHN)	1
**Ricky Walden (ENG) (23)**	**4**
Alexander Ursenbacher (SUI)	3
Liam Highfield (ENG)	2
**Tom Ford (ENG)**	**4**
Jenson Kendrick (ENG)	1
**Ding Junhui (CHN) (15)**	**4**
**Martin O'Donnell (ENG)**	**4**
Jamie Clarke (WAL)	2
James Cahill (ENG)	3
**Luca Brecel (BEL) (2)**	**4**

**Last 32**; Best of 7 frames
(Scotland) Liam Graham	3
**(England) Sanderson Lam**	**4**
(China) Pang Junxu	2
**(Scotland) Anthony McGill (19)**	**4**
**(Thailand) Noppon Saengkham (22)**	**4**
(England) Ali Carter (11)	2
**(England) Matthew Selt (27)**	**4**
(England) Mark Selby (6)	3
(China) Liu Hongyu	2
**(China) Lyu Haotian**	**4**
**(Scotland) John Higgins (10)**	**4**
(England) Ricky Walden (23)	3
**(England) Tom Ford (18)**	**4**
(China) Ding Junhui (15)	3
**(England) Martin O'Donnell**	**4**
(Belgium) Luca Brecel (2)	2

**Last 16**; Best of 7 frames
**(England) Sanderson Lam**	**4**
(Scotland) Anthony McGill (19)	1
**(Thailand) Noppon Saengkham (22)**	**4**
(England) Matthew Selt (27)	3
(China) Lyu Haotian	2
**(Scotland) John Higgins (10)**	**4**
**(England) Tom Ford (18)**	**4**
(England) Martin O'Donnell	2

**Quarter-finals**; Best of 9 frames
(England) Sanderson Lam	3
**(Thailand) Noppon Saengkham (22)**	**5**
**(Scotland) John Higgins (10)**	**5**
(England) Tom Ford (18)	3

**Semi-finals**; Best of 11 frames
**(Thailand) Noppon Saengkham (22)**	**6**
(Scotland) John Higgins (10)	3

=== Final ===
Final: Best of 17 frames. Referee: Marcel Eckardt; Meadowbank Sports Centre, Edinburgh, Scotland, 17 December 2023
**Gary Wilson** (1); England	**9**–5	Noppon Saengkham (22); Thailand
Afternoon: **90**–1, **75**–0, **120**–0, 7–**69**, **79**–5, **105**–5 (105), **82**–0, 61–**73**; Evening: **81**–0, 0–**132** (132), 0–**97**, **110**–15, 55–**78**, **84**–13
(frame 6) 105	Highest break	**132** (frame 10)
1	Century breaks	1

== Qualifying ==
Qualification for the tournament took place from 30 October to 2 November at the Morningside Arena in Leicester, although matches involving the top 16 players in the world rankings and two Scottish wildcards (Jack Borwick and Amaan Iqbal) were held over to be played at the final venue. Numbers in parentheses after the players' names denote the top 32 seeded players, and players in bold denote match winners.

=== Edinburgh ===
The results of the held-over matches played in Edinburgh on 11 December were as follows:

- **Gary Wilson** (ENG) (1) **4**–3 Elliot Slessor (ENG)
- **Jimmy Robertson** (ENG) (28) **4**–2 Amaan Iqbal (SCO)
- **Mark Selby** (ENG) (6) **4**–2 Sean O'Sullivan (ENG)
- **Ding Junhui** (CHN) (15) **4**–0 David Grace (ENG)
- Ronnie O'Sullivan (ENG) (3) w/d–**w/o** **Liam Graham** (SCO)
- Mark Williams (WAL) (9) 3–**4** **Sam Craigie** (ENG)
- Barry Hawkins (ENG) (14) 3–**4** **Pang Junxu** (CHN)
- **Ali Carter** (ENG) (11) **4**–3 Long Zehuang (CHN)
- Hossein Vafaei (IRN) (16) 3–**4** **Daniel Wells** (WAL)
- Jack Borwick (SCO) 1–**4** **Ishpreet Singh Chadha** (IND)
- Shaun Murphy (ENG) (7) 1–**4** **Liu Hongyu** (CHN)
- **Luca Brecel** (BEL) (2) **4**–0 Iulian Boiko (UKR)
- **Kyren Wilson** (ENG) (8) **4**–2 Mostafa Dorgham (EGY)
- Robert Milkins (ENG) (12) 0–**4** **Mark Davis** (ENG)
- **Judd Trump** (ENG) (4) **4**–0 Sydney Wilson (ENG)
- Mark Allen (NIR) (5) 2–**4** **Jamie Jones** (WAL)
- **Jack Lisowski** (ENG) (13) **4**–0 Mohamed Ibrahim (EGY)
- **John Higgins** (SCO) (10) **4**–0 Oliver Brown (ENG)

Note: w/d=withdrawn; w/o=walkover

=== Leicester ===
The results of the qualifying matches played in Leicester were as follows:

- Fan Zhengyi (CHN) (30) 3–**4** **Sanderson Lam** (ENG)
- **Cao Yupeng** (CHN) **4**–2 David Lilley (ENG)
- Xiao Guodong (CHN) (31) 2–**4** **Jamie Clarke** (WAL)
- **Zhou Yuelong** (CHN) (21) **4**–0 Anthony Hamilton (ENG)
- **Si Jiahui** (CHN) (29) **4**–3 Tian Pengfei (CHN)
- **Noppon Saengkham** (THA) (22) **4**–0 Rebecca Kenna (ENG)
- **Oliver Lines** (ENG) **4**–0 John Astley (ENG)
- Ian Burns (ENG) 1–**4** **Alfie Burden** (ENG)
- **Ashley Carty** (ENG) **4**–2 Andres Petrov (EST)
- **Anthony McGill** (SCO) (19) **4**–0 Ryan Thomerson (AUS)
- **Matthew Selt** (ENG) (27) **4**–1 Dylan Emery (WAL)
- Ma Hailong (CHN) 2–**4** **Thepchaiya Un-Nooh** (THA)
- Ben Woollaston (ENG) 2–**4** **M. Phetmalaikul** (THA)
- Mink Nutcharut (THA) 0–**4** **Xu Si** (CHN)
- **David Gilbert** (ENG) (25) **4**–3 Jak Jones (WAL)
- **Jimmy White** (ENG) **4**–3 Duane Jones (WAL) (Note: Duane Jones replaced Marco Fu, who withdrew.)
- Liam Pullen (ENG) 1–**4** **Zak Surety** (ENG)
- **Chris Wakelin** (ENG) (24) **4**–2 Mark Joyce (ENG)
- Ken Doherty (IRL) 1–**4** **Aaron Hill** (IRL)
- **Jackson Page** (WAL) **4**–1 Himanshu Jain (IND)
- **Martin O'Donnell** (ENG) **4**–2 Andrew Pagett (WAL)
- **Jordan Brown** (NIR) **4**–2 Adam Duffy (ENG)
- **Stuart Bingham** (ENG) (20) **4**–0 Michael White (WAL)
- Stuart Carrington (ENG) 1–**4** **Lukas Kleckers** (GER)
- **Ryan Day** (WAL) (17) **4**–2 Jiang Jun (CHN)
- Andy Hicks (ENG) 2–**4** **Zhang Anda** (CHN)
- Joe Perry (ENG) (26) 2–**4** **Lyu Haotian** (CHN)
- **Scott Donaldson** (SCO) **4**–3 Ashley Hugill (ENG)
- Ahmed Aly Elsayed (USA) 0–**4** **Ben Mertens** (BEL)
- **Ricky Walden** (ENG) (23) **4**–3 Hammad Miah (ENG)
- Rod Lawler (ENG) 1–**4** **Robbie Williams** (ENG)
- Ross Muir (SCO) 1–**4** **Dominic Dale** (WAL)
- **Matthew Stevens** (WAL) **4**–0 Victor Sarkis (BRA)
- **Joe O'Connor** (ENG) (32) **4**–0 Andy Lee (HKG)
- **Tom Ford** (ENG) (18) **4**–1 Louis Heathcote (ENG)
- Anton Kazakov (UKR) 2–**4** **Jenson Kendrick** (ENG)
- **Yuan Sijun** (CHN) **4**–0 Muhammad Asif (PAK)
- Peng Yisong (CHN) 0–**4** **He Guoqiang** (CHN)
- Wu Yize (CHN) 0–**4** **Alexander Ursenbacher** (SUI)
- **Rory Thor** (MAS) **4**–1 Graeme Dott (SCO)
- Baipat Siripaporn (THA) 0–**4** **Julien Leclercq** (BEL)
- **James Cahill** (ENG) **4**–3 Stan Moody (ENG)
- **Andrew Higginson** (ENG) **4**–3 Allan Taylor (ENG)
- **Liam Highfield** (ENG) **4**–0 Dean Young (SCO)
- Fergal O'Brien (IRL) 3–**4** **Xing Zihao** (CHN)
- Reanne Evans (ENG) 2–**4** **Martin Gould** (ENG)

== Century breaks ==
=== Main stage centuries ===
A total of 59 century breaks were made during the main stage of the tournament in Edinburgh.

- 145, 142, 135, 128, 119 – Stuart Bingham
- 143 – Jack Lisowski
- 142 – Judd Trump
- 141, 103 – Jamie Jones
- 140 – Cao Yupeng
- 138, 102 – Ali Carter
- 138, 106, 100 – Zhou Yuelong
- 135 – Martin O'Donnell
- 133, 132, 126, 120, 113, 101, 100 – Noppon Saengkham
- 133, 127 – Luca Brecel
- 132, 130 – John Higgins
- 130, 125, 122, 118, 105 – Gary Wilson
- 129, 126, 109, 106, 102 – Kyren Wilson
- 127, 100 – Barry Hawkins
- 126 – Sam Craigie
- 120 – Andrew Higginson
- 119 – Robbie Williams
- 118, 115, 103 – Ding Junhui
- 115, 105 – Thepchaiya Un-Nooh
- 115 – Mark Selby
- 115 – Si Jiahui
- 114 – Zhang Anda
- 113 – Rory Thor
- 112 – Ricky Walden
- 110 – Chris Wakelin
- 107 – Jimmy Robertson
- 105 – Tom Ford
- 104 – Elliot Slessor
- 102 – Aaron Hill
- 101 – Liam Highfield
- 100 – Anthony McGill

=== Qualifying stage centuries ===
A total of 19 century breaks were made during the qualifying stage of the tournament in Leicester.

- 139, 100 – Ben Mertens
- 138 – Xu Si
- 134, 129 – Zhou Yuelong
- 133, 120 – Yuan Sijun
- 130 – Jordan Brown
- 129 – Liam Highfield
- 125, 106 – Jak Jones
- 116 – Tom Ford
- 115 – David Gilbert
- 113 – Cao Yupeng
- 113 – Noppon Saengkham
- 106 – Ryan Day
- 105 – Zak Surety
- 102 – Tian Pengfei
- 100 – Jenson Kendrick
