= Manasawin Phetmalaikul =

Thai snooker player (born 1999)

Personal information
- Nickname: Quid
- Born: 19 May 1999 (age 27) Birmingham, England

Sport
- Country: Thailand
- Sport: Snooker
- Professional: 2023–2025
- Highest ranking: 93 (July 2024)
- Best ranking finish: Last 64 (2023 Scottish Open)

Manasawin Phetmalaikul (Thai: มนัสวินษ์ เพชรมาลัยกุล, born 19 May 1999) is a professional snooker player from Thailand. In 2023 he earned a two-year place on the World Snooker Tour.

== Early and personal life ==
Born in Birmingham, England to Thai parents, his father Chusak and his mother, Sirilak. His father is from Phetchaburi province and his mother is from Bangkok. Both graduated from Assumption University and his mother went to study for a master's degree in Birmingham. He is the eldest of three siblings, having a younger brother and sister. Also, his best friend is sabil. He attended school at Queen Elizabeth Sixth Form College in Darlington. His father owned The Royal Thai restaurant, in Parkgate Darlington. As a child in England, nicknamed ‘Quid’, he got to play snooker against snooker multi-world champion Steve Davis at a snooker exhibition, and has also practised with world champion Stuart Bingham.

== Career ==
When based in Darlington he would practise at the Q House Snooker Academy with the likes of Hossein Vafaei, Thepchaiya Un-Nooh, Mike Dunn, Sunny Akani, as well as Chinese professionals. However, he made the decision to relocate to Bangkok aged 23 years-old.

In June 2023 he reached the semi finals of the Asia/Oceania Q-school event held in Bangkok where he faced Hong Kong's Cheung Ka Wai. After winning he secured a two-year place on to the World Snooker Tour starting with the 2023–24 snooker season.

He secured his first win as a professional by beating Ben Woollaston at the 2023 Scottish Open on 31 October 2023. In January 2024, he pushed Mark Allen to a deciding frame, losing 5–4 at the 2024 German Masters.

== Performance and rankings timeline ==
Tournament	2015/ 16	2016/ 17	2017/ 18	2023/ 24	2024/ 25
Ranking (Note: It shows the ranking at the beginning of the season)	(Note: He was an amateur)			(Note: New players on the Main Tour don't have a ranking)	93
Ranking tournaments
Championship League	Non-Ranking Event			A	RR
Xi'an Grand Prix	Tournament Not Held				LQ
Saudi Arabia Masters	Tournament Not Held				1R
English Open	NH	A	A	LQ	LQ
British Open	Not Held			LQ	LQ
Wuhan Open	Not Held			LQ	LQ
Northern Ireland Open	NH	A	A	LQ	LQ
International Championship	A	A	A	LQ	LQ
UK Championship	A	A	A	LQ	LQ
Shoot Out	NR	A	A	1R	1R
Scottish Open	NH	A	A	1R	LQ
German Masters	A	A	A	LQ	LQ
Welsh Open	A	A	A	LQ	LQ
World Open	A	A	A	LQ	1R
World Grand Prix	DNQ	DNQ	DNQ	DNQ	DNQ
Players Championship (Note: The event was called the Players Tour Championship Grand Final (2015/2016))	DNQ	DNQ	DNQ	DNQ	DNQ
Tour Championship	Not Held			DNQ	DNQ
World Championship	A	A	A	LQ	LQ
Former ranking tournaments
Paul Hunter Classic	MR	LQ	LQ	Not Held	
Gibraltar Open	MR	LQ	LQ	Not Held	
European Masters	NH	A	A	LQ	NH

Performance Table Legend
LQ	lost in the qualifying draw	#R	lost in the early rounds of the tournament (WR = Wildcard round, RR = Round robin)	QF	lost in the quarter-finals
SF	lost in the semi-finals	F	lost in the final	W	won the tournament
DNQ	did not qualify for the tournament	A	did not participate in the tournament	WD	withdrew from the tournament

NH / Not Held	means an event was not held.
NR / Non-Ranking Event	means an event is/was no longer a ranking event.
R / Ranking Event	means an event is/was a ranking event.
MR / Minor-Ranking Event	means an event is/was a minor-ranking event.

=== Amateur finals: 1 ===
Outcome	No.	Year	Championship	Opponent in the final	Score
Runner-up	1.	2022	English 6-Red Championship	(England) Sean O'Sullivan	2–8
