= 2015 WPA World Nine-ball Junior Championship =

World Junior pool championship, held November 2016

2017 WPA World Nine-ball Juniors Championship
Tournament information
- Dates: 14 November–17 November 2015
- Venue: Huimin Middle School
- City: Shanghai
- Country: China
- Organisation: WPA
- Format: double elimination, single elimination

Final
- Champion: Daniel Macioł (U17); Long Zehuang (boys); Chezka Centeno (girls)

The 2015 WPA World Nine-ball Junior Championship was a nine-ball pool championship. It was the 2015 edition of the WPA World Nine-ball Junior Championship. It had three categories, one for under-17s, under-19 and a women's under-19 tournament.

== Medal winners ==
Disziplin	Gold	Silber	Bronze
Under-17s	Daniel Macioł (POL)	Zheng Xiaohuai (CHN)	Kong Dejing (CHN)
Under-17s	Daniel Macioł (POL)	Zheng Xiaohuai (CHN)	Kamil Sząszor (POL)
Under-19s	Long Zehuang (CHN)	Maksim Dudanets (RUS)	Chen Lo Hao (HKG)
Under-19s	Long Zehuang (CHN)	Maksim Dudanets (RUS)	Krystian Cwikla (POL)
Women's	Chezka Centeno (PHL)	Xia Yuying (CHN)	Xue Dou (CHN)
Women's	Chezka Centeno (PHL)	Xia Yuying (CHN)	Jiang Teng (CHN)

== Under-17s event ==
Below is the knockout stage from the quarter-finals onwards:

Quarterfinals
Kong Dejing (CHN)	8
Robbie Capito (HKG)	1
Daniel Macioł (POL)	8
Sanjin Pehlivanović (BIH)	4
Kamil Sząszor (POL)	8
Enkbold Temuujin (MNG)	0
Le Mi (CHN)	6
Zheng Xiaohuai (CHN)	8

Semifinals
Kong Dejing (CHN)	2
Daniel Macioł (POL)	8
Kamil Sząszor (POL)	7
Zheng Xiaohuai (CHN)	8

Finals
Daniel Macioł (POL)	8
Zheng Xiaohuai (CHN)	4

== Under-19s event ==
Below is the knockout stage from the quarter-finals onwards:

Quarterfinals
Pascal Bruckmann (DEU)	6
Maksim Dudanets (RUS)	11
Chen Lo Hao (HKG)	11
Ding W. (CHN)	8
Krystian Cwikla (POL)	9
A. al-Blooshui (ARE)	0
Long Zehuang (CHN)	11
Tang Ching-ting (TPE)	8

Semifinals
Maksim Dudanets (RUS)	11
Chen Lo Hao (HKG)	7
Krystian Cwikla (POL)	5
Long Zehuang (CHN)	11

Finals
Maksim Dudanets (RUS)	5
Long Zehuang (CHN)	11

== Ladies event ==
Below is the knockout stage from the quarter-finals onwards:

Quarterfinals
Wu Yumei (CHN)	4
Xia Yuying (CHN)	9
Liu Xiazhi (CHN)	5
Xue Dou (CHN)	9
Wang Xiaotong (CHN)	2
Chezka Centeno (PHL)	9
Kristina Tkach (RUS)	5
Jiang Teng (CHN)	9

Semifinals
Xia Yuying (CHN)	9
Xue Dou (CHN)	4
Chezka Centeno (PHL)	9
Jiang Teng (CHN)	0

Finals
Xia Yuying (CHN)	3
Chezka Centeno (PHL)	9
