= 2025 Northern Ireland Open =

Snooker tournament

2025 BetVictor Northern Ireland Open
- Part of the Home Nations Series

Tournament information
- Dates: 19–26 October 2025
- Venue: Waterfront Hall
- City: Belfast
- Country: Northern Ireland
- Organisation: World Snooker Tour
- Format: Ranking event
- Total prize fund: £550,400
- Winner's share: £100,000
- Highest break: Liam Pullen (ENG) (143)

Final
- Champion: Jack Lisowski (ENG)
- Runner-up: Judd Trump (ENG)
- Score: 9–8

The 2025 Northern Ireland Open (officially the 2025 BetVictor Northern Ireland Open) was a professional snooker tournament that took place from 19 to 26 October 2025 at the Waterfront Hall in Belfast, Northern Ireland. Qualifiers took place from 4 to 7 September at the Leicester Arena in Leicester, England. The 10th consecutive edition of the tournament since it was first staged in 2016, it was the seventh ranking event of the 2025–26 snooker season, following the 2025 Xi'an Grand Prix and preceding the 2025 International Championship. It was the second of four tournaments in the season's Home Nations Series, following the 2025 English Open and preceding the 2025 Scottish Open and the 2026 Welsh Open. The tournament was broadcast by TNT Sports in the United Kingdom and Ireland, by Eurosport in mainland Europe, by local channels in China and elsewhere in Asia, and by WST Play in all other territories. The winner received £100,000 from a total prize fund of £550,400.

Kyren Wilson was the defending champion, having defeated Judd Trump 9–3 in the 2024 final, but he lost 3–5 to Jack Lisowski in the quarter-finals. The final was contested between Lisowski and Trump, who reached the 50th ranking final of his career; it took place before 1,435 spectators, a record audience at a UK snooker event outside of the Masters. Lisowski defeated Trump 9–8 to win the first ranking title of his 15-year professional career, having previously lost six ranking finals. He dedicated the title to his parents, following the death of his father earlier that year. The event produced 64 century breaks, 26 during the qualifiers in Leicester and 38 during the main stage in Belfast, of which the highest was a 143 by Liam Pullen in his second qualifying round match against Long Zehuang.

== Overview ==
The Northern Ireland Open was first staged in 2016 at the Titanic Exhibition Centre in Belfast, Northern Ireland. The inaugural winner was Mark King, who defeated Barry Hawkins 9–8 in the final to win his maiden ranking title. The tournament winner receives the Alex Higgins Trophy, named in honour of the two-time World Champion, who died in 2010. At the inaugural edition of the tournament, the trophy was presented by Higgins's daughter Lauren.

The 2025 edition of the tournament—the 10th consecutive staging of the event—took place from 19 to 26 October at the Waterfront Hall in Belfast. Qualifying took place from 4 to 7 September at the Leicester Arena in Leicester, England. It was the seventh ranking event of the 2025–26 snooker season, following the 2025 Xi'an Grand Prix and preceding the 2025 International Championship. It was the second of four tournaments in the season's Home Nations Series, following the 2025 English Open and preceding the 2025 Scottish Open and the 2026 Welsh Open. Kyren Wilson was the defending champion, having defeated Judd Trump 9–3 in the 2024 final.

=== Format ===
The tournament used a tiered format first implemented for the Home Nations Series in the 2024–25 snooker season. In the first qualifying round, players seeded 65–96 faced those seeded 97 and under, including selected amateurs. In the second qualifying round, the 32 winners from the first qualifying round faced players seeded 33–64. At the last-64 stage, the 32 winners from the second qualifying round faced the top 32 seeds. All matches were played as the best of seven frames until the quarter‑finals, which were the best of nine. The semi‑finals were the best of 11, and the final was a best‑of‑17 frame match played over two sessions.

Mark Williams withdrew from the main stage of the tournament. Marco Fu also withdrew due to injury and Neil Robertson withdrew for health reasons. Their respective opponents, Long Zehuang, Tom Ford, and David Grace, received byes to the last 32.

=== Broadcasters ===
The qualifying rounds were broadcast in the United Kingdom, Germany, Italy, and Austria by Discovery+ and in other European territories by HBO Max. They were broadcast in mainland China by the CBSA‑WPBSA Academy WeChat Channel, the CBSA‑WPBSA Academy Douyin, Huya Live and Migu. In all other territories, they were broadcast by WST Play.

The main stage was broadcast in the United Kingdom and Ireland by TNT Sports, Discovery+, and DMAX. It was broadcast in mainland Europe by Eurosport, with streaming coverage on Discovery+ in Germany, Italy, and Austria and on HBO Max in other European territories. It was broadcast in mainland China by the same broadcasters as the qualifying rounds, in Hong Kong by Now TV, in Malaysia and Brunei by Astro SuperSport, in Thailand by True Sports, in Taiwan by Sportcast, and in the Philippines by TAP Sports. In territories where no other coverage was available, the tournament was streamed via WST Play.

=== Prize fund ===
The prize fund for the tournament is detailed below. In addition, the player who won the most cumulative prize money across the season's four Home Nations Series events received a bonus of £150,000.

- Winner: £100,000
- Runner-up: £45,000
- Semi-final: £21,000
- Quarter-final: £13,200
- Last 16: £9,000
- Last 32: £5,400
- Last 64: £3,600
- Last 96: £1,000
- Highest break: £5,000
- Total: £550,400

== Summary ==
=== First qualifying round (last 128) ===
Ken Doherty, the 1997 World Champion, failed to get past the first qualifying round, losing 1–4 to tour debutant Yao Pengcheng. Marco Fu began his match against Amir Sarkhosh with back-to-back century breaks of 104 and 114 and went on to secure a 4–2 victory. Farakh Ajaib won a deciding frame on the colours to defeat Oliver Brown, and Ian Burns made a century of 130 as he recorded a whitewash over Haydon Pinhey. Reanne Evans, a 12-time World Women's Champion, received a walkover after her opponent, Mohammed Shehab, withdrew from the event. Robbie McGuigan lost the first two frames against fellow Northern Irish player Fergal Quinn but then won three in a row to take the lead at 3–2. Quinn, playing in his first season on the professional tour, recovered to win the match in a deciding frame. Mateusz Baranowski came from 0–3 behind to beat Wang Yuchen in a decider, and Liam Pullen made breaks of 89, 96, and 100 as he whitewashed Ben Mertens.

=== Second qualifying round (last 96) ===
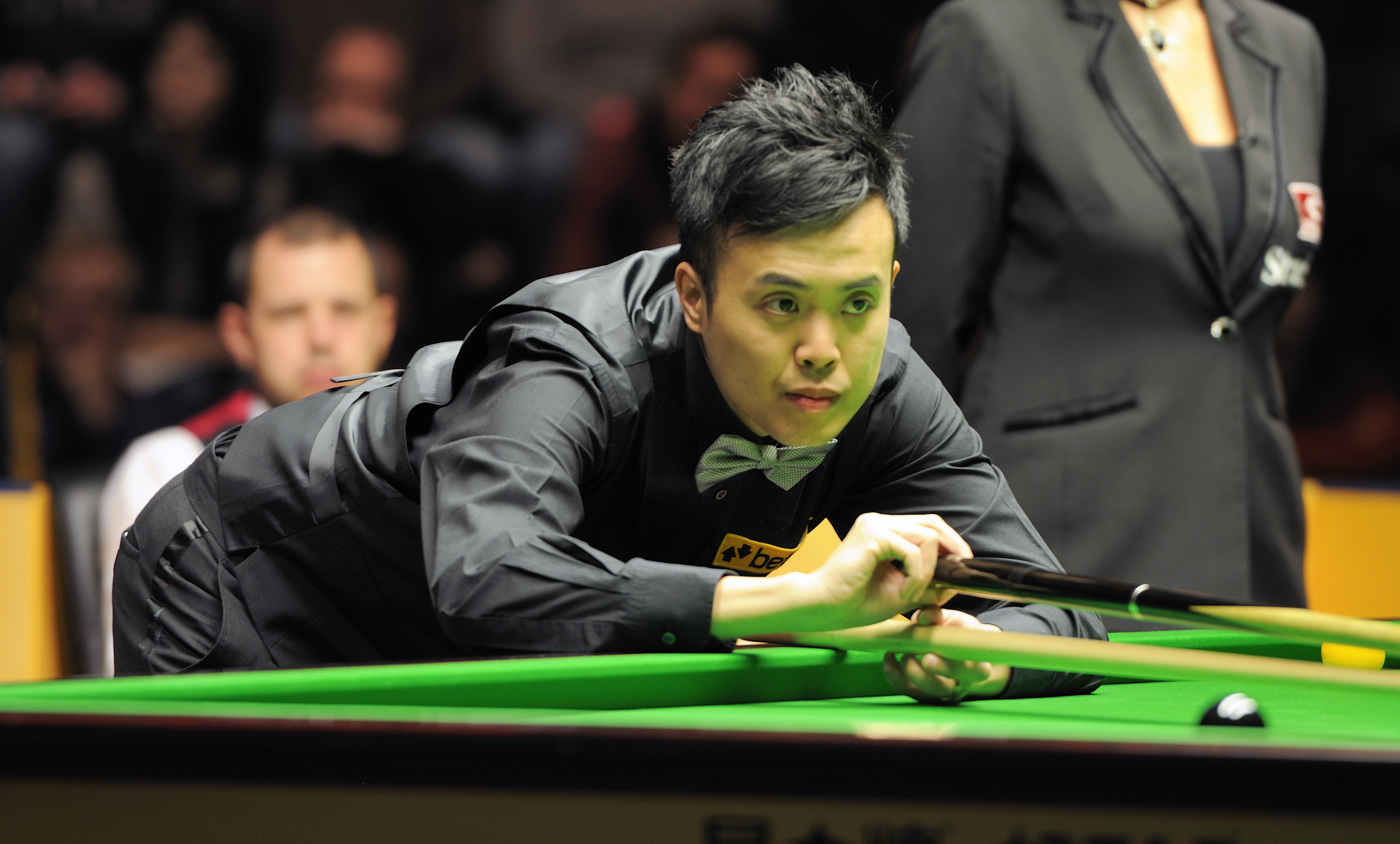
Marco Fu (pictured in 2013) won two qualifying matches in Leicester but withdrew from the main stage due to injury.

Thepchaiya Un-Nooh, who had recently reached the last 16 of the 2025 Wuhan Open, took a 3–1 lead over Julien Leclercq. Leclercq tied the scores at 3–3 and led by 59 points in the deciding frame, but Un-Nooh produced a 71 break and went on to win the match on the last pink. Dylan Emery defeated Xu Si in a deciding frame, while Stan Moody whitewashed Evans. Lan Yuhao, aged 17, made breaks of 115, 53, 80, and 50 as he defeated Michael Holt 4–2. Fu eliminated Jamie Jones in a deciding frame, but subsequently withdrew from the main stage after suffering a fractured elbow. Haris Tahir defeated Lyu Haotian, also in a decider.

Luca Brecel, the 2023 World Champion, won his first match of the season by whitewashing Liam Davies. Steven Hallworth trailed Matthew Stevens 2–3 but made a century of 136 to tie the scores and then a 64 break to win the decider. Anthony McGill advanced with a 4–1 victory over Alexander Ursenbacher, and Robert Milkins reached the final stages with a 4–2 win over amateur player Patrick Whelan. Pullen lost 2–4 to Long Zehuang but made a century of 143 in the match, the highest break of the tournament and his highest in professional competition. Competing as an amateur, Ashley Hugill made breaks of 132 and 67 in the last two frames to beat Ricky Walden 4–3. Zak Surety defeated Quinn in a deciding frame.

=== Round one (last 64) ===
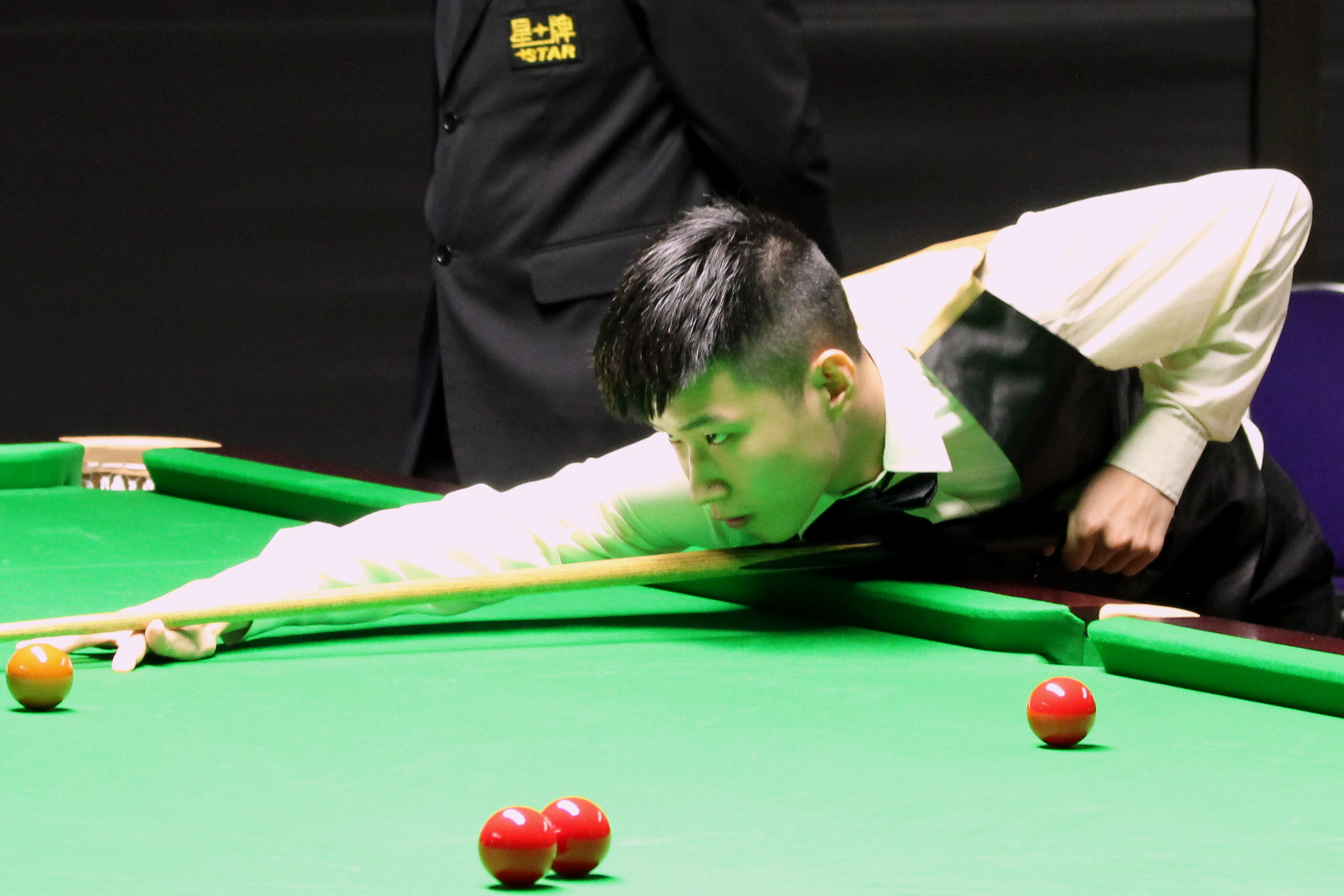
The reigning World Champion Zhao Xintong (pictured in 2016) lost 0–4 to the world number 55 Jordan Brown.

Local Antrim player Jordan Brown, the world number 55, whitewashed the reigning World Champion Zhao Xintong and reached the last 32 of a ranking event for the first time in 20 months. "It has been very difficult over the last couple of seasons," Brown said afterwards. "It's just confidence. I am a confidence player and when that goes, everything goes." Zhao, who scored only 52 points in the match, stated that he had felt unfocused and dizzy due to illness. Mark Selby made a century of 129 as he defeated Burns 4–1, and Chris Wakelin, runner-up at the 2023 edition, beat Lan by the same score. Hugill defeated Noppon Saengkham 4–2, and Wu Yize beat Scott Donaldson in a deciding frame. Four-time champion Judd Trump lost the first frame against McGill but then won three consecutive frames with breaks of 62, 68, and 67. McGill took frame five on the last black, but Trump won the sixth with a clearance of 82 for a 4–2 victory. "It's just a matter of time before I have a deep run," said the world number one Trump, who had not won a ranking title since the 2024 UK Championship. "You have to be patient." John Higgins made breaks of 84, 95, and 61 as he whitewashed Louis Heathcote. Jackson Page whitewashed Hallworth, and Jack Lisowski made a century of 112 as he whitewashed Tahir in 47 minutes. He Guoqiang advanced with a 4–2 win over David Gilbert.

Cork player Aaron Hill, who had recently reached the quarter-finals of the 2025 English Open, lost the first frame against Lei Peifan but then made breaks of 84, 109, 54, and 134 as he won four frames in a row for a 4–1 victory. "It has been a long time coming but I am getting consistent results now," said 23-year-old Hill. "Experience is massive in this game and I have five years behind me." Shaun Murphy, who had recently won the 2025 British Open and been runner-up at the 2025 Xi'an Grand Prix, made breaks of 73, 69, 115, and 67 as he whitewashed David Lilley. "Earlier in this season I had to keep the faith and I felt it would come good at some stage," said Murphy afterwards. "I'm just trying to enjoy this while it lasts." Elliot Slessor made an 87 break in the deciding frame to beat Fan Zhengyi, while Barry Hawkins whitewashed Surety. Zhou Yuelong, runner-up at the English Open, defeated Emery 4–2.

Two-time champion Mark Allen, recent winner of the English Open, trailed Milkins 1–2 but came from 51 points behind to take frame four with a 52 clearance. Milkins won frame five, but Allen made a century of 104 to tie the scores at 3–3. On a break of 14 in the decider, Milkins missed a red to a centre pocket, and Allen produced another century of 113 to secure victory. "It was nice to finish the match off well because I was getting a lot of support and they didn't have much to cheer about until the end," said Allen afterwards. Chang Bingyu lost the first three frames against Gary Wilson but recovered to tie the scores at 3–3. In the decider, Chang led by 17 points with four colours remaining but twice missed match ball, the last brown, and Wilson cleared to win. "From 3–0 it all went a bit silly," said Wilson. "Thankfully I held myself together to pot the last few balls because they weren't easy." Martin O'Donnell came from 1–3 behind against Jak Jones to win the three-and-a-half-hour match in a deciding frame. Un-Nooh lost the first two frames against Joe O'Connor but then won four in a row for a 4–2 victory. Jimmy Robertson defeated Stuart Bingham by the same score.

Facing Ali Carter, Moody won the first two frames, but Carter made back-to-back centuries of 137 and 100 to tie the scores at 2–2. Moody won the fifth frame with a 72 break but missed a red to a centre pocket in frame six that allowed Carter to level again at 3–3. After Carter made a 43 break in the decider, Moody made a break of 42 before missing a long pot on the blue, allowing Carter to secure victory. "It was experience which got me over the line," said Carter afterwards. The defending champion Kyren Wilson made a century of 133 as he took a 2–1 lead over Oliver Lines, but Lines won two consecutive frames to lead 3–2. Wilson tied the scores at 3–3 with a 61 break and was 42 points ahead in the decider when he missed a red. Lines had an opportunity to clear, but he missed the green while playing with the long rest, and Wilson secured victory. "It was a very difficult first-round match. [Lines] has been in good form this season," said Wilson afterwards. Stephen Maguire made breaks of 75 and 63 as he defeated Brecel 4–1. Mark Davis lost the first frame against Zhang Anda but then won four in a row, making a 118 century in frame four, to win 4–1. Si Jiahui whitewashed Cheung Ka Wai, and Ryan Day advanced with a 4–2 win over Matthew Selt.

=== Round two (last 32) ===
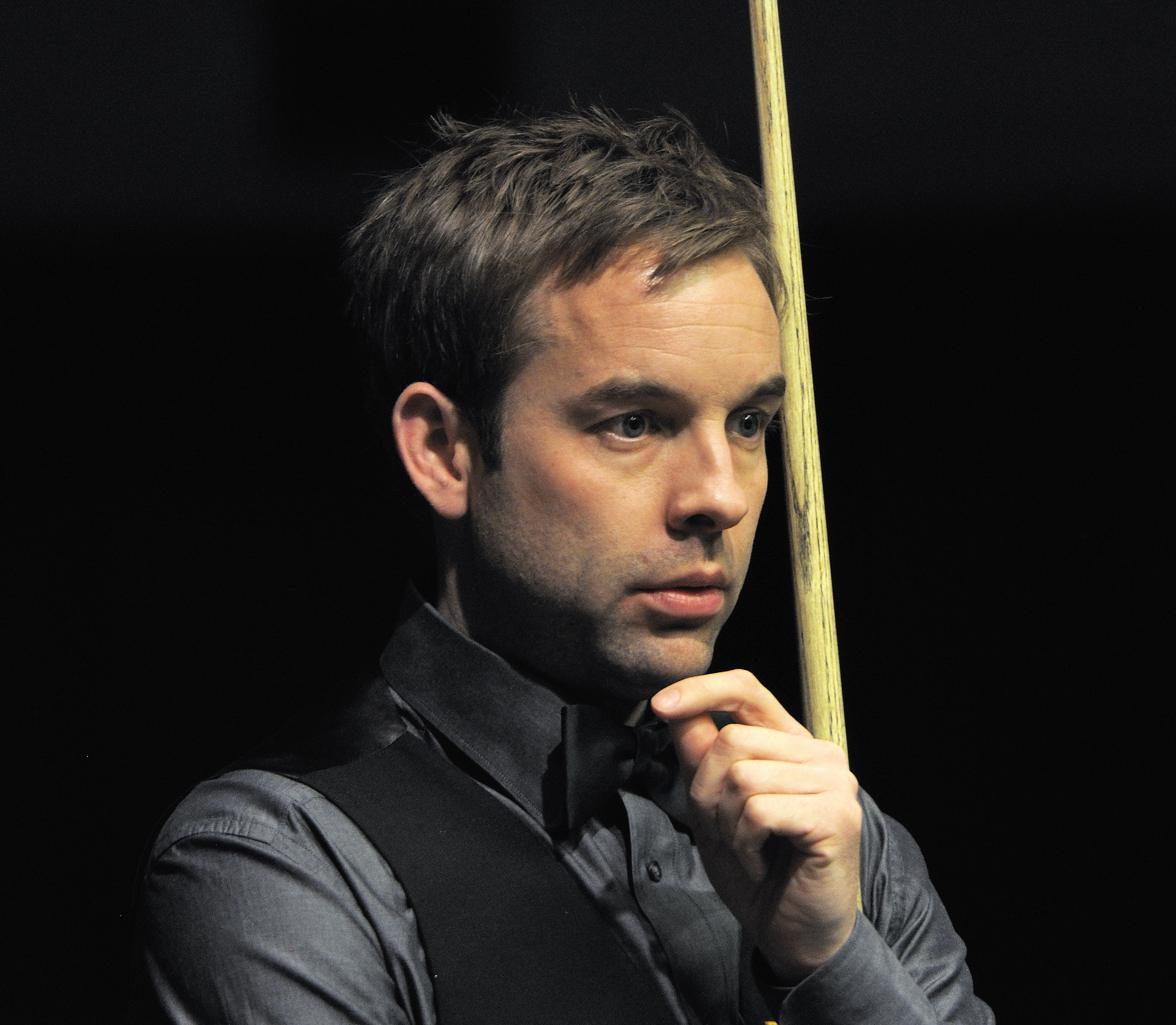
Ali Carter (pictured in 2013) won a deciding frame against Jimmy Robertson with a total clearance of 135, but then withdrew for personal reasons.

Tom Ford, who had withdrawn from the 2025 British Open due to a shoulder injury, stated that he was continuing to experience pain and discomfort while playing. However, he made breaks of 75 and 78 as he defeated Wakelin 4–1. Yuan Sijun beat Long 4–2, and Trump made one half-century break as he defeated Page by the same score. Hill won three consecutive frames with breaks of 66, 77, and 58 to lead Hawkins 3–1 at the mid-session interval. Hawkins tied the scores at 3–3, but Hill made a 92 break to win the deciding frame. Hill afterwards paid tribute to his opponent, calling Hawkins "one of the greats and such a tough player to beat." Higgins lost the first two frames against Pang Junxu but then won three in a row, making a century of 126 in frame three, as he moved 3–2 ahead. Pang tied the scores at 3–3 with a century of 137, but Higgins clinched the decider with a 45 break.

Facing Selby, Lisowski lost the opening frame on the last black but then made breaks of 61, 103, and 51 to lead 3–1. Selby made a 65 break to win the fifth, but Lisowski secured a 4–2 victory with a 65 break in frame six. Commenting on the death of his father in March, Lisowski said afterwards: "I didn't have a lot of fight in me for the first few months. When I played a month after my dad died, in every frame I felt so emotional. I wish I had taken longer off, but I kept going." Selby, who had previously won the other three Home Nations Series tournaments but never the Northern Ireland Open, called his performance "pathetic" and "not good enough". Slessor won the first frame against Murphy and was on a break of 55 in the second when he missed a red to a corner pocket. Murphy won the frame with a 68 clearance and then made breaks of 81 and 82 as he took a 3–1 lead. He went on to win the match 4–2. "It was a tough game," Murphy said afterwards. "[Slessor] is a player I have a lot of respect for and I think it's only a matter of time before wins come his way." He Guoqiang produced breaks of 67, 64, 77, and 120 as he defeated Wu 4–2, while Gary Wilson beat O'Donnell by the same score. Si made three half-century breaks as he whitewashed Maguire, and Un-Nooh advanced with a 4–1 win over Davis.

Allen trailed Ben Woollaston 1–2 but then made back-to-back centuries of 135 and 100 to build a 3–2 lead. Woollaston tied the scores at 3–3, but Allen won the decider, helped by a break of 57. "I don't do things the easy way," said Allen afterwards. "I would love to see what it's like to win 4–0! But I always feel comfortable in deciders and fancy my chances." Brown made breaks of 73 and 94 as he whitewashed Hugill. "To walk into the arena alongside Mark Allen was very special," Brown said of playing alongside a fellow Northern Irish player. "Before we went out, we said to each other 'It's not going to be quiet tonight!' These are memories that I won't forget." The world number two and defending champion Kyren Wilson made breaks of 135 and 93 in his 4–1 victory over Day. Zhou made three half-century breaks as he beat David Grace 4–2. Jimmy Robertson lost the first three frames against Carter but recovered to tie the scores at 3–3. However, Carter produced a total clearance of 135 to win the deciding frame.

=== Round three (last 16) ===
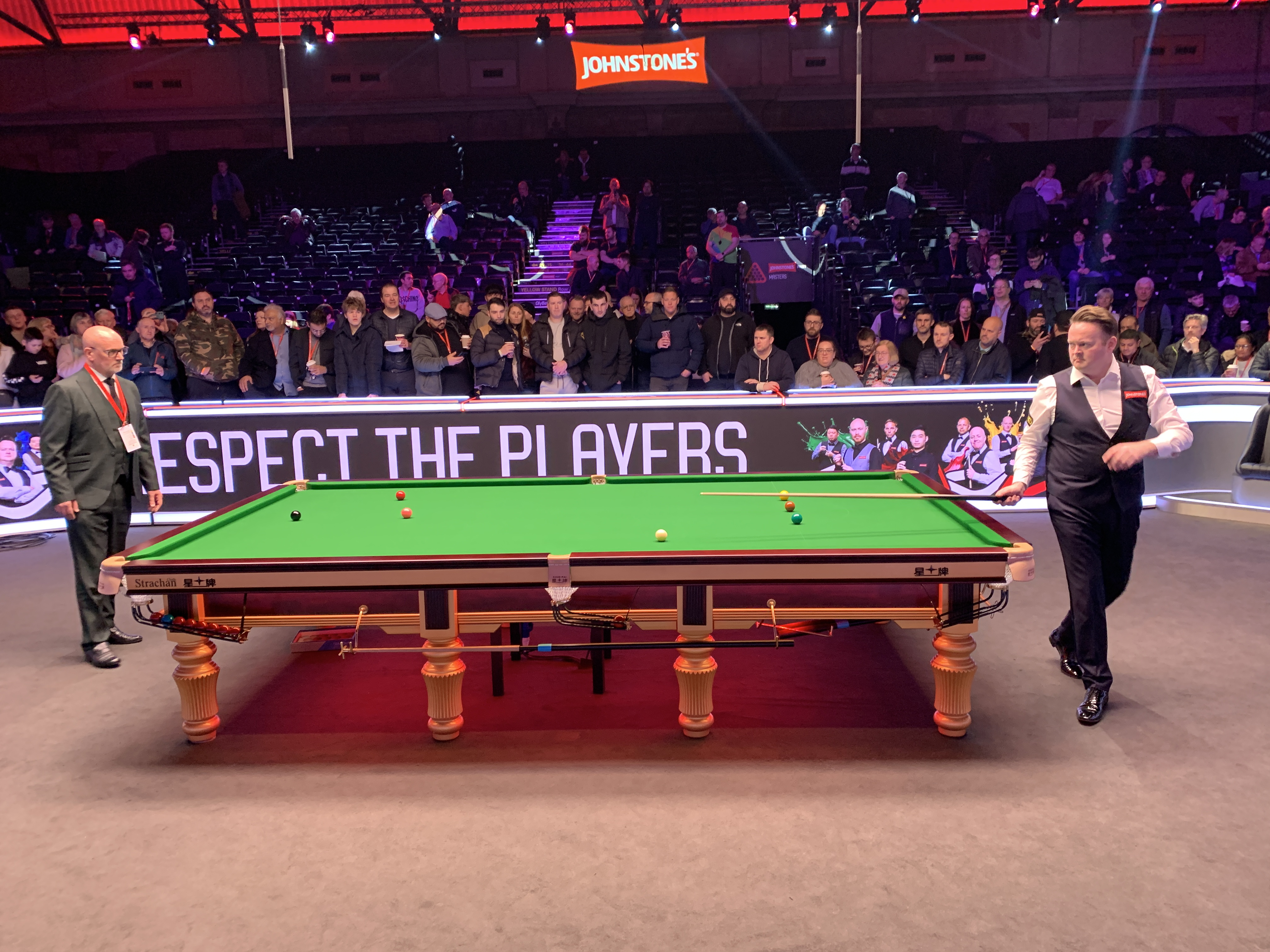
Shaun Murphy (right; pictured in 2025), recent winner of the 2025 British Open, lost to Northern Irish player Jordan Brown.

Allen made a century of 137 in the opening frame against Hill. Hill won the second, but Allen took three in a row to win 4–1 and reach the 70th ranking quarter-final of his career. Having won the third frame after a safety battle on the last red, Allen said afterwards: "[Hill] could have gone 2–1 up. I pinched that frame and that turned the match." Trump made breaks of 132, 95, and 83 as he beat Gary Wilson 4–1 to reach his 104th ranking quarter-final, his first of the season. On the 31st anniversary of his first ranking title win, Higgins made four half-century breaks as he defeated Si Jiahui 4–1 to reach his 153rd ranking quarter-final. "You need a good all-round game against Si because he's such a dangerous player," said Higgins afterwards. "I had a few bits of luck during the game which helps in a best of seven." Tom Ford progressed with a 4–2 victory over Yuan. Zhou received a walkover to the quarter-finals after Carter withdrew for personal reasons.

Facing Murphy, Brown won the first three frames with breaks including 70 and 61, but Murphy secured the next two with breaks of 55 and 135. Brown took the sixth frame on the colours to win 4–2 and secure his fourth appearance in a ranking quarter-final. "I am over the moon," said Brown afterwards. "I was so solid to 3–0, then I made a couple of mistakes and [Murphy] played well. So at 3–2 I was under it. I stayed patient and disciplined and waited for a chance." Kyren Wilson produced breaks of 63, 75, 77, and 53 as he defeated He 4–2. "I was solid when I needed to be and scored heavily," said Wilson. Lisowski lost two of the first three frames against Un-Nooh, but recovered to win three in a row, making breaks including 94 and 76 as he completed a 4–2 win. It was the first time Lisowski had reached a ranking quarter-final since the 2025 Welsh Open eight months earlier.

=== Quarter-finals ===
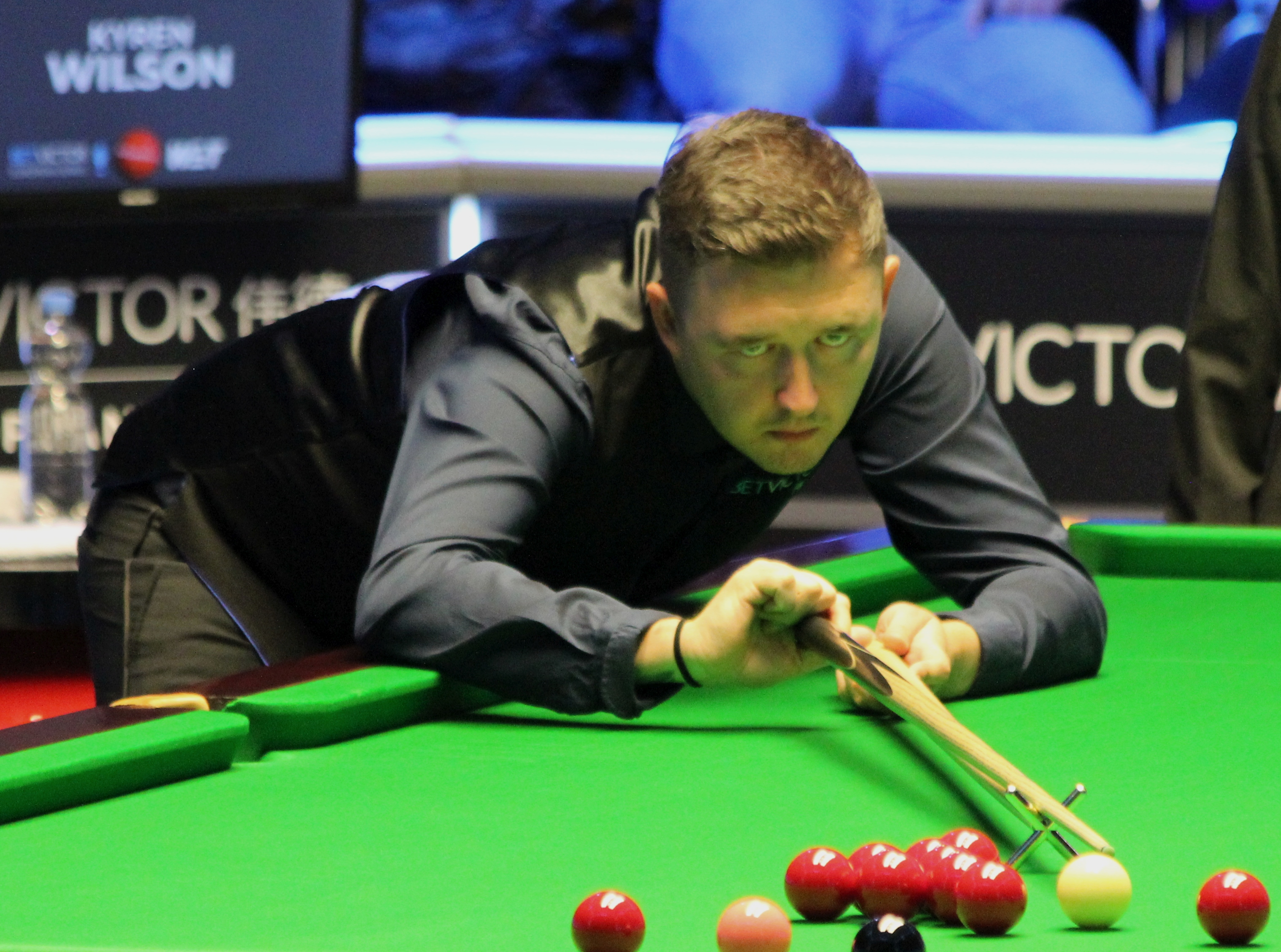
The defending champion Kyren Wilson (pictured in 2022) lost in the quarter-finals to Jack Lisowski.

The quarter-finals were the best of nine frames. Facing Lisowski, the defending champion Kyren Wilson took the opening frame with a 68 break. Lisowski then made breaks including 63 and 68 as he won three in a row for a 3–1 lead. Wilson won frame five with a 70 break, but Lisowski produced a century of 104 to lead 4–2. Wilson took frame seven after Lisowski missed the second-last red along the baulk cushion, but Lisowski made a 76 break in frame eight to secure a 5–3 victory. Afterwards, Lisowski commented that trying a different brand of cue tip had played a role in improving his performances. "I have been trying for years to find the right one," he said. "I am excited about it. It gets a lot of spin on the white [and] it's very accurate and consistent." Higgins won the first frame against Trump with a 61 break. Trump won the next two with breaks of 93 and 82, but Higgins tied the scores at 2–2 at the mid-session interval. However, Higgins scored just 19 points over the remainder of the match as Trump made breaks of 72, 72, and 121 to secure a 5–2 victory. It was the 13th consecutive time Trump had beaten Higgins in a ranking tournament, having last lost to Higgins at a ranking event in 2018. "My scoring was the difference today," said Trump. "After the interval my long potting was great and I scored heavily. I feel my game has taken a forward step here. No matter what happens, I feel a lot more comfortable with my cue and how I am playing."

In a match between two Antrim players, Allen won the first frame against Brown with a century of 101. Brown made a century of 131 to win the second, but Allen took the next two frames to lead 3–1 at the mid-session interval. Brown won frame five with a century of 120 and had an opportunity to win the sixth from behind, but he missed the second-last red, and Allen took the frame for a 4–2 lead. In frame seven, Brown had a 41-point lead when he missed a black off its spot, allowing Allen to secure a 5–2 victory with a 71 clearance. "I was relieved to get over the line," said Allen, who advanced to his 44th ranking semi-final. Commenting on defeating his good friend and practice partner Brown, Allen said: "I don't get much enjoyment out of beating [Brown] because I always support him otherwise." Ford won the first two frames against Zhou, making breaks of 90 and 60, but Zhou tied the scores at 2–2. Ford again moved two frames ahead at 4–2, making an 82 break in frame six, but Zhou produced breaks of 59 and 66 to tie the scores at 4–4. Ford took the lead in the deciding frame but missed a red while on a break of 53, and Zhou produced a match-winning clearance of 77 to advance to his eighth ranking semi-final. "It's a big win for me, because I didn't feel as if I had good touch today, to be able to turn things around," Zhou said afterwards.

=== Semi-finals ===
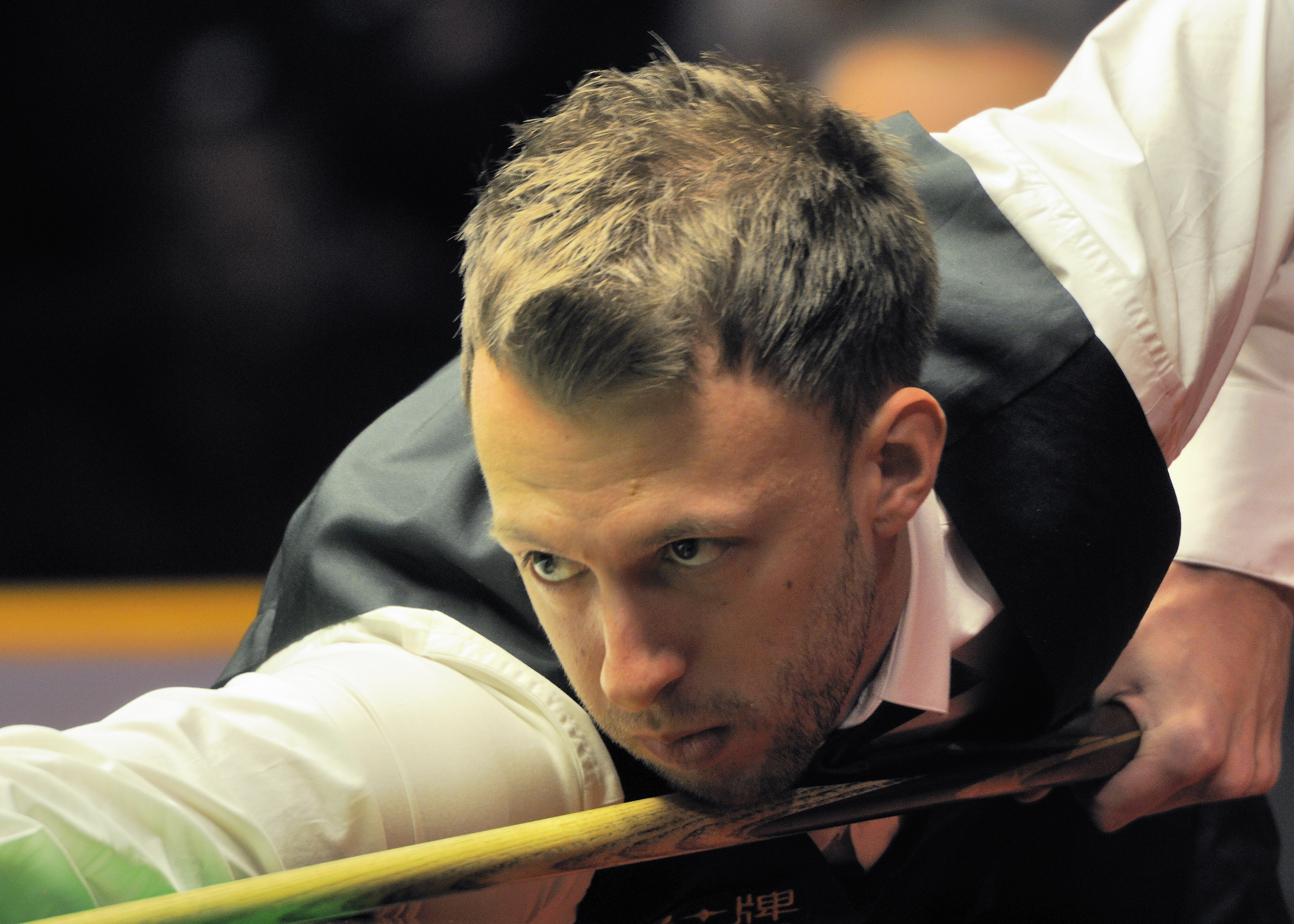
The world number one Judd Trump (pictured in 2014) defeated Mark Allen to reach his 50th ranking final.

The semi-finals were the best of 11 frames. Facing Zhou in the first semi-final, Lisowski won the opening frame on the colours after laying a snooker on the last brown. Zhou scored just five points across the next three frames as Lisowski made breaks of 125, 124, and 66 to extend his lead to 4–0 at the mid-session interval. Zhou won the fifth frame after a safety battle on the last blue, but Lisowski took the sixth with a century of 125. In the seventh frame, Lisowski missed a red while on a break of 40, and Zhou responded with a break of 59 before playing safe. Lisowski fluked the last red and went on to complete a 6–1 victory. "I feel like I can pot any ball at the moment. I'm more surprised when I miss," Lisowski said afterwards. "I have changed my cue, changed my tip, and got a coach with new ideas, so maybe it's a new version of myself. My game is heading in the right direction, which is a relief because I have had a quiet couple of seasons where I have played some really good games but not put a run together."

In the second semi-final, Trump faced Allen. The players shared the first two frames, which lasted 79 minutes. Trump won the third with a 73 break, but Allen then won two in a row with breaks of 68 and 135 to lead 3–2. Trump took the sixth on the colours after laying a snooker on the last green and won the seventh with an 82 break to retake the lead at 4–3. In frame eight, Trump missed a black to a corner pocket while leading by 62 points; Allen had an opportunity to counter, but he lost position with two reds remaining. Trump potted the last red with a cross double and secured the frame, moving one from victory at 5–3. After Allen missed a red to a corner pocket in frame nine, Trump made a 66 break to win a fourth consecutive frame for a 6–3 victory. "[Allen] is very patient and his safety is good," Trump said afterwards. "It was hard to get any rhythm against him at the start, plus I missed a few easy balls. The sixth frame was massive, that was the turning point. I got some momentum after that and my game was a bit more attacking."

=== Final ===
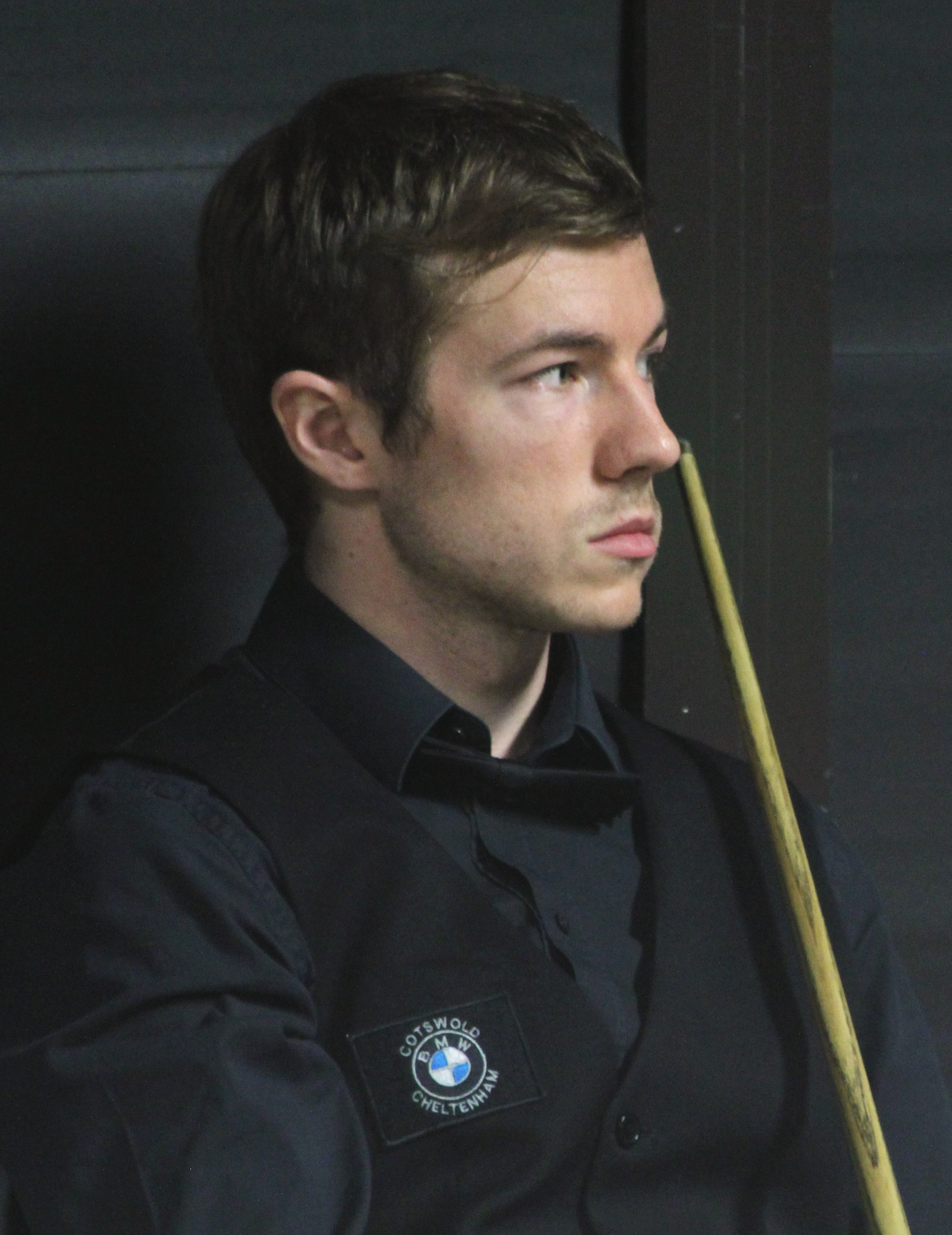
Jack Lisowski (pictured in 2016) defeated Judd Trump 9–8 to win the first ranking title of his professional career.

The final was played as the best of 17 frames, held over two sessions, between the world number one Judd Trump and the world number 29 Jack Lisowski. Trump played in his sixth Northern Ireland Open final, having previously won four titles and been runner-up once, while Lisowski competed in the final of the tournament for the first time. It was Trump's fiftieth ranking final and Lisowski's seventh. The players had contested three previous ranking finals, at the 2020 World Grand Prix, the 2021 German Masters, and the 2021 Gibraltar Open, all of which had been won by Trump. Trump had won their eight previous professional matches. The final was played before 1,435 spectators, a record audience for any UK snooker event outside of the Masters.

Lisowski won the 39-minute opening frame after a safety battle on the colours, but Trump won the second with a 97 break and also took the 48-minute third frame after Lisowski missed the last blue. Lisowski came from 53 points behind to win frame four, tying the scores at 2–2 at the mid-session interval. Trump won frame five after doubling a red to a centre pocket and making a frame-winning break of 36, but Lisowski responded with his seventh century of the tournament, a 112, tying the scores again at 3–3. Lisowski was on a break of 49 in frame seven when he called a push shot foul on himself, and Trump made a frame-winning clearance of 75. In the eighth frame, Trump ran out of position on a break of 48, and Lisowski won the frame with a 62 clearance. The first session ended level at 4–4.

When play resumed for the second session, Trump won the ninth frame, but Lisowski won the tenth after Trump missed the last red. Trump won frame 11 with an 85 break, but Lisowski responded with an 84 to tie the scores at 6–6 at the mid-session interval. Trump took frame 13 after Lisowski missed a pot on the black, but Lisowski made a half-century of 51 in the 14th to tie the scores again at 7–7. In the 15th frame, Lisowski missed a frame-ball black while on a break of 60 but later secured the frame by potting the last red, taking the lead for the first time since 1–0. However, Trump made two breaks of 38 in the 16th to tie the scores at 8–8. In the deciding frame, Lisowski made a 27 break before missing a red. Both players missed opportunities, but Lisowski eventually clinched a 9–8 victory with a match-winning break of 46.

It was the first ranking title of Lisowski's 15-year professional career, following six previous defeats in ranking finals. The players, best friends since the age of 14, embraced after the match. Lisowski, whose father had passed away in March, dedicated the title to his parents. "It's surreal. I can't believe it," he said afterwards. "I'm exhausted and I'm an emotional wreck. I felt like I was going to pass out. It's bizarre, it doesn't feel real and like it's a dream." He added: "Since my dad passed away I feel like it is more serious now. Before, it was a bit of a game, a bit of fun. Now I feel like I have to win for him." He advanced from 29th to 24th in the world rankings after the event. After finishing as runner-up for a second consecutive year, Trump commented: "I am so pleased for [Lisowski]. I am probably a lot happier than I would have been if I had won. I gave it my absolute all. I missed a few shots, but [Lisowski] fully deserved to win. It's nice for him to shut everyone up because he is always being called out [for not having won a ranking title], but no one can say that again."

== Main draw ==
The results of the main draw are shown below. Numbers in parentheses after the players' names denote the players' seeding, an "a" indicates amateur players who were not on the main World Snooker Tour, and players in bold denote match winners.

=== Top half ===
**Last 64**; Best of 7 frames
**Kyren Wilson (ENG) (1)**	**4**
Oliver Lines (ENG)	3
Matthew Selt (ENG) (31)	2
**Ryan Day (WAL)**	**4**
**Wu Yize (CHN) (16)**	**4**
Scott Donaldson (SCO)	3
David Gilbert (ENG) (21)	2
**He Guoqiang (CHN)**	**4**
Joe O'Connor (ENG) (24)	3
**Thepchaiya Un-Nooh (THA)**	**4**
Zhang Anda (CHN) (10)	1
**Mark Davis (ENG)**	**4**
**Jack Lisowski (ENG) (25)**	**4**
Haris Tahir (PAK)	0
**Mark Selby (ENG) (8)**	**4**
Ian Burns (ENG)	1
Mark Williams (WAL) (5) (Note: Mark Williams withdrew and so Long Zehuang received a walkover.)	w/d
**Long Zehuang** (CHN)	**w/o**
**Yuan Sijun (CHN) (27)**	**4**
Daniel Wells (WAL)	1
**Chris Wakelin (ENG) (11)**	**4**
Lan Yuhao (CHN)	1
**Tom Ford** (ENG) (17)	**w/o**
Marco Fu (HKG) (Note: Marco Fu withdrew due to a fractured elbow and so Tom Ford received a walkover.)	w/d
Stuart Bingham (ENG) (18)	2
**Jimmy Robertson (ENG)**	**4**
**Ali Carter (ENG) (14)**	**4**
Stan Moody (ENG)	3
**Zhou Yuelong (CHN) (29)**	**4**
Dylan Emery (WAL)	2
Neil Robertson (AUS) (4) (Note: Neil Robertson withdrew for medical reasons and so David Grace received a walkover.)	w/d
**David Grace** (ENG)	**w/o**

**Last 32**; Best of 7 frames
**(England) Kyren Wilson (1)**	**4**
(Wales) Ryan Day	1
(China) Wu Yize (16)	2
**(China) He Guoqiang**	**4**
**(Thailand) Thepchaiya Un-Nooh**	**4**
(England) Mark Davis	1
**(England) Jack Lisowski (25)**	**4**
(England) Mark Selby (8)	2
(China) Long Zehuang	2
**(China) Yuan Sijun (27)**	**4**
(England) Chris Wakelin (11)	1
**(England) Tom Ford (17)**	**4**
(England) Jimmy Robertson	3
**(England) Ali Carter (14)**	**4**
**(China) Zhou Yuelong (29)**	**4**
(England) David Grace	2

**Last 16**; Best of 7 frames
**(England) Kyren Wilson (1)**	**4**
(China) He Guoqiang	2
(Thailand) Thepchaiya Un-Nooh	2
**(England) Jack Lisowski (25)**	**4**
(China) Yuan Sijun (27)	2
**(England) Tom Ford (17)**	**4**
(England) Ali Carter (14) (Note: Ali Carter withdrew for personal reasons and so Zhou Yuelong received a walkover.)	w/d
(China) **Zhou Yuelong** (29)	**w/o**

**Quarter-finals**; Best of 9 frames
(England) Kyren Wilson (1)	3
**(England) Jack Lisowski (25)**	**5**
(England) Tom Ford (17)	4
**(China) Zhou Yuelong (29)**	**5**

**Semi-finals**; Best of 11 frames
**(England) Jack Lisowski (25)**	**6**
(China) Zhou Yuelong (29)	1

Note: w/d=withdrawn; w/o=walkover

=== Bottom half ===
**Last 64**; Best of 7 frames
**Judd Trump (ENG) (3)**	**4**
Anthony McGill (SCO)	2
**Jackson Page (WAL) (32)**	**4**
Steven Hallworth (ENG)	0
**Gary Wilson (ENG) (15)**	**4**
Chang Bingyu (CHN)	3
Jak Jones (WAL) (19)	3
**Martin O'Donnell (ENG)**	**4**
**Stephen Maguire (SCO) (23)**	**4**
Luca Brecel (BEL)	1
**Si Jiahui (CHN) (12)**	**4**
Cheung Ka Wai (HKG)	0
**Pang Junxu (CHN) (26)**	**4**
Robbie Williams (ENG)	1
**John Higgins (SCO) (6)**	**4**
Louis Heathcote (ENG)	0
**Barry Hawkins (ENG) (7)**	**4**
Zak Surety (ENG)	0
Lei Peifan (CHN) (28)	1
**Aaron Hill (IRL)**	**4**
**Mark Allen (NIR) (9)**	**4**
Robert Milkins (ENG)	3
Hossein Vafaei (IRN) (22)	2
**Ben Woollaston (ENG)**	**4**
**Elliot Slessor (ENG) (20)**	**4**
Fan Zhengyi (CHN)	3
**Shaun Murphy (ENG) (13)**	**4**
David Lilley (ENG)	0
Noppon Saengkham (THA) (30)	2
**Ashley Hugill (ENG) (a)**	**4**
Zhao Xintong (CHN) (2)	0
**Jordan Brown (NIR)**	**4**

**Last 32**; Best of 7 frames
**(England) Judd Trump (3)**	**4**
(Wales) Jackson Page (32)	2
**(England) Gary Wilson (15)**	**4**
(England) Martin O'Donnell	2
(Scotland) Stephen Maguire (23)	0
**(China) Si Jiahui (12)**	**4**
(China) Pang Junxu (26)	3
**(Scotland) John Higgins (6)**	**4**
(England) Barry Hawkins (7)	3
**(Republic of Ireland) Aaron Hill**	**4**
**(Northern Ireland) Mark Allen (9)**	**4**
(England) Ben Woollaston	3
(England) Elliot Slessor (20)	2
**(England) Shaun Murphy (13)**	**4**
(England) Ashley Hugill (a)	0
**(Northern Ireland) Jordan Brown**	**4**

**Last 16**; Best of 7 frames
**(England) Judd Trump (3)**	**4**
(England) Gary Wilson (15)	1
(China) Si Jiahui (12)	1
**(Scotland) John Higgins (6)**	**4**
(Republic of Ireland) Aaron Hill	1
**(Northern Ireland) Mark Allen (9)**	**4**
(England) Shaun Murphy (13)	2
**(Northern Ireland) Jordan Brown**	**4**

**Quarter-finals**; Best of 9 frames
**(England) Judd Trump (3)**	**5**
(Scotland) John Higgins (6)	2
**(Northern Ireland) Mark Allen (9)**	**5**
(Northern Ireland) Jordan Brown	2

**Semi-finals**; Best of 11 frames
**(England) Judd Trump (3)**	**6**
(Northern Ireland) Mark Allen (9)	3

=== Final: frame scores ===
Final: Best of 17 frames. Referee: Rob Spencer; Waterfront Hall, Belfast, Northern Ireland, 26 October 2025
**Jack Lisowski** (25); England	**9**–8	Judd Trump (3); England
Afternoon: **63**–49, 1–**106**, 45–**60**, **67**–53, 36–**71**, **112**–0 (112), 49–**79**, **63**–48; Evening: 0–**82**, **85**–37, 14–**97**, **84**–8, 29–**95**, **87**–0, **70**–30, 0–**81**, **73**–7
(frame 6) **112**	Highest break	97 (frame 2)
**1**	Century breaks	0

== Qualifying rounds ==
The results of the early rounds are shown below. Numbers in parentheses after the players' names denote the players' seeding, an "a" indicates amateur players who were not on the main World Snooker Tour, and players in bold denote match winners.

**Round 1 (Last 128)**; Best of 7 frames
Ken Doherty (IRL) (87)	1
**Yao Pengcheng (CHN) (114)**	**4**
**Allan Taylor (ENG) (69)**	**4**
Chatchapong Nasa (THA) (97)	1
**Antoni Kowalski (POL) (66)**	**4**
Zak Sheldon (NIR) (a)	0
Chris Totten (SCO) (84)	0
**Liam Graham (SCO) (104)**	**4**
**Julien Leclercq (BEL) (73)**	**4**
Florian Nüßle (AUT) (118)	2
**Farakh Ajaib (PAK) (71)**	**4**
Oliver Brown (ENG) (100)	3
**Haris Tahir (PAK) (81)**	**4**
Connor Benzey (ENG) (111)	0
Haydon Pinhey (ENG) (77)	0
**Ian Burns (ENG) (116)**	**4**
Ben Mertens (BEL) (65)	0
**Liam Pullen (ENG) (105)**	**4**
**Sunny Akani (THA) (67)**	**4**
Xu Yichen (CHN) (120)	2
**Lan Yuhao (CHN) (89)**	**4**
Mahmoud El Hareedy (EGY) (123)	2
Amir Sarkhosh (IRN) (70)	2
**Marco Fu (HKG) (121)**	**4**
**Jonas Luz (BRA) (93)**	**4**
Kreishh Gurbaxani (IND) (102)	3
**Reanne Evans** (ENG) (95)	**w/o**
Mohammed Shehab (UAE) (98) (Note: Mohammed Shehab withdrew from qualifying and so Reanne Evans received a walkover.)	w/d
**Dylan Emery (WAL) (91)**	**4**
Liam Highfield (ENG) (99)	1
Bai Yulu (CHN) (90)	2
**David Grace (ENG) (107)**	**4**

**Round 2 (Last 96)**; Best of 7 frames
**Oliver Lines (ENG) (61)**	**4**
Yao Pengcheng (CHN) (114)	2
**Ryan Day (WAL) (34)**	**4**
Allan Taylor (ENG) (69)	1
**Scott Donaldson (SCO) (54)**	**4**
Antoni Kowalski (POL) (66)	2
**He Guoqiang (CHN) (43)**	**4**
Liam Graham (SCO) (104)	0
**Thepchaiya Un-Nooh (THA) (41)**	**4**
Julien Leclercq (BEL) (73)	3
**Mark Davis (ENG) (53)**	**4**
Farakh Ajaib (PAK) (71)	0
Lyu Haotian (CHN) (36)	3
**Haris Tahir (PAK) (81)**	**4**
Sanderson Lam (ENG) (57)	2
**Ian Burns (ENG) (116)**	**4**
**Long Zehuang (CHN) (51)**	**4**
Liam Pullen (ENG) (105)	2
**Daniel Wells (WAL) (42)**	**4**
Sunny Akani (THA) (67)	3
Michael Holt (ENG) (62)	2
**Lan Yuhao (CHN) (89)**	**4**
Jamie Jones (WAL) (45)	2
**Marco Fu (HKG) (121)**	**4**
**Jimmy Robertson (ENG) (33)**	**4**
Jonas Luz (BRA) (93)	0
**Stan Moody (ENG) (58)**	**4**
Reanne Evans (ENG) (95)	0
Xu Si (CHN) (39)	3
**Dylan Emery (WAL) (91)**	**4**
Gong Chenzhi (CHN) (63)	0
**David Grace (ENG) (107)**	**4**

**Round 1 (Last 128)**; Best of 7 frames
Iulian Boiko (UKR) (83)	2
**Alexander Ursenbacher (SUI) (108)**	**4**
**Steven Hallworth (ENG) (82)**	**4**
Ross Muir (SCO) (103)	0
**Chang Bingyu (CHN) (75)**	**4**
Jiang Jun (CHN) (117)	0
**Sam Craigie (ENG) (86)**	**4**
Joel Connolly (NIR) (a)	1
**Liam Davies (WAL) (74)**	**4**
Ng On-yee (HKG) (106)	1
**Cheung Ka Wai (HKG) (78)**	**4**
Mink Nutcharut (THA) (101)	1
**Huang Jiahao (CHN) (80)**	**4**
Jimmy White (ENG) (122)	2
**Louis Heathcote (ENG) (88)**	**4**
Sahil Nayyar (CAN) (113)	0
Robbie McGuigan (NIR) (79)	3
**Fergal Quinn (NIR) (110)**	**4**
**Gao Yang (CHN) (92)**	**4**
Liu Wenwei (CHN) (115)	1
Michał Szubarczyk (POL) (96)	1
**Patrick Whelan (ENG) (a)**	**4**
Wang Yuchen (HKG) (68)	3
**Mateusz Baranowski (POL) (119)**	**4**
**Artemijs Žižins (LAT) (72)**	**4**
Zhao Hanyang (CHN) (109)	2
Bulcsú Révész (HUN) (76)	2
**Leone Crowley (IRL) (112)**	**4**
Hatem Yassen (EGY) (94)	1
**Ashley Hugill (ENG) (a)**	**4**
**Mitchell Mann (ENG) (85)**	**4**
Umut Dikme (GER) (a)	3

**Round 2 (Last 96)**; Best of 7 frames
**Anthony McGill (SCO) (55)**	**4**
Alexander Ursenbacher (SUI) (108)	1
Matthew Stevens (WAL) (47)	3
**Steven Hallworth (ENG) (82)**	**4**
Ishpreet Singh Chadha (IND) (59)	0
**Chang Bingyu (CHN) (75)**	**4**
**Martin O'Donnell (ENG) (40)**	**4**
Sam Craigie (ENG) (86)	2
**Luca Brecel (BEL) (37)**	**4**
Liam Davies (WAL) (74)	0
Liu Hongyu (CHN) (52)	1
**Cheung Ka Wai (HKG) (78)**	**4**
**Robbie Williams (ENG) (46)**	**4**
Huang Jiahao (CHN) (80)	1
Duane Jones (WAL) (64) (Note: In the qualifying match between Louis Heathcote and Duane Jones, Jones lost the fifth frame on the three‑miss rule, so that the WST match record shows the frame as a 57–45 points win for Jones.)	2
**Louis Heathcote (ENG) (88)**	**4**
**Zak Surety (ENG) (60)**	**4**
Fergal Quinn (NIR) (110)	3
**Aaron Hill (IRL) (44)**	**4**
Gao Yang (CHN) (92)	1
**Robert Milkins (ENG) (50)**	**4**
Patrick Whelan (ENG) (a)	2
**Ben Woollaston (ENG) (35)**	**4**
Mateusz Baranowski (POL) (119)	0
**Fan Zhengyi (CHN) (48)**	**4**
Artemijs Žižins (LAT) (72)	2
**David Lilley (ENG) (56)**	**4**
Leone Crowley (IRL) (112)	3
Ricky Walden (ENG) (38)	3
**Ashley Hugill (ENG) (a)**	**4**
**Jordan Brown (NIR) (49)**	**4**
Mitchell Mann (ENG) (85)	2

Note: w/d=withdrawn; w/o=walkover

== Century breaks ==
=== Main stage centuries ===
A total of 38 century breaks were made during the main stage of the tournament in Belfast.

- 137, 135, 135, 113, 104, 101, 100 – Mark Allen
- 137, 135, 132, 100 – Ali Carter
- 137 – Pang Junxu
- 135, 133 – Kyren Wilson
- 135, 115 – Shaun Murphy
- 134, 109 – Aaron Hill
- 132, 121 – Judd Trump
- 131, 120 – Jordan Brown
- 129 – Mark Selby
- 126 – John Higgins
- 125, 125, 124, 112, 112, 104, 103 – Jack Lisowski
- 120 – He Guoqiang
- 119 – Fan Zhengyi
- 118 – Mark Davis
- 118 – Joe O'Connor
- 115 – Chris Wakelin
- 103 – Martin O'Donnell
- 102 – Yuan Sijun

=== Qualifying stage centuries ===
A total of 26 century breaks were made during the qualifying stage of the tournament in Leicester.

- 143, 100 – Liam Pullen
- 138 – Liu Hongyu
- 136, 102 – Steven Hallworth
- 134 – Sunny Akani
- 132 – Ashley Hugill
- 130 – Ian Burns
- 128, 114, 104 – Marco Fu
- 127 – Scott Donaldson
- 126 – Robbie Williams
- 122 – Chang Bingyu
- 119 – Yao Pengcheng
- 115, 103 – Lan Yuhao
- 109 – Jimmy Robertson
- 109 – Ben Woollaston
- 106 – Jordan Brown
- 106 – Mahmoud El Hareedy
- 106 – Oliver Lines
- 104 – He Guoqiang
- 104 – Zak Surety
- 103 – Sam Craigie
- 103 – Aaron Hill
