= Long Zehuang =

Chinese snooker player

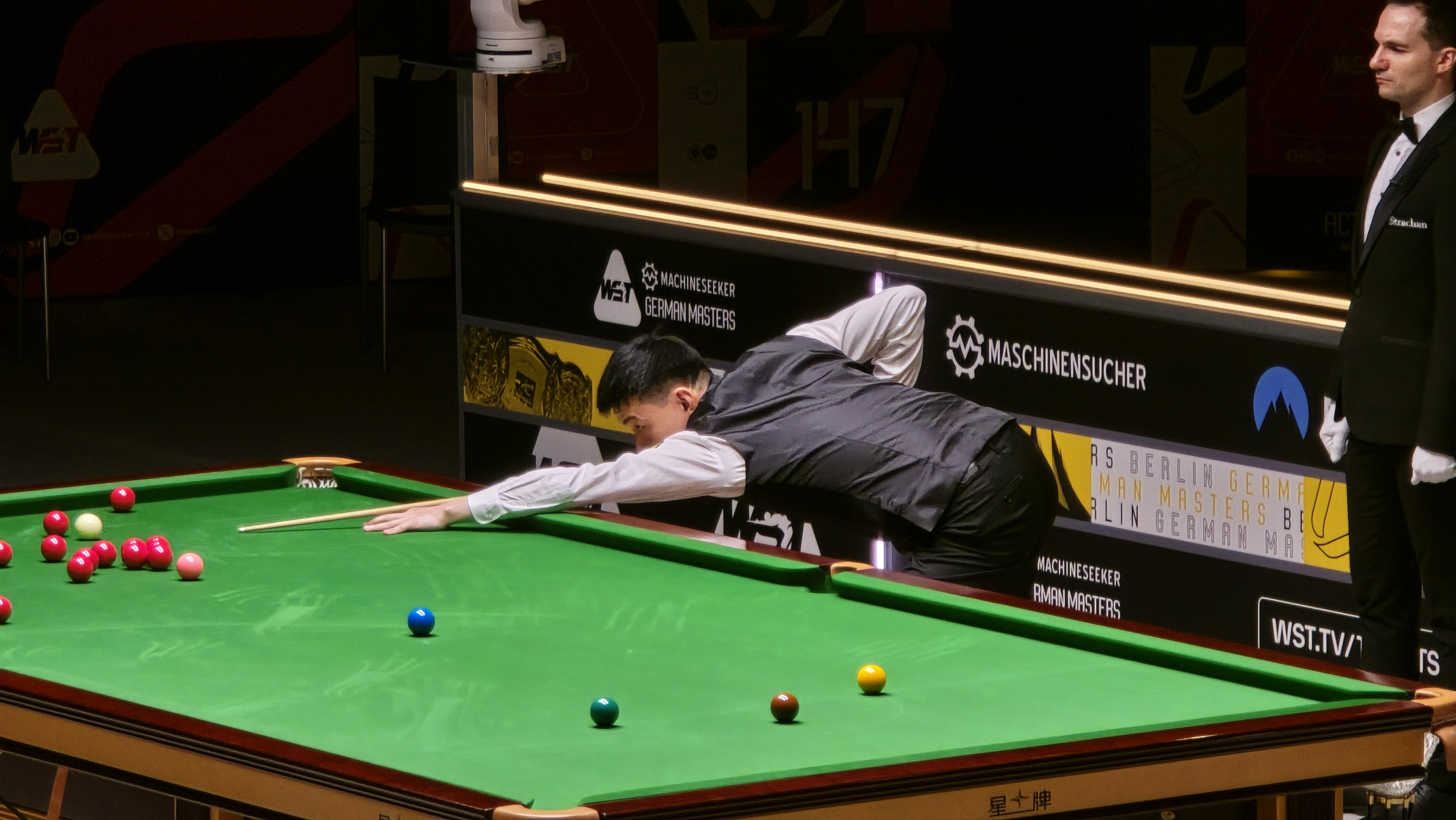

Personal information
- Born: 28 December 1996 (age 29) Wuhan, Hubei, China

Sport
- Country: China
- Sport: Snooker
- Professional: 2023–present
- Highest ranking: 49 (March 2026)
- Current ranking: 58 (as of 26 October 2026)
- Best ranking finish: Semi-final (2024 Wuhan Open)

Long Zehuang
- Simplified Chinese: 龙泽煌
- Traditional Chinese: 龍澤煌
Transcriptions
Standard Mandarin
- Hanyu Pinyin: Lóng Zéhuáng
Yue: Cantonese
- Yale Romanization: Lùhng Jaahk Wòhng
- Jyutping: Lung⁴ Zaak⁶ Wong⁴

Long Zehuang (Chinese: 龙泽煌; born 28 December 1996) is a Chinese snooker player. He achieved a place on the World Snooker Tour starting from the 2023–24 snooker season.

== Career ==
Before becoming a professional snooker player, Long won the 2015 WPA World Nine-ball Junior Championship when he was 18 years old.

Long played at the 2018 Haining Open, beating Liu Hongyu before losing to Cai Jianzhong.

He came close to qualifying for the Snooker World Tour in June 2019 but lost the final match in the final round of Q school to Barry Pinches.

He won a place on the 2023-24 World Snooker Tour by qualifying from the CBSA qualifying events held in Beijing in April 2023. His place was earned with a victory over former professional Chen Feilong in the final qualifying round

=== 2023/24 ===
Long made his debut in a professional draw at the 2023 Championship League held at the Morningside Arena in Leicester, England from 26 June 2023. He made an auspicious start, going unbeaten in the round-robin group. He earned a credible draw against Jackson Page, before defeating world number 12 Ali Carter, and young Welshman Ryan Davies, to top the group and progress to the next stage. In the second round-robin he went undefeated, drawing with Sam Craigie, Jak Jones and Michael White. He secured a place at the latter stages of the World Open, winning 5-4 against Thepchaiya Un-Nooh. In the first round of qualifying for the 2024 World Snooker Championship he defeated Sydney Wilson 10-1.

=== 2024/25 ===
He won all three of his matches in the group stage at the 2024 Championship League in Leicester in June 2024. He then also topped his round-robin group that included Shaun Murphy and Hossein Vafaei in the second stage, to reach the last eight of a ranking tournament for the first time. In July 2024, he defeated former world champion Mark Selby before later reaching the semi final of the 2024 Wuhan Open with wins over Ben Woollaston and Jack Lisowski. At the 2024 English Open in Brentwood in September 2024 he reached the last-64 where he was defeated by Mark Allen. He reached the last 64 at the 2024 Northern Ireland Open. He was defeated 10-8 by Zhao Xintong in qualifying for the 2025 World Championship.

=== 2025/26 ===
He started the 2025-26 season in June 2025 in the qualifying round for the Wuhan Open with a 5-3 defeat to Welshman Dylan Emery before beating Thepchaiya Un-Nooh in a deciding frame in the qualifier for the 2025 British Open completing a clearance under pressure from 51-5 down in the final frame. He was drawn in the round-robin stage of the 2025 Championship League against Lei Peifan, Mateusz Baranowski and English amateur Ryan Davies, finishing second in the group.

In November, he reached the last-32 at the 2025 UK Championship with an upset 6-1 win over Aaron Hill and a 6-5 win over Louis Heathcote. At the main stages in York, he was defeated by defending world champion Zhao Xintong. He reached the third round of qualifying for the 2026 World Snooker Championship with a 10-2 win over Fergal Quinn, but was defeated 10-8 by compatriot He Guoqiang.

=== 2026/27 ===
In September, he reached the last-16 of the 2026 British Open.

== Performance and rankings timeline ==
| Tournament | 2023/ 24 | 2024/ 25 | 2025/ 26 | 2026/ 27 |
|---|---|---|---|---|
| Ranking (Note: It shows the ranking at the beginning of the season) | (Note: New players on the Main Tour don't have a ranking) | 73 | 58 | 50 |
Ranking tournaments
| Championship League | 2R | 3R | RR | RR |
| China Open | Not Held | | | LQ |
| Wuhan Open | LQ | SF | LQ | LQ |
| British Open | LQ | 1R | 1R | 3R |
| English Open | LQ | 1R | LQ | LQ |
| Shenzhen Open (Note: The event was called the Xi'an Grand Prix (2024/2025–2025/2026)) | NH | LQ | 1R | LQ |
| Northern Ireland Open | LQ | 2R | 2R | LQ |
| International Championship | 1R | LQ | LQ | 1R |
| UK Championship | LQ | LQ | 1R | |
| Shoot Out | 4R | 2R | 1R | |
| Scottish Open | LQ | 3R | LQ | LQ |
| German Masters | LQ | LQ | LQ | |
| Welsh Open | 1R | LQ | 1R | |
| World Grand Prix | DNQ | DNQ | DNQ | |
| Players Championship | DNQ | DNQ | DNQ | |
| World Open | 2R | 1R | 1R | |
| Tour Championship | DNQ | DNQ | DNQ | |
| World Championship | LQ | LQ | LQ | |
Former ranking tournaments
| European Masters | LQ | Not Held | | |
| Saudi Arabia Masters | NH | 2R | 5R | NH |

Performance Table Legend
| LQ | lost in the qualifying draw | #R | lost in the early rounds of the tournament (WR = Wildcard round, RR = Round robin) | QF | lost in the quarter-finals |
| SF | lost in the semi-finals | F | lost in the final | W | won the tournament |
| DNQ | did not qualify for the tournament | A | did not participate in the tournament | WD | withdrew from the tournament |

| NH / Not Held | means an event was not held. |
| NR / Non-Ranking Event | means an event is/was no longer a ranking event. |
| R / Ranking Event | means an event is/was a ranking event. |
| MR / Minor-Ranking Event | means an event is/was a minor-ranking event. |
| PA / Pro-am Event | means an event is/was a pro-am event. |
