= 2024 World Open (snooker) =

Snooker tournament

2024 Huading Nylon World Open

Tournament information
- Dates: 18–24 March 2024
- Venue: Yushan Sport Centre
- City: Yushan
- Country: China
- Organisation: World Snooker Tour
- Format: Ranking event
- Total prize fund: £815,000
- Winner's share: £170,000
- Highest break: Zak Surety (ENG) (147)

Final
- Champion: Judd Trump (ENG)
- Runner-up: Ding Junhui (CHN)
- Score: 10–4

The 2024 World Open (officially the 2024 Huading Nylon World Open) was a professional snooker tournament that took place from 18 to 24 March 2024 at the Yushan Sport Centre in Yushan, China. The fifth edition of the World Open held in Yushan since 2016, it marked the return of the event to the tour after a four-year hiatus due to the COVID‑19 pandemic. It was the 15th ranking event of the 2023‍–‍24 season, following the Players Championship and preceding the Tour Championship. It was also the fourth and last major tournament of the season to be held in China, following the International Championship. Organised by the World Snooker Tour and sponsored by Huading Nylon, the event was broadcast by CCTV-5, Migu, and Huya domestically, and by other broadcasters worldwide. The winner received £170,000 from a total prize fund of £815,000.

Judd Trump won the previous edition, having defeated Thepchaiya Un-Nooh 10‍–‍5 in the final of the 2019 event. He successfully defended the title, beating Ding Junhui 10‍–‍4 in the final, and claimed his 28th career ranking title to equal the number won by Steve Davis. It was Trump's fifth ranking title of the season, following his wins at the 2023 English Open, the 2023 Wuhan Open, the 2023 Northern Ireland Open, and the 2024 German Masters. It was also the third time Trump had won five or more ranking titles in a single season, having done so in the 2019‍–‍20 and the 2020‍–‍21 seasons. The only other players that have achieved the feat were Stephen Hendry in 1990‍–‍94, Ding in 2013‍–‍14, Mark Selby in 2016‍–‍17, and Ronnie O'Sullivan in 2017‍–‍18.

The main stage of the event produced 95 century breaks, with an additional 34 made in the qualifying matches played in Barnsley, England. The highest break was a Zak Surety's first career maximum break, compiled during his held‑over match against Ding.

== Format ==
The 2024 World Open was a professional snooker tournament that took place from 18 to 24 March 2024 at the Yushan Sport Centre in Yushan, China. The 15th ranking event of the 2023‍–‍24 season, and the fourth and last major tournament of the season to be held in China, the tournament was the fifth edition of the World Open held in Yushan since 2016, marking its return to the tour after a four-year hiatus due to the COVID‑19 pandemic. Originally created in 1982 as the Professional Players Tournament, the tournament was held in the UK as the Grand Prix and LG Cup from 1984 to 2009, and was renamed the World Open in 2010. China hosted the event from 2012 to 2014 in Haikou, and in Yushan since 2016.

Judd Trump won the previous edition, having defeated Thepchaiya Un-Nooh 10‍–‍5 in the final of the 2019 event. He successfully defended the title, beating Ding Junhui 10‍–‍4 in the final.

Qualification for the tournament took place from 22 to 24 January at the Barnsley Metrodome in Barnsley, England. Qualifying matches involving defending champion Trump, reigning World Champion Luca Brecel, the two highest‑ranked Chinese players (Ding and Zhang Anda), and four Chinese wildcards (Wang Xinbo, Wang Xinzhong, Gong Chenzhi, and Lan Yuhao) were held over to be played at the main venue in Yushan. All matches were played as the best of nine frames until the semi‑finals, which were the best of 11. The final was a best of 19 frames match played over two sessions.

=== Broadcasters ===
The qualifying matches were broadcast domestically by Migu and Huya in China; by Discovery+ in Europe (including the UK and Ireland); and Matchroom.live in all other territories.

The main stage of the event was broadcast domestically by CCTV-5, Migu, and Huya in China; by Eurosport and Discovery+ in Europe (including the UK and Ireland); Now TV in Hong Kong; True Sports in Thailand; Sportcast in Taiwan; and Matchroom.live in all other territories.

=== Prize fund ===
The breakdown of prize money for the event is shown below:

- Winner: £170,000
- Runner-up: £73,000
- Semi-final: £32,500
- Quarter-final: £21,500
- Last 16: £14,000
- Last 32: £9,000
- Last 64: £5,000
- Highest break: £5,000
- Total: £815,000

== Summary ==
=== Qualifying ===
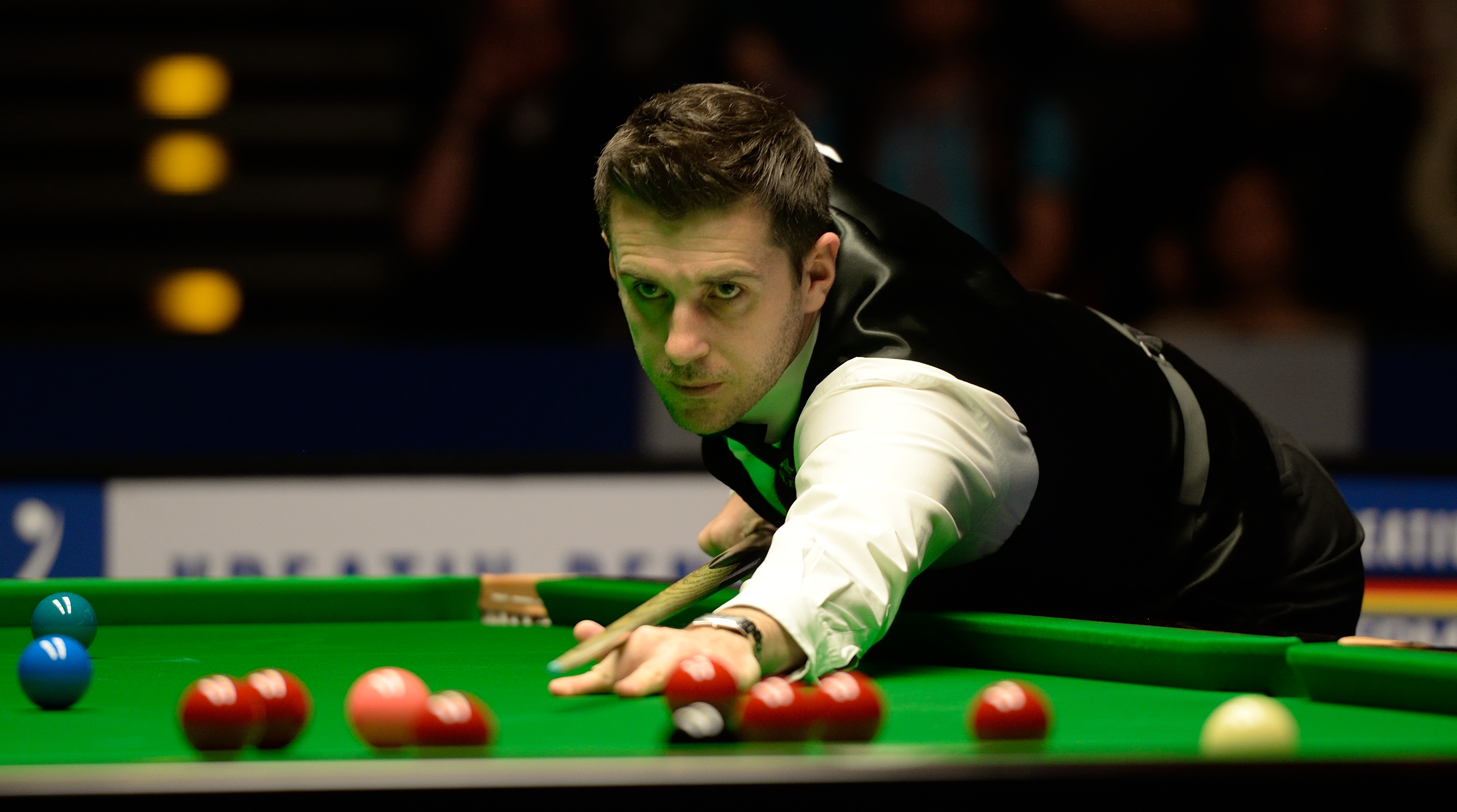
Mark Selby (pictured) compiled his 800th career century break during his 5‍–‍3 win over Xing Zihao. He became the fifth player to reach this milestone.

Qualification for the tournament took place at the Barnsley Metrodome in Barnsley, England. All matches were played from 22 to 24 January as the best of nine frames.

Ricky Walden made breaks of 95, 66, and a century break of 101 in a whitewash victory over Peng Yisong. Replacing Mark Williams, who withdrew from the tournament, Ukrainian amateur Iulian Boiko defeated the reigning Women's World Champion Baipat Siripaporn 5‍–‍1. Marco Fu made a 139 break but lost 3‍–‍5 to Dominic Dale. Ryan Day trailed Andrew Higginson 1‍–‍4, but took four frames in a row to win 5‍–‍4. Mark Selby defeated Xing Zihao 5‍–‍3, making breaks of 130 and 101. The 130 was Selby's 800th career century, making him the fifth player to reach that milestone, after Ronnie O'Sullivan, John Higgins, Judd Trump, and Neil Robertson. Trailing Aaron Hill 2‍–‍4, Joe O'Connor made breaks of 73 and 124 to tie the scores, but Hill took the deciding frame with a 64 break. Neil Robertson made breaks of 99, 57, 66, 74, and 121 to whitewash Victor Sarkis. The 50th seed Anthony Hamilton lost 3‍–‍5 to the 105th seed Jenson Kendrick.

Kyren Wilson made three consecutive centuries of 114, 113, and 121 as he whitewashed Jimmy White. Xiao Guodong won the first frame against Sean O'Sullivan with a 107 break, but O'Sullivan took the next five to win 5‍–‍1. Lyu Haotian made breaks of 90, 106, 101, and 137 to defeat Ashley Carty 5‍–‍2. After trailing the 95th seed Stuart Carrington 1‍–‍4, the 17th seed Gary Wilson tied the scores at 4‍–‍4, but Carrington won the deciding frame. Shaun Murphy made breaks of 70, 127, 112, and 56 as he whitewashed Mohamed Ibrahim; his maximum break attempt in the fourth frame ended at 112 after he snookered himself on the last red. The 107th seed Louis Heathcote whitewashed 55th seed Oliver Lines. Ronnie O'Sullivan, who had won the 2024 World Grand Prix two days earlier, defeated Alfie Burden 5‍–‍3.

Cao Yupeng made breaks of 99, 104, 71, and 88 as he whitewashed Rory McLeod, who had replaced John Astley. The 77th seed He Guoqiang defeated 36th seed Jimmy Robertson 5‍–‍2. The 37th seed Thepchaiya Un-Nooh led 98th seed Long Zehuang 4‍–‍3, but Long forced a deciding frame, which he won on the last black. The 99th seed Adam Duffy defeated 60th seed Mark Davis 5‍–‍4 in a deciding frame. The 26th seed Stuart Bingham lost 3‍–‍5 to 92nd seed Ishpreet Singh Chadha. Lukas Kleckers, the 74th seed, made a 133 break in a 5‍–‍2 victory over the 16th seed Jack Lisowski. The 24th seed Anthony McGill won the first frame against the 69th seed Ashley Hugill, but Hugill won five consecutive frames for a 5‍–‍1 victory. David Lilley defeated Scott Donaldson 5‍–‍3.

=== Early rounds ===
==== Held-over matches ====
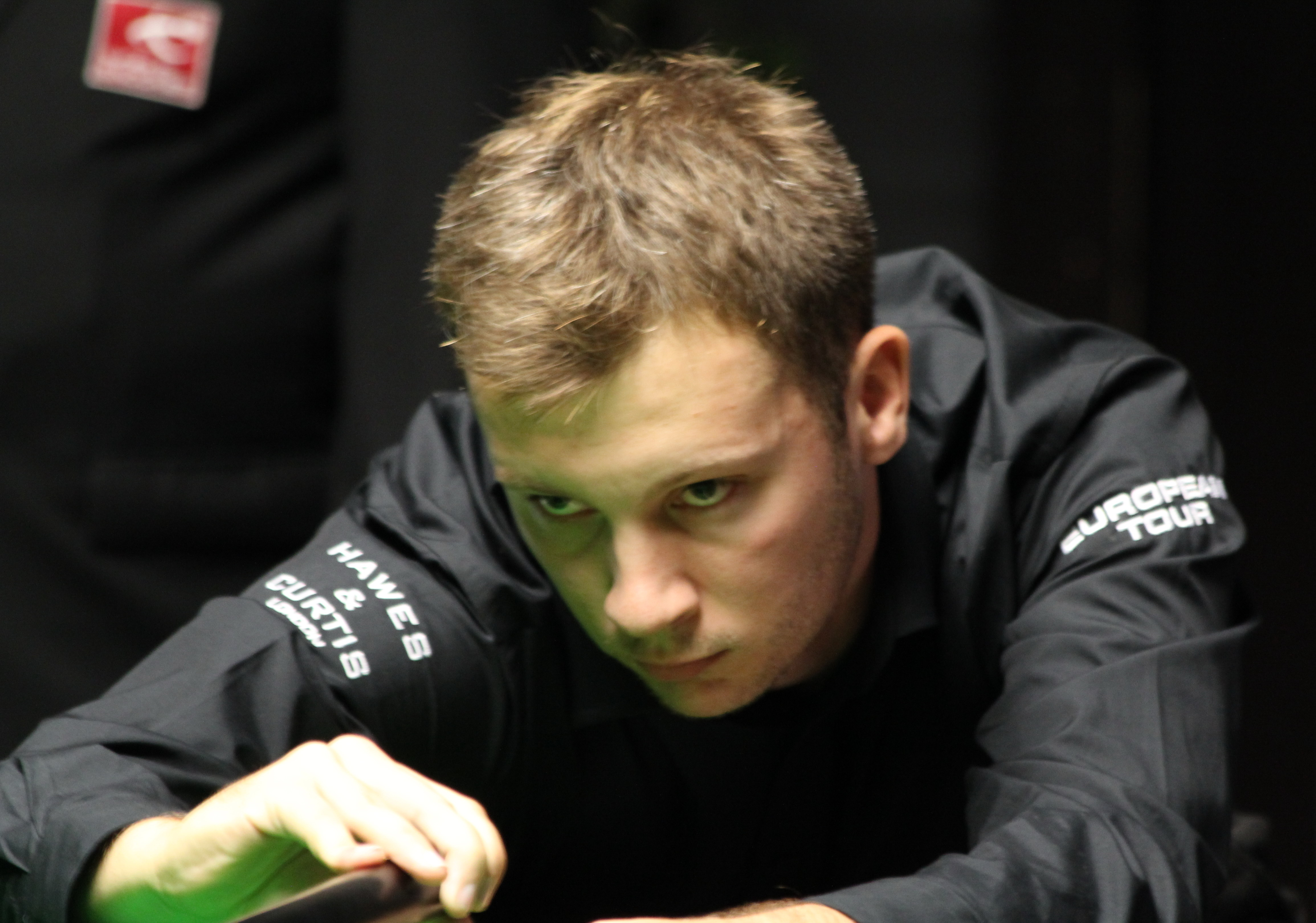
Zak Surety (pictured) compiled his first maximum break, but was defeated 3‍–‍5 by Ding Junhui.

Matches involving defending champion Trump, reigning World Champion Luca Brecel, the two highest‑ranked Chinese players Ding Junhui and Zhang Anda, and four Chinese wildcards (Wang Xinbo, Wang Xinzhong, Gong Chenzhi, and Lan Yuhao) were held over and played at the main venue in Yushan. The held‑over matches were played on 18 March as the best of nine frames.

Brecel made breaks of 131, 100, and 94 to defeat Manasawin Phetmalaikul 5‍–‍1. Wildcard player Wang Xinbo beat his younger brother and fellow wildcard Wang Xinzhong 5‍–‍1 in the pre‑qualifying match, setting up a meeting with 29th seed Matthew Selt later the same day. From 1‍–‍3 behind at the mid‑session interval, Selt won three frames in a row to lead 4‍–‍3, but Wang Xinbo took the next two frames to win 5‍–‍4, making a 118 break in the final and deciding frame. Another Chinese wildcard player Gong Chenzhi lost to Sanderson Lam 4‍–‍5 on the last pink. Rory Thor made four 50+ breaks, but Trump claimed a 5‍–‍2 victory with breaks of 130 and 108. Allan Taylor made a 102 break against Zhang, and went on to lead 3‍–‍1 at the mid‑session interval, but Zhang won four consecutive frames for a 5‍–‍3 victory. Zak Surety compiled a maximum break in the seventh frame of the match against Ding, the first of his career, but was defeated 3‍–‍5.

==== Last 64 ====
The last-64 matches were played from 18 to 19 March as the best of nine frames. Louis Heathcote made a 110 break to lead Ali Carter 2‍–‍0, but Carter won five of the next six frames with breaks of 114 and 135 to capture a 5‍–‍3 victory. Leading Graeme Dott 4‍–‍1, Hossein Vafaei attempted a maximum break in the sixth frame. He missed the 12th red to end the break at 88, but secured the frame and match 5‍–‍1. Despite making two century breaks of 108 and 114, the 18th seed Tom Ford was beaten by Robbie Williams 5‍–‍4. Joe Perry claimed a 5‍–‍1 victory over Sean O'Sullivan, having made a 50+ break in each of the five frames that he won. Facing 28th seed Si Jiahui, who was runner‑up at the German Masters in February, Long took four frames in a row to win 5‍–‍2, making a 107 break in the final frame. Kyren Wilson beat David Grace 5‍–‍4 with a 122 break in the deciding frame. Walden compiled three century breaks of 137, 131, and 135 to win 5‍–‍4 against Jamie Jones. Yuan Sijun defeated Ishpreet Singh Chadha 5‍–‍3, helped by breaks of 121, 141, and 95. The fourth seed and Players Championship winner Mark Allen lost 3‍–‍5 to Daniel Wells.

Brecel won five frames in a row from 0‍–‍2 behind to defeat Oliver Brown 5‍–‍2. Despite the 21st seed Zhou Yuelong making a 101 break in the fourth frame, Wu Yize won the match 5‍–‍1. The 12th and 13th seeds John Higgins and Zhang Anda lost to Jackson Page and Elliot Slessor respectively, at the same scoreline of 3‍–‍5. Lyu led Aaron Hill 2‍–‍0 with breaks of 94 and 67, but was trailing 2‍–‍4 after the sixth frame. However, Lyu took the next three frames to capture a 5‍–‍4 victory. Ronnie O'Sullivan made back‑to‑back centuries of 129 and 106 as he beat Michael White 5‍–‍3. Jordan Brown opened the match against Chris Wakelin with a break of 135, and went on to lead 3‍–‍0, but Wakelin took five of the next six frames to win 5‍–‍4. Wildcard player Wang Xinbo made a 135 break to lead He Guoqiang 4‍–‍3, but He won frames eight and seven for a 5‍–‍4 victory.

==== Last 32 ====
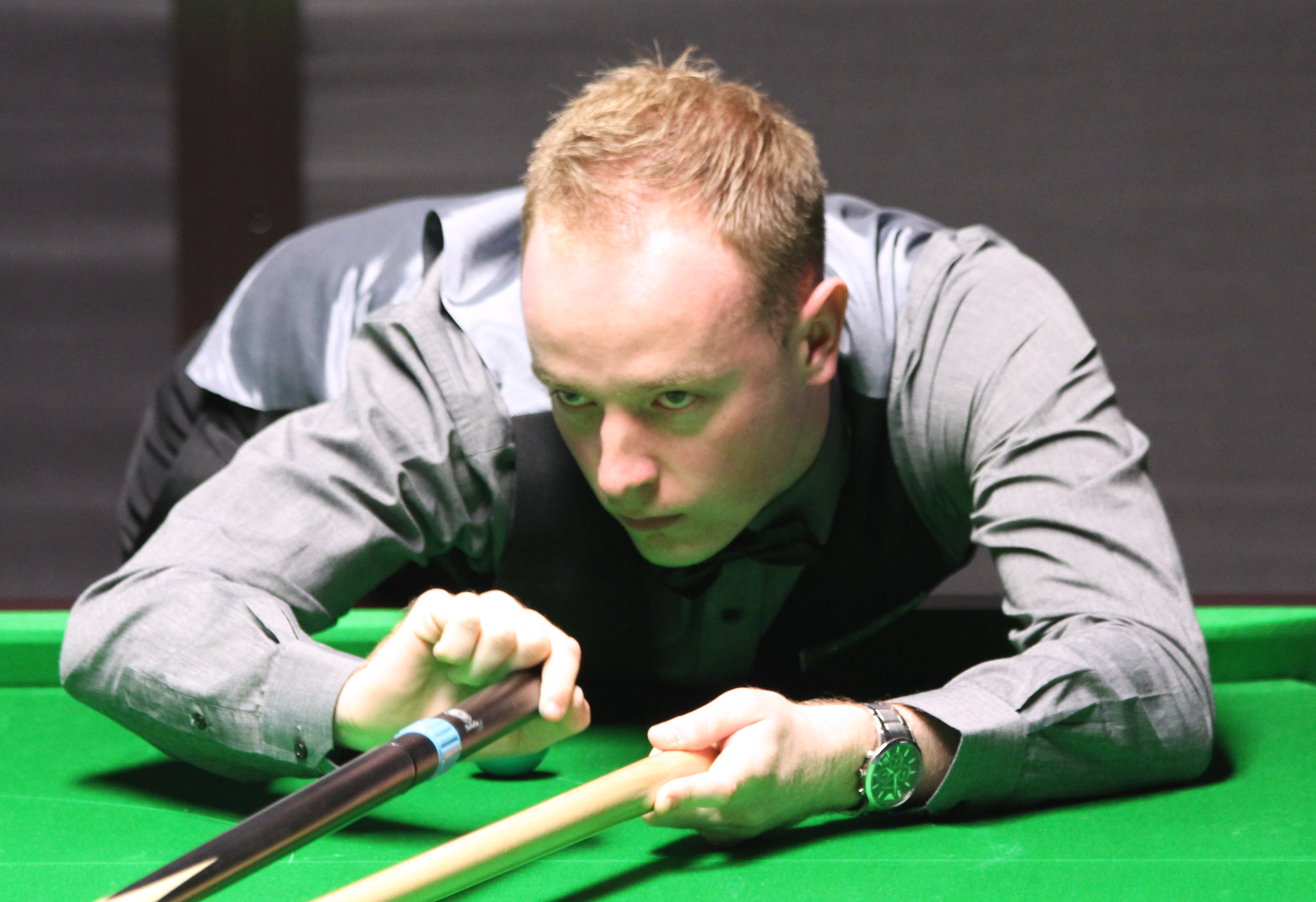
Chris Wakelin (pictured) compiled three century breaks to defeat the 10th seed Ali Carter 5‍–‍1.

The last-32 matches were played on 20 March as the best of nine frames. Ding made three centuries of 119, 110, and 100 as he beat fellow Chinese player Cao 5‍–‍1, and Stephen Maguire beat the reigning World Champion and second seed Brecel over the same scoreline. From 1‍–‍2 behind, Vafaei took four consecutive frames to defeat Robert Milkins 5‍–‍2. Murphy compiled three century breaks of 106, 136, and 104 during his 5‍–‍3 win over Perry. Barry Hawkins was level at 2‍–‍2 against Robbie Williams at the mid‑session interval, and went on to win the next three frames to capture a 5‍–‍3 victory, making a high break of 146 in the last frame. Ben Woollaston evened the score against Walden at 3‍–‍3 with a 107 break in the sixth frame, and Walden pulled ahead to 4‍–‍3 with a century break of his own, a 127. However, Woollaston narrowly won the eighth frame to force a deciding frame, which he took with a 60 break to win 5‍–‍4. Ronnie O'Sullivan defeated Lyu 5‍–‍2, making breaks of 99, 102, and 96. Despite making a 101 break in the fourth frame, the 10th seed Carter lost 1‍–‍5 to Wakelin, who made three century breaks of 103, 143, and 131 in the match. Selby made two 136 breaks to lead Long 3‍–‍0, and Long responded with back‑to‑back centuries of 112 and 103 to trail 2‍–‍3, but Selby won the next two frames for a 5‍–‍2 victory. Neil Robertson beat Yuan 5‍–‍3. From 0‍–‍3 behind against the defending champion Trump, Fan Zhengyi narrowed the score to 3‍–‍4, but Trump made a 108 break in the eighth frame to secure a 5‍–‍3 win.

==== Last 16 ====
The last-16 matches were played on 21 March as the best of nine frames. Maguire opened the match against Hawkins with a break of 95, but Hawkins responded with a 129 break and went on to take four more frames to win 5‍–‍1. Trump and Lilley each made a century break as they levelled the match at 2‍–‍2 at the mid‑session interval, and Trump won three of the next four frames for a 5‍–‍3 victory. Trailing Kyren Wilson 1‍–‍3, Woollaston won three of the four frames after the mid‑session interval to draw level at 4‍–‍4, but Wilson compiled a 119 break in the decider to secure the match 5‍–‍4. Vafaei and Ronnie O'Sullivan won alternating frames to leave the scores even at 3‍–‍3. Vafaei got within one frame of victory after winning frame seven, and O'Sullivan produced a total clearance of 125 to force a deciding frame. O'Sullivan's break off shot in the decider left a red to the middle pocket, which Vafaei potted, but he missed an easy red to end the break at 33. O'Sullivan countered with a break of 62 before running out of position, allowing Vafaei to clear the colours and win the match 5‍–‍4 on the last black. Vafaei described the missed red in the deciding frame as "unforgivable". He added: "I'm very happy to get the victory. He [O'Sullivan] is my hero. Just playing against Ronnie O'Sullivan is a dream come true, but what about winning?"

The match between Page and the fifth seed Selby produced four consecutive centuries in the first four frames, three by Page and one by Selby. They each made a 90+ break in the next two frames to leave Page leading 4‍–‍2. Selby had the first chance in the seventh frame but his break ended at 50, allowing Page to claim a 5‍–‍2 victory with a 74 break. Neil Robertson defeated Wakelin 5‍–‍1, making breaks of 140, 109, 61, 122, and 91. Breaks of 95, 130, and 83 from Ding and 101, 86, and 121 from Murphy saw the match level at 3‍–‍3, and Ding took the next two frames with 73 and 65 breaks to win the match 5‍–‍3. Slessor was level at 2‍–‍2 against Wells at the mid‑session interval, and made breaks of 87, 82 and 101 to take three frames in a row and secure a 5‍–‍2 victory.

=== Later rounds ===
==== Quarter-finals ====
The quarter-finals were played on 22 March as the best of nine frames. Page made breaks of 90 and 140 to lead Slessor 2‍–‍0, and Slessor won the next two frames to level the match at 2‍–‍2 at the mid‑session interval. However, Page took three consecutive frames with breaks of 78, 76, and 87 to win 5‍–‍2, reaching the first ranking semi‑final of his career. The match between defending champion Trump and 2017 runner‑up Kyren Wilson was also drawn at 2‍–‍2 at the mid‑session interval. After a re‑rack, Wilson took on a 58‍–‍1 lead in the fifth frame, and Trump narrowed the score to 39‍–‍58 after a long safety battle over the yellow, which he potted. Trump then fluked both the green and brown, and went on to win the frame on the last black. Trump extended his lead to 4‍–‍2 with a 59 break in the sixth frame. Wilson made a break of 60 in frame seven, but overcut a red, allowing Trump to capture the frame and a 5‍–‍2 victory. Commenting on his win, Trump said: "There seems to be players I have a good record against recently. Kyren [Wilson] is one of them. It always helps when you know what you have to do. You have to turn up and be solid against him. It makes my job easy knowing I have to go out and play well."

Winner of the 2017 event Ding made breaks of 73, 74, 135, and 102 to complete a 5‍–‍0 win over Vafaei. Two‑time champion Neil Robertson led Hawkins 3‍–‍1 at the mid‑session interval, helped by breaks of 127, 87, and 87. Robertson went on to make 115 and 79 breaks to claim a 5‍–‍2 victory. He said: "My game is absolutely back to where it should be now and that is really exciting heading into the back end of the season. It is a blockbuster match tomorrow [against Ding]. If you can't enjoy playing Ding in a semi‑final in China then there's something wrong."

==== Semi-finals ====
The semi-finals were played on 23 March as the best of 11 frames. The first semi‑final was played between Page, who had never progressed past the last‑16 stage of a ranking tournament prior to the event, and Trump, who was playing his 61st career ranking semi‑final. Before the match began, Page accidentally cut his finger while retrieving his cue from its case. He commented after the match: "I was praying for it not to bleed, but then it started bleeding. I tried putting a plaster on, but then I couldn't feel the cue so I had to take it off. It's not an ideal start in your first semi‑final." Trump won the opening frame with a century break of 122, and Page levelled the match to 2‍–‍2. However, Trump won four frames in a row after the mid‑session interval to claim a 6‍–‍2 victory and reach his seventh ranking final of the season. He said: "It was a scrappy game, neither of us played well, we both missed a lot of balls. It was Jackson's [Page's] first semi‑final and he didn't really settle, my experience probably made the difference."

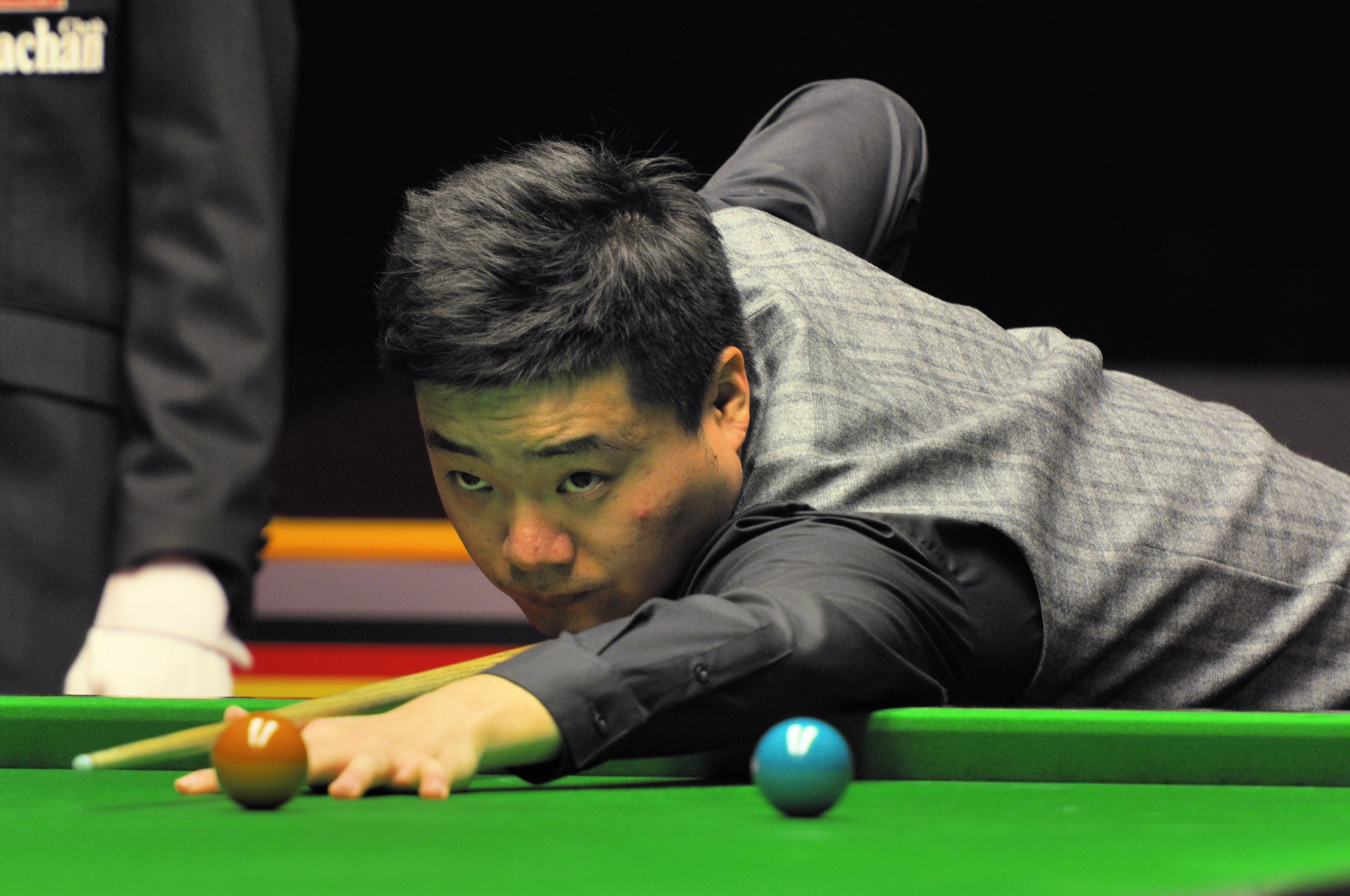
From 1‍–‍3 behind, 2017 winner Ding Junhui (pictured) beat Neil Robertson 6‍–‍5 on the last pink.

Ding and Neil Robertson contested the second semi‑final. Robertson established a 3‍–‍1 advantage at the mid‑session interval with a break of 118 in the fourth frame, but Ding claimed the next three frames to lead 4‍–‍3. Robertson regained the lead by winning frames eight and nine with breaks of 55 and 128. In the ninth frame, Robertson made a break of 36 before missing a red as he had to bridge over another ball, allowing Ding to even the match to 5‍–‍5 with a 68 break. Robertson had the first chance in the deciding frame, but had to play safe when he lost position on the next red after potting the pink, scoring 53. Ding then narrowed his deficit to 44‍–‍56, and capitalised on Robertson's safety error on the last red to secure a 6‍–‍5 victory on the last pink. Ding punched the table in celebration, as he had defeated Robertson for the first time since the 2014 China Open final, and reached the second ranking final of the season, after the 2023 UK Championship. Ding said: "I can't feel my legs, there was so much pressure on me. When I got the chance in the last frame, I thought I was going to win, but there was pressure on every shot. When I potted the pink I tried to enjoy the moment." The loss meant that Robertson's ranking has dropped out of the top 16, a position he had held since 2006. He also had to qualify for the World Championship for the first time since 2006. Robertson described the loss as "tough one to take", commenting on social media that he "played three brilliant frames [from 3‍–‍4 behind] but wasn't meant to be, just a centimetre out here or there on match ball and couldn't get through."

==== Final ====
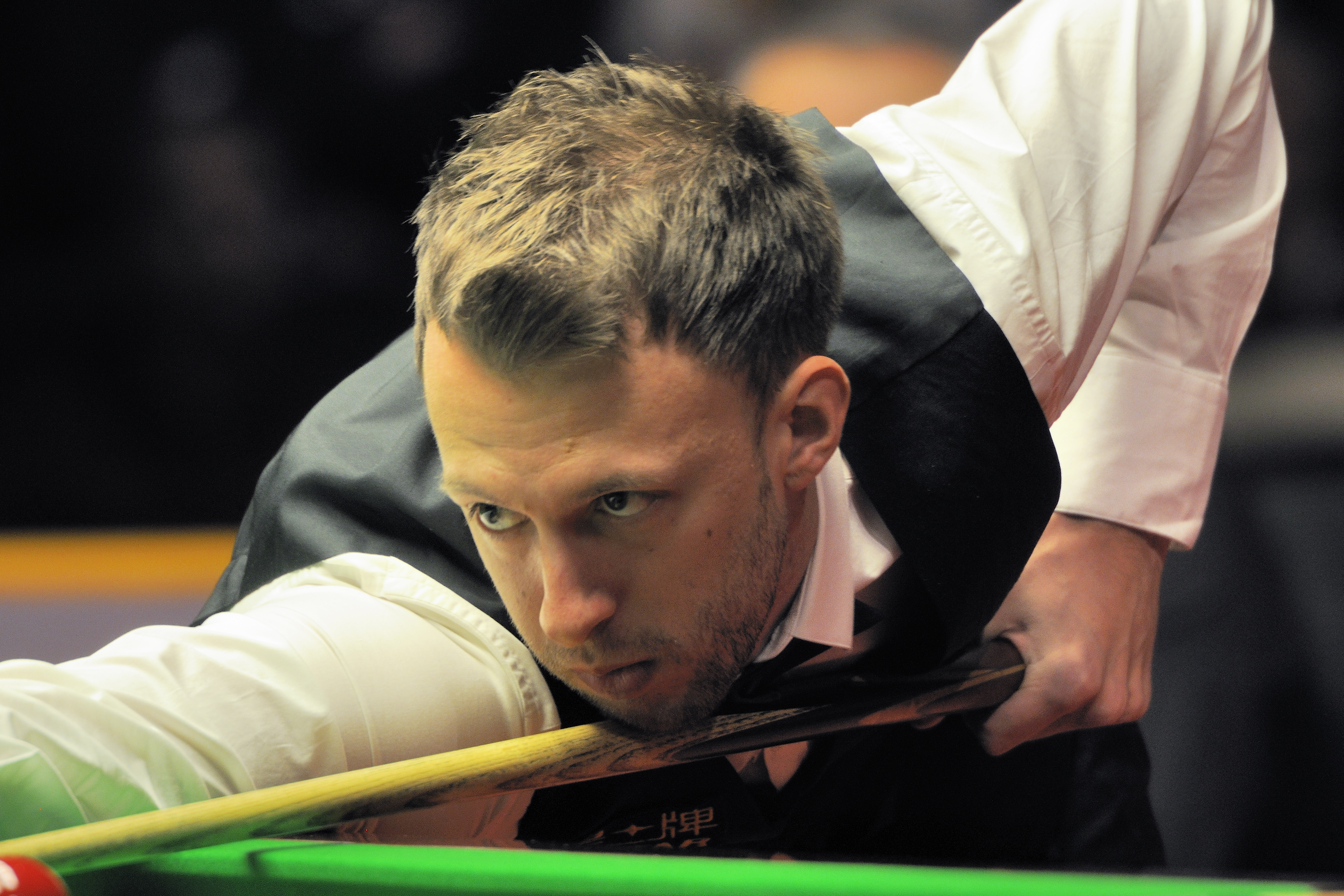
Judd Trump (pictured) successfully defended the title, winning 10‍–‍4 over Ding Junhui to claim his fifth ranking title of the season, the 28th in his career.

The final was a best-of-19-frames match, being played over two sessions on 24 March, officiated by Zhu Ying, between Trump and Ding. Trump was playing in his 44th career ranking final and seventh in the season, and Ding the 23rd in his career and second in the season. Trump won the two closely contested opening frames of the first session to lead 2‍–‍0, with both players making multiple errors. Ding's break off shot in the third frame left a red to the middle pocket, allowing Trump to take the frame with a 88 break. Ding narrowed the score to 1‍–‍3 at the mid‑session interval, but Trump won the next four frames, making breaks of 59, 79, and 78, to extend his lead to 7‍–‍1. Ding made the first century break of the match in the last frame of the session, a 106, to trail 2‍–‍7.

In the second session, Trump won the opening frame with a 130 break, and scored 35 in the 11th frame, but fouled when a red went into the pocket as the cue ball cannoned into the pack after he potted the blue, and Ding took the frame with a break of 84. Trump closed to one frame from victory at 9‍–‍3 with a 106 break in the 12th frame, and Ding won frame 13 to narrow the score to 9‍–‍4 at the mid‑session interval. When play resumed, Ding potted a difficult long red, but he missed the routine black in the following shot. Trump capitalised on the error to make a 58 break before missing a red to the corner pocket, and Ding narrowed the score to 52‍–‍58, helped by 16 foul points conceded by Trump from a snooker on the last red. Ding went in‑off from an attempted long red, allowing Trump to capture the frame and match 10‍–‍4, winning his second World Open and successfully defending the title.

It was Trump's fifth ranking title of the season, following his three consecutive wins at the 2023 English Open, the 2023 Wuhan Open, and the 2023 Northern Ireland Open, in addition to the 2024 German Masters. The win marked Trump's third time winning five or more ranking events in a single season, having previously done so in the 2019‍–‍20 and the 2020‍–‍21 seasons. The only other players that have achieved the feat were Stephen Hendry in 1990‍–‍94, Ding in 2013‍–‍14, Selby in 2016‍–‍17, and Ronnie O'Sullivan in 2017‍–‍18. It was also Trump's 28th career ranking title, matching the tally of Steve Davis. Trump said after the match: "Ding had been playing really well this week so I thought it was going to be tough. I managed to dig in during the afternoon and get a good lead, then played my best stuff of the tournament tonight. I didn't want to give Ding the chance to start winning frames and let the crowd get behind him." He added: "As I have got older I have learned not to punish myself when I miss easy balls. So much of snooker is in the head, if you can be in the right space mentally then you have a big advantage. I am a lot more consistent in that respect these days."

== Main draw ==
The draw for the tournament is shown below. Numbers in parentheses after the players' names denote the top 32 seeded players, and players in bold denote match winners. All matches were played as the best of nine frames until the semi-finals which were the best of 11, and the final was a best of 19 frames match played over two sessions.

=== Top half ===
**Last 64**; Best of 9 frames
**Judd Trump (ENG) (1)**	**5**
Sanderson Lam (ENG)	2
David Gilbert (ENG) (32) (Note: David Gilbert withdrew, and Fan Zhengyi received a walkover.)	w/d
**Fan Zhengyi (CHN)**	**w/o**
Lukas Kleckers (GER)	4
**Dominic Dale (WAL)**	**5**
Stuart Carrington (ENG)	4
**David Lilley (ENG)**	**5**
Jak Jones (WAL)	0
**Ashley Hugill (ENG)**	**5**
David Grace (ENG)	4
**Kyren Wilson (ENG) (9)**	**5**
Jamie Jones (WAL)	4
**Ricky Walden (ENG) (25)**	**5**
**Ben Woollaston (ENG)**	**w/o**
Iulian Boiko (UKR) (Note: Iulian Boiko replaced Mark Williams who withdrew, but Boiko also withdrew before the main stage of the tournament, due to conflicts with the Q Tour Global Playoff and EBSA European Championship. Ben Woollaston received a walkover.)	w/d
**Mark Selby (ENG) (5)**	**w/o**
Adam Duffy (ENG) (Note: Adam Duffy withdrew, and Mark Selby received a walkover.)	w/d
Si Jiahui (CHN) (28)	2
**Long Zehuang (CHN)**	**5**
John Higgins (SCO) (12)	3
**Jackson Page (WAL)**	**5**
Zhou Yuelong (CHN) (21)	1
**Wu Yize (CHN)**	**5**
**Matthew Stevens (WAL)**	**5**
Ryan Day (WAL) (20)	2
**Elliot Slessor (ENG)**	**5**
Zhang Anda (CHN) (13)	3
**He Guoqiang (CHN)**	**5**
Wang Xinbo (CHN)	4
**Daniel Wells (WAL)**	**5**
Mark Allen (NIR) (4)	3

**Last 32**; Best of 9 frames
**(England) Judd Trump**	**5**
(China) Fan Zhengyi	3
(Wales) Dominic Dale	2
**(England) David Lilley**	**5**
(England) Ashley Hugill	3
**(England) Kyren Wilson**	**5**
(England) Ricky Walden	4
**(England) Ben Woollaston**	**5**
**(England) Mark Selby**	**5**
(China) Long Zehuang	2
**(Wales) Jackson Page**	**5**
(China) Wu Yize	3
(Wales) Matthew Stevens	1
**(England) Elliot Slessor**	**5**
(China) He Guoqiang	3
**(Wales) Daniel Wells**	**5**

**Last 16**; Best of 9 frames
**(England) Judd Trump**	**5**
(England) David Lilley	3
**(England) Kyren Wilson**	**5**
(England) Ben Woollaston	4
(England) Mark Selby	2
**(Wales) Jackson Page**	**5**
**(England) Elliot Slessor**	**5**
(Wales) Daniel Wells	2

**Quarter-finals**; Best of 9 frames
**(England) Judd Trump**	**5**
(England) Kyren Wilson	2
**(Wales) Jackson Page**	**5**
(England) Elliot Slessor	2

**Semi-finals**; Best of 11 frames
**(England) Judd Trump**	**6**
(Wales) Jackson Page	2

Note: w/o = walkover; w/d = withdrawn

=== Bottom half ===
**Last 64**; Best of 9 frames
**Ronnie O'Sullivan (ENG) (3)**	**5**
Michael White (WAL)	3
**Lyu Haotian (CHN) (30)**	**5**
Aaron Hill (IRL)	4
**Robert Milkins (ENG) (14)**	**w/o**
Sam Craigie (ENG) (Note: Sam Craigie withdrew due to injury, and Robert Milkins received a walkover.)	w/d
**Hossein Vafaei (IRN) (19)**	**5**
Graeme Dott (SCO)	1
**Cao Yupeng (CHN)**	**5**
Noppon Saengkham (THA) (22)	3
Liu Hongyu (CHN)	2
**Ding Junhui (CHN) (11)**	**5**
Sean O'Sullivan (ENG)	1
**Joe Perry (ENG) (27)**	**5**
Xu Si (CHN)	3
**Shaun Murphy (ENG) (6)**	**5**
**Neil Robertson (AUS) (7)**	**5**
Tian Pengfei (CHN)	3
Ishpreet Singh Chadha (IND)	3
**Yuan Sijun (CHN)**	**5**
**Ali Carter (ENG) (10)**	**5**
Louis Heathcote (ENG)	3
**Chris Wakelin (ENG) (23)**	**5**
Jordan Brown (NIR)	4
**Robbie Williams (ENG)**	**5**
Tom Ford (ENG) (18)	4
Jenson Kendrick (ENG)	2
**Barry Hawkins (ENG) (15)**	**5**
**Stephen Maguire (SCO)**	**5**
Pang Junxu (CHN) (31)	3
Oliver Brown (ENG)	2
**Luca Brecel (BEL) (2)**	**5**

**Last 32**; Best of 9 frames
**(England) Ronnie O'Sullivan**	**5**
(China) Lyu Haotian	2
(England) Robert Milkins	2
**(Iran) Hossein Vafaei**	**5**
(China) Cao Yupeng	1
**(China) Ding Junhui**	**5**
(England) Joe Perry	3
**(England) Shaun Murphy**	**5**
**(Australia) Neil Robertson**	**5**
(China) Yuan Sijun	2
(England) Ali Carter	1
**(England) Chris Wakelin**	**5**
(England) Robbie Williams	2
**(England) Barry Hawkins**	**5**
**(Scotland) Stephen Maguire**	**5**
(Belgium) Luca Brecel	1

**Last 16**; Best of 9 frames
(England) Ronnie O'Sullivan	4
**(Iran) Hossein Vafaei**	**5**
**(China) Ding Junhui**	**5**
(England) Shaun Murphy	3
**(Australia) Neil Robertson**	**5**
(England) Chris Wakelin	1
**(England) Barry Hawkins**	**5**
(Scotland) Stephen Maguire	1

**Quarter-finals**; Best of 9 frames
(Iran) Hossein Vafaei	0
**(China) Ding Junhui**	**5**
**(Australia) Neil Robertson**	**5**
(England) Barry Hawkins	2

**Semi-finals**; Best of 11 frames
**(China) Ding Junhui**	**6**
(Australia) Neil Robertson	5

Note: w/o = walkover; w/d = withdrawn

=== Final ===
Final: Best of 19 frames. Referee: Zhu Ying; Yushan Sport Centre, Yushan, China, 24 March 2024
**Judd Trump** (1); England	**10**–4	Ding Junhui (11); China
Afternoon: **87**‍–‍40, **64**‍–‍20, **88**‍–‍0, 1‍–‍**64**, **70**‍–‍56, **61**‍–‍12, **89**‍–‍4, **78**‍–‍16, 0‍–‍**106** (106); Evening: **130**‍–‍0 (130), 35‍–‍**89**, **106**‍–‍0 (106), 23‍–‍**60**, **85**‍–‍57
(frame 10) **130**	Highest break	106 (frame 9)
**2**	Century breaks	1

== Qualifying ==
Qualification for the tournament took place from 22 to 24 January at the Barnsley Metrodome in Barnsley, England. Although matches involving defending champion Judd Trump, reigning World Champion Luca Brecel, the two highest-ranked Chinese players Ding Junhui and Zhang Anda, and four Chinese wildcards (Wang Xinbo, Wang Xinzhong, Gong Chenzhi, and Lan Yuhao) were held over to be played at the final venue. Numbers in parentheses after the players' names denote the top 32 seeded players, and players in bold denote match winners.

=== Yushan ===
The results of the held-over matches played in Yushan on 18 March were as follows:

- **Wang Xinbo** (CHN) **5**–1 Wang Xinzhong (CHN) (Note: Pre-qualifying match played on 18 March between two of the Chinese wildcards (Wang Xinbo and Wang Xinzhong) to determine who would face Matthew Selt later that day.)
- **Luca Brecel** (BEL) (2) **5**–1 Manasawin Phetmalaikul (THA)
- **Jordan Brown** (NIR) **5**–1 Lan Yuhao (CHN)
- **Sanderson Lam** (ENG) **5**–4 Gong Chenzhi (CHN)
- **Judd Trump** (ENG) (1) **5**–2 Rory Thor (MAS)
- **Zhang Anda** (CHN) (13) **5**–3 Allan Taylor (ENG)
- **Ding Junhui** (CHN) (11) **5**–3 Zak Surety (ENG)
- Matthew Selt (ENG) (29) 4–**5** **Wang Xinbo** (CHN)

=== Barnsley ===
The results of the qualifying matches played in Barnsley were as follows:

==== 22 January ====
- **Fan Zhengyi** (CHN) **5**–2 Dylan Emery (WAL)
- **Dominic Dale** (WAL) **5**–3 Marco Fu (HKG)
- **Ricky Walden** (ENG) (25) **5**–0 Peng Yisong (CHN)
- Baipat Siripaporn (THA) 1–**5** **Iulian Boiko** (UKR)
- **Zhou Yuelong** (CHN) (21) **5**–1 Jiang Jun (CHN)
- Jamie Clarke (WAL) 1–**5** **Liu Hongyu** (CHN)
- **Tian Pengfei** (CHN) **5**–1 Mink Nutcharut (THA)
- **David Grace** (ENG) **5**–2 Rebecca Kenna (ENG)
- **Mark Selby** (ENG) (5) **5**–3 Xing Zihao (CHN)
- **Matthew Stevens** (WAL) **5**–3 Hammad Miah (ENG)
- **Ryan Day** (WAL) (20) **5**–4 Andrew Higginson (ENG)
- Joe O'Connor (ENG) 4–**5** **Aaron Hill** (IRL)
- **Yuan Sijun** (CHN) **5**–3 Alexander Ursenbacher (SUI)
- **Pang Junxu** (CHN) (31) **5**–2 James Cahill (ENG)
- **David Gilbert** (ENG) (32) **5**–0 Anton Kazakov (UKR)
- **Jamie Jones** (WAL) **5**–0 Rod Lawler (ENG)
- **Joe Perry** (ENG) (27) **5**–4 Martin O'Donnell (ENG)
- **Neil Robertson** (AUS) (7) **5**–0 Victor Sarkis (BRA)
- **Chris Wakelin** (ENG) (23) **5**–2 Andy Hicks (ENG)
- **Robbie Williams** (ENG) **5**–3 Andy Lee (HKG)
- Anthony Hamilton (ENG) 3–**5** **Jenson Kendrick** (ENG)

==== 23 January ====
- Gary Wilson (ENG) (17) 4–**5** **Stuart Carrington** (ENG)
- **Kyren Wilson** (ENG) (9) **5**–0 Jimmy White (ENG)
- **Si Jiahui** (CHN) (28) **5**–1 Stan Moody (ENG)
- **Jackson Page** (WAL) **5**–3 Liam Graham (SCO)
- **Lyu Haotian** (CHN) (30) **5**–2 Ashley Carty (ENG)
- Xiao Guodong (CHN) 1–**5** **Sean O'Sullivan** (ENG)
- **Ali Carter** (ENG) (10) **5**–1 Ahmed Aly Elsayed (USA)
- **Jak Jones** (WAL) **5**–3 Ryan Thomerson (AUS)
- **Elliot Slessor** (ENG) **5**–2 Reanne Evans (ENG)
- **Robert Milkins** (ENG) (14) **5**–2 Barry Pinches (ENG) (Note: Barry Pinches replaced Muhammad Asif who withdrew.)
- **Sam Craigie** (ENG) **5**–0 Ken Doherty (IRL)
- **Hossein Vafaei** (IRN) (19) **5**–2 Liam Pullen (ENG)
- **Noppon Saengkham** (THA) (22) **5**–4 Himanshu Jain (IND)
- **Shaun Murphy** (ENG) (6) **5**–0 Mohamed Ibrahim (EGY)
- Liam Highfield (ENG) 1–**5** **Daniel Wells** (WAL)
- **Ronnie O'Sullivan** (ENG) (3) **5**–3 Alfie Burden (ENG)
- **Michael White** (WAL) **5**–2 Haydon Pinhey (ENG) (Note: Haydon Pinhey replaced Stephen Hendry who withdrew.)
- Oliver Lines (ENG) 0–**5** **Louis Heathcote** (ENG)
- **Tom Ford** (ENG) (18) **5**–2 Ma Hailong (CHN)
- **Barry Hawkins** (ENG) (15) **5**–3 Steven Hallworth (ENG) (Note: Steven Hallworth replaced Dean Young who withdrew.)
- Mark Joyce (ENG) 4–**5** **Oliver Brown** (ENG)

==== 24 January ====
- **Ben Woollaston** (ENG) **5**–4 Ben Mertens (BEL)
- Mark Davis (ENG) 4–**5** **Adam Duffy** (ENG)
- Thepchaiya Un-Nooh (THA) 4–**5** **Long Zehuang** (CHN)
- **Wu Yize** (CHN) **5**–2 Julien Leclercq (BEL)
- Jimmy Robertson (ENG) 2–**5** **He Guoqiang** (CHN)
- **Cao Yupeng** (CHN) **5**–0 Rory McLeod (JAM) (Note: Rory McLeod replaced John Astley who withdrew.)
- **Xu Si** (CHN) **5**–0 Andrew Pagett (WAL)
- Stuart Bingham (ENG) (26) 3–**5** **Ishpreet Singh Chadha** (IND)
- Jack Lisowski (ENG) (16) 2–**5** **Lukas Kleckers** (GER)
- Scott Donaldson (SCO) 3–**5** **David Lilley** (ENG)
- Anthony McGill (SCO) (24) 1–**5** **Ashley Hugill** (ENG)
- **John Higgins** (SCO) (12) **5**–1 Ross Muir (SCO)
- **Mark Allen** (NIR) (4) **5**–1 Andres Petrov (EST)
- **Graeme Dott** (SCO) **5**–2 Ian Burns (ENG)
- **Stephen Maguire** (SCO) **5**–1 Mostafa Dorgham (EGY)

== Century breaks ==
=== Main stage centuries ===
A total of 95 century breaks were made during the main stage of the tournament in Yushan.

- 147 – Zak Surety
- 146, 129 – Barry Hawkins
- 143, 131, 103 – Chris Wakelin
- 141, 121 – Yuan Sijun
- 140, 136, 130, 120, 102, 100 – Jackson Page
- 140, 128, 127, 122, 118, 115, 109, 109 – Neil Robertson
- 139, 101, 100 – Elliot Slessor
- 137, 135, 131, 127 – Ricky Walden
- 136, 136, 129 – Mark Selby
- 136, 121, 106, 104, 101 – Shaun Murphy
- 136 – Jordan Brown
- 135, 130, 130, 122, 109, 108, 108, 106 – Judd Trump
- 135, 130, 123, 122, 119, 110, 106, 102, 100 – Ding Junhui
- 135, 118 – Wang Xinbo
- 135, 114, 101 – Ali Carter
- 133 – Wu Yize
- 132, 120 – He Guoqiang
- 131, 100 – Luca Brecel
- 129, 125, 106, 102 – Ronnie O'Sullivan
- 128, 122, 119, 114, 108, 104 – Kyren Wilson
- 124, 105 – David Lilley
- 121, 111 – Daniel Wells
- 117 – Matthew Selt
- 114, 108 – Tom Ford
- 112, 107, 103 – Long Zehuang
- 110 – Louis Heathcote
- 110 – Robbie Williams
- 107, 105 – Ben Woollaston
- 107 – Lukas Kleckers
- 103 – Mark Allen
- 102 – Dominic Dale
- 102 – Allan Taylor
- 101 – Zhou Yuelong
- 100 – Cao Yupeng

=== Qualifying stage centuries ===
A total of 34 century breaks were made during the qualifying stage of the tournament in Barnsley.

- 139 – Marco Fu
- 137, 106, 101 – Lyu Haotian
- 133, 114 – Louis Heathcote
- 133 – David Gilbert
- 133 – Lukas Kleckers
- 133 – Matthew Stevens
- 133 – Ben Woollaston
- 131 – Tom Ford
- 130, 101 – Mark Selby
- 128 – Elliot Slessor
- 127, 112 – Shaun Murphy
- 127 – Wu Yize
- 124 – Joe O'Connor
- 123 – Yuan Sijun
- 121, 114, 113 – Kyren Wilson
- 121 – Neil Robertson
- 109 – Chris Wakelin
- 107 – Fan Zhengyi
- 107 – Xiao Guodong
- 104 – Alfie Burden
- 104 – Cao Yupeng
- 102 – Tian Pengfei
- 101 – Martin O'Donnell
- 101 – Ricky Walden
- 100 – Mark Allen
- 100 – Stuart Bingham
- 100 – Barry Hawkins
