= 2026 Snooker Shoot Out =

Snooker tournament

2026 TAOM Shoot Out

Tournament information
- Dates: 9–12 December 2026
- Venue: Tower Circus
- City: Blackpool
- Country: England
- Organisation: World Snooker Tour
- Format: Ranking event
- Total prize fund: £213,000
- Winner's share: £50,000
- Defending champion: Alfie Burden (ENG)

The 2026 Snooker Shoot Out (officially the 2026 TAOM Shoot Out) is an upcoming professional snooker tournament that will take place from 9 to 12 December 2026 at the Tower Circus in Blackpool, England. The 17th consecutive edition of the tournament since it was revived in 2011, it is the 10th ranking event of the 2026‍–‍27 season, following the 2026 UK Championship and preceding the 2026 Scottish Open.

The tournament is played under a variation of the standard rules of snooker, with each match contested over a single frame, lasting a maximum of 10 minutes. Alfie Burden is the defending champion, having defeated Stuart Bingham 63–8 in the 2025 final.

== Overview ==
The tournament is the eighteenth edition of the Snooker Shoot Out, first held as a non‑ranking event in 1990 before being revived in 2011 and since then having been held annually. It was promoted to a ranking event starting with the 2017 edition. The 2026 tournament is sponsored by chalk manufacturer TAOM.

=== Format ===
The tournament will be played using a variation of the traditional snooker rules, and the draw for each round will be randomised. All matches are played over a single frame, each of which lasts up to 10 minutes. The event features a variable shot clock; players are allowed 15 seconds per shot during the first five minutes and 10 seconds per shot during the final five minutes. The player with the most points after the time runs out or after all balls have been pocketed (or after a foul on the final black) will win the match. All foul shots result in the opponent receiving a ball-in-hand. Unlike traditional snooker, a foul is called if a ball did not either hit a cushion or enter a pocket on every shot. Rather than a coin toss, a lag is used to determine which player breaks off. In the event of a draw, the frame is decided by a "blue ball shootout". With the cue ball placed inside the "D" and the blue ball on its spot, the players will alternate shots until one player has potted the blue more times than their opponent from an equal number of attempts.

=== Amateur nominations ===
The World Professional Billiards and Snooker Association has nominated eight amateur players to participate in the tournament, alongside other amateurs and professionals:

- Vladislav Gradinari (MLD)
- Steven Wardropper (SCO)
- Riley Powell (WAL)
- Kaylan Patel (ENG)
- Shaun Liu (HKG)
- Darragh Gallagher (NIR)
- Dermot Kelly (IRL)
- Edward Jones (ENG)

=== Prize fund ===
The prize fund for the tournament is shown below. While the winners' cheque is still £50,000, the overall prize fund in the tournament has increased £42,000 from previous years:

- Winner: £50,000
- Runner-up: £22,000
- Semi-final: £12,000
- Quarter-final: £6,000
- Last 16: £3,000
- Last 32: £1,500
- Last 64: £750
- Last 128: £250 (Players losing in the first round do not gain any ranking points)
- Highest break: £5,000
- Total: £213,000

== Tournament draw ==
All times in Greenwich Mean Time. Times for quarter‑finals, semi‑finals and final are approximate. Players in bold denote match winners and an (a) denotes amateur players not currently on the World Snooker Tour. Match results as follows:

=== Round 1 ===
==== 9 December – 13:00 ====
- Alfie Burden (ENG) – Fergal Quinn (NIR)
- Mark Allen (NIR) – Robert Milkins (ENG) (a)
- Michael Larkov (UKR) – Mahmoud El Hareedy (EGY)
- Liam Pullen (ENG) – Ng On-yee (HKG)
- Steven Wardropper (SCO) (a) – Riley Powell (WAL) (a)
- Sean O'Sullivan (ENG) – Gong Chenzhi (CHN)
- Matthew Stevens (WAL) – Zhang Anda (CHN)
- Joe O'Connor (ENG) – Chang Bingyu (CHN)
- Hossein Vafaei (IRN) – Mitchell Mann (ENG)
- Jamie Clarke (WAL) – Deng Haohui (CHN)
- Edward Jones (ENG) (a) – Vladislav Gradinari (MDA) (a)
- Phil O'Kane (ENG) – Michał Szubarczyk (POL)
- Daniel Wells (WAL) – Shaun Liu (HKG) (a)
- Louis Heathcote (ENG) – Lan Yuhao (CHN)
- Jiang Jun (CHN) – Luca Brecel (BEL)
- Oliver Sykes (ENG) – Shaun Murphy (ENG)

==== 9 December – 19:00 ====
- Bai Yulu (CHN) – Wu Yize (CHN)
- Ross Muir (SCO) – Oliver Lines (ENG)
- Ben Woollaston (ENG) – David Lilley (ENG)
- Jack Bradford (WAL) (a) – Connor Benzey (ENG)
- Liam Davies (WAL) – Xu Yichen (CHN)
- Paul Norris (ENG) – Florian Nüßle (AUT)
- Elliot Slessor (ENG) – Jimmy Robertson (ENG)
- Stuart Bingham (ENG) – David Gilbert (ENG)
- Craig Steadman (ENG) – Gao Yang (CHN)
- Luo Zetao (CHN) – Ben Mertens (BEL)
- Mark Joyce (ENG) (a) – Ian Burns (ENG)
- Xiao Guodong (CHN) – Ricky Walden (ENG)
- David Grace (ENG) – Stuart Carrington (ENG)
- Duane Jones (WAL) (a) – Zhao Hanyang (CHN)
- Aaron Hill (IRL) – Mateusz Baranowski (POL)
- Allan Taylor (ENG) (a) – Jimmy White (ENG)

==== 10 December – 13:00 ====
- Jack Lisowski (ENG) – Michael Holt (ENG)
- He Guoqiang (CHN) – Liu Hongyu (CHN)
- Dermot Kelly (IRL) (a) – Dylan Emery (WAL)
- Reanne Evans (ENG) – Matthew Selt (ENG)
- Huang Jiahao (CHN) – Steven Hallworth (ENG)
- Jordan Brown (NIR) **w/o**–w/d Liu Wenwei (CHN) (Note: Liu Wenwei was suspended by the WPBSA and was therefore withdrawn automatically. Jordan Brown was given a walkover.)
- Liam Highfield (ENG) – Hammad Miah (ENG)
- Andrew Higginson (ENG) – Thepchaiya Un-Nooh (THA)
- Noppon Saengkham (THA) – Xu Si (CHN)
- Yuan Sijun (CHN) – Zak Surety (ENG)
- Cheung Ka Wai (HKG) – Yao Pengcheng (CHN)
- Darragh Gallagher (NIR) (a) – Daniel Womersley (ENG) (a)
- Long Zehuang (CHN) – Dean Young (SCO) (a)
- Patrick Whelan (ENG) (a) – Si Jiahui (CHN)
- Stan Moody (ENG) – Mina Awad (EGY)
- Ali Carter (ENG) – Zhou Yuelong (CHN)

Note: w/d=withdrawn; w/o=walkover

==== 10 December – 19:00 ====
- Chris Wakelin (ENG) – Martin O'Donnell (ENG)
- Alexander Ursenbacher (SUI) – Jackson Page (WAL)
- Joshua Thomond (ENG) (a) – Kaylan Patel (ENG) (a)
- Ishpreet Singh Chadha (IND) – Lyu Haotian (CHN)
- Anton Kazakov (UKR) – Chatchapong Nasa (THA)
- Sahil Nayyar (CAN) – Leone Crowley (IRL)
- Fan Zhengyi (CHN) – Gary Wilson (ENG)
- Oliver Brown (ENG) – Iulian Boiko (UKR)
- Tom Ford (ENG) – Antoni Kowalski (POL)
- Ashley Hugill (ENG) – Thanawat Tirapongpaiboon (THA)
- Julien Leclercq (BEL) – Jamie Jones (WAL)
- Liam Graham (SCO) – Sam Craigie (ENG)
- Pang Junxu (CHN) – Mark Williams (WAL)
- Ashley Carty (ENG) – Ryan Day (WAL)
- Wang Xinbo (CHN) – Lei Peifan (CHN)
- Zhao Xintong (CHN) – Liu Yang (CHN)
