= 2026 UK Championship =

Snooker tournament

2026 Leasing Options UK Championship
- Part of the snooker Triple Crown

Tournament information
- Dates: 28 November – 6 December 2026
- Venue: York Barbican
- City: York
- Country: England
- Organisation: World Snooker Tour
- Format: Ranking event
- Total prize fund: £1,500,000
- Winner's share: £312,500
- Defending champion: Mark Selby (ENG)

The 2026 UK Championship (officially the 2026 Leasing Options UK Championship) is an upcoming professional snooker tournament that will take place from 28 November to 6 December 2026 at the York Barbican in York, England. The qualifying rounds are taking place from 21 to 26 November at the Leicester Arena in Leicester, England. The 50th consecutive edition of the UK Championship since it was first staged in 1977, it will be the ninth ranking event of the 2026–27 snooker season, following the 2026 International Championship and preceding the 2026 Snooker Shoot Out. It will be the first of the season's three Triple Crown events, preceding the 2027 Masters and the 2027 World Snooker Championship. The winner will receive £312,500 from a total prize fund of £1,500,000.

Mark Selby is the defending champion, having defeated Judd Trump 10–8 in the 2025 final.

== Overview ==
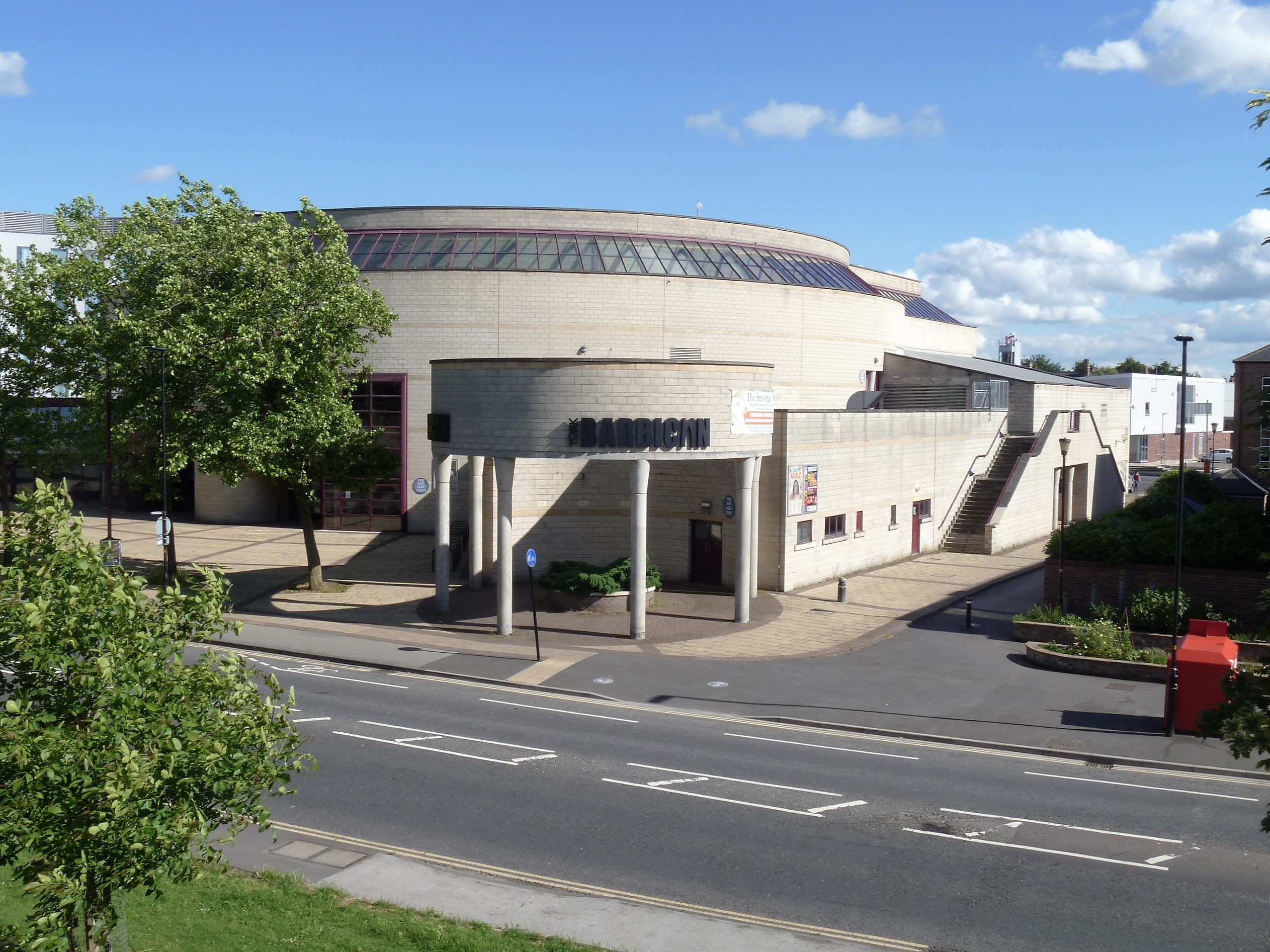
The main stage of the tournament will be played at the York Barbican (pictured in 2016) in York, England.

The UK Championship was first held in 1977 as the United Kingdom Professional Snooker Championship, staged at Blackpool Tower Circus in Blackpool, England. The inaugural event was won by Patsy Fagan, who defeated Doug Mountjoy 12–9 in the final. Joe Davis, who had won the World Snooker Championship 15 times between 1927 and 1946, presented Fagan with the trophy. For the tournament's first seven years, only United Kingdom residents or passport holders were eligible to compete. At the 1984 event, the UK Championship became a ranking tournament open to players of any nationality. As of the 2025 edition, Ronnie O'Sullivan is the most successful player in the tournament's history, having won the title eight times.

The 2026 edition of the tournament—its 50th consecutive staging since the inaugural edition in 1977—will take place from 28 November to 6 December at the York Barbican in York, England. The qualifying rounds are taking place from 21 to 26 November at the Leicester Arena in Leicester, England. Sponsored by car leasing company Leasing Options, it will be the ninth ranking event of the 2026–27 snooker season, following the 2026 International Championship and preceding the 2026 Snooker Shoot Out. It will be the first of the season's three Triple Crown events, preceding the 2027 Masters and the 2027 World Snooker Championship. Mark Selby is the defending champion, having defeated Judd Trump 10–8 in the 2025 final.

=== Prize fund ===
The winner of the event will receive £312,500 from a total prize fund of £1,500,000.

- Winner: £312,500
- Runner-up: £125,000
- Semi-finalists: £62,500
- Quarter-finalists: £31,250
- Last 16: £18,750
- Last 32: £12,500
- Last 48: £9,375
- Last 80: £6,250
- Last 112: £3,125
- Highest break: £15,000

== Summary ==
=== Qualifying rounds ===
==== Round one ====
Amateur player Riley Powell defeated Jamie Clarke 6–4, and Alfie Burden made a 140 century break in his 6–3 win over Mahmoud El Hareedy.

Jimmy White, aged 64, continued his recent good run by beating Brian Ochoiski 6–1, and Sanderson Lam whitewashed Florian Nüßle.

== Main draw ==
The results of the main draw are shown below. Numbers in the column to the left of the players' names denote the players' seeding and players in bold denote match winners.

**Last 32**; Best of 11 frames
1	Mark Selby (ENG)
16	Chang Bingyu (CHN)
9	Mark Williams (WAL)
8	Kyren Wilson (ENG)
5	Judd Trump (ENG)
12	Chris Wakelin (ENG)
13	Ronnie O'Sullivan (ENG)
4	Neil Robertson (AUS)
3	Zhao Xintong (CHN)
14	Xiao Guodong (CHN)
11	Mark Allen (NIR)
6	John Higgins (SCO)
7	Shaun Murphy (ENG)
10	Barry Hawkins (ENG)
15	Ali Carter (ENG)
2	Wu Yize (CHN)

**Last 16**; Best of 11 frames

**Quarter-finals**; Best of 11 frames

**Semi-finals**; Best of 11 frames

**Final**; Best of 19 frames

== Qualifying ==
The results of the qualifying draw are shown below. Numbers in parentheses after the players' names denote the players' seeding, an "a" indicates amateur players who were not on the main World Snooker Tour, and players in bold denote match winners.

**Round 1 (Last 144)**; Best of 11 frames
Michal Szubarczyk (POL) (81)	2
**Joshua Thomond (ENG) (a)**	**6**
Andrew Higginson (ENG) (112)	5
**Farakh Ajaib (PAK) (a)**	**6**
**Gong Chenzhi (CHN) (96)**	**6**
Paul Norris (ENG) (126)	2
**Huang Jiahao (CHN) (97)**	**6**
Panchaya Channoi (THA) (127)	3
Connor Benzey (ENG) (104)	4
**Craig Steadman (ENG) (122)**	**6**
**Leone Crowley (IRL) (89)**	**6**
Sean O'Sullivan (ENG) (121)	2
**Antoni Kowalski (POL) (105)**	**6**
Ryan Davies (ENG) (a)	3
**Artemijs Žižins (LVA) (88)**	**6**
Liu Yang (CHN) (119)	1
**Zhao Hanyang (CHN) (85)**	**6**
Ng On-yee (HKG) (117)	4
**Ashley Hugill (ENG) (108)**	**6**
Aaron Busuttil (MLT) (a)	4
**Ashley Carty (ENG) (92)**	**6**
Bai Yulu (CHN) (124)	4
**Chatchapong Nasa (THA) (101)**	**6**
Dean Young (SCO) (a)	1
**Cheung Ka Wai (HKG) (100)**	**6**
Michael Larkov (UKR) (125)	2
Jamie Clarke (WAL) (93)	4
**Riley Powell (WAL) (a)**	**6**
**Alfie Burden (ENG) (109)**	**6**
Mahmoud El Hareedy (EGY) (114)	3
Mateusz Baranowski (POL) (84)	3
**Stuart Carrington (ENG) (116)**	**6**
**Xu Yichen (CHN) (83)**	**6**
Edward Jones (ENG) (a)	3
Sahil Nayyar (CAN) (110)	1
**Mark Joyce (ENG) (a)**	**6**
Florian Nüßle (AUT) (94)	0
**Sanderson Lam (ENG) (a)**	**6**
**Jimmy White (ENG) (99)**	**6**
Brian Ochoiski (FRA) (a)	1
Oliver Brown (ENG) (102)	1
**Anton Kazakov (UKR) (113)**	**6**
**Liam Graham (SCO) (91)**	**6**
Mark Lloyd (ENG) (a)	2
**Oliver Sykes (ENG) (107)**	**6**
Peter Lines (ENG) (a)	2
Liu Wenwei (CHN) (86) (Note: Liu Wenwei was suspended by the WPBSA and was therefore withdrawn automatically. Mina Awad was given a walkover.)	w/d
**Mina Awad** (EGY) (123)	**w/o**
**Reanne Evans (ENG) (87)**	**6**
Daniel Boyes (ENG) (a)	4
**Alexander Ursenbacher (SUI) (106)**	**6**
Vladislav Gradinari (MDA) (a)	3
Mitchell Mann (ENG) (90)	5
**Deng Haohui (CHN) (115)**	**6**
**Luo Zetao (CHN) (103)**	**6**
Sebastian Milewski (POL) (a)	5
**Julien Leclercq (BEL) (98)**	**6**
Phil O'Kane (ENG) (120)	3
**T. Tirapongpaiboon (THA) (95)**	**6**
Paul Deaville (ENG) (a)	5
**Fergal Quinn (NIR) (111)**	**6**
Krzysztof Czapnik (POL) (a)	0
**Wang Xinbo (CHN) (82)**	**6**
Hammad Miah (ENG) (118)	5

**Round 2 (Last 112)**; Best of 11 frames
Lan Yuhao (CHN) (80)	3
**Joshua Thomond (ENG) (a)**	**6**
**He Guoqiang (CHN) (49)**	**6**
Farakh Ajaib (PAK) (a)	2
Marco Fu (HKG) (65)	2
**Gong Chenzhi (CHN) (96)**	**6**
**Jamie Jones (WAL) (64)**	**6**
Huang Jiahao (CHN) (97)	3
**Martin O'Donnell (ENG) (57)**	**6**
Craig Steadman (ENG) (122)	3
**Iulian Boiko (UKR) (72)**	**6**
Leone Crowley (IRL) (89)	0
**Long Zehuang (CHN) (56)**	**6**
Antoni Kowalski (POL) (105)	4
David Grace (ENG) (73)	2
**Artemijs Žižins (LVA) (88)**	**6**
**Yao Pengcheng (CHN) (76)**	**6**
Zhao Hanyang (CHN) (85)	2
**Liu Hongyu (CHN) (53)**	**6**
Ashley Hugill (ENG) (108)	1
**Lyu Haotian (CHN) (69)**	**6**
Ashley Carty (ENG) (92)	5
**Liam Highfield (ENG) (60)**	**6**
Chatchapong Nasa (THA) (101)	4
Jiang Jun (CHN) (61)	3
**Cheung Ka Wai (HKG) (100)**	**6**
Louis Heathcote (ENG) (68)	1
**Riley Powell (WAL) (a)**	**6**
Matthew Stevens (WAL) (52)	2
**Alfie Burden (ENG) (109)**	**6**
**Liam Davies (WAL) (77)**	**6**
Stuart Carrington (ENG) (116)	4
Ian Burns (ENG) (78)
Xu Yichen (CHN) (83)
Ben Woollaston (ENG) (51)
Mark Joyce (ENG) (a)
Ishpreet Singh Chadha (IND) (67)
Sanderson Lam (ENG) (a)
Ben Mertens (BEL) (62)
Jimmy White (ENG) (99)
Scott Donaldson (SCO) (59)
Anton Kazakov (UKR) (113)
Dylan Emery (WAL) (70)
Liam Graham (SCO) (91)
Oliver Lines (ENG) (54)
Oliver Sykes (ENG) (107)
Steven Hallworth (ENG) (75)
Mina Awad (EGY) (123)
Gao Yang (CHN) (74)
Reanne Evans (ENG) (87)
Robbie Williams (ENG) (55)
Alexander Ursenbacher (SUI) (106)
Liam Pullen (ENG) (71)
Deng Haohui (CHN) (115)
David Lilley (ENG) (58)
Luo Zetao (CHN) (103)
Sam Craigie (ENG) (63)
Julien Leclercq (BEL) (98)
Jordan Brown (NIR) (66)
T. Tirapongpaiboon (THA) (95)
Ricky Walden (ENG) (50)
Fergal Quinn (NIR) (111)
Ross Muir (SCO) (79)
Wang Xinbo (CHN) (82)

**Round 3 (Last 80)**; Best of 11 frames
Jak Jones (WAL) (17)
Joshua Thomond (ENG) (a)
Matthew Selt (ENG) (48)
He Guoqiang (CHN) (49)
Joe O'Connor (ENG) (32)
Gong Chenzhi (CHN) (96)
Noppon Saengkham (THA) (33)
Jamie Jones (WAL) (64)
Michael Holt (ENG) (40)
Martin O'Donnell (ENG) (57)
Si Jiahui (CHN) (25)
Iulian Boiko (UKR) (72)
Jimmy Robertson (ENG) (41)
Long Zehuang (CHN) (56)
Elliot Slessor (ENG) (24)
Artemijs Žižins (LVA) (88)
Zhang Anda (CHN) (21)
Yao Pengcheng (CHN) (76)
Stan Moody (ENG) (44)
Liu Hongyu (CHN) (53)
Gary Wilson (ENG) (28)
Lyu Haotian (CHN) (69)
Anthony McGill (SCO) (37)
Liam Highfield (ENG) (60)
Tom Ford (ENG) (36)
Cheung Ka Wai (HKG) (100)
Pang Junxu (CHN) (29)
Riley Powell (WAL) (a)
Fan Zhengyi (CHN) (45)
Alfie Burden (ENG) (109)
Stuart Bingham (ENG) (20)
Liam Davies (WAL) (77)
Jack Lisowski (ENG) (19)
Xu Si (CHN) (46)
Hossein Vafaei (IRN) (30)
Aaron Hill (IRL) (35)
Jackson Page (WAL) (38)
Lei Peifan (CHN) (27)
Zak Surety (ENG) (43)
Thepchaiya Un-Nooh (THA) (22)
Ding Junhui (CHN) (23)
Ryan Day (WAL) (42)
Yuan Sijun (CHN) (26)
Luca Brecel (BEL) (39)
David Gilbert (ENG) (34)
Stephen Maguire (SCO) (31)
Daniel Wells (WAL) (47)
Zhou Yuelong (CHN) (18)

**Round 4 (Last 48)**; Best of 11 frames

Note: w/d=withdrawn; w/o=walkover

== Century breaks ==
=== Qualifying stage centuries ===
A total of 25 century breaks have been made during the qualifying stage of the tournament in Leicester.

- 140 – Alfie Burden
- 137 – Andrew Higginson
- 132, 109, 103 – Artemijs Žižins
- 131 – Ashley Carty
- 130 – Liam Davies
- 127 – Ashley Hugill
- 126 – Huang Jiahao
- 122 – Vladislav Gradinari
- 120 – Iulian Boiko
- 118 – Wang Xinbo
- 115 – Martin O'Donnell
- 114 – Jamie Jones
- 111 – Hammad Miah
- 109 – He Guoqiang
- 108 – Chatchapong Nasa
- 108 – Yao Pengcheng
- 107, 106 – Thanawat Tirapongpaiboon
- 107, 102 – Alexander Ursenbacher
- 104 – Jiang Jun
- 104 – Matthew Stevens
- 102 – Luo Zetao
- 102 – Lyu Haotian
