= 2026 International Championship =

Snooker tournament

Tournament information
- Dates: 31 October – 7 November 2026
- Venue: SNCNFC
- City: Nanjing
- Country: China
- Organisation: World Snooker Tour
- Format: Ranking event
- Total prize fund: £825,000
- Winner's share: £175,000
- Highest break: Thepchaiya Un-Nooh (THA) (147)

Final
- Champion: Kyren Wilson (ENG)
- Runner-up: John Higgins (SCO)
- Score: 10–8

The 2026 International Championship was a professional snooker tournament that took place from 31 October to 7 November 2026 at the South New City National Fitness Center (SNCNFC) in Nanjing, China. Qualifiers took place from 17 to 19 September at the Leicester Arena in Leicester, England. The 12th edition of the International Championship since it was first staged in 2012, it was the eighth ranking event of the 2026–27 snooker season, following the 2026 Northern Ireland Open and preceding the 2026 UK Championship.

Wu Yize was the defending champion, having defeated John Higgins 10–6 in the 2025 final but he was beaten by Stephen Maguire in the last 32.

Kyren Wilson beat John Higgins 10–8 in the final to win the tournament.

== Overview ==
The International Championship is a professional ranking snooker tournament held in China. It first took place in 2012 and the inaugural champion was Judd Trump, who defeated Neil Robertson 10–8 in the final. Staged from 2012 to 2014 in Chengdu and from 2015 to 2019 in Daqing, the tournament was not held from 2020 to 2022 due to the impact of the COVID-19 pandemic. Following its return to the calendar, the tournament was staged in Tianjin in 2023 and Nanjing in 2024 and 2025.

The 2026 edition of the tournament—the 12th staging of the event—took place from 31 October to 7 November in Nanjing. Qualifiers took place from 17 to 19 September at the Leicester Arena in Leicester, England. it was the eighth ranking event of the 2026–27 snooker season, following the 2026 Northern Ireland Open and preceding the 2026 UK Championship. Wu Yize was the defending champion, having defeated John Higgins 10–6 in the 2025 final, but he was beaten 5–6 by Stephen Maguire in the last 32.

Kyren Wilson won the tournament, beating John Higgins 10–8 in the final. There were 145 century breaks made in the event, with 45 made during qualifying, and 100 made at the main stage. The highest break was a 147 made by Thepchaiya Un-Nooh.

=== Format ===
All matches were played as the best of 11 frames up to the semi‑finals, which were played as the best of 17 frames, held over two sessions. The final was the best of 19 frames, also held over two sessions.

=== Prize fund ===
The prize fund for the tournament is detailed below.

- Winner: £175,000
- Runner-up: £75,000
- Semi-final: £33,000
- Quarter-final: £22,000
- Last 16: £14,000
- Last 32: £9,000
- Last 64: £5,000
- Highest break: £5,000
- Total: £825,000

== Summary ==
=== Qualifying ===
Kyren Wilson defeated Leone Crowley 6–5, Barry Hawkins whitewashed Oliver Sykes, Huang Jiahao defeated Jimmy Robertson 6–5, Yao Pengcheng beat Elliot Slessor 6–2, Gao Yang defeated Jordan Brown 6–5, Zhang Anda whitewashed Artemijs Žižins, and Stephen Maguire beat Mateusz Baranowski 6–5. Jimmy White defeated Matthew Stevens 6–5, Mina Awad, the African champion, beat Zak Surety 6–1, David Grace defeated Tom Ford 6–5, Neil Robertson whitewashed Alexander Ursenbacher, and Jak Jones beat Liam Pullen 6–3.

Mark Williams beat Andrew Higginson 6–4, Mark Selby beat Luo Zetao 6–1, Wang Xinbo defeated David Gilbert 6–4, and Thepchaiya Un-Nooh whitewashed Chatchapong Nasa. Dylan Emery defeated Xiao Guodong 6–4, Luca Brecel beat Jamie Clarke 6–3, and Ishpreet Singh Chadha beat Deng Haohui 6–1.

Shaun Murphy recovered from 0–3 down to beat Zhao Hanyang 6–4, Joe O'Connor defeated Bai Yulu 6–5, Gary Wilson beat Ng On-yee 6–2, and Chang Bingyu whitewashed Fergal Quinn. Anton Kazakov beat Ali Carter 6–2, Stan Moody whitewashed Panchaya Channoi, and Liam Davies beat Anthony McGill 6–1.

=== Last 64 ===
Murphy, Hawkins, and Brecel withdrew and so Mitchell Mann, Ricky Walden and Un-Nooh were given walkovers to the last 32, respectively.

Chang became the 94th player to reach 100 century breaks in the seventh frame of his 6–2 win over Ross Muir.

=== Last 32 ===
Un-Nooh made the eighth maximum break of his professional career in his 3–6 loss to Williams. It was the sixth 147 of the season, and the 247th official maximum.

Maguire defeated defending champion Wu Yize 6–5. Sam Craigie potted a re-spotted black in the deciding frame, but the cue ball went in-off to hand Zhao Xintong a 6–5 win.

=== Final ===
The final was played on 7 November as the best of 19 frames, played over two sessions. Kyren Wilson faced John Higgins.

At the end of the afternoon session Higgins led Wilson 5–4. Wilson went on to win the match, and the tournament 10–8.

== Main draw ==
The draw for the tournament is shown below. Numbers in the column to the left of the players' names denote the players' seeding, an "(a)" indicates amateur players not on the World Snooker Tour, and players in bold denote match winners.

=== Top half ===
**Last 64**; Best of 11 frames
**1** | **Wu Yize (CHN)** | **6**
54 | Robbie Williams (ENG) | 1
**32** | **Stephen Maguire (SCO)** | **6**
36 | Jackson Page (WAL) | 3
**15** | **Ding Junhui (CHN)** | **6**
Gao Yang (CHN) | 2
**19** | **Zhang Anda (CHN)** | **6**
Huang Jiahao (CHN) | 3
**45** | **Ben Woollaston (ENG)** | **6**
Yao Pengcheng (CHN) | 5
**52** | **Oliver Lines (ENG)** | **6**
Dylan Emery (WAL) | 4
**42** | **Ryan Day (WAL)** | **6**
26 | Lei Peifan (CHN) | 4
Liam Highfield (ENG) | 5
**8** | **Kyren Wilson (ENG)** | **6**
5 | Judd Trump (ENG) | 5
**53** | **Fan Zhengyi (CHN)** | **6**
**27** | **Pang Junxu (CHN)** | **6**
Mina Awad (EGY) | 2
10 (Note: Barry Hawkins withdrew and so Ricky Walden was given a walkover to the last 32.) | Barry Hawkins (ENG) | w/d
**57** | **Ricky Walden (ENG)** | **w/o**
18 | Zhou Yuelong (CHN) | 2
**Liam Davies (WAL)** | **6**
David Grace (ENG) | 4
**17** | **Si Jiahui (CHN)** | **6**
**55** | **Liu Hongyu (CHN)** | **6**
Louis Heathcote (ENG) | 1
Stuart Carrington (ENG) | 0
**28** | **Hossein Vafaei (IRN)** | **6**
Jimmy White (ENG) | 2
**4** | **Mark Selby (ENG)** | **6**

**Last 32**; Best of 11 frames
(China) Wu Yize | 5
**(Scotland) Stephen Maguire** | **6**
**(China) Ding Junhui** | **6**
(China) Zhang Anda | 5
(England) Ben Woollaston | 5
**(England) Oliver Lines** | **6**
(Wales) Ryan Day | 1
**(England) Kyren Wilson** | **6**
**(China) Fan Zhengyi** | **6**
(China) Pang Junxu | 2
(England) Ricky Walden | 5
**(Wales) Liam Davies** | **6**
**(China) Si Jiahui** | **6**
(China) Liu Hongyu | 0
**(Iran) Hossein Vafaei** | **6**
(England) Mark Selby | 2

**Last 16**; Best of 11 frames
(Scotland) Stephen Maguire | 5
**(China) Ding Junhui** | **6**
(England) Oliver Lines | 5
**(England) Kyren Wilson** | **6**
**(China) Fan Zhengyi** | **6**
(Wales) Liam Davies | 4
(China) Si Jiahui | 3
**(Iran) Hossein Vafaei** | **6**

**Quarter-finals**; Best of 11 frames
(China) Ding Junhui | 4
**(England) Kyren Wilson** | **6**
**(China) Fan Zhengyi** | **6**
(Iran) Hossein Vafaei | 3

**Semi-finals**; Best of 17 frames
**8** | **(England) Kyren Wilson** | **9**
53 | (China) Fan Zhengyi | 6

Note: w/d=withdrawn; w/o=walkover

=== Bottom half ===
**Last 64**; Best of 11 frames
**3** | **Neil Robertson (AUS)** | **6**
63 | Jiang Jun (CHN) | 2
31 | Jak Jones (WAL) | 3
**Wang Xinbo (CHN)** | **6**
Ashley Carty (ENG) | 1
**Julien Leclercq (BEL)** | **6**
20 | Stuart Bingham (ENG) | 4
**Marco Fu (HKG)** | **6**
40 (Note: Luca Brecel withdrew and so Thepchaiya Un-Nooh was given a walkover to the last 32.) | Luca Brecel (BEL) | w/d
**21** | **Thepchaiya Un-Nooh (THA)** | **w/o**
58 | Ishpreet Singh Chadha (IND) | 2
**9** | **Mark Williams (WAL)** | **6**
**37** | **Xu Si (CHN)** | **6**
25 | Gary Wilson (ENG) | 4
62 | Lyu Haotian (CHN) | 3
**6** | **John Higgins (SCO)** | **6**
7 (Note: Shaun Murphy withdrew and so Mitchell Mann was given a walkover to the last 32.) | Shaun Murphy (ENG) | w/d
**Mitchell Mann (ENG)** | **w/o**
30 | Joe O'Connor (ENG) | 2
**34** | **Yuan Sijun (CHN)** | **6**
**12** | **Chris Wakelin (ENG)** | **6**
50 | Long Zehuang (CHN) | 5
**22** | **Chang Bingyu (CHN)** | **6**
Ross Muir (SCO) | 2
**38** | **Aaron Hill (IRL)** | **6**
Anton Kazakov (UKR) | 0
**51** | **Daniel Wells (WAL)** | **6**
(a) | Duane Jones (WAL) | 5
41 | Stan Moody (ENG) | 1
**Sam Craigie (ENG)** | **6**
59 | David Lilley (ENG) | 4
**2** | **Zhao Xintong (CHN)** | **6**

**Last 32**; Best of 11 frames
(Australia) Neil Robertson | 4
**(China) Wang Xinbo** | **6**
(Belgium) Julien Leclercq | 3
**(Hong Kong) Marco Fu** | **6**
(Thailand) Thepchaiya Un-Nooh | 3
**(Wales) Mark Williams** | **6**
(China) Xu Si | 2
**(Scotland) John Higgins** | **6**
(England) Mitchell Mann | 4
**(China) Yuan Sijun** | **6**
(England) Chris Wakelin | 3
**(China) Chang Bingyu** | **6**
**(Republic of Ireland) Aaron Hill** | **6**
(Wales) Daniel Wells | 2
(England) Sam Craigie | 5
**(China) Zhao Xintong** | **6**

**Last 16**; Best of 11 frames
(China) Wang Xinbo | 5
**(Hong Kong) Marco Fu** | **6**
(Wales) Mark Williams | 5
**(Scotland) John Higgins** | **6**
(China) Yuan Sijun | 2
**(China) Chang Bingyu** | **6**
(Republic of Ireland) Aaron Hill | 3
**(China) Zhao Xintong** | **6**

**Quarter-finals**; Best of 11 frames
(Hong Kong) Marco Fu | 3
**(Scotland) John Higgins** | **6**
**(China) Chang Bingyu** | **6**
(China) Zhao Xintong | 3

**Semi-finals**; Best of 17 frames
**6** | **(Scotland) John Higgins** | **9**
22 | (China) Chang Bingyu | 2

Note: w/d=withdrawn; w/o=walkover

=== Final: frame scores ===
Final: Best of 19 frames. Referee: Zhu Ying; SNCNFC, Nanjing, China, 7 November 2026
| **Kyren Wilson** (8); England | **10**–8 | John Higgins (6); Scotland |
Afternoon: **88**–1, 0–**76**, 0–**141** (141), **85**–7, **117**–4, 8–**68**, **86**–37, 8–**71**, 1–**75**; Evening: **91**–6, 69–**74**, **130**–0 (130), 54–**66**, **80**–0, **70**–56, **101**–0 (101), 44–**80**, **81**–36
| (frame 12) 130 | Highest break | **141** (frame 3) |
| **2** | Century breaks | 1 |

== Qualifying round ==
All matches were the best of 11 frames. The four Chinese wildcards were Chen Qi'en, Dong Zihao, Li Jun, and Wang Xinzhong.

=== Pre-qualifying round ===
The following three matches were held over to the main arena in Nanjing to determine the opponents of Jackson Page, Judd Trump and Fan Zhengyi respectively.

- **Michał Szubarczyk** (POL) (78) **6**–4 Chen Qi'en (CHN) (a)
- **Liu Wenwei** (CHN) (84) **6**–5 Dong Zihao (CHN) (a)
- **Steven Hallworth** (ENG) (73) **6**–1 Li Jun (CHN) (a)

=== Last 128 ===
The results of the qualifying matches are shown below. Numbers in parentheses after the players' names denote the players' seeding, an "a" indicates amateur players who were not on the main World Snooker Tour, and players in bold denote match winners. Matches held over to the main arena are marked with a dagger (^{†}).

**Last 128**; Best of 11 frames
**Wu Yize (CHN) (1)^{†}** | **6**
Hammad Miah (ENG) (103) | 0
**Robbie Williams (ENG) (54)** | **6**
Gong Chenzhi (CHN) (112) | 2
**Stephen Maguire (SCO) (32)** | **6**
Mateusz Baranowski (POL) (85) | 5
**Jackson Page (WAL) (36)^{†}** | **6**
Michał Szubarczyk (POL) (78) | 2
**Ding Junhui (CHN) (15)^{†}** | **6**
Sahil Nayyar (CAN) (93) | 4
Jordan Brown (NIR) (64) | 5
**Gao Yang (CHN) (74)** | **6**
**Zhang Anda (CHN) (19)** | **6**
Artemijs Žižins (LVA) (96) | 0
Jimmy Robertson (ENG) (46) | 5
**Huang Jiahao (CHN) (111)** | **6**
**Ben Woollaston (ENG) (45)** | **6**
Sean O'Sullivan (ENG) (115) | 2
Elliot Slessor (ENG) (23) | 2
**Yao Pengcheng (CHN) (75)** | **6**
**Oliver Lines (ENG) (52)** | **6**
Connor Benzey (ENG) (92) | 0
Xiao Guodong (CHN) (11) | 4
**Dylan Emery (WAL) (68)** | **6**
**Ryan Day (WAL) (42)** | **6**
Liam Graham (SCO) (87) | 4
**Lei Peifan (CHN) (26)** | **6**
Iulian Boiko (UKR) (72) | 1
Ben Mertens (BEL) (60) | 3
**Liam Highfield (ENG) (69)** | **6**
**Kyren Wilson (ENG) (8)** | **6**
Leone Crowley (IRL) (86) | 5

**Last 128**; Best of 11 frames
**Judd Trump (ENG) (5)^{†}** | **6**
Liu Wenwei (CHN) (84) | 3
**Fan Zhengyi (CHN) (53)^{†}** | **6**
Steven Hallworth (ENG) (73) | 1
**Pang Junxu (CHN) (27)^{†}** | **6**
Wang Xinzhong (CHN) (a) | 4
Zak Surety (ENG) (43) | 1
**Mina Awad (EGY) (127)** | **6**
**Barry Hawkins (ENG) (10)** | **6**
Oliver Sykes (ENG) (101) | 0
**Ricky Walden (ENG) (57)** | **6**
Paul Norris (ENG) (124) | 1
**Zhou Yuelong (CHN) (18)** | **6**
Ashley Hugill (ENG) (123) | 3
Anthony McGill (SCO) (39) | 1
**Liam Davies (WAL) (90)** | **6**
Tom Ford (ENG) (35) | 5
**David Grace (ENG) (77)** | **6**
**Si Jiahui (CHN) (17)** | **6**
Liu Yang (CHN) (119) | 0
**Liu Hongyu (CHN) (55)** | **6**
Lan Yuhao (CHN) (79) | 3
Joshua Thomond (ENG) (a) (Note: Joshua Thomond replaced Ronnie O'Sullivan who withdrew.) | 3
**Louis Heathcote (ENG) (67)** | **6**
He Guoqiang (CHN) (44) | 4
**Stuart Carrington (ENG) (121)** | **6**
**Hossein Vafaei (IRN) (28)** | **6**
Cheung Ka Wai (HKG) (107) | 1
Matthew Stevens (WAL) (49) | 5
**Jimmy White (ENG) (97)** | **6**
**Mark Selby (ENG) (4)** | **6**
Luo Zetao (CHN) (113) | 1

**Last 128**; Best of 11 frames
**Neil Robertson (AUS) (3)** | **6**
Alexander Ursenbacher (SUI) (91) | 0
**Jiang Jun (CHN) (63)** | **6**
Florian Nüßle (AUT) (89) | 3
**Jak Jones (WAL) (31)** | **6**
Liam Pullen (ENG) (66) | 3
David Gilbert (ENG) (33) | 4
**Wang Xinbo (CHN) (105)** | **6**
Jack Lisowski (ENG) (16) | 5
**Ashley Carty (ENG) (100)** | **6**
Martin O'Donnell (ENG) (56) | 4
**Julien Leclercq (BEL) (110)** | **6**
**Stuart Bingham (ENG) (20)** | **6**
Alfie Burden (ENG) (99) | 1
Michael Holt (ENG) (48) | 3
**Marco Fu (HKG) (70)** | **6**
**Luca Brecel (BEL) (40)** | **6**
Jamie Clarke (WAL) (102) | 3
**Thepchaiya Un-Nooh (THA) (21)** | **6**
Chatchapong Nasa (THA) (94) | 0
**Ishpreet Singh Chadha (IND) (58)** | **6**
Deng Haohui (CHN) (118) | 1
**Mark Williams (WAL) (9)** | **6**
Andrew Higginson (ENG) (106) | 4
**Xu Si (CHN) (37)** | **6**
Xu Yichen (CHN) (80) | 3
**Gary Wilson (ENG) (25)** | **6**
Ng On-yee (HKG) (104) | 2
**Lyu Haotian (CHN) (62)** | **6**
Mahmoud El Hareedy (EGY) (108) | 3
**John Higgins (SCO) (6)** | **6**
Craig Steadman (ENG) (117) | 2

**Last 128**; Best of 11 frames
**Shaun Murphy (ENG) (7)** | **6**
Zhao Hanyang (CHN) (81) | 4
Jamie Jones (WAL) (61) | 3
**Mitchell Mann (ENG) (98)** | **6**
**Joe O'Connor (ENG) (30)** | **6**
Bai Yulu (CHN) (126) | 5
**Yuan Sijun (CHN) (34)** | **6**
Scott Donaldson (SCO) (65) | 4
**Chris Wakelin (ENG) (12)** | **6**
Michael Larkov (UKR) (122) | 0
**Long Zehuang (CHN) (50)** | **6**
Phil O'Kane (ENG) (120) | 2
**Chang Bingyu (CHN) (22)** | **6**
Fergal Quinn (NIR) (95) | 0
Matthew Selt (ENG) (47) | 2
**Ross Muir (SCO) (82)** | **6**
**Aaron Hill (IRL) (38)** | **6**
Antoni Kowalski (POL) (114) | 3
Ali Carter (ENG) (24) | 2
**Anton Kazakov (UKR) (116)** | **6**
**Daniel Wells (WAL) (51)** | **6**
Oliver Brown (ENG) (88) | 2
**Duane Jones (WAL) (a) (Note: Duane Jones replaced Mark Allen who withdrew.)** | **6**
T. Tirapongpaiboon (THA) (109) | 3
**Stan Moody (ENG) (41)** | **6**
Panchaya Channoi (THA) (125) | 0
Noppon Saengkham (THA) (29) | 3
**Sam Craigie (ENG) (71)** | **6**
**David Lilley (ENG) (59)** | **6**
Reanne Evans (ENG) (83) | 1
**Zhao Xintong (CHN) (2)^{†}** | **6**
Ian Burns (ENG) (76) | 1

Note: ^{†} Match held over to the main venue in Nanjing.

== Century breaks ==
=== Main stage centuries ===
A total of 100 century breaks were made during the main stage of the tournament in Nanjing.

- 147 – Thepchaiya Un-Nooh
- 146, 141, 131, 122, 110, 103, 103 – John Higgins
- 146, 129 – Joe O'Connor
- 143, 115 – Pang Junxu
- 143, 101 – Judd Trump
- 140, 114, 106, 103 – Aaron Hill
- 138, 136, 128, 115, 112, 109, 107, 104, 104, 103, 102, 101, 100 – Chang Bingyu
- 137, 132, 109, 102 – Ding Junhui
- 137, 129, 129, 118, 110 – Wu Yize
- 136 – Mark Selby
- 133, 131, 131, 128, 113 – Zhao Xintong
- 133, 131, 104, 101 – Si Jiahui
- 133, 112 – Neil Robertson
- 133, 107, 105 – Stephen Maguire
- 132, 111, 106 – Zhang Anda
- 131, 130, 124 – Wang Xinbo
- 130, 127, 102, 101, 101, 100 – Kyren Wilson
- 130, 107 – Sam Craigie
- 128 – Ben Woollaston
- 126, 123 – Mark Williams
- 126, 118, 114, 107, 102 – Hossein Vafaei
- 123 – Stan Moody
- 121, 118, 101 – Liam Davies
- 120, 113 – Oliver Lines
- 120 – Liu Hongyu
- 120 – Chris Wakelin
- 117, 104, 103 – Jackson Page
- 115 – Gao Yang
- 113, 101 – Daniel Wells
- 111, 103 – Fan Zhengyi
- 103, 103 – Yuan Sijun
- 102 – Ian Burns
- 102 – Marco Fu
- 102 – Liam Highfield
- 102 – Lyu Haotian
- 102 – Sahil Nayyar

=== Qualifying stage centuries ===
A total of 45 century breaks were made during the qualifying stage of the tournament in Leicester.

- 142 – Kyren Wilson
- 137, 106 – Stuart Carrington
- 135, 117, 103 – David Grace
- 132 – Jack Lisowski
- 130 – David Gilbert
- 130 – Xiao Guodong
- 128 – John Higgins
- 125, 105 – Gao Yang
- 123 – Lyu Haotian
- 121 – Mark Selby
- 121 – Matthew Stevens
- 120 – Luo Zetao
- 117 – Liu Hongyu
- 114 – Ishpreet Singh Chadha
- 113 – Florian Nüßle
- 111 – Thepchaiya Un-Nooh
- 108 – Liam Davies
- 108 – Jak Jones
- 107 – Jamie Clarke
- 107 – Zhao Hanyang
- 106, 104 – Hossein Vafaei
- 106 – Liam Highfield
- 106 – Liam Pullen
- 106 – Xu Si
- 105, 100 – Neil Robertson
- 105 – Dylan Emery
- 105 – Liam Graham
- 105 – Yuan Sijun
- 104 – Sam Craigie
- 104 – Jimmy White
- 103 – Huang Jiahao
- 103 – Antoni Kowalski
- 103 – Stephen Maguire
- 103 – Mitchell Mann
- 103 – Thanawat Tirapongpaiboon
- 102 – Ross Muir
- 101 – Marco Fu
- 100 – Joe O'Connor
- 100 – Mark Williams
