= 2026–27 Q Tour =

Series of snooker tournaments

Details
- Duration: 26 June 2026 –
- Tournaments: 15; Organised by WPBSA: Q Tour Europe (7); Q Tour Global Play-Offs; Regional organisers: Q Tour Americas (2); Q Tour Asia-Pacific (5)

The 2026–27 Q Tour is an ongoing multi-regional series of second-tier snooker tournaments, run by the World Professional Billiards and Snooker Association (WPBSA). It took place during the 2026–27 snooker season for players not on the main tour.

== Overview ==
A series of seven Q Tour Europe events are played, with the leading money-winner gaining a place on the main tour for the 2027–28 snooker season. Eighteen players – the highest-ranked players who have not already secured a place on the main tour for the 2026–27 season – gain entry to a further event, the WPBSA Q Tour Global Play-Off. They are joined by five players from the Regional Q Tour winners outside Europe and one player from the CBSA China Tour third-ranked. These players will compete for a further three places on the World Snooker Tour.

== Q Tour Europe ==
=== Format ===
Q Tour Europe events were generally played over four days. The main draw starts on the second day when the 16 successful qualifiers are joined by the 48 seeded players who qualified based on their rankings in the 2026 Q School Orders of Merit to make a first round field of 64 players. There are two rounds on the second day and a further four on the final day, to determine the winner of the event. The 48 who qualified directly included the top 32 eligible players from the 2026 UK Q School Order of Merit, the top eight from the 2026 Asia-Oceania Q School Order of Merit, and the eight highest ranked junior players on the 2026 UK Q School Order of Merit, not already qualified.

=== Prize fund ===
Each Q Tour Europe event featured a prize fund of £30,000, with the winner receiving £6,000.

- Winner: £6,000
- Runner-up: £3,000
- Semi-final: £2,000
- Quarter-final: £1,250
- Last 16: £750
- Last 32: £350
- Total: £30,000

=== Schedule ===
The schedule for the Q Tour Europe events is given below.

Date		Country	Tournament	Venue	City	Field	Winner	Runner-up	Score	Ref.
27 Aug	30 Aug	ENG	Event 1	Northern Snooker Centre	Leeds	143	Sanderson Lam (ENG)	Farakh Ajaib (PAK)	4–1	
21 Sep	24 Sep	BUL	Event 2 (Note: Held alongside with the 2026 Autumn EBSA European Snooker Championships.)	Princess Hotel	Sofia	109	Aaron Busuttil (MLT)	Edward Jones (ENG)	4–0	
22 Oct	25 Oct	GER	Event 3	Snooker Arena Germany	Oberhausen	153	Riley Powell (WAL)	Mark Lloyd (ENG)	4–1	
12 Nov	15 Nov	AUT	Event 4	Austrian Snooker Academy	Vienna	115	Callum Beresford (ENG)	Sebastian Milewski (POL)	4–1	
3 Dec	7 Dec	ENG	Event 5	Landywood Snooker Club	Walsall					
7 Jan	10 Jan	BEL	Event 6	De Pomerans	Lochristi					
11 Feb	14 Feb	ENG	Event 7	Ding Junhui Snooker Academy	Sheffield					

== Q Tour Global ==
The Q Tour Global consisted of regional Q Tour series held outside Europe.

=== Americas series ===
The schedule for the Q Tour Americas events is given below.

Date		Country	Tournament	Venue	City	Field	Winner	Runner-up	Score	Ref.
22 Jan	24 Jan	CAN	Event 1	The Corner Bank	Toronto					
5 Feb	7 Feb	USA	Event 2	California Snooker Academy	San Jose					

=== Asia Pacific series ===
The schedule for the Q Tour Asia Pacific events is given below.

Date		Country	Tournament	Venue	City	Field	Winner	Runner-up	Score	Ref.
26 Jun	28 Jun	AUS	Event 1 (Note: Event also known as the West Coast International.)	Pot Black Snooker Centre	Perth	36	Vinnie Calabrese (AUS)	Hassan Kerde (AUS)	5–3	
10 Jul	12 Jul	NZL	Event 2 (Note: Event also known as the New Zealand Open.)	Papatoetoe Cosmopolitan Club	Auckland	45	Mark Canovan (NZL)	Joseph Conchie (NZL)	5–2	
31 Jul	2 Aug	AUS	Event 3 (Note: Event also known as the Fred Osbourne Classic.)	Commercial Club	Albury	82	Hassan Kerde (AUS)	Alan McCarthy (AUS)	4–0	
8 Oct	11 Oct	AUS	Event 4 (Note: Event also known as the Bob Hawke AC Australian Open.)	Mounties	Sydney	112	Vinnie Calabrese (AUS)	Daniell Haenga (NZL)	6–2	
22 Jan	25 Jan	AUS	Event 5 (Note: Event also known as the 2027 Clem Jones AC Queensland Open.)	Redcliffe Snooker Club	Brisbane					

== See also ==
- 2026 Q School
