= 2025 English Open (snooker) =

Snooker tournament

2025 BetVictor English Open
- Part of the Home Nations Series

Tournament information
- Dates: 11–21 September 2025
- Venue: Brentwood Centre
- City: Brentwood
- Country: England
- Organisation: World Snooker Tour
- Format: Ranking event
- Total prize fund: £550,400
- Winner's share: £100,000
- Highest break: Aaron Hill (IRL) (147); Ali Carter (ENG) (147)

Final
- Champion: Mark Allen (NIR)
- Runner-up: Zhou Yuelong (CHN)
- Score: 9–8

The 2025 English Open (officially the 2025 BetVictor English Open) was a professional snooker tournament that took place from 11 to 21 September 2025 at the Brentwood Centre in Brentwood, England. The 10th consecutive edition of the tournament since it was first staged in 2016, it was the fourth ranking event of the 2025–26 snooker season, following the 2025 Wuhan Open and preceding the 2025 British Open. It was the first of four tournaments in the season's Home Nations Series, preceding the 2025 Northern Ireland Open, the 2025 Scottish Open, and the 2026 Welsh Open. The tournament was broadcast by TNT Sports in the United Kingdom and Ireland, by Eurosport in mainland Europe, by local channels in China and elsewhere in Asia, and by WST Play in all other territories. The winner received £100,000 from a total prize fund of £550,400.

Neil Robertson was the defending champion, having defeated Wu Yize 9–7 in the 2024 final, but he lost 1–4 to Jackson Page in the last 32. The final was contested between Mark Allen and Zhou Yuelong. Allen led 6–2 after the first session, but Zhou recovered to lead 8–7 in the second session. Allen won the last two frames of the match for a 9–8 victory, securing his first English Open title, the 12th ranking title of his career, and his first ranking win since the 2024 Players Championship in February 2024. He won five consecutive matches at the event in deciding frames. Following the 2025 Saudi Arabia Snooker Masters and the 2025 Wuhan Open, it was the first time that three consecutive ranking finals had gone to deciding frames.

The event produced 82 century breaks, including two maximum breaks. Aaron Hill made the first maximum of his career during his second-round match against Yao Pengcheng, and Ali Carter made the fourth maximum of his career in his fourth-round match against Hill. These were respectively the ninth and tenth maximums of the season and the 226th and 227th official maximums in professional snooker history. Judd Trump made the 1,100th century break of his career during his third-round match against Michael Holt. Ng On-yee made a 137 break in her first-round match against Liam Highfield, then a record for the highest break by a woman in professional competition.

== Overview ==
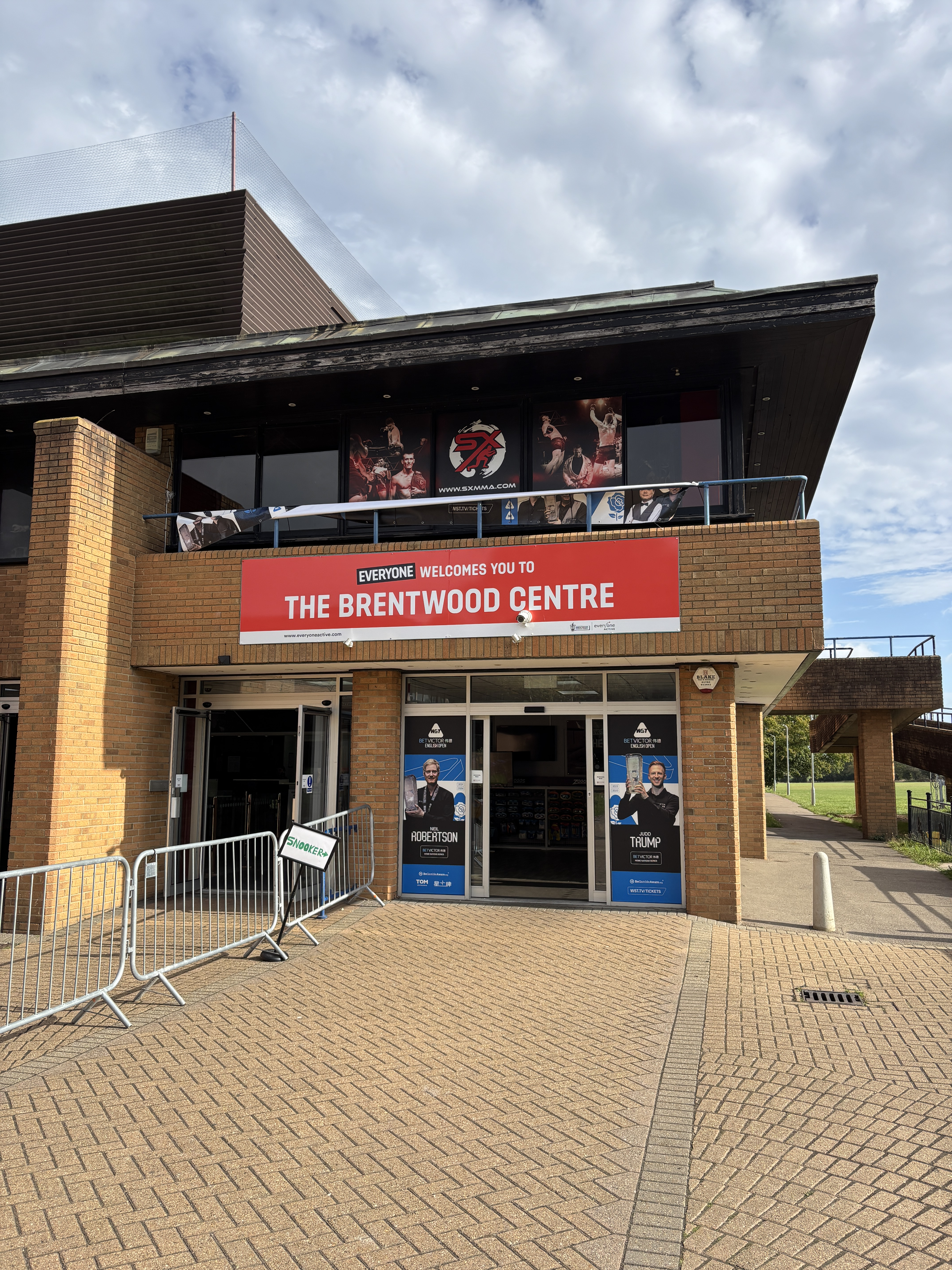
The tournament was held at the Brentwood Centre in Brentwood, England, for a fourth consecutive year.

The English Open was first staged in 2016, and the inaugural winner was Liang Wenbo, who defeated Judd Trump 9–6 in the final to win his maiden ranking title. The winner of the tournament receives the Steve Davis Trophy, which was named to honour the six-time World Champion following his retirement at the end of the 2015–16 snooker season.

The 2025 edition—the 10th consecutive staging of the event—took place from 11 to 21 September at the Brentwood Centre in Brentwood, England, the fourth consecutive year the venue had hosted the tournament. It was the fourth ranking event of the 2025–26 snooker season, following the 2025 Wuhan Open and preceding the 2025 British Open. It was also the first of four tournaments in the season's Home Nations Series, preceding the 2025 Northern Ireland Open, the 2025 Scottish Open, and the 2026 Welsh Open. Neil Robertson was the defending champion, having defeated Wu Yize 9–7 in the 2024 final.

=== Format ===
The tournament used a tiered format first implemented for the Home Nations Series in the 2024–25 snooker season. In round one, players seeded 65–96 faced those seeded 97 and below, including selected amateurs. In round two, the winners from round one faced players seeded 33–64. In round three, the winners from round two faced the top 32 seeds. All matches were played as the best of 7 frames until the quarter‑finals, which were the best of 9. The semi‑finals were the best of 11, and the final was a best‑of‑17-frame match played over two sessions.

=== Broadcasters ===
Rounds one and two were broadcast in the United Kingdom by Discovery+; rounds three and onwards were broadcast in the UK and Ireland by TNT Sports, Discovery+, and DMAX. The tournament was streamed by Discovery+ in Germany, Italy, and Austria and by HBO Max in other European territories; rounds three and onwards were broadcast in mainland Europe by Eurosport. The tournament was broadcast in mainland China by the CBSA‑WPBSA Academy WeChat Channel, the CBSA‑WPBSA Academy Douyin, Huya Live, and Migu. Rounds three and onwards were broadcast in Hong Kong by Now TV, in Malaysia and Brunei by Astro SuperSport, in Thailand by True Sports, in Taiwan by Sportcast, and in the Philippines by TAP Sports. In territories where no other coverage was available, the tournament was streamed via WST Play.

=== Prize fund ===
The prize fund for the tournament is detailed below. In addition, the player who won the most cumulative prize money across the season's four Home Nations Series events received a bonus of £150,000.

- Winner: £100,000
- Runner-up: £45,000
- Semi-final: £21,000
- Quarter-final: £13,200
- Last 16: £9,000
- Last 32: £5,400
- Last 64: £3,600
- Last 96: £1,000
- Highest break: £5,000
- Total: £550,400

== Summary ==
=== Round one (last 128) ===
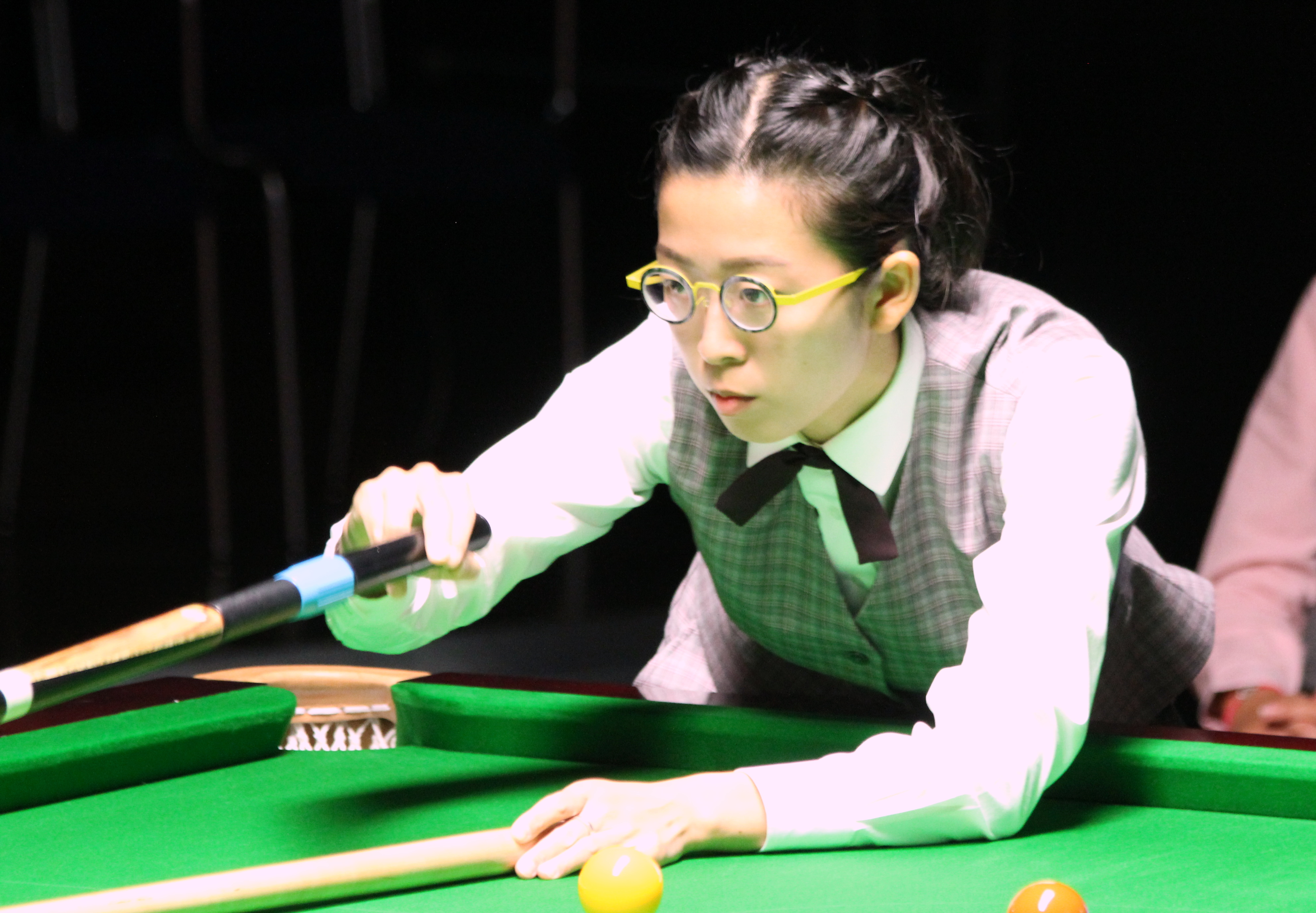
Ng On-yee (pictured in 2017) made a 137 break, then a record for the highest break by a woman in professional competition.

The first round was played on 11 and 12 September, featuring players seeded 65–96 against those seeded 97 and below, including selected amateurs. Ng On-yee made a total clearance of 137 in the second frame of her match against Liam Highfield, setting a new record for the highest break by a woman in professional competition. She broke a 33-year-old record set by Allison Fisher, who had made a 133 break in the 1992 Dubai Classic qualifiers. The record was broken again less than two months later by Bai Yulu, who made a 145 break at the 2025 International Championship. Highfield defeated Ng 4–2 after coming from 69 points behind to take the sixth frame on the last black. Two other female players advanced to the second round as the reigning World Women's Champion Bai defeated Liu Wenwei 4–3 and Mink Nutcharut beat Robbie McGuigan 4–2. Jimmy White lost the first two frames against Cheung Ka Wai but recovered to tie the scores at 2–2. Cheung won the fifth frame on a re-spotted black, but White took frame six on the colours and went on to win the deciding frame after trapping Cheung in a snooker. Marco Fu made two century breaks as he whitewashed Gao Yang in 59 minutes. Sunny Akani lost the first two frames against Oliver Brown but then won four in a row for a 4–2 victory. Chang Bingyu made breaks of 133, 60, 133, and 134 as he whitewashed Leone Crowley in 43 minutes. Liam Pullen advanced with a 4–1 victory over Lan Yuhao, while Mitchell Mann lost the first three frames against Ian Burns but recovered to win the match in a decider. Mateusz Baranowski made a highest break of 131 as he defeated Steven Hallworth, also in a deciding frame.

=== Round two (last 96) ===
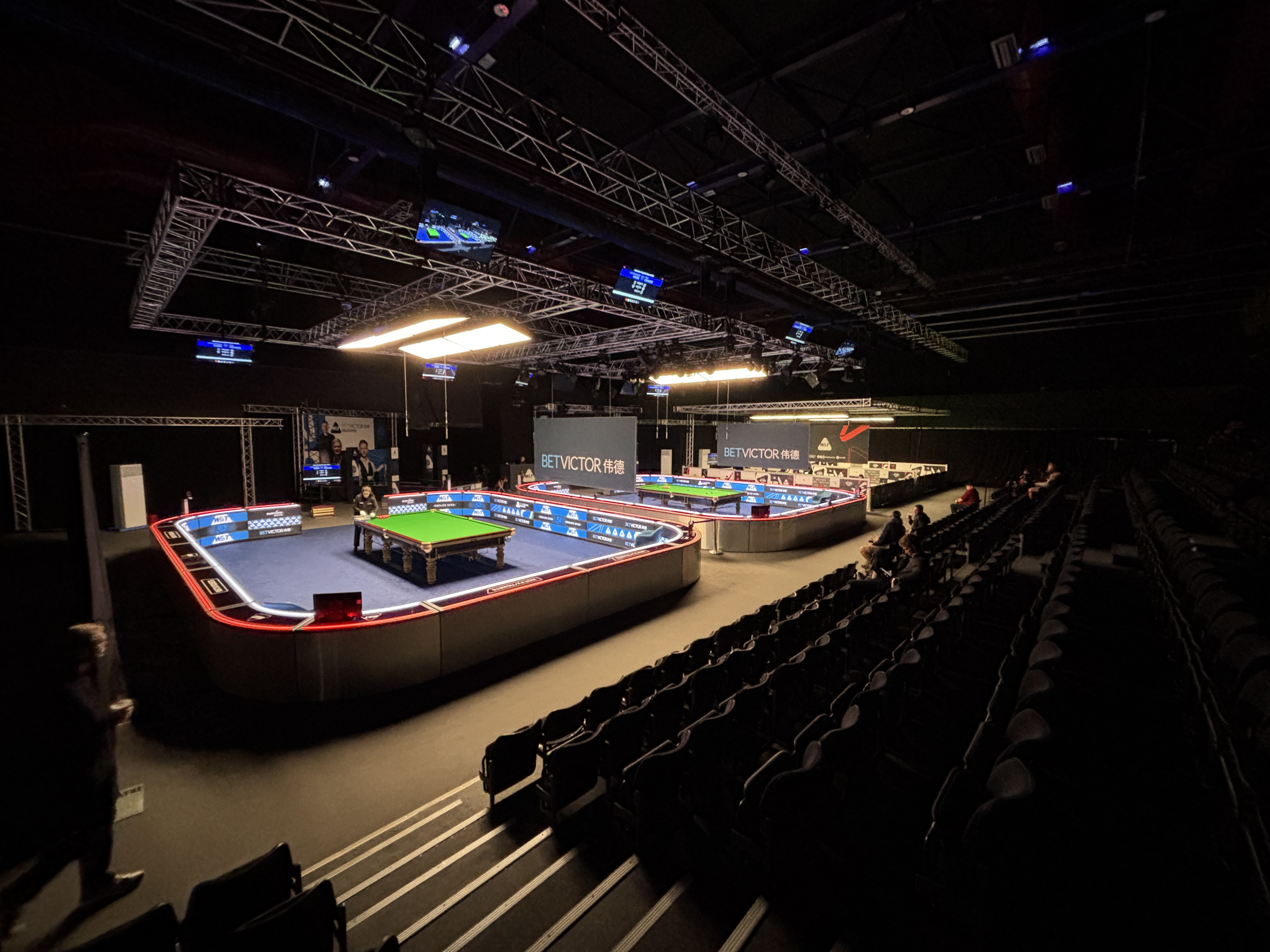
The arena at the Brentwood Centre, pictured during the event.

The second round was played on 13 and 14 September, featuring the winners from round one against players seeded 33–64. Aaron Hill made the first maximum break of his career in the first frame of his match against Yao Pengcheng. It was the ninth maximum of the season and the 226th official maximum in professional snooker history. Hill became the first player from the Republic of Ireland to make a maximum break in a professional ranking event. He went on to secure a 4–2 victory. Luca Brecel, who had not competed in the season's first three ranking events, made breaks of 51, 50, and 95 as he defeated White 4–1. Fu made a break of 110 as he whitewashed Mark Davis, his eighth victory out of ten professional matches that season. Jimmy Robertson defeated Wang Yuchen on the final black of a deciding frame, and Zak Surety also won a decider on the colours to beat Haris Tahir. Highfield trailed Oliver Lines 1–3 but tied the scores with breaks of 89 and 79 and then won the decider on the colours. Louis Heathcote made a highest break of 127 against Jordan Brown and went on to win the match in a deciding frame. Michael Holt made two centuries as he whitewashed Nutcharut, while Ricky Walden defeated Bai 4–1. Pullen advanced with a 4–1 win over Stan Moody.

=== Round three (last 64) ===
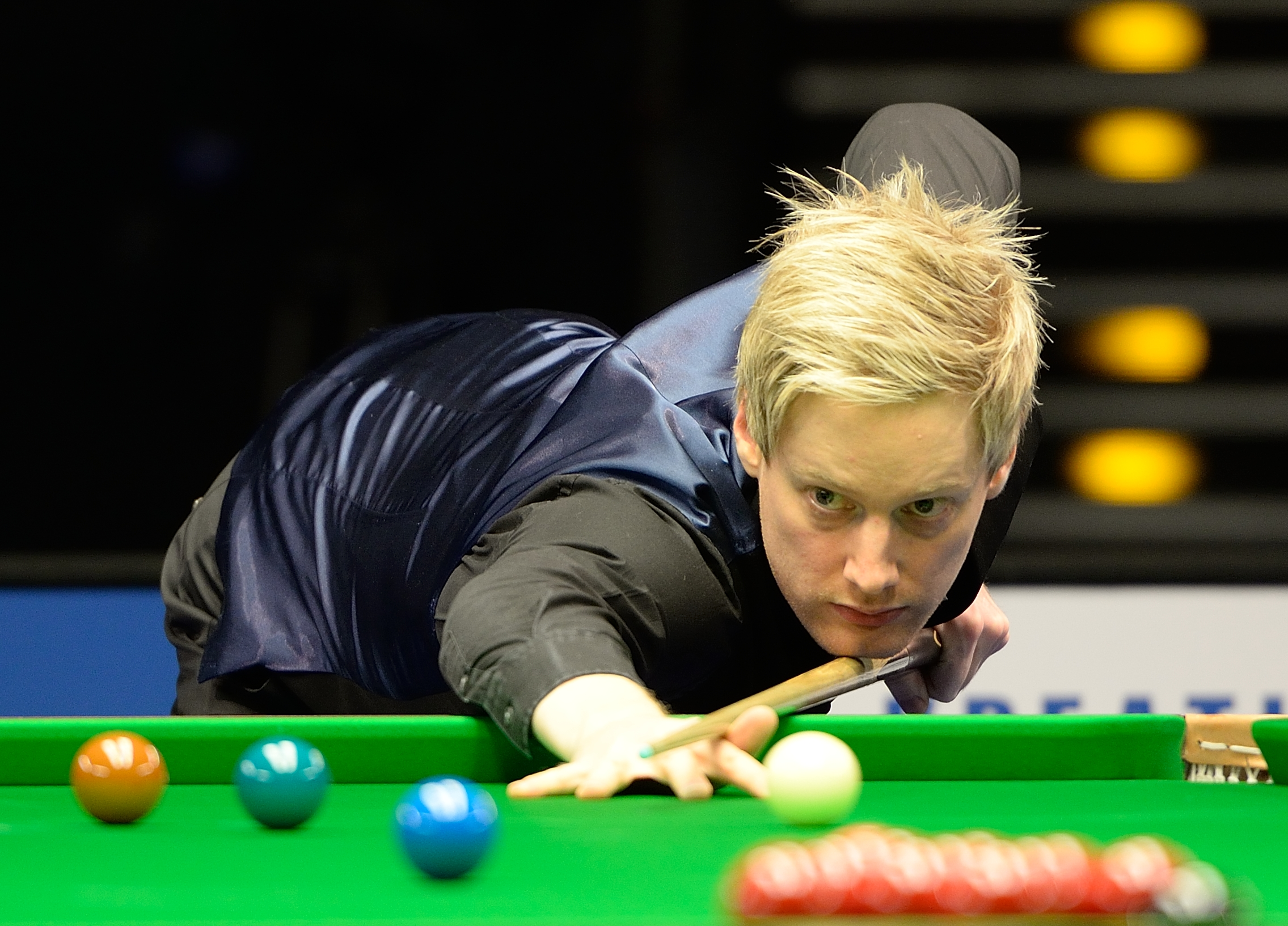
The defending champion Neil Robertson (pictured in 2015) won his third-round match against Sunny Akani but lost to Jackson Page in round four.

The third round was played on 15 and 16 September, featuring the winners from round two against the top 32 seeds. The world number 51 Robbie Williams led the 2024 World Champion and world number two Kyren Wilson 2–0 and 3–1 and went on to win the match 4–2. It was the first time Williams had beaten Wilson in professional competition, having lost all five of their previous meetings. Ding Junhui made breaks of 80, 92, 130, and 71 as he defeated Pullen 4–1. Si Jiahui defeated Liu Hongyu 4–2 after Liu lost the fifth frame of the match on the three‑miss rule. Barry Hawkins defeated Heathcote, also by a 4–2 scoreline. Mark Selby, champion in 2019 and 2022, made two centuries of 101 and 103 as he won four consecutive frames to defeat Highfield 4–1. Shaun Murphy made three consecutive centuries of 125, 135, and 133 and scored 457 points without reply as he whitewashed Zak Surety, who scored only eight points in the match. Mark Williams also advanced with a whitewash victory over Amir Sarkhosh. Brecel defeated Hossein Vafaei in a deciding frame.

The defending champion Neil Robertson, winner of the 2025 Saudi Arabia Masters a month before, had recently attended a ceremony in Melbourne to receive the Medal of the Order of Australia, having been named in the 2025 Australia Day Honours for services to snooker. Despite suffering from jet lag, he made centuries of 105 and 136 as he defeated Akani 4–1. Stuart Bingham, who had not won a match at the tournament since it moved to the Brentwood Centre in 2022, made breaks of 116, 86, 103, and 61 as he whitewashed Dylan Emery. "I've broken the duck here in Brentwood," said Bingham afterwards. "I kept my concentration and made four good breaks." The reigning World Champion Zhao Xintong made three centuries of 105, 134, and 110 as he whitewashed Ishpreet Singh Chadha, who had reached the semi-finals the previous year. The match lasted just 46 minutes.

Having changed his cue for the first time in seven years, Judd Trump made two centuries of 107 and 130 as he whitewashed Holt. His 107 break in the second frame was the 1,100th century break of his professional career. Jack Lisowski made a 128 break as he defeated Thepchaiya Un-Nooh 4–2, with both players averaging under 15 seconds a shot in the match. Gary Wilson beat Sanderson Lam 4–2, and Elliot Slessor defeated Jimmy Robertson by the same score. Having successfully defended his title at the recent 2025 Wuhan Open, Xiao Guodong won his eighth consecutive professional match as he whitewashed Gong Chenzhi. Xiao attempted a maximum break in the opening frame but missed the 14th black. Facing Stephen Maguire, Hill won the first three frames. Maguire narrowed Hill's lead to 3–2 and took a 60-point lead in frame six, but Hill made a break of 68 to secure a 4–2 victory on the last pink.

=== Round four (last 32) ===
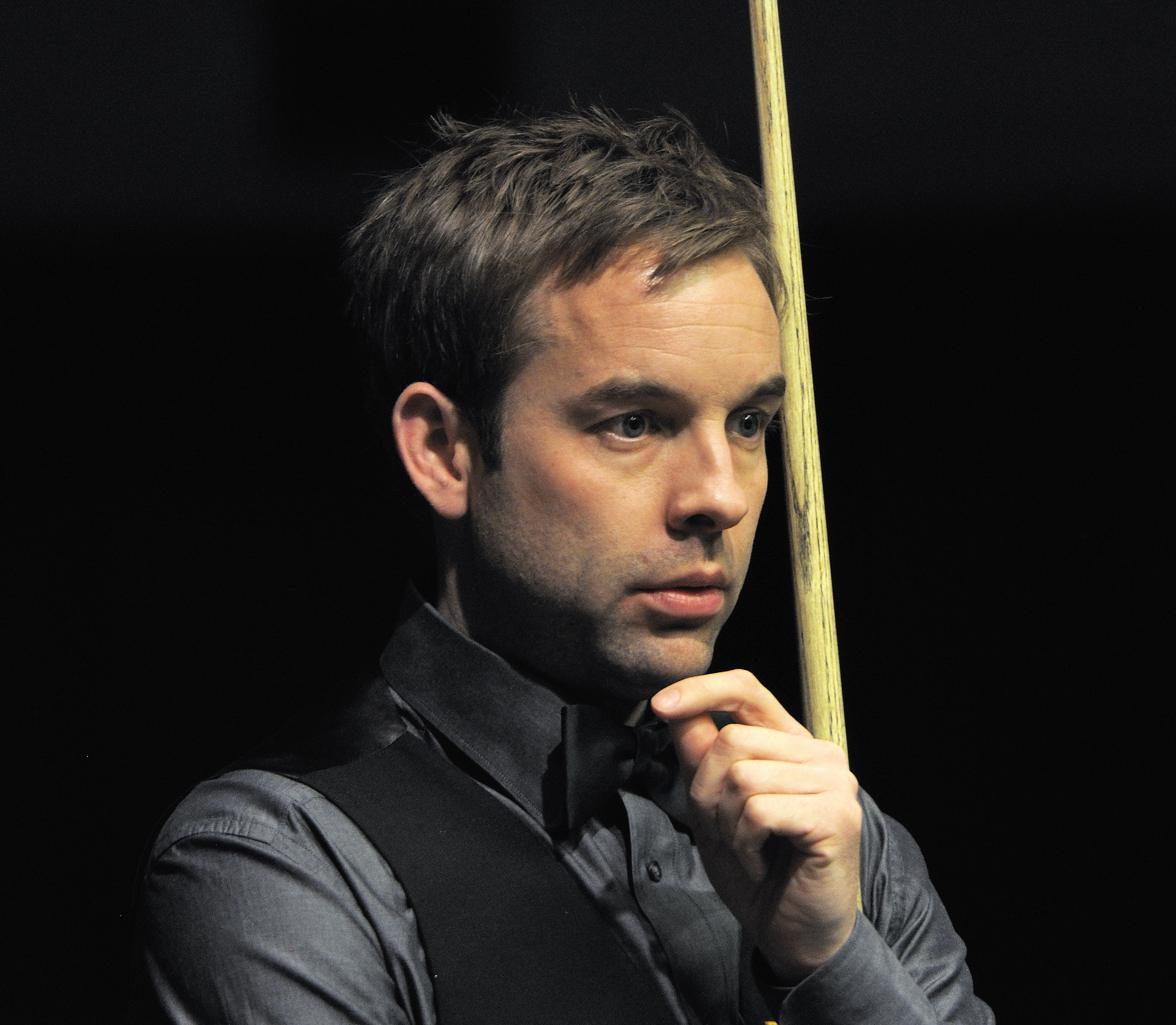
Ali Carter (pictured in 2013) made his fourth maximum break. It was the second maximum at the event, following the 147 by Aaron Hill in round two.

The fourth round was played on 17 September. Ali Carter made the fourth maximum break of his professional career in his match against Hill. It was the tenth maximum of the season and the 227th official maximum in professional snooker history. Carter made the maximum in the fourth frame to move 3–1 ahead, but Hill recovered to win the match in a deciding frame. Hill said he was "absolutely over the moon" with his comeback win and commented: "When he made the maximum I thought he would be full of adrenaline, so I said to myself this could be my chance to nick it. I managed to steal a frame to get to 3–2 and made a good break to force a decider. I played a solid enough last frame as well." Trump lost the first frame against Yuan Sijun but then won four in a row with breaks including 101, 69, and 61 as he secured a 4–1 victory. Commenting on his decision to replace his cue, Trump said: "The old one lost some of its power. There are some great new cue makers which are making powerful cues. I feel these days you need as much power as you can get. This cue has a different ferrule and feels very good in the balls." However, Trump said he would "treasure" the cue with which he had won the 2019 World Championship and many other titles.

Page made three consecutive half-century breaks to beat the defending champion Neil Robertson 4–1. Robertson's defeat continued a streak whereby no player had ever successfully defended the English Open title. Lisowski beat Zhao by the same score, compiling breaks of 92, 84, and 86. Selby made breaks of 119, 75, 55, and 87 as he whitewashed Lei Peifan, while Hawkins and Slessor also recorded whitewash wins over Tom Ford and Gary Wilson respectively. Zhou Yuelong made a 136 break as he beat Mark Williams 4–1, and Wu Yize advanced with a 4–2 win over Chris Wakelin. Murphy took consecutive frames with breaks of 79 and 140 to beat Fan Zhengyi 4–1, and Brecel won three frames in a row as he defeated Si 4–2. Mark Allen beat Bingham 4–3, making a 118 break to win the deciding frame.

=== Round five (last 16) ===
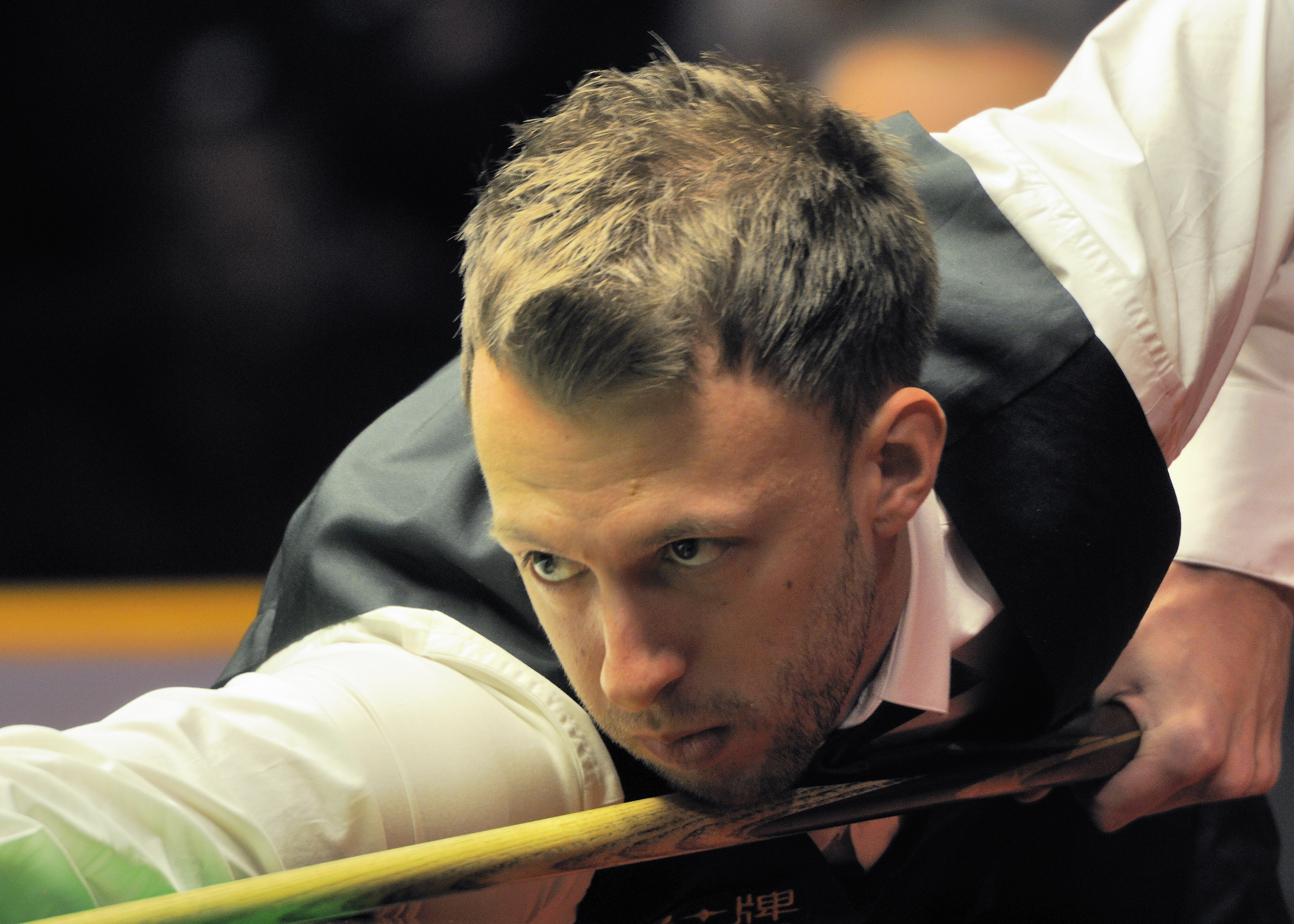
The world number one Judd Trump (pictured in 2014) made the 1,100th century break of his career at the event. He lost to Elliot Slessor in round five.

The fifth round was played on 18 September. Slessor won the first two frames against the world number one Trump and led by 68 points in the third, but Trump took the frame with a 69 break and also won frames four and five as he moved into a 3–2 lead. However, Slessor tied the scores with a 79 break and made another break of 64 to win the deciding frame. It was the 13th decider Slessor had won out of his last 18 played. Defeat for Trump meant that he had yet to reach the semi-finals of any tournament that season, having not won a title since the 2024 UK Championship. "If you win a tournament early in the season, it takes the pressure off immediately and you are able to relax," Trump said. "When you don't do that you feel you are chasing." Slessor spoke afterwards about his desire to win his first title for his 74-year-old grandfather. "He has driven me around since I was nine," he said. "I would love to be in the position to give him a trophy. The money means nothing compared to what a trophy would mean. I'll keep knocking on the door, keep trying my best and see what happens."

Allen lost the first three frames against Ding but recovered to win four consecutive frames and secure a 4–3 victory. Afterwards, he reflected on his recent lack of success on the professional tour. "I had a few years of winning quite a lot. I fancied winning all the time [but] it isn't that easy," he said. "The serial winners like Ronnie [O'Sullivan], [Stephen] Hendry, Trump and Selby make it look easy. It isn't. You have to enjoy every time you can get a victory and not get too down on yourself." Page led Murphy 3–1. Murphy made breaks of 93 and 102 to tie the scores at 3–3, but Page won the decider. Brecel also defeated Robbie Williams in a deciding frame to reach his first quarter-final of the season. Selby beat the previous year's runner-up Wu 4–2, and Zhou defeated Hawkins by the same score. Hill defeated Lisowski 4–1, making a break of 123 in the final frame of the match, and advanced to his third ranking quarter-final. Jak Jones defeated Walden in a deciding frame.

=== Quarter-finals ===
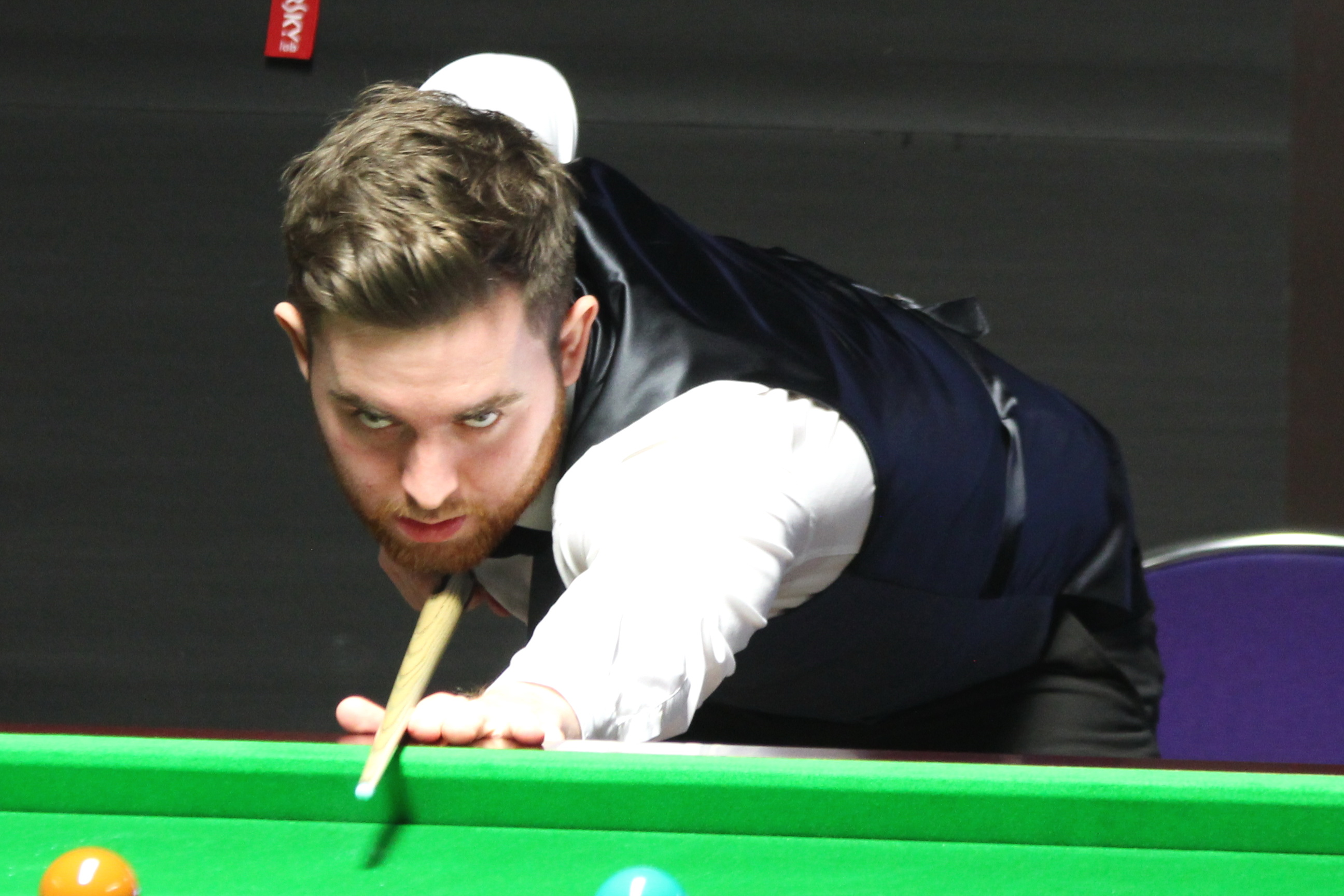
Jak Jones (pictured in 2016) defeated Aaron Hill to reach his first ranking semi-final since the 2024 World Championship.

The quarter-finals were played on 19 September as the best of 9 frames. Brecel made breaks of 81 and 75 as he took a 4–2 lead over Zhou, but Zhou made a 94 break followed by a 113 to force a deciding frame. After failing to progress beyond the last 16 of any ranking event the previous season and dropping to number 32 in the world rankings, Zhou won the 52-minute decider to reach the seventh ranking semi-final of his career. "I know [Brecel] is a very aggressive player, so I had prepared myself with more patience, focusing on tactical exchanges and waiting for his mistakes. When I was 4–2 down, I managed to make the most of my chances and force a decider," Zhou commented afterwards. Page led Selby 2–1 and 3–2, but Selby produced a break of 111 in frame six to tie the scores at 3–3 and then won frame seven to move one from victory. Page won frame eight, but Selby took the deciding frame with a break of 131, advancing to the 67th ranking semi-final of his career. The match lasted over three hours.

Hill took the first frame against Jones with a 73 break, but Jones won three in a row, making a 79 break in frame four. Hill took frame five, but Jones won the next two for a 5–2 victory. After reaching his first ranking semi-final since the 2024 World Championship, he spoke about the impact that becoming a father seven months previously had had on his form. "Last season I wasn't in a good place mentally at all," he said. "This season I feel like a completely different person and my life is good. I feel happier when I'm playing and I'm more focused. I feel that I'm playing well and I'm confident." Facing Allen, Slessor won the first four frames, making breaks of 91 and 76. In the fifth frame, Slessor missed a black off its spot, and Allen won the frame with a 55 break; he also won frame six after Slessor missed the black to the same pocket. Allen went on to tie the scores at 4–4 and force a deciding frame. Slessor made a 57 break in the decider, but Allen won the frame to secure a 5–4 victory.

=== Semi-finals ===
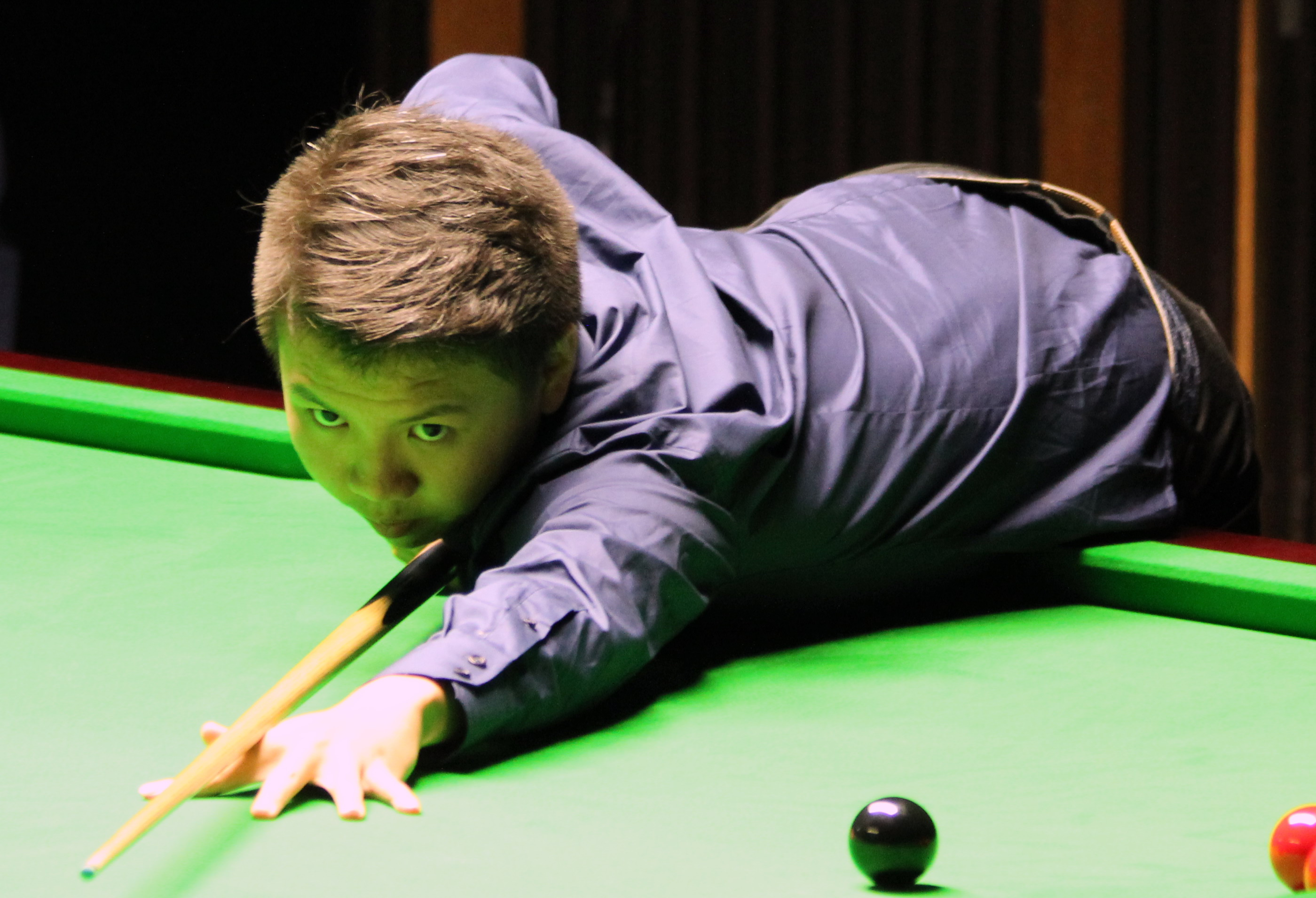
Zhou Yuelong (pictured in 2015) defeated Mark Selby to reach his fourth ranking final.

The semi-finals were played on 20 September as the best of 11 frames. In the first semi-final, Zhou played Selby. Zhou won the first two frames and then took the 59-minute third frame to move 3–0 ahead. Selby made a 71 clearance to win frame four on the last black and had the opportunity to win the fifth but Zhou took the frame after Selby missed the last red. Selby won the sixth frame, but Zhou took the seventh to move one from victory at 5–2. Selby won frame eight, but Zhou then secured a 6–3 victory and advanced to the fourth ranking final of his career. "It is a huge confidence boost for me," said Zhou. "I've gone three years without getting to a final and I played very badly last season. This season is just getting underway and it is a fantastic start."

In the second semi-final, Allen faced Jones, who made breaks of 92, 84, and 61 as he took a 3–1 lead. After the mid-session interval, Allen produced breaks of 102 and 62 to tie the scores at 3–3, but Jones won the next two frames to move 5–3 ahead. However, Allen made breaks of 68, 67, and 82 to secure a 6–5 victory. It was Allen's third consecutive comeback win at the event, having beaten Ding from 0–3 behind in the fifth round and Slessor from 0–4 behind in the quarter-finals. It was also his second consecutive match that ended after midnight. "There's a few events in my career I still want to win and the English Open is one of them," Allen said afterwards. "The Welsh Open is another and obviously the World Championship. I'd love to win tomorrow and make it three out of the four Home Nations events."

=== Final ===
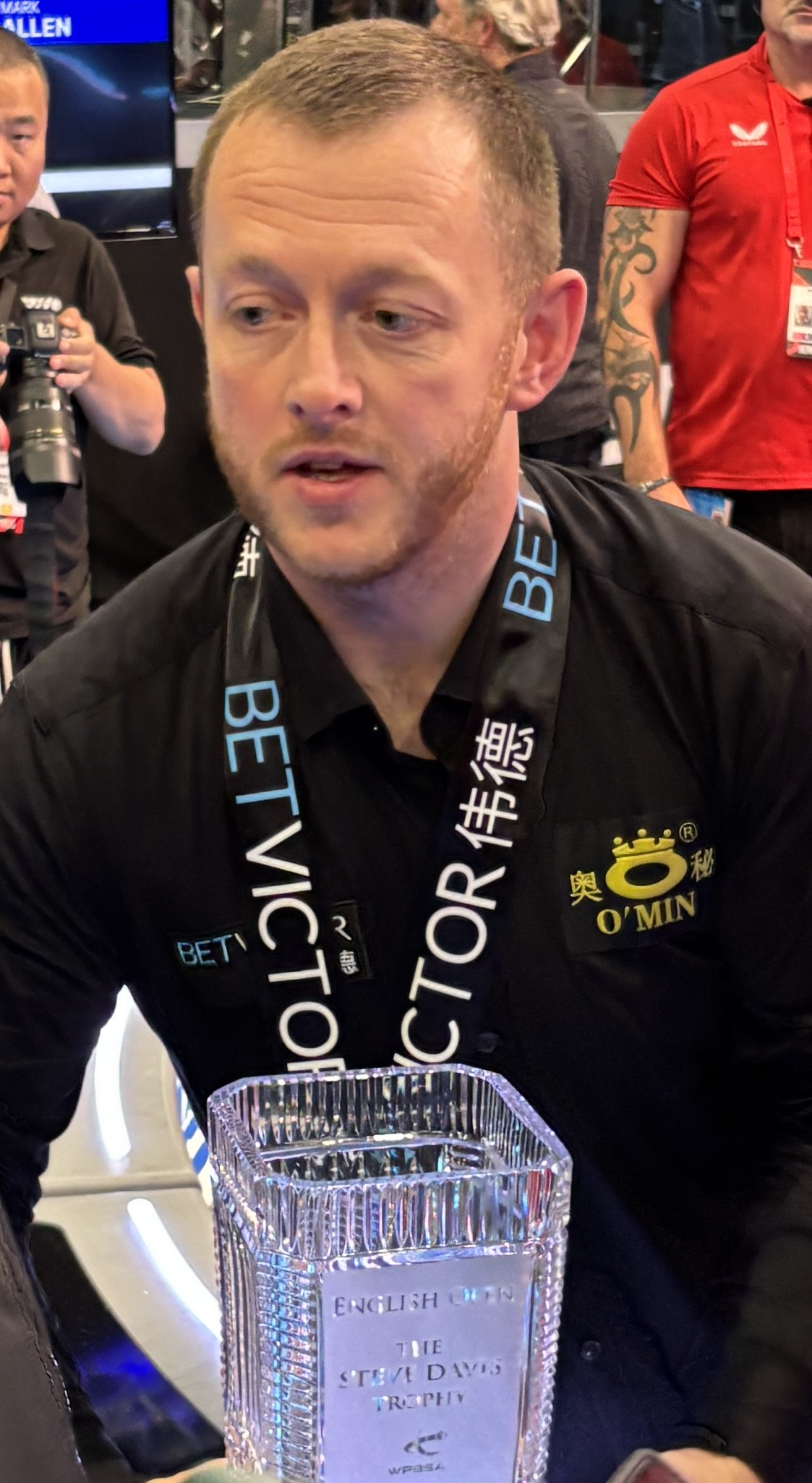
Mark Allen (pictured at the event) defeated Zhou Yuelong to win his first English Open title and 12th ranking title. He received the Steve Davis Trophy (also pictured).

The final was played on 21 September as the best of 17 frames, held over two sessions, between the world number 10 Allen and the world number 32 Zhou. Allen was playing in the 20th ranking final of his career, while Zhou was competing in his fourth. The two players had previously faced each other in a Home Nations Series final at the 2022 Northern Ireland Open, which Allen won 9–4. The match was refereed by Kevin Dabrowski. Allen won the opening frame with a 132 break. Zhou won the second, but Allen then made breaks including 72 and 59 as he won four consecutive frames to move 5–1 ahead. Zhou took the seventh, but Allen won frame eight to end the session with a 6–2 lead.

When play resumed for the second session, Zhou won the 45-minute ninth frame, but Allen took the 10th to lead 7–3. Zhou won the next two frames to trail by two at 7–5 at the mid-session interval. Allen made a break of 60 in frame 13 but missed a red, and Zhou made a 72 clearance to win the frame on the last black. Zhou then made a break of 60 to tie the scores at 7–7 and a 53 break to win a fifth consecutive frame and move 8–7 in front. In the 16th frame, Allen made a 71 break, leaving Zhou requiring snookers, but went in-off. Zhou got the required penalty points, but Allen won the frame on the colours to tie the scores at 8–8. Allen then won the decider with a 61 break to secure a 9–8 victory, securing his first English Open title, the 12th ranking title of his professional career, and his first ranking win since February 2024.

Allen won five consecutive matches at the event in deciding frames. Following the 2025 Saudi Arabia Snooker Masters and the 2025 Wuhan Open, it was the first time that three consecutive ranking finals had gone to deciding frames. "I thought Zhou battled really hard in that second session. He played some good stuff," said Allen afterwards. "He put me under pressure. I missed a few balls and I was nervous. I missed a few that I shouldn't have but at 8–7 I suddenly switched on a bit. It's a good trait to have. I don't want to keep relying on it but I felt as good as any part of the match in those last two frames." Allen, who had not won a ranking title since the 2024 Players Championship held the previous February, advanced from 10th to 7th in the world rankings after the tournament. Zhou's defeat meant that he had lost all four of the ranking finals he had contested, two of them to Allen. "Of course it will give me confidence," he said of his performance in the final. "[Allen] was very good in the first session. He was 6–2 up and I think I just wanted to give him some trouble this evening. I'm very happy I managed to get 8–7 up. It is a good experience and I will learn from it."

== Final rounds ==
The draw for the final rounds is shown below. Numbers in parentheses after the players' names denote the top 32 seeded players and players in bold denote match winners.

=== Top half ===
**Last 64**; Best of 7 frames
**Neil Robertson (AUS) (1)**	**4**
Sunny Akani (THA)	1
**Jackson Page (WAL) (32)**	**4**
Zhao Hanyang (CHN)	1
**Shaun Murphy (ENG) (15)**	**4**
Zak Surety (ENG)	0
David Gilbert (ENG) (22)	2
**Fan Zhengyi (CHN)**	**4**
**Wu Yize (CHN) (18)**	**4**
He Guoqiang (CHN)	1
**Chris Wakelin (ENG) (12)**	**4**
Ross Muir (SCO)	1
**Lei Peifan (CHN) (29)**	**4**
Ryan Day (WAL)	1
**Mark Selby (ENG) (8)**	**4**
Liam Highfield (ENG)	1
**Mark Williams (WAL) (5)**	**4**
Amir Sarkhosh (IRN)	0
**Zhou Yuelong (CHN) (30)**	**4**
Xu Si (CHN)	1
**Barry Hawkins (ENG) (10)**	**4**
Louis Heathcote (ENG)	2
**Tom Ford (ENG) (17)**	**4**
Martin O'Donnell (ENG)	3
Hossein Vafaei (IRN) (23)	3
**Luca Brecel (BEL)**	**4**
**Si Jiahui (CHN) (13)**	**4**
Liu Hongyu (CHN) (Note: In the match between Si Jiahui and Liu Hongyu, Liu lost the fifth frame on the three‑miss rule, so that the WST match record shows the frame as a 22–18 points win for Liu.)	2
**Pang Junxu (CHN) (27)**	**4**
Daniel Wells (WAL)	3
Kyren Wilson (ENG) (4)	2
**Robbie Williams (ENG)**	**4**

**Last 32**; Best of 7 frames
(Australia) Neil Robertson (1)	1
**(Wales) Jackson Page (32)**	**4**
**(England) Shaun Murphy (15)**	**4**
(China) Fan Zhengyi	1
**(China) Wu Yize (18)**	**4**
(England) Chris Wakelin (12)	2
(China) Lei Peifan (29)	0
**(England) Mark Selby (8)**	**4**
(Wales) Mark Williams (5)	1
**(China) Zhou Yuelong (30)**	**4**
**(England) Barry Hawkins (10)**	**4**
(England) Tom Ford (17)	0
**(Belgium) Luca Brecel**	**4**
(China) Si Jiahui (13)	2
(China) Pang Junxu (27)	0
**(England) Robbie Williams**	**4**

**Last 16**; Best of 7 frames
**(Wales) Jackson Page (32)**	**4**
(England) Shaun Murphy (15)	3
(China) Wu Yize (18)	2
**(England) Mark Selby (8)**	**4**
**(China) Zhou Yuelong (30)**	**4**
(England) Barry Hawkins (10)	2
**(Belgium) Luca Brecel**	**4**
(England) Robbie Williams (49)	3

**Quarter-finals**; Best of 9 frames
(Wales) Jackson Page (32)	4
**(England) Mark Selby (8)**	**5**
**(China) Zhou Yuelong (30)**	**5**
(Belgium) Luca Brecel	4

**Semi-finals**; Best of 11 frames
(England) Mark Selby (8)	3
**(China) Zhou Yuelong (30)**	**6**

=== Bottom half ===
**Last 64**; Best of 7 frames
**Judd Trump (ENG) (3)**	**4**
Michael Holt (ENG)	0
**Yuan Sijun (CHN) (28)**	**4**
Ben Woollaston (ENG)	3
**Gary Wilson (ENG) (14)**	**4**
Sanderson Lam (ENG)	2
**Elliot Slessor (ENG) (21)**	**4**
Jimmy Robertson (ENG)	2
**Stuart Bingham (ENG) (19)**	**4**
Dylan Emery (WAL)	0
**Mark Allen (NIR) (9)**	**4**
Scott Donaldson (SCO)	1
**Matthew Selt (ENG) (31)**	**4**
Liam Davies (WAL)	2
**Ding Junhui (CHN) (6)**	**4**
Liam Pullen (ENG)	1
**Xiao Guodong (CHN) (7)**	**4**
Gong Chenzhi (CHN)	0
Joe O'Connor (ENG) (25)	1
**Ricky Walden (ENG)**	**4**
**Zhang Anda (CHN) (11)**	**4**
Anthony McGill (SCO)	1
**Jak Jones (WAL) (20)**	**4**
Jamie Jones (WAL)	3
Stephen Maguire (SCO) (24)	2
**Aaron Hill (IRL)**	**4**
**Ali Carter (ENG) (16)**	**4**
Marco Fu (HKG)	2
**Jack Lisowski (ENG) (26)**	**4**
Thepchaiya Un-Nooh (THA)	2
**Zhao Xintong (CHN) (2)**	**4**
Ishpreet Singh Chadha (IND)	0

**Last 32**; Best of 7 frames
**(England) Judd Trump (3)**	**4**
(China) Yuan Sijun (28)	1
(England) Gary Wilson (14)	0
**(England) Elliot Slessor (21)**	**4**
(England) Stuart Bingham (19)	3
**(Northern Ireland) Mark Allen (9)**	**4**
(England) Matthew Selt (31)	1
**(China) Ding Junhui (6)**	**4**
(China) Xiao Guodong (7)	3
**(England) Ricky Walden**	**4**
(China) Zhang Anda (11)	1
**(Wales) Jak Jones (20)**	**4**
**(Republic of Ireland) Aaron Hill**	**4**
(England) Ali Carter (16)	3
**(England) Jack Lisowski (26)**	**4**
(China) Zhao Xintong (2)	1

**Last 16**; Best of 7 frames
(England) Judd Trump (3)	3
**(England) Elliot Slessor (21)**	**4**
**(Northern Ireland) Mark Allen (9)**	**4**
(China) Ding Junhui (6)	3
(England) Ricky Walden	3
**(Wales) Jak Jones (20)**	**4**
**(Republic of Ireland) Aaron Hill**	**4**
(England) Jack Lisowski (26)	1

**Quarter-finals**; Best of 9 frames
(England) Elliot Slessor (21)	4
**(Northern Ireland) Mark Allen (9)**	**5**
**(Wales) Jak Jones (20)**	**5**
(Republic of Ireland) Aaron Hill	2

**Semi-finals**; Best of 11 frames
**(Northern Ireland) Mark Allen (9)**	**6**
(Wales) Jak Jones (20)	5

=== Final: frame scores ===
Final: Best of 17 frames. Referee: Kevin Dabrowski; Brentwood Centre, Brentwood, England, 21 September 2025
Zhou Yuelong (30); China	8–**9**	**Mark Allen** (9); Northern Ireland
Afternoon: 0–**132** (132), **65**–2, 22–**72**, 24–**70**, 13–**68**, 31–**75**, **81**–0, 28–**64**; Evening: **71**–41, 14–**62**, **95**–28, **59**–24, **72**–60, **64**–34, **73**–13, 59–**93**, 0–**70**
(frame 7) 81	Highest break	**132** (frame 1)
0	Century breaks	**1**

== Early rounds ==
The results of the early rounds are shown below. Numbers in parentheses after the players' names denote the players' seeding, an "a" indicates amateur players who were not on the main World Snooker Tour, and players in bold denote match winners.

**Round 1 (Last 128)**; Best of 7 frames
**Sunny Akani (THA) (70)**	**4**
Oliver Brown (ENG) (102)	2
**Zhao Hanyang (CHN) (95)**	**4**
Connor Benzey (ENG) (112)	2
**Haris Tahir (PAK) (79)**	**4**
Michał Szubarczyk (POL) (100)	0
**Julien Leclercq (BEL) (76)**	**4**
Aidan Murphy (ENG) (a)	0
**Farakh Ajaib (PAK) (75)**	**4**
Kreishh Gurbaxani (IND) (104)	1
Chris Totten (SCO) (85)	1
**Ross Muir (SCO) (105)**	**4**
Antoni Kowalski (POL) (67)	1
**Liam Graham (SCO) (106)**	**4**
**Liam Highfield (ENG) (94)**	**4**
Ng On-yee (HKG) (108)	2
**Amir Sarkhosh (IRN) (72)**	**4**
Sahil Nayyar (CAN) (114)	2
**David Grace (ENG) (91)**	**4**
Jonas Luz (BRA) (98)	0
**Louis Heathcote (ENG) (86)**	**4**
Mahmoud El Hareedy (EGY) (122)	1
**Duane Jones (WAL) (66)**	**4**
Patrick Whelan (ENG) (a)	1
Cheung Ka Wai (HKG) (80)	3
**Jimmy White (ENG) (109)**	**4**
**Sam Craigie (ENG) (88)**	**4**
Chatchapong Nasa (THA) (101)	0
Reanne Evans (ENG) (89)	2
**Jiang Jun (CHN) (118)**	**4**
**Huang Jiahao (CHN) (82)**	**4**
Oliver Sykes (ENG) (a)	0

**Round 2 (Last 96)**; Best of 7 frames
David Lilley (ENG) (58)	3
**Sunny Akani (THA) (70)**	**4**
Noppon Saengkham (THA) (33)	2
**Zhao Hanyang (CHN) (95)**	**4**
**Zak Surety (ENG) (60)**	**4**
Haris Tahir (PAK) (79)	3
**Fan Zhengyi (CHN) (48)**	**4**
Julien Leclercq (BEL) (76)	2
**He Guoqiang (CHN) (45)**	**4**
Farakh Ajaib (PAK) (75)	3
Robert Milkins (ENG) (51)	1
**Ross Muir (SCO) (105)**	**4**
**Ryan Day (WAL) (34)**	**4**
Liam Graham (SCO) (106)	0
Oliver Lines (ENG) (63)	3
**Liam Highfield (ENG) (94)**	**4**
Long Zehuang (CHN) (53)	2
**Amir Sarkhosh (IRN) (72)**	**4**
**Xu Si (CHN) (38)**	**4**
David Grace (ENG) (91)	2
Jordan Brown (NIR) (50)	3
**Louis Heathcote (ENG) (86)**	**4**
**Martin O'Donnell (ENG) (41)**	**4**
Duane Jones (WAL) (66)	0
**Luca Brecel (BEL) (39)**	**4**
Jimmy White (ENG) (109)	1
**Liu Hongyu (CHN) (54)**	**4**
Sam Craigie (ENG) (88)	0
**Daniel Wells (WAL) (44)**	**4**
Jiang Jun (CHN) (118)	2
**Robbie Williams (ENG) (49)**	**4**
Huang Jiahao (CHN) (82)	1

**Round 1 (Last 128)**; Best of 7 frames
Robbie McGuigan (NIR) (81)	2
**Mink Nutcharut (THA) (103)**	**4**
Bulcsú Révész (HUN) (78)	3
**Alexander Ursenbacher (SUI) (110)**	**4**
**Mitchell Mann (ENG) (87)**	**4**
Ian Burns (ENG) (117)	3
**Wang Yuchen (HKG) (68)**	**4**
Florian Nüßle (AUT) (119)	3
**Dylan Emery (WAL) (90)**	**4**
Fergal Quinn (NIR) (111)	0
**Allan Taylor (ENG) (69)**	**4**
Umut Dikme (GER) (a)	3
**Liam Davies (WAL) (74)**	**4**
Hatem Yassen (EGY) (99)	1
Lan Yuhao (CHN) (92)	1
**Liam Pullen (ENG) (107)**	**4**
**Chang Bingyu (CHN) (73)**	**4**
Leone Crowley (IRL) (113)	0
**Bai Yulu (CHN) (93)**	**4**
Liu Wenwei (CHN) (116)	3
Steven Hallworth (ENG) (83)	3
**Mateusz Baranowski (POL) (120)**	**4**
**Iulian Boiko (UKR) (84)**	**4**
Xu Yichen (CHN) (121)	0
Artemijs Žižins (LAT) (71)	3
**Yao Pengcheng (CHN) (115)**	**4**
**Marco Fu (HKG) (96)**	**4**
Gao Yang (CHN) (97)	0
**Haydon Pinhey (ENG) (77)**	**4**
Ryan Davies (ENG) (a)	1
**Ben Mertens (BEL) (65)**	**4**
Ashley Hugill (ENG) (a)	0

**Round 2 (Last 96)**; Best of 7 frames
**Michael Holt (ENG) (62)**	**4**
Mink Nutcharut (THA) (103)	0
**Ben Woollaston (ENG) (36)**	**4**
Alexander Ursenbacher (SUI) (110)	2
**Sanderson Lam (ENG) (59)**	**4**
Mitchell Mann (ENG) (87)	3
**Jimmy Robertson (ENG) (35)**	**4**
Wang Yuchen (HKG) (68)	3
Matthew Stevens (WAL) (47)	3
**Dylan Emery (WAL) (90)**	**4**
**Scott Donaldson (SCO) (52)**	**4**
Allan Taylor (ENG) (69)	3
Lyu Haotian (CHN) (37)	2
**Liam Davies (WAL) (74)**	**4**
Stan Moody (ENG) (55)	1
**Liam Pullen (ENG) (107)**	**4**
**Gong Chenzhi (CHN) (64)**	**4**
Chang Bingyu (CHN) (73)	2
**Ricky Walden (ENG) (40)**	**4**
Bai Yulu (CHN) (93)	1
**Anthony McGill (SCO) (56)**	**4**
Mateusz Baranowski (POL) (120)	1
**Jamie Jones (WAL) (46)**	**4**
Iulian Boiko (UKR) (84)	3
**Aaron Hill (IRL) (43)**	**4**
Yao Pengcheng (CHN) (115)	2
Mark Davis (ENG) (57)	0
**Marco Fu (HKG) (96)**	**4**
**Thepchaiya Un-Nooh (THA) (42)**	**4**
Haydon Pinhey (ENG) (77)	1
**Ishpreet Singh Chadha (IND) (61)**	**4**
Ben Mertens (BEL) (65)	1

== Century breaks ==
A total of 82 century breaks were made in the tournament.

- 147, 123 – Aaron Hill
- 147, 118 – Ali Carter
- 143 – Thepchaiya Un-Nooh
- 140, 135, 133, 125, 102 – Shaun Murphy
- 137 – Ng On-yee
- 136, 113 – Zhou Yuelong
- 136, 105, 102 – Neil Robertson
- 136, 100 – Haydon Pinhey
- 135, 111 – Scott Donaldson
- 135 – Barry Hawkins
- 135 – Duane Jones
- 134, 133, 133 – Chang Bingyu
- 134, 110, 105 – Zhao Xintong
- 133, 105 – Xiao Guodong
- 132, 118, 102 – Mark Allen
- 131, 119, 111, 103, 101 – Mark Selby
- 131 – Mateusz Baranowski
- 130, 113 – Ding Junhui
- 130, 109 – Dylan Emery
- 130, 107, 101 – Judd Trump
- 129 – Anthony McGill
- 128, 103 – Florian Nüßle
- 128 – Jack Lisowski
- 127, 100 – Haris Tahir
- 127 – Louis Heathcote
- 125, 101 – Huang Jiahao
- 118, 103 – Fan Zhengyi
- 117 – David Grace
- 117 – Yuan Sijun
- 116, 106 – Michael Holt
- 116, 103 – Stuart Bingham
- 115, 104 – Julien Leclercq
- 115 – Liam Highfield
- 114 – Ross Muir
- 112 – Wu Yize
- 111, 100 – Jak Jones
- 110, 110, 104 – Marco Fu
- 108 – Kyren Wilson
- 107 – Sunny Akani
- 106 – Chris Wakelin
- 105 – Tom Ford
- 104 – Farakh Ajaib
- 104 – Elliot Slessor
- 102 – Mark Williams
- 101 – Sanderson Lam
- 100 – Jiang Jun
