= 2027 Masters (snooker) =

Snooker tournament

2027 Johnstone's Paint Masters
- Part of the snooker Triple Crown

Tournament information
- Dates: 10–17 January 2027
- Venue: Alexandra Palace
- City: London
- Country: England
- Organisation: World Snooker Tour
- Format: Non-ranking event
- Defending champion: Kyren Wilson (ENG)

The 2027 Masters (officially the 2027 Johnstone's Paint Masters) is an upcoming professional non-ranking snooker tournament that will take place from 10 to 17 January 2027 at Alexandra Palace in London, England. The second Triple Crown event of the 2026–27 snooker season, following the 2026 UK Championship and preceding the 2027 World Championship, the tournament will be the 53rd edition of the Masters, which was first held in 1975.

Kyren Wilson will be the defending champion, having defeated John Higgins 10–6 in the 2026 final.

== Overview ==
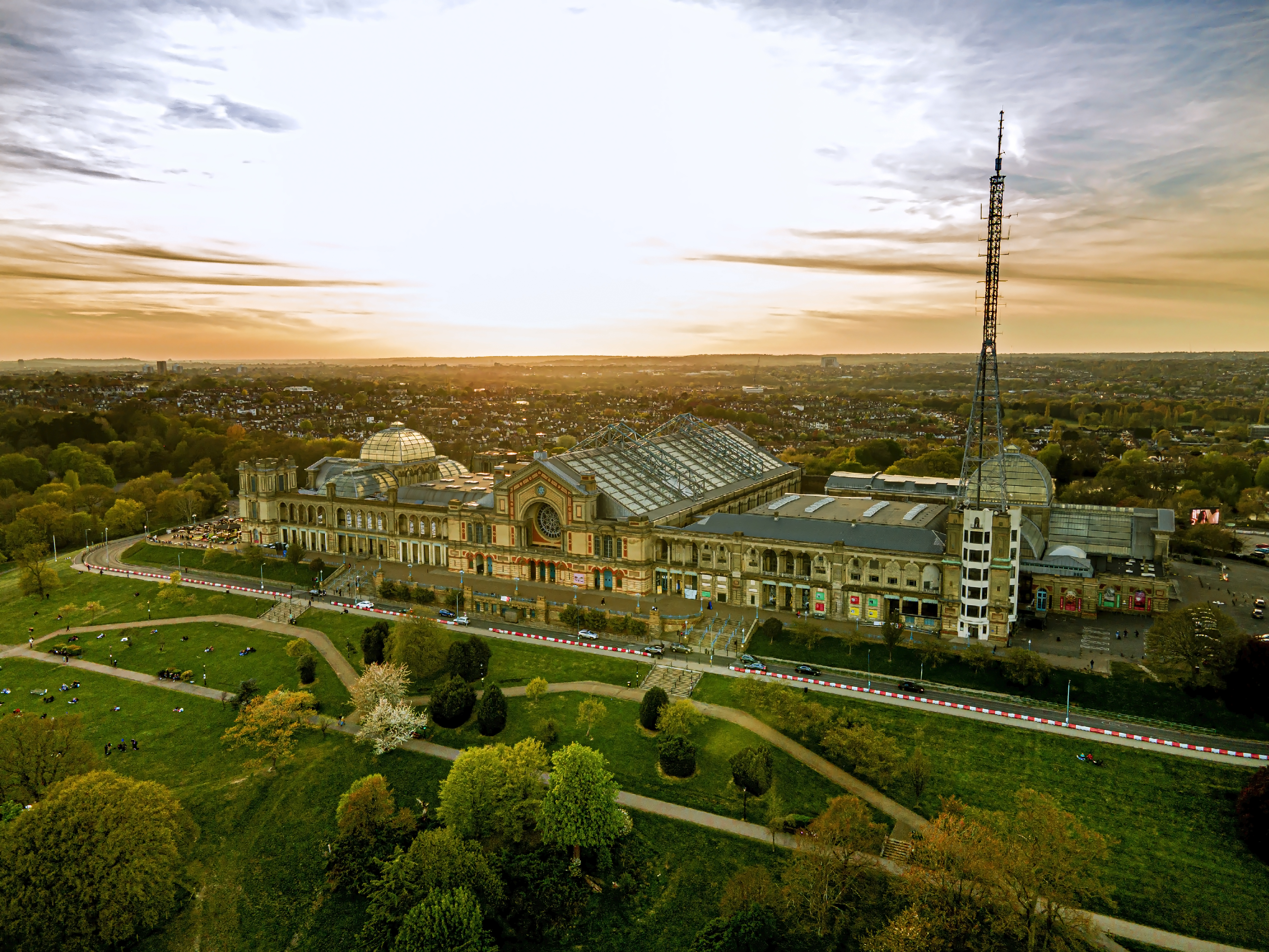
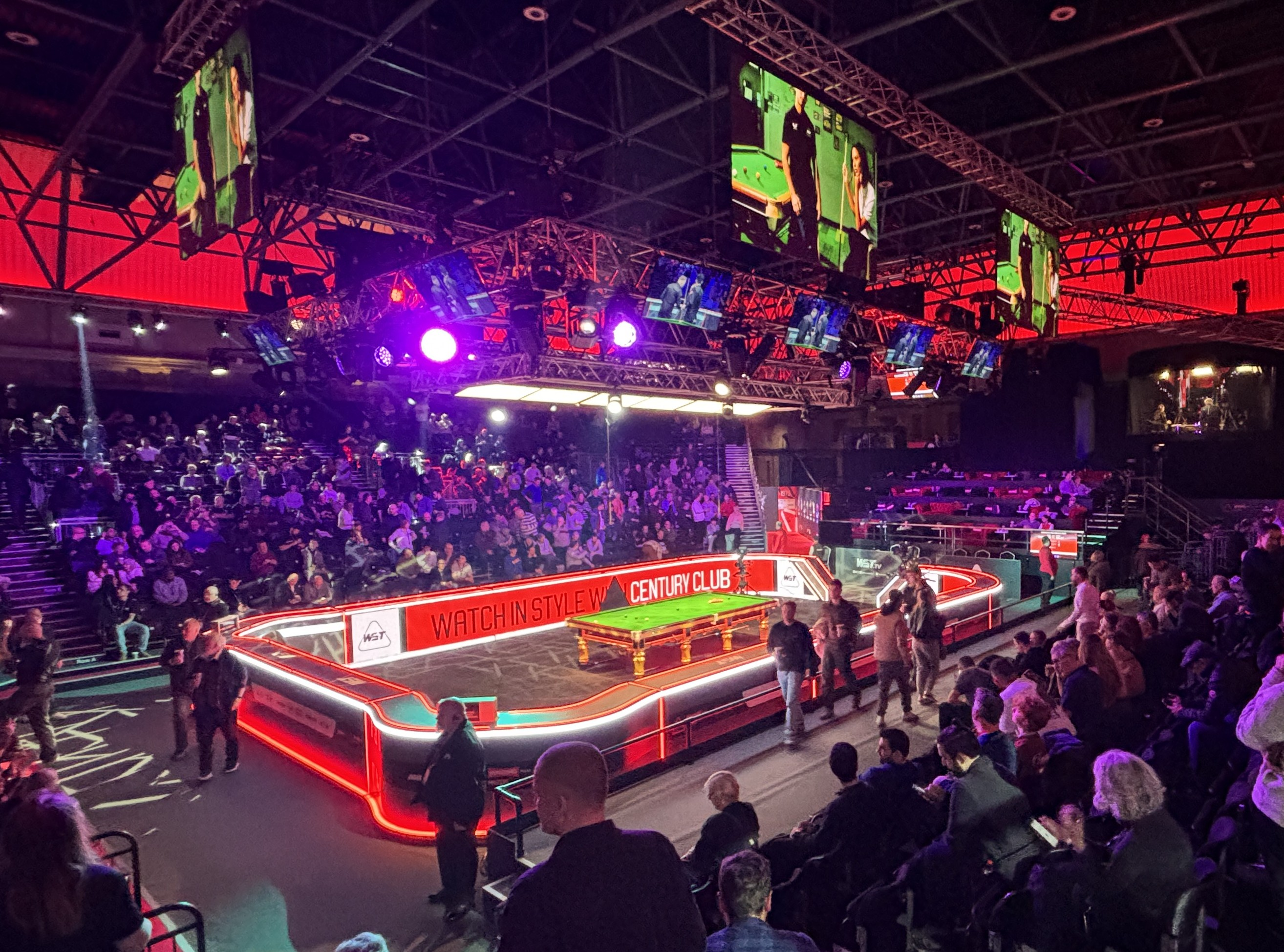
The event will be held at Alexandra Palace in London, shown here from outside and during the 2026 edition.

The Masters was first held in 1975 for 10 invited players at the West Centre Hotel in London. John Spencer won the inaugural event, defeating Ray Reardon on a re-spotted black in the deciding frame of the final. The second-oldest professional snooker tournament, after the World Championship, the Masters has been staged at Alexandra Palace since 2012. In 2016, the Masters trophy was renamed the Paul Hunter Trophy to honour the late three-time champion, who won the title in 2001, 2002, and 2004 before dying of cancer in 2006, aged 27. As of the 2026 edition, Ronnie O'Sullivan was the most successful player in the tournament's history, having won the title eight times. He was both the youngest and oldest Masters champion, having won his first title in 1995, aged 19, and his eighth title in 2024, aged 48.

The 2027 edition of the tournament—the 53rd consecutive staging since its inaugural edition in 1975—will take place from 10 to 17 January at Alexandra Palace in London, England. It will be the second Triple Crown event of the 2026–27 snooker season, following the 2026 UK Championship and preceding the 2027 World Championship. It will be sponsored by Johnstone's Paint. Kyren Wilson is the defending champion, having defeated John Higgins 10–6 in the 2026 final to win his first Masters title.
