= Liam Davies (snooker player) =

Welsh professional snooker player (born 2006)

Personal information
- Born: 28 June 2006 (age 20)

Sport
- Country: Wales
- Sport: Snooker
- Professional: 2024–present
- Highest ranking: 73 (September 2025)
- Current ranking: 77 (as of 7 November 2026)
- Best ranking finish: Quarter-final (2026 English Open)

Liam Davies (born 28 June 2006) is a Welsh professional snooker player.

== Career ==
At the 2019 Snooker Shoot Out, he became the youngest player to compete in a ranking event, at just 12 years old.

Competing at the 2022 World Snooker Championship, Davies was the youngest player to win a match at the event, at 15 years and 277 days old. In addition to defeating Aaron Hill, Davies defeated Fergal O'Brien before losing on a deciding frame to Jordan Brown in the penultimate qualifying round.

As a result of high placing on the 2020–21 Q Tour, he was allowed to play in qualification events for the professional 2021–22 snooker season. In August 2022, Davies won three back-to-back junior world events, defeating Bulcsú Révész in the Under-16 championship and Antoni Kowalski in the Under-18 and Under-21 categories. He became the first player to win all three titles in a single year. Davies, who is partially deaf, is coached by Lee Walker.

== Performance and rankings timeline ==
Tournament	2018/ 19	2021/ 22	2022/ 23	2023/ 24	2024/ 25	2025/ 26	2026/ 27
Ranking (Note: It shows the ranking at the beginning of the season.)	(Note: He was an amateur)				(Note: New players on the Main Tour don't have a ranking)	76	(Note: Players qualified through Q School started the season without prize money ranking points)
Ranking tournaments
Championship League	NR	A	A	A	RR	2R	RR
China Open	A	Tournament Not Held					LQ
Wuhan Open	Not Held			A	LQ	1R	2R
British Open	NH	A	A	A	2R	3R	2R
English Open	A	A	A	A	LQ	1R	QF
Shenzhen Open (Note: The event was called the Xi'an Grand Prix (2024/2025–2025/2026))	Tournament Not Held				LQ	LQ	LQ
Northern Ireland Open	A	A	A	A	LQ	LQ	2R
International Championship	A	Not Held		A	LQ	LQ	3R
UK Championship	A	A	LQ	LQ	LQ	LQ	
Shoot Out	1R	1R	A	4R	3R	2R	
Scottish Open	A	A	A	A	LQ	LQ	
German Masters	A	A	A	A	LQ	LQ	LQ
Welsh Open	A	LQ	1R	1R	1R	LQ	
World Grand Prix	DNQ	DNQ	DNQ	DNQ	DNQ	DNQ	
Players Championship	DNQ	DNQ	DNQ	DNQ	DNQ	DNQ	
World Open	A	Not Held		A	LQ	LQ	
Tour Championship	DNQ	DNQ	DNQ	DNQ	DNQ	DNQ	
World Championship	A	LQ	LQ	LQ	LQ	LQ	
Former ranking tournaments
Saudi Arabia Masters	Tournament Not Held				2R	2R	NH

Performance Table Legend
LQ	lost in the qualifying draw	#R	lost in the early rounds of the tournament (WR = Wildcard round, RR = Round robin)	QF	lost in the quarter-finals
SF	lost in the semi-finals	F	lost in the final	W	won the tournament
DNQ	did not qualify for the tournament	A	did not participate in the tournament	WD	withdrew from the tournament

NH / Not Held	means an event was not held.
NR / Non-Ranking Event	means an event is/was no longer a ranking event.
R / Ranking Event	means an event is/was a ranking event.
MR / Minor-Ranking Event	means an event is/was a minor-ranking event.
PA / Pro-am Event	means an event is/was a pro=am event.

== Career finals ==
=== Amateur finals: 21 (17 titles) ===
Outcome	No.	Year	Championship	Opponent in the final	Score
Winner	1.	2019	Welsh Under-14 Championship	(Wales) Oliver Briffett-Payne	3–0
Winner	2.	2019	Welsh Under-16 Championship	(Wales) Oliver Briffett-Payne	3–0
Winner	3.	2019	Welsh Under-18 Championship	(Wales) Conor Caniff	3–0
Runner-up	1.	2019	Welsh Under-21 Championship	(Wales) Tyler Rees	0–3
Winner	4.	2020	Welsh Under-14 Championship	(Wales) Riley Powell	3–0
Winner	5.	2020	Welsh Under-16 Championship	(Wales) Oliver Briffett-Payne	3–2
Winner	6.	2020	Welsh Under-18 Championship	(Wales) Luke James	3–2
Runner-up	2.	2020	Welsh Under-21 Championship	(Wales) Dylan Emery	0–3
Winner	7.	2022	Welsh Under-18 Championship	(Wales) Riley Powell	3–1
Winner	8.	2022	Welsh Under-21 Championship	(Wales) Brad Ferguson	3–1
Winner	9.	2022	EBSA European Under-18 Snooker Championships	(Republic of Ireland) Leone Crowley	4–1
Runner-up	3.	2022	Welsh Amateur Championship	(Wales) Darren Morgan	2–8
Winner	10.	2022	World Open Under-16 Snooker Championships	(Hungary) Bulcsú Révész	4–2
Winner	11.	2022	IBSF World Under-18 Snooker Championship	(Poland) Antoni Kowalski	4–3
Winner	12.	2022	IBSF World Under-21 Snooker Championship	(Poland) Antoni Kowalski	5–1
Winner	13.	2023	Welsh Under-21 Championship	(Wales) Riley Powell	3–0
Winner	14.	2023	IBSF World Under-17 Snooker Championship	(Wales) Riley Powell	4–0
Winner	15.	2023	IBSF World Under-21 Snooker Championship	(Germany) Alexander Widau	5–2
Winner	16.	2023	Q Tour – Event 1	(England) Craig Steadman	5–2
Runner-up	4	2023	Q Tour – Event 2	(England) Michael Holt	2–5
Winner	17.	2024	EBSA European Under-21 Snooker Championships	(Poland) Antoni Kowalski	5–3
