= Riley Powell =

Welsh snooker player (born 2008)

Personal information
- Born: 27 August 2008 (age 18) Tredegar, Wales

Sport
- Country: Wales
- Sport: Snooker

Riley Powell (born 27 August 2008) is a Welsh snooker player. In 2025, he won the Six-red World Championship.

== Early life ==
Powell was raised in Tredegar in Blaenau Gwent, Wales, with his mum Emma, dad Stephen, and his brother and sister. He attended Tredegar Comprehensive School. He began to practise snooker at the nearby Mark Williams' Snooker Club at the age of seven years-old and he would have to wear polystyrene shoes to help him reach parts of the table. He practises regularly with Williams and fellow Welsh professional player Jackson Page.

== Career ==
=== 2022-23 ===
Powell reached the last 16 of the World Under-18 Championship in 2022. Aged 14 years-old, Powell defeated world number eight Kyren Wilson in the Snooker Shoot Out in January 2023. He became the second youngest player to win a match at the tournament after fellow 14 year-old, Vladislav Gradinari, of Moldova. He was defeated in the last-64 by Tom Ford. Powell won the Welsh under-16 title in May 2023.

=== 2023-24 ===
In November 2023, Powell was granted a place at the 2023 UK Championship held at the York Barbican where he lost in the first round of qualifying to professional Rory Thor. In March 2024, he was runner-up at the 2024 European Under 16 Championship after facing Vladislav Gradinari in the final.

Powell entered Q School in May 2024. In the first event, he recorded a victory over Peter Lines, 39 years his senior, but was defeated in the next round by Alex Clenshaw. At the second event he was defeated by the experienced James Cahill.

=== 2024-25 ===
In October 2024, he was awarded a wildcard to compete at the Snooker Shoot Out where he recorded a win over fellow youngster Stan Moody with a dramatic late pot. He reached the quarter-final of the WSF Junior Snooker World Championship in Morocco in January 2025.

He competed at Q school in May 2025 where he was defeated in the second event by former professional Andrew Pagett. In July 2025, he was runner-up in the U17 Six Red Championships. The following week, he won the senior IBSF Six-red World Championship with a win over Pankaj Advani in the final.

=== 2025-26 ===
On 11 December he recorded a win against Daniel Wells at the 2025 Snooker Shoot Out. In January 2026, he was a quarter-finalist again at the WSF Junior Snooker Championship, in Bulgaria. In March 2026, Powell was runner-up to Ukrainian Anton Kazakov in the final of the EBSA U21 Championships. In May 2026, he entered Q School with his performances including a 4-0 win over Velian Dimitrov and 4-2 over Kaylan Patel. In event two he defeated Neal Jones and former professionals Robbie McGuigan, and Haydon Pinhey before losing the penultimate round to Yadan Bodor.

=== 2026-27 ===
On 25 October 2026, Powell won his first WPBSA Q Tour Europe event, recording a 4-0 win over Peter Lines in the semi-final and having a 4-1 win over Mark Lloyd in the final of the third Q Tour event of the season, held in Oberhausen, Germany. The following month, he defeated compatriot Jamie Clarke in the first qualifying round at the 2026 UK Championship.

== Career finals ==
=== Amateur finals: 3 (2 titles) ===
Outcome	No.	Year	Championship	Opponent in the final	Score
Winner	1.	2025	IBSF Six-red World Championship	(India) Pankaj Advani	5–4
Runner-up	1.	2026	European Under-21 Championship	(Ukraine) Anton Kazakov	3–5
Winner	2.	2026	Q Tour – Event 3	(England) Mark Lloyd	4–1
