= Anton Kazakov =

Ukrainian snooker player

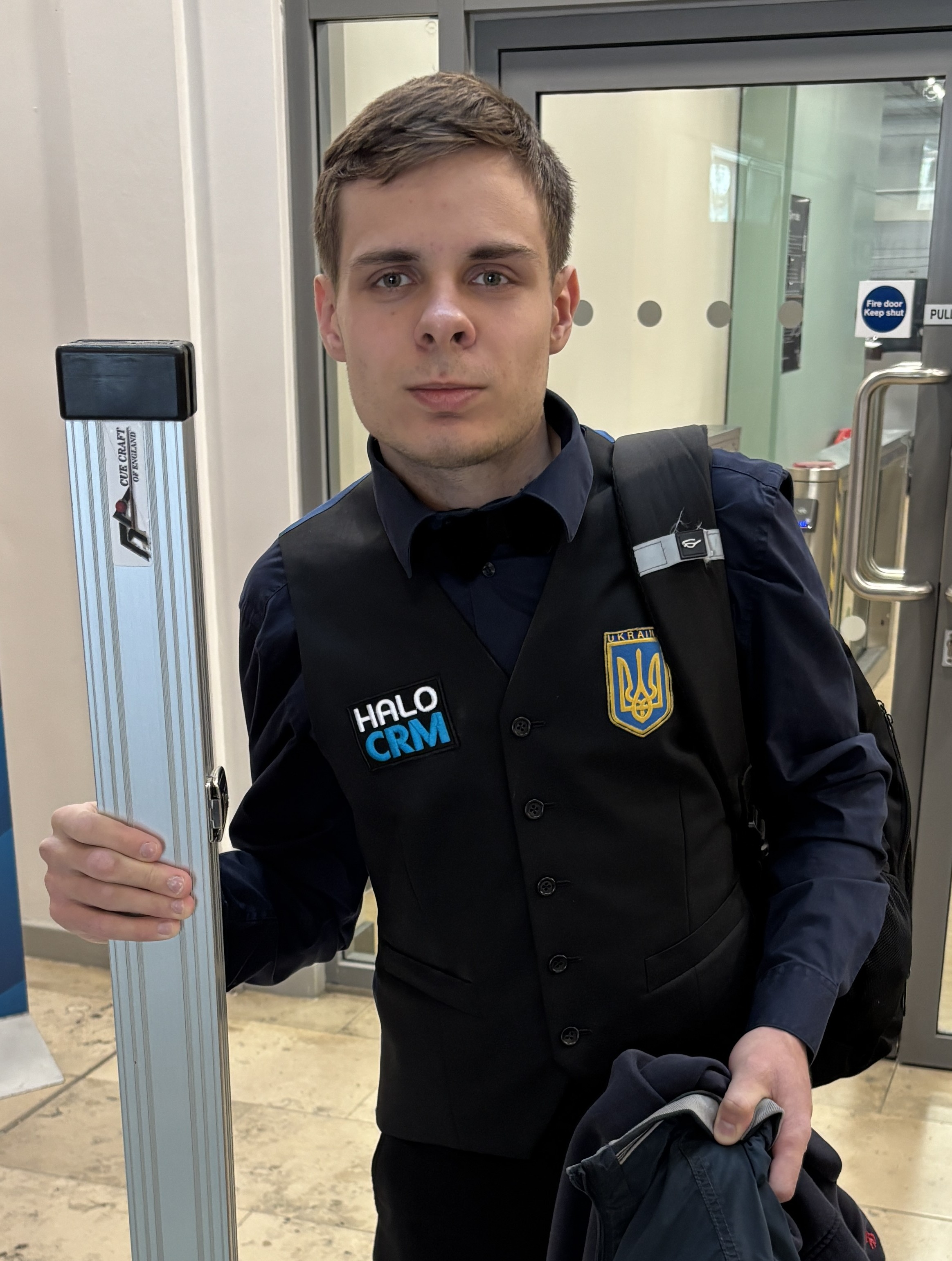

Personal information
- Born: 8 November 2004 (age 22) Dnipro

Sport
- Country: Ukraine
- Sport: Snooker
- Professional: 2022–2024, 2026–present
- Highest ranking: 101 (August 2023)
- Current ranking: 113 (as of 7 November 2026)
- Best ranking finish: Last 64 (2023 Northern Ireland Open)

Anton Oleksandrovich Kazakov (Ukrainian: Антон Олександрович Казаков; born 8 November 2004) is a Ukrainian professional snooker player.

== Career ==
Kazakov turned professional in 2022 after winning the WSF Junior Championship and gained a two-year tour card for the 2022–23 and 2023–24 snooker seasons.

== Performance and rankings timeline ==
Tournament	2021/ 22	2022/ 23	2023/ 24	2024/ 25	2025/ 26	2026/ 27
Ranking	(Note: He was an amateur)	(Note: New players on the Main Tour don't have a ranking)	92			
Ranking tournaments
Championship League	A	RR	RR	RR	A	RR
China Open	Tournament Not Held					LQ
Wuhan Open	Not Held		LQ	A	A	LQ
British Open	A	LQ	LQ	1R	A	LQ
English Open	A	LQ	LQ	LQ	A	LQ
Shenzhen Open (Note: The event was called the Xi'an Grand Prix (2024/2025–2025/2026))	Not Held			A	A	LQ
Northern Ireland Open	A	LQ	1R	LQ	A	LQ
International Championship	Not Held		LQ	A	A	1R
UK Championship	A	LQ	LQ	LQ	A	
Shoot Out	A	1R	1R	1R	A	
Scottish Open	A	LQ	LQ	LQ	A	LQ
German Masters	A	LQ	LQ	LQ	A	
Welsh Open	A	LQ	LQ	LQ	A	
World Grand Prix	DNQ	DNQ	DNQ	DNQ	DNQ	
Players Championship	DNQ	DNQ	DNQ	DNQ	DNQ	
World Open	Not Held		LQ	A	A	
Tour Championship	DNQ	DNQ	DNQ	DNQ	DNQ	
World Championship	LQ	LQ	LQ	LQ	LQ	
Former ranking tournaments
WST Classic	NH	1R	Tournament Not Held			
European Masters	A	LQ	LQ	Not Held		
Saudi Arabia Masters	Not Held			A	A	NH
Former non-ranking tournaments
Six-red World Championship	NH	LQ	Tournament Not Held			

Performance Table Legend
LQ	lost in the qualifying draw	#R	lost in the early rounds of the tournament (WR = Wildcard round, RR = Round robin)	QF	lost in the quarter-finals
SF	lost in the semi-finals	F	lost in the final	W	won the tournament
DNQ	did not qualify for the tournament	A	did not participate in the tournament	WD	withdrew from the tournament

NH / Not Held	means an event was not held
NR / Non-Ranking Event	means an event is/was no longer a ranking event
R / Ranking Event	means an event is/was a ranking event
MR / Minor-Ranking Event	means an event is/was a minor-ranking event
PA / Pro-am Event	means an event is/was a pro-am event

== Career finals ==
=== Amateur finals: 6 (4 title) ===
Outcome	No.	Year	Championship	Opponent in the final	Score
Winner	1.	2019	Ukrainian Amateur Championship	(Ukraine) Vladyslav Vyshnevskyy	4–0
Runner-up	1.	2020	Ukrainian Amateur Championship	(Ukraine) Denis Khmelevskiy	2–4
Runner-up	2.	2021	Ukrainian Amateur Championship	(Ukraine) Vladyslav Vyshnevskyy	1–4
Winner	2.	2022	WSF Junior Championship	(England) Jake Crofts	5–3
Winner	3.	2026	EBSA European Under-21 Snooker Championship	(Wales) Riley Powell	5–3
Winner	4.	2026	EBSA European Snooker Championship	(England) Oliver Sykes	5–4

=== Team finals: 1 (1 title) ===
Outcome	No.	Year	Championship	Team/Partner	Opponent(s) in the final	Score	Ref.
Winner	1.	2025	EBSA European Team Snooker Championship	Ukraine; Mykhailo Larkov	Malta 3 Philip Ciantar; Isaac Borg	3–1	
