= Paul Norris (snooker player) =

English snooker player (born 1966)

Personal information
- Born: 2 August 1966 (age 60)

Sport
- Country: England
- Sport: Snooker
- Professional: 2026–present
- Highest ranking: 125 (July 2026)
- Current ranking: 127 (as of 7 November 2026)

Paul Norris (born 2 August 1966) is an English professional snooker player. He won a two-year card for the World Snooker Tour from the 2026–27 season. He qualified for the main tour at 59 years old, and is currently the oldest snooker player to turn professional.

== Career ==
From the Midlands, Norris moved to Sussex in the 1990s, initially in Haywards Heath and Crawley before settling in Brighton. He competed in amateur snooker competitions during his stay in Brighton, where wins in local leagues across England earned him a place to represent England in senior's snooker in 2005. Norris then emigrated to Australia to live with his partner, Jessica Woods, a nine-time Australian women's snooker champion whom he met during a snooker competition in Egypt.

Norris participated in the 2026 Asia-Pacific Snooker Championship as a first-timer, with the venue being at his local snooker club in Albury, where he eventually beat Vinnie Calabrese 6–5 in the final and won a two-year card on the World Snooker Tour from the 2026–27 snooker season. Speaking to The Argus as he returned to Brighton, he compared himself on tour as "the equivalent of a 39-year-old non-league player signing for Arsenal".

Upon turning professional, Norris has moved back to England and practises at the Castle Snooker Club in Brighton.

== Personal life ==
He was trained as a classical actor from the London Academy of Music and Dramatic Art.

== Performance and rankings timeline ==
Tournament	2016/ 17	2026/ 27
Ranking (Note: It shows the ranking at the beginning of the season)	(Note: He was an amateur)	(Note: New players on the Main Tour don't have a ranking)
Ranking tournaments
Championship League	NR	RR
China Open	A	LQ
Wuhan Open	NH	LQ
British Open	NH	LQ
English Open	A	LQ
Shenzhen Open	NH	LQ
Northern Ireland Open	A	LQ
International Championship	A	LQ
UK Championship	A	LQ
Shoot Out	A	
Scottish Open	A	LQ
German Masters	A	LQ
Welsh Open	A	
World Grand Prix	DNQ	
Players Championship	DNQ	
World Open	NH	
Tour Championship	NH	
World Championship	A	
Non-ranking tournaments
Paul Hunter Classic	LQ	NH

Performance Table Legend
LQ	lost in the qualifying draw	#R	lost in the early rounds of the tournament (WR = Wildcard round, RR = Round robin)	QF	lost in the quarter-finals
SF	lost in the semi-finals	F	lost in the final	W	won the tournament
DNQ	did not qualify for the tournament	A	did not participate in the tournament	WD	withdrew from the tournament

NH / Not Held	means an event was not held
NR / Non-Ranking Event	means an event is/was no longer a ranking event
R / Ranking Event	means an event is/was a ranking event
MR / Minor-Ranking Event	means an event is/was a minor-ranking event

== Career finals ==
=== Amateur finals: 1 (1 titles) ===
Outcome	No.	Year	Championship	Opponent in the final	Score
Winner	1.	2026	Asia Pacific Championship	(Australia) Vinnie Calabrese	6–5
