= 2025–26 snooker world rankings =

Preceded by 2024–25	2025–26	Succeeded by 2026–27

The sport of professional snooker has had a world ranking system in place since 1976. Certain tournaments were given "ranking" status, with the results at those events contributing to a player's world ranking. The events that made up the 1976–77 snooker season were the first to award players with ranking points. Originally, the world rankings were decided based only on results in the World Snooker Championship, but other events were later added. The system used for the 2024–25 snooker season was first used in the 2010–11 season, where players won ranking points based entirely on prize money won from these events. The rankings are based on the prior two seasons, with eight revisions after specific tournaments throughout the season. These revisions are used as official rankings, with points awarded in the current season overwriting those from two years prior.

Judd Trump began the season as the highest ranked player and held it throughout the 2025–26 snooker season.

== Ranking list ==
=== Revision dates ===
Seedings for each event were based on the world rankings, with totals being updated at specific revision dates. On these dates, ranking points from the 2023–24 snooker season were removed from a player's total.

Revision dates
Revision point	Date	After	2023/2024 points dropped
1	24 July 2025	Championship League	Championship League
2	17 August 2025	Saudi Arabia Masters	—
3	31 August 2025	Wuhan Open	European Masters
4	22 September 2025	English Open	British Open
5	29 September 2025	British Open	English Open
6	14 October 2025	Xi'an Grand Prix	Wuhan Open
7	27 October 2025	Northern Ireland Open	Northern Ireland Open
8	10 November 2025	International Championship	International Championship
9	8 December 2025	UK Championship	UK Championship
10	14 December 2025	Shoot Out	Shoot Out
11	22 December 2025	Scottish Open	Scottish Open
12	2 February 2026	German Masters	World Grand Prix
13	9 February 2026	World Grand Prix	German Masters
14	23 February 2026	Players Championship	Welsh Open
15	2 March 2026	Welsh Open	Players Championship
16	23 March 2026	World Open	World Open
17	6 April 2026	Tour Championship	Tour Championship
Total	5 May 2026	World Championship	World Championship

=== Seeding list ===
The following table contains the rankings during the 2025–26 snooker season; blank fields indicate that the player had no ranking.

Name	Seeding revisions											
Name	0 (Note: Rankings after World Championship.)	1 (Note: Rankings after Saudi Arabia Masters.)	2 (Note: Rankings after Wuhan Open.)	3 (Note: Rankings after English Open.)	4 (Note: Rankings after British Open.)	5 (Note: Rankings after International Championship.)	6 (Note: Rankings after UK Championship.)	7 (Note: Rankings after Shoot Out.)	8 (Note: Rankings after Scottish Open.)	9 (Note: Rankings after German Masters.)	10 (Note: Rankings after Tour Championship.)	11 (Note: Rankings after World Championship.)
Judd Trump (ENG)	1	1	1	1	1	1	1	1	1	1	1	1
Kyren Wilson (ENG)	2	2	2	2	2	2	2	2	2	2	2	8
Mark Williams (WAL)	3	5	5	5	5	4	4	4	4	4	6	7
John Higgins (SCO)	4	6	6	6	6	6	5	5	5	5	5	5
Ronnie O'Sullivan (ENG)	5	4	4	4	4	5	8	8	8	11	12	14
Ding Junhui (CHN)	6	7	7	8	8	8	12	12	12	12	16	15
Mark Selby (ENG)	7	9	9	10	10	11	6	6	6	6	7	9
Neil Robertson (AUS)	8	3	3	3	3	3	3	3	3	3	3	2
Barry Hawkins (ENG)	9	8	12	12	13	14	14	14	15	14	11	10
Mark Allen (NIR)	10	11	10	7	7	7	9	10	10	9	14	12
Zhao Xintong (CHN)	11	10	11	11	11	10	10	9	9	8	4	3
Zhang Anda (CHN)	12	12	13	13	14	23	23	23	23	23	22	20
Xiao Guodong (CHN)	13	14	8	9	9	12	11	11	11	10	9	11
Shaun Murphy (ENG)	14	16	17	16	12	9	7	7	7	7	8	6
Si Jiahui (CHN)	15	15	15	15	16	16	15	15	16	16	15	16
Chris Wakelin (ENG)	16	13	14	14	15	17	17	17	14	15	13	13
Ali Carter (ENG)	17	17	18	18	18	19	20	20	21	20	23	22
Gary Wilson (ENG)	18	18	16	17	17	15	16	16	17	18	27	24
Tom Ford (ENG)	19	20	19	21	22	26	26	26	28	28	33	36
Wu Yize (CHN)	20	19	20	19	20	13	13	13	13	13	10	4
Jak Jones (WAL)	21	22	22	20	19	18	18	19	19	19	19	32
Stuart Bingham (ENG)	22	21	21	22	21	20	19	18	18	17	17	21
David Gilbert (ENG)	23	24	24	24	24	24	24	24	24	24	25	31
Hossein Vafaei (IRN)	24	25	25	26	26	27	32	32	32	32	32	28
Jack Lisowski (ENG)	25	28	28	29	29	22	22	22	22	22	18	17
Pang Junxu (CHN)	26	29	29	28	28	30	27	27	27	27	29	25
Stephen Maguire (SCO)	27	26	26	25	25	25	25	25	25	25	26	29
Joe O'Connor (ENG)	28	27	27	27	27	28	28	28	26	26	28	27
Elliot Slessor (ENG)	29	23	23	23	23	21	21	21	20	21	21	19
Yuan Sijun (CHN)	30	30	30	31	31	32	31	31	31	31	31	30
Lei Peifan (CHN)	31	31	31	32	32	31	30	30	29	29	30	26
Zhou Yuelong (CHN)	32	32	32	30	30	29	29	29	30	30	24	23
Noppon Saengkham (THA)	33	33	35	36	35	35	35	35	38	40	45	46
Matthew Selt (ENG)	34	34	33	34	34	36	39	38	37	37	37	43
Jimmy Robertson (ENG)	35	36	37	37	37	34	34	34	34	33	34	33
Jackson Page (WAL)	36	35	34	33	33	33	33	33	33	34	36	35
Ryan Day (WAL)	37	37	36	35	36	38	36	36	35	35	35	37
Lyu Haotian (CHN)	38	39	39	43	41	48	47	47	51	54	54	61
Luca Brecel (BEL)	39	40	41	38	40	40	43	43	43	43	46	44
Ricky Walden (ENG)	40	41	42	40	42	46	45	45	48	49	52	54
Xu Si (CHN)	41	42	40	41	39	39	38	39	39	38	38	34
Ben Woollaston (ENG)	42	38	38	39	38	37	37	37	36	36	39	39
Martin O'Donnell (ENG)	43	43	43	42	43	44	44	44	47	45	55	52
Daniel Wells (WAL)	44	45	46	46	47	41	40	40	41	39	41	45
He Guoqiang (CHN)	45	46	47	48	52	47	46	46	44	44	47	47
Thepchaiya Un-Nooh (THA)	46	44	44	44	44	42	42	41	40	41	20	18
Robbie Williams (ENG)	47	49	51	49	50	55	55	55	55	55	53	56
Fan Zhengyi (CHN)	48	51	50	52	55	57	57	56	56	56	63	57
Robert Milkins (ENG)	49	53	53	56	56	56	56	58	57	57	61	72
Aaron Hill (IRL)	50	47	45	45	46	43	42	42	42	42	40	41
Jamie Jones (WAL)	51	48	48	47	48	58	59	59	60	61	60	63
Matthew Stevens (WAL)	52	50	49	50	51	49	49	49	49	48	48	49
Jordan Brown (NIR)	53	52	52	51	53	64	62	63	64	65	67	64
Mark Davis (ENG)	54	56	59	59	59	61	63	64	63	64	64	66
Scott Donaldson (SCO)	55	57	54	58	57	52	51	51	53	51	49	55
Liu Hongyu (CHN)	56	55	56	53	60	60	58	57	59	59	59	58
David Lilley (ENG)	57	59	60	60	58	51	54	53	52	53	57	60
Long Zehuang (CHN)	58	54	55	54	54	54	53	54	54	52	50	50
Anthony McGill (SCO)	59	58	58	57	45	45	48	48	47	45	42	38
Sanderson Lam (ENG)	60	60	61	61	62	63	62	62	66	66	65	67
Graeme Dott (SCO)	61	62	62	64	66	66	66	67	68	68	76	85
Cao Yupeng (CHN)	62	65	65	66	67	68	68	80	82	98	109	129
Ishpreet Singh Chadha (IND)	63	63	64	63	63	65	65	65	65	63	62	59
Stan Moody (ENG)	64	61	57	55	49	50	50	50	50	50	44	40
Zak Surety (ENG)	65	64	63	62	61	53	52	52	46	46	43	42
Michael Holt (ENG)	66	67	66	65	65	64	61	61	61	60	56	51
Oliver Lines (ENG)	67	66	67	67	64	59	60	60	58	58	58	53
Gong Chenzhi (CHN)	68	68	68	68	69	69	69	68	71	70	73	76
Duane Jones (WAL)	69	69	70	70	70	72	70	69	70	71	72	75
Sunny Akani (THA)	70	72	74	72	72	71	73	72	73	73	77	78
Antoni Kowalski (POL)	71	71	71	71	71	73	75	74	72	72	69	65
Ben Mertens (BEL)	72	70	69	69	68	67	67	66	67	67	66	62
Wang Yuchen (HKG)	73	73	72	73	76	70	72	71	69	69	71	74
Allan Taylor (ENG)	74	74	73	74	75	76	76	75	75	75	70	68
Amir Sarkhosh (IRN)	75	75	76	75	77	78	80	79	78	79	79	81
Liam Davies (WAL)	76	79	78	77	73	75	77	78	77	78	80	82
Julien Leclercq (BEL)	77	78	80	80	80	81	79	78	79	76	74	69
Artemijs Zizins (LAT)	78	77	75	76	78	80	78	77	76	77	68	71
Bulcsú Révész (HUN)	79	81	82	82	82	87	86	85	87	88	88	84
Cheung Ka Wai (HKG)	80	83	84	84	86	85	87	88	88	85	87	91
Haydon Pinhey (ENG)	81	82	81	81	83	88	88	89	92	92	97	99
Haris Tahir (PAK)	82	86	83	83	84	85	84	87	89	90	94	98
Chris Totten (SCO)	83	89	89	90	92	98	98	99	100	101	101	102
Robbie McGuigan (NIR)	84	84	85	86	87	89	91	90	90	88	90	86
Farakh Ajaib (PAK)	85	76	79	79	79	79	81	81	80	80	84	89
Mitchell Mann (ENG)	86	90	91	91	84	82	82	82	81	82	83	88
Huang Jiahao (CHN)	87	86	85	86	89	83	84	86	86	86	91	95
Bai Yulu (CHN)	88	95	98	99	95	103	103	103	103	105	107	104
Ken Doherty (IRL)	89	92	95	97	99	100	102	102	104	102	102	106
Mink Nutcharut (THA)	90	106	109	107	109	116	116	119	120	121	121	121
Kreishh Gurbaxani (IND)	91	107	110	114	116	121	122	123	123	123	126	126
Jonas Luz (BRA)	92	98	103	105	106	110	114	114	114	114	115	117
Lim Kok Leong (MAS)	93	121	123	124	126	127	127	127	127	127	128	127
Hatem Yassen (EGY)	94	99	104	106	107	114	113	113	113	113	114	116
Mohammed Shehab (UAE)	95	103	107	110	112	118	119	120	121	117	116	118
Alexander Ursenbacher (SUI)		112	116	115	117	119	120	122	117	118	113	114
Chang Bingyu (CHN)		80	77	78	74	74	71	70	62	62	51	48
Chatchapong Nasa (THA)		102	106	109	111	117	117	118	115	115	117	119
Connor Benzey (ENG)		112	116	118	120	125	118	117	119	120	120	113
David Grace (ENG)		112	96	96	98	93	97	97	97	96	89	93
Dylan Emery (WAL)		96	94	92	94	91	94	94	95	95	95	90
Fergal Quinn (NIR)		112	116	118	120	123	124	125	125	125	127	115
Florian Nüßle (AUT)		124	126	127	128	128	128	128	128	128	122	122
Gao Yang (CHN)		97	102	104	102	105	109	108	105	103	99	94
Ian Burns (ENG)		122	124	125	105	106	101	101	99	100	96	96
Iulian Boiko (UKR)		87	87	87	88	90	89	83	83	83	82	87
Jimmy White (ENG)		125	115	113	115	122	123	124	124	124	123	123
Jiang Jun (CHN)		122	124	123	125	97	96	96	84	81	78	70
Lan Yuhao (CHN)		93	97	100	101	102	104	104	101	97	100	100
Leone Crowley (IRL)		112	116	118	108	113	115	115	116	116	118	111
Liam Graham (SCO)		108	111	111	113	115	108	107	108	107	110	112
Liam Highfield (ENG)		104	99	95	97	96	95	92	94	91	92	79
Liam Pullen (ENG)		108	111	102	103	86	83	84	85	84	86	73
Liu Wenwei (CHN)		119	121	122	123	109	110	111	111	111	105	108
Louis Heathcote (ENG)		93	90	88	81	77	74	73	74	74	75	77
Mahmoud El Hareedy (EGY)		125	127	129	129	129	129	129	129	129	129	128
Marco Fu (HKG)		125	101	101	96	95	93	95	96	94	85	80
Mateusz Baranowski (POL)		125	127	126	127	107	105	105	107	109	112	110
Michal Szubarczyk (POL)		100	105	108	110	101	99	98	98	99	98	97
Ng On Yee (HKG)		111	114	117	119	124	125	121	122	122	124	124
Oliver Brown (ENG)		104	108	112	114	120	121	116	118	119	119	120
Reanne Evans (ENG)		100	93	94	93	99	100	100	102	104	103	107
Ross Muir (SCO)		108	111	102	103	111	111	109	109	108	111	109
Sahil Nayyar (CAN)		112	116	118	120	125	125	126	126	126	125	125
Sam Craigie (ENG)		91	92	93	90	92	90	91	91	89	81	83
Steven Hallworth (ENG)		87	87	89	91	94	92	93	93	93	93	92
Xu Yichen (CHN)		125	127	128	124	112	112	112	112	112	104	103
Yao Pengcheng (CHN)		119	121	116	118	108	106	106	106	106	106	101
Zhao Hanyang (CHN)		112	100	98	100	104	107	110	110	110	108	105
