= Haris Tahir =

Pakistani snooker player

Personal information
- Born: 9 April 2000 (age 26) Lahore, Pakistan

Sport
- Country: Pakistan
- Sport: Snooker
- Professional: 2024–2026
- Highest ranking: 82 (October 2025)
- Best ranking finish: Last 32 (2024 British Open)

Haris Tahir (born 9 April 2000) is a Pakistani snooker player. He has earned a two-year card on the World Snooker Tour starting from the 2024-25 snooker season.

== Early and personal life ==
He is from Lahore, Punjab. He has the nickname 'Mr. One-Visit' due to his break-building power, which had led to over a hundred centuries in amateur tournament play. He scored his first 147 break in Lahore in 2015. He Scored 147 in a Tournament as well in Lahore in 2022. To date, he has scored a maximum break three times including practice and competition. He won the Pakistan national under-18 championship in 2020.

== Career ==
In 2017, Tahir was runner-up at the Pakistan national Under-21 Championship. In August of that year he reached the quarterfinal of the Pakistan National Ranking Snooker Championship in Karachi. He was the 2018 Punjab Champion. Then He won the 2020 Under-21 national championship. In October 2020, he reached the final of the Pakistan National Ranking Snooker Championship defeating former national champion Mohammad Bilal 6-3 in the semi-final before facing Mohammad Sajjad.

He competed at the ACBS Asian Snooker Championship in 2021 where he defeated Qatar’s Ali Alobaidli before overcoming Khalid Kamani of the UAE 5-2 in the quarter-final. In the semi-final he lost to the 2018 champion from Iran, Amir Sarkhosh. In September 2021, he was beaten by compatriot Babar Masih in the quarter finals of the Six Reds World Cup in Qatar.

In June 2023, he was selected to represent Pakistan in Asian 6 Red and Asian Team Championship in Tehran, Iran.

In January 2024, Tahir caused an upset at the NBP National Snooker Championship in Lahore, defeating former champion and fourth-seed Shahid Aftab on a deciding frame and qualified from the round-robin stage. He was defeated by Sohail Shahzad in the last-16.

In May 2024, he played at the Asia/Oceania Q School in Bangkok. In the second event Tahir came through 4-3 against China's Zhou Jinhao before facing Indian Laxman Rawat. He then came through a decider against Iran's Ehsan Heydari Nezhad. In the final round he beat Lan Yuhao of China to earn a two year card on the World Snooker Tour starting from the 2024–25 snooker season.

He recorded his first win as a professional when he defeated Jamie Jones in a qualifier for the Wuhan Open in July 2024. His run to the last-64 was ended by Chris Wakelin. In September 2024, he defeated Zak Surety at the 2024 Northern Ireland Open.

In June 2025, he received a walkover 5-0 victory in the first round of the 2025 Wuhan Open qualifying after former world champion Luca Brecel failed to show-up for their match. That month, he beat former world champion Ken Doherty in qualifying for the 2025 British Open. He was drawn in the round-robin stage of the 2025 Championship League against Barry Hawkins, Haydon Pinhey and John Astley, recording a win over group winner Pinhey but missing out on top-spot on frame difference. In November, his top break was 137 in a 6-3 win over Kreishh Gurbaxani at the 2025 UK Championship. In April, he recorded a 10-6 loss against Connor Benzey in the first round of qualifying for the 2026 World Snooker Championship. After dropping off the tour following the conclusion of the 2025-26 season, he entered Q School but was defeated by Paruke Aierken in event one.

== Performance and rankings timeline ==
Tournament	2024/ 25	2025/ 26
Ranking (Note: It shows the ranking at the beginning of the season)	(Note: New players on the Main Tour don't have a ranking)	82
Ranking tournaments
Championship League	A	RR
Saudi Arabia Masters	1R	2R
Wuhan Open	1R	1R
English Open	LQ	LQ
British Open	2R	1R
Xi'an Grand Prix	LQ	LQ
Northern Ireland Open	LQ	1R
International Championship	LQ	LQ
UK Championship	LQ	LQ
Shoot Out	1R	1R
Scottish Open	LQ	LQ
German Masters	LQ	LQ
World Grand Prix	DNQ	DNQ
Players Championship	DNQ	DNQ
Welsh Open	LQ	LQ
World Open	LQ	LQ
Tour Championship	DNQ	DNQ
World Championship	LQ	LQ

Performance Table Legend
LQ	lost in the qualifying draw	#R	lost in the early rounds of the tournament (WR = Wildcard round, RR = Round robin)	QF	lost in the quarter-finals
SF	lost in the semi-finals	F	lost in the final	W	won the tournament
DNQ	did not qualify for the tournament	A	did not participate in the tournament	WD	withdrew from the tournament

NH / Not Held	means an event was not held
NR / Non-Ranking Event	means an event is/was no longer a ranking event
R / Ranking Event	means an event is/was a ranking event
MR / Minor-Ranking Event	means an event is/was a minor-ranking event

== Career finals ==
=== Amateur finals: 1 ===
Outcome	No.	Year	Championship	Opponent in the final	Score
Runner-up	1.	2018	Asian Under-21 Championship	(Myanmar) Aung Phyo	4–6
