= 2025 British Open =

Snooker tournament

2025 Unibet British Open

Tournament information
- Dates: 22–28 September 2025
- Venue: The Centaur
- City: Cheltenham
- Country: England
- Organisation: World Snooker Tour
- Format: Ranking event
- Total prize fund: £502,000
- Winner's share: £100,000
- Highest break: Gary Wilson (ENG) (144)

Final
- Champion: Shaun Murphy (ENG)
- Runner-up: Anthony McGill (SCO)
- Score: 10–7

The 2025 British Open (officially the 2025 Unibet British Open) was a professional snooker tournament that took place from 22 to 28 September 2025 at the Centaur in Cheltenham, England. Qualifying took place from 25 to 28 June at the Leicester Arena in Leicester. The fifth consecutive edition of the tournament since it was revived in 2021, it was the fifth ranking event of the 2025–26 snooker season, following the 2025 English Open and preceding the 2025 Xi'an Grand Prix. It was broadcast by ITV in the United Kingdom and Ireland, by local channels in China and elsewhere in Asia, and by WST Play in mainland Europe and all other territories. The winner received £100,000 from a total prize fund of £502,000.

Mark Selby was the defending champion, having defeated John Higgins 10–5 in the 2024 final, but he lost 1–6 to Shaun Murphy in the semi-finals. The final was contested between Murphy and Anthony McGill, who reached his first ranking final in eight years. Murphy defeated McGill 10–7 to win his first British Open title and the 13th ranking title of his career. The event produced 74 century breaks, 11 during the qualifiers in Leicester and 63 at the main venue in Cheltenham, of which the highest was a 144 by Gary Wilson in his second-round match against McGill.

== Overview ==
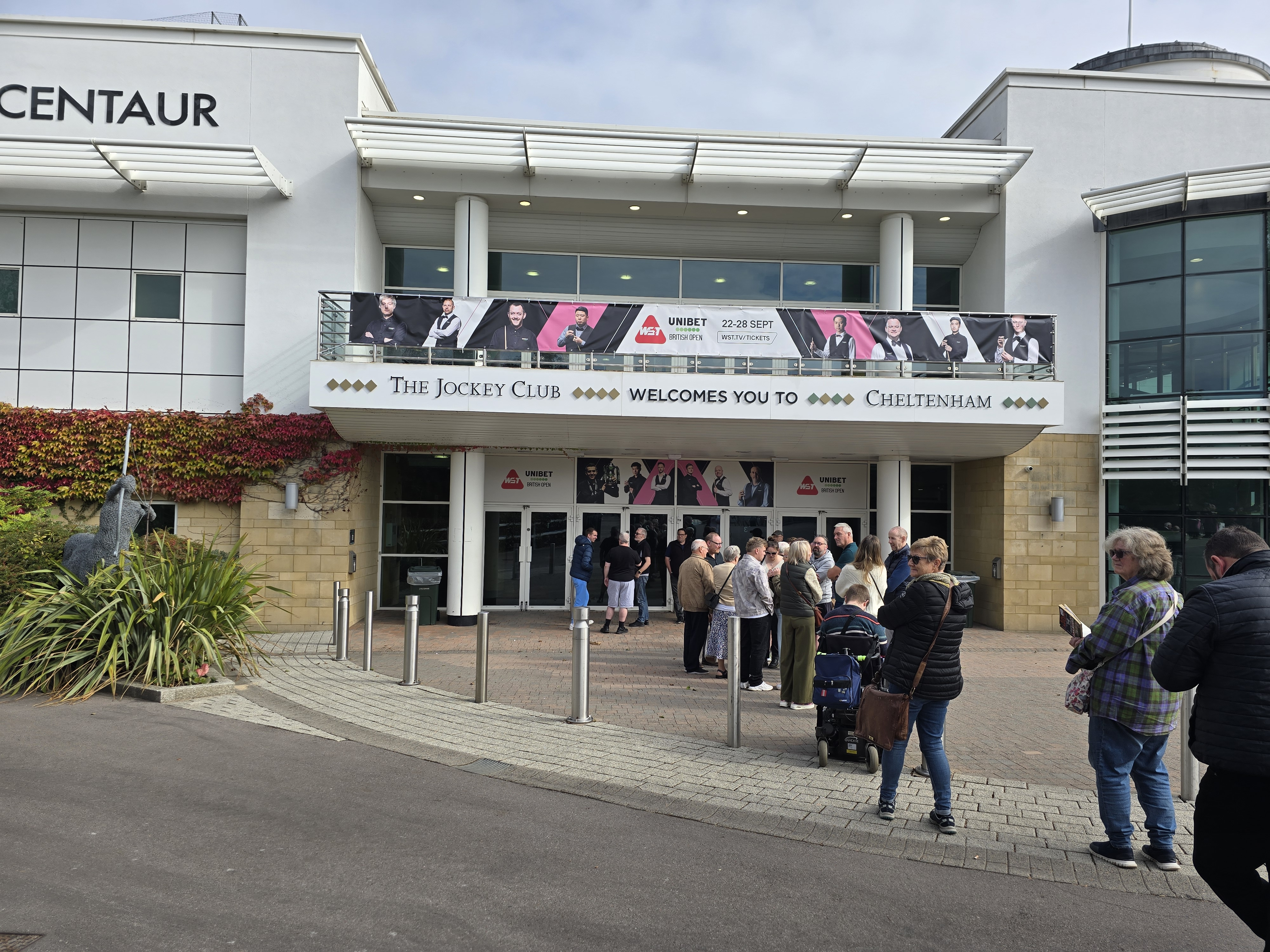
The Centaur at Cheltenham Racecourse (pictured) hosted the event.

The tournament began in 1980 as the non-ranking British Gold Cup, won by Alex Higgins. Held as the non-ranking Yamaha Organs Trophy in 1981 and the non-ranking Yamaha International Masters from 1982 to 1984, it was renamed the British Open in 1985, when it also gained ranking status. Staged 21 times as a ranking event from 1985 until its discontinuation after the 2004 edition, the tournament was revived as a ranking event in 2021. In 2022, the tournament trophy was named the Clive Everton Trophy to honour the longtime commentator and snooker journalist.

The 2025 edition of the tournament was held from 22 to 28 September at the Centaur in Cheltenham, England. Qualifying took place from 25 to 28 June at the Leicester Arena in Leicester. The tournament was the fifth ranking event of the 2025–26 snooker season, following the 2025 English Open and preceding the 2025 Xi'an Grand Prix. Mark Selby was the defending champion, having defeated John Higgins 10–5 in the 2024 final.

=== Format ===
There was no seeding system and the draw was randomised for every round. All matches up to the quarter‑finals were played as the best of 7 frames. The quarter‑finals were the best of 9 frames, the semi‑finals were the best of 11 frames, and the final was the best of 19 frames, played over two sessions.

The 16 qualifying matches featuring the highest ranked players were held over to be played in Cheltenham. Several players withdrew from the event and were replaced in the draw by the highest available players from the Q School top-up list. Luca Brecel withdrew before the qualifiers in Leicester and was replaced by Ashley Carty. Ronnie O'Sullivan and Tom Ford withdrew for medical reasons before the held-over qualifiers in Cheltenham and were replaced respectively by Daniel Womersley and Alfie Davies.

=== Broadcasters ===
The qualifying round was broadcast by Discovery+ in Germany, Austria and Italy; by HBO Max in other European territories; by Huya Live, Migu, the CBSA‑WPBSA Academy WeChat Channel and the CBSA‑WPBSA Academy Douyin in China; and by WST Play in the United Kingdom and all other territories worldwide without a broadcast agreement in place.

The main stage was broadcast in the UK and Ireland by ITV, which carried the tournament for the final time before domestic coverage moved to 5 for the 2026 edition. The main stage was broadcast in mainland China by the same broadcasters as the qualifying round. It was broadcast in Hong Kong by Now TV, in Malaysia and Brunei by Astro SuperSport, in Thailand by True Sports, in Taiwan by Sportcast, and in the Philippines by TAP Sports. In mainland Europe, and in territories where no other coverage was available, the tournament was streamed via WST Play.

=== Prize fund ===
The winner of the event received £100,000 from a total prize fund of £502,000. The breakdown of prize money for this event is shown below:

- Winner: £100,000
- Runner-up: £45,000
- Semi-final: £20,000
- Quarter-final: £12,000
- Last 16: £9,000
- Last 32: £6,000
- Last 64: £3,000
- Highest break: £5,000
- Total: £502,000

== Summary ==
=== Round one (qualifiers) ===
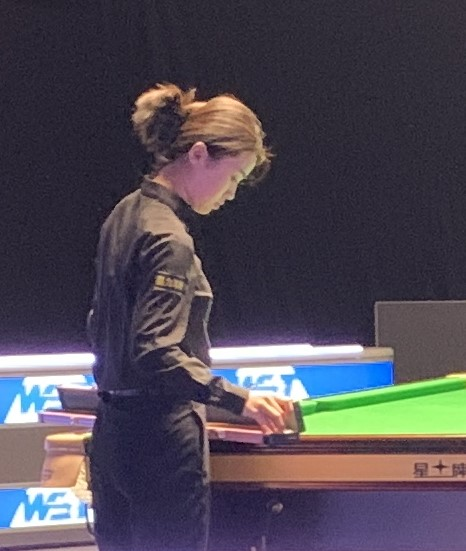
Two female players reached the last 64, the reigning World Women's Champion Bai Yulu (pictured in 2024) and 12-time World Women's Champion Reanne Evans.

All matches before the quarter-final stage were played as the best of seven frames. At the qualifiers held in Leicester, Marco Fu lost the first three frames against Stephen Maguire but made breaks of 140, 81, and 104 to tie the scores at 3–3 and then won the deciding frame. Jackson Page trailed Elliot Slessor 1–2 but won three consecutive frames for a 4–2 victory, while Haris Tahir beat Ken Doherty 4–3, making an 81 break in the decider. Amateur player Ryan Davies, who received a top-up place in the event via the Q School Order of Merit, defeated Jimmy Robertson on the last black of the deciding frame. Jack Lisowski made a 72 break in the decider to beat Liam Highfield, while Liam Davies defeated Jimmy White 4–2. Michał Szubarczyk, aged 14, the youngest player ever to turn professional, took a 3–2 lead over Umut Dikme, another top-up amateur player from the Q School Order of Merit. Dikme came from behind to win frame six on the colours and then made a 55 break to win the decider. Stuart Bingham made breaks of 102, 56, and 75 as he beat the 2022 champion Ryan Day, and Ben Mertens recovered from 1–3 behind against Liam Pullen to win the match in a deciding frame. Chang Bingyu made breaks of 118, 93, 64, and 70 as he beat Kreishh Gurbaxani 4–2.

Two female players advanced to the last 64, the reigning World Women's Champion Bai Yulu and the 12-time World Women's Champion Reanne Evans. Bai defeated Artemijs Žižins 4–2 after he attempted a maximum break in the second frame of the match but missed the 14th black. Evans secured a 4–1 victory over 16-year-old Lan Yuhao, who was playing his first season on the professional tour. Robbie McGuigan defeated Lyu Haotian 4–2, while Stan Moody made breaks of 55, 66, and 97 as he beat Zhou Yuelong by the same score. Returning to the tour after an extended absence due to a neck injury, Sam Craigie recorded his first professional victory in 16 months with a 4–1 win over Yao Pengcheng. New tour player Leone Crowley recorded his first professional victory with a whitewash win over Hatem Yassen, while Matthew Selt whitewashed David Gilbert and Lei Peifan whitewashed Mateusz Baranowski. From 46 points behind in the decider, Long Zehuang made a clearance of 57 to defeat Thepchaiya Un-Nooh, while Robert Milkins advanced with a 4–2 victory over Fan Zhengyi.

At the held-over qualifiers played in Cheltenham, the defending champion Mark Selby defeated David Grace 4–1, and the previous year's runner-up John Higgins came from 1–3 behind to beat Mark Davis in a deciding frame. Judd Trump, the world number one, made two centuries of 103 and 101 as he whitewashed Aaron Hill in 53 minutes. "I have felt good this season, the results just haven't quite come," said Trump, who had not won a title in 2025. "Games like the one tonight give you a boost. I have scored well in most matches, my opponents have just potted some brilliant balls at the winning line and not given me a chance." The reigning World Champion Zhao Xintong defeated amateur player Ashley Hugill in a deciding frame, and Neil Robertson whitewashed amateur player Alfie Davies. Kyren Wilson made a 141 break as he beat Chris Wakelin 4–1, and Mark Williams made a 127 in the last frame of his 4–2 victory over Si Jiahui. Shaun Murphy advanced by beating Ross Muir 4–1, while Mark Allen, recent winner of the 2025 English Open, defeated Jiang Jun by the same score.

=== Round two (last 64) ===
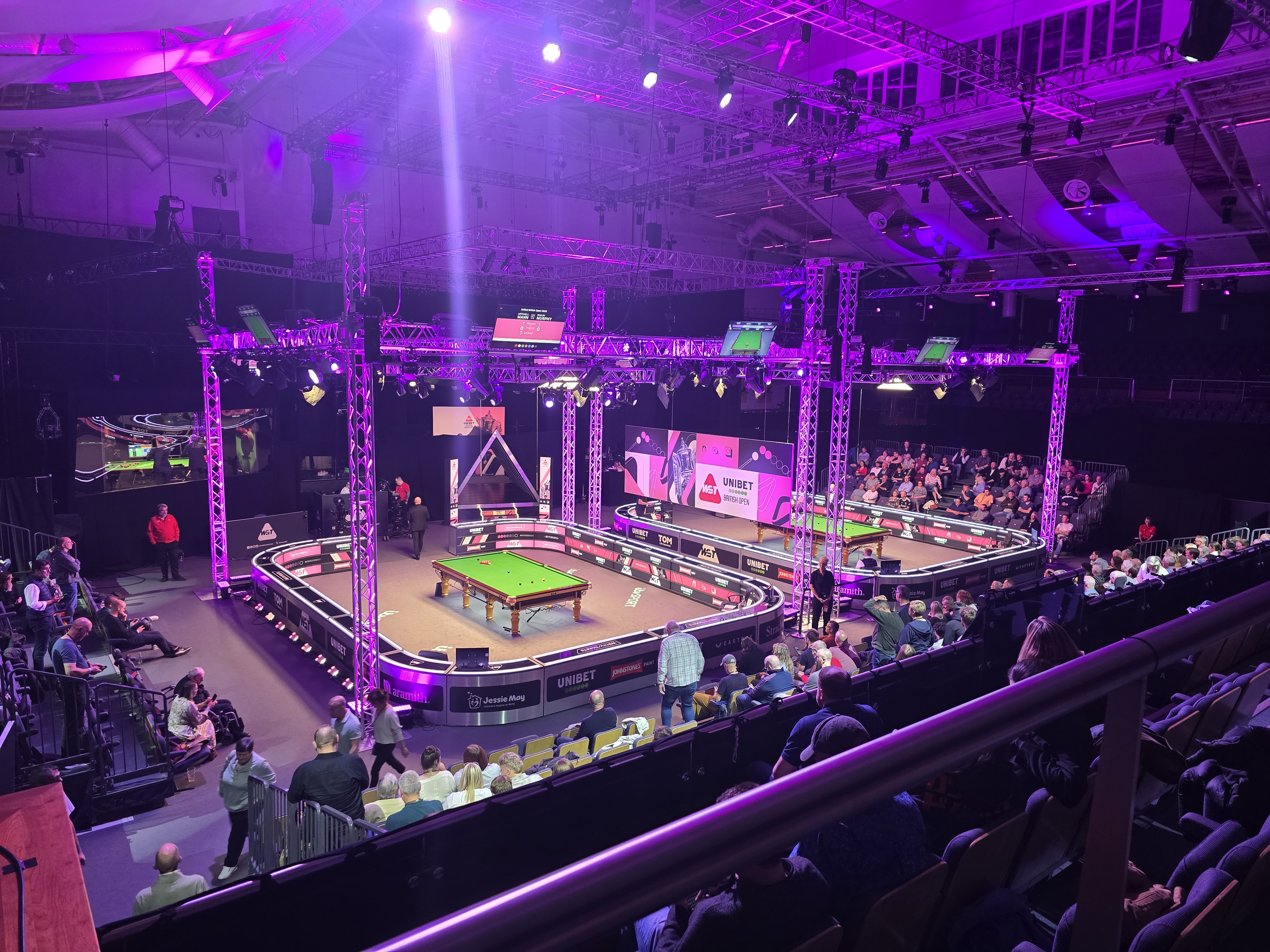
The interior of the arena at the Centaur in Cheltenham, pictured during the event.

The world number 55 Stan Moody, recently a quarter-finalist at the 2025 Wuhan Open, made a century of 132 as he moved into a 3–1 lead over Kyren Wilson, the 2024 World Champion. Wilson made an 82 break in the fifth frame, but Moody secured a 4–2 victory by winning frame six. Calling it his "best win on tour," Moody said afterwards: "Beating Ding [at the 2025 Wuhan Open] was very good but this tops it, on ITV in front of a big crowd in Cheltenham. I tried to stay as calm as I could towards the end and managed to get over the line." Higgins trailed Lisowski 0–2 and 2–3 but won the sixth frame on the colours and then took the deciding frame with a century of 132. Following his second consecutive victory in a decider, Higgins said: "I am so lucky to still be in the tournament. I really need to improve. I know I have not put the effort into practice and you get what you deserve. I should have gone out in the first round. But the last frame today did give me some confidence." Williams came from 2–3 behind to beat the world number 61 Sanderson Lam in a decider.

Zhao beat Stuart Bingham 4–1, making centuries of 127 and 133. Facing Bai, Zhang Anda made three consecutive centuries of 101, 130, and 125 as he took a 3–1 lead. Bai recovered to tie the scores at 3–3 as she attempted to become the first woman to defeat a top-16 opponent in a ranking tournament. However, Zhang won the decider to advance. Mertens whitewashed Evans, the other female player in the last 64. McGuigan defeated He Guoqiang, winning the deciding frame on the last black. Anthony McGill eliminated Gary Wilson 4–1, although Wilson made the tournament's highest break of 144 in the frame he won. Robertson defeated Xu Si by the same score. Allen advanced by beating Bulcsú Révész, also by a 4–1 scoreline, while Iulian Boiko defeated Craigie 4–2.

Mitchell Mann arrived late for his match against Gao Yang after his car broke down en route to the venue. He was docked the first frame and also lost the second, but he recovered to tie the scores at 2–2. Gao won the fifth frame, but Mann made a 72 break to force a decider, which he won by clearing from the last red. Trump lost the first frame against Crowley but won four in a row for a 4–1 victory. Murphy defeated Scott Donaldson by the same score. The defending champion Selby made breaks of 115 and 94 as he won the first three frames against Liu Hongyu, but Liu produced breaks of 86, 58, and 100 as he drew level at 3–3. Selby won the deciding frame with a 65 break. Cheung Ka Wai also defeated Matthew Stevens in a decider.

=== Round three (last 32) ===
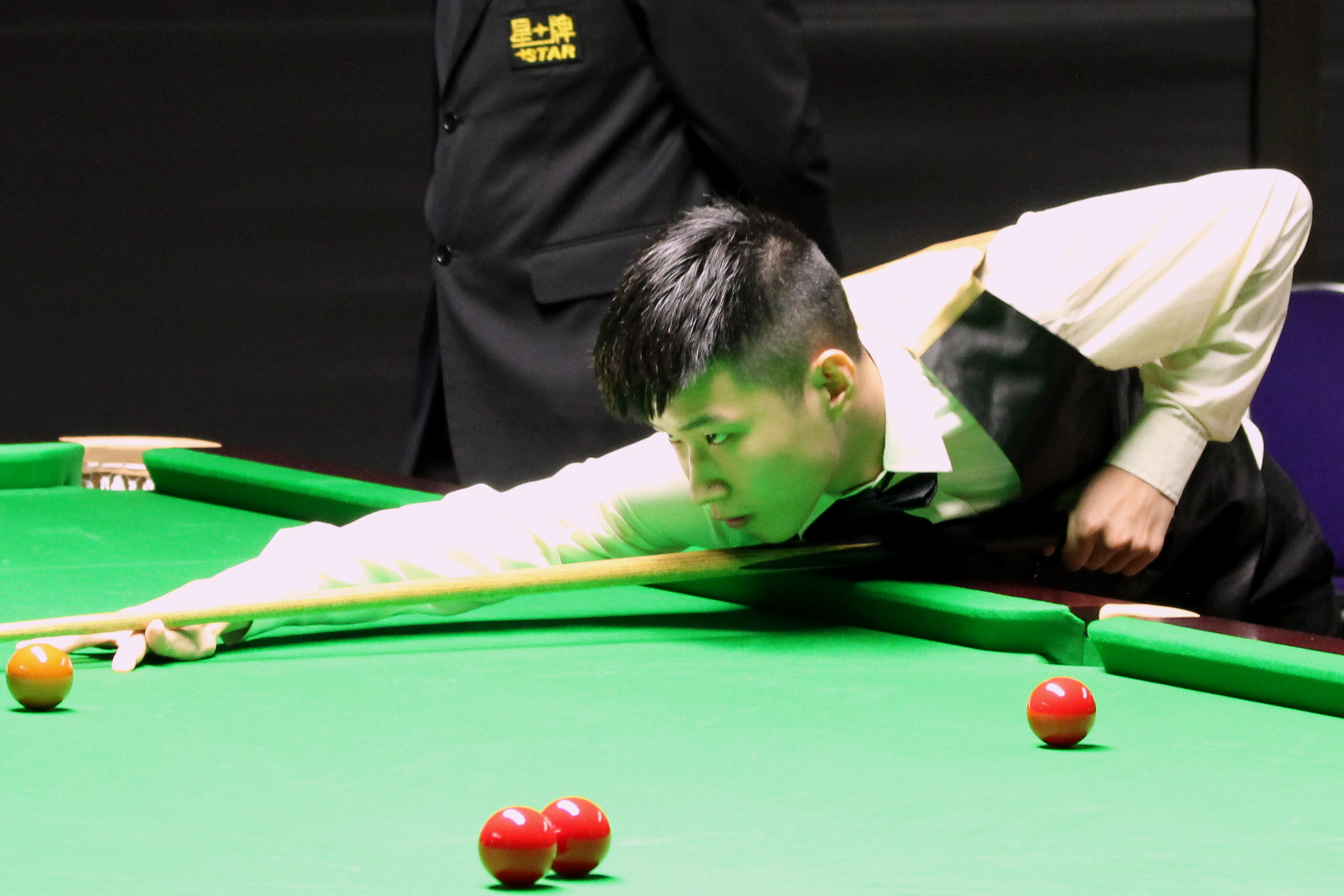
The reigning World Champion Zhao Xintong (pictured in 2016) lost 2–4 to John Higgins in the last 32, despite making two century breaks of 133 and 135.

Higgins, who had stated during the 2025 Wuhan Open that he was struggling for motivation that season, made breaks of 76, 82, and 55 as he defeated Zhao 4–2. Zhao made centuries of 133 and 135 in the two frames he won. Liam Davies compiled breaks of 123, 59, and 63 to beat David Lilley 4–2, while Mann defeated Antoni Kowalski by the same score. Davies and Mann reached the last 16 of a ranking event for the second and fifth time respectively. Louis Heathcote made a century break of 105 as he advanced with a whitewash win over Zak Surety, and McGill made a highest break of 91 as he beat Oliver Lines 4–1. Barry Hawkins lost the first two frames against Jak Jones and also trailed 2–3 but recovered to win the match with an 88 break in the deciding frame. "I was cueing terribly at the start of the match and felt jaded," Hawkins said afterwards."It was only in the last frame that I switched on and made a really good break, so I'm delighted to still be in the tournament."

Facing Robertson, Murphy produced breaks of 86 and 50 as he won the first two frames. Robertson took the third with a century of 100, but Murphy won frame four on the colours. In the fifth, Robertson missed the last red while on a break of 66, and Murphy recovered to win the frame on a re-spotted black for a 4–1 victory. Facing Joe O'Connor, the defending champion Selby won the first three frames. O'Connor recovered to force a deciding frame, but Selby won the decider to advance. Williams defeated Allen, also in a deciding frame. Ali Carter whitewashed Boiko, while Mertens advanced to the last 16 of a ranking event for the second time by whitewashing McGuigan. Xiao Guodong beat Zhang with a 62 break in the deciding frame.

=== Round four (last 16) ===
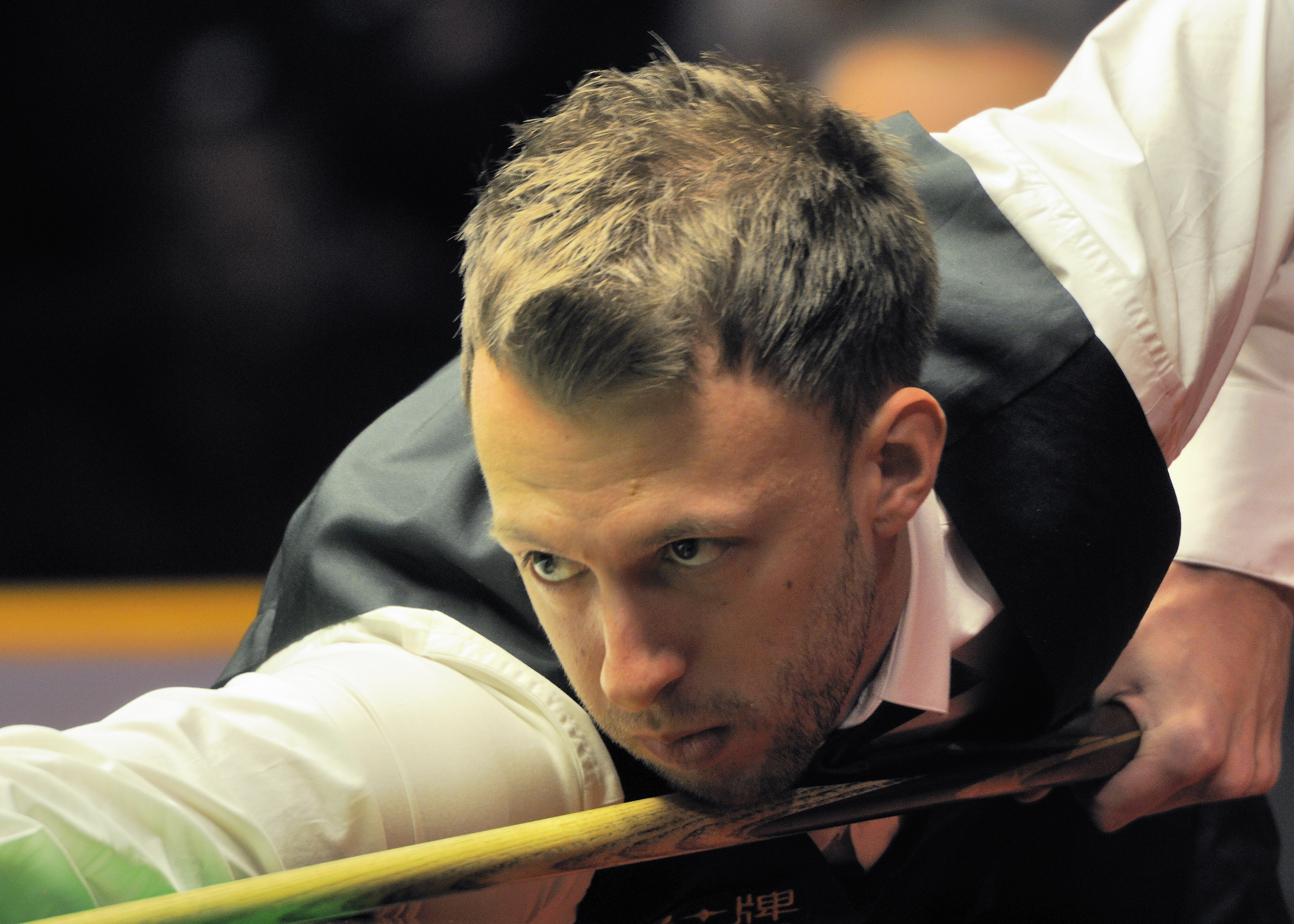
The world number one Judd Trump (pictured in 2014) lost in the last 16 to Shaun Murphy.

The world number 88 Heathcote defeated Davies 4–2 to reach the third ranking quarter-final of his career. After the match, Heathcote spoke about his mentoring relationship with former professional player Anthony Hamilton, who had retired at the end of the 2024–25 season after 34 years on tour. "I started practising with him because I felt I was always losing to those type of experienced players so I wanted to learn something from playing with him. I knew it was going to be torture, but I wanted to learn how to beat him," said Heathcote. Mann defeated Hawkins by the same score, reaching the quarter-finals of a full ranking event for the second time, having previously done so at the 2021 Northern Ireland Open. Higgins beat Mertens 4–1.

Facing Trump, Murphy made a 131 break as he moved into a 3–1 lead. Trump tied the scores at 3–3, but Murphy won the deciding frame with a century of 123. "I must be in a very small club of players who have beaten [Robertson] and [Trump] on the same day," Murphy said after the match. "In a way it made my job easy today because I knew I needed to play at my best." Trump's defeat meant that he had failed to reach a semi-final thus far that season. The defending champion Selby whitewashed Chang in 58 minutes, while Williams made a highest break of 123 as he defeated Lei 4–1. Moody beat Carter in a decider, and McGill made a highest break of 105 as he defeated Xiao 4–2.

=== Quarter-finals ===
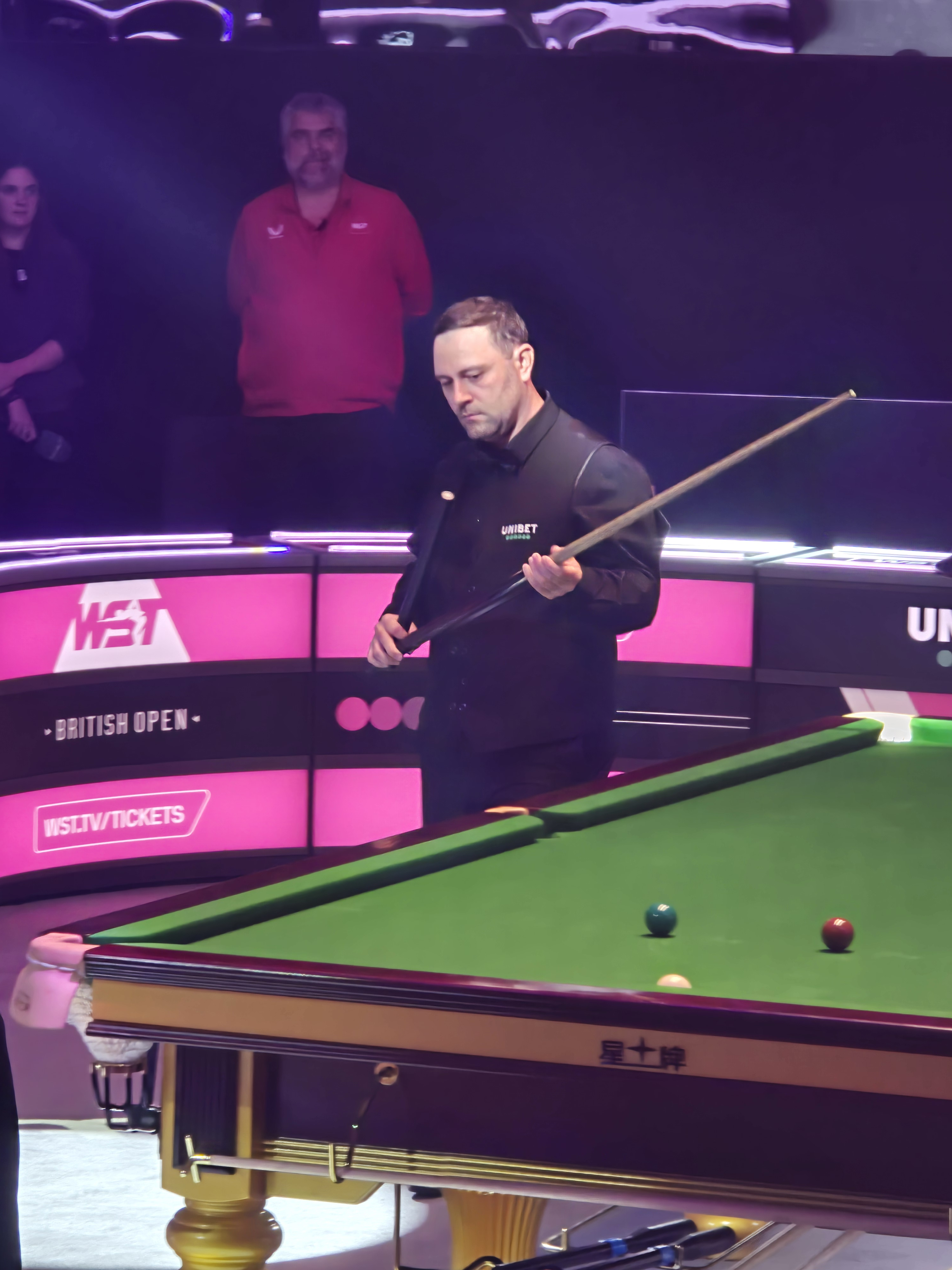
Mitchell Mann (pictured at the event) played in the second ranking quarter-final of his career but lost to Shaun Murphy.

The quarter-finals were played as the best of nine frames. The defending champion Selby contested his first ranking quarter-final of the season, where he faced Williams. Selby won the first frame with a 41 clearance and took the second on the colours. Williams then won three consecutive frames, but Selby made a century of 106 to tie the scores at 3–3. Williams led by 53 points in the seventh frame but missed a pot on a red, giving Selby the opportunity to make a 44 break. Selby went on to win the frame following a safety battle on the last red. After Williams missed a pot on the black in frame eight, Selby secured a 5–3 victory to reach the 68th ranking semi-final of his career. "I am close to playing well [but] my concentration is wavering a bit. I am missing a few easy balls so I need to stay more focused," said Selby after the match. Facing McGill, 19-year-old Moody won three of the first four frames as he tried to become the first British teenager to reach a ranking semi-final since Trump at the 2008 Grand Prix. McGill then made breaks of 61, 77, and 71 to win three consecutive frames for a 4–3 lead. The eighth frame came down to the colours. Moody attempted a swerve shot to pot the last green but missed, and McGill completed a 5–3 win, reaching his first ranking semi-final since the 2022 Northern Ireland Open. "I had let him get ahead by making daft mistakes, but at 3–1 there was still a long way to go and I knew there was time to pull it back," McGill said afterwards.

Heathcote won the first two frames against Higgins, making a 93 break in the second. Higgins then produced breaks of 86, 74, 66, 52, 135, and 57 as he won five consecutive frames for a 5–2 victory, reaching the 89th ranking semi-final of his career. Heathcote scored just 39 points across the last five frames. "I hit the ball better. That's probably the best I have felt this season," said Higgins afterwards. Facing Mann, Murphy made breaks of 57, 54, 75, and 87 to lead 3–0 after 40 minutes. Mann won the fourth frame on the colours, but Murphy made a 51 break to go 4–1 in front. Mann made a 63 break in frame six, but Murphy produced a clearance of 73 to complete a 5–1 victory and reach his 54th ranking semi-final. "It's really rewarding to see the hard work paying off," said Murphy afterwards, noting that he had been practicing a lot since the summer and "doing the right things away from tournaments".

=== Semi-finals ===
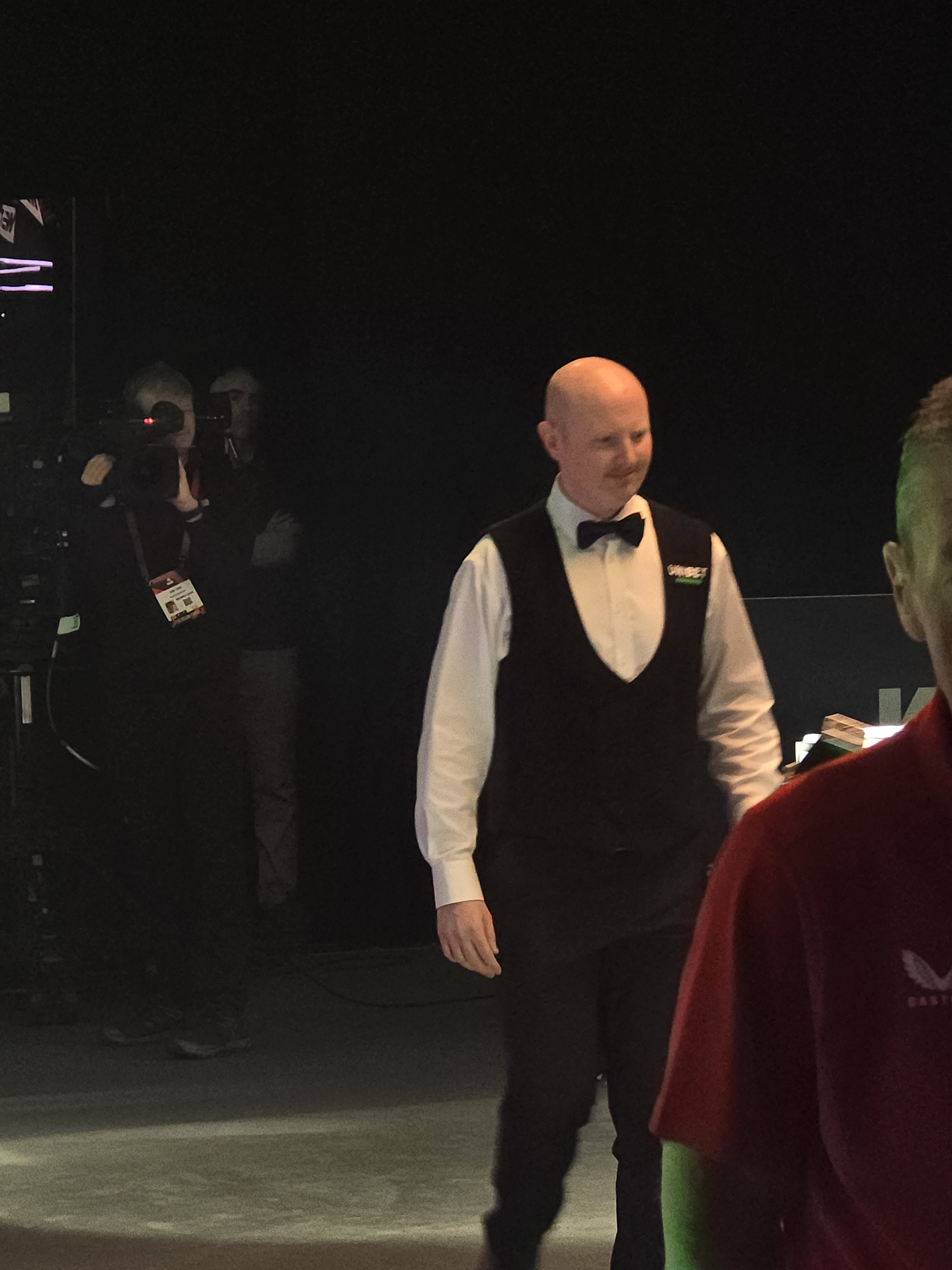
Anthony McGill (pictured at the event) defeated John Higgins to reach his first ranking final in eight years.

The semi-finals were played as the best of 11 frames. Playing Higgins in the first semi-final, McGill won the 30-minute opening frame when Higgins went in-off after potting the last yellow. Higgins took the second after a safety battle on the last brown and also won the third with a 62 break. In frame four, Higgins missed a red, and McGill made a 99 break to tie the scores at 2–2 at the mid-session interval. Higgins made a 111 break to win frame five, but McGill then won four consecutive frames with breaks of 50, 57, 104, and 93 to secure a 6–3 victory. "It's fantastic win for me because [Higgins] is a legend," said McGill afterwards. "This will be the biggest final of my career. I have had a lot of good wins at the Crucible but this would definitely top all of them. I wasn't nervous today, I was really enjoying the occasion." Higgins commented: "[McGill] hit the ball superbly well, like the way we all know he can. A big turning point was the fourth frame when I missed an unforgiveable red with the rest with the balls at my mercy. If I had gone 3–1 up, I would have been in control."

Facing Selby in the second semi-final, Murphy won both of the first two frames after safety battles on the last green and took the third with a century of 116. Selby won the fourth with a century of 123 to leave Murphy leading 3–1 at the mid-session interval. In frame five, Selby missed a red while on a break of 54 and subsequently made a safety error on the last red that let Murphy extend his lead to 4–1. Selby required three snookers in frame six, as he trailed by 60 points with three reds remaining. He secured the required penalty points but missed a pot on the last yellow, and Murphy went on to win the frame. Murphy then made a 93 break in frame seven to complete a 6–1 victory. "If you are going to beat [Selby] you have to take the game to him and score when you get chances," said Murphy afterwards. "I'm reluctant to say I mixed it with him in the safety department because I had to ride my luck at times. But overall I'm delighted with the performance." Selby commented: "[Murphy] played great from start to finish. There were a few fifty-fifty frames I could have won which could have made a difference. But I wasn't good enough and [Murphy] was very strong."

=== Final ===
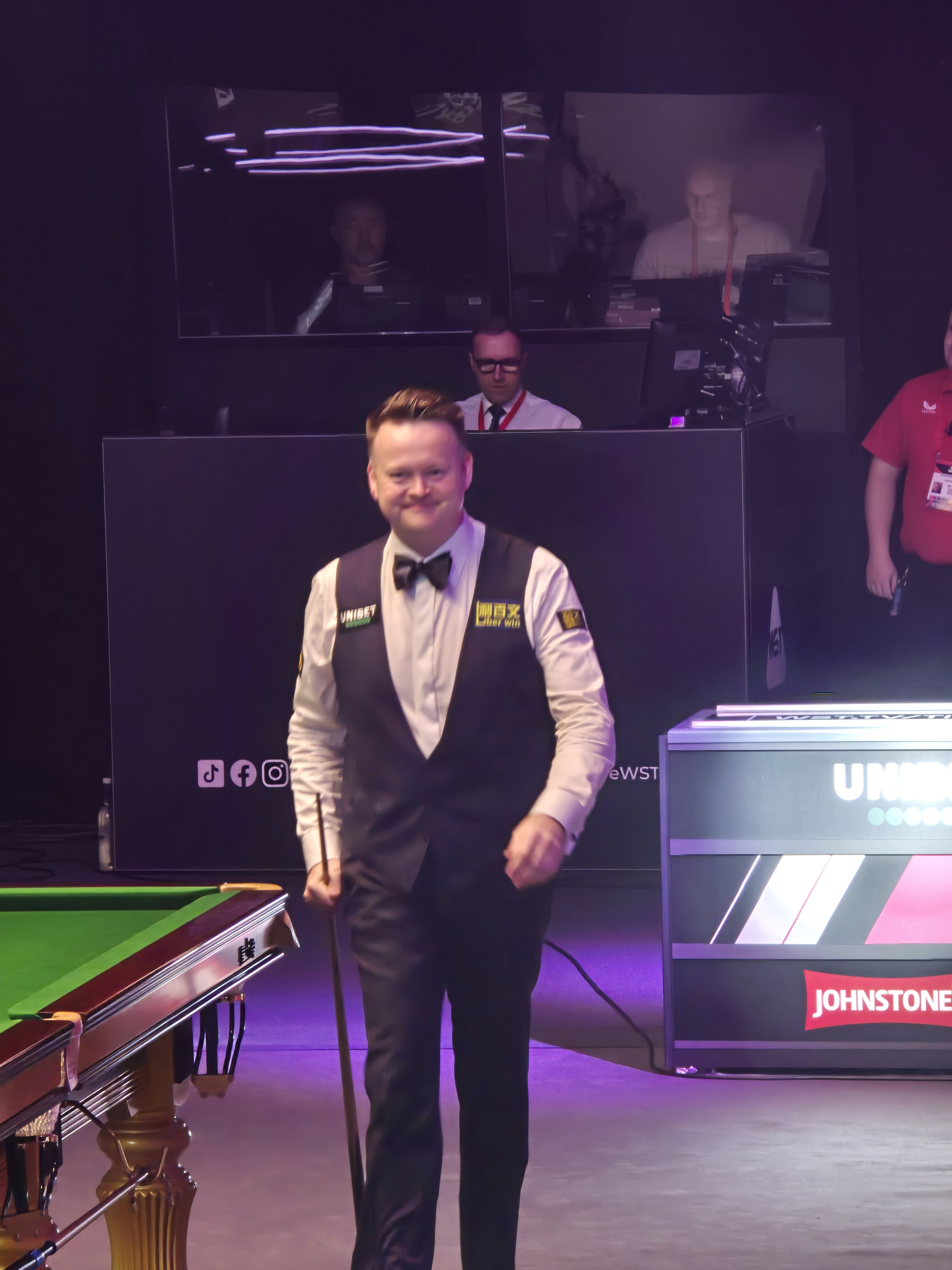
Shaun Murphy (pictured at the event) defeated Anthony McGill 10–7 in the final to win his first British Open title and the 13th ranking title of his career.

The final was played as the best of 19 frames, held over two sessions, between the world number 16 Murphy and the world number 57 McGill. Murphy was contesting the 27th ranking final of his career, while McGill was playing in his fourth ranking final and his first in eight years. It was the first two-session ranking final of McGill's career, as his finals at the 2016 and 2017 Indian Open had been the best of nine frames and the 2017 Snooker Shoot-Out final was played over one frame. Murphy had won eight of the last ten professional meetings between the two players. McGill won the first two frames of the final with breaks of 68 and 78. Murphy made a century of 101 to take the third, but McGill responded with a century of 109 in the fourth to lead 3–1 at the mid-session interval. Murphy made a century of 132 to win frame five. In frame six, Murphy led by 22 points when he missed a pot on the last red, and McGill cleared to restore a two-frame lead at 4–2. However, Murphy won the last two frames of the session with breaks of 78 and 112 to tie the scores at 4–4.

When play resumed for the second session, Murphy won the ninth frame with a 78 break to lead for the first time at 5–4. In frame 10, Murphy missed a pot on the black, and McGill made an 81 break to tie the scores at 5–5. Murphy again missed the black in frame 11 while leading by 37 points, and McGill took the frame with a 77 break. Murphy won the 12th frame after McGill missed a long pot with four reds remaining, tying the scores at 6–6. McGill took frame 13 with a 73 break to move 7–6 ahead, but Murphy produced a break of 76 in the 14th to draw level again at 7–7. Murphy won the next two frames with breaks of 72 and 66 to lead 9–7. In frame 17, Murphy won a safety exchange on the last red and made a match-winning clearance to secure a 10–7 victory. In all, the match produced four century breaks and ten more breaks over 60.

The win gave Murphy his first British Open title, the 13th ranking title of his professional career, and his first victory at a ranking event since the 2023 Championship League 26 months earlier. He advanced from 16th to 12th place in the world rankings after the tournament, while McGill as runner-up moved up from 57th to 45th. "When you haven't been in a ranking final for a long time, I was grateful for the opportunity and so pleased that my game was there today when I needed it," Murphy said afterwards. "I have a great team behind me who help me so much, when I am not feeling 100 per cent they push me on. For it all to come together today is extremely rewarding." McGill commented: "I felt like the stronger player all day. I'm not sure what happened towards the end, I wasn't nervous or anything, I just didn't seem to participate in the last few frames. [Murphy] is a quality player."

== Main draw ==
Match winners are shown in bold.

=== Round 2 ===
All matches were the best of seven frames.

- **Zak Surety** (ENG) **4**–0 Ashley Carty (ENG) (a)
- **Zhang Anda** (CHN) **4**–3 Bai Yulu (CHN)
- **Barry Hawkins** (ENG) **4**–0 Yuan Sijun (CHN)
- **Chang Bingyu** (CHN) **4**–1 Long Zehuang (CHN)
- He Guoqiang (CHN) 3–**4** **Robbie McGuigan** (NIR)
- Ben Woollaston (ENG) 3–**4** **Noppon Saengkham** (THA)
- **John Higgins** (SCO) **4**–3 Jack Lisowski (ENG)
- Haris Tahir (PAK) 2–**4** **Louis Heathcote** (ENG)
- **Mark Williams** (WAL) **4**–3 Sanderson Lam (ENG)
- Amir Sarkhosh (IRN) 0–**4** **Jak Jones** (WAL)
- **Iulian Boiko** (UKR) **4**–2 Sam Craigie (ENG)
- Jackson Page (WAL) 1–**4** **Oliver Lines** (ENG)
- Stuart Bingham (ENG) 1–**4** **Zhao Xintong** (CHN)
- Umut Dikme (GER) (a) 2–**4** **Xiao Guodong** (CHN)
- **Ian Burns** (ENG) **4**–3 Marco Fu (HKG)
- **Stan Moody** (ENG) **4**–2 Kyren Wilson (ENG)
- **Neil Robertson** (AUS) **4**–1 Xu Si (CHN)
- Ryan Davies (ENG) (a) 2–**4** **Liam Davies** (WAL)
- Robert Milkins (ENG) 2–**4** **Antoni Kowalski** (POL)
- **Anthony McGill** (SCO) **4**–1 Gary Wilson (ENG)
- **Mitchell Mann** (ENG) **4**–3 Gao Yang (CHN)
- Xu Yichen (CHN) 3–**4** **David Lilley** (ENG)
- Bulcsú Révész (HUN) 1–**4** **Mark Allen** (NIR)
- **Ben Mertens** (BEL) **4**–0 Reanne Evans (ENG)
- **Cheung Ka Wai** (HKG) **4**–3 Matthew Stevens (WAL)
- **Mark Selby** (ENG) **4**–3 Liu Hongyu (CHN)
- **Judd Trump** (ENG) **4**–1 Leone Crowley (IRL)
- **Lei Peifan** (CHN) **4**–1 Matthew Selt (ENG)
- **Joe O'Connor** (ENG) **4**–1 Allan Taylor (ENG)
- **Shaun Murphy** (ENG) **4**–1 Scott Donaldson (SCO)
- **Martin O'Donnell** (ENG) **4**–2 Sunny Akani (THA)
- Wu Yize (CHN) 3–**4** **Ali Carter** (ENG)

=== Round 3 ===
All matches were the best of seven frames.

- Antoni Kowalski (POL) 2–**4** **Mitchell Mann** (ENG)
- **John Higgins** (SCO) **4**–2 Zhao Xintong (CHN)
- **Anthony McGill** (SCO) **4**–1 Oliver Lines (ENG)
- **Liam Davies** (WAL) **4**–2 David Lilley (ENG)
- Zak Surety (ENG) 0–**4** **Louis Heathcote** (ENG)
- **Barry Hawkins** (ENG) **4**–3 Jak Jones (WAL)
- **Stan Moody** (ENG) **4**–2 Ian Burns (ENG)
- Noppon Saengkham (THA) 3–**4** **Chang Bingyu** (CHN)
- Cheung Ka Wai (HKG) 1–**4** **Lei Peifan** (CHN)
- **Mark Williams** (WAL) **4**–3 Mark Allen (NIR)
- Iulian Boiko (UKR) 0–**4** **Ali Carter** (ENG)
- Joe O'Connor (ENG) 3–**4** **Mark Selby** (ENG)
- **Judd Trump** (ENG) **4**–2 Martin O'Donnell (ENG)
- **Shaun Murphy** (ENG) **4**–1 Neil Robertson (AUS)
- **Ben Mertens** (BEL) **4**–0 Robbie McGuigan (NIR)
- Zhang Anda (CHN) 3–**4** **Xiao Guodong** (CHN)

=== Round 4 ===
All matches were the best of seven frames.

- **Mitchell Mann** (ENG) **4**–2 Barry Hawkins (ENG)
- Chang Bingyu (CHN) 0–**4** **Mark Selby** (ENG)
- Lei Peifan (CHN) 1–**4** **Mark Williams** (WAL)
- Liam Davies (WAL) 2–**4** **Louis Heathcote** (ENG)
- **Shaun Murphy** (ENG) **4**–3 Judd Trump (ENG)
- Xiao Guodong (CHN) 2–**4** **Anthony McGill** (SCO)
- **Stan Moody** (ENG) **4**–3 Ali Carter (ENG)
- **John Higgins** (SCO) **4**–1 Ben Mertens (BEL)

=== Quarter-finals ===
All matches were the best of nine frames.

- Mark Williams (WAL) 3–**5** **Mark Selby** (ENG)
- Stan Moody (ENG) 3–**5** **Anthony McGill** (SCO)
- Louis Heathcote (ENG) 2–**5** **John Higgins** (SCO)
- **Shaun Murphy** (ENG) **5**–1 Mitchell Mann (ENG)

=== Semi-finals ===
Matches were the best of eleven frames.

- **Anthony McGill** (SCO) **6**–3 John Higgins (SCO)
- Mark Selby (ENG) 1–**6** **Shaun Murphy** (ENG)

=== Final: frame scores ===
Final: Best of 19 frames. Referee: Colin Humphries; The Centaur, Cheltenham, England, 28 September 2025
Anthony McGill; Scotland	7–**10**	**Shaun Murphy**; England
Afternoon: **85**–28, **110**–14, 4–**106** (101), **109**–14 (109), 0–**133** (132), **61**–52, 9–**85**, 0–**118** (112); Evening: 0–**78**, **81**–15, **77**–38, 32–**67**, **89**–0, 9–**78**, 40–**97**, 0–**100**, 43–**81**
(frame 4) 109	Highest break	**132** (frame 5)
1	Century breaks	**3**

== Qualifying draw ==
=== Cheltenham ===
The sixteen qualifying matches featuring the highest ranked players were played at the Centaur in Cheltenham on 22 and 23 September:

- Barry Hawkins (ENG) 4–0 Daniel Wells (WAL)
- Ashley Hugill (ENG) (a) 3–4 Zhao Xintong (CHN)
- Judd Trump (ENG) 4–0 Aaron Hill (IRL)
- Sanderson Lam (ENG) 4–2 Daniel Womersley (ENG) (a) (Note: Daniel Womersley replaced Ronnie O'Sullivan, who withdrew for medical reasons.)
- Pang Junxu (CHN) 0–4 Wu Yize (CHN)
- Alfie Davies (WAL) (a) (Note: Alfie Davies replaced Tom Ford, who withdrew for medical reasons.) 0–4 Neil Robertson (AUS)
- Jiang Jun (CHN) 1–4 Mark Allen (NIR)
- Kyren Wilson (ENG) 4–1 Chris Wakelin (ENG)
- David Grace (ENG) 1–4 Mark Selby (ENG)
- Ross Muir (SCO) 1–4 Shaun Murphy (ENG)
- Xiao Guodong (CHN) 4–1 Haydon Pinhey (ENG)
- Mark Williams (WAL) 4–2 Si Jiahui (CHN)
- Zhang Anda (CHN) 4–3 Duane Jones (WAL)
- Patrick Whelan (ENG) (a) 2–4 Ali Carter (ENG)
- John Higgins (SCO) 4–3 Mark Davis (ENG)
- Gary Wilson (ENG) 4–1 Hossein Vafaei (IRN)

=== Leicester ===
The remaining qualifying matches were played at the Leicester Arena between 25 and 28 June.

- Yuan Sijun (CHN) 4–3 Jamie Jones (WAL)
- Marco Fu (HKG) 4–3 Stephen Maguire (SCO)
- Jonas Luz (BRA) 1–4 Cheung Ka Wai (HKG)
- Elliot Slessor (ENG) 2–4 Jackson Page (WAL)
- Jimmy Robertson (ENG) 3–4 Ryan Davies (ENG) (a)
- Haris Tahir (PAK) 4–3 Ken Doherty (IRL)
- Jimmy White (ENG) 2–4 Liam Davies (WAL)
- Ashley Carty (ENG) (a) (Note: Ashley Carty replaced Luca Brecel, who withdrew.) 4–2 Alexander Ursenbacher (SUI)
- Louis Heathcote (ENG) 4–3 Jordan Brown (NIR)
- Wang Yuchen (HKG) 3–4 Mitchell Mann (ENG)
- Ishpreet Singh Chadha (IND) 2–4 Scott Donaldson (SCO)
- Jack Lisowski (ENG) 4–3 Liam Highfield (ENG)
- Kreishh Gurbaxani (IND) 2–4 Chang Bingyu (CHN)
- Xu Si (CHN) 4–0 Florian Nüßle (AUT)
- Liu Hongyu (CHN) 4–0 Ng On-yee (HKG)
- Fergal Quinn (NIR) 2–4 Gao Yang (CHN)
- He Guoqiang (CHN) 4–0 Farakh Ajaib (PAK)
- Steven Hallworth (ENG) 0–4 Sunny Akani (THA)
- Michał Szubarczyk (POL) 3–4 Umut Dikme (GER) (a)
- Liam Pullen (ENG) 3–4 Ben Mertens (BEL)
- Ryan Day (WAL) 2–4 Stuart Bingham (ENG)
- Gong Chenzhi (CHN) 1–4 Jak Jones (WAL)
- David Lilley (ENG) 4–2 Liam Graham (SCO)
- Chris Totten (SCO) 0–4 Antoni Kowalski (POL)
- Noppon Saengkham (THA) 4–1 Liu Wenwei (CHN)
- Huang Jiahao (CHN) 2–4 Matthew Stevens (WAL)
- Robbie McGuigan (NIR) 4–2 Lyu Haotian (CHN)
- Stan Moody (ENG) 4–2 Zhou Yuelong (CHN)
- Yao Pengcheng (CHN) 1–4 Sam Craigie (ENG)
- Bai Yulu (CHN) 4–2 Artemijs Žižins (LAT)
- Martin O'Donnell (ENG) 4–1 Sahil Nayyar (CAN)
- Oliver Lines (ENG) 4–1 Stuart Carrington (ENG) (a)
- Ricky Walden (ENG) 2–4 Joe O'Connor (ENG)
- Leone Crowley (IRL) 4–0 Hatem Yassen (EGY)
- Matthew Selt (ENG) 4–0 David Gilbert (ENG)
- Connor Benzey (ENG) 2–4 Iulian Boiko (UKR)
- Lei Peifan (CHN) 4–0 Mateusz Baranowski (POL)
- Long Zehuang (CHN) 4–3 Thepchaiya Un-Nooh (THA)
- Mink Nutcharut (THA) 1–4 Amir Sarkhosh (IRN)
- Lan Yuhao (CHN) 1–4 Reanne Evans (ENG)
- Fan Zhengyi (CHN) 2–4 Robert Milkins (ENG)
- Oliver Brown (ENG) 2–4 Xu Yichen (CHN)
- Anthony McGill (SCO) 4–3 Dylan Emery (WAL)
- Robbie Williams (ENG) 1–4 Bulcsú Révész (HUN)
- Zak Surety (ENG) 4–2 Zhao Hanyang (CHN)
- Julien Leclercq (BEL) 2–4 Ben Woollaston (ENG)
- Allan Taylor (ENG) 4–2 Chatchapong Nasa (THA)
- Ian Burns (ENG) 4–1 Michael Holt (ENG)

== Century breaks ==
=== Main stage centuries ===
A total of 63 century breaks were made during the main stage of the tournament in Cheltenham.

- 144 – Gary Wilson
- 141, 105 – Kyren Wilson
- 138 – Ali Carter
- 135, 133, 133, 127, 101 – Zhao Xintong
- 135, 132, 111 – John Higgins
- 135 – Ryan Davies
- 132, 131, 123, 116, 112, 101 – Shaun Murphy
- 132 – Stan Moody
- 131, 128, 109 – Barry Hawkins
- 130, 125, 125, 101 – Zhang Anda
- 130 – Ian Burns
- 129, 109 – Joe O'Connor
- 127, 123 – Mark Williams
- 127, 123 – Xiao Guodong
- 126 – Zak Surety
- 123, 115, 106 – Mark Selby
- 123 – Liam Davies
- 123 – Ross Muir
- 113 – Ben Mertens
- 109, 105, 104 – Anthony McGill
- 109 – Antoni Kowalski
- 107, 104 – Wu Yize
- 106 – Mark Allen
- 105, 103, 101, 100 – Judd Trump
- 105 – Louis Heathcote
- 104, 100, 100 – Neil Robertson
- 104 – Jak Jones
- 103 – Jiang Jun
- 102 – Patrick Whelan
- 102 – Xu Yichen
- 101 – Iulian Boiko
- 101 – Mitchell Mann
- 100 – Liu Hongyu

=== Qualifying stage centuries ===
A total of 11 century breaks were made during the qualifying stage of the tournament in Leicester.

- 140, 104 – Marco Fu
- 124 – Zhou Yuelong
- 119 – Matthew Stevens
- 118 – Chang Bingyu
- 111 – Ian Burns
- 109 – Bulcsú Révész
- 105 – Artemijs Žižins
- 102 – Stuart Bingham
- 102 – Jak Jones
- 102 – Lei Peifan
