= Zak Surety =

English snooker player (born 1991)

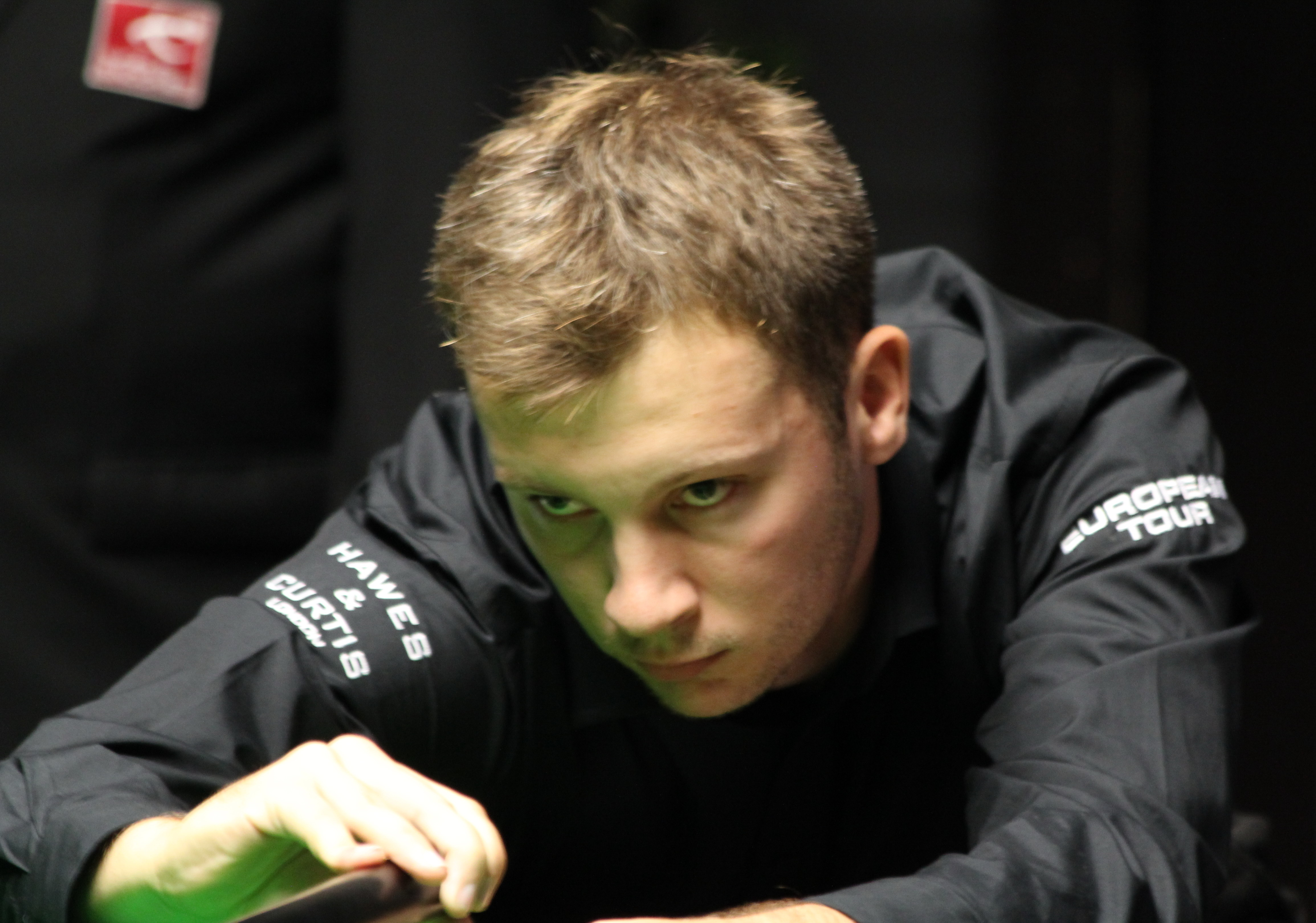
- Surety at the Paul Hunter Classic 2014

Personal information
- Nickname: The Sure Thing
- Born: 4 October 1991 (age 35) Basildon, Essex

Sport
- Country: England
- Sport: Snooker
- Professional: 2014–2016, 2020–present
- Highest ranking: 40 (July 2026)
- Current ranking: 43 (as of 7 November 2026)
- Maximum breaks: 2
- Best ranking finish: Semi-final (2025 World Open)

Zak Surety (born 4 October 1991) is an English professional snooker player.

== Career ==
As an amateur, Surety based in Basildon entered in Players Tour Championship events from their establishment in 2010, with his best result as an amateur being a run to the last 32 stages of the 2012 UKPTC 3, with wins over Jack Lisowski and Oliver Lines in the main stages. Surety also entered Q School in 2011, 2012 and 2013 in the hope of winning a place on the main tour; however, he was unsuccessful, but came close in the second event in 2013, losing 4–1 to Ryan Clark in the final stage. His Q School performances however won him a top up place in four professional ranking events in 2013–14, but he failed to qualify for all four, winning only one match, 5–4 over Patrick Einsle in the 2013 Australian Goldfields Open.

In April 2014, Surety won a place on the professional World Snooker Tour for the 2014–15 and 2015–16 seasons after coming through the EBSA Amateur Cup play-offs with wins over Michael Tomlinson and Michael Georgiou, both 4–1.

=== Debut season ===
Surety lost his first five matches as a professional, before beating Mark King 6–3 to qualify for the International Championship where David Gilbert defeated him 6–4 in the first round. He was knocked out in the first round of the UK Championship and Welsh Open by Michael Holt and Graeme Dott respectively but qualified for the China Open by seeing off Li Hang 5–4. Surety won three frames in a row to beat Joe Swail 5–4 to reach the last 32 of a ranking event for the first time and quickly raced into a 4–1 lead over Robert Milkins. Milkins cut the gap to 4–3, before Surety saw his best chance to win come in the next frame when he opened it with a 65 break, but he went on to lose it and the match in a deciding frame. Milkins apologised to Surety for his behaviour during the match afterwards. Surety's debut campaign ended with a 10–8 defeat to Zhou Yuelong in the first round of World Championship qualifying, which saw him placed 97th in the world rankings.

=== 2015/2016 season ===
All players on the snooker tour receive entry to the first round of the UK Championship and Welsh Open, these were the only events Surety could reach in the 2015–16 season. He lost 6–4 to Jack Lisowski in the first round of the UK and 4–1 to Joe Swail in the first round of the Welsh. Surety dropped off the tour after being unable to break into the top 64 in the world rankings during his two-year stay and he entered Q School in an attempt to win his place back. In the second event he lost 4–1 in the final round to David John, but he would gain entry in to some events next season as a top-up player due to his high Q School Order of Merit ranking.

=== 2016/2017 season ===
4–2 and 4–1 victories over Kyren Wilson and Antony Parsons saw Surety qualify for the European Masters and he was knocked out 4–1 by Liang Wenbo in the first round. He reached the second round of the Northern Ireland Open by beating Darryl Hill 4–3, but lost 4–2 to Hossein Vafaei. Surety dropped off the tour at the end of the year after failing to progress through Q School.

=== 2023/2024 season ===
In March 2024 Surety made a maximum break during his match with Ding Junhui at the World Open, the first 147 of his career in any competition.

== Performance and rankings timeline ==
Tournament	2010/ 11	2011/ 12	2012/ 13	2013/ 14	2014/ 15	2015/ 16	2016/ 17	2020/ 21	2021/ 22	2022/ 23	2023/ 24	2024/ 25	2025/ 26	2026/ 27
Ranking (Note: It shows the ranking at the beginning of the season)	(Note: He was an amateur)				(Note: New players don't have a ranking)	97			85	(Note: Players qualified through Q School started the season without ranking points)	78	(Note: Players qualified One Year Ranking List started the season without ranking points)	65	42
Ranking Tournaments
Championship League	Non-Ranking Event							RR	RR	RR	RR	RR	RR	2R
China Open	A	A	A	A	2R	LQ	A	Tournament Not Held						LQ
Wuhan Open	Tournament Not Held										LQ	2R	1R	LQ
British Open	Tournament Not Held								1R	LQ	1R	LQ	2R	1R
English Open	Tournament Not Held						1R	1R	LQ	LQ	LQ	2R	1R	1R
Shenzhen Open (Note: The event was called the Xi'an Grand Prix (2024/2025–2025/2026))	Tournament Not Held											1R	LQ	2R
Northern Ireland Open	Tournament Not Held						1R	2R	LQ	1R	1R	LQ	1R	LQ
International Championship	Not Held		A	A	1R	LQ	A	Not Held			LQ	WD	QF	LQ
UK Championship	A	A	A	A	1R	1R	A	1R	1R	LQ	LQ	LQ	LQ	
Shoot Out	Non-Ranking Event						1R	1R	2R	1R	3R	2R	2R	
Scottish Open	Not Held		MR	Not Held			A	3R	LQ	1R	1R	LQ	3R	LQ
German Masters	A	A	A	LQ	LQ	LQ	LQ	LQ	LQ	LQ	3R	LQ	LQ	LQ
Welsh Open	A	A	A	A	1R	1R	A	1R	1R	LQ	1R	LQ	LQ	
World Grand Prix	Tournament Not Held				NR	DNQ	DNQ	DNQ	DNQ	DNQ	DNQ	DNQ	DNQ	
Players Championship (Note: The event was called the Players Tour Championship Grand Final (2010/2011–2015/2016))	DNQ	DNQ	DNQ	DNQ	DNQ	DNQ	DNQ	DNQ	DNQ	DNQ	DNQ	DNQ	DNQ	
World Open	A	A	A	A	Not Held		A	Not Held			LQ	SF	1R	
Tour Championship	Tournament Not Held							DNQ	DNQ	DNQ	DNQ	DNQ	DNQ	
World Championship	A	A	A	A	LQ	LQ	A	LQ	LQ	LQ	LQ	1R	LQ	
Former ranking tournaments
Wuxi Classic	Non-Ranking		A	LQ	LQ	Tournament Not Held								
Australian Goldfields Open	A	A	A	LQ	LQ	LQ	Tournament Not Held							
Riga Masters (Note: The event was called the Riga Open (2014/2015–2015/2016))	Tournament Not Held				Minor-Ranking		LQ	Tournament Not Held						
Indian Open	Not Held			LQ	LQ	NH	A	Tournament Not Held						
Paul Hunter Classic	Minor-Ranking Event						LQ	Tournament Not Held						
Shanghai Masters	A	A	A	A	LQ	LQ	LQ	Not Held			Non-Ranking Event			
WST Pro Series	Tournament Not Held							RR	Tournament Not Held					
Turkish Masters	Tournament Not Held								WD	Tournament Not Held				
Gibraltar Open	Tournament Not Held					MR	1R	1R	A	Tournament Not Held				
WST Classic	Tournament Not Held									1R	Tournament Not Held			
European Masters	Tournament Not Held						1R	1R	LQ	LQ	2R	Not Held		
Saudi Arabia Masters	Tournament Not Held											2R	2R	NH
Former non-ranking tournaments
Six-red World Championship	A	NH	A	A	A	A	A	Not Held		LQ	Tournament Not Held			

Performance Table Legend
LQ	lost in the qualifying draw	#R	lost in the early rounds of the tournament (WR = Wildcard round, RR = Round robin)	QF	lost in the quarter-finals
SF	lost in the semi-finals	F	lost in the final	W	won the tournament
DNQ	did not qualify for the tournament	A	did not participate in the tournament	WD	withdrew from the tournament

NH / Not Held	means an event was not held.
NR / Non-Ranking Event	means an event is/was no longer a ranking event.
R / Ranking Event	means an event is/was a ranking event.
MR / Minor-Ranking Event	means an event is/was a minor-ranking event.
