= Sahil Nayyar =

Canadian snooker player (born 1993)

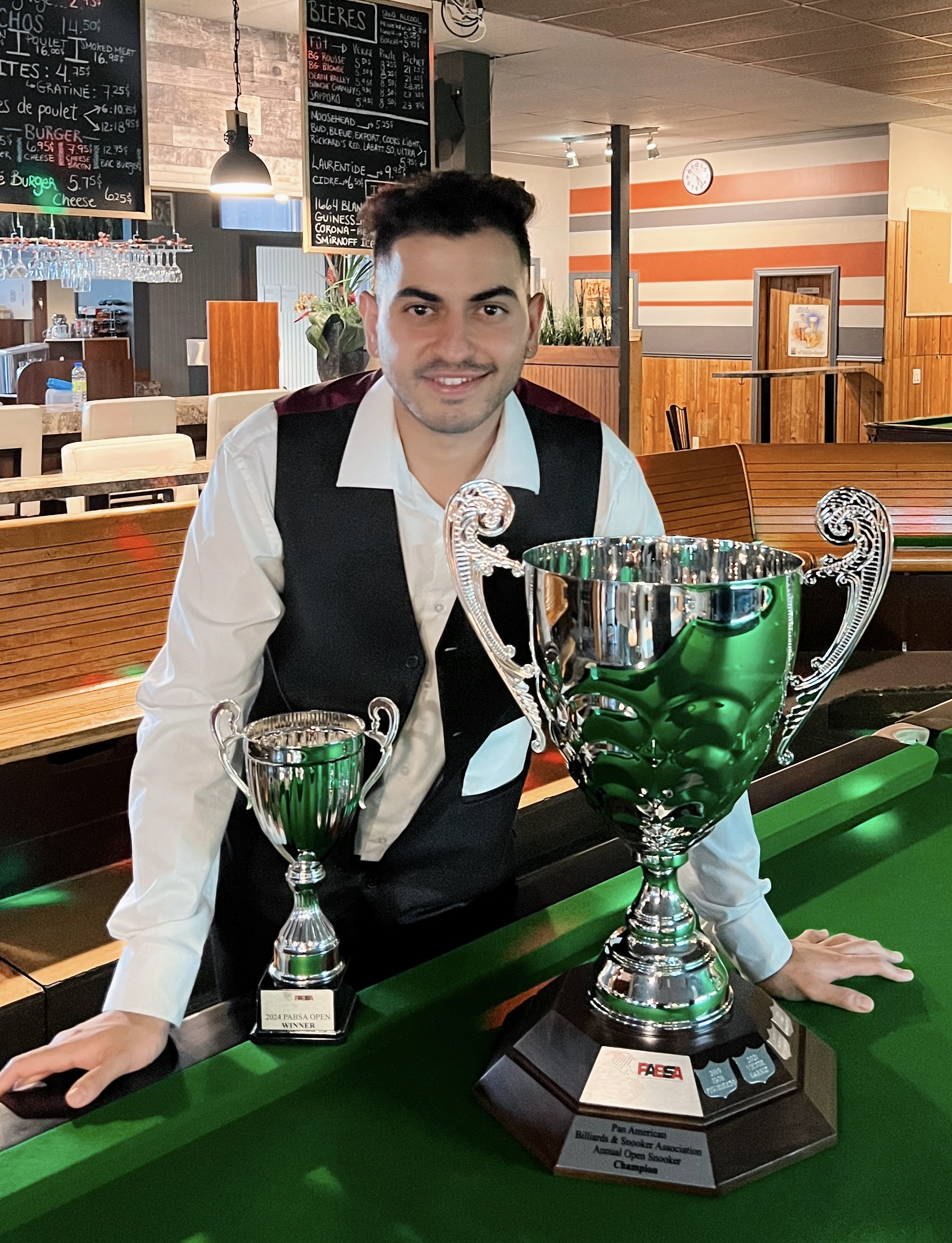
- Sahil Nayyar pictured with the Pan American Trophy

Personal information
- Born: 29 September 1993 (age 33) Ludhiana, India

Sport
- Country: Canada
- Sport: Snooker
- Professional: 2025–present
- Highest ranking: 93 (August 2026)
- Current ranking: 110 (as of 7 November 2026)
- Best ranking finish: Last 64 (2025 Snooker Shoot Out)

Sahil Nayyar (born 29 September 1993) is a professional snooker player. Representing Canada, he won the 2024 Pan American Championship to earn a place on the World Snooker Tour from the 2025-26 snooker season.

== Career ==
He won the Ontario Challenge Series in December 2022, also scoring the highest break of the tournament; 124. That year, he was a member of the winning team at the Snooker Canada World Cup Team Championship.

In October 2024, he defeated Brazil’s Fabio Anderson Luersen 5-1 in the final of the 2024 Pan American Open Snooker Championship. He had reached the final with back-to-back whitewash victories over Andy McCloskey and Floyd Ziegler. With the win, Nayyar earned a two-year World Snooker Tour (WST) tour card starting from the 2025-26 snooker season.

=== 2025–26 season ===
On his debut tournament as a professional he was drawn against Welshman Matthew Stevens at the 2025 Wuhan Open. At his second tournament, the 2025 British Open, with qualifiers also played in June 2025, he was drawn against Martin O'Donnell. He earned a 2-2 draw against Dylan Emery on 17 July 2025 in the 2025 Championship League. Nayyar recorded his first win as a professional against a wild card entrant at the 2025 Saudi Arabia Snooker Masters in August. He recorded his second on 11 December 2025 against Antoni Kowalski at the 2025 Snooker Shoot Out. In April, he recorded a 10-6 loss against Ian Burns in the first round of qualifying for the 2026 World Snooker Championship.

=== 2026–27 season ===
In June 2026, Nayyar recorded a 6-1 win over Liu Yang in the qualifying rounds of the 2026 China Open. That month, he also recorded a win against Fergal Quinn in the first qualifying round of the 2026 Wuhan Open.

== Personal life ==
He was born in city Ludhiana, in Punjab and started playing snooker at the age of 14 years-old. He moved to Canada in 2018 and studied Global Business Management and Global Hospitality Management at Conestoga College in Kitchener, Ontario. He is married.

== Performance and rankings timeline ==
Tournament	2025/ 26	2026/ 27
Ranking (Note: It shows the ranking at the beginning of the season)	(Note: New players on the Main Tour don't have a ranking)	96
Ranking tournaments
Championship League	RR	RR
China Open	NH	LQ
Wuhan Open	LQ	LQ
British Open	LQ	LQ
English Open	LQ	LQ
Shenzhen Open (Note: The event was called the Xi'an Grand Prix (2025/2026))	LQ	LQ
Northern Ireland Open	LQ	LQ
International Championship	LQ	LQ
UK Championship	LQ	LQ
Shoot Out	2R	
Scottish Open	LQ	
German Masters	LQ	
Welsh Open	LQ	
World Grand Prix	DNQ	
Players Championship	DNQ	
World Open	LQ	
Tour Championship	DNQ	
World Championship	LQ	
Former ranking tournaments
Saudi Arabia Masters	2R	NH

Performance Table Legend
LQ	lost in the qualifying draw	#R	lost in the early rounds of the tournament (WR = Wildcard round, RR = Round robin)	QF	lost in the quarter-finals
SF	lost in the semi-finals	F	lost in the final	W	won the tournament
DNQ	did not qualify for the tournament	A	did not participate in the tournament	WD	withdrew from the tournament

NH / Not Held	means an event was not held.
NR / Non-Ranking Event	means an event is/was no longer a ranking event.
R / Ranking Event	means an event is/was a ranking event.
MR / Minor-Ranking Event	means an event is/was a minor-ranking event.

== Career finals ==
=== Amateur finals: 2 (2 titles) ===
Outcome	No.	Year	Championship	Opponent in the final	Score
Winner	1.	2024	Pan American Amateur Championship	(Brazil) Fabio Anderson Luersen	5–1
Winner	2.	2025	Canadian Amateur Championship	(Canada) Alan Whitfield	5–2
