= 2025 Wuhan Open (snooker) =

Snooker tournament

2025 Optics Valley of China Wuhan Open

Tournament information
- Dates: 24–30 August 2025
- Venue: Optics Valley Gymnasium, Huazhong University of Science and Technology
- City: Wuhan
- Country: China
- Organisation: World Snooker Tour
- Format: Ranking event
- Total prize fund: £700,000
- Winner's share: £140,000
- Highest break: Xiao Guodong (CHN) (147); Thepchaiya Un-Nooh (THA) (147)
- Defending champion: Xiao Guodong (CHN)

Final
- Champion: Xiao Guodong (CHN)
- Runner-up: Gary Wilson (ENG)
- Score: 10–9

The 2025 Wuhan Open (officially the 2025 Optics Valley of China Wuhan Open) was a professional snooker tournament that took place from 24 to 30 August 2025 at the Optics Valley Gymnasium, Huazhong University of Science and Technology in Wuhan, China. The qualifiers took place from 22 to 24 June at the Leicester Arena in Leicester, England. The third consecutive edition of the tournament since it was first staged in 2023, it was the third ranking event of the 2025–26 snooker season, following the 2025 Saudi Arabia Snooker Masters and preceding the 2025 English Open. The tournament was broadcast by local channels in China and elsewhere in Asia; by Discovery+ and HBO Max in Europe; by TNT Sports and Discovery+ in the United Kingdom and Ireland; and by WST Play in all other territories. The winner received £140,000 from a total prize fund of £700,000.

Luca Brecel, the 2023 World Champion, failed to appear for his qualifying match in Leicester. Neil Robertson and Ronnie O'Sullivan, the world numbers three and four, withdrew from the event before the main stage in Wuhan, as did Ryan Day. Xiao Guodong was the defending champion, having defeated Si Jiahui 10–7 in the 2024 final. Xiao retained the title, defeating Gary Wilson 10–9 in the final to win the second ranking tournament of his professional career. The fourth player to retain his maiden ranking title—after John Parrott, Mark Allen, and Gary Wilson—he advanced to a career high of eighth in the world rankings following his win. By reaching the final, Wilson re-entered the top 16, while Shaun Murphy fell out of the top 16 for the first time in 19 years.

The tournament produced 90 century breaks—29 in the qualifiers held in Leicester and 61 at the main stage in Wuhan—of which the highest were two maximum breaks. Xiao made the second maximum of his career during his held-over qualifying match against Mink Nutcharut, and Thepchaiya Un-Nooh made the sixth maximum of his career in his last-64 match against Pang Junxu. The maximums were respectively the sixth and seventh of the season and the 223rd and 224th official maximums in professional snooker history.

== Overview ==
The tournament was the third consecutive edition of the Wuhan Open, which was first held in 2023. The inaugural champion was Judd Trump, who won the 2023 event with a 10–7 victory over Ali Carter. The defending champion was Xiao Guodong, who won the first ranking tournament of his professional career at the 2024 edition, defeating Si Jiahui 10–7 in the final.

The main stage of the event took place from 24 to 30 August 2025 at the Optics Valley Gymnasium, Huazhong University of Science and Technology, in Wuhan, China. Qualifiers were held from 22 to 24 June at the Leicester Arena in Leicester, England. The tournament was the third ranking event of the 2025–26 snooker season, following the 2025 Saudi Arabia Snooker Masters and preceding the 2025 English Open.

=== Participants ===
The tournament featured a total of 128 entrants, with four places reserved for Chinese wildcard players. Luca Brecel, the 2023 World Champion, did not appear for his qualifying match against Haris Tahir, who received a walkover. Qualifying matches featuring the defending champion Xiao Guodong, the reigning World Champion Zhao Xintong, Judd Trump, Ronnie O'Sullivan, the highest ranked Chinese player (Ding Junhui), and the four Chinese wildcards (Tang Hewen, Wang Xinbo, Zhang Hao, and Zhou Jinhao) were held over to be played in Wuhan. O'Sullivan withdrew for medical reasons and was replaced in the draw by the German amateur Umut Dikme, the highest ranked player from the Q School Order of Merit. Neil Robertson and Ryan Day won their qualifying matches in Leicester but subsequently withdrew from the main stage in Wuhan. Their respective opponents, Reanne Evans and Jack Lisowski, received walkovers to the last 32.

=== Format ===
All matches up to and including the quarter-finals were played as the best of nine frames. The semi-finals were the best of 11 frames, and the final was the best of 19 frames, played over two sessions.

=== Broadcasters ===
The qualifying round was broadcast domestically in mainland China by the CBSA‑WPBSA Academy WeChat Channel, the CBSA‑WPBSA Academy Douyin, Huya Live and Migu. In the rest of the world, qualifying was streamed for free by WST Play. The same broadcasters carried the main stage of the tournament in mainland China. The main stage was broadcast by TNT Sports and Discovery+ in the United Kingdom and Ireland; by Discovery+ in Germany, Italy, and Austria and by HBO Max in other European territories; by Now TV in Hong Kong; by Astro SuperSport in Malaysia & Brunei; by TrueSports in Thailand; and by Sportcast in Taiwan. In territories where no other coverage was available, it was streamed by WST Play.

=== Prize fund ===
The breakdown of prize money for the event is shown below:

- Winner: £140,000
- Runner-up: £63,000
- Semi-final: £30,000
- Quarter-final: £16,000
- Last 16: £12,000
- Last 32: £8,000
- Last 64: £4,500
- Highest break: £5,000
- Total: £700,000

== Summary ==
=== Qualifiers ===
In the qualifiers held at the Leicester Arena from 22 to 24 June 2025, Class of '92 players Mark Williams and John Higgins, both of whom had recently turned 50, began their 34th professional season with wins. Williams recorded a whitewash over Chatchapong Nasa while Higgins defeated Huang Jiahao 5–2. Reanne Evans, a 12-time World Women's Champion, trailed David Lilley, a former World Seniors Champion, by two frames at 1–3, but she recovered to win the match in a deciding frame. The previous year's runner-up, Si Jiahui, defeated Bulcsú Révész 5–2. Joe O'Connor and Elliot Slessor both recovered from 2–4 behind to beat their respective opponents, Jiang Jun and Oliver Lines, in deciding frames, with Slessor winning his decider on the last pink and black. The world number 70 Louis Heathcote defeated the world number 20 Wu Yize 5–2.

Also in Leicester, Shaun Murphy and Neil Robertson both recorded whitewash victories over tour debutants as Murphy defeated 14-year-old Michał Szubarczyk, the youngest player ever to turn professional, and Robertson beat 19-year-old Leone Crowley. Robertson subsequently withdrew from the tournament, as did another successful qualifier, Ryan Day. Artemijs Žižins defeated He Guoqiang 5–1, while Chang Bingyu recovered from 1–4 behind to beat Daniel Wells in a decider. Veteran player Jimmy White made four breaks over 70 as he beat Anthony McGill 5–2, while Marco Fu made century breaks of 120, 136, and 113 as he defeated the world number 16 Chris Wakelin. Fu's performance contributed to his receiving the inaugural Player of the Month award from the WPBSA Players organisation.

In the held-over qualifiers played in Wuhan, the defending champion Xiao Guodong made the second maximum break of his professional career in the fourth frame of his whitewash victory over Mink Nutcharut. "To make a 147 here today, and my first ever maximum break in China, was really special," said Xiao afterwards. The reigning World Champion Zhao Xintong attempted a maximum in his held-over qualifier against Iulian Boiko but missed the last pink to end the break on 134. Zhao made two other century breaks of 122 and 132 as he won the match 5–3. Judd Trump, the world number one, made a 130 break in his 5–1 win over Farakh Ajaib. Three of the four Chinese wildcard players lost their qualifying matches, with only Wang Xinbo progressing to the last 64.

=== Last 64 ===
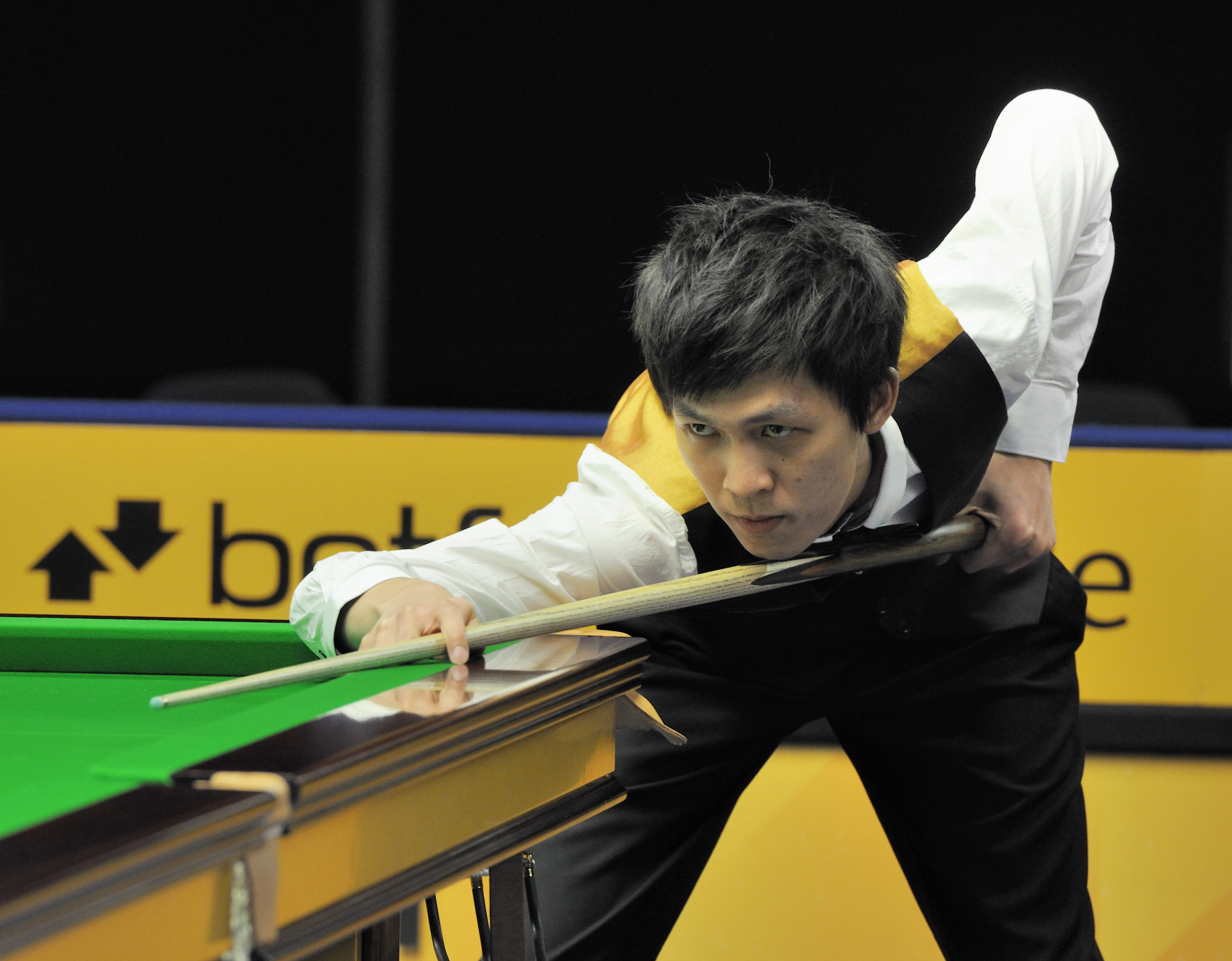
Thepchaiya Un-Nooh (pictured in 2013) made the sixth maximum break of his career and his second of the season.

Williams won the first three frames against 19-year-old Liam Davies with consecutive century breaks of 125, 100, and 137 and also took the fourth for a 4–0 lead. Davies attempted a comeback, making breaks including 61 and 94 as he won three consecutive frames, but Williams secured a 5–3 victory with a 70 break in frame eight. Williams praised his opponent afterwards, saying: "He never threw the towel in and he made some great breaks to get to 4–3." Barry Hawkins won a deciding frame on the colours to defeat Jamie Jones. Five of Hawkins's last eight professional matches had gone to deciding frames, including 5–6 losses to Ronnie O'Sullivan at the 2025 Shanghai Masters and Wakelin at the 2025 Saudi Arabia Snooker Masters. "I felt all over the place and had no confidence at all," he said afterwards. "Every ball felt like a pint of blood. What I do is just battle and battle." Mark Selby advanced with a 5–2 win over Michael Holt. Fu also progressed, defeating White by the same score.

Thepchaiya Un-Nooh defeated Pang Junxu 5–1, making the sixth maximum break of his career in the final frame of the match. It was Un-Nooh's second maximum of the season, following his 147 at the 2025 Saudi Arabia Snooker Masters. "When I arrived in Wuhan I made two on the practice tables," said Un-Nooh afterwards. "That gave me a lot of confidence to make one. Everything was open and the balls were perfect. I knew I could do it like I did when I was practising." The maximums by Xiao and Un-Nooh at the event were the sixth and seventh of the season and the 223rd and 224th in professional snooker history. The world number seven Ding Junhui made a 117 break to win the first frame against 18-year-old Stan Moody, the world number 61. However, Moody made breaks of 64, 65, 53, and 131 as he won five of the next seven frames for a 5–3 victory. "It was a fantastic experience," said Moody, commenting on playing a Chinese favourite. "I knew what it would be like, with the crowd clapping every shot. When he got flukes they were cheering. I tried to enjoy it, view myself as the underdog and take the pressure off." Higgins advanced with a 5–1 win over Dylan Emery but commented afterwards that he was "struggling for motivation" after celebrating his 50th birthday with a summer holiday in Dallas. Aaron Hill, a quarter-finalist at the 2023 edition, advanced with a 5–2 victory over Kyren Wilson, the world number two. "[Wilson] is probably the best player in the world at the moment, so I knew I had to play my best snooker to win and I did that," commented Hill afterwards. Trump defeated Liu Hongyu 5–1, and Murphy whitewashed Jordan Brown.

=== Last 32 ===
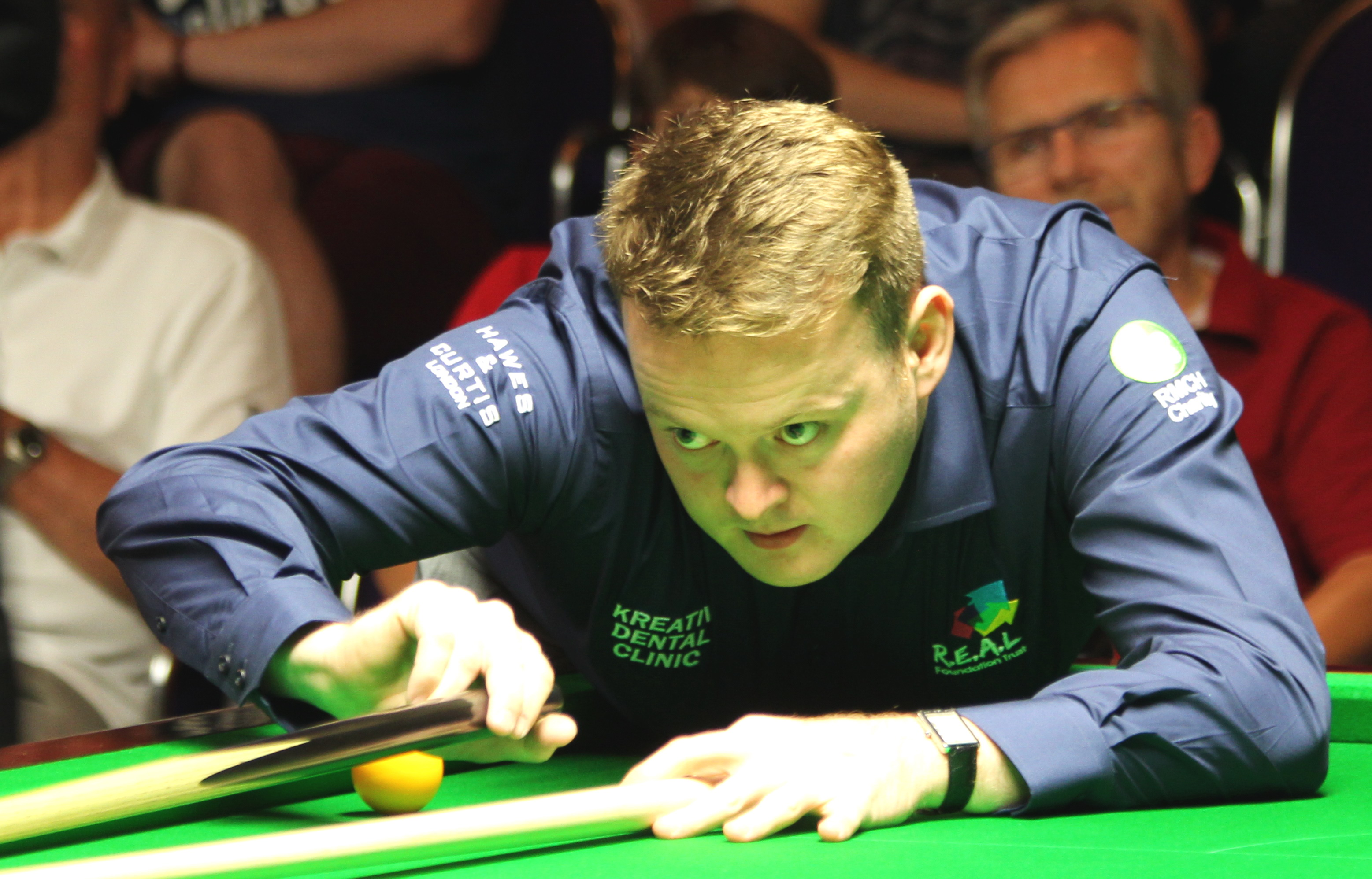
Shaun Murphy (pictured in 2015) lost to Gary Wilson in the last 32. He fell to 17th in the world rankings, after spending 19 continuous years in the top 16.

Following his win over Ding in the last 64, Moody made four half-century breaks as he defeated Zhou Yuelong 5–1. Since the 2024 Players Championship, every player who had defeated Ding in a professional event had lost in the following round—a phenomenon that had extended over 18 months and 22 tournaments, becoming known as the "Ding curse." After ending the "curse" with his victory over Zhou, Moody commented: "I got over the line so I'm happy with that. [The Ding curse] was definitely playing on my mind, so I had to just focus and get on with it." Selby made three half-centuries as he defeated David Gilbert 5–2, while Williams made breaks of 129 and 95 as he secured a 5–1 victory over O'Connor. The defending champion Xiao reached the last 16 with a 5–3 win over David Grace, and Si defeated Jackson Page by the same score. Hill advanced by beating Lei Peifan 5–4, making a break of 77 to win the deciding frame.

Stephen Maguire, winner of the season's first ranking event at the 2025 Championship League, trailed Zhao 3–4 but made a century of 119 to force a deciding frame. While potting the frame ball red in the decider, Zhao committed a foul by cannoning the brown and knocking it into the pocket. Maguire later made a break of 45 and won the match on the last black. "I just had a funny feeling, because he had that massive bit of bad luck, I'd get a chance," said Maguire afterwards. "I was getting myself up for it if I got a chance, thinking please clear up. Thankfully I managed to do it." Trump recorded a 5–3 victory over Lisowski, his ninth consecutive win against him, and said afterwards: "It has been a bit of a struggle [for Lisowski] the last couple of seasons, with some terrible luck off the table. I just hope he can turn it around." Gary Wilson beat Murphy, Hawkins defeated Jak Jones, and Higgins won his match against Yuan Sijun, all by 5–3 scorelines. Matthew Selt defeated Fu 5–1, and Tom Ford beat Evans by the same score. Zhang Anda advanced with a whitewash victory over Chang. Mark Allen came from 3–4 behind to defeat Hossein Vafaei, making a 52 break to tie the scores and a century of 106 to win the deciding frame. Un-Nooh also advanced to the last 16 by beating Scott Donaldson 5–2.

=== Last 16 ===
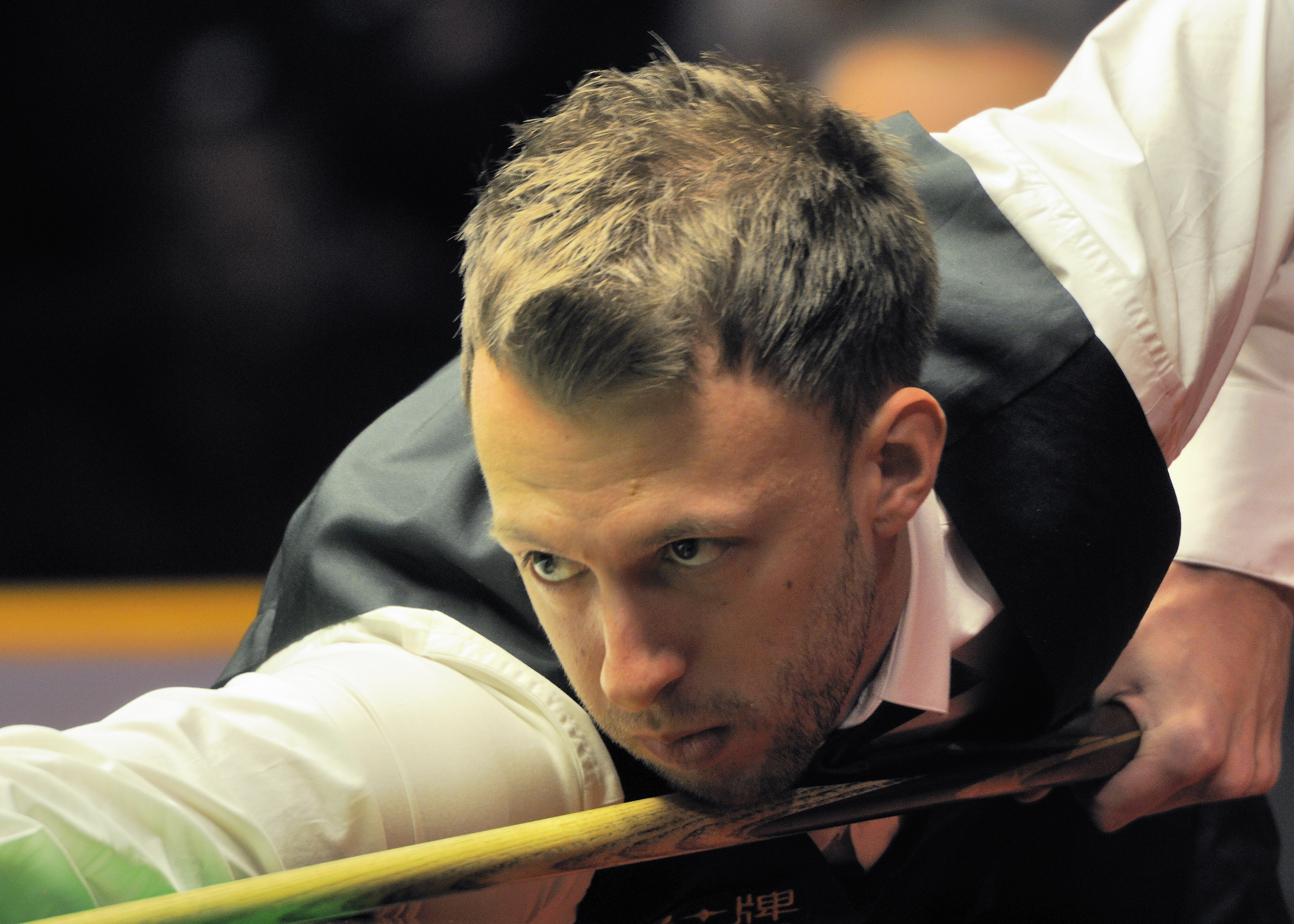
Judd Trump (pictured in 2014), the world number one, lost in a deciding frame to Gary Wilson. It was Wilson's first victory over Trump in seven years.

Moody made breaks including 108, 87, and 54 and scored 431 points without reply as he whitewashed Hawkins in 57 minutes. Having failed on three previous occasions to get past the last-16 stage of a ranking event, Moody reached his maiden ranking quarter-final, also becoming the first British teenager in 11 years to reach the last eight of a ranking tournament. "It's the best win of my career," he said afterwards. "I played very, very well. I was in the zone. I don't know what happened really, I just potted everything." Williams won the first three frames against Selby. Selby recovered to tie the scores at 3–3, but Williams made breaks of 63 and 68 to secure a 5–3 victory and reach his 118th ranking quarter-final. "I'm especially pleased the way I finished off," Williams said afterwards. "It was two good breaks from 3–3. He was probably looking the stronger player at that point." Hill made a 137 break to win the first frame against Zhang, but Zhang won three consecutive frames to lead 3–1 at the mid-session interval. Hill took three in a row to lead 4–3, but Zhang made a 63 break to tie the scores and went on to win the deciding frame. Xiao made a century break of 136 during his 5–2 win over Selt.

Trump led Gary Wilson 4–3, but Wilson tied the scores and then won the decider to record his first victory over Trump in seven years, having last beaten him at the 2018 World Open. "I'm really happy with the win," Wilson commented afterwards. "It is great to beat [Trump]. Being hyper-critical, there were a few bad mistakes, where a player of [Trump's] class doesn't normally let you off the hook." Higgins defeated Ford 5–1. Allen defeated Un-Nooh by the same score, saying afterwards: "[Un-Nooh] has given me a few hammerings lately. I just had to tighten up a bit and my safety was good there. That created a few chances and I scored well when I needed to." Facing Maguire, Si made breaks of 127 and 113 as he took a 4–1 lead. Maguire attempted a maximum break in frame six, potting 15 reds and 15 blacks, but the break ended at 120. Si went on to win the match 5–2.

=== Quarter-finals ===
Facing Zhang, Williams made a break of 74 to win the opening frame. Zhang took the second, but Williams won four consecutive frames, making breaks including 83 and 60, as he secured a 5–1 victory to reach the 68th ranking semi-final of his professional career. "If you had said to me five years ago I would still be in semi-finals and competing I wouldn't have believed you, but here we still are," commented 50-year-old Williams. "I'm still giving the top players in the world a run for their money. How long it will go on for, I don't know. I just have to enjoy it." Xiao made breaks of 94, 87, and 100 as he defeated Moody 5–2.

Si made breaks including 90 and 51 to lead Allen 3–1 at the mid-session interval. Allen responded with breaks including 109 and 66 to win three consecutive frames for a 4–3 advantage. Si won frame eight, but Allen made a match-winning break of 70 in the deciding frame. "You want to start any season well but it just didn't happen for me [at the Saudi Arabia Snooker Masters] although I played alright in that game," Allen said afterwards. "I wasn't overly gutted, but I've come here having put in a lot of good work on the practice table." Facing Higgins, Wilson made breaks of 85, 90, 128, and 73 as he moved into a 4–2 lead. Higgins won frame seven to reduce his deficit to one frame. The eighth came down to a safety battle on the brown. Higgins went in-off the brown to leave himself requiring snookers, and Wilson went on to take the frame for a 5–3 win.

=== Semi-finals ===
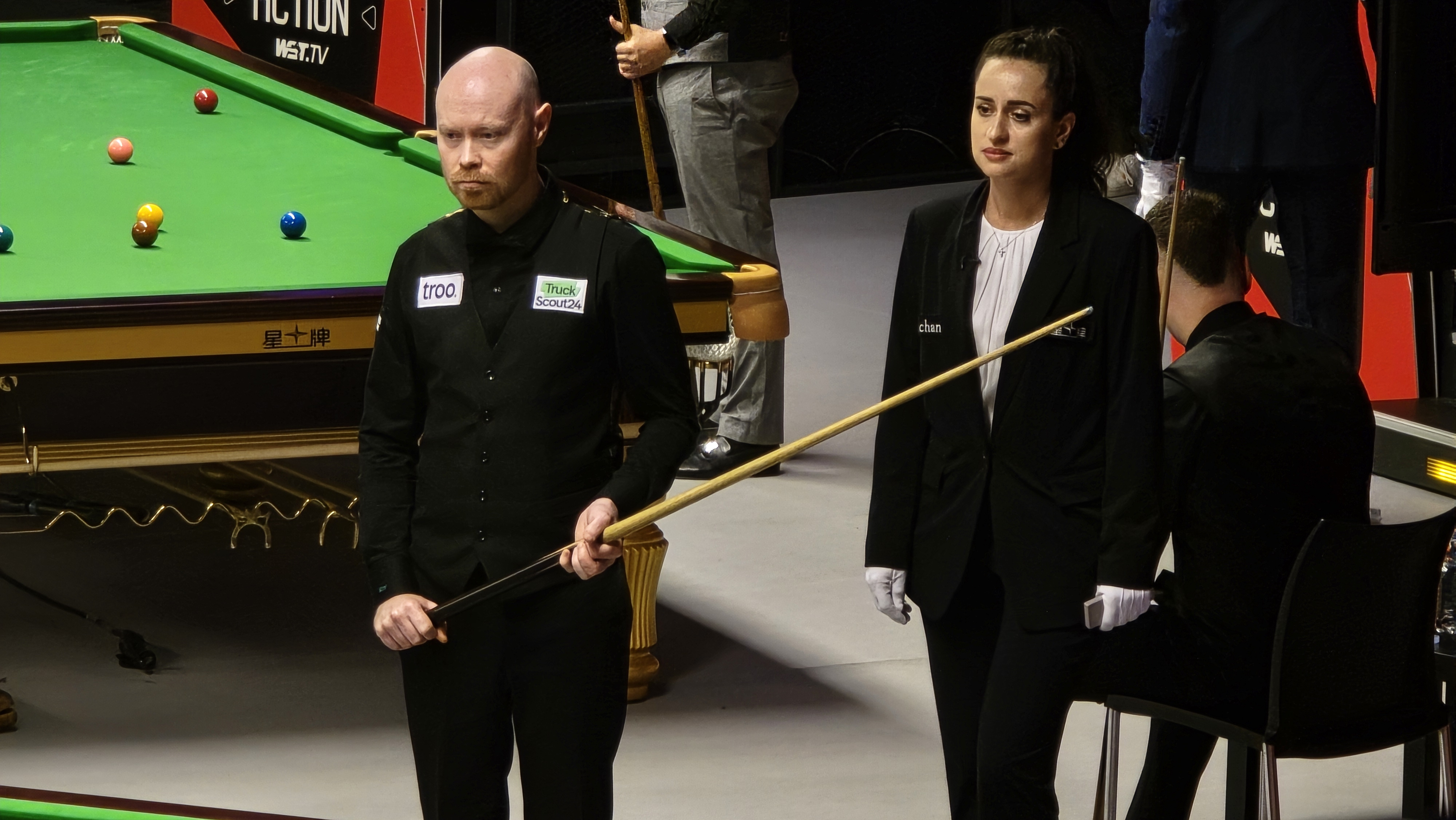
Gary Wilson (pictured in 2025) defeated Mark Allen 6–3 to reach the final. He re-entered the top 16 after the event.

The semi-finals were played on 29 August as the best of 11 frames. In the first semi-final between Williams and Xiao, the scores were tied at 2–2 at the mid-session interval. Williams made a break of 75 to win the fifth frame and move 3–2 ahead, but Xiao took the 27-minute sixth frame to tie the scores and made an 80 break in frame seven to go 4–3 in front. Xiao also won frame eight and came from 58 points behind in the ninth to secure a 6–3 victory with a break of 68. "My focus really improved after 3–3," Xiao said afterwards. "I told myself that even though my scoring wasn't great today, I needed to concentrate fully on the cue ball control on every single shot. Even in the final clearance, I wasn't nervous. I just tried to treat it as a normal situation and stay relaxed."

Facing Allen in the other semi-final, Wilson made a 77 break to win the opening frame. Allen responded with breaks of 135 and 66 to win the next two, but Wilson made breaks including 53, 113, 78, and 70 as he took a 5–2 lead. Allen led in frame eight, but Wilson produced a break of 25 to leave Allen requiring snookers on the pink. Allen could not obtain the foul points he required, and Wilson won his fifth consecutive frame to secure a 6–2 win. Wilson's semi-final victory ensured that he would re-enter the top 16 in the world rankings after the event. "I've beat some fantastic players this week, but you aren't looking at who it is really," Wilson said afterwards. "You are just trying to play your own game. If you can do that as a professional, then you have a chance of beating anyone. It is then about holding yourself together." Wilson's advance into the top 16 meant that Murphy fell to 17th place in the rankings after the tournament, ending his 19-year continuous tenure within the top 16, which he had first entered in the 2006–07 world rankings.

=== Final ===
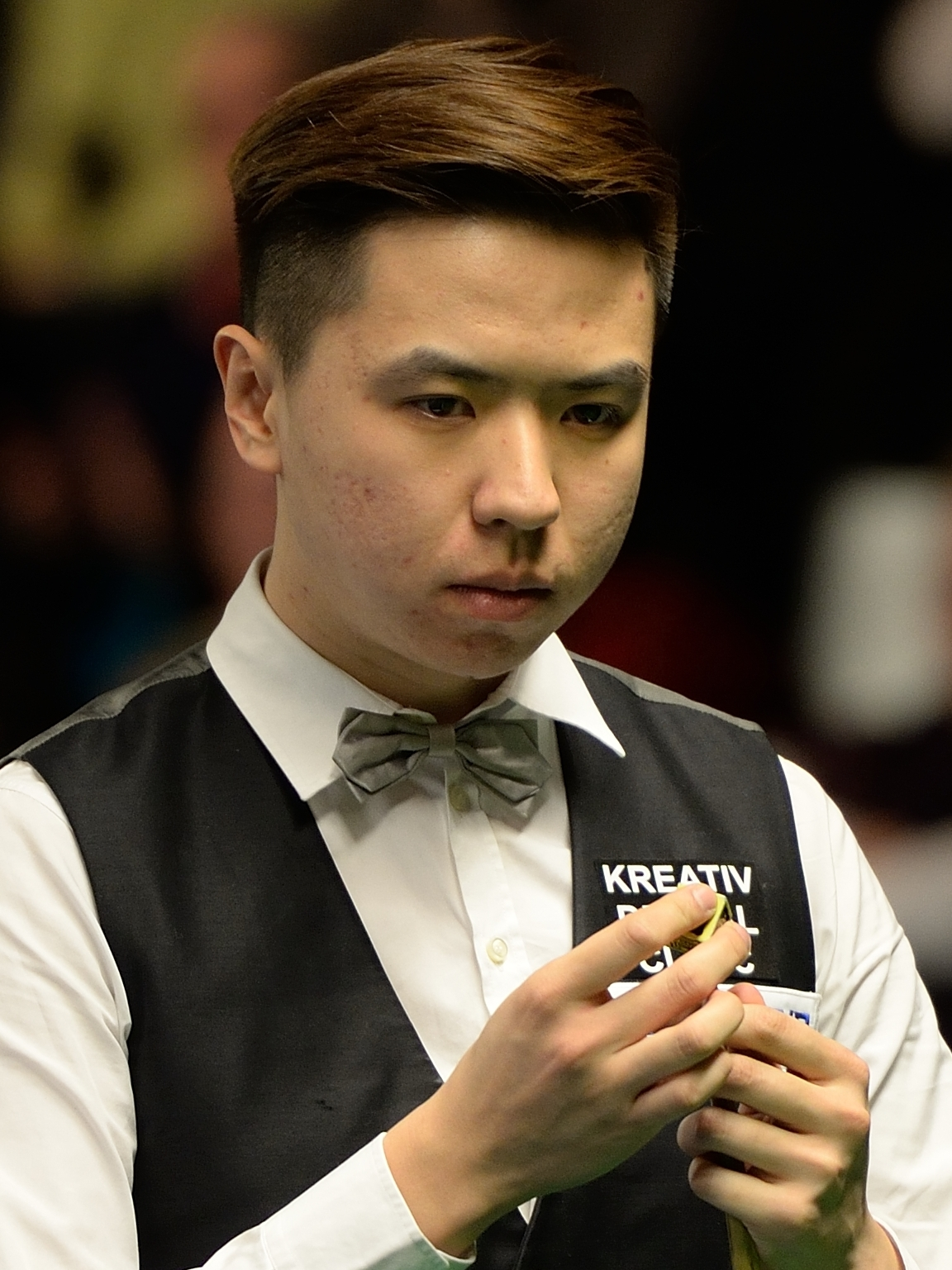
The defending champion Xiao Guodong (pictured in 2015) made his second official maximum break in the qualifiers. He retained the title, defeating Gary Wilson 10–9 in the final.

The final was played on 30 August as the best of 19 frames, held over two sessions, between the world number 14 and defending champion Xiao and the world number 18 Wilson. Xiao was attempting to win the second ranking title of his career, while Wilson was attempting to win his fourth. Both players had waited extended periods before their first ranking wins: Xiao had been a professional for 17 years before winning his maiden ranking title at the 2024 Wuhan Open, while Wilson had played on the professional tour for 18 years before his first ranking success at the 2022 Scottish Open. Xiao won the opening two frames of the final, but Wilson responded to take the next three with breaks including 52 and 96. Xiao won the next three frames to lead 5–3, but Wilson took the last of the session with a century break of 116 to leave Xiao one in front at 5–4.

When play resumed for the second session, Wilson made a second consecutive century, a break of 118, to win the 10th frame, tying the scores at 5–5. Xiao took frame 11, but Wilson won three consecutive frames with breaks of 73, 102, and 56 to lead 8–6. Xiao made breaks including 103 and 90 as he won three in a row to move one from victory at 9–8, but Wilson forced a deciding frame with a 52 break. After Xiao made a break of 48 in the decider, Wilson had a scoring opportunity but he missed a pot on a red. Xiao secured the frame to win 10–9 and become only the fourth player—after John Parrott, Allen, and Gary Wilson—to retain his maiden ranking title. He advanced from 14th to a career high of 8th in the world rankings.

"Winning a first ranking title is hard, winning a second is even harder," said Xiao afterwards. "I've been a professional for 17, now 18 years, so I'm not a young player anymore. As an experienced player, winning two ranking titles at this stage feels a bit late, but in another way the timing is just right. Over the years I've built up experience, and I think this breakthrough is the result of all the work and the lessons I've learned." As runner-up, Wilson advanced from 18th to 16th in the rankings after the tournament. He said after the final: "[Xiao] having the majority of the support doesn't bring pressure. If anything it should, if you have a competitive nature like I have, spur you on to try and upset that. It didn't happen today. Now that it is finished and there is nothing more I can do about it, I just want to say well done to Xiao. I know how it feels to defend a title and he has done that in his home tournament."

== Main draw ==
The draw for the tournament is shown below. Numbers in parentheses after the players' names denote the top 32 seeded players, an (a) indicates amateur players not on the World Snooker Tour, and players in bold denote match winners.

=== Top half ===
**Last 64**; Best of 9 frames
**Xiao Guodong (CHN) (1)** | **5**
Ishpreet Singh Chadha (IND) | 2
Elliot Slessor (ENG) (29) | 4
**David Grace (ENG)** | **5**
**Marco Fu (HKG)** | **5**
Jimmy White (ENG) | 2
Louis Heathcote (ENG) | 2
**Matthew Selt (ENG)** | **5**
Xu Si (CHN) | 3
**Jak Jones (WAL) (21)** | **5**
Jamie Jones (WAL) | 4
**Barry Hawkins (ENG) (11)** | **5**
Noppon Saengkham (THA) | 1
**Zhou Yuelong (CHN) (32)** | **5**
**Stan Moody (ENG)** | **5**
Ding Junhui (CHN) (8) | 3
**Mark Williams (WAL) (5)** | **5**
Liam Davies (WAL) | 3
**Joe O'Connor (ENG) (28)** | **5**
Ben Woollaston (ENG) | 4
**Mark Selby (ENG) (9)** | **5**
Michael Holt (ENG) | 2
**David Gilbert (ENG) (23)** | **5**
Haris Tahir (PAK) | 0
**Chang Bingyu (CHN)** | **5**
Liam Highfield (ENG) | 3
Zhao Hanyang (CHN) | 3
**Zhang Anda (CHN) (13)** | **5**
Jimmy Robertson (ENG) | 3
**Lei Peifan (CHN) (31)** | **5**
**Aaron Hill (IRL)** | **5**
Kyren Wilson (ENG) (4) | 2

**Last 32**; Best of 9 frames
**(China) Xiao Guodong (1)** | **5**
(England) David Grace | 3
(Hong Kong) Marco Fu | 1
**(England) Matthew Selt** | **5**
(Wales) Jak Jones (21) | 3
**(England) Barry Hawkins (11)** | **5**
(China) Zhou Yuelong (32) | 1
**(England) Stan Moody** | **5**
**(Wales) Mark Williams (5)** | **5**
(England) Joe O'Connor (28) | 1
**(England) Mark Selby (9)** | **5**
(England) David Gilbert (23) | 2
(China) Chang Bingyu | 0
**(China) Zhang Anda (13)** | **5**
(China) Lei Peifan (31) | 4
**(Republic of Ireland) Aaron Hill** | **5**

**Last 16**; Best of 9 frames
**(China) Xiao Guodong (1)** | **5**
(England) Matthew Selt | 2
(England) Barry Hawkins (11) | 0
**(England) Stan Moody** | **5**
**(Wales) Mark Williams (5)** | **5**
(England) Mark Selby (9) | 3
**(China) Zhang Anda (13)** | **5**
(Republic of Ireland) Aaron Hill | 4

**Quarter-finals**; Best of 9 frames
**(China) Xiao Guodong (1)** | **5**
(England) Stan Moody | 2
**(Wales) Mark Williams (5)** | **5**
(China) Zhang Anda (13) | 1

**Semi-finals**; Best of 11 frames
**(China) Xiao Guodong (1)** | **6**
(Wales) Mark Williams (5) | 3

=== Bottom half ===
**Last 64**; Best of 9 frames
**Judd Trump (ENG) (3)** | **5**
Liu Hongyu (CHN) | 1
**Jack Lisowski** (ENG) (25) | **w/o**
Ryan Day (WAL) (Note: Ryan Day withdrew and so Jack Lisowski was given a walkover to the last-32.) | w/d
**Shaun Murphy (ENG) (14)** | **5**
Jordan Brown (NIR) | 0
**Gary Wilson (ENG) (18)** | **5**
Lyu Haotian (CHN) | 0
Haydon Pinhey (ENG) | 2
**Tom Ford (ENG) (19)** | **5**
**Reanne Evans** (ENG) | **w/o**
Neil Robertson (AUS) (10) (Note: Neil Robertson withdrew and so Reanne Evans was given a walkover to the last-32.) | w/d
Artemijs Žižins (LVA) | 2
**Yuan Sijun (CHN) (30)** | **5**
Dylan Emery (WAL) | 1
**John Higgins (SCO) (6)** | **5**
Allan Taylor (ENG) | 2
**Scott Donaldson (SCO)** | **5**
Pang Junxu (CHN) (26) | 1
**Thepchaiya Un-Nooh (THA)** | **5**
**Mark Allen (NIR) (12)** | **5**
Zak Surety (ENG) | 1
**Hossein Vafaei (IRN) (24)** | **5**
Ben Mertens (BEL) | 1
**Jackson Page (WAL)** | **5**
Ali Carter (ENG) (17) | 3
Wang Yuchen (HKG) | 0
**Si Jiahui (CHN) (15)** | **5**
Wang Xinbo (CHN) (a) | 3
**Stephen Maguire (SCO) (27)** | **5**
Matthew Stevens (WAL) | 3
**Zhao Xintong (CHN) (2)** | **5**

**Last 32**; Best of 9 frames
**(England) Judd Trump (3)** | **5**
(England) Jack Lisowski (25) | 3
(England) Shaun Murphy (14) | 3
**(England) Gary Wilson (18)** | **5**
**(England) Tom Ford (19)** | **5**
(England) Reanne Evans | 1
(China) Yuan Sijun (30) | 3
**(Scotland) John Higgins (6)** | **5**
(Scotland) Scott Donaldson | 2
**(Thailand) Thepchaiya Un-Nooh** | **5**
**(Northern Ireland) Mark Allen (12)** | **5**
(Iran) Hossein Vafaei (24) | 4
(Wales) Jackson Page | 3
**(China) Si Jiahui (15)** | **5**
**(Scotland) Stephen Maguire (27)** | **5**
(China) Zhao Xintong (2) | 4

**Last 16**; Best of 9 frames
(England) Judd Trump (3) | 4
**(England) Gary Wilson (18)** | **5**
(England) Tom Ford (19) | 1
**(Scotland) John Higgins (6)** | **5**
(Thailand) Thepchaiya Un-Nooh | 1
**(Northern Ireland) Mark Allen (12)** | **5**
**(China) Si Jiahui (15)** | **5**
(Scotland) Stephen Maguire (27) | 2

**Quarter-finals**; Best of 9 frames
**(England) Gary Wilson (18)** | **5**
(Scotland) John Higgins (6) | 3
**(Northern Ireland) Mark Allen (12)** | **5**
(China) Si Jiahui (15) | 4

**Semi-finals**; Best of 11 frames
**(England) Gary Wilson (18)** | **6**
(Northern Ireland) Mark Allen (12) | 2

Note: w/d=withdrawn; w/o=walkover

=== Final: frame scores ===
Final: Best of 19 frames. Referee: Peggy Li; Optics Valley Gymnasium, Wuhan, China, 30 August 2025
| **Xiao Guodong** (1); China | **10**–9 | Gary Wilson (18); England |
Afternoon: **104**–0, **80**–38, 5–**68**, 0–**93**, 12–**96**, **83**–44, **67**–1, **65**–4, 0–**116** (116); Evening: 6–**118** (118), **121**–12, 0–**73**, 1–**114** (102), 28–**98**, **103**–0 (103), **90**–0, **112**–0, 1–**64**, **111**–12
| (frame 15) 103 | Highest break | **118** (frame 10) |
| 1 | Century breaks | **3** |

== Qualifying draw ==
=== Wuhan ===
The results of the held-over qualifying matches played in Wuhan are given below. An (a) indicates amateur players not on the World Snooker Tour.

- Xiao Guodong (CHN) 5–0 Mink Nutcharut (THA)
- Ding Junhui (CHN) 5–1 Zhang Hao (CHN) (a)
- Judd Trump (ENG) 5–1 Farakh Ajaib (PAK)
- Umut Dikme (GER) (a) (Note: Umut Dikme replaced Ronnie O'Sullivan, who withdrew.) 3–5 Allan Taylor (ENG)
- Mark Allen (NIR) 5–2 Tang Hewen (CHN) (a)
- Hossein Vafaei (IRN) 5–2 Zhou Jinhao (CHN) (a)
- Robbie Williams (ENG) 4–5 Wang Xinbo (CHN) (a)
- Zhao Xintong (CHN) 5–3 Iulian Boiko (UKR)

=== Leicester ===
The results of the qualifying matches played in Leicester are given below.

- Ishpreet Singh Chadha (IND) 5–1 Yao Pengcheng (CHN)
- Wu Yize (CHN) 2–5 Louis Heathcote (ENG)
- Matthew Selt (ENG) 5–4 Sunny Akani (THA)
- Jamie Jones (WAL) 5–4 Liu Wenwei (CHN)
- Noppon Saengkham (THA) 5–0 Robbie McGuigan (NIR)
- Zhou Yuelong (CHN) 5–2 Lan Yuhao (CHN)
- Joe O'Connor (ENG) 5–5 Jiang Jun (CHN)
- Elliot Slessor (ENG) 5–4 Oliver Lines (ENG)
- Ricky Walden (ENG) 4–5 David Grace (ENG)
- Luca Brecel (BEL) n/s–w/o Haris Tahir (PAK) (Note: Luca Brecel did not show up for his match with Haris Tahir, so Tahir was given a walkover.)
- Long Zehuang (CHN) 3–5 Dylan Emery (WAL)
- John Higgins (SCO) 5–2 Huang Jiahao (CHN)
- Fan Zhengyi (CHN) 3–5 Ben Mertens (BEL)
- Si Jiahui (CHN) 5–2 Bulcsú Révész (HUN)
- Mark Williams (WAL) 5–0 Chatchapong Nasa (THA)
- Mark Davis (ENG) 4–5 Liam Davies (WAL)
- Michael Holt (ENG) 5–3 Liam Graham (SCO)
- Sanderson Lam (ENG) 1–5 Zhao Hanyang (CHN)
- Jordan Brown (NIR) 5–1 Duane Jones (WAL)
- Martin O'Donnell (ENG) 1–5 Haydon Pinhey (ENG)
- David Lilley (ENG) 4–5 Reanne Evans (ENG)
- Daniel Wells (WAL) 4–5 Chang Bingyu (CHN)
- Zhang Anda (CHN) 5–2 Steven Hallworth (ENG)
- Liu Hongyu (CHN) 5–3 Ian Burns (ENG)
- Gary Wilson (ENG) 5–2 Gao Yang (CHN)
- Lyu Haotian (CHN) 5–3 Bai Yulu (CHN)
- He Guoqiang (CHN) 1–5 Artemijs Žižins (LAT)
- Yuan Sijun (CHN) 5–1 Xu Yichen (CHN)
- Aaron Hill (IRL) 5–1 Sam Craigie (ENG)
- Shaun Murphy (ENG) 5–0 Michał Szubarczyk (POL)
- Neil Robertson (AUS) 5–0 Leone Crowley (IRL)
- Pang Junxu (CHN) 5–4 Hatem Yassen (EGY)
- Thepchaiya Un-Nooh (THA) 5–0 Fergal Quinn (NIR)
- Zak Surety (ENG) 5–1 Gong Chenzhi (CHN)
- Stephen Maguire (SCO) 5–1 Kreishh Gurbaxani (IND)
- Stan Moody (ENG) 5–2 Antoni Kowalski (POL)
- Mark Selby (ENG) 5–1 Alexander Ursenbacher (SWI)
- Jack Lisowski (ENG) 5–3 Amir Sarkhosh (IRN)
- Tom Ford (ENG) 5–2 Mateusz Baranowski (POL)
- Scott Donaldson (SCO) 5–4 Mitchell Mann (ENG)
- Ali Carter (ENG) 5–2 Florian Nüßle (AUT)
- Matthew Stevens (WAL) 5–2 Sahil Nayyar (CAN)
- Chris Wakelin (ENG) 3–5 Marco Fu (HKG)
- Xu Si (CHN) 5–1 Chris Totten (SCO)
- David Gilbert (ENG) 5–1 Cheung Ka Wai (HKG)
- Lei Peifan (CHN) 5–3 Ng On-yee (HKG)
- Ryan Day (WAL) 5–1 Jonas Luz (BRA)
- Jackson Page (WAL) 5–3 Ross Muir (SCO)
- Robert Milkins (ENG) 1–5 Wang Yuchen (HKG)
- Anthony McGill (SCO) 2–5 Jimmy White (ENG)
- Jak Jones (WAL) 5–0 Oliver Brown (ENG)
- Barry Hawkins (ENG) 5–1 Julien Leclercq (BEL)
- Ben Woollaston (ENG) 5–1 Ken Doherty (IRL)
- Stuart Bingham (ENG) 2–5 Liam Highfield (ENG)
- Jimmy Robertson (ENG) 5–4 Liam Pullen (ENG)
- Kyren Wilson (ENG) 5–0 Connor Benzey (ENG)

Note: n/s=did not show up; w/o=walkover

== Century breaks ==
=== Main stage centuries ===
A total of 61 century breaks were made during the main stage of the tournament in Wuhan.

- 147, 137, 136, 127, 103, 100 – Xiao Guodong
- 147, 106 – Thepchaiya Un-Nooh
- 141 – Chang Bingyu
- 138, 134, 132, 132, 122, 100 – Zhao Xintong
- 137, 129, 125, 100 – Mark Williams
- 137, 124 – Aaron Hill
- 137 – Jak Jones
- 137 – Mark Selby
- 137 – Wang Xinbo
- 135, 120, 109, 106, 103 – Mark Allen
- 133 – Jack Lisowski
- 131, 108 – Stan Moody
- 130, 119, 111, 108, 100 – Judd Trump
- 129 – Jamie Jones
- 128, 118, 116, 113, 108, 104, 103, 102 – Gary Wilson
- 127, 117, 113 – Si Jiahui
- 126, 117 – Ding Junhui
- 120, 119 – Stephen Maguire
- 119 – Liu Hongyu
- 117 – Lei Peifan
- 108 – Tom Ford
- 106 – Allan Taylor
- 106 – Zhou Yuelong
- 102 – Scott Donaldson
- 101 – David Gilbert
- 100 – Shaun Murphy

=== Qualifying stage centuries ===
A total of 29 century breaks were made during the qualifying stage of the tournament in Leicester.

- 138, 115 – Daniel Wells
- 137 – Haydon Pinhey
- 136, 120, 113 – Marco Fu
- 135, 111 – Lyu Haotian
- 134 – Tom Ford
- 132 – Gary Wilson
- 129 – Xu Si
- 127 – Jimmy Robertson
- 124 – Noppon Saengkham
- 122 – Elliot Slessor
- 120, 105 – David Gilbert
- 120 – Mark Selby
- 117 – Louis Heathcote
- 116 – Joe O'Connor
- 114 – Lan Yuhao
- 112 – Si Jiahui
- 112 – Yuan Sijun
- 111 – Jak Jones
- 104 – Fan Zhengyi
- 103 – Mitchell Mann
- 102 – Shaun Murphy
- 102 – Neil Robertson
- 100 – Ishpreet Singh Chadha
- 100 – Stephen Maguire
