= 2026 British Open =

Snooker tournament

2026 Unibet British Open

Tournament information
- Dates: 31 August – 6 September 2026
- Venue: The Centaur
- City: Cheltenham
- Country: England
- Organisation: World Snooker Tour
- Format: Ranking event
- Total prize fund: £502,000
- Winner's share: £100,000
- Highest break: Liam Highfield (ENG) (147)

Final
- Champion: Jak Jones (WAL)
- Runner-up: Mark Selby (ENG)
- Score: 10–6

The 2026 British Open (officially the 2026 Unibet British Open) was a professional snooker tournament that took place from 31 August to 6 September 2026 at the Centaur in Cheltenham, England. Qualifying took place on 23 and 24 July at the Leicester Arena in Leicester, England. The sixth consecutive edition of the tournament since it was revived in 2021, it was the fourth ranking event of the 2026–27 snooker season, following the 2026 Wuhan Open and preceding the 2026 English Open. The winner received £100,000 from a total prize fund of £502,000.

Shaun Murphy was the defending champion, having defeated Anthony McGill 10–7 in the 2025 final, but he was beaten by David Gilbert in the last 64.

Jak Jones won the tournament, beating Mark Selby 10–6 in the final.

== Overview ==
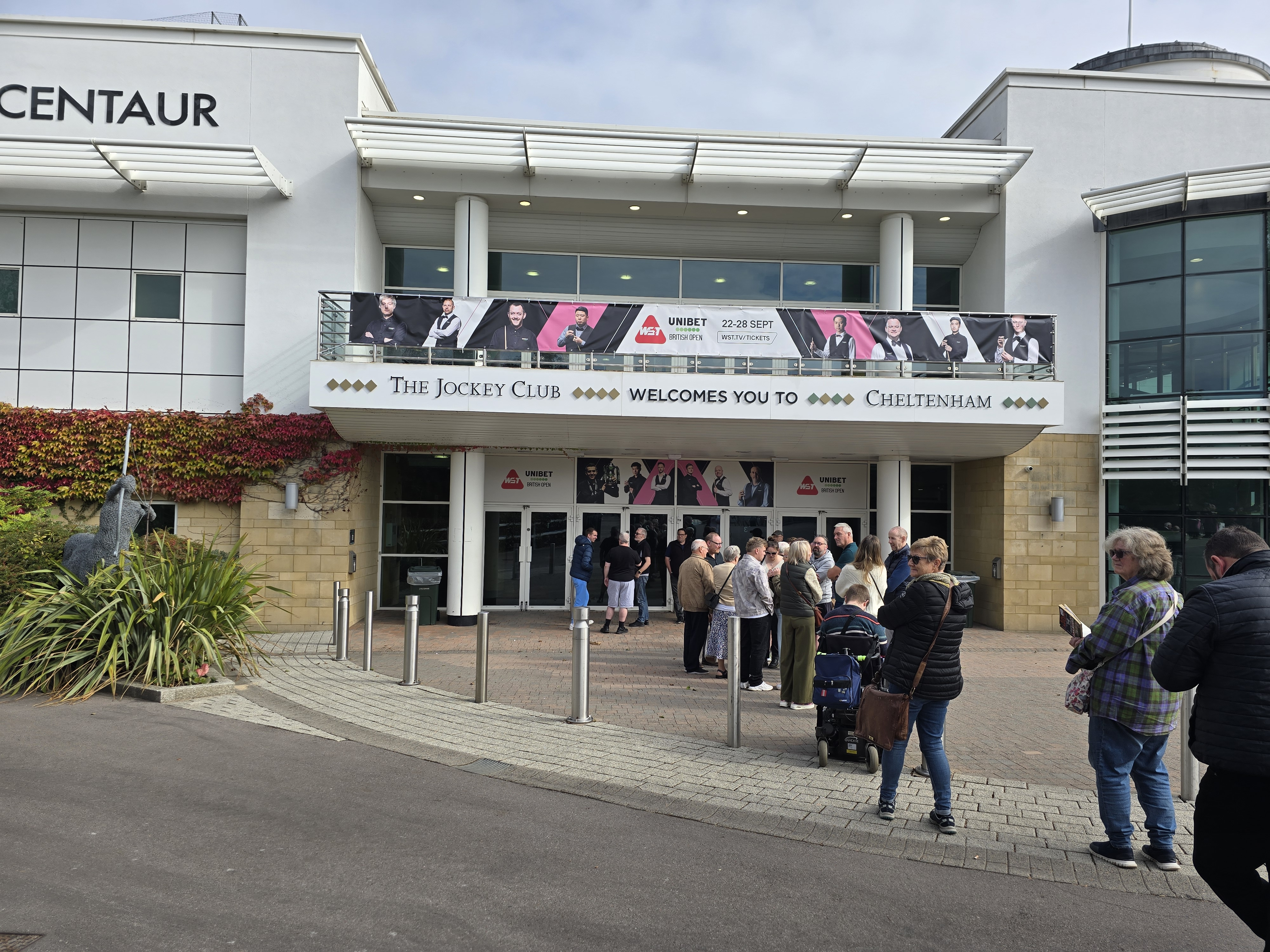
The Centaur at Cheltenham Racecourse (pictured in 2025) hosted the event.

The tournament began in 1980 as the non-ranking British Gold Cup, won by Alex Higgins. Held as the non-ranking Yamaha Organs Trophy in 1981 and the non-ranking Yamaha International Masters from 1982 to 1984, it was renamed the British Open in 1985, when it also gained ranking status. Staged 21 times as a ranking event from 1985 until its discontinuation after the 2004 edition, the tournament was revived as a ranking event in 2021. In 2022, the tournament trophy was named the Clive Everton Trophy to honour the longtime commentator and snooker journalist.

Sponsored by Unibet, the 2026 edition of the tournament was held from 31 August to 6 September at the Centaur in Cheltenham, England. Qualifying took place on 23 and 24 July at the Leicester Arena in Leicester, England. The tournament was the fourth ranking event of the 2026–27 snooker season, following the 2026 Wuhan Open and preceding the 2026 English Open. Shaun Murphy was the defending champion, having defeated Anthony McGill 10–7 in the 2025 final, but he was beaten 4–2 by David Gilbert in the last 64.

Jak Jones won the event, beating Mark Selby 10–6 in the final.

There were 72 century breaks made during the tournament, with 23 during qualifying, and 49 at the main stage. The highest break was a 147 made by Liam Highfield

=== Format ===
There was no seeding system and the draw was randomised for every round. Matches were played as the best of 7 frames up to the quarter-finals, which were the best of 9 frames. The semi-finals were the best of 11 frames, and the final was the best of 19 frames, played over two sessions.

=== Broadcasters ===
The main stage was broadcast in the UK by 5 and 5Action; in mainland China by Huya.com, Migu, CBSA-WPBSA Academy WeChat Channel and CBSA-WPBSA Academy Douyin; in Hong Kong by Now TV; in Malaysia by Astro SuperSport; in Thailand by True Sports; in Taiwan by Sportcast; in New Zealand by Sky Sport. In mainland Europe, and in territories where no other coverage was available, the tournament was streamed via WST Play.

=== Prize fund ===
The winner of the event received £100,000 from a total prize fund of £502,000. The breakdown of prize money for this event is shown below:

- Winner: £100,000
- Runner-up: £45,000
- Semi-final: £20,000
- Quarter-final: £12,000
- Last 16: £9,000
- Last 32: £6,000
- Last 64: £3,000
- Highest break: £5,000
- Total: £502,000

== Summary ==
=== Qualifying ===
Liam Highfield made the first maximum break of his professional career in the first frame of his 4–1 victory over Stephen Maguire. It was the 245th official maximum.

Mark Allen and Ronnie O'Sullivan both withdrew from the tournament, and were replaced by amateur players Patrick Whelan and Mark Joyce respectively.

Judd Trump recovered from 0–2 down to take the next four frames, beating Dylan Emery 4–2. Defending champion Shaun Murphy whitewashed Reanne Evans, and David Gilbert beat Mark Williams, also by a whitewash. Wu Yize defeated Liu Hongyu 4–3, and Kyren Wilson beat Florian Nüßle 4–1.

=== Round two (last 64) ===
Jack Lisowski defeated Mitchell Mann, by 4–3 on the final black, Liam Davies beat Barry Hawkins 4–2, and Wilson defeated Wu 4–1. Mark Selby defeated Lei Peifan 4–3, Gilbert beat defending champion Murphy 4–2, Trump beat Ricky Walden, also by 4–2, John Higgins defeated Noppon Saengkham 4–3, and Zhao Xintong beat Daniel Wells 4–2.

=== Round three (last 32) ===
Iulian Boiko beat Ding Junhui 4–1, Lisowski recovered from 1–3 down to beat Ishpreet Singh Chadha 4–3, Selby defeated Jackson Page 4–3, Jak Jones beat Chang Bingyu 4–1, and Artemijs Žižins beat He Guoqiang, also by 4–1.

=== Round four (last 16) ===
Stan Moody defeated Higgins 4–2, Lisowski beat Lyu Haotian 4–1, and Selby beat Boiko 4–2. Trump whitewashed Gilbert, Jones beat Žižins 4–2, Aaron Hill whitewashed Fan Zhengyi, and Highfield beat Long Zehuang 4–1.

=== Round five (quarter-finals) ===
The quarter-finals were played on 4 September as the best of nine frames.

In the afternoon session Selby whitewashed Lisowski and Highfield beat Moody 5–2. In the evening session Trump beat Zhao 5–1, and Jones beat Hill 5–4.

=== Round six (semi-finals) ===
The semi-finals were played on 5 September as the best of eleven frames.

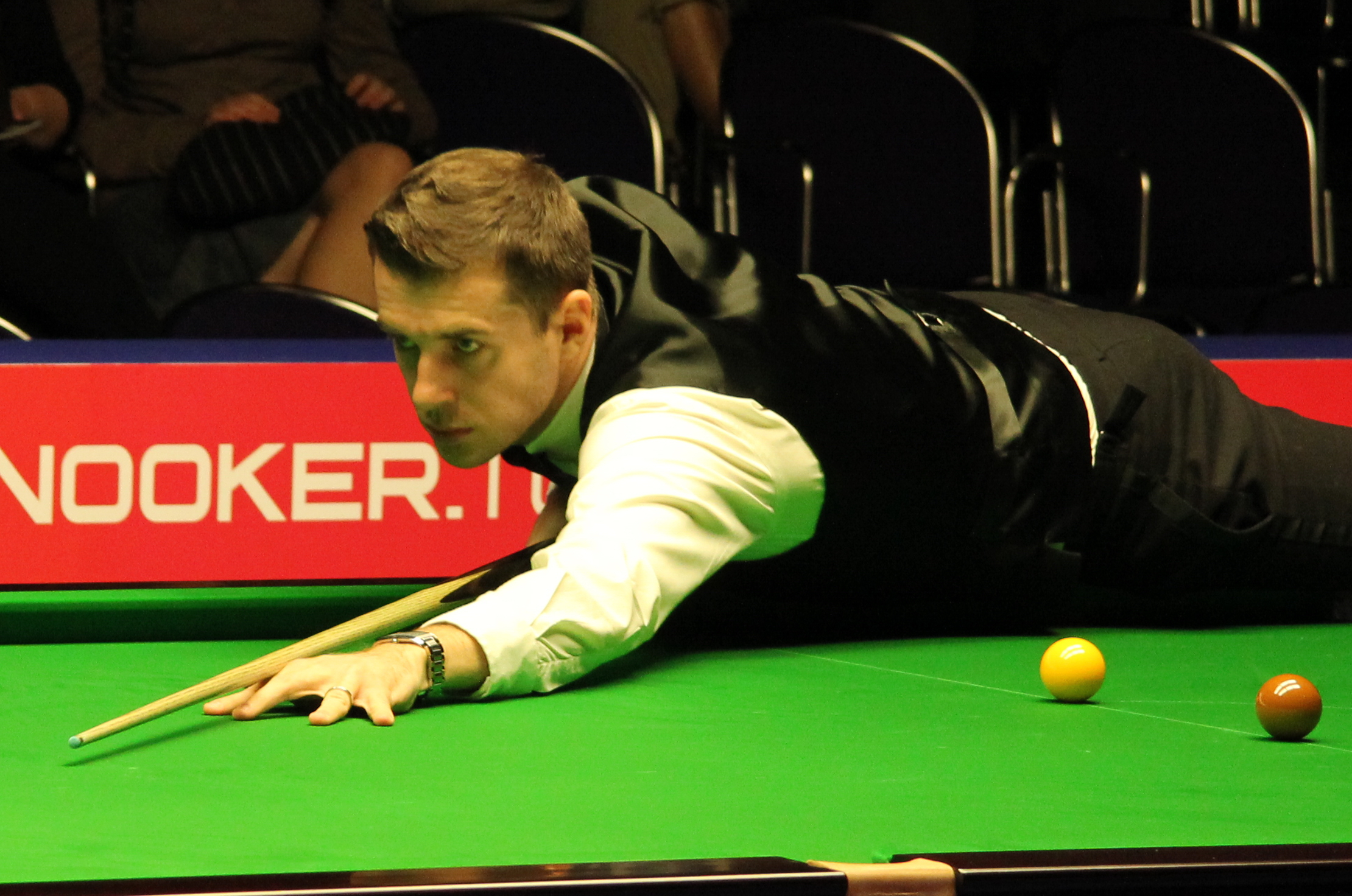
Mark Selby (pictured in 2011) beat Liam Highfield 6–3, in a match that lasted five hours.

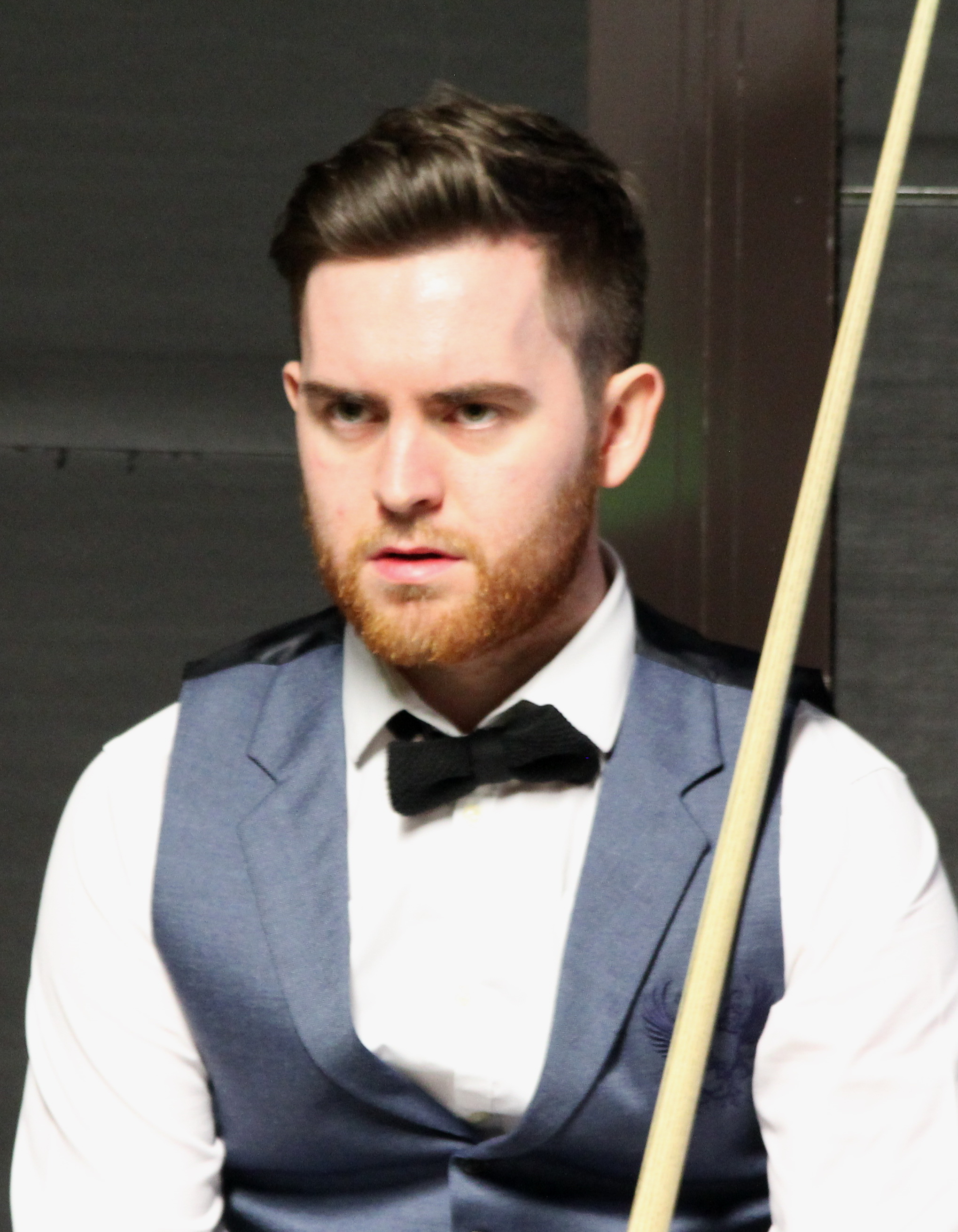
Jak Jones (pictured in 2016) beat Judd Trump 6–3.

In the afternoon session Selby beat Highfield 6–3, in a match that lasted five hours, to reach his 40th ranking final. After the match, Selby said: "It was a tough match, Liam [Highfield] didn't make it easy for me at all, his safety was incredible. I can't remember him playing a poor safety shot all the way through the match. The frames just went scrappy, if no one got in first and won it in one visit, the frames seemed to just follow the same pattern. It was hard to keep your patience and not try and push the boat out because you get frustrated. I was out there fighting. It looked like going 3–1, he probably deserved to be in front. That was probably the difference between me winning and losing the match, it was a key turning point. I won the next frame to go 3–2 up, then the momentum was on my side. Hopefully I get another victory tomorrow, but if not I'll keep on trying and keep playing the way I've played this season. It has been my best ever start to a season, I've played four tournaments and only lost two matches."

In the evening session Jones defeated Trump 6–3. After the match, Jones said: "I knew it would be very tough, Judd [Trump] missed a few balls early on and I punished him, I let him back into it at 3–3 but then made a good break in the next frame. I enjoy taking on the top players because I know I have to play well. I practised hard over the summer, it has been my best start to a season and I feel good about my life on and off the table. Mark Selby is one of the all‑time greats, he's big favourite but hopefully I can give him a decent game."

=== Final ===
The final was played on 6 September as the best of 19 frames, played over two sessions.

Selby faced Jones. At the end of the afternoon session the score was tied at 4–4. Jones went on to win the match, and the tournament 10–6. After the match, Jones said: "The Championship League felt good, but obviously this is a completely different level, it's a major tournament, I'm over the moon. I felt I dragged Mark [Selby] down a little bit throughout the day. I just kind of battled away and made a few 50 and 60 breaks. But to beat someone like Mark, who's an all‑time great and has won everything in the game, is incredible. It's definitely the best day of my career. Winning a ranking event is better than coming runner‑up in a World Championship. To finally win a big tournament like this – I thought it might not happen. It's an unbelievable start to the season for me, so I'm buzzing. It has been tough for 15 years, I have been battling away but haven't really achieved that much, so to start winning titles feels amazing." Selby said: "Jak [Jones] played great from start to finish, he scored well and his safety was good. He was the best player on [sic] on the day. I felt it was only a matter of time before he started winning titles."

== Main draw ==
Numbers in parentheses after the players' names denote the players' seeding, and an (a) indicates amateur players not on the World Snooker Tour. Winners of matches are shown in bold.

=== Last 64 ===
- **Iulian Boiko** (UKR) (71) **4**–2 Xu Yichen (CHN) (80)
- Gong Chenzhi (CHN) (113) 2–**4** **He Guoqiang** (CHN) (47)
- **Mark Joyce** (ENG) (a) **4**–0 Jordan Brown (NIR) (64)
- **Jackson Page** (WAL) (35) **4**–1 Jimmy Robertson (ENG) (33)
- **Jak Jones** (WAL) (32) **4**–0 Anthony McGill (SCO) (38)
- Chatchapong Nasa (THA) (91) 1–**4** **Chang Bingyu** (CHN) (48)
- Liu Yang (CHN) (126) 2–**4** **Duane Jones** (WAL) (a)
- Xiao Guodong (CHN) (11) 2–**4** **Lyu Haotian** (CHN) (61)
- Joshua Thomond (ENG) (a) 2–**4** **Artemijs Žižins** (LVA) (118)
- Mahmoud El Hareedy (EGY) (97) 2–**4** **Liam Highfield** (ENG) (68)
- Chris Wakelin (ENG) (13) 3–**4** **Zhang Anda** (CHN) (20)
- Wu Yize (CHN) (2) 1–**4** **Kyren Wilson** (ENG) (8)
- **Elliot Slessor** (ENG) (19) **4**–1 Jamie Clarke (WAL) (101)
- Steven Hallworth (ENG) (73) 2–**4** **Ishpreet Singh Chadha** (IND) (59)
- Mitchell Mann (ENG) (100) 3–**4** **Jack Lisowski** (ENG) (17)
- Sean O'Sullivan (ENG) (104) 0–**4** **Ding Junhui** (CHN) (15)
- Phil O'Kane (ENG) (120) 0–**4** **Michael Holt** (ENG) (51)
- Ali Carter (ENG) (22) 3–**4** **Thanawat Tirapongpaiboon** (THA) (119)
- **Liam Davies** (WAL) (111) **4**–2 Barry Hawkins (ENG) (10)
- **Pang Junxu** (CHN) (25) **4**–2 Liam Graham (SCO) (87)
- Ashley Carty (ENG) (106) 2–**4** **Long Zehuang** (CHN) (50)
- Matthew Stevens (WAL) (49) 3–**4** **Fan Zhengyi** (CHN) (57)
- **Stan Moody** (ENG) (40) **4**–1 Yao Pengcheng (CHN) (79)
- Lei Peifan (CHN) (26) 3–**4** **Mark Selby** (ENG) (9)
- Bai Yulu (CHN) (112) 3–**4** **Ross Muir** (SCO) (84)
- **Wang Xinbo** (CHN) (117) **4**–3 Jamie Jones (WAL) (63)
- **Judd Trump** (ENG) (3) **4**–2 Ricky Walden (ENG) (54)
- **David Gilbert** (ENG) (31) **4**–2 Shaun Murphy (ENG) (1)
- **David Grace** (ENG) (74) **4**–1 Zak Surety (ENG) (42)
- **Aaron Hill** (IRL) (41) **4**–2 Ben Mertens (BEL) (62)
- Noppon Saengkham (THA) (46) 3–**4** **John Higgins** (SCO) (6)
- **Zhao Xintong** (CHN) (5) **4**–2 Daniel Wells (WAL) (45)

=== Last 32 ===
- **Mark Selby** (ENG) (9) **4**–3 Jackson Page (WAL) (35)
- Ishpreet Singh Chadha (IND) (59) 3–**4** **Jack Lisowski** (ENG) (17)
- **Iulian Boiko** (UKR) (71) **4**–1 Ding Junhui (CHN) (15)
- **Lyu Haotian** (CHN) (61) **4**–3 Duane Jones (WAL) (a)
- He Guoqiang (CHN) (47) 1–**4** **Artemijs Žižins** (LVA) (118)
- Pang Junxu (CHN) (25) 0–**4** **Mark Joyce** (ENG) (a)
- Kyren Wilson (ENG) (8) 1–**4** **Liam Highfield** (ENG) (68)
- **Jak Jones** (WAL) (32) **4**–1 Chang Bingyu (CHN) (48)
- **Stan Moody** (ENG) (40) **4**–3 Zhang Anda (CHN) (20)
- **Aaron Hill** (IRL) (41) **4**–2 Wang Xinbo (CHN) (117)
- **Judd Trump** (ENG) (3) **4**–0 Elliot Slessor (ENG) (19)
- **John Higgins** (SCO) (6) **4**–3 Thanawat Tirapongpaiboon (THA) (119)
- David Grace (ENG) (74) 0–**4** **Long Zehuang** (CHN) (50)
- **David Gilbert** (ENG) (31) **4**–3 Liam Davies (WAL) (111)
- Ross Muir (SCO) (84) 2–**4** **Fan Zhengyi** (CHN) (57)
- **Zhao Xintong** (CHN) (5) **4**–0 Michael Holt (ENG) (51)

=== Last 16 ===
- Lyu Haotian (CHN) (61) 1–**4** **Jack Lisowski** (ENG) (17)
- John Higgins (SCO) (6) 2–**4** **Stan Moody** (ENG) (40)
- **Jak Jones** (WAL) (32) **4**–2 Artemijs Žižins (LVA) (118)
- Iulian Boiko (UKR) (71) 2–**4** **Mark Selby** (ENG) (9)
- Mark Joyce (ENG) (a) 2–**4** **Zhao Xintong** (CHN) (5)
- David Gilbert (ENG) (31) 0–**4** **Judd Trump** (ENG) (3)
- Fan Zhengyi (CHN) (57) 0–**4** **Aaron Hill** (IRL) (41)
- Long Zehuang (CHN) (50) 1–**4** **Liam Highfield** (ENG) (68)

=== Quarter-finals ===
- **Liam Highfield** (ENG) (68) **5**–2 Stan Moody (ENG) (40)
- **Mark Selby** (ENG) (9) **5**–0 Jack Lisowski (ENG) (17)
- Aaron Hill (IRL) (41) 4–**5** **Jak Jones** (WAL) (32)
- **Judd Trump** (ENG) (3) **5**–1 Zhao Xintong (CHN) (5)

=== Semi-finals ===
- Liam Highfield (ENG) (68) 3–**6** **Mark Selby** (ENG) (9)
- **Jak Jones** (WAL) (32) **6**–3 Judd Trump (ENG) (3)

=== Final: frame scores ===
Final: Best of 19 frames. Referee: Terry Camilleri; The Centaur, Cheltenham, England, 6 September 2026
Mark Selby (9); England	6–**10**	**Jak Jones** (32); Wales
Afternoon: 45–**72**, **143**–0 (139), 0–**81**, **71**–5, 0–**92**, **87**–25, 60–**69**, **71**–23; Evening: 0–**74**, **136**–0 (100), 24–**70**, 66–**72**, **81**–47, 13–**71**, 25–**71**, 61–**71**
(frame 2) **139**	Highest break	65 (frame 11)
**2**	Century breaks	0

== Qualifying draw ==
Numbers in parentheses after the players' names denote the players' seeding, and an (a) indicates amateur players not on the World Snooker Tour. Winners of matches are shown in bold.

=== Cheltenham ===
The sixteen qualifying matches featuring the highest ranked players were played at the Centaur in Cheltenham on 31 August and 1 September.

- **Shaun Murphy** (ENG) (1) **4**–0 Reanne Evans (ENG) (82)
- Mark Williams (WAL) (7) 0–**4** **David Gilbert** (ENG) (31)
- **Ding Junhui** (CHN) (15) **4**–1 Anton Kazakov (UKR) (115)
- **Barry Hawkins** (ENG) (10) **4**–0 Deng Haohui (CHN) (124)
- **Wu Yize** (CHN) (2) **4**–3 Liu Hongyu (CHN) (58)
- **Mark Joyce** (ENG) (a) **4**–1 Mateusz Baranowski (POL) (85) (Note: Mark Joyce replaced Ronnie O'Sullivan who withdrew.)
- Florian Nüßle (AUT) (93) 1–**4** **Kyren Wilson** (ENG) (8)
- **Xiao Guodong** (CHN) (11) **4**–2 Jiang Jun (CHN) (65)
- **Wang Xinbo** (CHN) (117) **4**–1 Patrick Whelan (ENG) (a) (Note: Patrick Whelan replaced Mark Allen who withdrew.)
- **Judd Trump** (ENG) (3) **4**–2 Dylan Emery (WAL) (72)
- **Chris Wakelin** (ENG) (13) **4**–3 Luca Brecel (BEL) (44)
- **Mark Selby** (ENG) (9) **4**–3 David Lilley (ENG) (60)
- **Pang Junxu** (CHN) (25) **4**–1 Neil Robertson (AUS) (4)
- **John Higgins** (SCO) (6) **4**–1 Hossein Vafaei (IRN) (28)
- **Ashley Carty** (ENG) (106) **4**–3 Si Jiahui (CHN) (16)
- Oliver Brown (ENG) (92) 1–**4** **Zhao Xintong** (CHN) (5) (Note: The match between Oliver Brown and Zhao Xintong was delayed until 1 September because Zhao played in the final of the Wuhan Open on 29 August.)

=== Leicester ===
The remaining qualifying matches were played at the Leicester Arena between 23 and 24 July.

- Martin O'Donnell (ENG) (52) 3–**4** **Liam Graham** (SCO) (87)
- Joe O'Connor (ENG) (27) 3–**4** **Anthony McGill** (SCO) (38)
- **Matthew Stevens** (WAL) (49) **4**–2 Antoni Kowalski (POL) (109)
- Michael Larkov (UKR) (125) 0–**4** **Artemijs Žižins** (LVA) (118)
- Fergal Quinn (NIR) (90) 1–**4** **Jackson Page** (WAL) (35)
- Luo Zetao (CHN) (122) 3–**4** **Iulian Boiko** (UKR) (71)
- Alfie Burden (ENG) (98) 2–**4** **Zhang Anda** (CHN) (20)
- **Joshua Thomond** (ENG) (a) **4**–3 Sam Craigie (ENG) (70)
- Gary Wilson (ENG) (24) 1–**4** **Ricky Walden** (ENG) (54)
- Ng On-yee (HKG) (95) 2–**4** **Yao Pengcheng** (CHN) (79)
- Liu Wenwei (CHN) (83) 1–**4** **Jordan Brown** (NIR) (64)
- **Mahmoud El Hareedy** (EGY) (97) **4**–1 Lan Yuhao (CHN) (78)
- Marco Fu (HKG) (69) 2–**4** **Steven Hallworth** (ENG) (73)
- Leone Crowley (IRL) (86) 1–**4** **Long Zehuang** (CHN) (50)
- **Thanawat Tirapongpaiboon** (THA) (119) **4**–0 Gao Yang (CHN) (75)
- Allan Taylor (ENG) (a) (Note: Allan Taylor replaced Ian Burns who withdrew.) 3–**4** **Ishpreet Singh Chadha** (IND) (59)
- Scott Donaldson (SCO) (55) 1–**4** **Jack Lisowski** (ENG) (17)
- Ryan Day (WAL) (37) 3–**4** **Chatchapong Nasa** (THA) (91)
- Liam Pullen (ENG) (66) 2–**4** **Daniel Wells** (WAL) (45)
- **Fan Zhengyi** (CHN) (57) **4**–1 Ben Woollaston (ENG) (39)
- Huang Jiahao (CHN) (107) 1–**4** **Zak Surety** (ENG) (42)
- **Jamie Jones** (WAL) (63) **4**–1 Oliver Sykes (ENG) (116)
- Oliver Lines (ENG) (53) 3–**4** **Xu Yichen** (CHN) (80)
- **Jimmy Robertson** (ENG) (33) **4**–3 Zhou Yuelong (CHN) (23)
- Connor Benzey (ENG) (88) 2–**4** **Phil O'Kane** (ENG) (120)
- **Ben Mertens** (BEL) (62) **4**–1 Zhao Hanyang (CHN) (81)
- Michał Szubarczyk (POL) (77) 1–**4** **David Grace** (ENG) (74)
- **Gong Chenzhi** (CHN) (113) **4**–3 Xu Si (CHN) (34)
- Matthew Selt (ENG) (43) 3–**4** **Jak Jones** (WAL) (32)
- Alexander Ursenbacher (SUI) (89) 0–**4** **Duane Jones** (WAL) (a)
- Panchaya Channoi (THA) (123) 2–**4** **Aaron Hill** (IRL) (41)
- Stuart Bingham (ENG) (21) 0–**4** **Chang Bingyu** (CHN) (48)
- Paul Norris (ENG) (121) 0–**4** **Stan Moody** (ENG) (40)
- **Michael Holt** (ENG) (51) **4**–3 Cheung Ka Wai (HKG) (110)
- Yuan Sijun (CHN) (30) 2–**4** **Lyu Haotian** (CHN) (61)
- **Elliot Slessor** (ENG) (19) **4**–1 Julien Leclercq (BEL) (114)
- Thepchaiya Un-Nooh (THA) (18) 3–**4** **Jamie Clarke** (WAL) (101)
- Tom Ford (ENG) (36) (Note: Tom Ford withdrew giving Ross Muir a walkover.) w/d–**w/o** **Ross Muir** (SCO) (84)
- **Noppon Saengkham** (THA) (46) **4**–2 Ashley Hugill (ENG) (108)
- Sahil Nayyar (CAN) (96) 1–**4** **Bai Yulu** (CHN) (112)
- **Mitchell Mann** (ENG) (100) **4**–3 Louis Heathcote (ENG) (67)
- **Liu Yang** (CHN) (126) **4**–1 Andrew Higginson (ENG) (99)
- Stephen Maguire (SCO) (29) 1–**4** **Liam Highfield** (ENG) (68)
- **Liam Davies** (WAL) (111) **4**–2 Craig Steadman (ENG) (103)
- Robbie Williams (ENG) (56) 0–**4** **He Guoqiang** (CHN) (47)
- Jimmy White (ENG) (94) 1–**4** **Sean O'Sullivan** (ENG) (104)
- **Lei Peifan** (CHN) (26) **4**–1 Hammad Miah (ENG) (105)
- **Ali Carter** (ENG) (22) **4**–0 Stuart Carrington (ENG) (102)

Note: w/d=withdrawn; w/o=walkover

== Century breaks ==
=== Main stage centuries ===
A total of 49 century breaks have been made during the main stage of the tournament in Cheltenham.

- 139, 132, 126, 113, 100 – Mark Selby
- 139, 112, 107, 100, 100 – Zhao Xintong
- 134, 100 – Ali Carter
- 133, 117 – Stan Moody
- 132 – Ross Muir
- 131, 130, 118, 111 – Jak Jones
- 129 – Neil Robertson
- 127 – Ding Junhui
- 125, 107 – Dylan Emery
- 120, 112, 104 – Jack Lisowski
- 120, 104, 102 – Liam Highfield
- 118, 111, 105, 104, 101 – Judd Trump
- 117, 106 – David Gilbert
- 116 – Fan Zhengyi
- 113, 100 – Mark Joyce
- 113 – Lyu Haotian
- 112, 108 – Chris Wakelin
- 110 – Aaron Hill
- 109 – Thanawat Tirapongpaiboon
- 106 – Pang Junxu
- 106 – Yao Pengcheng
- 105 – Ishpreet Singh Chadha
- 103 – Shaun Murphy
- 101 – Chang Bingyu

=== Qualifying stage centuries ===
A total of 23 century breaks were made during the qualifying stage of the tournament in Leicester.

- 147 – Liam Highfield
- 141 – Lyu Haotian
- 134 – Ricky Walden
- 133 – Long Zehuang
- 129 – Elliot Slessor
- 125, 101 – Noppon Saengkham
- 124, 108 – Louis Heathcote
- 122 – Antoni Kowalski
- 121 – Zhou Yuelong
- 120 – Duane Jones
- 115 – Anthony McGill
- 115 – Liam Pullen
- 113 – Jimmy Robertson
- 108 – Daniel Wells
- 107 – Alfie Burden
- 106 – Liu Yang
- 105 – Jamie Jones
- 104 – Ishpreet Singh Chadha
- 102 – Chang Bingyu
- 102 – Jak Jones
- 101 – Ashley Hugill
