= Artemijs Žižins =

Latvian snooker player

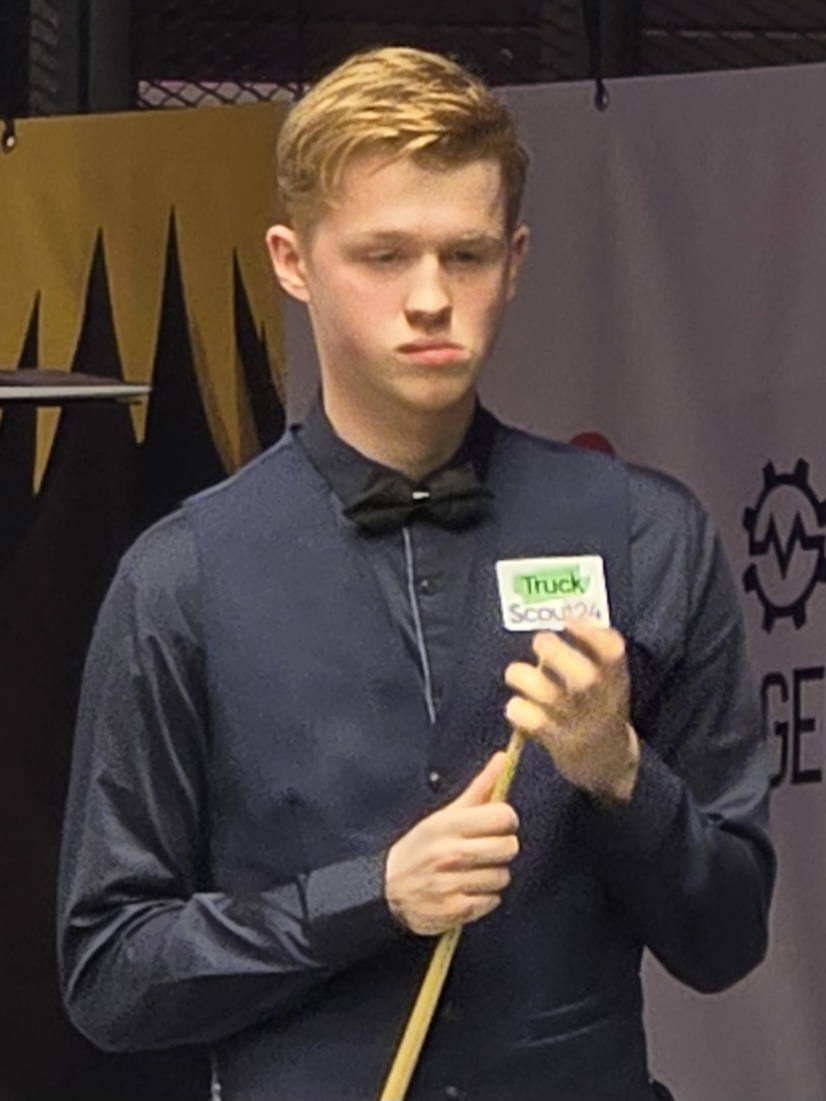
- Žižins in 2025

Personal information
- Born: 2 June 2006 (age 20)

Sport
- Country: Latvia
- Sport: Snooker
- Professional: 2024–present
- Highest ranking: 68 (March 2026)
- Current ranking: 88 (as of 7 November 2026)
- Best ranking finish: Last 16 (x2)

Artemijs Žižins (born 2 June 2006) is a Latvian professional snooker player. He earned a two-year card on the World Snooker Tour starting with the 2024–25 snooker season. He is the first ever professional player from Latvia.

== Career ==
In 2022 he became European U16 champion defeating Liam Davies in the semi-final and Moldovan Vladislav Gradinari in the final.

In June 2023, shortly after turning 17 years old, Žižins defeated five-time champion Rodion Judin 5–2 to claim his first Latvian National Snooker Championship.

In March 2024, he reached the semi-final of the EBSA European Under-18 Snooker Championship where he was defeated by eventual champion Bulcsú Révész of Hungary.

=== 2024/25 ===
In May 2024, he entered European Q School and recorded victories over former professional Iulian Boiko of Ukraine, and a 4–2 win over Mark Joyce. In the final round he beat Kayden Brierley to win a two-year place on the World Snooker Tour starting from the 2024-25 snooker season. In June 2024, he made his professional debut at the 2024 Championship League in Leicester, losing 3–0 to former world champion John Higgins.

In July 2024, he recorded a 5–3 win over Robbie Williams in qualifying for the 2024 Xi'an Grand Prix. He reached the third round of the 2024 Saudi Arabia Snooker Masters, in which he was defeated by Thepchaiya Un-Nooh. In the previous round, he scored a 137 break in a deciding frame victory against Xu Si. At the 2024 English Open in Brentwood in September 2024, he reached the round of 64 with wins over Duane Jones and Robbie Williams. He also qualified for the 2025 German Masters, achieving a 5–4 win over Englishman Matthew Selt.

=== 2025/26 ===
In June 2025, he was drawn to make his season debut in the first round of qualifying for the 2025 Wuhan Open where he defeated He Guoqiang of China 5–1. In the qualifying round for the 2025 British Open, he was building a 147 break when he missed the 14th black, in a 4–2 defeat to Bai Yulu. He was drawn in the round-robin stage of the 2025 Championship League against Si Jiahui, Farakh Ajaib and Kayden Brierley, winning all three matches with the loss of only one frame, to top the group.

In qualifying for the 2025 UK Championship, he defeated Cheung Ka Wai 6–3 with a top break of 133, before winning 6–4 against Ali Carter but then narrowly missing a place in the last-32, with a 6–5 defeat to David Lilley. He reached the last-64 of the 2025 Scottish Open with a win over Jimmy Robertson before losing to former world champion Stuart Bingham.

In March 2026, he reached the last-16 of a ranking event for the first time at the 2026 World Open, which saw his ranking rise to a career-high world no. 68.

=== 2026/27 ===
At the start of the 2026–27 season, Zizins beat David Lilley to set up a match against reigning World Champion Wu Yize at the 2026 Wuhan Open, which he won 5–4 on 24 August for the biggest win of his career. In September, he reached the last-16 of the 2026 British Open. In November, he scored three centuries in a win against David Grace to reach the third round of qualifying at the 2026 UK Championship.

== Performance and rankings timeline ==
Tournament	2024/ 25	2025/ 26	2026/ 27
Ranking (Note: It shows the ranking at the beginning of the season)	(Note: New players on the Main Tour do not have a ranking)	78	(Note: Players qualified One Year Ranking List started the season without ranking points)
Ranking tournaments
Championship League	RR	2R	RR
China Open	Not Held		LQ
Wuhan Open	LQ	1R	1R
British Open	LQ	LQ	3R
English Open	1R	LQ	1R
Shenzhen Open (Note: The event was called the Xi'an Grand Prix (2024/2025–2025/2026))	1R	LQ	LQ
Northern Ireland Open	LQ	LQ	LQ
International Championship	LQ	LQ	LQ
UK Championship	LQ	LQ	
Shoot Out	2R	WD	
Scottish Open	LQ	1R	LQ
German Masters	1R	LQ	LQ
Welsh Open	LQ	1R	
World Grand Prix	DNQ	DNQ	
Players Championship	DNQ	DNQ	
World Open	LQ	3R	
Tour Championship	DNQ	DNQ	
World Championship	LQ	LQ	
Former ranking tournaments
Saudi Arabia Masters	3R	3R	NH

Performance Table Legend
LQ	lost in the qualifying draw	#R	lost in the early rounds of the tournament (WR = Wildcard round, RR = Round robin)	QF	lost in the quarter-finals
SF	lost in the semi-finals	F	lost in the final	W	won the tournament
DNQ	did not qualify for the tournament	A	did not participate in the tournament	WD	withdrew from the tournament

NH / Not Held	means an event was not held.
NR / Non-Ranking Event	means an event is/was no longer a ranking event.
R / Ranking Event	means an event is/was a ranking event.
MR / Minor-Ranking Event	means an event is/was a minor-ranking event.

== Career finals ==
=== Amateur finals: 5 (4 titles) ===
Outcome	No.	Year	Championship	Opponent in the final	Score
Winner	1.	2020	Baltic Snooker League - Event 2	(Lithuania) Vilius Schulte-Ebbert	4–1
Runner-up	1.	2022	Latvia Amateur Championship	(Latvia) Andrej Pripjoks	0–5
Winner	2.	2022	European Under-16 Championship	(Moldova) Vladislav Gradinari	2–1
Winner	3.	2023	Latvia Amateur Championship	(Latvia) Rodion Judin	5–2
Winner	4.	2024	Latvia Amateur Championship (2)	(Latvia) Andrej Pripjoks	5–3
