= Jonas Luz =

Brazilian snooker player

Personal information
- Born: November 29, 1985 (age 40)

Sport
- Country: Brazil
- Sport: Snooker
- Professional: 2024–2026
- Highest ranking: 97 (July 2025)
- Best ranking finish: Last 112 (2024 Saudi Arabia Masters)

Jonas Luz (born 29 November 1985) is a Brazilian former professional snooker player. He won the Pan America title to earn a place on the World Snooker Tour from the 2024-25 snooker season.

== Career ==
From Esteio, in the Rio Grande do Sul, he started playing snooker at three years-old. He is based in Canoas where he trains at the Match Clube de Sinuca.

Luz won the Brazilian Snooker Championships in 2021. He won the Six Reds Snooker at Clube União, in Caçapava in 2022. He was runner-up at the 2023 Brazilian Championship.

Luz won the 2023 Pan American Snooker Championship held in Rio de Janeiro. He overcame a defeat to Itaro Santos in the group stage to beat Zico, Rafinha, and Canadian Charlie Brown en-route to the final. In the final he defeated compatriot Fabinho 5-4. With the win he earned qualification to snooker’s professional circuit for the first time.

=== Professional career ===
He secured his first win as a professional in August 2024, defeating Mostafa Dorgham at the 2024 Saudi Arabia Snooker Masters.

In June 2025, he was drawn to make his season debut in the first round of qualifying for the 2025 Wuhan Open against Ryan Day of Wales, losing 5-1. He was drawn in the round-robin stage of the 2025 Championship League against Jak Jones, Ben Mertens and Welsh amateur Alfie Davies. In April 2026, he lost 10-2 against Peter Lines in the first round of qualifying for the 2026 World Snooker Championship.

== Performance and rankings timeline ==
Tournament	2024/ 25	2025/ 26
Ranking (Note: It shows the ranking at the beginning of the season)	(Note: New players on the Main Tour don't have a ranking)	92
Ranking tournaments
Championship League	A	RR
Saudi Arabia Masters	2R	2R
Wuhan Open	A	LQ
English Open	WD	LQ
British Open	A	LQ
Xi'an Grand Prix	A	LQ
Northern Ireland Open	A	LQ
International Championship	LQ	LQ
UK Championship	LQ	LQ
Shoot Out	1R	1R
Scottish Open	LQ	LQ
German Masters	LQ	LQ
World Grand Prix	DNQ	DNQ
Players Championship	DNQ	DNQ
Welsh Open	LQ	LQ
World Open	LQ	LQ
Tour Championship	DNQ	DNQ
World Championship	LQ	LQ

Performance Table Legend
LQ	lost in the qualifying draw	#R	lost in the early rounds of the tournament (WR = Wildcard round, RR = Round robin)	QF	lost in the quarter-finals
SF	lost in the semi-finals	F	lost in the final	W	won the tournament
DNQ	did not qualify for the tournament	A	did not participate in the tournament	WD	withdrew from the tournament

NH / Not Held	means an event was not held.
NR / Non-Ranking Event	means an event is/was no longer a ranking event.
R / Ranking Event	means an event is/was a ranking event.
MR / Minor-Ranking Event	means an event is/was a minor-ranking event.

== Career finals ==
=== Amateur finals: 1 (1 title) ===
Outcome	No.	Year	Championship	Opponent in the final	Score
Winner	1.	2023	Pan American Snooker Championship	(Brazil) Fabio Anderson Luersen	5–4
