= Leone Crowley =

Irish snooker player

Personal information
- Nickname: Lightning
- Born: 2 June 2006 (age 20) Dublin Hill, Cork, Ireland

Sport
- Country: Ireland
- Sport: Snooker
- Professional: 2025–present
- Highest ranking: 86 (July 2026)
- Current ranking: 89 (as of 7 November 2026)
- Best ranking finish: Last 112 (2025 Saudi Arabia Snooker Masters)

Leone Crowley (born 2 June 2006) is an Irish professional snooker player. In January 2025 he won the WSF World Junior Championship, and with it earned a two-year card on the World Snooker Tour starting with the 2025–26 snooker season.

== Career ==
A successful junior snooker player, he won Irish national titles in the U12, U14, U16, U18, and U21 age-groups. In 2022, he was a finalist at the EBSA European Under-18 Snooker Championship, in Albania. He had his first televised match at the 2023 Snooker Shoot Out in Swansea, where he was defeated by Welsh professional Jackson Page.

He won the U21 UK Open Championship in 2024. He reached the final of the WSF Junior Snooker Championship in January 2025 in Saïdia, Morocco, with a semi-final win over Scotland's Amaan Iqbal, having had dominant wins as he progressed through the tournament, only lost six frames in total up to that point in the championship. In the final on 23 January 2025, he whitewashed Kaylan Patel of England 5-0 to secure a two-year professional card on the World Snooker Tour from the 2025-26 snooker season. He also became the first Irishman to win the event. He was awarded a place into the qualifying rounds for the 2025 World Snooker Championship. In the first round of qualifying, held in Sheffield, in April 2025, he was defeated 3-10 by Thailand professional Manasawin Phetmalaikul.

=== 2025-26 season ===
In June 2025, he was drawn to make his professional debut in the first round of qualifying for the 2025 Wuhan Open against former world champion Neil Robertson, and suffered a 5-0 defeat. He recorded his first win as a professional later that month in qualifying for the 2025 British Open, with a 4-0 win against Hatem Yassen. He was drawn in the round-robin stage of the 2025 Championship League against Daniel Wells, Ng On Yee and He Guoqiang, earning a 2-2 draw against Wells. In April 2026, Crowley won his first round match 10-5 in the qualifying rounds for the 2026 World Snooker Championship against Huang Jiahao before defeating Duane Jones of Wales by the same margin to set up a third round match against experienced professional Dave Gilbert, losing 10-3.

=== 2026/27 season ===
In September 2026, Crowley led former world champion Kyren Wilson 5-2 before being ultimately defeated 6-5 in the qualifying round for the 2026 International Championship. Later that season, he recorded a win over Jimmy Robertson in qualifying for the 2027 German Masters. He also reached the second round of qualifying at the 2026 UK Championship.

== Personal life ==
He is from Dublin Hill, Cork, in the Republic of Ireland. He practised for a time with former professional Anthony O'Connor at Shooters snooker club in Cork. He regularly practises at Mark Allen's snooker camp in Belfast.

== Performance and rankings timeline ==
| Tournament | 2023/ 24 | 2024/ 25 | 2025/ 26 | 2026/ 27 |
|---|---|---|---|---|
| Ranking (Note: It shows the ranking at the beginning of the season) | (Note: He was an amateur) | | (Note: New players on the Main Tour don't have a ranking) | 86 |
Ranking tournaments
| Championship League | A | A | RR | RR |
| China Open | Not Held | | | LQ |
| Wuhan Open | A | A | LQ | LQ |
| British Open | A | A | 1R | LQ |
| English Open | A | A | LQ | LQ |
| Shenzhen Open (Note: The event was called the Xi'an Grand Prix (2024/2025–2025/2026)) | NH | A | LQ | LQ |
| Northern Ireland Open | A | A | LQ | LQ |
| International Championship | A | A | LQ | LQ |
| UK Championship | A | A | LQ | LQ |
| Shoot Out | 1R | A | 1R | |
| Scottish Open | A | A | LQ | LQ |
| German Masters | A | A | LQ | LQ |
| Welsh Open | A | A | LQ | |
| World Grand Prix | DNQ | DNQ | DNQ | |
| Players Championship | DNQ | DNQ | DNQ | |
| World Open | A | A | LQ | |
| Tour Championship | DNQ | DNQ | DNQ | |
| World Championship | A | LQ | LQ | |
Former ranking tournaments
| Saudi Arabia Masters | NH | A | 2R | NH |

Performance Table Legend
| LQ | lost in the qualifying draw | #R | lost in the early rounds of the tournament (WR = Wildcard round, RR = Round robin) | QF | lost in the quarter-finals |
| SF | lost in the semi-finals | F | lost in the final | W | won the tournament |
| DNQ | did not qualify for the tournament | A | did not participate in the tournament | WD | withdrew from the tournament |

| NH / Not Held | means an event was not held. |
| NR / Non-Ranking Event | means an event is/was no longer a ranking event. |
| R / Ranking Event | means an event is/was a ranking event. |
| MR / Minor-Ranking Event | means an event is/was a minor-ranking event. |

== Career finals ==
=== Amateur finals: 11 (8 titles) ===
| Outcome | No. | Year | Championship | Opponent in the final | Score |
|---|---|---|---|---|---|
| Winner | 1. | 2017 | Irish Under-12 Championship | (Republic of Ireland) Adam Quinn | 3–0 |
| Runner-up | 1. | 2019 | Irish Under-18 Championship | (Republic of Ireland) Aaron Hill | 0–4 |
| Winner | 2. | 2021 | Irish Under-18 Championship | (Republic of Ireland) Alex Currid | 3–2 |
| Winner | 3. | 2021 | Irish Under-16 Championship | (Republic of Ireland) Aaron Smith | 3–2 |
| Runner-up | 2. | 2021 | Irish Under-21 Championship | (Republic of Ireland) Ross Bulman | 1–3 |
| Winner | 4. | 2022 | Irish Under-18 Championship | (Republic of Ireland) Alex Currid | 3–1 |
| Winner | 5. | 2022 | Irish Under-21 Championship | (Republic of Ireland) Aaron Goldrick | 3–2 |
| Winner | 6. | 2022 | Irish Under-16 Championship | (Republic of Ireland) David Farrelly | 3–0 |
| Runner-up | 3. | 2022 | European Under-18 Championships | (Wales) Liam Davies | 1–4 |
| Winner | 7. | 2023 | Irish Under-21 Championship | (Republic of Ireland) Sean Walsh | 3–2 |
| Winner | 8. | 2025 | WSF Junior Championship | (England) Kaylan Patel | 5–0 |
