= EBSA European Under-16 Snooker Championship =

The EBSA European Under-16 Snooker Championships is an amateur junior snooker tournament. The event series is sanctioned by the European Billiards and Snooker Association and started from 2022.

== Winners ==
=== Men's ===
Year	Venue	Winner	Runner-up	Score	Ref
2022	Shengjin, Albania	(Latvia) Artemijs Žižins	(Moldova) Vladislav Gradinari	2–1	
2023	St. Paul's Bay, Malta	(Scotland) Jack Borwick	(Bulgaria) Maksim Kostov	3–1	
2024	Sarajevo, Bosnia Herzegovina	(Moldova) Vladislav Gradinari	(Wales) Riley Powell	4–1	
2025	Antalya, Turkey	(Poland) Michał Szubarczyk	(Poland) Krzysztof Czapnik	4–2	
2026	Gandia, Spain	(Poland) Krzysztof Czapnik	(Serbia) Tadija Matijasevic	4–2	

== See also ==
- EBSA European Snooker Championship
- EBSA European Under-21 Snooker Championships
- EBSA European Under-18 Snooker Championships
- IBSF World Under-18 Snooker Championship
- World Snooker Tour
