= Michał Szubarczyk =

Polish snooker player

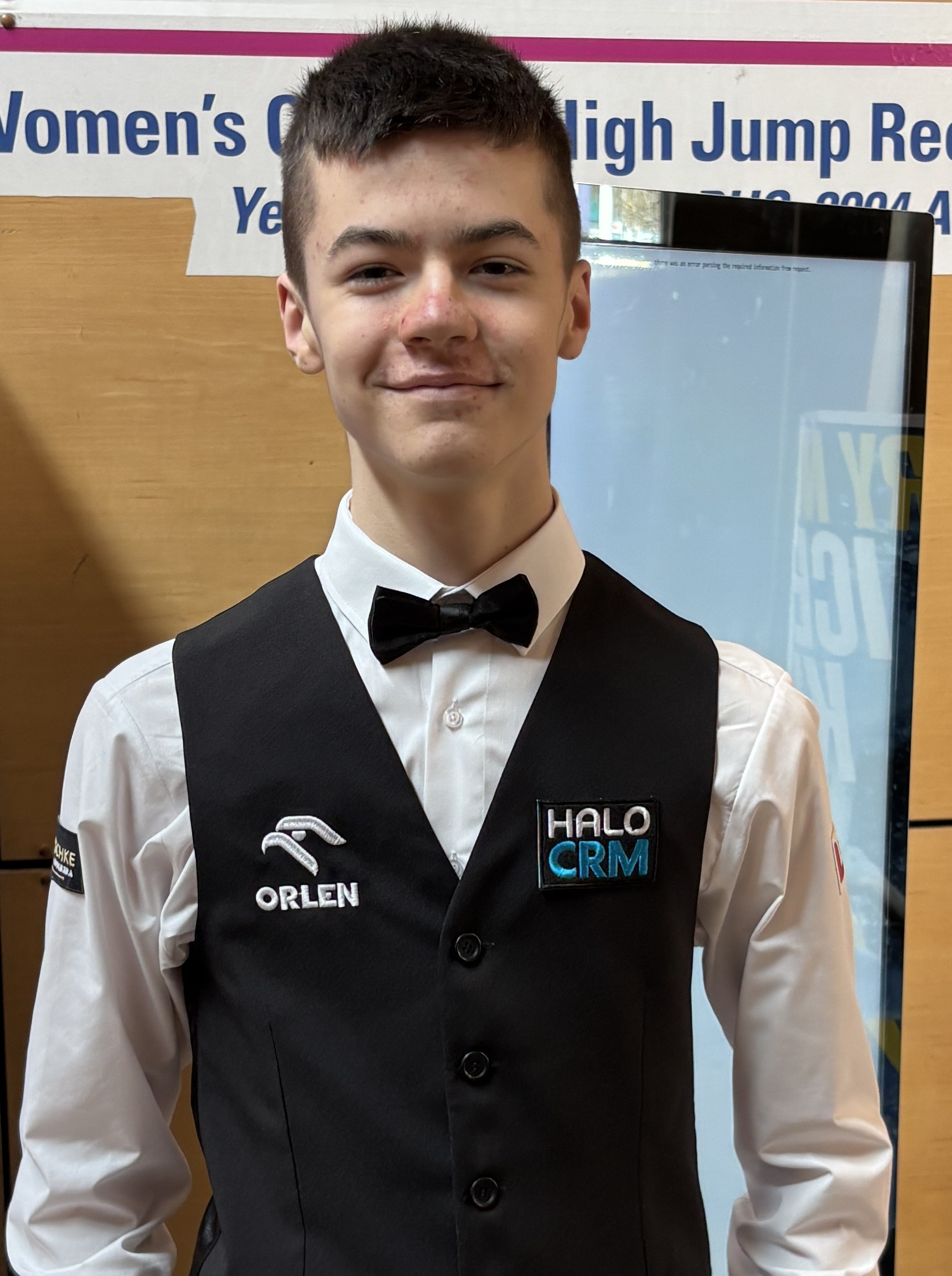

Personal information
- Born: 12 January 2011 (age 15) Lublin, Poland

Sport
- Country: Poland
- Sport: Snooker
- Professional: 2025–present
- Highest ranking: 77 (July 2026)
- Current ranking: 81 (as of 7 November 2026)
- Best ranking finish: Last 64 (x2)

Michał Szubarczyk (born 12 January 2011) is a Polish professional snooker player. In 2025, at the age of 14, he won the IBSF World Snooker Championship and also won a nomination for a two-year tour card on the World Snooker Tour, starting from the 2025–26 snooker season.

== Early and personal life ==
Szubarczyk is from Lublin, Poland. His mother works in a bank and his father Kamil ran his own business before moving to part-time work to support his son as a snooker coach and manager. Szubarczyk and his father had watched the sport on television together and Szubarczyk developed an interest, so they started playing snooker together at a local club when he was six years old. Szubarczyk's coach is his father, who was coached by Mateusz Nowak - assistant head coach European Billiards and Snooker Association. Michał Szubarczyk scored his first snooker maximum break in practice at the age of 12. He also likes playing football and chess. He uses home education instead of traditional school education to reconcile his student duties and snooker training.

== Career ==
At the age of 12, he won the Polish national championships at under-18 and under-21 level. In January 2024, he reached the quarter-final of the senior Polish snooker championships, aged 13. He became the Polish champion at six-red snooker, and became the Polish under-16 pool champion and the Polish junior champion at Snooker Shoot Out.

In August 2024, he won the IBSF World Under-21 Snooker Championship, defeating German Alexander Widau in the final in Bengaluru, India. He became the youngest ever winner of the tournament. He had lost in the under-17 semi-final earlier in the same week.

In March 2025, he won both the under-16 and EBSA European Under-18 Snooker Championship titles. Later that month, he reached the final of the EBSA European Snooker Championship with a win over Harvey Chandler, losing in the final to former professional Liam Highfield. With Highfield having already regained professional status for the following season through a different qualification route, Szubarczyk received the nomination to the World Snooker Tour for the 2025‍–‍26 and 2026‍–‍27 seasons, becoming the youngest ever professional player. He was awarded a place into the qualifying rounds for the 2025 World Snooker Championship where he lost in the first round 10-8 to Dean Young.

=== 2025–26 season ===
In June 2025, he was drawn to make his professional debut in the first round of qualifying for the 2025 Wuhan Open against former world champion Shaun Murphy, losing 5-0. That month, he had a narrow defeat in the qualifying round at the 2025 British Open in a deciding frame against Umut Dikme of Germany. He was drawn in the round-robin stage of the 2025 Championship League against Fan Zhengyi, Xu Si and Liam Highfield, finishing bottom of the group but earning a 2-2 draw against Fan. He recorded his first wins as a professional against Ryan Davies and Bulcsu Revesz as he reached the third round of the 2025 Saudi Arabia Snooker Masters before losing to English former world champion Stuart Bingham.

He reached the last-64 at the 2025 Xi'an Grand Prix with a win in a deciding frame 5-4 against world number 43 Martin O'Donnell, despite being pegged back from 4-1 up. He was then drawn against Thailand's Noppon Saengkham. He recorded a 6-4 win over Ishpreet Singh Chadha in qualifying at the 2025 International Championship.

In November 2025, he became the second youngest winner of the IBSF World Snooker Championship, after Yan Bingtao in 2014. That month, he defeated Jimmy White 6-2 in the first round of qualifying at the 2025 UK Championship. In the next round he was defeated by Noppon Saengkham, but made his first century break on tour, a 106 in frame five in a 6-3 defeat. On 11 December, he recorded a win over Jamie Jones at the 2025 Snooker Shoot Out.

Szubarczyk retains his EBSA European U18 title in March 2026, defeating Moldova’s Vladislav Gradinari in the final. The following month, he won his first round match in the qualifying rounds of the 2026 World Snooker Championship 10-7 against Ng On-yee. In doing so at the age of 15 years, two months and 25 days, he became the youngest player to win a match in the championships, breaking the previous record set by Liam Davies in 2022. In the second round he took a 5-3 overnight lead over Sanderson Lam, before winning 10-8. In the third round he lost 10-2 to experienced Iranian Hossein Vafaei.

=== 2026–27 season ===
Having been named Rookie of the Year at the conclusion of the 2025-26 season, in June 2026 he came from 5-0 down to level against 5-5 against Ross Muir, before Muir won the deciding frame to win 6-5 in the qualifying rounds of the 2026 China Open.

== Performance and rankings timeline ==
Tournament	2024/ 25	2025/ 26	2026/ 27
Ranking (Note: It shows the ranking at the beginning of the season)	(Note: He was an amateur)	(Note: New players on the Main Tour don't have a ranking)	77
Ranking tournaments
Championship League	A	RR	RR
China Open	Not Held		LQ
Wuhan Open	A	LQ	LQ
British Open	A	LQ	LQ
English Open	A	LQ	LQ
Shenzhen Open (Note: The event was called the Xi'an Grand Prix (2024/2025–2025/2026))	A	1R	LQ
Northern Ireland Open	A	LQ	LQ
International Championship	A	1R	LQ
UK Championship	A	LQ	LQ
Shoot Out	A	2R	
Scottish Open	A	LQ	LQ
German Masters	A	LQ	LQ
Welsh Open	A	1R	
World Grand Prix	DNQ	DNQ	
Players Championship	DNQ	DNQ	
World Open	A	LQ	
Tour Championship	DNQ	DNQ	
World Championship	LQ	LQ	
Former ranking tournaments
Saudi Arabia Masters	A	3R	NH

Performance Table Legend
LQ	lost in the qualifying draw	#R	lost in the early rounds of the tournament (WR = Wildcard round, RR = Round robin)	QF	lost in the quarter-finals
SF	lost in the semi-finals	F	lost in the final	W	won the tournament
DNQ	did not qualify for the tournament	A	did not participate in the tournament	WD	withdrew from the tournament

NH / Not Held	means an event was not held.
NR / Non-Ranking Event	means an event is/was no longer a ranking event.
R / Ranking Event	means an event is/was a ranking event.
MR / Minor-Ranking Event	means an event is/was a minor-ranking event.

== Career finals ==
=== Amateur finals: 5 (4 titles) ===
Outcome	No.	Year	Championship	Opponent in the final	Score
Winner	1.	2024	IBSF World Under-21 Snooker Championship	(Germany) Alexander Widau	5–1
Winner	2.	2025	EBSA European Under-16 Snooker Championship	(Poland) Krzysztof Czapnik	4–2
Winner	3.	2025	EBSA European Under-18 Snooker Championship	(England) Ethan Llewellyn	4–1
Runner-up	1.	2025	EBSA European Snooker Championship	(England) Liam Highfield	0–5
Winner	4.	2025	IBSF World Snooker Championship	(Qatar) Ali Alobaidli	5–2
