= 2025 Championship League (ranking) =

Snooker tournament, held June and July 2025

2025 BetVictor Championship League

Tournament information
- Dates: 30 June – 23 July 2025
- Venue: Leicester Arena
- City: Leicester
- Country: England
- Organisation: Matchroom Sport
- Format: Ranking event
- Total prize fund: £328,000
- Winner's share: £33,000
- Highest break: Fan Zhengyi (CHN) (147)

Final
- Champion: Stephen Maguire (SCO)
- Runner-up: Joe O'Connor (ENG)
- Score: 3–1

The 2025 Championship League (officially the 2025 BetVictor Championship League Snooker) was a professional ranking snooker tournament that took place from 30 June to 23 July 2025 at the Leicester Arena in Leicester, England. It was the sixth staging of the ranking edition of the tournament, which was first held in 2020. Organised by Matchroom Sport, it was the first ranking event of the 2025–26 snooker season, preceding the 2025 Saudi Arabia Snooker Masters. The winner received £33,000 from a total prize fund of £328,000.

Ali Carter was the defending champion, having defeated Jackson Page 3‍–‍1 in the final of the previous ranking edition, but he was eliminated in stage one. By topping her group in stage one, Ng On-yee became the first woman to reach the last 32 of a professional ranking event. Stephen Maguire won the tournament, beating Joe O'Connor 3‍–‍1 in the final to claim the seventh ranking title of his career and his first since winning the 2020 Tour Championship over five years earlier. Maguire's win secured him a place in the 2025 Champion of Champions tournament, while O'Connor's defeat meant that he had lost all three of the ranking finals he had played.

The event produced 109 century breaks (86 in stage one, 19 in stage two, and 4 in stage three), of which the highest was a maximum break by Fan Zhengyi in his stage one match against Xu Si. The second maximum of Fan's career, it was the first maximum of the season and the 218th official maximum in professional competition.

== Format ==
The competition began with 32 rounds of group matches with each group consisting of four players. Two groups were played to a finish every day using a two‑table setup in the arena. The groups were contested using a round‑robin format, with six matches played in each group. All matches in group play were played as best‑of‑four frames, with three points awarded for a win and one point for a draw. Group positions were determined by points scored, frame difference and then head‑to‑head results between players who were tied. Places that were still tied were then determined by the highest break made in the group. If the highest break was also tied, the next highest break made by the players was used.

The 32 players that topped the group tables qualified for the group winners' stage, consisting of eight groups of four players. The eight winners from the group winners' stage qualified for the two final groups, with the final taking place later on the same day. The winner received the Championship League title and a place in the 2025 Champion of Champions.

=== Participants ===
No player in the top eight of the world rankings entered the event. Only five top-16 players featured—Barry Hawkins, Zhang Anda, Shaun Murphy, Si Jiahui, and Chris Wakelin. Outside the top 16, Hossein Vafaei, Anthony McGill, Ishpreet Singh Chadha, Sunny Akani, and Ken Doherty also did not enter. Luca Brecel and Jimmy White entered but subsequently withdrew. The tournament featured 24 amateur players, not currently on the World Snooker Tour, indicated by (a) in the tables below.

=== Broadcasters ===
The event was broadcast by Fox Sports in Australia; Nova in Czechia and Slovakia; Maincast in Ukraine; Rigour in China; Viaplay in Iceland, and the Netherlands; Viasat in Scandinavia; and by Matchroom's YouTube channels in all other territories. DAZN was not announced as one of the broadcast partners, contrary to the previous editions.

=== Prize fund ===
The breakdown of prize money for the tournament is shown below.

- Stage one
- Winner: £3,000
- Runner-up: £2,000
- Third place: £1,000
- Fourth place: £0
- Stage two
- Winner: £4,000
- Runner-up: £3,000
- Third place: £2,000
- Fourth place: £1,000
- Stage three
- Winner: £6,000
- Runner-up: £4,000
- Third place: £2,000
- Fourth place: £1,000
- Final
- Winner: £20,000
- Runner-up: £10,000

- Tournament total: £328,000

Note: The champion received a total of £33,000 (£3,000 + £4,000 + £6,000 + £20,000).

== Stage one ==
Stage one consisted of 32 groups, each having four players. Numbers in parentheses after the players' names denote the players' seeding, and (a) indicates amateur players not on the main World Snooker Tour. Unlike other tournaments, where the defending champion is usually the top seed, the players were seeded according to their ranking, and the top 32 seeds were allocated to the 32 groups. One exception to this was Group 27, because Luca Brecel, seeded 27, withdrew.

=== Order of play ===
Order of play as follows:

Date	Group
30 June	Group 15
30 June	Group 26
1 July	Group 3
1 July	Group 22
2 July	Group 18
2 July	Group 25
3 July	Group 9
3 July	Group 28

Date	Group
4 July	Group 2
4 July	Group 32
5 July	Group 11
5 July	Group 17
7 July	Group 6
7 July	Group 7
8 July	Group 13
8 July	Group 14

Date	Group
9 July	Group 12
9 July	Group 19
10 July	Group 10
10 July	Group 23
11 July	Group 8
11 July	Group 21
12 July	Group 4
12 July	Group 30

Date	Group
14 July	Group 1
14 July	Group 20
15 July	Group 24
15 July	Group 31
16 July	Group 5
16 July	Group 16
17 July	Group 27
17 July	Group 29

=== Group 1 ===
Group 1 was played on 14 July. Haydon Pinhey won the group and advanced to Stage 2 Group A, eliminating top seed Barry Hawkins from the tournament.

==== Group 1 matches ====
- Barry Hawkins 2–2 John Astley
- Haydon Pinhey 1–3 Haris Tahir
- Haydon Pinhey 2–2 John Astley
- Barry Hawkins 3–0 Haris Tahir
- Haris Tahir 2–2 John Astley
- Barry Hawkins 0–3 Haydon Pinhey

==== Group 1 table ====
Pos.	Player	P	W	D	L	FW	FL	FD	HB	Pts.
1	Haydon Pinhey (ENG) (64)	3	1	1	1	6	5	1	90	4
2	Barry Hawkins (ENG) (1)	3	1	1	1	5	5	0	83	4
3	Haris Tahir (PAK) (65)	3	1	1	1	5	6	−1	74	4
4	John Astley (ENG) (a)	3	0	3	0	6	6	0	136	3

=== Group 2 ===
Group 2 was played on 4 July. Zhang Anda won the group and advanced to Stage 2 Group B.

==== Group 2 matches ====
- Zhang Anda 3–1 George Pragnell
- Cheung Ka Wai 2–2 Chris Totten
- Cheung Ka Wai 2–2 George Pragnell
- Zhang Anda 2–2 Chris Totten
- Chris Totten 1–3 George Pragnell
- Zhang Anda 2–2 Cheung Ka Wai

==== Group 2 table ====
Pos.	Player	P	W	D	L	FW	FL	FD	HB	Pts.
1	Zhang Anda (CHN) (2)	3	1	2	0	7	5	2	107	5
2	George Pragnell (ENG) (a)	3	1	1	1	6	6	0	112	4
3	Cheung Ka Wai (HKG) (63)	3	0	3	0	6	6	0	134	3
4	Chris Totten (SCO) (66)	3	0	2	1	5	7	−2	141	2

=== Group 3 ===
Group 3 was played on 1 July. Alfie Burden won the group and advanced to Stage 2 Group C.

==== Group 3 matches ====
- Shaun Murphy 1–3 Alfie Burden
- Bulcsú Révész 3–1 Robbie McGuigan
- Bulcsú Révész 0–3 Alfie Burden
- Shaun Murphy 1–3 Robbie McGuigan
- Robbie McGuigan 3–1 Alfie Burden
- Shaun Murphy 1–3 Bulcsú Révész

==== Group 3 table ====
Pos.	Player	P	W	D	L	FW	FL	FD	HB	Pts.
1	Alfie Burden (ENG) (a)	3	2	0	1	7	4	3	97	6
2	Robbie McGuigan (NIR) (67)	3	2	0	1	7	5	2	136	6
3	Bulcsú Révész (HUN) (62)	3	2	0	1	6	5	1	104	6
4	Shaun Murphy (ENG) (3)	3	0	0	3	3	9	−6	78	0

=== Group 4 ===
Group 4 was played on 12 July. Artemijs Žižins won the group and advanced to Stage 2 Group D.

==== Group 4 matches ====
- Si Jiahui 3–0 Kayden Brierley
- Artemijs Žižins 3–1 Farakh Ajaib
- Artemijs Žižins 3–0 Kayden Brierley
- Si Jiahui 2–2 Farakh Ajaib
- Farakh Ajaib 3–1 Kayden Brierley
- Si Jiahui 0–3 Artemijs Žižins

==== Group 4 table ====
Pos.	Player	P	W	D	L	FW	FL	FD	HB	Pts.
1	Artemijs Žižins (LVA) (61)	3	3	0	0	9	1	8	92	9
2	Si Jiahui (CHN) (4)	3	1	1	1	5	5	0	114	4
3	Farakh Ajaib (PAK) (68)	3	1	1	1	6	6	0	60	4
4	Kayden Brierley (ENG) (a)	3	0	0	3	1	9	−8	51	0

Note: Si Jiahui and Farakh Ajaib finished Group 4 equal on points and frame difference. Their head-to-head was a draw. Si made a higher break (114) and so was placed above Ajaib in the group.

=== Group 5 ===
Group 5 was played on 16 July. Chris Wakelin won the group and advanced to Stage 2 Group E.

==== Group 5 matches ====
- Chris Wakelin 3–1 Daniel Womersley
- Julien Leclercq 3–0 Mitchell Mann
- Julien Leclercq 2–2 Daniel Womersley
- Chris Wakelin 3–0 Mitchell Mann
- Mitchell Mann 2–2 Daniel Womersley
- Chris Wakelin 2–2 Julien Leclercq

==== Group 5 table ====
Pos.	Player	P	W	D	L	FW	FL	FD	HB	Pts.
1	Chris Wakelin (ENG) (5)	3	2	1	0	8	3	5	136	7
2	Julien Leclercq (BEL) (60)	3	1	2	0	7	4	3	115	5
3	Daniel Womersley (ENG) (a)	3	0	2	1	5	7	−2	59	2
4	Mitchell Mann (ENG) (69)	3	0	1	2	2	8	−6	39	1

=== Group 6 ===
Group 6 was played on 7 July. Liam Davies won the group, beating the defending champion Ali Carter, and advanced to Stage 2 Group F.

==== Group 6 matches ====
- Ali Carter 3–1 Jack Bradford
- Liam Davies 3–1 Huang Jiahao
- Liam Davies 3–1 Jack Bradford
- Ali Carter 3–1 Huang Jiahao
- Huang Jiahao 0–3 Jack Bradford
- Ali Carter 1–3 Liam Davies

==== Group 6 table ====
Pos.	Player	P	W	D	L	FW	FL	FD	HB	Pts.
1	Liam Davies (WAL) (59)	3	3	0	0	9	3	6	135	9
2	Ali Carter (ENG) (6)	3	2	0	1	7	5	2	119	6
3	Jack Bradford (WAL) (a)	3	1	0	2	5	6	−1	64	3
4	Huang Jiahao (CHN) (70)	3	0	0	3	2	9	−7	79	0

=== Group 7 ===
Group 7 was played on 7 July. Amir Sarkhosh won the group and advanced to Stage 2 Group G.

==== Group 7 matches ====
- Gary Wilson 2–2 Alex Clenshaw
- Amir Sarkhosh 2–2 Bai Yulu
- Amir Sarkhosh 3–1 Alex Clenshaw
- Gary Wilson 2–2 Bai Yulu
- Bai Yulu 2–2 Alex Clenshaw
- Gary Wilson 2–2 Amir Sarkhosh

==== Group 7 table ====
Pos.	Player	P	W	D	L	FW	FL	FD	HB	Pts.
1	Amir Sarkhosh (IRN) (58)	3	1	2	0	7	5	2	129	5
2	Gary Wilson (ENG) (7)	3	0	3	0	6	6	0	129	3
3	Bai Yulu (CHN) (71)	3	0	3	0	6	6	0	96	3
4	Alex Clenshaw (ENG) (a)	3	0	2	1	5	7	−2	64	2

Note: Gary Wilson and Bai Yulu finished Group 7 equal on points and frame difference. Their head-to-head was a draw. Wilson made a higher break (129) and so was placed above Bai in the group.

=== Group 8 ===
Group 8 was played on 11 July. Tom Ford won the group and advanced to Stage 2 Group H.

==== Group 8 matches ====
- Tom Ford 2–2 Simon Blackwell
- Allan Taylor 2–2 Mink Nutcharut
- Allan Taylor 2–2 Simon Blackwell
- Tom Ford 3–0 Mink Nutcharut
- Mink Nutcharut 1–3 Simon Blackwell
- Tom Ford 2–2 Allan Taylor

==== Group 8 table ====
Pos.	Player	P	W	D	L	FW	FL	FD	HB	Pts.
1	Tom Ford (ENG) (8)	3	1	2	0	7	4	3	132	5
2	Simon Blackwell (ENG) (a)	3	1	2	0	7	5	2	69	5
3	Allan Taylor (ENG) (57)	3	0	3	0	6	6	0	80	3
4	Mink Nutcharut (THA) (72)	3	0	1	2	3	8	−5	78	1

=== Group 9 ===
Group 9 was played on 3 July. Wu Yize won the group and advanced to Stage 2 Group H.

==== Group 9 matches ====
- Wu Yize 2–2 Craig Steadman
- Wang Yuchen 3–1 Kreishh Gurbaxani
- Wang Yuchen 1–3 Craig Steadman
- Wu Yize 3–0 Kreishh Gurbaxani
- Kreishh Gurbaxani 1–3 Craig Steadman
- Wu Yize 3–0 Wang Yuchen

==== Group 9 table ====
Pos.	Player	P	W	D	L	FW	FL	FD	HB	Pts.
1	Wu Yize (CHN) (9)	3	2	1	0	8	2	6	94	7
2	Craig Steadman (ENG) (a)	3	2	1	0	8	4	4	68	7
3	Wang Yuchen (HKG) (56)	3	1	0	2	4	7	−3	140	3
4	Kreishh Gurbaxani (IND) (73)	3	0	0	3	2	9	−7	119	0

=== Group 10 ===
Group 10 was played on 10 July. Ben Mertens won the group and advanced to Stage 2 Group G.

==== Group 10 matches ====
- Jak Jones 2–2 Alfie Davies
- Ben Mertens 3–0 Jonas Luz
- Ben Mertens 2–2 Alfie Davies
- Jak Jones 3–0 Jonas Luz
- Jonas Luz 0–3 Alfie Davies
- Jak Jones 0–3 Ben Mertens

==== Group 10 table ====
Pos.	Player	P	W	D	L	FW	FL	FD	HB	Pts.
1	Ben Mertens (BEL) (55)	3	2	1	0	8	2	6	131	7
2	Alfie Davies (WAL) (a)	3	1	2	0	7	4	3	102	5
3	Jak Jones (WAL) (10)	3	1	1	1	5	5	0	102	4
4	Jonas Luz (BRA) (74)	3	0	0	3	0	9	−9	22	0

=== Group 11 ===
Group 11 was played on 5 July. Stuart Bingham won the group and advanced to Stage 2 Group F.

==== Group 11 matches ====
- Stuart Bingham 3–0 Halim Hussain
- Antoni Kowalski 3–1 Hatem Yassen
- Antoni Kowalski 3–0 Halim Hussain
- Stuart Bingham 3–0 Hatem Yassen
- Hatem Yassen 3–0 Halim Hussain
- Stuart Bingham 3–1 Antoni Kowalski

==== Group 11 table ====
Pos.	Player	P	W	D	L	FW	FL	FD	HB	Pts.
1	Stuart Bingham (ENG) (11)	3	3	0	0	9	1	8	102	9
2	Antoni Kowalski (POL) (54)	3	2	0	1	7	4	3	88	6
3	Hatem Yassen (EGY) (75)	3	1	0	2	4	6	−2	53	3
4	Halim Hussain (ENG) (a)	3	0	0	3	0	9	−9	42	0

=== Group 12 ===
Group 12 was played on 9 July. David Gilbert won the group and advanced to Stage 2 Group E.

==== Group 12 matches ====
- David Gilbert 3–0 Paul Deaville
- Duane Jones 3–1 Louis Heathcote
- Duane Jones 3–0 Paul Deaville
- David Gilbert 3–1 Louis Heathcote
- Louis Heathcote 3–1 Paul Deaville
- David Gilbert 3–1 Duane Jones

==== Group 12 table ====
Pos.	Player	P	W	D	L	FW	FL	FD	HB	Pts.
1	David Gilbert (ENG) (12)	3	3	0	0	9	2	7	139	9
2	Duane Jones (WAL) (53)	3	2	0	1	7	4	3	118	6
3	Louis Heathcote (ENG) (86)	3	1	0	2	5	7	−2	128	3
4	Paul Deaville (ENG) (a)	3	0	0	3	1	9	−8	82	0

=== Group 13 ===
Group 13 was played on 8 July. Jack Lisowski won the group and advanced to Stage 2 Group D.

==== Group 13 matches ====
- Jack Lisowski 3–1 Ashley Carty
- Gong Chenzhi 2–2 Ross Muir
- Gong Chenzhi 3–0 Ashley Carty
- Jack Lisowski 3–0 Ross Muir
- Ross Muir 2–2 Ashley Carty
- Jack Lisowski 2–2 Gong Chenzhi

==== Group 13 table ====
Pos.	Player	P	W	D	L	FW	FL	FD	HB	Pts.
1	Jack Lisowski (ENG) (13)	3	2	1	0	8	3	5	101	7
2	Gong Chenzhi (CHN) (52)	3	1	2	0	7	4	3	103	5
3	Ross Muir (SCO) (85)	3	0	2	1	4	7	−3	66	2
4	Ashley Carty (ENG) (a)	3	0	1	2	3	8	−5	65	1

=== Group 14 ===
Group 14 was played on 8 July. Pang Junxu won the group and advanced to Stage 2 Group C.

==== Group 14 matches ====
- Pang Junxu 3–0 Dean Young
- Oliver Lines 2–2 Jiang Jun
- Oliver Lines 3–0 Dean Young
- Pang Junxu 1–3 Jiang Jun
- Jiang Jun 1–3 Dean Young
- Pang Junxu 3–0 Oliver Lines

==== Group 14 table ====
Pos.	Player	P	W	D	L	FW	FL	FD	HB	Pts.
1	Pang Junxu (CHN) (14)	3	2	0	1	7	3	4	136	6
2	Jiang Jun (CHN) (91)	3	1	1	1	6	6	0	123	4
3	Oliver Lines (ENG) (51)	3	1	1	1	5	5	0	74	4
4	Dean Young (SCO) (a)	3	1	0	2	3	7	−4	84	3

Note: Jiang Jun and Oliver Lines finished Group 14 equal on points and frame difference. Their head-to-head was a draw. Jiang made a higher break (123) and so was placed above Lines in the group.

=== Group 15 ===
Group 15 was played on 30 June. Stephen Maguire won the group and advanced to Stage 2 Group B.

==== Group 15 matches ====
- Stephen Maguire 3–1 James Cahill
- Michael Holt 2–2 Liam Graham
- Michael Holt 3–0 James Cahill
- Stephen Maguire 3–0 Liam Graham
- Liam Graham 2–2 James Cahill
- Stephen Maguire 3–0 Michael Holt

==== Group 15 table ====
Pos.	Player	P	W	D	L	FW	FL	FD	HB	Pts.
1	Stephen Maguire (SCO) (15)	3	3	0	0	9	1	8	119	9
2	Michael Holt (ENG) (50)	3	1	1	1	5	5	0	89	4
3	Liam Graham (SCO) (90)	3	0	2	1	4	7	−3	39	2
4	James Cahill (ENG) (a)	3	0	1	2	3	8	−5	71	1

=== Group 16 ===
Group 16 was played on 16 July. Joe O'Connor won the group and advanced to Stage 2 Group A.

==== Group 16 matches ====
- Joe O'Connor 3–1 Andrew Pagett
- Zak Surety 3–0 Liam Pullen
- Zak Surety 3–1 Andrew Pagett
- Joe O'Connor 3–0 Liam Pullen
- Liam Pullen 3–1 Andrew Pagett
- Joe O'Connor 3–0 Zak Surety

==== Group 16 table ====
Pos.	Player	P	W	D	L	FW	FL	FD	HB	Pts.
1	Joe O'Connor (ENG) (16)	3	3	0	0	9	1	8	116	9
2	Zak Surety (ENG) (49)	3	2	0	1	6	4	2	110	6
3	Liam Pullen (ENG) (92)	3	1	0	2	3	7	−4	77	3
4	Andrew Pagett (WAL) (a)	3	0	0	3	3	9	−6	78	0

=== Group 17 ===
Group 17 was played on 5 July. Elliot Slessor won the group and advanced to Stage 2 Group A.

==== Group 17 matches ====
- Elliot Slessor 3–1 Mark Lloyd
- Stan Moody 2–2 Oliver Brown
- Stan Moody 2–2 Mark Lloyd
- Elliot Slessor 3–0 Oliver Brown
- Oliver Brown 3–0 Mark Lloyd
- Elliot Slessor 3–1 Stan Moody

==== Group 17 table ====
Pos.	Player	P	W	D	L	FW	FL	FD	HB	Pts.
1	Elliot Slessor (ENG) (17)	3	3	0	0	9	2	7	113	9
2	Oliver Brown (ENG) (81)	3	1	1	1	5	5	0	65	4
3	Stan Moody (ENG) (48)	3	0	2	1	5	7	−2	97	2
4	Mark Lloyd (ENG) (a)	3	0	1	2	3	8	−5	95	1

=== Group 18 ===
Group 18 was played on 2 July. Yuan Sijun won the group and advanced to Stage 2 Group B. In his 3‍–‍0 win over Sanderson Lam, Yuan scored centuries in all three frames, of 104, 123 and 106.

==== Group 18 matches ====
- Yuan Sijun 3–0 Stuart Carrington
- Sanderson Lam 2–2 Alexander Ursenbacher
- Sanderson Lam 2–2 Stuart Carrington
- Yuan Sijun 3–0 Alexander Ursenbacher
- Alexander Ursenbacher 1–3 Stuart Carrington
- Yuan Sijun 3–0 Sanderson Lam

==== Group 18 table ====
Pos.	Player	P	W	D	L	FW	FL	FD	HB	Pts.
1	Yuan Sijun (CHN) (18)	3	3	0	0	9	0	9	123	9
2	Stuart Carrington (ENG) (a)	3	1	1	1	5	6	−1	73	4
3	Sanderson Lam (ENG) (47)	3	0	2	1	4	7	−3	89	2
4	Alexander Ursenbacher (SUI) (83)	3	0	1	2	3	8	−5	73	1

=== Group 19 ===
Group 19 was played on 9 July. Lei Peifan won the group and advanced to Stage 2 Group C.

==== Group 19 matches ====
- Lei Peifan 3–1 Ryan Davies
- Long Zehuang 3–0 Mateusz Baranowski
- Long Zehuang 1–3 Ryan Davies
- Lei Peifan 3–0 Mateusz Baranowski
- Mateusz Baranowski 3–1 Ryan Davies
- Lei Peifan 2–2 Long Zehuang

==== Group 19 table ====
Pos.	Player	P	W	D	L	FW	FL	FD	HB	Pts.
1	Lei Peifan (CHN) (19)	3	2	1	0	8	3	5	120	7
2	Long Zehuang (CHN) (46)	3	1	1	1	6	5	1	117	4
3	Ryan Davies (ENG) (a)	3	1	0	2	5	7	−2	92	3
4	Mateusz Baranowski (POL) (94)	3	1	0	2	3	7	−4	71	3

=== Group 20 ===
Group 20 was played on 14 July. David Lilley won the group and advanced to Stage 2 Group D.

==== Group 20 matches ====
- Zhou Yuelong 1–3 Ashley Hugill
- David Lilley 3–0 David Grace
- David Lilley 2–2 Ashley Hugill
- Zhou Yuelong 3–1 David Grace
- David Grace 2–2 Ashley Hugill
- Zhou Yuelong 1–3 David Lilley

==== Group 20 table ====
Pos.	Player	P	W	D	L	FW	FL	FD	HB	Pts.
1	David Lilley (ENG) (45)	3	2	1	0	8	3	5	128	7
2	Ashley Hugill (ENG) (a)	3	1	2	0	7	5	2	100	5
3	Zhou Yuelong (CHN) (20)	3	1	0	2	5	7	−2	84	3
4	David Grace (ENG) (78)	3	0	1	2	3	8	−5	83	1

=== Group 21 ===
Group 21 was played on 11 July. Liu Hongyu won the group and advanced to Stage 2 Group E.

==== Group 21 matches ====
- Noppon Saengkham 2–2 Patrick Whelan
- Liu Hongyu 3–0 Ian Burns
- Liu Hongyu 3–1 Patrick Whelan
- Noppon Saengkham 2–2 Ian Burns
- Ian Burns 3–0 Patrick Whelan
- Noppon Saengkham 2–2 Liu Hongyu

==== Group 21 table ====
Pos.	Player	P	W	D	L	FW	FL	FD	HB	Pts.
1	Liu Hongyu (CHN) (44)	3	2	1	0	8	3	5	133	7
2	Ian Burns (ENG) (79)	3	1	1	1	5	5	0	72	4
3	Noppon Saengkham (THA) (21)	3	0	3	0	6	6	0	96	3
4	Patrick Whelan (ENG) (a)	3	0	1	2	3	8	−5	78	1

=== Group 22 ===
Group 22 was played on 1 July. Matthew Selt won the group and advanced to Stage 2 Group F.

==== Group 22 matches ====
- Matthew Selt 3–1 Umut Dikme
- Scott Donaldson 3–1 Fergal Quinn
- Scott Donaldson 2–2 Umut Dikme
- Matthew Selt 3–1 Fergal Quinn
- Fergal Quinn 0–3 Umut Dikme
- Matthew Selt 3–1 Scott Donaldson

==== Group 22 table ====
Pos.	Player	P	W	D	L	FW	FL	FD	HB	Pts.
1	Matthew Selt (ENG) (22)	3	3	0	0	9	3	6	119	9
2	Umut Dikme (GER) (a)	3	1	1	1	6	5	1	107	4
3	Scott Donaldson (SCO) (43)	3	1	1	1	6	6	0	89	4
4	Fergal Quinn (NIR) (100)	3	0	0	3	2	9	−7	77	0

=== Group 23 ===
Group 23 was played on 10 July. Sam Craigie won the group and advanced to Stage 2 Group G.

==== Group 23 matches ====
- Jimmy Robertson 0–3 Sam Craigie
- Mark Davis 3–1 Connor Benzey
- Mark Davis 2–2 Sam Craigie
- Jimmy Robertson 3–0 Connor Benzey
- Connor Benzey 2–2 Sam Craigie
- Jimmy Robertson 2–2 Mark Davis

==== Group 23 table ====
Pos.	Player	P	W	D	L	FW	FL	FD	HB	Pts.
1	Sam Craigie (ENG) (80)	3	1	2	0	7	4	3	101	5
2	Mark Davis (ENG) (42)	3	1	2	0	7	5	2	101	5
3	Jimmy Robertson (ENG) (23)	3	1	1	1	5	5	0	92	4
4	Connor Benzey (ENG) (102)	3	0	1	2	3	8	−5	57	1

=== Group 24 ===
Group 24 was played on 15 July. Liu Wenwei won the group and advanced to Stage 2 Group H.

==== Group 24 matches ====
- Jackson Page 2–2 Zack Richardson
- Jordan Brown 0–3 Liu Wenwei
- Jordan Brown 2–2 Zack Richardson
- Jackson Page 1–3 Liu Wenwei
- Liu Wenwei 2–2 Zack Richardson
- Jackson Page 3–1 Jordan Brown

==== Group 24 table ====
Pos.	Player	P	W	D	L	FW	FL	FD	HB	Pts.
1	Liu Wenwei (CHN) (103)	3	2	1	0	8	3	5	134	7
2	Jackson Page (WAL) (24)	3	1	1	1	6	6	0	98	4
3	Zack Richardson (ENG) (a) (Note: Zack Richardson replaced Jimmy White (seeded 76) who withdrew.)	3	0	3	0	6	6	0	51	3
4	Jordan Brown (NIR) (41)	3	0	1	2	3	8	−5	69	1

=== Group 25 ===
Group 25 was played on 2 July. Matthew Stevens won the group and advanced to Stage 2 Group H.

==== Group 25 matches ====
- Ryan Day 3–1 Lan Yuhao
- Matthew Stevens 3–0 Xu Yichen
- Matthew Stevens 2–2 Lan Yuhao
- Ryan Day 3–1 Xu Yichen
- Xu Yichen 1–3 Lan Yuhao
- Ryan Day 1–3 Matthew Stevens

==== Group 25 table ====
Pos.	Player	P	W	D	L	FW	FL	FD	HB	Pts.
1	Matthew Stevens (WAL) (40)	3	2	1	0	8	3	5	80	7
2	Ryan Day (WAL) (25)	3	2	0	1	7	5	2	138	6
3	Lan Yuhao (CHN) (106)	3	1	1	1	6	6	0	142	4
4	Xu Yichen (CHN) (99)	3	0	0	3	2	9	−7	120	0

=== Group 26 ===
Group 26 was played on 30 June. Yao Pengcheng won the group and advanced to Stage 2 Group G.

==== Group 26 matches ====
- Lyu Haotian 2–2 Yao Pengcheng
- Jamie Jones 2–2 Zhao Hanyang
- Jamie Jones 1–3 Yao Pengcheng
- Lyu Haotian 3–1 Zhao Hanyang
- Zhao Hanyang 2–2 Yao Pengcheng
- Lyu Haotian 1–3 Jamie Jones

==== Group 26 table ====
Pos.	Player	P	W	D	L	FW	FL	FD	HB	Pts.
1	Yao Pengcheng (CHN) (95)	3	1	2	0	7	5	2	58	5
2	Jamie Jones (WAL) (39)	3	1	1	1	6	6	0	86	4
3	Lyu Haotian (CHN) (26)	3	1	1	1	6	6	0	95	4
4	Zhao Hanyang (CHN) (96)	3	0	2	1	5	7	−2	55	2

Note: Jamie Jones and Lyu Haotian finished Group 26 equal on points and frame difference. Jones won their head-to-head and so was placed above Lyu in the group.

=== Group 27 ===
Group 27 was played on 17 July. Dylan Emery won the group and advanced to Stage 2 Group F.

==== Group 27 matches ====
- Aaron Hill 3–0 Gary Thomson
- Dylan Emery 2–2 Sahil Nayyar
- Dylan Emery 3–0 Gary Thomson
- Aaron Hill 3–0 Sahil Nayyar
- Sahil Nayyar 1–3 Gary Thomson
- Aaron Hill 0–3 Dylan Emery

==== Group 27 table ====
Pos.	Player	P	W	D	L	FW	FL	FD	HB	Pts.
1	Dylan Emery (WAL) (89)	3	2	1	0	8	2	6	126	7
2	Aaron Hill (IRL) (38)	3	2	0	1	6	3	3	130	6
3	Gary Thomson (SCO) (a) (Note: Gary Thomson replaced Luca Brecel (seeded 27) who withdrew.)	3	1	0	2	3	7	−4	33	3
4	Sahil Nayyar (CAN) (105)	3	0	1	2	3	8	−5	39	1

=== Group 28 ===
Group 28 was played on 3 July. Ricky Walden won the group and advanced to Stage 2 Group E.

==== Group 28 matches ====
- Ricky Walden 3–1 Chang Bingyu
- Robert Milkins 2–2 Steven Hallworth
- Robert Milkins 2–2 Chang Bingyu
- Ricky Walden 2–2 Steven Hallworth
- Steven Hallworth 0–3 Chang Bingyu
- Ricky Walden 3–1 Robert Milkins

==== Group 28 table ====
Pos.	Player	P	W	D	L	FW	FL	FD	HB	Pts.
1	Ricky Walden (ENG) (28)	3	2	1	0	8	4	4	143	7
2	Chang Bingyu (CHN) (98)	3	1	1	1	6	5	1	102	4
3	Robert Milkins (ENG) (37)	3	0	2	1	5	7	−2	137	2
4	Steven Hallworth (ENG) (84)	3	0	2	1	4	7	−3	79	2

=== Group 29 ===
Group 29 was played on 17 July. Xu Si won the group and advanced to Stage 2 Group D. Fan Zhengyi made a maximum break in the second frame of his match against Xu. It was the first maximum of the current season, the second 147 of Fan's professional career, and the 218th official maximum.

==== Group 29 matches ====
- Xu Si 3–0 Michał Szubarczyk
- Fan Zhengyi 1–3 Liam Highfield
- Fan Zhengyi 2–2 Michał Szubarczyk
- Xu Si 3–1 Liam Highfield
- Liam Highfield 3–1 Michał Szubarczyk
- Xu Si 2–2 Fan Zhengyi

==== Group 29 table ====
Pos.	Player	P	W	D	L	FW	FL	FD	HB	Pts.
1	Xu Si (CHN) (29)	3	2	1	0	8	3	5	107 (Note: In the final frame of the match between Xu Si and Michał Szubarczyk, Xu made a break of 100 and then potted the final black ball, but the cue ball went into the green pocket, and was therefore a foul. This can be seen in the video of the match (at time-stamp 1:03:35). The in-off was not noticed by either player or by referee John Pellew who recorded the break as a 107, which is as shown in the WST match record and recorded by SnookerInfo. This error, however, made no difference to the outcome of the match or the group.)	7
2	Liam Highfield (ENG) (77)	3	2	0	1	7	5	2	86	6
3	Fan Zhengyi (CHN) (36)	3	0	2	1	5	7	−2	147	2
4	Michał Szubarczyk (POL) (104)	3	0	1	2	3	8	−5	91	1

=== Group 30 ===
Group 30 was played on 12 July. Robbie Williams won the group and advanced to Stage 2 Group C.

==== Group 30 matches ====
- Ben Woollaston 3–1 Iulian Boiko
- Robbie Williams 3–0 Florian Nüßle
- Robbie Williams 2–2 Iulian Boiko
- Ben Woollaston 3–1 Florian Nüßle
- Florian Nüßle 3–1 Iulian Boiko
- Ben Woollaston 1–3 Robbie Williams

==== Group 30 table ====
Pos.	Player	P	W	D	L	FW	FL	FD	HB	Pts.
1	Robbie Williams (ENG) (35)	3	2	1	0	8	3	5	110	7
2	Ben Woollaston (ENG) (30)	3	2	0	1	7	5	2	108	6
3	Florian Nüßle (AUT) (87)	3	1	0	2	4	7	−3	100	3
4	Iulian Boiko (UKR) (88)	3	0	1	2	4	8	−4	103	1

=== Group 31 ===
Group 31 was played on 15 July. Thepchaiya Un-Nooh won the group and advanced to Stage 2 Group B.

==== Group 31 matches ====
- Martin O'Donnell 3–0 Reanne Evans
- Thepchaiya Un-Nooh 2–2 Gao Yang
- Thepchaiya Un-Nooh 3–0 Reanne Evans
- Martin O'Donnell 3–1 Gao Yang
- Gao Yang 3–1 Reanne Evans
- Martin O'Donnell 0–3 Thepchaiya Un-Nooh

==== Group 31 table ====
Pos.	Player	P	W	D	L	FW	FL	FD	HB	Pts.
1	Thepchaiya Un-Nooh (THA) (34)	3	2	1	0	8	2	6	98	7
2	Martin O'Donnell (ENG) (31)	3	2	0	1	6	4	2	109	6
3	Gao Yang (CHN) (101)	3	1	1	1	6	6	0	131	4
4	Reanne Evans (ENG) (82)	3	0	0	3	1	9	−8	41	0

=== Group 32 ===
Group 32 was played on 4 July. Ng On-yee won the group and advanced to Stage 2 Group A. By topping the group, Ng became the first woman to reach the last 32 of a professional ranking event.

==== Group 32 matches ====
- Daniel Wells 2–2 Ng On-yee
- He Guoqiang 3–0 Leone Crowley
- He Guoqiang 2–2 Ng On-yee
- Daniel Wells 2–2 Leone Crowley
- Leone Crowley 0–3 Ng On-yee
- Daniel Wells 3–1 He Guoqiang

==== Group 32 table ====
Pos.	Player	P	W	D	L	FW	FL	FD	HB	Pts.
1	Ng On-yee (HKG) (97)	3	1	2	0	7	4	3	57	5
2	Daniel Wells (WAL) (32)	3	1	2	0	7	5	2	126	5
3	He Guoqiang (CHN) (33)	3	1	1	1	6	5	1	88	4
4	Leone Crowley (IRL) (93)	3	0	1	2	2	8	−6	134	1

== Stage two ==
Stage two consisted of eight groups, each having four players. Numbers in parentheses after the players' names denote the players' seeding, and (a) indicates amateur players not on the main World Snooker Tour.

=== Order of play ===
Order of play as follows:

Date	Group
18 July	Group A
18 July	Group B
19 July	Group C
19 July	Group D

Date	Group
21 July	Group E
21 July	Group F
22 July	Group G
22 July	Group H

=== Group A ===
Group A was played on 18 July. Joe O'Connor won the group and advanced to Stage 3, Winners' group 1.

==== Group A matches ====
- Joe O'Connor 3–0 Ng On-yee
- Elliot Slessor 2–2 Haydon Pinhey
- Elliot Slessor 3–1 Ng On-yee
- Joe O'Connor 3–1 Haydon Pinhey
- Haydon Pinhey 1–3 Ng On-yee
- Joe O'Connor 3–1 Elliot Slessor

==== Group A table ====
Pos.	Player	P	W	D	L	FW	FL	FD	HB	Pts.
1	Joe O'Connor (ENG) (16)	3	3	0	0	9	2	7	103	9
2	Elliot Slessor (ENG) (17)	3	1	1	1	6	6	0	77	4
3	Ng On-yee (HKG) (97)	3	1	0	2	4	7	−3	113	3
4	Haydon Pinhey (ENG) (64)	3	0	1	2	4	8	−4	90	1

=== Group B ===
Group B was played on 18 July. Stephen Maguire won the group and advanced to Stage 3, Winners' group 2.

==== Group B matches ====
- Zhang Anda 3–0 Thepchaiya Un-Nooh
- Stephen Maguire 2–2 Yuan Sijun
- Stephen Maguire 3–1 Thepchaiya Un-Nooh
- Zhang Anda 2–2 Yuan Sijun
- Yuan Sijun 2–2 Thepchaiya Un-Nooh
- Zhang Anda 1–3 Stephen Maguire

==== Group B table ====
Pos.	Player	P	W	D	L	FW	FL	FD	HB	Pts.
1	Stephen Maguire (SCO) (15)	3	2	1	0	8	4	4	84	7
2	Zhang Anda (CHN) (2)	3	1	1	1	6	5	1	93	4
3	Yuan Sijun (CHN) (18)	3	0	3	0	6	6	0	88	3
4	Thepchaiya Un-Nooh (THA) (34)	3	0	1	2	3	8	−5	71	1

=== Group C ===
Group C was played on 19 July. Pang Junxu won the group and advanced to Stage 3, Winners' group 2.

==== Group C matches ====
- Pang Junxu 3–1 Alfie Burden
- Lei Peifan 2–2 Robbie Williams
- Lei Peifan 2–2 Alfie Burden
- Pang Junxu 0–3 Robbie Williams
- Robbie Williams 0–3 Alfie Burden
- Pang Junxu 3–1 Lei Peifan

==== Group C table ====
Pos.	Player	P	W	D	L	FW	FL	FD	HB	Pts.
1	Pang Junxu (CHN) (14)	3	2	0	1	6	5	1	132	6
3	Alfie Burden (ENG) (a)	3	1	1	1	6	5	1	63	4
4	Robbie Williams (ENG) (35)	3	1	1	1	5	5	0	93	4
2	Lei Peifan (CHN) (19)	3	0	2	1	5	7	−2	68	2

=== Group D ===
Group D was played on 19 July. Xu Si won the group and advanced to Stage 3, Winners' group 1.

==== Group D matches ====
- Jack Lisowski 2–2 Artemijs Žižins
- Xu Si 3–0 David Lilley
- Xu Si 3–0 Artemijs Žižins
- Jack Lisowski 0–3 David Lilley
- David Lilley 2–2 Artemijs Žižins
- Jack Lisowski 2–2 Xu Si

==== Group D table ====
Pos.	Player	P	W	D	L	FW	FL	FD	HB	Pts.
1	Xu Si (CHN) (29)	3	2	1	0	8	2	6	102	7
2	David Lilley (ENG) (45)	3	1	1	1	5	5	0	92	4
3	Jack Lisowski (ENG) (13)	3	0	2	1	4	7	−3	69	2
4	Artemijs Žižins (LVA) (61)	3	0	2	1	4	7	−3	68	2

Note: Jack Lisowski and Artemijs Žižins finished Group D equal on points and frame difference. Their head-to-head was a draw. Lisowski made a higher break (69) and so was placed above Žižins in the group.

=== Group E ===
Group E was played on 21 July. Ricky Walden won the group and advanced to Stage 3, Winners' group 1.

==== Group E matches ====
- Chris Wakelin 2–2 Liu Hongyu
- David Gilbert 1–3 Ricky Walden
- David Gilbert 1–3 Liu Hongyu
- Chris Wakelin 2–2 Ricky Walden
- Ricky Walden 3–1 Liu Hongyu
- Chris Wakelin 0–3 David Gilbert

==== Group E table ====
Pos.	Player	P	W	D	L	FW	FL	FD	HB	Pts.
1	Ricky Walden (ENG) (28)	3	2	1	0	8	4	4	116	7
2	Liu Hongyu (CHN) (44)	3	1	1	1	6	6	0	63	4
3	David Gilbert (ENG) (12)	3	1	0	2	5	6	−1	114	3
4	Chris Wakelin (ENG) (5)	3	0	2	1	4	7	−3	79	2

=== Group F ===
Group F was played on 21 July. Matthew Selt won the group and advanced to Stage 3, Winners' group 2.

==== Group F matches ====
- Stuart Bingham 2–2 Dylan Emery
- Matthew Selt 2–2 Liam Davies
- Matthew Selt 3–1 Dylan Emery
- Stuart Bingham 1–3 Liam Davies
- Liam Davies 3–1 Dylan Emery
- Stuart Bingham 0–3 Matthew Selt

==== Group F table ====
Pos.	Player	P	W	D	L	FW	FL	FD	HB	Pts.
1	Matthew Selt (ENG) (22)	3	2	1	0	8	3	5	75	7
2	Liam Davies (WAL) (59)	3	2	1	0	8	4	4	126	7
3	Dylan Emery (WAL) (89)	3	0	1	2	4	8	−4	73	1
4	Stuart Bingham (ENG) (11)	3	0	1	2	3	8	−5	115	1

=== Group G ===
Group G was played on 22 July. Ben Mertens won the group and advanced to Stage 3, Winners' group 2.

==== Group G matches ====
- Ben Mertens 3–0 Yao Pengcheng
- Amir Sarkhosh 0–3 Sam Craigie
- Sam Craigie 0–3 Yao Pengcheng
- Ben Mertens 0–3 Amir Sarkhosh
- Amir Sarkhosh 2–2 Yao Pengcheng
- Ben Mertens 2–2 Sam Craigie

==== Group G table ====
Pos.	Player	P	W	D	L	FW	FL	FD	HB	Pts.
1	Ben Mertens (BEL) (55)	3	1	1	1	5	5	0	111	4
2	Amir Sarkhosh (IRN) (58)	3	1	1	1	5	5	0	90	4
3	Sam Craigie (ENG) (80)	3	1	1	1	5	5	0	69	4
4	Yao Pengcheng (CHN) (95)	3	1	1	1	5	5	0	67	4

Note: All four players finished Group G equal on points and frame difference. Their positions in the group were determined by their highest breaks.

=== Group H ===
Group H was played on 22 July. Tom Ford won the group and advanced to Stage 3, Winners' group 1.

==== Group H matches ====
- Tom Ford 3–0 Liu Wenwei
- Wu Yize 2–2 Matthew Stevens
- Wu Yize 3–1 Liu Wenwei
- Tom Ford 2–2 Matthew Stevens
- Matthew Stevens 3–1 Liu Wenwei
- Tom Ford 3–1 Wu Yize

==== Group H table ====
Pos.	Player	P	W	D	L	FW	FL	FD	HB	Pts.
1	Tom Ford (ENG) (8)	3	2	1	0	8	3	5	132	7
2	Matthew Stevens (WAL) (40)	3	1	2	0	7	5	2	116	5
3	Wu Yize (CHN) (9)	3	1	1	1	6	6	0	132	4
4	Liu Wenwei (CHN) (103)	3	0	0	3	2	9	−7	65	0

== Stage three ==
Stage three consisted of two groups, each having four players. Numbers in parentheses after the players' names denote the players' seeding.

=== Winners' group 1 ===
Winners' group 1 was played on 23 July. Joe O'Connor won the group and advanced to the final.

==== Winners' group 1 matches ====
- Tom Ford 2–2 Xu Si
- Joe O'Connor 3–1 Ricky Walden
- Joe O'Connor 3–1 Xu Si
- Tom Ford 2–2 Ricky Walden
- Ricky Walden 3–0 Xu Si
- Tom Ford 0–3 Joe O'Connor

==== Winners' group 1 table ====
Pos.	Player	P	W	D	L	FW	FL	FD	HB	Pts.
1	Joe O'Connor (ENG) (16)	3	3	0	0	9	2	7	69	9
2	Ricky Walden (ENG) (28)	3	1	1	1	6	5	1	122	4
3	Tom Ford (ENG) (8)	3	0	2	1	4	7	−3	120	2
4	Xu Si (CHN) (29)	3	0	1	2	3	8	−5	79	1

=== Winners' group 2 ===
Winners' group 2 was played on 23 July. Stephen Maguire won the group and advanced to the final.

==== Winners' group 2 matches ====
- Pang Junxu 0–3 Ben Mertens
- Stephen Maguire 3–0 Matthew Selt
- Stephen Maguire 3–0 Ben Mertens
- Pang Junxu 2–2 Matthew Selt
- Matthew Selt 2–2 Ben Mertens
- Pang Junxu 3–1 Stephen Maguire

==== Winners' group 2 table ====
Pos.	Player	P	W	D	L	FW	FL	FD	HB	Pts.
1	Stephen Maguire (SCO) (15)	3	2	0	1	7	3	4	78	6
2	Ben Mertens (BEL) (55)	3	1	1	1	5	5	0	115	4
3	Pang Junxu (CHN) (14)	3	1	1	1	5	6	−1	136	4
4	Matthew Selt (ENG) (22)	3	0	2	1	4	7	−3	97	2

=== Final ===
Final: Best-of-five frames. Referee: John Pellew; Leicester Arena, Leicester, England, 23 July 2025
Joe O'Connor (16); England	1–3	Stephen Maguire (15); Scotland
Frame scores: 0–102, 32–70, 103–1, 0–89
(frame 3) 99	Highest break	89 (frame 4)
0	Century breaks	0

== Century breaks ==
A total of 109 century breaks were made during the tournament with 86 in stage one, 19 in stage two, and 4 in stage three.

- 147 – Fan Zhengyi
- 143, 122, 121, 116, 111, 104 – Ricky Walden
- 142 – Lan Yuhao
- 141, 111 – Chris Totten
- 140, 125, 109 – Wang Yuchen
- 139, 129, 114, 105 – David Gilbert
- 138, 103 – Ryan Day
- 137 – Robert Milkins
- 136, 136, 132, 109, 101 – Pang Junxu
- 136, 128 – Robbie McGuigan
- 136 – John Astley
- 136 – Chris Wakelin
- 135, 126, 118, 116 – Liam Davies
- 134 – Cheung Ka Wai
- 134 – Leone Crowley
- 134 – Liu Wenwei
- 133, 104 – Liu Hongyu
- 132, 132, 131, 120 – Tom Ford
- 132, 100 – Wu Yize
- 131, 131, 130, 115, 111 – Ben Mertens
- 131, 124 – Gao Yang
- 130, 100 – Aaron Hill
- 129, 124 – Gary Wilson
- 129, 106 – Amir Sarkhosh
- 128, 120 – Louis Heathcote
- 128 – David Lilley
- 126, 103 – Dylan Emery
- 126 – Daniel Wells
- 123, 106, 104 – Yuan Sijun
- 123 – Jiang Jun
- 120 – Lei Peifan
- 120 – Xu Yichen
- 119, 103 – Ali Carter
- 119, 100 – Matthew Selt
- 119 – Kreishh Gurbaxani
- 119 – Stephen Maguire
- 118, 104 – Duane Jones
- 117 – Long Zehuang
- 116, 103 – Joe O'Connor
- 116 – Matthew Stevens
- 115, 102 – Stuart Bingham
- 115 – Julien Leclercq
- 114 – Si Jiahui
- 113 – Ng On-yee
- 113 – Elliot Slessor
- 112, 101 – George Pragnell
- 110 – Zak Surety
- 110 – Robbie Williams
- 109, 101 – Martin O'Donnell
- 108 – Ben Woollaston
- 107, 102 – Xu Si
- 107 – Umut Dikme
- 107 – Zhang Anda
- 104 – Bulcsú Révész
- 103 – Iulian Boiko
- 103 – Gong Chenzhi
- 102 – Chang Bingyu
- 102 – Alfie Davies
- 102 – Jak Jones
- 101 – Sam Craigie
- 101 – Mark Davis
- 101 – Jack Lisowski
- 100 – Ashley Hugill
- 100 – Florian Nüßle
