= 2024 Saudi Arabia Snooker Masters =

Snooker tournament

Tournament information
- Dates: 30 August – 7 September 2024
- Venue: Green Halls
- City: Riyadh
- Country: Saudi Arabia
- Organisation: World Snooker Tour
- Format: Ranking event
- Total prize fund: £2,302,000
- Winner's share: £500,000
- Highest break: Noppon Saengkham (THA) (147)

Final
- Champion: Judd Trump (ENG)
- Runner-up: Mark Williams (WAL)
- Score: 10–9

The 2024 Saudi Arabia Snooker Masters was a professional snooker tournament that took place from 30 August to 7 September 2024 at Green Halls in Riyadh, Saudi Arabia. Part of the 2024–25 snooker season, it was the first of two editions staged before the tournament was cancelled in 2026. The tournament featured a total prize fund of £2,302,000, the second-highest after the World Championship. It was billed as one of snooker's four major tournaments.

Judd Trump won the tournament, defeating Mark Williams 10‍–‍9 in the final. There were 91 century breaks made in the event, the highest being a 147 by Noppon Saengkham.

== Format ==
There were 17 amateur wildcard players from the Middle East included in the draw, including 7 from Saudi Arabia.

Rounds 1, 2, and 3 were the best of 7 frames; rounds 4 and 5 were the best of 9 frames; round 6, the quarter‑finals and the semi‑finals were the best of 11 frames; and the final was a best of 19 frames match, played over two sessions.

The tournament was broadcast on Eurosport and Discovery+ in Europe and by various broadcasters worldwide. It was also available on Matchroom Live.

=== Prize fund ===
The prize fund for the tournament is detailed below:

- Winner: £500,000
- Runner-up: £200,000
- Semi-final: £100,000
- Quarter-final: £50,000
- Last 16: £30,000
- Last 32: £20,000
- Last 48: £11,000
- Last 80: £7,000
- Last 112: £4,000
- Last 144: £2,000
- 147 break: £50,000 (Note: In addition to the maximum break prize, any player making two maximum breaks during this season's Triple Crown events as well as the Saudi Arabia Snooker Masters, would have been rewarded with a £147,000 bonus.)
- Total: £2,302,000

== Summary ==
=== Early rounds ===
==== Round 1 ====
Round 1 (last 144) matches were played on 30 August as the best of 7 frames. In the afternoon session Robbie McGuigan beat Abdulraouf Saigh 4‍–‍3, and Michael Holt whitewashed Ahmad Abul. In the evening session Jimmy White defeated Mohammed Shehab 4‍–‍2, and Stan Moody whitewashed Ziyad Alqabbani.

==== Round 2 ====
Round 2 (last 112) matches were played on 31 August as the best of 7 frames. In the afternoon session Artemijs Žižins beat Xu Si 4‍–‍3, and Jimmy White defeated Andrew Higginson 4‍–‍1. In the evening session Antoni Kowalski whitewashed He Guoqiang, and Bulcsú Révész beat Mark Davis 4‍–‍3.

==== Round 3 ====
Round 3 (last 80) matches were played on 1 September as the best of 7 frames. In the afternoon session Hossein Vafaei beat Ishpreet Singh Chadha 4‍–‍1, and Joe O'Connor defeated Louis Heathcote 4‍–‍3. In the evening session Neil Robertson defeated Paul Deaville 4‍–‍1. Noppon Saengkham made a maximum break in the first frame of his 4‍–‍1 win over Amir Sarkhosh, his third in professional competition and the first maximum of the 2024‍–‍25 season. Saengkham had also made the 13th and last maximum of the previous season.

==== Round 4 ====
Round 4 (last 48) matches were played on 2 September as the best of 9 frames. In the afternoon session Ben Woollaston beat Hossein Vafaei 5‍–‍3, and Thepchaiya Un-Nooh defeated Chris Wakelin 5‍–‍4. In the evening session David Gilbert beat Jordan Brown 5‍–‍3, and Neil Robertson defeated Gong Chenzhi 5‍–‍1.

=== Final rounds ===
==== Round 5 ====
Round 5 (last 32) matches were played on 3 September as the best of 9 frames. In the afternoon session Judd Trump fought back from 0‍–‍4 behind to beat Wu Yize 5‍–‍4, and Xiao Guodong defeated Mark Allen 5‍–‍1. In the evening session Ronnie O'Sullivan defeated Lei Peifan 5‍–‍1, and Zhang Anda whitewashed Ben Woollaston, making four century breaks in the five frames. Stuart Bingham beat Ding Junhui 5‍–‍4. In the deciding frame Ding's break ended when the tip came off his cue and hit a red ball. Bingham then made a 63 break to win the match.

==== Round 6 ====
Round 6 (last 16) matches were played on 4 September as the best of 11 frames. In the afternoon session Neil Robertson defeated Gary Wilson 6‍–‍1, and Judd Trump beat Jack Lisowski 6‍–‍1. In the evening session Ronnie O'Sullivan recovered from 3‍–‍0 down to defeat Zhang Anda 6‍–‍5, and Mark Williams beat Stuart Bingham 6‍–‍2. Jimmy Robertson beat the reigning world champion Kyren Wilson 6‍–‍4.

==== Quarter finals ====
The quarter-finals were played on 5 September as the best of 11 frames. In the afternoon session Shaun Murphy defeated Xiao Guodong 6‍–‍2, and Judd Trump beat Neil Robertson 6‍–‍3. In the evening session Mark Williams whitewashed Jimmy Robertson, and Si Jiahui beat Ronnie O'Sullivan 6‍–‍4.

==== Semi finals ====
The semi-finals were played on 6 September as the best of 11 frames. In the first semi‑final in the afternoon session Judd Trump played Shaun Murphy. At the mid‑session interval Trump led Murphy 3‍–‍1, and then went on to win the match 6‍–‍5. In the second semi‑final in the evening session Mark Williams played Si Jiahui. At the mid‑session interval Williams led Si 3‍–‍1, and then went on to win the match 6‍–‍3, although Si made two century breaks.

==== Final ====
The final took place on 7 September as the best of 19 frames, played over two sessions, between Mark Williams and Judd Trump. In the afternoon session, Trump took a 5‍–‍3 lead. However, Williams tied the scores at 6‍–‍6 and 8–8 and then made a 138 total clearance, his fourth century of the match, to move one from victory at 9–8. Trump tied the scores at 9–9 with a 90 break. The deciding frame was described as the most lucrative frame in snooker history, given the £300,000 difference between the prizes for the winner and the runner-up. Williams made a 62 break but missed a red, and Trump responded with a 72 clearance to win the match 10‍–‍9 on the final black. Trump said afterwards: "I'm in shock. Mark [Williams] was the much better player, I just found something at the end." Williams praised his opponent, saying: "It just shows what a great champion he is. What a break he has made there. For half a million pounds, 62 behind and two reds safe. What can I say? Congratulations to him."

== Final rounds ==
The draw for the final rounds is shown below. Numbers in parentheses after the players' names denote the players' seeding. Players in bold denote match winners.

**Round 5 (Last 32)**; Best of 9 frames
**Kyren Wilson (ENG) (1)**	**5**
Liu Hongyu (CHN) (64)	3
John Higgins (SCO) (16)	2
**Jimmy Robertson (ENG) (49)**	**5**
**Mark Williams (WAL) (9)**	**5**
Thepchaiya Un-Nooh (THA) (41)	4
Ding Junhui (CHN) (8)	4
**Stuart Bingham (ENG) (25)**	**5**
**Ronnie O'Sullivan (ENG) (5)**	**5**
Lei Peifan (CHN) (103)	1
**Zhang Anda (CHN) (12)**	**5**
Ben Woollaston (ENG) (53)	0
Tom Ford (ENG) (13)	2
**Si Jiahui (CHN) (20)**	**5**
Luca Brecel (BEL) (4)	2
**Pang Junxu (CHN) (29)**	**5**
**Judd Trump (ENG) (3)**	**5**
Wu Yize (CHN) (35)	4
Jak Jones (WAL) (14)	3
**Jack Lisowski (ENG) (19)**	**5**
**Gary Wilson (ENG) (11)**	**5**
David Gilbert (ENG) (22)	2
Mark Selby (ENG) (6)	3
**Neil Robertson (AUS) (27)**	**5**
**Shaun Murphy (ENG) (7)**	**5**
Yuan Sijun (CHN) (39)	2
Ali Carter (ENG) (10)	3
**Elliot Slessor (ENG) (42)**	**5**
Barry Hawkins (ENG) (15)	1
**Scott Donaldson (SCO) (47)**	**5**
Mark Allen (NIR) (2)	1
**Xiao Guodong (CHN) (34)**	**5**

**Round 6 (Last 16)**; Best of 11 frames
(England) Kyren Wilson (1)	4
**(England) Jimmy Robertson (49)**	**6**
**(Wales) Mark Williams (9)**	**6**
(England) Stuart Bingham (25)	2
**(England) Ronnie O'Sullivan (5)**	**6**
(China) Zhang Anda (12)	5
**(China) Si Jiahui (20)**	**6**
(China) Pang Junxu (29)	5
**(England) Judd Trump (3)**	**6**
(England) Jack Lisowski (19)	1
(England) Gary Wilson (11)	1
**(Australia) Neil Robertson (27)**	**6**
**(England) Shaun Murphy (7)**	**6**
(England) Elliot Slessor (42)	3
(Scotland) Scott Donaldson (47)	5
**(China) Xiao Guodong (34)**	**6**

**Quarter-finals**; Best of 11 frames
(England) Jimmy Robertson (49)	0
**(Wales) Mark Williams (9)**	**6**
(England) Ronnie O'Sullivan (5)	4
**(China) Si Jiahui (20)**	**6**
**(England) Judd Trump (3)**	**6**
(Australia) Neil Robertson (27)	3
**(England) Shaun Murphy (7)**	**6**
(China) Xiao Guodong (34)	2

**Semi-finals**; Best of 11 frames
**(Wales) Mark Williams (9)**	**6**
(China) Si Jiahui (20)	3
**(England) Judd Trump (3)**	**6**
(England) Shaun Murphy (7)	5

**Final**; Best of 19 frames
(Wales) Mark Williams (9)	9
**(England) Judd Trump (3)**	**10**

== Early rounds ==
The draw for the early rounds is shown below. Numbers in parentheses after the players' names denote the players' seeding, an "a" indicates amateur players who were not on the main World Snooker Tour. Players in bold denote match winners.

**Round 1 (Last 144)**; Best of 7 frames
**Rory Thor (MAS) (81)**	**4**
Omar Alajlani (KSA) (a)	0
Baipat Siripaporn (THA) (105)	3
**Mohamed Elkhayat (EGY) (a)**	**4**
**Chris Totten (SCO) (100)**	**4**
Haris Tahir (PAK) (121)	2
**Michael Holt (ENG) (98)**	**4**
Ahmad Abul (KUW) (a)	0
**Mink Nutcharut (THA) (102)**	**4**
Kusai Hamed (LBY) (a)	1
Reanne Evans (ENG) (89)	0
**Simon Blackwell (ENG) (a)**	**4**
**Artemijs Žižins** (LAT) (113)	**w/o**
Lim Kok Leong (MAS) (120) (Note: Lim Kok Leong did not show up for the round 1 match and so Artemijs Žižins was given a walkover.)	n/s
**Robbie McGuigan (NIR) (88)**	**4**
Abdulraouf Saigh (KSA) (a)	3
**Liam Graham (SCO) (85)**	**4**
Ali Hussain Ali (IRQ) (a)	0
**Oliver Lines (ENG) (107)**	**4**
Faisal Bahashwan (KSA) (a)	0
**Cheung Ka Wai (HKG) (93)**	**4**
Joshua Thomond (ENG) (a)	1
**Lei Peifan (CHN) (103)**	**4**
Bai Yulu (CHN) (119)	2
**Allan Taylor (ENG) (96)**	**4**
Adeel Aqdus (PAK) (a)	2
**Farakh Ajaib (PAK) (92)**	**4**
Haitham Al Mahri (OMN) (a)	0
**Julien Leclercq (BEL) (112)**	**4**
Dylan Emery (WAL) (a)	2
**Jimmy White (ENG) (84)**	**4**
Mohammed Shehab (UAE) (115)	2
**Andrew Pagett (WAL) (83)**	**4**
Wang Yuchen (HKG) (116)	2
**Huang Jiahao (CHN) (108)**	**4**
Ahmed Aly Elsayed (USA) (106)	0
**Ben Mertens (BEL) (94)**	**4**
Abdullah Alotayyani (KSA) (a)	0
**Antoni Kowalski (POL) (101)**	**4**
Habib Subah Humood (BHR) (a)	1
**Gong Chenzhi (CHN) (104)**	**4**
Ali Jalil Ali (IRQ) (a)	0
Mitchell Mann (ENG) (91)	3
**Paul Deaville (ENG) (a)**	**4**
**Bulcsú Révész (HUN) (111)**	**4**
Iulian Boiko (UKR) (a)	2
**Dean Young (SCO) (86)**	**4**
Saleh Alamoudi (KSA) (a)	0
Mostafa Dorgham (EGY) (87)	1
**Jonas Luz (BRA) (122)**	**4**
**Haydon Pinhey (ENG) (109)**	**4**
Ayman Alamri (KSA) (a)	0
Manasawin Phetmalaikul (THA) (90)	0
**Amir Sarkhosh (IRN) (117)**	**4**
**Zak Surety (ENG) (97)**	**4**
Ali Al Obaidly (QAT) (a)	0
**Duane Jones (WAL) (99)**	**4**
Khalid Al Kamali (UAE) (a)	1
**Liam Davies (WAL) (95)**	**4**
Ken Doherty (IRL) (114)	3
Kreishh Gurbaxani (IND) (110)	0
**Sunny Akani (THA) (118)**	**4**
**Stan Moody (ENG) (82)**	**4**
Ziyad Alqabbani (KSA) (a)	0

**Round 2 (Last 112)**; Best of 7 frames
Hammad Miah (ENG) (80)	1
**Rory Thor (MAS) (81)**	**4**
**Jimmy Robertson (ENG) (49)**	**4**
Mohamed Elkhayat (EGY) (a)	2
**Ashley Carty (ENG) (65)**	**4**
Chris Totten (SCO) (100)	0
**Liu Hongyu (CHN) (64)**	**4**
Michael Holt (ENG) (98)	2
**Anthony Hamilton (ENG) (57)**	**4**
Mink Nutcharut (THA) (102)	2
**Xing Zihao (CHN) (72)**	**4**
Simon Blackwell (ENG) (a)	2
Xu Si (CHN) (56)	3
**Artemijs Žižins (LAT) (113)**	**4**
Ma Hailong (CHN) (73)	3
**Robbie McGuigan (NIR) (88)**	**4**
**Ishpreet Singh Chadha (IND) (76)**	**4**
Liam Graham (SCO) (85)	1
**Ben Woollaston (ENG) (53)**	**4**
Oliver Lines (ENG) (107)	2
**Louis Heathcote (ENG) (69)**	**4**
Cheung Ka Wai (HKG) (93)	2
Jamie Clarke (WAL) (60)	3
**Lei Peifan (CHN) (103)**	**4**
Aaron Hill (IRL) (61)	2
**Allan Taylor (ENG) (96)**	**4**
**Stuart Carrington (ENG) (68)**	**4**
Farakh Ajaib (PAK) (92)	2
**Graeme Dott (SCO) (52)**	**4**
Julien Leclercq (BEL) (112)	3
Andrew Higginson (ENG) (77)	1
**Jimmy White (ENG) (84)**	**4**
Alexander Ursenbacher (SUI) (78)	3
**Andrew Pagett (WAL) (83)**	**4**
**Martin O'Donnell (ENG) (51)**	**4**
Huang Jiahao (CHN) (108)	0
Long Zehuang (CHN) (67)	0
**Ben Mertens (BEL) (94)**	**4**
He Guoqiang (CHN) (62)	0
**Antoni Kowalski (POL) (101)**	**4**
David Grace (ENG) (59)	2
**Gong Chenzhi (CHN) (104)**	**4**
Ian Burns (ENG) (70)	0
**Paul Deaville (ENG) (a)**	**4**
Mark Davis (ENG) (54)	3
**Bulcsú Révész (HUN) (111)**	**4**
**Alfie Burden (ENG) (75)**	**4**
Dean Young (SCO) (86)	3
**Jiang Jun (CHN) (74)**	**4**
Jonas Luz (BRA) (122)	1
David Lilley (ENG) (55)	2
**Haydon Pinhey (ENG) (109)**	**4**
Ross Muir (SCO) (71)	3
**Amir Sarkhosh (IRN) (117)**	**4**
**Sanderson Lam (ENG) (58)**	**4**
Zak Surety (ENG) (97)	3
Daniel Wells (WAL) (63)	2
**Duane Jones (WAL) (99)**	**4**
**Marco Fu (HKG) (66)**	**4**
Liam Davies (WAL) (95)	0
**Tian Pengfei (CHN) (50)**	**4**
Sunny Akani (THA) (118)	2
Liam Pullen (ENG) (79)	1
**Stan Moody (ENG) (82)**	**4**

**Round 3 (Last 80)**; Best of 7 frames
Robert Milkins (ENG) (17)	3
**Rory Thor (MAS) (81)**	**4**
Fan Zhengyi (CHN) (48)	3
**Jimmy Robertson (ENG) (49)**	**4**
Anthony McGill (SCO) (32)	1
**Ashley Carty (ENG) (65)**	**4**
Ricky Walden (ENG) (33)	1
**Liu Hongyu (CHN) (64)**	**4**
Jamie Jones (WAL) (40)	2
**Anthony Hamilton (ENG) (57)**	**4**
**Stuart Bingham (ENG) (25)**	**4**
Xing Zihao (CHN) (72)	2
**Thepchaiya Un-Nooh (THA) (41)**	**4**
Artemijs Žižins (LAT) (113)	1
**Chris Wakelin (ENG) (24)**	**4**
Robbie McGuigan (NIR) (88)	2
**Hossein Vafaei (IRN) (21)**	**4**
Ishpreet Singh Chadha (IND) (76)	1
Joe Perry (ENG) (44)	0
**Ben Woollaston (ENG) (53)**	**4**
**Joe O'Connor (ENG) (28)**	**4**
Louis Heathcote (ENG) (69)	3
Robbie Williams (ENG) (37)	3
**Lei Peifan (CHN) (103)**	**4**
**Matthew Selt (ENG) (36)**	**4**
Allan Taylor (ENG) (96)	3
**Pang Junxu (CHN) (29)**	**4**
Stuart Carrington (ENG) (68)	3
Sam Craigie (ENG) (45) (Note: Sam Craigie withdrew from the round 3 match because of injury and so Graeme Dott was given a walkover.)	w/d
**Graeme Dott** (SCO) (52)	**w/o**
**Si Jiahui (CHN) (20)**	**4**
Jimmy White (ENG) (84)	2
**Jack Lisowski (ENG) (19)**	**4**
Andrew Pagett (WAL) (83)	3
Matthew Stevens (WAL) (46)	3
**Martin O'Donnell (ENG) (51)**	**4**
**Stephen Maguire (SCO) (30)**	**4**
Ben Mertens (BEL) (94)	0
**Wu Yize (CHN) (35)**	**4**
Antoni Kowalski (POL) (101)	0
Jackson Page (WAL) (38)	2
**Gong Chenzhi (CHN) (104)**	**4**
**Neil Robertson (AUS) (27)**	**4**
Paul Deaville (ENG) (a)	1
**Jordan Brown (NIR) (43)**	**4**
Bulcsú Révész (HUN) (111)	3
**David Gilbert (ENG) (22)**	**4**
Alfie Burden (ENG) (75)	0
**Zhou Yuelong (CHN) (23)**	**4**
Jiang Jun (CHN) (74)	2
**Elliot Slessor (ENG) (42)**	**4**
Haydon Pinhey (ENG) (109)	2
**Noppon Saengkham (THA) (26)**	**4**
Amir Sarkhosh (IRN) (117)	1
**Yuan Sijun (CHN) (39)**	**4**
Sanderson Lam (ENG) (58)	1
**Xiao Guodong (CHN) (34)**	**4**
Duane Jones (WAL) (99)	3
**Lyu Haotian (CHN) (31)**	**4**
Marco Fu (HKG) (66)	3
**Scott Donaldson (SCO) (47)**	**4**
Tian Pengfei (CHN) (50)	2
**Ryan Day (WAL) (18)**	**4**
Stan Moody (ENG) (82)	2

**Round 4 (Last 48)**; Best of 9 frames
(Malaysia) Rory Thor (81)	0
**(England) Jimmy Robertson (49)**	**5**
(England) Ashley Carty (65)	2
**(China) Liu Hongyu (64)**	**5**
(England) Anthony Hamilton (57)	3
**(England) Stuart Bingham (25)**	**5**
**(Thailand) Thepchaiya Un-Nooh (41)**	**5**
(England) Chris Wakelin (24)	4
(Iran) Hossein Vafaei (21)	3
**(England) Ben Woollaston (53)**	**5**
(England) Joe O'Connor (28)	2
**(China) Lei Peifan (103)**	**5**
(England) Matthew Selt (36)	3
**(China) Pang Junxu (29)**	**5**
(Scotland) Graeme Dott (52)	0
**(China) Si Jiahui (20)**	**5**
**(England) Jack Lisowski (19)**	**5**
(England) Martin O'Donnell (51)	2
(Scotland) Stephen Maguire (30)	4
**(China) Wu Yize (35)**	**5**
(China) Gong Chenzhi (104)	1
**(Australia) Neil Robertson (27)**	**5**
(Northern Ireland) Jordan Brown (43)	3
**(England) David Gilbert (22)**	**5**
(China) Zhou Yuelong (23)	2
**(England) Elliot Slessor (42)**	**5**
(Thailand) Noppon Saengkham (26)	4
**(China) Yuan Sijun (39)**	**5**
**(China) Xiao Guodong (34)**	**5**
(China) Lyu Haotian (31)	2
**(Scotland) Scott Donaldson (47)**	**5**
(Wales) Ryan Day (18)	2

Note: n/s=no-show (did not show up for the match); w/d=withdrawn; w/o=walkover

== Final ==
Final: Best of 19 frames. Referee: Olivier Marteel; Green Halls, Riyadh, Saudi Arabia, 7 September 2024
Mark Williams (9); Wales	9–10	Judd Trump (3); England
Afternoon: 82–39, 48–59, 5–83, 1–68, 30–63, 121–0 (121), 132–0 (132), 18–56; Evening: 68–16, 8–76, 101–0 (101), 64–37, 77–0, 30–76, 42–72, 92–16, 138–0 (138), 0–90, 62–72
(frame 17) 138	Highest break	90 (frame 18)
4	Century breaks	0

== Century breaks ==
A total of 91 century breaks were made during the tournament.

- 147, 126, 108, 104 – Noppon Saengkham
- 141, 115, 114, 103, 101 – Neil Robertson
- 140, 124 – Stuart Bingham
- 140 – Pang Junxu
- 138, 138, 138, 128 – Zhang Anda
- 138, 136, 116, 102 – Si Jiahui
- 138, 133, 132, 121, 101, 101 – Mark Williams
- 138, 127, 122 – Jimmy Robertson
- 137, 124, 103, 100 – David Gilbert
- 137 – Artemijs Žižins
- 136 – Cheung Ka Wai
- 134, 127 – Elliot Slessor
- 133, 115 – Ben Woollaston
- 133, 102 – Louis Heathcote
- 132 – Stephen Maguire
- 131, 109, 109, 103 – Ronnie O'Sullivan
- 130 – Oliver Lines
- 127 – Anthony Hamilton
- 127 – Ben Mertens
- 126, 115, 105, 101, 100 – Judd Trump
- 126, 104 – Mark Selby
- 125, 120, 112 – Ryan Day
- 125, 102 – Gary Wilson
- 123, 108 – Xiao Guodong
- 123 – Marco Fu
- 122, 120 – Yuan Sijun
- 121 – Liam Davies
- 119, 115 – Xing Zihao
- 119 – Gong Chenzhi
- 118 – Kyren Wilson
- 116 – Graeme Dott
- 112, 102 – Julien Leclercq
- 111, 105 – Scott Donaldson
- 111 – Shaun Murphy
- 110 – Duane Jones
- 108 – Daniel Wells
- 107 – Stuart Carrington
- 105 – Liu Hongyu
- 104 – Mark Allen
- 104 – Joe O'Connor
- 103, 103 – Jack Lisowski
- 103 – Ali Carter
- 103 – Stan Moody
- 101 – Ding Junhui
- 101 – Andrew Higginson
- 101 – Dean Young
- 100 – Chris Wakelin
