= Saudi Arabia Snooker Masters =

Snooker ranking tournament in Saudi Arabia

Tournament information
- Venue: Green Halls, Prince Abdullah Al-Faisal Sports City
- Location: Jeddah
- Country: Saudi Arabia
- Established: 2024
- Organisation(s): World Snooker Tour
- Format: Ranking event
- Total prize fund: £2,302,000
- Final year: 2025
- Final champion: Neil Robertson (AUS)

The Saudi Arabia Snooker Masters was a professional snooker ranking tournament that took place in 2024 and 2025. The 2024 edition was staged in Riyadh and won by Judd Trump, and the 2025 edition was held in Jeddah and won by Neil Robertson. Organised by the World Snooker Tour in collaboration with the Saudi Arabian Billiards & Snooker Federation (SABSF), the tournament was branded as one of snooker's four major tournaments. It featured a total prize fund of £2,302,000, the second-highest after the World Championship. It was the latest attempt to bring ranking snooker events to the Middle East since the Bahrain Championship in 2008 and the Dubai Classic in the 1980s.

In April 2026, the World Snooker Tour announced that the event had been cancelled. It is replaced by the China Open on the calendar.

== History ==
In February 2024, World Snooker Tour (WST) announced the addition of the Saudi Arabia Snooker Masters to the calendar, beginning in the 2024–25 season, as part of a ten-year deal. The 2024 edition was the first ranking tournament to be held in Saudi Arabia, following the non-ranking 2024 World Masters of Snooker event in March which was also held in Riyadh. The tournament featured a total prize fund of £2,302,000, the second-highest after the World Championship, and the World Snooker Tour promoted it as snooker's "fourth major" alongside the existing Triple Crown events of the World Championship, the UK Championship, and the Masters.

The event attracted criticism from journalists, who accused the country of sportswashing. However, players welcomed the event, lauding its "astronomical" prize fund and the opportunity to promote the sport in the Middle East.

In May 2025, it was announced that the tournament would be moving from Riyadh to Jeddah for the 2025 event.

On 25 April 2026, World Snooker Tour confirmed that the event had been cancelled with immediate effect, and that no future editions will be staged.

== Winners ==
Year	Winner	Runner-up	Final score	Venue	City	Season
2024	Judd Trump (ENG)	Mark Williams (WAL)	10–9	Green Halls	Riyadh	2024–25
2025	Neil Robertson (AUS)	Ronnie O'Sullivan (ENG)	10–9	Al-Faisal Sports City	Jeddah	2025–26

== See also ==
- Dubai Classic
- Bahrain Championship
