= Oliver Sykes (snooker player) =

English snooker player (born 2005)

Personal information
- Born: 12 December 2005 (age 20)

Sport
- Country: England
- Sport: Snooker
- Professional: 2026–present
- Highest ranking: 101 (August 2026)
- Current ranking: 107 (as of 7 November 2026)

Oliver Sykes (born 12 December 2005) is an English snooker player from Eastleigh, Hampshire. He has a two-year tour card on the World Snooker Tour, starting from the 2026–27 snooker season.

== Early life ==
A left-hander from Eastleigh, Hampshire, by the age of eleven years-old he had won five consecutive titles from his local Eastleigh & District under-13 league. That year, he also won the local Eastleigh & District under-19 league. As a 16 year-old in 2022, he became the champion at Chandlers Ford Snooker Club in Hampshire.

== Career ==
Aged 15 years-old, Sykes was given a wildcard to the 2021 English Open in Milton Keynes where he faced Allan Taylor. The following year, he was runner-up to Callum Beresford in the English U21 Championship.

=== 2023-24 season ===
In September and October 2023, Sykes won the opening two events on the English Junior Snooker Tour placed him to the top of the national junior rankings.

Given a wildcard to the 2023 UK Championship as the number one ranked junior player, he faced Alfie Burden in the first qualifying round and beat his more experienced opponent 6-1. in the following round he was defeated 6-4 by Jamie Clarke. In December 2023, he recorded a victory over experience professional Rod Lawler at the 2023 Snooker Shoot Out.

At the WSF Junior Snooker Championship held in Albania in February 2024, he reached the semi-finals before he was defeated by eventual champion Bulcsú Révész.

In April 2024, he played in the first round of qualifying for the 2024 World Snooker Championship, and lost to Louis Heathcote 10-6. That month, he reached the semi-finals of the English under-21 championships.

He entered Q School in May 2024, in the first event he was defeated by German Umut Dikme.

=== 2024-25 ===
At the 2024 English Open in Brentwood, Essex in September 2024, he reached the second round with a win over Julien Leclercq.

He defeated Sean O'Sullivan in the quarterfinals of the Q Tour Global Play-Offs in Antalya in March 2025. That month, he reached the final of the 2025 EBSA European Under-21 Snooker Championships, where he faced Ukrainian Iulian Boiko, losing on a decider 5-4.

=== 2025-26 ===
He reached the final day of the first three events in the European Q Tour. He was awarded a wildcard into the 2025 English Open with the number one ranking on the EPSB Junior Tour. In the first round of qualifying at the 2025 UK Championship, he was defeated 6-1 by Irishman Robbie McGuigan. In March 2026, he qualified for the WPBSA Q Tour Global Play-Offs. He was granted a two-year tour card on the World Snooker Tour, starting from the 2026–27 snooker season after reaching the final of the EBSA European Snooker Championship in March 2026, his run including wins over Ashley Carty and Umut Dikme. In April, he recorded a 10-4 win over Liam Graham in the first round of qualifying for the 2026 World Snooker Championship, before recording a rare break of 146 in his second round victory over Lyu Haotian, only the 28th player to achieve the feat in competition. In the penultimate round of qualifying he was defeated by 10-3 by Zak Surety.

=== 2026-27 ===
Sykes won his first match as a professional on 10 June 2026, competing in the qualifying rounds for the 2026 China Open, a 6-1 victory against Liu Wenwei. That month, he also reached the penultimate round of qualifying for the 2026 Wuhan Open with a win against Ross Muir. In September, he beat Zak Surety 4-3 to reach the main draw at the 2026 Northern Ireland Open. In November, he defeated experienced player Peter Lines in qualifying at the 2026 UK Championship to set-up a match against his son Oliver Lines in the next round.

== Performance and rankings timeline ==
Tournament	2021/ 22	2023/ 24	2024/ 25	2025/ 26	2026/ 27
Ranking (Note: It shows the ranking at the beginning of the season)	(Note: He was an amateur)				(Note: New players on the Main Tour don't have a ranking)
Ranking tournaments
Championship League	A	A	A	A	RR
China Open	Tournament Not Held				LQ
Wuhan Open	NH	A	A	A	LQ
British Open	A	A	A	A	LQ
English Open	LQ	A	LQ	LQ	LQ
Shenzhen Open (Note: The event was called the Xi'an Grand Prix (2024/2025–2025/2026))	Not Held		A	A	LQ
Northern Ireland Open	A	A	A	A	1R
International Championship	NH	A	A	A	LQ
UK Championship	A	LQ	LQ	LQ	
Shoot Out	A	2R	A	A	
Scottish Open	A	A	A	A	LQ
German Masters	A	A	A	A	LQ
Welsh Open	A	A	A	A	
World Grand Prix	DNQ	DNQ	DNQ	DNQ	
Players Championship	DNQ	DNQ	DNQ	DNQ	
World Open	NH	A	A	A	
Tour Championship	DNQ	DNQ	DNQ	DNQ	
World Championship	A	LQ	A	LQ	

Performance Table Legend
LQ	lost in the qualifying draw	#R	lost in the early rounds of the tournament (WR = Wildcard round, RR = Round robin)	QF	lost in the quarter-finals
SF	lost in the semi-finals	F	lost in the final	W	won the tournament
DNQ	did not qualify for the tournament	A	did not participate in the tournament	WD	withdrew from the tournament

NH / Not Held	means an event was not held
NR / Non-Ranking Event	means an event is/was no longer a ranking event
R / Ranking Event	means an event is/was a ranking event
MR / Minor-Ranking Event	means an event is/was a minor-ranking event

== Career finals ==
=== Amateur finals: 19 (9 titles) ===
Outcome	No.	Year	Championship	Opponent in the final	Score
Runner-up	1.	2020	English Under-16 Championship	(England) Paul Deaville	3–6
Runner-up	2.	2020	English Under-18 Championship	(England) Sean Maddocks	5–7
Runner-up	3.	2022	English Under-21 Championship	(England) Callum Beresford	2–8
Runner-up	4.	2023	EPSB Open Series - Crucible - Event 3	(India) Dharminder Singh Lilly	2–3
Winner	1.	2023	EPSB Open Series - Crucible - Event 4	(England) Wayne Townsend	3–2
Runner-up	5.	2023	English Under-18 Championship	(England) Liam Pullen	2–4
Winner	2.	2023	English Junior Tour - Event 1	(England) Jake Crofts	3–1
Winner	3.	2023	English Junior Tour - Event 2	(England) Aidan Murphy	3–0
Winner	4.	2023	EPSB Open Series - Woking - Event 1	(England) Labeeb Ahmed	3–1
Winner	5.	2023	English Junior Tour - Event 3	(England) Paul Deaville	3–1
Winner	6.	2024	English Junior Tour - Event 5	(England) Paul Deaville	3–0
Winner	7.	2024	EPSB Open Series - Woking - Event 5	(England) Peter Devlin	3–2
Winner	8.	2024	English Junior Tour - Event 1	(Moldova) Vladislav Gradinari	3–0
Runner-up	6.	2024	English Junior Tour - Event 3	(England) Ethan Llewellyn	1–3
Runner-up	7.	2025	EBSA European Under-21 Snooker Championship	(Ukraine) Iulian Boiko	4–5
Runner-up	8.	2025	English Under-21 Championship	(England) Liam Pullen	0–5
Runner-up	9.	2025	English Junior Tour - Event 2	(Moldova) Vladislav Gradinari	2–3
Winner	9.	2025	English Junior Tour - Event 4	(Moldova) Vladislav Gradinari	3–2
Runner-up	10.	2026	EBSA European Snooker Championship	(Ukraine) Anton Kazakov	4–5
