= Crucible curse =

Phrase used in professional snooker

The "Crucible curse" (also known as "The curse of the Crucible") is a quip in professional snooker, referring to the fact that no first-time winner of the World Snooker Championship has retained the title since the tournament moved to Sheffield's Crucible Theatre in 1977. Beginning with the 1979 champion Terry Griffiths, who lost in the second round of the 1980 event, 21 first-time world champions have failed to defend their titles, although Joe Johnson and Ken Doherty made it to the final the year after their maiden victories. Most recently, the 2025 champion Zhao Xintong lost in the quarter-finals of the 2026 World Snooker Championship. Wu Yize, first-time winner at the 2026 event, can attempt to break the Curse in the 2027 championship.

Several world champions successfully defended their first title in the pre-Crucible era; the last to do so was John Pulman in 1964.

== The curse ==
The first-time world champions listed below all experienced the "Crucible curse", as they did not successfully defend their title at the following year's World Championship.

Year	Defending champion	Progress	Result	Opponent	Ref
1980	Terry Griffiths (WAL)	Second round (Note: Griffiths, along with the other top 8 seeds, received a bye in the first round, thus the second round was his first match.)	10–13	Steve Davis (ENG)	
1981	Cliff Thorburn (CAN)	Semi-finals	10–16	Steve Davis (ENG)	
1982	Steve Davis (ENG)	First round	1–10	Tony Knowles (ENG)	
1986	Dennis Taylor (NIR)	First round	6–10	Mike Hallett (ENG)	
1987	Joe Johnson (ENG)	Final	14–18	Steve Davis (ENG)	
1991	Stephen Hendry (SCO)	Quarter-finals	11–13	Steve James (ENG)	
1992	John Parrott (ENG)	Quarter-finals	12–13	Alan McManus (SCO)	
1998	Ken Doherty (IRL)	Final	12–18	John Higgins (SCO)	
1999	John Higgins (SCO)	Semi-finals	10–17	Mark Williams (WAL)	
2001	Mark Williams (WAL)	Second round	12–13	Joe Swail (NIR)	
2002	Ronnie O'Sullivan (ENG)	Semi-finals	13–17	Stephen Hendry (SCO)	
2003	Peter Ebdon (ENG)	Quarter-finals	12–13	Paul Hunter (ENG)	
2006	Shaun Murphy (ENG)	Quarter-finals	7–13	Peter Ebdon (ENG)	
2007	Graeme Dott (SCO)	First round	7–10	Ian McCulloch (ENG)	
2011	Neil Robertson (AUS)	First round	8–10	Judd Trump (ENG)	
2015	Mark Selby (ENG)	Second round	9–13	Anthony McGill (SCO)	
2016	Stuart Bingham (ENG)	First round	9–10	Ali Carter (ENG)	
2020	Judd Trump (ENG)	Quarter-finals	9–13	Kyren Wilson (ENG)	
2024	Luca Brecel (BEL)	First round	9–10	David Gilbert (ENG)	
2025	Kyren Wilson (ENG)	First round	9–10	Lei Peifan (CHN)	
2026	Zhao Xintong (CHN)	Quarter-finals	10–13	Shaun Murphy (ENG)	

Of the 21 players to have won their first world title at the Crucible Theatre, eight lost in their first match as defending champion: Terry Griffiths in 1980, Steve Davis in 1982, Dennis Taylor in 1986, Graeme Dott in 2007, Neil Robertson in 2011, Stuart Bingham in 2016, Luca Brecel in 2024 and Kyren Wilson in 2025. Only two of the 21 were able to reach the final as defending champions: Joe Johnson in 1987 and Ken Doherty in 1998. Johnson came closest to breaking the curse, getting within four frames of retaining his crown, while Doherty came within six.

Four players have won consecutive world titles at the Crucible (having already won the championship previously): Steve Davis (1983–1984 and 1987–1989), Stephen Hendry (1992–1996), Ronnie O'Sullivan (2012–2013), and Mark Selby (2016–2017).

== Pre-Crucible ==
Out of all the first-time world snooker champions, only three retained their title at the next World Championship: Joe Davis in 1928, his brother Fred Davis in 1949, and John Pulman at his first challenge match in 1964. No player in the modern era (post-1969) has successfully defended a first world title, even before the tournament was staged at the Crucible Theatre.

John Spencer, Ray Reardon and Alex Higgins won the World Championship for the first time before the event was moved to the Crucible in 1977, and failed to retain the title the following year (although this could not be attributed to the "Crucible curse"). All three players subsequently won the championship at the Crucible for the first time, but then fell to the "curse" when they failed to successfully defend the title the following year.

Year	Defending champion	Progress	Result	Opponent	Ref
Defending first world title:
1970	John Spencer (ENG)	Semi-finals	33–37	Ray Reardon (WAL)	
1971	Ray Reardon (WAL)	Semi-finals	15–34	John Spencer (ENG)	
1973	Alex Higgins (NIR)	Semi-finals	9–23	Eddie Charlton (AUS)	
Defending first world title at Crucible Theatre:
1978	John Spencer (ENG)	Last 16	8–13	Perrie Mans (RSA)	
1979	Ray Reardon (WAL)	Quarter-finals	8–13	Dennis Taylor (NIR)	
1983	Alex Higgins (NIR)	Semi-finals	5–16	Steve Davis (ENG)	
