= 2026 World Snooker Championship =

Professional snooker tournament

2026 Halo World Snooker Championship
- Promotional poster for the championship

Tournament information
- Dates: 18 April – 4 May 2026
- Venue: Crucible Theatre
- City: Sheffield
- Country: England
- Organisation: World Snooker Tour
- Format: Ranking event
- Total prize fund: £2,395,000
- Winner's share: £500,000
- Highest break: Chang Bingyu (CHN) (147)

Final
- Champion: Wu Yize (CHN)
- Runner-up: Shaun Murphy (ENG)
- Score: 18–17

The 2026 World Snooker Championship (officially the 2026 Halo World Snooker Championship) was a professional snooker tournament that took place from 18 April to 4 May 2026 at the Crucible Theatre in Sheffield, England, the 50th consecutive year that the World Snooker Championship was staged at the venue. Qualifying took place from 6 to 15 April at the English Institute of Sport in Sheffield. The 18th and final ranking event of the 2025–26 snooker season, the tournament was broadcast domestically by BBC Sport, in Europe by Eurosport, and globally by other broadcasters. The winner received £500,000 from a total prize fund of £2,395,000.

The main stage featured 32 players, including a record 11 participants from mainland China. He Guoqiang, Antoni Kowalski, Stan Moody, and Liam Pullen made their Crucible debuts. Zhao Xintong was the defending champion, having defeated Mark Williams 18–12 in the 2025 final, but he lost 10–13 to Shaun Murphy in the quarter-finals, becoming the 21st player to experience the so-called Crucible curse. The 14th frame of the semi-final match between Wu Yize and Mark Allen lasted 100 minutes and 21 seconds, a new record for the longest frame played at the Crucible. After Allen missed a match-ball black off its spot in the penultimate frame, Wu prevailed to win 17–16. Wu went on to defeat Murphy 18–17 in the final, becoming the second World Champion from Asia, following Zhao, and the tournament's second-youngest winner, behind only Stephen Hendry.

The event produced a record 258 century breaks, including a record 177 in qualifying, of which the highest was a maximum break by Chang Bingyu in the third qualifying round. It was the 24th maximum of the season, a new record. The main stage featured 81 centuries, of which the highest was a 145 by Allen in the semi-finals. Ken Doherty, the 1997 World Champion, retired from professional competition after the tournament.

== Background ==
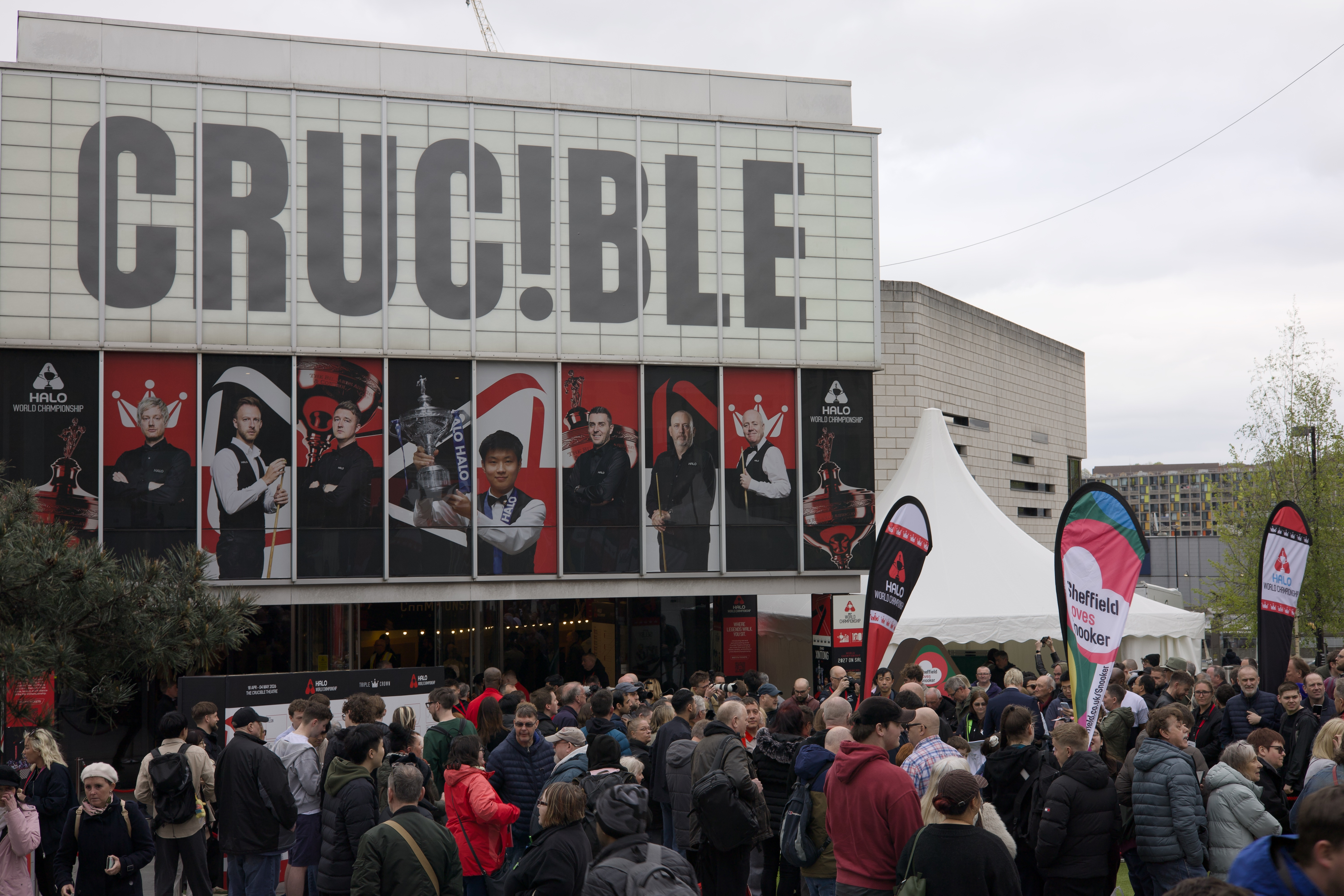
For the 50th consecutive year, the main stage of the tournament was held at the Crucible Theatre (pictured during the event) in Sheffield, England.

The inaugural 1927 World Snooker Championship, then known as the Professional Championship of Snooker, took place at various venues in England between November 1926 and May 1927. Joe Davis won the final, held at Camkin's Hall in Birmingham from 9 to 12 May 1927, and went on to win all of the first 15 stagings of the tournament before retiring undefeated after the 1946 edition (no tournaments were held from 1941 to 1945 because of World War II). The tournament went into abeyance after only two players contested the 1952 edition, due to a dispute between the Professional Billiards Players' Association (PBPA) and the Billiards Association and Control Council (BACC). The PBPA established an alternative tournament, the World Professional Match-play Championship, of which the six editions held between 1952 and 1957 are retroactively regarded as legitimate continuations of the World Snooker Championship. However, due to waning public interest in snooker during the post-war era, that tournament was also discontinued, and the world title was uncontested between 1958 and 1963.

Professional player Rex Williams was instrumental in reviving the World Snooker Championship on a challenge basis in 1964. John Pulman, winner of the 1957 World Professional Match-play Championship, defended the world title across seven challenge matches between 1964 and 1968. The World Snooker Championship reverted to an annual knockout tournament for the 1969 edition, which marked the beginning of the championship's "modern era". The 1977 edition was the first staged at the Crucible Theatre in Sheffield, where it has remained since. As of 2026, the most successful players in the modern era were Stephen Hendry and Ronnie O'Sullivan, each having won the title seven times. Hendry was the tournament's youngest winner, having captured his first title at the 1990 event, aged 21 years and 106 days. O'Sullivan was the oldest winner, having won his seventh title at the 2022 event, aged 46 years and 148 days. O'Sullivan, who made his 33rd consecutive appearance at the 2025 event, had featured at the Crucible more times than any other player.

== Overview ==
The 2026 edition of the tournament—the 58th successive year that the World Snooker Championship was contested through the modern knockout format—took place from 18 April to 4 May at the Crucible Theatre in Sheffield, England, the 50th consecutive year that the World Championship was staged at the venue. Organised by the World Snooker Tour and sponsored for the second time by technology company Halo Service Solutions, the tournament was the 18th and final ranking event of the 2025–26 snooker season, following the 2026 Tour Championship. It was the third and final Triple Crown event of the season, following the 2025 UK Championship and the 2026 Masters. The defending champion was Zhao Xintong, who had defeated Mark Williams 18–12 in the 2025 final to win his first world title. Zhao was the 21st player to face the so-called "Crucible curse", referring to the fact that no first-time champion had retained the title since the tournament moved to the Crucible in 1977.

=== Format ===
The top 16 players in the snooker world rankings, as they stood after the 2026 Tour Championship, were seeded through to the main stage at the Crucible Theatre. A further 16 players earned places at the Crucible through a qualifying competition that took place from 6 to 15 April at the English Institute of Sport in Sheffield, featuring 128 players, including professionals outside the top 16 in the rankings and 16 amateurs selected by the World Professional Billiards and Snooker Association on the basis of their performances at recognised international events that season. Professional players who did not enter the event were replaced by amateur players from the 2025 Q School Order of Merit. The qualifiers took place over four rounds, with players ranked 49 to 80 seeded through to the second qualifying round and players ranked 17 to 48 seeded through to the third qualifying round. All qualifying matches were played as the best of 19 frames, held over two sessions.

The first-round draw, during which the 16 successful qualifiers were drawn at random against the top 16 seeds, took place on 16 April, broadcast on BBC Radio 5 Live and the BBC Sport website. First-round matches were played as the best of 19 frames, held over two sessions. Second-round and quarter-final matches were played as the best of 25 frames, held over three sessions. The semi-final matches were played as the best of 33 frames, held over four sessions. The final was the best of 35 frames, also held over four sessions.

=== Broadcasters ===
The qualifying rounds were broadcast by Discovery+ in Germany, Italy, and Austria; by HBO Max in the United Kingdom and other European, North African, and Middle Eastern territories; by Huya, Migu, the CBSA-WPBSA Academy WeChat Channel, and CBSA-WPBSA Academy Douyin in mainland China; and by WST Play in all other territories. The final round of qualifying, billed as "Judgement Day", was broadcast for free on WST Play and YouTube on 14 and 15 April.

The main stage of the tournament was broadcast by BBC Sport, TNT Sports, and HBO Max in the United Kingdom and Ireland. It was broadcast by Eurosport in mainland Europe; by Discovery+ in Germany, Italy, and Austria; and by HBO Max in other European, North African, and Middle Eastern territories. It was broadcast in mainland China by the same broadcasters as the qualifying rounds. It was broadcast by Now TV in Hong Kong; by Astro SuperSport in Malaysia and Brunei; by TrueVisions in Thailand; by VTVCab in Vietnam; by Sportcast in Taiwan; by TAP Sports in the Philippines; by Sportstars/Vision+ in Indonesia; by N Sports in Mongolia; by Sky Sport in New Zealand; and by WST Play in all other territories.

=== Prize fund ===
The winner of the event received £500,000 from a total prize fund of £2,395,000. The breakdown of prize money is shown below:

- Winner: £500,000
- Runner-up: £200,000
- Semi-finalists: £100,000
- Quarter-finalists: £50,000
- Last 16: £30,000
- Last 32: £20,000
- Last 48: £15,000
- Last 80: £10,000
- Last 112: £5,000
- Highest break (qualifying stage included): £15,000
- Total: £2,395,000

In addition to the highest break prize, bonuses of £40,000 and £10,000 were offered for maximum breaks made at the main stage and in the qualifying rounds respectively. That season, the first three players who made two maximums across the season's Triple Crown events and the Saudi Arabia Snooker Masters would win a bonus of £147,000. Before the tournament's main stage, the bonus had been won twice: O'Sullivan won it by making two maximums at the 2025 Saudi Arabia Snooker Masters and Chang Bingyu won it by making maximums in the 2025 UK Championship qualifiers and the World Championship qualifiers. As the main stage began, eligibility was extended so that the bonus could be won three further times.

== Summary ==
=== Qualifying rounds ===
==== First qualifying round ====
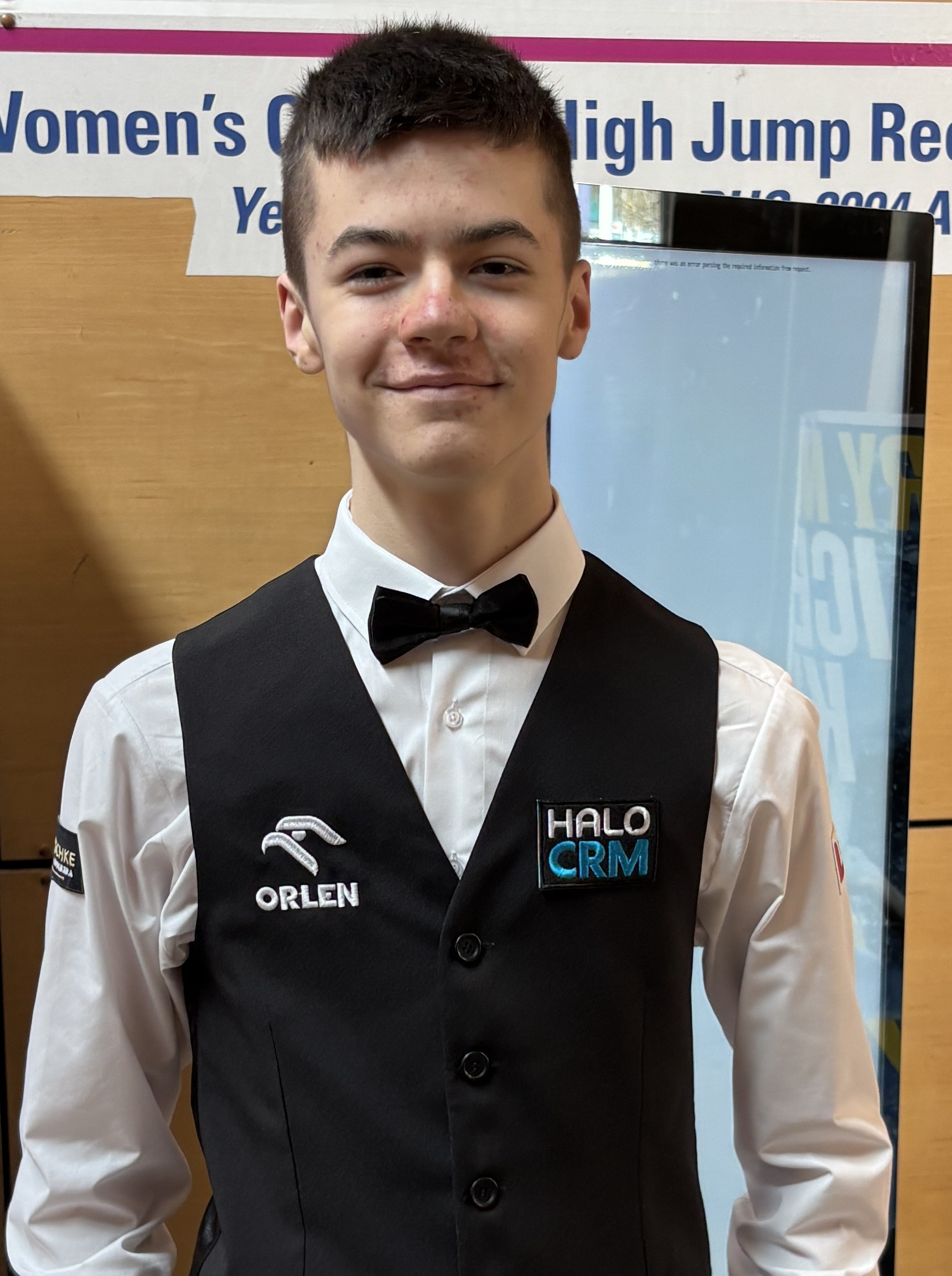
Michał Szubarczyk (pictured at the event) became the youngest player to win a World Championship match, aged 15 years and 84 days.

The first qualifying round featured players ranked 81 to 112 against players seeded 113 to 144, including selected amateurs. At the age of 15 years and 84 days, Michał Szubarczyk defeated Ng On-yee 10–7 to become the youngest player to win a World Championship match, surpassing Liam Davies, who had been 15 years and 277 days old when he achieved the feat at the 2022 edition. Veteran player Jimmy White, aged 63, played in his 46th World Championship campaign, having last reached the Crucible at the 2006 edition. He led Gao Yang 5–1, but Gao recovered to win the deciding frame on the colours. The reigning World Women's Champion Bai Yulu made a century break of 101 as she defeated amateur player Daniel Womersley 10–7. She became the first female player to win a World Championship qualifying match since Reanne Evans defeated Robin Hull at the 2017 edition.

Amateur player Patrick Whelan won five of the last six frames to secure a 10–5 victory over Ken Doherty, winner of the 1997 edition. Liam Pullen trailed amateur player Alfie Burden 1–5 but recovered to force a deciding frame, which he won on the last blue. Marco Fu produced three centuries as he defeated Mink Nutcharut 10–1. Lan Yuhao, aged 17, made three centuries and seven other breaks over 50 during his 10–5 victory over Chatchapong Nasa. Jamie Clarke made his highest break in professional competition, a 138, in his 10–5 win over Haydon Pinhey. Farakh Ajaib, Cheung Ka Wai, Doherty, Kreishh Gurbaxani, Huang Jiahao, Jonas Luz, Mitchell Mann, Mink Nutcharut, Pinhey, Haris Tahir, and Hatem Yassen all lost their professional tour cards after their first-round defeats. Doherty subsequently announced his retirement from professional snooker at age 56, having played for 36 years on the main tour.

==== Second qualifying round ====
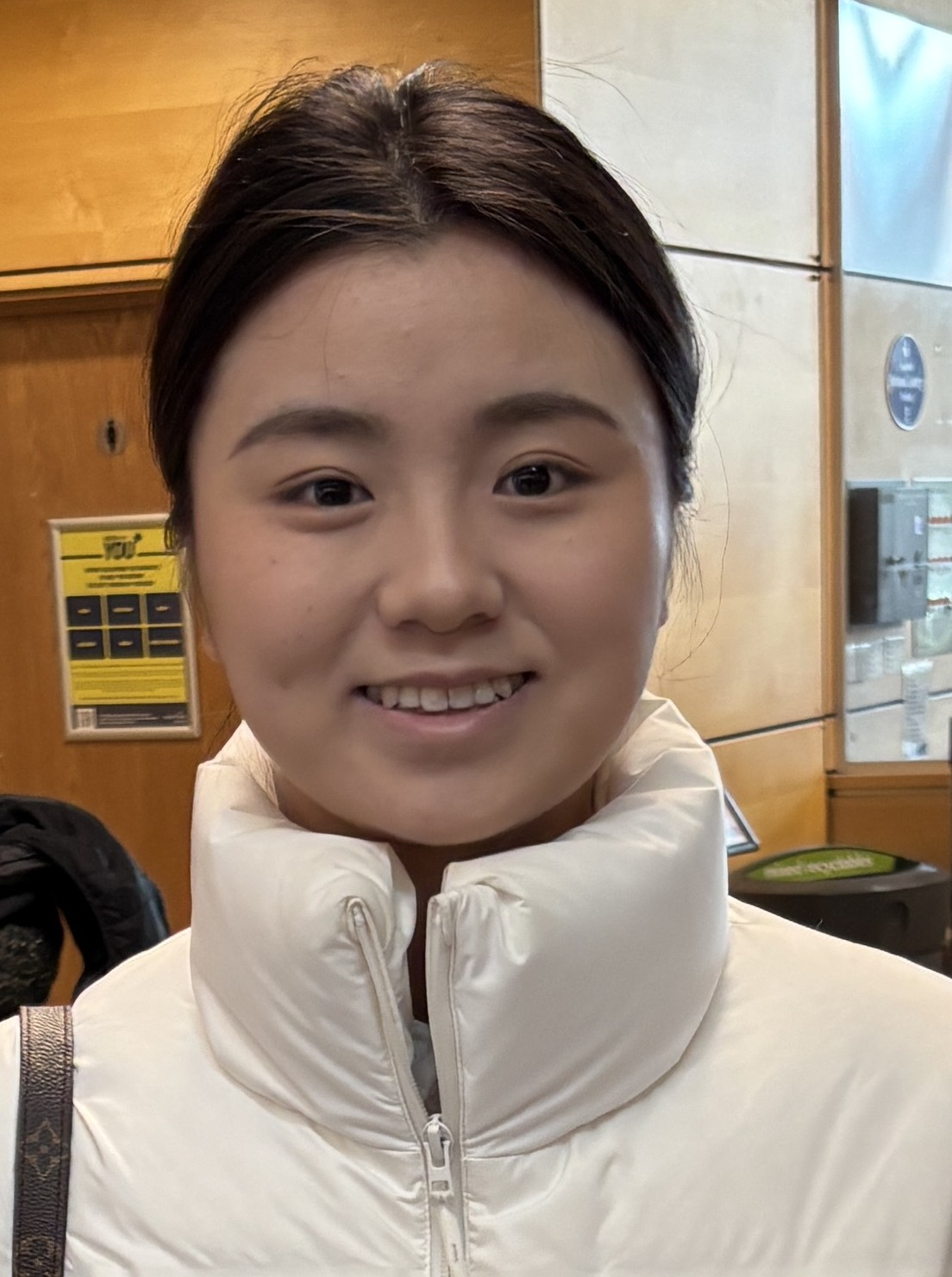
Bai Yulu (pictured at the event) was the first woman to make multiple century breaks in World Championship qualifying.

The second qualifying round featured the winners of the first qualifying round against players ranked 49 to 80. Bai lost 4–10 to Michael Holt but made her second century of the tournament, a 108, becoming the first woman to make multiple centuries in a World Championship qualifying campaign. Szubarczyk defeated Sanderson Lam 10–8, and another Polish player, Antoni Kowalski, advanced with a 10–1 victory over Connor Benzey. Amateur player Wang Xinbo made a 143 break as he defeated Iulian Boiko 10–4. Robert Milkins, aged 50, who had played on the professional tour continuously since 1995, lost his tour card after his 3–10 defeat by Whelan. Mark Davis, aged 53, a professional since 1991, also lost his tour card after his 6–10 defeat by Gao. Oliver Sykes, who had secured a professional tour card for the following season as runner-up at the EBSA European Snooker Championship, made the 40th 146 break in the history of professional snooker during his 10–8 win over Lyu Haotian. Clarke lost the first five frames of his match against Ben Mertens and then withdrew due to illness.

Sam Craigie forfeited the fifth frame of his match against amateur player Umut Dikme after he returned late from the mid-session interval, and Dikme went on to win in a deciding frame. Fu won five consecutive frames to lead Liam Davies 9–5. Davies took four in a row to tie the scores at 9–9, but Fu clinched the decider. Jordan Brown defeated Ian Burns on the final black of a deciding frame. Chang Bingyu made three centuries as he beat Prin Ratmukda 10–2, and Ishpreet Singh Chadha advanced with a 10–5 win over Chris Totten. In addition to Milkins and Davis, players who lost their tour cards after their second-round defeats were Bai, Davies, Gong Chenzhi, Duane Jones, Lam, Totten, Amir Sarkhosh, and Wang Yuchen.

==== Third qualifying round ====
The third qualifying round featured the winners of the second qualifying round against players ranked 17 to 48. Hossein Vafaei won all nine frames in the opening session of his match against Szubarczyk; he attempted a maximum break in the seventh frame but missed the green. Vafaei went on to secure a 10–2 victory. Stuart Bingham, winner of the 2015 edition, made nine breaks over 50 as he won all nine frames in his first session against Wang Xinbo; he also went on to complete a 10–2 win. Aaron Hill made back-to-back centuries of 133 and 137 in his 10–3 victory over Yao Pengcheng. Pullen defeated the recent 2026 World Open winner Thepchaiya Un-Nooh 10–7. Stan Moody made a highest break of 128 as he beat Robbie Williams 10–5, and Jamie Jones ensured that he would remain on the professional tour with a 10–3 win over Matthew Selt. Kowalski advanced with a 10–8 win over Joe O'Connor. Liam Highfield produced back-to-back century breaks in his 10–5 win over Stephen Maguire, who failed to qualify for the main stage for the third time in four years.

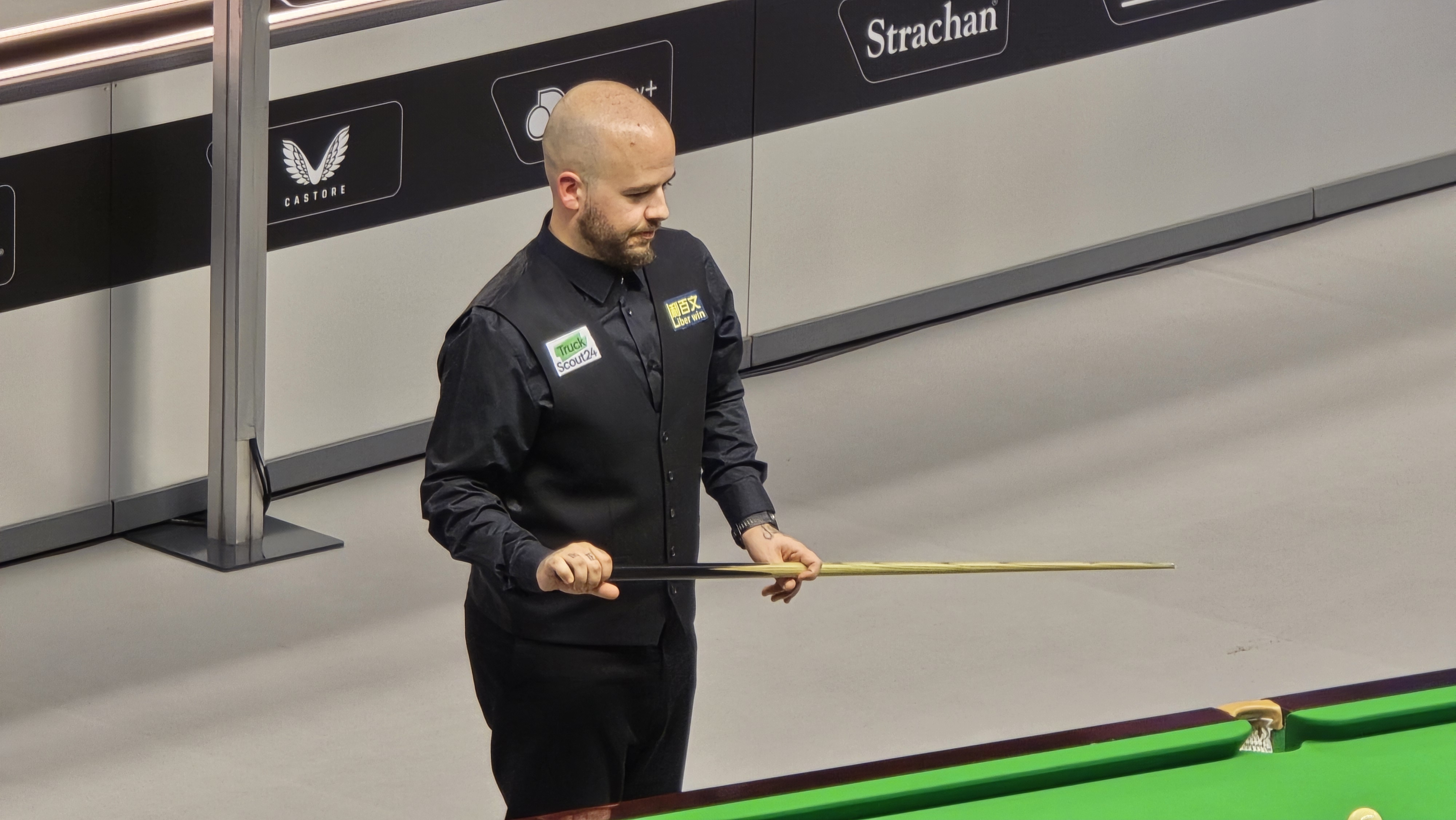
The 2023 champion Luca Brecel (pictured in 2025) defeated Chang Bingyu, who made a maximum break in the match. Brecel lost in the fourth qualifying round.

Chang made the second maximum break of his professional career in the ninth frame of his match against Luca Brecel. It was the record-extending 24th maximum of the 2025–26 season and the 241st official maximum in snooker history. Having made a maximum in the 2025 UK Championship qualifying rounds, Chang won a £147,000 bonus for making two maximums across the season's Triple Crown events and the Saudi Arabia Snooker Masters. He also won the £15,000 highest break prize and a £10,000 bonus for making a maximum in the qualifiers. Chang made three centuries in the first session, ending it 5–4 ahead, but Brecel produced breaks of 51, 70, 81, 120, 63, and 52 in the second session as he won the match 10–8. Brecel's century in the 15th frame was his first in professional competition that season.

Jak Jones, runner-up at the 2024 edition, made centuries of 119 and 135 and six other half-centuries as he defeated Fu 10–6. Ali Carter won eight consecutive frames, making a highest break of 142, as he defeated Julien Leclercq 10–5. He Guoqiang defeated Long Zehuang 10–8. Mertens beat Yuan Sijun in the deciding frame of a match that produced three century breaks by each player, while Fan Zhengyi advanced by defeating Jimmy Robertson 10–4. Anthony McGill trailed Martin O'Donnell 2–8 and 4–9, and required a snooker in frame 14 while trailing by 69 points. However, McGill won six consecutive frames for a 10–9 victory. Robbie McGuigan, Bulcsú Révész, and Allan Taylor lost their tour cards after their third-round defeats.

==== Fourth qualifying round ====
The fourth qualifying round, billed as "Judgement Day", featured all 32 winners from the third qualifying round. In the first session of his match against Noppon Saengkham, Pullen attempted a maximum break—for which he would have won a £147,000 bonus, having already made a maximum in the 2025 UK Championship qualifiers—but he missed the 14th black. Pullen won the match 10–8, securing his Crucible debut. The match between Moody and Jiang Jun went to a deciding frame, which Moody won with a century of 104, becoming the first British teenager to reach the Crucible since Judd Trump at the 2007 edition. Moody was suffering from tonsillitis but discharged himself from hospital to play the match. "The doctors said to me, 'We know you are going to say no but we want you to stay in.' I said 'No, I've got a match to play.' And I'm glad I did," Moody commented afterwards.

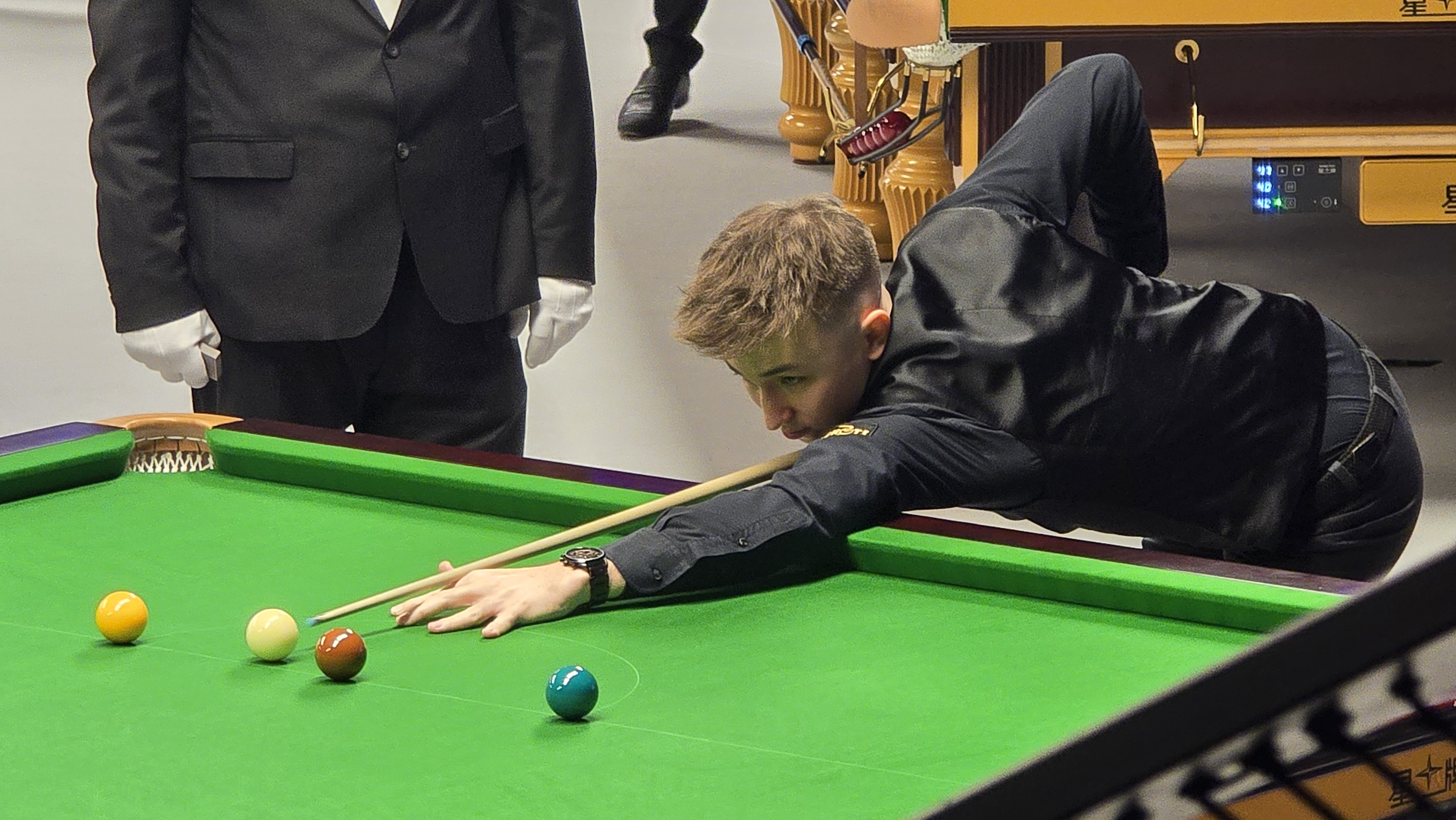
Antoni Kowalski (pictured in 2025) was the first Polish player to reach the Crucible. The other Crucible debutants were He Guoqiang, Stan Moody, and Liam Pullen.

Facing Jamie Jones, Kowalski won four frames in a row to lead 9–6 and went on to secure a 10–8 victory, becoming the first Polish player to reach the main stage at the Crucible. His win ensured that he would remain on the professional tour the following season. In tears after the match, Kowalski said: "I never cry, so that's the perfect explanation of what it means to me." Pang Junxu defeated Jackson Page by the same score, and Zhou Yuelong advanced with a 10–4 win over Holt. Two-time finalist Matthew Stevens led Bingham 5–4 after the first session and went on to win the match 10–7, reaching the Crucible for the first time since the 2022 edition. From 1–4 behind against Gao, Vafaei won nine frames in a row for a 10–4 victory, reaching the Crucible for a fifth consecutive time. Two-time semi-finalist David Gilbert produced breaks of 141 and 126 as he took a 5–4 lead over Hill in the first session. Gilbert went on to win 10–6, the second consecutive year he had beaten Hill in the final qualifying round.

Jak Jones made five centuries of 136, 100, 114, 114, and 132 as he defeated Brecel 10–5, afterwards calling the match "the best I have played all season". He Guoqiang won the first five frames against the world number 18 Jack Lisowski and went on to complete a 10–5 victory, securing his Crucible debut. Carter came from 5–7 behind against McGill to win five consecutive frames for a 10–7 victory, reaching the Crucible for the 22nd time. Zhang Anda made five centuries of 109, 105, 134, 108, and 143 and four other breaks over 60 as he defeated Zak Surety 10–3, reaching the Crucible for a sixth time. Highfield made a highest break of 126 as he beat Oliver Lines 10–2; Fan made three centuries of 104, 119, and 100 in his 10–4 win over Mertens; and Lei Peifan advanced with a 10–5 defeat of Ryan Day. Xu Si came from 2–7 and 4–8 behind to lead Gary Wilson 9–8. Wilson trailed by 44 points in frame 18 but recovered to force a decider, which he won with a century of 126. A total of six players from mainland China qualified for the Crucible, in addition to five seeds. The total of 11 players from mainland China at the main stage set a new record, surpassing the 10 at the previous year's tournament. The qualifying rounds produced a record total of 177 century breaks, surpassing the 143 set during the previous year's qualifiers.

=== Main stage ===
==== First round ====
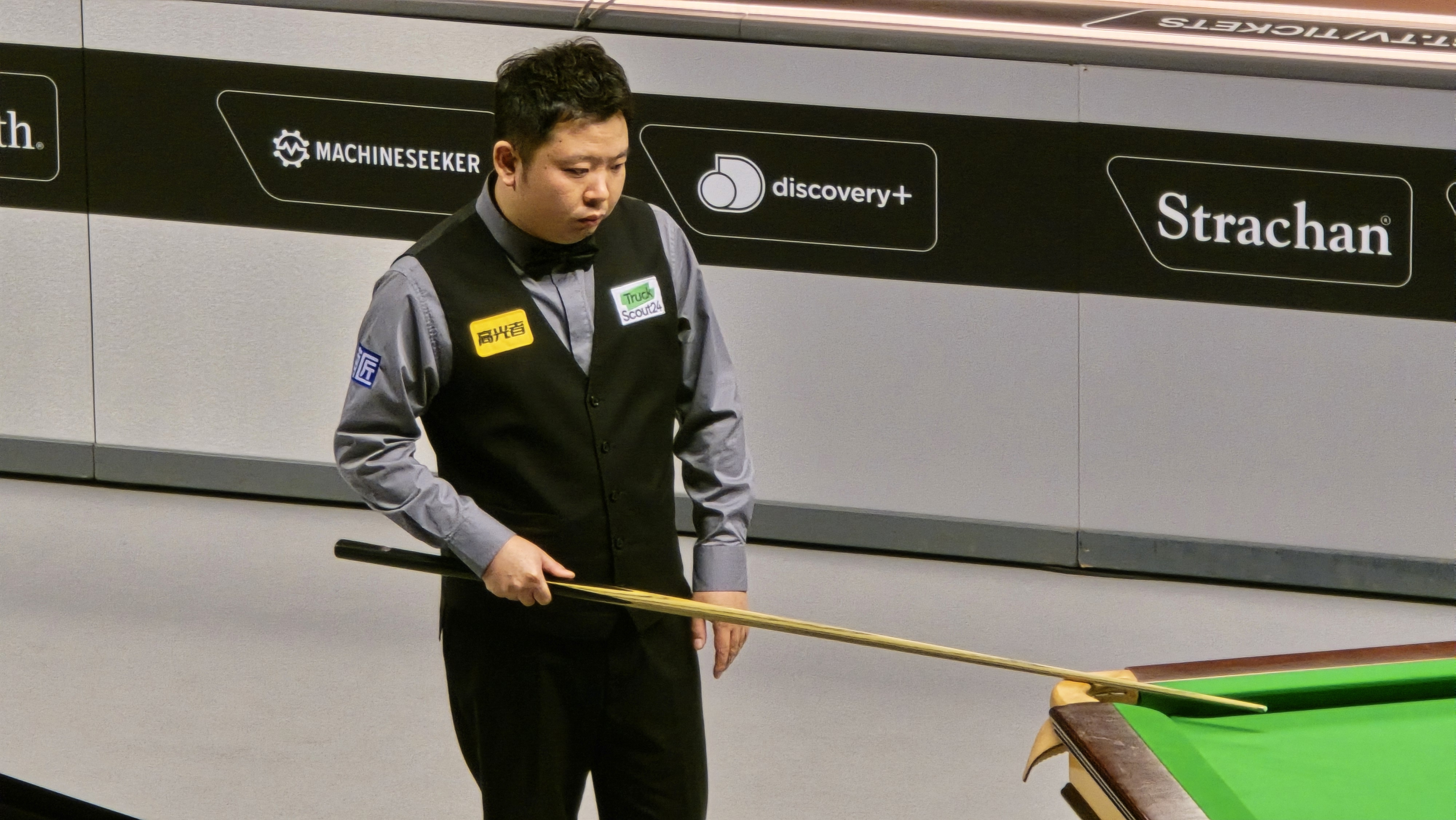
Zhang Anda (pictured in 2025) was one of a record 11 players from mainland China in the last 32. His 6–10 defeat to Mark Allen meant he had lost in the first round on all six of his Crucible appearances.

The first-round matches were played from 18 to 23 April as the best of 19 frames, held over two sessions. Before the opening session at the Crucible, players and broadcasters led the audience in a minute's applause to commemorate former professional player and commentator John Virgo, who had died in February at age 79. Facing Highfield, the defending champion Zhao Xintong led 5–4 after the first session and went on to complete a 10–7 win, having made three centuries in the match, 123, 128, and 112. "I didn't play that well," Zhao commented afterwards, saying he was under "big pressure" in trying to defend the title. Zhang made centuries of 129 and 109 and further breaks of 75, 58, and 72 as he took a 5–3 lead over Mark Allen in the opening session, which ended a frame early due to time constraints. Allen called his play "absolutely embarrassing" after failing to make a break over 50 in the first session, but he produced breaks including 140, 109, 129, and 81 in the second session as he won six consecutive frames for a 10–6 victory. Zhang's defeat meant that he had lost in the first round on all six of his Crucible appearances. "It will be a disappointing career for me if I look back and I haven't won [the world title]," said Allen after the match. Xiao Guodong led Zhou 5–4 after the opening session. In the second session, Xiao won three frames in a row, including back-to-back centuries of 115 and 128, as he completed a 10–6 victory. "It was very difficult as [Zhou] Yuelong is like a little brother to me," Xiao said afterwards. "We train together and it is hard to beat friends."

The three-time champion Mark Williams faced debutant Kowalski. The scores were tied at 3–3 after the first six frames, but Williams then won three consecutive frames for a 6–3 lead. In the second session, Williams took four frames in a row to secure a 10–4 victory. Williams praised his opponent afterwards, calling him a "cracking potter" and "definitely one to watch out for". Kowalski said he was proud to have been the first player to represent Poland at the Crucible but commented that he "ran out of steam" after his efforts in the qualifying rounds. Facing Stevens, Barry Hawkins won six consecutive frames to end the first session 7–2 ahead and went on to win the match 10–4, his first victory at the Crucible since the 2021 event. Both players criticised the cushions after the match. Stevens said that they had "spoiled the game," while Hawkins compared the conditions to a ping-pong table. Ding Junhui, runner-up at the 2016 edition, made his 20th consecutive Crucible appearance. He led Gilbert 7–2 after the first session and went on to complete a 10–5 victory.

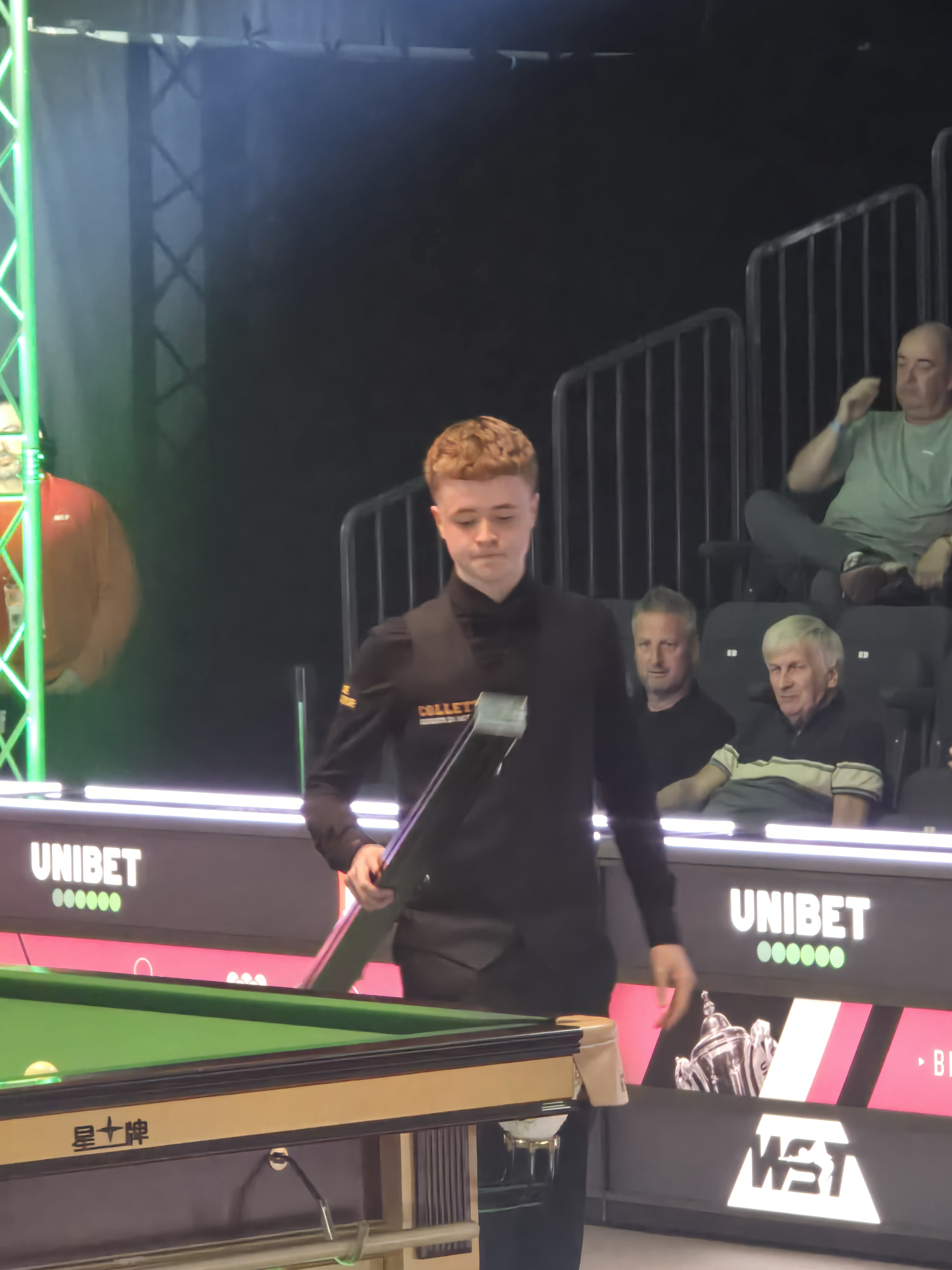
Crucible debutant Stan Moody (pictured in 2025) was the first British teenager to play at the main stage since Judd Trump in 2007. Moody led Kyren Wilson 7–3 but lost the match 7–10.

The four-time champion John Higgins won the first four frames against Carter, who responded by winning five in a row to lead 5–4 after the first session. Higgins won three of the last four frames in the second session to secure a 10–7 victory. It was the 12th consecutive year Higgins had won his first-round match at the Crucible, the longest streak of any player. "When the draw came out, I wasn't happy because I knew it would be a mammoth game," said Higgins afterwards, calling Carter "one of the biggest battlers" in the sport. Kyren Wilson, winner of the 2024 edition, faced debutant Moody, who made breaks of 84, 91, 110, 55, and 101 in the first session as he took a 6–3 lead. Moody won the first frame of the second session to go 7–3 ahead and had a 35-point lead in frame 11 when he missed frame ball, the last red, along the top cushion. Wilson won the frame on a re-spotted black and went on to take seven consecutive frames, winning frame 14 after requiring three snookers on the last red. "It was really tough," said Wilson after securing a 10–7 win. "I wasn't playing great but I made some dogged clearances and I had to keep doing the right things." Wu Yize, who had lost in the first round on his previous two Crucible appearances, produced breaks including 93, 92, 85, 67, 58, and 105 as he took an 8–1 lead over Lei. In the second session, Wu made breaks of 68 and 116 to complete a 10–2 victory, his first win at the Crucible. "It is my dream to win it," said Wu. "I don't know if I can do that, but I will give 100 per cent and enjoy each match."

Shaun Murphy, winner of the 2005 edition, led Fan 3–1 at the mid-session interval, but Fan tied the scores at 3–3, winning the sixth frame on a re-spotted black. The scores were tied again at 4–4, but Murphy won the last of the session with a 140 total clearance for a 5–4 advantage. In the second session, Murphy led 6–5 but required two snookers on the last red in frame 12. He secured the penalty points he needed to force the second re-spotted black of the match, but Fan successfully doubled the black to level at 6–6. The players shared the next six frames, taking the match to a deciding frame. Fan had a 36-point lead in the decider when he missed a red, and Murphy produced a match-winning break of 50 that he later called "the best break I have ever made," saying: "I can't believe I won the match from that position, the way the balls were." Judd Trump, the world number one and winner of the 2019 edition, faced Gary Wilson, who made a century of 139 as he moved into a 4–1 lead. Trump won frame six, took frame seven on the colours after requiring a snooker, and then produced breaks of 128 and 77 as he added the last two of the session for a 5–4 lead. Wilson took the first frame of the second session, but Trump then won five consecutive frames for a 10–5 victory. "When it got to 8–5, I could sense a little bit of his confidence was draining and he was going for some rash shots. I knew for me it was then the time to step up," Trump said afterwards.

The seven-time champion Ronnie O'Sullivan made a record-extending 34th Crucible appearance as he faced debutant He Guoqiang. O'Sullivan won the first five frames and ended the first session 7–2 ahead. In the second session, he made back-to-back centuries of 113 and 100 as he completed a 10–2 victory. "I still feel a bit rusty," commented O'Sullivan, who had featured in just nine other tournaments that season. "I haven't played against top players regularly so it's hard to know what my chances are." Chris Wakelin, competing as a seeded player in the tournament for the first time, took a 5–4 lead over debutant Pullen, his friend and practice partner. In the second session, Wakelin won four frames in a row and went on to secure a 10–6 victory. "I love to win, but I am not putting any pressure or expectation on myself," Wakelin said afterwards.

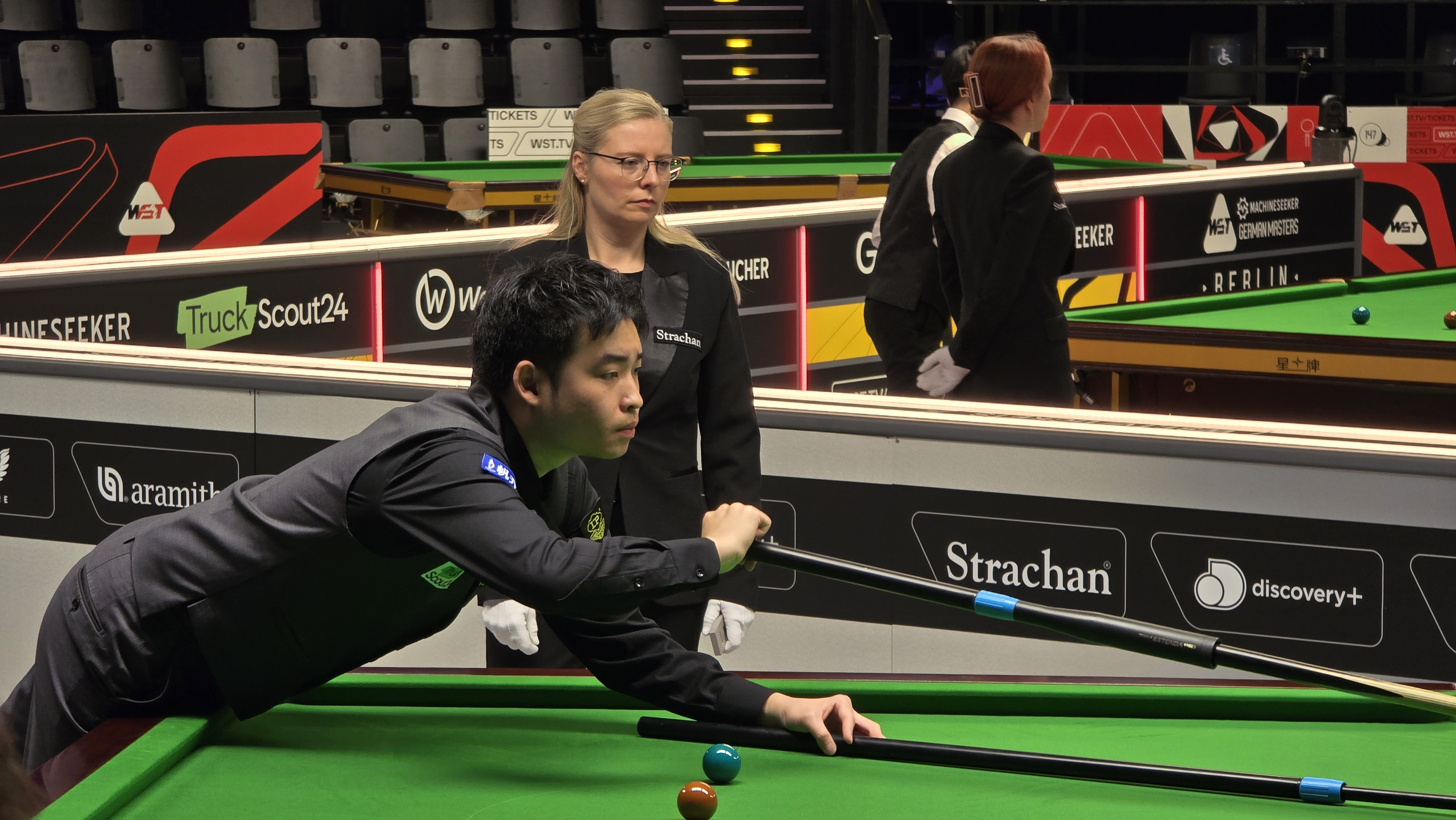
Si Jiahui (pictured in 2025) was the only seeded player eliminated in the first round, losing 3–10 to Hossein Vafaei. It was the third time, following the 1983 and 1993 events, that 15 of the 16 seeds advanced.

The four-time champion Mark Selby won the first six frames against Jak Jones, the 2024 runner-up, and ended the first session 7–2 ahead. He went on to complete a 10–2 win, his first victory at the Crucible since the 2023 edition. "It's very tough when you lose in round one because this only comes around once a year," Selby said afterwards, adding that he had been happy with his form in the second half of the season. Facing Si Jiahui, Vafaei came from 1–3 behind to win nine consecutive frames for a 10–3 victory. "Perhaps I was sharp after the qualifiers," Vafaei said afterwards. "This gives me confidence and I will be ready for my next match." Neil Robertson took a 5–4 lead over Pang in the first session, despite conceding the second frame while only 47 points behind with 51 remaining on the table, mistakenly believing he was 57 behind. In the second session, Pang tied the scores at 5–5, but Robertson won five of the last six frames for a 10–6 victory. A record-equalling 15 of the 16 seeds reached the second round, with Si the only seed to lose his first-round match. This had previously happened only twice, at the 1983 and 1993 editions, when Jimmy White and Alain Robidoux respectively were the only seeds who did not advance.

==== Second round ====
The second-round matches were played from 23 to 27 April as the best of 25 frames, held over three sessions. Murphy made four centuries as he defeated Xiao 13–3, winning the match with a session to spare and reaching his 10th World Championship quarter-final. "I was handed a lifeline when I beat Fan and I don't want to waste it," Murphy said afterwards. "I know that my opportunities here won't come forever and when they do arrive I have to snatch them." Allen won the first five frames against the world number two Kyren Wilson, who responded to take the last three of the session. Wilson also won the first three frames of the second session to lead 6–5, by which point Allen had potted just 10 balls since taking a 5–0 lead. However, Allen won four of the last five frames in the session, making a total clearance of 140 in frame 15, to end it 9–7 ahead. In the third session, Allen won four of the six frames played for a 13–9 victory, reaching his fifth World Championship quarter-final. "I'd love to score a little bit better," Allen said afterwards. "It isn't a lot of fun grinding matches out."

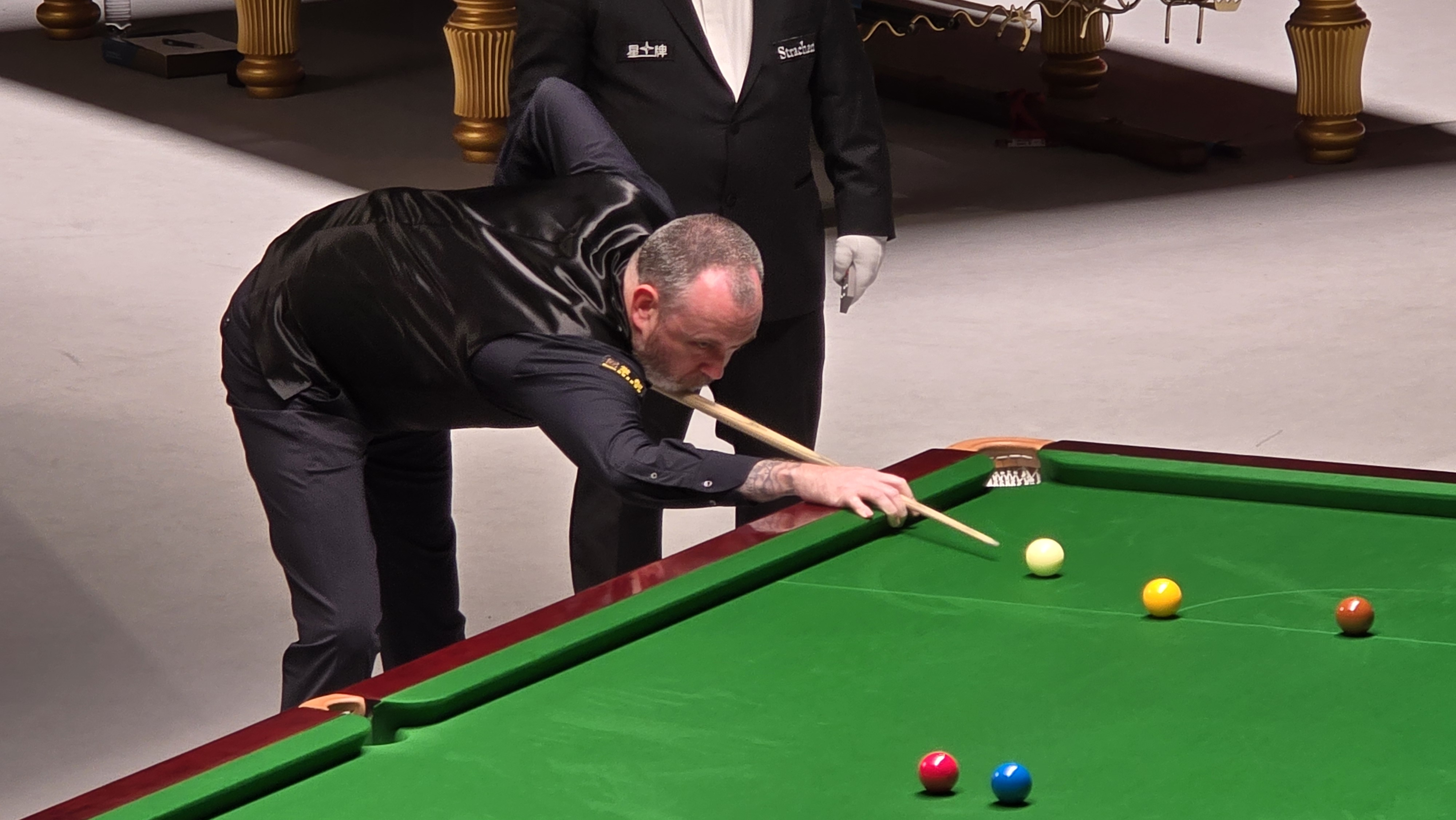
The three-time champion and previous year's runner-up Mark Williams (pictured in 2026) lost 9–13 to Barry Hawkins.

Ding faced the defending champion Zhao in a match that was expected to reach large audiences in China. The scores were tied at 4–4 after the opening session. In the second session, Zhao won four of the first five frames as he moved 8–5 ahead, but Ding took two of the last three to leave Zhao leading 9–7. Zhao won four of the six frames played in the third session as he completed a 13–9 victory. "Before the match I said I just wanted to enjoy it and not put myself under pressure," Zhao said afterwards. "It wasn't like that. We knew everyone had their eyes on us. I couldn't enjoy it." Williams and Hawkins were tied at 4–4 after their first session, Hawkins having made a century of 127 in the opening frame and Williams a century of 124 in frame four. In the second session, Hawkins won five of the first six frames played and ended the session 10–6 ahead. The final session of the match coincided with the first session between O'Sullivan and Higgins on the other table, meaning that all three members of the Class of '92 were competing at the Crucible simultaneously. The players received a standing ovation, which Williams called "the best reception I've ever seen here." Hawkins went on to complete a 13–9 victory, reaching the seventh World Championship quarter-final of his career and his first since the 2018 edition. "I used to crumble against those sorts of players," Hawkins said afterwards. "I think in the last four or five years I've had more belief in myself."

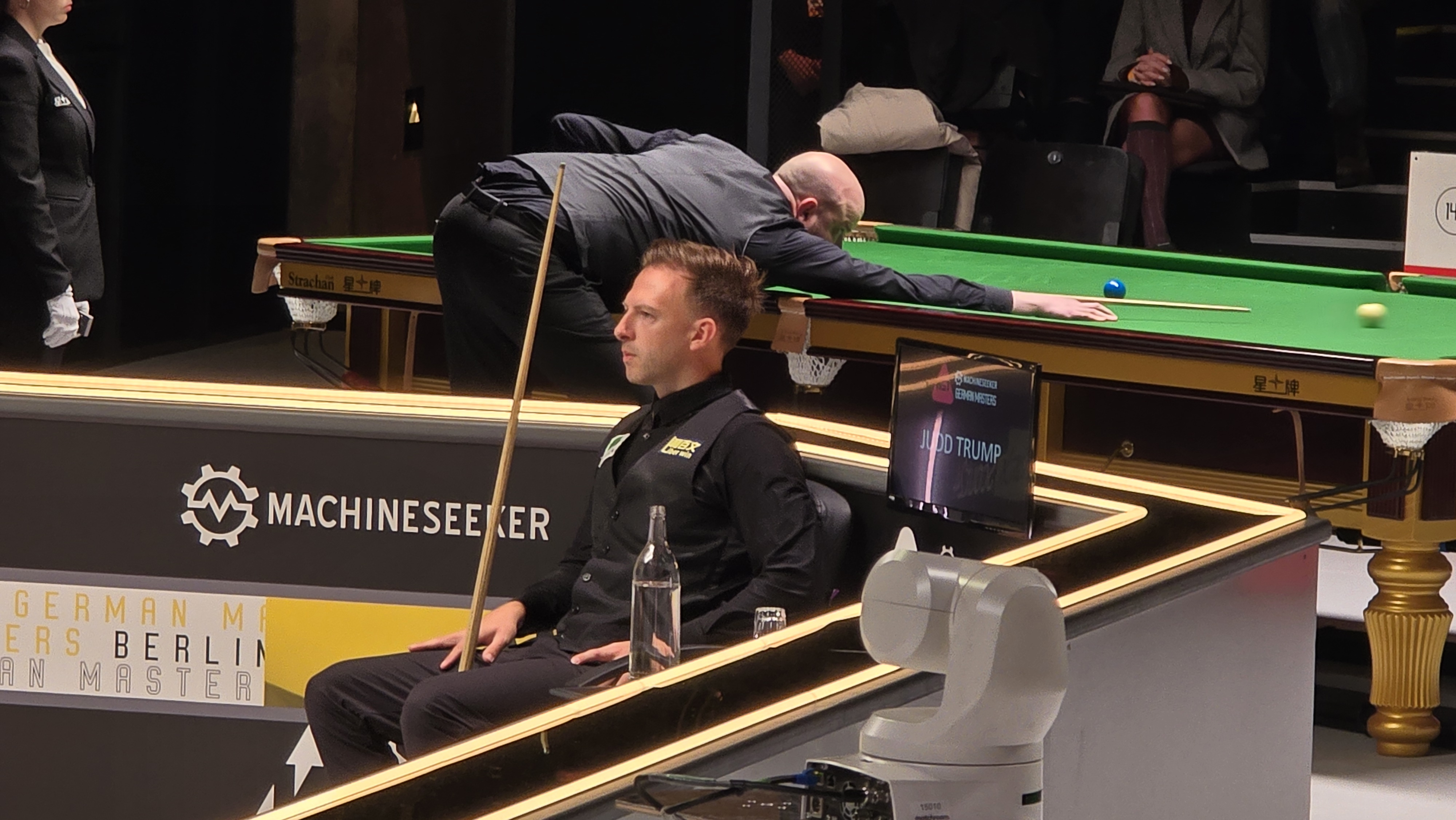
The world number one and 2019 champion Judd Trump (pictured in 2026) lost in a deciding frame to Hossein Vafaei.

The world number one Trump faced Vafaei, the only qualifier to reach the second round. The scores were tied at 4–4 after the opening session, but Trump finished the second session with a 9–7 lead. In the final session, Trump led 12–11, but Vafaei made a century of 106 to force a deciding frame, which he won with a break of 91 to reach the quarter-finals for the first time, following two previous second-round defeats. The players embraced after the match as Vafaei received a standing ovation. "I wasn't nervous. I enjoyed every minute," Vafaei said afterwards. "It was a fantastic feeling against the world number one." Trump commented: "It hurts but I had my chances... I'm not angry about it, I just was not good enough." Robertson faced Wakelin, who had beaten him 10–8 in the first round the previous year. Robertson led 4–1 in the first session, but Wakelin tied the scores at 4–4. Robertson won three consecutive frames in the second session, after which he led 10–6. Robertson won another three frames in a row in the third session, securing a 13–7 win. He commented: "It was a really enjoyable match because Chris [Wakelin] and I play in a similar way, always trying to stay on the front foot."

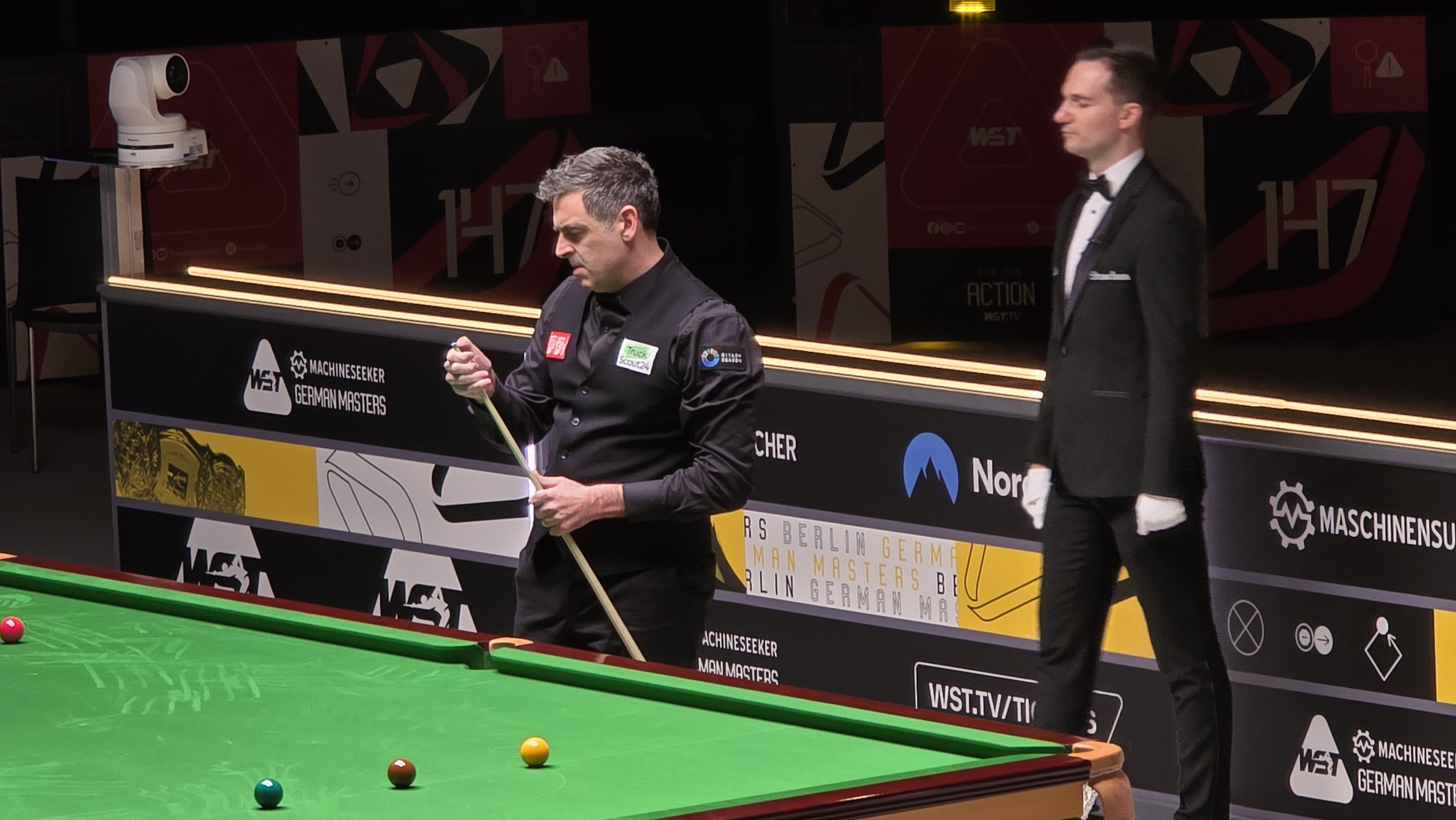
The seven-time champion Ronnie O'Sullivan (pictured in 2026) led John Higgins 9–4 but lost the match 12–13.

O'Sullivan and Higgins faced each other for the seventh time at the World Championship, each having won three of their previous Crucible encounters. They had last met at the tournament in the semi-finals of the 2022 edition, when O'Sullivan won 17–11. O'Sullivan made breaks of 86, 82, 137, 95, and 76 in the first session as he took a 6–2 lead. In the second session, O'Sullivan led 8–3 and 9–4, but Higgins won the last three frames, taking the last two on the final black, as he reduced O'Sullivan's lead to 9–7. O'Sullivan thumped the table out of frustration after missing a red in the last frame of the session. Higgins also won the first three frames of the final session, making back-to-back centuries of 118 and 128 as he moved into a 10–9 lead. Having lost six consecutive frames at the Crucible for only the fifth time, O'Sullivan won the next two with breaks of 62 and 93, but Higgins responded with breaks of 111 and 88 to move one from victory at 12–11. O'Sullivan tied the scores at 12–12, but Higgins won the deciding frame. The players received a standing ovation after the match. "In the first two sessions I didn't play well and Ronnie [O'Sullivan] was brilliant. I felt a bit inferior," said Higgins afterwards. "At 9–4 last night I felt I had to win the last three frames to have a chance." O'Sullivan commented: "There was pressure out there and I felt tight, maybe because I haven't been playing that many tournaments. But I feel in a better place with my game than I have done in the past three years." Former champions Stephen Hendry and Doherty praised the quality of the match. "You just can't play snooker better than this," said Hendry, while Doherty called the encounter "one of the greatest last-16 matches I've ever seen."

Selby opened his match against Wu with back-to-back centuries of 123 and 124. Wu, who had won his first ranking title at the 2025 International Championship the previous November, won the next three frames, but Selby took two of the last three to tie the scores at 4–4. Wu led 9–7 after the second session. In the final session, Selby reduced Wu's lead to one at 10–9, but Wu won the 53-minute 20th frame to move 11–9 ahead. Selby hit the table with his cue in frustration after missing a red in the 21st frame, which Wu won to lead 12–9. Wu went on to secure a 13–11 victory. Calling the match "tough and exhausting", Wu said: "I spent a lot of time in safety exchanges in almost every frame. What made me happy was that I could go back and forth with him. It's the first time I felt I performed so well defensively." Selby praised his opponent after the match, saying: "I think he is a World Champion in the making."

==== Quarter-finals ====
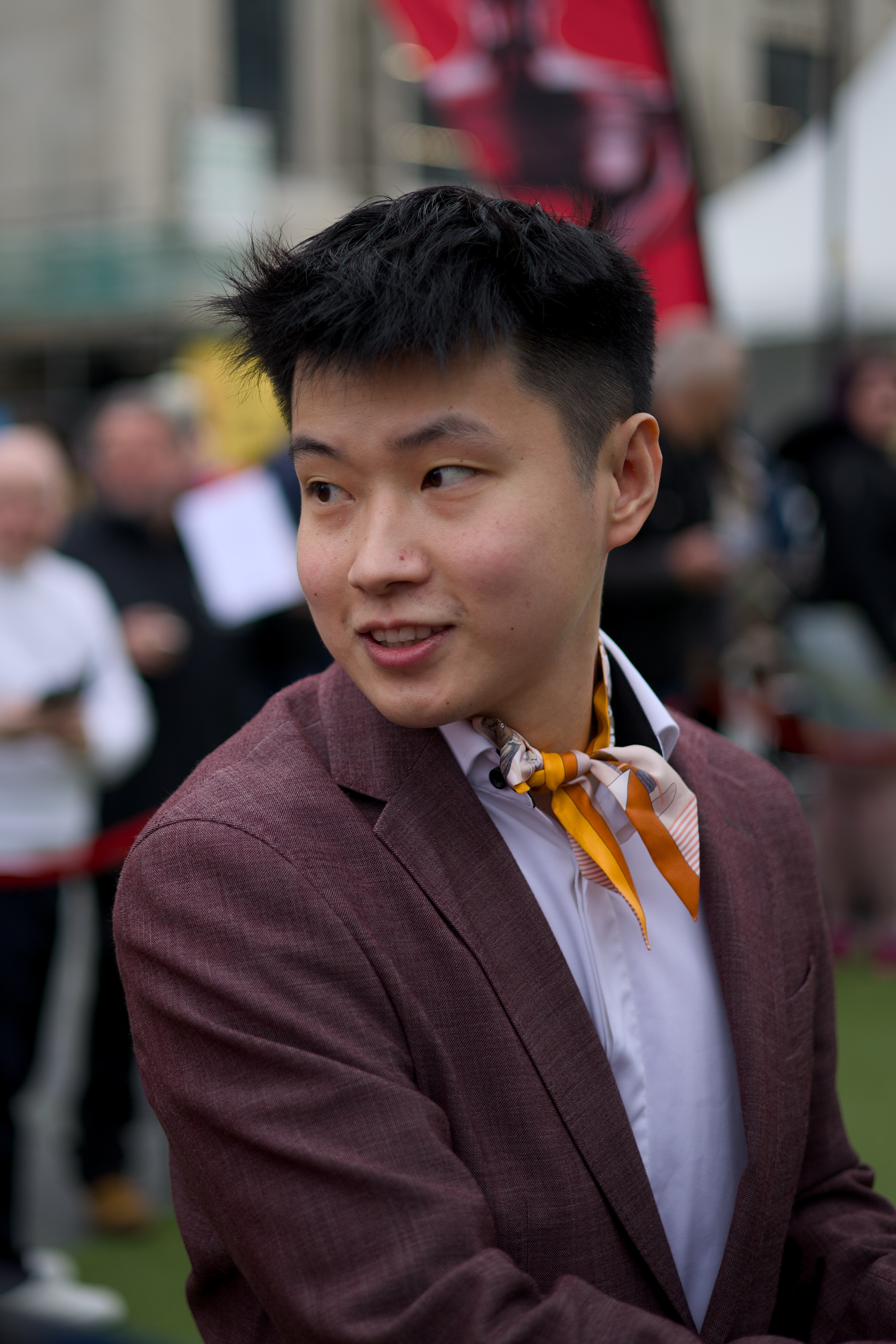
The defending champion Zhao Xintong (pictured before the event) lost 10–13 to Shaun Murphy, becoming the 21st player to experience the so-called "Crucible curse".

The quarter-finals were played on 28 and 29 April as the best of 25 frames, held over three sessions. Facing Murphy, the defending champion Zhao opened with a century of 122 and went on to win the first three frames. Murphy then took five frames in a row, winning both the sixth and eighth frames on the last pink, to lead 5–3 after the first session. Zhao won three of the last four frames in the second session as he tied the scores at 8–8. In the final session, Murphy won three consecutive frames and went on to complete a 13–10 win. "I think when you are playing a great player, which Zhao unquestionably is, it makes it straightforward for you," Murphy said. "I just knew I had to play properly and knew I had to be somewhere near my best and I think I was." Zhao's defeat made him the 21st player to experience the so-called "Crucible curse".

Facing Allen, Hawkins took a 4–3 lead. Allen led by 56 points in the final frame of the session but missed a red, and Hawkins produced a 63 clearance to extend his lead to 5–3. In the second session, Hawkins led 7–5. In frame 13, Allen made a 138 break, the 700th century of his professional career. Hawkins responded with a total clearance of 140 to win frame 14, but Allen made another century of 131 to take frame 15 and then won frame 16 on the last pink, tying the scores at 8–8. In the final session, Allen led 12–11. In the 24th frame, Hawkins fluked the last red while escaping from a snooker. He attempted a roll-up behind the pink but failed to make contact with the object ball, fouling and leaving himself snookered. Allen secured a 13–11 victory and said afterwards: "I didn't want it to go 12–12 so when Barry [Hawkins] fluked the red my heart sank. But when he left the cue ball short of the pink, I was doing somersaults inside." Of his error on the pink in the final frame, Hawkins commented: "I was gutted. What a way to lose, knowing you have played an absolute terrible shot. It was a sinking feeling after trying so hard in a long match like that."

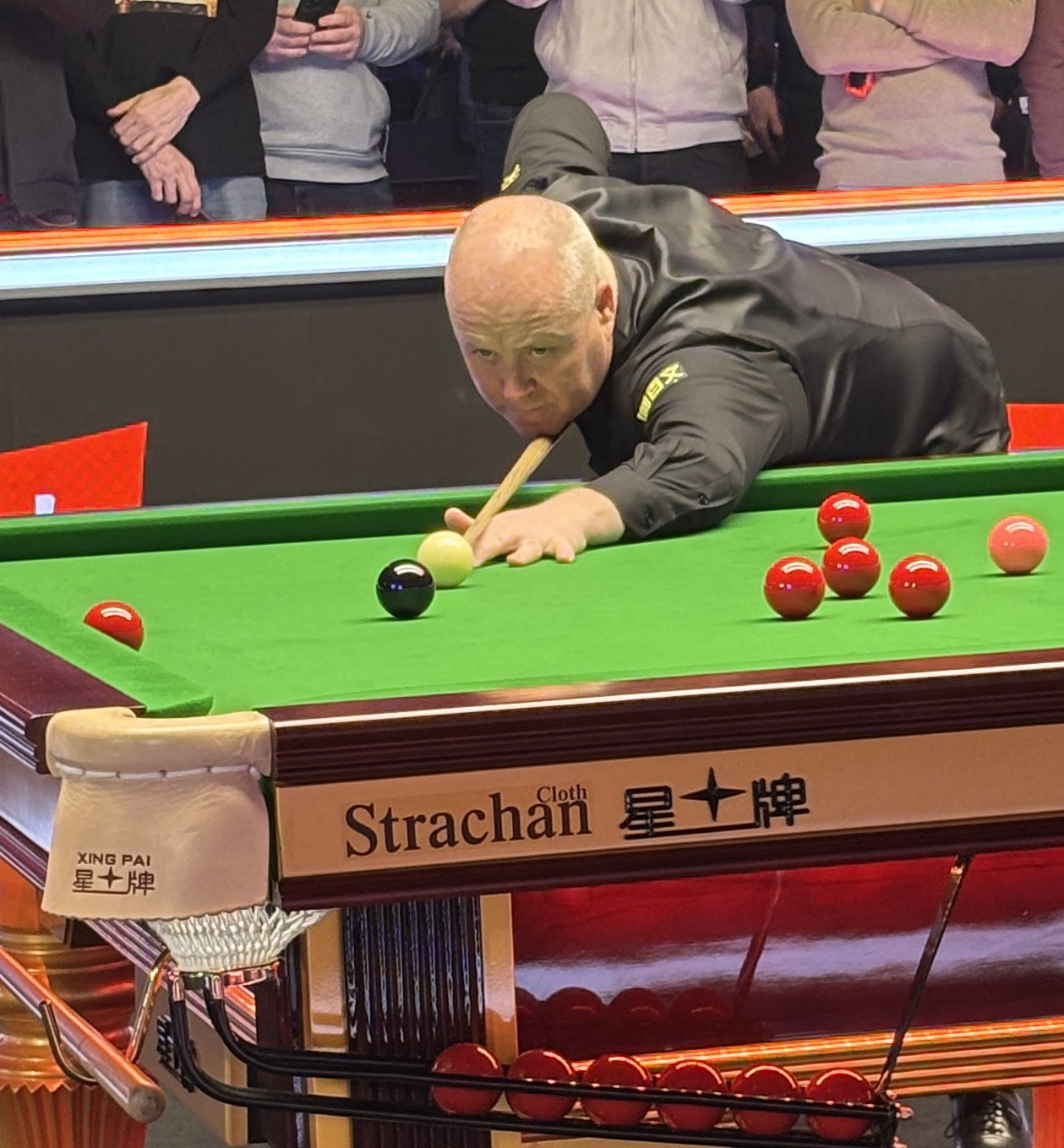
John Higgins (pictured in 2026) recovered from 6–9 behind to beat Neil Robertson 13–10. He became the oldest semi-finalist since Ray Reardon in 1985.

Higgins, competing in the World Championship quarter-finals for a 20th time, faced Robertson. The scores were tied at 2–2 but Robertson won three of the next four to lead 5–3 after the first session. In the second session, Robertson moved 6–3 ahead, but Higgins tied the scores at 6–6. Robertson won three consecutive frames to lead 9–6, but Higgins won the last of the session, leaving Robertson 9–7 ahead. In the final session, Higgins tied the scores at 9–9 and 10–10 and went on to complete a 13–10 victory, having won seven of the last eight frames. "I think there has been a mentality shift in the last two years, not getting too down on myself," Higgins said afterwards. "I really think I'm a different person coming to events. I hope to play well but if I don't then I don't. I've got a better mindset and I think that has helped me." It was the 12th consecutive year Robertson had failed to reach the final four, having last reached the semi-finals at the 2014 edition. He commented: "It was always going to be tough against [Higgins]. I'm just disappointed I couldn't get the match on my terms."

Both Wu and Vafaei played in the World Championship quarter-finals for the first time. Vafaei won two of the first three frames, but Wu made breaks of 90, 56, 56, and 52 as he won three in a row for a 4–2 lead. Vafaei won frame seven with a break of 71 and then came from behind to take the last of the session, tying the scores at 4–4. Vafaei also took the opening frame of the second session with a century of 106, but Wu then won five consecutive frames with breaks of 76, 71, 52, 102, and 92 to lead 9–5. Vafaei won frame 15, but Wu took the last of the session with a 90 break for a 10–6 advantage. Wu won the opening frame of the final session with a 75 break. Vafaei won the next with breaks of 71 and 55, but Wu produced a total clearance of 135 to lead 12–7 and went on to secure a 13–8 victory. "For me, it's about maintaining a high level consistently in scoring, as well as the defensive game. Everything has to be solid if you want to win," Wu said afterwards. "I've been putting in extra work to improve my safety play. In these long-frame matches, you need to do everything well to come out on top." Vafaei said: "I have turned a bad season into a much better one so I feel more positive and I have learned a lot."

==== Semi-finals ====
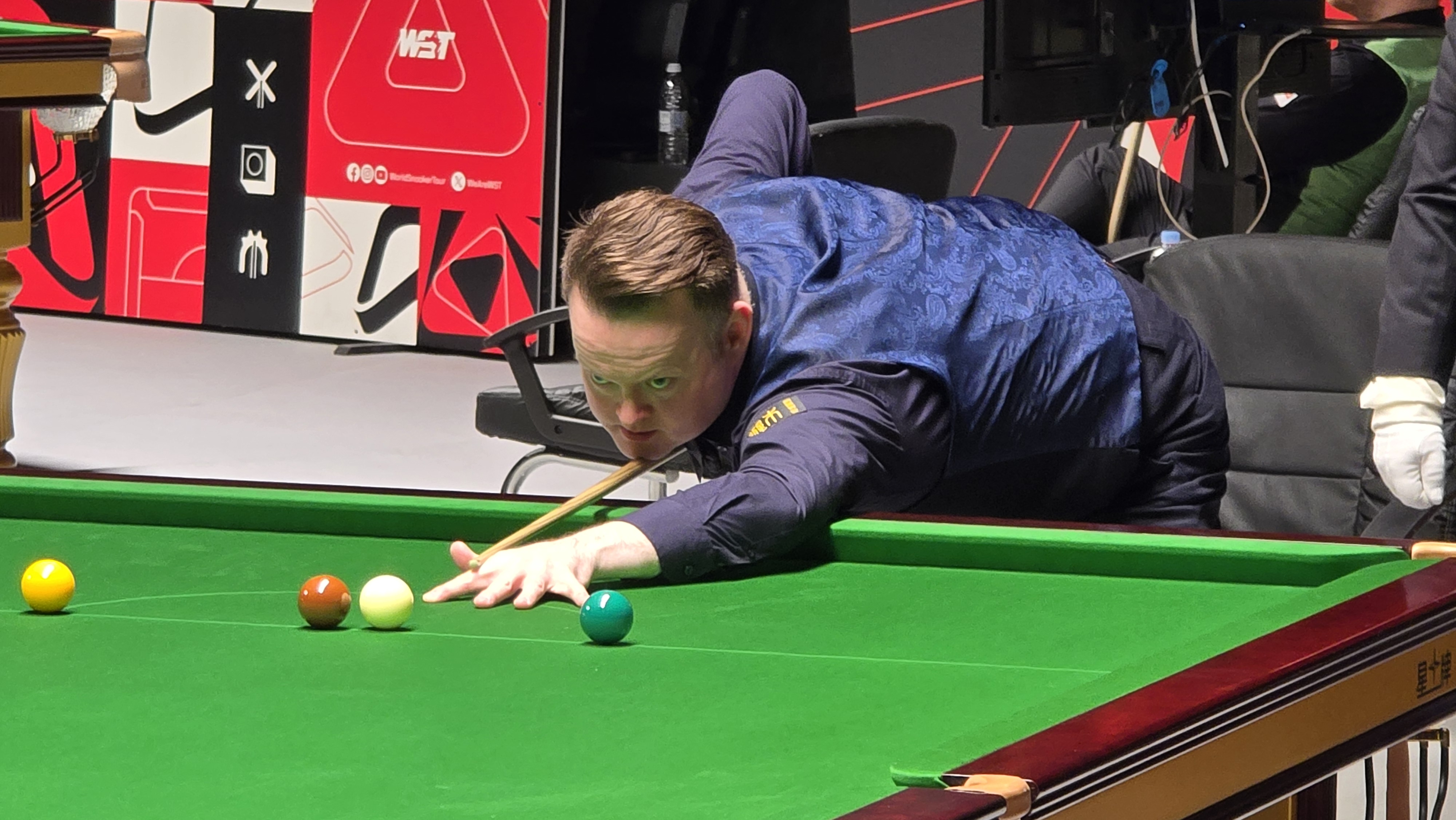
Shaun Murphy (pictured in 2026) made his 100th century break at the Crucible. He defeated John Higgins 17–15 to reach his fifth World Championship final.

The semi-finals were played from 30 April to 2 May as the best of 33 frames, held over four sessions. Higgins contested his 12th World Championship semi-final, equalling Hendry and trailing only O'Sullivan, who had made 14 semi-final appearances. The semi-final was Higgins's 100th match at the Crucible. At 50 years and 347 days old, he became the oldest World Championship semi-finalist since Ray Reardon, who had been 52 years and 199 days old at the 1985 edition. He faced Murphy, who was contesting his sixth World Championship semi-final, having won four of his previous five. The two had met twice before at the Crucible, Murphy having defeated Higgins 13–8 in the quarter-finals of the 2005 edition, and Higgins having beaten Murphy 18–9 in the final of the 2009 edition.

BBC journalist Steve Sutcliffe noted that in the first session Higgins "appeared to still be feeling the effects of his late-night quarter-final victory over Neil Robertson", describing his play as "an error-strewn showing." Murphy made breaks of 68, 69, and 100 as he took a 3–1 lead. Higgins made a highest break in the session of just 50, but he won three of the last four frames played, tying the scores at 4–4. In the second session, the scores were tied at 5–5 and 6–6. Higgins took an 8–6 lead, but Murphy won the last two frames of the session to level at 8–8. In the third session, the scores were tied again at 9–9, 10–10, and 11–11. Murphy's 105 break in the 22nd frame was his 100th century at the Crucible, making him the fifth player, after Hendry, O'Sullivan, Higgins, and Selby, to reach that milestone. Higgins responded with breaks of 70 and 101 as he took the last two frames of the session, ending it 13–11 ahead. Murphy won the first two frames of the final session with back-to-back centuries of 132 and 127, tying the scores at 13–13. Higgins took the next two frames to go 15–13 in front, but Murphy then won four consecutive frames, making breaks including 105 and 78 as he secured a 17–15 victory. On reaching the final, Murphy said: "I have worked so hard to get back to this stage, in the hunt for that rhythm and timing and commitment under pressure. I am going to give it absolutely everything." Higgins said: "I can't be too disappointed because Shaun [Murphy] was superb."

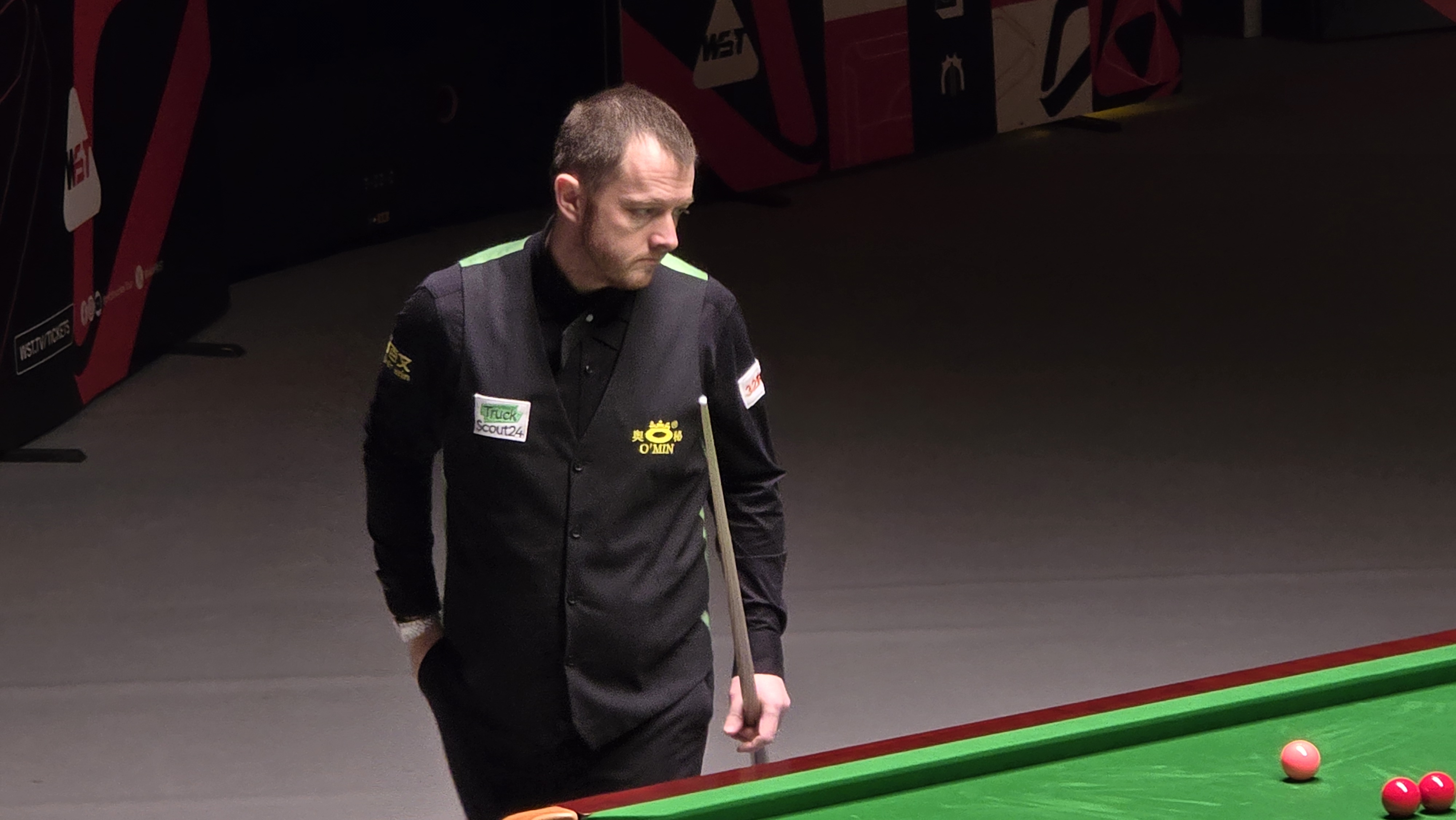
Mark Allen (pictured in 2026) lost 16–17 to Wu Yize after missing a match-ball black off its spot in the penultimate frame. The 14th frame was the longest in Crucible history, at 100 minutes and 21 seconds.

Allen played in his third World Championship semi-final, having previously reached that stage at the 2009 and 2023 editions. He faced Wu, who won the first two frames. Midway through frame three, television coverage was disrupted for 15 minutes due to a technical fault. Allen completed a break of 91 to win the frame, after which the players left the arena until the issue was resolved. Allen also took frame four to tie the scores at 2–2, but Wu then won four in a row, ending the session 6–2 ahead.

In the second session, Allen won the first five frames, making centuries of 145 (the highest break of the main stage) and 121 as he moved into a 7–6 lead. During the 14th frame, the last eight reds became clustered around the black, which was blocking a top corner pocket. Wu repeatedly rolled the cue ball into the reds and Allen repeatedly played away again. After the players had taken 75 consecutive safety shots from that position, with the audience cheering and slow-clapping, tournament director Rob Spencer instructed referee Marcel Eckardt to give Allen and Wu three further shots each to resolve the stalemate or face a re-rack. Allen, who then had a 34-point lead, objected to a re-rack and ended the impasse by potting the black and fouling. Wu moved ahead, leaving Allen requiring snookers, and eventually secured the frame by potting the last pink. The frame lasted 100 minutes and 21 seconds, a new record for the longest frame played at the Crucible, surpassing the 85-minute and 22-second frame between Selby and Yan Bingtao at the 2022 edition. It included a 55-minute period during which neither player potted a ball. Speaking during the BBC's coverage, six-time champion Steve Davis called the frame "an embarrassment to snooker", while Hendry called it "the most ludicrous frame of snooker in Crucible history." The second session ended after the 14th frame due to time constraints, with the scores tied at 7–7.

In the third session, Wu made breaks of 142, 76, and 121 as he moved 10–8 ahead, but Allen tied the scores at 10–10 with breaks of 85 and 99. Wu produced a century of 140 to win frame 21, but Allen took the last frame of the session to tie the scores again at 11–11. Allen also took the first frame of the final session. The players then traded frames as Wu tied the scores at 12–12, made a century of 126 to level at 13–13, and also drew level at 14–14 before Allen again moved ahead at 15–14. In frame 30, Wu missed a red while on a break of 58, and Allen recovered to win the frame, moving one from victory at 16–14. Allen had match-winning opportunities in all three remaining frames. In frame 31, he was on a break of 45 when he missed a red, and Wu won the frame with a 67 clearance. In frame 32, Allen missed the last red while leading by 10 points, but Wu's attempted clearance ended when he missed the last pink. Allen potted the pink but then missed a match-ball black off its spot that would have advanced him to his first world final. Wu potted the black to tie the scores at 16–16. In the deciding frame, Allen made a break of 47 but lost position while trying to split the pack, and Wu won the frame and match with a clearance of 71. The Guardian called the ending of the match "one of the most dramatic last-four finishes in Crucible history."

In his post-match interview, Allen said: "I had my chances and completely blew it, to be honest. I always fancy myself under pressure, but I didn't cope with it today. When you miss a black like that, you don't deserve to win." He praised his opponent, saying: "Wu played really well. All credit to him. I am devastated to lose, but I think the right person is in the final." Wu commented: "I feel sorry for Mark [Allen]. I thought I was going to lose, but I was able to take the opportunity." Speaking to BBC Radio Ulster several weeks later, Allen said that he had been unable to view the televised footage of his missed pot on the match-ball black as it "hurts too much." He said he had "been asked a million times" why he missed the shot, but said "I don't know what the answer is." Remarking that he had been occupying himself with charity work since the match "or else I may not have left the house," he said he hoped to have more opportunities to win the World Championship, as he did not want to be "remembered for one shot."

==== Final ====
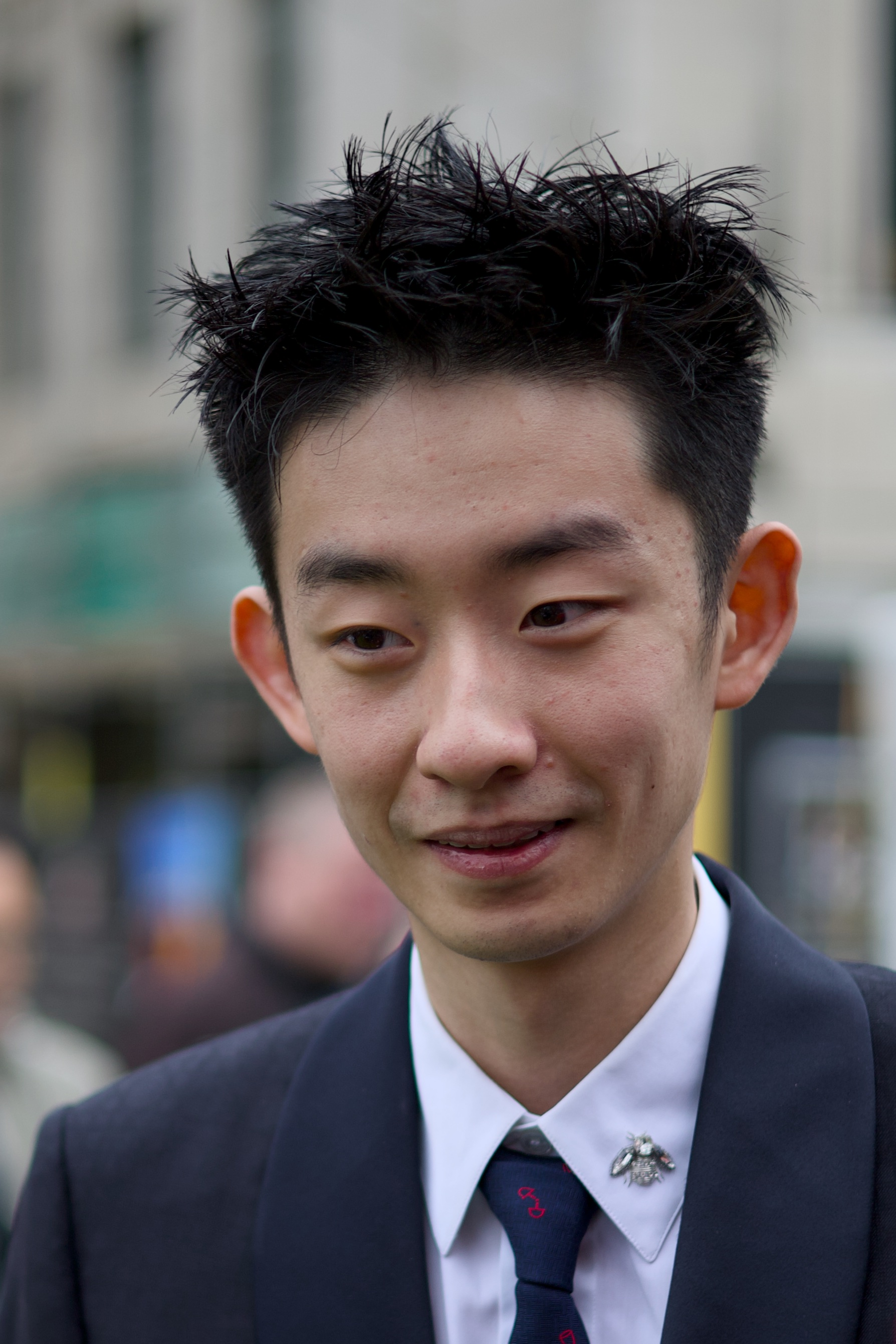
Wu Yize (pictured before the event) defeated Shaun Murphy 18–17 to win his maiden world title, becoming the second winner from Asia and the second-youngest World Champion.

The final was played on 3 and 4 May as the best of 35 frames, held over four sessions, between the eighth seed Murphy and the tenth seed Wu. Murphy contested the fifth World Championship final of his career, having previously won the title in 2005 and been runner-up in 2009, 2015, and 2021. Wu competed in his first World Championship final, never having won a match at the Crucible before that year. The 30th ranking final of Murphy's career and the fourth of Wu's career, it was the third professional match between the players, Murphy having defeated Wu 5–4 in the last 32 of the 2025 Xi'an Grand Prix and Wu having beaten Murphy 6–2 in the first round of the 2026 Masters. Rob Spencer, a referee on the professional tour since 2013, officiated his first World Championship final.

Wu won the first three frames, making breaks including 51 and 61. During the third frame, a female spectator jumped the barrier at the front row and entered the playing area, but the referee prevented her from approaching the table, and security removed her from the arena. The woman, who shouted an objection to paying the television licence, was later identified as an OnlyFans model. Murphy made breaks of 85, 98, 77, and 109 as he won the next four frames. Wu won frame eight, tying the scores at 4–4 after the first session. In the second session, Wu won four of the first five frames played, making breaks including 82, 103, and 89 as he moved 8–5 ahead. Murphy narrowed Wu's lead to 9–7, but Wu made a 91 break in the last frame of the session for a three-frame overnight lead at 10–7.

Murphy won the first five frames of the third session, making breaks including 76, 52, 59, 55, and 60 as he moved 12–10 ahead. Wu won the last three frames of the session, making breaks including 64, 60, and 61 as he regained a one-frame lead at 13–12. Wu also won the first frame of the final session with an 88 break, moving 14–12 ahead, but Murphy made an 82 break to win frame 27 and then tied the scores at 14–14. Wu won frame 29, but Murphy recovered from 70 points behind in frame 30 to level at 15–15. Wu took the lead again by winning frame 31, but Murphy responded with a century of 131 to tie the scores at 16–16. In frame 33, Murphy missed a red while on a break of 45, and Wu made a 91 break to move one frame from victory at 17–16. Wu had a match-winning opportunity in frame 34 but missed the black off its spot while on a break of 43, and Murphy levelled at 17–17 with a 75 break. It was the fourth time the World Championship final had gone to a deciding frame at the Crucible, following the 1985 final between Dennis Taylor and Steve Davis, the 1994 final between Hendry and Jimmy White, and the 2002 final between Peter Ebdon and Hendry. Wu won the decider with a break of 85 to secure an 18–17 victory. In all, the final featured three centuries and 29 other breaks of 50 or more.

Wu won his first world title, first Triple Crown title, and second ranking title. He became the second World Champion from Asia and the second from mainland China, following Zhao. At the age of 22 years and 202 days, he became the second-youngest winner in the tournament's history, after Hendry, who had been 21 years and 106 days old at the 1990 edition. Wu was the fourth consecutive first-time winner, following Brecel in 2023, Kyren Wilson in 2024, and Zhao in 2025, setting a new record for the longest streak of maiden winners at the tournament. "I am so happy I could play like that today," Wu said after the match. "I played for my family, for myself and for China. My parents are the true champions. Since I made the decision to drop out of school, my dad has been by my side. My mum has also been through so much over the years. They are the source of my strength and I love them so much." After losing his fourth world final out of five played, Murphy commented: "It was a great match. It had everything. Wu is one of the most talented players I have ever seen. I don't feel I lost the final—Wu won it. I couldn't have tried harder and I am very proud of the way I played." Wu finished the season at a career high of fourth in the snooker world rankings, with Murphy advancing to sixth. Writing in the New York Times, Tim Spiers called the championship "one of the best tournaments in recent years," and said "the two semis and the final were all bona fide classics."

== Main draw ==
The draw for the main tournament is shown below. The numbers in parentheses after the players' names denote the seedings for the 16 seeded players. The match winners are shown in bold.

**Round 1 (Last 32)**; Best of 19 frames
18 April
**Zhao Xintong (CHN) (1)**	**10**
Liam Highfield (ENG)	7
19 & 20 April
**Ding Junhui (CHN) (16)**	**10**
David Gilbert (ENG)	5
18 & 19 April
**Xiao Guodong (CHN) (9)**	**10**
Zhou Yuelong (CHN)	6
20 & 21 April
**Shaun Murphy (ENG) (8)**	**10**
Fan Zhengyi (CHN)	9
19 & 20 April
**John Higgins (SCO) (5)**	**10**
Ali Carter (ENG)	7
21 & 22 April
**Ronnie O'Sullivan (ENG) (12)**	**10**
He Guoqiang (CHN)	2
21 & 22 April
**Chris Wakelin (ENG) (13)**	**10**
Liam Pullen (ENG)	6
22 & 23 April
**Neil Robertson (AUS) (4)**	**10**
Pang Junxu (CHN)	6
20 April
**Kyren Wilson (ENG) (3)**	**10**
Stan Moody (ENG)	7
18 & 19 April
**Mark Allen (NIR) (14)**	**10**
Zhang Anda (CHN)	6
18 & 19 April
**Barry Hawkins (ENG) (11)**	**10**
Matthew Stevens (WAL)	4
18 & 19 April
**Mark Williams (WAL) (6)**	**10**
Antoni Kowalski (POL)	4
22 April
**Mark Selby (ENG) (7)**	**10**
Jak Jones (WAL)	2
20 & 21 April
**Wu Yize (CHN) (10)**	**10**
Lei Peifan (CHN)	2
22 & 23 April
Si Jiahui (CHN) (15)	3
**Hossein Vafaei (IRN)**	**10**
21 April
**Judd Trump (ENG) (2)**	**10**
Gary Wilson (ENG)	5

**Round 2 (Last 16)**; Best of 25 frames
24, 25 & 26 April
**Zhao Xintong (CHN) (1)**	**13**
Ding Junhui (CHN) (16)	9
23 & 24 April
Xiao Guodong (CHN) (9)	3
**Shaun Murphy (ENG) (8)**	**13**
25, 26 & 27 April
**John Higgins (SCO) (5)**	**13**
Ronnie O'Sullivan (ENG) (12)	12
25, 26 & 27 April
Chris Wakelin (ENG) (13)	7
**Neil Robertson (AUS) (4)**	**13**
23, 24 & 25 April
Kyren Wilson (ENG) (3)	9
**Mark Allen (NIR) (14)**	**13**
24 & 25 April
**Barry Hawkins (ENG) (11)**	**13**
Mark Williams (WAL) (6)	9
26 & 27 April
Mark Selby (ENG) (7)	11
**Wu Yize (CHN) (10)**	**13**
25, 26 & 27 April
**Hossein Vafaei (IRN)**	**13**
Judd Trump (ENG) (2)	12

**Quarter-finals**; Best of 25 frames
28 & 29 April
Zhao Xintong (CHN) (1)	10
**Shaun Murphy (ENG) (8)**	**13**
28 & 29 April
**John Higgins (SCO) (5)**	**13**
Neil Robertson (AUS) (4)	10
28 & 29 April
**Mark Allen (NIR) (14)**	**13**
Barry Hawkins (ENG) (11)	11
28 & 29 April
**Wu Yize (CHN) (10)**	**13**
Hossein Vafaei (IRN)	8

**Semi-finals**; Best of 33 frames
30 April, 1 & 2 May
**Shaun Murphy (ENG) (8)**	**17**
John Higgins (SCO) (5)	15
30 April, 1 & 2 May
Mark Allen (NIR) (14)	16
**Wu Yize (CHN) (10)**	**17**

**Final**; Best of 35 frames
3 & 4 May
Shaun Murphy (ENG) (8)	17
**Wu Yize (CHN) (10)**	**18**

=== Final: frame scores ===
Final: (Best of 35 frames) Crucible Theatre, Sheffield, 3 & 4 May 2026; Referee: Rob Spencer
Shaun Murphy (8); England				17–**18**			**Wu Yize** (10); China			
Session 1: 4–4 (4–4)
Frame	1	2	3	4	5	6	7	8	9	10
Murphy	50	50 (50)	53	**95**† (85)	**98**† (98)	**90**† (77)	**118**† (109)	32	N/A	N/A
Wu	**72**† (51)	**60**†	**86**† (61)	0	0	24	1	**74**† (65)	N/A	N/A
Session 2: 3–**6** (7–**10**)
Frame	1	2	3	4	5	6	7	8	9	10
Murphy	1	16	**80**† (72)	8	8	**83**† (70)	29	**66**†	39	N/A
Wu	**82**† (82)	**106**† (103)	32	**72**†	**89**† (89)	0	**97**† (66)	1	**91**† (91)	N/A
Session 3: **5**–3 (12–**13**)
Frame	1	2	3	4	5	6	7	8	9	10
Murphy	**103**†	**76**† (76)	**62**† (52)	**120**† (59, 55)	**67**† (60)	0	1	5	N/A	N/A
Wu	37	9	13	2	37	**93**† (64)	**73**†	**121**† (61, 60)	N/A	N/A
Session 4: 5–5 (17–**18**)
Frame	1	2	3	4	5	6	7	8	9	10
Murphy	1	**82**† (82)	**75**†	56	**73**† (65)	0	**131**† (131)	45	**75**† (75)	8
Wu	**88**† (88)	0	26	**60**†	70 (70)	**65**† (56)	1	**91**† (91)	43	**85**† (85)
(frame 32) **131**				Highest break			103 (frame 10)			
**2**				Century breaks			1			
14				50+ breaks			**15**			
(China) Wu Yize wins the 2026 World Snooker Championship † = Winner of frame

== Qualifying draw ==
The results of the qualifying rounds are shown below. The numbers in parentheses after the players' names denote the seedings for each player; an "a" indicates amateur players not on the main tour. The match winners are shown in bold.

**Round 1 (Last 144)**; Best of 19 frames
Mitchell Mann (ENG) (81)	4
**Wang Xinbo (CHN) (a)**	**10**
Jonas Luz (BRA) (112)	2
**Peter Lines (ENG) (a)**	**10**
**Michał Szubarczyk (POL) (96)**	**10**
Ng On-yee (HKG) (120)	7
**Gao Yang (CHN) (97)**	**10**
Jimmy White (ENG) (119)	9
**Yao Pengcheng (CHN) (104)**	**10**
Ryan Davies (ENG) (a)	9
Huang Jiahao (CHN) (89)	5
**Leone Crowley (IRL) (114)**	**10**
**Bai Yulu (CHN) (105)**	**10**
Daniel Womersley (ENG) (a)	7
**Robbie McGuigan (NIR) (88)**	**10**
Hammad Miah (ENG) (a)	8
Cheung Ka Wai (HKG) (85)	9
**Ashley Carty (ENG) (a)**	**10**
**Ross Muir (SCO) (108)**	**10**
Mykhailo Larkov (UKR) (a)	5
Haris Tahir (PAK) (92)	6
**Connor Benzey (ENG) (116)**	**10**
Reanne Evans (ENG) (101)	7
**Vladislav Gradinari (MDA) (a)**	**10**
Ken Doherty (IRL) (100)	5
**Patrick Whelan (ENG) (a)**	**10**
**Dylan Emery (WAL) (93)**	**10**
Anton Kazakov (UKR) (a)	9
**Mateusz Baranowski (POL) (109)**	**10**
Florian Nüßle (AUT) (118)	5
**Liam Pullen (ENG) (84)**	**10**
Alfie Burden (ENG) (a)	9
**Marco Fu (HKG) (83)**	**10**
Mink Nutcharut (THA) (117)	1
Alexander Ursenbacher (SUI) (110)	w/d
**Prin Ratmukda** (THA) (a)	**w/o**
**Ian Burns (ENG) (94)**	**10**
Sahil Nayyar (CAN) (121)	6
**Chris Totten (SCO) (99)**	**10**
Daniel Boyes (ENG) (a)	5
**Xu Yichen (CHN) (102)**	**10**
Stuart Carrington (ENG) (a)	4
**Steven Hallworth (ENG) (91)**	**10**
Kreishh Gurbaxani (IND) (122)	6
Liam Graham (SCO) (107)	4
**Oliver Sykes (ENG) (a)**	**10**
**Bulcsú Révész (HUN) (86)**	**10**
Craig Steadman (ENG) (a)	6
David Grace (ENG) (87)	4
**Ashley Hugill (ENG) (a)**	**10**
**Zhao Hanyang (CHN) (106)**	**10**
Mahmoud El Hareedy (EGY) (124)	3
**Liam Highfield (ENG) (90)**	**10**
Oliver Brown (ENG) (115)	4
Liu Wenwei (CHN) (103)	3
**Mark Lloyd (ENG) (a)**	**10**
**Lan Yuhao (CHN) (98)**	**10**
Chatchapong Nasa (THA) (113)	5
Haydon Pinhey (ENG) (95)	5
**Jamie Clarke (WAL) (a)**	**10**
Hatem Yassen (EGY) (111)	4
**Fergal Quinn (NIR) (123)**	**10**
Farakh Ajaib (PAK) (82)	7
**Umut Dikme (GER) (a)**	**10**

**Round 2 (Last 112)**; Best of 19 frames
Iulian Boiko (UKR) (80)	4
**Wang Xinbo (CHN) (a)**	**10**
Scott Donaldson (SCO) (49)	8
**Peter Lines (ENG) (a)**	**10**
Sanderson Lam (ENG) (65)	8
**Michał Szubarczyk (POL) (96)**	**10**
Mark Davis (ENG) (64)	6
**Gao Yang (CHN) (97)**	**10**
David Lilley (ENG) (57)	5
**Yao Pengcheng (CHN) (104)**	**10**
Duane Jones (WAL) (72)	5
**Leone Crowley (IRL) (114)**	**10**
**Michael Holt (ENG) (56)**	**10**
Bai Yulu (CHN) (105)	4
Gong Chenzhi (CHN) (73)	7
**Robbie McGuigan (NIR) (88)**	**10**
**Jiang Jun (CHN) (76)**	**10**
Ashley Carty (ENG) (a)	3
**Robbie Williams (ENG) (53)**	**10**
Ross Muir (SCO) (108)	4
**Antoni Kowalski (POL) (69)**	**10**
Connor Benzey (ENG) (116)	1
**Jamie Jones (WAL) (60)**	**10**
Vladislav Gradinari (MDA) (a)	3
Robert Milkins (ENG) (61)	3
**Patrick Whelan (ENG) (a)**	**10**
Artemijs Žižins (LAT) (68)	6
**Dylan Emery (WAL) (93)**	**10**
**Ricky Walden (ENG) (52)**	**10**
Mateusz Baranowski (POL) (109)	4
Amir Sarkhosh (IRN) (77)	7
**Liam Pullen (ENG) (84)**	**10**
Liam Davies (WAL) (78)	9
**Marco Fu (HKG) (83)**	**10**
**Chang Bingyu (CHN) (51)**	**10**
Prin Ratmukda (THA) (a)	2
**Jordan Brown (NIR) (67)**	**10**
Ian Burns (ENG) (94)	9
**Ishpreet Singh Chadha (IND) (62)**	**10**
Chris Totten (SCO) (99)	5
**Liu Hongyu (CHN) (59)**	**10**
Xu Yichen (CHN) (102)	5
**Allan Taylor (ENG) (70)**	**10**
Steven Hallworth (ENG) (91)	6
Lyu Haotian (CHN) (54)	8
**Oliver Sykes (ENG) (a)**	**10**
Louis Heathcote (ENG) (75)	8
**Bulcsú Révész (HUN) (86)**	**10**
**Julien Leclercq (BEL) (74)**	**10**
Ashley Hugill (ENG) (a)	7
**Martin O'Donnell (ENG) (55)**	**10**
Zhao Hanyang (CHN) (106)	5
Wang Yuchen (HKG) (71)	4
**Liam Highfield (ENG) (90)**	**10**
**Oliver Lines (ENG) (58)**	**10**
Mark Lloyd (ENG) (a)	2
**Fan Zhengyi (CHN) (63)**	**10**
Lan Yuhao (CHN) (98)	3
**Ben Mertens** (BEL) (66)	**w/o**
Jamie Clarke (WAL) (a) (Note: Jamie Clarke withdrew from the match due to illness after the fifth frame, having trailed Ben Mertens 0–5.)	w/d
**Long Zehuang (CHN) (50)**	**10**
Fergal Quinn (NIR) (123)	2
Sam Craigie (ENG) (79)	9
**Umut Dikme (GER) (a)**	**10**

**Round 3 (Last 80)**; Best of 19 frames
**Stuart Bingham (ENG) (17)**	**10**
Wang Xinbo (CHN) (a)	2
**Matthew Stevens (WAL) (48)**	**10**
Peter Lines (ENG) (a)	8
**Hossein Vafaei (IRN) (32)**	**10**
Michał Szubarczyk (POL) (96)	2
Tom Ford (ENG) (33)	8
**Gao Yang (CHN) (97)**	**10**
**Aaron Hill (IRL) (40)**	**10**
Yao Pengcheng (CHN) (104)	3
**David Gilbert (ENG) (25)**	**10**
Leone Crowley (IRL) (114)	3
Daniel Wells (WAL) (41)	5
**Michael Holt (ENG) (56)**	**10**
**Zhou Yuelong (CHN) (24)**	**10**
Robbie McGuigan (NIR) (88)	3
Elliot Slessor (ENG) (21)	7
**Jiang Jun (CHN) (76)**	**10**
**Stan Moody (ENG) (44)**	**10**
Robbie Williams (ENG) (53)	5
Joe O'Connor (ENG) (28)	8
**Antoni Kowalski (POL) (69)**	**10**
Matthew Selt (ENG) (37)	3
**Jamie Jones (WAL) (60)**	**10**
**Jackson Page (WAL) (36)**	**10**
Patrick Whelan (ENG) (a)	6
**Pang Junxu (CHN) (29)**	**10**
Dylan Emery (WAL) (93)	9
**Noppon Saengkham (THA) (45)**	**10**
Ricky Walden (ENG) (52)	6
Thepchaiya Un-Nooh (THA) (20)	7
**Liam Pullen (ENG) (84)**	**10**
**Jak Jones (WAL) (19)**	**10**
Marco Fu (HKG) (83)	6
**Luca Brecel (BEL) (46)**	**10**
Chang Bingyu (CHN) (51)	8
**Lei Peifan (CHN) (30)**	**10**
Jordan Brown (NIR) (67)	4
**Ryan Day (WAL) (35)**	**10**
Ishpreet Singh Chadha (IND) (62)	8
**Xu Si (CHN) (38)**	**10**
Liu Hongyu (CHN) (59)	8
**Gary Wilson (ENG) (27)**	**10**
Allan Taylor (ENG) (70)	1
**Zak Surety (ENG) (43)**	**10**
Oliver Sykes (ENG) (a)	3
**Zhang Anda (CHN) (22)**	**10**
Bulcsú Révész (HUN) (86)	6
**Ali Carter (ENG) (23)**	**10**
Julien Leclercq (BEL) (74)	5
**Anthony McGill (SCO) (42)**	**10**
Martin O'Donnell (ENG) (55)	9
Stephen Maguire (SCO) (26)	5
**Liam Highfield (ENG) (90)**	**10**
Ben Woollaston (ENG) (39)	8
**Oliver Lines (ENG) (58)**	**10**
Jimmy Robertson (ENG) (34)	4
**Fan Zhengyi (CHN) (63)**	**10**
Yuan Sijun (CHN) (31)	9
**Ben Mertens (BEL) (66)**	**10**
**He Guoqiang (CHN) (47)**	**10**
Long Zehuang (CHN) (50)	8
**Jack Lisowski (ENG) (18)**	**10**
Umut Dikme (GER) (a)	7

**Round 4 (Last 48)**; Best of 19 frames
Stuart Bingham (ENG) (17)	7
**Matthew Stevens (WAL) (48)**	**10**
**Hossein Vafaei (IRN) (32)**	**10**
Gao Yang (CHN) (97)	4
Aaron Hill (IRL) (40)	6
**David Gilbert (ENG) (25)**	**10**
Michael Holt (ENG) (56)	4
**Zhou Yuelong (CHN) (24)**	**10**
Jiang Jun (CHN) (76)	9
**Stan Moody (ENG) (44)**	**10**
**Antoni Kowalski (POL) (69)**	**10**
Jamie Jones (WAL) (60)	8
Jackson Page (WAL) (36)	8
**Pang Junxu (CHN) (29)**	**10**
Noppon Saengkham (THA) (45)	8
**Liam Pullen (ENG) (84)**	**10**
**Jak Jones (WAL) (19)**	**10**
Luca Brecel (BEL) (46)	5
**Lei Peifan (CHN) (30)**	**10**
Ryan Day (WAL) (35)	5
Xu Si (CHN) (38)	9
**Gary Wilson (ENG) (27)**	**10**
Zak Surety (ENG) (43)	3
**Zhang Anda (CHN) (22)**	**10**
**Ali Carter (ENG) (23)**	**10**
Anthony McGill (SCO) (42)	7
**Liam Highfield (ENG) (90)**	**10**
Oliver Lines (ENG) (58)	2
**Fan Zhengyi (CHN) (63)**	**10**
Ben Mertens (BEL) (66)	4
**He Guoqiang (CHN) (47)**	**10**
Jack Lisowski (ENG) (18)	5

Note: w/o = walkover; w/d = withdrawn

== Century breaks ==
=== Main stage centuries ===
A total of 81 century breaks were made during the main stage of the tournament.

- 145, 140, 140, 138, 131, 129, 121, 109, 104 – Mark Allen
- 142, 140, 135, 126, 121, 116, 105, 103, 102 – Wu Yize
- 140, 132, 131, 127, 115, 109, 105, 105, 103, 103, 103, 100 – Shaun Murphy
- 140, 127, 114, 113 – Barry Hawkins
- 139 – Gary Wilson
- 137, 116, 113, 113, 100 – Ronnie O'Sullivan
- 129, 109 – Zhang Anda
- 128, 126, 118, 111, 101 – John Higgins
- 128, 123, 122, 117, 116, 115, 112, 108 – Zhao Xintong
- 128, 122, 115 – Xiao Guodong
- 128, 115, 100 – Judd Trump
- 124, 123 – Mark Selby
- 124, 115 – Mark Williams
- 122 – Pang Junxu
- 121 – Liam Pullen
- 112 – Kyren Wilson
- 110, 101 – Stan Moody
- 106, 106, 105 – Hossein Vafaei
- 106, 100 – Ding Junhui
- 106 – Ali Carter
- 104, 101, 100 – Neil Robertson
- 101 – Liam Highfield
- 100 – Si Jiahui

=== Qualifying stage centuries ===
A total of 177 century breaks were made during the qualifying rounds. This was a record, surpassing the previous number of 143 set during the qualifying rounds for the 2025 World Championship.

- 147, 137, 129, 119, 103, 100 – Chang Bingyu
- 146, 137, 131, 116 – Oliver Sykes
- 143, 140, 134, 118, 109, 108, 106, 105 – Zhang Anda
- 143, 117, 111, 104 – Wang Xinbo
- 142, 138, 101, 101 – Jiang Jun
- 142, 106, 106, 105 – Ali Carter
- 142 – Alfie Burden
- 141, 126, 119, 117, 103, 101 – David Gilbert
- 140, 120, 103, 103 – Ben Mertens
- 139 – Duane Jones
- 138, 112 – Jamie Clarke
- 138, 104 – He Guoqiang
- 137, 137, 111, 105, 102, 100 – Marco Fu
- 137, 133 – Aaron Hill
- 136, 136, 126 – Gary Wilson
- 136, 135, 132, 119, 114, 114, 100 – Jak Jones
- 136 – Scott Donaldson
- 135, 132, 108 – Yuan Sijun
- 135, 110 – Ashley Hugill
- 133, 108 – Robbie Williams
- 132, 114, 112 – Lan Yuhao
- 132, 107, 105, 105, 104 – Pang Junxu
- 132 – Julien Leclercq
- 131, 119 – Tom Ford
- 131, 108, 105, 105, 104, 102 – Liam Pullen
- 131 – Sam Craigie
- 130, 103 – Umut Dikme
- 129, 121, 109 – Zhou Yuelong
- 129 – Mitchell Mann
- 128, 127, 113, 104, 101 – Stan Moody
- 128, 114 – Cheung Ka Wai
- 128 – Liu Hongyu
- 128 – Anthony McGill
- 127, 122, 117, 107 – Gao Yang
- 127, 119, 104, 100 – Fan Zhengyi
- 127, 101, 100 – Noppon Saengkham
- 126, 112 – Jackson Page
- 126, 109, 104, 104 – Liam Highfield
- 126 – Ian Burns
- 125, 112 – Ryan Day
- 125 – Bulcsú Révész
- 124, 112 – Antoni Kowalski
- 123, 104 – Ashley Carty
- 123 – Liam Davies
- 122 – Hossein Vafaei
- 121, 108 – Stuart Bingham
- 121 – Louis Heathcote
- 120, 109 – Luca Brecel
- 119, 110 – Lei Peifan
- 119, 105 – Connor Benzey
- 118 – Chatchapong Nasa
- 117, 101 – Elliot Slessor
- 116 – Ken Doherty
- 115 – Zhao Hanyang
- 114, 108, 106 – Long Zehuang
- 114, 106, 104, 100, 100 – Xu Si
- 114 – Michał Szubarczyk
- 113 – Liam Graham
- 113 – Thepchaiya Un-Nooh
- 109 – Ishpreet Singh Chadha
- 109 – Daniel Womersley
- 108, 101 – Bai Yulu
- 108 – Michael Holt
- 108 – Jack Lisowski
- 108 – Xu Yichen
- 107 – Joe O'Connor
- 106, 100 – Peter Lines
- 104 – Mateusz Baranowski
- 103 – Dylan Emery
- 103 – Steven Hallworth
- 103 – Artemijs Žižins
- 102 – Patrick Whelan
- 101 – Mark Davis
- 101 – Ricky Walden
- 100 – Jordan Brown
- 100 – Jimmy Robertson
- 100 – Daniel Wells
