= 2027 German Masters =

Snooker tournament

2027 Machineseeker German Masters

Tournament information
- Dates: 25–31 January 2027
- Venue: Tempodrom
- City: Berlin
- Country: Germany
- Organisation: World Snooker Tour
- Format: Ranking event
- Total prize fund: £550,400
- Winner's share: £100,000
- Highest break: Jack Lisowski (ENG) (147)
- Defending champion: Judd Trump (ENG)

The 2027 German Masters (officially the 2027 Machineseeker German Masters) is an upcoming professional snooker tournament that will take place from 25 to 31 January 2027 at the Tempodrom in Berlin, Germany. Qualifying took place from 16 to 19 November at the Robin Park Centre in Wigan, England. The 17th consecutive edition of the German Masters since it was revived in 2011, it will be the 12th ranking event of the 2026–27 snooker season, following the 2026 Scottish Open and preceding the 2027 Welsh Open.

Judd Trump is the defending champion, having defeated Shaun Murphy 10–4 in the 2026 final.

== Overview ==
The tournament originated as the German Open, a ranking event that was held from 1995 to 1997. The inaugural German Open champion was John Higgins, who defeated Ken Doherty 9–3 in the 1995 final. After being staged once in 1998 as the non-ranking German Masters, the tournament dropped off the calendar; it was restored in 2011 as the ranking German Masters. The first winner of the tournament after its revival was Mark Williams, who defeated Mark Selby 9–7 in the 2011 final. In 2021, the tournament trophy was named the Brandon Parker Trophy in memory of the late manager, promoter, and World Snooker Tour director who first brought the tournament to Berlin's Tempodrom in 2011. Parker had died from cancer in 2020.

The 2027 edition of the tournament—its 17th consecutive staging since its revival in 2011—will take place from 26 January to 1 February at the Tempodrom in Berlin, Germany. Qualifying took place from 16 to 19 November at the Robin Park Centre in Wigan, England. It will be the 12th ranking event of the 2026–27 snooker season, following the 2026 Scottish Open and preceding the 2027 Welsh Open. Judd Trump is the defending champion, having defeated Shaun Murphy 10–4 in the 2026 final.

=== Prize fund ===
The prize fund for the tournament is detailed below.

- Winner: £100,000
- Runner-up: £45,000
- Semi-final: £21,000
- Quarter-final: £13,200
- Last 16: £9,000
- Last 32: £5,400
- Last 64: £3,600
- Last 96: £1,000
- Highest break: £5,000
- Total: £550,400

== Summary ==
=== Qualifying ===
==== Round 1 ====
Reanne Evans beat Fergal Quinn 5–3.

==== Round 2 ====
Stan Moody whitewashed Sean O'Sullivan, and 64-year-old Jimmy White defeated Matthew Selt 5–4.

==== Round 3 ====
Stephen Maguire withdrew and so David Gilbert was given a walkover to the last 32.

Jack Lisowski made the second 147 of his professional career in his 5–3 win over Aaron Hill. It was the 248th official maximum.

White continued his good run by defeating Pang Junxu 5–4.

== Qualifying rounds ==
The results of the qualifying rounds are shown below. Numbers in parentheses after the players' names denote the players' seeding, an "a" indicates amateur players who were not on the main World Snooker Tour, and players in bold denote match winners.

=== Round 3 (last-64) ===
==== Berlin (held-over) ====
- Judd Trump (ENG) (1) – Martin O'Donnell (ENG) (57)
- Ronnie O'Sullivan (ENG) (13) – Sam Craigie (ENG) (63)
- Mark Williams (WAL) (9) – Ricky Walden (ENG) (50)
- Kyren Wilson (ENG) (8) – Liu Hongyu (CHN) (53)
- Mark Selby (ENG) (5) – Luo Zetao (CHN) (103)
- Mark Allen (NIR) (11) – Marco Fu (HKG) (65)
- Ali Carter (ENG) (15) – Liam Pullen (ENG) (71)
- Neil Robertson (AUS) (4) – Jamie Jones (WAL) (64)
- Zhao Xintong (CHN) (3) – Craig Steadman (ENG) (122)
- Xiao Guodong (CHN) (14) – Ishpreet Singh Chadha (IND) (67)
- Barry Hawkins (ENG) (10) – Jiang Jun (CHN) (61)
- John Higgins (SCO) (6) – Cheung Ka Wai (HKG) (100)
- Shaun Murphy (ENG) (7) – Robbie Williams (ENG) (55)
- Chris Wakelin (ENG) (12) – Chatchapong Nasa (THA) (101)
- Chang Bingyu (CHN) (16) – Long Zehuang (CHN) (56)
- Wu Yize (CHN) (2) – Jamie Clarke (WAL) (93)

==== Wigan ====
- Hossein Vafaei (IRN) (30) 4–**5** **David Grace** (ENG) (73)
- Thepchaiya Un-Nooh (THA) (22) 1–**5** **Luca Brecel** (BEL) (39)
- **Si Jiahui** (CHN) (25) **5**–3 Stan Moody (ENG) (44)
- **Ding Junhui** (CHN) (23) **5**–3 Zak Surety (ENG) (43)
- **Zhou Yuelong** (CHN) (18) **5**–3 Jackson Page (WAL) (38)
- **Elliot Slessor** (ENG) (24) **5**–4 Tom Ford (ENG) (36)
- **Gary Wilson** (ENG) (28) **5**–4 Lyu Haotian (CHN) (69)
- Stephen Maguire (SCO) (31) w/d–**w/o** **David Gilbert** (ENG) (34) (Note: Stephen Maguire withdrew and so David Gilbert was given a walkover to the last 32.)
- Jak Jones (WAL) (17) 2–**5** **Anthony McGill** (SCO) (37)
- Lei Peifan (CHN) (27) 2–**5** **Daniel Wells** (WAL) (47)
- **Zhang Anda** (CHN) (21) **5**–2 Oliver Brown (ENG) (102)
- Joe O'Connor (ENG) (32) 1–**5** **Fan Zhengyi** (CHN) (45)
- **Stuart Bingham** (ENG) (20) **5**–4 Julien Leclercq (BEL) (98)
- **Jack Lisowski** (ENG) (19) **5**–3 Aaron Hill (IRL) (35)
- **Yuan Sijun** (CHN) (26) **5**–3 Leone Crowley (IRL) (89)
- Pang Junxu (CHN) (29) 4–**5** **Jimmy White** (ENG) (99)

Note: w/d=withdrawn; w/o=walkover

=== Rounds 1 and 2 ===
**Round 1 (Last 128)**; Best of 9 frames
Dylan Emery (WAL) (70)	3
**Craig Steadman (ENG) (122)**	**5**
Lan Yuhao (CHN) (80)	3
**Sean O'Sullivan (ENG) (121)**	**5**
**Ishpreet Singh Chadha (IND) (67)**	**5**
Liu Yang (CHN) (119)	1
Wang Xinbo (CHN) (82)	0
**Ashley Hugill (ENG) (108)**	**5**
Mitchell Mann (ENG) (90)	3
**Joshua Thomond (ENG) (a)**	**5**
**David Grace (ENG) (73)**	**5**
Anton Kazakov (UKR) (113)	2
Mateusz Baranowski (POL) (84)	0
**Cheung Ka Wai (HKG) (100)**	**5**
**Yao Pengcheng (CHN) (76)**	**5**
Mahmoud El Hareedy (EGY) (114)	0
**Liu Wenwei (CHN) (86)**	**5**
Alexander Ursenbacher (SUI) (106)	3
**Artemijs Žižins (LVA) (88)**	**5**
Antoni Kowalski (POL) (105)	4
**Lyu Haotian (CHN) (69)**	**5**
Panchaya Channoi (THA) (127)	1
**Reanne Evans (ENG) (87)**	**5**
Fergal Quinn (NIR) (111)	3
**Jamie Clarke (WAL) (93)**	**5**
Huang Jiahao (CHN) (97)	1
**Gao Yang (CHN) (74)**	**5**
Mina Awad (EGY) (123)	1
Florian Nüßle (AUT) (94)	3
**Chatchapong Nasa (THA) (101)**	**5**
Zhao Hanyang (CHN) (85)	1
**Michael Larkov (UKR) (125)**	**5**

**Round 2 (Last 96)**; Best of 9 frames
Scott Donaldson (SCO) (59)	4
**Craig Steadman (ENG) (122)**	**5**
**Stan Moody (ENG) (44)**	**5**
Sean O'Sullivan (ENG) (121)	0
He Guoqiang (CHN) (49)	3
**Ishpreet Singh Chadha (IND) (67)**	**5**
**Jackson Page (WAL) (38)**	**5**
Ashley Hugill (ENG) (108)	2
**Jiang Jun (CHN) (61)**	**5**
Joshua Thomond (ENG) (a)	0
Ryan Day (WAL) (42)	4
**David Grace (ENG) (73)**	**5**
Ben Woollaston (ENG) (51)	4
**Cheung Ka Wai (HKG) (100)**	**5**
**Luca Brecel (BEL) (39)**	**5**
Yao Pengcheng (CHN) (76)	2
**Tom Ford (ENG) (36)**	**5**
Liu Wenwei (CHN) (86)	1
**David Gilbert (ENG) (34)**	**5**
Artemijs Žižins (LVA) (88)	4
Michael Holt (ENG) (40)	1
**Lyu Haotian (CHN) (69)**	**5**
**Robbie Williams (ENG) (55)**	**5**
Reanne Evans (ENG) (87)	0
Oliver Lines (ENG) (54)	4
**Jamie Clarke (WAL) (93)**	**5**
**Long Zehuang (CHN) (56)**	**5**
Gao Yang (CHN) (74)	4
Ben Mertens (BEL) (62)	3
**Chatchapong Nasa (THA) (101)**	**5**
**Zak Surety (ENG) (43)**	**5**
Michael Larkov (UKR) (125)	1

**Round 1 (Last 128)**; Best of 9 frames
Gong Chenzhi (CHN) (96)	3
**Andrew Higginson (ENG) (112)**	**5**
Liam Davies (WAL) (77)	4
**Alfie Burden (ENG) (109)**	**5**
Louis Heathcote (ENG) (68)	4
**Hammad Miah (ENG) (118)**	**5**
Iulian Boiko (UKR) (72)	4
**Jimmy White (ENG) (99)**	**5**
**Ian Burns (ENG) (78)**	**5**
Paul Norris (ENG) (126)	0
Ashley Carty (ENG) (92)	1
**Oliver Brown (ENG) (102)**	**5**
**Michał Szubarczyk (POL) (81)**	**5**
Phil O'Kane (ENG) (120)	1
**Leone Crowley (IRL) (89)**	**5**
Stuart Carrington (ENG) (116)	3
**T. Tirapongpaiboon (THA) (95)**	**5**
Connor Benzey (ENG) (104)	2
**Marco Fu (HKG) (65)**	**5**
Oliver Sykes (ENG) (107)	2
Xu Yichen (CHN) (83)	2
**Luo Zetao (CHN) (103)**	**5**
Liam Graham (SCO) (91)	0
**Julien Leclercq (BEL) (98)**	**5**
Ross Muir (SCO) (79)	4
**Deng Haohui (CHN) (115)**	**5**
Jordan Brown (NIR) (66)	3
**Sahil Nayyar (CAN) (110)**	**5**
**Steven Hallworth (ENG) (75)**	**5**
Ng On-yee (HKG) (117)	3
**Liam Pullen (ENG) (71)**	**5**
Bai Yulu (CHN) (124)	0

**Round 2 (Last 96)**; Best of 9 frames
**Ricky Walden (ENG) (50)**	**5**
Andrew Higginson (ENG) (112)	4
**Liu Hongyu (CHN) (53)**	**5**
Alfie Burden (ENG) (109)	2
**Sam Craigie (ENG) (63)**	**5**
Hammad Miah (ENG) (118)	2
Matthew Selt (ENG) (48)	4
**Jimmy White (ENG) (99)**	**5**
**Aaron Hill (IRL) (35)**	**5**
Ian Burns (ENG) (78)	2
Noppon Saengkham (THA) (33)	3
**Oliver Brown (ENG) (102)**	**5**
**Martin O'Donnell (ENG) (57)**	**5**
Michał Szubarczyk (POL) (81)	2
Jimmy Robertson (ENG) (41)	3
**Leone Crowley (IRL) (89)**	**5**
**Fan Zhengyi (CHN) (45)**	**5**
T. Tirapongpaiboon (THA) (95)	3
Matthew Stevens (WAL) (52)	1
**Marco Fu (HKG) (65)**	**5**
David Lilley (ENG) (58)	4
**Luo Zetao (CHN) (103)**	**5**
Xu Si (CHN) (46)	1
**Julien Leclercq (BEL) (98)**	**5**
**Anthony McGill (SCO) (37)**	**5**
Deng Haohui (CHN) (115)	0
**Daniel Wells (WAL) (47)**	**5**
Sahil Nayyar (CAN) (110)	0
**Jamie Jones (WAL) (64)**	**5**
Steven Hallworth (ENG) (75)	1
Liam Highfield (ENG) (60)	1
**Liam Pullen (ENG) (71)**	**5**

== Century breaks ==
=== Qualifying stage centuries ===
A total of 51 century breaks were made during the qualifying stage of the tournament in Wigan.

- 147 – Jack Lisowski
- 144, 128 – Yuan Sijun
- 141 – Lan Yuhao
- 138 – Liam Pullen
- 137 – Tom Ford
- 137 – Jamie Jones
- 135, 120 – Jimmy Robertson
- 135 – Fan Zhengyi
- 135 – Michael Larkov
- 134 – Antoni Kowalski
- 134 – Florian Nüßle
- 131, 105 – Matthew Selt
- 129 – Cheung Ka Wai
- 129 – Jak Jones
- 129 – Liu Hongyu
- 129 – Hammad Miah
- 128 – Lyu Haotian
- 127 – David Grace
- 127 – Yao Pengcheng
- 126 – Steven Hallworth
- 125, 116 – Ding Junhui
- 123 – Jackson Page
- 122 – Artemijs Žižins
- 118, 118, 102 – Marco Fu
- 117 – Gao Yang
- 116, 115 – Ishpreet Singh Chadha
- 116 – Ross Muir
- 115 – Julien Leclercq
- 115 – Thanawat Tirapongpaiboon
- 112, 100 – Zhang Anda
- 112 – Sam Craigie
- 112 – Liam Davies
- 112 – Zak Surety
- 111 – Jiang Jun
- 105 – Robbie Williams
- 104 – Zhou Yuelong
- 103 – He Guoqiang
- 103 – Ben Woollaston
- 102, 101 – Daniel Wells
- 101 – Iulian Boiko
- 101 – Michał Szubarczyk
- 100 – Ashley Hugill
