= 2026 Wuhan Open (snooker) =

Snooker tournament

2026 Optics Valley of China Wuhan Open

Tournament information
- Dates: 23–29 August 2026
- Venue: Optics Valley Gymnasium, Huazhong University of Science and Technology
- City: Wuhan
- Country: China
- Organisation: World Snooker Tour
- Format: Ranking event
- Total prize fund: £825,000
- Winner's share: £175,000
- Highest break: Artemijs Žižins (LVA) (145)

Final
- Champion: Chang Bingyu (CHN)
- Runner-up: Zhao Xintong (CHN)
- Score: 10–7

The 2026 Wuhan Open (officially the 2026 Optics Valley of China Wuhan Open) was a professional snooker tournament that took place from 23 to 29 August 2026 at the Optics Valley Gymnasium, Huazhong University of Science and Technology in Wuhan, China. The qualifiers took place from 15 to 18 June at the Leicester Arena in Leicester, England. The fourth consecutive edition of the tournament since it was first staged in 2023, it was the third ranking event of the 2026–27 snooker season, following the 2026 China Open and preceding the 2026 British Open.

Xiao Guodong was the two-time defending champion, having defeated Gary Wilson 10–9 in the 2025 final, and beating Si Jiahui 10–7 in the 2024 final, but he was beaten 2–6 by Zhao Xintong in the semi-finals.

Chang Bingyu won the tournament, beating Zhao 10–7 in the final.

== Overview ==
The tournament was the fourth consecutive edition of the Wuhan Open, which was first held in 2023. The inaugural champion was Judd Trump, who won the 2023 event with a 10–7 victory over Ali Carter. The defending champion was Xiao Guodong, who defended his 2024 title by defeating Gary Wilson 10–9 in the 2025 final, but he was beaten 2–6 by Zhao Xintong in the semi-finals.

The main stage of the event took place from 23 to 29 August 2026 in Wuhan, China. Qualifiers were held from 15 to 18 June at the Leicester Arena in Leicester, England. The tournament was the third ranking event of the 2026–27 snooker season, following the 2026 China Open and preceding the 2026 British Open.

There were 95 century breaks made in the tournament, with 59 made at the qualifying stage, and 36 at the main stage. The highest break was a 145, made by Artemijs Žižins during qualification, and the highest break at the main stage was a 140 by the eventual winner Chang Bingyu.

=== Format ===
In a change to previous editions, the flat-draw format – which saw everyone starting in the last 128, with some matches held over to the final venue – has been replaced with multiple rounds of qualifying in a tiered format similar to formats used in the Home Nations Series and the German Masters. Two rounds of qualifying were played between players ranked outside the top 32 of the world ranking. Four matches involving Chinese wildcards (Chen Qi'en, Guan Zhen, Tang Hewen, and Wang Xinzhong) in the second round of qualifying were held over to the main venue in Wuhan. The third round (the last 64) was split into two halves: matches involving the top 16 seeds, as determined from the start of season ranking list, were held over to the final venue, with players seeded 17–32 playing their match as part of the qualifiers in Leicester. All matches were played as the best of 9 frames until the semi-finals, which were the best of 11 frames. The final was a best of 19 frames match, played over two sessions.

=== Prize fund ===
The winner received £175,000 from a total prize fund of £825,000. The breakdown of prize money is shown below:

- Winner: £175,000
- Runner-up: £75,000
- Semi-finalists: £33,000
- Quarter-finalists: £22,000
- Last 16: £12,000
- Last 32: £8,000
- Last 64: £4,500
- Last 96: £1,500
- Highest break (qualifying stage included): £5,000
- Total: £825,000

== Summary ==
=== Held-over qualifying matches ===
Mark Allen, Oliver Brown, Robbie Williams, and John Higgins withdrew and so Michael Holt, Kyren Wilson, Mark Williams, and Liu Hongyu were given walkovers to the last 32 respectively.

Hammad Miah failed to arrive for his match against Chen Qi'en and so Chen was awarded the match. Chris Wakelin whitewashed Jordan Brown, defending champion Xiao Guodong whitewashed Wang Xinbo, Judd Trump beat Florian Nüßle, also by a whitewash, and Liam Davies defeated Ding Junhui 5–1. Neil Robertson beat Ben Mertens 5–1, Ronnie O'Sullivan defeated Ashley Carty 5–2, Barry Hawkins beat Chen Qi'en, also by 5–2, and Si Jiahui beat Jiang Jun 5–3. Zhao Xintong whitewashed Gao Yang, and Shaun Murphy beat Alfie Burden, also by a whitewash. Artemijs Žižins defeated Wu Yize 5–4, and Mark Selby beat Fan Zhengyi 5–2.

=== Last 32 ===
Steven Hallworth withdrew and so Chris Wakelin was given a walkover to the last 16.

Trump whitewashed Yuan Sijun, Davies beat Gary Wilson 5–3, Xiao defeated Jackson Page 5–2, and Williams beat David Gilbert 5–3. Chang Bingyu beat Liu 5–1, Ali Carter defeated Kyren Wilson 5–4, and Pang Junxu beat Murphy 5–3. O'Sullivan defeated Yao Pengcheng 5–1, and Si beat Dylan Emery, also by 5–1. Robertson beat Hossein Vafaei 5–3, and Stephen Maguire defeated Žižins 5–4. Zhao beat Jak Jones 5–2, Daniel Wells whitewashed Holt, Selby beat He Guoqiang 5–2, and Hawkins defeated Ryan Day 5–3.

=== Last 16 ===
The last 16 matches were played on 26 August.

Chang beat Carter 5–2, O'Sullivan defeated Maguire, also by 5–2, Trump beat Si 5–1, and Selby defeated Pang 5–4. Williams beat Wells 5–2, Xiao defeated Wakelin 5–3, Zhao beat Hawkins 5–2, and Robertson defeated Davies 5–3.

=== Quarter-finals ===
The quarter-finals were played on 27 August.

Chang beat Trump 5–1 making a 132 break in the sixth frame, and O'Sullivan defeated Selby 5–3 making a 129 break in the eighth frame. Zhao beat Robertson 5–1 becoming the new world number one, and defending champion Xiao defeated Williams 5–3.

=== Semi-finals ===
The semi-finals were played on 28 August as the best of 11 frames.

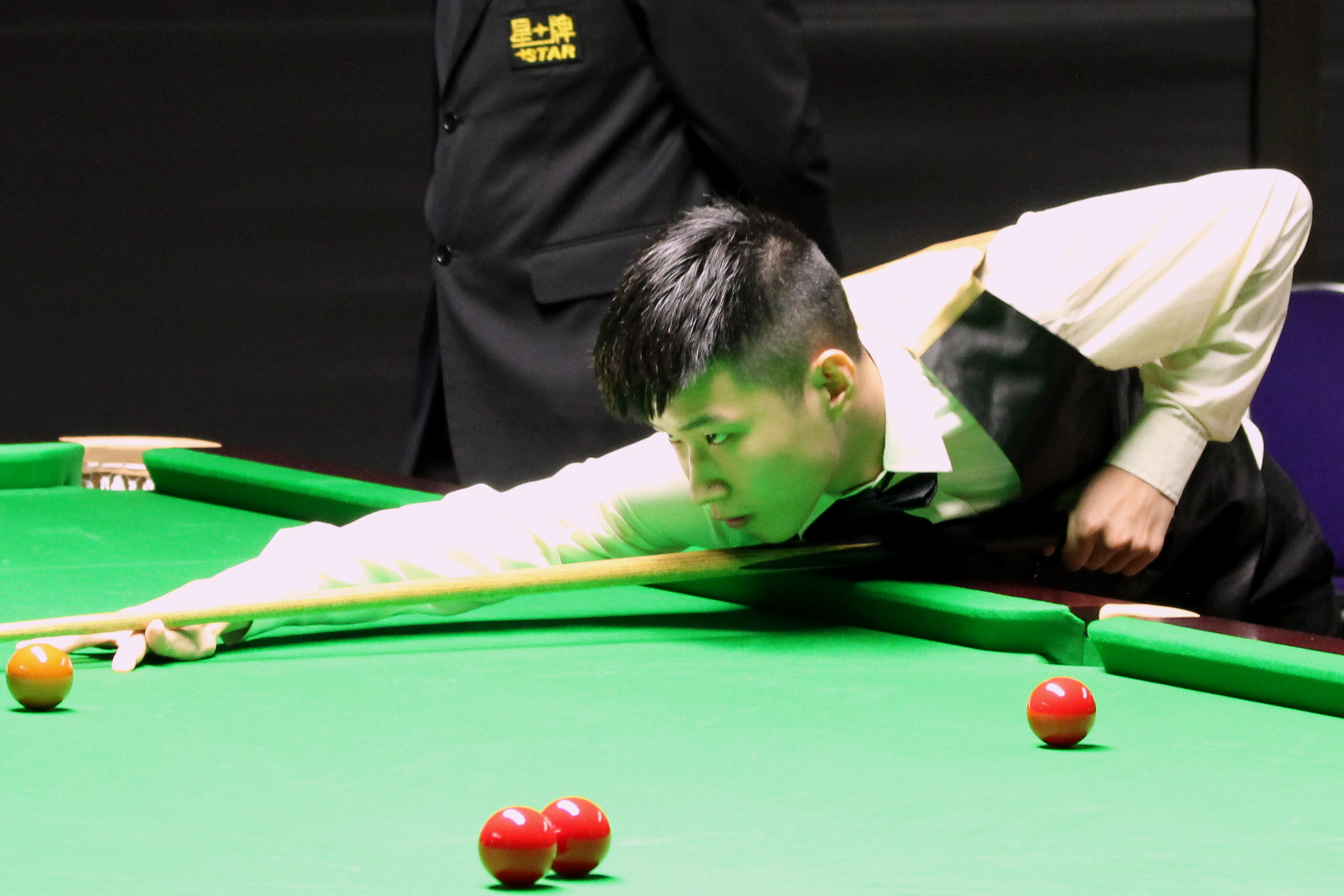
Zhao Xintong (pictured in 2016) beat defending champion Xiao Guodong in the semi-finals.

Chang beat O'Sullivan 6–3. After the match Chang said: "Every time I play against Ronnie [O'Sullivan], it's a pleasure. He probably wasn't in the best form today, and I managed to take some of the opportunities that came my way. I think my safety play was probably better right from the start today, and I could clearly feel that my safety game was much better than it had been before." O'Sullivan said: "The disease came back big time today. If I'm honest I don't think I will ever get over it. I will see out the next 18 months and see how we go. I don't want to throw the towel in just yet. I've committed to playing until then. I want to give myself a chance. I'd hate to finish my career on performances like that."

Zhao beat defending champion Xiao 6–2, making a 124 break in the eighth frame. After the match Zhao said: "To be honest, I had quite a bit of luck today. Neither Xiao [Guodong] nor I played particularly well. I adjusted quicker than he did, so I was able to take my chances and win the match. It was just one match, and I don't think winning it proves anything. Since I was ten years old, becoming world number one was my target. It is really hard, but I've done it. I don't want it just to be a few days, I want it to be longer. I need to learn from the likes of Mark Selby, Judd Trump and Ronnie O'Sullivan." Xiao said:"There are no regrets. I think the way Zhao [Xintong] is playing now is at world number one level. I did my best, but there was still nothing I could do"

=== Final ===
The final was played on 29 August as the best of 19 frames, played over two sessions.

At the end of the afternoon session, Chang led Zhao 5–4. Chang went on to win his first ranking title 10–7. After the match Chang said: "Before the match, I honestly didn't think I could beat him [Zhao Xintong]. He is the new world number one after all, so I just wanted to learn from him. I've watched a lot of his matches over the past few years and learned a great deal from him. So I went into the final with the same attitude of learning." Zhao said: "Although I'm a little disappointed with the result today, I think for me personally it’s just one match. I can't be in finals forever or win every time. Of course, I didn't play particularly well today, so I think it was quite normal that Chang [Bingyu] was able to win the match. His game, and that of many of the younger Chinese players, has already reached a very high level."

== Main draw ==
The draw for the tournament is shown below. Numbers in the column to the left of the players' names denote the players' seeding, and players in bold denote match winners.

**Last 32**; Best of 9 frames
**1**	**Xiao Guodong (CHN)**	**5**
35	Jackson Page (WAL)	2
**13**	**Chris Wakelin (ENG)**	**w/o**
73 (Note: Steven Hallworth withdrew and so Chris Wakelin was given a walkover to the last 16.)	Steven Hallworth (ENG)	w/d
**45**	**Daniel Wells (WAL)**	**5**
51	Michael Holt (ENG)	0
31	David Gilbert (ENG)	3
**8**	**Mark Williams (WAL)**	**5**
**5**	**Zhao Xintong (CHN)**	**5**
32	Jak Jones (WAL)	2
**11**	**Barry Hawkins (ENG)**	**5**
37	Ryan Day (WAL)	3
24	Gary Wilson (ENG)	3
**107**	**Liam Davies (WAL)**	**5**
28	Hossein Vafaei (IRN)	3
**4**	**Neil Robertson (AUS)**	**5**
**3**	**Judd Trump (ENG)**	**5**
30	Yuan Sijun (CHN)	0
**16**	**Si Jiahui (CHN)**	**5**
72	Dylan Emery (WAL)	1
**22**	**Ali Carter (ENG)**	**5**
9	Kyren Wilson (ENG)	4
**48**	**Chang Bingyu (CHN)**	**5**
58	Liu Hongyu (CHN)	1
7	Shaun Murphy (ENG)	3
**25**	**Pang Junxu (CHN)**	**5**
**10**	**Mark Selby (ENG)**	**5**
47	He Guoqiang (CHN)	2
79	Yao Pengcheng (CHN)	1
**14**	**Ronnie O'Sullivan (ENG)**	**5**
**29**	**Stephen Maguire (SCO)**	**5**
113	Artemijs Žižins (LVA)	4

**Last 16**; Best of 9 frames
**(China) Xiao Guodong**	**5**
(England) Chris Wakelin	3
(Wales) Daniel Wells	2
**(Wales) Mark Williams**	**5**
**(China) Zhao Xintong**	**5**
(England) Barry Hawkins	2
(Wales) Liam Davies	3
**(Australia) Neil Robertson**	**5**
**(England) Judd Trump**	**5**
(China) Si Jiahui	1
(England) Ali Carter	2
**(China) Chang Bingyu**	**5**
(China) Pang Junxu	4
**(England) Mark Selby**	**5**
**(England) Ronnie O'Sullivan**	**5**
(Scotland) Stephen Maguire	2

**Quarter-finals**; Best of 9 frames
**(China) Xiao Guodong**	**5**
(Wales) Mark Williams	3
**(China) Zhao Xintong**	**5**
(Australia) Neil Robertson	1
(England) Judd Trump	1
**(China) Chang Bingyu**	**5**
(England) Mark Selby	3
**(England) Ronnie O'Sullivan**	**5**

**Semi-finals**; Best of 11 frames
(China) Xiao Guodong	2
**(China) Zhao Xintong**	**6**
**(China) Chang Bingyu**	**6**
(England) Ronnie O'Sullivan	3

**Final**; Best of 19 frames
5	(China) Zhao Xintong	7
**48**	**(China) Chang Bingyu**	**10**

Note: w/d=withdrawn; w/o=walkover

=== Final: frame scores ===
Final: Best of 19 frames. Referee: Wang Haitao; Optics Valley Gymnasium, Wuhan, China, 29 August 2026
Zhao Xintong (5); China	7–**10**	**Chang Bingyu** (48); China
Afternoon: **84**–24, **70**–9, 11–**76**, 18–**97**, **64**–55, 17–**67**, **91**–38, 8–**121**, 57–**69**; Evening: 33–**82**, 48–**74**, **74**–63, **71**–12, **74**–49, 37–**90**, 57–**74**, 64–**66**
(frame 7) **83**	Highest break	76 (frame 3)
0	Century breaks	0

== Qualifying rounds ==
=== Pre-qualifying round ===
Two pre-qualifying matches were played in Leicester to determine the opponents of Michał Szubarczyk and Oliver Brown in the qualifying draw respectively.

- **Duane Jones** (WAL) (a) **5**–3 Deng Haohui (CHN) (119)
- **Michael Larkov** (UKR) (120) **5**–3 Antoni Kowalski (POL) (106)

=== Qualifying draw ===
The results of the qualifying matches are shown below. Numbers in parentheses after the players' names denote the players' seeding, an "a" indicates amateur players who were not on the main World Snooker Tour, and players in bold denote match winners. Matches involving the top 16 seeds and the four Chinese wildcards (Chen Qi'en, Guan Zhen, Tang Hewen, and Wang Xinzhong) were held over to be played in Wuhan.

**Round 1 (Last 128)**; Best of 9 frames
Liam Graham (SCO) (87)	1
**Wang Xinbo (CHN) (112)**	**5**
Liam Highfield (ENG) (68)	4
**Gong Chenzhi (CHN) (122)**	**5**
**Jordan Brown (NIR) (64)**	**5**
Craig Steadman (ENG) (100)	4
**Steven Hallworth (ENG) (73)**	**5**
Panchaya Channoi (THA) (118)	0
Fergal Quinn (NIR) (90)	1
**Sahil Nayyar (CAN) (96)**	**5**
**Leone Crowley (IRL)**	**5**
Liu Yang (CHN) (121)	2
Michał Szubarczyk (POL) (77)	3
**Duane Jones (WAL) (a)**	**5**
**Liu Wenwei (CHN) (83)**	**5**
Jamie Clarke (WAL) (99)	3
**Gao Yang (CHN) (75)**	**5**
Bai Yulu (CHN) (108)	1
Lan Yuhao (CHN) (78)	2
**Andrew Higginson (ENG) (123)**	**5**
Lyu Haotian (CHN) (61)	4
**Hammad Miah (ENG) (102)**	**5**
Iulian Boiko (UKR) (71)	4
**Mitchell Mann (ENG) (124)**	**5**
Jamie Jones (WAL) (63)	2
**Luo Zetao (CHN) (117)**	**5**
Liam Pullen (ENG) (66)	3
**Liam Davies (WAL) (107)**	**5**
**Zhao Hanyang (CHN) (81)**	**5**
Stuart Carrington (ENG) (125)	4
**Ben Mertens (BEL) (62)**	**5**
Ashley Hugill (ENG) (105)	1
David Grace (ENG) (74)	2
**Florian Nüßle (AUT) (93)**	**5**
**Louis Heathcote (ENG) (67)**	**5**
Paul Norris (ENG) (116)	1
**Jiang Jun (CHN) (65)**	**5**
Jimmy White (ENG)	3
**Dylan Emery (WAL) (72)**	**5**
Ng On-yee (HKG) (95)	2
**Sam Craigie (ENG) (70)**	**5**
Julien Leclercq (BEL) (109)	3
**Oliver Brown (ENG) (92)**	**5**
Michael Larkov (UKR) (120)	2
Alexander Ursenbacher (SUI) (89)	1
**Huang Jiahao (CHN) (104)**	**5**
Chatchapong Nasa (THA) (91)	3
**Phil O'Kane (ENG) (115)**	**5**
Connor Benzey (ENG) (88)	3
**Alfie Burden (ENG) (98)**	**5**
Ross Muir (SCO) (84)	3
**Oliver Sykes (ENG) (111)**	**5**
Marco Fu (HKG) (69)	4
**Anton Kazakov (UKR) (110)**	**5**
Mateusz Baranowski (POL) (85)	2
**Sean O'Sullivan (ENG) (101)**	**5**
**Yao Pengcheng (CHN) (79)**	**5**
Thanawat Tirapongpaiboon (THA) (114)	2
Ian Burns (ENG) (76)	2
**Ashley Carty (ENG) (103)**	**5**
Xu Yichen (CHN) (80)	3
**Mahmoud El Hareedy (EGY) (97)**	**5**
Reanne Evans (ENG) (82)	2
**Artemijs Žižins (LVA) (113)**	**5**

**Round 2 (Last 96)**; Best of 9 frames
Scott Donaldson (SCO) (55)	1
**Wang Xinbo (CHN) (112)**	**5**
**Jackson Page (WAL) (35)**	**5**
Gong Chenzhi (CHN) (122)	2
Oliver Lines (ENG) (53)	3
**Jordan Brown (NIR) (64)**	**5**
Luca Brecel (BEL) (44)	1
**Steven Hallworth (ENG) (73)**	**5**
**Daniel Wells (WAL) (45)**	**5**
Sahil Nayyar (CAN) (96)	1
**Michael Holt (ENG) (51)**	**5**
Leone Crowley (IRL)	2
**Noppon Saengkham (THA) (46)**	**5**
Duane Jones (WAL) (a)	2
**Robbie Williams (ENG) (56)**	**5**
Liu Wenwei (CHN) (83)	1
Guan Zhen (CHN) (a)^{†}	4
**Gao Yang (CHN) (75)**	**5**
**Matthew Selt (ENG) (43)**	**5**
Andrew Higginson (ENG) (123)	1
**Chen Qi'en** (CHN) (a)^{†}	**w/o**
Hammad Miah (ENG) (102) (Note: Hammad Miah failed to arrive for his match against Chen Qi'en and so Chen was awarded the match.)	n/s
**Ryan Day (WAL) (37)**	**5**
Mitchell Mann (ENG) (124)	1
**Aaron Hill (IRL) (41)**	**5**
Luo Zetao (CHN) (117)	0
Martin O'Donnell (ENG) (52)	1
**Liam Davies (WAL) (107)**	**5**
**Ben Woollaston (ENG) (39)**	**5**
Zhao Hanyang (CHN) (81)	2
Wang Xinzhong (CHN) (a)^{†}	3
**Ben Mertens (BEL) (62)**	**5**
Ricky Walden (ENG) (54)	3
**Florian Nüßle (AUT) (93)**	**5**
Anthony McGill (SCO) (38)	2
**Louis Heathcote (ENG) (67)**	**5**
Tang Hewen (CHN) (a)^{†}	2
**Jiang Jun (CHN) (65)**	**5**
Xu Si (CHN) (34)	3
**Dylan Emery (WAL) (72)**	**5**
**Tom Ford (ENG) (36)**	**5**
Sam Craigie (ENG) (70)	2
Ishpreet Singh Chadha (IND) (59)	3
**Oliver Brown (ENG) (92)**	**5**
**Chang Bingyu (CHN) (48)**	**5**
Huang Jiahao (CHN) (104)	2
**Liu Hongyu (CHN) (58)**	**5**
Phil O'Kane (ENG) (115)	2
Long Zehuang (CHN) (50)	4
**Alfie Burden (ENG) (98)**	**5**
Zak Surety (ENG) (42)	3
**Oliver Sykes (ENG) (111)**	**5**
**Fan Zhengyi (CHN) (57)**	**5**
Anton Kazakov (UKR) (110)	3
**He Guoqiang (CHN) (47)**	**5**
Sean O'Sullivan (ENG) (101)	2
Jimmy Robertson (ENG) (33)	4
**Yao Pengcheng (CHN) (79)**	**5**
Matthew Stevens (WAL) (49)	3
**Ashley Carty (ENG) (103)**	**5**
**Stan Moody (ENG) (40)**	**5**
Mahmoud El Hareedy (EGY) (97)	2
David Lilley (ENG) (60)	2
**Artemijs Žižins (LVA) (113)**	**5**

**Round 3 (Last 64)**; Best of 9 frames
**Xiao Guodong (CHN) (1)^{†}**	**5**
Wang Xinbo (CHN) (112)	0
Lei Peifan (CHN) (26)	3
**Jackson Page (WAL) (35)**	**5**
**Chris Wakelin (ENG) (13)^{†}**	**5**
Jordan Brown (NIR) (64)	0
Zhang Anda (CHN) (20)	4
**Steven Hallworth (ENG) (73)**	**5**
Stuart Bingham (ENG) (21)	1
**Daniel Wells (WAL) (45)**	**5**
Mark Allen (NIR) (12)^{†} (Note: Mark Allen withdrew and so Michael Holt was given a walkover to the last 32.)	w/d
**Michael Holt (ENG)** (51)	**w/o**
**David Gilbert (ENG) (31)**	**5**
Noppon Saengkham (THA) (46)	1
**Mark Williams** (WAL)(8)^{†}	**w/o**
Robbie Williams (ENG) (56) (Note: Robbie Williams withdrew and so Mark Williams was given a walkover to the last 32.)	w/d
**Zhao Xintong (CHN) (5)^{†}**	**5**
Gao Yang (CHN) (75)	0
**Jak Jones (WAL) (32)**	**5**
Matthew Selt (ENG) (43)	2
**Barry Hawkins (ENG) (11)^{†}**	**5**
Chen Qi'en (CHN) (a)	2
Elliot Slessor (ENG) (19)	1
**Ryan Day (WAL) (37)**	**5**
**Gary Wilson (ENG) (24)**	**5**
Aaron Hill (IRL) (41)	4
Ding Junhui (CHN) (15)^{†}	1
**Liam Davies (WAL) (107)**	**5**
**Hossein Vafaei (IRN) (28)**	**5**
Ben Woollaston (ENG) (39)	1
**Neil Robertson (AUS) (4)^{†}**	**5**
Ben Mertens (BEL) (62)	1
**Judd Trump (ENG) (3)^{†}**	**5**
Florian Nüßle (AUT) (93)	0
**Yuan Sijun (CHN) (30)**	**5**
Louis Heathcote (ENG) (67)	1
**Si Jiahui (CHN) (16)^{†}**	**5**
Jiang Jun (CHN) (65)	3
Thepchaiya Un-Nooh (THA) (18)	3
**Dylan Emery (WAL) (72)**	**5**
**Ali Carter (ENG) (22)**	**5**
Tom Ford (ENG) (36)	3
**Kyren Wilson** (ENG) (9)^{†}	**w/o**
Oliver Brown (ENG) (92) (Note: Oliver Brown withdrew and so Kyren Wilson was given a walkover to the last 32.)	w/d
Joe O'Connor (ENG) (27)	2
**Chang Bingyu (CHN) (48)**	**5**
John Higgins (SCO) (6)^{†} (Note: John Higgins withdrew and so Liu Hongyu was given a walkover to the last 32.)	w/d
**Liu Hongyu** (CHN) (58)	**w/o**
**Shaun Murphy (ENG) (7)^{†}**	**5**
Alfie Burden (ENG) (98)	0
**Pang Junxu (CHN) (25)**	**5**
Oliver Sykes (ENG) (111)	3
**Mark Selby (ENG) (10)^{†}**	**5**
Fan Zhengyi (CHN) (57)	2
Zhou Yuelong (CHN) (23)	2
**He Guoqiang (CHN) (47)**	**5**
Jack Lisowski (ENG) (17)	0
**Yao Pengcheng (CHN) (79)**	**5**
**Ronnie O'Sullivan (ENG) (14)^{†}**	**5**
Ashley Carty (ENG) (103)	2
**Stephen Maguire (SCO) (29)**	**5**
Stan Moody (ENG) (40)	2
Wu Yize (CHN) (2)^{†}	4
**Artemijs Žižins (LVA) (113)**	**5**

Note: ^{†} Match held-over to the main venue in Wuhan.
Note: w/d=withdrawn; n/s=no-show; w/o=walkover

== Century breaks ==
=== Main stage centuries ===
A total of 36 century breaks were made during the main stage of the tournament in Wuhan.

- 140, 132, 110, 109 – Chang Bingyu
- 134 – Mark Selby
- 134 – Mark Williams
- 132 – Ali Carter
- 131 – Chen Qi'en
- 129, 110, 109, 106 – Ronnie O'Sullivan
- 129 – Wu Yize
- 128, 124, 121, 117, 113, 106 – Zhao Xintong
- 125 – Xiao Guodong
- 123 – Ding Junhui
- 123 – Si Jiahui
- 118 – Judd Trump
- 118 – Gary Wilson
- 115 – Artemijs Žižins
- 113 – Liam Davies
- 112, 100, 100 – Neil Robertson
- 112 – Kyren Wilson
- 110, 102 – Chris Wakelin
- 106 – Stephen Maguire
- 106 – Wang Xinzhong
- 103 – He Guoqiang
- 102 – Pang Junxu

=== Qualifying stage centuries ===
A total of 59 century breaks were made during the qualifying stage of the tournament in Leicester.

- 145, 136, 136, 117 – Artemijs Žižins
- 143 – Matthew Stevens
- 140 – Long Zehuang
- 139 – Joe O'Connor
- 138, 108 – Chang Bingyu
- 137, 116 – Ryan Day
- 136 – David Gilbert
- 134, 112 – Lyu Haotian
- 133, 127 – Tom Ford
- 131, 108, 106, 106 – Yao Pengcheng
- 131, 105 – Sam Craigie
- 130 – Liam Highfield
- 128 – Hossein Vafaei
- 127 – Liu Hongyu
- 126, 104, 102 – Dylan Emery
- 122, 102, 100 – Aaron Hill
- 120 – He Guoqiang
- 117, 100 – Daniel Wells
- 115 – Anton Kazakov
- 115 – Jimmy White
- 113, 101 – Gong Chenzhi
- 113 – Iulian Boiko
- 108 – Alfie Burden
- 107, 104 – Mahmoud El Hareedy
- 107 – Noppon Saengkham
- 105 – Jak Jones
- 105 – Yuan Sijun
- 105 – Zhou Yuelong
- 104, 103 – Pang Junxu
- 104 – Liam Davies
- 104 – Duane Jones
- 104 – Luo Zetao
- 103 – Xu Yichen
- 102 – Mateusz Baranowski
- 102 – Jiang Jun
- 102 – Thepchaiya Un-Nooh
- 101 – Zhang Anda
- 100 – Gao Yang
- 100 – Steven Hallworth
- 100 – Ben Mertens
