= 2026 China Open (snooker) =

Snooker tournament

2026 Satuo China Open

Tournament information
- Dates: 8–16 August 2026
- Venue: Riverside Sports Centre
- City: Taiyuan
- Country: China
- Organisation: World Snooker Tour; CBSA
- Format: Ranking event
- Total prize fund: £1,205,000
- Winner's share: £250,000
- Highest break: Michael Holt (ENG) (147)

Final
- Champion: Mark Selby (ENG)
- Runner-up: Noppon Saengkham (THA)
- Score: 10–6

The 2026 China Open (officially the 2026 Satuo China Open) was a professional snooker tournament that took place from 8 to 16 August 2026 at the Riverside Sports Centre in Taiyuan, China. Qualifying took place from 10 to 14 June at the Leicester Arena in Leicester, England. The first edition of the revived China Open after it was cancelled because of the COVID-19 pandemic, it was the second ranking event of the 2026–27 snooker season, following the 2026 Championship League and preceding the 2026 Wuhan Open. The winner received £250,000 from a total prize fund of £1,205,000.

Neil Robertson was the defending champion, having defeated Jack Lisowski 11–4 in the 2019 final, but he was beaten 1–6 by Mark Selby in the quarter-finals.

Selby won the tournament, defeating Noppon Saengkham 10–6 in the final.

== Overview ==
The first non-ranking China Masters was held in 1985. Steve Davis won the inaugural edition, defeating Dennis Taylor 2–1 in the final. The first major international tournament played in the Asian country was the China International, held as a non-ranking event in 1997 and as a ranking event in March 1999. It was renamed the China Open for the December 1999 edition, which Ronnie O'Sullivan won by beating Stephen Lee 9–2 in the final. It was staged 18 times as a ranking event until it was discontinued due to the COVID-19 pandemic. As of the 2019 edition, the last one to be played before its discontinuation, Mark Selby and Mark Williams were the most successful players, each having won the tournament three times.

The 2026 edition of the tournament was held from 8 to 16 August at the Riverside Sports Centre in Taiyuan, China. Qualifying took place from 10 to 14 June at the Leicester Arena in Leicester, England. It was the second ranking event of the 2026–27 snooker season, following the 2026 Championship League and preceding the 2026 Wuhan Open. Neil Robertson was the defending champion, having defeated Jack Lisowski 11–4 in the 2019 final, but he was beaten 1–6 by Mark Selby in the quarter-finals.

The opening ceremony was held in Taiyuan on 7 August. At the ceremony the chairman of the World Professional Billiards and Snooker Association, Jason Ferguson said: "Today marks a significant moment for our sport as we celebrate the return of one of snooker's most prestigious and historic tournaments. After a six-year absence, the China Open once again takes its rightful place on the World Snooker Tour calendar, reaffirming its status as the flagship snooker event in China and one of the highlights of our international season." China Open promoter Jay Wang noted the tournament's successful return.

There were 120 century breaks made during the event, with 80 made during the qualification stage, and 40 at the main stage, including a maximum break made by Michael Holt during qualifying.

=== Format ===
The revived edition followed a structure similar to that of the UK Championship and the World Championship. 144 players were entered into the tournament, including Chinese wildcards as well as top-up amateurs from the Q School Order of Merit. The top 16 ranked players were seeded through to the final rounds in Taiyuan, while all other players needed to play between 2 and 4 rounds of qualifying in Leicester in order to qualify for the main stage, depending on their seeding.

All matches up to and including the semi-finals were the best of 11 frames, while the final was a best-of-19 frames match played over two sessions.

=== Prize fund ===
The winner received £250,000 from a total prize fund of £1,205,000. The breakdown of prize money is shown below:

- Winner: £250,000
- Runner-up: £100,000
- Semi-finalists: £50,000
- Quarter-finalists: £25,000
- Last 16: £15,000
- Last 32: £10,000
- Last 48: £7,500
- Last 80: £5,000
- Last 112: £2,500
- Highest break (qualifying stage included): £15,000
- Total: £1,205,000

== Summary ==
=== Qualifying rounds ===
==== Qualifying round 2 ====
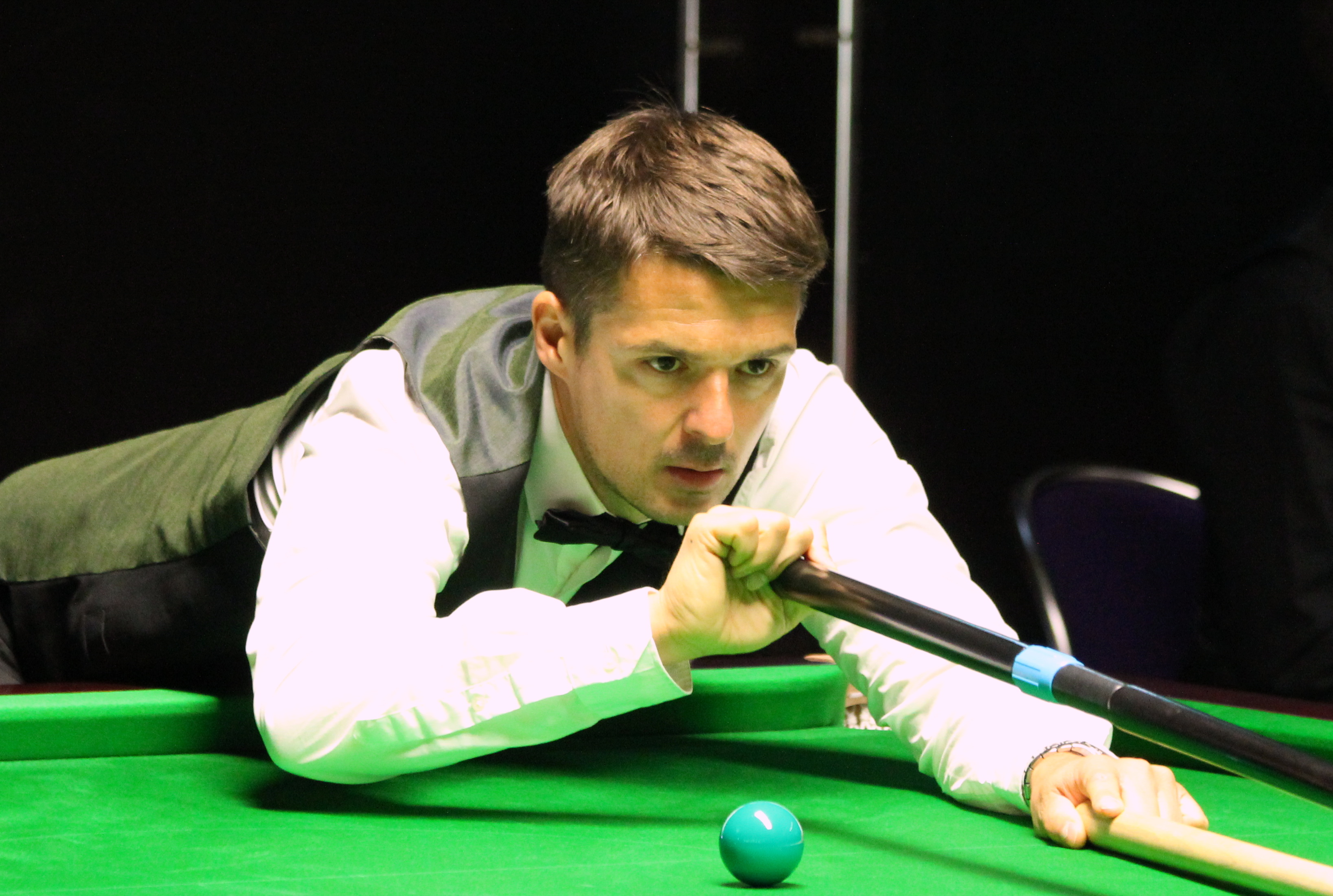
Michael Holt (pictured in 2016) made the first maximum break of his professional career in his 6–1 win over Mark Joyce.

Michael Holt made the first maximum break of his professional career in his 6–1 win over Mark Joyce. It was the first 147 of the 2026–27 season and the 242nd official maximum.

==== Qualifying round 3 ====
Xu Si missed the last black in a maximum attempt in the seventh and final frame of his match against Jamie Jones which he won 6–1.

==== Qualifying round 4 ====
Tom Ford beat Liam Highfield 6–5, coming back from 0–5 down. The final frame was decided on the final black.

=== Later rounds ===
==== Last 32 ====
David Gilbert beat Ding Junhui 6–1, and Wu Yize defeated Yao Pengcheng 6–5. Zhou Yuelong beat Mark Williams 6–3, and Liu Hongyu defeated Barry Hawkins 6–4. Xiao Guodong beat Anthony McGill 6–3, and Noppon Saengkham defeated Judd Trump by the same score. Shaun Murphy whitewashed Matthew Selt with century breaks of 132, 103, 139, and 113. With 607 unanswered points, this breaks the record for a professional match, beating the previous record of 556, set by Ronnie O'Sullivan at the 2014 Masters. O'Sullivan beat Jackson Page 6–2.

Si Jiahui whitewashed Jiang Jun, and defending champion Neil Robertson defeated Chang Bingyu 6–3. Mark Selby beat Pang Junxu 6–3, and Kyren Wilson defeated Aaron Hill 6–5. Mark Allen withdrew and so Hossein Vafaei was given a walkover to the last 16. Stuart Bingham beat John Higgins 6–4, making a high break of 140. Chris Wakelin beat Tom Ford 6–4, and Zhang Anda beat Zhao Xintong 6–5 on a re-spotted black in the final frame.

==== Last 16 ====
The last 16 matches were played on 12 and 13 August.

Gilbert beat Wu 6–2, and Zhou defeated Liu 6–4 making four century breaks of 119, 108, 134, and 140. Saengkham beat O'Sullivan 6–4, and Murphy defeated Xiao 6–2.

Bingham whitewashed Vafaei, and defending champion Robertson beat Si 6–2. Selby beat Wilson 6–1, and Zhang defeated Wakelin 6–4.

==== Quarter-finals ====
The quarter-finals were played on 14 August.

Saengkham beat Murphy 6–4, and Zhou defeated Gilbert 6–5. Selby beat defending champion Robertson 6–1, and Bingham defeated Zhang 6–3.

==== Semi-finals ====
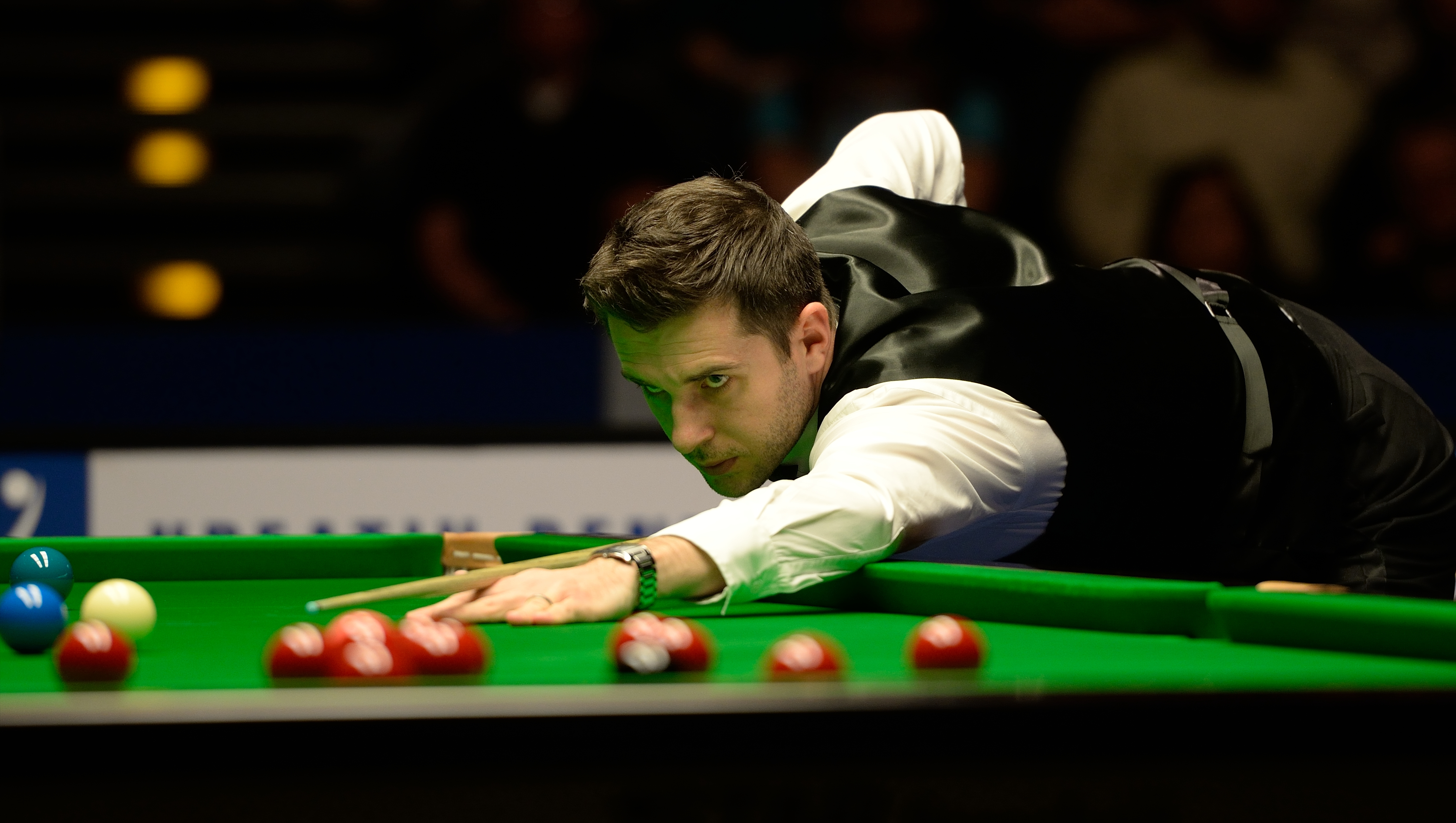
Mark Selby (pictured in 2015) beat Stuart Bingham 6–2 in the second semi-final.

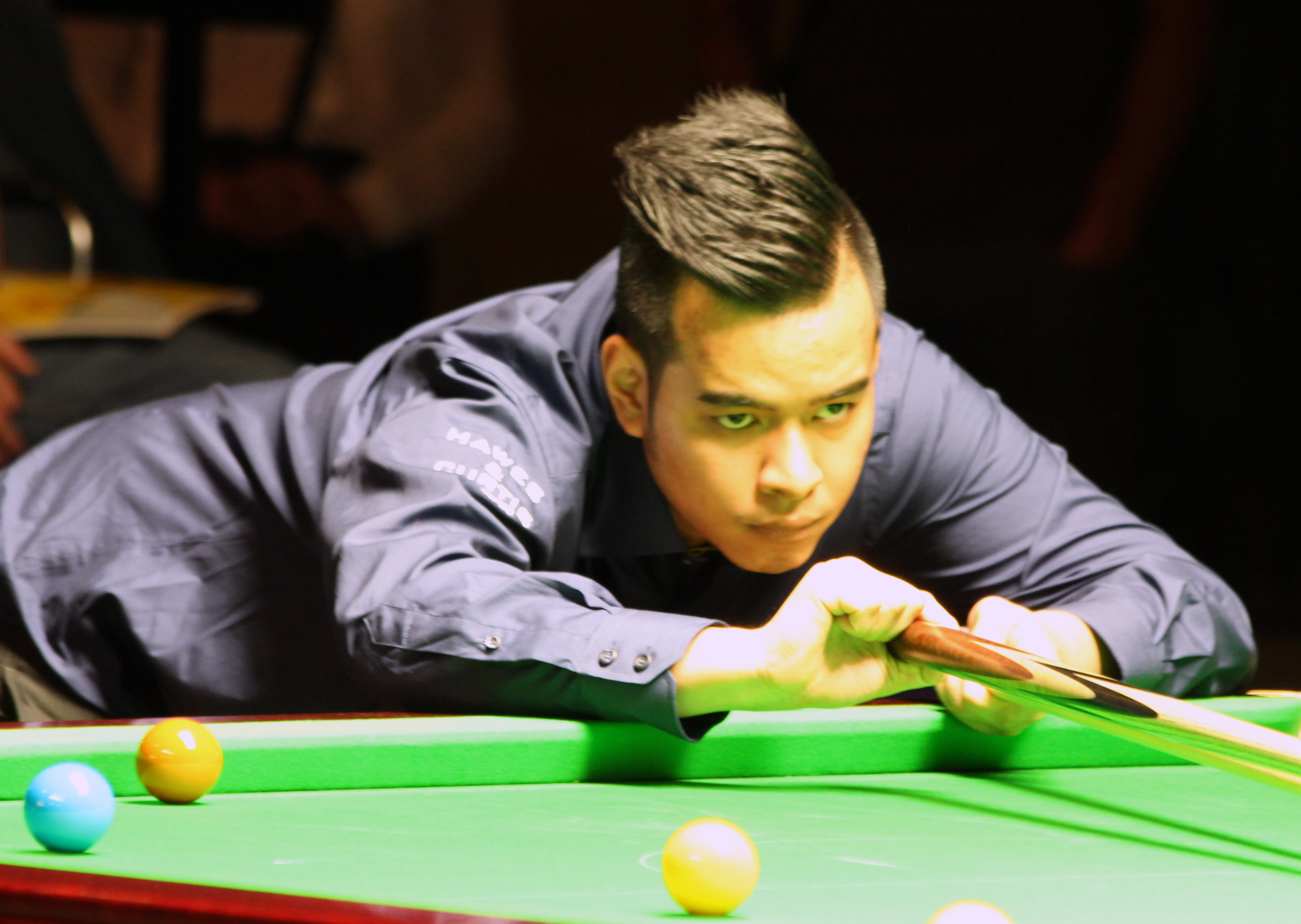
Noppon Saengkham (pictured in 2015) beat Zhou Yuelong 6–5 in the first semi-final.

The semi-finals were played on 15 August.

Saengkham beat Zhou 6–5, making a 134 total clearance in the deciding frame to reach his second ranking final, having lost to Gary Wilson in the final of the 2023 Scottish Open. After the match Saengkham said: "Last night I couldn't sleep, I went to sleep at 6am and woke up at 10am. I was thinking about everything, at 5–5 I still believed I could do it, I just wanted one chance. From 5–3 I didn't make many mistakes. I told myself that if I had one chance I had to go for it. You need a big heart if you want to win big."

Selby beat Bingham 6–2 to reach his 39th ranking final. After the match Selby said: "I played OK tonight, not as good as yesterday but I didn't do a lot wrong, Stuart [Bingham] looked good up until 2–2, then after that the bits of run didn't go his way. I seem to be punishing my opponent's mistakes and you need to do that to compete for tournaments. I have hit the ball well and felt good on the practice table all week, and trusted myself out there. Noppon [Saengkham] is in the final for a reason, he's playing very well and he's beaten Judd [Trump], Ronnie [O'Sullivan], Shaun Murphy and Zhou Yuelong. It will be tough. I played him the World Championship in 2020 and beat him 13–12, he played unbelievably well over three sessions so I am expecting something similar to that. I'll give it my all as I do in every match. It's great to be back in a final here in China."

==== Final ====
The final was played on 16 August as the best of 19 frames, played over two sessions.

At the end of the afternoon session the score was tied at 4–4. Selby went on to win the match, and the tournament 10–6, for his 26th ranking win and his fourth China Open title. After the match Selby said: "I'm very happy to be standing here as champion, I felt I played some really good stuff all week, Noppon [Saengkham] played well in the first session and I was fortunate to pinch the last two frames and finish 4–4, I was over the moon with that scoreline because Noppon probably felt he deserved to be ahead." Saengkham said: "Mark [Selby] was very strong today and controlled the game very well, his safety game was so good. When I was 4–2 up he was under pressure but in the evening the game changed and it looked like Mark was controlling everything. I am very happy with the way I played during the tournament and to be here until the end. I will keep trying hard and hopefully one day I will be the champion."

== Main stages ==
=== Wildcard round ===
A wildcard round—also known as the last 34—was held prior to the last 32, in which two qualifiers from the qualifying rounds were randomly drawn against two Chinese wildcard players. The winner of each wildcard match progressed to the last 32 to play a top 16 seed. The results for these wildcard round matches are below:

Match	Qualifier	Score	Wildcard player
WC1	**Hossein Vafaei** (IRN) (28)	**6**–0	Liu Linhao (CHN)
WC2	**Anthony McGill** (SCO) (38)	**6**–0	Wu Shengguang (CHN)

=== Main draw ===
The results of the main draw are shown below. Numbers in the column to the left of the players' names denote the players' seeding and players in bold denote match winners.

**Round 1 (Last 32)**; Best of 11 frames
**1**	**Neil Robertson (AUS)**	**6**
48	Chang Bingyu (CHN)	3
**16**	**Si Jiahui (CHN)**	**6**
65	Jiang Jun (CHN)	0
**9**	**Mark Selby (ENG)**	**6**
25	Pang Junxu (CHN)	3
**8**	**Kyren Wilson (ENG)**	**6**
41	Aaron Hill (IRL)	5
5	John Higgins (SCO)	4
**21**	**Stuart Bingham (ENG)**	**6**
12 (Note: Mark Allen withdrew and so Hossein Vafaei was given a walkover to the last 16.)	Mark Allen (NIR)	w/d
**28**	**Hossein Vafaei (IRN)**	**w/o**
**13**	**Chris Wakelin (ENG)**	**6**
36	Tom Ford (ENG)	4
4	Zhao Xintong (CHN)	5
**20**	**Zhang Anda (CHN)**	**6**
3	Judd Trump (ENG)	3
**46**	**Noppon Saengkham (THA)**	**6**
**14**	**Ronnie O'Sullivan (ENG)**	**6**
35	Jackson Page (WAL)	2
**11**	**Xiao Guodong (CHN)**	**6**
38	Anthony McGill (SCO)	3
**6**	**Shaun Murphy (ENG)**	**6**
43	Matthew Selt (ENG)	0
7	Mark Williams (WAL)	3
**23**	**Zhou Yuelong (CHN)**	**6**
10	Barry Hawkins (ENG)	4
**58**	**Liu Hongyu (CHN)**	**6**
15	Ding Junhui (CHN)	1
**31**	**David Gilbert (ENG)**	**6**
**2**	**Wu Yize (CHN)**	**6**
79	Yao Pengcheng (CHN)	5

**Round 2 (Last 16)**; Best of 11 frames
**(Australia) Neil Robertson**	**6**
(China) Si Jiahui	2
**(England) Mark Selby**	**6**
(England) Kyren Wilson	1
**(England) Stuart Bingham**	**6**
(Iran) Hossein Vafaei	0
(England) Chris Wakelin	4
**(China) Zhang Anda**	**6**
**(Thailand) Noppon Saengkham**	**6**
(England) Ronnie O'Sullivan	4
(China) Xiao Guodong	2
**(England) Shaun Murphy**	**6**
**(China) Zhou Yuelong**	**6**
(China) Liu Hongyu	4
**(England) David Gilbert**	**6**
(China) Wu Yize	2

**Quarter-finals**; Best of 11 frames
(Australia) Neil Robertson	1
**(England) Mark Selby**	**6**
**(England) Stuart Bingham**	**6**
(China) Zhang Anda	3
**(Thailand) Noppon Saengkham**	**6**
(England) Shaun Murphy	4
**(China) Zhou Yuelong**	**6**
(England) David Gilbert	5

**Semi-finals**; Best of 11 frames
**(England) Mark Selby**	**6**
(England) Stuart Bingham	2
**(Thailand) Noppon Saengkham**	**6**
(China) Zhou Yuelong	5

**Final**; Best of 19 frames
**9**	**(England) Mark Selby**	**10**
46	(Thailand) Noppon Saengkham	6

Note: w/d=withdrawn; w/o=walkover

=== Final: frame scores ===
Final: Best of 19 frames. Referee: Zheng Weili; Riverside Sports Centre, Taiyuan, China, 16 August 2026
**Mark Selby** (9); England	**10**–6	Noppon Saengkham (46); Thailand
Afternoon: 8–**67**, **89**–38, **138**–0 (138), 0–**73**, 0–**80**, 5–**75**, **70**–68, **73**–32; Evening: **74**–0, **91**–37, **103**–27, **62**–29, 25–**82**, **77**–68, 1–**61**, **79**–27
(frame 3) **138**	Highest break	80 (frame 5)
**1**	Century breaks	0

== Qualifying draw ==
The results of the qualifying rounds are shown below. Numbers in parentheses denote the players' seeding and an "(a)" denotes amateur players not on the main tour. The match winners are shown in bold.

**Round 1 (Last 144)**; Best of 11 frames
**Zhao Hanyang (CHN) (81)**	**w/o**
Xu Jiarui (CHN) (a)	w/d
**Deng Haohui (CHN) (124)**	**6**
Zhou Yichen (CHN) (a)	0
**Sahil Nayyar (CAN) (96)**	**6**
Liu Yang (CHN) (126)	1
Mahmoud El Hareedy (EGY) (97)	2
**Daniel Womersley (ENG) (a)**	**6**
Bai Yulu (CHN) (112)	3
**Peter Lines (ENG) (a)**	**6**
Alexander Ursenbacher (SUI) (89)	5
**Duane Jones (WAL) (a)**	**6**
**Hammad Miah (ENG) (105)**	**6**
Mykhailo Larkov (UKR) (125)	2
Connor Benzey (ENG) (88)	3
**Huang Jiahao (CHN) (107)**	**6**
Mateusz Baranowski (POL) (85)	3
**Simon Blackwell (ENG) (a)**	**6**
Anton Kazakov (UKR) (115)	4
**Jamie Clarke (WAL) (101)**	**6**
**Oliver Brown (ENG) (92)**	**6**
Nattanapong Chaikul (THA) (a)	3
Artemijs Žižins (LAT) (118)	5
**Gong Chenzhi (CHN) (113)**	**6**
**Julien Leclercq (BEL) (114)**	**6**
Ashley Hugill (ENG) (108)	4
**Florian Nüßle (AUT) (93)**	**6**
Allan Taylor (ENG) (a)	2
**Ashley Carty (ENG) (106)**	**6**
Stuart Carrington (ENG) (102)	0
**Ross Muir (SCO) (84)**	**6**
Cheung Ka Wai (HKG) (110)	3
Liu Wenwei (CHN) (83)	1
**Oliver Sykes (ENG) (116)**	**6**
Wang Xinbo (CHN) (117)	3
**Mark Joyce (ENG) (a)**	**6**
**Jimmy White (ENG) (94)**	**6**
Sean O'Sullivan (ENG) (104)	2
**Antoni Kowalski (POL) (109)**	**6**
Paul Norris (ENG) (121)	4
**T. Tirapongpaiboon (THA) (119)**	**6**
Joshua Thomond (ENG) (a)	3
**Chatchapong Nasa (THA) (91)**	**6**
Liam Davies (WAL) (111)	5
Phil O'Kane (ENG) (120)	1
**Wang Yuhang (CHN) (a)**	**6**
Leone Crowley (IRL) (86)	4
**Andrew Higginson (ENG) (99)**	**6**
Liam Graham (SCO) (87)	5
**Mitchell Mann (ENG) (100)**	**6**
Panchaya Channoi (THA) (123)	4
**Chen Ruifu (CHN) (a)**	**6**
Fergal Quinn (NIR) (90)	3
**Zhang Yang (CHN) (a)**	**6**
**Craig Steadman (ENG) (103)**	**6**
George Pragnell (ENG) (a)	3
**Alfie Burden (ENG) (98)**	**6**
Patrick Whelan (ENG) (a)	0
Ng On-yee (HKG) (95)	4
**Ryan Thomerson (AUS) (a)**	**6**
Luo Zetao (CHN) (122)	4
**Robert Milkins (ENG) (a)**	**6**
**Reanne Evans (ENG) (82)**	**6**
Alfie Davies (WAL) (a)	4

**Round 2 (Last 112)**; Best of 11 frames
**Xu Yichen (CHN) (80)**	**6**
Zhao Hanyang (CHN) (81)	4
**Matthew Stevens (WAL) (49)**	**6**
Deng Haohui (CHN) (124)	2
**Jiang Jun (CHN) (65)**	**6**
Sahil Nayyar (CAN) (96)	1
**Jordan Brown (NIR) (64)**	**6**
Daniel Womersley (ENG) (a)	1
**Fan Zhengyi (CHN) (57)**	**6**
Peter Lines (ENG) (a)	4
**Dylan Emery (WAL) (72)**	**6**
Duane Jones (WAL) (a)	1
Robbie Williams (ENG) (56)	4
**Hammad Miah (ENG) (105)**	**6**
**Steven Hallworth (ENG) (73)**	**6**
Huang Jiahao (CHN) (107)	0
**Ian Burns (ENG) (76)**	**6**
Simon Blackwell (ENG) (a)	1
Oliver Lines (ENG) (53)	4
**Jamie Clarke (WAL) (101)**	**6**
**Marco Fu (HKG) (69)**	**6**
Oliver Brown (ENG) (92)	1
**David Lilley (ENG) (60)**	**6**
Gong Chenzhi (CHN) (113)	4
**Lyu Haotian (CHN) (61)**	**6**
Julien Leclercq (BEL) (114)	3
**Liam Highfield (ENG) (68)**	**6**
Florian Nüßle (AUT) (93)	2
**Martin O'Donnell (ENG) (52)**	**6**
Ashley Carty (ENG) (106)	3
Michał Szubarczyk (POL) (77)	5
**Ross Muir (SCO) (84)**	**6**
**Lan Yuhao (CHN) (78)**	**6**
Oliver Sykes (ENG) (116)	2
**Michael Holt (ENG) (51)**	**6**
Mark Joyce (ENG) (a)	1
**Louis Heathcote (ENG) (67)**	**6**
Jimmy White (ENG) (94)	2
**Ben Mertens (BEL) (62)**	**6**
Antoni Kowalski (POL) (109)	2
**Ishpreet Singh Chadha (IND) (59)**	**6**
T. Tirapongpaiboon (THA) (119)	2
**Sam Craigie (ENG) (70)**	**6**
Chatchapong Nasa (THA) (91)	2
**Ricky Walden (ENG) (54)**	**6**
Wang Yuhang (CHN) (a)	4
**Gao Yang (CHN) (75)**	**6**
Andrew Higginson (ENG) (99)	2
David Grace (ENG) (74)	2
**Mitchell Mann (ENG) (100)**	**6**
Scott Donaldson (SCO) (55)	5
**Chen Ruifu (CHN) (a)**	**6**
**Iulian Boiko (UKR) (71)**	**6**
Zhang Yang (CHN) (a)	1
**Liu Hongyu (CHN) (58)**	**6**
Craig Steadman (ENG) (103)	1
**Jamie Jones (WAL) (63)**	**6**
Alfie Burden (ENG) (98)	1
**Liam Pullen (ENG) (66)**	**6**
Ryan Thomerson (AUS) (a)	5
**Long Zehuang (CHN) (50)**	**6**
Robert Milkins (ENG) (a)	3
**Yao Pengcheng (CHN) (79)**	**6**
Reanne Evans (ENG) (82)	1

**Round 3 (Last 80)**; Best of 11 frames
**Jack Lisowski (ENG) (17)**	**6**
Xu Yichen (CHN) (80)	4
**Chang Bingyu (CHN) (48)**	**6**
Matthew Stevens (WAL) (49)	4
Jak Jones (WAL) (32)	3
**Jiang Jun (CHN) (65)**	**6**
**Jimmy Robertson (ENG) (33)**	**6**
Jordan Brown (NIR) (64)	4
Stan Moody (ENG) (40)	3
**Fan Zhengyi (CHN) (57)**	**6**
**Pang Junxu (CHN) (25)**	**6**
Dylan Emery (WAL) (72)	0
**Aaron Hill (IRL) (41)**	**6**
Hammad Miah (ENG) (105)	1
**Gary Wilson (ENG) (24)**	**6**
Steven Hallworth (ENG) (73)	2
**Stuart Bingham (ENG) (21)**	**6**
Ian Burns (ENG) (76)	4
**Luca Brecel (BEL) (44)**	**6**
Jamie Clarke (WAL) (101)	4
**Hossein Vafaei (IRN) (28)**	**6**
Marco Fu (HKG) (69)	3
Ryan Day (WAL) (37)	4
**David Lilley (ENG) (60)**	**6**
**Tom Ford (ENG) (36)**	**6**
Lyu Haotian (CHN) (61)	3
Stephen Maguire (SCO) (29)	1
**Liam Highfield (ENG) (68)**	**6**
**Daniel Wells (WAL) (45)**	**6**
Martin O'Donnell (ENG) (52)	3
**Zhang Anda (CHN) (20)**	**6**
Ross Muir (SCO) (84)	2
**Elliot Slessor (ENG) (19)**	**6**
Lan Yuhao (CHN) (78)	3
**Noppon Saengkham (THA) (46)**	**6**
Michael Holt (ENG) (51)	3
**Yuan Sijun (CHN) (30)**	**6**
Louis Heathcote (ENG) (67)	5
**Jackson Page (WAL) (35)**	**6**
Ben Mertens (BEL) (62)	4
**Anthony McGill (SCO) (38)**	**6**
Ishpreet Singh Chadha (IND) (59)	2
**Joe O'Connor (ENG) (27)**	**6**
Sam Craigie (ENG) (70)	1
**Matthew Selt (ENG) (43)**	**6**
Ricky Walden (ENG) (54)	2
**Ali Carter (ENG) (22)**	**6**
Gao Yang (CHN) (75)	4
**Zhou Yuelong (CHN) (23)**	**6**
Mitchell Mann (ENG) (100)	3
Zak Surety (ENG) (42)	1
**Chen Ruifu (CHN) (a)**	**6**
Lei Peifan (CHN) (26)	2
**Iulian Boiko (UKR) (71)**	**6**
Ben Woollaston (ENG) (39)	2
**Liu Hongyu (CHN) (58)**	**6**
**Xu Si (CHN) (34)**	**6**
Jamie Jones (WAL) (63)	1
**David Gilbert (ENG) (31)**	**6**
Liam Pullen (ENG) (66)	4
**He Guoqiang (CHN) (47)**	**6**
Long Zehuang (CHN) (50)	1
Thepchaiya Un-Nooh (THA) (18)	3
**Yao Pengcheng (CHN) (79)**	**6**

**Round 4 (Last 48)**; Best of 11 frames
Jack Lisowski (ENG) (17)	1
**Chang Bingyu (CHN) (48)**	**6**
**Jiang Jun (CHN) (65)**	**6**
Jimmy Robertson (ENG) (33)	4
Fan Zhengyi (CHN) (57)	4
**Pang Junxu (CHN) (25)**	**6**
**Aaron Hill (IRL) (41)**	**6**
Gary Wilson (ENG) (24)	5
**Stuart Bingham (ENG) (21)**	**6**
Luca Brecel (BEL) (44)	0
**Hossein Vafaei (IRN) (28)**	**6**
David Lilley (ENG) (60)	1
**Tom Ford (ENG) (36)**	**6**
Liam Highfield (ENG) (68)	5
Daniel Wells (WAL) (45)	4
**Zhang Anda (CHN) (20)**	**6**
Elliot Slessor (ENG) (19)	1
**Noppon Saengkham (THA) (46)**	**6**
Yuan Sijun (CHN) (30)	3
**Jackson Page (WAL) (35)**	**6**
**Anthony McGill (SCO) (38)**	**6**
Joe O'Connor (ENG) (27)	2
**Matthew Selt (ENG) (43)**	**6**
Ali Carter (ENG) (22)	5
**Zhou Yuelong (CHN) (23)**	**6**
Chen Ruifu (CHN) (a)	3
Iulian Boiko (UKR) (71)	0
**Liu Hongyu (CHN) (58)**	**6**
Xu Si (CHN) (34)	2
**David Gilbert (ENG) (31)**	**6**
He Guoqiang (CHN) (47)	2
**Yao Pengcheng (CHN) (79)**	**6**

Note: w/d=withdrawn; w/o=walkover

== Century breaks ==
=== Main stage centuries ===
A total of 40 century breaks were made during the main stage of the tournament in Taiyuan.

- 140, 134, 134, 133, 119, 115, 108, 100 – Zhou Yuelong
- 140, 130 – Stuart Bingham
- 139, 132, 113, 103 – Shaun Murphy
- 138, 138, 137, 114, 102 – Mark Selby
- 134, 132, 118 – Zhang Anda
- 134, 120 – Noppon Saengkham
- 132, 122, 113, 110 – David Gilbert
- 132 – Xiao Guodong
- 122, 114, 102 – Neil Robertson
- 118, 111 – Liu Hongyu
- 110 – Chris Wakelin
- 108 – Si Jiahui
- 106, 100 – Wu Yize
- 101 – Yao Pengcheng
- 100 – Ronnie O'Sullivan

=== Qualifying stage centuries ===
A total of 80 century breaks were made during the qualifying stage of the tournament in Leicester.

- 147, 119 – Michael Holt
- 140, 110, 104 – Xu Si
- 140 – Chen Ruifu
- 138 – George Pragnell
- 137, 120 – Joe O'Connor
- 137 – Zhou Yuelong
- 137 – Artemijs Žižins
- 136, 102 – Matthew Selt
- 135, 133 – Liu Hongyu
- 135, 106, 103 – Liam Highfield
- 134, 133 – Ali Carter
- 134 – Marco Fu
- 134 – Long Zehuang
- 133, 105 – Lyu Haotian
- 133, 101, 100 – Tom Ford
- 132, 126, 119 – Hossein Vafaei
- 132 – Chang Bingyu
- 130 – Steven Hallworth
- 130 – Anthony McGill
- 129 – Alfie Burden
- 127, 118 – Lan Yuhao
- 125, 125 – Sam Craigie
- 125, 107 – Hammad Miah
- 123, 113 – Andrew Higginson
- 123, 107, 100 – Jackson Page
- 122, 118, 103 – Florian Nüßle
- 122, 116 – Jamie Jones
- 121 – T. Tirapongpaiboon
- 120 – Zhang Anda
- 119 – Ben Mertens
- 117 – David Gilbert
- 116, 116 – Fan Zhengyi
- 116 – Ian Burns
- 115 – He Guoqiang
- 114, 112, 108, 105 – Liam Pullen
- 114, 112, 101 – Jiang Jun
- 114 – Liam Davies
- 114 – Duane Jones
- 114 – David Lilley
- 114 – Robert Milkins
- 112 – Mark Joyce
- 112 – Jimmy White
- 107 – Luca Brecel
- 104 – Stuart Bingham
- 104 – Liu Yang
- 103 – Mateusz Baranowski
- 102 – Jamie Clarke
- 100 – Julien Leclercq
- 100 – Mitchell Mann
- 100 – Matthew Stevens
- 100 – Ricky Walden
