= 2026 Scottish Open (snooker) =

Snooker tournament

2026 BetVictor Scottish Open
- Part of the Home Nations Series

Tournament information
- Dates: 14–20 December 2026
- Venue: Meadowbank Sports Centre
- City: Edinburgh
- Country: Scotland
- Organisation: World Snooker Tour
- Format: Ranking event
- Total prize fund: £550,400
- Winner's share: £100,000
- Defending champion: Chris Wakelin (ENG)

The 2026 Scottish Open (officially the 2026 BetVictor Scottish Open) is an upcoming professional snooker tournament that will take place from 14 to 20 December 2026 at the Meadowbank Sports Centre in Edinburgh, Scotland. Qualifying took place from 20 to 23 September at the Leicester Arena in Leicester, England. The 11th consecutive edition of the tournament since it was revived in 2016, it will be the 11th ranking event of the 2026–27 snooker season, following the 2026 Snooker Shoot Out and preceding the 2027 German Masters. It will be the third of four tournaments in the season's Home Nations Series, following the 2026 English Open and the 2026 Northern Ireland Open and preceding the 2027 Welsh Open.

Chris Wakelin is the defending champion, having defeated Chang Bingyu 9–2 in the 2025 final.

== Overview ==
The tournament originated as the non-ranking 1981 International Open, staged at the Assembly Rooms in Derby, England. Steve Davis won the event, defeating Dennis Taylor 9–0 in the final. The tournament became a ranking event the following year, the first event after the World Snooker Championship to gain ranking status. Staged annually under various names (with the exception of the three years from 1990 to 1992, when it was not held), the tournament moved to Scotland in 1997 and was first branded as the Scottish Open in 1998. It was discontinued after the 2004 edition, apart from one staging in 2012 as a minor-ranking tournament. The tournament was restored to the calendar as a full ranking event in 2016 as part of the newly created Home Nations Series. Marco Fu won the 2016 edition, recovering from 1–4 behind to beat John Higgins 9–4 in the final; he was presented with the newly named Stephen Hendry Trophy by the seven-time World Champion personally.

The 2026 edition of the tournament—the 11th consecutive staging since its 2016 revival—will take place from 14 to 20 December at the Meadowbank Sports Centre in Edinburgh, Scotland. Qualifying took place from 20 to 23 September at the Leicester Arena in Leicester, England. Sponsored by BetVictor, it will be the 11th ranking event of the 2026–27 snooker season, following the 2026 Snooker Shoot Out and preceding the 2027 German Masters. It will also be the third of four tournaments in the season's Home Nations Series, following the 2026 English Open and the 2026 Northern Ireland Open and preceding the 2027 Welsh Open. Chris Wakelin is the defending champion, having defeated Chang Bingyu 9–2 in the 2025 final.

=== Format ===
The tournament uses a tiered format first implemented for the Home Nations Series in the 2024–25 snooker season. In round one, players seeded 65–96 face those seeded 97 and below, including selected amateurs. In round two, the winners from round one face players seeded 33–64. The winners from round two face the top 32 seeds. All matches are played as the best of 7 frames until the quarter‑finals, which are the best of 11. The semi‑finals are the best of 11, and the final is a best‑of‑17-frame match played over two sessions.

=== Prize fund ===
The prize fund for the tournament is detailed below.

- Winner: £100,000
- Runner-up: £45,000
- Semi-final: £21,000
- Quarter-final: £13,200
- Last 16: £9,000
- Last 32: £5,400
- Last 64: £3,600
- Last 96: £1,000
- Highest break: £5,000
- Total: £550,400

== Summary ==
=== Qualifying ===
==== Qualifying round one ====
Qualifying round 1 was played on 20 and 21 September.

Antoni Kowalski defeated Sam Craigie 4–3, amateur player Jack Borwick beat Ross Muir 4–1, Steven Wardropper, also an amateur, defeated Xu Yichen 4–3, Yao Pengcheng beat Hammad Miah 4–2, and Florian Nüßle defeated Deng Haohui 4–3, making breaks of 133 and 112.

Ng On-yee whitewashed fellow Hong Kong player Marco Fu, Liam Davies beat Julien Leclercq 4–1, Oliver Sykes defeated Reanne Evans 4–3, and Thanawat Tirapongpaiboon whitewashed Paul Norris. Liam Graham defeated Bai Yulu 4–3, and Connor Benzey beat Anton Kazakov by the same score. Sixty-four-year-old Jimmy White beat twenty-year-old Leone Crowley 4–2, Ian Burns beat Liu Yang 4–1, Jamie Clarke defeated Fergal Quinn 4–3, and Zhao Hanyang beat Phil O'Kane 4–1.

==== Qualifying round two ====
Qualifying round 2 was played on 22 and 23 September.

Chatchapong Nasa defeated Louis Heathcote 4–3, Luca Brecel whitewashed Gong Chenzhi, Iulian Boiko defeated Ben Mertens 4–3, Aaron Hill beat Kowalski 4–2, Stan Moody beat Jack Borwick 4–1, Scott Donaldson beat Mitchell Mann 4–2, and Matthew Stevens defeated Nüßle 4–3. Jimmy Robertson beat Steven Hallworth 4–2, Gao Yang whitewashed He Guoqiang, Oliver Lines beat Ashley Carty 4–1, and Ryan Day defeated Michał Szubarczyk 4–3.

Davies defeated Long Zehuang 4–3, Daniel Wells beat Sykes 4–2, Robbie Williams defeated Tirapongpaiboon 4–3, and Mateusz Baranowski beat Ricky Walden 4–1. David Lilley beat Liu Wenwei 4–1, Xu Si beat Ng 4–2, Liam Pullen whitewashed Artemijs Žižins, and Anthony McGill beat Wang Xinbo 4–2. Matthew Selt beat Graham 4–1, Martin O'Donnell beat Lan Yuhao 4–2, Lyu Haotian beat Benzey 4–1, and Fan Zhengyi beat David Grace 4–2. Liu Hongyu defeated White 4–3, Zhao beat Jamie Jones, Burns beat Michael Holt, and Clarke beat Zak Surety, all by 4–2.

== Main draw ==
The draw for the tournament is shown below. Numbers in the column to the left of the players' names denote the players' seeding, and players in bold denote match winners.

=== Top half ===
**Last 64**; Best of 7 frames
1	Chris Wakelin (ENG)
88	Chatchapong Nasa (THA)
31	Tom Ford (ENG)
37	Luca Brecel (BEL)
15	Zhou Yuelong (CHN)
66	Dylan Emery (WAL)
19	Jak Jones (WAL)
47	Matthew Stevens (WAL)
21	Thepchaiya Un-Nooh (THA)
43	Ben Woollaston (ENG)
11	Xiao Guodong (CHN)
59	Jiang Jun (CHN)
26	Hossein Vafaei (IRN)
34	Stan Moody (ENG)
8	Kyren Wilson (ENG)
60	Jordan Brown (NIR)
5	Neil Robertson (AUS)
71	Yao Pengcheng (CHN)
28	Stephen Maguire (SCO)
38	Ryan Day (WAL)
9	Mark Williams (WAL)
62	Scott Donaldson (SCO)
24	Lei Peifan (CHN)
72	Gao Yang (CHN)
22	Ali Carter (ENG)
41	Jimmy Robertson (ENG)
16	Stuart Bingham (ENG)
50	Oliver Lines (ENG)
25	Pang Junxu (CHN)
46	Daniel Wells (WAL)
4	Mark Selby (ENG)
81	Mateusz Baranowski (POL)

**Last 32**; Best of 7 frames

**Last 16**; Best of 7 frames

**Quarter-finals**; Best of 11 frames

**Semi-finals**; Best of 11 frames

=== Bottom half ===
**Last 64**; Best of 7 frames
3	Zhao Xintong (CHN)
49	Robbie Williams (ENG)
27	Joe O'Connor (ENG)
82	Liam Davies (WAL)
13	Jack Lisowski (ENG)
54	David Lilley (ENG)
17	Si Jiahui (CHN)
36	Anthony McGill (SCO)
20	Elliot Slessor (ENG)
35	Xu Si (CHN)
10	Barry Hawkins (ENG)
63	Liam Pullen (ENG)
29	David Gilbert (ENG)
48	Fan Zhengyi (CHN)
6	John Higgins (SCO)
65	Iulian Boiko (UKR)
7	Shaun Murphy (ENG)
56	Lyu Haotian (CHN)
32	Jackson Page (WAL)
33	Aaron Hill (IRL)
12	Mark Allen (NIR)
51	Martin O'Donnell (ENG)
23	Gary Wilson (ENG)
44	Matthew Selt (ENG)
18	Chang Bingyu (CHN)
96	Jamie Clarke (WAL)
14	Zhang Anda (CHN)
78	Zhao Hanyang (CHN)
30	Yuan Sijun (CHN)
73	Ian Burns (ENG)
2	Wu Yize (CHN)
52	Liu Hongyu (CHN)

**Last 32**; Best of 7 frames

**Last 16**; Best of 7 frames

**Quarter-finals**; Best of 11 frames

**Semi-finals**; Best of 11 frames

== Qualifying rounds ==
The results of the early rounds are shown below. Numbers in parentheses after the players' names denote the players' seeding, an "a" indicates amateur players who were not on the main World Snooker Tour, and players in bold denote match winners.

**Round 1 (Last 128)**; Best of 7 frames
**Chatchapong Nasa (THA) (88)**	**4**
Allan Taylor (ENG) (a)	1
Sahil Nayyar (CAN) (94)	3
**Gong Chenzhi (CHN) (100)**	**4**
**Dylan Emery (WAL) (66)**	**4**
Ashley Hugill (ENG) (120)	1
**Florian Nüßle (AUT) (87)**	**4**
Deng Haohui (CHN) (117)	3
**Alexander Ursenbacher (SUI) (89)**	**4**
Panchaya Channoi (THA) (122)	0
**Oliver Brown (ENG) (86)**	**4**
Michael Larkov (UKR) (118)	2
Ross Muir (SCO) (77)	1
**Jack Borwick (SCO) (a)**	**4**
Xu Yichen (CHN) (76)	3
**Steven Wardropper (SCO) (a)**	**4**
**Yao Pengcheng (CHN) (71)**	**4**
Hammad Miah (ENG) (103)	2
**Michał Szubarczyk (POL) (74)**	**4**
Cheung Ka Wai (HKG) (108)	2
**Mitchell Mann (ENG) (93)**	**4**
Stuart Carrington (ENG) (119)	2
**Gao Yang (CHN) (72)**	**4**
Huang Jiahao (CHN) (111)	2
**Steven Hallworth (ENG) (69)**	**4**
Alfie Burden (ENG) (101)	2
**Ashley Carty (ENG) (95)**	**4**
Mina Awad (EGY) (123)	1
Reanne Evans (ENG) (79)	3
**Oliver Sykes (ENG) (102)**	**4**
**Mateusz Baranowski (POL) (81)**	**4**
Patrick Whelan (ENG) (a)	0

**Round 2 (Last 96)**; Best of 7 frames
Louis Heathcote (ENG) (64)	3
**Chatchapong Nasa (THA) (88)**	**4**
**Luca Brecel (BEL) (37)**	**4**
Gong Chenzhi (CHN) (100)	0
Ishpreet Singh Chadha (IND) (57)	2
**Dylan Emery (WAL) (66)**	**4**
**Matthew Stevens (WAL) (47)**	**4**
Florian Nüßle (AUT) (87)	3
**Ben Woollaston (ENG) (43)**	**4**
Alexander Ursenbacher (SUI) (89)	3
**Jiang Jun (CHN) (59)**	**4**
Oliver Brown (ENG) (86)	1
**Stan Moody (ENG) (34)**	**4**
Jack Borwick (SCO) (a)	1
**Jordan Brown (NIR) (60)**	**4**
Steven Wardropper (SCO) (a)	0
Liam Highfield (ENG) (61)	1
**Yao Pengcheng (CHN) (71)**	**4**
**Ryan Day (WAL) (38)**	**4**
Michał Szubarczyk (POL) (74)	3
**Scott Donaldson (SCO) (62)**	**4**
Mitchell Mann (ENG) (93)	2
He Guoqiang (CHN) (40)	0
**Gao Yang (CHN) (72)**	**4**
**Jimmy Robertson (ENG) (41)**	**4**
Steven Hallworth (ENG) (69)	2
**Oliver Lines (ENG) (50)**	**4**
Ashley Carty (ENG) (95)	1
**Daniel Wells (WAL) (46)**	**4**
Oliver Sykes (ENG) (102)	2
Ricky Walden (ENG) (53)	1
**Mateusz Baranowski (POL) (81)**	**4**

**Round 1 (Last 128)**; Best of 7 frames
**T. Tirapongpaiboon (THA) (92)**	**4**
Paul Norris (ENG) (121)	0
**Liam Davies (WAL) (82)**	**4**
Julien Leclercq (BEL) (110)	1
**Liu Wenwei (CHN) (80)**	**4**
Andrew Higginson (ENG) (107)	3
**Wang Xinbo (CHN) (91)**	**4**
Luo Zetao (CHN) (112)	2
Marco Fu (HKG) (67)	0
**Ng On-yee (HKG) (104)**	**4**
**Artemijs Žižins (LVA) (85)**	**4**
Craig Steadman (ENG) (116)	2
**David Grace (ENG) (70)**	**4**
Sean O'Sullivan (ENG) (105)	1
**Iulian Boiko (UKR) (65)**	**4**
Mahmoud El Hareedy (EGY) (99)	2
**Connor Benzey (ENG) (90)**	**4**
Anton Kazakov (UKR) (115)	3
Sam Craigie (ENG) (68)	3
**Antoni Kowalski (POL) (113)**	**4**
**Lan Yuhao (CHN) (75)**	**4**
Joshua Thomond (ENG) (a)	2
**Liam Graham (SCO) (83)**	**4**
Bai Yulu (CHN) (114)	3
**Jamie Clarke (WAL) (96)**	**4**
Fergal Quinn (NIR) (97)	3
**Zhao Hanyang (CHN) (78)**	**4**
Phil O'Kane (ENG) (109)	1
**Ian Burns (ENG) (73)**	**4**
Liu Yang (CHN) (106)	1
Leone Crowley (IRL) (84)	2
**Jimmy White (ENG) (98)**	**4**

**Round 2 (Last 96)**; Best of 7 frames
**Robbie Williams (ENG) (49)**	**4**
T. Tirapongpaiboon (THA) (92)	3
Long Zehuang (CHN) (45)	3
**Liam Davies (WAL) (82)**	**4**
**David Lilley (ENG) (54)**	**4**
Liu Wenwei (CHN) (80)	1
**Anthony McGill (SCO) (36)**	**4**
Wang Xinbo (CHN) (91)	2
**Xu Si (CHN) (35)**	**4**
Ng On-yee (HKG) (104)	2
**Liam Pullen (ENG) (63)**	**4**
Artemijs Žižins (LVA) (85)	0
**Fan Zhengyi (CHN) (48)**	**4**
David Grace (ENG) (70)	2
Ben Mertens (BEL) (55)	3
**Iulian Boiko (UKR) (65)**	**4**
**Lyu Haotian (CHN) (56)**	**4**
Connor Benzey (ENG) (90)	1
**Aaron Hill (IRL) (33)**	**4**
Antoni Kowalski (POL) (113)	2
**Martin O'Donnell (ENG) (51)**	**4**
Lan Yuhao (CHN) (75)	2
**Matthew Selt (ENG) (44)**	**4**
Liam Graham (SCO) (83)	1
Zak Surety (ENG) (39)	2
**Jamie Clarke (WAL) (96)**	**4**
Jamie Jones (WAL) (58)	2
**Zhao Hanyang (CHN) (78)**	**4**
Michael Holt (ENG) (42)	2
**Ian Burns (ENG) (73)**	**4**
**Liu Hongyu (CHN) (52)**	**4**
Jimmy White (ENG) (98)	3

== Century breaks ==
=== Qualifying stage centuries ===
A total of 25 century breaks were made during the qualifying stage of the tournament in Leicester.

- 139, 121, 100 – Aaron Hill
- 137 – Zhao Hanyang
- 133, 112 – Florian Nüßle
- 133 – Yao Pengcheng
- 132 – Wang Xinbo
- 131 – Jimmy White
- 130 – Fan Zhengyi
- 122, 109 – Gao Yang
- 122 – Jordan Brown
- 121 – Thanawat Tirapongpaiboon
- 120 – Mitchell Mann
- 118 – Ian Burns
- 115 – Alfie Burden
- 114 – Jiang Jun
- 108 – Oliver Lines
- 103 – Lyu Haotian
- 102 – Andrew Higginson
- 101 – Oliver Sykes
- 100 – Liam Highfield
- 100 – Daniel Wells
- 100 – Robbie Williams
