= 2027 Welsh Open (snooker) =

Snooker tournament

2027 BetVictor Welsh Open
- Part of the Home Nations Series

Tournament information
- Dates: 8–14 February 2027
- Venue: Venue Cymru
- City: Llandudno
- Country: Wales
- Organisation: World Snooker Tour
- Format: Ranking event
- Defending champion: Barry Hawkins (ENG)

The 2027 Welsh Open (officially the 2027 BetVictor Welsh Open) is an upcoming professional snooker tournament that will take place from 8 to 14 February 2027 at Venue Cymru in Llandudno, Wales. Qualifying will take place on 2 and 3 February at the Leicester Arena in Leicester, England. The 36th consecutive edition of the Welsh Open since it was first staged in 1992, the tournament will be the 13th ranking event of the 2026–27 snooker season, following the 2026 German Masters and preceding the 2027 World Grand Prix. It will be the fourth and final tournament in the season's Home Nations Series, following the 2026 English Open, the 2026 Northern Ireland Open, and the 2026 Scottish Open.

Barry Hawkins is the defending champion, having defeated Jack Lisowski 9–5 in the 2026 final.

== Overview ==
The Welsh Open replaced the Welsh Professional Championship, a non-ranking tournament open only to Welsh players that was held in 1922, in 1977, and annually from 1980 to 1991. Open to players of any nationality, the Welsh Open began in 1992 and is now the third-longest-running ranking event, after the World Snooker Championship and the UK Championship. The inaugural winner was Stephen Hendry, who defeated Darren Morgan 9–3 in the 1992 final. During the 2016–17 snooker season, the Welsh Open became part of the newly created Home Nations Series, alongside the English Open, the Northern Ireland Open, and the Scottish Open. At that time, the trophy was named the Ray Reardon Trophy to honour the six-time world champion from Tredegar. Reardon died in 2024, aged 91.

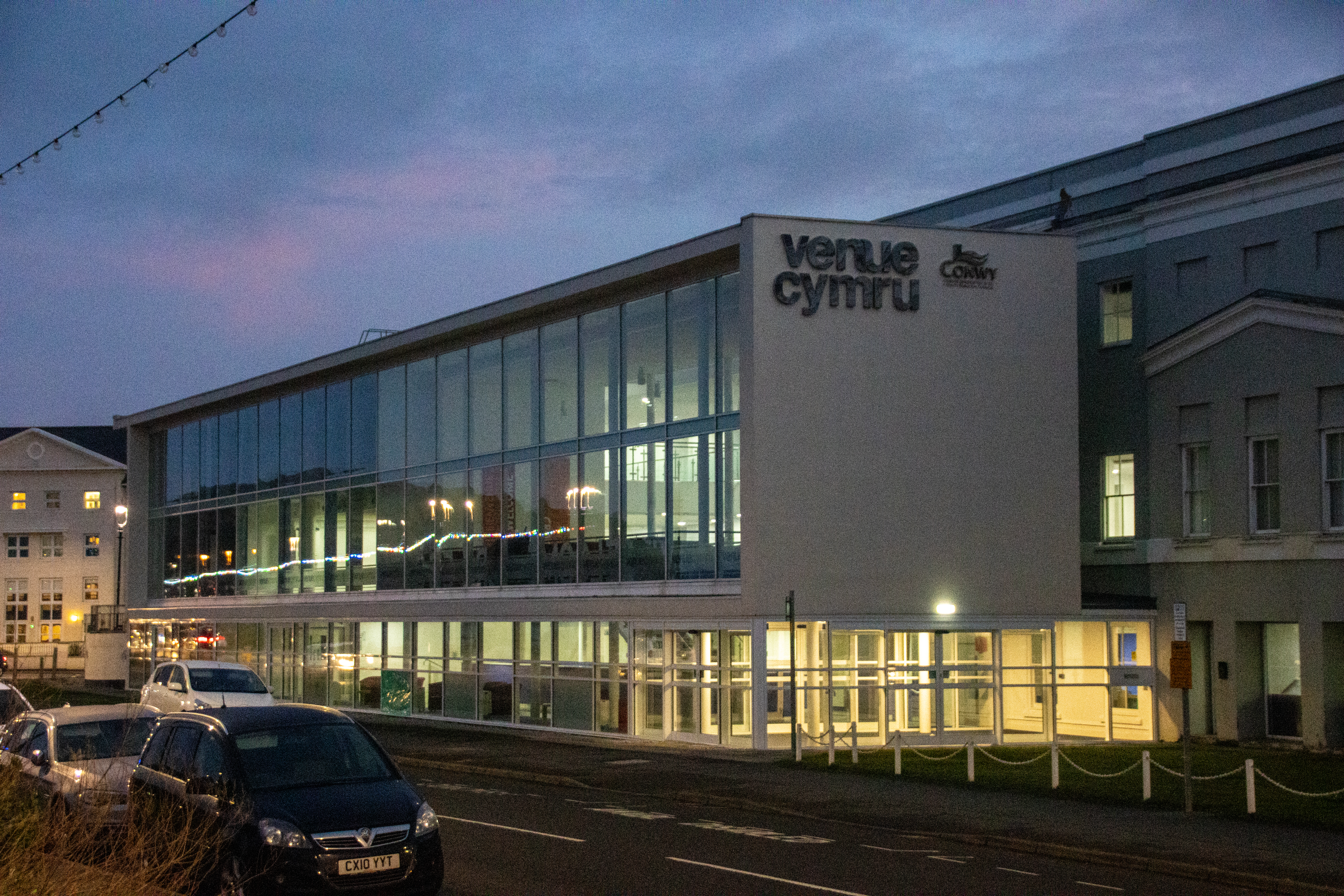
The main stage of the tournament will be played at Venue Cymru (pictured in 2020) in Llandudno, Wales.

The 2027 edition of the tournament—its 36th consecutive staging since the inaugural edition in 1992—will take place from 8 to 14 February at Venue Cymru in Llandudno, Wales, the fifth consecutive year the tournament will be staged at the venue. Qualifying will take place on 2 and 3 February at the Leicester Arena in Leicester, England. Sponsored by BetVictor, it will be the thirteenth ranking event of the 2026–27 snooker season, following the 2026 German Masters and preceding the 2027 World Grand Prix. It will also be the fourth and final tournament in the season's Home Nations Series, following the 2026 English Open, the 2026 Northern Ireland Open, and the 2026 Scottish Open. Barry Hawkins is the defending champion, having defeated Jack Lisowski 9–5 in the 2026 final.
