= Home Nations Series =

Series of four snooker tournaments

Tournament information
- Location: Brentwood; Belfast; Edinburgh; Llandudno
- Country: United Kingdom
- Established: 2016; 10 years ago
- Organisation(s): World Snooker Tour
- Format: 4 ranking events
- Winner's share: £150,000 (series) £100,000 (per event)
- Recent edition: 2025–26
- Current champion: Jack Lisowski (ENG)

The Home Nations Series (officially the BetVictor Home Nations Series for sponsorship reasons) is a series of ranking snooker tournaments organised by the World Snooker Tour, held throughout the season in each of the four home nations in the United Kingdom under the names of English Open, Welsh Open, Scottish Open and Northern Ireland Open. The series was devised in 2015 by Barry Hearn, the chairman of the tour at the time, and started its first edition during the 2016–17 snooker season.

The series features an inclusion of two wildcard spots for the local amateur players in each event, selected by the respective national governing bodies. The best-performing player of the series is entitled to the Home Nations Bonus (BetVictor Bonus), a £150,000 bonus prize awarded on top of the player's winnings. Jack Lisowski is the current series champion.

== History ==
Whilst professional snooker tournaments were increasing in popularity throughout the British Isles during the 1980s, the events were largely uncoordinated and there was never a snooker season with all four home nations holding at least one open event in its name within the same season.

On 29 April 2015, it was announced that, starting from the 2016–17 snooker season, a new "Home Nations Series" would be added to the season's calendar. Being the home of snooker, the series includes tournaments of the four countries in the United Kingdom by combining the existing Scottish Open and Welsh Open with the newly created English Open and the Northern Ireland Open. There was a special bonus of £1 million on offer to the player who would win all four tournaments in the same season until 2020, when it was dropped in light of the then-ongoing COVID-19 pandemic. The special bonus has never been reinstated since the conclusion of the pandemic, instead being replaced by the BetVictor Bonus prize.

As for the individual events of the series, the total prize fund and winners' cheque was initially lower than most other events, but has increased over time, now offering a total prize fund of £550,400 with a winners' cheque of £100,000, which is considered equal to the majority of events neither hosted in China or the Triple Crown Series. The series received a new logo in line with WST's revised rebranding in 2024. The 2025-26 snooker season was notionally the final year of the series, as part of the original ten-year contract with Eurosport, but the success of the tournaments led the series to be renewed for subsequent seasons.

Timeline of Home Nations snooker open events

== Trophies and prizes ==
The trophies of the individual tournaments are named after well-known snooker players of the respective countries:

- At the English Open: the Steve Davis trophy.
- At the Northern Ireland Open: the Alex Higgins trophy.
- At the Scottish Open: the Stephen Hendry trophy.
- At the Welsh Open: the Ray Reardon trophy.

=== Home Nations Bonus ===
Besides the prize money players could earn within an event, a bonus prize (named the BetVictor Bonus under sponsorship) of £150,000 is also awarded to the Home Nations Series champion, the player who earned the most cumulative prize money across all the Home Nations Series events. It was initially set up under the European Series banner since the 2021-22 season, where all Home Nations Series events were included; it was until the 2024-25 season when the European Series was discontinued, and the bonus prize is now won solely based on the performance within the Home Nations Series events.

==== 2024–25 ====
Neil Robertson won the 2024–25 Home Nations Bonus in a closely fought Home Nations season, where each of the four champions did not make it to the other three series semi-finals. The outcome was decided when Luca Brecel lost his 2025 Welsh Open semi-final, as had Brecel gone on to win he would have won the Bonus on a count back, as his prize money would have been equal to Robertson's.

==== 2025–26 ====
Five players remained in the running for the 2025–26 Home Nations Bonus as of the start of the 2026 Welsh Open. Mark Allen lead with £142,000 prize money, followed by the other two tournament champions Chris Wakelin and Jack Lisowski, with three potential outsiders Zhou Yuelong, Judd Trump and Chang Bingyu, however Trump decided not to play the Welsh Open. On the eve of the Welsh Open semi-finals, only Lisowski remained to challenge Allen's lead, so the semi-final against John Higgins would be the effective Home Nations Series championship match. Lisowski won the Welsh Open semi-final with a frame-winning break in the final decider frame 6–5 against Higgins to win the Home Nations Series and its £150,000 Betvictor Bonus prize. Allen responded, saying, "Fair play. [I’m] not sure I’m ever gonna win that bonus. [That’s the] fourth time in six years I’ve been second.” Northern Ireland Open champion and Welsh Open runner up Lisowski finished with £154,000 Home Nations winnings to overtake English Open champion and semi-finalist in the Scottish and Northern Ireland Opens Mark Allen's £142,000.

Home Nations Bonus winners
Season	Winner	Aggregate winnings	Bonus prize	Ref.
2024–25	Neil Robertson (AUS)	£124,000	£150,000	
2025–26	Jack Lisowski (ENG)	£154,000	£150,000	
2026–27			£150,000	

== Format ==
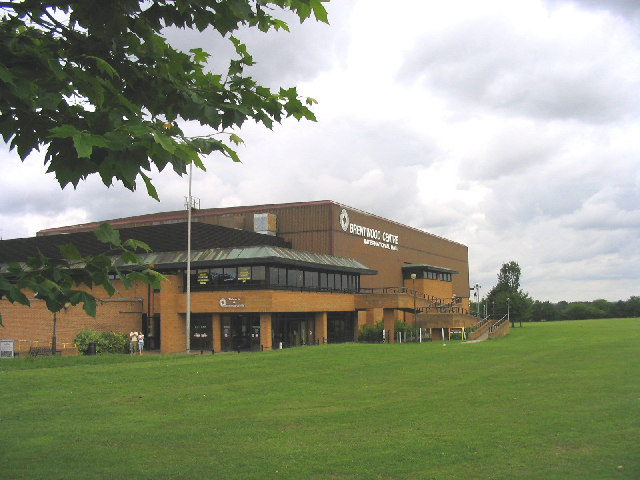
The Brentwood Centre in Essex hosts the English Open

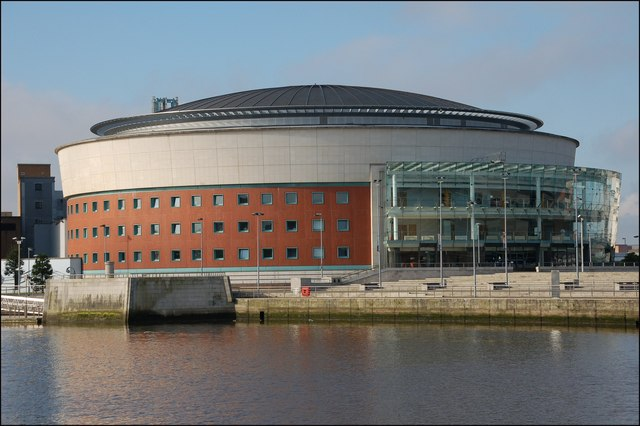
The Waterfront Hall in Belfast has hosted the Northern Ireland Open since 2017

All tournaments within the series are ranking tournaments of the World Snooker Tour and are played with 128 players. After first nominating all professional players, the wildcard players will be nominated from the respective regional snooker associations, and finally top–up players from the Q School order of merit.

Up to and including the last 16, the matches are played as best–of–seven frames, in the quarter–finals and semi–finals as best–of–eleven frames, and in the final best–of–seventeen. Prior to the 2026–27 season, the quarter-finals were played as a best-of-nine frames, with the afternoon session utilising the roll-on, roll-off system with a slightly earlier starting time.

In the 2021–22 season, the last 128 round was modified slightly by being turned into a mini–qualifying round, where players outside of the top 16 have to win a match in order to play at the final venue. The top 16 still play in the qualifying round, but their matches are held over to be played at the final venue instead.

Starting from the 2024–25 season, all tournaments in the series were changed to adopt a tiered system from the flat-draw format, bringing them more into line with other events that have moved towards protecting higher-ranked professionals. The new format means that the Top 32 players on the world rankings at the designated cut–off point are automatically sent through to the Last 64 round and will not play a qualifying round. Everyone below the Top 32 will play in a two–round qualifying format: the first round will see those professionals seeded 65–96 playing in a match against those professionals seeded 97–128. The winners of that first round will play in a second round, where they will be facing professionals seeded 33–64, with the qualifying winners being placed randomly against the Top 32. The justification for the change in format was described by the World Snooker Tour as "giving the lower ranked players the opportunity to earn prize money through the earlier rounds and beyond, while ensuring that television audiences and ticket–holders can see the leading players at the final venue."

== Results ==
=== Tournaments ===
Season	Tournament	City	Winner	Score	Runner-up
2016–17	English Open	Manchester	Liang Wenbo (CHN)	9–6	Judd Trump (ENG)
2016–17	Northern Ireland Open	Belfast	Mark King (ENG)	9–8	Barry Hawkins (ENG)
2016–17	Scottish Open	Glasgow	Marco Fu (HKG)	9–4	John Higgins (SCO)
2016–17	Welsh Open	Cardiff	Stuart Bingham (ENG)	9–8	Judd Trump (ENG)
2017–18	English Open	Barnsley	Ronnie O'Sullivan (ENG)	9–2	Kyren Wilson (ENG)
2017–18	Northern Ireland Open	Belfast	Mark Williams (WAL)	9–8	Yan Bingtao (CHN)
2017–18	Scottish Open	Glasgow	Neil Robertson (AUS)	9–8	Cao Yupeng (CHN)
2017–18	Welsh Open	Cardiff	John Higgins (SCO)	9–7	Barry Hawkins (ENG)
2018–19	English Open	Crawley	Stuart Bingham (ENG)	9–7	Mark Davis (ENG)
2018–19	Northern Ireland Open	Belfast	Judd Trump (ENG)	9–7	Ronnie O'Sullivan (ENG)
2018–19	Scottish Open	Glasgow	Mark Allen (NIR)	9–7	Shaun Murphy (ENG)
2018–19	Welsh Open	Cardiff	Neil Robertson (AUS)	9–7	Stuart Bingham (ENG)
2019–20	English Open	Crawley	Mark Selby (ENG)	9–1	David Gilbert (ENG)
2019–20	Northern Ireland Open	Belfast	Judd Trump (ENG)	9–7	Ronnie O'Sullivan (ENG)
2019–20	Scottish Open	Glasgow	Mark Selby (ENG)	9–6	Jack Lisowski (ENG)
2019–20	Welsh Open	Cardiff	Shaun Murphy (ENG)	9–1	Kyren Wilson (ENG)
2020–21	English Open	Milton Keynes	Judd Trump (ENG)	9–8	Neil Robertson (AUS)
2020–21	Northern Ireland Open	Milton Keynes	Judd Trump (ENG)	9–7	Ronnie O'Sullivan (ENG)
2020–21	Scottish Open	Milton Keynes	Mark Selby (ENG)	9–3	Ronnie O'Sullivan (ENG)
2020–21	Welsh Open	Newport	Jordan Brown (NIR)	9–8	Ronnie O'Sullivan (ENG)
2021–22	Northern Ireland Open	Belfast	Mark Allen (NIR)	9–8	John Higgins (SCO)
2021–22	English Open	Milton Keynes	Neil Robertson (AUS)	9–8	John Higgins (SCO)
2021–22	Scottish Open	Llandudno	Luca Brecel (BEL)	9–5	John Higgins (SCO)
2021–22	Welsh Open	Newport	Joe Perry (ENG)	9–5	Judd Trump (ENG)
2022–23	Northern Ireland Open	Belfast	Mark Allen (NIR)	9–4	Zhou Yuelong (CHN)
2022–23	Scottish Open	Edinburgh	Gary Wilson (ENG)	9–2	Joe O'Connor (ENG)
2022–23	English Open	Brentwood	Mark Selby (ENG)	9–6	Luca Brecel (BEL)
2022–23	Welsh Open	Llandudno	Robert Milkins (ENG)	9–7	Shaun Murphy (ENG)
2023–24	English Open	Brentwood	Judd Trump (ENG)	9–7	Zhang Anda (CHN)
2023–24	Northern Ireland Open	Belfast	Judd Trump (ENG)	9–3	Chris Wakelin (ENG)
2023–24	Scottish Open	Edinburgh	Gary Wilson (ENG)	9–5	Noppon Saengkham (THA)
2023–24	Welsh Open	Llandudno	Gary Wilson (ENG)	9–4	Martin O'Donnell (ENG)
2024–25	English Open	Brentwood	Neil Robertson (AUS)	9–7	Wu Yize (CHN)
2024–25	Northern Ireland Open	Belfast	Kyren Wilson (ENG)	9–3	Judd Trump (ENG)
2024–25	Scottish Open	Edinburgh	Lei Peifan (CHN)	9–5	Wu Yize (CHN)
2024–25	Welsh Open	Llandudno	Mark Selby (ENG)	9–6	Stephen Maguire (SCO)
2025–26	English Open	Brentwood	Mark Allen (NIR)	9–8	Zhou Yuelong (CHN)
2025–26	Northern Ireland Open	Belfast	Jack Lisowski (ENG)	9–8	Judd Trump (ENG)
2025–26	Scottish Open	Edinburgh	Chris Wakelin (ENG)	9–2	Chang Bingyu (CHN)
2025–26	Welsh Open	Llandudno	Barry Hawkins (ENG)	9–5	Jack Lisowski (ENG)
2026–27	English Open	Brentwood	Ali Carter (ENG)	9–6	Mark Williams (WAL)
2026–27	Northern Ireland Open	Belfast	Kyren Wilson (ENG)	9–2	Jak Jones (WAL)
2026–27	Scottish Open	Edinburgh			
2026–27	Welsh Open	Llandudno			

== Records ==
=== Attendance ===
The highest number of attendance for a Home Nations Series event final is 1,435, achieved during the 2025 Northern Ireland Open at the Waterfront Hall in Belfast.

=== Champions ===
The highest number of tournaments won in the same season is two, being achieved four times, first by Mark Selby in the 2019–20 season (English and Scottish Open). Judd Trump has won two twice, in the 2020–21 and the 2023–24 seasons (English and Northern Ireland Open both times). Gary Wilson won the Scottish and Welsh Open in the 2023–24 season.

No player has yet won all four tournaments in their career. Three have won three, with Mark Selby and Neil Robertson both not having won the Northern Ireland Open, while Mark Allen has not yet won the Welsh Open.

No native players have won the Scottish or Welsh Open since 2000, before the series was even formed.

Player	Total	English Open	Northern Ireland Open	Scottish Open	Welsh Open	Winning span
Judd Trump (ENG)	6	2	4	0	0	2018–2023
Mark Selby (ENG)	5	2	0	2	1	2019–2025
Neil Robertson (AUS)	4	2	0	1	1	2017–2024
Mark Allen (NIR)	4	1	2	1	0	2018–2025
Gary Wilson (ENG)	3	0	0	2	1	2022–2024
Stuart Bingham (ENG)	2	1	0	0	1	2017–2018
Kyren Wilson (ENG)	2	0	2	0	0	2024–2026
Liang Wenbo (CHN)	1	1	0	0	0	2016
Mark King (ENG)	1	0	1	0	0	2016
Marco Fu (HKG)	1	0	0	1	0	2016
Ronnie O'Sullivan (ENG)	1	1	0	0	0	2017
Mark Williams (WAL)	1	0	1	0	0	2017
John Higgins (SCO)	1	0	0	0	1	2018
Shaun Murphy (ENG)	1	0	0	0	1	2020
Jordan Brown (NIR)	1	0	0	0	1	2021
Luca Brecel (BEL)	1	0	0	1	0	2021
Joe Perry (ENG)	1	0	0	0	1	2022
Robert Milkins (ENG)	1	0	0	0	1	2023
Lei Peifan (CHN)	1	0	0	1	0	2024
Jack Lisowski (ENG)	1	0	1	0	0	2025
Chris Wakelin (ENG)	1	0	0	1	0	2025
Barry Hawkins (ENG)	1	0	0	0	1	2026
Ali Carter (ENG)	1	1	0	0	0	2026
Total events	42	11	11	10	10	2016–2026
