= Yao Pengcheng =

Chinese snooker player (born 1997)

Personal information
- Born: 3 January 1997 (age 29)

Sport
- Country: China
- Sport: Snooker
- Professional: 2025–present
- Highest ranking: 75 (August 2026)
- Current ranking: 76 (as of 7 November 2026)

Yao Pengcheng (born 3 January 1997) is a Chinese snooker player. He won a two-year card on the World Snooker Tour starting from the 2025-26 snooker season.

== Career ==
He won the CBSA China Tour in 2024 ahead of compatriot Lan Yuhao. He was awarded a two-year card on the World Snooker Tour, from the start of the 2025-26 snooker season.

=== 2025–26 season ===
He topped his round-robin group in the 2025 Championship League in Leicester on 30 June 2025, going unbeaten against compatriots Zhao Hanyang and Lyu Haotian, and recording his first win as a professional against Welshman Jamie Jones. He recorded a 5-1 win over Zak Surety at the 2025 Xi'an Grand Prix, which included a break of 137 in September 2025, and also recorded a 4-1 win over former world champion Ken Doherty that month at the 2025 Northern Ireland Open. He reached the third round of qualifying for the 2026 World Snooker Championship where he faced Aaron Hill of Ireland, losing 10-3.

=== 2026-27 season ===
In June 2026, Pengcheng won three matches against Reanne Evans, Thepchaiya Un-Nooh and He Guoqiang to reach the main draw at the China Open, before recording wins over Thanawat Tirapongpaiboon, Jimmy Robertson and Jack Lisowski to reach the main draw of the 2026 Wuhan Open, and start the season with six wins out of six. In September, he whitewashed Stan Moody to reach the main draw at the 2026 Northern Ireland Open and defeated Elliot Slessor to reach the main draw at the 2026 International Championship.

== Performance and rankings timeline ==
Tournament	2012/ 13	2013/ 14	2014/ 15	2015/ 16	2025/ 26	2026/ 27
Ranking (Note: It shows the ranking at the beginning of the season)	(Note: He was an amateur)				(Note: New players on the Main Tour don't have a ranking)	79
Ranking tournaments
Championship League	Non-Ranking Event				2R	RR
China Open	A	A	A	A	NH	1R
Wuhan Open	Tournament Not Held				LQ	1R
British Open	Tournament Not Held				LQ	1R
English Open	Tournament Not Held				LQ	LQ
Shenzhen Open (Note: The event was called the Xi'an Grand Prix (2025/2026))	Tournament Not Held				1R	LQ
Northern Ireland Open	Tournament Not Held				LQ	1R
International Championship	A	A	A	A	LQ	1R
UK Championship	A	A	A	A	LQ	
Shoot Out	Non-Ranking Event				1R	
Scottish Open	MR	Not Held			LQ	
German Masters	A	A	A	A	LQ	LQ
Welsh Open	A	A	A	A	LQ	
World Grand Prix	Not Held		NR	DNQ	DNQ	
Players Championship (Note: The event was called the Players Tour Championship Grand Final (2012/2013–2015/2016))	DNQ	DNQ	DNQ	DNQ	DNQ	
World Open	A	A	Not Held		1R	
Tour Championship	Tournament Not Held				DNQ	
World Championship	A	A	A	A	LQ	
Former ranking tournaments
Shanghai Masters	A	A	A	WR	Non-Ranking	
Saudi Arabia Masters	Tournament Not Held				1R	NH

Performance Table Legend
LQ	lost in the qualifying draw	#R	lost in the early rounds of the tournament (WR = Wildcard round, RR = Round robin)	QF	lost in the quarter-finals
SF	lost in the semi-finals	F	lost in the final	W	won the tournament
DNQ	did not qualify for the tournament	A	did not participate in the tournament	WD	withdrew from the tournament

NH / Not Held	means an event was not held.
NR / Non-Ranking Event	means an event is/was no longer a ranking event.
R / Ranking Event	means an event is/was a ranking event.
MR / Minor-Ranking Event	means an event is/was a minor-ranking event.
