= Chatchapong Nasa =

Thai snooker player

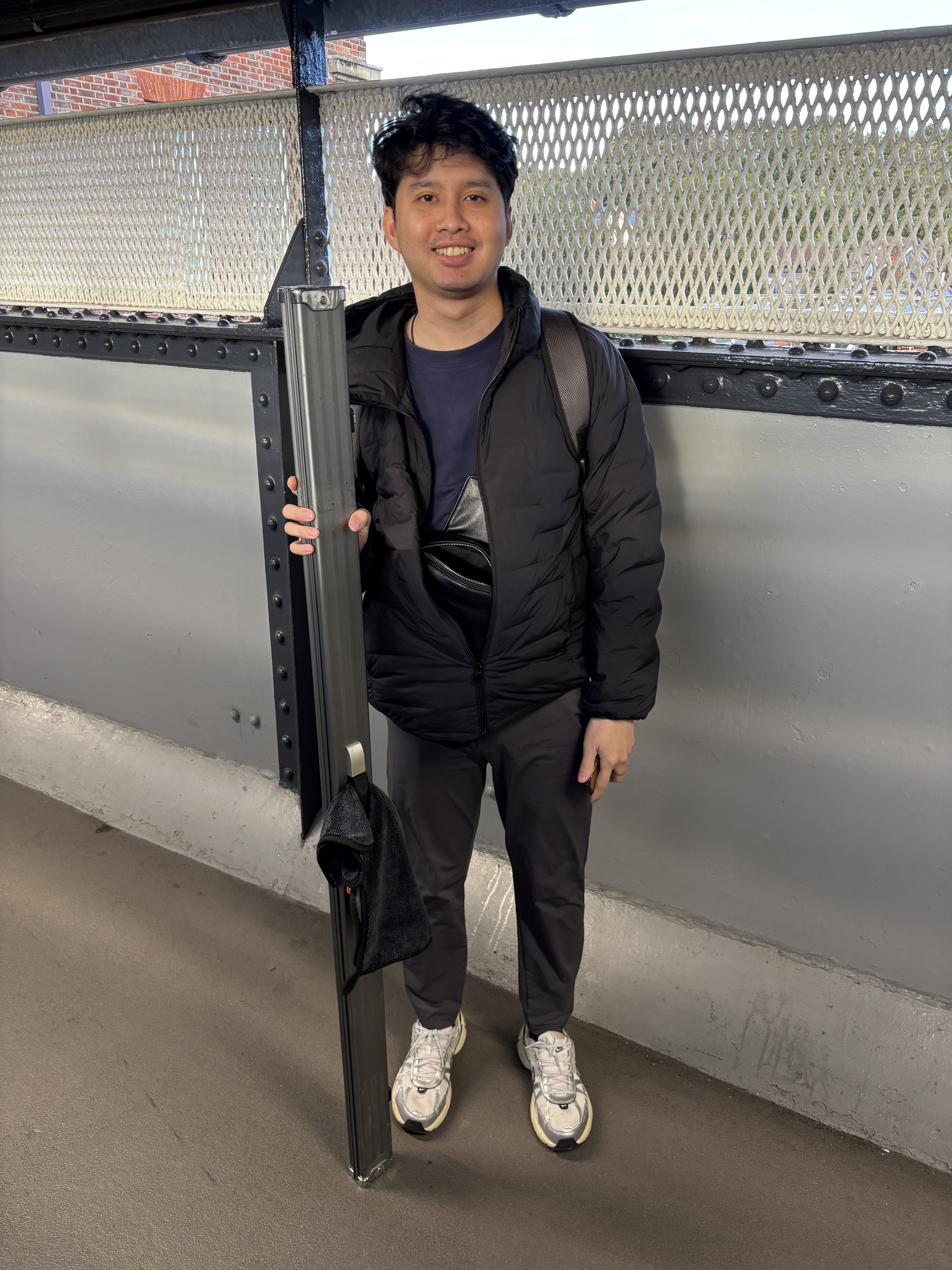
- Nasa in 2025

Personal information
- Nickname: The Astronaut
- Born: 13 January 1998 (age 28) Kanchanaburi, Thailand

Sport
- Country: Thailand
- Sport: Snooker
- Professional: 2025–present
- Highest ranking: 91 (August 2026)
- Current ranking: 101 (as of 7 November 2026)
- Best ranking finish: Last 80 (2025 Saudi Arabia Snooker Masters)

Chatchapong Nasa (Thai: ชัชพงศ์ นาสา; born 13 January 1998) is a Thai professional snooker player. He won a two-year card on the World Snooker Tour starting with the 2025-26 snooker season.

== Early life ==
He is from Kanchanaburi Province in western Thailand, and started playing cue sports at eight years-old before focusing on snooker from the age of 13 years-old.

== Career ==
He competed at the WSF Championship in Morocco in January 2025, where his results included a win over Ng On-Yee.

Competing at the Asia-Oceania Q School Event 1 in Thailand in May 2025, Nasa earned a two-year card on the World Snooker Tour after he beat Feng Yu 4-1 and Zhao Hanyang 4-2 before a 4-0 victory over Liu Linhao in the final round. Nasa became the fourth Thai player to qualify for the professional circuit through the Q School held in Thailand since 2022. His eligibility is from the 2025-26 snooker season. It was his fourth attempt to win a tour card through Q School, with his first being in England and the rest in Asia.

=== 2025–26 season ===
In June 2025, he made his professional debut in the first round of qualifying for the 2025 Wuhan Open, where he was defeated by former world champion Mark Williams. He reached the third round of the 2025 Saudi Arabia Snooker Masters before losing to Englishman Ben Woollaston. In April 2026, he lost to Lan Yuhao in the first round of qualifying for the 2026 World Snooker Championship.

=== 2026-27 ===
In his first match of the season on 10 June 2026, Nasa won his opening match in qualifying for the 2026 China Open, coming from 4-0 down to beat Liam Davies 6-5. In August, he reached the main draw of the 2026 British Open with a win against Ryan Day. The following month, Nasa qualified to play defending champion Chris Wakelin in the main draw at the 2026 Scottish Open.

== Performance and rankings timeline ==
Tournament	2025/ 26	2026/ 27
Ranking (Note: It shows the ranking at the beginning of the season)	(Note: New players on the Main Tour don't have a ranking)	91
Ranking tournaments
Championship League	A	RR
China Open	NH	LQ
Wuhan Open	LQ	LQ
British Open	LQ	1R
English Open	LQ	LQ
Shenzhen Open (Note: The event was called the Xi'an Grand Prix (2025/2026))	LQ	LQ
Northern Ireland Open	LQ	LQ
International Championship	LQ	
UK Championship	LQ	LQ
Shoot Out	1R	
Scottish Open	LQ	
German Masters	LQ	
Welsh Open	LQ	
World Grand Prix	DNQ	
Players Championship	DNQ	
World Open	LQ	
Tour Championship	DNQ	
World Championship	LQ	
Former ranking tournaments
Saudi Arabia Masters	3R	NH

Performance Table Legend
LQ	lost in the qualifying draw	#R	lost in the early rounds of the tournament (WR = Wildcard round, RR = Round robin)	QF	lost in the quarter-finals
SF	lost in the semi-finals	F	lost in the final	W	won the tournament
DNQ	did not qualify for the tournament	A	did not participate in the tournament	WD	withdrew from the tournament

NH / Not Held	means an event was not held.
NR / Non-Ranking Event	means an event is/was no longer a ranking event.
R / Ranking Event	means an event is/was a ranking event.
MR / Minor-Ranking Event	means an event is/was a minor-ranking event.
