= Liam Pullen =

English snooker player (born 2005)

Personal information
- Nickname: The Machine
- Born: 11 July 2005 (age 21)

Sport
- Country: England
- Sport: Snooker
- Professional: 2023–present
- Highest ranking: 66 (July 2026)
- Current ranking: 69 (as of 26 October 2026)
- Maximum breaks: 1
- Best ranking finish: Quarter-finals (2025 Xi'an Grand Prix)

Liam Pullen (born 11 July 2005) is an English professional snooker player from Yorkshire. In April 2023 he became the England under-18 snooker champion. He began playing professionally on the World Snooker Tour from the 2023–24 snooker season.

== Career ==
From York, Pullen made his debut at Q School in 2021 as a fifteen year-old and his performances included a win over former professional James Cahill. In July 2022 he made his first maximum break, while practising in Leeds.

Pullen reached the final the WSF Junior Snooker Championship held in Sydney, Australia in February 2023, with a highest break of 143. In the final he lost to his compatriot Stan Moody. In March 2023, he reached the final of 2023 EBSA European Snooker Championships in Malta where he was defeated by Hungarian Bulcsú Révész.

In April 2023 Pullen won the English under-18 title defeating Oliver Sykes 4–2 in the final. In April, Pullen won through to face Leeds’ Daniel Womersley in the final of the Yorkshire Snooker Championship, held at the Northern Snooker Centre. That month he also retained his Yorkshire under-19 title.

Pullen came back from a 3–0 deficit to defeat Craig Steadman 4–3, playing as a 17-year-old at the 2023 Q School. His performances led him to earning a two-year card on the World Snooker Tour from the 2023–24 snooker season.

=== 2023/24 season ===
Pullen made his professional debut in the draw for the 2023 Championship League held at the Morningside Arena in Leicester, England from 26 June 2023. In his opening match he was defeated by world number 31 Chris Wakelin. In the round-robin phase he drew with Oliver Lines, and recorded his first professional win, over Ukraine's Anton Kazakov. Pullen recorded the biggest win of his career when he defeated former world champion Graeme Dott in qualifying for the 2023 International Championship in September 2023. He followed up that win by defeating Noppon Saengkham in a decider at the event in Tianjin to reach the last-32 of a ranking event for the first time. He also reached the last-32 of the 2023 Snooker Shoot Out in December 2023. Later that month, he qualified for the 2024 German Masters with a win over former world champion Stuart Bingham. His performances that season included qualifying for the 2024 Welsh Open with a 4–0 win over Rebecca Kenna, and a win in the first round of qualifying for the 2024 World Snooker Championship 10–3 against Kazakov.

=== 2024/25 season ===
He was on the receiving end of a maximum break against Chinese opponent Fan Zhengyi at the English Open in September 2024. In December 2024 he reached the last-16 of the 2024 Snooker Shoot Out with a victory over former world champion Neil Robertson. He finished the season ranked No. 98 and had to play at Q School to regain his tour card, which he successfully did at event one in May 2025 with victory in the final round over German Umut Dikme.

=== 2025/26 season ===
He lost in the group stage of the 2025 Championship League in Leicester in July 2025 against Joe O'Connor and Zak Surety, but won 3–1 against Andrew Pagett to place third. He reached the quarter finals of the 2025 Xi'an Grand Prix, recording a 5–3 win over John Higgins, and a 5–0 win over Noppon Saengkham. That month, he defeated Ben Mertens 4–0 in the first qualifying round of the 2025 Northern Ireland Open, and set a new personal high break of 143 during the tournament.

Pullen made his first professional career 147 maximum break during a 6–1 win over Kaylan Patel at the 2025 UK Championship, before defeating Jordan Brown. He was then defeated 6–5 by former World Champion Stuart Bingham in the third round. In February 2026, he recorded a win over top-16 player Chris Wakelin at the 2026 Welsh Open. In April he came through 10–9 against Alfie Burden from 1–5 down in the first round of qualifying for the 2026 World Snooker Championship, before defeating Amir Sarkhosh of Iran 10–7. He defeated Thai player Thepchaiya Un-Nooh to set up a final qualifying round match against Noppon Saengkham, winning 10-8 to qualify for his debut at The Crucible. In the first round of the main draw, he was defeated 10-6 by seeded player Chris Wakelin.

=== 2026/27 ===
In September, he whitewashed Ben Woollaston to reach the main draw at the 2026 Northern Ireland Open, and defeated Artemijs Zizins 4-0 to reach the main draw at the 2026 Scottish Open.

== Personal life ==
From Yorkshire, his practice facilities include the Northern Snooker Centre in Leeds where he has practised with local professional players such as Peter Lines and Oliver Lines, with whom he also goes running.

== Performance and rankings timeline ==
Tournament	2022/ 23	2023/ 24	2024/ 25	2025/ 26	2026/ 27
Ranking (Note: It shows the ranking at the beginning of the season)	(Note: He was an amateur)	(Note: New players on the Main Tour don't have a ranking)	81	(Note: Players qualified through the Q School started the season without ranking points)	66
Ranking tournaments
Championship League	A	RR	RR	RR	RR
China Open	Tournament Not Held				LQ
Wuhan Open	NH	LQ	LQ	LQ	LQ
British Open	A	LQ	LQ	LQ	LQ
English Open	A	1R	LQ	1R	LQ
Shenzhen Open (Note: The event was called the Xi'an Grand Prix (2024/2025–2025/2026))	Not Held		LQ	QF	LQ
Northern Ireland Open	A	LQ	LQ	LQ	1R
International Championship	NH	2R	LQ	LQ	
UK Championship	A	LQ	LQ	LQ	
Shoot Out	A	3R	4R	1R	
Scottish Open	A	LQ	LQ	1R	
German Masters	A	1R	LQ	LQ	
Welsh Open	A	1R	LQ	2R	
World Grand Prix	DNQ	DNQ	DNQ	DNQ	
Players Championship	DNQ	DNQ	DNQ	DNQ	
World Open	NH	LQ	LQ	LQ	
Tour Championship	DNQ	DNQ	DNQ	DNQ	
World Championship	LQ	LQ	LQ	1R	
Former ranking tournaments
European Masters	A	LQ	Not Held		
Saudi Arabia Masters	Not Held		2R	2R	NH

Performance Table Legend
LQ	lost in the qualifying draw	#R	lost in the early rounds of the tournament (WR = Wildcard round, RR = Round robin)	QF	lost in the quarter-finals
SF	lost in the semi-finals	F	lost in the final	W	won the tournament
DNQ	did not qualify for the tournament	A	did not participate in the tournament	WD	withdrew from the tournament

NH / Not Held	means an event was not held.
NR / Non-Ranking Event	means an event is/was no longer a ranking event.
R / Ranking Event	means an event is/was a ranking event.
MR / Minor-Ranking Event	means an event is/was a minor-ranking event.

== Career finals ==
=== Amateur finals: 6 (1 title) ===
Outcome	No.	Year	Championship	Opponent in the final	Score
Runner-up	1.	2019	English Under-14 Championship	(England) Stan Moody	4–5
Runner-up	2.	2019	English Under-16 Championship	(England) Paul Deaville	3–6
Runner-up	3.	2022	EPSB Open Series - Cueball - Event 2	(England) Hayden Staniland	2–3
Runner-up	4.	2023	WSF Junior Open	(England) Stan Moody	1–5
Runner-up	5.	2023	EBSA European Under-18 Snooker Championships	(Hungary) Bulcsú Révész	3–4
Winner	1.	2023	English Under-18 Championship	(England) Oliver Sykes	4–2
