= Zhao Hanyang =

Chinese snooker player (born 1999)

Personal information
- Born: 20 October 1999 (age 27)

Sport
- Country: China
- Sport: Snooker
- Professional: 2025–
- Highest ranking: 81 (July 2026)
- Current ranking: 85 (as of 7 November 2026)
- Best ranking finish: Last 64 (2025 Wuhan Open)

Zhao Hanyang (born 20 October 1999) is a Chinese professional snooker player. He won a two-year card on the World Snooker Tour starting with the 2025–26 snooker season.

== Early life ==
He is from the city of Xi'an in Shaanxi province. He started playing snooker at the age of eight years-old. His family later moved to Guangdong province where he would practise with Zhou Yuelong and Zhao Xintong and was coached by Wu Wenzhong, who had previously mentored Ding Jinhui, amongst others.

== Career ==
Prior to joining the main tour, Zhao participated in three Asian Tour events as a local wildcard. In 2013, he competed in Asian Tour Event 1 where he lost in the qualifying round to Yuan Sijun. In the following season, he competed in Asian Tour Event 2, where he lost in the first round to Oliver Lines. He then competed in a standalone Asian Tour event in 2015 where he reached round two, having beaten fellow local wildcard players Cheng Feng and Lyu Chenwei, before losing by whitewash to Leo Fernandez.

In June 2021, at the Chinese national team championship he played as a member of the Dongguan Team under coach Jin Di alongside team members Liu Hongyu and Liang Xiaolong.

Competing at the Asia-Oceania Q School Event 1 in Thailand in May 2025, he lost to Chatchapong Nasa in the penultimate round. At event two, Zhao defeated former professional Rory Thor on a deciding frame, and Narongdat Takantong of Thailand 4–1 in the final round to earn a two-year card on the World Snooker Tour from the 2025-26 snooker season.

=== 2025–26 season ===
He made a winning start to his professional career, recording a 5–1 win over Sanderson Lam in his first game as a professional in qualifying for the 2025 Wuhan Open. His round-robin group in the 2025 Championship League in Leicester on 30 June 2025, saw him earn 2-2 draws against compatriot Yao Pengcheng and Welshman Jamie Jones, but have a 3–1 loss to Lyu Haotian.

== Performance and rankings timeline ==
Tournament	2025/ 26	2026/ 27
Ranking (Note: It shows the ranking at the beginning of the season)	(Note: New players on the Main Tour don't have a ranking)	81
Ranking tournaments
Championship League	RR	RR
China Open	NH	LQ
Wuhan Open	1R	LQ
British Open	LQ	LQ
English Open	1R	LQ
Shenzhen Open (Note: The event was called the Xi'an Grand Prix (2025/2026))	LQ	LQ
Northern Ireland Open	LQ	LQ
International Championship	LQ	LQ
UK Championship	LQ	
Shoot Out	1R	
Scottish Open	LQ	
German Masters	LQ	LQ
Welsh Open	LQ	
World Grand Prix	DNQ	
Players Championship	DNQ	
World Open	1R	
Tour Championship	DNQ	
World Championship	LQ	
Former ranking tournaments
Saudi Arabia Masters	2R	NH

Performance Table Legend
LQ	lost in the qualifying draw	#R	lost in the early rounds of the tournament (WR = Wildcard round, RR = Round robin)	QF	lost in the quarter-finals
SF	lost in the semi-finals	F	lost in the final	W	won the tournament
DNQ	did not qualify for the tournament	A	did not participate in the tournament	WD	withdrew from the tournament

NH / Not Held	means an event was not held.
NR / Non-Ranking Event	means an event is/was no longer a ranking event.
R / Ranking Event	means an event is/was a ranking event.
MR / Minor-Ranking Event	means an event is/was a minor-ranking event.
