= Connor Benzey =

English snooker player

Personal information
- Nickname: The Mercedes
- Born: 13 February 2002 (age 24)

Sport
- Country: England
- Sport: Snooker
- Professional: 2025-present
- Highest ranking: 89 (July 2026)
- Current ranking: 104 (as of 7 November 2026)
- Best ranking finish: Last 112 (2025 Saudi Arabia Snooker Masters)

Connor Benzey (born 13 February 2002) is an English professional snooker player. He has earned a two-year card on the World Snooker Tour starting with the 2025–26 snooker season.

== Career ==
From Southampton, he played as a youngster at Chandlers Ford Snooker Club. He is son of the local snooker player Mark who won the Southampton snooker singles championship in 1980. He won the European U17 title in Malta in 2019. He finished second in the 2020 EPSB Under-21 Premier Development Tour and reached the last 16 of the World Snooker Federation Open in Malta. He beat Fraser Patrick to reach the last-64 at the 2020 English Open in Milton Keynes in October 2020, before being beaten by John Higgins. He entered Q School in 2020 entered Q School in 2020, he lost in the first round of all three events. In the three following years at Q School his best result was reaching the last-64. In 2024, he managed to reach the last-32 of both Q School events.

A top-up player from the Q School order of merit competing as an amateur at the 2024 Championship League in Leicester, in June 2024, Benzey performed with credit going unbeaten in his round-robin group that included a draw with former world champion Mark Williams, as well as wins against Northern Ireland's Fergal Quinn and professional David Grace. He was defeated by Mark Joyce in the quarterfinals of the Q Tour Global Play-Offs in Antalya in March 2025. He entered Q School in May 2025, reaching the final round of event two with a win against former professional John Astley, where he faced Rodion Judin of Latvia. A 4-2 win earned a two-year card on the World Snooker Tour, starting with the 2025–26 snooker season.

=== 2025-present ===
He made his professional debut against former world champion Kyren Wilson at the 2025 Wuhan Open, losing 5-0. He was drawn in the round-robin stage of the 2025 Championship League against Mark Davis, Sam Craigie and Jimmy Robertson, earning a 2-2 draw with group-winner Craigie. On 11 December he recorded a win against Chris Totten at the 2025 Snooker Shoot Out. In April, he recorded a 10-6 win over Haris Tahir of Pakistan in the first round of qualifying for the 2026 World Snooker Championship before losing to Antoni Kowalski. In September, Benzey recorded a win over Anton Kazakov at the 2026 Scottish Open.

== Performance and rankings timeline ==
Tournament	2019/ 20	2020/ 21	2024/ 25	2025/ 26	2026/ 27
Ranking (Note: It shows the ranking at the beginning of the season)	(Note: He was an amateur)			(Note: New players on the Main Tour don't have a ranking)	88
Ranking tournaments
Championship League	NR	A	RR	RR	A
China Open	Tournament Not Held				LQ
Wuhan Open	Not Held		A	LQ	LQ
British Open	Not Held		A	LQ	LQ
English Open	A	2R	A	LQ	LQ
Shenzhen Open (Note: The event was called the Xi'an Grand Prix (2024/2025–2025/2026))	Not Held		A	LQ	LQ
Northern Ireland Open	A	A	A	LQ	LQ
International Championship	A	NH	A	LQ	LQ
UK Championship	A	A	A	LQ	LQ
Shoot Out	A	2R	A	2R	
Scottish Open	A	A	A	LQ	LQ
German Masters	A	A	A	LQ	LQ
Welsh Open	A	A	A	LQ	
World Grand Prix	DNQ	DNQ	DNQ	DNQ	
Players Championship	DNQ	DNQ	DNQ	DNQ	
World Open	A	NH	A	LQ	
Tour Championship	DNQ	DNQ	DNQ	DNQ	
World Championship	LQ	LQ	A	LQ	
Former ranking tournaments
Saudi Arabia Masters	Not Held		A	2R	NH

Performance Table Legend
LQ	lost in the qualifying draw	#R	lost in the early rounds of the tournament (WR = Wildcard round, RR = Round robin)	QF	lost in the quarter-finals
SF	lost in the semi-finals	F	lost in the final	W	won the tournament
DNQ	did not qualify for the tournament	A	did not participate in the tournament	WD	withdrew from the tournament

NH / Not Held	means an event was not held.
NR / Non-Ranking Event	means an event is/was no longer a ranking event.
R / Ranking Event	means an event is/was a ranking event.
MR / Minor-Ranking Event	means an event is/was a minor-ranking event.

== Career finals ==
=== Amateur finals: 2 (2 titles) ===
Outcome	No.	Year	Championship	Opponent in the final	Score
Winner	1.	2022	EPSB Open Series - Crucible - Event 1	(England) Hamim Hussain	3–0
Winner	2.	2024	EPSB Open Series - Frames - Event 2	(England) Marcos Dayao	3–2
