= Deng Haohui =

Chinese snooker player (born 2002)

Personal information
- Born: 13 October 2002 (age 24)

Sport
- Country: China
- Sport: Snooker
- Highest ranking: 109 (August 2026)
- Current ranking: 115 (as of 7 November 2026)

Deng Haohui (born 13 October 2002) is a Chinese snooker player. He won the 2026 Asian Snooker Championships. By making it to the final of Asia-Oceania Q School event one he has achieved a two-year card on the World Snooker Tour, from the 2026–27 snooker season.

== Career ==
Competing in Doha, Deng Haohui won the ACBS Asian Snooker Championship in February 2026, defeating the defending champion, Pankaj Advani, 4–1 in the final.

In May 2026, he reached the late stages of the Asia-Oceania Q School event one, defeating Pakistan's Mubashir Raza 4–2 in the penultimate round before facing former professional Amir Sarkhosh of Iran, winning 4–1, which earned him a two-year card on the World Snooker Tour, from the 2026–27 snooker season.

== Performance and rankings timeline ==
Tournament	2023/ 24	2026/ 27
Ranking (Note: It shows the ranking at the beginning of the season)	(Note: He was an amateur)	(Note: New players on the Main Tour don't have a ranking)
Ranking tournaments
Championship League	A	RR
China Open	NH	LQ
Wuhan Open	A	LQ
British Open	A	LQ
English Open	A	LQ
Shenzhen Open	NH	LQ
Northern Ireland Open	A	LQ
International Championship	A	LQ
UK Championship	A	
Shoot Out	A	
Scottish Open	A	
German Masters	A	LQ
Welsh Open	A	
World Grand Prix	DNQ	
Players Championship	DNQ	
World Open	A	
Tour Championship	DNQ	
World Championship	A	
Non-ranking tournaments
Shanghai Masters	1R	

Performance Table Legend
LQ	lost in the qualifying draw	#R	lost in the early rounds of the tournament (WR = Wildcard round, RR = Round robin)	QF	lost in the quarter-finals
SF	lost in the semi-finals	F	lost in the final	W	won the tournament
DNQ	did not qualify for the tournament	A	did not participate in the tournament	WD	withdrew from the tournament

NH / Not Held	means an event was not held
NR / Non-Ranking Event	means an event is/was no longer a ranking event
R / Ranking Event	means an event is/was a ranking event
MR / Minor-Ranking Event	means an event is/was a minor-ranking event
