= English Open (snooker) =

Snooker tournament

- Part of the Home Nations Series

Tournament information
- Venue: Brentwood Centre
- Location: Brentwood
- Country: England
- Established: 2016
- Organisation(s): World Snooker Tour
- Format: Ranking event
- Total prize fund: £550,400
- Winner's share: £100,000
- Recent edition: 2026
- Current champion: Ali Carter (ENG)

The English Open is a professional ranking snooker tournament held in Brentwood, as part of the four-event Home Nations Series. The winner is awarded the Steve Davis Trophy, named in honour of the English six-time world champion. The reigning champion is Ali Carter.

== History ==
On 29 April 2015, World Snooker chairman Barry Hearn announced that a new event called the "English Open" would be held for the first time in 2016 in Manchester, England, as part of a new Home Nations Series, with the existing Welsh Open and Scottish Open and the new Northern Ireland Open tournaments. The inaugural event took place between 10 and 16 October 2016, and was won by Liang Wenbo.

After relocations to Barnsley, Crawley and Milton Keynes, the tournament was subsequently played at the Brentwood Centre in Brentwood, Essex since 2022; Steve Dawson, the chairman of WST, has claimed Essex to be the "root" of the game, hence the choice of the venue. It also coincides with the birthplace of Hearn's Matchroom Sport, the main promoter of snooker, founded in Brentwood back in 1982.

A separate qualification event for the tournament was removed for the 2024 and 2025 editions, where all matches from round one were staged at the main venue.

== Winners ==
| Year | Winner | Runner-up | Final score | Venue | City | Season |
|---|---|---|---|---|---|---|
| 2016 | Liang Wenbo (CHN) | Judd Trump (ENG) | 9–6 | EventCity | Manchester | 2016/17 |
| 2017 | Ronnie O'Sullivan (ENG) | Kyren Wilson (ENG) | 9–2 | Barnsley Metrodome | Barnsley | 2017/18 |
| 2018 | Stuart Bingham (ENG) | Mark Davis (ENG) | 9–7 | K2 | Crawley | 2018/19 |
| 2019 | Mark Selby (ENG) | David Gilbert (ENG) | 9–1 | K2 | Crawley | 2019/20 |
| 2020 | Judd Trump (ENG) | Neil Robertson (AUS) | 9–8 | Marshall Arena | Milton Keynes | 2020/21 |
| 2021 | Neil Robertson (AUS) | John Higgins (SCO) | 9–8 | Marshall Arena | Milton Keynes | 2021/22 |
| 2022 | Mark Selby (ENG) | Luca Brecel (BEL) | 9–6 | Brentwood Centre | Brentwood | 2022/23 |
| 2023 | Judd Trump (ENG) | Zhang Anda (CHN) | 9–7 | Brentwood Centre | Brentwood | 2023/24 |
| 2024 | Neil Robertson (AUS) | Wu Yize (CHN) | 9–7 | Brentwood Centre | Brentwood | 2024/25 |
| 2025 | Mark Allen (NIR) | Zhou Yuelong (CHN) | 9–8 | Brentwood Centre | Brentwood | 2025/26 |
| 2026 | Ali Carter (ENG) | Mark Williams (WAL) | 9–6 | Brentwood Centre | Brentwood | 2026/27 |

== Finalists ==
| Name | Nationality | Winner | Runner-up | Finals |
|---|---|---|---|---|
| **Judd Trump** | England | 2 | 1 | 3 |
| **Neil Robertson** | Australia | 2 | 1 | 3 |
| **Mark Selby** | England | 2 | 0 | 2 |
| Liang Wenbo | China | 1 | 0 | 1 |
| **Ronnie O'Sullivan** | England | 1 | 0 | 1 |
| **Stuart Bingham** | England | 1 | 0 | 1 |
| **Mark Allen** | Northern Ireland | 1 | 0 | 1 |
| **Ali Carter** | England | 1 | 0 | 1 |
| **Kyren Wilson** | England | 0 | 1 | 1 |
| Mark Davis | England | 0 | 1 | 1 |
| **David Gilbert** | England | 0 | 1 | 1 |
| **John Higgins** | Scotland | 0 | 1 | 1 |
| **Luca Brecel** | Belgium | 0 | 1 | 1 |
| **Zhang Anda** | China | 0 | 1 | 1 |
| **Wu Yize** | China | 0 | 1 | 1 |
| **Zhou Yuelong** | China | 0 | 1 | 1 |
| **Mark Williams** | Wales | 0 | 1 | 1 |

Legend
The names of active players are marked in **bold**.
