= 2026 Shenzhen Open =

Snooker tournament

Tournament information
- Dates: 28 September – 4 October 2026
- Venue: Bao'an Sports Centre
- City: Shenzhen
- Country: China
- Organisation: World Snooker Tour
- Format: Ranking event
- Total prize fund: £850,000
- Winner's share: £177,000
- Highest break: Chang Bingyu (CHN) (147)

Final
- Champion: Wu Yize (CHN)
- Runner-up: Yuan Sijun (CHN)
- Score: 10–5

The 2026 Shenzhen Open was a professional snooker tournament that took place from 28 September to 4 October 2026 at the Bao'an Sports Centre in Shenzhen, China. Formerly staged in Xi'an as the Xi'an Grand Prix, the tournament was relocated and rebranded as the Shenzhen Open for the 2026 edition. Qualifying took place from 19 to 22 July at the Leicester Arena in Leicester, England. The third consecutive edition of the tournament since its inaugural staging in 2024, it was the sixth ranking event of the 2026–27 snooker season, following the 2026 English Open and preceding the 2026 Northern Ireland Open. The winner received £177,000 from a total prize fund of £850,000.

Mark Williams was the defending champion, having defeated Shaun Murphy 10–3 in the 2025 final, but he was beaten by Fan Zhengyi in the last 64.

Wu Yize won the tournament, beating Yuan Sijun 10–5 in the final.

== Overview ==
The Shenzhen Open was a professional ranking snooker tournament held in China. The first two editions, in 2024 and 2025, were staged in Xi'an as the Xi'an Grand Prix. Kyren Wilson won the inaugural edition, defeating Judd Trump 10–8 in the final. The 2026 edition—for which the tournament was relocated to Shenzhen and rebranded as the Shenzhen Open—took place from 28 September to 4 October. Qualifying took place from 19 to 22 July at the Leicester Arena in Leicester, England. The tournament was the sixth ranking event of the 2026–27 snooker season, following the 2026 English Open and preceding the 2026 Northern Ireland Open.

All matches were the best of nine frames up to the semi-finals, which were the best of eleven frames. The final was a best of 19 frame match, played over two sessions.

There was a river cruise on 27 September after the opening ceremony.

Mark Williams was the defending champion, having defeated Shaun Murphy 10–3 in the 2025 final, but he was beaten 4–5 by Fan Zhengyi in the last 64.

Wu Yize won the tournament, beating Yuan Sijun 10–5 in the final.

There were 112 century breaks made during the event, with 56 mage during qualifying and 56 at the main venue. The highest break was a 147 made by Chang Bingyu during qualifying.

=== Prize fund ===
The prize fund for the tournament is detailed below.

- Winner: £177,000
- Runner-up: £76,000
- Semi-final: £34,500
- Quarter-final: £22,350
- Last 16: £12,500
- Last 32: £8,250
- Last 64: £4,700
- Last 96: £1,600
- Highest break: £5,000
- Total: £850,000

== Summary ==
=== Qualifying ===
==== Qualifying round 2 ====
Chang Bingyu made the third maximum break of his professional career in the fourth frame of his 5–0 victory over Chatchapong Nasa, along with three other century breaks of 109, 134, and 135. It was the 244th official maximum.

==== Qualifying round 3 ====
Mark Allen withdrew and so Ben Mertens received a walkover to the last 32.

=== Later rounds ===
==== Last 64 ====
The defending champion Mark Williams was defeated 4–5 by Fan Zhengyi, Neil Robertson beat Liu Hongyu 5–2, and Judd Trump whitewashed Huang Jiahao. Scott Donaldson defeated the world number one Zhao Xintong 5–4, Jiang Jun beat Ronnie O'Sullivan 5–2, Chris Wakelin beat Liam Davies 5–3, and Si Jiahui beat Oliver Lines 5–1.

Kyren Wilson beat Sam Craigie 5–1, Shaun Murphy beat Marco Fu, also by 5–1, David Grace defeated John Higgins 5–4, and Barry Hawkins beat Liam Highfield 5–3. Wu Yize defeated Jamie Clarke 5–4, Mark Selby beat Andrew Higginson 5–3, Michael Holt defeated Xiao Guodong 5–4, and Ricky Walden beat Ding Junhui, also by 5–4.

==== Last 32 ====
Anthony McGill withdrew and so Judd Trump received a walkover to the last 16.

Jimmy Robertson beat Mertens 5–1, Zak Surety beat Jiang 5–3, Neil Robertson beat Lei Peifan 5–1, and Donaldson defeated Pang Junxu 5–4, in a match decided on the final black. In the second frame, Pang became the 93rd player to reach 100 career century breaks. Stephen Maguire beat Grace 5–1, Kyren Wilson beat David Gilbert 5–2, and Murphy beat Hossein Vafaei 5–1. Wakelin beat Stuart Bingham and Holt beat Thepchaiya Un-Nooh, both by whitewashes.

Selby beat Jackson Page 5–1, making three century breaks of 132, 135 and 138, and Si beat Gary Wilson 5–3, making two century breaks of 127 and 119. Yuan Sijun beat Fan 5–1, Elliot Slessor beat Hawkins 5–2, Wu beat Xu Si 5–3 and Walden defeated Ali Carter 5–4.

==== Last 16 ====
The last 16 matches were played on 1 October as the best of nine frames.

Jimmy Robertson whitewashed Donaldson, Holt beat Kyren Wilson 5–2, Wakelin beat Neil Robertson, also by 5–2, and Selby beat Maguire 5–3.

Murphy beat Slessor 5–1, Yuan beat Surety 5–2, Trump beat Si, also by 5–2, and Wu beat Walden 5–3.

==== Quarter-finals ====
The quarter-finals were played on 2 October as the best of nine frames.

Trump whitewashed Selby, and Jimmy Robertson beat Wakelin 5–3.

Yuan beat Holt 5–2, and Wu defeated Murphy 5–4.

==== Semi-finals ====
The semi-finals were played on 3 October as the best of 11 frames.

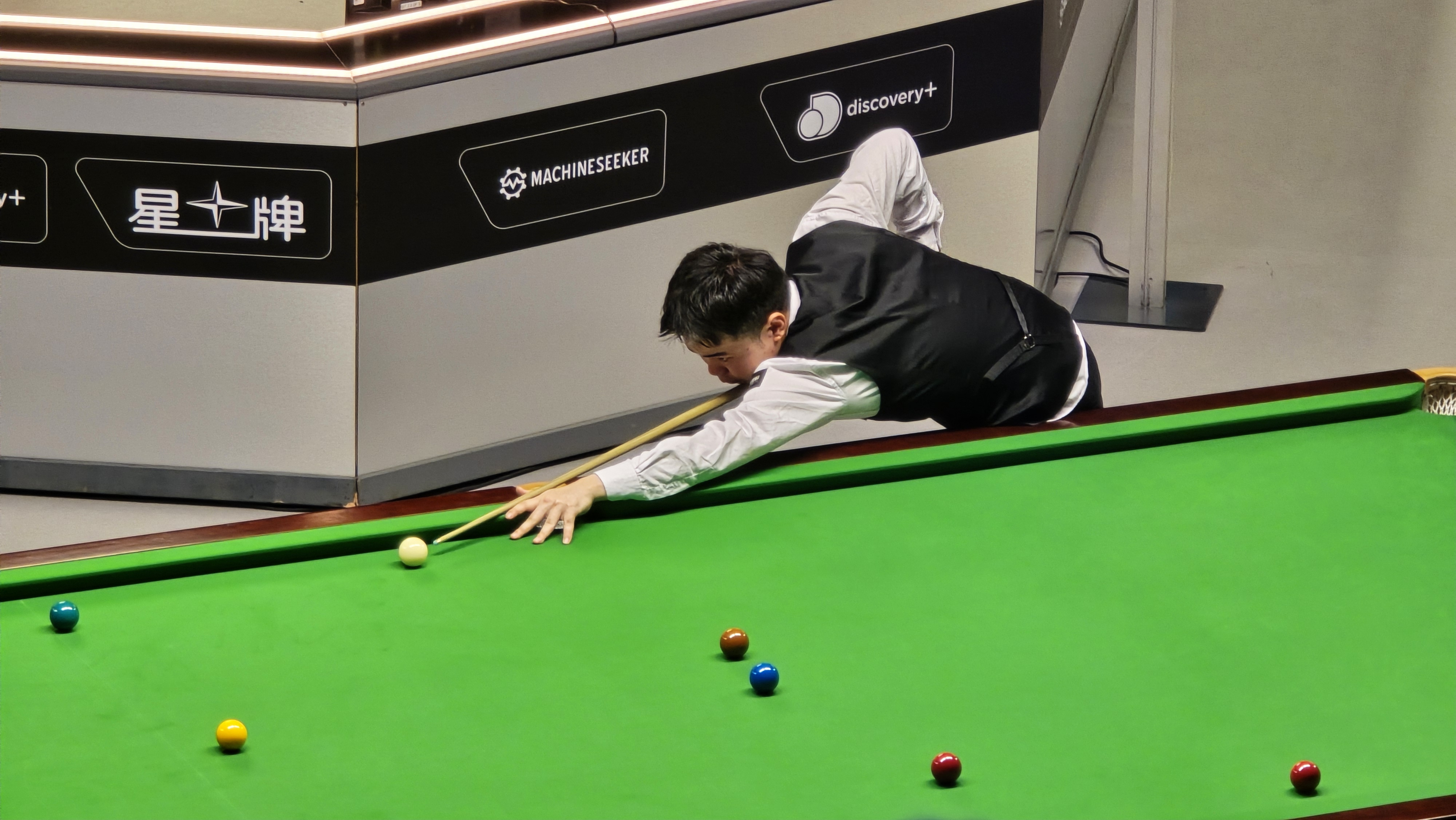
Yuan Sijun (pictured in 2025) beat Jimmy Robertson 6–5.

In the afternoon session, Yuan beat Robertson 6–5 to reach his first ranking final. After the match Yuan said: "The pressure was huge throughout the whole match, right from the moment I came out to play. I could feel that I was playing completely differently compared with the previous few matches. Although I kept telling myself not to think about it, sometimes your brain just instinctively and subconsciously goes back to those thoughts. There were so many different feelings mixed together. There is happiness, but also the sense of how difficult it has been and all the struggles over the years. I suppose, in a way, this is a little bit of an answer to myself after all these years. So many emotions came together, and in the end, I probably just couldn't quite control them."

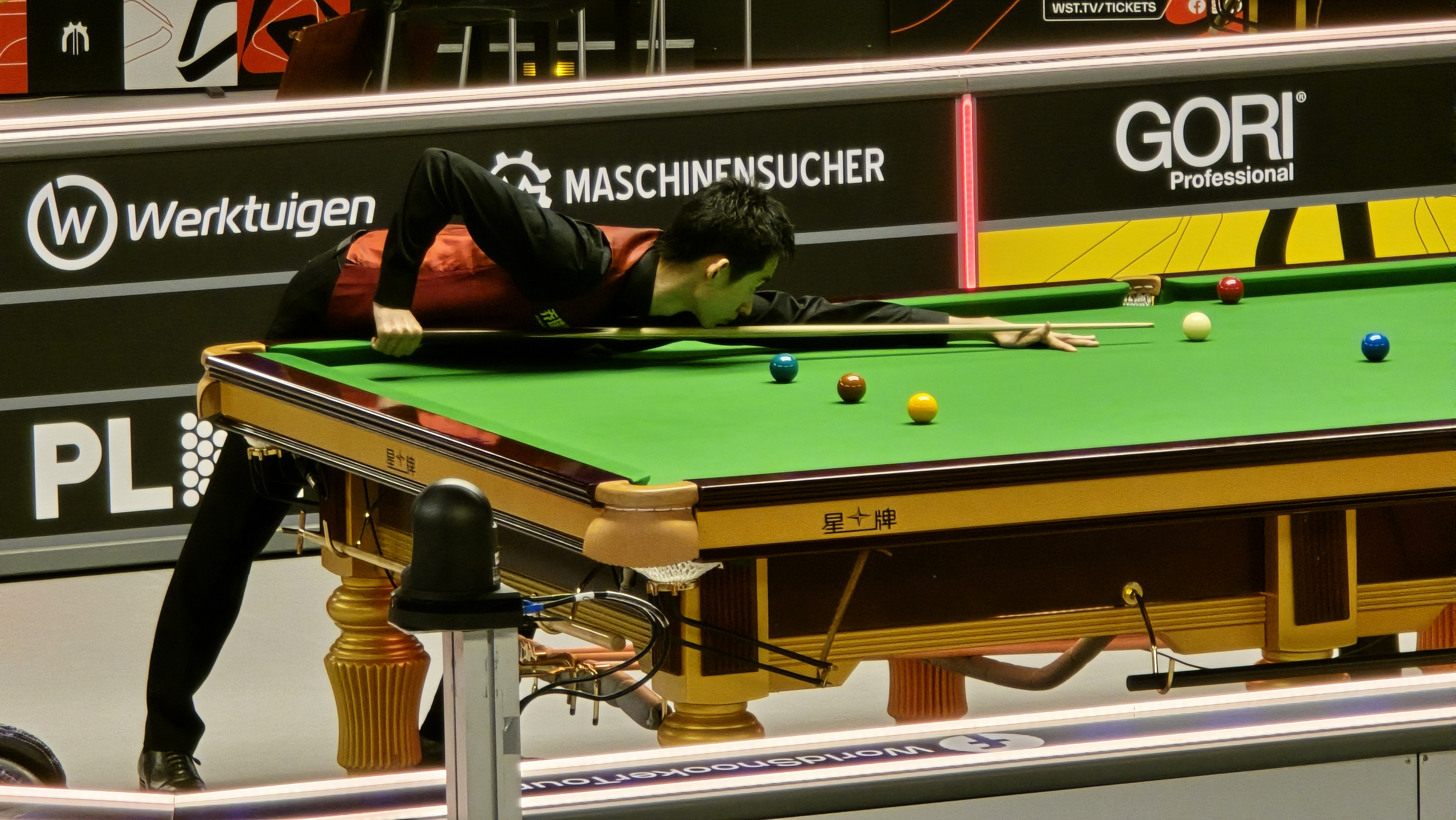
Wu Yize (pictured in 2025) beat Judd Trump 6–1.

In the evening session, Wu beat Trump 6–1. After the match Wu said: "This was the best safety performance of my professional career. It would have been nice if I could have been a little more fluent in scoring. This match was also very important for my career. To be able to perform at this level in terms of safety play is very satisfying. Playing Judd [Trump] is always very straightforward in one sense. Even though I won six frames in a row, he put me under a huge amount of pressure in every frame. I needed to perform well in every aspect because it's very difficult to get easy chances from him."

==== Final ====
The final was played on 4 October as the best of 19 frames, played over two sessions. Yuan faced Wu.

At the end of the afternoon session, Wu led Yuan 5–4. Wu went on to win the match, and the tournament, 10–5. After the match, Wu said: "This time I was able to be a little more composed than I was in winning my previous two titles, I've grown both physically and mentally compared with before. I just hope I can continue to get better from here and keep pushing myself to break through. Maybe the pressure at the World Championship had become so great that I forgot how to enjoy it, I was completely immersed in the competition. Perhaps the happiness was still there, but I had already buried it somewhere deep inside. I wanted to prove myself again. There have definitely been a lot of voices around me recently, and I felt that I needed to keep improving, win another title and keep pushing myself towards my peak. So this is another breakthrough for me. Today Yuan [Sijun] put me under a lot of pressure in the first session. The turning point was probably the eighth frame, I had already prepared myself for being 5–3 behind. In the second session, he was probably under a little bit of pressure as well." Yuan said: "Overall, I think it was a pretty good performance. I played quite well in the first half of the tournament, but over the final two days I didn’t perform at the level I know I'm capable of, so hopefully I can do better next time. I just didn't play very well tonight and I wasn't able to put him [Wu] under enough pressure. I really wasn't nervous at all today. I just felt like my whole body was completely out of sorts. I felt really uncomfortable, and no matter how I tried to aim or strike the ball, it just didn't feel right. So the whole day was actually quite frustrating for me."

As a result of the win, Wu moved from fourth to second in the world rankings, while Yuan moved from 33rd to 26th.

== Main draw ==
The draw for the tournament is shown below. Numbers in the column to the left of the players' names denote the players' seeding and players in bold denote match winners.

**Last 32**; Best of 9 frames
57	Fan Zhengyi (CHN)	1
**30**	**Yuan Sijun (CHN)**	**5**
65	Jiang Jun (CHN)	3
**42**	**Zak Surety (ENG)**	**5**
18	Thepchaiya Un-Nooh (THA)	0
**51**	**Michael Holt (ENG)**	**5**
31	David Gilbert (ENG)	2
**8**	**Kyren Wilson (ENG)**	**5**
**55**	**Scott Donaldson (SCO)**	**5**
25	Pang Junxu (CHN)	4
62 (Note: Mark Allen withdrew and so Ben Mertens received a walkover to the last 32.)	Ben Mertens (BEL)	1
**33**	**Jimmy Robertson (ENG)**	**5**
21	Stuart Bingham (ENG)	0
**13**	**Chris Wakelin (ENG)**	**5**
26	Lei Peifan (CHN)	1
**4**	**Neil Robertson (AUS)**	**5**
**3**	**Judd Trump (ENG)**	**w/o**
38 (Note: Anthony McGill withdrew and so Judd Trump was given a walkover to the last 16.)	Anthony McGill (SCO)	w/d
**16**	**Si Jiahui (CHN)**	**5**
24	Gary Wilson (ENG)	3
35	Jackson Page (WAL)	1
**9**	**Mark Selby (ENG)**	**5**
**29**	**Stephen Maguire (SCO)**	**5**
74	David Grace (ENG)	1
**7**	**Shaun Murphy (ENG)**	**5**
28	Hossein Vafaei (IRN)	1
10	Barry Hawkins (ENG)	2
**19**	**Elliot Slessor (ENG)**	**5**
22	Ali Carter (ENG)	4
**54**	**Ricky Walden (ENG)**	**5**
34	Xu Si (CHN)	3
**2**	**Wu Yize (CHN)**	**5**

**Last 16**; Best of 9 frames
**(China) Yuan Sijun**	**5**
(England) Zak Surety	2
**(England) Michael Holt**	**5**
(England) Kyren Wilson	2
(Scotland) Scott Donaldson	0
**(England) Jimmy Robertson**	**5**
**(England) Chris Wakelin**	**5**
(Australia) Neil Robertson	2
**(England) Judd Trump**	**5**
(China) Si Jiahui	2
**(England) Mark Selby**	**5**
(Scotland) Stephen Maguire	3
**(England) Shaun Murphy**	**5**
(England) Elliot Slessor	1
(England) Ricky Walden	3
**(China) Wu Yize**	**5**

**Quarter-finals**; Best of 9 frames
**(China) Yuan Sijun**	**5**
(England) Michael Holt	2
**(England) Jimmy Robertson**	**5**
(England) Chris Wakelin	3
**(England) Judd Trump**	**5**
(England) Mark Selby	0
(England) Shaun Murphy	4
**(China) Wu Yize**	**5**

**Semi-finals**; Best of 11 frames
**(China) Yuan Sijun**	**6**
(England) Jimmy Robertson	5
(England) Judd Trump	1
**(China) Wu Yize**	**6**

**Final**; Best of 19 frames
30	(China) Yuan Sijun	5
**2**	**(China) Wu Yize**	**10**

Note: w/d=withdrawn; w/o=walkover

=== Final: frame scores ===
Final: Best of 19 frames. Referee: Liu Yang (Note: Liu Yang (snooker player) should not be confused with Liu Yang (snooker referee) although their names are the same.); Bao'an Sports Centre, Shenzhen, China, 4 October 2026
Yuan Sijun (30); China	5–**10**	**Wu Yize** (2); China
Afternoon: 4–**123** (117), **128**–0, 1–**121**, 14–**87**, **56**–44, **60**–35, **98**–4, 71–**74**, 27–**75**; Evening: 0–**100**, **60**–7, 29–**82**, 41–**83**, 18–**100**, 45–**77**
(frame 8) 71	Highest break	**117** (frame 1)
0	Century breaks	**1**

== Qualifying draw ==
The results of the qualifying matches are shown below. Numbers in parentheses after the players' names denote the players' seeding, an "a" indicates amateur players who were not on the main World Snooker Tour, and players in bold denote match winners.

=== Pre-qualifying round ===
Two pre-qualifying matches were played in Leicester to determine the opponents of Gao Yang and Alexander Ursenbacher in the qualifying draw respectively.

- Oliver Sykes (ENG) (116) 1–**5** **Andrew Higginson** (ENG) (99)
- **Jamie Clarke** (WAL) (101) **5**–2 Sean O'Sullivan (ENG) (104)

=== Rounds one to three ===
The results of the main qualifying draw are shown below. Matches involving the top 16 seeds, the three Chinese wildcards (Chen Qi'en, Dong Zihao, and Wang Xinzhong), and one wildcard from Hong Kong (Su Jinxiong) were held over to be played in Shenzhen.

**Round 1 (Last 128)**; Best of 9 frames
Ian Burns (ENG) (76) (Note: Ian Burns withdrew and so Jimmy White received a walkover to the last 96.)	w/d
**Jimmy White** (ENG) (94)	**w/o**
**Iulian Boiko (UKR) (71)**	**5**
Phil O'Kane (ENG) (120)	0
**Jiang Jun (CHN) (65)**	**5**
Panchaya Channoi (THA) (123)	3
Liam Graham (SCO) (87)	1
**Craig Steadman (ENG) (103)**	**5**
Liam Pullen (ENG) (66)	3
**Deng Haohui (CHN) (124)**	**5**
**Ross Muir (SCO) (84)**	**5**
Thanawat Tirapongpaiboon (THA) (119)	2
Zhao Hanyang (CHN) (81)	3
**Ashley Hugill (ENG) (108)**	**5**
**Sam Craigie (ENG) (70)**	**5**
Mahmoud El Hareedy (EGY) (97) (Note: Mahmoud El Hareedy did not return after the mid-session interval, with the score at 4–0 to Sam Craigie, and so he forfeited the fifth frame.)	0
Louis Heathcote (ENG) (67)	2
**Wang Xinbo (CHN) (117)**	**5**
Leone Crowley (IRL) (86)	4
**Julien Leclercq (BEL) (114)**	**5**
**Ben Mertens (BEL) (62)**	**5**
Anton Kazakov (UKR) (115)	1
Michał Szubarczyk (POL) (77)	2
**Gong Chenzhi (CHN) (113)**	**5**
**Yao Pengcheng (CHN) (79)**	**5**
Mitchell Mann (ENG) (100)	2
Jamie Jones (WAL) (63)	2
**Liam Davies (WAL) (111)**	**5**
**Steven Hallworth (ENG) (73)**	**5**
Liu Yang (CHN) (126)	4
Oliver Brown (ENG) (92)	2
**Artemijs Žižins (LVA) (118)**	**5**
Liu Wenwei (CHN) (83)	1
**Huang Jiahao (CHN) (107)**	**5**
**Jordan Brown (NIR) (64)**	**5**
Paul Norris (ENG) (121)	2
**Reanne Evans (ENG) (82)**	**5**
Michael Larkov (UKR) (125)	3
Xu Yichen (CHN) (80)	1
**Luo Zetao (CHN) (122)**	**5**
**Dylan Emery (WAL) (72)**	**5**
Bai Yulu (CHN) (112)	4
Gao Yang (CHN) (75)	3
**Andrew Higginson (ENG) (99)**	**5**
**Lan Yuhao (CHN) (78)**	**5**
Ashley Carty (ENG) (106)	3
**David Grace (ENG) (74)**	**5**
Florian Nüßle (AUT) (93)	2
**Marco Fu (HKG) (69)**	**5**
Ng On Yee (HKG) (95)	1
Fergal Quinn (NIR) (90)	0
**Antoni Kowalski (POL) (109)**	**5**
**Liam Highfield (ENG) (68)**	**5**
Hammad Miah (ENG) (105)	1
**Chatchapong Nasa (THA) (91)**	**5**
Sahil Nayyar (CAN) (96)	4
**Lyu Haotian (CHN) (61)**	**5**
Alfie Burden (ENG) (98)	3
Connor Benzey (ENG) (88)	0
**Cheung Ka Wai (HKG) (110)**	**5**
**Mateusz Baranowski (POL) (85)**	**5**
Stuart Carrington (ENG) (102)	3
Alexander Ursenbacher (SUI) (89)	2
**Jamie Clarke (WAL) (101)**	**5**

**Round 2 (Last 96)**; Best of 9 frames
**Fan Zhengyi (CHN) (57)**	**5**
Jimmy White (ENG) (94)	1
Stan Moody (ENG) (40)	2
**Iulian Boiko (UKR) (71)**	**5**
Robbie Williams (ENG) (56)	0
**Jiang Jun (CHN) (65)**	**5**
**Zak Surety (ENG) (42)**	**5**
Craig Steadman (ENG) (103)	2
Tom Ford (ENG) (36)	3
**Deng Haohui (CHN) (124)**	**5**
**Michael Holt (ENG) (51)**	**5**
Ross Muir (SCO) (84)	4
Ryan Day (WAL) (37)	2
**Ashley Hugill (ENG) (108)**	**5**
Su Jinxiong (HKG) (a)^{†}	2
**Sam Craigie (ENG) (70)**	**5**
**Scott Donaldson (SCO) (55)**	**5**
Wang Xinbo (CHN) (117)	2
**Luca Brecel (BEL) (44)**	**5**
Julien Leclercq (BEL) (114)	3
Matthew Stevens (WAL) (49)	1
**Ben Mertens (BEL) (62)**	**5**
**Jimmy Robertson (ENG) (33)**	**5**
Gong Chenzhi (CHN) (113)	0
**Aaron Hill (IRL) (41)**	**5**
Yao Pengcheng (CHN) (79)	2
Ishpreet Singh Chadha (IND) (59)	3
**Liam Davies (WAL) (111)**	**5**
**Matthew Selt (ENG) (43)**	**5**
Steven Hallworth (ENG) (73)	1
**Liu Hongyu (CHN) (58)**	**5**
Artemijs Žižins (LVA) (118)	0
David Lilley (ENG) (60)	4
**Huang Jiahao (CHN) (107)**	**5**
**Anthony McGill (SCO) (38)**	**5**
Jordan Brown (NIR) (64)	4
**Oliver Lines (ENG) (53)**	**5**
Reanne Evans (ENG) (82)	2
Ben Woollaston (ENG) (39)	4
**Luo Zetao (CHN) (122)**	**5**
**Jackson Page (WAL) (35)**	**5**
Dylan Emery (WAL) (72)	3
Chen Qi'en (CHN) (a)^{†}	2
**Andrew Higginson (ENG) (99)**	**5**
Noppon Saengkham (THA) (46)	4
**Lan Yuhao (CHN) (78)**	**5**
Martin O'Donnell (ENG) (52)	2
**David Grace (ENG) (74)**	**5**
Dong Zihao (CHN) (a)^{†}	1
**Marco Fu (HKG) (69)**	**5**
Daniel Wells (WAL) (45)	3
**Antoni Kowalski (POL) (109)**	**5**
Long Zehuang (CHN) (50)	2
**Liam Highfield (ENG) (68)**	**5**
**Chang Bingyu (CHN) (48)**	**5**
Chatchapong Nasa (THA) (91)	0
**He Guoqiang (CHN) (47)**	**5**
Lyu Haotian (CHN) (61)	3
**Ricky Walden (ENG) (54)**	**5**
Cheung Ka Wai (HKG) (110)	2
**Xu Si (CHN) (34)**	**5**
Mateusz Baranowski (POL) (85)	0
Wang Xinzhong (CHN) (a)^{†}	4
**Jamie Clarke (WAL) (101)**	**5**

**Round 3 (Last 64)**; Best of 9 frames
Mark Williams (WAL) (1)^{†}	4
**Fan Zhengyi (CHN) (57)**	**5**
**Yuan Sijun (CHN) (30)**	**5**
Iulian Boiko (UKR) (71)	3
Ronnie O'Sullivan (ENG) (14)^{†}	2
**Jiang Jun (CHN) (65)**	**5**
Jack Lisowski (ENG) (17)	1
**Zak Surety (ENG) (42)**	**5**
**Thepchaiya Un-Nooh (THA) (18)**	**5**
Deng Haohui (CHN) (124)	1
Xiao Guodong (CHN) (11)^{†}	4
**Michael Holt (ENG) (51)**	**5**
**David Gilbert (ENG) (31)**	**5**
Ashley Hugill (ENG) (108)	4
**Kyren Wilson (ENG) (8)^{†}**	**5**
Sam Craigie (ENG) (70)	1
Zhao Xintong (CHN) (5)^{†}	4
**Scott Donaldson (SCO) (55)**	**5**
**Pang Junxu (CHN) (25)**	**5**
Luca Brecel (BEL) (44)	2
Mark Allen (NIR) (12)^{†}	w/d
**Ben Mertens** (BEL) (62)	**w/o**
Zhou Yuelong (CHN) (23)	2
**Jimmy Robertson (ENG) (33)**	**5**
**Stuart Bingham (ENG) (21)**	**5**
Aaron Hill (IRL) (41)	2
**Chris Wakelin (ENG) (13)^{†}**	**5**
Liam Davies (WAL) (111)	3
**Lei Peifan (CHN) (26)**	**5**
Matthew Selt (ENG) (43)	4
**Neil Robertson (AUS) (4)^{†}**	**5**
Liu Hongyu (CHN) (58)	2
**Judd Trump (ENG) (3)^{†}**	**5**
Huang Jiahao (CHN) (107)	0
Jak Jones (WAL) (32)	2
**Anthony McGill (SCO) (38)**	**5**
**Si Jiahui (CHN) (16)^{†}**	**5**
Oliver Lines (ENG) (53)	1
**Gary Wilson (ENG) (24)**	**5**
Luo Zetao (CHN) (122)	2
Zhang Anda (CHN) (20)	2
**Jackson Page (WAL) (35)**	**5**
**Mark Selby (ENG) (9)^{†}**	**5**
Andrew Higginson (ENG) (99)	3
**Stephen Maguire (SCO) (29)**	**5**
Lan Yuhao (CHN) (78)	3
John Higgins (SCO) (6)^{†}	4
**David Grace (ENG) (74)**	**5**
**Shaun Murphy (ENG) (7)^{†}**	**5**
Marco Fu (HKG) (69)	1
**Hossein Vafaei (IRN) (28)**	**5**
Antoni Kowalski (POL) (109)	4
**Barry Hawkins (ENG) (10)^{†}**	**5**
Liam Highfield (ENG) (68)	3
**Elliot Slessor (ENG) (19)**	**5**
Chang Bingyu (CHN) (48)	4
**Ali Carter (ENG) (22)**	**5**
He Guoqiang (CHN) (47)	1
Ding Junhui (CHN) (15)^{†}	4
**Ricky Walden (ENG) (54)**	**5**
Joe O'Connor (ENG) (27)	1
**Xu Si (CHN) (34)**	**5**
**Wu Yize (CHN) (2)^{†}**	**5**
Jamie Clarke (WAL) (101)	4

Note: w/d=withdrawn; w/o=walkover
Note: ^{†} Match held-over to the main venue in Shenzhen

== Century breaks ==
=== Main stage centuries ===
A total of 56 century breaks were made during the main stage of the tournament in Shenzhen.

- 143, 132, 126, 123, 121, 117, 117, 110 – Wu Yize
- 139, 132, 112, 111, 104 – Shaun Murphy
- 139, 116 – Yuan Sijun
- 138, 135, 132 – Mark Selby
- 136, 105 – Xu Si
- 133, 130, 125, 120 – Chris Wakelin
- 133, 115 – Ricky Walden
- 133 – Marco Fu
- 131 – Lei Peifan
- 129, 107 – Liam Highfield
- 128, 108 – Jiang Jun
- 127, 119 – Si Jiahui
- 126 – Michael Holt
- 126 – Pang Junxu
- 122, 100 – Kyren Wilson
- 122 – Barry Hawkins
- 121, 117, 102, 100, 100 – Jimmy Robertson
- 120 – Neil Robertson
- 119 – Stephen Maguire
- 118 – Zak Surety
- 118 – Mark Williams
- 116, 101 – John Higgins
- 111 – Ding Junhui
- 108 – Judd Trump
- 105, 104 – Scott Donaldson
- 103 – Ali Carter
- 101 – Liam Davies

=== Qualifying stage centuries ===
A total of 56 century breaks were made during the qualifying stage of the tournament in Leicester.

- 147, 142, 135, 134, 131, 130, 109 – Chang Bingyu
- 140 – Liam Davies
- 137, 122, 108 – Noppon Saengkham
- 135, 108 – Wang Xinbo
- 134, 100 – Hossein Vafaei
- 132 – Luo Zetao
- 131, 118 – Jimmy Robertson
- 131 – Liam Highfield
- 130 – Zak Surety
- 129, 114, 114 – Luca Brecel
- 124, 117 – Marco Fu
- 124 – Ishpreet Singh Chadha
- 124 – Dylan Emery
- 121 – Antoni Kowalski
- 120 – Ben Mertens
- 119 – Fan Zhengyi
- 119 – Huang Jiahao
- 119 – Lan Yuhao
- 116, 115, 101, 100 – Ashley Hugill
- 115, 106 – Jordan Brown
- 115 – Yuan Sijun
- 114, 102 – Elliot Slessor
- 110 – Xu Si
- 109 – Reanne Evans
- 108 – Matthew Selt
- 106 – Cheung Ka Wai
- 105, 101 – Jiang Jun
- 105 – Steven Hallworth
- 104, 104 – Ali Carter
- 104 – David Grace
- 104 – Louis Heathcote
- 104 – Jak Jones
- 102 – Ricky Walden
- 101 – David Gilbert
- 100 – Matthew Stevens
