= 2026 Northern Ireland Open =

Snooker tournament

2026 BetVictor Northern Ireland Open
- Part of the Home Nations Series

Tournament information
- Dates: 18–25 October 2026
- Venue: Waterfront Hall
- City: Belfast
- Country: Northern Ireland
- Organisation: World Snooker Tour
- Format: Ranking event
- Total prize fund: £550,400
- Winner's share: £100,000
- Highest break: Kyren Wilson (ENG) (139)

Final
- Champion: Kyren Wilson (ENG)
- Runner-up: Jak Jones (WAL)
- Score: 9–2

The 2026 Northern Ireland Open (officially the 2026 BetVictor Northern Ireland Open) was a professional snooker tournament that took place from 18 to 25 October 2026 at the Waterfront Hall in Belfast, Northern Ireland. Qualifying took place from 13 to 16 September at the Leicester Arena in Leicester, England. The 11th consecutive edition of the tournament since it was first staged in 2016, it was the seventh ranking event of the 2026–27 snooker season, following the 2026 Shenzhen Open and preceding the 2026 International Championship. It was the second of four tournaments in the season's Home Nations Series, following the 2026 English Open and preceding the 2026 Scottish Open and the 2027 Welsh Open.

Jack Lisowski was the defending champion, having defeated Judd Trump 9–8 in the 2025 final, but he was beaten by Anthony McGill in the last 32.

Kyren Wilson won the tournament beating Jak Jones 9–2 in the final.

== Overview ==
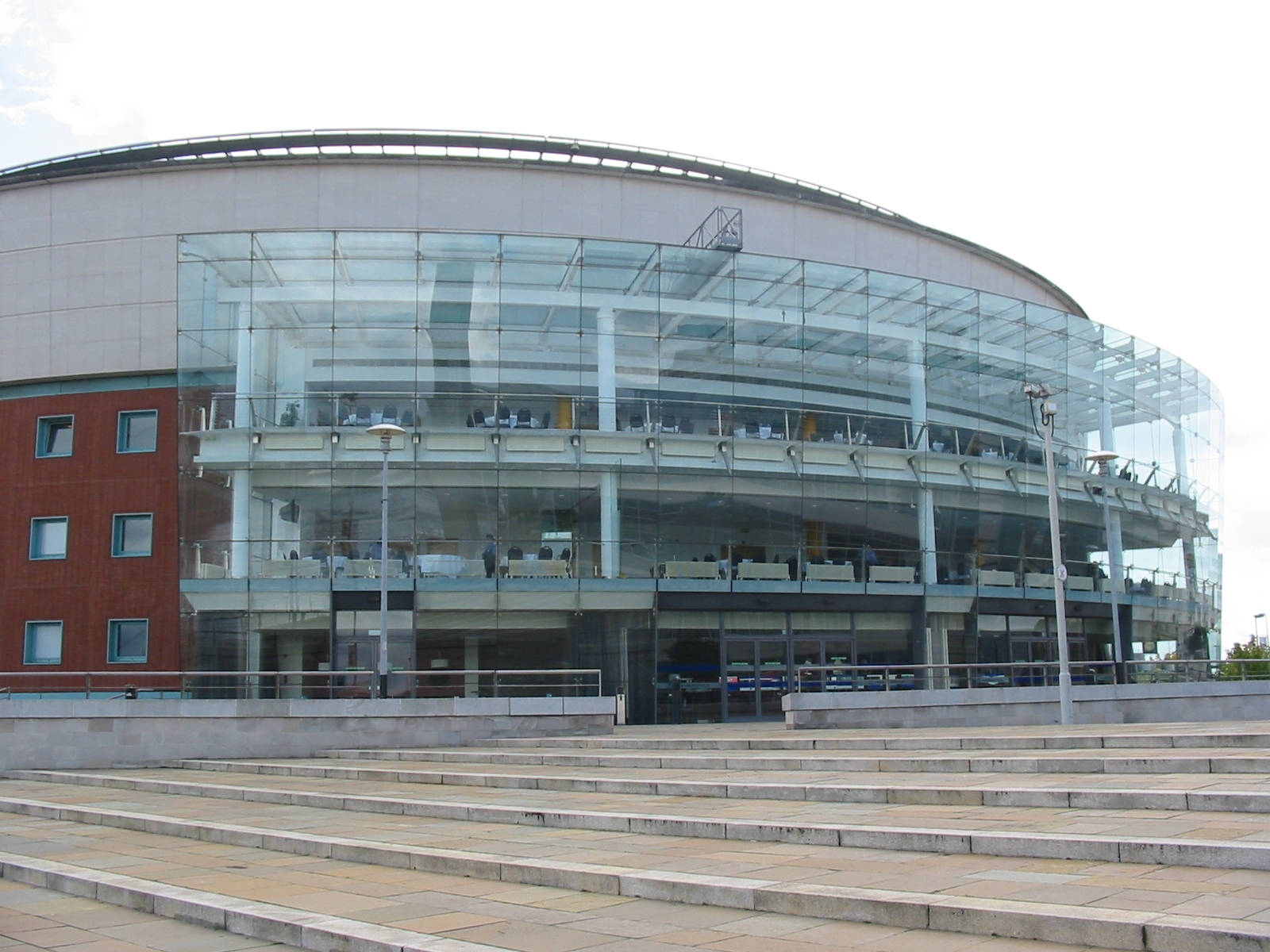
The tournament was held at the Waterfront Hall in Belfast, Northern Ireland.

The Northern Ireland Open was first staged in 2016 at the Titanic Exhibition Centre in Belfast, Northern Ireland. The inaugural winner was Mark King, who defeated Barry Hawkins 9–8 in the final to win his maiden ranking title. The tournament winner received the Alex Higgins Trophy, named in honour of the two-time World Champion, who died in 2010. At the inaugural edition of the tournament, the trophy was presented by Higgins's daughter Lauren.

The 2026 edition of the tournament—the 11th consecutive staging of the event—took place from 18 to 25 October at the Waterfront Hall in Belfast. Qualifying took place from 13 to 16 September at the Leicester Arena in Leicester, England. Sponsored by BetVictor, it was the seventh ranking event of the 2026–27 snooker season, following the 2026 Shenzhen Open and preceding the 2026 UK Championship. It was also the second of four tournaments in the season's Home Nations Series, following the 2026 English Open and preceding the 2026 Scottish Open and the 2027 Welsh Open. Jack Lisowski was the defending champion, having defeated Judd Trump 9–8 in the 2025 final, but Anthony McGill beat him 4–1 in the last 32.

Kyren Wilson won the tournament beating Jak Jones 9–2 in the final. There were 67 century breaks made during the event, with 18 made during qualifying, and 49 at the main stage. The highest break was a 139 made by Wilson.

=== Format ===
The tournament used a tiered format first implemented for the Home Nations Series in the 2024–25 snooker season. In round one, players seeded 65–96 faced those seeded 97 and below, including selected amateurs. In round two, the winners from round one faced players seeded 33–64. The winners from round two faced the top 32 seeds. All matches were played as the best of 7 frames until the quarter‑finals, which were the best of 11. The semi‑finals were the best of 11, and the final was a best‑of‑17-frame match played over two sessions.

=== Prize fund ===
The prize fund for the tournament is detailed below.

- Winner: £100,000
- Runner-up: £45,000
- Semi-final: £21,000
- Quarter-final: £13,200
- Last 16: £9,000
- Last 32: £5,400
- Last 64: £3,600
- Last 96: £1,000
- Highest break: £5,000
- Total: £550,400

== Summary ==
=== Qualifying ===
Liam Pullen whitewashed Paul Norris, Yao Pengcheng beat Bai Yulu 4–1, Oliver Sykes whitewashed Alexander Ursenbacher, and Cheung Ka Wai defeated Artemijs Žižins 4–3.

Aaron Hill defeated Ross Muir 4–3, Xu Si beat Jimmy White 4–2, Liam Davies beat Fan Zhengyi 4–1, Ben Mertens whitewashed Iulian Boiko, Mateusz Baranowski beat Yuan Sijun 4–1, and Wang Xinbo beat David Lilley, also by 4–1.

Sykes defeated Zak Surety 4–3, Jordan Brown whitewashed Julien Leclercq, Luca Brecel beat Mitchell Mann 4–1, Yao whitewashed Stan Moody, Liam Highfield beat Jiang Jun, 4–1, Pullen whitewashed Ben Woollaston, and Cheung defeated Oliver Lines 4–3.

=== Last 64 ===
Wu Yize and He Guoqiang withdrew and so Scott Donaldson and Elliot Slessor were given walkovers to the last 32, respectively.

Jordan Brown beat Mark Allen 4–2. It was Allen's first appearance in the 2026–27 season, and he subsequently said that he was considering retirement.

=== Last 32 ===
Anthony McGill beat the defending champion Jack Lisowski 4–1.

=== Quarter-finals ===
Mark Williams recovered from 2–4 behind to beat David Gilbert 6–4, making three century breaks of 104, 115 and 101 in the last four frames.

=== Semi-finals ===
Kyren Wilson recovered from 3–5 behind to defeat Sam Craigie 6–5.

Jak Jones recovered from 1–4 behind to defeat Williams 6–5.

=== Final ===
Wilson faced Jones in a repeat of the 2024 World Championship final when Wilson won 18–14. At the end of the afternoon session Wilson led Jones 6–2. Wilson went on to win the match, and the tournament 9–2.

== Main draw ==
The draw for the tournament is shown below. Numbers in the column to the left of the players' names denote the players' seeding, and players in bold denote match winners.

=== Top half ===
**Last 64**; Best of 7 frames
**1**	**Jack Lisowski (ENG)**	**4**
110	Huang Jiahao (CHN)	1
31	Stephen Maguire (SCO)	1
**38**	**Anthony McGill (SCO)**	**4**
16	Si Jiahui (CHN)	2
**104**	**Wang Xinbo (CHN)**	**4**
24	Gary Wilson (ENG)	3
**84**	**Mateusz Baranowski (POL)**	**4**
**20**	**Thepchaiya Un-Nooh (THA)**	**4**
37	Aaron Hill (IRL)	2
**9**	**Kyren Wilson (ENG)**	**4**
59	Ben Mertens (BEL)	0
**26**	**Pang Junxu (CHN)**	**4**
98	Alfie Burden (ENG)	2
8	Shaun Murphy (ENG)	2
**89**	**Liam Davies (WAL)**	**4**
5	Mark Selby (ENG)	2
**66**	**Louis Heathcote (ENG)**	**4**
27	Hossein Vafaei (IRN)	3
**46**	**Matthew Selt (ENG)**	**4**
12	Xiao Guodong (CHN)	3
**70**	**Sam Craigie (ENG)**	**4**
23	Ali Carter (ENG)	0
**36**	**Xu Si (CHN)**	**4**
**22**	**Elliot Slessor (ENG)**	**w/o**
43 (Note: He Guoqiang withdrew and so Elliot Slessor was given a walkover to the last 32.)	He Guoqiang (CHN)	w/d
13	Chris Wakelin (ENG)	1
**60**	**Jamie Jones (WAL)**	**4**
**29**	**Joe O'Connor (ENG)**	**4**
48	Matthew Stevens (WAL)	1
4	Neil Robertson (AUS)	1
**56**	**Ricky Walden (ENG)**	**4**

**Last 32**; Best of 7 frames
(England) Jack Lisowski	1
**(Scotland) Anthony McGill**	**4**
(China) Wang Xinbo	3
**(Poland) Mateusz Baranowski**	**4**
(Thailand) Thepchaiya Un-Nooh	2
**(England) Kyren Wilson**	**4**
**(China) Pang Junxu**	**4**
(Wales) Liam Davies	3
(England) Louis Heathcote	2
**(England) Matthew Selt**	**4**
**(England) Sam Craigie**	**4**
(China) Xu Si	3
**(England) Elliot Slessor**	**4**
(Wales) Jamie Jones	1
(England) Joe O'Connor	3
**(England) Ricky Walden**	**4**

**Last 16**; Best of 7 frames
**(Scotland) Anthony McGill**	**4**
(Poland) Mateusz Baranowski	1
**(England) Kyren Wilson**	**4**
(China) Pang Junxu	3
(England) Matthew Selt	2
**(England) Sam Craigie**	**4**
**(England) Elliot Slessor**	**4**
(England) Ricky Walden	1

**Quarter-finals**; Best of 11 frames
(Scotland) Anthony McGill	1
**(England) Kyren Wilson**	**6**
**(England) Sam Craigie**	**6**
(England) Elliot Slessor	2

**Semi-finals**; Best of 11 frames
**9**	**(England) Kyren Wilson**	**6**
70	(England) Sam Craigie	5

Note: w/d=withdrawn; w/o=walkover

=== Bottom half ===
**Last 64**; Best of 7 frames
3	Zhao Xintong (CHN)	2
**73**	**Gao Yang (CHN)**	**4**
**32**	**David Gilbert (ENG)**	**4**
100	Oliver Sykes (ENG)	1
15	Ronnie O'Sullivan (ENG)	3
**106**	**Cheung Ka Wai (HKG)**	**4**
**19**	**Stuart Bingham (ENG)**	**4**
74	Yao Pengcheng (CHN)	2
**18**	**Zhang Anda (CHN)**	**4**
65	Liam Pullen (ENG)	2
**10**	**Mark Williams (WAL)**	**4**
53	Robbie Williams (ENG)	2
25	Lei Peifan (CHN)	1
**39**	**Luca Brecel (BEL)**	**4**
6	Judd Trump (ENG)	3
**55**	**Martin O'Donnell (ENG)**	**4**
**7**	**John Higgins (SCO)**	**4**
68	Liam Highfield (ENG)	1
**30**	**Jak Jones (WAL)**	**4**
34	Tom Ford (ENG)	1
11	Barry Hawkins (ENG)	2
**50**	**Daniel Wells (WAL)**	**4**
21	Chang Bingyu (CHN)	3
**41**	**Ryan Day (WAL)**	**4**
17	Zhou Yuelong (CHN)	1
**47**	**Michael Holt (ENG)**	**4**
14	Mark Allen (NIR)	2
**63**	**Jordan Brown (NIR)**	**4**
**28**	**Noppon Saengkham (THA)**	**4**
108	Thanawat Tirapongpaiboon (THA)	3
2 (Note: Wu Yize withdrew and so Scott Donaldson was given a walkover to the last 32.)	Wu Yize (CHN)	w/d
**64**	**Scott Donaldson (SCO)**	**w/o**

**Last 32**; Best of 7 frames
(China) Gao Yang	3
**(England) David Gilbert**	**4**
**(Hong Kong) Cheung Ka Wai**	**4**
(England) Stuart Bingham	0
(China) Zhang Anda	2
**(Wales) Mark Williams**	**4**
(Belgium) Luca Brecel	2
**(England) Martin O'Donnell**	**4**
(Scotland) John Higgins	2
**(Wales) Jak Jones**	**4**
**(Wales) Daniel Wells**	**4**
(Wales) Ryan Day	3
(England) Michael Holt	3
**(Northern Ireland) Jordan Brown**	**4**
(Thailand) Noppon Saengkham	1
**(Scotland) Scott Donaldson**	**4**

**Last 16**; Best of 7 frames
**(England) David Gilbert**	**4**
(Hong Kong) Cheung Ka Wai	2
**(Wales) Mark Williams**	**4**
(England) Martin O'Donnell	0
**(Wales) Jak Jones**	**4**
(Wales) Daniel Wells	2
(Northern Ireland) Jordan Brown	2
**(Scotland) Scott Donaldson**	**4**

**Quarter-finals**; Best of 11 frames
(England) David Gilbert	4
**(Wales) Mark Williams**	**6**
**(Wales) Jak Jones**	**6**
(Scotland) Scott Donaldson	5

**Semi-finals**; Best of 11 frames
10	(Wales) Mark Williams	5
**30**	**(Wales) Jak Jones**	**6**

Note: w/d=withdrawn; w/o=walkover

=== Final: frame scores ===
Final: Best of 17 frames. Referee: Rob Spencer; Waterfront Hall, Belfast, Northern Ireland, 25 October 2026
**Kyren Wilson** (9); England	**9**–2	Jak Jones (30); Wales
Afternoon: **109**–7 (101), 0–**73**, **71**–1, **81**–9, **135**–0 (135), 0–**130** (130), **114**–1, **105**–1 (105); Evening: **63**–7, **87**–8, **75**–6
(frame 5) **135**	Highest break	130 (frame 6)
**3**	Century breaks	1

== Qualifying rounds ==
The results of the qualifying matches are shown below. Numbers in parentheses after the players' names denote the players' seeding, an "a" indicates amateur players who were not on the main World Snooker Tour, and players in bold denote match winners.

**Round 1 (Last 128)**; Best of 7 frames
Reanne Evans (ENG) (82)	1
**Huang Jiahao (CHN) (110)**	**4**
Connor Benzey (ENG) (91)	1
**Liu Yang (CHN) (118)**	**4**
Liam Graham (SCO) (86)	1
**Wang Xinbo (CHN) (104)**	**4**
**Mateusz Baranowski** (POL) (84)	**w/o**
Gong Chenzhi (CHN) (111) (Note: Gong Chenzhi did not show up for his match with Mateusz Baranowski and so Baranowski was given a walkover.)	n/s
**Ross Muir (SCO) (81)**	**4**
Andrew Higginson (ENG) (105)	1
**Iulian Boiko (UKR) (71)**	**4**
Luo Zetao (CHN) (112)	3
Fergal Quinn (NIR) (94)	1
**Alfie Burden (ENG) (98)**	**4**
**Liam Davies (WAL) (89)**	**4**
Hammad Miah (ENG) (102)	3
**Louis Heathcote (ENG) (66)**	**4**
Craig Steadman (ENG) (116)	2
Oliver Brown (ENG) (87)	1
**Antoni Kowalski (POL) (113)**	**4**
**Sam Craigie (ENG) (70)**	**4**
Anton Kazakov (UKR) (115)	1
**Jimmy White (ENG) (96)**	**4**
Sean O'Sullivan (ENG) (114)	1
**Zhao Hanyang (CHN) (80)**	**4**
Mahmoud El Hareedy (EGY) (107)	2
**Xu Yichen (CHN) (79)**	**4**
Mina Awad (EGY) (126)	2
**Marco Fu (HKG) (69)**	**4**
Joel Connolly (NIR) (a)	0
**Ian Burns (ENG) (75)**	**4**
Stuart Carrington (ENG) (120)	0

**Round 2 (Last 96)**; Best of 7 frames
Liu Hongyu (CHN) (54)	2
**Huang Jiahao (CHN) (110)**	**4**
**Anthony McGill (SCO) (38)**	**4**
Liu Yang (CHN) (118)	1
David Lilley (ENG) (58)	1
**Wang Xinbo (CHN) (104)**	**4**
Yuan Sijun (CHN) (33)	1
**Mateusz Baranowski (POL) (84)**	**4**
**Aaron Hill (IRL) (37)**	**4**
Ross Muir (SCO) (81)	3
**Ben Mertens (BEL) (59)**	**4**
Iulian Boiko (UKR) (71)	0
Jimmy Robertson (ENG) (45)	1
**Alfie Burden (ENG) (98)**	**4**
Fan Zhengyi (CHN) (52)	1
**Liam Davies (WAL) (89)**	**4**
Lyu Haotian (CHN) (61)	2
**Louis Heathcote (ENG) (66)**	**4**
**Matthew Selt (ENG) (46)**	**4**
Antoni Kowalski (POL) (113)	0
Ishpreet Singh Chadha (IND) (57)	1
**Sam Craigie (ENG) (70)**	**4**
**Xu Si (CHN) (36)**	**4**
Jimmy White (ENG) (96)	2
**He Guoqiang (CHN) (43)**	**4**
Zhao Hanyang (CHN) (80)	3
**Jamie Jones (WAL) (60)**	**4**
Xu Yichen (CHN) (79)	2
**Matthew Stevens (WAL) (48)**	**4**
Marco Fu (HKG) (69)	1
**Ricky Walden (ENG) (56)**	**4**
Ian Burns (ENG) (75)	3

**Round 1 (Last 128)**; Best of 7 frames
**Gao Yang (CHN) (73)**	**4**
Panchaya Channoi (THA) (124)	0
Alexander Ursenbacher (SUI) (90)	0
**Oliver Sykes (ENG) (100)**	**4**
Artemijs Žižins (LVA) (95)	3
**Cheung Ka Wai (HKG) (106)**	**4**
**Yao Pengcheng (CHN) (74)**	**4**
Bai Yulu (CHN) (125)	1
**Liam Pullen (ENG) (65)**	**4**
Paul Norris (ENG) (123)	0
Sahil Nayyar (CAN) (92)	1
**Michael Larkov (UKR) (121)**	**4**
Liu Wenwei (CHN) (83)	3
**Mitchell Mann (ENG) (97)**	**4**
**Chatchapong Nasa (THA) (93)**	**4**
Darragh Gallagher (NIR) (a)	1
**Liam Highfield (ENG) (68)**	**4**
Phil O'Kane (ENG) (119)	1
**David Grace (ENG) (76)**	**4**
Deng Haohui (CHN) (117)	2
**Dylan Emery (WAL) (67)**	**4**
Jamie Clarke (WAL) (101)	0
Lan Yuhao (CHN) (78)	2
**Ashley Hugill (ENG) (122)**	**4**
Florian Nüßle (AUT) (88)	3
**Ng On-yee (HKG) (103)**	**4**
Michał Szubarczyk (POL) (77)	1
**Julien Leclercq (BEL) (109)**	**4**
Steven Hallworth (ENG) (72)	1
**T. Tirapongpaiboon (THA) (108)**	**4**
**Leone Crowley (IRL) (85)**	**4**
Ashley Carty (ENG) (99)	1

**Round 2 (Last 96)**; Best of 7 frames
Long Zehuang (CHN) (49)	2
**Gao Yang (CHN) (73)**	**4**
Zak Surety (ENG) (42)	3
**Oliver Sykes (ENG) (100)**	**4**
Oliver Lines (ENG) (51)	3
**Cheung Ka Wai (HKG) (106)**	**4**
Stan Moody (ENG) (40)	0
**Yao Pengcheng (CHN) (74)**	**4**
Ben Woollaston (ENG) (44)	0
**Liam Pullen (ENG) (65)**	**4**
**Robbie Williams (ENG) (53)**	**4**
Michael Larkov (UKR) (121)	1
**Luca Brecel (BEL) (39)**	**4**
Mitchell Mann (ENG) (97)	1
**Martin O'Donnell (ENG) (55)**	**4**
Chatchapong Nasa (THA) (93)	1
Jiang Jun (CHN) (62)	1
**Liam Highfield (ENG) (68)**	**4**
**Tom Ford (ENG) (34)**	**4**
David Grace (ENG) (76)	0
**Daniel Wells (WAL) (50)**	**4**
Dylan Emery (WAL) (67)	0
**Ryan Day (WAL) (41)**	**4**
Ashley Hugill (ENG) (122)	2
**Michael Holt (ENG) (47)**	**4**
Ng On-yee (HKG) (103)	0
**Jordan Brown (NIR) (63)**	**4**
Julien Leclercq (BEL) (109)	0
Jackson Page (WAL) (35)	2
**T. Tirapongpaiboon (THA) (108)**	**4**
**Scott Donaldson (SCO) (64)**	**4**
Leone Crowley (IRL) (85)	3

Note: n/s=no show; w/o=walkover

== Century breaks ==
=== Main stage centuries ===
A total of 49 century breaks were made during the main stage of the tournament in Belfast. (Note: The WST match sheet for the Stuart Bingham v Yao Pengcheng match gives Yao a 118 break in the third frame. This is not correct. The break was 52. Actual frame scores: 99(68)‍–‍1; 56‍–‍19; 9‍–‍119(52); 0‍–‍94(94); 72‍–‍28; 76‍–‍62. The WST centuries total is also therefore incorrect as it incudes a 118 break for Yao giving 50 total.)

- 139, 135, 122, 105, 103, 101 – Kyren Wilson
- 138 – Ronnie O'Sullivan
- 133, 130, 121, 103 – Jak Jones
- 131, 112 – Gao Yang
- 129, 110, 108, 103, 100, 100 – Sam Craigie
- 129 – Zhao Xintong
- 127, 115, 104, 101 – Mark Williams
- 126, 120 – Noppon Saengkham
- 124, 106 – Joe O'Connor
- 121 – John Higgins
- 113, 101 – Jordan Brown
- 112, 108 – Pang Junxu
- 112 – Wang Xinbo
- 111, 106, 104 – David Gilbert
- 111 – Cheung Ka Wai
- 110 – Zhang Anda
- 108, 100 – Mateusz Baranowski
- 108 – Ryan Day
- 107 – Gary Wilson
- 106 – Daniel Wells
- 104, 103 – Liam Davies
- 104 – Louis Heathcote
- 104 – Si Jiahui
- 101 – Thepchaiya Un-Nooh

=== Qualifying stage centuries ===
A total of 18 century breaks were made during the qualifying stage of the tournament in Leicester.

- 138 – Julien Leclercq
- 134, 122 – Thanawat Tirapongpaiboon
- 123 – Cheung Ka Wai
- 121 – Ricky Walden
- 120 – Liam Pullen
- 117, 102 – Yao Pengcheng
- 111 – Liam Highfield
- 110 – Marco Fu
- 103, 100 – Xu Yichen
- 103 – Liam Davies
- 103 – Tom Ford
- 102 – Ryan Day
- 102 – Dylan Emery
- 102 – Wang Xinbo
- 100 – Jackson Page
