= 2026 English Open (snooker) =

Snooker tournament

2026 BetVictor English Open
- Part of the Home Nations Series

Tournament information
- Dates: 7–13 September 2026
- Venue: Brentwood Centre
- City: Brentwood
- Country: England
- Organisation: World Snooker Tour
- Format: Ranking event
- Total prize fund: £550,400
- Winner's share: £100,000
- Highest break: Zhou Yuelong (CHN) (141)

Final
- Champion: Ali Carter (ENG)
- Runner-up: Mark Williams (WAL)
- Score: 9–6

The 2026 English Open (officially the 2026 BetVictor English Open) was a professional snooker tournament that took place from 7 to 13 September 2026 at the Brentwood Centre in Brentwood, England. Qualifying took place on 25 and 26 July at the Leicester Arena in Leicester, England. The 11th consecutive edition of the tournament since it was first staged in 2016, it was the fifth ranking event of the 2026–27 snooker season, following the 2026 British Open and preceding the 2026 Shenzhen Open. It was the first of four tournaments in the season's Home Nations Series, preceding the 2026 Northern Ireland Open, the 2026 Scottish Open, and the 2027 Welsh Open.

Mark Allen won the 2025 edition, defeating Zhou Yuelong 9–8 in the final. However, he withdrew from the 2026 edition for personal reasons.

Ali Carter won the tournament, beating Mark Williams 9–6 in the final.

== Overview ==
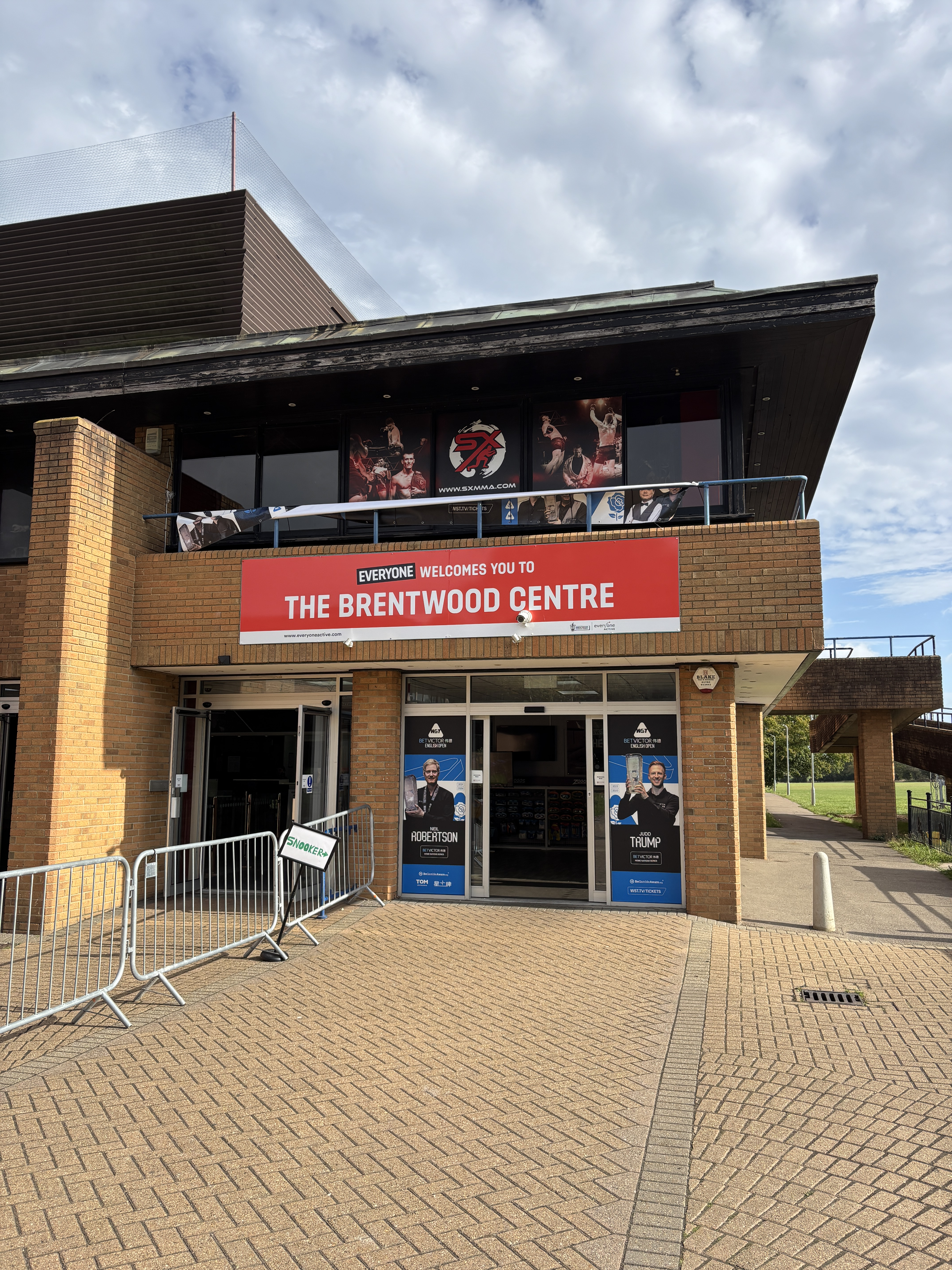
The tournament was held at the Brentwood Centre (pictured in 2025) in Brentwood, England, for a fifth consecutive year.

The English Open was first staged in 2016 and the inaugural winner was Liang Wenbo, who defeated Judd Trump 9–6 in the final to win his maiden ranking title. The winner received the Steve Davis Trophy, which was named to honour the six-time World Champion following his retirement at the end of the 2015–16 snooker season.

The 2026 edition—the 11th consecutive staging of the event—took place from 7 to 13 September at the Brentwood Centre in Brentwood, England, the fifth consecutive year the venue hosted the tournament. Qualifying took place on 25 and 26 June at the Leicester Arena in Leicester, England. Sponsored by BetVictor, it was the fifth ranking event of the 2026–27 snooker season, following the 2026 British Open and preceding the 2026 Shenzhen Open. It was also the first of four tournaments in the season's Home Nations Series, preceding the 2026 Northern Ireland Open, the 2026 Scottish Open, and the 2027 Welsh Open.

Mark Allen won the 2025 edition, defeating Zhou Yuelong 9–8 in the 2025 final, but he withdrew from the 2026 edition for personal reasons and so Sam Craigie received a bye to the last 32.

Ali Carter won the tournament, beating Mark Williams 9–6 in the final. There were 72 century breaks made in the event, with 40 at the main stage, and 32 during qualifying. The highest break was a 141 made by Zhou Yuelong.

=== Format ===
The tournament used a tiered format first implemented for the Home Nations Series in the 2024–25 snooker season. In round one, players seeded 65–96 faced those seeded 97 and below, including selected amateurs. In round two, the winners from round one faced players seeded 33–64. The winners from round two faced the top 32 seeds. All matches were played as the best of 7 frames until the quarter‑finals, which were the best of 11. The semi‑finals were the best of 11, and the final was a best‑of‑17-frame match played over two sessions.

=== Prize fund ===
The prize fund for the tournament is detailed below.

- Winner: £100,000
- Runner-up: £45,000
- Semi-final: £21,000
- Quarter-final: £13,200
- Last 16: £9,000
- Last 32: £5,400
- Last 64: £3,600
- Last 96: £1,000
- Highest break: £5,000
- Total: £550,400

== Summary ==
=== Last 64 ===
Mark Allen, Ronnie O'Sullivan, and Jak Jones withdrew giving Sam Craigie, Liam Davies, and Chang Bingyu walkovers to the last 32 respectively.

Oliver Lines beat world number one Zhao Xintong 4–2, Luo Zetao defeated Neil Robertson 4–3, Gong Chenzhi beat Jimmy Robertson, also by 4–3, and Kyren Wilson beat Mateusz Baranowski 4–1. Judd Trump whitewashed Jordan Brown, Mark Williams defeated Thanawat Tirapongpaiboon 4–3, Mark Selby beat Ricky Walden, also by 4–3, Barry Hawkins beat Lyu Haotian 4–2, and Jamie Clarke defeated David Gilbert 4–3.

=== Last 32 ===
Selby defeated Zhang Anda 4–3, Wilson beat Chang, also by 4–3, Trump beat Ashley Carty 4–1, Wu Yize beat Xu Si 4–2, Davies beat Wang Xinbo 4–1, and Anthony McGill, beat Fan Zhengyi, also by 4–1. Shaun Murphy whitewashed Jamie Clarke, Yuan Sijun defeated Lines 4–3, Hawkins beat Daniel Wells 4–1, Mark Williams defeated Matthew Selt 4–3, and Ali Carter whitewashed Robbie Williams.

=== Last 16 ===
Davies beat World champion Wu 4–1, Wilson defeated Selby 4–3, Zhou Yuelong beat Yuan 4–2, and Ding Junhui beat Joe O'Connor 4–1. Trump defeated McGill 4–3, Carter beat Gong 4–2, Williams beat Hawkins 4–1, and Murphy defeated Pang Junxu 4–3.

=== Quarter-finals ===
The quarter-finals were played on 11 September as the best of 11 frames.

In the afternoon session Ding beat Wilson 6–2, and Carter defeated Zhou 6–5.

In the evening session Murphy defeated Trump 6–5, and Williams beat Davies 6–3, with Williams making his 700th career century in the final frame.

=== Semi-finals ===
The semi-finals were played on 12 September as the best of 11 frames.

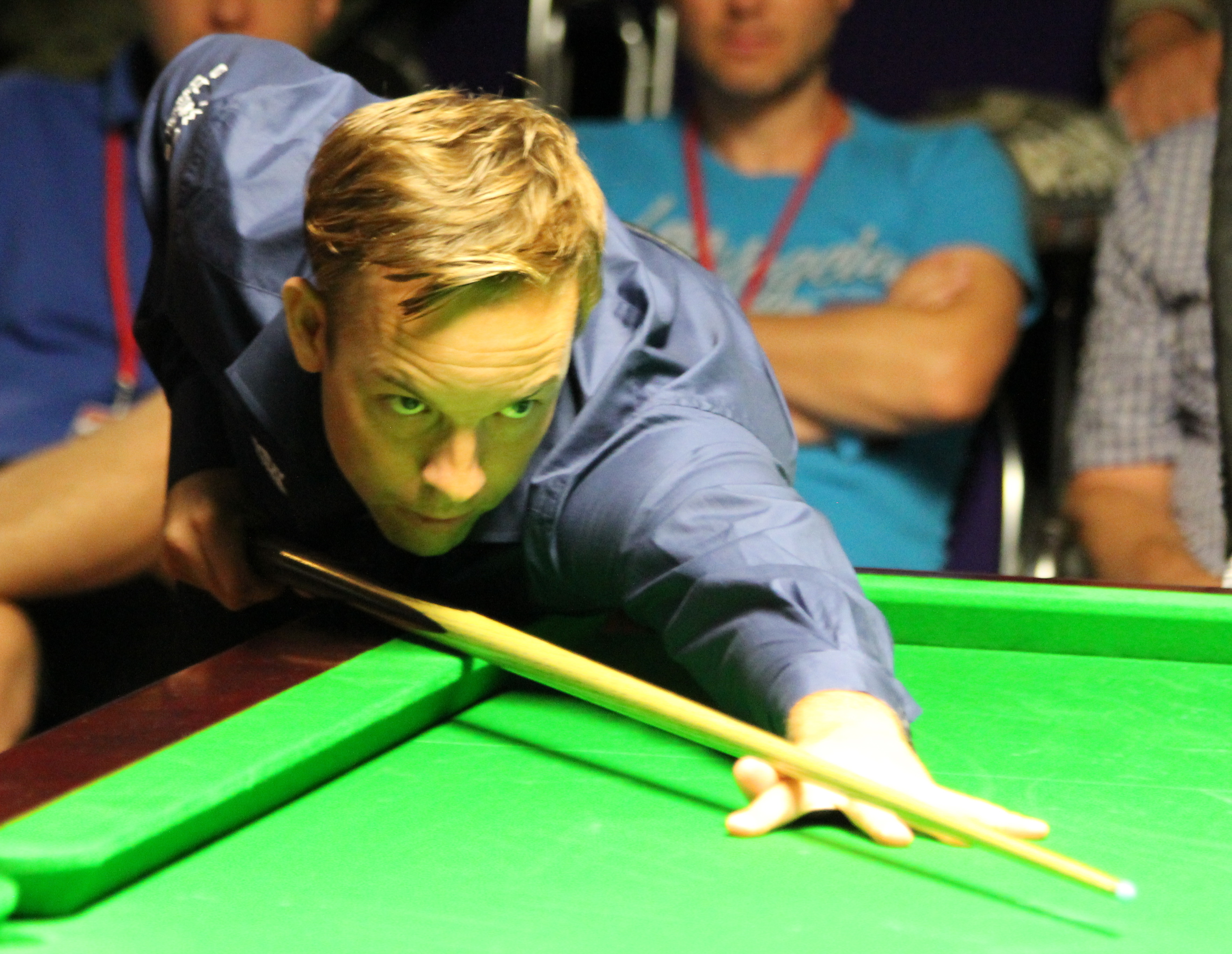
Ali Carter (pictured in 2015) beat Ding Junhui 6–2.

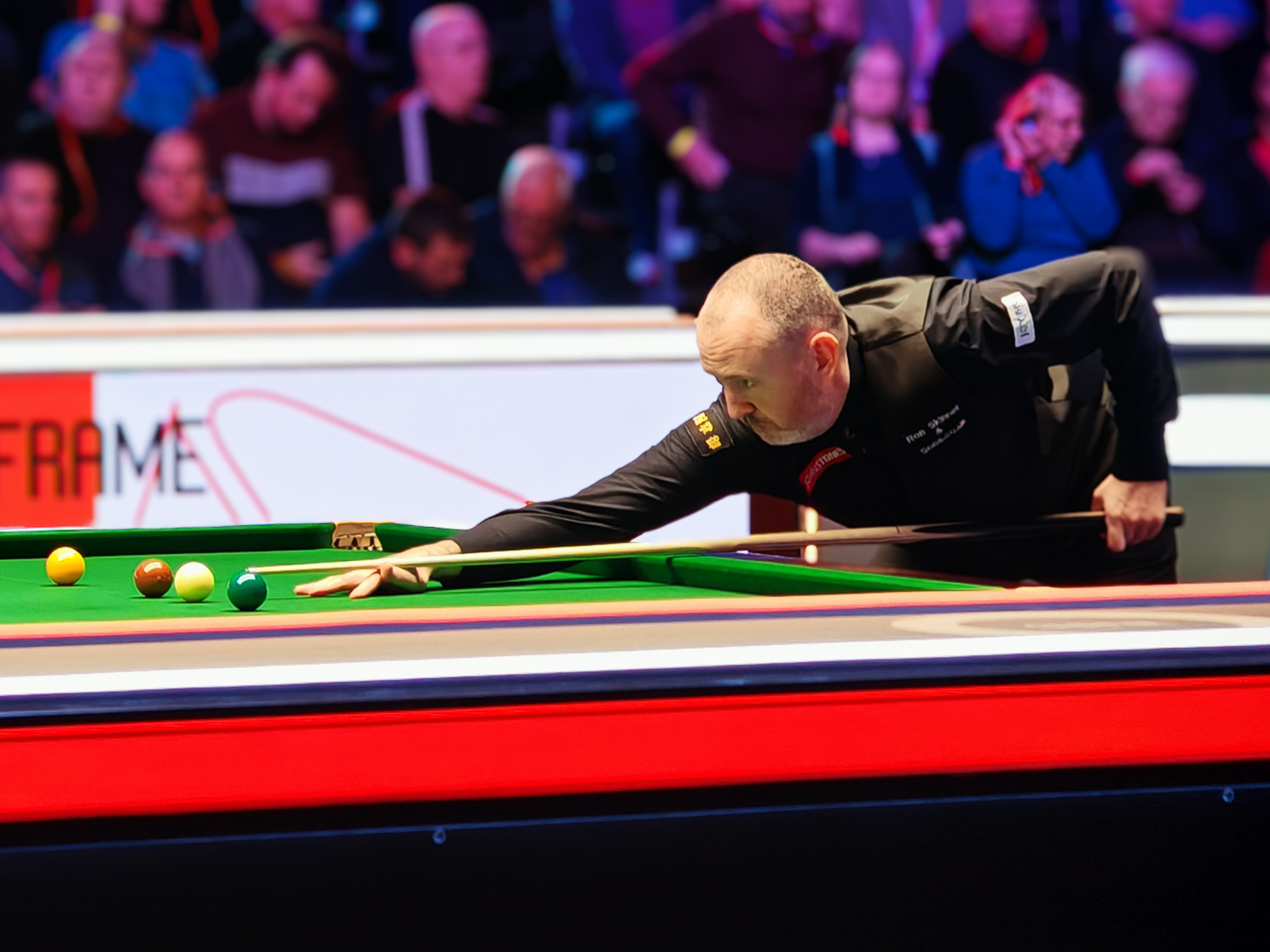
Mark Williams (pictured in 2025) beat Shaun Murphy 6–5.

In the afternoon session Carter beat Ding 6–2. After the match Carter said: "I felt I was just hanging on in the first four frames, but to get out 2–2 was great as I was always on the back foot. I went out after the interval and played no miss snooker so it was amazing. To get in the top 16 at my ripe old age of 47 wouldn't be too bad would it? There is a lot to play for tomorrow, but I'm going to be in there fighting. Arguably Shaun [Murphy] is one of the best players in the world and Mark Williams is an all-time great. It is going to be really tough but I'm going to savour it. It is brilliant to be here. It goes without saying that it is all about the winning, but it has been a good week to get to another final. I'm still competing with the best players in the world and it is a feather in my cap."

In the evening session Williams defeated Murphy 6–5. After the match Williams said: "I'm not sure how I managed to win. I looked at the scoreboard, saw 5–1 and thought I was out. I stuck in there and made a few good clearances. I got it back to 5–4 and he [Murphy] started to miss a few. It was a great clearance to go 5–5 and an unbelievable break in the decider. He missed an easy black at 5–2 and I just thought at least if I could clear up I wasn't giving it to him. Those matches coming from 5–1 down probably only happen once in a thousand. I just had to stick in and that was the one time it turned round for me. It has to be up there with my best comebacks. I was 5–1 down and 60 odd behind on two occasions. I'm over the moon to have a crack at the final now."

=== Final ===
Ali Carter with the Steve Davis trophy

The final was played on 13 September as the best of 17 frames, played over two sessions.

At the end of the afternoon session, Williams led Carter 5–3. However, Carter went on to win the match, and the tournament, 9–6. After the match Carter said: "It doesn't feel real at the moment. It hasn't really sunk in, I've not won as many titles as someone like Mark Williams, but it is great. The boys know I can play, that is for sure. In all my ranking events I've never beat one of the all‑time greats in the final, to do that today makes it extra special. Not being detrimental to the other players I've beat it has been lower ranked players than me. To play Mark Williams and win in front of my home crowd is a dream come true. I was flying my aeroplane last night. I was getting in it, running the check list, starting it up and going out flying for half an hour. I was getting away from it all. That was nectar for me." Williams said: "I tried my best. I played alright in patches. I didn't play too well tonight, but Ali [Carter] put pressure on me and I didn't handle it very well. He deserved to win. It was a great game and I enjoyed it. I tried my best. The crowd has been unbelievable all week. The conditions have been good, tough at times, but good. Well done and good luck to Ali."

== Final rounds ==
The draw for the final rounds is shown below. Numbers in the column to the left of the players' names denote the players' seeding, and players in bold denote match winners.

=== Top half ===
**Last 64**; Best of 7 frames
1 (Note: Mark Allen withdrew and so Sam Craigie was given a walkover to the last 32.)	Mark Allen (NIR)	w/d
**68**	**Sam Craigie (ENG)**	**w/o**
**26**	**Joe O'Connor (ENG)**	**4**
91	Florian Nüßle (AUT)	0
**14**	**Ding Junhui (CHN)**	**4**
49	Michael Holt (ENG)	3
18	Elliot Slessor (ENG)	3
**106**	**Ashley Hugill (ENG)**	**4**
**19**	**Zhang Anda (CHN)**	**4**
40	Zak Surety (ENG)	1
**9**	**Mark Selby (ENG)**	**4**
52	Ricky Walden (ENG)	3
30 (Note: Jak Jones withdrew and so Chang Bingyu was given a walkover to the last 32.)	Jak Jones (WAL)	w/d
**46**	**Chang Bingyu (CHN)**	**w/o**
**8**	**Kyren Wilson (ENG)**	**4**
83	Mateusz Baranowski (POL)	1
5	Zhao Xintong (CHN)	2
**51**	**Oliver Lines (ENG)**	**4**
**28**	**Yuan Sijun (CHN)**	**4**
34	Tom Ford (ENG)	2
**12**	**Chris Wakelin (ENG)**	**4**
65	Louis Heathcote (ENG)	3
**22**	**Zhou Yuelong (CHN)**	**4**
38	Stan Moody (ENG)	3
**21**	**Ali Carter (ENG)**	**4**
33	Jackson Page (WAL)	1
15	Si Jiahui (CHN)	1
**54**	**Robbie Williams (ENG)**	**4**
31	Jimmy Robertson (ENG)	3
**111**	**Gong Chenzhi (CHN)**	**4**
4	Neil Robertson (AUS)	3
**120**	**Luo Zetao (CHN)**	**4**

**Last 32**; Best of 7 frames
(England) Sam Craigie	2
**(England) Joe O'Connor**	**4**
**(China) Ding Junhui**	**4**
(England) Ashley Hugill	2
(China) Zhang Anda	3
**(England) Mark Selby**	**4**
(China) Chang Bingyu	3
**(England) Kyren Wilson**	**4**
(England) Oliver Lines	3
**(China) Yuan Sijun**	**4**
(England) Chris Wakelin	3
**(China) Zhou Yuelong**	**4**
**(England) Ali Carter**	**4**
(England) Robbie Williams	0
**(China) Gong Chenzhi**	**4**
(China) Luo Zetao	1

**Last 16**; Best of 7 frames
(England) Joe O'Connor	1
**(China) Ding Junhui**	**4**
(England) Mark Selby	3
**(England) Kyren Wilson**	**4**
(China) Yuan Sijun	2
**(China) Zhou Yuelong**	**4**
**(England) Ali Carter**	**4**
(China) Gong Chenzhi	2

**Quarter-finals**; Best of 11 frames
**(China) Ding Junhui**	**6**
(England) Kyren Wilson	2
(China) Zhou Yuelong	5
**(England) Ali Carter**	**6**

**Semi-finals**; Best of 11 frames
14	(China) Ding Junhui	2
**21**	**(England) Ali Carter**	**6**

=== Bottom half ===
**Last 64**; Best of 7 frames
**3**	**Judd Trump (ENG)**	**4**
62	Jordan Brown (NIR)	0
25	Lei Peifan (CHN)	3
**104**	**Ashley Carty (ENG)**	**4**
16	Jack Lisowski (ENG)	2
**55**	**Fan Zhengyi (CHN)**	**4**
20	Stuart Bingham (ENG)	3
**36**	**Anthony McGill (SCO)**	**4**
**24**	**Pang Junxu (CHN)**	**4**
107	Antoni Kowalski (POL)	3
11	Xiao Guodong (CHN)	3
**82**	**Ross Muir (SCO)**	**4**
29	David Gilbert (ENG)	3
**99**	**Jamie Clarke (WAL)**	**4**
**6**	**Shaun Murphy (ENG)**	**4**
116	Artemijs Žižins (LVA)	2
**7**	**Mark Williams (WAL)**	**4**
117	Thanawat Tirapongpaiboon (THA)	3
27	Hossein Vafaei (IRN)	1
**41**	**Matthew Selt (ENG)**	**4**
**10**	**Barry Hawkins (ENG)**	**4**
59	Lyu Haotian (CHN)	2
23	Gary Wilson (ENG)	2
**43**	**Daniel Wells (WAL)**	**4**
17	Thepchaiya Un-Nooh (THA)	2
**115**	**Wang Xinbo (CHN)**	**4**
13 (Note: Ronnie O'Sullivan withdrew and so Liam Davies was given a walkover to the last 32.)	Ronnie O'Sullivan (ENG)	w/d
**109**	**Liam Davies (WAL)**	**w/o**
**32**	**Xu Si (CHN)**	**4**
39	Aaron Hill (IRL)	3
**2**	**Wu Yize (CHN)**	**4**
73	Gao Yang (CHN)	1

**Last 32**; Best of 7 frames
**(England) Judd Trump**	**4**
(England) Ashley Carty	1
(China) Fan Zhengyi	1
**(Scotland) Anthony McGill**	**4**
**(China) Pang Junxu**	**4**
(Scotland) Ross Muir	3
(Wales) Jamie Clarke	0
**(England) Shaun Murphy**	**4**
**(Wales) Mark Williams**	**4**
(England) Matthew Selt	3
**(England) Barry Hawkins**	**4**
(Wales) Daniel Wells	1
(China) Wang Xinbo	1
**(Wales) Liam Davies**	**4**
(China) Xu Si	2
**(China) Wu Yize**	**4**

**Last 16**; Best of 7 frames
**(England) Judd Trump**	**4**
(Scotland) Anthony McGill	3
(China) Pang Junxu	3
**(England) Shaun Murphy**	**4**
**(Wales) Mark Williams**	**4**
(England) Barry Hawkins	1
**(Wales) Liam Davies**	**4**
(China) Wu Yize	1

**Quarter-finals**; Best of 11 frames
(England) Judd Trump	5
**(England) Shaun Murphy**	**6**
**(Wales) Mark Williams**	**6**
(Wales) Liam Davies	3

**Semi-finals**; Best of 11 frames
6	(England) Shaun Murphy	5
**7**	**(Wales) Mark Williams**	**6**

Note: w/d=withdrawn; w/o=walkover

=== Final: frame scores ===
Final: Best of 17 frames. Referee: Ben Williams; Brentwood Centre, Brentwood, England, 13 September 2026
**Ali Carter** (21); England	**9**–6	Mark Williams (7); Wales
Afternoon: 0–**136** (136), **83**–47, 32–**70**, 1–**132** (132), **110**–22 (103), **67**–4, 48–**82**, 51–**75**; Evening: **92**–12, **68**–30, **79**–24, 10–**61**, **59**–6, **84**–50, **99**–0
(frame 5) 103	Highest break	**136** (frame 1)
1	Century breaks	**2**

== Qualifying draw ==
All qualifying matches were the best of 7 frames. Numbers in parentheses after the players' names denote the players' seeding, an (a) indicates amateur players not on the World Snooker Tour, and players in bold denote match winners.

**Round 1 (Last 128)**; Best of 7 frames
**Sam Craigie (ENG) (68)**	**4**
Sean O'Sullivan (ENG) (102)	3
**Florian Nüßle (AUT) (91)**	**4**
Liu Yang (CHN) (124)	2
**Dylan Emery (WAL) (70)**	**4**
Paul Norris (ENG) (119)	0
Chatchapong Nasa (THA) (89)	3
**Ashley Hugill (ENG) (106)**	**4**
**Leone Crowley (IRL) (84)**	**4**
Andrew Higginson (ENG) (97)	3
**Marco Fu (HKG) (67)**	**4**
Hammad Miah (ENG) (103)	0
Jimmy White (ENG) (92)	0
**Cheung Ka Wai (HKG) (108)**	**4**
**Mateusz Baranowski (POL) (83)**	**4**
Bai Yulu (CHN) (110)	0
**Connor Benzey (ENG) (86)**	**4**
Mitchell Mann (ENG) (98)	2
**Xu Yichen (CHN) (78)**	**4**
Vladislav Gradinari (MDA) (a)	1
**Louis Heathcote (ENG) (65)**	**4**
Huang Jiahao (CHN) (105)	1
**David Grace (ENG) (72)**	**4**
Deng Haohui (CHN) (122)	1
Fergal Quinn (NIR) (88)	3
**Phil O'Kane (ENG) (118)**	**4**
**Liam Highfield (ENG) (66)**	**4**
Michael Larkov (UKR) (123)	3
Iulian Boiko (UKR) (69)	0
**Gong Chenzhi (CHN) (111)**	**4**
Mahmoud El Hareedy (EGY) (95)	2
**Luo Zetao (CHN) (120)**	**4**

**Round 2 (Last 96)**; Best of 7 frames
David Lilley (ENG) (58)	0
**Sam Craigie (ENG) (68)**	**4**
Noppon Saengkham (THA) (44)	0
**Florian Nüßle (AUT) (91)**	**4**
**Michael Holt (ENG) (49)**	**4**
Dylan Emery (WAL) (70)	2
Matthew Stevens (WAL) (47)	0
**Ashley Hugill (ENG) (106)**	**4**
**Zak Surety (ENG) (40)**	**4**
Leone Crowley (IRL) (84)	0
**Ricky Walden (ENG) (52)**	**4**
Marco Fu (HKG) (67)	3
**Chang Bingyu (CHN) (46)**	**4**
Cheung Ka Wai (HKG) (108)	3
Jamie Jones (WAL) (61)	2
**Mateusz Baranowski (POL) (83)**	**4**
**Oliver Lines (ENG) (51)**	**4**
Connor Benzey (ENG) (86)	1
**Tom Ford (ENG) (34)**	**4**
Xu Yichen (CHN) (78)	2
Ishpreet Singh Chadha (IND) (57)	3
**Louis Heathcote (ENG) (65)**	**4**
**Stan Moody (ENG) (38)**	**4**
David Grace (ENG) (72)	3
**Jackson Page (WAL) (33)**	**4**
Phil O'Kane (ENG) (118)	1
**Robbie Williams (ENG) (54)**	**4**
Liam Highfield (ENG) (66)	3
He Guoqiang (CHN) (45)	2
**Gong Chenzhi (CHN) (111)**	**4**
Scott Donaldson (SCO) (53)	1
**Luo Zetao (CHN) (120)**	**4**

**Round 1 (Last 128)**; Best of 7 frames
Reanne Evans (ENG) (80)	0
**Craig Steadman (ENG) (101)**	**4**
Liu Wenwei (CHN) (81)	0
**Ashley Carty (ENG) (104)**	**4**
Sahil Nayyar (CAN) (94)	0
**Oliver Sykes (ENG) (114)**	**4**
Michał Szubarczyk (POL) (75)	2
**Julien Leclercq (BEL) (112)**	**4**
Lan Yuhao (CHN) (76)	3
**Antoni Kowalski (POL) (107)**	**4**
**Ross Muir (SCO) (82)**	**4**
Panchaya Channoi (THA) (121)	1
Ng On Yee (HKG) (93)	2
**Jamie Clarke (WAL) (99)**	**4**
Alfie Burden (ENG) (96)	1
**Artemijs Žižins (LVA) (116)**	**4**
Zhao Hanyang (CHN) (79)	0
**T. Tirapongpaiboon (THA) (117)**	**4**
Ian Burns (ENG) (74) (Note: Ian Burns withdrew and so Duane Jones was given a walkover.)	w/d
Duane Jones (WAL) (a)	**w/o**
Yao Pengcheng (CHN) (77)	1
**Stuart Carrington (ENG) (100)**	**4**
**Liam Graham (SCO) (85)**	**4**
Kaylan Patel (ENG) (a)	0
Oliver Brown (ENG) (90)	1
**Wang Xinbo (CHN) (115)**	**4**
Steven Hallworth (ENG) (71)	0
**Liam Davies (WAL) (109)**	**4**
Alexander Ursenbacher (SUI) (87)	1
**Anton Kazakov (UKR) (113)**	**4**
**Gao Yang (CHN) (73)**	**4**
Joshua Thomond (ENG) (a)	1

**Round 2 (Last 96)**; Best of 7 frames
**Jordan Brown (NIR) (62)**	**4**
Craig Steadman (ENG) (101)	2
Ben Woollaston (ENG) (37)	1
**Ashley Carty (ENG) (104)**	**4**
**Fan Zhengyi (CHN) (55)**	**4**
Oliver Sykes (ENG) (114)	0
**Anthony McGill (SCO) (36)**	**4**
Julien Leclercq (BEL) (112)	1
Luca Brecel (BEL) (42)	3
**Antoni Kowalski (POL) (107)**	**4**
Liam Pullen (ENG) (64)	0
**Ross Muir (SCO) (82)**	**4**
Ryan Day (WAL) (35)	3
**Jamie Clarke (WAL) (99)**	**4**
Martin O'Donnell (ENG) (50)	2
**Artemijs Žižins (LVA) (116)**	**4**
Ben Mertens (BEL) (60)	0
**T. Tirapongpaiboon (THA) (117)**	**4**
**Matthew Selt (ENG) (41)**	**4**
Duane Jones (WAL) (a)	3
**Lyu Haotian (CHN) (59)**	**4**
Stuart Carrington (ENG) (100)	0
**Daniel Wells (WAL) (43)**	**4**
Liam Graham (SCO) (85)	1
Long Zehuang (CHN) (48)	3
**Wang Xinbo (CHN) (115)**	**4**
Liu Hongyu (CHN) (56)	3
**Liam Davies (WAL) (109)**	**4**
**Aaron Hill (IRL) (39)**	**4**
Anton Kazakov (UKR) (113)	1
Jiang Jun (CHN) (63)	3
**Gao Yang (CHN) (73)**	**4**

Note: w/d=withdrawn; w/o=walkover

== Century breaks ==
=== Main stage centuries ===
A total of 40 century breaks were made during the main stage of the tournament in Brentwood.

- 141 – Zhou Yuelong
- 140, 100 – Yuan Sijun
- 139, 111, 104 – Wu Yize
- 138, 103 – Pang Junxu
- 136, 132, 112, 103 – Mark Williams
- 133, 114 – Barry Hawkins
- 128, 115, 103, 101, 101 – Shaun Murphy
- 128, 112 – Mark Selby
- 123 – Wang Xinbo
- 119, 114, 103 – Ali Carter
- 115, 112, 110 – Judd Trump
- 113 – Oliver Lines
- 113 – Ricky Walden
- 112 – Luo Zetao
- 111 – Fan Zhengyi
- 109 – Antoni Kowalski
- 108, 106 – Zhang Anda
- 105 – Liam Davies
- 102, 100 – Zhao Xintong
- 101 – Chris Wakelin
- 100 – Xu Si

=== Qualifying stage centuries ===
A total of 32 century breaks were made during the qualifying stage of the tournament in Leicester.

- 139, 120 – Luo Zetao
- 137 – Michael Holt
- 134 – Sam Craigie
- 130 – Dylan Emery
- 129, 105 – Cheung Ka Wai
- 128, 120 – Marco Fu
- 124 – Daniel Wells
- 119 – Louis Heathcote
- 118, 106, 100 – David Grace
- 113, 108 – Xu Yichen
- 113, 106 – Liam Highfield
- 111 – Fan Zhengyi
- 109 – Mateusz Baranowski
- 107 – Julien Leclercq
- 107 – Long Zehuang
- 107 – Oliver Sykes
- 106 – Liam Graham
- 106 – Ross Muir
- 104 – Jackson Page
- 104 – Thanawat Tirapongpaiboon
- 103 – Alfie Burden
- 101 – Mitchell Mann
- 101 – Wang Xinbo
- 100 – Ashley Carty
- 100 – Lyu Haotian
