= 2026 Championship League (ranking) =

Snooker tournament, held June and July 2026

2026 BetVictor Championship League

Tournament information
- Dates: 22 June – 15 July 2026
- Venue: Leicester Arena
- City: Leicester
- Country: England
- Organisation: Matchroom Sport
- Format: Ranking event
- Total prize fund: £328,000
- Winner's share: £33,000
- Highest break: Si Jiahui (CHN) (147)

Final
- Champion: Jak Jones (WAL)
- Runner-up: David Gilbert (ENG)
- Score: 3–2

The 2026 Championship League (officially the 2026 BetVictor Championship League Snooker) was a professional ranking snooker tournament that took place from 22 June to 15 July 2026 at the Leicester Arena in Leicester, England. It was the seventh staging of the ranking edition of the tournament, which was first held in 2020. Organised by Matchroom Sport, it was the first ranking event of the 2026–27 snooker season, preceding the 2026 China Open. The winner received £33,000 from a total prize fund of £328,000.

Stephen Maguire was the defending champion, having defeated Joe O'Connor 3–1 in the final of the previous ranking edition, but he was eliminated in Stage two Group C.

Jak Jones won the tournament, defeating David Gilbert 3–2 in the final.

There were 53 century breaks made during Stage one, including a maximum by Si Jiahui in Group 6. There were 21 centuries made during Stage two, and 10 during Stage three.

== Format ==
The competition began with 32 rounds of group matches with each group consisting of four players. Two groups were played to a finish every day using a two‑table setup in the arena. The groups were contested using a round‑robin format, with six matches played in each group. All matches in group play were played as best‑of‑four frames, with three points awarded for a win and one point for a draw. Group positions were determined by points scored, frame difference and then head‑to‑head results between players who were tied. Places that were still tied were then determined by the highest break made in the group. If the highest break was also tied, the next highest break made by the players was used.

The 32 players that topped the group tables qualified for the group winners' stage, consisting of eight groups of four players. The eight winners from the group winners' stage qualified for the two final groups, with the final taking place later on the same day. The winner received the Championship League title and a place in the 2026 Champion of Champions.

=== Broadcasters ===
The event was broadcast by AMC Network in Hungary; BG Pathum in Thailand; Canal+ in Poland; Fox Sports in Australia; Eurasian Broadcasting in Ukraine and the Commonwealth of Independent States; Nova in Czechia and Slovakia; Rigour in mainland China; Sky Network in New Zealand; Sportscast in Taipei; TV3 in the Baltics; Viaplay in Iceland and the Netherlands; Viasat in Scandinavia; and by the Matchroom YouTube channels in all other territories.

=== Prize fund ===
The breakdown of prize money for the tournament is shown below.

- Stage one
- Winner: £3,000
- Runner-up: £2,000
- Third place: £1,000
- Fourth place: £0
- Stage two
- Winner: £4,000
- Runner-up: £3,000
- Third place: £2,000
- Fourth place: £1,000
- Stage three
- Winner: £6,000
- Runner-up: £4,000
- Third place: £2,000
- Fourth place: £1,000
- Final
- Winner: £20,000
- Runner-up: £10,000

- Tournament total: £328,000

Note: The champion receives a total of £33,000 (£3,000 + £4,000 + £6,000 + £20,000).

== Stage one ==
Stage one consisted of 32 groups, each having four players. Unlike other tournaments, where the defending champion is usually the top seed, the players were seeded according to their ranking, and the top 32 seeds were allocated to the 32 groups by their ranking number. Numbers in parentheses after the players' names denote the players' seeding, and (a) indicates amateur players not on the main World Snooker Tour.

=== Order of play ===
Order of play as follows:

Date	Group
22 June	Group 3
22 June	Group 24
23 June	Group 2
23 June	Group 27
24 June	Group 10
24 June	Group 25
25 June	Group 20
25 June	Group 21

Date	Group
26 June	Group 14
26 June	Group 28
27 June	Group 8
27 June	Group 15
29 June	Group 18
29 June	Group 29
30 June	Group 9
30 June	Group 23

Date	Group
1 July	Group 5
1 July	Group 16
2 July	Group 17
2 July	Group 30
3 July	Group 4
3 July	Group 22
4 July	Group 12
4 July	Group 19

Date	Group
6 July	Group 11
6 July	Group 13
7 July	Group 6
7 July	Group 26
8 July	Group 7
8 July	Group 31
9 July	Group 1
9 July	Group 32

=== Group 1 ===
Group 1 was played on 9 July. David Grace won the group, eliminating the top seed Zhao Xintong, and advanced to Stage 2 Group A.

==== Group 1 matches ====
- Zhao Xintong 3–0 Simon Blackwell
- David Grace 3–0 Gao Yang
- David Grace 3–0 Simon Blackwell
- Zhao Xintong 3–1 Gao Yang
- Gao Yang 2–2 Simon Blackwell
- Zhao Xintong 2–2 David Grace

==== Group 1 table ====
Pos.	Player	P	W	D	L	FW	FL	FD	HB	Pts.
1	David Grace (ENG) (64)	3	2	1	0	8	2	6	73	7
2	Zhao Xintong (CHN) (1)	3	2	1	0	8	3	5	140	7
3	Gao Yang (CHN) (65)	3	0	1	2	3	8	−5	95	1
4	Simon Blackwell (ENG) (a)	3	0	1	2	2	8	−6	52	1

=== Group 2 ===
Group 2 was played on 23 June. Ian Burns won the group and advanced to Stage 2 Group B.

==== Group 2 matches ====
- Steven Hallworth 3–1 Jeff Cundy
- Ian Burns 3–0 Jamie O'Neill
- Ian Burns 3–0 Jeff Cundy
- Steven Hallworth 0–3 Jamie O'Neill
- Jamie O'Neill 3–1 Jeff Cundy
- Steven Hallworth 1–3 Ian Burns

==== Group 2 table ====
Pos.	Player	P	W	D	L	FW	FL	FD	HB	Pts.
1	Ian Burns (ENG) (66)	3	3	0	0	9	1	8	97	9
2	Jamie O'Neill (ENG) (a)	3	2	0	1	6	4	2	70	6
3	Steven Hallworth (ENG) (63)	3	1	0	2	4	7	−3	75	3
4	Jeff Cundy (ENG) (a) (Note: Jeff Cundy replaced Mark Williams (seeded 2) who withdrew.)	3	0	0	3	2	9	−7	39	0

=== Group 3 ===
Group 3 was played on 22 June. Dylan Emery won the group and advanced to Stage 2 Group C.
Kyren Wilson withdrew after playing one match, as his home was burgled. A man was subsequently jailed for the burglary.

==== Group 3 matches ====
- Kyren Wilson 3–0 Haydon Pinhey
- Dylan Emery 3–1 Michał Szubarczyk
- Dylan Emery 2–2 Haydon Pinhey
- Kyren Wilson w/d–w/o Michał Szubarczyk
- Michał Szubarczyk 2–2 Haydon Pinhey
- Kyren Wilson w/d–w/o Dylan Emery

Note: w/d=withdrawn; w/o=walkover

==== Group 3 table ====
Pos.	Player	P	W	D	L	FW	FL	FD	HB	Pts.
1	Dylan Emery (WAL) (62)	2	1	1	0	5	3	2	107	4
2	Haydon Pinhey (ENG) (a)	2	0	2	0	4	4	0	55	2
3	Michał Szubarczyk (POL) (67)	2	0	1	1	3	5	−2	37	1
4	Kyren Wilson (ENG) (3)	0	0	0	0	0	0	0	–	0

=== Group 4 ===
Group 4 was played on 3 July. Iulian Boiko won the group and advanced to Stage 2 Group D.

==== Group 4 matches ====
- Iulian Boiko 3–0 Ian Martin
- Lan Yuhao 3–1 Joshua Thomond
- Lan Yuhao 3–0 Ian Martin
- Iulian Boiko 3–1 Joshua Thomond
- Joshua Thomond 3–1 Ian Martin
- Iulian Boiko 2–2 Lan Yuhao

==== Group 4 table ====
Pos.	Player	P	W	D	L	FW	FL	FD	HB	Pts.
1	Iulian Boiko (UKR) (61)	3	2	1	0	8	3	5	90	7
2	Lan Yuhao (CHN) (68)	3	2	1	0	8	3	5	85	7
3	Joshua Thomond (ENG) (a)	3	1	0	2	5	7	−2	47	3
4	Ian Martin (ENG) (a)	3	0	0	3	1	9	−8	44	0

Note: Iulian Boiko and Lan Yuhao finished Group 4 equal on points and frame difference. Their head-to-head was a draw. Boiko made a higher break (90) and so was placed above Lan in the group.
Boiko was the highest seed in Group 4 as there was an early withdrawal, so that there was no seed 4.

=== Group 5 ===
Group 5 was played on 1 July. Chris Wakelin won the group and advanced to Stage 2 Group E.

==== Group 5 matches ====
- Chris Wakelin 1–3 Brian Ochoiski
- Yao Pengcheng 1–3 Luke Pinches
- Yao Pengcheng 3–0 Brian Ochoiski
- Chris Wakelin 3–0 Luke Pinches
- Luke Pinches 3–1 Brian Ochoiski
- Chris Wakelin 3–0 Yao Pengcheng

==== Group 5 table ====
Pos.	Player	P	W	D	L	FW	FL	FD	HB	Pts.
1	Chris Wakelin (ENG) (5)	3	2	0	1	7	3	4	128	6
2	Luke Pinches (ENG) (a) (Note: Luke Pinches replaced Sam Craigie (seeded 60) who withdrew.)	3	2	0	1	6	5	1	40	6
3	Yao Pengcheng (CHN) (69)	3	1	0	2	4	6	−2	82	3
4	Brian Ochoiski (FRA) (a)	3	1	0	2	4	7	−3	48	3

=== Group 6 ===
Group 6 was played on 7 July. Marco Fu won the group and advanced to Stage 2 Group F.
Si Jiahui made the second maximum break of his professional career in the first frame of his match against Xu Yichen. It was the 243rd official maximum.

==== Group 6 matches ====
- Si Jiahui 2–2 Sean Maddocks
- Marco Fu 3–0 Xu Yichen
- Marco Fu 3–1 Sean Maddocks
- Si Jiahui 3–0 Xu Yichen
- Xu Yichen 1–3 Sean Maddocks
- Si Jiahui 2–2 Marco Fu

==== Group 6 table ====
Pos.	Player	P	W	D	L	FW	FL	FD	HB	Pts.
1	Marco Fu (HKG) (59)	3	2	1	0	8	3	5	106	7
2	Si Jiahui (CHN) (6)	3	1	2	0	7	4	3	147	5
3	Sean Maddocks (ENG) (a)	3	1	1	1	6	6	0	96	4
4	Xu Yichen (CHN) (70)	3	0	0	3	1	9	−8	40	0

=== Group 7 ===
Group 7 was played on 8 July. Jack Lisowski won the group and advanced to Stage 2 Group G.

==== Group 7 matches ====
- Jack Lisowski 3–0 Jack Bradford
- Liam Highfield 3–1 Zhao Hanyang
- Liam Highfield 3–1 Jack Bradford
- Jack Lisowski 3–0 Zhao Hanyang
- Zhao Hanyang 3–0 Jack Bradford
- Jack Lisowski 3–1 Liam Highfield

==== Group 7 table ====
Pos.	Player	P	W	D	L	FW	FL	FD	HB	Pts.
1	Jack Lisowski (ENG) (7)	3	3	0	0	9	1	8	87	9
2	Liam Highfield (ENG) (58)	3	2	0	1	7	5	2	98	6
3	Zhao Hanyang (CHN) (71)	3	1	0	2	4	6	−2	50	3
4	Jack Bradford (WAL) (a)	3	0	0	3	1	9	−8	36	0

=== Group 8 ===
Group 8 was played on 27 June. Amateur player Dean Young won the group and advanced to Stage 2 Group H.

==== Group 8 matches ====
- Thepchaiya Un-Nooh 2–2 Dean Young
- Louis Heathcote 3–0 Reanne Evans
- Louis Heathcote 1–3 Dean Young
- Thepchaiya Un-Nooh 2–2 Reanne Evans
- Reanne Evans 0–3 Dean Young
- Thepchaiya Un-Nooh 3–1 Louis Heathcote

==== Group 8 table ====
Pos.	Player	P	W	D	L	FW	FL	FD	HB	Pts.
1	Dean Young (SCO) (a)	3	2	1	0	8	3	5	107	7
2	Thepchaiya Un-Nooh (THA) (8)	3	1	2	0	7	5	2	86	5
3	Louis Heathcote (ENG) (57)	3	1	0	2	5	6	−1	111	3
4	Reanne Evans (ENG) (72)	3	0	1	2	2	8	−6	55	1

=== Group 9 ===
Group 9 was played on 30 June. Elliot Slessor won the group and advanced to Stage 2 Group H.

==== Group 9 matches ====
- Elliot Slessor 3–1 Robert Milkins
- Liam Pullen 2–2 Liu Wenwei
- Liam Pullen 3–1 Robert Milkins
- Elliot Slessor 2–2 Liu Wenwei
- Liu Wenwei 3–0 Robert Milkins
- Elliot Slessor 3–0 Liam Pullen

==== Group 9 table ====
Pos.	Player	P	W	D	L	FW	FL	FD	HB	Pts.
1	Elliot Slessor (ENG) (9)	3	2	1	0	8	3	5	130	7
2	Liu Wenwei (CHN) (73)	3	1	2	0	7	4	3	65	5
3	Liam Pullen (ENG) (56)	3	1	1	1	5	6	−1	86	4
4	Robert Milkins (ENG) (a)	3	0	0	3	2	9	−7	77	0

=== Group 10 ===
Group 10 was played on 24 June. Zhang Anda won the group and advanced to Stage 2 Group G.

==== Group 10 matches ====
- Zhang Anda 3–0 Daniel Womersley
- Jiang Jun 3–1 Ross Muir
- Jiang Jun 3–1 Daniel Womersley
- Zhang Anda 3–0 Ross Muir
- Ross Muir 2–2 Daniel Womersley
- Zhang Anda 3–1 Jiang Jun

==== Group 10 table ====
Pos.	Player	P	W	D	L	FW	FL	FD	HB	Pts.
1	Zhang Anda (CHN) (10)	3	3	0	0	9	1	8	115	9
2	Jiang Jun (CHN) (55)	3	2	0	1	7	5	2	77	6
3	Daniel Womersley (ENG) (a)	3	0	1	2	3	8	−5	96	1
4	Ross Muir (SCO) (74)	3	0	1	2	3	8	−5	85	1

Note: Daniel Womersley and Ross Muir finished Group 10 equal on points and frame difference. Their head-to-head was a draw. Womersley made a higher break (96) and so was placed above Muir in the group.

=== Group 11 ===
Group 11 was played on 6 July. Amateur Player Mark Joyce won the group and advanced to Stage 2 Group F.

==== Group 11 matches ====
- Stuart Bingham 1–3 Mark Joyce
- Jordan Brown 2–2 Mateusz Baranowski
- Jordan Brown 0–3 Mark Joyce
- Stuart Bingham 2–2 Mateusz Baranowski
- Mateusz Baranowski 3–1 Mark Joyce
- Stuart Bingham 2–2 Jordan Brown

==== Group 11 table ====
Pos.	Player	P	W	D	L	FW	FL	FD	HB	Pts.
1	Mark Joyce (ENG) (a)	3	2	0	1	7	4	3	77	6
2	Mateusz Baranowski (POL) (75)	3	1	2	0	7	5	2	109	5
3	Stuart Bingham (ENG) (11)	3	0	2	1	5	7	−2	62	2
4	Jordan Brown (NIR) (54)	3	0	2	1	4	7	−3	104	2

=== Group 12 ===
Group 12 was played on 4 July. Ali Carter won the group and advanced to Stage 2 Group E.

==== Group 12 matches ====
- Ali Carter 3–0 Patrick Whelan
- Jamie Jones 3–1 Leone Crowley
- Jamie Jones 3–1 Patrick Whelan
- Ali Carter 3–1 Leone Crowley
- Leone Crowley 0–3 Patrick Whelan
- Ali Carter 2–2 Jamie Jones

==== Group 12 table ====
Pos.	Player	P	W	D	L	FW	FL	FD	HB	Pts.
1	Ali Carter (ENG) (12)	3	2	1	0	8	3	5	97	7
2	Jamie Jones (WAL) (53)	3	2	1	0	8	4	4	107	7
3	Patrick Whelan (ENG) (a)	3	1	0	2	4	6	−2	68	3
4	Leone Crowley (IRL) (76)	3	0	0	3	2	9	−7	57	0

=== Group 13 ===
Group 13 was played on 6 July. Zhou Yuelong won the group and advanced to Stage 2 Group D.

==== Group 13 matches ====
- Zhou Yuelong 3–1 Allan Taylor
- Ben Mertens 1–3 Liam Graham
- Ben Mertens 0–3 Allan Taylor
- Zhou Yuelong 2–2 Liam Graham
- Liam Graham 2–2 Allan Taylor
- Zhou Yuelong 3–1 Ben Mertens

==== Group 13 table ====
Pos.	Player	P	W	D	L	FW	FL	FD	HB	Pts.
1	Zhou Yuelong (CHN) (13)	3	2	1	0	8	4	4	97	7
2	Liam Graham (SCO) (77)	3	1	2	0	7	5	2	46	5
3	Allan Taylor (ENG) (a)	3	1	1	1	6	5	1	71	4
4	Ben Mertens (BEL) (52)	3	0	0	3	2	9	−7	50	0

=== Group 14 ===
Group 14 was played on 26 June. Gary Wilson won the group and advanced to Stage 2 Group C.

==== Group 14 matches ====
- Gary Wilson 3–1 Duane Jones
- Lyu Haotian 1–3 Alexander Ursenbacher
- Lyu Haotian 2–2 Duane Jones
- Gary Wilson 3–0 Alexander Ursenbacher
- Alexander Ursenbacher 2–2 Duane Jones
- Gary Wilson 2–2 Lyu Haotian

==== Group 14 table ====
Pos.	Player	P	W	D	L	FW	FL	FD	HB	Pts.
1	Gary Wilson (ENG) (14)	3	2	1	0	8	3	5	75	7
2	Alexander Ursenbacher (SUI) (78)	3	1	1	1	5	6	−1	58	4
3	Lyu Haotian (CHN) (51)	3	0	2	1	5	7	−2	115	2
4	Duane Jones (WAL) (a)	3	0	2	1	5	7	−2	74	2

Note: Lyu Haotian and Duane Jones finished Group 14 equal on points and frame difference. Their head-to-head was a draw. Lyu made a higher break (115) and so was placed above Jones in the group.

=== Group 15 ===
Group 15 was played on 27 June. Pang Junxu won the group and advanced to Stage 2 Group B.

==== Group 15 matches ====
- Pang Junxu 2–2 Luo Zetao
- David Lilley 2–2 Fergal Quinn
- David Lilley 1–3 Luo Zetao
- Pang Junxu 3–0 Fergal Quinn
- Fergal Quinn 2–2 Luo Zetao
- Pang Junxu 2–2 David Lilley

==== Group 15 table ====
Pos.	Player	P	W	D	L	FW	FL	FD	HB	Pts.
1	Pang Junxu (CHN) (15)	3	1	2	0	7	4	3	94	5
2	Luo Zetao (CHN) (110)	3	1	2	0	7	5	2	101	5
3	David Lilley (ENG) (50)	3	0	2	1	5	7	−2	103	2
4	Fergal Quinn (NIR) (79)	3	0	2	1	4	7	−3	91	2

=== Group 16 ===
Group 16 was played on 1 July. Lei Peifan won the group and advanced to Stage 2 Group A.

==== Group 16 matches ====
- Lei Peifan 2–2 Wang Xinbo
- Ishpreet Singh Chadha 3–0 Chatchapong Nasa
- Ishpreet Singh Chadha 3–0 Wang Xinbo
- Lei Peifan 3–0 Chatchapong Nasa
- Chatchapong Nasa 2–2 Wang Xinbo
- Lei Peifan 3–1 Ishpreet Singh Chadha

==== Group 16 table ====
Pos.	Player	P	W	D	L	FW	FL	FD	HB	Pts.
1	Lei Peifan (CHN) (16)	3	2	1	0	8	3	5	101	7
2	Ishpreet Singh Chadha (IND) (49)	3	2	0	1	7	3	4	118	6
3	Wang Xinbo (CHN) (105)	3	0	2	1	4	7	−3	134	2
4	Chatchapong Nasa (THA) (80)	3	0	1	2	2	8	−6	73	1

=== Group 17 ===
Group 17 was played on 2 July. Liu Hongyu won the group and advanced to Stage 2 Group A.

==== Group 17 matches ====
- Joe O'Connor 3–0 Paul Norris
- Liu Hongyu 2–2 Oliver Brown
- Liu Hongyu 3–0 Paul Norris
- Joe O'Connor 3–0 Oliver Brown
- Oliver Brown 3–1 Paul Norris
- Joe O'Connor 1–3 Liu Hongyu

==== Group 17 table ====
Pos.	Player	P	W	D	L	FW	FL	FD	HB	Pts.
1	Liu Hongyu (CHN) (48)	3	2	1	0	8	3	5	121	7
2	Joe O'Connor (ENG) (17)	3	2	0	1	7	3	4	101	6
3	Oliver Brown (ENG) (81)	3	1	1	1	5	6	−1	71	4
4	Paul Norris (ENG) (109)	3	0	0	3	1	9	−8	21	0

=== Group 18 ===
Group 18 was played on 29 June. Hossein Vafaei won the group and advanced to Stage 2 Group B.

==== Group 18 matches ====
- Hossein Vafaei 3–1 Oliver Sykes
- Fan Zhengyi 2–2 Florian Nüßle
- Fan Zhengyi 3–0 Oliver Sykes
- Hossein Vafaei 3–0 Florian Nüßle
- Florian Nüßle 3–0 Oliver Sykes
- Hossein Vafaei 2–2 Fan Zhengyi

==== Group 18 table ====
Pos.	Player	P	W	D	L	FW	FL	FD	HB	Pts.
1	Hossein Vafaei (IRN) (18)	3	2	1	0	8	3	5	104	7
2	Fan Zhengyi (CHN) (47)	3	1	2	0	7	4	3	90	5
3	Florian Nüßle (AUT) (82)	3	1	1	1	5	5	0	67	4
4	Oliver Sykes (ENG) (104)	3	0	0	3	1	9	−8	32	0

=== Group 19 ===
Group 19 was played on 4 July. Stephen Maguire won the group and advanced to Stage 2 Group C.

==== Group 19 matches ====
- Stephen Maguire 1–3 Anton Kazakov
- Robbie Williams 2–2 Ng On-yee
- Robbie Williams 3–0 Anton Kazakov
- Stephen Maguire 3–0 Ng On-yee
- Ng On-yee 2–2 Anton Kazakov
- Stephen Maguire 3–0 Robbie Williams

==== Group 19 table ====
Pos.	Player	P	W	D	L	FW	FL	FD	HB	Pts.
1	Stephen Maguire (SCO) (19)	3	2	0	1	7	3	4	125	6
2	Robbie Williams (ENG) (46)	3	1	1	1	5	5	0	69	4
3	Anton Kazakov (UKR) (103)	3	1	1	1	5	6	−1	38	4
4	Ng On-yee (HKG) (83)	3	0	2	1	4	7	−3	64	2

=== Group 20 ===
Group 20 was played on 25 June. Scott Donaldson won the group and advanced to Stage 2 Group D.

==== Group 20 matches ====
- Yuan Sijun 3–0 Bai Yulu
- Scott Donaldson 3–1 Sahil Nayyar
- Scott Donaldson 2–2 Bai Yulu
- Yuan Sijun 2–2 Sahil Nayyar
- Sahil Nayyar 2–2 Bai Yulu
- Yuan Sijun 1–3 Scott Donaldson

==== Group 20 table ====
Pos.	Player	P	W	D	L	FW	FL	FD	HB	Pts.
1	Scott Donaldson (SCO) (45)	3	2	1	0	8	4	4	76	7
2	Yuan Sijun (CHN) (20)	3	1	1	1	6	5	1	57	4
3	Sahil Nayyar (CAN) (84)	3	0	2	1	5	7	−2	100	2
4	Bai Yulu (CHN) (100)	3	0	2	1	4	7	−3	61	2

=== Group 21 ===
Group 21 was played on 25 June. David Gilbert won the group and advanced to Stage 2 Group E.

==== Group 21 matches ====
- David Gilbert 3–0 Panchaya Channoi
- Ricky Walden 2–2 Mahmoud El Hareedy
- Ricky Walden 3–0 Panchaya Channoi
- David Gilbert 2–2 Mahmoud El Hareedy
- Mahmoud El Hareedy 3–0 Panchaya Channoi
- David Gilbert 3–1 Ricky Walden

==== Group 21 table ====
Pos.	Player	P	W	D	L	FW	FL	FD	HB	Pts.
1	David Gilbert (ENG) (21)	3	2	1	0	8	3	5	107	7
2	Mahmoud El Hareedy (EGY) (85)	3	1	2	0	7	4	3	79	5
3	Ricky Walden (ENG) (44)	3	1	1	1	6	5	1	55	4
4	Panchaya Channoi (THA) (111)	3	0	0	3	0	9	−9	16	0

=== Group 22 ===
Group 22 was played on 3 July. Jak Jones won the group and advanced to Stage 2 Group F.

==== Group 22 matches ====
- Jak Jones 3–0 Michael Larkov
- Oliver Lines 2–2 Alfie Burden
- Oliver Lines 1–3 Michael Larkov
- Jak Jones 2–2 Alfie Burden
- Alfie Burden 2–2 Michael Larkov
- Jak Jones 1–3 Oliver Lines

==== Group 22 table ====
Pos.	Player	P	W	D	L	FW	FL	FD	HB	Pts.
1	Jak Jones (WAL) (22)	3	1	1	1	6	5	1	112	4
2	Oliver Lines (ENG) (43)	3	1	1	1	6	6	0	68	4
3	Michael Larkov (UKR) (113)	3	1	1	1	5	6	−1	80	4
4	Alfie Burden (ENG) (86)	3	0	3	0	6	6	0	107	3

=== Group 23 ===
Group 23 was played on 30 June. Jimmy Robertson won the group and advanced to Stage 2 Group G.

==== Group 23 matches ====
- Jimmy Robertson 2–2 Hammad Miah
- Martin O'Donnell 3–0 Antoni Kowalski
- Martin O'Donnell 2–2 Hammad Miah
- Jimmy Robertson 2–2 Antoni Kowalski
- Antoni Kowalski 3–0 Hammad Miah
- Jimmy Robertson 3–0 Martin O'Donnell

==== Group 23 table ====
Pos.	Player	P	W	D	L	FW	FL	FD	HB	Pts.
1	Jimmy Robertson (ENG) (23)	3	1	2	0	7	4	3	60	5
2	Martin O'Donnell (ENG) (42)	3	1	1	1	5	5	0	59	4
3	Antoni Kowalski (POL) (97)	3	1	1	1	5	5	0	109	4
4	Hammad Miah (ENG) (93)	3	0	2	1	4	7	−3	68	2

Note: Martin O'Donnell and Antoni Kowalski finished Group 23 equal on points and frame difference. O'Donnell won their head-to-head and so was placed above Kowalski in the group.

=== Group 24 ===
Group 24 was played on 22 June. Xu Si won the group and advanced to Stage 2 Group H.

==== Group 24 matches ====
- Xu Si 3–1 Craig Steadman
- Michael Holt 3–1 Julien Leclercq
- Michael Holt 0–3 Craig Steadman
- Xu Si 2–2 Julien Leclercq
- Julien Leclercq 3–0 Craig Steadman
- Xu Si 2–2 Michael Holt

==== Group 24 table ====
Pos.	Player	P	W	D	L	FW	FL	FD	HB	Pts.
1	Xu Si (CHN) (24)	3	1	2	0	7	5	2	61	5
2	Julien Leclercq (BEL) (102)	3	1	1	1	6	5	1	74	4
3	Michael Holt (ENG) (41)	3	1	1	1	5	6	−1	68	4
4	Craig Steadman (ENG) (91)	3	1	0	2	4	6	−2	41	3

=== Group 25 ===
Group 25 was played on 24 June. Jackson Page won the group and advanced to Stage 2 Group H.

==== Group 25 matches ====
- Jackson Page 3–1 Ashley Hugill
- Long Zehuang 2–2 Artemijs Žižins
- Long Zehuang 2–2 Ashley Hugill
- Jackson Page 2–2 Artemijs Žižins
- Artemijs Žižins 2–2 Ashley Hugill
- Jackson Page 2–2 Long Zehuang

==== Group 25 table ====
Pos.	Player	P	W	D	L	FW	FL	FD	HB	Pts.
1	Jackson Page (WAL) (25)	3	1	2	0	7	5	2	120	5
2	Long Zehuang (CHN) (40)	3	0	3	0	6	6	0	95	3
3	Artemijs Žižins (LVA) (106)	3	0	3	0	6	6	0	82	3
4	Ashley Hugill (ENG) (96)	3	0	2	1	5	7	−2	76	2

Note: Long Zehuang and Artemijs Žižins finished Group 25 equal on points and frame difference. Their head-to-head was a draw. Long made a higher break (95) and so was placed above Žižins in the group.

=== Group 26 ===
Group 26 was played on 7 July. Cheung Ka Wai won the group and advanced to Stage 2 Group G.

==== Group 26 matches ====
- Cheung Ka Wai 3–1 Ashley Carty
- Matthew Stevens 2–2 George Pragnell
- Matthew Stevens 3–0 Ashley Carty
- Cheung Ka Wai 3–0 George Pragnell
- Ashley Carty 1–3 George Pragnell
- Matthew Stevens 0–3 Cheung Ka Wai

==== Group 26 table ====
Pos.	Player	P	W	D	L	FW	FL	FD	HB	Pts.
1	Cheung Ka Wai (HKG) (98)	3	3	0	0	9	1	8	111	9
2	Matthew Stevens (WAL) (39)	3	1	1	1	5	5	0	102	4
3	George Pragnell (ENG) (a) (Note: George Pragnell replaced Tom Ford (seeded 26) who withdrew.)	3	1	1	1	5	6	−1	75	4
4	Ashley Carty (ENG) (94)	3	0	0	3	2	9	−7	127	0

=== Group 27 ===
Group 27 was played on 23 June. Chang Bingyu won the group and advanced to Stage 2 Group F.

==== Group 27 matches ====
- Ryan Day 1–3 Jamie Clarke
- Chang Bingyu 3–0 Phil O'Kane
- Chang Bingyu 3–1 Jamie Clarke
- Ryan Day 3–0 Phil O'Kane
- Phil O'Kane 0–3 Jamie Clarke
- Ryan Day 0–3 Chang Bingyu

==== Group 27 table ====
Pos.	Player	P	W	D	L	FW	FL	FD	HB	Pts.
1	Chang Bingyu (CHN) (38)	3	3	0	0	9	1	8	145	9
2	Jamie Clarke (WAL) (89)	3	2	0	1	7	4	3	123	6
3	Ryan Day (WAL) (27)	3	1	0	2	4	6	−2	74	3
4	Phil O'Kane (ENG) (108)	3	0	0	3	0	9	−9	38	0

=== Group 28 ===
Group 28 was played on 26 June. He Guoqiang won the group and advanced to Stage 2 Group E.

==== Group 28 matches ====
- He Guoqiang 3–0 Dylan Smith
- Sean O'Sullivan 1–3 Liu Yang
- Sean O'Sullivan 3–0 Dylan Smith
- He Guoqiang 3–1 Liu Yang
- Liu Yang 3–1 Dylan Smith
- He Guoqiang 3–0 Sean O'Sullivan

==== Group 28 table ====
Pos.	Player	P	W	D	L	FW	FL	FD	HB	Pts.
1	He Guoqiang (CHN) (37)	3	3	0	0	9	1	8	93	9
2	Liu Yang (CHN) (114)	3	2	0	1	7	5	2	76	6
3	Sean O'Sullivan (ENG) (92)	3	1	0	2	4	6	−2	61	3
4	Dylan Smith (ENG) (a) (Note: Dylan Smith replaced Anthony McGill (seeded 28) who withdrew.)	3	0	0	3	1	9	−8	78	0

=== Group 29 ===
Group 29 was played on 29 June. Noppon Saengkham won the group and advanced to Stage 2 Group D.

==== Group 29 matches ====
- Ben Woollaston 3–0 Huang Jiahao
- Noppon Saengkham 3–1 Liam Davies
- Noppon Saengkham 3–0 Huang Jiahao
- Ben Woollaston 1–3 Liam Davies
- Liam Davies 3–0 Huang Jiahao
- Ben Woollaston 3–1 Noppon Saengkham

==== Group 29 table ====
Pos.	Player	P	W	D	L	FW	FL	FD	HB	Pts.
1	Noppon Saengkham (THA) (36)	3	2	0	1	7	4	3	123	6
2	Liam Davies (WAL) (99)	3	2	0	1	7	4	3	121	6
3	Ben Woollaston (ENG) (29)	3	2	0	1	7	4	3	78	6
4	Huang Jiahao (CHN) (95)	3	0	0	3	0	9	−9	48	0

Note: Noppon Saengkham, Liam Davies and Ben Woollaston all finished Group 29 equal on points and frame difference. Each player won their head-to-head by 3–1 and so the group placings were determined by the highest break.

=== Group 30 ===
Group 30 was played on 2 July. Stan Moody won the group and advanced to Stage 2 Group C.

==== Group 30 matches ====
- Stan Moody 2–2 Thanawat Tirapongpaiboon
- Daniel Wells 2–2 Stuart Carrington
- Daniel Wells 0–3 Thanawat Tirapongpaiboon
- Stan Moody 3–0 Stuart Carrington
- Stuart Carrington 2–2 Thanawat Tirapongpaiboon
- Stan Moody 3–1 Daniel Wells

==== Group 30 table ====
Pos.	Player	P	W	D	L	FW	FL	FD	HB	Pts.
1	Stan Moody (ENG) (30)	3	2	1	0	8	3	5	135	7
2	Thanawat Tirapongpaiboon (THA) (107)	3	1	2	0	7	4	3	114	5
3	Stuart Carrington (ENG) (90)	3	0	2	1	4	7	−3	48	2
4	Daniel Wells (WAL) (35)	3	0	1	2	3	8	−5	51	1

=== Group 31 ===
Group 31 was played on 8 July. Luca Brecel won the group and advanced to Stage 2 Group B.

==== Group 31 matches ====
- Aaron Hill 1–3 Deng Haohui
- Luca Brecel 3–0 Mitchell Mann
- Luca Brecel 3–0 Deng Haohui
- Aaron Hill 3–1 Mitchell Mann
- Mitchell Mann 3–1 Deng Haohui
- Aaron Hill 1–3 Luca Brecel

==== Group 31 table ====
Pos.	Player	P	W	D	L	FW	FL	FD	HB	Pts.
1	Luca Brecel (BEL) (34)	3	3	0	0	9	1	8	82	9
2	Aaron Hill (IRL) (31)	3	1	0	2	5	7	−2	107	3
3	Mitchell Mann (ENG) (88)	3	1	0	2	4	7	−3	78	3
4	Deng Haohui (CHN) (112)	3	1	0	2	4	7	−3	53	3

Note: Mitchell Mann and Deng Haohui finished Group 31 equal on points and frame difference. Mann won their head-to-head and so was placed above Deng in the group.

=== Group 32 ===
Group 32 was played on 9 July. Zak Surety won the group and advanced to Stage 2 Group A.

==== Group 32 matches ====
- Zak Surety 3–1 Gong Chenzhi
- Matthew Selt 3–1 Andrew Higginson
- Matthew Selt 3–1 Gong Chenzhi
- Zak Surety 2–2 Andrew Higginson
- Andrew Higginson 2–2 Gong Chenzhi
- Zak Surety 3–1 Matthew Selt

==== Group 32 table ====
Pos.	Player	P	W	D	L	FW	FL	FD	HB	Pts.
1	Zak Surety (ENG) (32)	3	2	1	0	8	4	4	137	7
2	Matthew Selt (ENG) (33)	3	2	0	1	7	5	2	103	6
3	Andrew Higginson (ENG) (87)	3	0	2	1	5	7	−2	53	2
4	Gong Chenzhi (CHN) (101)	3	0	1	2	4	8	−4	76	1

== Stage two ==
Stage two consisted of eight groups, each having four players, the 32 winners from Stage one. Numbers in parentheses after the players' names denote the players' seeding, and (a) indicates amateur players not on the main World Snooker Tour.

=== Order of play ===
Order of play as follows:

Date	Group
10 July	Group A
10 July	Group B
11 July	Group C
11 July	Group D

Date	Group
13 July	Group E
13 July	Group F
14 July	Group G
14 July	Group H

=== Group A ===
Group A was played on 10 July. Lei Peifan won the group and advanced to Stage 3 Winners' group 1.

==== Group A matches ====
- Lei Peifan 3–0 David Grace
- Zak Surety 0–3 Liu Hongyu
- Zak Surety 2–2 David Grace
- Lei Peifan 2–2 Liu Hongyu
- Liu Hongyu 1–3 David Grace
- Lei Peifan 2–2 Zak Surety

==== Group A table ====
Pos.	Player	P	W	D	L	FW	FL	FD	HB	Pts.
1	Lei Peifan (CHN) (16)	3	1	2	0	7	4	3	110	5
2	Liu Hongyu (CHN) (48)	3	1	1	1	6	5	1	82	4
3	David Grace (ENG) (64)	3	1	1	1	5	6	−1	101	4
4	Zak Surety (ENG) (32)	3	0	2	1	4	7	−3	75	2

=== Group B ===
Group B was played on 10 July. Hossein Vafaei won the group and advanced to Stage 3 Winners' group 2.

==== Group B matches ====
- Pang Junxu 1–3 Ian Burns
- Hossein Vafaei 3–0 Luca Brecel
- Hossein Vafaei 3–1 Ian Burns
- Pang Junxu 2–2 Luca Brecel
- Luca Brecel 3–0 Ian Burns
- Pang Junxu 2–2 Hossein Vafaei

==== Group B table ====
Pos.	Player	P	W	D	L	FW	FL	FD	HB	Pts.
1	Hossein Vafaei (IRN) (18)	3	2	1	0	8	3	5	110	7
2	Luca Brecel (BEL) (34)	3	1	1	1	5	5	0	49	4
3	Ian Burns (ENG) (66)	3	1	0	2	4	7	−3	66	3
4	Pang Junxu (CHN) (15)	3	0	2	1	5	7	−2	112	2

=== Group C ===
Group C was played on 11 July. Dylan Emery won the group, eliminating the defending champion Stephen Maguire, and advanced to Stage 3 Winners' group 2.

==== Group C matches ====
- Gary Wilson 2–2 Dylan Emery
- Stephen Maguire 2–2 Stan Moody
- Stephen Maguire 2–2 Dylan Emery
- Gary Wilson 1–3 Stan Moody
- Stan Moody 0–3 Dylan Emery
- Gary Wilson 3–1 Stephen Maguire

==== Group C table ====
Pos.	Player	P	W	D	L	FW	FL	FD	HB	Pts.
1	Dylan Emery (WAL) (62)	3	1	2	0	7	4	3	96	5
2	Gary Wilson (ENG) (14)	3	1	1	1	6	6	0	81	4
3	Stan Moody (ENG) (30)	3	1	1	1	5	6	−1	133	4
4	Stephen Maguire (SCO) (19)	3	0	2	1	5	7	−2	84	2

=== Group D ===
Group D was played on 11 July. Noppon Saengkham won the group and advanced to Stage 3 Winners' group 1.

==== Group D matches ====
- Zhou Yuelong 3–1 Iulian Boiko
- Noppon Saengkham 3–1 Scott Donaldson
- Noppon Saengkham 2–2 Iulian Boiko
- Zhou Yuelong 1–3 Scott Donaldson
- Scott Donaldson 3–1 Iulian Boiko
- Zhou Yuelong 1–3 Noppon Saengkham

==== Group D table ====
Pos.	Player	P	W	D	L	FW	FL	FD	HB	Pts.
1	Noppon Saengkham (THA) (36)	3	2	1	0	8	4	4	122	7
2	Scott Donaldson (SCO) (45)	3	2	0	1	7	5	2	102	6
3	Zhou Yuelong (CHN) (13)	3	1	0	2	5	7	−2	79	3
4	Iulian Boiko (UKR) (61)	3	0	1	2	4	8	−4	55	1

=== Group E ===
Group E was played on 13 July. David Gilbert won the group and advanced to Stage 3 Winners' group 1.

==== Group E matches ====
- Chris Wakelin 3–1 He Guoqiang
- Ali Carter 1–3 David Gilbert
- Ali Carter 2–2 He Guoqiang
- Chris Wakelin 1–3 David Gilbert
- David Gilbert 0–3 He Guoqiang
- Chris Wakelin 2–2 Ali Carter (Note: Ali Carter conceded the last frame before the break-off.)

==== Group E table ====
Pos.	Player	P	W	D	L	FW	FL	FD	HB	Pts.
1	David Gilbert (ENG) (21)	3	2	0	1	6	5	1	101	6
2	He Guoqiang (CHN) (37)	3	1	1	1	6	5	1	110	4
3	Chris Wakelin (ENG) (5)	3	1	1	1	6	6	0	92	4
4	Ali Carter (ENG) (12)	3	0	2	1	5	7	−2	56	2

=== Group F ===
Group F was played on 13 July. Jak Jones won the group and advanced to Stage 3 Winners' group 2.

==== Group F matches ====
- Jak Jones 2–2 Mark Joyce
- Chang Bingyu 3–1 Marco Fu
- Chang Bingyu 3–0 Mark Joyce
- Jak Jones 3–1 Marco Fu
- Marco Fu 3–0 Mark Joyce
- Jak Jones 3–1 Chang Bingyu

==== Group F table ====
Pos.	Player	P	W	D	L	FW	FL	FD	HB	Pts.
1	Jak Jones (WAL) (22)	3	2	1	0	8	4	4	102	7
2	Chang Bingyu (CHN) (38)	3	2	0	1	7	4	3	139	6
3	Marco Fu (HKG) (59)	3	1	0	2	5	6	−1	105	3
4	Mark Joyce (ENG) (a)	3	0	1	2	2	8	−6	51	1

=== Group G ===
Group G was played on 14 July. Zhang Anda won the group and advanced to Stage 3 Winners' group 2.

==== Group G matches ====
- Jack Lisowski 0–3 Cheung Ka Wai
- Zhang Anda 2–2 Jimmy Robertson
- Zhang Anda 3–0 Cheung Ka Wai
- Jack Lisowski 3–0 Jimmy Robertson
- Jimmy Robertson 3–0 Cheung Ka Wai
- Jack Lisowski 0–3 Zhang Anda

==== Group G table ====
Pos.	Player	P	W	D	L	FW	FL	FD	HB	Pts.
1	Zhang Anda (CHN) (10)	3	2	1	0	8	2	6	109	7
2	Jimmy Robertson (ENG) (23)	3	1	1	1	5	5	0	84	4
3	Cheung Ka Wai (HKG) (98)	3	1	0	2	3	6	−3	123	3
4	Jack Lisowski (ENG) (7)	3	1	0	2	3	6	−3	57	3

Note: Cheung Ka Wai and Jack Lisowski finished Group G equal on points and frame difference. Cheung won their head-to-head and so was placed above Lisowski in the group.

=== Group H ===
Group H was played on 14 July. Elliot Slessor won the group and advanced to Stage 3 Winners' group 1.

==== Group H matches ====
- Elliot Slessor 2–2 Dean Young
- Xu Si 3–1 Jackson Page
- Xu Si 2–2 Dean Young
- Elliot Slessor 3–1 Jackson Page
- Jackson Page 2–2 Dean Young
- Elliot Slessor 3–1 Xu Si

==== Group H table ====
Pos.	Player	P	W	D	L	FW	FL	FD	HB	Pts.
1	Elliot Slessor (ENG) (9)	3	2	1	0	8	4	4	139	7
2	Xu Si (CHN) (24)	3	1	1	1	6	6	0	83	4
3	Dean Young (SCO) (a)	3	0	3	0	6	6	0	82	3
4	Jackson Page (WAL) (25)	3	0	1	2	4	8	−4	120	1

== Stage three ==
Stage three consisted of two groups, each having four players, the eight winners from Stage two. Numbers in parentheses after the players' names denote the players' seeding.

=== Winners' group 1 ===
Winners' group 1 was played on 15 July. David Gilbert won the group and advanced to the final.

==== Winners' group 1 matches ====
- Elliot Slessor 0–3 Noppon Saengkham
- Lei Peifan 1–3 David Gilbert
- Lei Peifan 1–3 Noppon Saengkham
- Elliot Slessor 2–2 David Gilbert
- David Gilbert 3–1 Noppon Saengkham
- Elliot Slessor 2–2 Lei Peifan

==== Winners' group 1 table ====
Pos.	Player	P	W	D	L	FW	FL	FD	HB	Pts.
1	David Gilbert (ENG) (21)	3	2	1	0	8	4	4	140	7
2	Noppon Saengkham (THA) (36)	3	2	0	1	7	4	3	127	6
3	Elliot Slessor (ENG) (9)	3	0	2	1	4	7	−3	71	2
4	Lei Peifan (CHN) (16)	3	0	1	2	4	8	−4	38	1

=== Winners' group 2 ===
Winners' group 2 was played on 15 July. Jak Jones won the group and advanced to the final.

==== Winners' group 2 matches ====
- Zhang Anda 0–3 Dylan Emery
- Hossein Vafaei 0–3 Jak Jones
- Hossein Vafaei 3–0 Dylan Emery
- Zhang Anda 2–2 Jak Jones
- Jak Jones 3–0 Dylan Emery
- Zhang Anda 2–2 Hossein Vafaei

==== Winners' group 2 table ====
Pos.	Player	P	W	D	L	FW	FL	FD	HB	Pts.
1	Jak Jones (WAL) (22)	3	2	1	0	8	2	6	116	7
2	Hossein Vafaei (IRN) (18)	3	1	1	1	5	5	0	130	4
3	Dylan Emery (WAL) (62)	3	1	0	2	3	6	−3	81	3
4	Zhang Anda (CHN) (10)	3	0	2	1	4	7	−3	120	2

=== Final ===
Final: Best of 5 frames. Referee: Andrew Barklam; Leicester Arena, Leicester, England, 15 July 2026
David Gilbert (21); England	2–3	Jak Jones (22); Wales
Frame scores: 104–0 (104), 16–100, 66–0, 0–95, 19–69
(frame 1) 104	Highest break	86 (frame 4)
1	Century breaks	0

== Century breaks ==
A total of 84 century breaks were made during the tournament, 53 in Stage one, 21 in Stage two, and 10 in Stage three.

- 147 – Si Jiahui
- 145, 139, 127, 102 – Chang Bingyu
- 140, 139, 105 – Zhao Xintong
- 140, 107, 104, 104, 102, 101, 101 – David Gilbert
- 139, 130, 130, 122 – Elliot Slessor
- 137, 136 – Zak Surety
- 135, 133, 104 – Stan Moody
- 134 – Wang Xinbo
- 130, 110, 104 – Hossein Vafaei
- 128 – Chris Wakelin
- 127, 123, 122 – Noppon Saengkham
- 127 – Ashley Carty
- 125 – Stephen Maguire
- 123, 111 – Cheung Ka Wai
- 123, 101 – Jamie Clarke
- 121 – Liam Davies
- 121 – Liu Hongyu
- 120, 120 – Jackson Page
- 120, 115, 111, 109, 107, 104 – Zhang Anda
- 118 – Ishpreet Singh Chadha
- 116, 112, 107, 102, 101 – Jak Jones
- 115 – Lyu Haotian
- 114 – Thanawat Tirapongpaiboon
- 112 – Pang Junxu
- 111 – Louis Heathcote
- 110, 104, 101 – Lei Peifan
- 110 – He Guoqiang
- 109, 102 – Mateusz Baranowski
- 109 – Antoni Kowalski
- 107, 103, 100 – Dylan Emery
- 107, 101 – Alfie Burden
- 107 – Aaron Hill
- 107 – Jamie Jones
- 107 – Dean Young
- 106, 105 – Marco Fu
- 104 – Jordan Brown
- 103 – David Lilley
- 103 – Matthew Selt
- 102 – Scott Donaldson
- 102 – Matthew Stevens
- 101 – David Grace
- 101 – Luo Zetao
- 101 – Joe O'Connor
- 100 – Sahil Nayyar
