= Wang Xinbo (snooker player) =

Chinese snooker player

Personal information
- Born: 11 January 2008 (age 18) Dalian, Liaoning, China

Sport
- Country: China
- Sport: Snooker
- Professional: 2026–present
- Highest ranking: 82 (7 November 2026)
- Current ranking: 82 (as of 7 November 2026)

Wang Xinbo (Chinese: 王信伯; pinyin: Wáng Xīnbó; born 11 January 2008) is a Chinese professional snooker player. He has a two-year card on the World Snooker Tour, from the 2026–27 snooker season.

== Career ==
Wang reached the semi-finals at the 2023 CBSA Zhang Jiagang Youth Event Under-21 tournament. As an amateur, he was awarded a number of wildcard places into event on the professional tour, such as the 2023 Wuhan Open, where he was defeated by Anthony Hamilton in October 2023. Awarded a wildcard into the 2023 International Championship in Tianjin in November, he defeated Ben Woollaston 6-4 before facing Welshman Dylan Emery.

At the 2024 World Open in March 2024, he defeated Matthew Selt to qualify for the main draw. At the 2024 Xi'an Grand Prix he led multiple-time world champion Mark Selby 3-2 but ultimately lost 5-3. He lost 6-3 to former world champion Mark Willians at the 2024 Shanghai Masters in July 2024. He faced compatriot Si Jiahui at the 2025 Shanghai Masters in July 2025. That season, he played at the 2025 Xi'an Grand Prix in October, losing to reigning world champion Zhao Xintong.

In January 2026, he was finalist at the WSF Junior Snooker Championship, in Sofia, Bulgaria. Having not lost a frame in the group stage, and recording wins over Vladislav Gradinari and Joel Connolly enroute, he beat Englishman Daniel Boyes 4-0 in the semi-final, before ultimately losing the final 5-2 to Mykhailo Larkov of Ukraine. The following week, he advanced to the knockout stages of the Open WSF Championship in Sofia, defeating Joel Connolly again to set up a semi-final match against Ryan Davies, which he won on the final black in the deciding frame. In the final he faced former professional Hammad Miah with the match again going to a deciding frame, losing 5-4.

He was drawn against Mitchell Mann in the first round of qualifying for the 2026 World Snooker Championship, winning 10-4 before facing Iulian Boiko, also winning 10-4, to set up a third round match against former world champion Stuart Bingham, losing 10-2. That year, he topped the rankings on the CBSA Tour alongside Luo Zetao and earned a two-year card on the World Snooker Tour, from the 2026–27 snooker season.

In June 2026, he had his first match wins as a professional with defeats of Liam Graham and Scott Donaldson to set up a match against former champion Xiao Guodong in the qualifying rounds of the 2026 Wuhan Open. In September 2026, he defeated David Lilley and Liam Graham to reach the main draw at the 2026 Northern Ireland Open, going on to reach the last-32. He defeated David Gilbert and Neil Robertson to reach the last-16 of a ranking tournament for the first time at the 2026 International Championship.

== Personal life ==
His younger brother Wang Xinzhong is also a snooker player.

== Performance and rankings timeline ==
Tournament	2023/ 24	2024/ 25	2025/ 26	2026/ 27
Ranking (Note: It shows the ranking at the beginning of the season)	(Note: He was an amateur)			(Note: New players on the Main Tour don't have a ranking)
Ranking tournaments
Championship League	A	A	A	RR
China Open	Not Held			LQ
Wuhan Open	LQ	1R	1R	LQ
British Open	A	A	A	2R
English Open	A	A	A	2R
Shenzhen Open (Note: The event was called the Xi'an Grand Prix (2024/2025–2025/2026))	NH	LQ	LQ	LQ
Northern Ireland Open	A	A	A	2R
International Championship	1R	LQ	LQ	3R
UK Championship	A	A	A	
Shoot Out	A	A	A	
Scottish Open	A	A	A	LQ
German Masters	A	A	A	
Welsh Open	A	A	A	
World Grand Prix	DNQ	DNQ	DNQ	
Players Championship	DNQ	DNQ	DNQ	
World Open	1R	A	LQ	
Tour Championship	DNQ	DNQ	DNQ	
World Championship	A	A	LQ	
Non-ranking tournaments
Shanghai Masters	A	1R	1R	

Performance Table Legend
LQ	lost in the qualifying draw	#R	lost in the early rounds of the tournament (WR = Wildcard round, RR = Round robin)	QF	lost in the quarter-finals
SF	lost in the semi-finals	F	lost in the final	W	won the tournament
DNQ	did not qualify for the tournament	A	did not participate in the tournament	WD	withdrew from the tournament

NH / Not Held	means an event was not held
NR / Non-Ranking Event	means an event is/was no longer a ranking event
R / Ranking Event	means an event is/was a ranking event
MR / Minor-Ranking Event	means an event is/was a minor-ranking event
