= Luo Zetao =

Chinese snooker player

Personal information
- Born: 14 February 2001 (age 25) Loudi, Hunan, China

Sport
- Country: China
- Sport: Snooker
- Professional: 2026-present
- Highest ranking: 98 (4 October 2026)
- Current ranking: 99 (as of 26 October 2026)

Luo Zetao (Chinese: 罗泽涛; born 14 February 2001) is a Chinese snooker player. He has a two-year card on the World Snooker Tour from the start of the 2026–27 snooker season.

== Career ==
In April 2023, he was defeated by Jiang Jun at the CBSA Qualifiers for the World Snooker Tour.

Competing at the Asia-Oceania Q School Event 1 in Thailand in May 2025, he defeated former professional Peng Yisong 4-2 before losing 4-3 in the semifinals to compatriot Liu Wenwei. In event two, he reached the last-16 before losing to Indian former professional Pankaj Advani.

In May 2026, he finished in the top-two of the rankings on the CBSA Tour alongside Wang Xinbo, and earned a two-year card on the World Snooker Tour, from the 2026–27 snooker season.

Competing in the 2026 Championship League in June, he went undefeated in his round-robin group against Pang Junxu, Fergal Quinn and David Lilley, missing out on top spot to Pang by a single frame on frame difference. In September, he recorded a win over former world champion Neil Robertson to reach the last-32 at the 2026 English Open.

== Performance and rankings timeline ==
Tournament	2018/ 19	2026/ 27
Ranking (Note: It shows the ranking at the beginning of the season)	(Note: He was an amateur)	(Note: Players qualified through Q School started the season without ranking points)
Ranking tournaments
Championship League	A	RR
China Open	NH	LQ
Wuhan Open	A	LQ
British Open	A	LQ
English Open	A	2R
Shenzhen Open	NH	LQ
Northern Ireland Open	A	LQ
International Championship	LQ	LQ
UK Championship	A	
Shoot Out	A	
Scottish Open	A	LQ
German Masters	A	
Welsh Open	A	
World Grand Prix	DNQ	
Players Championship	DNQ	
World Open	LQ	
Tour Championship	DNQ	
World Championship	A	
Former ranking tournaments
China Championship	LQ	NH

Performance Table Legend
LQ	lost in the qualifying draw	#R	lost in the early rounds of the tournament (WR = Wildcard round, RR = Round robin)	QF	lost in the quarter-finals
SF	lost in the semi-finals	F	lost in the final	W	won the tournament
DNQ	did not qualify for the tournament	A	did not participate in the tournament	WD	withdrew from the tournament

NH / Not Held	means an event was not held
NR / Non-Ranking Event	means an event is/was no longer a ranking event
R / Ranking Event	means an event is/was a ranking event
MR / Minor-Ranking Event	means an event is/was a minor-ranking event
