= Liu Wenwei =

Chinese snooker player (born 2003)

Personal information
- Born: 8 December 2003 (age 22)

Sport
- Country: China
- Sport: Snooker
- Professional: 2025–present
- Highest ranking: 82 (July 2026)
- Current ranking: 86 (as of 7 November 2026)

Liu Wenwei (born 8 December 2003) is a Chinese snooker player. He earned a two-year card on the World Snooker Tour, starting with the 2025-26 snooker season.

== Career ==
In March 2024, he was a semi-finalist in the U21 Asia Pacific Regional Snooker Championships in Sydney, Australia, won by Lei Peifan.

Competing at the Asia-Oceania Q School Event 1 in Thailand in May 2025, he earned a two-year card on the World Snooker Tour after he recorded wins over former professionals Tian Pengfei and Manasawin Phetmalaikul before having 4-3 victoires over Nattanapong Chaikul and compatriot Luo Zetao, with eligibility from the 2025-26 snooker season.

He started the 2025-26 season in June 2025 in the qualifying round for the Wuhan Open with a creditable 5-4 defeat against established professional Jamie Jones.

He was drawn in the round-robin stage of the 2025 Championship League, a ranking tournament in Leicester in June 2025, against Jackson Page, Jordan Brown and English amateur champion Zachary Richardson. He topped the group after a 3-0 win over Brown, beating Page 3-1 and coming away with a 2-2 draw against Richardson, from 0-2 down. He recorded a 6-4 win over former world champion Luca Brecel in qualifying at the 2025 International Championship.

In November 2026, he was suspended from the World Snooker Tour amid an investigation into him being party to approaches made to players to fix matches, and failing to report approaches made to him to fix matches.

== Performance and rankings timeline ==
Tournament	2025/ 26	2026/ 27
Ranking (Note: It shows the ranking at the beginning of the season)	(Note: New players on the Main Tour don't have a ranking)	83
Ranking tournaments
Championship League	2R	RR
China Open	NH	LQ
Wuhan Open	LQ	LQ
British Open	LQ	LQ
English Open	LQ	LQ
Shenzhen Open (Note: The event was called the Xi'an Grand Prix (2025/2026))	LQ	LQ
Northern Ireland Open	LQ	LQ
International Championship	1R	LQ
UK Championship	LQ	WD
Shoot Out	1R	WD
Scottish Open	LQ	LQ
German Masters	LQ	LQ
Welsh Open	1R	WD
World Grand Prix	DNQ	DNQ
Players Championship	DNQ	DNQ
World Open	1R	WD
Tour Championship	DNQ	DNQ
World Championship	LQ	WD
Former ranking tournaments
Saudi Arabia Masters	1R	NH

Performance Table Legend
LQ	lost in the qualifying draw	#R	lost in the early rounds of the tournament (WR = Wildcard round, RR = Round robin)	QF	lost in the quarter-finals
SF	lost in the semi-finals	F	lost in the final	W	won the tournament
DNQ	did not qualify for the tournament	A	did not participate in the tournament	WD	withdrew from the tournament

NH / Not Held	means an event was not held.
NR / Non-Ranking Event	means an event is/was no longer a ranking event.
R / Ranking Event	means an event is/was a ranking event.
MR / Minor-Ranking Event	means an event is/was a minor-ranking event.
