= 2026 World Open (snooker) =

March 2026 snooker competition in China

2026 Likang Roasted Eel – Junma Cup World Open

Tournament information
- Dates: 16–22 March 2026
- Venue: Yushan Sport Centre
- City: Yushan
- Country: China
- Organisation: World Snooker Tour
- Format: Ranking event
- Total prize fund: £825,000
- Winner's share: £175,000
- Highest break: Ronnie O'Sullivan (ENG) (153)

Final
- Champion: Thepchaiya Un-Nooh (THA)
- Runner-up: Ronnie O'Sullivan (ENG)
- Score: 10–7

The 2026 World Open (officially the 2026 Likang Roasted Eel – Junma Cup World Open) was a professional snooker tournament that took place from 16 to 22 March 2026 at the Yushan Sport Centre in Yushan, China. Qualifiers took place from 10 to 12 February at the Barnsley Metrodome in Barnsley, England. The 11th edition of the tournament since it was rebranded as the World Open in 2010, it was the 16th ranking event of the 2025–26 snooker season, following the 2026 Welsh Open and preceding the 2026 Tour Championship. The tournament was broadcast by TNT Sports and Discovery+ in the United Kingdom and Ireland, by Eurosport in mainland Europe, by local channels in Asia and Africa, and by WST Play in all other territories. The winner received £175,000 from a total prize fund of £825,000.

John Higgins was the defending champion, having defeated Joe O'Connor 10–6 in the 2025 final. He played the record-extending 2,000th match of his professional career in the last 64 but lost 4–5 to Stan Moody. After beating the world number one Judd Trump 6–4 in the semi-finals, Thepchaiya Un-Nooh defeated Ronnie O'Sullivan 10–7 in the final to win his first World Open title and the second ranking title of his career. Un-Nooh became the second Thai player, after James Wattana, to win a full-format ranking tournament.

The tournament produced 119 century breaks, 32 at the qualifiers in Barnsley and 87 at the main stage in Yushan. O'Sullivan made the highest break in professional snooker history, a 16-red clearance of 153, during his quarter-final victory over Ryan Day. It was the second break exceeding 147 in professional competition, following the 148 made by Jamie Burnett in the qualifying rounds of the 2004 UK Championship. Un-Nooh compiled a maximum break, the seventh of his professional career, in the penultimate frame of the final. It was the record-extending 23rd maximum of the season.

== Overview ==
The World Open originated as the Professional Players Tournament, of which Ray Reardon won the inaugural 1982 edition, defeating Jimmy White 10–5 in the final. Staged mostly as the Grand Prix from 1984 to 2009 (except 2001 to 2003, when it was held as the LG Cup), the tournament was played in England until 2004, after which it moved to Scotland. It was rebranded as the World Open in 2010. The tournament was not held in 2011, and the following year it moved to Haikou, China. The 2015 edition was cancelled after the contract with the promoter was not renewed, and in 2016 the tournament moved to Yushan. It was not held from 2020 to 2023 due to the COVID-19 pandemic but returned to the calendar for the 2024 edition.

The 2026 edition of the tournament—its 11th staging since it became the World Open in 2010—took place from 16 to 22 March at the Yushan Sport Centre in Yushan, China. Qualifiers took place from 10 to 12 February at the Barnsley Metrodome in Barnsley, England. It was the 16th ranking event of the 2025–26 snooker season, following the 2026 Welsh Open and preceding the 2026 Tour Championship. John Higgins was the defending champion, having defeated Joe O'Connor 10–6 in the 2025 final.

=== Format ===
All matches were played as the best of 9 frames up to and including the quarter-finals. The semi-finals were the best of 11 frames and the final was a best-of-19-frame match played over two sessions.

Neil Robertson withdrew before the qualifiers in Barnsley. Chris Totten withdrew before the held-over qualifiers in Yushan. Mark Selby, Barry Hawkins, Stephen Maguire, David Gilbert, Chris Wakelin, Jak Jones, Umut Dikme, and Ishpreet Singh Chadha all won their qualifying matches but withdrew prior to the main stage.

=== Broadcasters ===
The qualifying matches played in Barnsley were broadcast in the United Kingdom, Germany, Italy, and Austria by Discovery+ and in other European territories by HBO Max. They were broadcast in mainland China by the CBSA‑WPBSA Academy WeChat Channel, the CBSA‑WPBSA Academy Douyin, Huya Live, and Migu. In all other territories (including Ireland) they were streamed by WST Play.

The main stage was broadcast in the United Kingdom and Ireland by TNT Sports and Discovery+. It was broadcast in mainland Europe by Eurosport, with streaming coverage on Discovery+ in Germany, Italy, and Austria and on HBO Max in other European territories. It was broadcast in mainland China by the same broadcasters as the qualifying matches; in Hong Kong by Now TV; in Malaysia and Brunei by Astro SuperSport; in Taiwan by Sportcast; in Thailand by True Sports; in Singapore by StarHub TV; in the Philippines by TAP Sports; and in Nigeria, South Africa, Ghana, and Kenya by SportyTV. In territories where no other coverage was available, it was streamed by WST Play.

=== Prize fund ===
The breakdown of prize money for the event is shown below:

- Winner: £175,000
- Runner-up: £75,000
- Semi-final: £33,000
- Quarter-final: £22,000
- Last 16: £14,000
- Last 32: £9,000
- Last 64: £5,000
- Highest break: £5,000
- Total: £825,000

== Summary ==
=== Qualifying ===
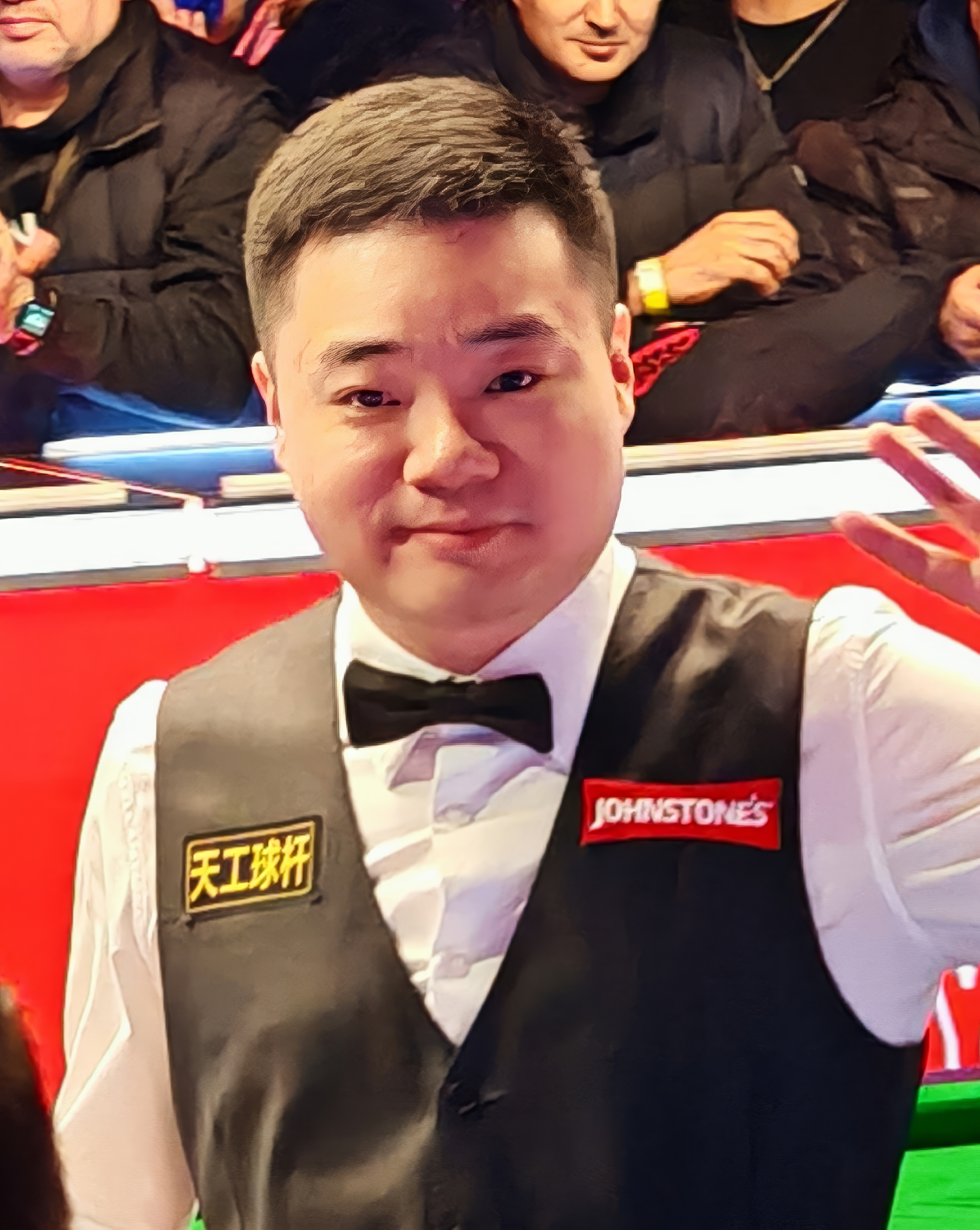
The 12th seed Ding Junhui (pictured in 2025) was the highest-ranked player to lose in the Barnsley qualifiers. Marco Fu defeated him 5–2.

Neil Robertson, the fifth seed, withdrew from the qualifying matches played in Barnsley and was replaced by amateur player Umut Dikme, who beat Oliver Brown in a deciding frame. Mark Allen, who had claimed consecutive World Open titles in 2012 and 2013, made century breaks of 124 and 108 as he defeated Louis Heathcote 5–2. Shaun Murphy trailed Chatchapong Nasa 1–2 but recovered to win 5–3, and Stephen Maguire produced a century of 140 as he beat Sanderson Lam 5–1. Stuart Bingham advanced with a whitewash win over Ng On-yee, while He Guoqiang made a century of 104 to win the deciding frame against Amir Sarkhosh. Antoni Kowalski won the first four frames against Liu Hongyu, but Liu also won four consecutive frames, tying the scores at 4–4. Kowalski made a 90 break to win the decider.

Kyren Wilson, the world number two, made breaks including 89 and 64 as he whitewashed Alexander Ursenbacher in 68 minutes, and Mark Williams also whitewashed Kreishh Gurbaxani, making breaks including 67, 95, 95, and 57. Michael Holt lost the first two frames against Ken Doherty but made breaks including 88 and 89 as he won five consecutive frames for a 5–2 victory. Ali Carter beat Jimmy White by the same score. Daniel Wells recovered from 2–4 behind to defeat Robbie McGuigan, making an 86 break in the deciding frame. Scott Donaldson produced a 141 break against Xu Yichen, but Xu won the match in a decider. Luca Brecel defeated Mateusz Baranowski, also in a deciding frame.

Marco Fu made breaks including 86, 91, and 116 as he defeated the 2017 champion Ding Junhui 5–2. The result put Ding, who had not qualified for the 2026 Players Championship or 2026 Tour Championship and had not entered the 2026 Welsh Open, at risk of losing his top-16 ranking before the 2026 World Championship. Another top-16 Chinese player, Si Jiahui, also exited after a 3–5 defeat to Zhao Hanyang. From 3–4 behind, Stan Moody recovered to beat Jiang Jun on the final black of a deciding frame. Haydon Pinhey made a 137 break in his match against Mark Selby, but Selby went on to win in a deciding frame. Jack Lisowski advanced with a 5–2 victory over Gong Chenzhi, winning his first match at a ranking event since early in November 2025. Wu Yize produced a 131 break as he won four consecutive frames to defeat Liam Pullen by the same score. Robert Milkins, Jamie Jones, and Mark Davis all lost their qualifying matches, putting them in danger of relegation from the tour at the end of the season. The previous year's runner-up Joe O'Connor lost 3–5 to Liu Wenwei.

=== Main stage ===
==== Held-over qualifying matches ====
In the held-over qualifiers played in Yushan, the world number one Judd Trump advanced with a 5–1 win over amateur player Mark Lloyd, who replaced Chris Totten. In the fifth frame of his match against Ross Muir, Ronnie O'Sullivan came close to making a maximum break, but he went in-off the 15th black, ending the break on 113. He completed a 5–1 victory with his second century of the match, a 114. "I got here a week early just to do some practising on my own," O'Sullivan said afterwards. "I've been working really hard on my game. I know I haven't played a lot of tournaments, but I've been working because my game has been in such a bad place. It isn't like I've had my feet up while everyone has been playing. I've decided I really need to attack this now. I have one last throw of the dice really. The last three years have been awful in terms of confidence. I'm trying to work on that now and see if I can get back to delivering the cue freely." O'Sullivan added that he would devote two years to restoring his game, with the goal of prolonging his playing career.

The defending champion John Higgins trailed Liam Highfield 2–3 but won three consecutive frames for a 5–3 victory. Higgins said afterwards: "[Highfield] was just playing flawless. His safety, everything was flawless. He just ran out of position in the sixth frame and that allowed me to get into it and make a clearance. I managed to get over the line." The reigning World Champion Zhao Xintong made two century breaks as he whitewashed his wildcard opponent Han Fuyuan. Teenage wildcard Wang Xinbo made a century of 141 as he whitewashed Mitchell Mann in a pre‑qualifying match. Ricky Walden defeated Wang in the qualifying round, making two centuries as he secured a 5–2 win.

==== Last 64 ====
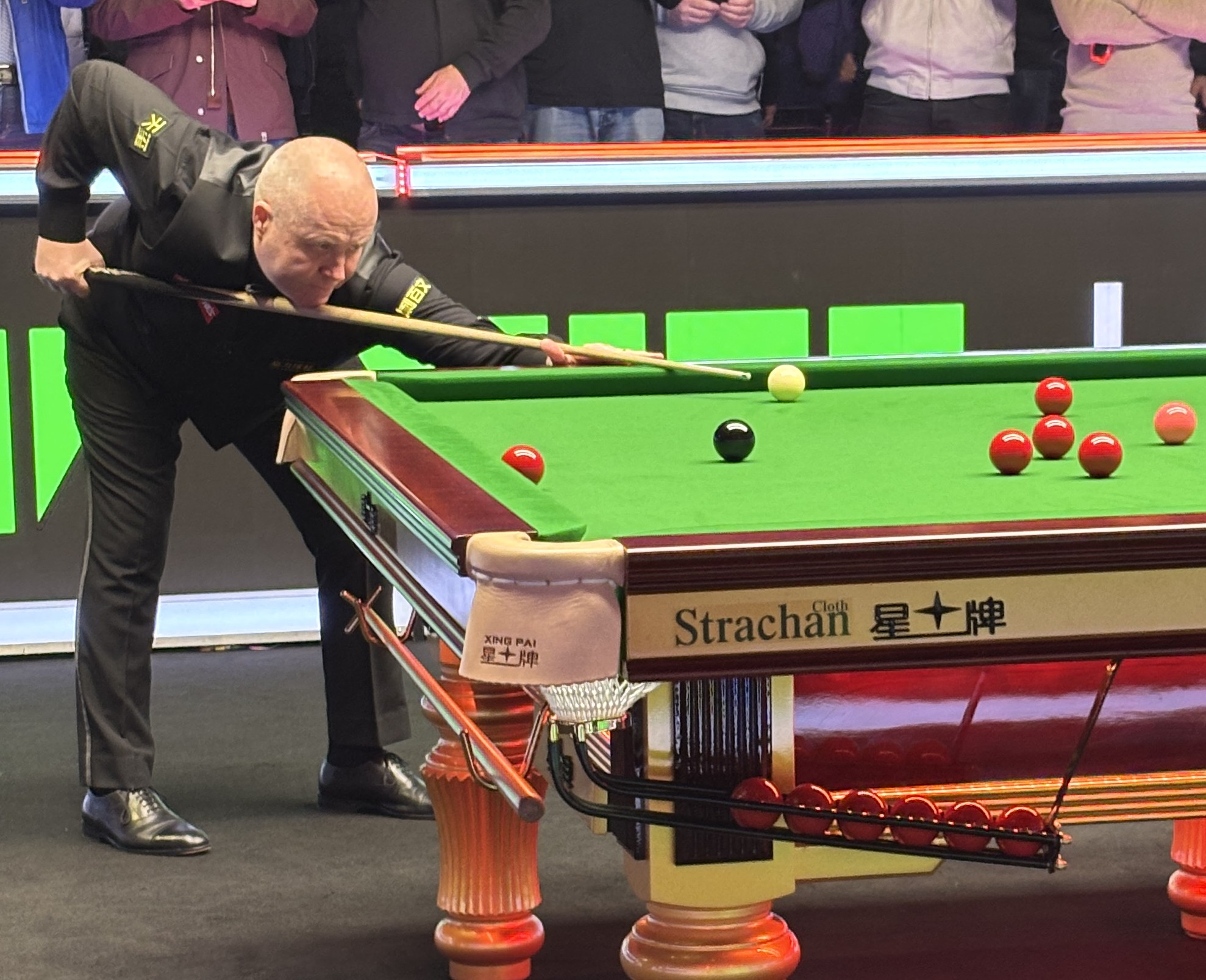
The defending champion John Higgins (pictured in 2026) played the 2,000th professional match of his career. He lost to Stan Moody in a deciding frame.

Selby, Barry Hawkins, Maguire, David Gilbert, Chris Wakelin, Jak Jones, Dikme, and Ishpreet Singh Chadha all withdrew prior to the main stage, and so their respective opponents (Holt, Ian Burns, Xu Si, Matthew Selt, Artemijs Žižins, Brecel, Xu Yichen, and O'Sullivan) received walkovers to the last 32. David Lilley made successive breaks of 79, 85, 66, and 90 as he took a 4–1 lead over Shaun Murphy, but Murphy won the last four frames for a 5–4 victory. Stuart Bingham produced breaks of 131, 89, and 108 as he beat Anthony McGill by the same scoreline. Zhao Hanyang made breaks of 59, 100, 92, 51, and 68 against Robbie Williams, but Williams won 5–4, despite losing the first three frames and not making a half-century break in the match.

Stan Moody made breaks of 84, 52, 84, and 82 as he took a 4–1 lead over the defending champion Higgins, who was playing in the record-extending 2,000th professional match of his career. Higgins then won three consecutive frames, making a century of 135 in frame seven, as he tied the scores at 4–4. Higgins had the first chance in the decider but scored just 15 points, and Moody secured the frame and match with a break of 65. "When he got in first in the last frame I just thought it was game over," said 19-year-old Moody afterwards. "[Higgins] is a class act. I knew if I let him back in he would come back, so I'm glad I managed to hold my nerve in the decider." He added: "I watched [Higgins] growing up and learning the game. To beat him in an important match out in China, and to do it with a lot of breaks as well, is a good feeling."

Kyren Wilson made a highest break of 115 in a 5–2 victory over Lyu Haotian, and Trump made two centuries of 116 and 101 during his 5–1 win over Florian Nüßle. Afterwards, Trump spoke about having to leave his home in Dubai due to the 2026 Iran war and described how he had prepared for the tournament in Thailand. "I had to leave so we went to Bangkok," he said. "It is a bit up in the air at the moment. I don't think I can go back there right now in case I get stuck. I am looking for somewhere to live. It is just day by day. My brother was stuck in Dubai for a bit, which wasn't ideal, but thankfully he has got out now. I hope things turn around. I managed to practice in Thailand and dedicate myself as usual." Zhao Xintong made breaks of 95, 92, 93, 139, and 129 against Long Zehuang, winning the match in a deciding frame. Gary Wilson trailed Aaron Hill 3–4 but took frame eight on a re-spotted black and went on to win the decider. Mark Williams advanced with a 5–2 victory over Walden.

==== Last 32 ====
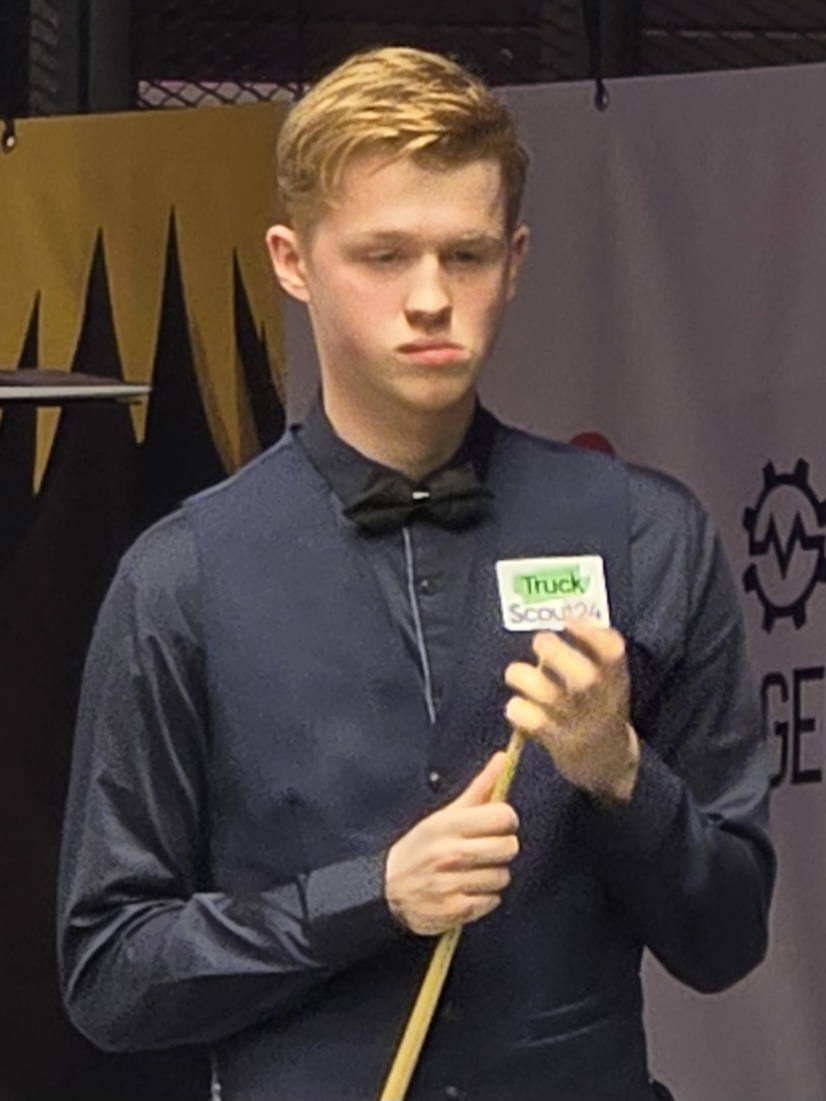
Artemijs Žižins (pictured in 2025) defeated Luca Brecel 5–1 to reach the last 16 of a ranking event for the first time.

O'Sullivan produced breaks including 77, 138, 96, and 52 as he whitewashed Selt. "I always prepare well," he said afterwards. "I know people question if I practise enough. Everyone has done that since I was a kid. They seem to think I just turn up. I prepare harder than probably any other player and I work harder. I think people just assume I only need to get out of bed and pot balls. That isn't the case. I work very hard." Murphy lost the first frame against Xu Si but then made breaks including 84, 117, 61, and 59 as he took a 4–1 lead. In frame six, Murphy attempted a maximum break, potting 15 reds and 15 blacks before missing the yellow, ending the break on 120. He won the match 5–1. Of his failed maximum attempt, he said afterwards: "I just lost my composure, I think. I was a bit excited. I made a 147 here last year. It would have been a great moment. I played a lot of great shots to keep getting on the black and then when I had them on a plate I lost my brain. It isn't as easy as some people make it look."

The world number 17 Bingham lost in a deciding frame to Wu, which ended his chances of becoming a top-16 seed at the 2026 World Championship. Allen beat the world number 18 Lisowski 5–1, meaning that Lisowski also did not qualify automatically for the Crucible. Kyren Wilson defeated Allan Taylor, Zhao made two centuries of 100 and 118 as he beat Sam Craigie, and Thepchaiya Un-Nooh also made two centuries of 110 and 121 as he defeated Holt, all by 5–1 scorelines. Trump made back-to-back centuries of 118 and 101 as he beat Jackson Page 5–2, and Fu defeated Martin O'Donnell by the same score, reaching the last 16 of a ranking tournament for the first time in over two years. Artemijs Žižins, aged 19, defeated Brecel 5–1 to reach the last 16 of a ranking event for the first time in his career. Hossein Vafaei lost the first two frames against Mark Williams but then won five in a row, making a century of 127 on his way to a 5–2 victory. Zhang Anda beat Xiao Guodong by the same score, and Robbie Williams advanced by defeating Wells in a deciding frame.

==== Last 16 ====
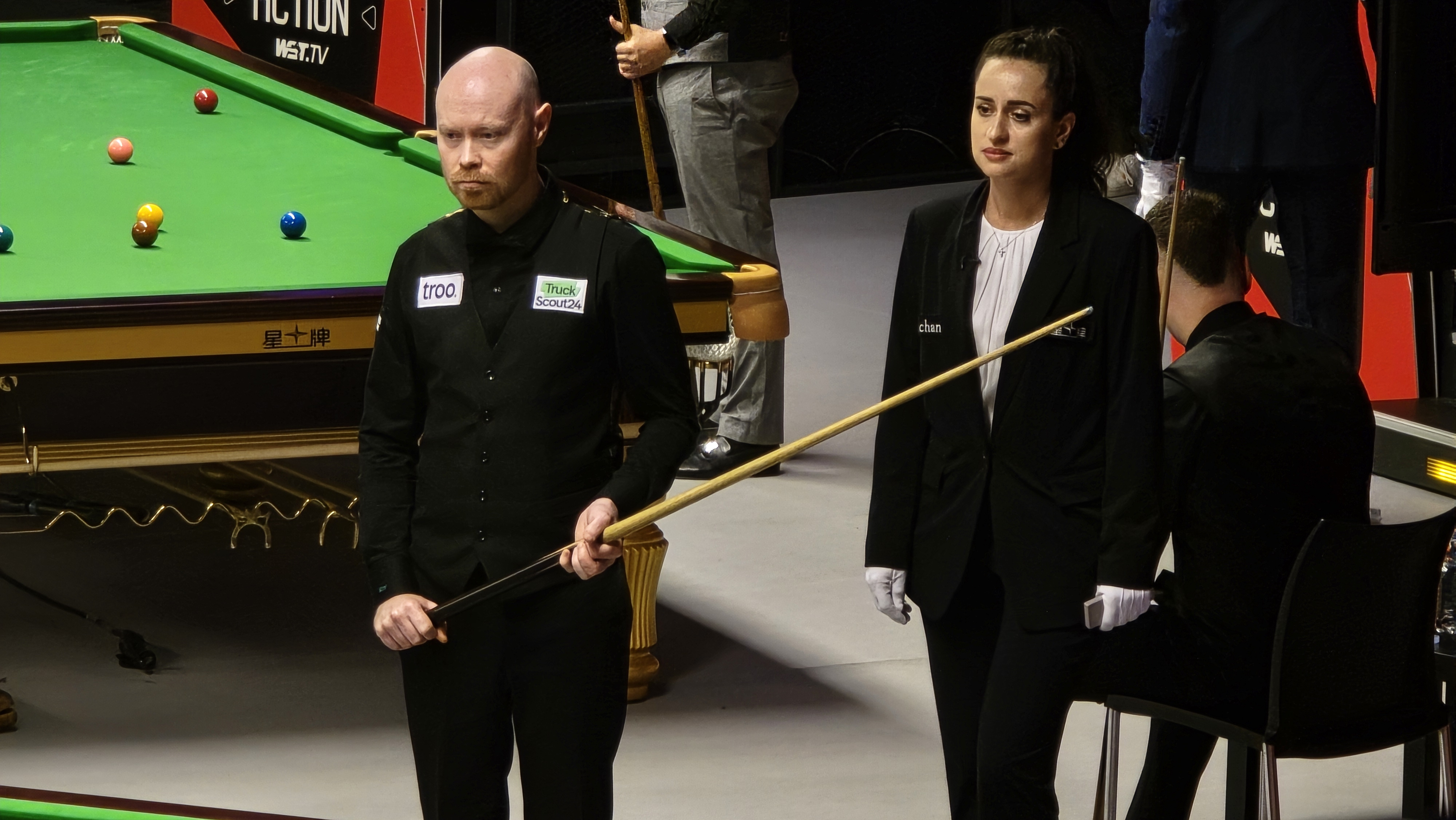
Gary Wilson (pictured in 2025) made three century breaks as he defeated the reigning World Champion Zhao Xintong.

Murphy won two of the first three frames against O'Sullivan, making a century of 139 in frame two, but O'Sullivan took four of the next five, making breaks including 70, 121, 89, and 76 as he secured a 5–3 victory, his 15th win over Murphy in their 19 professional meetings. O'Sullivan advanced to the 150th ranking quarter-final of his career, his first since the 2025 Saudi Arabia Snooker Masters the previous August. "[Murphy] has been playing unbelievably," O'Sullivan said afterwards. "He has been so strong. I was happy when I got to 2–2. I thought at least I've been involved in a game against a top-quality player. To win is even better." He added: "For me, just going out there and playing is a victory. Whether I win or lose is irrelevant. For me to be able to go out there and not feel scared is a victory." Allen secured his place in the 2026 Tour Championship as he whitewashed Zhou Yuelong, making a highest break of 129. Afterwards, Allen described taking a more aggressive approach in tournament play. "I want to try to score heavier, but you can't force it," Allen said afterwards. "I feel that the last few tournaments I have been taking more on. That is down to confidence. I am forcing myself to do that in practice."

Gary Wilson made breaks including 104, 84, 107, and 100 as he beat the reigning World Champion Zhao 5–2. "I'm happy to get the win," he said afterwards. "This was a big game. I didn't think about it being [Zhao] in China. These days I'm just playing every game the same. You can feel a bit flat because of that, but I was cueing well today and getting chances." Ryan Day defeated Žižins in a deciding frame, reaching his first ranking quarter-final in over two years. Wu lost the first two frames against Kyren Wilson but then made breaks including 80, 60, 109, and 67 as he won five in a row for a 5–2 victory. The result meant that Kyren Wilson remained outside the top 12 on the one-year ranking list and did not qualify for the Tour Championship. Trump and Robbie Williams were tied at 2–2 at the mid-session interval, but Trump then won three consecutive frames with breaks of 106, 77, and 94 for a 5–2 victory. Un-Nooh defeated Fu by the same score, and Vafaei edged out Zhang, winning the match on the last black of the deciding frame.

==== Quarter-finals ====
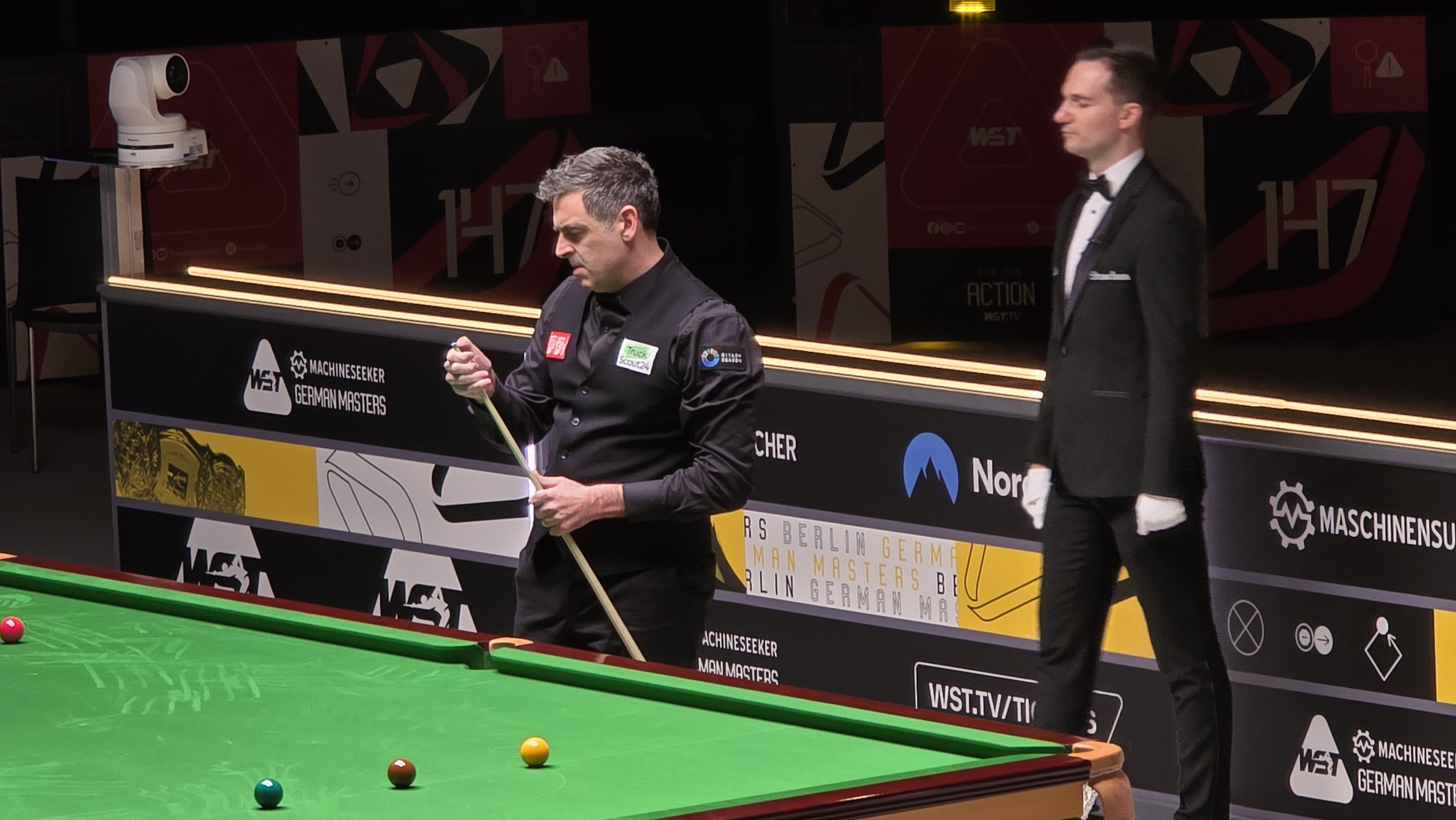
Ronnie O'Sullivan (pictured in 2026) made the highest break in professional snooker history, a 16-red clearance of 153.

In the first frame of his quarter-final match against Day, O'Sullivan made the highest break in professional snooker history, a 16-red clearance of 153. Awarded a free ball after Day failed to escape from a snooker, O'Sullivan potted the green as his nominated free ball, followed by the black. He went on to pot all 15 reds, 13 further blacks, two pinks, and all the colours. It was only the second time that a break exceeding 147 had been made in professional competition, following the 148 by Jamie Burnett in the qualifying rounds of the 2004 UK Championship. O'Sullivan made additional breaks of 62, 110, 103, and 95 as he completed a whitewash victory. Day scored only 38 points in the match. "It was a great buzz," O'Sullivan said afterwards. "I could have tried to get the extra black, but I just thought nobody had made a break bigger than 147 on TV so I wanted to be the first. I've been the first of many things so I thought I might as well get that one as well. I feel blessed to achieve these things." He added: "I've never made anything more than a 147 [even in practice]. For me, if the excitement and the buzz is there, I can do great things. Unless there is something at the end of it, I don't. I hadn't made a 147 for years, but I realised that I hadn't made two in one tournament before, so I went for it [at the Saudi Arabia Snooker Masters]." For the first time in professional snooker history, a highest break prize was awarded for a break greater than 147.

In the other quarter-finals, Wu made breaks of 83, 140, 77, 109, and 53 as he defeated Allen 5–1. "Today I felt really good," he said. "When I got down on the shot, I felt very confident. When I can find that form, I know I'm capable of producing some very high-quality snooker. I did prepare mentally for this match. [Allen] is a tough opponent and can drag you into his rhythm, but I felt ready for that today." Trump produced breaks of 88, 109, and 113 as he beat Vafaei, also by a 5–1 scoreline. "It has been a good six months," he commented afterwards. "Since getting to the final of [the 2025 Northern Ireland Open], everything has been very consistent. I feel back to somewhere near my best. I think the only thing I'd have done differently is win a few deciding frames. That could have been the difference for having an unbelievable season." Un-Nooh defeated Gary Wilson, again by a 5–1 scoreline, which meant that Wilson did not qualify for the Tour Championship and was not among the top 16 seeds at the World Championship.

==== Semi-finals ====
Facing Wu, whom he had defeated 5–1 in their only previous encounter at the 2022 European Masters, O'Sullivan made breaks including 86 and 78 as he took a 3–1 lead at the mid-session interval. Wu won frame five and then took frame six on the last black, potting it along the top cushion to tie the scores at 3–3. O'Sullivan won frame seven with a 97 break, but Wu took frame eight with a break of 86. O'Sullivan moved ahead with a century of 118 in frame nine, but Wu produced a 77 break in frame 10 to tie the scores again at 5–5. In the deciding frame, Wu made a 43 break before playing a safety shot. O'Sullivan potted a red to the yellow pocket and went on to make a match-winning break of 89. "I like my bottle when I'm flowing," O'Sullivan said afterwards. "I like my bottle anyway, really. At 5–5 when he missed, I had a chance on the red. I had to go for it. The ball went in, which I couldn't believe, and I made a great clearance." O'Sullivan complimented his less experienced opponent, saying: "His cue power and snooker brain is great. He has a lot to learn, but it is the easy bits he needs to learn. He's like me before I met Ray Reardon. He can pot balls and score really well. I'm telling him he needs to learn the other side of the game."

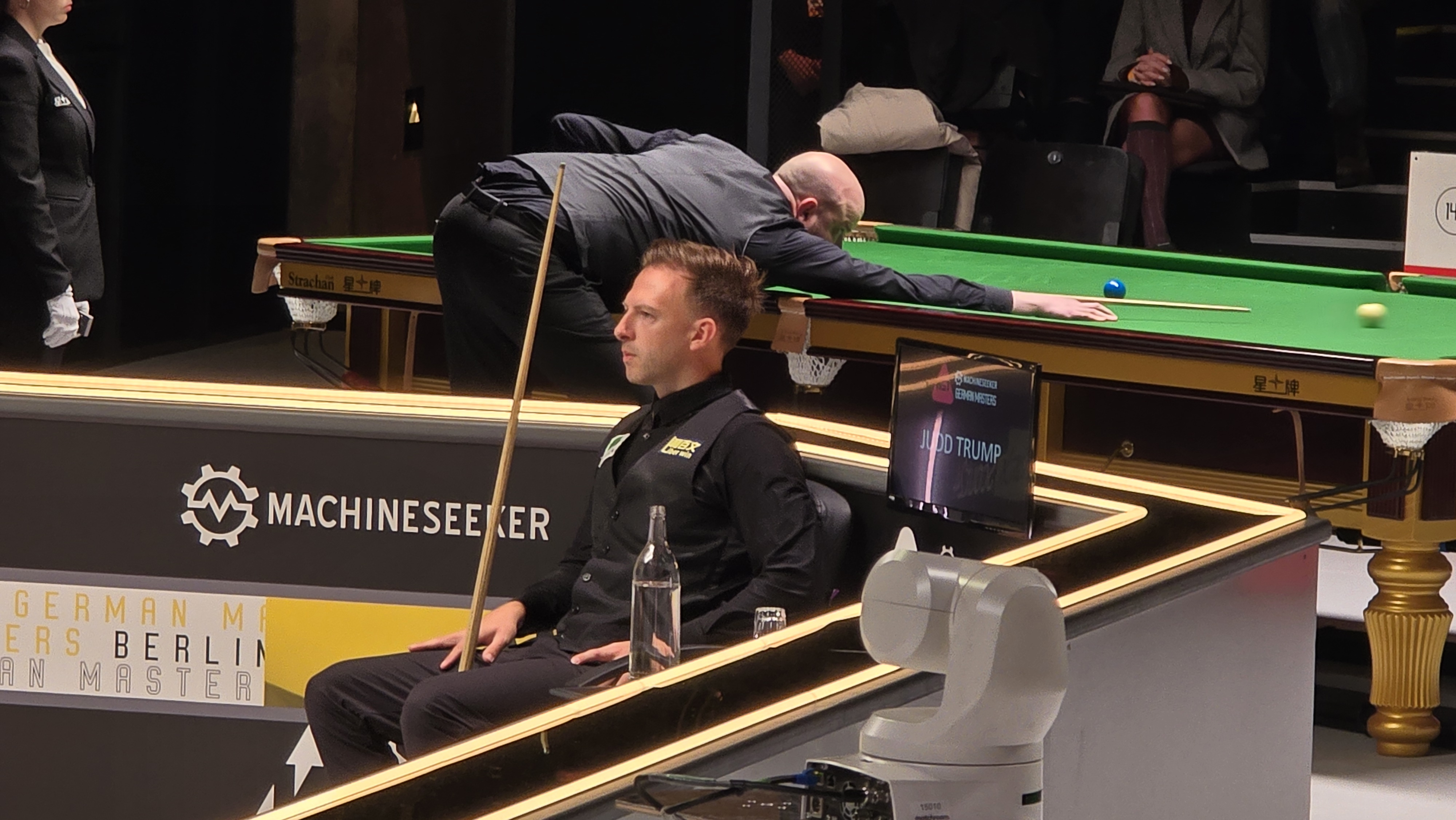
The world number one Judd Trump (pictured in 2026) reached the semi-finals but lost 4–6 to Thepchaiya Un-Nooh.

In the second semi-final, the world number one Trump faced Un-Nooh, who was playing in his first ranking semi-final since the 2022 Scottish Open. Trump won the opening frame despite having required four snookers, but Un-Nooh took frame two. Trump made an 89 break to win frame three, but Un-Nooh took frame four on the last black to tie the scores at 2–2 at the mid-session interval. When play resumed, Un-Nooh made three century breaks in five frames, 128, 134, and 134, and moved 5–4 ahead. Frame 10 came down to a tactical exchange on the last two balls after Un-Nooh missed a pot on the pink. Trump successfully doubled the pink but failed to gain position on the black. He missed an attempted double on the black to a middle pocket, and Un-Nooh made a long pot on the black to win the match 6–4. "When I missed the pink I had goosebumps," Un-Nooh said afterwards. "I was in shock. Wow. How did I miss that? I got lucky not to leave him on the black and I was able to pot it to the left corner. It was a good shot in the end. I didn't want to play safe on the black. I just thought, come on, go for it. I wanted to play with confidence. I didn't want to play safe with him as he is a really good safety player."

==== Final ====
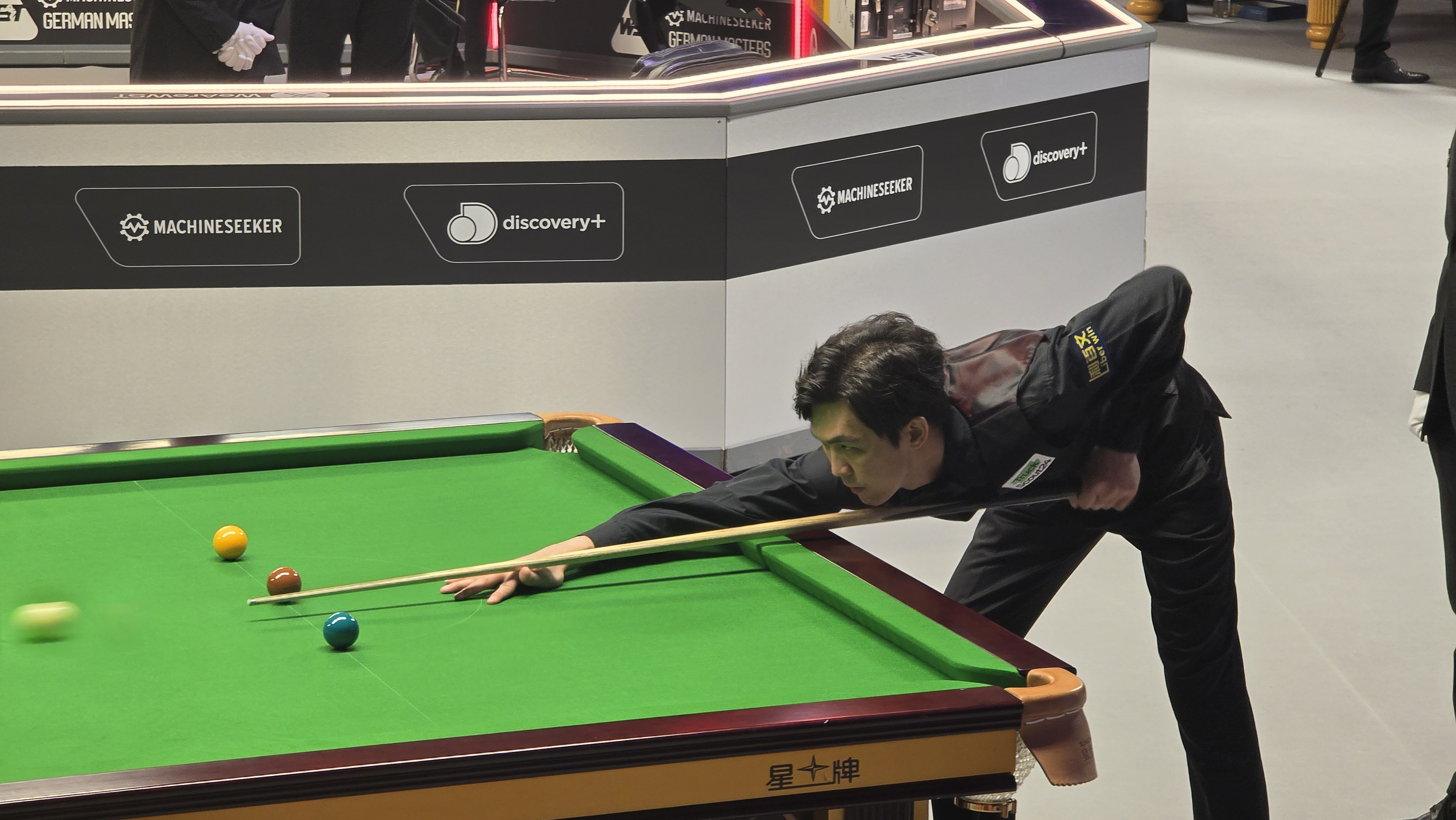
Thepchaiya Un-Nooh (pictured in 2025) defeated Ronnie O'Sullivan 10–7 in the final to win his second ranking title. Un-Nooh made a maximum break, the seventh of his career, in the penultimate frame.

The final took place on 22 March as the best of 19 frames, played over two sessions, between the 11th seed O'Sullivan and the 41st seed Un-Nooh. O'Sullivan played in his 66th ranking final, while Un-Nooh contested his third. Un-Nooh had previously been runner-up at the 2019 edition of the tournament, when he lost 5–10 to Trump.

In the first session, O'Sullivan made breaks including 73 and 124 as he won the first four frames, but Un-Nooh responded with breaks including 83 and 82 as he took the next five, ending the session 5–4 ahead. When play resumed for the second session, Un-Nooh made a clearance of 50 to win frame 10 on the last black, but O'Sullivan produced three consecutive century breaks of 114, 102, and 136 as he moved into a 7–6 lead at the mid-session interval. Un-Nooh made breaks of 77 and 132 as he regained the lead at 8–7. In frame 16, Un-Nooh compiled a maximum break, his seventh in professional competition and his third of the season. It was the 240th official maximum break in snooker history and the record-extending 23rd maximum of the season. Un-Nooh completed a 10–7 victory with a third consecutive total clearance of 131, meaning that the last seven frames of the final had produced six century breaks. Un-Nooh won his first World Open title and the second ranking title of his career, following his previous ranking victory at the 2019 Snooker Shoot Out. He became the second Thai player, after James Wattana at the 1995 Thailand Open, to win a full-format ranking tournament. The £175,000 winner's prize, the largest of his career, secured him a place in the Tour Championship and advanced him from 39th to 22nd in the snooker world rankings.

"This has always been my dream, to lift the title against Ronnie O'Sullivan in the final," Un-Nooh said afterwards. "For the rest of my life, this is something I'm not going to forget." He added: "I went to the practice room in the interval, spoke to myself and managed my emotions. After being sat on my chair watching Ronnie make three centuries, I told myself this is a great final and to enjoy it. I don't know how what happened after the interval came true. I can't believe it. I'm still stunned with my performance. How did I do that? Sometimes snooker is one-way traffic. To make a 147 in the final against Ronnie O'Sullivan is a great honour." O'Sullivan, who scored only six points in the last four frames, commented: "It has been a positive week, but I have to say Thepchaiya [Un-Nooh] was unbelievable. He deserved his victory. He played much better than me today. I watched his semi-final and he was strong. I couldn't go with that. It was far too good for me."

== Main draw ==
The results of the main draw are shown below. Numbers in parentheses after the players' names denote the top 32 seeds, and players in bold denote match winners. An "(a)" indicates amateur players not on the World Snooker Tour.

=== Top half ===
**Last 64**; Best of 9 frames
John Higgins (SCO) (1)	4
**Stan Moody (ENG)**	**5**
Lei Peifan (CHN) (29)	1
**Ryan Day (WAL)**	**5**
Chris Wakelin (ENG) (15) (Note: Chris Wakelin withdrew and so Artemijs Žižins was given a walkover to the last 32.)	w/d
**Artemijs Žižins** (LVA)	**w/o**
Jak Jones (WAL) (19) (Note: Jak Jones withdrew and so Luca Brecel was given a walkover to the last 32.)	w/d
**Luca Brecel** (BEL)	**w/o**
**Matthew Selt** (ENG)	**w/o**
David Gilbert (ENG) (24) (Note: David Gilbert withdrew and so Matthew Selt was given a walkover to the last 32.)	w/d
Ishpreet Singh Chadha (IND) (Note: Ishpreet Singh Chadha withdrew and so Ronnie O'Sullivan was given a walkover to the last 32.)	w/d
**Ronnie O'Sullivan** (ENG) (11)	**w/o**
**Xu Si** (CHN)	**w/o**
Stephen Maguire (SCO) (25) (Note: Stephen Maguire withdrew and so Xu Si was given a walkover to the last 32.)	w/d
David Lilley (ENG)	4
**Shaun Murphy (ENG) (8)**	**5**
Umut Dikme (GER) (a) (Note: Umut Dikme replaced Neil Robertson in the qualifying draw but then withdrew himself before the start of the main stage and so Xu Yichen was given a walkover to the last 32.)	w/d
**Xu Yichen** (CHN)	**w/o**
**Zhou Yuelong (CHN) (30)**	**5**
He Guoqiang (CHN)	3
**Mark Allen (NIR) (9)**	**5**
Antoni Kowalski (POL)	2
**Jack Lisowski (ENG) (22)**	**5**
Cheung Ka Wai (HKG)	1
Anthony McGill (SCO)	4
**Stuart Bingham (ENG) (17)**	**5**
Chang Bingyu (CHN)	3
**Wu Yize (CHN) (13)**	**5**
Zak Surety (ENG)	2
**Allan Taylor (ENG)**	**5**
Lyu Haotian (CHN)	2
**Kyren Wilson (ENG) (4)**	**5**

**Last 32**; Best of 9 frames
(England) Stan Moody	2
**(Wales) Ryan Day**	**5**
**(Latvia) Artemijs Žižins**	**5**
(Belgium) Luca Brecel	1
(England) Matthew Selt	0
**(England) Ronnie O'Sullivan (11)**	**5**
(China) Xu Si	1
**(England) Shaun Murphy (8)**	**5**
(China) Xu Yichen	1
**(China) Zhou Yuelong (30)**	**5**
**(Northern Ireland) Mark Allen (9)**	**5**
(England) Jack Lisowski (22)	1
(England) Stuart Bingham (17)	4
**(China) Wu Yize (13)**	**5**
(England) Allan Taylor	1
**(England) Kyren Wilson (4)**	**5**

**Last 16**; Best of 9 frames
**(Wales) Ryan Day**	**5**
(Latvia) Artemijs Žižins	4
**(England) Ronnie O'Sullivan (11)**	**5**
(England) Shaun Murphy (8)	3
(China) Zhou Yuelong (30)	0
**(Northern Ireland) Mark Allen (9)**	**5**
**(China) Wu Yize (13)**	**5**
(England) Kyren Wilson (4)	2

**Quarter-finals**; Best of 9 frames
(Wales) Ryan Day	0
**(England) Ronnie O'Sullivan (11)**	**5**
(Northern Ireland) Mark Allen (9)	1
**(China) Wu Yize (13)**	**5**

**Semi-finals**; Best of 11 frames
**(England) Ronnie O'Sullivan (11)**	**6**
(China) Wu Yize (13)	5

Note: w/d=withdrawn; w/o=walkover

=== Bottom half ===
**Last 64**; Best of 9 frames
**Judd Trump (ENG) (3)**	**5**
Florian Nüßle (AUT)	1
Liu Wenwei (CHN)	2
**Jackson Page (WAL)**	**5**
Zhao Hanyang (CHN)	4
**Robbie Williams (ENG)**	**5**
Elliot Slessor (ENG) (21)	0
**Daniel Wells (WAL)**	**5**
Steven Hallworth (ENG)	1
**Zhang Anda (CHN) (23)**	**5**
Julien Leclercq (BEL)	2
**Xiao Guodong (CHN) (10)**	**5**
Matthew Stevens (WAL)	1
**Hossein Vafaei (IRN) (32)**	**5**
Ricky Walden (ENG)	2
**Mark Williams (WAL) (6)**	**5**
Mark Selby (ENG) (7) (Note: Mark Selby withdrew and so Michael Holt was given a walkover to the last 32.)	w/d
**Michael Holt** (ENG)	**w/o**
David Grace (ENG)	1
**Thepchaiya Un-Nooh (THA)**	**5**
**Marco Fu (HKG)**	**5**
Iulian Boiko (UKR)	3
Ali Carter (ENG) (20)	3
**Martin O'Donnell (ENG)**	**5**
Aaron Hill (IRL)	4
**Gary Wilson (ENG) (18)**	**5**
**Ian Burns** (ENG)	**w/o**
Barry Hawkins (ENG) (14) (Note: Barry Hawkins withdrew and so Ian Burns was given a walkover to the last 32.)	w/d
Yao Pengcheng (CHN)	3
**Sam Craigie (ENG)**	**5**
Long Zehuang (CHN)	4
**Zhao Xintong (CHN) (2)**	**5**

**Last 32**; Best of 9 frames
**(England) Judd Trump (3)**	**5**
(Wales) Jackson Page	2
**(England) Robbie Williams**	**5**
(Wales) Daniel Wells	4
**(China) Zhang Anda (23)**	**5**
(China) Xiao Guodong (10)	2
**(Iran) Hossein Vafaei (32)**	**5**
(Wales) Mark Williams (6)	2
(England) Michael Holt	1
**(Thailand) Thepchaiya Un-Nooh**	**5**
**(Hong Kong) Marco Fu**	**5**
(England) Martin O'Donnell	3
**(England) Gary Wilson (18)**	**5**
(England) Ian Burns	1
(England) Sam Craigie	1
**(China) Zhao Xintong (2)**	**5**

**Last 16**; Best of 9 frames
**(England) Judd Trump (3)**	**5**
(England) Robbie Williams	2
(China) Zhang Anda (23)	4
**(Iran) Hossein Vafaei (32)**	**5**
**(Thailand) Thepchaiya Un-Nooh**	**5**
(Hong Kong) Marco Fu	2
**(England) Gary Wilson (18)**	**5**
(China) Zhao Xintong (2)	2

**Quarter-finals**; Best of 9 frames
**(England) Judd Trump (3)**	**5**
(Iran) Hossein Vafaei (32)	1
**(Thailand) Thepchaiya Un-Nooh**	**5**
(England) Gary Wilson (18)	1

**Semi-finals**; Best of 11 frames
(England) Judd Trump (3)	4
**(Thailand) Thepchaiya Un-Nooh**	**6**

Note: w/d=withdrawn; w/o=walkover

=== Final: frame scores ===
Final: Best of 19 frames. Referee: Zhang Tao; Yushan Sport Centre, Yushan, China, 22 March 2026
Ronnie O'Sullivan (11); England	7–**10**	**Thepchaiya Un-Nooh**; Thailand
Afternoon: **78**–0, **70**–40, **129**–0 (124), **65**–56, 6–**83**, 1–**77**, 52–**66**, 1–**82**, 6–**128**; Evening: 55–**60**, **114**–12 (114), **116**–17 (102), **136**–0 (136), 6–**119**, 0–**132** (132), 0–**147** (147), 0–**131** (131)
(frame 13) 136	Highest break	**147** (frame 16)
**4**	Century breaks	3

== Qualifying ==
Qualifiers were held from 10 to 12 February 2026 at the Barnsley Metrodome in Barnsley, England. Qualifying matches involving the defending champion John Higgins, the reigning World Champion Zhao Xintong, the world number one Judd Trump, the seven-time World Champion Ronnie O'Sullivan, the next two highest-ranked Chinese players (Xiao Guodong and Zhang Anda), and four Chinese wildcards (Han Fuyuan, Xu Jiarui, Wang Xinbo, and Liu Yang) were held over to be played at the main venue in Yushan. Numbers in parentheses after the players' names denote the players' seeding, and players in bold denote match winners. An "(a)" indicates amateur players not on the World Snooker Tour.

=== Pre-qualifying ===
The following match was a pre-qualifier and was played at the main venue in Yushan:

- Mitchell Mann (ENG) (80) 0–**5** **Wang Xinbo** (CHN) (a)

=== Held-over matches ===
The results of the qualifying matches played at the main venue in Yushan are as follows:

- **John Higgins** (SCO) (1) **5**–3 Liam Highfield (ENG) (89)
- **Zhao Xintong** (CHN) (2) **5**–0 Han Fuyuan (CHN) (a)
- **Judd Trump** (ENG) (3) **5**–1 Mark Lloyd (ENG) (a) (Note: Mark Lloyd replaced Chris Totten, who withdrew.)
- **Xiao Guodong** (CHN) (10) **5**–3 Ben Mertens (BEL) (67)
- **Ronnie O'Sullivan** (ENG) (11) **5**–1 Ross Muir (SCO) (105)
- **Zhang Anda** (CHN) (23) **5**–3 Xu Jiarui (CHN) (a)
- **Jackson Page** (WAL) (34) **5**–3 Liu Yang (CHN) (a)
- **Ricky Walden** (ENG) (49) **5**–2 Wang Xinbo (CHN) (a)

=== Qualifying round ===
The results of the qualifying matches played in Barnsley are as follows:

- **Kyren Wilson** (ENG) (4) **5**–0 Alexander Ursenbacher (SUI) (115)
- **Umut Dikme** (GER) (a) **5**–4 Oliver Brown (ENG) (116) (Note: Umut Dikme replaced Neil Robertson, who withdrew.)
- **Mark Williams** (WAL) (6) **5**–0 Kreishh Gurbaxani (IND) (120)
- **Mark Selby** (ENG) (7) **5**–4 Haydon Pinhey (ENG) (90)
- **Shaun Murphy** (ENG) (8) **5**–3 Chatchapong Nasa (THA) (112)
- **Mark Allen** (NIR) (9) **5**–2 Louis Heathcote (ENG) (72)
- Ding Junhui (CHN) (12) 2–**5** **Marco Fu** (HKG) (92)
- **Wu Yize** (CHN) (13) **5**–2 Liam Pullen (ENG) (82)
- **Barry Hawkins** (ENG) (14) **5**–3 Duane Jones (WAL) (70)
- **Chris Wakelin** (ENG) (15) **5**–1 Mink Nutcharut (THA) (118)
- Si Jiahui (CHN) (16) 3–**5** **Zhao Hanyang** (CHN) (107)
- **Stuart Bingham** (ENG) (17) **5**–0 Ng On-yee (HKG) (119)
- **Gary Wilson** (ENG) (18) **5**–1 Farakh Ajaib (PAK) (78)
- **Jak Jones** (WAL) (19) **5**–1 Sahil Nayyar (CAN) (123)
- **Ali Carter** (ENG) (20) **5**–2 Jimmy White (ENG) (121)
- **Elliot Slessor** (ENG) (21) **5**–2 Bai Yulu (CHN) (102)
- **Jack Lisowski** (ENG) (22) **5**–2 Gong Chenzhi (CHN) (69)
- **David Gilbert** (ENG) (24) **5**–3 Connor Benzey (ENG) (117)
- **Stephen Maguire** (SCO) (25) **5**–1 Sanderson Lam (ENG) (66)
- Joe O'Connor (ENG) (26) 3–**5** **Liu Wenwei** (CHN) (108)
- Pang Junxu (CHN) (27) 4–**5** **Sam Craigie** (ENG) (87)
- Tom Ford (ENG) (28) 4–**5** **Allan Taylor** (ENG) (73)
- **Lei Peifan** (CHN) (29) **5**–0 Michał Szubarczyk (POL) (96)
- **Zhou Yuelong** (CHN) (30) **5**–0 Dylan Emery (WAL) (93)
- Yuan Sijun (CHN) (31) 2–**5** **David Grace** (ENG) (94)
- **Hossein Vafaei** (IRN) (32) **5**–2 Lan Yuhao (CHN) (95)
- Jimmy Robertson (ENG) (33) 3–**5** **Cheung Ka Wai** (HKG) (83)
- **Ryan Day** (WAL) (35) **5**–3 Jordan Brown (NIR) (65)
- Ben Woollaston (ENG) (36) 3–**5** **Yao Pengcheng** (CHN) (103)
- **Matthew Selt** (ENG) (37) **5**–4 Liam Davies (WAL) (76)
- **Xu Si** (CHN) (38) **5**–1 Mahmoud El Hareedy (EGY) (125)
- **Daniel Wells** (WAL) (39) **5**–4 Robbie McGuigan (NIR) (86)
- Noppon Saengkham (THA) (40) 3–**5** **Steven Hallworth** (ENG) (91)
- **Thepchaiya Un-Nooh** (THA) (41) **5**–0 Mohammed Shehab (UAE) (114)
- **Aaron Hill** (IRL) (42) **5**–0 Haris Tahir (PAK) (88)
- **Luca Brecel** (BEL) (43) **5**–4 Mateusz Baranowski (POL) (106)
- **He Guoqiang** (CHN) (44) **5**–4 Amir Sarkhosh (IRN) (77)
- **Anthony McGill** (SCO) (45) **5**–3 Leone Crowley (IRL) (113)
- **Zak Surety** (ENG) (46) **5**–1 Huang Jiahao (CHN) (84)
- **Martin O'Donnell** (ENG) (47) **5**–1 Jonas Luz (BRA) (111)
- **Matthew Stevens** (WAL) (48) **5**–1 Fergal Quinn (NIR) (122)
- **Stan Moody** (ENG) (50) **5**–4 Jiang Jun (CHN) (79)
- Scott Donaldson (SCO) (51) 4–**5** **Xu Yichen** (CHN) (109)
- **Long Zehuang** (CHN) (52) **5**–2 Liam Graham (SCO) (104)
- **David Lilley** (ENG) (53) **5**–0 Reanne Evans (ENG) (101)
- **Lyu Haotian** (CHN) (54) **5**–3 Gao Yang (CHN) (100)
- **Robbie Williams** (ENG) (55) **5**–3 Wang Yuchen (HKG) (68)
- Fan Zhengyi (CHN) (56) 2–**5** **Julien Leclercq** (BEL) (74)
- Robert Milkins (ENG) (57) 3–**5** **Iulian Boiko** (UKR) (81)
- Oliver Lines (ENG) (58) 3–**5** **Florian Nüßle** (AUT) (124)
- Liu Hongyu (CHN) (59) 4–**5** **Antoni Kowalski** (POL) (71)
- **Michael Holt** (ENG) (60) **5**–2 Ken Doherty (IRL) (99)
- Jamie Jones (WAL) (61) 0–**5** **Artemijs Žižins** (LVA) (75)
- **Chang Bingyu** (CHN) (62) **5**–0 Hatem Yassen (EGY) (110)
- **Ishpreet Singh Chadha** (IND) (63) **5**–2 Bulcsú Révész (HUN) (85)
- Mark Davis (ENG) (64) 1–**5** **Ian Burns** (ENG) (97)

== Century breaks ==
=== Main stage centuries ===
A total of 87 century breaks were made during the main stage of the tournament in Yushan.

- 153, 138, 136, 124, 121, 118, 114, 114, 113, 110, 103, 102 – Ronnie O'Sullivan
- 147, 134, 134, 134, 132, 131, 128, 121, 110, 108 – Thepchaiya Un-Nooh
- 141 – Wang Xinbo
- 140, 109, 109, 102 – Wu Yize
- 139, 129, 128, 118, 103, 100 – Zhao Xintong
- 139, 120, 117 – Shaun Murphy
- 138, 137 – Zhang Anda
- 138 – Zhou Yuelong
- 136, 108 – Jackson Page
- 136, 107, 106, 104, 100 – Gary Wilson
- 136 – Robbie Williams
- 135, 102 – John Higgins
- 133 – Martin O'Donnell
- 132 – Julien Leclercq
- 131, 111, 108 – Stuart Bingham
- 131, 104 – Liam Highfield
- 129, 122 – Mark Allen
- 129, 118, 116, 113, 109, 106, 101, 101 – Judd Trump
- 128 – Antoni Kowalski
- 127, 125, 105, 103, 100 – Xiao Guodong
- 127 – Hossein Vafaei
- 118, 102 – Ricky Walden
- 118 – Iulian Boiko
- 116 – Aaron Hill
- 115, 112, 101 – Kyren Wilson
- 112 – He Guoqiang
- 107 – Marco Fu
- 107 – Yao Pengcheng
- 105 – Jack Lisowski
- 104 – Artemijs Žižins
- 102 – Ryan Day
- 100 – Zhao Hanyang

=== Qualifying stage centuries ===
A total of 32 century breaks were made during the qualifying stage of the tournament in Barnsley.

- 141, 114 – Gao Yang
- 141 – Scott Donaldson
- 140 – Stephen Maguire
- 137 – Haydon Pinhey
- 135 – Robbie Williams
- 134 – Tom Ford
- 132 – Jak Jones
- 131 – Wu Yize
- 126 – Jiang Jun
- 126 – Julien Leclercq
- 124, 108 – Mark Allen
- 123, 108 – Ian Burns
- 121, 117 – Lan Yuhao
- 120 – Anthony McGill
- 118, 102 – Sam Craigie
- 116 – Marco Fu
- 115 – Jack Lisowski
- 115 – Zak Surety
- 115 – Thepchaiya Un-Nooh
- 114 – Liam Pullen
- 113 – Zhou Yuelong
- 107 – Aaron Hill
- 105 – Cheung Ka Wai
- 105 – Fan Zhengyi
- 104 – He Guoqiang
- 103 – Si Jiahui
- 100 – Chang Bingyu
