= Xu Yichen =

Chinese snooker player (born 1986)

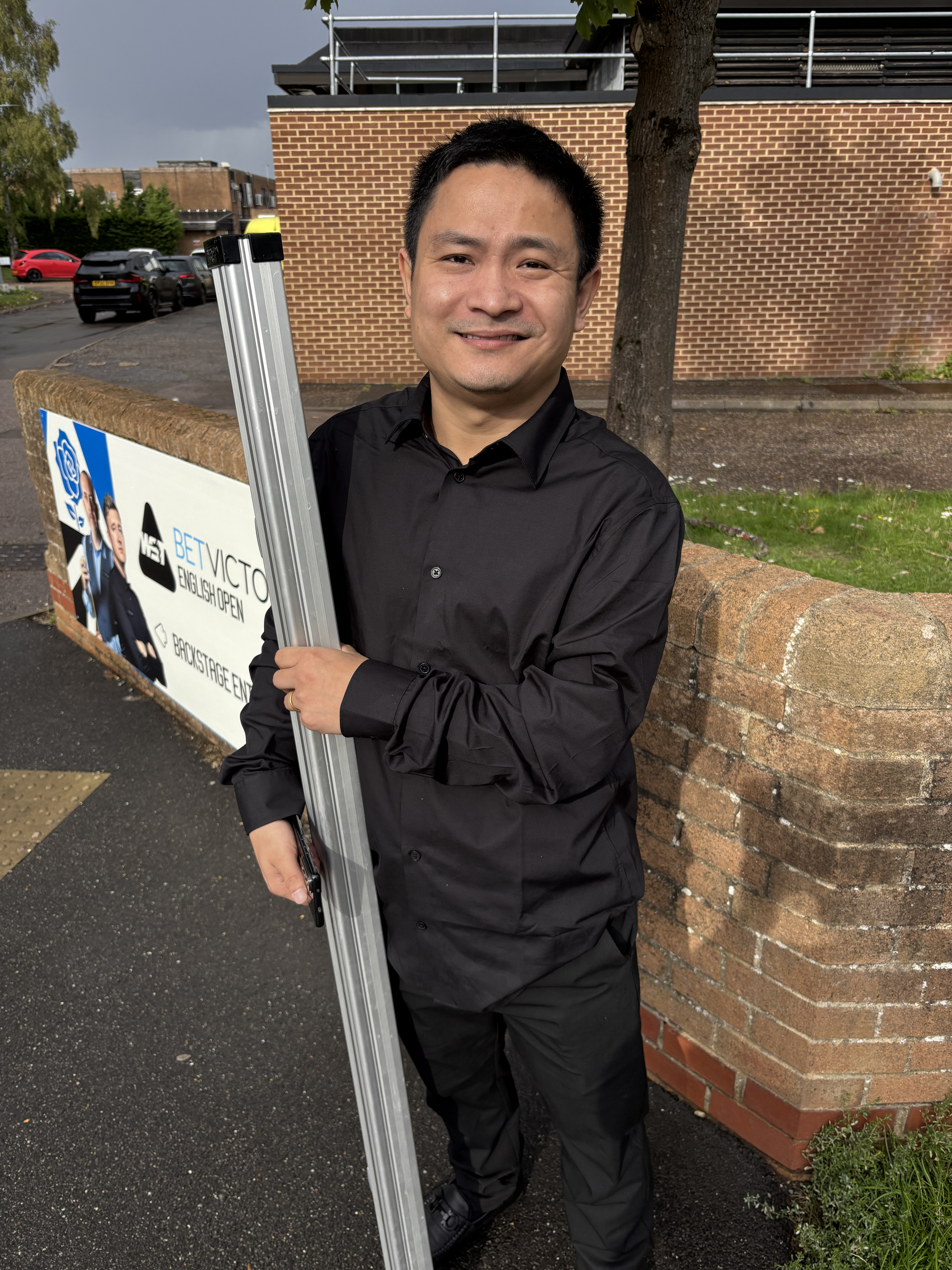
- Xu in 2025

Personal information
- Born: 21 November 1986 (age 39)

Sport
- Country: China
- Sport: Snooker
- Professional: 2025–
- Highest ranking: 80 (July 2026)
- Current ranking: 82 (as of 4 October 2026)

Xu Yichen (born 21 November 1986) is a Chinese snooker player. He won a two year card place on the World Snooker Tour starting from the 2025-26 snooker season.

== Career ==
Xu Yichen is from Changsha, Hunan Province. On September 18, 2016, he won the 2016 National Amateur Snooker Masters. He also won a wildcard into the 2016 Shanghai Masters. At the Shanghai Masters, also in September 2016, he was on the receiving end of a maximum 147 break as he lost 5-0 to Stephen Maguire.

At the Asia Oceania Q School in May 2025 he defeated Thanawat Tirapongpaiboon of Thailand 4-3 and Pakistan's Babar Masih to win a two-year card on the World Snooker Tour. His final round win over Masih was described as dramatic, and was only secured on the final black in the deciding frame. His eligibility is from the 2025-26 snooker season.

=== 2025–26 season ===
He was drawn in the round-robin stage of the 2025 Championship League against Matthew Stevens, Ryan Day and compatriot Lan Yuhao. He reached the last-64 of the 2025 Xi'an Grand Prix in September 2025, with a 5-4 win over Jack Lisowski, recovering a 4-1 deficit. In April, he recorded a 10-4 win over Stuart Carrington in the first round of qualifying for the 2026 World Snooker Championship.

== Performance and rankings timeline ==
Tournament	2016/ 17	2025/ 26	2026/ 27
Ranking (Note: It shows the ranking at the beginning of the season)	(Note: He was an amateur)	(Note: New players on the Main Tour don't have a ranking)	80
Ranking tournaments
Championship League	NR	RR	RR
China Open	A	NH	LQ
Wuhan Open	NH	LQ	LQ
British Open	NH	1R	1R
English Open	A	LQ	LQ
Shenzhen Open (Note: The event was called the Xi'an Grand Prix (2025/2026))	NH	1R	LQ
Northern Ireland Open	A	LQ	LQ
International Championship	A	LQ	LQ
UK Championship	A	LQ	
Shoot Out	A	2R	
Scottish Open	A	LQ	LQ
German Masters	A	LQ	
Welsh Open	A	LQ	
World Grand Prix	DNQ	DNQ	
Players Championship	DNQ	DNQ	
World Open	A	2R	
Tour Championship	NH	DNQ	
World Championship	A	LQ	
Former ranking tournaments
Shanghai Masters	WR	Non-Ranking	
Saudi Arabia Masters	NH	1R	NH

Performance Table Legend
LQ	lost in the qualifying draw	#R	lost in the early rounds of the tournament (WR = Wildcard round, RR = Round robin)	QF	lost in the quarter-finals
SF	lost in the semi-finals	F	lost in the final	W	won the tournament
DNQ	did not qualify for the tournament	A	did not participate in the tournament	WD	withdrew from the tournament

NH / Not Held	means an event was not held.
NR / Non-Ranking Event	means an event is/was no longer a ranking event.
R / Ranking Event	means an event is/was a ranking event.
MR / Minor-Ranking Event	means an event is/was a minor-ranking event.
