= 2025 Xi'an Grand Prix =

Snooker tournament

2025 Du Xiaoman Xi'an Grand Prix

Tournament information
- Dates: 7–13 October 2025
- Venue: Qujiang Sports Complex
- City: Xi'an
- Country: China
- Organisation: World Snooker Tour
- Format: Ranking event
- Total prize fund: £850,000
- Winner's share: £177,000
- Highest break: Zhou Yuelong (CHN) (147); Judd Trump (ENG) (147); Aaron Hill (IRL) (147)

Final
- Champion: Mark Williams (WAL)
- Runner-up: Shaun Murphy (ENG)
- Score: 10–3

The 2025 Xi'an Grand Prix (officially the 2025 Du Xiaoman Xi'an Grand Prix) was a professional snooker tournament that took place from 7 to 13 October 2025 at the Qujiang Sports Complex in Xi'an, China. Qualifying took place from 1 to 3 September at the Leicester Arena in Leicester, England. The second consecutive edition of the tournament since its inaugural staging in 2024, it was the sixth ranking event of the 2025–26 snooker season, following the 2025 British Open and preceding the 2025 Northern Ireland Open. It was broadcast by local channels in China and elsewhere in Asia; by TNT Sports and Discovery+ in the United Kingdom and Ireland; by Eurosport, Discovery+, and HBO Max in mainland Europe; and by WST Play in all other territories. The winner received £177,000 from a total prize fund of £850,000.

Kyren Wilson was the defending champion, having defeated Judd Trump 10–8 in the 2024 final, but he lost 0–5 to Shaun Murphy in the last 16. Mark Williams defeated Murphy 10–3 in the final to win his 27th ranking title. Aged 50 years and 206 days, he became the oldest winner of a ranking event, surpassing Ray Reardon, who had been 50 years and 14 days old when he won the 1982 Professional Players Tournament. Williams became the first player to win professional titles in his teens, 20s, 30s, 40s, and 50s.

The tournament produced 118 century breaks, 25 during the qualifying round in Leicester and 93 at the main stage in Xi'an. Three maximum breaks were made at the event. During the Leicester qualifiers, Zhou Yuelong made the third maximum of his professional career in his 5–2 win over Julien Leclercq. During the held-over qualifiers in Xi'an, Trump made the ninth maximum of his career in his 5–2 win over Ng On-yee. In the second round, Aaron Hill made the second maximum of his career in his 5–2 win over Huang Jiahao. These maximums were respectively the 8th, 12th, and 13th of the season and the 225th, 229th, and 230th in professional snooker history. Trump and Hill both made their maximums on 7 October, marking the fifth occasion that multiple 147s were made on the same day. Ronnie O'Sullivan played his 1,000th match at a ranking event during the held-over qualifiers.

== Overview ==
The Xi'an Grand Prix is a professional ranking snooker tournament held in Xi'an, China. The 2025 edition—the second staging of the tournament—took place from 7 to 13 October at the Qujiang Sports Complex in Xi'an. Qualifying took place from 1 to 3 September at the Leicester Arena in Leicester, England. The tournament was the sixth ranking event of the 2025–26 snooker season, following the 2025 British Open and preceding the 2025 Northern Ireland Open. Kyren Wilson was the defending champion, having defeated Judd Trump 10–8 in the final of the inaugural 2024 edition.

=== Format ===
All matches up to and including the quarter‑finals were the best of 9 frames. The semi‑finals were the best of 11 frames, and the final was the best of 19 frames, held over two sessions.

Marco Fu won his qualifying match in Leicester but withdrew from the tournament's main stage after suffering a fractured elbow. His withdrawal meant that the defending champion Kyren Wilson received a bye to the last 32. Scott Donaldson and Jamie Jones also withdrew from the main stage, and their respective last-64 opponents Mark Williams and Yuan Sijun also received byes to the last 32.

=== Broadcasters ===
The qualifying round was broadcast in mainland China by the CBSA‑WPBSA Academy WeChat Channel, the CBSA‑WPBSA Academy Douyin, Huya Live and Migu. It was broadcast in the United Kingdom, Germany, Italy, and Austria by Discovery+ and in other European territories by HBO Max. In all other territories, it was streamed by WST Play.

In mainland China, the main stage was broadcast by the same broadcasters as the qualifying round, with additional coverage on CCTV5. It was broadcast by TNT Sports and Discovery+ in the United Kingdom and Ireland. In mainland Europe, it was broadcast by Eurosport, with coverage by Discovery+ in Germany, Italy, and Austria and HBO Max in other European territories. It was broadcast by Now TV in Hong Kong, by True Sports in Thailand, and by Sportcast in Taiwan. In territories where no other coverage was available, it was streamed by WST Play.

=== Prize fund ===
The breakdown of prize money for this event is shown below:

- Winner: £177,000
- Runner-up: £76,000
- Semi-final: £34,500
- Quarter-final: £22,350
- Last 16: £14,000
- Last 32: £9,400
- Last 64: £5,350
- Highest break: £5,000
- Total: £850,000

== Summary ==
=== Round one (qualifying) ===
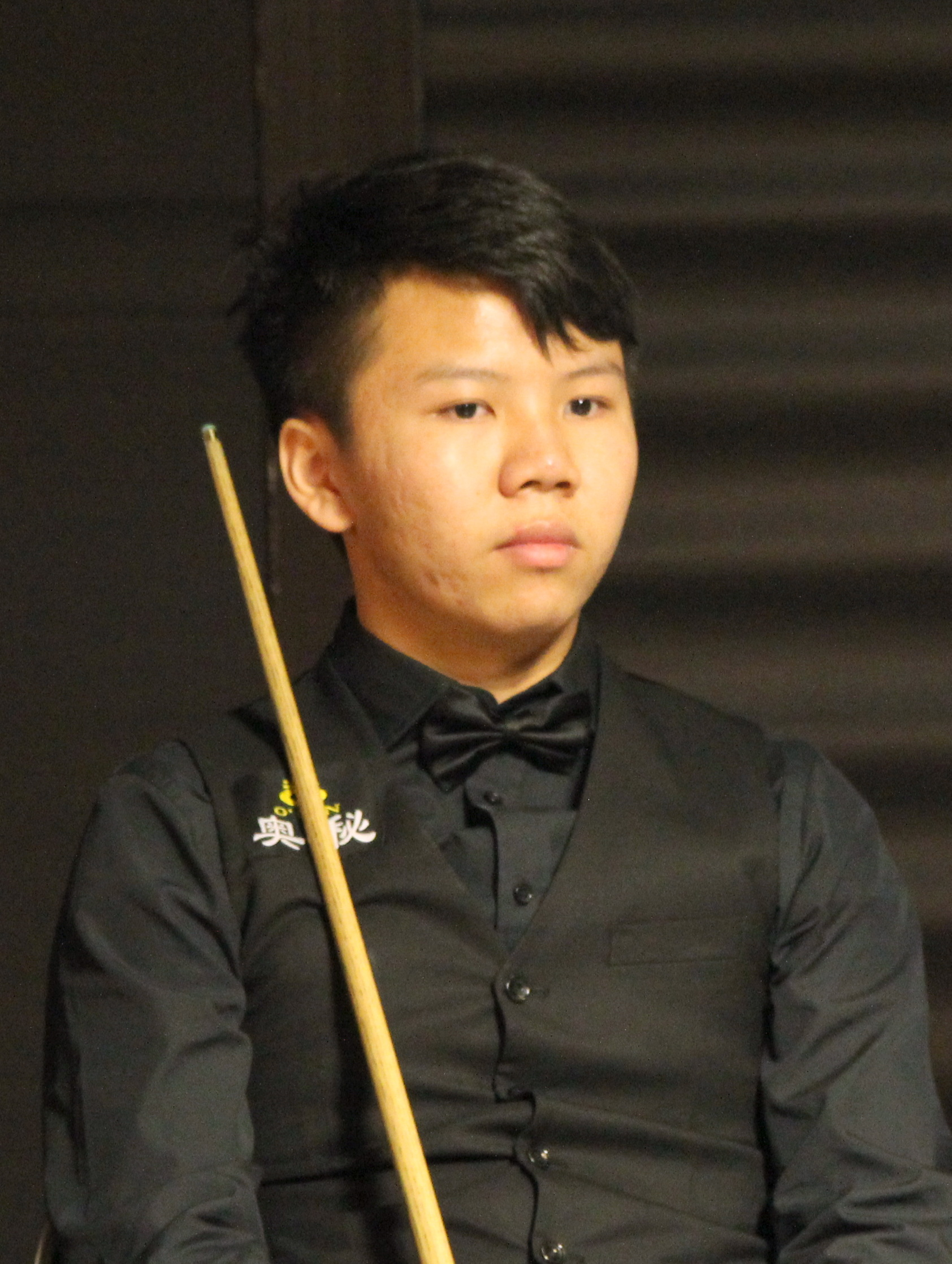
Zhou Yuelong (pictured in 2016) made the third maximum break of his career during qualifying in Leicester.

In the qualifiers held in Leicester, Zhou Yuelong made the third maximum break of his career in the fourth frame of his 5–2 victory over Julien Leclercq. It was the eighth maximum of the season and the 225th in professional snooker history. After missing the season's opening tournaments, Luca Brecel, the 2023 World Champion, made his first professional appearance in over four months. Facing Sunny Akani and playing with a new cue, Brecel scored just six points in the first two frames as he fell 0–2 behind. While trailing 1–40 in the third frame, he conceded the match, and Akani won 5–0 by default. The world number 111 Liam Pullen took a 4–1 lead over four-time World Champion John Higgins and went on to win the match 5–3. Stan Moody, who had recently reached his first ranking quarter-final at the 2025 Wuhan Open, recovered from 2–4 behind to defeat Amir Sarkhosh in a deciding frame. Farakh Ajaib came from 54 points behind in his decider against Zhang Anda to win the match on the last black. Xu Yichen, who had recently turned professional, made four consecutive half-century breaks as he came from 1–4 behind to beat Jack Lisowski in a deciding frame.

Michał Szubarczyk, aged 14, the youngest player ever to turn professional, took a 4–1 lead over Martin O'Donnell. O'Donnell recovered to tie the scores at 4–4, but Szubarczyk won the deciding frame. David Grace took a 4–0 lead over Anthony McGill, but McGill won four consecutive frames to force a decider, which lasted 48 minutes before Grace won the match on the last black. Mark Allen and Wu Yize also advanced to the main stage by winning deciding frames against Mitchell Mann and Florian Nüßle respectively. Louis Heathcote beat Lei Peifan 5–3, making a 135 break in the last frame. New professional player Yao Pengcheng made a 137 break as he defeated Zak Surety 5–1. Jiang Jun, the world number 124, whitewashed the world number 25 Hossein Vafaei, while Barry Hawkins made century breaks of 121 and 134 as he whitewashed Hatem Yassen. Marco Fu made breaks of 106, 99, and 71 as he beat Sanderson Lam 5–1, and Stephen Maguire made a highest break of 85 as he defeated Bai Yulu, the reigning World Women's Champion, by a scoreline of 5–2. Wang Yuchen lost the first three frames against Pang Junxu but recovered to win five consecutive frames for a 5–3 victory.

In the held-over qualifiers in Xi'an, Judd Trump made the ninth maximum break of his career, and his first since 2022, in the fifth frame of his 5–2 win over Ng On-yee. It was the 12th maximum of the season and the 229th in professional snooker history. Ronnie O'Sullivan played his 1,000th match at a ranking event and made two centuries of 107 and 112 as he whitewashed Iulian Boiko. Following his first competitive match since the 2025 Saudi Arabia Snooker Masters, O'Sullivan said: "I haven't played for nearly two months so it felt a bit strange to play a serious game. I felt a bit rusty. My preparation on the practice table has been good, but practice and playing matches are very different." The defending champion and world number two Kyren Wilson made breaks of 52, 60, 103, and 76 as he defeated Haris Tahir 5–1. Wilson, who had not reached a semi-final since winning the 2025 Shanghai Masters, stated that he had spent less time practising in previous weeks due to his wife's health issues. Ding Junhui defeated Sam Craigie 5–1, and Neil Robertson beat Leone Crowley by the same score. Gary Wilson produced back-to-back centuries of 123 and 144 as he whitewashed Zhang Xiao. The reigning World Champion Zhao Xintong defeated Wang Xinbo 5–2, and the world number 15 Chris Wakelin lost 3–5 to wildcard player Zhang Hao.

=== Round two (last 64) ===
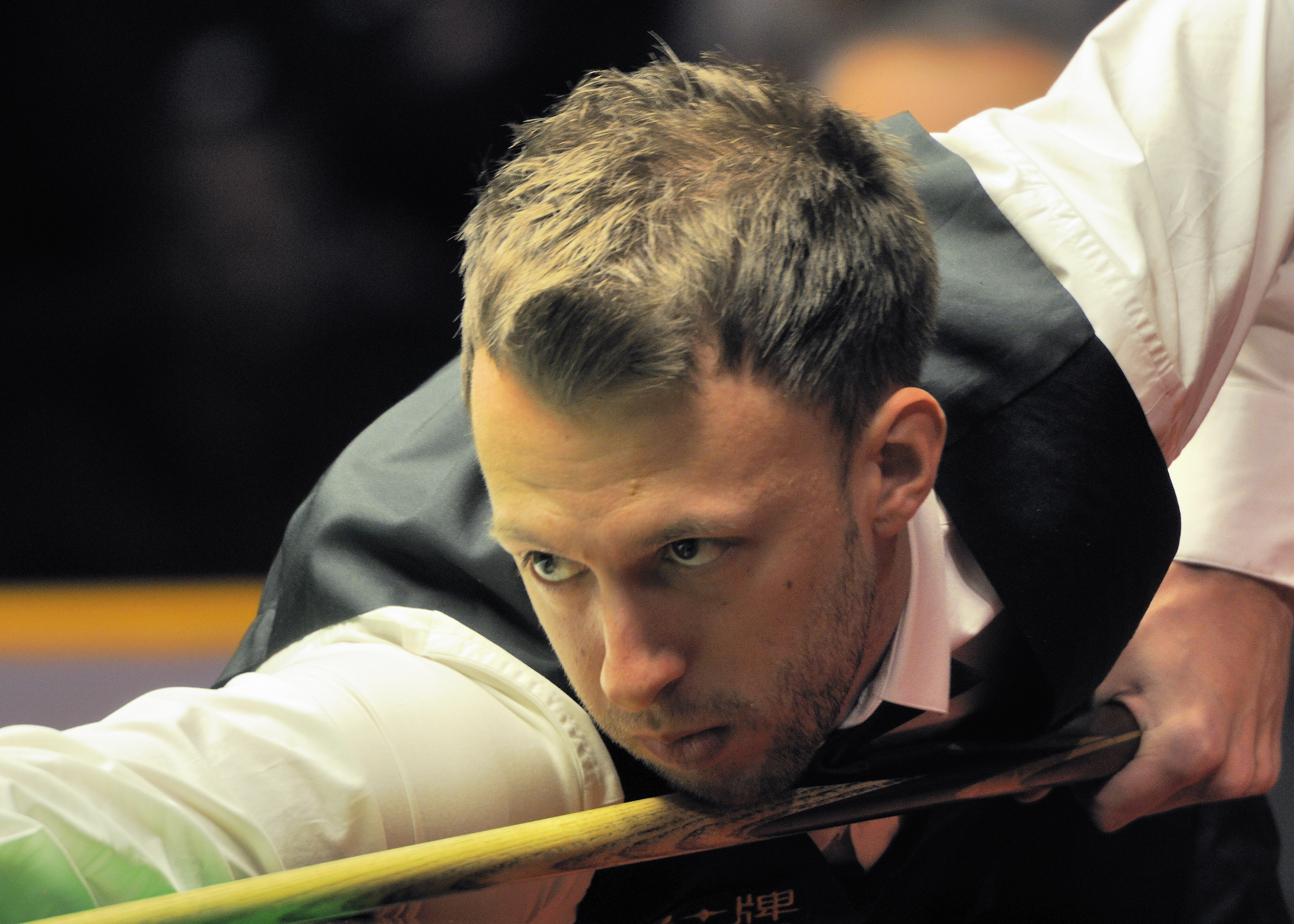
The world number one and previous year's runner-up Judd Trump (pictured in 2014) made a maximum break in the held-over qualifiers but lost to Matthew Stevens in the second round.

Aaron Hill made the second maximum break of his career during his 5–2 win over Huang Jiahao, having made his first maximum 23 days earlier at the 2025 English Open. It was the 13th maximum break of the season and the 230th in professional snooker history. Trump and Hill both made their maximums on 7 October, marking the fifth time in the sport's history that multiple 147s were made on the same day. Zhou Yuelong, recently runner-up at the 2025 English Open, made two centuries and three half-centuries as he beat Ryan Day 5–2. Louis Heathcote whitewashed Jackson Page, and Elliot Slessor made centuries of 132 and 117 to eliminate Ricky Walden 5–3. Jak Jones defeated Dylan Emery 5–1.

Facing Matthew Stevens, the world number one and previous year's runner-up Trump took a 3–1 lead, but Stevens then won three frames in a row to move 4–3 ahead. Trump required snookers in frame eight, as he trailed by 38 points with only the colours remaining, but he secured penalty points from fouls on the blue and pink and went on to win the frame on a re-spotted black to tie the scores at 4–4. However, Trump failed to score in the decider as Stevens won the frame and match. Trump's loss meant that he had not reached a ranking quarter-final since the 2025 World Championship. O'Sullivan made a century of 128 and three further half-centuries as he defeated Yao Pengcheng 5–1. "I feel like I'm cueing as well as I have done since 2012," O'Sullivan said afterwards. "I played well between 2016 and 2019, but the last few years were pretty awful. I know I had some good wins but I was struggling with ball striking. At the moment I'm hitting the ball so pure and so clean."

The reigning World Champion Zhao, who also had not reached a ranking quarter-final since the World Championship, lost 2–5 to the world number 56 Robert Milkins in a match that produced only two half-century breaks. Zhao took a 2–1 lead, but Milkins then won four consecutive frames to advance. "I was expecting Zhao to play better, but he struggled," Milkins said afterwards. "You just have to take it. I've lost a lot of deciders this season and it has put me in a bad position. I've really been struggling and everything is like a pint of blood at the moment." The 10th seed Mark Selby and the 11th seed Allen lost in deciding frames to Mark Davis and Oliver Lines respectively. The world number 49 Moody advanced with a 5–3 victory over Ali Carter.

=== Round three (last 32) ===
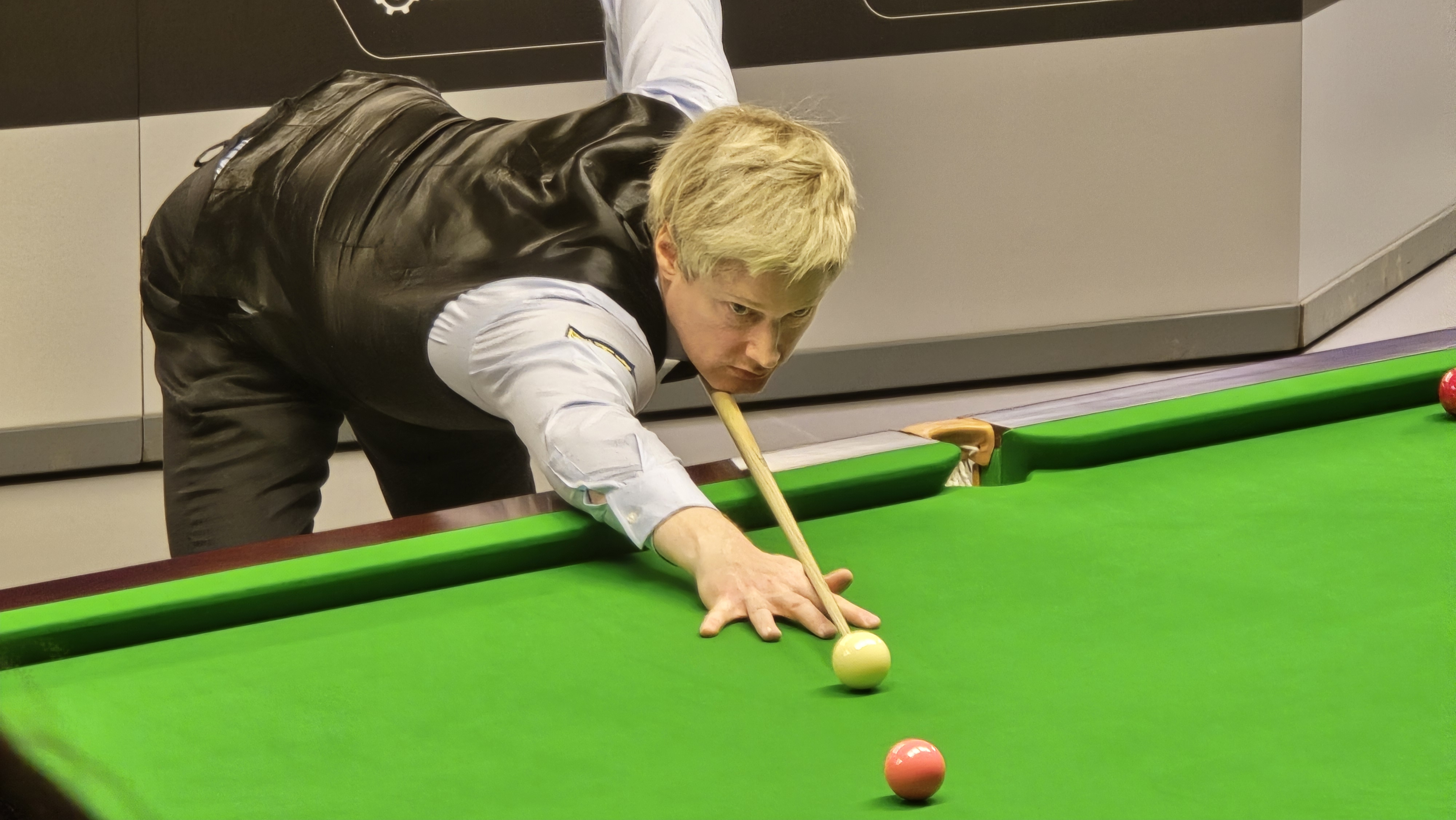
The world number three Neil Robertson (pictured in 2025) lost to He Guoqiang in a deciding frame.

Kyren Wilson made two centuries as he continued his title defence with a 5–2 victory over Yuan Sijun. "It's a great feeling defending the title and I want to make that last as long as possible," Wilson said afterwards. "I really enjoyed being here for the first time last year so I was looking forward to coming back. When you are excited and happy as a player, it brings out the best in you." O'Sullivan made a century of 134 as he whitewashed Maguire, meaning that he reached the last 16 having lost just one frame. Maguire scored just 25 points in the match. "This game has a way of humbling you," O'Sullivan commented afterwards. "So far I'm very happy, but maybe next month I'll be saying this game is really hard. You have to enjoy it when it's good, and when it's not you have to get through those periods." Pullen made breaks of 103, 83, 96, 101, and 77 as he whitewashed Noppon Saengkham to reach the last 16 of a ranking event for the second time. Afterwards, Pullen called the victory "the best win of my career and the best I have played."

Lines recovered from 2–4 behind to defeat Slessor with a clearance of 58 in the deciding frame. "I kept telling myself I was going to do it, and that calmed me down," said Lines of his match-winning break. Milkins defeated Jimmy Robertson in a decider, making three centuries of 127, 113, and 121 in the match, including his 200th century in professional competition. The world number three Neil Robertson made century breaks of 126 and 103 but lost in a deciding frame to He Guoqiang. Facing Wu, Shaun Murphy made breaks of 140, 94, 138, and 78 and won the match in a decider. Gary Wilson made two centuries as he beat Mateusz Baranowski, also in a deciding frame. Hawkins defeated Thepchaiya Un-Nooh 5–2, and Mark Williams beat Zhou Yuelong by the same score. Hill defeated Davis 5–1, making breaks of 97, 131, 81, and 102, and Stuart Bingham advanced with a whitewash victory over Moody.

=== Round four (last 16) ===
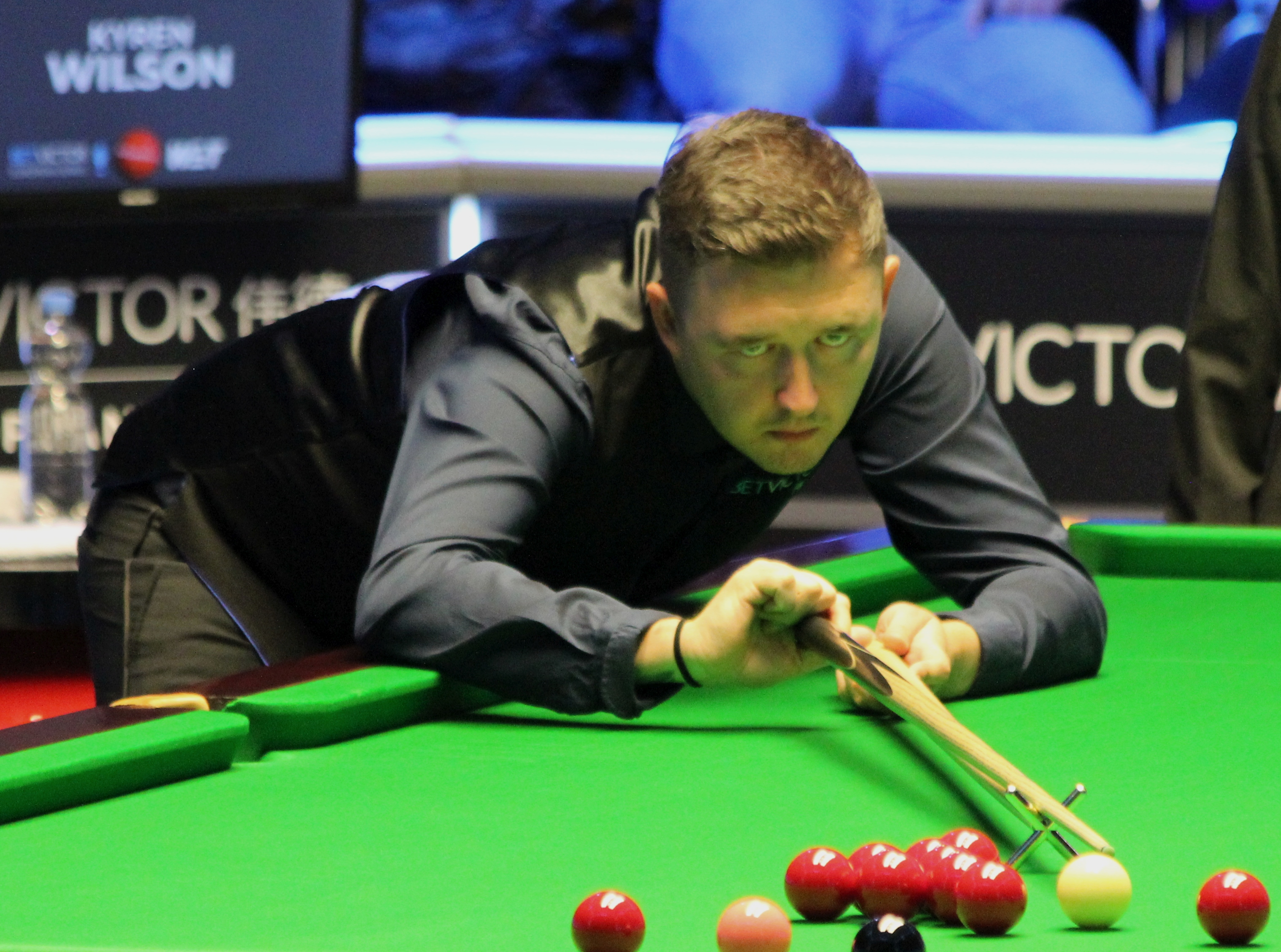
The defending champion Kyren Wilson (pictured in 2022) did not pot a ball against Shaun Murphy, who scored 533 points without reply and won the match 5–0.

Murphy made breaks of 74, 141, 133, 84, and 84 as he whitewashed the defending champion and world number two Kyren Wilson. Murphy scored 533 points without reply, 23 points short of O'Sullivan's all-time professional record of 556 unanswered points against Walden at the 2014 Masters and 14 points short of Bingham's ranking event record of 547 points without reply against Sam Baird at the 2016 China Open. Wilson did not pot a ball, receiving his only six points of the match when Murphy fouled the pink at the end of the last frame. "That's pretty much as good as I've ever played," said Murphy afterwards. "You play so many matches around the world throughout your life and every now and then it comes together." Gary Wilson also recorded a whitewash victory over He Guoqiang, making breaks of 84, 101, 117, and 89. Daniel Wells made four half-century breaks as he beat Milkins 5–2. Pullen, aged 20, defeated Hill 5–1 to reach the quarter-finals of a ranking event for the first time in his career.

O'Sullivan, a semi-finalist in the tournament the previous year, produced two century breaks of 135 and 100 as he established a 4–1 lead over Jak Jones, a former World Championship runner-up. Jones made a century of 140 to win frame six, but O'Sullivan then secured a 5–2 victory with an 81 break. Ding made centuries of 134 and 121 as he advanced to the quarter-finals with a 5–1 win over Lines. "Right now I'm not thinking as far ahead as winning the tournament. I don't want to overthink things and I also hope people don't put too much pressure on me," Ding said afterwards. Williams recovered from 3–4 behind to defeat Hawkins, making a century of 125 in the deciding frame. Lyu Haotian progressed with a 5–3 win over Bingham.

=== Quarter-finals ===
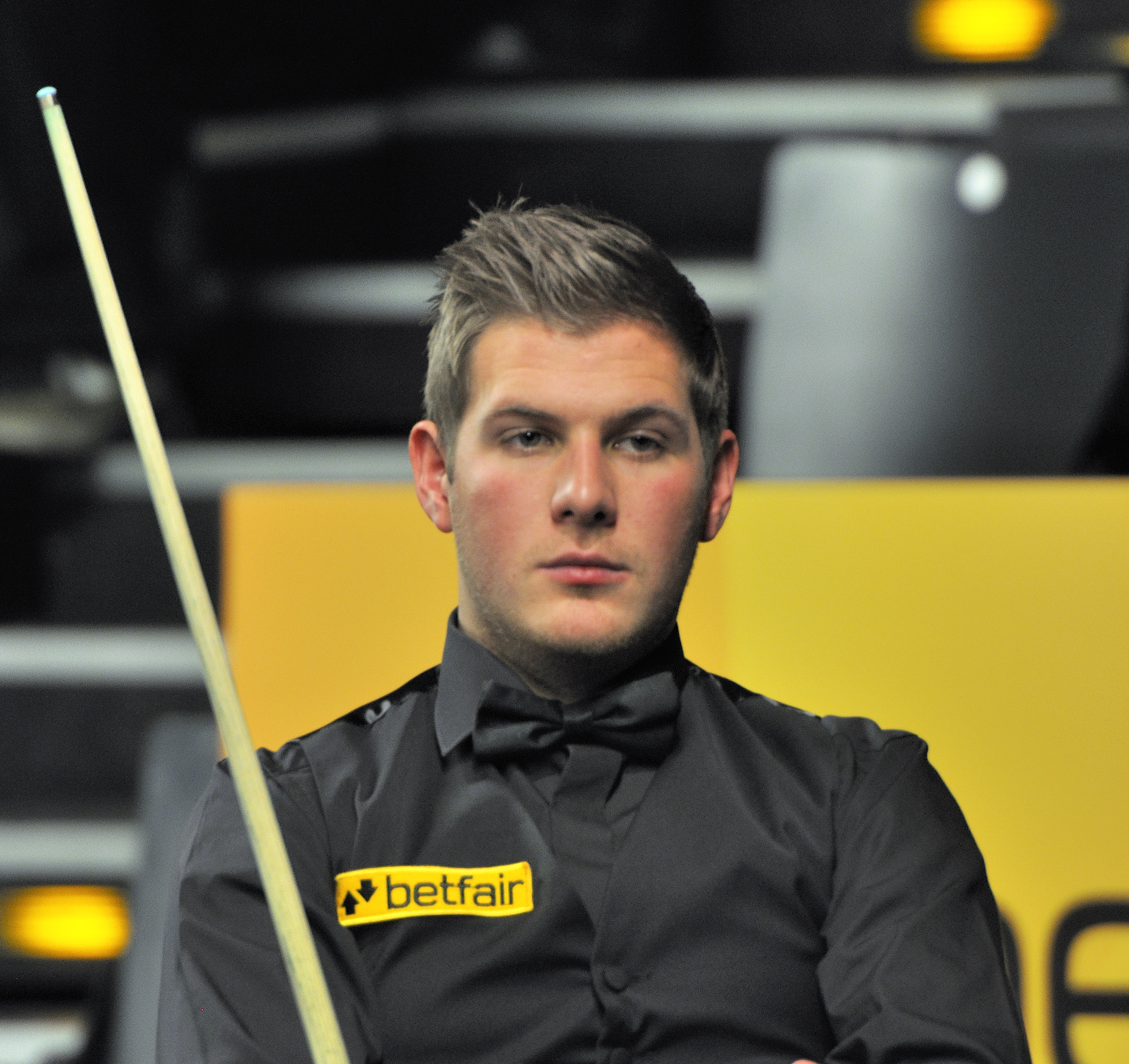
Daniel Wells (pictured in 2013) defeated Liam Pullen 5–2 to reach the semi-finals of the tournament for a second consecutive year.

Williams and Lyu were tied at 2–2. Williams then made breaks of 68 and 70 as he took a 4–2 lead, but Lyu responded with breaks of 94 and 62 to tie the scores at 4–4. Williams won the 36-minute deciding frame to reach his 69th ranking semi-final. "I didn't play great, but I stuck in there," Williams said afterwards. "He let me off the hook a little bit. He was the better player, but I managed to find a way to scrape over the line." Pullen and Wells were also tied at 2–2, but Wells then took three frames in a row to win 5–2 and reach the semi-finals of the tournament for a second consecutive year. It was the fourth time Wells had reached a ranking semi-final. "I'm here to win," Wells said afterwards, noting that he had been working on the mental side of the game as well as his fitness levels. "If you told a 12-year-old me that I would play Mark Williams in the semi-final of a major tournament, it would have been a dream come true. But it is the reality now. I don't want to go home in the semi-final."

Gary Wilson, runner-up at the 2025 Wuhan Open earlier in the season, faced O'Sullivan, whom he had beaten only once in their eight previous professional meetings. Wilson won the first three frames with breaks of 74, 101, and 79. O'Sullivan won the next two, but Wilson won frame six with a century of 120 and then took the seventh for a 5–2 victory. "Against [O'Sullivan], you can tell he's trying to look at signs," Wilson commented afterwards. "Trying to tell if you feel good, or you feel bad. Whether you are taking your chances or you aren't. If you are bottling it. All of that goes through your head. He feeds off that. You need to try and block it out of your head." Facing Ding, Murphy made breaks of 77, 66, and 121 as he took a 4–1 lead. Ding won the next two frames, but Murphy took frame eight with a 94 break to secure a 5–3 victory.

=== Semi-finals ===
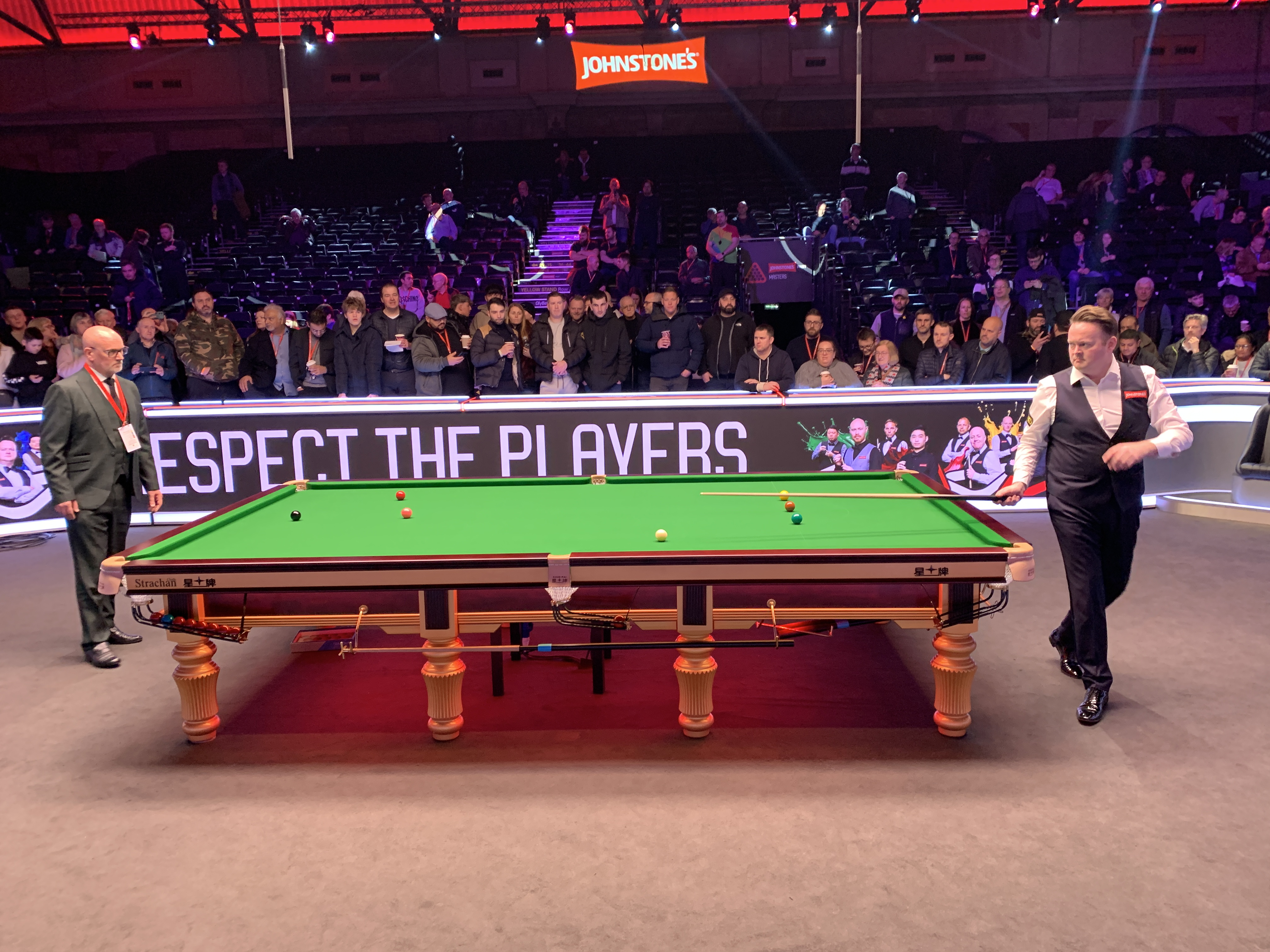
Shaun Murphy (right; pictured in 2025) made total clearances of 131, 140, and 141 as he defeated Gary Wilson 6–4 to reach his 28th ranking final.

In the first semi-final, Williams faced Wells. The scores were tied at 2–2 at the mid-session interval. Wells won frame five on the last pink, but Williams took the next to tie the scores again at 3–3. After six frames, the highest break of the match was just 42, but Williams then produced breaks of 129 and 53 as he moved 5–3 ahead. Wells required snookers in frame nine, as Williams led by 33 points with just the colours remaining, but Wells secured the penalty points he needed by laying snookers on the yellow. However, Williams then laid two snookers on the brown, and Wells conceded the frame after failing to escape from the second. Williams won the match 6–3. Defeat for Wells meant that he had played in four ranking semi-finals without reaching a final. "Most of my games this week have been the same, pretty poor," said Williams afterwards. "I scraped over the line again. I'm glad to win. Apart from the one century break, it was tough out there. I might have looked calm but you wouldn't want to know the names I was calling myself in my head."

In the second semi-final, Murphy played Gary Wilson. Murphy won the first frame with a 91 break, but Wilson responded with breaks including 81 and a total clearance of 139 as he won three frames in a row to lead 3–1 at the mid-session interval. Murphy then made breaks including 81 and total clearances of 131 and 140 as he won four consecutive frames to lead 5–3. Wilson took frame nine with a 74 break, but Murphy made another total clearance of 141 in frame 10 to secure a 6–4 victory, his 13th consecutive win on the professional tour. In all, the match produced four breaks over 130 and four more breaks over 70. "This vein of form won't last forever but I am enjoying it," Murphy said afterwards. "I played well [at the 2025 English Open] in Brentwood, played well [at the 2025 British Open] in Cheltenham and I was delighted to lift the trophy. Here this week I've got another chance. But I have got one of the best of all time in my way and he will give me nothing." By reaching the final, Murphy ensured that he would re-enter the top 10 in the world rankings after the event and qualify for the 2025 Riyadh Season Snooker Championship in Saudi Arabia.

=== Final ===
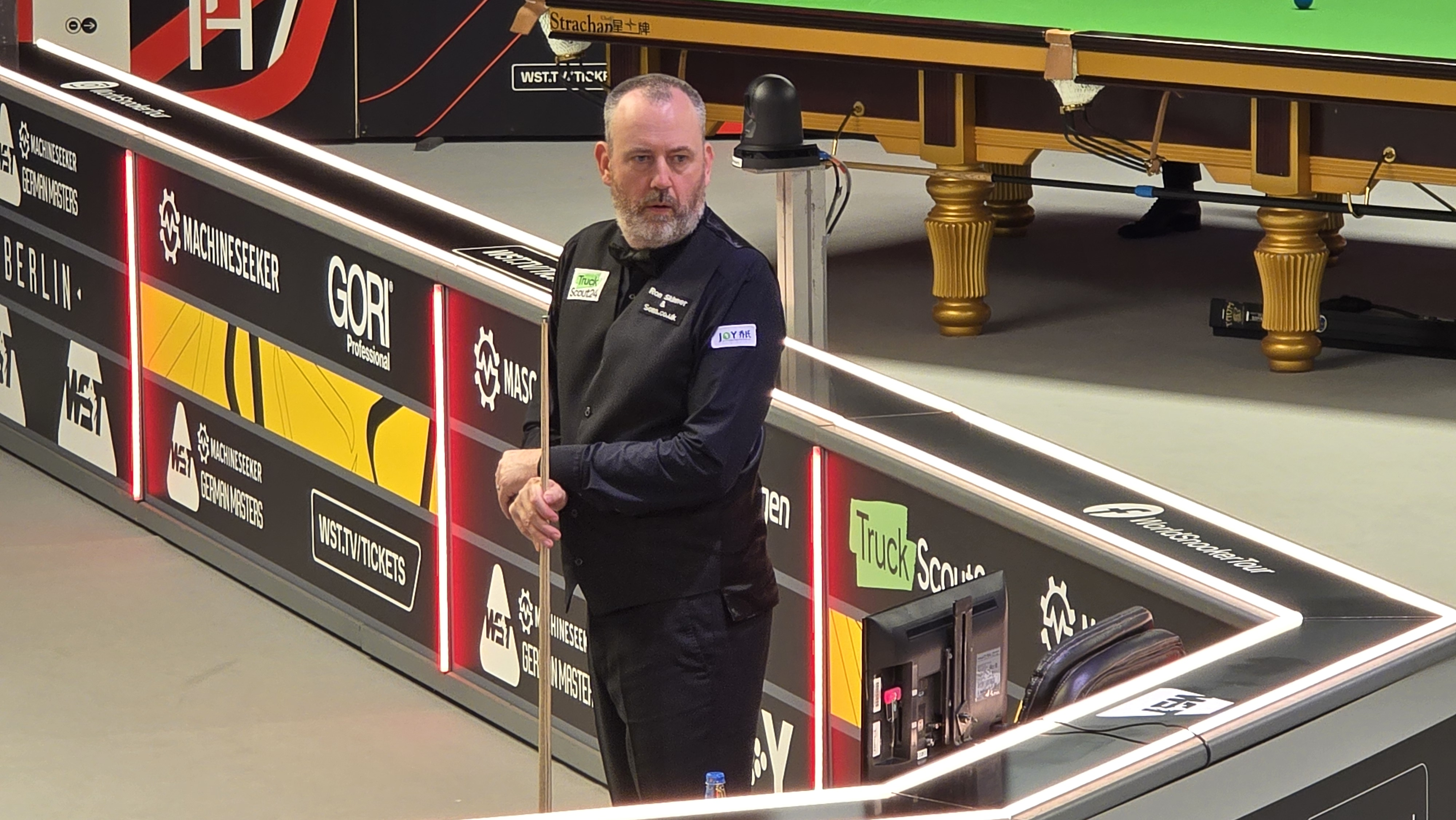
Mark Williams (pictured in 2025) defeated Shaun Murphy 10–3 to win his 27th ranking title. Aged 50 years and 206 days, he became the oldest ranking event winner, surpassing Ray Reardon.

The final was played as the best of 19 frames, held over two sessions, between the world number 5 Williams and the world number 12 Murphy. Williams contested the 44th ranking final of his career, while Murphy competed in his 28th. Murphy had won 10 of the previous 17 professional matches between the two players. Williams won the opening frame with a 75 break, recovered from 32 points behind to win the second with a break of 73, and made clearances of 56 and 68 in the next two frames to lead 4–0 at the mid-session interval. Murphy won frame five with a 69 break, but Williams took the sixth to restore a four-frame advantage at 5–1. Williams then made breaks of 59 and 55 to win frame seven and a century of 127 to win frame eight as he extended his lead to 7–1 after the first session.

When play resumed for the second session, Williams won the ninth frame with a century of 122. Murphy won the next two frames, making a 93 break in the 11th, but Williams took the 12th frame with a 65 break and won the 13th with breaks of 61 and 22 to complete a 10–3 victory. It was the 27th ranking title of his career. "I played really well from the first frame to the last," said Williams, who advanced from 5th to 4th place in the world rankings after his win. "I don't think I missed more than a couple of easy balls all day. I put pressure on [Murphy] and he missed a couple of times from 50 in front. I made some good clearances and kept the pressure on. I think I made more frame-winning breaks today than I did in the whole tournament." Murphy's loss was his 15th defeat in his 28 ranking finals, although he advanced from 12th to 9th in the world rankings as runner-up. "[Williams] was very tough and the better man on the day," Murphy said afterwards. "I missed a few shots and he punished me. His safety was good and his tactics were strong."

At the age of 50 years and 206 days, Williams became the oldest winner of a ranking event, breaking a 43-year-old record by Ray Reardon, who had been 50 years and 14 days old when he won the 1982 Professional Players Tournament. Williams also became the first player to win professional titles in his teens, 20s, 30s, 40s, and 50s. "It's unbelievable," he said. "I cannot honestly believe how I'm still winning tournaments. I'm not practicing enough to really compete in the latter stages of tournaments because I just can't do it these days. But here I am at the venue trying to play as much as I can, and you've got to scrape me off the table until that last ball is potted. I just seem to be scraping results and playing well in the final."

== Main draw ==
The draw for the tournament is shown below. Numbers in parentheses after the players' names denote the top 32 seeded players, and players in bold denote match winners. An (a) indicates amateur players not on the World Snooker Tour.

=== Top half ===
**Last 64**; Best of 9 frames
**Kyren Wilson** (ENG) (1) | **w/o**
Marco Fu (HKG) (Note: Marco Fu withdrew due to a fractured elbow and so Kyren Wilson received a walkover to the last 32.) | w/d
**Yuan Sijun** (CHN) (29) | **w/o**
Jamie Jones (WAL) (Note: Jamie Jones withdrew and so Yuan Sijun received a walkover to the last 32.) | w/d
**Shaun Murphy (ENG) (15)** | **5**
Long Zehuang (CHN) | 0
**Wu Yize (CHN) (18)** | **5**
Xu Si (CHN) | 2
Ricky Walden (ENG) | 3
**Elliot Slessor (ENG) (22)** | **5**
**Oliver Lines (ENG)** | **5**
Mark Allen (NIR) (11) | 4
Jackson Page (WAL) | 0
**Louis Heathcote (ENG)** | **5**
Jordan Brown (NIR) | 1
**Ding Junhui (CHN) (8)** | **5**
**Ronnie O'Sullivan (ENG) (5)** | **5**
Yao Pengcheng (CHN) | 1
**Stephen Maguire (SCO) (25)** | **5**
Robbie Williams (ENG) | 2
Farakh Ajaib (PAK) | 1
**David Lilley (ENG)** | **5**
**Jak Jones (WAL) (21)** | **5**
Dylan Emery (WAL) | 1
Sunny Akani (THA) | 1
**Gary Wilson (ENG) (17)** | **5**
**Mateusz Baranowski (POL)** | **5**
Zhang Hao (CHN) (a) | 2
**He Guoqiang (CHN)** | **5**
Xu Yichen (CHN) | 3
Ishpreet Singh Chadha (IND) | 3
**Neil Robertson (AUS) (4)** | **5**

**Last 32**; Best of 9 frames
**(England) Kyren Wilson (1)** | **5**
(China) Yuan Sijun (29) | 2
**(England) Shaun Murphy (15)** | **5**
(China) Wu Yize (18) | 4
(England) Elliot Slessor (22) | 4
**(England) Oliver Lines** | **5**
(England) Louis Heathcote | 3
**(China) Ding Junhui (8)** | **5**
**(England) Ronnie O'Sullivan (5)** | **5**
(Scotland) Stephen Maguire (25) | 0
(England) David Lilley | 3
**(Wales) Jak Jones (21)** | **5**
**(England) Gary Wilson (17)** | **5**
(Poland) Mateusz Baranowski | 4
**(China) He Guoqiang** | **5**
(Australia) Neil Robertson (4) | 4

**Last 16**; Best of 9 frames
(England) Kyren Wilson (1) | 0
**(England) Shaun Murphy (15)** | **5**
(England) Oliver Lines | 1
**(China) Ding Junhui (8)** | **5**
**(England) Ronnie O'Sullivan (5)** | **5**
(Wales) Jak Jones (21) | 2
**(England) Gary Wilson (17)** | **5**
(China) He Guoqiang | 0

**Quarter-finals**; Best of 9 frames
**(England) Shaun Murphy (15)** | **5**
(China) Ding Junhui (8) | 3
(England) Ronnie O'Sullivan (5) | 2
**(England) Gary Wilson (17)** | **5**

**Semi-finals**; Best of 11 frames
**(England) Shaun Murphy (15)** | **6**
(England) Gary Wilson (17) | 4

Note: w/d=withdrawn; w/o=walkover

=== Bottom half ===
**Last 64**; Best of 9 frames
Judd Trump (ENG) (3) | 4
**Matthew Stevens (WAL)** | **5**
Wang Yuchen (HKG) | 4
**Lyu Haotian (CHN)** | **5**
Ali Carter (ENG) (16) | 3
**Stan Moody (ENG)** | **5**
**Stuart Bingham (ENG) (20)** | **5**
Matthew Selt (ENG) | 3
**Thepchaiya Un-Nooh (THA)** | **5**
Jiang Jun (CHN) | 3
David Grace (ENG) | 2
**Barry Hawkins (ENG) (9)** | **5**
Ryan Day (WAL) | 2
**Zhou Yuelong (CHN) (31)** | **5**
Scott Donaldson (SCO) (Note: Scott Donaldson withdrew and so Mark Williams received a walkover to the last 32.) | w/d
**Mark Williams** (WAL) (6) | **w/o**
**Liam Pullen (ENG)** | **5**
Michael Holt (ENG) | 3
**Noppon Saengkham (THA) (32)** | **5**
Michał Szubarczyk (POL) | 1
Mark Selby (ENG) (10) | 4
**Mark Davis (ENG)** | **5**
Huang Jiahao (CHN) | 2
**Aaron Hill (IRL)** | **5**
**Daniel Wells (WAL)** | **5**
David Gilbert (ENG) (23) | 1
Fan Zhengyi (CHN) | 4
**Si Jiahui (CHN) (14)** | **5**
**Jimmy Robertson (ENG)** | **5**
Joe O'Connor (ENG) (26) | 1
**Robert Milkins (ENG)** | **5**
Zhao Xintong (CHN) (2) | 2

**Last 32**; Best of 9 frames
(Wales) Matthew Stevens | 4
**(China) Lyu Haotian** | **5**
(England) Stan Moody | 0
**(England) Stuart Bingham (20)** | **5**
(Thailand) Thepchaiya Un-Nooh | 2
**(England) Barry Hawkins (9)** | **5**
(China) Zhou Yuelong (31) | 2
**(Wales) Mark Williams (6)** | **5**
**(England) Liam Pullen** | **5**
(Thailand) Noppon Saengkham (32) | 0
(England) Mark Davis | 1
**(Republic of Ireland) Aaron Hill** | **5**
**(Wales) Daniel Wells** | **5**
(China) Si Jiahui (14) | 3
(England) Jimmy Robertson | 4
**(England) Robert Milkins** | **5**

**Last 16**; Best of 9 frames
**(China) Lyu Haotian** | **5**
(England) Stuart Bingham (20) | 3
(England) Barry Hawkins (9) | 4
**(Wales) Mark Williams (6)** | **5**
**(England) Liam Pullen** | **5**
(Republic of Ireland) Aaron Hill | 1
**(Wales) Daniel Wells** | **5**
(England) Robert Milkins | 2

**Quarter-finals**; Best of 9 frames
(China) Lyu Haotian | 4
**(Wales) Mark Williams (6)** | **5**
(England) Liam Pullen | 2
**(Wales) Daniel Wells** | **5**

**Semi-finals**; Best of 11 frames
**(Wales) Mark Williams (6)** | **6**
(Wales) Daniel Wells | 3

Note: w/d=withdrawn; w/o=walkover

=== Final: frame scores ===
Final: Best of 19 frames. Referee: Lyu Zhiwei; Qujiang Sports Complex, Xi'an, China, 13 October 2025
| Shaun Murphy (15); England | 3–**10** | **Mark Williams** (6); Wales |
Afternoon: 0–**75**, 44–**85**, 55–**73**, 45–**68**, **73**–21, 37–**97**, 8–**132**, 8–**127** (127); Evening: 0–**122** (122), **64**–0, **93**–5, 20–**92**, 15–**83**
| (frame 11) 93 | Highest break | **127** (frame 8) |
| 0 | Century breaks | **2** |

== Qualifying draw ==
=== Xi'an ===
The results of the held-over qualifying matches played in Xi'an are given below. An (a) indicates amateur players not on the World Snooker Tour.

- Chatchapong Nasa (THA) 2–5 Zhou Jinhao (CHN) (a) (Note: Pre-qualifying match to decide the opponent of Mark Williams in the held-over qualifying round.)
- Kyren Wilson (ENG) 5–1 Haris Tahir (PAK)
- Gary Wilson (ENG) 5–0 Zhang Xiao (CHN) (a)
- Chris Wakelin (ENG) 3–5 Zhang Hao (CHN) (a)
- Neil Robertson (AUS) 5–1 Leone Crowley (IRL)
- Judd Trump (ENG) 5–2 Ng On-yee (HKG)
- Zhao Xintong (CHN) 5–2 Wang Xinbo (CHN) (a)
- Ding Junhui (CHN) 5–1 Sam Craigie (ENG)
- Mark Williams (WAL) 5–2 Zhou Jinhao (CHN) (a)
- Ronnie O'Sullivan (ENG) 5–0 Iulian Boiko (UKR)

=== Leicester ===
The results of the qualifying matches played in Leicester are given below.

- Yuan Sijun (CHN) 5–1 Mahmoud El Hareedy (EGY)
- Long Zehuang (CHN) 5–1 Artemijs Žižins (LAT)
- Wu Yize (CHN) 5–4 Florian Nüßle (AUT)
- Xu Si (CHN) 5–1 Bulcsú Révész (HUN)
- Oliver Lines (ENG) 5–1 Gao Yang (CHN)
- Lei Peifan (CHN) 3–5 Louis Heathcote (ENG)
- Jak Jones (WAL) 5–0 Haydon Pinhey (ENG)
- Zak Surety (ENG) 1–5 Yao Pengcheng (CHN)
- Robbie Williams (ENG) 5–1 Fergal Quinn (NIR)
- David Lilley (ENG) 5–3 Kreishh Gurbaxani (IND)
- Mark Selby (ENG) 5–0 Gong Chenzhi (CHN)
- Fan Zhengyi (CHN) 5–1 Ben Mertens (BEL)
- Joe O'Connor (ENG) 5–2 Lan Yuhao (CHN)
- Robert Milkins (ENG) 5–1 Mink Nutcharut (THA)
- Ricky Walden (ENG) 5–1 Liam Davies (WAL)
- Mark Allen (NIR) 5–4 Mitchell Mann (ENG)
- Ali Carter (ENG) 5–1 Allan Taylor (ENG)
- Anthony McGill (SCO) 4–5 David Grace (ENG)
- Noppon Saengkham (THA) 5–2 Alexander Ursenbacher (SWI)
- Martin O'Donnell (ENG) 4–5 Michał Szubarczyk (POL)
- David Gilbert (ENG) 5–1 Chris Totten (SCO)
- Zhang Anda (CHN) 4–5 Farakh Ajaib (PAK)
- Liu Hongyu (CHN) 4–5 Mateusz Baranowski (POL)
- He Guoqiang (CHN) 5–1 Zhao Hanyang (CHN)
- Jack Lisowski (ENG) 4–5 Xu Yichen (CHN)
- Lyu Haotian (CHN) 5–2 Steven Hallworth (ENG)
- Zhou Yuelong (CHN) 5–2 Julien Leclercq (BEL)
- Si Jiahui (CHN) 5–3 Chang Bingyu (CHN)
- Shaun Murphy (ENG) 5–0 Liam Highfield (ENG)
- Elliot Slessor (ENG) 5–1 Liam Graham (SCO)
- Ishpreet Singh Chadha (IND) 5–0 Jonas Luz (BRA)
- Stan Moody (ENG) 5–4 Amir Sarkhosh (IRN)
- Matthew Selt (ENG) 5–4 Antoni Kowalski (POL)
- Thepchaiya Un-Nooh (THA) 5–1 Patrick Whelan (ENG) (a) (Note: Patrick Whelan replaced Mohammed Shehab, who withdrew.)
- Michael Holt (ENG) 5–1 Umut Dikme (GER) (a) (Note: Umut Dikme replaced Jimmy White, who withdrew.)
- Jamie Jones (WAL) 5–1 Connor Benzey (ENG)
- Jordan Brown (NIR) 5–1 Oliver Brown (ENG)
- Ben Woollaston (ENG) 3–5 Dylan Emery (WAL)
- Luca Brecel (BEL) 0–5 Sunny Akani (THA) (Note: In the match between Luca Brecel and Sunny Akani, Brecel conceded the match in the third frame with the score at 0–2 frames and 1–40 points.)
- Matthew Stevens (WAL) 5–0 Ian Burns (ENG)
- John Higgins (SCO) 3–5 Liam Pullen (ENG)
- Tom Ford (ENG) 3–5 Huang Jiahao (CHN)
- Stephen Maguire (SCO) 5–2 Bai Yulu (CHN)
- Pang Junxu (CHN) 3–5 Wang Yuchen (HKG)
- Hossein Vafaei (IRN) 0–5 Jiang Jun (CHN)
- Barry Hawkins (ENG) 5–0 Hatem Yassen (EGY)
- Mark Davis (ENG) 5–1 Reanne Evans (ENG)
- Aaron Hill (IRL) 5–2 Liu Wenwei (CHN)
- Jimmy Robertson (ENG) 5–2 Cheung Ka Wai (HKG)
- Sanderson Lam (ENG) 1–5 Marco Fu (HKG)
- Jackson Page (WAL) 5–3 Sahil Nayyar (CAN)
- Stuart Bingham (ENG) 5–2 Duane Jones (WAL)
- Ryan Day (WAL) 5–4 Ross Muir (SCO)
- Scott Donaldson (SCO) 5–1 Robbie McGuigan (NIR)
- Daniel Wells (WAL) 5–1 Ken Doherty (IRL)

== Century breaks ==
=== Main stage centuries ===
A total of 93 century breaks were made during the main stage of the tournament in Xi'an.

- 147, 131, 104, 102 – Aaron Hill
- 147, 100 – Judd Trump
- 144, 139, 123, 120, 117, 116, 112, 105, 102, 101, 101 – Gary Wilson
- 141, 141, 140, 140, 138, 133, 131, 123, 121 – Shaun Murphy
- 141, 139, 128 – Si Jiahui
- 140, 131, 126, 103 – Neil Robertson
- 140 – Jak Jones
- 136, 108, 100 – Wu Yize
- 135, 134, 128, 112, 107, 100 – Ronnie O'Sullivan
- 135, 128 – He Guoqiang
- 135 – Wang Yuchen
- 134, 121, 120, 115, 100 – Ding Junhui
- 132, 117, 102 – Elliot Slessor
- 132 – Wang Xinbo
- 131, 102 – Stephen Maguire
- 130 – Jimmy Robertson
- 129, 127, 125, 122, 104 – Mark Williams
- 129, 127, 121, 113 – Robert Milkins
- 129, 101 – Barry Hawkins
- 129 – Mark Davis
- 128, 120, 115 – Daniel Wells
- 127, 105 – Fan Zhengyi
- 127 – Xu Si
- 123, 105 – Thepchaiya Un-Nooh
- 121 – Louis Heathcote
- 115, 108 – Oliver Lines
- 113, 106, 103 – Kyren Wilson
- 112, 109, 100 – Zhou Yuelong
- 111 – Ali Carter
- 104 – Stuart Bingham
- 103, 101 – Liam Pullen
- 103 – Chatchapong Nasa
- 100 – Lyu Haotian

=== Qualifying stage centuries ===
A total of 25 century breaks were made during the qualifying stage of the tournament in Leicester.

- 147 – Zhou Yuelong
- 137 – Scott Donaldson
- 137 – Yao Pengcheng
- 135 – Louis Heathcote
- 135 – Wu Yize
- 134, 121 – Barry Hawkins
- 134 – Chang Bingyu
- 128, 114 – Thepchaiya Un-Nooh
- 126 – Jimmy Robertson
- 123 – Xu Si
- 119 – Si Jiahui
- 117 – Shaun Murphy
- 112 – Matthew Stevens
- 111, 103 – Mark Selby
- 111 – Steven Hallworth
- 109 – Liam Davies
- 107 – Noppon Saengkham
- 106 – Marco Fu
- 105 – Long Zehuang
- 102 – Cheung Ka Wai
- 100 – David Gilbert
- 100 – Jackson Page
