= 2026 German Masters =

January–February 2026 Snooker event, held in Germany

2026 Machineseeker German Masters

Tournament information
- Dates: 26 January – 1 February 2026
- Venue: Tempodrom
- City: Berlin
- Country: Germany
- Organisation: World Snooker Tour
- Format: Ranking event
- Total prize fund: £550,400
- Winner's share: £100,000
- Highest break: Zhang Anda (CHN) (147)

Final
- Champion: Judd Trump (ENG)
- Runner-up: Shaun Murphy (ENG)
- Score: 10–4

The 2026 German Masters (officially the 2026 Machineseeker German Masters) was a professional snooker tournament that took place from 26 January to 1 February 2026 at the Tempodrom in Berlin, Germany. Qualifying took place from 5 to 8 January at the Ponds Forge International Sports Centre in Sheffield, England. The 16th consecutive edition of the German Masters since it was revived in 2011, it was the 12th ranking event of the 2025–26 snooker season, following the 2025 Scottish Open and preceding the 2026 World Grand Prix. The tournament was broadcast by TNT Sports in the United Kingdom and Ireland, by Eurosport in mainland Europe, by local channels in China and elsewhere in Asia, and by WST Play in all other territories. The winner received £100,000 from a total prize fund of £550,400.

Kyren Wilson was the defending champion, having defeated Barry Hawkins 10–9 in the 2025 final, but he lost 1–5 to Shaun Murphy in the quarter-finals. The world number one Judd Trump defeated Murphy 10–4 in the final to win a record-extending fourth German Masters title and the 31st ranking title of his career. It was Trump's first professional title since winning the 2024 UK Championship 14 months earlier. The tournament produced a total of 109 century breaks, 58 during the qualifying matches played in Sheffield and 51 at the main stage in Berlin. The highest was a maximum break by Zhang Anda, the fifth of his career, during his last-32 match against Hawkins. It was the record-extending 22nd maximum of the season and the fourth in the history of the tournament.

== Overview ==
The tournament originated as the German Open, a ranking event that was held from 1995 to 1997. The inaugural German Open champion was John Higgins, who defeated Ken Doherty 9–3 in the 1995 final. After being staged once in 1998 as the non-ranking German Masters, the tournament dropped off the calendar; it was restored in 2011 as the ranking German Masters. The first winner of the tournament after its revival was Mark Williams, who defeated Mark Selby 9–7 in the 2011 final. In 2021, the tournament trophy was named the Brandon Parker Trophy in memory of the late manager, promoter, and World Snooker Tour director who first brought the tournament to Berlin's Tempodrom in 2011. Parker had died from cancer in 2020.

The 2026 edition of the tournament—its 16th consecutive staging since its revival in 2011—took place from 26 January to 1 February at the Tempodrom in Berlin, Germany. Qualifying took place from 5 to 8 January at the Ponds Forge International Sports Centre in Sheffield, England. It was the 12th ranking event of the 2025–26 snooker season, following the 2025 Scottish Open and preceding the 2026 World Grand Prix. Kyren Wilson was the defending champion, having defeated Barry Hawkins 10–9 in the 2025 final to win his second German Masters title.

=== Format ===
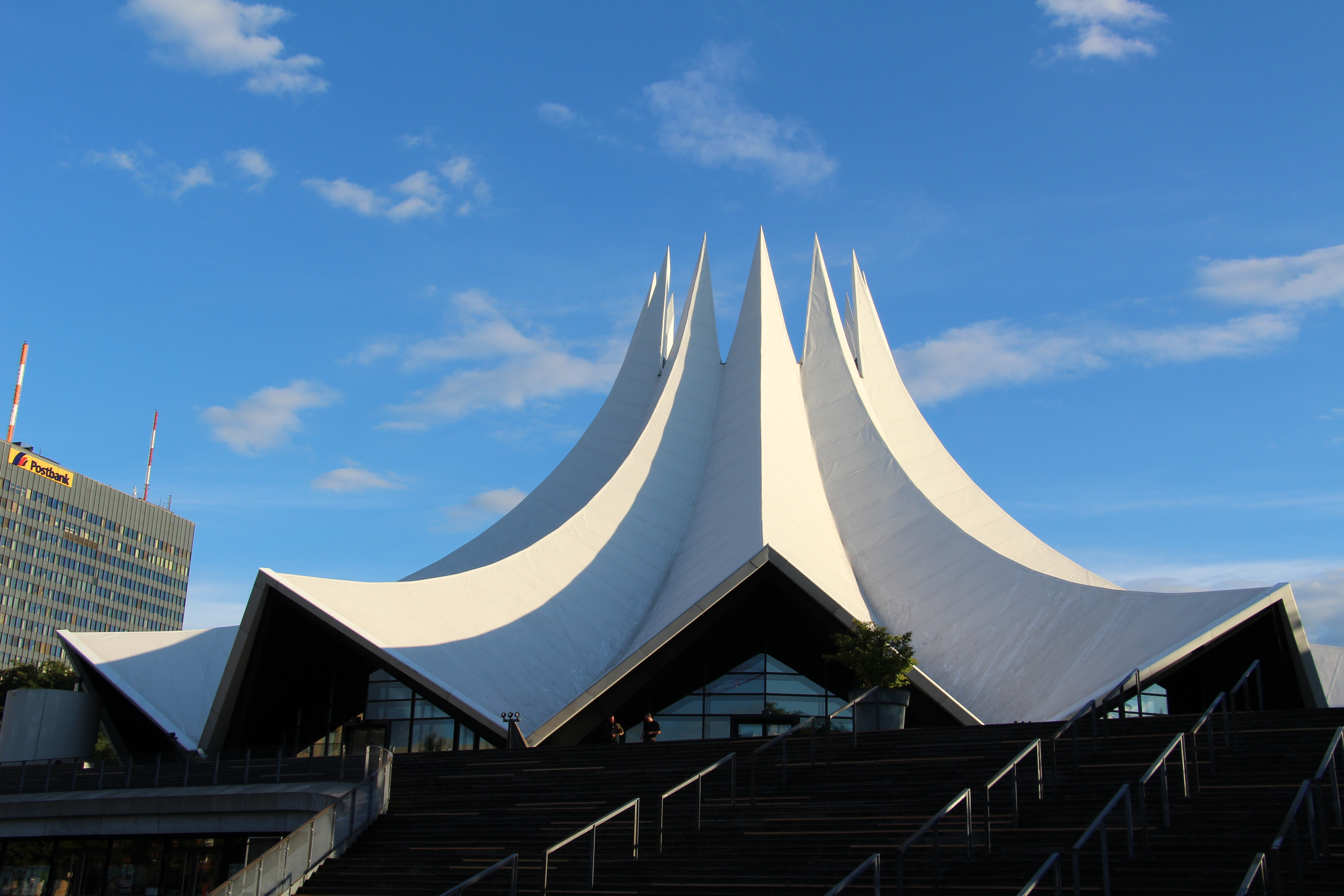
The tournament's main stage took place at the Tempodrom (pictured in 2016) in Berlin.

A total of 128 players entered the tournament. Qualifying took place over three rounds, with higher ranked players given byes to later rounds. In qualifying round one, players seeded 65–96 faced those seeded 97–128. In qualifying round two, the 32 first-round winners played those seeded 33–64. In qualifying round three, the 32 second-round winners played the top 32 seeds. The third-round qualifying matches featuring players seeded 17–32 were played in Sheffield. The third-round qualifying matches featuring the top 16 seeds were held over and played at the main venue in Berlin.

All matches up to and including the quarter‑finals were played as the best of nine frames. The semi‑finals were the best of 11, and the final was a best‑of‑19 frame match played over two sessions.

=== Broadcasters ===
The qualifying matches played in Sheffield were broadcast in the United Kingdom, Germany, Italy, and Austria by Discovery+ and in other European territories by HBO Max. They were broadcast in mainland China by the CBSA‑WPBSA Academy WeChat Channel, the CBSA‑WPBSA Academy Douyin, Huya Live, and Migu. In all other territories (including Ireland) they were streamed by WST Play.

The matches played at the main venue in Berlin were broadcast in the UK and Ireland by TNT Sports and Discovery+. They were broadcast in mainland Europe by Eurosport, with streaming coverage by Discovery+ in Germany, Italy, and Austria and by HBO Max in other European territories. They were broadcast in mainland China by the same broadcasters as the Sheffield qualifying matches, in Hong Kong by Now TV, in Malaysia and Brunei by Astro SuperSport, in Thailand by TrueSports, in Taiwan by Sportcast, and in the Philippines by TAP Sports. In territories where no other coverage was available, the main stage was streamed by WST Play.

=== Prize fund ===
The breakdown of prize money for the event is shown below:

- Winner: £100,000
- Runner-up: £45,000
- Semi-final: £21,000
- Quarter-final: £13,200
- Last 16: £9,000
- Last 32: £5,400
- Last 64: £3,600
- Last 96: £1,000
- Highest break: £5,000
- Total: £550,400

== Summary ==
=== Qualifying rounds (Sheffield) ===
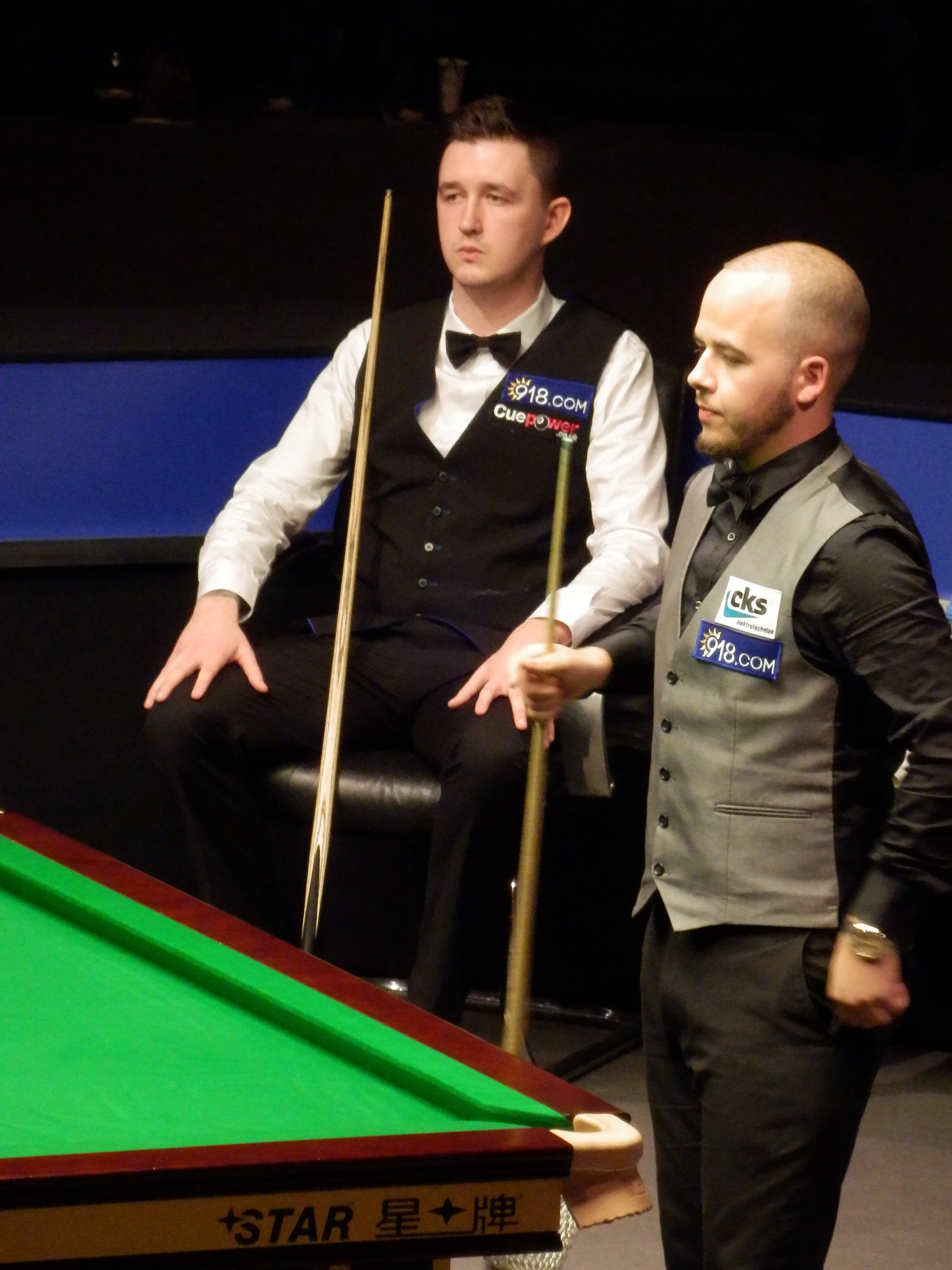
The 2023 World Champion Luca Brecel (pictured, right, at the 2016 event) lost in the third qualifying round to David Gilbert.

In the first qualifying round, Julien Leclercq recorded a whitewash victory over Ashley Hugill, making a highest break of 99, while Robbie McGuigan also whitewashed Mink Nutcharut. Gao Yang made back-to-back century breaks of 111 and 113 in the final two frames of his 5–2 victory over Steven Hallworth, and Marco Fu made a highest break of 114 as he beat Xu Yichen 5–1. Ken Doherty, the 1997 World Champion, trailed Wang Yuchen 2–4 but made breaks of 134 and 83 as he won three consecutive frames for a 5–4 victory. Gong Chenzhi won the last two frames to defeat the reigning World Women's Champion Bai Yulu 5–4.

In the second qualifying round, Anthony McGill defeated 14-year-old Michał Szubarczyk 5–1, and Robert Milkins defeated Dylan Emery 5–2. Chang Bingyu, who had recently reached his maiden ranking final at the 2025 Scottish Open, made breaks of 78, 105, 76, and 124 as he came from 1–2 behind to secure a 5–3 victory over Stan Moody, who also made two centuries in the match. Luca Brecel, the 2023 World Champion, defeated Liam Davies 5–2, and Fu beat Martin O'Donnell in a deciding frame.

In the third qualifying round, two-time champion Ali Carter made breaks of 104 and 71 as he beat Ricky Walden 5–2. David Gilbert produced breaks of 107 and 61 in the last two frames to defeat Brecel 5–4, while Jack Lisowski made a highest break of 96 as he beat Lan Yuhao 5–1. Stuart Bingham made a century of 124 as he whitewashed Doherty, while Elliot Slessor made a highest break of 104 as he whitewashed Liam Highfield. Leclercq advanced with a 5–3 victory over Yuan Sijun, and Gao also advanced after beating Stephen Maguire in a deciding frame. Fu failed to reach the main stage, losing 2–5 to Jak Jones.

=== Main stage (Berlin) ===
==== Held-over qualifiers ====
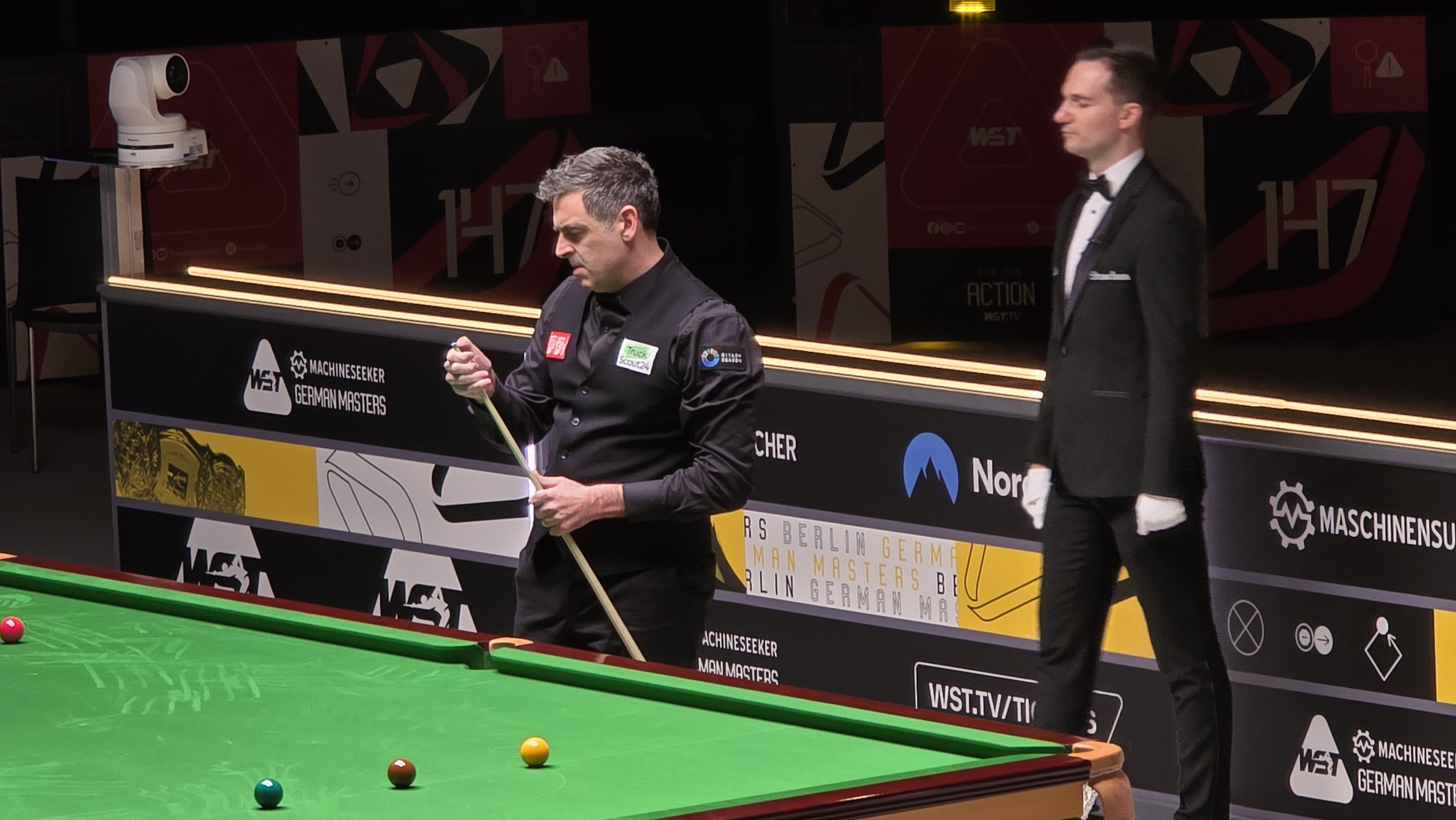
Ronnie O'Sullivan (pictured at the event) played in the tournament for the first time in nine years. He won his held-over qualifier but lost in the last 32 to Ali Carter.

Chang and Wu Yize withdrew, and their respective opponents, Neil Robertson and Jordan Brown, received walkovers to the last 32. The defending champion and recent 2026 Masters winner Kyren Wilson made breaks of 75, 63, 119, and 65 as he defeated Robert Milkins 5–1. Mark Williams beat Sanderson Lam by the same score, and commented afterward that he was undecided about whether to proceed with laser eye surgery. "I'm postponed until March at the moment," he commented. "They will probably ring me back then and I'll postpone again until after the [2026 World Championship]. I just don't know what to do. It was alright in patches tonight. I potted some good long ones and had a couple of breaks in there. I just need to get a few more wins." Ishpreet Singh Chadha recovered from 1–3 behind to defeat Chris Wakelin in a deciding frame, while Shaun Murphy beat Zak Surety 5–2, and Mark Allen advanced with a 5–3 win over Oliver Lines. The previous year's runner-up Barry Hawkins made back-to-back centuries of 132 and 105 in his 5–2 victory over Mark Davis.

Ronnie O'Sullivan featured in the tournament for the first time in nine years, having last appeared at the 2017 edition. He made breaks of 63, 55, and 93 as he defeated the world number 54 Long Zehuang 5–1. "I felt the tables were unbelievably fast," commented O'Sullivan, who had prepared for the event in Ireland. "I just couldn't control the ball. I haven't played on tournament tables that much. You have to hit [shots] differently, you have to strike them more pure, more confidently." Having recently turned 50, he stated that his remaining goal in his professional career was to win an eighth world title. Judd Trump, the world number one, made a highest break of 73 as he whitewashed Cheung Ka Wai. "A lot of times this season I feel like I've been the best player or one of the best going into the semi-finals and the final," said Trump, who had not won a title in over a year. "I've just not got over the line. I've given myself as many opportunities as I do in other seasons, I just haven't been as clinical under the utmost pressure." Zhao Xintong, the reigning World Champion, attempted a maximum break in the last frame of his whitewash victory over Jiang Jun but missed the penultimate red, ending the break on 104. John Higgins, recently runner-up at the 2026 Masters, advanced with a 5–1 victory over Jamie Jones. Scott Donaldson won five consecutive frames to defeat the 15th seed Gary Wilson by the same score.

==== Last 32 ====
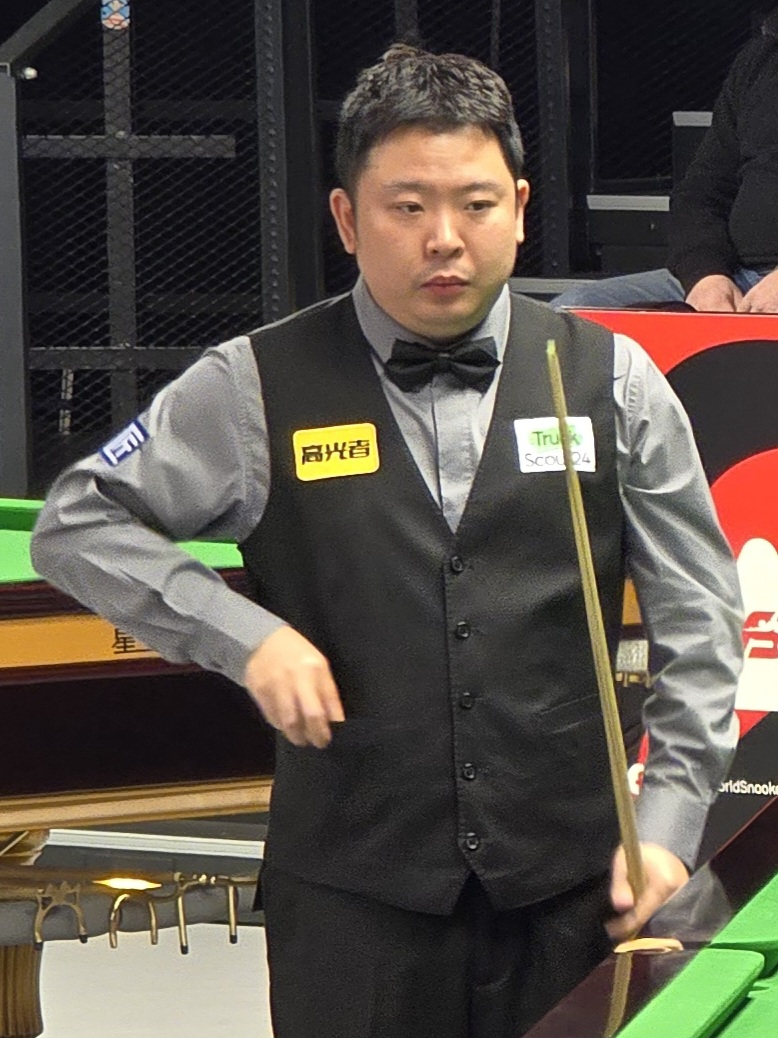
Zhang Anda (pictured in 2025) made his fifth maximum break as he defeated the previous year's runner-up Barry Hawkins.

Kyren Wilson lost the first frame against McGill but then won five consecutive frames with breaks of 65, 99, 52, 56, and 106 for a 5–1 victory. Murphy beat Leclercq by the same score, making breaks of 87, 117, 73, 55, and 103, while Leclercq made a century of 124 in frame three. Chadha, the top-ranked player in India, defeated Slessor 5–3. Zhang Anda made the fifth maximum break of his career in the first frame of his match against Hawkins. It was the record-extending 22nd maximum of the season, the 239th in professional snooker history, and the fourth in the history of the German Masters. Zhang went on to win the match 5–2. "Making a maximum at the German Masters is really special, and doing it in the opening frame makes it even better," Zhang said afterwards. "To be honest, I wasn't really thinking about a maximum in the early part of the break. It only came into my mind later on. I think the crowd already realized what I was trying to do. The atmosphere was fantastic. I really enjoyed that moment." Neil Robertson made three centuries of 108, 100, and 106 as he defeated Pang Junxu, also by a 5–2 scoreline. Jimmy Robertson eliminated Williams 5–3.

Carter made a century of 128 in the opening frame against O'Sullivan and went on to take a 3–0 lead. O'Sullivan tied the scores at 3–3, but Carter won the last two frames for a 5–3 victory. It was only the second time Carter had beaten O'Sullivan in their 22 professional meetings. Speaking afterwards about his longstanding rivalry with O'Sullivan, Carter said: "We are fine now. There is no animosity at all. It is all heat of the moment stuff between two sportsmen and he is the best snooker player of all time. It is great to be on the table with him and competing. Getting the odd win over him is a feather in my cap." Trump produced three century breaks of 102, 102, and 127 as he beat Ryan Day 5–0, his second consecutive whitewash win in the tournament. Day made a highest break of just 14 in the match. Higgins defeated Zhou Yuelong 5–3, Bingham beat Donaldson 5–2, and Xiao Guodong advanced with a 5–1 win over Lisowski. Si Jiahui defeated Gilbert in a deciding frame. Tom Ford came from 1–3 down against Zhao to win four consecutive frames, defeating the World Champion 5–3. Mark Selby lost the first three frames to Xu Si but recovered to win four in a row, taking a 4–3 lead. Xu won the last two frames for a 5–4 victory.

==== Last 16 ====
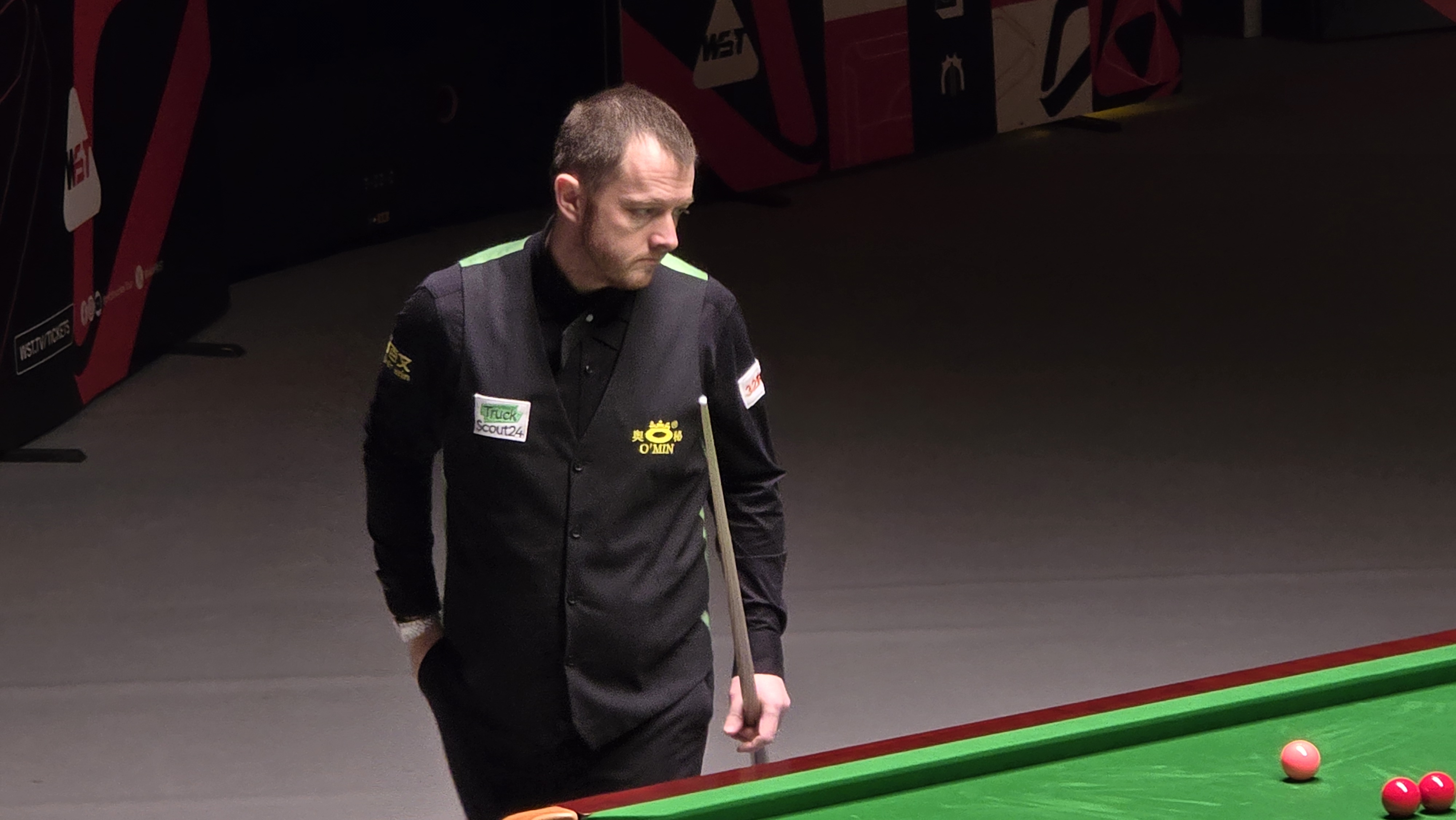
Mark Allen (pictured at the event) was whitewashed in the last 16 by Shaun Murphy.

Murphy produced breaks including 125, 74, 75, and 62 as he whitewashed Allen, saying afterwards that: "5–0 wins over Mark Allen don't come along every day. It was a really good match, certainly from my point of view. I thought the conditions caught us both out. It was the quickest table I've ever played on in my life. Controlling the cue ball isn't always easy. Mark missed a few shots and that gave me the chance to get used to the speed quicker." Murphy also commented on his recent first-round defeat to Wu Yize at the 2026 Masters, where he had been the defending champion. "I was very disappointed after the Masters, not just because of the loss but how I played," he stated. "It was totally inexplicable. My preparation was second to none and I worked very hard on my game. I've come here this week feeling the same as I did for [the Masters] but thankfully I've strung a few wins together."

The defending champion Wilson lost the first two frames against Zhang but then won five in a row for a 5–2 victory. Wilson, who needed to improve his standing on the one-year ranking list to defend his title at the 2026 Players Championship, commented: "I'm definitely chasing the points. That is for sure. There is a little bit of pressure on me this week. I'm coping well so far." Neil Robertson and Carter advanced with whitewash victories over Chadha and Xu respectively. Jimmy Robertson defeated Jak Jones, Bingham beat Ford, and Trump defeated Si, all by 5–2 scorelines. Xiao and Higgins played a lengthy evening match that finished after midnight, with Xiao eventually securing a 5–3 win.

==== Quarter-finals ====
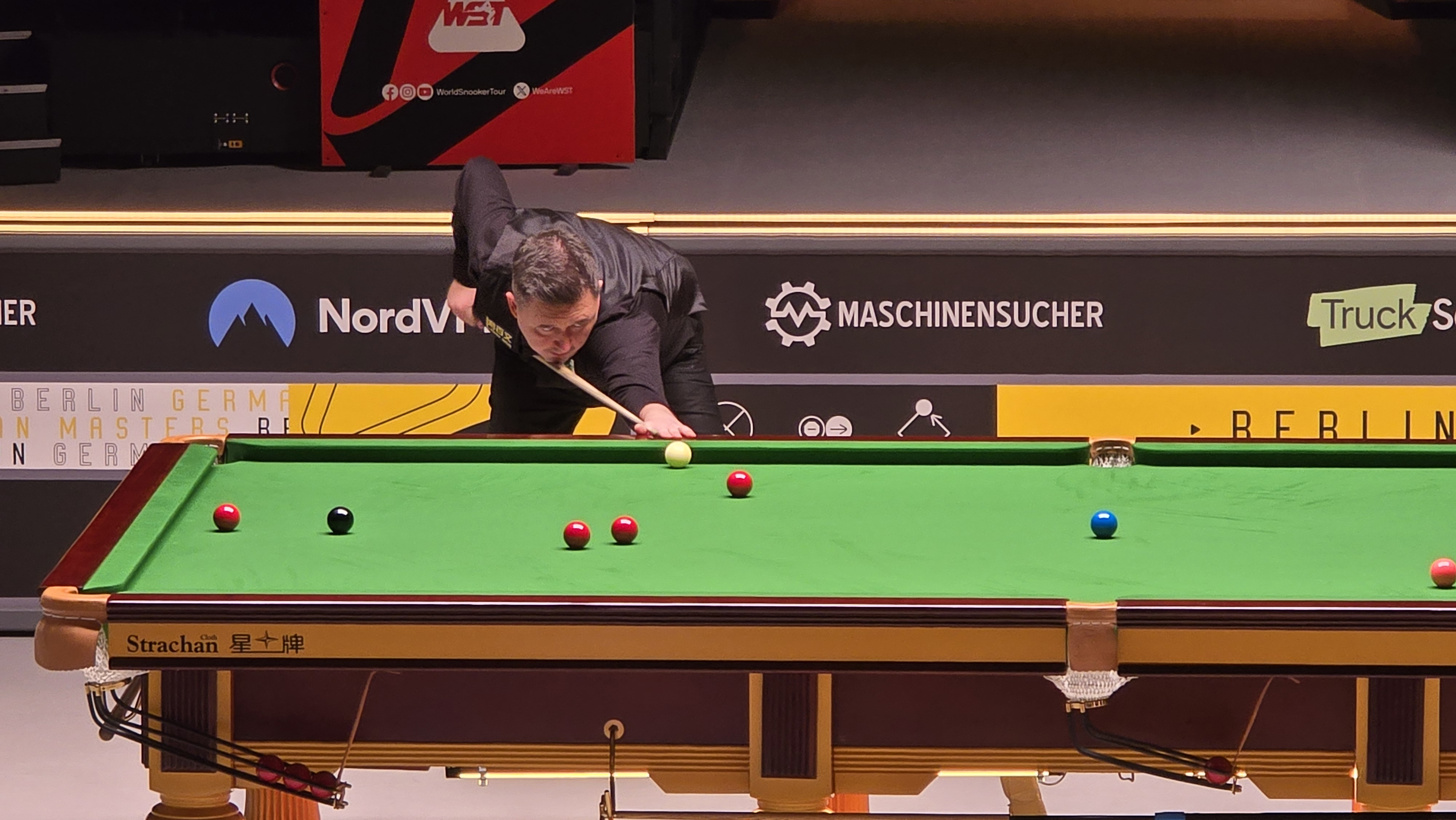
The defending champion Kyren Wilson (pictured at the event) lost in the quarter-finals to Shaun Murphy.

Facing the defending champion Wilson, Murphy made breaks of 78, 101, 68, and 58 as he won the first four frames. Wilson produced a total clearance of 139 to take frame five, but Murphy won frame six on the colours to secure a 5–1 victory. "These results have been totally unexpected," Murphy said afterwards. "Whether I win 5–4 on the black or 5–0, it doesn't matter to me. I'm just happy to still be in this great tournament. It is one of the few events which I haven't won during my career. It would mean a lot to go on and lift the trophy on Sunday night. I've come here on a bit of a mission." Carter, who had won the tournament in 2013 and 2023 and been runner-up in 2017, made a highest break of 137 as he also secured a 5–1 victory over Bingham.

Trump made breaks of 65 and 107 as he won the first two frames against Xiao, who responded with breaks of 104 and 62 to tie the scores at 2–2 at the mid-session interval. Xiao won frame five, but Trump then won three consecutive frames with breaks of 105, 53, and 69 to secure a 5–3 victory. "It was a tough game tonight and I didn't feel I did a lot wrong," Trump said afterwards. "We both played to a good standard. I feel a bit tired now as it took a lot of concentration out there to get the job done." In the last quarter-final, Neil Robertson defeated Jimmy Robertson 5–1. Looking ahead to his semi-final match against Murphy, Robertson said: "All of the top players have their own kind of aura around the table. Each one is just as imposing as the other. I like to see that. It spurs me on to play better. When you see the top players strutting round the table, it inspires you to play really well too. We are both very attacking players and great long potters. The key is maybe who can pot great balls to get in or the safety."

==== Semi-finals ====
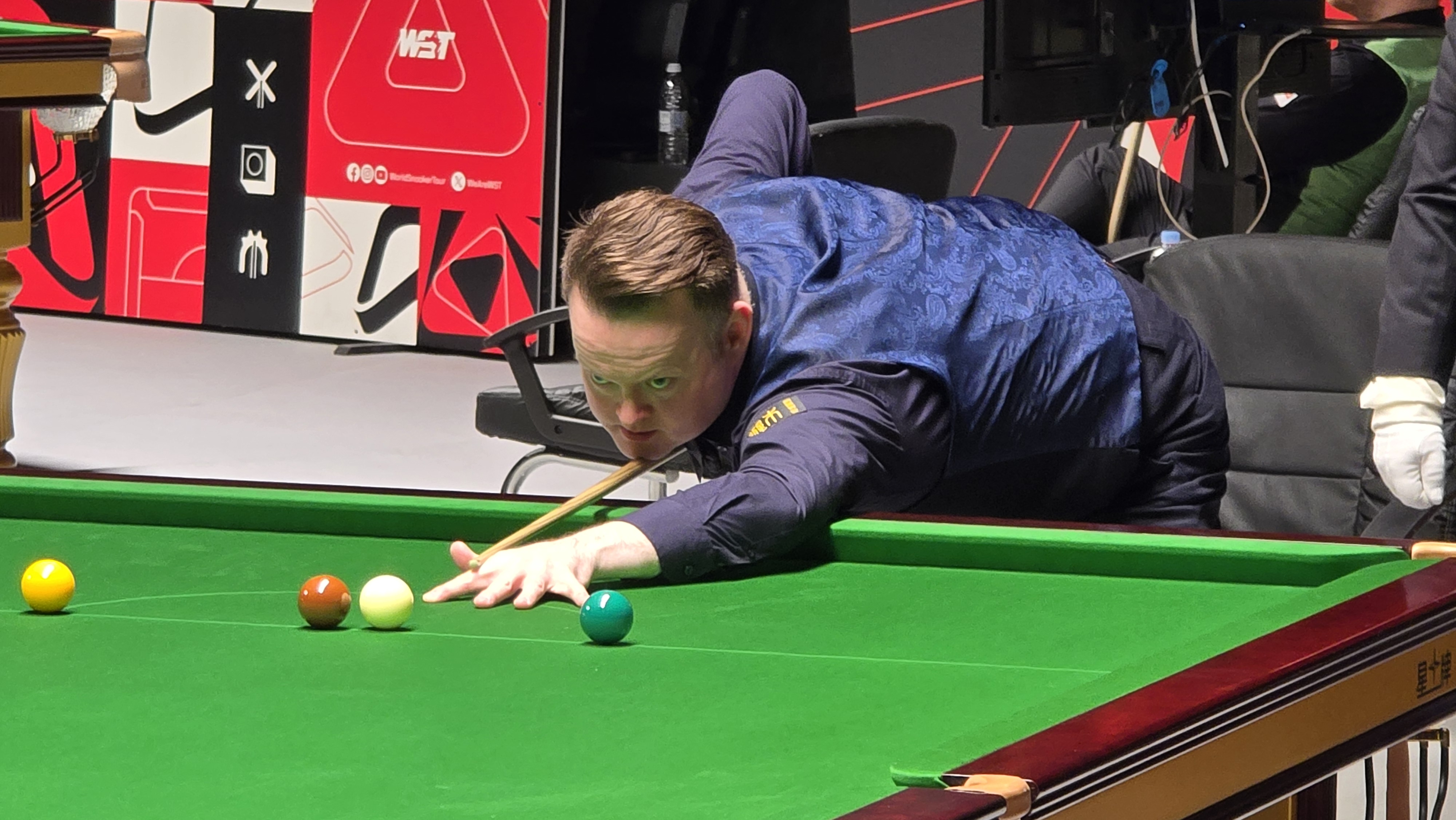
Shaun Murphy (pictured at the event ) defeated Neil Robertson to reach his second German Masters final.

Facing Neil Robertson in the first semi-final, Murphy made three centuries in the first four frames—a 122 in the opener, followed by back-to-back centuries of 102 and 106 in frames three and four—as he took a 3–1 lead at the mid-session interval. Murphy won a further three frames after the interval, making breaks including 51 and 56 as he completed a 6–1 victory. He commented afterwards: "I think whenever you go up against one of the game's legends, which for me Neil [Robertson] is one of, it makes things very straightforward. You know you need to play your best. For a lot of that match I was close to my best. I had a bit of luck at the right moments and that always helps. I'm delighted to have won."

Playing Carter in the second semi-final, Trump made breaks including 52, 67, and 87 as he won all four frames before the mid-session interval. Carter won frames five and six, but Trump took frames seven and eight to secure a 6–2 victory. "[Carter] missed a couple early on and I think in the end missed one too many and I was able to punish him and put him under pressure," said Trump afterwards. "He always puts up a fight and tries to the very end. He made it difficult at 4–2, but I managed to nick the last two." Trump added: "It is an incredible arena so whenever you play in a semi-final or a final here it is a real privilege to be out there. It is always nice to perform well in that environment."

==== Final ====
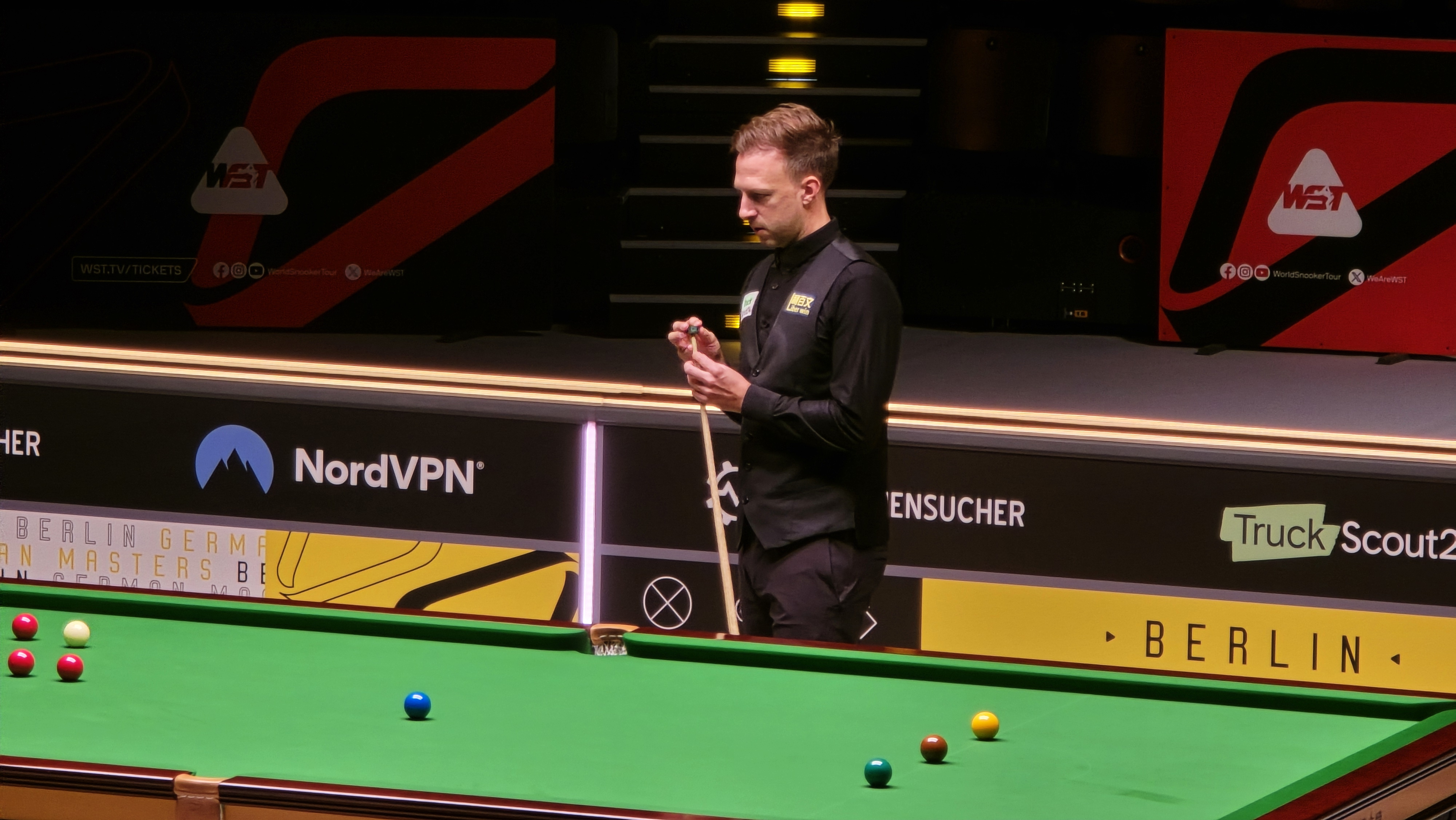
Judd Trump (pictured at the event) defeated Shaun Murphy 10–4 in the final to win his fourth German Masters title and 31st ranking title.

The final took place on 1 February as the best of 19 frames, played over two sessions, between the third seed Trump and the eighth seed Murphy. Trump contested his fifth German Masters final, having previously won the title in 2020, 2021, and 2024 and been runner-up in 2014. Murphy reached the final for a second time, having been runner-up in 2015. Trump had won eight of the previous nine professional meetings between the two players.

Trump won the first two frames with breaks of 101 and 71, but Murphy responded with breaks of 103 and 58 to tie the scores at 2–2 at the mid-session interval. Trump then made breaks including 62 and 64 as he won three consecutive frames to move 5–2 ahead. Murphy produced a century of 117 to win frame eight, leaving Trump with a 5–3 advantage after the first session. When play resumed for the evening session, Trump came from 60 points behind to win frame nine on the last black. He also won frame 10 on the last black, took frame 11 with a 68 break, and won frame 12 on the last pink to lead 9–3. Murphy recovered from 51 points behind to take frame 13 on the last black, but Trump won the next frame to complete a 10–4 victory. It was Trump's record-extending fourth German Masters title, the 31st ranking title of his career, and his first professional title since winning the 2024 UK Championship 14 months earlier.

"It is incredible to win such a special event," Trump said after the final. "Every time I come here, I'm very happy to have the chance to play in front of that crowd. There are such special memories walking out here for the final. Today was no different. I played a very solid game." Commenting on his 14-month wait for a title, he stated: "The time without winning tournaments wasn't difficult. It was just about being in the right mental state to win when the next chance came around. It was important not to get too down on myself and take the positives that I was putting myself in position to win." Murphy thanked the audience, calling them "unbelievably supportive." He added: "It has been an incredible week for me here in Berlin... I'll come back next year and try again."

== Main draw ==
The results of the main draw are shown below. Numbers in parentheses after the players' names denote the top 32 seeded players. Players in bold denote match winners.

**Last 32**; Best of 9 frames
**Kyren Wilson (ENG) (1)**	**5**
Anthony McGill (SCO)	1
Barry Hawkins (ENG) (13)	2
**Zhang Anda (CHN) (22)**	**5**
Gao Yang (CHN)	3
**Mark Allen (NIR) (10)**	**5**
Julien Leclercq (BEL)	1
**Shaun Murphy (ENG) (8)**	**5**
Mark Williams (WAL) (5)	3
**Jimmy Robertson (ENG)**	**5**
Jordan Brown (NIR)	0
**Jak Jones (WAL) (18)**	**5**
Elliot Slessor (ENG) (20)	3
**Ishpreet Singh Chadha (IND)**	**5**
Pang Junxu (CHN) (26)	2
**Neil Robertson (AUS) (4)**	**5**
**Judd Trump (ENG) (3)**	**5**
Ryan Day (WAL)	0
**Si Jiahui (CHN) (14)**	**5**
David Gilbert (ENG) (23)	4
Jack Lisowski (ENG) (21)	1
**Xiao Guodong (CHN) (11)**	**5**
Zhou Yuelong (CHN) (28)	3
**John Higgins (SCO) (6)**	**5**
Mark Selby (ENG) (7)	4
**Xu Si (CHN)**	**5**
Ronnie O'Sullivan (ENG) (9)	3
**Ali Carter (ENG) (19)**	**5**
**Stuart Bingham (ENG) (17)**	**5**
Scott Donaldson (SCO)	2
**Tom Ford (ENG) (25)**	**5**
Zhao Xintong (CHN) (2)	3

**Last 16**; Best of 9 frames
**(England) Kyren Wilson (1)**	**5**
(China) Zhang Anda (22)	2
(Northern Ireland) Mark Allen (10)	0
**(England) Shaun Murphy (8)**	**5**
**(England) Jimmy Robertson**	**5**
(Wales) Jak Jones (18)	2
(India) Ishpreet Singh Chadha	0
**(Australia) Neil Robertson (4)**	**5**
**(England) Judd Trump (3)**	**5**
(China) Si Jiahui (14)	2
**(China) Xiao Guodong (11)**	**5**
(Scotland) John Higgins (6)	3
(China) Xu Si	0
**(England) Ali Carter (19)**	**5**
**(England) Stuart Bingham (17)**	**5**
(England) Tom Ford (25)	2

**Quarter-finals**; Best of 9 frames
(England) Kyren Wilson (1)	1
**(England) Shaun Murphy (8)**	**5**
(England) Jimmy Robertson	1
**(Australia) Neil Robertson (4)**	**5**
**(England) Judd Trump (3)**	**5**
(China) Xiao Guodong (11)	3
**(England) Ali Carter (19)**	**5**
(England) Stuart Bingham (17)	1

**Semi-finals**; Best of 11 frames
**(England) Shaun Murphy (8)**	**6**
(Australia) Neil Robertson (4)	1
**(England) Judd Trump (3)**	**6**
(England) Ali Carter (19)	2

**Final**; Best of 19 frames
(England) Shaun Murphy (8)	4
**(England) Judd Trump (3)**	**10**

=== Final: frame scores ===
Final: Best of 19 frames. Referee: Marcel Eckardt; Tempodrom, Berlin, Germany, 1 February 2026
Shaun Murphy (8); England	4–**10**	**Judd Trump** (3); England
Afternoon: 0–**101** (101), 1–**97**, **103**–4 (103), **92**–7, 10–**71**, 9–**102**, 16–**77**, **118**–10 (117); Evening: 60–**64**, 42–**56**, 13–**68**, 57–**71**, **69**–65, 11–**66**
(frame 8) **117**	Highest break	101 (frame 1)
**2**	Century breaks	1

== Qualifying rounds ==
The results of the qualifying rounds are shown below. Numbers in parentheses after the players' names denote the players' seeding, an "a" indicates amateur players who were not on the main World Snooker Tour, and players in bold denote match winners.

=== Rounds 1 and 2 ===
**Round 1 (Last 128)**; Best of 9 frames
**Dylan Emery (WAL) (91)**	**5**
Florian Nüßle (AUT) (124)	3
**Michał Szubarczyk (POL) (95)**	**5**
Kreishh Gurbaxani (IND) (120)	3
Antoni Kowalski (POL) (72)	2
**Liam Graham (SCO) (104)**	**5**
Amir Sarkhosh (IRN) (77)	1
**Mahmoud El Hareedy (EGY) (125)**	**5**
Steven Hallworth (ENG) (90)	2
**Gao Yang (CHN) (105)**	**5**
**Robbie McGuigan (NIR) (87)**	**5**
Mink Nutcharut (THA) (116)	0
**Julien Leclercq (BEL) (76)**	**5**
Ashley Hugill (ENG) (a)	0
**Iulian Boiko (UKR) (80)**	**5**
Hatem Yassen (EGY) (110)	1
**Huang Jiahao (CHN) (83)**	**5**
Jimmy White (ENG) (121)	3
**Artemijs Žižins (LVA) (75)**	**5**
Liu Wenwei (CHN) (108)	2
**Bulcsú Révész (HUN) (82)**	**5**
Reanne Evans (ENG) (97)	0
**Marco Fu (HKG) (92)**	**5**
Xu Yichen (CHN) (109)	1
**Liam Highfield (ENG) (89)**	**5**
Fergal Quinn (NIR) (122)	0
**Louis Heathcote (ENG) (71)**	**5**
Chatchapong Nasa (THA) (115)	3
**Farakh Ajaib (PAK) (78)**	**5**
Yao Pengcheng (CHN) (103)	4
**Chang Bingyu (CHN) (68)**	**5**
Oliver Brown (ENG) (113)	1

**Round 2 (Last 96)**; Best of 9 frames
**Robert Milkins (ENG) (57)**	**5**
Dylan Emery (WAL) (91)	2
**Anthony McGill (SCO) (47)**	**5**
Michał Szubarczyk (POL) (95)	1
**Mark Davis (ENG) (63)**	**5**
Liam Graham (SCO) (104)	2
**Matthew Stevens (WAL) (48)**	**5**
Mahmoud El Hareedy (EGY) (125)	1
He Guoqiang (CHN) (45)	3
**Gao Yang (CHN) (105)**	**5**
**Oliver Lines (ENG) (59)**	**5**
Robbie McGuigan (NIR) (87)	2
Matthew Selt (ENG) (37)	2
**Julien Leclercq (BEL) (76)**	**5**
**Zak Surety (ENG) (51)**	**5**
Iulian Boiko (UKR) (80)	3
**Sanderson Lam (ENG) (61)**	**5**
Huang Jiahao (CHN) (83)	3
**Jimmy Robertson (ENG) (33)**	**5**
Artemijs Žižins (LVA) (75)	2
**Jordan Brown (NIR) (62)**	**5**
Bulcsú Révész (HUN) (82)	3
Martin O'Donnell (ENG) (43)	4
**Marco Fu (HKG) (92)**	**5**
Aaron Hill (IRL) (41)	3
**Liam Highfield (ENG) (89)**	**5**
**Ishpreet Singh Chadha (IND) (64)**	**5**
Louis Heathcote (ENG) (71)	4
**Thepchaiya Un-Nooh (THA) (40)**	**5**
Farakh Ajaib (PAK) (78)	3
Stan Moody (ENG) (49)	3
**Chang Bingyu (CHN) (68)**	**5**

**Round 1 (Last 128)**; Best of 9 frames
**Cheung Ka Wai (HKG) (85)**	**5**
Ng On-yee (HKG) (118)	1
**Ben Mertens (BEL) (65)**	**5**
Alexander Ursenbacher (SUI) (119)	1
Mitchell Mann (ENG) (79)	2
**Mohammed Shehab (UAE) (117)**	**5**
**Liam Davies (WAL) (74)**	**5**
Leone Crowley (IRL) (112)	2
Chris Totten (SCO) (96)	3
**Lan Yuhao (CHN) (101)**	**5**
**Allan Taylor (ENG) (73)**	**5**
Mateusz Baranowski (POL) (102)	3
Duane Jones (WAL) (67)	1
**Ross Muir (SCO) (106)**	**5**
Haydon Pinhey (ENG) (86)	4
**Patrick Whelan (ENG) (a)**	**5**
**Gong Chenzhi (CHN) (66)**	**5**
Bai Yulu (CHN) (100)	4
David Grace (ENG) (94)	w/d
**Ian Burns** (ENG) (98)	**w/o**
Haris Tahir (PAK) (84)	4
**Zhao Hanyang (CHN) (107)**	**5**
**Liam Pullen (ENG) (81)**	**5**
Jonas Luz (BRA) (111)	1
Wang Yuchen (HKG) (69)	4
**Ken Doherty (IRL) (99)**	**5**
**Sunny Akani (THA) (70)**	**5**
Sahil Nayyar (CAN) (123)	3
**Sam Craigie (ENG) (88)**	**5**
Connor Benzey (ENG) (114)	0
**Jiang Jun (CHN) (93)**	**5**
Umut Dikme (GER) (a)	1

**Round 2 (Last 96)**; Best of 9 frames
David Lilley (ENG) (52)	4
**Cheung Ka Wai (HKG) (85)**	**5**
**Ryan Day (WAL) (35)**	**5**
Ben Mertens (BEL) (65)	2
**Fan Zhengyi (CHN) (55)**	**5**
Mohammed Shehab (UAE) (117)	1
**Luca Brecel (BEL) (42)**	**5**
Liam Davies (WAL) (74)	2
Ben Woollaston (ENG) (36)	1
**Lan Yuhao (CHN) (101)**	**5**
**Robbie Williams (ENG) (54)**	**5**
Allan Taylor (ENG) (73)	3
**Daniel Wells (WAL) (39)**	**5**
Ross Muir (SCO) (106)	3
**Jamie Jones (WAL) (58)**	**5**
Patrick Whelan (ENG) (a)	2
**Liu Hongyu (CHN) (56)**	**5**
Gong Chenzhi (CHN) (66)	0
**Xu Si (CHN) (38)**	**5**
Ian Burns (ENG) (98)	1
**Long Zehuang (CHN) (53)**	**5**
Zhao Hanyang (CHN) (107)	4
**Ricky Walden (ENG) (44)**	**5**
Liam Pullen (ENG) (81)	1
Lyu Haotian (CHN) (46)	4
**Ken Doherty (IRL) (99)**	**5**
**Scott Donaldson (SCO) (50)**	**5**
Sunny Akani (THA) (70)	2
**Noppon Saengkham (THA) (34)**	**5**
Sam Craigie (ENG) (88)	3
Michael Holt (ENG) (60)	2
**Jiang Jun (CHN) (93)**	**5**

Note: w/d=withdrawn; w/o=walkover

=== Round 3 (last-64) ===
==== Berlin (held-over) ====
- **Kyren Wilson** (ENG) (1) **5**–1 Robert Milkins (ENG) (57)
- **Barry Hawkins** (ENG) (13) **5**–2 Mark Davis (ENG) (63)
- **Mark Allen** (NIR) (10) **5**–3 Oliver Lines (ENG) (59)
- **Shaun Murphy** (ENG) (8) **5**–2 Zak Surety (ENG) (51)
- **Mark Williams** (WAL) (5) **5**–1 Sanderson Lam (ENG) (61)
- Wu Yize (CHN) (12) w/d – **w/o** **Jordan Brown** (NIR) (62)
- Chris Wakelin (ENG) (16) 4–**5** **Ishpreet Singh Chadha** (IND) (64)
- **Neil Robertson** (AUS) (4) **w/o** – w/d Chang Bingyu (CHN) (68)
- **Judd Trump** (ENG) (3) **5**–0 Cheung Ka Wai (HKG) (85)
- **Si Jiahui** (CHN) (14) **5**–2 Fan Zhengyi (CHN) (55)
- **Xiao Guodong** (CHN) (11) **5**–2 Robbie Williams (ENG) (54)
- **John Higgins** (SCO) (6) **5**–1 Jamie Jones (WAL) (58)
- **Mark Selby** (ENG) (7) **5**–1 Liu Hongyu (CHN) (56)
- **Ronnie O'Sullivan** (ENG) (9) **5**–1 Long Zehuang (CHN) (53)
- Gary Wilson (ENG) (15) 1–**5** **Scott Donaldson** (SCO) (50)
- **Zhao Xintong** (CHN) (2) **5**–0 Jiang Jun (CHN) (93)

==== Sheffield ====
- **Pang Junxu** (CHN) (26) **5**–3 Thepchaiya Un-Nooh (THA) (40)
- **Jak Jones** (WAL) (18) **5**–2 Marco Fu (HKG) (92)
- Yuan Sijun (CHN) (30) 3–**5** **Julien Leclercq** (BEL) (76)
- **Zhang Anda** (CHN) (22) **5**–0 Matthew Stevens (WAL) (48)
- Jackson Page (WAL) (32) 0–**5** **Jimmy Robertson** (ENG) (33)
- Stephen Maguire (SCO) (24) 4–**5** **Gao Yang** (CHN) (105)
- Hossein Vafaei (IRN) (31) 3–**5** **Anthony McGill** (SCO) (47)
- **Elliot Slessor** (ENG) (20) **5**–0 Liam Highfield (ENG) (89)
- Joe O'Connor (ENG) (27) 3–**5** **Ryan Day** (WAL) (35)
- **Zhou Yuelong** (CHN) (28) **5**–4 Daniel Wells (WAL) (39)
- **Stuart Bingham** (ENG) (17) **5**–0 Ken Doherty (IRL) (99)
- **Jack Lisowski** (ENG) (21) **5**–1 Lan Yuhao (CHN) (101)
- Lei Peifan (CHN) (29) 2–**5** **Xu Si** (CHN) (38)
- **David Gilbert** (ENG) (23) **5**–4 Luca Brecel (BEL) (42)
- **Ali Carter** (ENG) (19) **5**–2 Ricky Walden (ENG) (44)
- **Tom Ford** (ENG) (25) **5**–1 Noppon Saengkham (THA) (34)

Note: w/d=withdrawn; w/o=walkover

== Century breaks ==
=== Main stage centuries ===
A total of 51 century breaks were made during the main stage of the tournament in Berlin.

- 147 – Zhang Anda
- 141, 135, 110, 109, 106, 104 – Xiao Guodong
- 139, 119, 106 – Kyren Wilson
- 137, 128 – Ali Carter
- 133, 125, 122, 117, 117, 106, 103, 103, 102, 101 – Shaun Murphy
- 132, 105 – Barry Hawkins
- 131, 105 – Zhou Yuelong
- 128, 124, 108, 106, 100 – Neil Robertson
- 127, 107, 105, 102, 102, 101 – Judd Trump
- 125, 104 – Zhao Xintong
- 124, 115 – Mark Selby
- 124 – Julien Leclercq
- 123, 101 – Jimmy Robertson
- 121 – Stuart Bingham
- 116, 100 – Jak Jones
- 114 – Gao Yang
- 109 – Si Jiahui
- 101 – David Gilbert
- 101 – Robbie Williams

=== Qualifying stage centuries ===
A total of 58 century breaks were made during the qualifying stage of the tournament in Sheffield.

- 137, 112, 104 – Cheung Ka Wai
- 137 – Joe O'Connor
- 136, 130 – Ross Muir
- 136 – Patrick Whelan
- 134, 118 – Ricky Walden
- 134, 104 – Ben Mertens
- 134 – Ken Doherty
- 134 – Jak Jones
- 130, 117 – Thepchaiya Un-Nooh
- 128, 119 – Jimmy Robertson
- 128, 110 – Julien Leclercq
- 125, 124, 105 – Chang Bingyu
- 125, 109 – Sam Craigie
- 124 – Stuart Bingham
- 124 – Anthony McGill
- 123, 107 – Lei Peifan
- 122, 120, 113, 111, 101 – Gao Yang
- 121 – Oliver Lines
- 116 – Mahmoud El Hareedy
- 116 – Noppon Saengkham
- 114 – Marco Fu
- 111 – Liu Hongyu
- 110, 101 – Stan Moody
- 109 – Haydon Pinhey
- 109 – Wang Yuchen
- 108 – Tom Ford
- 107 – David Gilbert
- 107 – Yuan Sijun
- 106 – Ryan Day
- 106 – Xu Si
- 104 – Ali Carter
- 104 – Elliot Slessor
- 104 – Chris Totten
- 102 – Matthew Stevens
- 102 – Artemijs Žižins
- 101 – Ian Burns
- 101 – Aaron Hill
- 101 – Stephen Maguire
- 100 – Dylan Emery
- 100 – Jamie Jones
- 100 – Liam Pullen
