= 2025 Scottish Open (snooker) =

Snooker tournament

2025 BetVictor Scottish Open
- Part of the Home Nations Series

Tournament information
- Dates: 15–21 December 2025
- Venue: Meadowbank Sports Centre
- City: Edinburgh
- Country: Scotland
- Organisation: World Snooker Tour
- Format: Ranking event
- Total prize fund: £550,400
- Winner's share: £100,000
- Highest break: Zhao Xintong (CHN) (146)

Final
- Champion: Chris Wakelin (ENG)
- Runner-up: Chang Bingyu (CHN)
- Score: 9–2

The 2025 Scottish Open (officially the 2025 BetVictor Scottish Open) was a professional snooker tournament that took place from 15 to 21 December 2025 at the Meadowbank Sports Centre in Edinburgh, Scotland. Qualifying took place from 14 to 17 October at the Robin Park Leisure Centre in Wigan, England. The 10th consecutive edition of the tournament since it was revived in 2016, it was the 11th ranking event of the 2025–26 snooker season, following the 2025 Snooker Shoot Out and preceding the 2026 German Masters. It was the third of four tournaments in the season's Home Nations Series, following the 2025 English Open and the 2025 Northern Ireland Open and preceding the 2026 Welsh Open. The tournament was broadcast by TNT Sports in the United Kingdom and Ireland, by Eurosport in mainland Europe, by local channels in China and elsewhere in Asia, and by WST Play in all other territories. The winner received £100,000 from a total prize fund of £550,400.

Lei Peifan was the defending champion, having defeated Wu Yize 9–5 in the 2024 final, but he lost 3–4 to Yuan Sijun in the last 32. The final was contested between the world number 17 Chris Wakelin and the world number 70 Chang Bingyu, who reached his maiden ranking final. Wakelin won eight consecutive frames to defeat Chang 9–2, securing his first Scottish Open title and second ranking title. The tournament produced 67 century breaks, 18 in the qualifiers in Wigan and 49 at the main stage in Edinburgh, of which the highest was a 146 by Zhao Xintong in his second-round match with Joe O'Connor. The final was the last professional match officiated by Leo Scullion, who retired from refereeing after 26 years on the professional circuit.

== Overview ==
The tournament originated as the non-ranking 1981 International Open, staged at the Assembly Rooms in Derby, England. Steve Davis won the event, defeating Dennis Taylor 9–0 in the final. The tournament became a ranking event the following year, the first event after the World Snooker Championship to gain ranking status. Staged annually under various names (with the exception of the years from 1990–92, when it was not held), the tournament moved to Scotland in 1997 and was first branded as the Scottish Open in 1998. It was discontinued after the 2004 edition, apart from one staging in 2012 as a minor-ranking tournament. The tournament was restored to the calendar as a full ranking event in 2016 as part of the newly created Home Nations Series. Marco Fu won the 2016 edition, recovering from 1–4 behind to beat John Higgins 9–4 in the final; he was presented with the newly named Stephen Hendry Trophy by the seven-time World Champion personally.

The 2025 edition of the tournament—the 10th consecutive staging since its 2016 revival—took place from 15 to 21 December at the Meadowbank Sports Centre in Edinburgh, Scotland. Qualifying took place from 14 to 17 October at the Robin Park Leisure Centre in Wigan, England. It was the 11th ranking event of the 2025–26 snooker season, following the 2025 Snooker Shoot Out and preceding the 2026 German Masters. It was also the third of four tournaments in the season's Home Nations Series, following the 2025 English Open and the 2025 Northern Ireland Open and preceding the 2026 Welsh Open. The top 32 players on the one-year ranking list following the tournament qualified for the 2026 World Grand Prix in Hong Kong. Lei Peifan was the defending champion, having defeated Wu Yize 9–5 in the 2024 final to win his maiden ranking title.

=== Format ===
The tournament used a tiered format first implemented for the Home Nations Series in the 2024–25 snooker season. In the first qualifying round, players seeded 65–96 faced those seeded 97 and under, including selected amateurs. In the second qualifying round, the 32 winners from the first qualifying round faced players seeded 33–64. At the last-64 stage, the 32 winners from the second qualifying round faced the top 32 seeds. All matches were played as best of 7 frames until the quarter-finals, which were the best of 9. The semi-finals were the best of 11, and the final was a best-of-17-frame match played over two sessions.

A number of prominent players were absent from the tournament. Judd Trump, Ronnie O'Sullivan, and Ding Junhui opted not to enter. Mark Williams, Jak Jones, Neil Robertson, and Robert Milkins all withdrew prior to the main stage, as a result of which their respective opponents—Ben Mertens, Matthew Stevens, He Guoqiang, and Zhao Xintong—all received walkovers to the last 32.

=== Broadcasters ===
The qualifying rounds were broadcast by Discovery+ in the UK, Germany, Austria, and Italy; by HBO Max in other European territories; by Huya Live, Migu, the CBSA‑WPBSA Academy WeChat Channel and the CBSA‑WPBSA Academy Douyin in China; and by WST Play in all other territories.

The main stage was broadcast in the United Kingdom and Ireland by TNT Sports, Discovery+, and DMAX. It was broadcast in mainland Europe by Eurosport, with streaming coverage on Discovery+ in Germany, Italy, and Austria and on HBO Max in other European territories. It was broadcast in mainland China by the same broadcasters as the qualifying rounds, in Hong Kong by Now TV, in Malaysia and Brunei by Astro SuperSport, in Thailand by True Sports, in Taiwan by Sportcast, and in the Philippines by TAP Sports. In territories where no other coverage was available, the tournament was streamed via WST Play.

=== Prize fund ===
The prize fund for the tournament is detailed below. In addition, the player who won the most cumulative prize money across the season's four Home Nations Series events received a bonus of £150,000.

- Winner: £100,000
- Runner-up: £45,000
- Semi-final: £21,000
- Quarter-final: £13,200
- Last 16: £9,000
- Last 32: £5,400
- Last 64: £3,600
- Last 96: £1,000
- Highest break: £5,000
- Total: £550,400

== Summary ==
=== First qualifying round ===
Julien Leclercq made breaks of 104, 122, 74, and 68 as he whitewashed amateur player Umut Dikme in a match that lasted only 59 minutes. Liam Highfield also whitewashed 14-year-old Michał Szubarczyk, making a century break of 131 and three other half-centuries in the match. Sam Craigie, who had missed the previous season due to injury, made a century of 136 during his 4–1 win over Florian Nüßle. Two female players were whitewashed in the first qualifying round as Haydon Pinhey beat Mink Nutcharut, the number one ranked player on the women's tour, and Jiang Jun beat Reanne Evans, a 12-time World Women's Champion. However, Bai Yulu, the reigning World Women's Champion, won her third professional match of the season as she whitewashed Kreishh Gurbaxani. Liam Pullen, who had recently reached his first ranking quarter-final at the 2025 Xi'an Grand Prix, progressed with a 4–1 win over Farakh Ajaib, while Alexander Ursenbacher defeated Bulcsú Révész by the same score.

=== Second qualifying round ===
Anthony McGill, recently a finalist at the 2025 British Open, made breaks of 85, 54, 89, and 79 during his 4–1 win over Liam Davies. Craigie beat Jamie Jones by the same score, and Ben Mertens defeated Leclercq 4–2. Ben Woollaston made a 91 break in the deciding frame to beat Highfield, and Amir Sarkhosh produced three half-century breaks as he defeated Jordan Brown 4–1. Pullen also made three half-century breaks as he whitewashed Daniel Wells, a recent semi-finalist at the 2025 Xi'an Grand Prix. Thepchaiya Un-Nooh made a highest break of 144 as he defeated Chatchapong Nasa 4–1. Robbie Williams whitewashed Bai, and Antoni Kowalski defeated David Lilley 4–2. Robert Milkins lost the first three frames against Iulian Boiko but made breaks of 66, 59, and 104 as he won four frames in a row for a 4–3 victory. The 2023 World Champion Luca Brecel failed to appear for his qualifying match, and his opponent Steven Hallworth received a walkover.

=== Round one (last 64) ===
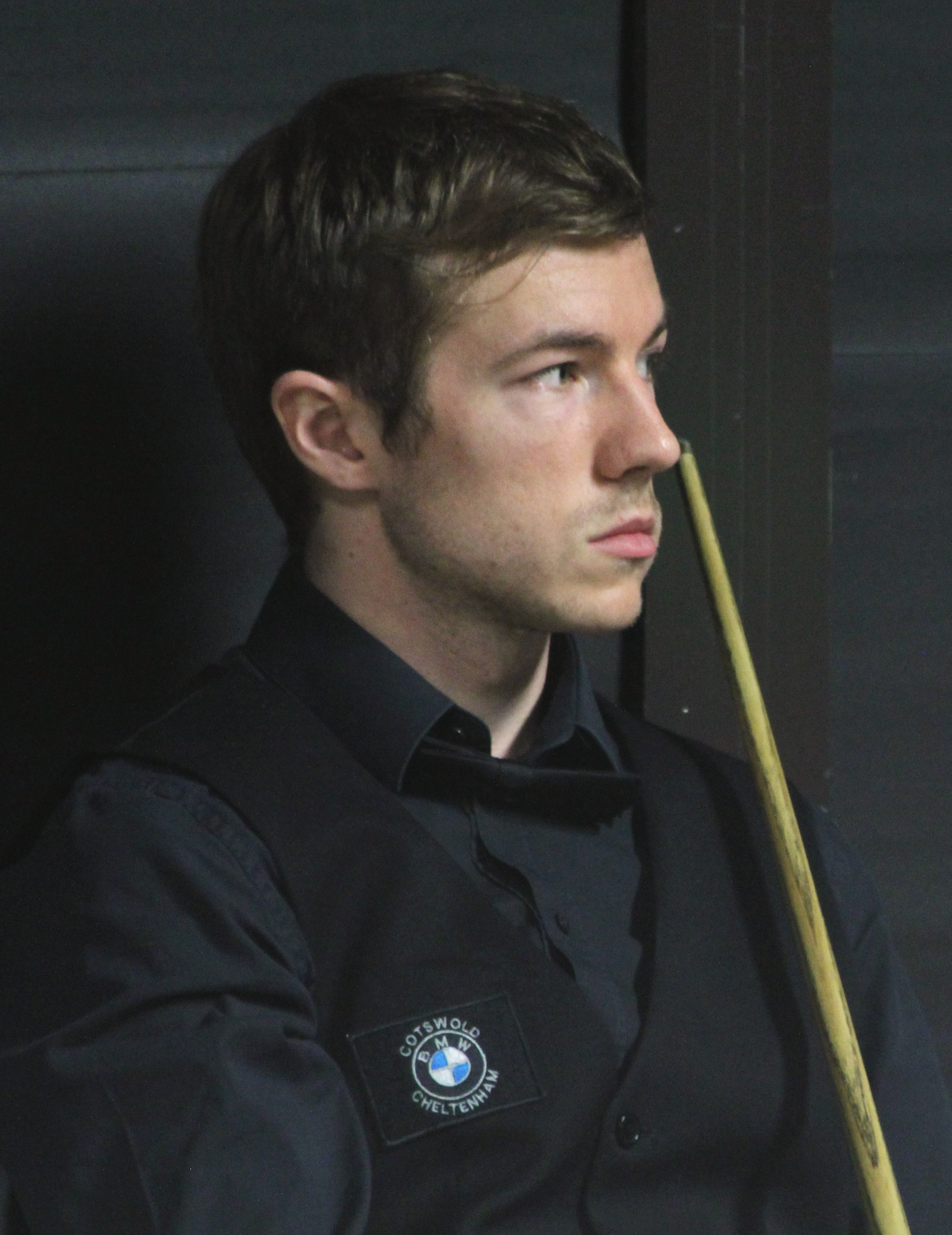
Jack Lisowski (pictured in 2016) won his maiden ranking title at the previous Home Nations Series event, the 2025 Northern Ireland Open. He lost in the first round of the Scottish Open.

The first-round matches were played on 15 and 16 December. John Higgins, twice runner-up at the tournament in 2016 and 2021, led Kowalski 3–1 after making a century of 104 in frame four. Kowalski won the fifth frame on the last black, but Higgins took frame six on the colours for a 4–2 victory. Joe O'Connor, runner-up at the 2022 edition, defeated Stan Moody in a deciding frame, which improved his chances of qualifying for the 2026 World Grand Prix but meant that Moody, at 33rd on the one-year list, would not qualify. "It was a big match for me and my season," O'Connor said afterwards. "There was an extra bit of pressure, but it is the same game whether there is pressure or not. You just need to go out there and perform how you do on the practice table." Shaun Murphy took a 2–1 lead over Liu Hongyu after making a 140 break in the second frame. Liu then made breaks of 117 and 74 to move 3–2 ahead, but Murphy won two lengthy frames to secure a 4–3 victory. Stuart Bingham advanced with a 4–2 win over Artemijs Žižins.

McGill made breaks of 90 and 118 and won frames on the last pink and last black to beat Tom Ford 4–1. "It is the last tournament of the year and my target was just to enjoy it today," he said, adding that: "I have a few off-table things which have distracted me, but going into the New Year my mind is going to be totally on snooker." Mark Selby, recent winner of the 2025 UK Championship, won the opening frame against Robbie McGuigan despite requiring two snookers. He then made breaks of 112, 92, and 58 to win the match 4–1. "I'm really happy to have won another Triple Crown title," Selby commented afterwards. "It is really tough with the amount of pressure I put on myself." Kyren Wilson, who claimed he had come close to a "mental breakdown" at the UK Championship over his effort to find a satisfactory cue, used another new cue to defeat Gao Yang 4–1, making a century of 129 in the match. "I'm using a new cue which I picked up last Sunday," commented Wilson, whose old cue had been irreparably damaged during the summer months. "For the first time in three or four months, I've practised with the same cue for a week with no hassle and no worries. Hopefully that is a sign of good things to come." Mark Allen, winner of the 2025 English Open, made breaks of 97, 74, 88, and 84 as he whitewashed Ishpreet Singh Chadha, while Jack Lisowski, winner of the 2025 Northern Ireland Open, lost 1–4 to Wang Yuchen.

=== Round two (last 32) ===
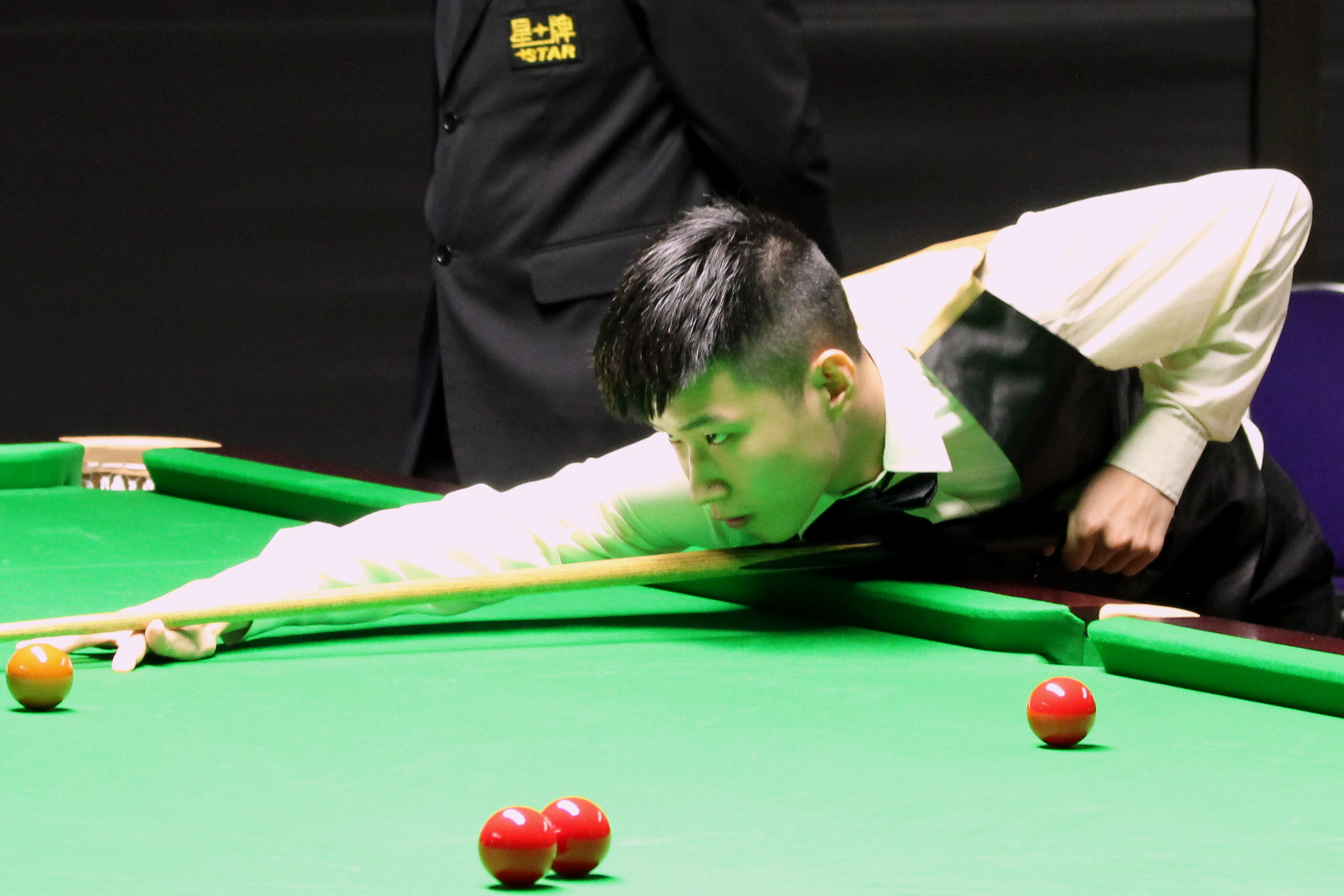
The reigning World Champion Zhao Xintong (pictured in 2016) made a 146 break in his second-round match against Joe O'Connor.

The second-round matches were played on 17 December. The defending champion Lei Peifan led Yuan Sijun 3–2, but Yuan tied the scores at 3–3 and then won the deciding frame with a century of 126. Noppon Saengkham made breaks including 69 and 100 as he whitewashed Higgins, only the 15th time in his career that Higgins had been whitewashed in a ranking event. "It isn't easy to beat [Higgins] in Scotland," said Saengkham afterwards. "This is his home event and there are a lot of fans supporting him." Chris Wakelin also whitewashed McGill. After the defeats by Higgins and McGill, no Scottish players remained in the event. Selby advanced with a whitewash victory over Hossein Vafaei, while Allen extended his position as frontrunner for the £150,000 Home Nations Series bonus as he whitewashed Wang, making breaks of 57, 65, and 109. "Look I'm aware of the bonus, I'm not going to lie," Allen said afterwards. "But ultimately you have to go out there to win matches and win tournaments." In another whitewash victory, Zhang Anda defeated Matthew Stevens.

The reigning World Champion Zhao Xintong made a 146 break in the opening frame of his match with O'Connor. However, O'Connor produced breaks including 97 and 51 as he won four of the next five frames for a 4–2 victory. "I enjoy playing the best in the world," said O'Connor. "I've followed [Zhao's] journey right from the amateurs and I knew he was good then. He was always very nice to watch. He is very smooth and you could see he stood above the rest of the field." Kyren Wilson progressed with a 4–1 victory over Pang Junxu, making a highest break of 106, and Bingham defeated Murphy by the same score. Zhou Yuelong also advanced, beating Xiao Guodong 4–2. Chang Bingyu made back-to-back centuries of 105 and 110 in the last two frames as he completed a 4–1 win over Si Jiahui.

=== Round three (last 16) ===
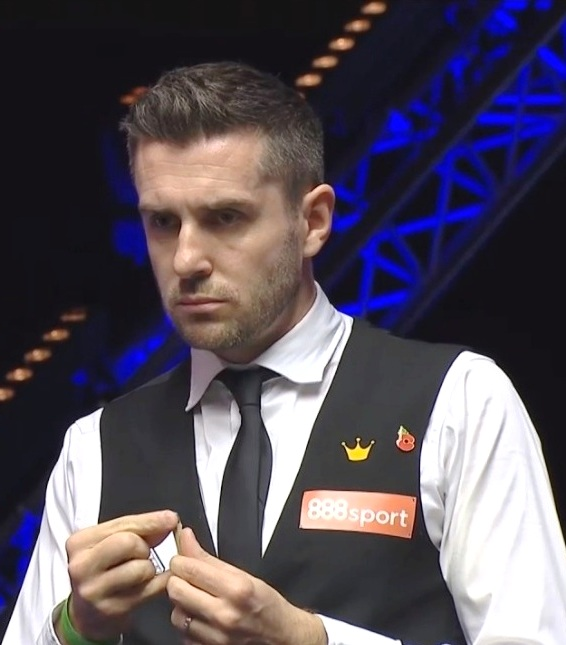
Mark Selby (pictured in 2020) recorded his 12th consecutive professional victory by whitewashing Noppon Saengkham, who failed to pot a ball in the match.

The third-round matches were played on 18 December. Chang made a century of 125 to win the first frame against the world number two Wilson. Wilson tied the scores by winning frame two, but Chang won frames three and four with breaks of 49 and 104 and completed a 4–1 victory on the last pink in frame five. Chang reached the quarter-finals of a ranking event for the first time and also secured his place in the 2026 World Grand Prix. Saengkham failed to pot a ball in his match against Selby, who made breaks of 94, 104, and 71 as he secured a whitewash victory, his 12th consecutive professional win. Selby attempted a maximum break in frame three but missed the 14th red. Saengkham's only four points in the match came courtesy of a foul by Selby in frame three. "The tempo I played in the last two games is how I play when I'm practising," said Selby afterwards. "It is only myself that sometimes stops that. I can get in my own way. I want to be getting on with it but sometimes mentally I stop myself. I seem to have my confidence up now and I fancy making the shots." Matthew Selt defeated Wu 4–1 to reach his first ranking quarter-final in over a year, and Jiang Jun beat Un-Nooh by the same score.

Allen and Zhang shared the first two frames of their match before Allen moved ahead with a century of 140. Zhang made a 71 to tie the scores at 2–2 at the mid-session interval, but Allen restored the lead with a century of 115 in frame five. Zhang won frame six to force a decider, but Allen secured victory, helped by a 58 break. "Both of us played a lot of good stuff there," said Allen. "I'm happy with the way I scored. There were just one or two mistakes and that was all it took for it to be 3–3. [Zhang] is a great player, so I'm happy to get over the line in any manner." Wakelin made a highest break of 74 in his 4–2 victory over Yuan Sijun; he reached the quarter-finals for a third consecutive year. Zhou defeated Bingham in a deciding frame with a 133 break. O'Connor won the first three frames against Zak Surety, making a century of 100 in the opener. Surety took frame four and then came from behind to win frame five on the last black, but O'Connor completed a 4–2 victory in frame six.

=== Quarter-finals ===
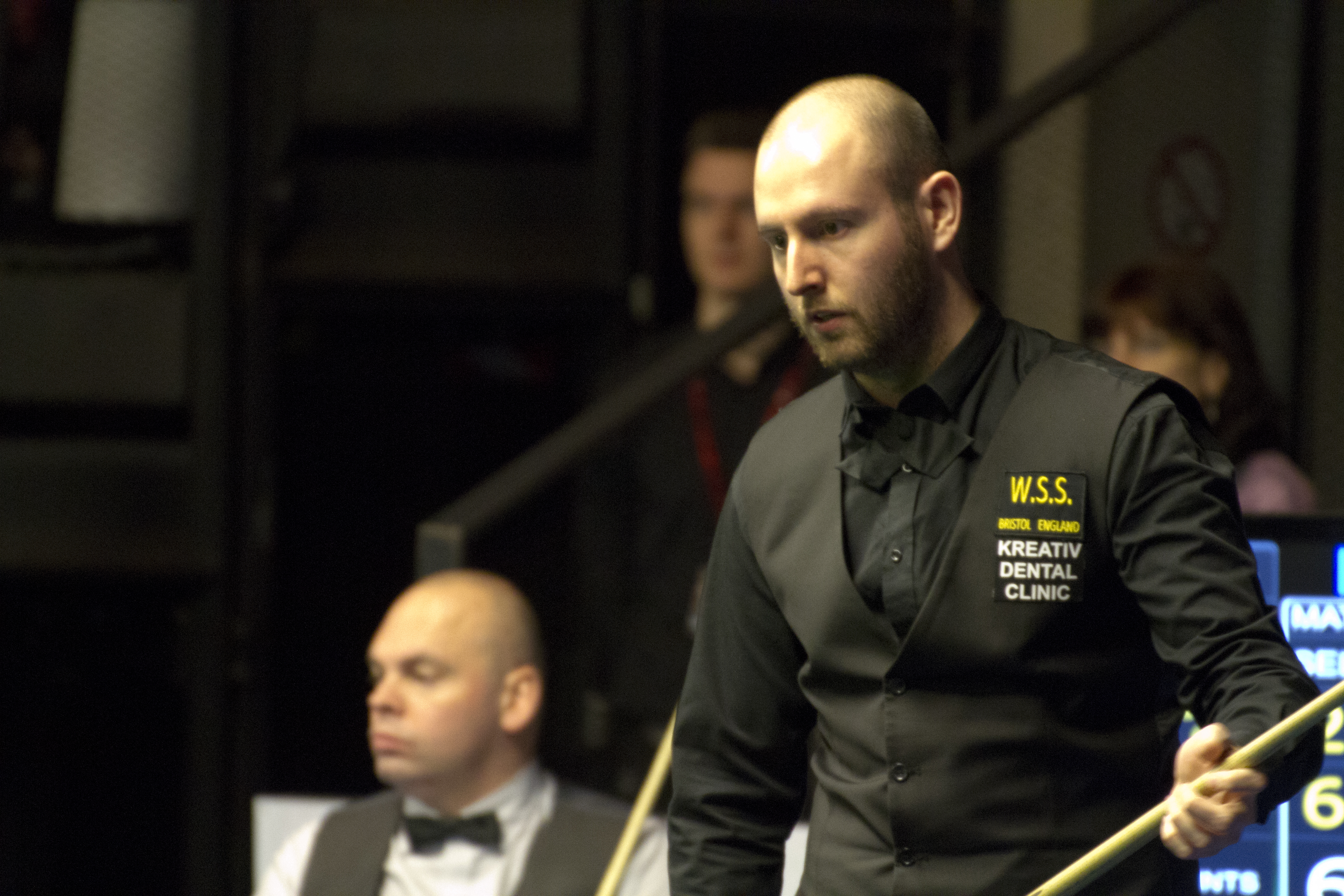
Matthew Selt (pictured in 2015) defeated Jiang Jun. He credited reaching the semi-finals to a new coaching regimen.

The quarter-finals were played on 19 December as the best of nine frames. Facing Selby, Chang won the first two frames with breaks of 72 and 135, but Selby produced breaks of 92 and 76 to tie the scores at the mid-session interval. Chang took frame five with a 91 break, but Selby made a 67 to take frame six. Chang then made breaks of 95 and 77 to win the match 5–3 and reach his maiden ranking semi-final. Wakelin made breaks of 102, 75, and 76 as he took a 4–1 lead over Zhou. In frame five, Wakelin was awarded a free ball with all 15 reds remaining and had the opportunity to make a break of 153 and then 151 before he missed the ninth red. A break exceeding 147 had been achieved only once in professional competition, when Jamie Burnett made a 148 in the 2004 UK Championship qualifiers. Zhou won frames six and seven with breaks of 99 and 89, but Wakelin secured a 5–3 victory in frame eight. "It was a magic opportunity [in the fifth frame]," Wakelin said afterwards. "I'm gutted I didn't make it. Just speaking to Jimmy White there and these opportunities come around once or twice in your career. I'm delighted to get to the semis, but that would have been really cool to make a break above 147."

Selt made breaks of 104, 92, 54, and 56 as he defeated Jiang 5–2, but he downplayed his chances of winning the event, claiming he had "no chance". Commenting on his time spent rebuilding his cue action with coach Chris Henry and practising with Higgins, he said: "I'm just concentrating on pulling my cue back the desired amount. The rest of it is falling into place....To be in the semi-finals is instant feedback on what we are trying to do [technically]. I felt really tight and snatchy when I was trying to get over the line, but that is something I will work on before tomorrow." Allen made a 139 break as he defeated O'Connor, also by a 5–2 scoreline.

=== Semi-finals ===
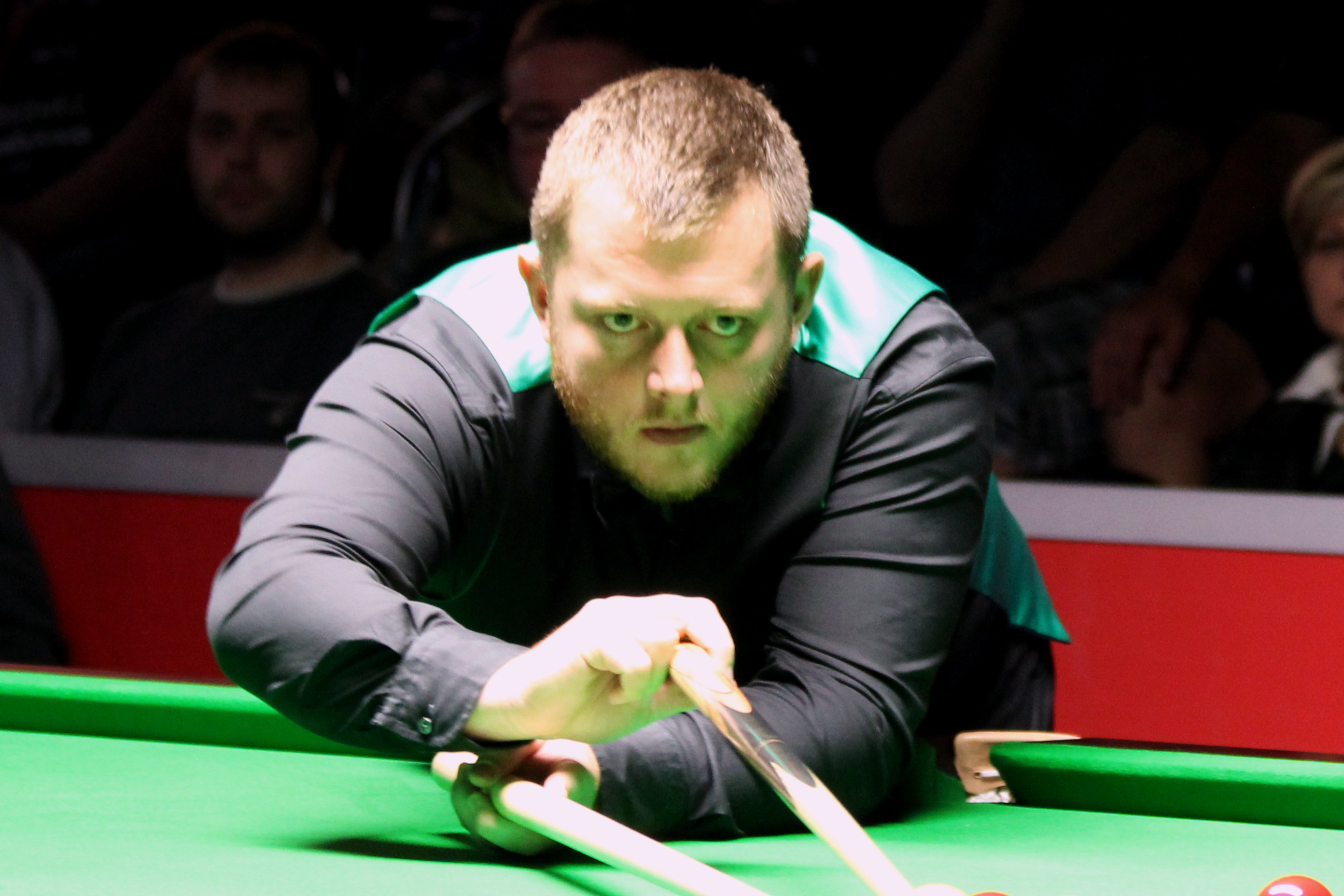
Mark Allen (pictured in 2016) won the season's first Home Nations Series event, the 2025 English Open. He lost to Chang Bingyu in the semi-finals.

The semi-finals were played on 20 December as the best of 11 frames. Facing Selt in the first semi-final, Wakelin made breaks of 80, 108, and 58 as he took a 4–2 lead. Selt won frame seven with a clearance of 64 after Wakelin missed the black while on a break of 56. Wakelin won frame eight with a century of 104 to lead 5–3 and took a 56-point lead in frame nine, but Selt won the frame with a clearance of 70. Selt led in frame 10, but Wakelin made a 70 break to win the match 6–4. "Only a couple of weeks ago, things were tough and on the slide," said Wakelin, who had missed out on being seeded at the 2025 UK Championship and failed to qualify for the 2026 Masters after falling to 17th in the world rankings. "I'd gone from climbing the rankings to three or four bad months. To come here, with not very much confidence and be in the final, I have far surpassed my expectations. I will be going for it tomorrow. There will be plenty of aggression from me and I'll be trying to win it."

Facing Allen in the second semi-final, Chang made back-to-back centuries of 134 and 108 in the first two frames and made three other half-centuries of 67, 68, and 57 as he secured a 6–1 victory. Allen, who used a replacement cue during the match as his main cue was being repaired, gave the cue to a young fan at the conclusion of the match. "I didn't expect to play so well today," said Chang afterwards. "I just kept the same mindset as my previous matches. After that 134 break in the first frame, I felt completely locked in and focused. I feel like I'm playing better each match. Competing at a high intensity against these top players helps improve my game. I do feel like my positional play still needs improvement, but today my touch was pretty good."

=== Final ===
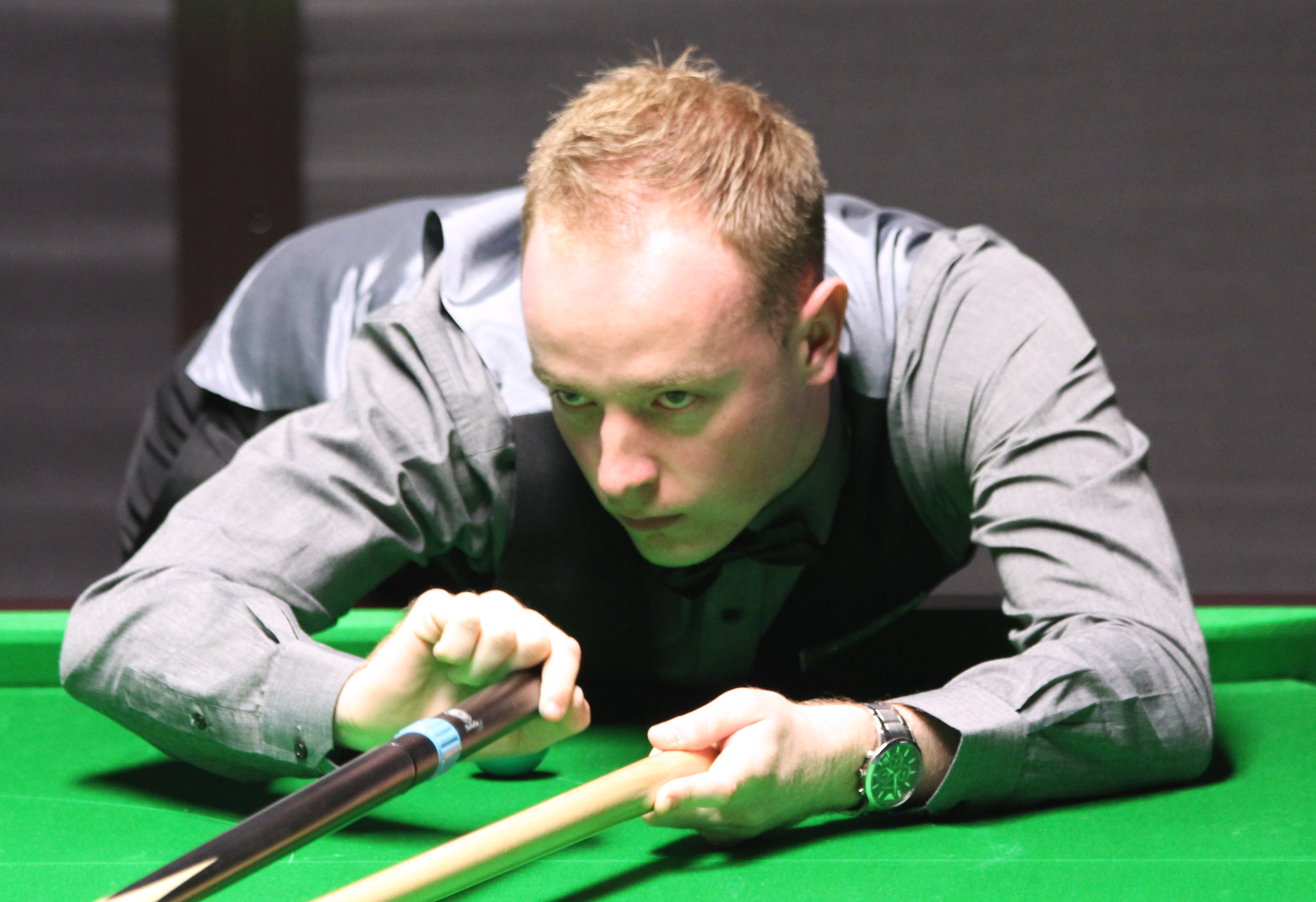
Chris Wakelin (pictured in 2016) defeated maiden ranking finalist Chang Bingyu 9–2 to win his second ranking title.

The final was played on 21 December as the best of 17 frames, held over two sessions, between the world number 17 Wakelin and the world number 70 Chang. Wakelin was playing in his fourth ranking final, having previously won the January 2023 Snooker Shoot Out and been runner-up at the 2023 Northern Ireland Open and the 2024 International Championship. Chang had returned to the sport in December 2024 after serving a two-year ban for match-fixing. After earning a new tour card by winning the Asia-Pacific Snooker Championship in April 2025, he had rejoined the professional tour at the beginning of the 2025–26 season. Playing in the maiden ranking final of his career, he was the 16th different player from mainland China to reach a ranking final. The players had met only once before in professional competition, at the 2021 Gibraltar Open, when Wakelin recovered from 0–2 behind to win 4–2. The final was the last match refereed by Leo Scullion before his retirement. Scullion, from Glasgow, had refereed professionally since 1999. The final was the fourth Scottish Open final he officiated.

Wakelin won the opening frame with a 73 break, but Chang won frame two and made a century of 107 to take frame three. Wakelin then produced breaks including 66, 96, 70, and 66 as he won five consecutive frames to lead 6–2 after the first session. In the second session, Wakelin made breaks of 50, 67, and 104 as he won another three consecutive frames, for a total of eight consecutive frames in the match, to complete a 9–2 victory. It was the second ranking title of Wakelin's career and his first time winning a full-format final. He re-entered the top 16 after the tournament, moving from 17th to 14th place in the world rankings. "It was an incredible game," said Wakelin afterwards. "I felt like I got on top of him early in the match. That first session was a bit of a killer. I came out tonight and I was determined to get the job done quickly and as pain free as possible. I'm absolutely delighted with how I played today." He added: "I believed in myself ahead of the match. Just believing in myself over the last couple of years has been the catalyst." Chang, who advanced from 70th to 62nd in the world rankings as runner-up, said: "I didn't think I could make it this far or be in this final. I'm happy because I've made huge progress. I must thank my parents. They have put in a lot of effort to make me a professional. Tonight wasn't my night and [Wakelin] played very well."

== Main draw ==
The results of the main draw are shown below. Numbers in parentheses after the players' names denote the top 32 seeds, an "a" indicates an amateur player who was not on the main World Snooker Tour, and players in bold denote match winners.

=== Top half ===
**Last 64**; Best of 7 frames
**Lei Peifan (CHN) (1)**	**4**
Amir Sarkhosh (IRN)	3
**Yuan Sijun (CHN) (29)**	**4**
Ben Woollaston (ENG)	1
**Chris Wakelin (ENG) (13)**	**4**
Oliver Lines (ENG)	2
Tom Ford (ENG) (20)	1
**Anthony McGill (SCO)**	**4**
**Stuart Bingham (ENG) (19)**	**4**
Artemijs Žižins (LVA)	2
**Shaun Murphy (ENG) (10)**	**4**
Liu Hongyu (CHN)	3
**Zhou Yuelong (CHN) (28)**	**4**
Sam Craigie (ENG)	3
**Xiao Guodong (CHN) (8)**	**4**
Michael Holt (ENG)	3
Mark Williams (WAL) (5) (Note: Mark Williams withdrew and so Ben Mertens was given a walkover to the last 32.)	w/d
**Ben Mertens** (BEL)	**w/o**
Jackson Page (WAL) (30)	0
**Thepchaiya Un-Nooh (THA)**	**4**
Barry Hawkins (ENG) (11)	0
**Jiang Jun (CHN)**	**4**
**David Gilbert (ENG) (22)**	**4**
Ashley Hugill (ENG) (a)	1
**Wu Yize (CHN) (18)**	**4**
Ian Burns (ENG)	0
Gary Wilson (ENG) (15)	1
**Lan Yuhao (CHN)**	**4**
**Matthew Selt (ENG) (31)**	**4**
Ryan Day (WAL)	2
Neil Robertson (AUS) (4) (Note: Neil Robertson withdrew and so He Guoqiang was given a walkover to the last 32.)	w/d
**He Guoqiang** (CHN)	**w/o**

**Last 32**; Best of 7 frames
(China) Lei Peifan (1)	3
**(China) Yuan Sijun (29)**	**4**
**(England) Chris Wakelin (13)**	**4**
(Scotland) Anthony McGill	0
**(England) Stuart Bingham (19)**	**4**
(England) Shaun Murphy (10)	1
**(China) Zhou Yuelong (28)**	**4**
(China) Xiao Guodong (8)	2
(Belgium) Ben Mertens	2
**(Thailand) Thepchaiya Un-Nooh**	**4**
**(China) Jiang Jun**	**4**
(England) David Gilbert (22)	3
**(China) Wu Yize (18)**	**4**
(China) Lan Yuhao	0
**(England) Matthew Selt (31)**	**4**
(China) He Guoqiang	0

**Last 16**; Best of 7 frames
(China) Yuan Sijun (29)	2
**(England) Chris Wakelin (13)**	**4**
(England) Stuart Bingham (19)	3
**(China) Zhou Yuelong (28)**	**4**
(Thailand) Thepchaiya Un-Nooh	1
**(China) Jiang Jun**	**4**
(China) Wu Yize (18)	1
**(England) Matthew Selt (31)**	**4**

**Quarter-finals**; Best of 9 frames
**(England) Chris Wakelin (13)**	**5**
(China) Zhou Yuelong (28)	3
(China) Jiang Jun	2
**(England) Matthew Selt (31)**	**5**

**Semi-finals**; Best of 11 frames
**(England) Chris Wakelin (13)**	**6**
(England) Matthew Selt (31)	4

Note: w/d=withdrawn; w/o=walkover

=== Bottom half ===
**Last 64**; Best of 7 frames
**Kyren Wilson (ENG) (3)**	**4**
Gao Yang (CHN)	1
**Pang Junxu (CHN) (26)**	**4**
Robbie Williams (ENG)	3
**Si Jiahui (CHN) (14)**	**4**
Mark Davis (ENG)	3
Stephen Maguire (SCO) (23)	2
**Chang Bingyu (CHN)**	**4**
**Hossein Vafaei (IRN) (24)**	**4**
David Grace (ENG)	2
**Mark Selby (ENG) (9)**	**4**
Robbie McGuigan (NIR)	1
**Noppon Saengkham (THA) (32)**	**4**
Liam Pullen (ENG)	3
**John Higgins (SCO) (6)**	**4**
Antoni Kowalski (POL)	2
**Mark Allen (NIR) (7)**	**4**
Ishpreet Singh Chadha (IND)	0
Jack Lisowski (ENG) (27)	1
**Wang Yuchen (HKG)**	**4**
**Zhang Anda (CHN) (12)**	**4**
Fan Zhengyi (CHN)	1
Jak Jones (WAL) (17) (Note: Jak Jones withdrew and so Matthew Stevens was given a walkover to the last 32.)	w/d
**Matthew Stevens** (WAL)	**w/o**
**Elliot Slessor (ENG) (21)**	**4**
Steven Hallworth (ENG)	0
Ali Carter (ENG) (16)	2
**Zak Surety (ENG)**	**4**
**Joe O'Connor (ENG) (25)**	**4**
Stan Moody (ENG)	3
**Zhao Xintong** (CHN) (2)	**w/o**
Robert Milkins (ENG) (Note: Robert Milkins withdrew and so Zhao Xintong was given a walkover to the last 32.)	w/d

**Last 32**; Best of 7 frames
**(England) Kyren Wilson (3)**	**4**
(China) Pang Junxu (26)	1
(China) Si Jiahui (14)	1
**(China) Chang Bingyu**	**4**
(Iran) Hossein Vafaei (24)	0
**(England) Mark Selby (9)**	**4**
**(Thailand) Noppon Saengkham (32)**	**4**
(Scotland) John Higgins (6)	0
**(Northern Ireland) Mark Allen (7)**	**4**
(Hong Kong) Wang Yuchen	0
**(China) Zhang Anda (12)**	**4**
(Wales) Matthew Stevens	0
(England) Elliot Slessor (21)	1
**(England) Zak Surety**	**4**
**(England) Joe O'Connor (25)**	**4**
(China) Zhao Xintong (2)	2

**Last 16**; Best of 7 frames
(England) Kyren Wilson (3)	1
**(China) Chang Bingyu**	**4**
**(England) Mark Selby (9)**	**4**
(Thailand) Noppon Saengkham (32)	0
**(Northern Ireland) Mark Allen (7)**	**4**
(China) Zhang Anda (12)	3
(England) Zak Surety	2
**(England) Joe O'Connor (25)**	**4**

**Quarter-finals**; Best of 9 frames
**(China) Chang Bingyu**	**5**
(England) Mark Selby (9)	3
**(Northern Ireland) Mark Allen (7)**	**5**
(England) Joe O'Connor (25)	2

**Semi-finals**; Best of 11 frames
**(China) Chang Bingyu**	**6**
(Northern Ireland) Mark Allen (7)	1

Note: w/d=withdrawn; w/o=walkover

=== Final: frame scores ===
Final: Best of 17 frames. Referee: Leo Scullion; Meadowbank Sports Centre, Edinburgh, Scotland, 21 December 2025
**Chris Wakelin** (13); England	**9**–2	Chang Bingyu; China
Afternoon: **103**–22, 14–**77**, 4–**107** (107), **73**–50, **96**–24, **72**–0, **68**–36, **67**–0; Evening: **67**–5, **72**–25, **112**–13 (104)
(frame 11) 104	Highest break	**107** (frame 3)
1	Century breaks	1

== Qualifying rounds ==
The results of the early rounds are shown below. Numbers in parentheses after the players' names denote the players' seeding, an "a" indicates amateur players who were not on the main World Snooker Tour, and players in bold denote match winners.

**Round 1 (Last 128)**; Best of 7 frames
**Amir Sarkhosh (IRN) (71)**	**4**
Amaan Iqbal (SCO) (a)	3
**Liam Highfield (ENG) (91)**	**4**
Michał Szubarczyk (POL) (104)	0
Haris Tahir (PAK) (79)	2
**Stuart Carrington (ENG) (a)**	**4**
**Liam Davies (WAL) (67)**	**4**
Hatem Yassen (EGY) (101)	2
**Artemijs Žižins (LVA) (72)**	**4**
Mateusz Baranowski (POL) (119)	3
**Huang Jiahao (CHN) (83)**	**4**
Ng On Yee (HKG) (112)	1
**Sam Craigie (ENG) (84)**	**4**
Florian Nüßle (AUT) (120)	1
Chris Totten (SCO) (86)	1
**Ryan Davies (ENG) (a)**	**4**
**Julien Leclercq (BEL) (74)**	**4**
Umut Dikme (GER) (a)	0
Marco Fu (HKG) (90) (Note: Marco Fu withdrew due to a fractured elbow and so Chatchapong Nasa was given a walkover to the second round of qualifying.)	w/d
**Chatchapong Nasa** (THA) (105)	**w/o**
Reanne Evans (ENG) (87)	0
**Jiang Jun (CHN) (118)**	**4**
Zhao Hanyang (CHN) (94)	3
**Ashley Hugill (ENG) (a)**	**4**
Mitchell Mann (ENG) (78)	0
**Ian Burns (ENG) (99)**	**4**
**Lan Yuhao (CHN) (95)**	**4**
Liu Wenwei (CHN) (116)	1
Louis Heathcote (ENG) (75)	1
**Yao Pengcheng (CHN) (111)**	**4**
Bulcsú Révész (HUN) (76)	1
**Alexander Ursenbacher (SUI) (110)**	**4**

**Round 2 (Last 96)**; Best of 7 frames
Jordan Brown (NIR) (50)	1
**Amir Sarkhosh (IRN) (71)**	**4**
**Ben Woollaston (ENG) (35)**	**4**
Liam Highfield (ENG) (91)	3
**Oliver Lines (ENG) (61)**	**4**
Stuart Carrington (ENG) (a)	1
**Anthony McGill (SCO) (42)**	**4**
Liam Davies (WAL) (67)	1
Jimmy Robertson (ENG) (34)	2
**Artemijs Žižins (LVA) (72)**	**4**
**Liu Hongyu (CHN) (57)**	**4**
Huang Jiahao (CHN) (83)	0
Jamie Jones (WAL) (45)	1
**Sam Craigie (ENG) (84)**	**4**
**Michael Holt (ENG) (62)**	**4**
Ryan Davies (ENG) (a)	2
**Ben Mertens (BEL) (63)**	**4**
Julien Leclercq (BEL) (74)	2
**Thepchaiya Un-Nooh (THA) (41)**	**4**
Chatchapong Nasa (THA) (105)	1
Long Zehuang (CHN) (51)	1
**Jiang Jun (CHN) (118)**	**4**
Martin O'Donnell (ENG) (40)	2
**Ashley Hugill (ENG) (a)**	**4**
Aaron Hill (IRL) (43)	2
**Ian Burns (ENG) (99)**	**4**
Sanderson Lam (ENG) (59)	2
**Lan Yuhao (CHN) (95)**	**4**
**Ryan Day (WAL) (33)**	**4**
Yao Pengcheng (CHN) (111)	3
**He Guoqiang (CHN) (49)**	**4**
Alexander Ursenbacher (SUI) (110)	1

**Round 1 (Last 128)**; Best of 7 frames
**Gao Yang (CHN) (96)**	**4**
Connor Benzey (ENG) (114)	0
**Bai Yulu (CHN) (89)**	**4**
Kreishh Gurbaxani (IND) (109)	0
Allan Taylor (ENG) (69)	0
**Liam Graham (SCO) (106)**	**4**
**Chang Bingyu (CHN) (68)**	**4**
Xu Yichen (CHN) (117)	2
**David Grace (ENG) (92)**	**4**
Sahil Nayyar (CAN) (115)	2
**Robbie McGuigan (NIR) (81)**	**4**
Oliver Brown (ENG) (107)	1
Farakh Ajaib (PAK) (73)	1
**Liam Pullen (ENG) (98)**	**4**
**Antoni Kowalski (POL) (66)**	**4**
Leone Crowley (IRL) (102)	1
**Dylan Emery (WAL) (88)**	**4**
Jack Borwick (SCO) (a)	1
**Wang Yuchen (HKG) (70)**	**4**
Jonas Luz (BRA) (100)	0
**Cheung Ka Wai (HKG) (80)**	**4**
Fergal Quinn (NIR) (113)	3
**Haydon Pinhey (ENG) (77)**	**4**
Mink Nutcharut (THA) (103)	0
**Steven Hallworth (ENG) (85)**	**4**
Mahmoud El Hareedy (EGY) (121)	0
**Duane Jones (WAL) (65)**	**4**
Patrick Whelan (ENG) (a)	3
Ken Doherty (IRL) (93) (Note: Ken Doherty withdrew and so Ross Muir was given a walkover to the second round of qualifying.)	w/d
**Ross Muir** (SCO) (97)	**w/o**
**Iulian Boiko (UKR) (82)**	**4**
Jimmy White (ENG) (108)	1

**Round 2 (Last 96)**; Best of 7 frames
Scott Donaldson (SCO) (54)	1
**Gao Yang (CHN) (96)**	**4**
**Robbie Williams (ENG) (47)**	**4**
Bai Yulu (CHN) (89)	0
**Mark Davis (ENG) (56)**	**4**
Liam Graham (SCO) (106)	0
Xu Si (CHN) (36)	0
**Chang Bingyu (CHN) (68)**	**4**
Lyu Haotian (CHN) (38) (Note: Lyu Haotian withdrew and so David Grace was given a walkover to the last 64.)	w/d
**David Grace** (ENG) (92)	**w/o**
Gong Chenzhi (CHN) (64)	1
**Robbie McGuigan (NIR) (81)**	**4**
Daniel Wells (WAL) (44)	0
**Liam Pullen (ENG) (98)**	**4**
David Lilley (ENG) (55)	2
**Antoni Kowalski (POL) (66)**	**4**
**Ishpreet Singh Chadha (IND) (60)**	**4**
Dylan Emery (WAL) (88)	3
Ricky Walden (ENG) (39)	3
**Wang Yuchen (HKG) (70)**	**4**
**Fan Zhengyi (CHN) (52)**	**4**
Cheung Ka Wai (HKG) (80)	0
**Matthew Stevens (WAL) (48)**	**4**
Haydon Pinhey (ENG) (77)	2
Luca Brecel (BEL) (37) (Note: Luca Brecel failed to appear and so Steven Hallworth was given a walkover to the last 64.)	n/s
**Steven Hallworth** (ENG) (85)	**w/o**
**Zak Surety (ENG) (58)**	**4**
Duane Jones (WAL) (65)	1
**Stan Moody (ENG) (46)**	**4**
Ross Muir (SCO) (97)	1
**Robert Milkins (ENG) (53)**	**4**
Iulian Boiko (UKR) (82)	3

Note: w/d=withdrawn; n/s=no-show; w/o=walkover

== Century breaks ==
=== Main stage centuries ===
A total of 49 century breaks were made during the main stage of the tournament in Edinburgh.

- 146 – Zhao Xintong
- 140, 139, 115, 109 – Mark Allen
- 140, 133, 123, 100 – Zhou Yuelong
- 140 – Shaun Murphy
- 136 – Si Jiahui
- 135, 134, 125, 110, 108, 107, 105, 104, 102 – Chang Bingyu
- 135 – Liam Pullen
- 131, 112, 104 – Mark Selby
- 129, 106 – Kyren Wilson
- 127, 100 – Joe O'Connor
- 126 – Yuan Sijun
- 125, 102 – David Gilbert
- 124 – Lei Peifan
- 123 – Wu Yize
- 119, 100 – Noppon Saengkham
- 118 – Anthony McGill
- 117 – Liu Hongyu
- 112, 110, 107, 105 – Jiang Jun
- 112 – Lan Yuhao
- 108, 104, 104, 102 – Chris Wakelin
- 104 – John Higgins
- 104 – Matthew Selt
- 102 – Thepchaiya Un-Nooh

=== Qualifying stage centuries ===
A total of 18 century breaks were made during the qualifying stage of the tournament in Wigan.

- 144 – Thepchaiya Un-Nooh
- 142 – Amir Sarkhosh
- 136 – Sam Craigie
- 136 – Lan Yuhao
- 133, 100 – Chang Bingyu
- 133 – Alexander Ursenbacher
- 131 – Liam Highfield
- 122, 104 – Julien Leclercq
- 116 – Patrick Whelan
- 113, 112 – Ricky Walden
- 113 – Long Zehuang
- 109 – He Guoqiang
- 104 – Robert Milkins
- 101 – Jack Borwick
- 100 – Wang Yuchen
