= Leo Scullion =

Scottish snooker referee

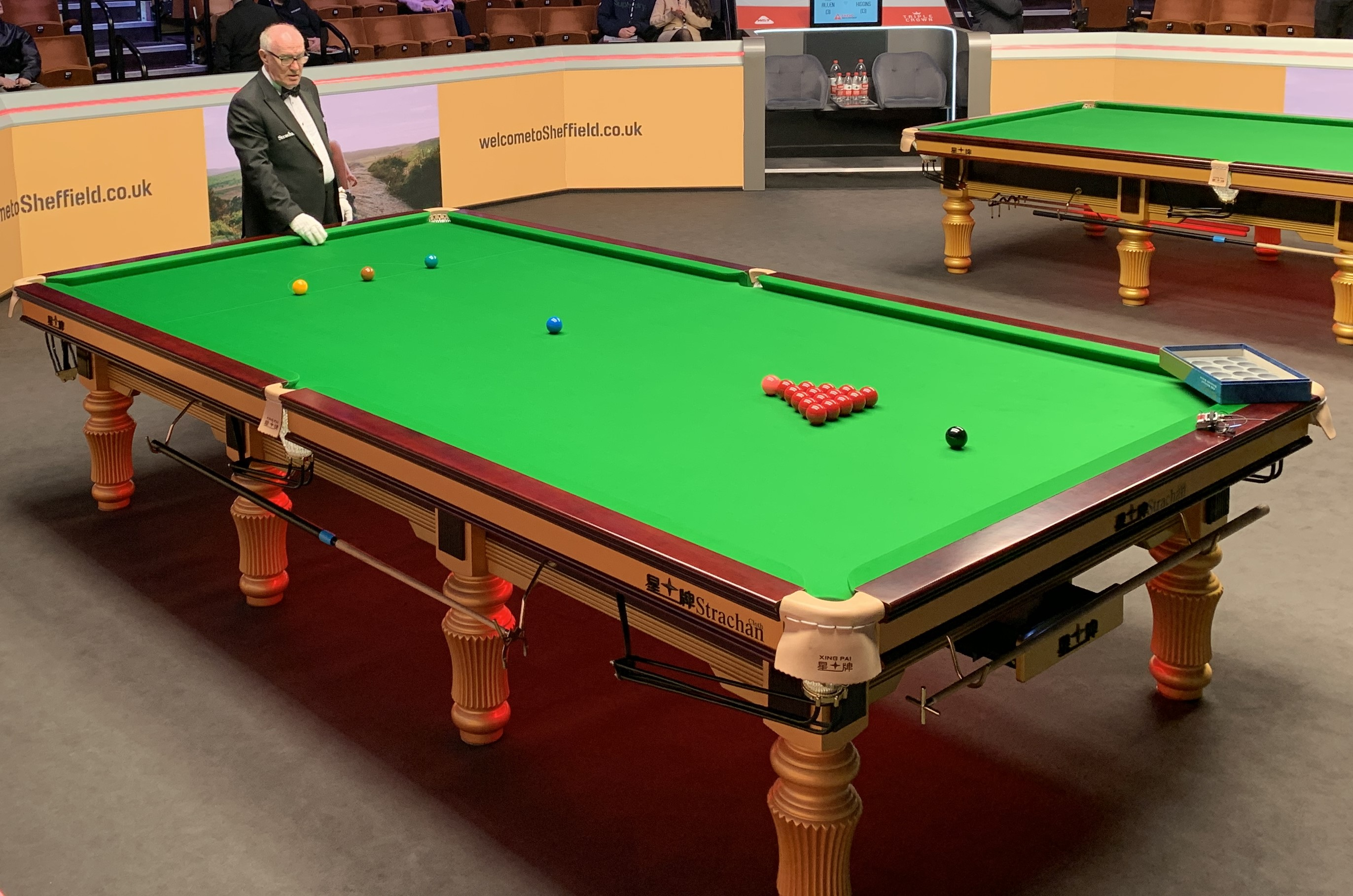
- Scullion at the 2024 World Snooker Championship

Personal information
- Born: 10 April 1958 (age 68) Glasgow, Scotland

Sport
- Country: Scotland
- Sport: Snooker
- Professional: 1999–2025

Leo Scullion (born 10 April 1958) is a retired professional snooker referee from Glasgow, Scotland. A former taxi driver and policeman, Scullion officiated on the World Snooker Tour from 1999 to 2025, during which time he refereed two Triple Crown finals at the 2012 UK Championship and the 2019 World Snooker Championship. He retired from professional refereeing after officiating the final of the 2025 Scottish Open.

== Career ==
Scullion worked as a taxi driver and had a 20-year career as a policeman. He first qualified as a grade three snooker referee in 1984. He made his professional refereeing debut in 1999 and officiated his first televised match at the 2001 Scottish Masters, a tie between Stephen Lee and Patrick Wallace. He refereed his first Triple Crown final at the 2012 UK Championship, in which Mark Selby defeated Shaun Murphy.

In 2014, after returning from a tournament in China, Scullion noticed a cough and was eventually diagnosed with lung cancer. He took a two-year break from refereeing, during which time he underwent chemotherapy and radiotherapy. After returning to the circuit in 2016, he officiated the final of the 2019 World Championship, in which Judd Trump defeated John Higgins.

Scullion retired from professional refereeing in December 2025 after officiating the final of the 2025 Scottish Open, at which Chris Wakelin defeated Chang Bingyu. He will remain involved in the tour as an assessor.

== Personal life ==
In a 2010 interview with World Snooker, Scullion stated that his hobbies include watching TV and playing golf and snooker. He said that he had made a highest break of 93.
