= Lan Yuhao =

Chinese snooker player (born 2008)

Personal information
- Born: 26 August 2008 (age 18)

Sport
- Country: China
- Sport: Snooker
- Professional: 2025–present
- Highest ranking: 78 (July 2026)
- Current ranking: 80 (as of 7 November 2026)
- Best ranking finish: Last 32 (2025 Scottish Open)

Lan Yuhao (born 26 August 2008) is a Chinese snooker player. He was awarded a two-year card on the World Snooker Tour, from the start of the 2025-26 snooker season.

== Career ==
Growing up in China, his contemporaries that he would practise with included future women’s world champion snooker player Bai Yulu. Coached by Li Jianbing, he won the Chinese youth tournament as a youngster.

In March 2024, he was awarded a wildcard into the 2024 World Open where he lost to professional Jordan Brown. In May 2024, he played at the Asia/Oceania Q School in Bangkok. In the first event he lost in the penultimate round to Sunny Akani. In the second event, he had a 4-2 victory against compatriot Chen Qiyu to reach the final round, where he lost to Haris Tahir of Pakistan who gained a two-year professional place.

He finished as runner-up to Yao Pengchang on the CBSA China Tour in 2024. He was awarded a two-year card on the World Snooker Tour, from the start of the 2025-26 snooker season. At the age of 16 years-of-age he became the second youngest player on the tour after Polish player Michal Szubarczyk.

=== 2025–26 season ===
On his debut tournament as a professional he was drawn against compatriot Zhou Yuelong at the 2025 Wuhan Open. At his second tournament, the 2025 British Open, with qualifiers also played in June 2025, he lost against Reanne Evans. He was drawn in the round-robin stage of the 2025 Championship League against Matthew Stevens, Ryan Day and compatriot Xu Yichen. His results including a win over Xu Yichen for his first professional win in a match that saw him make a break of 142, and a credible draw against eventual group-winner Stevens. Later that season, he won three matches at the 2025 Saudi Arabia Masters before coming through two qualifying rounds to reach the main draw at the 2025 Northern Ireland Open. He reached the last-32 of the 2025 Scottish Open with a win over Gary Wilson, before losing to compatriot Wu Yize. In April 2026, he scored three century breaks to defeat Chatchapong Nasa 10-5 in the first round of qualifying for the 2026 World Snooker Championship, and came close to a 147 in the final frame but missed the 15th red to breakdown on 112. He suffered defeat in the second round to compatriot Fan Zhengyi.

== Performance and rankings timeline ==
Tournament	2023/ 24	2025/ 26	2026/ 27
Ranking (Note: It shows the ranking at the beginning of the season)	(Note: He was an amateur)	(Note: New players on the Main Tour don't have a ranking)	78
Ranking tournaments
Championship League	A	RR	RR
China Open	Not Held		LQ
Wuhan Open	A	LQ	LQ
British Open	A	LQ	LQ
English Open	A	LQ	LQ
Shenzhen Open (Note: The event was called the Xi'an Grand Prix (2024/2025–2025/2026))	NH	LQ	
Northern Ireland Open	A	1R	LQ
International Championship	A	LQ	LQ
UK Championship	A	LQ	LQ
Shoot Out	A	2R	
Scottish Open	A	2R	LQ
German Masters	A	LQ	LQ
Welsh Open	A	LQ	
World Grand Prix	DNQ	DNQ	
Players Championship	DNQ	DNQ	
World Open	LQ	LQ	
Tour Championship	DNQ	DNQ	
World Championship	A	LQ	
Former ranking tournaments
Saudi Arabia Masters	NH	4R	NH

Performance Table Legend
LQ	lost in the qualifying draw	#R	lost in the early rounds of the tournament (WR = Wildcard round, RR = Round robin)	QF	lost in the quarter-finals
SF	lost in the semi-finals	F	lost in the final	W	won the tournament
DNQ	did not qualify for the tournament	A	did not participate in the tournament	WD	withdrew from the tournament

NH / Not Held	means an event was not held.
NR / Non-Ranking Event	means an event is/was no longer a ranking event.
R / Ranking Event	means an event is/was a ranking event.
MR / Minor-Ranking Event	means an event is/was a minor-ranking event.
