= Mahmoud El Hareedy =

Egyptian snooker player (born 1998)

Personal information
- Born: 27 September 1998 (age 28)

Sport
- Country: Egypt
- Sport: Snooker
- Professional: 2025–present
- Highest ranking: 98 (July 2026)
- Current ranking: 114 (as of 7 November 2026)

Mahmoud El Hareedy (born 27 September 1998) is an Egyptian professional snooker player. He won the 2025 All Africa Snooker Championship to earn a two-year tour card for the World Snooker Tour from the 2025-26 snooker season.

== Career ==
In 2022, El Hareedy won the African Six-reds Championship held in Morocco, defeating countryman Mohamed Hammouda in the final. He was subsequently invited to play in the 2023 Six-red World Championship held in Bangkok, where he was placed in group G, facing Stuart Bingham, Noppon Saengkham and Jordan Brown.

In 2024, he placed third in the IBSF World Snooker Championship, the premier amateur tournament, the highest placement any Egyptian player has achieved in that event. In June 2025, he again reached the final of the African Six-reds Championship, losing 4‍–‍6 to South Africa's Mutalieb Allie. Later that month, he won the 2025 All Africa Snooker Championship, defeating Moroccan player Yassine Bellamine 6‍–‍1 in the final, and gaining a professional tour card on the World Snooker Tour for the 2025–26 and 2026–27 seasons.

=== 2025–26 season ===
El Hareedy failed to record any wins on the main tour in 2025 but achieved his first professional victory in the first qualifying round of the 2026 German Masters, defeating Iranian player Amir Sarkhosh 5‍–‍1. He subsequently lost 1‍–‍5 to Matthew Stevens in the second round of qualifying. He didn't win another match in the season, eventually losing 3‍–‍10 to Zhao Hanyang in the first qualifying round of the 2026 World Championship.

== Personal life ==
El Hareedy is from Alexandria and has represented the Smouha Sporting Club on an amateur level. He is right-handed.

== Performance and rankings timeline ==
Tournament	2022/ 23	2025/ 26	2026/ 27
Ranking (Note: It shows the ranking at the beginning of the season)	(Note: He was an amateur)	(Note: New players on the Main Tour don't have a ranking)	97
Ranking tournaments
Championship League	A	A	RR
China Open	Not Held		LQ
Wuhan Open	NH	A	LQ
British Open	A	A	1R
English Open	A	LQ	LQ
Shenzhen Open (Note: The event was called the Xi'an Grand Prix (2025/2026))	NH	LQ	LQ
Northern Ireland Open	A	LQ	LQ
International Championship	NH	LQ	LQ
UK Championship	A	LQ	LQ
Shoot Out	A	1R	
Scottish Open	A	LQ	LQ
German Masters	A	LQ	LQ
Welsh Open	A	LQ	
World Grand Prix	DNQ	DNQ	
Players Championship	DNQ	DNQ	
World Open	NH	LQ	
Tour Championship	DNQ	DNQ	
World Championship	A	LQ	
Former ranking tournaments
Saudi Arabia Masters	NH	1R	NH
Former non-ranking tournaments
Six-red World Championship	RR	Not Held	

Performance Table Legend
LQ	lost in the qualifying draw	#R	lost in the early rounds of the tournament (WR = Wildcard round, RR = Round robin)	QF	lost in the quarter-finals
SF	lost in the semi-finals	F	lost in the final	W	won the tournament
DNQ	did not qualify for the tournament	A	did not participate in the tournament	WD	withdrew from the tournament

NH / Not Held	means an event was not held.
NR / Non-Ranking Event	means an event is/was no longer a ranking event.
R / Ranking Event	means an event is/was a ranking event.
MR / Minor-Ranking Event	means an event is/was a minor-ranking event.

== Career finals ==
=== Amateur finals: 3 (2 titles) ===
Outcome	No.	Year	Championship	Opponent in the final	Score
Winner	1.	2022	African Six-reds Championship	Mohamed Hammouda (EGY)	6–4
Runner-up	2.	2025	African Six-reds Championship	Mutalieb Allie (ZAF)	4–6
Winner	3.	2025	All-Africa Snooker Championship	Yassine Bellamine (MAR)	6–1
