= 2009 Grand Prix (snooker) =

Grand Prix

Tournament information
- Dates: 3–11 October 2009
- Venue: Kelvin Hall
- City: Glasgow
- Country: Scotland
- Organisation: WPBSA
- Format: Ranking event
- Total prize fund: £502,100
- Winner's share: £75,000
- Highest break: Mark Williams (WAL) (142)

Final
- Champion: Neil Robertson (AUS)
- Runner-up: Ding Junhui (CHN)
- Score: 9–4

The 2009 Grand Prix was a professional ranking tournament that took place 3–11 October 2009 at the Kelvin Hall in Glasgow, Scotland.

Neil Robertson won in the final 9–4 against Ding Junhui.

== Prize fund ==
The breakdown of prize money for this year is shown below:

- Winner: £75,000
- Runner-up: £35,000
- Semi-finals: £20,000
- Quarter-finals: £12,000
- Last 16: £9,550
- Last 32: £7,100
- Last 48: £4,650
- Last 64: £2,200
- Stage one highest break: £500
- Stage two highest break: £4,000
- Stage one maximum break: £1,000
- Stage two maximum break: £20,000

== Main draw ==
The draw for round one was made on the evening of 24 September 2009 at Pontins in Prestatyn and was streamed live by 110sport.com. The draw from round two up to and including the semi-finals was made on a random basis.

The order of play and table numbers for all matches up to the semi-finals was determined once the draw for that round was made and published by the Tournament Director.

All matches up to and including the quarter-finals were best of 9 frames, the semi-finals were best of 11 frames and the final was the best of 17 frames. (Seedings in parentheses, all times are BST.)

=== Last 32 ===
- Saturday, 3 October – 13:00
  - (Scotland) John Higgins (1) 5–1 (England) Mark Joyce
  - (Hong Kong) Marco Fu (8) 4–5 (England) Mark Davis
- Saturday, 3 October – 19:00
  - (England) Mark Selby (7) 3–5 (Republic of Ireland) Ken Doherty
  - (England) Joe Perry (12) 5–2 (Scotland) Marcus Campbell
- Sunday, 4 October – 12:30
  - (England) Ali Carter (5) 1–5 (England) Robert Milkins
  - (China) Ding Junhui (13) 5–4 (Wales) Matthew Stevens
- Sunday, 4 October – 19:00
  - (Wales) Ryan Day (6) 3–5 (England) Jamie Cope
  - (Australia) Neil Robertson (9) 5–3 (Northern Ireland) Gerard Greene
- Monday, 5 October – 13:30
  - (Scotland) Stephen Hendry (10) 5–2 (England) Matthew Selt
  - (England) Peter Ebdon (14) 5–2 (China) Liang Wenbo
- Monday, 5 October – 19:00
  - (England) Shaun Murphy (4) 4–5 (England) Barry Pinches
  - (Northern Ireland) Mark Allen (11) 5–3 (England) Ian McCulloch
- Tuesday, 6 October – 13:30
  - (England) Ronnie O'Sullivan (2) 5–3 (Scotland) Jamie Burnett
  - (Wales) Mark Williams (15) 5–0 (England) Stuart Bingham
- Tuesday, 6 October – 19:00
  - (Scotland) Stephen Maguire (3) 5–3 (England) Nigel Bond
  - (England) Mark King (16) 5–4 (England) Ricky Walden

=== Last 16 ===
- Wednesday, 7 October – 14:00
  - (England) Ronnie O'Sullivan (2) 4–5 (Scotland) John Higgins (1)
  - (England) Jamie Cope 3–5 (Northern Ireland) Mark Allen (11)
- Wednesday, 7 October – 19:00
  - (Australia) Neil Robertson (9) 5–2 (Republic of Ireland) Ken Doherty
  - (England) Joe Perry (12) 5–2 (England) Barry Pinches
- Thursday, 8 October – 13:30
  - (Wales) Mark Williams (15) 5–2 (Scotland) Stephen Hendry (10)
  - (England) Peter Ebdon (14) 5–3 (England) Mark Davis
- Thursday, 8 October – 19:00
  - (Scotland) Stephen Maguire (3) 1–5 (China) Ding Junhui (13)
  - (England) Robert Milkins 5–1 (England) Mark King (16)

=== Quarter-finals ===
- Friday, 9 October – 13:30
  - (Scotland) John Higgins (1) 5–1 (Northern Ireland) Mark Allen (11)
  - (England) Joe Perry (12) 1–5 (Australia) Neil Robertson (9)
- Friday, 9 October – 19:00
  - (England) Peter Ebdon (14) 2–5 (China) Ding Junhui (13)
  - (Wales) Mark Williams (15) 5–2 (England) Robert Milkins

=== Semi-finals ===
- Saturday, 10 October – 13:00
  - (Scotland) John Higgins (1) 5–6 (Australia) Neil Robertson (9)
- Saturday, 10 October – 19:30
  - (Wales) Mark Williams (15) 1–6 (China) Ding Junhui (13)

== Final ==
Final: Best of 17 frames. Referee: Jan Verhaas. Kelvin Hall, Glasgow, Scotland, 11 October 2009.
Neil Robertson (9); Australia	9–4	Ding Junhui (13); China
Afternoon: 124–0 (124), 97–24, 43–72, 35–84 (80), 0–118 (112), 108–13 (108), 66–5; Evening: 20–95, 77–52, 73–5, 79–34, 60–21, 89–10 (89)
124	Highest break	112
2	Century breaks	1
3	50+ breaks	2

== Qualifying ==
These matches took place from 21 to 24 September 2009 at Pontins in Prestatyn, Wales.

Round 1 Best of 9 frames
(England) Chris Norbury	2
(England) Andrew Norman	5
(China) Li Hang	5
(Republic of Ireland) Brendan O'Donoghue	4
(Northern Ireland) Patrick Wallace	5
(China) Mei Xiwen	0
(Belgium) Bjorn Haneveer	5
(Wales) Ian Preece	2
(China) Xiao Guodong	1
(England) Joe Jogia	5
(England) Lee Page	1
(Malta) Tony Drago	5
(England) Lee Spick	0
(England) David Gray	5
(England) Matthew Couch	5
(England) Jimmy Robertson	1
(Thailand) Noppadol Sangnil	1
(Wales) Michael White	5
(Thailand) Atthasit Mahitthi	4
(Thailand) Thepchaiya Un-Nooh	5
(Wales) Daniel Wells	5
(England) Sam Baird	2
(England) Stephen Rowlings	5
(Thailand) James Wattana	1
(England) Craig Steadman	4
(Scotland) Mark Boyle	5
(England) Simon Bedford	5
(Republic of Ireland) David Hogan	4
(England) Matthew Selt	5
(Northern Ireland) Jordan Brown	4
(England) Ben Woollaston	3
(China) Zhang Anda	5

Round 2 Best of 9 frames
(England) Mark Joyce	5
(England) Andrew Norman	2
(England) David Roe	4
(China) Li Hang	5
(Republic of Ireland) Joe Delaney	2
(Northern Ireland) Patrick Wallace	5
(China) Liu Song	5
(Belgium) Bjorn Haneveer	4
(England) Tom Ford	5
(England) Joe Jogia	1
(England) Andy Hicks	3
(Malta) Tony Drago	5
(England) Peter Lines	5
(England) David Gray	4
(England) Robert Milkins	5
(England) Matthew Couch	1
(Republic of Ireland) David Morris	5
(Wales) Michael White	3
(England) Rod Lawler	5
(Thailand) Thepchaiya Un-Nooh	3
(England) Barry Pinches	5
(Wales) Daniel Wells	2
(England) David Gilbert	5
(England) Stephen Rowlings	4
(Wales) Paul Davies	5
(Scotland) Mark Boyle	4
(England) John Parrott	5
(England) Simon Bedford	4
(England) Jimmy White	2
(England) Matthew Selt	5
(China) Jin Long	2
(China) Zhang Anda	5

Round 3 Best of 9 frames
(Republic of Ireland) Michael Judge	4
(England) Mark Joyce	5
(England) Mark Davis	5
(China) Li Hang	3
(England) Adrian Gunnell	5
(Northern Ireland) Patrick Wallace	2
(Scotland) Jamie Burnett	5
(China) Liu Song	4
(Scotland) Marcus Campbell	5
(England) Tom Ford	3
(England) Mike Dunn	5
(Malta) Tony Drago	2
(England) Martin Gould	4
(England) Peter Lines	5
(England) Andrew Higginson	1
(England) Robert Milkins	5
(England) Rory McLeod	4
(Republic of Ireland) David Morris	5
(Scotland) Alan McManus	4
(England) Rod Lawler	5
(England) Jimmy Michie	3
(England) Barry Pinches	5
(England) Anthony Hamilton	0
(England) David Gilbert	5
(Republic of Ireland) Ken Doherty	5
(Wales) Paul Davies	4
(England) Ian McCulloch	5
(England) John Parrott	4
(England) Stuart Pettman	4
(England) Matthew Selt	5
(Wales) Dominic Dale	5
(China) Zhang Anda	0

Round 4 Best of 9 frames
(England) Barry Hawkins	3
(England) Mark Joyce	5
(England) Steve Davis	0
(England) Mark Davis	5
(England) Ricky Walden	5
(England) Adrian Gunnell	2
(Scotland) Graeme Dott	0
(Scotland) Jamie Burnett	5
(England) Judd Trump	3
(Scotland) Marcus Campbell	5
(Wales) Matthew Stevens	5
(England) Mike Dunn	1
(England) Nigel Bond	5
(England) Peter Lines	3
(England) Stephen Lee	3
(England) Robert Milkins	5
(England) Jamie Cope	5
(Republic of Ireland) David Morris	3
(Northern Ireland) Gerard Greene	5
(England) Rod Lawler	1
(England) Michael Holt	4
(England) Barry Pinches	5
(England) Stuart Bingham	5
(England) David Gilbert	2
(England) Dave Harold	1
(Republic of Ireland) Ken Doherty	5
(Northern Ireland) Joe Swail	4
(England) Ian McCulloch	5
(Republic of Ireland) Fergal O'Brien	3
(England) Matthew Selt	5
(China) Liang Wenbo	5
(Wales) Dominic Dale	3

== Century breaks ==
=== Televised stage centuries ===
- 142 – Mark Williams
- 135 – John Higgins
- 135 – Peter Ebdon
- 134 – Ryan Day
- 131, 126 – Ronnie O'Sullivan
- 130, 128, 124, 114, 108, 103, 100 – Neil Robertson
- 116 – Stephen Hendry
- 112, 107, 105, 103 – Ding Junhui
- 109 – Barry Pinches
- 105 – Ken Doherty
- 104 – Marcus Campbell

=== Qualifying stage centuries ===
- 140 – Atthasit Mahitthi
- 137 – Joe Jogia
- 135 – Marcus Campbell
- 129, 115, 107 – David Gilbert
- 125 – Tom Ford
- 123, 117 – Liang Wenbo
- 123 – Matthew Selt
- 116 – Michael Judge
- 115 – Adrian Gunnell
- 113 – Fergal O'Brien
- 109 – Jamie Cope
- 106 – Martin Gould
- 106 – Mark Davis
- 104 – Bjorn Haneveer
- 103 – Simon Bedford
- 102 – Daniel Wells
- 101 – Robert Milkins
- 100 – Jamie Burnett
