= 2013 World Snooker Championship =

Professional snooker tournament

2013 Betfair World Snooker Championship

Tournament information
- Dates: 20 April – 6 May 2013
- Venue: Crucible Theatre
- City: Sheffield
- Country: England
- Organisation: World Snooker
- Format: Ranking event
- Total prize fund: £1,111,000
- Winner's share: £250,000
- Highest break: Neil Robertson (AUS) (143)

Final
- Champion: Ronnie O'Sullivan (ENG)
- Runner-up: Barry Hawkins (ENG)
- Score: 18–12

The 2013 World Snooker Championship (officially the 2013 Betfair World Snooker Championship) was a professional snooker tournament that took place from 20 April to 6 May 2013 at the Crucible Theatre in Sheffield, England. It was the 37th consecutive year the Crucible had hosted the World Snooker Championship; the 2013 event was the last ranking tournament of the 2012–13 snooker season. Sports betting company Betfair sponsored the event for the first time.

Despite having missed virtually the entire season, defending champion Ronnie O'Sullivan did not lose one session in the tournament and defeated Barry Hawkins 18–12 in the final to become a five-time World Champion, joining Steve Davis and Stephen Hendry as the only players to have successfully defended their titles at the Crucible. O'Sullivan broke Hendry's record of 127 career centuries at the Crucible, finishing the tournament with 131, and also became the first player to make six century breaks in a World Championship final. Of the 55 century breaks made during the event, Neil Robertson made the highest break, a 143, in his first-round loss to Robert Milkins.

== Overview ==
The World Snooker Championship is an annual cue sport tournament and the official professional world championship of the game of snooker. Since 1977, the Crucible Theatre in Sheffield has hosted the event. During the tournament, 32 professional players compete in one-on-one snooker matches in a single elimination format, each of which is played over several frames. The event's 32-player lineup is selected using the snooker world rankings and a pre-tournament qualification round. English player Ronnie O'Sullivan won the previous year's championship by defeating fellow countryman Ali Carter in the final 18–11. The winner of the 2013 event earned prize money of £250,000, from a pool of £1,111,000. Sports betting company Betfair sponsored the event for the first time in 2013.

=== Format ===
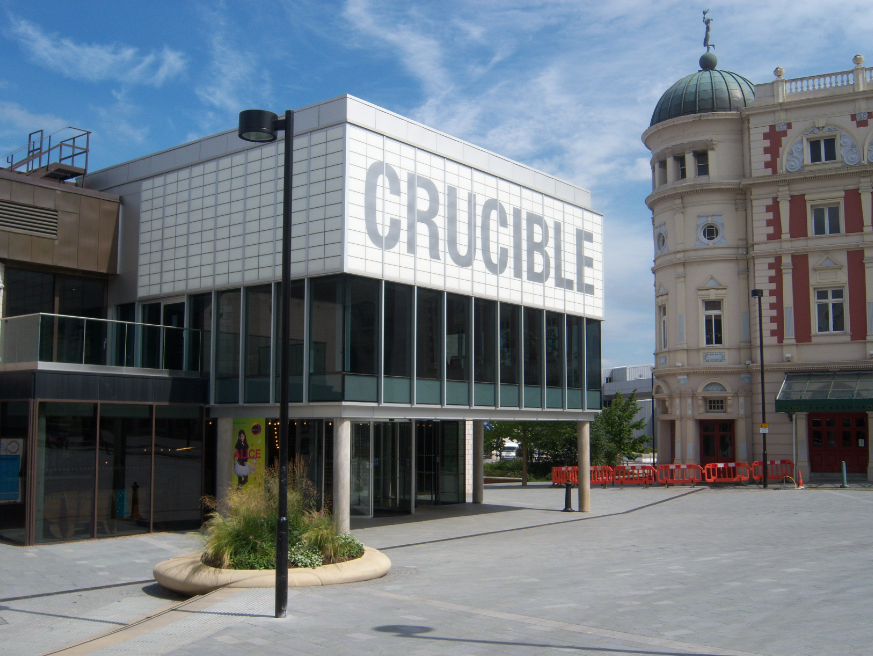
The main draw of the 2013 tournament was played at the Crucible Theatre in Sheffield, England.

The 2013 World Snooker Championship was held between 20 April and 6 May 2013 in Sheffield, England. It was the last of 11 rankings events in the 2012–13 snooker season on the World Snooker Tour. The tournament featured a 32-player main draw that took place at the Crucible Theatre and a 92-player qualifying draw that was played on 6 and 11 April 2015 at the English Institute of Sport. This was the 45th successive world championship to be contested using the knockout format after reverting from a challenge match system in the 1960s.

Ordinarily the top-16 players in the world rankings automatically qualified for the main draw as seeded players. Despite not playing a competitive event since the last world championship, Ronnie O'Sullivan was seeded first overall as the defending champion; the remaining 15 seeds were allocated using the latest world rankings, which were released after the China Open, the penultimate event of the season. The number of frames needed to win a match increased with each round of the main draw, starting with best-of-19-frames matches in the first round and ending with the final, which was played as a best-of-35-frames match.

=== Prize fund ===
The event had a prize fund of £1,111,000, of which the winner received £250,000. A breakdown of prize money for 2013 is shown below:

- Winner: £250,000
- Runner-up: £125,000
- Semi-final: £52,000
- Quarter-final: £24,050
- Last 16: £16,000
- Last 32: £12,000
- Last 48: £8,200
- Last 64: £4,600
- Non-televised highest break: £1,000
- Televised highest break: £10,000
- Total: £1,111,000

== Tournament summary ==
=== First round ===
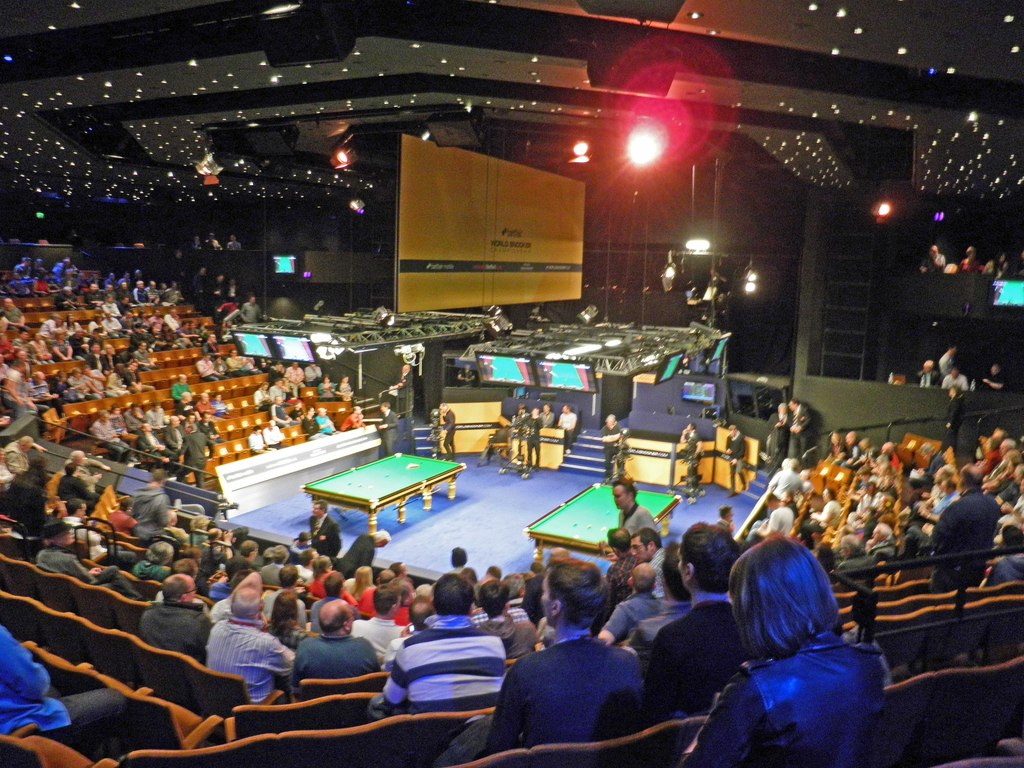
Interior of the Crucible Theatre before the third session of the first day

The first round was played between 20 and 25 April 2013; matches were held as the best-of-19 frames over two sessions. Players Jack Lisowski, Michael White, Ben Woollaston, Dechawat Poomjaeng, Matthew Selt and Sam Baird made their debuts at the main stages of the event. Poomjaeng was only the third player from Thailand, after James Wattana and Tai Pichit, to reach the event. Two of the debuting players progressed to the second round; Michael White advanced by defeating two-time champion Mark Williams 10–6, while Dechawat Poomjaeng advanced by beating Stephen Maguire 10–9.

Four Chinese players—a record for the event—had played in the 2012 competition but Ding Junhui was the only Chinese player to appear in 2013. Ding defeated Alan McManus 10–5 to reach the second round. Peter Ebdon was playing in his 22nd consecutive World Championship, equalling the number of consecutive appearances made by Steve Davis and putting him third for consecutive appearances behind Stephen Hendry on 27 and O'Sullivan on 26. In a repeat of the final of the 2006 event, Ebdon faced Graeme Dott; the match overran and was played over three sessions. Dott was ahead 8–6 after the second session and eventually won 10–6. The match lasted for more than seven hours; Ebdon had a high break of 37. Dott criticised Ebdon for his perceived slow play and called for a rule to limit the time a player could spend over a shot.

The ending of the match between defending champion Ronnie O'Sullivan and Marcus Campbell was not aired on the BBC, which instead broadcast a repeat episode of the 1970s sitcom Some Mothers Do 'Ave 'Em. The match was also unavailable on the BBC Red Button service, leading to viewers expressing their anger on social networks. The CEO of World Snooker Barry Hearn, apologised to fans on Twitter and wrote a formal letter of complaint to the BBC. O'Sullivan won the match 10–4; he had only played one competitive match in the minor-ranking PTC event since winning the title the year before. O'Sullivan said he wanted to "take some time off" and had refused to sign the player's contract for the following season.

Robert Milkins defeated the 2010 champion Neil Robertson 8–10. Robertson made the highest break of the event—a 143 in frame six—and led 5–2 but Milkins tied the match at 8–8 before winning the next two frames. In other matches, four-time champion John Higgins lost 6–10 to Mark Davis whilst former finalist Matthew Stevens lost 7–10 to qualifier Marco Fu.

=== Second round ===
The second round was played between 25 and 30 April as the best of 25 frames over three sessions. Shaun Murphy defeated Graeme Dott 13–11 after leading 6–2 after the first session. Dott's elimination meant there were no Scottish players in the last eight for the first time since 1988. Michael White reached his first ranking event quarter-final by defeating Poomjaeng 13–3 after two of the three scheduled sessions. In the fourth frame, Poomjaeng used the spider to bridge over the blue ball but missed a red ball on three occasions and forfeited the frame.

O'Sullivan became the first defending champion since Murphy in 2006 to reach the quarter-finals when he defeated Ali Carter, his opponent in the 2008 and 2012 World Championship finals, 13–8. Ricky Walden, in his first world championship second-round appearance, defeated Robert Milkins 13–11. Milkins trailed 3–9 but recovered to 10–11 and 11–12 but Walden won the frame he needed for victory. Barry Hawkins also reached his first Crucible quarter-final after defeating world number one Mark Selby 13–10.

=== Quarter-finals ===
The quarter-finals were played on 30 April and 1 May as best-of-25 frames matches over three sessions. In his match against Stuart Bingham, O'Sullivan won 11 of the first 12 frames and won the match 13–4 in the first frame of the third session. Judd Trump trailed 3–8 against Shaun Murphy but tied the score at 12–12 to force a deciding frame. The final frame lasted 53 minutes and was won by Trump. Ricky Walden defeated Michael White 13–6 and Hawkins defeated Ding Junhui 13–7, eliminating the two remaining non-English competitors from the tournament. Walden reached the semi-finals of the World Championship on his third attempt, despite not having previously won a match in his earlier appearances in the main stages of the event in 2009 and 2011.

=== Semi-finals ===
The semi-finals were played between 2 and 4 May 2013 over four sessions as the best-of-33 frames. This was the third semi-finals round in the modern history of snooker in which all of the players were English. O'Sullivan played Judd Trump in the first semi-final; in the 23rd frame, O'Sullivan received a reprimand from referee Michaela Tabb for allegedly making an obscene gesture with his cue. A World Snooker spokesman later stated eyewitnesses had also observed O'Sullivan making an inappropriate gesture but it was not captured on camera. O'Sullivan defeated Trump 17–11 and became the first defending champion to reach the final since Ken Doherty in 1998. In the other semi-final, Barry Hawkins trailed Ricky Walden 8–12 but won nine of the next eleven frames to win 17–14.

=== Final ===
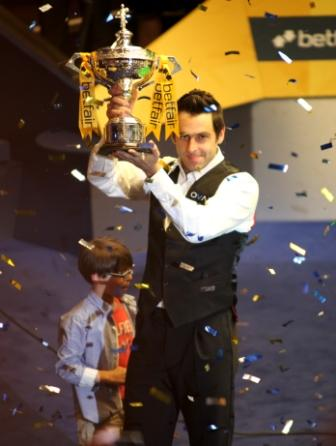
Ronnie O'Sullivan won a fifth championship, defeating Barry Hawkins 18–12.

The 2013 final between Ronnie O'Sullivan and Barry Hawkins was played on 5 and 6 May as the best-of-35 frames over four sessions and officiated by Jan Verhaas. O'Sullivan led 5–3 after the first session; Hawkins drew level at 7–7 but O'Sullivan won the last three frames of the day to take a 10–7 overnight lead. O'Sullivan's break of 103 in the 15th frame was his 128th century break at the Crucible Theatre, breaking Stephen Hendry's record of 127 Crucible centuries, and he extended the record to 131 century breaks. O'Sullivan won the third session by five frames to three to lead 15–10. O'Sullivan went on to win the final 18–12 to take his fifth world title and become the first defending champion to retain his title since Hendry in 1996 and the first player to score six century breaks in a world championship final.

Eight century breaks were scored in the final, equalling the record set in the 2002 final between Hendry and Peter Ebdon. At the age of 37, O'Sullivan became the oldest World Snooker Champion since 45-year-old Ray Reardon in 1978. This was O'Sullivan's fifth world championship but he did not rule out a similar season away from the tour, saying; "I had my year out and enjoyed my year out. I intend to play in some small events. Come December or January I'll have a better idea of what I'm going to do." As world champion, O'Sullivan was awarded a wild card place at the 2014 Masters, which he also won.

== Main draw ==
Shown below are the results for each round. The numbers in parentheses beside some of the players are their seeding ranks (each championship has 16 seeds and 16 qualifiers). The draw for the first round took place on 15 April 2013, one day after the qualifying, and was broadcast live by Talksport at 1:30 pm BST.

First round Best of 19 frames
20 April
Ronnie O'Sullivan (ENG) (1)	10
Marcus Campbell (SCO)	4
22 & 23 April
Ali Carter (ENG) (16)	10
Ben Woollaston (ENG)	4
24 & 25 April
Stuart Bingham (ENG) (9)	10
Sam Baird (ENG)	2
21 & 22 April
John Higgins (SCO) (8)	6
Mark Davis (ENG)	10
20 & 21 April
Shaun Murphy (ENG) (5)	10
Martin Gould (ENG)	5
21 & 22 April
Graeme Dott (SCO) (12)	10
Peter Ebdon (ENG)	6
23 & 24 April
Matthew Stevens (WAL) (13)	7
Marco Fu (HKG)	10
23 & 24 April
Judd Trump (ENG) (4)	10
Dominic Dale (WAL)	5
24 & 25 April
Neil Robertson (AUS) (3)	8
Robert Milkins (ENG)	10
20 & 21 April
Ricky Walden (ENG) (14)	10
Michael Holt (ENG)	1
20 & 21 April
Mark Williams (WAL) (11)	6
Michael White (WAL)	10
22 & 23 April
Stephen Maguire (SCO) (6)	9
Dechawat Poomjaeng (THA)	10
22 April
Mark Allen (NIR) (7)	8
Mark King (ENG)	10
23 & 24 April
Ding Junhui (CHN) (10)	10
Alan McManus (SCO)	5
20 & 21 April
Barry Hawkins (ENG) (15)	10
Jack Lisowski (ENG)	3
23 & 24 April
Mark Selby (ENG) (2)	10
Matthew Selt (ENG)	4

Second round Best of 25 frames
27, 28 & 29 April
(England) Ronnie O'Sullivan (1)	13
(England) Ali Carter (16)	8
28 & 29 April
(England) Stuart Bingham (9)	13
(England) Mark Davis	10
25 & 26 April
(England) Shaun Murphy (5)	13
(Scotland) Graeme Dott (12)	11
26 & 27 April
(Hong Kong) Marco Fu	7
(England) Judd Trump (4)	13
28 & 29 April
(England) Robert Milkins	11
(England) Ricky Walden (14)	13
25 & 26 April
(Wales) Michael White	13
(Thailand) Dechawat Poomjaeng	3
27, 28 & 29 April
(England) Mark King	9
(China) Ding Junhui (10)	13
26 & 27 April
(England) Barry Hawkins (15)	13
(England) Mark Selby (2)	10

Quarter-finals; Best of 25 frames
30 April & 1 May
(England) Ronnie O'Sullivan (1)	13
(England) Stuart Bingham (9)	4
30 April & 1 May
(England) Shaun Murphy (5)	12
(England) Judd Trump (4)	13
30 April & 1 May
(England) Ricky Walden (14)	13
(Wales) Michael White	6
30 April & 1 May
(China) Ding Junhui (10)	7
(England) Barry Hawkins (15)	13

Semi-finals; Best of 33 frames
2, 3 & 4 May
(England) Ronnie O'Sullivan (1)	17
(England) Judd Trump (4)	11
2, 3 & 4 May
(England) Ricky Walden (14)	14
(England) Barry Hawkins (15)	17

Final; Best of 35 frames
5 & 6 May
(England) Ronnie O'Sullivan (1)	18
(England) Barry Hawkins (15)	12

Final: (Best of 35 frames) Crucible Theatre, Sheffield, 5 & 6 May. Referee: Jan Verhaas.
Ronnie O'Sullivan (1); England				18–12			Barry Hawkins (15); England			
Session 1: 5–3
Frame	1	2	3	4	5	6	7	8	9	10
O'Sullivan	87^{†} (74)	92^{†} (92)	0	0	13	76^{†} (76)	113^{†} (113)	104^{†} (100)	N/A	N/A
Hawkins	4	10	98^{†} (88)	81^{†} (81)	101^{†} (50)	7	0	0	N/A	N/A
Session 2: 5–4
Frame	1	2	3	4	5	6	7	8	9	10
O'Sullivan	0	83^{†}	9	75^{†}	0	4	103^{†} (103)	117^{†} (106)	69^{†}	N/A
Hawkins	73^{†}	37	61^{†}	0	91^{†} (83)	133^{†} (133)	0	5	62	N/A
Session 3: 5–3
Frame	1	2	3	4	5	6	7	8	9	10
O'Sullivan	36	134^{†} (54, 76)	57^{†} (55)	0	133^{†} (133)	75^{†} (67)	38	124^{†} (124)	N/A	N/A
Hawkins	71^{†}	0	56	90^{†} (90)	0	49	87^{†}	7	N/A	N/A
Session 4: 3–2
Frame	1	2	3	4	5	6	7	8	9	10
O'Sullivan	0	18	77^{†} (77)	89^{†} (88)	89^{†} (86)	N/A	N/A	N/A	N/A	N/A
Hawkins	131^{†} (127)	76^{†} (66)	25	8	1	N/A	N/A	N/A	N/A	N/A
133				Highest break			133			
6				Century breaks			2			
???				50+ breaks			???			
Numbers in parentheses indicate breaks of 50 or more. † = Winner of frame

== Qualifying ==
=== Preliminary qualifying ===
Four preliminary qualifying rounds for the tournament were for invited amateur players and members not on the Main Tour; they took place on 4 and 5 April 2013 at the World Snooker Academy in Sheffield. Names in bold denote match winners.

Round 1

(England) Ali Bassiri	0–**5**	(England) **Surinder Gill**
(England) Del Smith	4–**5**	(England) **Ian Barry Stark**
(England) **Paul Wykes**	**5**–2	(Finland) Robin Hull
(England) **Stephen Ormerod**	**5**–0	(Republic of Ireland) Bill Kelly

Round 2

(England) **Andrew Norman**	**5**–1	(England) Philip Minchin
(England) **Les Dodd**	**5**–4	(England) Surinder Gill
(Republic of Ireland) David Morris	1–**5**	(Northern Ireland) **Joe Swail**
(England) **Stephen Rowlings**	**5**–4	(England) Ian Barry Stark
(England) **Justin Astley**	**5**–2	(England) Tony Knowles
(India) Lucky Vatnani	3–**5**	(England) **Paul Wykes**
(India) David Singh	2–**5**	(Wales) **Tony Chappel**
(Northern Ireland) **Patrick Wallace**	**5**–0	(England) Stephen Ormerod

Round 3

(England) Andrew Norman	1–**5**	(England) **Les Dodd**
(Northern Ireland) **Joe Swail**	**5**–2	(England) Stephen Rowlings
(England) **Justin Astley**	**5**–2	(England) Paul Wykes
(Wales) Tony Chappel	1–**5**	(Northern Ireland) **Patrick Wallace**

Round 4

(England) Les Dodd	1–**5**	(Northern Ireland) **Joe Swail**
(England) **Justin Astley**	**5**–2	(Northern Ireland) Patrick Wallace

=== Main qualifying ===
The first three qualifying rounds for the tournament took place between 6 and 11 April 2013 at the English Institute of Sport in Sheffield,. The final round of qualifying took place between 13 and 14 April 2013 at the same venue.

**Round 1** Best of 19 frames
(Thailand) **Thepchaiya Un-Nooh**	**10**
(Scotland) Scott Donaldson	6
(China) **Zhang Anda**	**10**
(Thailand) Passakorn Suwannawat	6
(Thailand) **Thanawat Thirapongpaiboon**	**10**
(England) Jamie O'Neill	8
(England) **Michael Wasley**	**10**
(England) Sean O'Sullivan	6
(Thailand) **Dechawat Poomjaeng**	**10**
(Scotland) Michael Leslie	4
(India) Pankaj Advani	8
(Northern Ireland) **Joe Swail**	**10**
(Malta) **Tony Drago**	**10**
(Egypt) Mohamed Khairy	3
(India) **Aditya Mehta**	**10**
(Wales) Daniel Wells	7
(Belgium) Luca Brecel	6
(Scotland) **Fraser Patrick**	**10**
(England) Robbie Williams	7
(China) **Li Yan**	**10**
(England) **Ian Burns**	**10**
(England) Joel Walker	8
(England) **Liam Highfield**	**10**
(England) Simon Bedford	6
(China) Chen Zhe	7
(England) **Sam Baird**	**10**
(England) **Paul Davison**	**10**
(England) Justin Astley	8
(England) **Craig Steadman**	**10**
(England) David Grace	9
(China) **Tian Pengfei**	**10**
(England) Martin O'Donnell	5

**Round 2** Best of 19 frames
(Northern Ireland) Gerard Greene	4
(Thailand) **Thepchaiya Un-Nooh**	**10**
(China) Cao Yupeng	7
(China) **Zhang Anda**	**10**
(England) Mike Dunn	6
(Thailand) **Thanawat Thirapongpaiboon**	**10**
(Thailand) **James Wattana**	**10**
(England) Michael Wasley	7
(China) Liu Chuang	9
(Thailand) **Dechawat Poomjaeng**	**10**
(England) Adam Duffy	6
(Northern Ireland) **Joe Swail**	**10**
(England) Andy Hicks	7
(Malta) **Tony Drago**	**10**
(Scotland) **Alan McManus**	**10**
(India) Aditya Mehta	9
(England) **Rod Lawler**	**10**
(Scotland) Fraser Patrick	5
(England) **Jimmy Robertson**	**10**
(China) Li Yan	2
(China) **Yu Delu**	**10**
(England) Ian Burns	2
(England) Barry Pinches	9
(England) **Liam Highfield**	**10**
(England) Peter Lines	9
(England) **Sam Baird**	**10**
(England) **Alfie Burden**	**10**
(England) Paul Davison	7
(Norway) **Kurt Maflin**	**10**
(England) Craig Steadman	6
(England) **Jimmy White**	**10**
(China) Tian Pengfei	7

**Round 3** Best of 19 frames
(England) **Ben Woollaston**	**10**
(Thailand) Thepchaiya Un-Nooh	3
(Wales) **Michael White**	**10**
(China) Zhang Anda	5
(England) **Matthew Selt**	**10**
(Thailand) Thanawat Thirapongpaiboon	8
(England) **Jack Lisowski**	**10**
(Thailand) James Wattana	4
(England) Anthony Hamilton	4
(Thailand) **Dechawat Poomjaeng**	**10**
(England) **Mark Joyce**	**10**
(Northern Ireland) Joe Swail	7
(England) **Dave Gilbert**	**10**
(Malta) Tony Drago	8
(England) Nigel Bond	8
(Scotland) **Alan McManus**	**10**
(Scotland) Anthony McGill	9
(England) **Rod Lawler**	**10**
(China) **Liang Wenbo**	**10**
(England) Jimmy Robertson	3
(Scotland) Jamie Burnett	6
(China) **Yu Delu**	**10**
(Wales) Jamie Jones	9
(England) **Liam Highfield**	**10**
(England) Rory McLeod	9
(England) **Sam Baird**	**10**
(England) Dave Harold	9
(England) **Alfie Burden**	**10**
(England) Steve Davis	7
(Norway) **Kurt Maflin**	**10**
(China) Xiao Guodong	4
(England) **Jimmy White**	**10**

**Round 4** Best of 19 frames
(Wales) Ryan Day	9
(England) **Ben Woollaston**	**10**
(England) Andrew Higginson	4
(Wales) **Michael White**	**10**
(Republic of Ireland) Ken Doherty	9
(England) **Matthew Selt**	**10**
(Republic of Ireland) Fergal O'Brien	4
(England) **Jack Lisowski**	**10**
(England) Jamie Cope	3
(Thailand) **Dechawat Poomjaeng**	**10**
(England) **Michael Holt**	**10**
(England) Mark Joyce	7
(Hong Kong) **Marco Fu**	**10**
(England) Dave Gilbert	6
(England) Tom Ford	5
(Scotland) **Alan McManus**	**10**
(England) **Martin Gould**	**10**
(England) Rod Lawler	7
(England) **Mark Davis**	**10**
(China) Liang Wenbo	6
(England) **Mark King**	**10**
(China) Yu Delu	9
(Scotland) **Marcus Campbell**	**10**
(England) Liam Highfield	4
(England) Joe Perry	3
(England) **Sam Baird**	**10**
(Wales) **Dominic Dale**	**10**
(England) Alfie Burden	5
(England) **Peter Ebdon**	**10**
(Norway) Kurt Maflin	8
(England) **Robert Milkins**	**10**
(England) Jimmy White	5

== Century breaks ==
=== Main stage centuries ===
A total of 55 century breaks were made during the main stage of the World Championship. Neil Robertson, the player who compiled the highest break of the tournament, received a cue stick made of gold.

- 143 – Neil Robertson
- 142, 127, 118, 117, 112, 109, 104 – Judd Trump
- 140, 119, 113, 106, 105, 104 – Ricky Walden
- 133, 133, 125, 124, 113, 111, 106, 106, 105, 104, 103, 102, 100 – Ronnie O'Sullivan
- 133, 127, 114, 104, 100 – Barry Hawkins
- 131, 129, 114, 107, 104, 103 – Ding Junhui
- 128, 128, 112, 112, 106 – Shaun Murphy
- 117 – Marco Fu
- 111, 106 – Stuart Bingham
- 106, 104 – Robert Milkins
- 106 – Ali Carter
- 103 – Mark Selby
- 102, 101, 100 – Michael White
- 100 – Graeme Dott
- 100 – Jack Lisowski

=== Qualifying stage centuries ===
A total of 63 century breaks were made during the qualifying stage of the World Championship:

- 142, 133, 113, 104 – Sam Baird
- 140, 122, 117, 100 – Yu Delu
- 139 – Ryan Day
- 138, 117, 100 – Ben Woollaston
- 138, 103 – Matthew Selt
- 137 – Robin Hull
- 136, 120, 104 – Michael White
- 131, 128, 114, 100 – Jack Lisowski
- 131, 102 – Patrick Wallace
- 131 – Dominic Dale
- 130 – Jimmy White
- 129 – Thepchaiya Un-Nooh
- 128 – Ken Doherty
- 128 – Joe Perry
- 124 – Michael Wasley
- 123, 121 – Mike Dunn
- 122 – Anthony Hamilton
- 117, 113, 101, 100 – Kurt Maflin
- 115, 103 – Mark Davis
- 115 – Justin Astley
- 114, 105, 102 – Liam Highfield
- 114, 101 – Tony Drago
- 112, 100 – Joel Walker
- 110, 109 – Mark King
- 108 – Marco Fu
- 106 – Thanawat Thirapongpaiboon
- 105, 100 – Joe Swail
- 105 – Craig Steadman
- 103 – Alfie Burden
- 103 – Barry Pinches
- 103 – Daniel Wells
- 103 – Liang Wenbo
- 102 – Dave Gilbert
- 102 – Alan McManus
- 102 – Paul Wykes
- 100 – Pankaj Advani
- 100 – Cao Yupeng
