= 2010 Shanghai Masters =

Roewe Shanghai Masters

Tournament information
- Dates: 6–12 September 2010
- Venue: Shanghai Grand Stage
- City: Shanghai
- Country: China
- Organisation: World Snooker
- Format: Ranking event
- Total prize fund: £325,000
- Winner's share: £60,000
- Highest break: Stuart Bingham (ENG) (142)

Final
- Champion: Ali Carter (ENG)
- Runner-up: Jamie Burnett (SCO)
- Score: 10–7

The 2010 Roewe Shanghai Masters was a professional ranking snooker tournament that took place between 6–12 September 2010 at the Shanghai Grand Stage in Shanghai, China. It was the fourth edition of the tournament since it was first held in 2007.

Ronnie O'Sullivan was the defending champion, but he withdrew for personal reasons.

Ali Carter won in the final 10–7 against Jamie Burnett.

== Prize fund ==
The breakdown of prize money for this year is shown below:

- Winner: £60,000
- Runner-up: £30,000
- Semi-final: £15,000
- Quarter-final: £8,000
- Last 16: £5,925
- Last 32: £4,000
- Last 48: £2,200
- Last 64: £1,500
- Stage one highest break: £400
- Stage two highest break: £2,000
- Total: £325,000

== Wildcard round ==
These matches were played in Shanghai on 6 September 2010.

Match		Score	
WC1	Jamie Burnett (SCO)	5–2	Tian Pengfei (CHN)
WC2	Andrew Higginson (ENG)	5–2	Rouzi Maimaiti (CHN)
WC3	Ken Doherty (IRL)	5–4	Muhammad Sajjad (PAK)
WC4	Robert Milkins (ENG)	3–5	Jin Long (CHN)
WC5	Dave Harold (ENG)	5–1	Passakorn Suwannawat (THA)
WC6	Mike Dunn (ENG)	1–5	Mei Xiwen (CHN)
WC7	Martin Gould (ENG)	5–3	Li Hang (CHN)
WC8	Joe Delaney (IRL)	5–1	Li Yan (CHN)

== Main draw ==
Last 32; Best of 9 frames
1	(England) Ronnie O'Sullivan	w/d
(Scotland) Jamie Burnett	w/o
11	(Wales) Ryan Day	3
(England) Andrew Higginson	5
13	(Hong Kong) Marco Fu	4
(England) Mark Davis	5
5	(Scotland) Stephen Maguire	5
(England) Judd Trump	3
7	(Wales) Mark Williams	5
(England) Ricky Walden	3
12	(Scotland) Graeme Dott	5
(Republic of Ireland) Ken Doherty	4
16	(England) Jamie Cope	5
(England) Steve Davis	3
4	(China) Ding Junhui	5
(China) Jin Long	4
3	(England) Ali Carter	5
(England) Dave Harold	3
9	(Northern Ireland) Mark Allen	2
(England) Stuart Bingham	5
15	(China) Liang Wenbo	3
(Wales) Matthew Stevens	5
6	(England) Shaun Murphy	5
(England) Stephen Lee	3
8	(England) Mark Selby	5
(China) Mei Xiwen	2
10	(Scotland) Stephen Hendry	2
(England) Martin Gould	5
14	(England) Mark King	5
(Republic of Ireland) Joe Delaney	3
2	(Australia) Neil Robertson	4
(England) Peter Ebdon	5

Last 16; Best of 9 frames
(Scotland) Jamie Burnett	5
(England) Andrew Higginson	0
(England) Mark Davis	5
5	(Scotland) Stephen Maguire	3
7	(Wales) Mark Williams	4
12	(Scotland) Graeme Dott	5
16	(England) Jamie Cope	5
4	(China) Ding Junhui	1
3	(England) Ali Carter	5
(England) Stuart Bingham	3
(Wales) Matthew Stevens	5
6	(England) Shaun Murphy	2
8	(England) Mark Selby	5
(England) Martin Gould	4
14	(England) Mark King	5
(England) Peter Ebdon	3

Quarter-finals; Best of 9 frames
(Scotland) Jamie Burnett	5
(England) Mark Davis	4
12	(Scotland) Graeme Dott	2
16	(England) Jamie Cope	5
3	(England) Ali Carter	5
(Wales) Matthew Stevens	4
8	(England) Mark Selby	5
14	(England) Mark King	1

Semi-finals; Best of 11 frames
(Scotland) Jamie Burnett	6
16	(England) Jamie Cope	1
3	(England) Ali Carter	6
8	(England) Mark Selby	2

Final; Best of 19 frames
(Scotland) Jamie Burnett	7
3	(England) Ali Carter	10

== Final ==
Final: Best of 19 frames. Referee: Jan Verhaas. Shanghai Grand Stage, Shanghai, China, 12 September 2010.
Jamie Burnett; Scotland	7–10	Ali Carter (3); England
Afternoon: 25–76, 67–43, 70–47 (51), 7–60, 43–70 (62), 71–0 (57), 65–23, 1–71 (71), 48–63; Evening: 15–61, 71–70 (Carter 52), 0–78 (72), 60–37, 17–55, 64–52, 31–68 (64), 26–78
57	Highest break	72
0	Century breaks	0
2	50+ breaks	5

== Qualifying ==
These matches took place between 2 and 5 August 2010 at the World Snooker Academy in Sheffield, England.

Round 1 Best of 9 frames
(England) Jack Lisowski	3
(Scotland) James McBain	5
(England) Reanne Evans	1
(England) Alfie Burden	5
(England) Justin Astley	3
(Thailand) Thanawat Thirapongpaiboon	5
(England) Matthew Couch	5
(Wales) Andrew Pagett	2
(England) Paul Davison	1
(China) Xiao Guodong	5
(England) Jamie O'Neill	4
(Brazil) Igor Figueiredo	5
(Scotland) Anthony McGill	5
(Thailand) Issara Kachaiwong	4
(England) Joe Jogia	5
(Thailand) Noppon Saengkham	0
(Northern Ireland) Patrick Wallace	5
(England) Adam Wicheard	1
(England) Ben Woollaston	3
(China) Liu Song	5
(China) Zhang Anda	5
(Wales) Jak Jones	4
(Wales) Jamie Jones	5
(England) Kuldesh Johal	2
(England) Kyren Wilson	5
(Norway) Kurt Maflin	2
(England) Liam Highfield	5
(Northern Ireland) Dermot McGlinchey	3
(England) Simon Bedford	2
(Germany) Patrick Einsle	5
(Wales) Michael White	5
(China) Liu Chuang	2

Round 2 Best of 9 frames
(England) Jimmy Robertson	4
(Scotland) James McBain	5
(England) Matthew Selt	4
(England) Alfie Burden	5
(England) Mark Joyce	4
(Thailand) Thanawat Thirapongpaiboon	5
(Belgium) Bjorn Haneveer	0
(England) Matthew Couch	5
(Malta) Tony Drago	5
(China) Xiao Guodong	2
(England) David Gilbert	4
(Brazil) Igor Figueiredo	5
(England) Barry Pinches	5
(Scotland) Anthony McGill	4
(England) Peter Lines	5
(England) Joe Jogia	2
(Republic of Ireland) David Morris	5
(Northern Ireland) Patrick Wallace	3
(Thailand) James Wattana	5
(China) Liu Song	3
(Wales) Paul Davies	1
(China) Zhang Anda	5
(England) Jimmy Michie	2
(Wales) Jamie Jones	5
(England) Andy Hicks	5
(England) Kyren Wilson	1
(England) Jimmy White	3
(England) Liam Highfield	5
(Republic of Ireland) Joe Delaney	5
(Germany) Patrick Einsle	2
(Republic of Ireland) Michael Judge	2
(Wales) Michael White	5

Round 3 Best of 9 frames
(Scotland) Jamie Burnett	5
(Scotland) James McBain	1
(Scotland) Marcus Campbell	3
(England) Alfie Burden	5
(England) Nigel Bond	1
(Thailand) Thanawat Thirapongpaiboon	5
(England) Tom Ford	5
(England) Matthew Couch	0
(England) Anthony Hamilton	5
(Malta) Tony Drago	3
(Republic of Ireland) Fergal O'Brien	5
(Brazil) Igor Figueiredo	1
(England) Rod Lawler	5
(England) Barry Pinches	1
(England) Robert Milkins	5
(England) Peter Lines	4
(England) Ian McCulloch	5
(Republic of Ireland) David Morris	2
(Northern Ireland) Joe Swail	5
(Thailand) James Wattana	1
(England) Stuart Pettman	3
(China) Zhang Anda	5
(England) Adrian Gunnell	1
(Wales) Jamie Jones	5
(Scotland) Alan McManus	3
(England) Andy Hicks	5
(England) Martin Gould	5
(England) Liam Highfield	3
(England) Rory McLeod	1
(Republic of Ireland) Joe Delaney	5
(Wales) Dominic Dale	1
(Wales) Michael White	5

Round 4 Best of 9 frames
(England) Michael Holt	1
(Scotland) Jamie Burnett	5
(England) Andrew Higginson	5
(England) Alfie Burden	4
(England) Mark Davis	5
(Thailand) Thanawat Thirapongpaiboon	4
(England) Judd Trump	5
(England) Tom Ford	1
(England) Ricky Walden	5
(England) Anthony Hamilton	2
(Republic of Ireland) Ken Doherty	5
(Republic of Ireland) Fergal O'Brien	4
(England) Steve Davis	5
(England) Rod Lawler	0
(England) Joe Perry	1
(England) Robert Milkins	5
(England) Dave Harold	5
(England) Ian McCulloch	4
(England) Stuart Bingham	5
(Northern Ireland) Joe Swail	2
(Wales) Matthew Stevens	5
(China) Zhang Anda	2
(England) Stephen Lee	5
(Wales) Jamie Jones	2
(England) Mike Dunn	5
(England) Andy Hicks	0
(England) Barry Hawkins	4
(England) Martin Gould	5
(Northern Ireland) Gerard Greene	2
(Republic of Ireland) Joe Delaney	5
(England) Peter Ebdon	5
(Wales) Michael White	1

== Century breaks ==
=== Qualifying stage centuries ===
- 138 – Liam Highfield
- 136 – Jamie Burnett
- 135, 100 – Jamie Jones
- 132 – Andrew Higginson
- 129 – Xiao Guodong
- 120 – Peter Lines
- 114 – Thanawat Thirapongpaiboon
- 114 – Liu Song
- 111 – Liu Chuang
- 111 – Judd Trump
- 111 – Joe Delaney
- 109 – David Morris
- 107 – Tony Drago
- 105 – Matthew Couch
- 105 – Joe Swail
- 104 – Anthony McGill
- 103 – Tom Ford
- 103 – Kyren Wilson
- 101, 100 – Michael White
- 101 – Matthew Stevens

=== Televised stage centuries ===
- 142 – Stuart Bingham
- 135, 102 – Judd Trump
- 131 – Jamie Burnett
- 130 – Tian Pengfei
- 129, 103 – Ali Carter
- 114 – Shaun Murphy
- 109 – Ken Doherty
- 106, 105 – Mark Selby
- 106 – Dave Harold
- 105, 102 – Mark Davis
- 101 – Marco Fu
- 101 – Martin Gould
- 100 – Mei Xiwen
- 100 – Stephen Maguire
- 100 – Jamie Cope
- 100 – Mark King
