= 2010 Welsh Open (snooker) =

2010 Totesport.com Welsh Open

Tournament information
- Dates: 25–31 January 2010
- Venue: Newport Centre
- City: Newport
- Country: Wales
- Organisation: WPBSA
- Format: Ranking event
- Total prize fund: £225,500
- Winner's share: £35,000
- Highest break: John Higgins (SCO) (138)

Final
- Champion: John Higgins (SCO)
- Runner-up: Ali Carter (ENG)
- Score: 9–4

The 2010 Welsh Open (officially the 2010 Totesport.com Welsh Open) was a professional ranking snooker tournament that took place between 25 and 31 January 2010 at the Newport Centre in Newport, Wales. This was the first time that the Welsh Open was sponsored by Totesport.com.

John Higgins won in the final 9–4 against defending champion Ali Carter.

== Prize fund ==
The breakdown of prize money for this year is shown below:

- Winner: £35,000
- Runner-up: £17,500
- Semi-final: £8,750
- Quarter-final: £6,500
- Last 16: £4,275
- Last 32: £2,700
- Last 48: £1,725
- Last 64: £1,325
- Stage one highest break: £500
- Stage two highest break: £2,000
- Stage one maximum break: £1,000
- Stage two maximum break: £20,000
- Total: £225,500

== Main draw ==
Last 32; Best of 9 frames
1	(England) Ali Carter	5
(England) Mark Davis	1
9	(Australia) Neil Robertson	5
(China) Liu Song	2
10	(Scotland) Stephen Hendry	5
(England) Dave Harold	1
6	(Wales) Ryan Day	5
(Malta) Tony Drago	4
8	(Hong Kong) Marco Fu	2
(England) Andrew Higginson	5
15	(Wales) Mark Williams	5
(Republic of Ireland) Fergal O'Brien	2
14	(England) Peter Ebdon	0
(England) Barry Hawkins	5
4	(Scotland) Stephen Maguire	5
(Wales) Dominic Dale	4
3	(England) Ronnie O'Sullivan	5
(England) Stuart Bingham	1
13	(China) Ding Junhui	3
(England) Jamie Cope	5
11	(Northern Ireland) Mark Allen	5
(England) Tom Ford	2
5	(England) Shaun Murphy	4
(Wales) Matthew Stevens	5
7	(England) Mark Selby	5
(England) Judd Trump	2
16	(England) Mark King	5
(Scotland) Marcus Campbell	1
12	(England) Joe Perry	3
(Scotland) Graeme Dott	5
2	(Scotland) John Higgins	5
(Republic of Ireland) Michael Judge	2

Last 16; Best of 9 frames
1	(England) Ali Carter	5
9	(Australia) Neil Robertson	2
10	(Scotland) Stephen Hendry	3
6	(Wales) Ryan Day	5
(England) Andrew Higginson	0
15	(Wales) Mark Williams	5
(England) Barry Hawkins	1
4	(Scotland) Stephen Maguire	5
3	(England) Ronnie O'Sullivan	5
(England) Jamie Cope	0
11	(Northern Ireland) Mark Allen	5
(Wales) Matthew Stevens	2
7	(England) Mark Selby	5
16	(England) Mark King	3
(Scotland) Graeme Dott	1
2	(Scotland) John Higgins	5

Quarter-finals; Best of 9 frames
1	(England) Ali Carter	5
6	(Wales) Ryan Day	2
15	(Wales) Mark Williams	1
4	(Scotland) Stephen Maguire	5
3	(England) Ronnie O'Sullivan	5
11	(Northern Ireland) Mark Allen	2
7	(England) Mark Selby	2
2	(Scotland) John Higgins	5

Semi-finals; Best of 11 frames
1	(England) Ali Carter	6
4	(Scotland) Stephen Maguire	3
3	(England) Ronnie O'Sullivan	4
2	(Scotland) John Higgins	6

Final; Best of 17 frames
1	(England) Ali Carter	4
2	(Scotland) John Higgins	9

== Final ==
Final: Best of 17 frames. Referee: Brendan Moore; Newport Centre, Newport, Wales, 31 January 2010.
Ali Carter (1); England	4–9	John Higgins (2); Scotland
Afternoon: 0–128 (95), 1–101 (101), 24–78 (71), 0–137 (137), 48–81 (81), 81–13, 27–94 (59), 72–54 (66, 54); Evening: 33–72 (72), 90–0 (60), 73–72 (73, 72), 49–76, 1–76 (76)
73	Highest break	137
0	Century breaks	2
3	50+ breaks	10

== Qualifying ==
These matches took place between 19 and 22 January 2010 at the Pontin's Centre, Prestatyn, Wales.

Round 1 Best of 9 frames
(England) Lee Page	5
(Republic of Ireland) David Hogan	3
(England) Ben Woollaston	3
(England) Joe Jogia	5
(Wales) Daniel Wells	4
(Thailand) James Wattana	5
(England) Simon Bedford	3
(Malta) Tony Drago	5
(England) Lee Spick	1
(England) Jimmy Robertson	5
(China) Li Hang	5
(Wales) Ian Preece	4
(England) Chris Norbury	4
(Northern Ireland) Jordan Brown	5
(England) Matthew Selt	5
(England) David Gray	3
(Belgium) Bjorn Haneveer	5
(England) Andrew Norman	1
(Thailand) Atthasit Mahitthi	w/o
(Scotland) Mark Boyle	w/d
(England) Stephen Rowlings	5
(China) Mei Xiwen	4
(Northern Ireland) Patrick Wallace	5
(Republic of Ireland) Brendan O'Donoghue	2
(England) Craig Steadman	5
(England) Sam Baird	3
(England) Matthew Couch	2
(China) Zhang Anda	5
(China) Xiao Guodong	5
(Wales) Michael White	2
(Thailand) Noppadol Sangnil	4
(Thailand) Thepchaiya Un-Nooh	5

Round 2 Best of 9 frames
(England) Andy Hicks	5
(England) Lee Page	2
(China) Liu Song	5
(England) Joe Jogia	0
(England) Robert Milkins	5
(Thailand) James Wattana	3
(England) Peter Lines	2
(Malta) Tony Drago	5
(England) David Gilbert	5
(England) Jimmy Robertson	3
(China) Jin Long	3
(China) Li Hang	5
(England) Jimmy White	5
(Northern Ireland) Jordan Brown	1
(England) Rod Lawler	0
(England) Matthew Selt	5
(England) John Parrott	2
(Belgium) Bjorn Haneveer	5
(Republic of Ireland) David Morris	5
(Thailand) Atthasit Mahitthi	1
(England) Tom Ford	5
(England) Stephen Rowlings	2
(England) Barry Pinches	5
(Northern Ireland) Patrick Wallace	1
(England) David Roe	2
(England) Craig Steadman	5
(England) Mark Joyce	4
(China) Zhang Anda	5
(Republic of Ireland) Joe Delaney	2
(China) Xiao Guodong	5
(Wales) Paul Davies	4
(Thailand) Thepchaiya Un-Nooh	5

Round 3 Best of 9 frames
(England) Mark Davis	5
(England) Andy Hicks	1
(England) Adrian Gunnell	2
(China) Liu Song	5
(England) Stuart Pettman	5
(England) Robert Milkins	4
(England) Jimmy Michie	2
(Malta) Tony Drago	5
(England) Andrew Higginson	5
(England) David Gilbert	3
(England) Mike Dunn	4
(China) Li Hang	5
(England) Ian McCulloch	5
(England) Jimmy White	4
(Wales) Dominic Dale	5
(England) Matthew Selt	1
(England) Anthony Hamilton	5
(Belgium) Bjorn Haneveer	4
(Scotland) Alan McManus	5
(Republic of Ireland) David Morris	4
(Scotland) Jamie Burnett	4
(England) Tom Ford	5
(England) Martin Gould	4
(England) Barry Pinches	5
(England) Rory McLeod	5
(England) Craig Steadman	3
(Scotland) Marcus Campbell	5
(China) Zhang Anda	2
(Republic of Ireland) Ken Doherty	5
(China) Xiao Guodong	1
(Republic of Ireland) Michael Judge	5
(Thailand) Thepchaiya Un-Nooh	1

Round 4 Best of 9 frames
(Northern Ireland) Joe Swail	4
(England) Mark Davis	5
(England) Michael Holt	1
(China) Liu Song	5
(England) Dave Harold	5
(England) Stuart Pettman	3
(Northern Ireland) Gerard Greene	2
(Malta) Tony Drago	5
(England) Stephen Lee	3
(England) Andrew Higginson	5
(Republic of Ireland) Fergal O'Brien	5
(China) Li Hang	4
(England) Barry Hawkins	5
(England) Ian McCulloch	2
(England) Steve Davis	2
(Wales) Dominic Dale	5
(England) Stuart Bingham	5
(England) Anthony Hamilton	3
(England) Jamie Cope	5
(Scotland) Alan McManus	2
(England) Ricky Walden	4
(England) Tom Ford	5
(Wales) Matthew Stevens (Note: Match was held over and played in Newport.)	5
(England) Barry Pinches	4
(England) Judd Trump	5
(England) Rory McLeod	4
(England) Nigel Bond	1
(Scotland) Marcus Campbell	5
(Scotland) Graeme Dott	5
(Republic of Ireland) Ken Doherty	3
(China) Liang Wenbo	3
(Republic of Ireland) Michael Judge	5

== Century breaks ==
=== Qualifying stage centuries ===
- 143 – Craig Steadman
- 138 – Li Hang
- 133 – Liu Song
- 127 – Judd Trump
- 125 – Stephen Rowlings
- 125 – Fergal O'Brien
- 123 – Jimmy White
- 119 – Dominic Dale
- 119 – Tony Drago
- 115 – Sam Baird
- 110 – Tom Ford
- 110 – Stuart Bingham
- 106, 103 – Matthew Selt
- 106 – Ken Doherty
- 105 – Paul Davies
- 103 – Alan McManus
- 102 – David Gilbert
- 102 – Jamie Cope
- 101 – Mark Davis

=== Televised stage centuries ===
- 138, 137, 109, 105, 101 – John Higgins
- 134 – Ding Junhui
- 129 – Neil Robertson
- 129 – Joe Perry
- 123 – Jamie Cope
- 122 – Andrew Higginson
- 122 – Ronnie O'Sullivan
- 120, 115 – Ali Carter
- 115 – Mark Selby
- 113 – Stephen Hendry
- 112, 102 – Mark Williams
- 109, 106 – Matthew Stevens
- 105 – Marco Fu
- 102 – Fergal O'Brien
