= 2011 World Snooker Championship =

Professional snooker tournament

2011 Betfred.com World Snooker Championship

Tournament information
- Dates: 16 April – 2 May 2011
- Venue: Crucible Theatre
- City: Sheffield
- Country: England
- Organisation: World Snooker
- Format: Ranking event
- Total prize fund: £1,111,000
- Winner's share: £250,000
- Highest break: Ding Junhui (CHN) (138); Mark King (ENG) (138)

Final
- Champion: John Higgins (SCO)
- Runner-up: Judd Trump (ENG)
- Score: 18–15

The 2011 World Snooker Championship (officially the 2011 Betfred.com World Snooker Championship) was a professional snooker tournament that took place between 16 April and 2 May 2011 at the Crucible Theatre in Sheffield, England. It was the 35th consecutive year that the World Snooker Championship had been held at the Crucible and was the last ranking event of the 2010–11 snooker season. The event was organised by the World Professional Billiards and Snooker Association and had a total prize fund of £1,111,000, with £250,000 going to the winner of the event. The tournament was sponsored by sports betting company Betfred.

Neil Robertson was the defending champion, but lost 8–10 against Judd Trump in the first round. Trump became the youngest player since 1990 to reach the final where he lost to John Higgins. This was Higgins' fourth world title, becoming only the fourth man to win four or more championships in the modern era. Ding Junhui meanwhile became the first player from China to reach the semi-finals. Mark King and Ding Junhui made the highest breaks at the Crucible with 138; while James Wattana compiled the highest break of the tournament during qualifying with 141.

An audience of 3.93 million viewers watched the fourth session in Great Britain with 2.03 million watching the third session of the final. The second and fourth sessions of the final were the most watched programmes on BBC Two for their particular weeks. Viewing figures on the BBC peaked at 6.6 million viewers. The figure of 3.9 million who watched the final session was up 50% on the year before. It was estimated that nearly half of the UK population watched the tournament at some point. In China, Ding Junhui's semi-final had an average watch of 19.4 million with a peak audience of 30 million over seven television networks. A record number of fans bought tickets, with the last four days and other sessions sold out with sales up 15% on 2010.

== Overview ==
The World Snooker Championship is an annual cue sport tournament and the official world championship of the game of snooker. Invented in the late 19th century by British Army soldiers stationed in India, the sport was popular in Great Britain. In modern times it has been played worldwide, especially in East and Southeast Asian nations such as China, Hong Kong and Thailand.

In the 2011 tournament, 32 professional players competed in one-on-one snooker matches played over several frames, using a single-elimination tournament format. The 32 players were selected for the event using the snooker world rankings and a pre-tournament qualification competition. In 1927, the first world championship was won by Joe Davis. The event's final took place in Camkin's Hall, Birmingham, England. Since 1977, the event has been held at the Crucible Theatre in Sheffield, England. The event was organised by the World Professional Billiards and Snooker Association. Australian Neil Robertson was the defending champion, having defeated Graeme Dott 18–13 in the previous year's final. The event was sponsored by sports betting company Betfred.

=== Format ===
The 2011 World Snooker Championship took place from 16 April to 2 May 2011 in Sheffield, England. The tournament was the last of eight ranking events in the 2010–11 snooker season on the World Snooker Tour. It featured a 32-player main draw that was held at the Crucible Theatre, as well as a qualifying draw that was played at the World Snooker Academy in Sheffield from 3 to 13 March. This was the 35th consecutive year that the tournament had been staged at the Crucible. The main stages of the event were broadcast by the BBC in the United Kingdom.

The top 16 players in the latest world rankings automatically qualified for the main draw as seeded players. (Note: In the event of the defending champion being ranked outside the top 16, he would replace the player ranked world number 16 as an automatic qualifier.) Robertson was seeded first overall as the defending champion, and the remaining 15 seeds were allocated based on the latest world rankings. The number of frames required to win a match increased throughout the tournament. The first round consisted of best-of-19-frames matches, with the final match being played over a maximum of 35 frames. All 16 non-seeded spots in the main draw were filled with players from the qualifying rounds.

=== Prize fund ===
For the 2011 tournament there was a £1,111,000 prize fund with the winner receiving £250,000. World Snooker offered no additional prize money for a maximum break, whereas in previous years the prize money for this achievement was £147,000. The breakdown of prize money for this year is shown below:

- Winner: £250,000
- Runner-up: £125,000
- Semi-final: £52,000
- Quarter-final: £24,050
- Last 16: £16,000
- Last 32: £12,000
- Last 48: £8,200
- Last 64: £4,600
- Stage one highest break: £1,000
- Stage two highest break: £10,000
- Total: £1,111,000

== Tournament summary ==
=== Opening rounds (first round—quarter-finals) ===
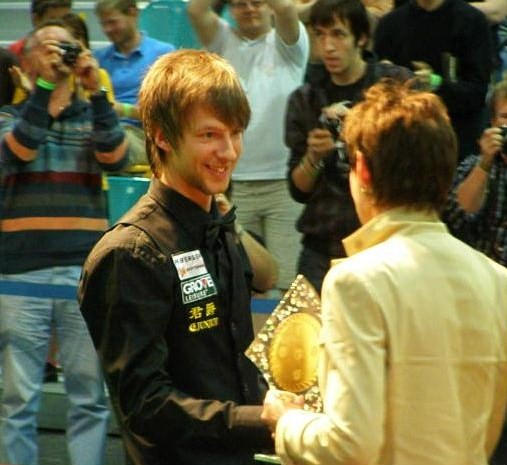
Judd Trump (pictured in 2010), defeated the defending champion Neil Robertson 10–8 in the opening round

The first round was played from 16 to 21 April as the best of 19 frames held over two sessions. Defending champion Neil Robertson led Judd Trump 7–6, but lost the match 8–10. Trump, having recently won the 2011 China Open, commented "I'm on a high at the moment and I don't want it to finish. I want to make winning a habit". There were two debutants at the main stages of the event: Andrew Pagett and Jimmy Robertson. This was also the first time that either had qualified for the main draw of a ranking tournament. Both players lost their opening round match, as Pagett lost 7–10 against Jamie Cope and Jimmy Robertson lost 1–10 against Mark Selby.

Both Barry Hawkins and Rory McLeod reached the second round of the World Championship for the first time. Hawkins defeated Stephen Maguire on a deciding frame 10–9 and McLeod defeated Ricky Walden 10–6. Ronnie O'Sullivan attempted to withdraw from the event one week before it started, but later, when asked for a written confirmation, changed his decision. He compiled his 100th century break at the venue in his first round match against Dominic Dale, as he won 10–2. Previous winner Graeme Dott led Mark King 7–3, but was reduced to a 7–6 lead. Dott won three of the next four frames to complete a 10–7 victory. Seven-time winner Hendry defeated Joe Perry 10–9 on a deciding frame, but hinted that he might retire after the event. In total, five out of the sixteen seeded players lost their first round matches: Neil Robertson, Maguire, Walden, Marco Fu and Peter Ebdon. Fu lost 8–10 against Martin Gould and Ebdon lost 8–10 against Stuart Bingham.

The second round was played as the best of 25 frames, held over three sessions. Selby made six century breaks during his 13–4 victory over Hendry. This was the first time six century breaks had been made in a match at the event, and also for a best of 25 frames match at any event. Trump defeated Gould 13–6, with his opponent considering him to be a favourite to win the event, and Trump commenting "I feel I've got the game to go out and win it". Dott and Carter were tied at 11–11 in their second round match, before Dott won the next two frames to complete a 13–11 victory. Ding came back from 9–12 to defeat Stuart Bingham on a deciding frame. This was the first time that he had qualified for the quarter-finals of the world championships. Eleventh seed Mark Allen also went to a deciding frame, as he defeated Hawkins 13–12. In a long eight-hour match, John Higgins overcame Rory McLeod 13–7.

The quarter-finals were played as the best of 25 frames. Mark Williams defeated Allen 13–5 to reach the semi-finals of the World Championship for the first time since winning the 2003 World Snooker Championship. Trump, rated an 80–1 outsider at the beginning of the tournament, defeated previous year's runner up Dott 13–5 to reach the semi-finals. Ding won his match 13–10 against Selby to become the third Asian player to reach the semi-finals of the world championship, following James Wattana and Fu. As a result of Selby's exit, Williams became the new world number one after the event. O'Sullivan led Higgins 8–5 in their quarter-final match, but won just two of the next ten frames, as Higgins won the match 13–10. O'Sullivan commented "I had enough chances to win, more than I expected. I just didn't take them", whilst Higgins suggested that O'Sullivan missing was the only way he could have won the match.

=== Later rounds (semi-finals—final) ===
The semi-finals were played as the best of 33 frames, held over four sessions. Trump defeated Ding 17–15 to become the second youngest player (after Hendry in 1990) to reach the final of the event. Trump also reached his second consecutive ranking final after winning the China Open at the start of the month. In China, the second session of the match drew a peak audience of nearly 30 million viewers and averaging over 19 million, with the World Professional Billiards and Snooker Association claiming it was the highest rated sports programme of 2011 up to that point; however, the Women's Tennis Association claimed that the women's singles final of the Australian Open held earlier in the year drew an audience of 60 million viewers on Chinese television. Williams led Higgins 5–3 after the first session, and maintained his lead after the second session, which ended 9–7. Higgins, however, then won six of the next eight frames, to lead 13–11 after the third session. Higgins won the match 17–14 to reach his third final in five years. During the 28th frame Higgins was heckled by a member of the audience, "How did you swallow that £300,000, John? ... You're a disgrace to snooker." in reference to the News of the World allegations the previous year of match fixing, for which the heckler was later ejected from the venue. Higgins had only returned from a six-month suspension due to the incident in November.

The final was played as the best of 35 frames, held over four sessions. The final was contested between Higgins and Trump, and officiated by Jan Verhaas, who was taking charge of his fourth World Championship final. Ted Lowe, BBC commentator for many years and the deviser of the long-running snooker programme Pot Black, died at the age of 90 on the morning of 1 May. Before the start of the final that day, a minute's applause in honour of Lowe took place. After the first session was tied at four frames all, Trump won the second session 6–3 to take a 10–7 lead into the second day's play. Higgins took a 13–12 lead after the third session of the final, which he won 6–2. Trump levelled the match at 14–14, before Higgins won four of the last five frames to win the match 18–15.

This was Higgins 24th ranking title, and the fourth time he had won the event. Only Ray Reardon, Steve Davis and Hendry had won the event as many times. Higgins complemented Trump "He was the better player. He was playing a brand of snooker I have never seen before in my life." The pair would also contest the 2019 World Snooker Championship final, with Trump winning 18–9. The highest break of the tournament was 138 made by both Ding and King. This was the first time since 1987 that the highest break of the tournament was lower than 140, when it was 127 made by Davis.

== Main draw ==
Below is the full draw for the main stage of the tournament. The numbers in brackets denote player seeding, whilst those in bold denote match winners. The draw for the first round took place on 21 March 2011, one day after the Players Tour Championship Finals.

**First round** Best of 19 frames
16 April
(Australia) Neil Robertson (1)	8
(England) **Judd Trump**	**10**
19 & 20 April
(Hong Kong) Marco Fu (16)	8
(England) **Martin Gould**	**10**
19 & 20 April
(Scotland) **Graeme Dott (9)**	**10**
(England) Mark King	7
16 & 17 April
(England) **Ali Carter (8)**	**10**
(England) Dave Harold	3
17 & 18 April
(China) **Ding Junhui (5)**	**10**
(Scotland) Jamie Burnett	2
18 & 19 April
(England) Peter Ebdon (12)	8
(England) **Stuart Bingham**	**10**
17 & 18 April
(Scotland) **Stephen Hendry (13)**	**10**
(England) Joe Perry	9
20 & 21 April
(England) **Mark Selby (4)**	**10**
(England) Jimmy Robertson	1
16 & 17 April
(Wales) **Mark Williams (3)**	**10**
(Wales) Ryan Day	5
16 & 17 April
(England) **Jamie Cope (14)**	**10**
(Wales) Andrew Pagett	7
19 & 20 April
(Northern Ireland) **Mark Allen (11)**	**10**
(Wales) Matthew Stevens	9
18 April
(Scotland) Stephen Maguire (6)	9
(England) **Barry Hawkins**	**10**
16 & 17 April
(England) **Shaun Murphy (7)**	**10**
(Scotland) Marcus Campbell	1
18 & 19 April
(England) **Ronnie O'Sullivan (10)**	**10**
(Wales) Dominic Dale	2
19 & 20 April
(England) Ricky Walden (15)	6
(England) **Rory McLeod**	**10**
20 & 21 April
(Scotland) **John Higgins (2)**	**10**
(England) Stephen Lee	5

**Second round** Best of 25 frames
21, 22 & 23 April
(England) **Judd Trump**	**13**
(England) Martin Gould	6
22 & 23 April
(Scotland) **Graeme Dott (9)**	**13**
(England) Ali Carter (8)	11
24 & 25 April
(China) **Ding Junhui (5)**	**13**
(England) Stuart Bingham	12
23, 24 & 25 April
(Scotland) Stephen Hendry (13)	4
(England) **Mark Selby (4)**	**13**
21 & 22 April
(Wales) **Mark Williams (3)**	**13**
(England) Jamie Cope (14)	4
22 & 23 April
(Northern Ireland) **Mark Allen (11)**	**13**
(England) Barry Hawkins	12
23, 24 & 25 April
(England) Shaun Murphy (7)	10
(England) **Ronnie O'Sullivan (10)**	**13**
24 & 25 April
(England) Rory McLeod	7
(Scotland) **John Higgins (2)**	**13**

**Quarter-finals**; Best of 25 frames
26 & 27 April
(England) **Judd Trump**	**13**
(Scotland) Graeme Dott (9)	5
26 & 27 April
(China) **Ding Junhui (5)**	**13**
(England) Mark Selby (4)	10
26 & 27 April
(Wales) **Mark Williams (3)**	**13**
(Northern Ireland) Mark Allen (11)	5
26 & 27 April
(England) Ronnie O'Sullivan (10)	10
(Scotland) **John Higgins (2)**	**13**

**Semi-finals**; Best of 33 frames
28, 29 & 30 April
(England) **Judd Trump**	**17**
(China) Ding Junhui (5)	15
28, 29 & 30 April
(Wales) Mark Williams (3)	14
(Scotland) **John Higgins (2)**	**17**

**Final**; Best of 35 frames
1 & 2 May
(England) Judd Trump	15
(Scotland) **John Higgins (2)**	**18**

**Final** (Best of 35 frames) Crucible Theatre, Sheffield, 1 & 2 May 2011. Referee: Jan Verhaas.
Judd Trump
England
15–**18**
**John Higgins** (2)
Scotland
**64**–19, **76**–1, 38–73, 54–75, 5–115, **113**–0, 68–69, **56**–19, 20–64, **67**–45, **68**–0, **127**–0, 38–63, 25–64, **77**–18, **60**–9, **69**–36, 8–64, **113**–0, 0–97, **99**–0, 55–65, 35–93, 1–113, 8–77, 38–66, **78**–0, **60**–38, 52–64, 35–65, **75**–52, 44–64, 61–62
Century breaks: 4
(Trump 3, Higgins 1)

Highest break by Trump: 104
Highest break by Higgins: 113

64–19, 76–1, 38–**73**, 54–**75**, 5–**115**, 113–0, 68–**69**, 56–19, 20–**64**, 67–45, 68–0, 127–0, 38–**63**, 25–**64**, 77–18, 60–9, 69–36, 8–**64**, 113–0, 0–**97**, 99–0, 55–**65**, 35–**93**, 1–**113**, 8–**77**, 38–**66**, 78–0, 60–38, 52–**64**, 35–**65**, 75–52, 44–**64**, 61–**62**
(Scotland) **John Higgins** wins the 2011 Betfred.com World Snooker Championship

== Qualifying ==
=== Preliminary qualifying ===
The preliminary qualifying rounds for the tournament took place on 3 March 2011 at the World Snooker Academy in Sheffield.

Round 1

(England) Sam Baird	5–1	(England) Colin Mitchell
(England) Tony Brown	2–5	(England) Ali Bassiri
(India) David Singh	4–5	(England) David Gray
(England) Ian Stark	5–2	(England) Paul Cavney
(England) Philip Minchin	0–5	(England) Stephen Rowlings
(England) Tony Knowles	4–5	(England) Del Smith
(England) Les Dodd	4–5	(England) Stephen Ormerod

Round 2

(England) Neil Selman	3–5	(England) Sam Baird
(England) Ali Bassiri	0–5	(England) David Gray
(England) Ian Stark	0–5	(England) Stephen Rowlings
(England) Del Smith	5–0	(England) Stephen Ormerod

=== Main qualifying ===
The qualifying rounds 1–4 for the tournament took place between 4 and 10 March 2011 at the World Snooker Academy in Sheffield. The final round of qualifying took place between 12 and 13 March 2011 at the same venue.

Round 1

(England) Reanne Evans	6–10	(England) Sam Baird
(Wales) Jak Jones	3–10	(England) Stephen Rowlings

Rounds 2–5

Round 2 Best of 19 frames
(England) Kyren Wilson	10
(Northern Ireland) Dermot McGlinchey	5
(China) Liu Song	10
(Republic of Ireland) Michael Judge	8
(Thailand) James Wattana	10
(England) Justin Astley	3
(Thailand) Thanawat Thirapongpaiboon	8
(England) Sam Baird	10
(Scotland) James McBain	10
(Thailand) Issara Kachaiwong	9
(Brazil) Igor Figueiredo	5
(Republic of Ireland) Joe Delaney	10
(China) Liu Chuang	10
(England) David Gray	3
(Republic of Ireland) David Morris	8
(England) David Gilbert	10
(England) Paul Davison	10
(England) Stephen Rowlings	5
(Northern Ireland) Patrick Wallace	10
(England) Del Smith	2
(Wales) Michael White	10
(England) Adam Wicheard	2
(England) Liam Highfield	8
(England) Kuldesh Johal	10
(England) Simon Bedford	10
(Thailand) Noppon Saengkham	3
(England) Ben Woollaston	10
(England) Jamie O'Neill	8
(Wales) Andrew Pagett	10
(China) Zhang Anda	6
(China) Xiao Guodong	10
(Norway) Kurt Maflin	9

Round 3 Best of 19 frames
(Northern Ireland) Joe Swail	6
(England) Kyren Wilson	10
(England) Adrian Gunnell	9
(China) Liu Song	10
(England) Andy Hicks	2
(Thailand) James Wattana	10
(England) Alfie Burden	7
(England) Sam Baird	10
(England) Ian McCulloch	5
(Scotland) James McBain	10
(England) Joe Jogia	10
(Republic of Ireland) Joe Delaney	4
(England) Jimmy White	9
(China) Liu Chuang	10
(England) Barry Pinches	7
(England) David Gilbert	10
(Scotland) Anthony McGill	7
(England) Paul Davison	10
(England) Rod Lawler	5
(Northern Ireland) Patrick Wallace	10
(England) Matthew Couch	3
(Wales) Michael White	10
(England) Jack Lisowski	10
(England) Kuldesh Johal	7
(Wales) Jamie Jones	10
(England) Simon Bedford	6
(England) Stuart Pettman	10
(England) Ben Woollaston	5
(Belgium) Bjorn Haneveer	4
(Wales) Andrew Pagett	10
(England) Jimmy Robertson	10
(China) Xiao Guodong	9

Round 4 Best of 19 frames
(England) Rory McLeod	10
(England) Kyren Wilson	3
(England) Mark Joyce	6
(China) Liu Song	10
(Scotland) Jamie Burnett	10
(Thailand) James Wattana	8
(England) Mike Dunn	10
(England) Sam Baird	9
(England) Michael Holt	10
(Scotland) James McBain	8
(England) Robert Milkins	10
(England) Joe Jogia	4
(England) Tom Ford	8
(China) Liu Chuang	10
(England) Peter Lines	6
(England) David Gilbert	10
(Republic of Ireland) Fergal O'Brien	10
(England) Paul Davison	4
(England) Matthew Selt	10
(Northern Ireland) Patrick Wallace	9
(England) Anthony Hamilton	10
(Wales) Michael White	7
(England) Steve Davis	10
(England) Jack Lisowski	9
(England) Dave Harold	10
(Wales) Jamie Jones	9
(Scotland) Alan McManus	10
(England) Stuart Pettman	8
(England) Nigel Bond	9
(Wales) Andrew Pagett	10
(Malta) Tony Drago	8
(England) Jimmy Robertson	10

Round 5 Best of 19 frames
(England) Mark Davis	5
(England) Rory McLeod	10
(England) Joe Perry	10
(China) Liu Song	6
(China) Liang Wenbo	7
(Scotland) Jamie Burnett	10
(England) Mark King	10
(England) Mike Dunn	5
(Wales) Dominic Dale	10
(England) Michael Holt	6
(England) Martin Gould	10
(England) Robert Milkins	6
(Wales) Ryan Day	10
(China) Liu Chuang	7
(England) Judd Trump	10
(England) David Gilbert	4
(Wales) Matthew Stevens	10
(Republic of Ireland) Fergal O'Brien	9
(Scotland) Marcus Campbell	10
(England) Matthew Selt	6
(England) Barry Hawkins	10
(England) Anthony Hamilton	5
(England) Stephen Lee	10
(England) Steve Davis	2
(Northern Ireland) Gerard Greene	9
(England) Dave Harold	10
(England) Stuart Bingham	10
(Scotland) Alan McManus	2
(England) Andrew Higginson	6
(Wales) Andrew Pagett	10
(Republic of Ireland) Ken Doherty	6
(England) Jimmy Robertson	10

== Century breaks ==
=== Televised stage centuries ===
There were 74 century breaks in the televised stage of the World Championship.

- 138, 128, 121, 119, 117, 114, 102 – Ding Junhui
- 138 – Mark King
- 137, 125, 115, 113, 109, 106, 105, 104, 103 – Mark Williams
- 135, 132, 131, 124, 123, 121, 120, 113, 101 – John Higgins
- 134, 101 – Stuart Bingham
- 133, 117, 114 – Stephen Hendry
- 129, 127, 125, 124, 117, 108, 107, 100 – Mark Selby
- 128, 119, 116, 115, 113, 105, 100 – Ronnie O'Sullivan
- 127, 100 – Neil Robertson
- 123, 122, 110, 108, 105, 104, 104, 103, 102, 102 – Judd Trump
- 122, 120, 111, 102 – Graeme Dott
- 117 – Barry Hawkins
- 115, 112, 104 – Ali Carter
- 115, 100 – Marco Fu
- 114, 103, 102, 100 – Mark Allen
- 101 – Stephen Lee
- 100 – Shaun Murphy

=== Qualifying stage centuries ===
There were 73 century breaks in the qualifying stage of the World Championship.

- 141 – James Wattana
- 135, 108, 106, 100 – Xiao Guodong
- 133, 125, 124, 120, 103 – Sam Baird
- 132, 129, 118, 118, 115 – Jamie Burnett
- 130, 114 – Kurt Maflin
- 130 – Rory McLeod
- 129 – David Gilbert
- 129 – Matthew Stevens
- 127 – Anthony McGill
- 127 – Liu Chuang
- 127, 122 – Ryan Day
- 126, 114 – Stuart Bingham
- 124 – Joe Swail
- 124 – Gerard Greene
- 123, 113 – Michael Holt
- 123, 101, 100 – Matthew Selt
- 122 – Ian McCulloch
- 121 – Jack Lisowski
- 119, 115, 100, 100 – Patrick Wallace
- 117 – Liu Song
- 116 – Andy Hicks
- 113, 112, 107 – Kuldesh Johal
- 113, 112 – David Gray
- 112 – Thanawat Thirapongpaiboon
- 112 – James McBain
- 112 – Tom Ford
- 111 – Jamie O'Neill
- 111 – Barry Pinches
- 111 – Jimmy Robertson
- 109, 103 – Paul Davison
- 109, 102 – Ken Doherty
- 108 – Stephen Rowlings
- 108, 101 – Dominic Dale
- 107, 105 – Michael White
- 106, 100 – Fergal O'Brien
- 105, 101 – Steve Davis
- 105 – Stephen Lee
- 103 – Anthony Hamilton
- 102 – Kyren Wilson
- 101 – Zhang Anda
- 101 – Mike Dunn
- 101 – Liang Wenbo
- 100 – Judd Trump
