= Zhang Anda =

Chinese snooker player (born 1991)

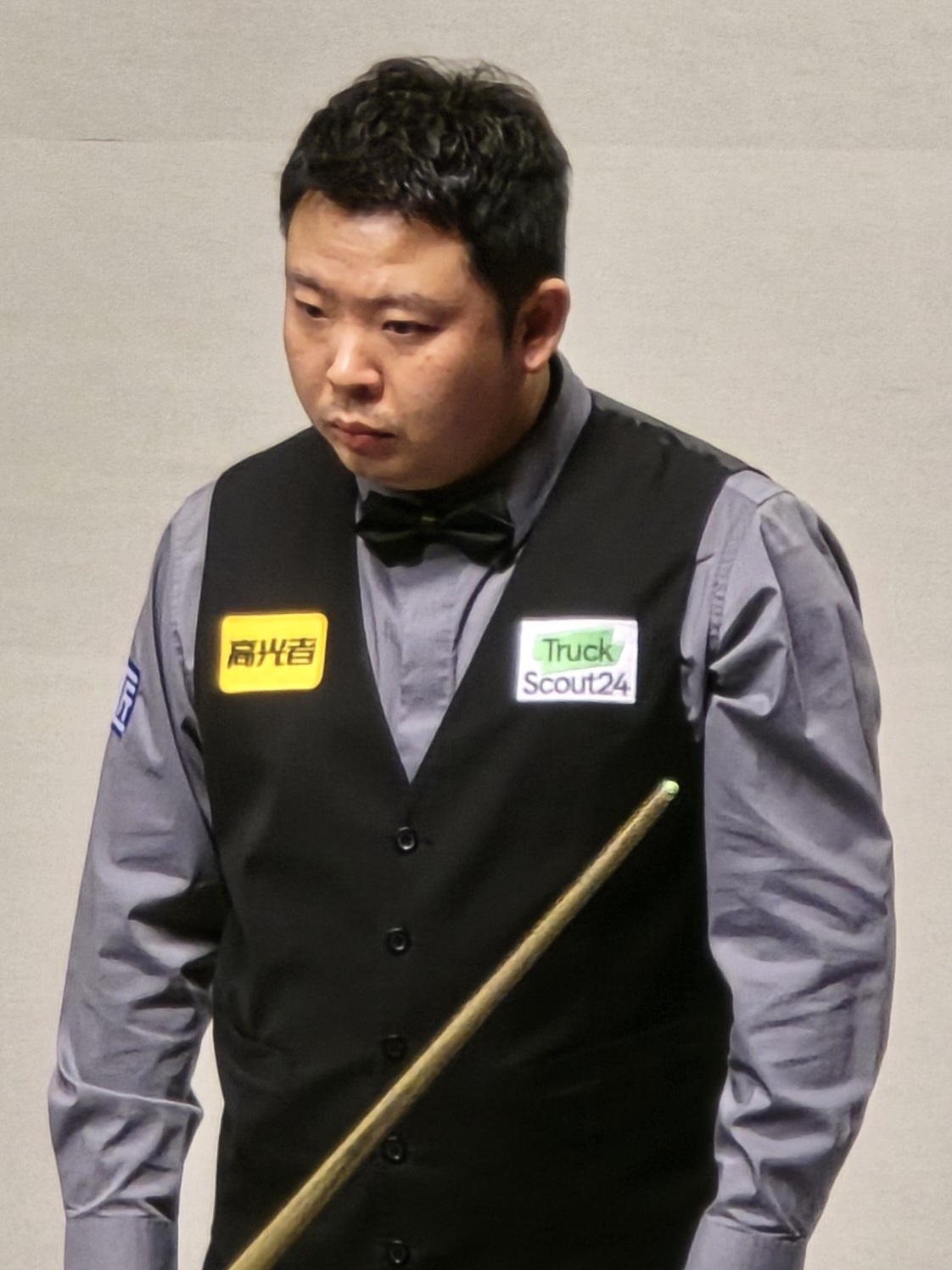
- Zhang Anda in the 2025 German Masters

Personal information
- Nickname: Mighty Mouse
- Born: December 25, 1991 (age 34) Shaoguan, Guangdong, China

Sport
- Country: China
- Sport: Snooker
- Professional: 2009–2011, 2012–2020, 2021–present
- Highest ranking: 10 (October 2024)
- Current ranking: 22 (as of 26 October 2026)
- Maximum breaks: 5
- Century breaks: 219 (as of 4 November 2026)

Tournament wins
- Ranking: 1

Zhang Anda
- Traditional Chinese: 張安達
- Simplified Chinese: 张安达
Transcriptions
Standard Mandarin
- Hanyu Pinyin: Zhāng Āndá
- Wade–Giles: Chang^{1} An^{1}ta^{2}
- IPA: [ʈʂáŋ ántǎ]
Yue: Cantonese
- Yale Romanization: Jēung Ōn Daaht
- Jyutping: Zoeng¹ On¹ Daat⁶

Zhang Anda (Chinese: 张安达; born 25 December 1991) is a Chinese professional snooker player, who made his debut on the Main Tour for the 2009–10 season. He qualified by winning the ACBS Asian Under-21 Championship. In November 2023 he won his first world ranking title by winning the International Championship.

Standing at 5 ft. 3 in. (160 cm) tall, he is nicknamed "Mighty Mouse". Zhang lives in Sheffield, England, during the snooker season and practises at the Victoria Snooker Academy.

== Career ==
=== 2009/2010 season ===
The 2009–10 season was Zhang's first professional season on the tour. His first match was a 2–5 defeat to Craig Steadman in the first qualifying round of the Shanghai Masters. His first wins came over Ben Woollaston (5–3) and Jin Long (5–2) during qualifying for the Grand Prix. He was then eliminated by Welshman Dominic Dale 0–5. He also reached the same stage in Welsh Open qualifying having beaten Matthew Couch 5–2 and Mark Joyce 5–4 before losing 2–5 to Marcus Campbell.

Zhang comfortably beat Craig Steadman 10–4 in his first match of World Championship qualifying, scoring his first century of the season in the penultimate frame. He then beat veteran John Parrott 10–6 in the next round. He made a second century, a 113, as he won the last five frames to progress. In the penultimate qualifying round, he beat Andrew Higginson 10–8 in a topsy turvy match. Zhang led 7–3 scoring a 114 in the process before Higginson went ahead 8–7. Zhang took the last three to go through to the final qualifying round. Ricky Walden, provisionally in the top 16 before the tournament, was Zhang's last obstacle to overcome. The first 16 frames were shared before a 134 break in frame 17 and a 103 break in frame 18 for Zhang resulted in a 10–8 victory. This meant that he would be only the fourth Chinese player to play at The Crucible and the lowest ranked player (number 71) to qualify for tournament. He is also one of only a few players to make it to The Crucible in their debut season. This result denied Walden a top 16 place for the following season. Zhang was drawn against seven-time World Snooker champion Stephen Hendry in the first round of the event. Zhang was 0–4 down in the match but rallied to trail only 4–5 after the first session. Hendry increased his lead to 7–5 before Zhang won four frames in a row to be on the cusp of a famous win. He wasted a chance to take the match in the next frame and went on to lose 9–10. Zhang ended the season ranked world number 71.

=== 2010/2011 season ===
Zhang began the 2010–11 season well by defeating Jak Jones 5–4, Paul Davies 5–1 and Stuart Pettman 5–3 to reach the final qualifying round of the Shanghai Masters. He faced Matthew Stevens and was beaten 2–5. However, he could only win more match in qualifying for the remaining six ranking events, concluding with a 6–10 loss to Andrew Pagett in the first round of World Championship qualifying. He finished the season ranked world number 84, well outside of the top 64 who retain their places on the snooker tour. He therefore entered Q School in an attempt to win back his place and was one match away from doing so in the first event, but lost 1–4 to David Grace. He couldn't qualify from the remaining two events and did not have a place on tour next season.

=== 2011/2012 season ===
After being relegated off the tour the previous year, Zhang was confined to entering minor-ranking Players Tour Championship during the 2011–12 season. He played in all 12 of them, but had to wait until the final event, the FFB Snooker Open, for his first win which was a 4–1 triumph over Jamie Burnett. Zhang was beaten by the same scoreline by Stephen Maguire in the next round to finish a lowly 115th on the Order of Merit. Zhang lost in the final of the ACBS Asian Snooker Championship 2–5 to Hossein Vafaei, but as Vafaei had already qualified for the main snooker tour, Zhang received a place for the 2012–13 and 2013–14 seasons.

=== 2012/2013 season ===
Zhang lost in the first round of qualifying for the opening three ranking events of the season. He played in all three of the new minor-ranking Asian Players Tour Championship events, reaching two quarter-finals where he lost to Michael White 3–4 and Li Hang 2–4 respectively. He finished 10th on the Asian Order of Merit, just outside the top eight who qualified for the Finals. His first win in a ranking event match this season was a 6–5 success against Li Yan in International Championship qualifying, but he lost 3–6 to Alfie Burden in the next round. The most matches he could win in qualifying was for the World Open by seeing off Michael Wild 5–3, Luca Brecel 5–4 and Rory McLeod 5–2. He was edged out in the final qualifying round 4–5 by Jamie Cope. Zhang's season came to an end when he lost 5–10 to Michael White in the third round of World Championship qualifying. He finished the year ranked world number 77.

=== 2013/2014 season ===
Zhang won three consecutive matches 5–4 to qualify for the second ranking event of the season, the Australian Goldfields Open. He beat world number 20 Andrew Higginson 5–1 in the first round to reach the last 16 of a ranking event for the first time in his career, where he was defeated 5–1 by world number two Mark Selby. Zhang also qualified for the Indian Open and beat Alan McManus 4–1 in the first round, before losing 4–3 to Michael White. His best result in the minor-ranking European Tour events came at the Gdynia Open in Poland where he was beaten in the quarter-finals 4–2 by Fergal O'Brien. Zhang was relegated from the main tour at the end of the season as he was placed 77th in the world rankings, outside of the top 64 who remain. In his final game of the first 2014 Q School event he made a match-winning break of 54 in the deciding frame against Jamie Clarke to edge it 4–3, having been 3–0 up. The result earned Zhang a fresh two-year main tour card for the 2014–15 and 2015–16 seasons.

=== 2014/2015 season ===
Zhang played a curtailed schedule of events in the first half of the 2014–15 season. He met Ali Carter, who was playing in his first ranking match since having treatment for lung cancer, in the first round of the UK Championship and came back from 5–3 down to beat him 6–5. Zhang lost 6–5 to Rory McLeod in the second round. He was whitewashed 4–0 by Gary Wilson in the first round of the Welsh Open and narrowly lost 5–4 to Peter Ebdon in the first round of the China Open. Zhang defeated Anthony Hamilton 10–3, Mark Joyce 10–9 and won the last three frames against Liang Wenbo to beat him 10–9 and qualify for the World Championship. The world number 98 was the lowest ranked player to have qualified and in his second appearance in the event he fell 8–1 down to Joe Perry in the opening session. Zhang won the first three frames of the next session which included a 132 break, but Perry went on to complete a 10–4 win.

=== 2015/2016 season ===
Zhang defeated Liang Wenbo 4–3 to advance to the quarter-finals of the Haining Open, but lost 4–3 to Ding Junhui. He won his first professional event the General Cup Qualifying Event. He beat Cao Yupeng 5–4 in the final. This was an invitation event with the winner taking the eighth and final place in the General Cup. He would go on to reach the semi-finals of the event, where he was beaten 6–3 by Marco Fu. Zhang overcame Robert Milkins and Dechawat Poomjaeng both 5–4 to qualify for the German Masters and he whitewashed Alfie Burden 5–0 in the opening round to reach the last 16 of a ranking event for the second time in his career. His run was ended with a 5–1 defeat to Judd Trump. Zhang qualified for the World Championship for the second year in a row with wins over Bratislav Krustev, Mark Davis and Zhou Yuelong. He lost 10–5 to Barry Hawkins in the opening round. Zhang was just outside the top 64 in the world rankings at 65, but earned a new two-year tour card by finishing joint fifth on the Asian Tour Order of Merit.

=== 2016/2017 season ===
Zhang comfortably beat Dominic Dale 5–1 to play in the World Open where he defeated Peter Ebdon 5–1 and Judd Trump 5–2 to reach the last 16 of a ranking event for the third time, but he was thrashed 5–0 by David Gilbert. He got to the same stage of the UK Championship by overcoming Tian Pengfei 6–2, Anthony McGill 6–3 and Mitchell Mann 6–3. Zhang was unable to make it to his first quarter-final as he lost 6–1 to Mark Selby. He qualified for the China Open, but was ousted 5–1 by Mark Williams in the opening round.

=== 2019/2020 season ===
Zhang remained outside the Top 64 for the entire season with a relatively poor run of form and was unable to replicate prior successes.

=== 2020/2021 season ===
Owing to his previous poor season, he fell outside of the Top 64 and lost his Tour card. He did not enter the Q School event as a result of the continuing impacts of the COVID-19 pandemic and was therefore relegated from the professional tour. However, Zhang performed well in the 2021 CBSA China Tour and was awarded a tour card for the 2021–22 and 2022–23 World Snooker Tour seasons as a result.

=== 2023/2024 season ===
Zhang reached the final of the 2023 English Open, however came runner up with a 7–9 defeat to Judd Trump. One month later he reached the final of the 2023 International Championship. After beating O'Sullivan in the semi-final, he won his first world ranking title by beating Tom Ford 10–6. Anda hit a 147 maximum break in the match. At the 2024 World Championship, Zhang was defeated in the first round by Jak Jones 4–10.

=== 2025/2026 season ===
In February 2026, Zhang reached the final of the World Grand Prix but suffered a 6–10 defeat to Zhao Xintong.

== Personal life ==
Zhang Anda was married in May 2019, but the couple postponed their honeymoon so that Zhang could play in the CBSA Chinese National Championship in Xi'an. Zhang won the tournament, beating Zhao Jianbo 5–3 in the final.

== Performance and rankings timeline ==
Tournaments	2007/ 08	2008/ 09	2009/ 10	2010/ 11	2011/ 12	2012/ 13	2013/ 14	2014/ 15	2015/ 16	2016/ 17	2017/ 18	2018/ 19	2019/ 20	2021/ 22	2022/ 23	2023/ 24	2024/ 25	2025/ 26	2026/ 27
Rankings (Note: It shows the ranking at the beginning of the season)	(Note: He was an amateur)		(Note: New players on the Main Tour don't have a ranking)	70			77	(Note: Players qualified through Q School started the season without prize money ranking points)	83	(Note: Players qualified through European Tour Order of Merit started the season without prize money ranking points)	67	(Note: Players qualified One Year Ranking List started the season without ranking points)	74		70	58	12	12	20
Ranking tournaments
Championship League	Non-Ranking Event													A	RR	RR	A	2R	3R
China Open	WR	A	LQ	LQ	A	LQ	LQ	1R	LQ	1R	LQ	LQ	Tournament Not Held						QF
Wuhan Open	Tournament Not Held															3R	QF	QF	LQ
British Open	Tournament Not Held													1R	1R	LQ	2R	2R	2R
English Open	Tournament Not Held									2R	1R	1R	2R	LQ	1R	F	2R	2R	2R
Shenzhen Open (Note: The event was called the Xi'an Grand Prix (2024/2025–2025/2026))	Tournament Not Held																1R	LQ	LQ
Northern Ireland Open	Tournament Not Held									3R	1R	2R	2R	LQ	LQ	2R	1R	1R	2R
International Championship	Tournament Not Held					LQ	1R	LQ	LQ	LQ	LQ	1R	1R	Not Held		W	2R	2R	2R
UK Championship	A	A	LQ	LQ	A	LQ	2R	2R	1R	4R	1R	1R	1R	1R	LQ	QF	QF	QF	
Shoot Out	Not Held			Non-Ranking Event						1R	1R	3R	4R	2R	1R	2R	3R	1R	
Scottish Open	Tournament Not Held					MR	Not Held			2R	3R	3R	1R	2R	2R	3R	2R	3R	
German Masters	Not Held			LQ	A	LQ	LQ	LQ	2R	LQ	LQ	LQ	LQ	1R	1R	1R	3R	2R	
Welsh Open	A	A	LQ	LQ	A	LQ	1R	1R	1R	1R	1R	3R	1R	QF	LQ	1R	2R	3R	
World Grand Prix	Tournament Not Held							NR	DNQ	DNQ	DNQ	DNQ	DNQ	DNQ	DNQ	QF	1R	F	
Players Championship (Note: The event was called the Players Tour Championship Grand Final (2010/2011–2015/2016))	Not Held			DNQ	DNQ	DNQ	DNQ	DNQ	DNQ	DNQ	DNQ	DNQ	DNQ	DNQ	DNQ	F	DNQ	1R	
World Open (Note: The event was called the Grand Prix (2007/2008–2009/2010))	A	A	LQ	A	A	LQ	LQ	Not Held		3R	1R	1R	2R	Not Held		1R	LQ	3R	
Tour Championship	Tournament Not Held											DNQ	DNQ	DNQ	DNQ	QF	DNQ	DNQ	
World Championship	A	A	1R	LQ	A	LQ	LQ	1R	1R	LQ	LQ	LQ	A	LQ	LQ	1R	1R	1R	
Non-ranking tournaments
Shanghai Masters	Ranking Event											A	A	Not Held		A	1R	2R	1R
Champion of Champions	A	A	A	A	A	A	A	A	A	A	A	A	A	A	A	1R	A	A	
Riyadh Season Championship (Note: The event was called the World Masters of Snooker (2023/2024))	Tournament Not Held															A	2R	A	
The Masters	A	A	LQ	A	A	A	A	A	A	A	A	A	A	A	A	1R	1R	A	
Championship League	A	A	A	A	A	A	A	A	A	A	A	A	A	A	A	A	A	2R	
Former ranking tournaments
Wuxi Classic (Note: The event was called the Jiangsu Classic (2008/2009–2009/2010))	NH	Non-Ranking Event				LQ	LQ	A	Tournament Not Held										
Australian Goldfields Open	Tournament Not Held				A	LQ	2R	A	LQ	Tournament Not Held									
Shanghai Masters	A	WR	LQ	LQ	A	LQ	LQ	WD	LQ	LQ	LQ	Non-Ranking		Not Held		Non-Ranking Event			
Paul Hunter Classic	Pro-am Event			Minor-Ranking Event						WD	A	QF	NR	Tournament Not Held					
Indian Open	Tournament Not Held						2R	LQ	NH	LQ	QF	LQ	Tournament Not Held						
Riga Masters (Note: The event was called the Riga Open (2014/2015–2015/2016))	Tournament Not Held							Minor-Rank		WD	3R	LQ	1R	Tournament Not Held					
China Championship	Tournament Not Held									NR	LQ	2R	LQ	Tournament Not Held					
Turkish Masters	Tournament Not Held													LQ	Tournament Not Held				
Gibraltar Open	Tournament Not Held								MR	1R	2R	1R	2R	3R	Tournament Not Held				
WST Classic	Tournament Not Held														2R	Tournament Not Held			
European Masters (Note: The event was called the Malta Cup (2007/2008))	NR	Tournament Not Held								LQ	LQ	3R	LQ	1R	1R	LQ	Not Held		
Saudi Arabia Masters	Tournament Not Held																6R	5R	NH
Former non-ranking tournaments
Beijing International Challenge	Not Held		A	LQ	Tournament Not Held														
General Cup	Not Held		A	NH	A	A	A	A	SF	Tournament Not Held									
Shoot Out	Not Held			A	A	A	2R	A	A	Ranking Event									
Macau Masters	Tournament Not Held											RR	Tournament Not Held						
Six-red World Championship (Note: The event was called the Six-red Snooker International (2008/2009) and the Six-red World Grand Prix (2009/2010))	NH	A	A	A	NH	RR	A	A	A	A	A	A	A	NH	QF	Tournament Not Held			
Haining Open	Tournament Not Held							Minor-Rank		SF	4R	4R	4R	A	NH	A	Tournament Not Held		

Performance Table Legend
LQ	lost in the qualifying draw	#R	lost in the early rounds of the tournament (WR = Wildcard round, RR = Round robin)	QF	lost in the quarter-finals
SF	lost in the semi-finals	F	lost in the final	W	won the tournament
DNQ	did not qualify for the tournament	A	did not participate in the tournament	WD	withdrew from the tournament

NH / Not Held	means an event was not held.
NR / Non-Ranking Event	means an event is/was no longer a ranking event.
R / Ranking Event	means an event is/was a ranking event.
MR / Minor-Ranking Event	means an event is/was a minor-ranking event.

== Career finals ==
=== Ranking finals: 4 (1 title) ===
Outcome	No.	Year	Championship	Opponent in the final	Score
Runner-up	1.	2023	English Open	(England) Judd Trump	7–9
Winner	1.	2023	International Championship	(England) Tom Ford	10–6
Runner-up	2.	2024	Players Championship	(Northern Ireland) Mark Allen	8–10
Runner-up	3.	2026	World Grand Prix	(China) Zhao Xintong	6–10

=== Non-ranking finals: 3 (1 title) ===
Outcome	No.	Year	Championship	Opponent in the final	Score
Runner-up	1.	2010	The China Classic	(China) Tian Pengfei	3–5
Winner	1.	2015	General Cup Qualifying Event	(China) Cao Yupeng	5–4
Runner-up	2.	2025	Helsinki International Cup	(Northern Ireland) Mark Allen	3–6

=== Team finals: 1 ===
Outcome	No.	Year	Championship	Team/partner	Opponent(s) in the final	Score
Runner-up	1.	2018	Macau Masters	(England) Joe Perry (Hong Kong) Marco Fu (Wales) Mark Williams	(England) Barry Hawkins (Wales) Ryan Day (China) Zhao Xintong (China) Zhou Yuelong	1–5

=== Pro-am finals: 2 (2 titles) ===
Outcome	No.	Year	Championship	Opponent in the final	Score
Winner	1.	2016	Fuzhou Open	(China) Zhou Yuelong	5–1
Winner	2.	2019	Xi'an Open	(China) Zhao Jianbo	5–3

=== Amateur finals: 3 (1 title) ===
Outcome	No.	Year	Championship	Opponent in the final	Score
Runner-up	1.	2007	IBSF World Under-21 Championship	(England) Michael Georgiou	6–11
Winner	1.	2009	ACBS Asian Under-21 Championship	(Thailand) Noppon Saengkham	5–1
Runner-up	2.	2012	ACBS Asian Under-21 Championship	(Iran) Hossein Vafaei	2–6
