= 2010 Masters (snooker) =

Professional non-ranking snooker tournament, Jan 2010

2010 PokerStars.com Masters

Tournament information
- Dates: 10–17 January 2010
- Venue: Wembley Arena
- City: London
- Country: England
- Organisation: WPBSA
- Format: Non-ranking event
- Total prize fund: £486,000
- Winner's share: £150,000
- Highest break: Stephen Maguire (SCO) (140); Neil Robertson (AUS) (140)

Final
- Champion: Mark Selby (ENG)
- Runner-up: Ronnie O'Sullivan (ENG)
- Score: 10–9

The 2010 Masters (officially the 2010 PokerStars.com Masters) was a professional non-ranking snooker tournament that took place between 10 and 17 January 2010 at the Wembley Arena in London, England. This was the first time that the Masters was sponsored by PokerStars.com.

The final was a repeat of the previous years' final, with Mark Selby playing against the defending championship Ronnie O'Sullivan. Unlike the previous year, Selby won his 2nd Masters title by defeating O'Sullivan 10–9 in the final after trailing 4–1, 5–3 and 9–6.

== Field ==
Defending champion Ronnie O'Sullivan was the number 1 seed with World Champion John Higgins seeded 2. Places were allocated to the top 16 players in the world rankings. Players seeded 15 and 16 played in the wild-card round against the winner of the qualifying event, Rory McLeod (ranked 39), and wild-card selection Jimmy White (ranked 56). Rory McLeod was making his debut in the Masters following his win in the qualifying tournament; this to date is the last Masters to feature such qualifying tournament and the wildcard round in general.

== Prize fund ==
The breakdown of prize money for this year is shown below:

=== Qualifying stage ===
- Winner: £2,000
- Runner-up: £680
- Semi-final: £250
- Quarter-final: £105

=== Televised stage ===
- Winner: £150,000
- Runner-up: £75,000
- Semi-final: £34,000
- Quarter-final: £16,000
- Last 16: £14,000
- Last 18 (wild-cards): £3,500
- Highest break: £10,000
- Maximum break: £25,000
- Total: £486,000

== Wild-card round ==
In the preliminary round the wild-card players played the 15th and 16th seeds:

Match	Date		Score	
WC1	Monday 11 January	Mark Williams (WAL) (15)	6–2	Rory McLeod (ENG)
WC2	Sunday 10 January	Mark King (ENG) (16)	6–2	Jimmy White (ENG)

== Main draw ==
Last 16; Best of 11 frames
1	Ronnie O'Sullivan (ENG)	6
9	Neil Robertson (AUS)	4
8	Marco Fu (HKG)	2
14	Peter Ebdon (ENG)	6
5	Ali Carter (ENG)	3
15	Mark Williams (WAL)	6
4	Shaun Murphy (ENG)	6
10	Stephen Hendry (SCO)	4
3	Stephen Maguire (SCO)	6
16	Mark King (ENG)	3
6	Ryan Day (WAL)	6
12	Joe Perry (ENG)	0
7	Mark Selby (ENG)	6
13	Ding Junhui (CHN)	1
2	John Higgins (SCO)	3
11	Mark Allen (NIR)	6

Quarter-finals; Best of 11 frames
1	(England) Ronnie O'Sullivan	6
14	(England) Peter Ebdon	3
15	(Wales) Mark Williams	6
4	(England) Shaun Murphy	4
3	(Scotland) Stephen Maguire	6
6	(Wales) Ryan Day	1
7	(England) Mark Selby	6
11	(Northern Ireland) Mark Allen	5

Semi-finals; Best of 11 frames
1	(England) Ronnie O'Sullivan	6
15	(Wales) Mark Williams	5
3	(Scotland) Stephen Maguire	3
7	(England) Mark Selby	6

Final; Best of 19 frames
1	(England) Ronnie O'Sullivan	9
7	(England) Mark Selby	10

== Final ==
Final: Best of 19 frames. Referee: Jan Verhaas; Wembley Arena, London, England, 17 January 2010
Ronnie O'Sullivan (1); England	9–10	Mark Selby (7); England
Afternoon: 35–81, 90–34 (56), 86–7 (86), 122–0 (122), 101–4 (101), 0–83 (83), 0–112 (112), 74–33 (54); Evening: 0–117 (54, 58), 114–8 (92), 0–129 (129), 74–41, 0–78 (78), 137–0 (89), 91–3 (91), 25–92 (62), 8–109 (109), 67–78, 0–65
122	Highest break	129
2	Century breaks	3
8	50+ breaks	8

== Qualifying ==
The 2009 Masters Qualifying Event was held between 26 and 29 October 2009 at Pontins in Prestatyn, Wales. Rory McLeod earned a wild-card to the 2010 Masters, beating Andrew Higginson 6–1 in the final.

Round 1 Best of 7 frames

Round 2 Best of 9 frames

Round 3 Best of 9 frames

Quarter-finals; Best of 9 frames

Semi-finals; Best of 9 frames

Final; Best of 11 frames

== Century breaks ==
=== Televised stage centuries ===
A total of 20 century breaks were made during the event.

- 140, 121 – Stephen Maguire
- 140, 101 – Neil Robertson
- 132, 107, 102 – Mark Williams
- 129, 112, 109 – Mark Selby
- 122, 114, 106, 106, 101 – Ronnie O'Sullivan
- 114, 104 – Stephen Hendry
- 114 – Mark Allen
- 106, 100 – Shaun Murphy

=== Qualifying stage centuries ===
A total of 12 centuries were made during qualifying for the event.

- 137 – Barry Pinches
- 125 – Judd Trump
- 120 – Bjorn Haneveer
- 118 – Matthew Selt
- 116 – Jimmy White
- 111, 109 – Anthony Hamilton
- 107, 100 – Jamie Burnett
- 106 – David Gray
- 105 – Rory McLeod
- 100 – Robert Milkins
