= Mark King (snooker player) =

English professional snooker player (born 1974)

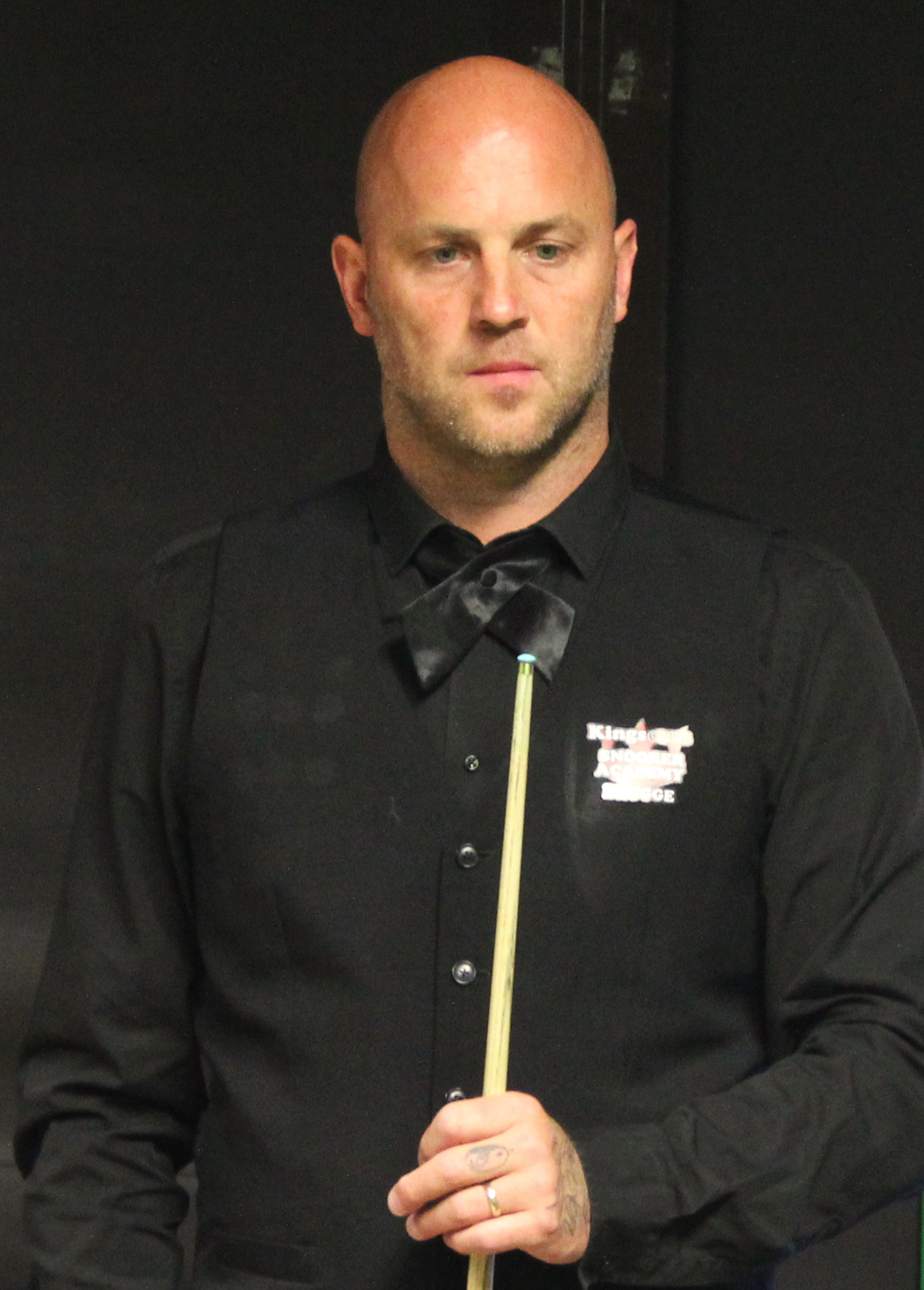
- King at the 2016 Paul Hunter Classic

Personal information
- Nickname: Kojak
- Born: 28 March 1974 (age 52) Romford, Greater London, England

Sport
- Country: England
- Sport: Snooker
- Professional: 1991–2024
- Highest ranking: 11 (2002/03)
- Century breaks: 156

Tournament wins
- Ranking: 1

Mark King (born 28 March 1974) is an English former professional snooker player.

Having turned professional in 1991, King was ranked within the world's top 32 players between 1996 and 2015, and won his first ranking event title in 2016, defeating Barry Hawkins 9–8 in the final of the Northern Ireland Open. He has also appeared in two other ranking tournament finals: the 1997 Welsh Open, where he lost 2–9 to Stephen Hendry; and the 2004 Irish Masters, where Peter Ebdon defeated him 10–7.

King has reached the last 16 of the World Championship seven times, in 1998, 1999, 2001, 2002, 2008, 2009 and 2013, but has never progressed beyond this stage.

In November 2024, it was announced that King had been banned from snooker for five years after being found guilty of match fixing and providing inside information relating to his match against Joe Perry at the Welsh Open on 13 February 2023. He had been provisionally suspended since 18 March 2023 when the investigation into irregular betting patterns on the match was launched.

== Career ==
King turned professional in 1991 and advanced steadily through the rankings, reaching the top 48 by 1996. His Welsh Open final run led to a top 32 place in the end of season rankings, and he continued to progress by reaching the top 16 a year later. He made his debut at the World Snooker Championship in 1994, losing to Darren Morgan in the first round.

He remained in the top 16 the following season without reaching a ranking quarter-final, but dropped out a year later. He made an immediate return in 2000–01, climbing to a career-high of #11. A poor 2002–03 season ended with him dropping out of the top 16 again after defeat to Drew Henry 10–5 in the first round of the World Championship. In the post-match interview, King suggested that he had lost patience with the game and would quit because "I've just had enough of the game."

After the 2004 World Championship, King became involved in a tense battle with Quinten Hann after his friend Andy Hicks eliminated Hann in a controversial first-round clash. Hann had been making provocative gestures during the match and after Hicks took victory, the two players had an altercation, with an angry Hann squaring up to Hicks. Upset by Hann's behaviour, King challenged the Australian to a boxing match, for which King was later criticised, as Hann's behaviour had already put the game into disrepute. Nevertheless, the bout went ahead and Hann controversially won the fight on a points decision.

In December 2004, King beat Robin Hull, Mark Williams, Alan McManus and John Parrott en route to the semi-finals of the UK Championship, losing 9–4 to eventual winner Stephen Maguire. At 8–3, a mobile phone went off in the crowd, prompting King to quip "if that's my missus, tell her I'll be home soon". In 2005, King beat Ronnie O'Sullivan 9–8 at the same event, having fought back from 5–3 down in a match which saw his opponent sitting with a wet towel draped over his head when King was at the table. King would eventually lose 9–6 in the last 16 to Joe Perry, but made a career best 146 break at the 2006 Championships.

Defeat to Neil Robertson (he was trailing 7–2 but only lost 10–9) in the qualifying for the World Championship in 2005 cost him the chance of a top 16 return, but King qualified a year later, resiliently losing 10–6 to Stephen Maguire in the first round. In 2007, King went out to David Gilbert in the qualifying round for the event.

In the 2008 World Championship, King beat six-times runner-up Jimmy White to qualify, then shocked the previous year's runner-up Mark Selby 10–8, having trailed 5–3 overnight. After potting the match ball, King showed his delight by shouting "Get in". He lost to Peter Ebdon in the last 16, but his top-16 place was secure and he would start the 08/09 campaign ranked 15th.

A consistent 2008–09 season saw King retain his top 16 spot.

At the 2009 Grand Prix King needed three snookers in the deciding frame against Ricky Walden to claim a 5–4 victory. He managed to get them and won by potting the final black. In the next round he lost to Robert Milkins.

At the 2010 China Open King defeated Thai player James Wattana 5–4 in the first round after trailing 2–4. He then won his second match 5–3 against Chinese player Tian Pengfei to reach his first Quarter final since the 2007 Malta Cup. A double triumph for King, the win helped to maintain his Top 16 place for the 2010/11 season.

At the 2010 World championship, King lost his first round match against former 6 times World Champion Steve Davis by 9–10. In the deciding frame, Davis led 55–37, with only 13 points available. King's attempts at getting the snooker he needed to win ended with him fluking the pink in the pocket.

King made an impressive start to the new season when he reached the Quarter Final of the 2010 Shanghai Masters. King was too strong for qualifier Joe Delaney in the first round, winning 5–3. The same scoreline saw him overcome Peter Ebdon in the next round but King was then beaten comfortably by Mark Selby 5–1. However his lack of form in the following ranking events made him fall out of the top 16 after the 2011 Welsh Open.

At the 2011 Masters, King beat defending champion Mark Selby 6–4 to reach his first quarter-final at the event since 1999. After the match, King suggested that his comeback from 0–2 down was prompted by his opponent's celebration to winning the second frame on the black, when he "put his cue up and it gave me the hump a bit" King then lost in the quarter-finals 1–6 against Jamie Cope. He ended the season by losing 7–10 to Graeme Dott in the World Championship and was ranked 26, dropping 11 places during the year. He was therefore out of the top 16 in the end of season rankings for the first time since the 2007–08 season.

=== 2011/2012 season ===
King's ranking meant that he would need to win a match to qualify for the ranking tournaments in the 2011–12 season. He failed to qualify for four of the eight ranking tournaments during the season and was knocked out in the first round in two. However, he produced an excellent run in the Shanghai Masters where he reached his first semi-final since the 2005 Welsh Open. He required a final frame decider to beat Liu Song in qualifying 5–4 and once in China he won by the same scoreline to knock out defending champion Ali Carter in the first round. Further wins followed over Fergal O'Brien and Anthony Hamilton, before he was whitewashed 0–6 by Mark Selby in the last four. King also reached the quarter-finals of the World Open by beating Mark Williams 5–1 and Tom Ford 5–4, but then lost 1–5 to Mark Allen. King lost to seventeen-year-old Luca Brecel in qualifying for the World Championship and finished the season ranked world number 31, dropping five places during the year.

=== 2012/2013 season ===
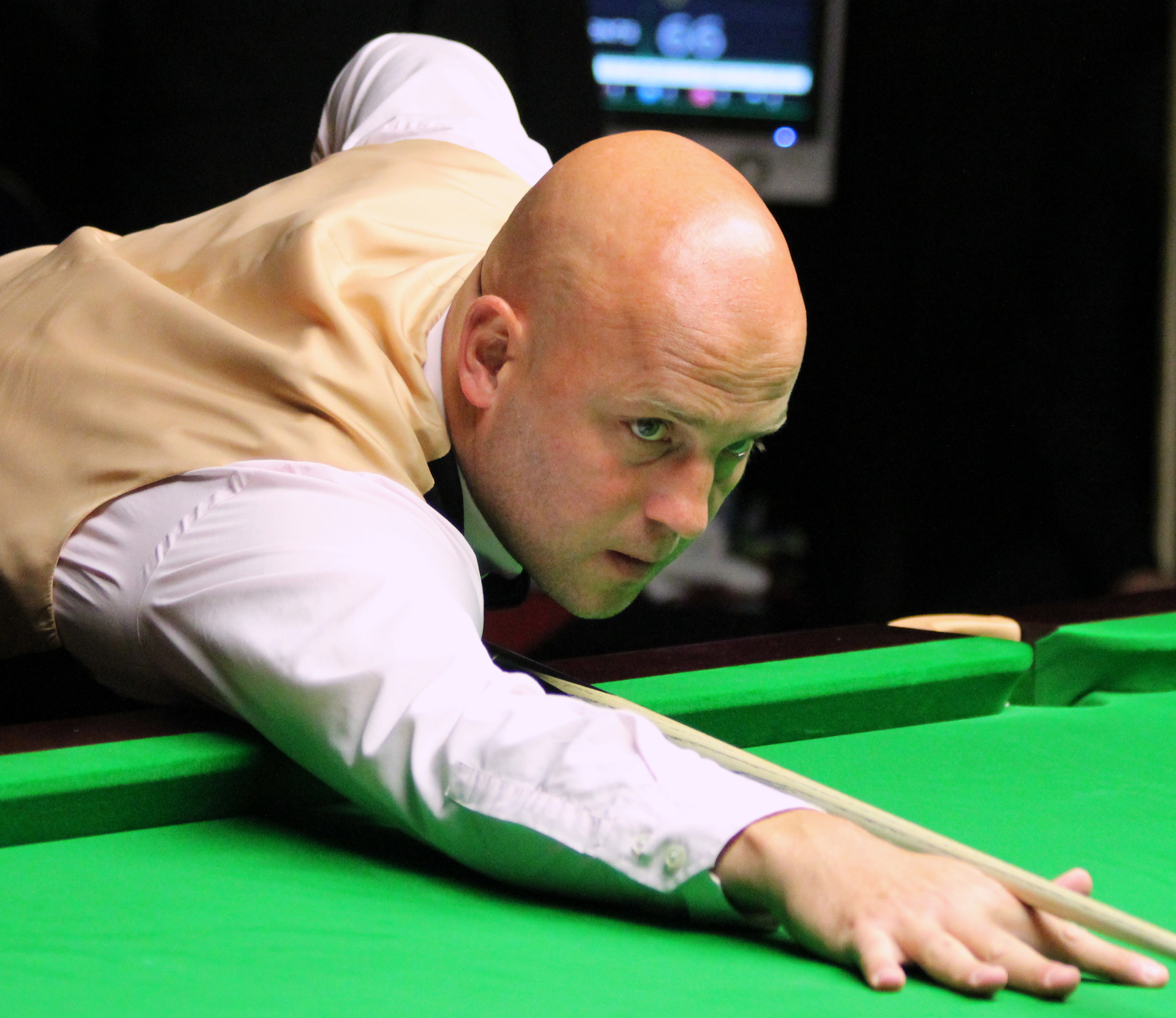
King at 2012 Paul Hunter Classic

King began the 2012–13 season by failing to qualify for three of the first four ranking events. The one he did reach was the Shanghai Masters, where he beat Zhao Xintong 5–3 in the wildcard round and local favourite Ding Junhui 5–4 in the first round, having trailed 0–3. He lost 3–5 to Shaun Murphy in the following round. King defeated Mark Williams 6–3 in the first round of the 2012 UK Championship, before surrendering a 3–0 lead against 17-year-old Luca Brecel to lose 4–6. He also reached the second round of the German Masters by whitewashing Stephen Maguire 5–0, but then lost in a deciding frame to Matthew Stevens.

King failed to qualify for the World Open and lost in the first round of the Welsh Open and China Open. He faced Mark Allen in the opening round of the World Snooker Championship and produced a shock by fighting back from 6–8 down to produce his best snooker at the end of the match in a 10–8 win. He raced into a 6–2 lead in the first session of his second round match against Ding Junhui, before falling 7–9 behind in the next session and ultimately lost 9–13. King ended the season ranked world number 29.

=== 2013/2014 season ===
King had his best results in the Chinese ranking events during the 2013–14 season, beginning with the Wuxi Classic where he beat Rory McLeod 5–3 and Marco Fu 5–4, before being thrashed 5–0 by Neil Robertson in the last 16. At the Shanghai Masters he knocked out Graeme Dott, but Robertson was again victorious when the pair met in the last 16 this time winning 5–3. During King's tie with Fergal O'Brien in the last 64 of the 2013 UK Championship, he made 15 consecutive foul and misses in the sixth frame and went on to lose 6–3. The match was played in a sports hall as the Barbican Centre itself was too small to accommodate enough tables, with King saying afterwards that the conditions were not good enough and as long as the top players were okay the governing body did not care. At the China Open, King saw off Aditya Mehta 5–4, Fu 5–3 and Jamie O'Neill 5–3 to reach his only quarter-final of the season. He faced Ding Junhui who had already won four ranking events during the season and lost 5–2. King failed to reach The Crucible this year as Jamie Cope beat him 10–7 in the final round of World Championship qualifiers.

=== 2014/2015 season ===
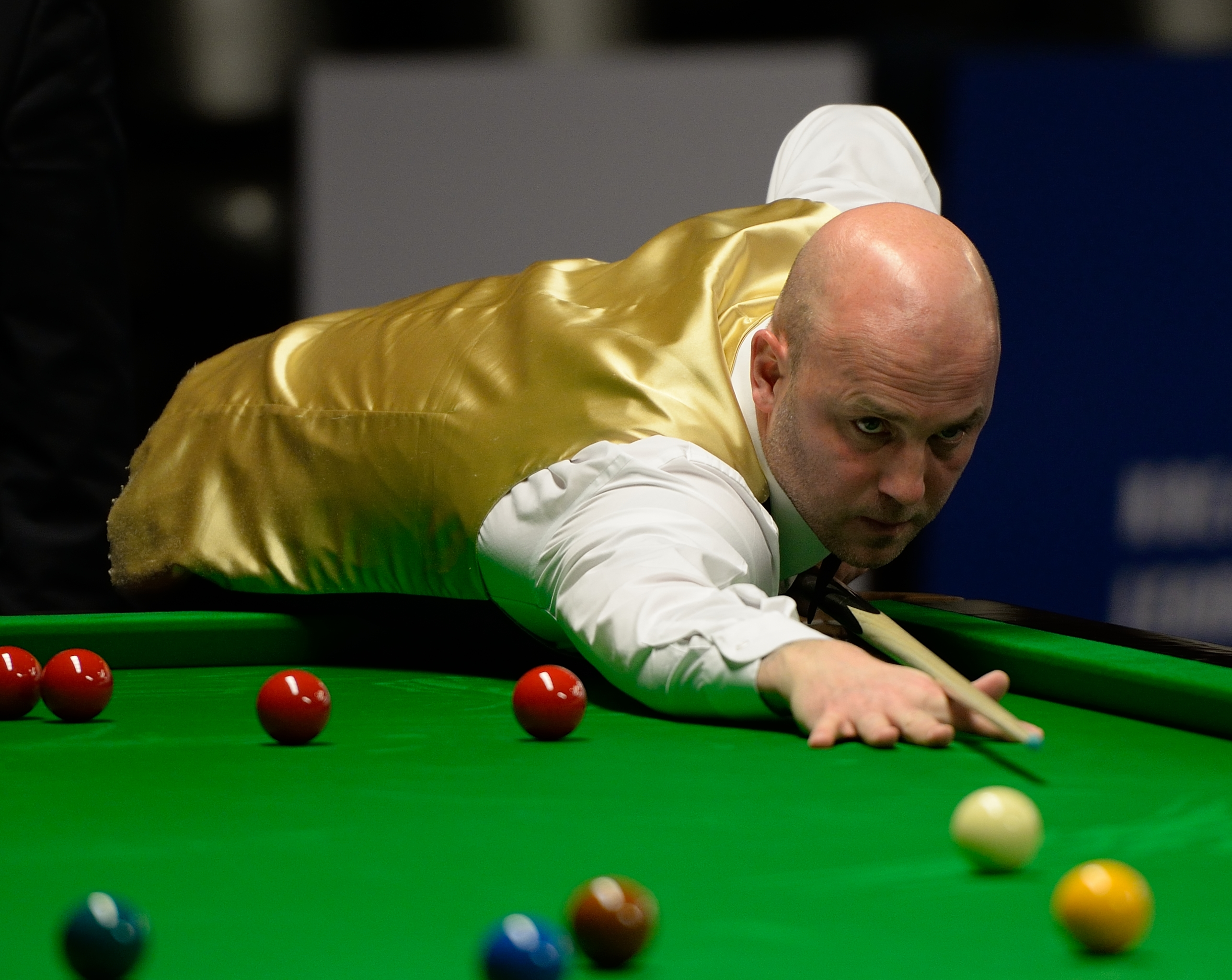
Mark King at the 2015 German Masters

King lost in the qualifying rounds of three of the first five ranking events of the 2014–15 season and was knocked out in the first round of the other two. He defeated Steven Hallworth and Michael White both 5–3 to qualify for the German Masters and eliminated world number five Barry Hawkins 5–3 in the first round. In the last 16 he lost 5–2 to Stephen Maguire. A consistent season in the European Tour events saw King finish 24th on the Order of Merit to make his debut in the Grand Final. King secured another win over Hawkins this time 4–2 and looked like moving 3–2 ahead of Judd Trump in the last 16. However, Trump got the snooker he needed and won the next frame to defeat King. King closed the season with a 5–4 loss to Robin Hull in the second round of the China Open and was narrowly edged out 10–9 by Anthony McGill in the final round of World Championship qualifying. He fell outside the top 32 in the rankings for the first time since 1996 at the culmination of the season as he was 36th.

=== 2015/2016 season ===
King was knocked out in the first round of the 2015 Australian Goldfields Open 5–1 by Mark Selby. At the Paul Hunter Classic, King advanced to the semi-finals with the loss of just one frame. He moved 3–0 up on Shaun Murphy with two 123 breaks but then missed multiple chances to win the match, as well as Murphy getting some flukes, to be beaten 4–3. He was also a losing quarter-finalist at the Gibraltar Open and Gdynia Open to finish ninth on the Order of Merit. In the Grand Final he lost 4–2 to Mark Allen in the second round. King overcame Ali Carter 5–2 at the China Open and beat Murphy 5–3 and Martin O'Donnell 5–0 to reach his first ranking event quarter-final in two years. He could not win a frame after being 3–2 up on Judd Trump to lose 5–3.

=== 2016/2017 season – first ranking title ===
King failed to get past the second round in the first eight events of the 2016–17 season. At the inaugural Northern Ireland Open, King beat Igor Figueiredo, Liang Wenbo, Fergal O'Brien, Kurt Maflin, Hossein Vafaei Ayouri and Kyren Wilson to reach his first ranking event final since 2004. He was 5–1 down to Barry Hawkins, before winning six successive frames. King went on to be 8–7 up, with the 16th frame going to a re-spotted black after King had needed a snooker and he missed a double on it to win. King took the deciding frame to win a ranking event for the first time in his 25-year career. He paid tribute to his father who had lent King money for the trip to Belfast.

King defeated Stephen Maguire and Ali Carter both 4–3 to progress to the quarter-finals of the World Grand Prix, where he lost 4–2 to Marco Fu. For the fourth year in a row King could not play in the World Championship as he was beaten 10–4 by Xiao Guodong in the final qualifying round.

== Betting ban ==
On 15 November 2024, it was announced that King had been banned from snooker for five years and ordered to pay £68,299.50 in costs after an Independent Disciplinary Committee found him guilty of one count of match fixing and one count of providing inside information relating to a match he played against Joe Perry at the Welsh Open on 13 February 2023. He had been provisionally suspended since 18 March 2023 when the investigation into irregular betting patterns on the match began and his ban was backdated meaning he is eligible to return to professional snooker on 18 March 2028. King unsuccessfully appealed against the decision and his punishment in April 2025.

== Performance and rankings timeline ==
Tournament	1991/ 92	1992/ 93	1993/ 94	1994/ 95	1995/ 96	1996/ 97	1997/ 98	1998/ 99	1999/ 00	2000/ 01	2001/ 02	2002/ 03	2003/ 04	2004/ 05	2005/ 06	2006/ 07	2007/ 08	2008/ 09	2009/ 10	2010/ 11	2011/ 12	2012/ 13	2013/ 14	2014/ 15	2015/ 16	2016/ 17	2017/ 18	2018/ 19	2019/ 20		2020/ 21	2021/ 22	2022/ 23	2023/ 24
Ranking (Note: From the 2010/2011 season it shows the ranking at the beginning of the season)	(Note: New players on the Main Tour don't have a ranking)	209	169	89	52	39	20	16	14	22	13	11	22	23	20	29	21	15	16	15	26	31	29	28	36	36	20	21	28		36	52	51	62
Ranking tournaments
Championship League	Tournament Not Held																Non-Ranking Event														2R	RR	RR	A
European Masters (Note: The event was called the European Open (1991/1992–1996/1997 and 2001/2002–2003/2004), Irish Open (1998/1999) and the Malta Cup (2004/2005–2007/2008))	LQ	1R	LQ	1R	LQ	LQ	NH	1R	Not Held		1R	QF	LQ	LQ	2R	QF	NR	Tournament Not Held								LQ	1R	SF	LQ		1R	LQ	LQ	A
British Open	LQ	LQ	LQ	LQ	LQ	2R	3R	3R	3R	QF	SF	2R	2R	2R	Tournament Not Held																	2R	LQ	A
English Open	Tournament Not Held																									2R	1R	3R	1R		1R	SF	1R	A
Wuhan Open	Tournament Not Held																																	A
Northern Ireland Open	Tournament Not Held																									W	3R	2R	1R		1R	2R	1R	A
International Championship	Tournament Not Held																					LQ	1R	LQ	LQ	1R	2R	2R	1R		Not Held			A
UK Championship	LQ	LQ	LQ	3R	1R	1R	QF	1R	2R	2R	2R	2R	3R	SF	3R	2R	2R	2R	2R	1R	LQ	2R	2R	1R	1R	1R	QF	3R	3R		2R	3R	LQ	A
Shoot Out	Tournament Not Held																			Non-Ranking Event						3R	2R	1R	A		1R	2R	1R	A
Scottish Open (Note: The event was called the International Open (1992/1993–1996/1997) and the Players Championship (2003/2004))	NH	LQ	1R	LQ	2R	LQ	1R	1R	3R	3R	3R	3R	3R	Tournament Not Held								MR	Not Held			2R	1R	2R	2R		2R	1R	1R	A
World Grand Prix	Tournament Not Held																							NR	DNQ	QF	1R	1R	DNQ		DNQ	1R	DNQ	DNQ
German Masters (Note: The event was called the German Open (1995/1996–1997/1998))	Tournament Not Held				2R	LQ	LQ	NR	Tournament Not Held											1R	LQ	2R	2R	2R	2R	2R	LQ	LQ	LQ		WD	LQ	LQ	A
Welsh Open	LQ	LQ	LQ	LQ	LQ	F	SF	1R	1R	2R	2R	1R	2R	SF	1R	1R	2R	2R	2R	2R	1R	1R	3R	2R	2R	2R	1R	1R	1R		4R	LQ	LQ	A
Players Championship (Note: The event was called the Players Tour Championship Grand Final (2010/2011–2015/2016))	Tournament Not Held																			DNQ	DNQ	DNQ	DNQ	2R	2R	1R	DNQ	DNQ	DNQ		DNQ	DNQ	DNQ	DNQ
World Open (Note: The event was called the Grand Prix (1991/1992–2000/2001 and 2004/2005–2009/2010) and the LG Cup (2001/2002–2003/2004))	LQ	LQ	LQ	2R	1R	3R	3R	2R	2R	3R	3R	2R	1R	1R	2R	SF	RR	1R	2R	LQ	QF	LQ	2R	Not Held		1R	1R	LQ	LQ		Not Held			A
Tour Championship	Tournament Not Held																											DNQ	DNQ		DNQ	DNQ	DNQ	DNQ
World Championship	LQ	LQ	1R	LQ	LQ	LQ	2R	2R	1R	2R	2R	1R	1R	LQ	1R	LQ	2R	2R	1R	1R	LQ	2R	LQ	LQ	LQ	LQ	LQ	LQ	1R		LQ	LQ	A	A
Non-ranking tournaments
Champion of Champions	Tournament Not Held																						A	A	A	A	1R	A	A		A	A	A	A
The Masters	A	A	LQ	LQ	LQ	LQ	LQ	QF	1R	LQ	1R	1R	LQ	A	A	LQ	LQ	WR	1R	QF	A	A	A	A	A	A	A	A	A		A	A	A	A
Championship League	Tournament Not Held																2R	2R	A	RR	RR	A	RR	RR	A	A	RR	RR	RR	RR	A	A	A	A
World Seniors Championship	A	Tournament Not Held																		A	A	A	A	LQ	LQ	A	A	NH	A		A	A	A	A
Former ranking tournaments
Classic	LQ	Tournament Not Held																																
Strachan Open (Note: The event was called the Strachan Challenge (1992/1993–1993/1994))	LQ	MR	NR	Tournament Not Held																														
Asian Classic (Note: The event was called the Dubai Classic (1991/1992-1994/1995) and the Thailand Classic (1995/1996))	LQ	LQ	LQ	LQ	LQ	LQ	Tournament Not Held																											
Malta Grand Prix	Not Held			Non-Ranking Event					1R	NR	Tournament Not Held																							
Thailand Masters (Note: The event was called the Asian Open (1991/1992–1992/1993) and the Thailand Open (1993/1994–1996/1997))	LQ	LQ	LQ	LQ	LQ	1R	1R	2R	QF	LQ	2R	NR	Not Held			NR	Tournament Not Held																	
Irish Masters	Non-Ranking Event											1R	F	LQ	NH	NR	Tournament Not Held																	
Northern Ireland Trophy	Tournament Not Held														NR	2R	2R	2R	Tournament Not Held															
Bahrain Championship	Tournament Not Held																	1R	Tournament Not Held															
Wuxi Classic (Note: The event was called the Jiangsu Classic (2008/2009–2009/2010))	Tournament Not Held																	Non-Ranking Event				LQ	3R	1R	Tournament Not Held									
Australian Goldfields Open (Note: The event was called the Australian Open (1994/1995-1995/1996) and Australian Masters (1995/1996))	Not Held			Non-Ranking		Tournament Not Held															LQ	LQ	LQ	LQ	1R	Tournament Not Held								
Shanghai Masters	Tournament Not Held																LQ	2R	1R	QF	SF	2R	2R	LQ	LQ	LQ	1R	Non-Ranking			Not Held			NR
Paul Hunter Classic (Note: The event was called the Grand Prix Fürth (2004/2005) and the Fürth German Open (2005/2006–2006/2007))	Tournament Not Held													Pro-am Event						Minor-Ranking Event						2R	4R	3R	NR		Tournament Not Held			
Indian Open	Tournament Not Held																						LQ	1R	NH	1R	SF	LQ	Tournament Not Held					
China Open (Note: The event was called the China International (1997/1998–1998/1999))	Tournament Not Held						NR	2R	1R	1R	1R	Not Held		LQ	LQ	1R	2R	2R	QF	LQ	1R	1R	QF	2R	QF	1R	2R	2R	Tournament Not Held					
Riga Masters (Note: The event was called the Riga Open (2014/2015–2015/2016))	Tournament Not Held																							Minor-Rank		1R	WD	3R	QF		Tournament Not Held			
China Championship	Tournament Not Held																									NR	1R	3R	1R		Tournament Not Held			
WST Pro Series	Tournament Not Held																														RR	Not Held		
Turkish Masters	Tournament Not Held																															LQ	Not Held	
Gibraltar Open	Tournament Not Held																								MR	2R	2R	2R	2R		1R	1R	Not Held	
WST Classic	Tournament Not Held																																WD	NH
Former non-ranking tournaments
Scottish Masters	A	A	A	A	A	A	A	A	A	A	LQ	1R	Tournament Not Held																					
Shoot Out	Tournament Not Held																			QF	1R	1R	3R	1R	1R	Ranking Event								
Romanian Masters	Tournament Not Held																										1R	Tournament Not Held						
Paul Hunter Classic	Tournament Not Held													Pro-am Event						Minor-Ranking Event						Ranking Event			QF		Tournament Not Held			
Haining Open	Tournament Not Held																							MR		QF	A	SF	4R		NH	A	Not Held	
Six-red World Championship (Note: The event was called the Six-red Snooker International (2008/2009) and Six-red World Grand Prix (2009/2010))	Tournament Not Held																	A	QF	A	NH	A	A	A	A	A	2R	RR	A		Not Held		LQ	NH

Performance Table Legend
LQ	lost in the qualifying draw	#R	lost in the early rounds of the tournament (WR = Wildcard round, RR = Round robin)	QF	lost in the quarter-finals
SF	lost in the semi-finals	F	lost in the final	W	won the tournament
DNQ	did not qualify for the tournament	A	did not participate in the tournament	WD	withdrew from the tournament
DQ	disqualified from the tournament				

NH / Not Held	event was not held.
NR / Non-Ranking Event	event is/was no longer a ranking event.
R / Ranking Event	event is/was a ranking event.
MR / Minor-Ranking Event	event is/was a minor-ranking event.

== Career finals ==
=== Ranking finals: 3 (1 title) ===
Outcome	No.	Year	Championship	Opponent in the final	Score
Runner-up	1.	1997	Welsh Open	(Scotland) Stephen Hendry	2–9
Runner-up	2.	2004	Irish Masters	(England) Peter Ebdon	7–10
Winner	1.	2016	Northern Ireland Open	(England) Barry Hawkins	9–8

=== Pro-am finals: 9 (5 titles) ===
Outcome	No.	Year	Championship	Opponent in the final	Score
Winner	1.	2003	Pontins Spring Open	(England) Craig Butler	5–4
Winner	2.	2005	Fürth German Open	(England) Michael Holt	4–2
Winner	3.	2005	Austrian Open	(England) Lee Richardson	5–2
Runner-up	1.	2006	Dutch Open	(England) Michael Wild	5–6
Runner-up	2.	2007	Ravenace Metals Ltd Invitation Pro-Am	(England) Ricky Walden	1–5
Winner	4.	2013	Vienna Snooker Open	(England) Craig Steadman	5–0
Winner	5.	2014	Vienna Snooker Open (2)	(England) Nigel Bond	5–2
Runner-up	3.	2015	Vienna Snooker Open	(England) Peter Ebdon	3–5
Runner-up	4.	2019	Vienna Snooker Open (2)	(England) Mark Joyce	4–5
