= Jan Verhaas =

Dutch snooker and pool referee (born 1966)

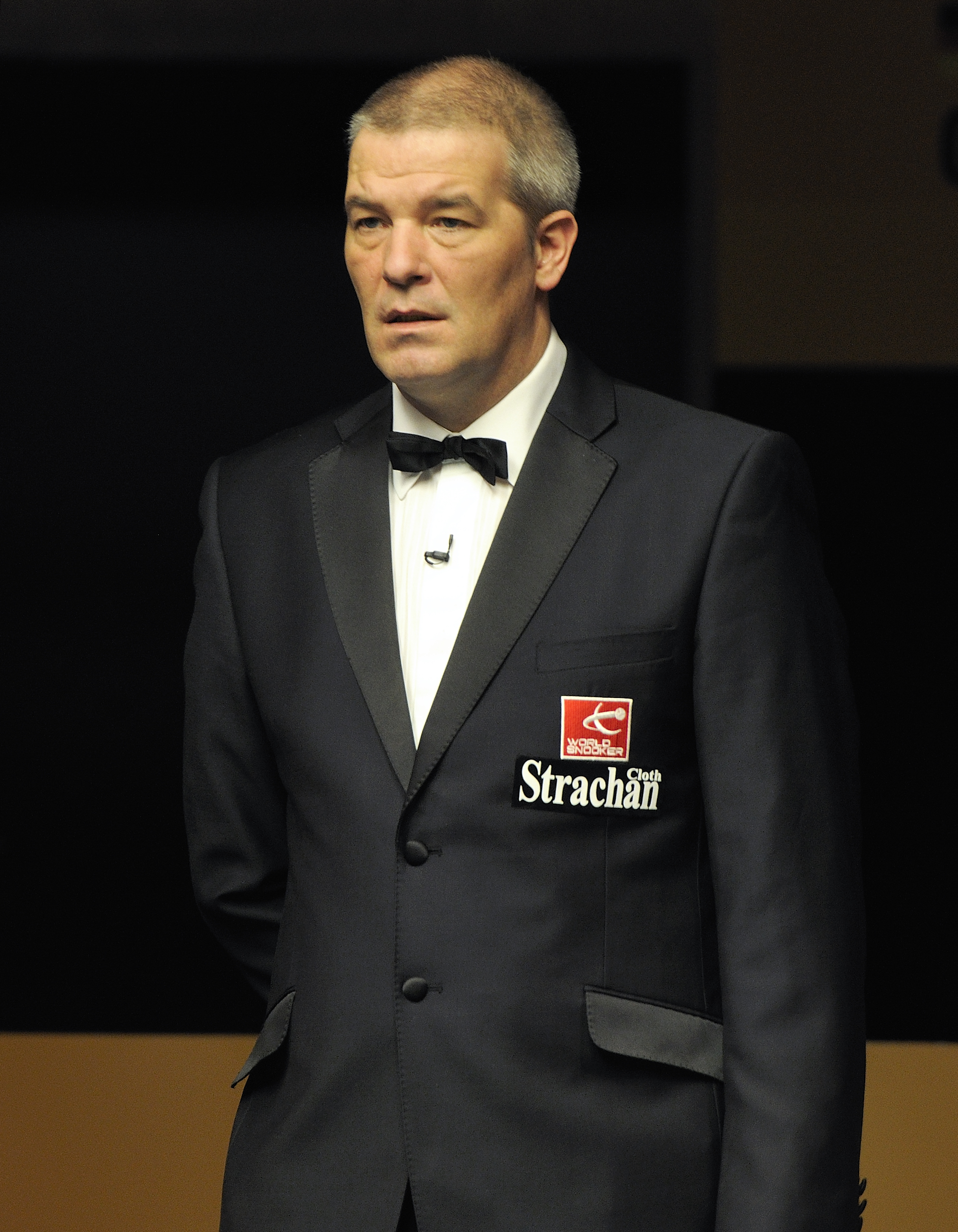
- Jan Verhaas at the German Masters in 2013

Personal information
- Born: 5 October 1966 (age 60) Maassluis, South Holland, Netherlands

Sport
- Country: Netherlands
- Sport: Snooker
- Professional: 1990–present

Jan Verhaas (Dutch pronunciation: [ˈjɑɱ vɛrˈɦaːs]; born 5 October 1966) is a Dutch snooker and pool referee, best known for refereeing on the World Snooker Tour (WST) from 1991 to 2025. At the 2003 World Snooker Championship, he became the first referee from outside the UK to referee a World Championship final. He also refereed the World Championship finals in 2006, 2008, 2011, 2013 and 2017, as well as eight Masters finals and four UK Championship finals.

After stepping away from active snooker refereeing in 2025, he transitioned to the role of WST Referee Development Manager, assessing and developing younger referees. He continues to serve as tournament director and assistant tournament director at WST events. He was born in Maassluis, South Holland, and now lives in Brielle. He is 198 cm (6 ft 6 in) tall.

== Career ==
After working as a process operator for Shell Chemicals, Verhaas qualified as a class 1 snooker referee in 1990. In 1989 he had been helping at tournaments at a friend's snooker club in Rotterdam, when referee Michael Clarke advised him about refereeing and encouraged him to qualify.

His first professional match as a snooker referee was in 1993 (between Tony Drago and Steve Davis). In 2003 he became the first referee from outside the United Kingdom to take charge of a World Snooker Championship final. He also refereed the World Championship finals of 2006, 2008, 2011, 2013 and 2017, as well as eight Masters finals and four UK Championship finals. Verhaas refereed all three Masters finals which the late Paul Hunter won, and he describes them as his most memorable matches.

During his time as a snooker referee, Verhaas was occasionally involved in controversy. On 21 January 2007, he was the referee of the final of the Masters between Ronnie O'Sullivan and Ding Junhui, in which he ejected at least one fan from Wembley Arena for heckling the 19-year-old Chinese player. On 19 January 2012, at the Masters, Verhaas mistakenly stopped Graeme Dott in the middle of a break to adjust the score, before realising he had made an error and the score was in fact correct. Verhaas apologised to Dott, but the player missed his next shot and went on to lose the frame and match.

Verhaas refereed eight maximum breaks. He played a notable role in Ronnie O'Sullivan's 10th maximum break on 20 September 2010 at the World Open. After finding out that there was no special prize for completing a 147, O'Sullivan shook hands with opponent Mark King after potting the last pink. Verhaas, however, persuaded O'Sullivan to pot the last black and finish his break.

For several years he also refereed nine-ball pool tournaments organised by Matchroom Sport. This included several appearances at the Mosconi Cup and the initial Matchroom-organised 1999 World Professional Pool Championship, which was won by Efren Reyes.

He was elected as a board member of the World Professional Billiards and Snooker Association in 2016 but lost his bid for re-election three years later.

After stepping away from active refereeing in 2025, Verhaas transitioned to the role of WST Referee Development Manager, assessing and developing younger referees. He continues to serve as tournament director and assistant tournament director at WST events. As of 2025, he is the chairman of the WPBSA Rules Committee.

== Major finals ==
- World Championship – 2003, 2006, 2008, 2011, 2013, 2017
- UK Championship – 2005, 2006, 2008, 2015
- Masters – 1999, 2001, 2002, 2004, 2007, 2009, 2010, 2019
