= Stephen Rowlings =

English snooker player

Sport
- Country: England
- Sport: Snooker
- Professional: 2009/2010
- Highest ranking: 80 (May 2010)

Stephen Rowlings is an English former professional snooker player. His only season on the professional tour was the 2009–10 season.
