= 2017 Champion of Champions =

2017 188BET Champion of Champions
Tournament information
- Dates: 6–12 November 2017
- Venue: Ricoh Arena
- City: Coventry
- Country: England
- Organisation: Matchroom Sport
- Format: Non-ranking event
- Total prize fund: £370,000
- Winner's share: £100,000
- Highest break: Ronnie O'Sullivan (ENG) (138)

Final
- Champion: Shaun Murphy (ENG)
- Runner-up: Ronnie O'Sullivan (ENG)
- Score: 10–8

The 2017 Champion of Champions (officially the 2017 188BET Champion of Champions) was a professional non-ranking snooker tournament that took place between 6 and 12 November 2017 at the Ricoh Arena in Coventry, England.

John Higgins was the defending champion, but was whitewashed 0–6 by Ronnie O'Sullivan in the second round.

Ronnie O'Sullivan made his 900th century in the semi-final against Anthony Hamilton.

Shaun Murphy won the tournament, defeating Ronnie O'Sullivan 10–8 in the final.

== Prize fund ==
The breakdown of prize money for 2017 is shown below:

- Winner: £100,000
- Runner-up: £50,000
- Losing semi-finalist: £25,000
- Group runner-up: £17,500
- First round losers: £12,500
- Total: £370,000

== Players ==
Qualification for the 2017 188BET Champion of Champions tournament is determined by the winners of 24 tournaments over a one-year period, from the 2016 Champion of Champions to the 2017 International Championship, thereby including tournaments from both the 2016/2017 and 2017/2018 snooker seasons. The tournaments have been split into groups to determine the order of qualification, with the winners of the first sixteen listed tournaments guaranteed a place.

The following players qualified for the tournament:

Seed	Player	Qualified as	Date of tournament final	Date qualification confirmed
1	(Scotland) John Higgins	Winner of 2016 Champion of Champions; Winner of 2017 Championship League; Winner of 2017 Indian Open; Runner-up of 2017 World Snooker Championship	12 November 2016; 2 March 2017; 16 September 2017; 1 May 2017	12 November 2016
2	(England) Mark Selby	Winner of 2016 UK Championship; Winner of 2017 China Open; Winner of 2017 World Snooker Championship; Winner of 2017 International Championship	4 December 2016; 2 April 2017; 1 May 2017; 5 November 2017	4 December 2016
	(England) Ronnie O'Sullivan	Winner of 2017 Masters; Winner of 2017 English Open	22 January 2017; 22 October 2017	22 January 2017
	(England) Anthony Hamilton	Winner of 2017 German Masters	5 February 2017	5 February 2017
	(England) Barry Hawkins	Winner of 2017 World Grand Prix	12 February 2017	12 February 2017
	(England) Judd Trump	Winner of 2017 Players Championship; Winner of 2017 European Masters	12 March 2017; 8 October 2017	12 March 2017
	(Belgium) Luca Brecel	Winner of 2017 China Championship	22 August 2017	22 August 2017
	(China) Ding Junhui	Winner of 2017 World Cup; Winner of 2017 World Open	9 July 2017; 24 September 2017	24 September 2017
	(England) Mark King	Winner of 2016 Northern Ireland Open	20 November 2016	20 November 2016
	(Hong Kong) Marco Fu	Winner of 2016 Scottish Open	18 December 2016	18 December 2016
	(England) Shaun Murphy	Winner of 2017 Gibraltar Open	5 March 2017	29 April 2017
	(Wales) Ryan Day	Winner of 2017 Riga Masters	25 June 2017	16 September 2017
	(Wales) Michael White	Winner of 2017 Paul Hunter Classic	27 August 2017	7 October 2017
	(China) Liang Wenbo	Winner of 2017 World Cup	9 July 2017	22 October 2017
	(Scotland) Anthony McGill	Winner of 2017 Snooker Shoot Out	26 February 2017	24 October 2017
	(Australia) Neil Robertson	Winner of 2017 Hong Kong Masters	22 July 2017	5 November 2017

Notes

- On 24 October 2017, Stuart Bingham, who had qualified as a winner of the 2017 Welsh Open, was banned for six months for betting breaches.
- Mark Williams, the winner of the 2017 Six-red World Championship, was the tournament reserve player.

== Main draw ==
Group semi-finals (last 16); Best of 7 frames
(Scotland) John Higgins (1)	4
(Scotland) Anthony McGill	0
Group 4 (9 November)
(England) Ronnie O'Sullivan	4
(Australia) Neil Robertson	1
(China) Ding Junhui	2
(England) Anthony Hamilton	4
Group 1 (6 November)
(England) Barry Hawkins	2
(Wales) Ryan Day	4
(Hong Kong) Marco Fu	3
(Wales) Michael White	4
Group 2 (7 November)
(England) Shaun Murphy	4
(England) Mark King	2
(England) Judd Trump	0
(Belgium) Luca Brecel	4
Group 3 (8 November)
(England) Mark Selby (2)	4
(China) Liang Wenbo	3

Group finals (quarter-finals); Best of 11 frames
(Scotland) John Higgins (1)	0
(England) Ronnie O'Sullivan	6
(England) Anthony Hamilton	6
(Wales) Ryan Day	4
(Wales) Michael White	4
(England) Shaun Murphy	6
(Belgium) Luca Brecel	6
(England) Mark Selby (2)	4

Semi-finals; Best of 11 frames
(England) Ronnie O'Sullivan	6
(England) Anthony Hamilton	2
(England) Shaun Murphy	6
(Belgium) Luca Brecel	4

Final; Best of 19 frames
(England) Ronnie O'Sullivan	8
(England) Shaun Murphy	10

== Final ==
Final: Best of 19 frames. Referee: Paul Collier. Ricoh Arena, Coventry, England, 12 November 2017.
Ronnie O'Sullivan; England	8–10	Shaun Murphy; England
Afternoon: 103–31 (97), 98–27 (98), 63–68, 1–70 (70), 27–92 (85), 7–82 (53), 134–0 (65, 61), 105–32 (72), 54–57; Evening: 39–92 (86), 37–83, 0–134 (74, 56), 83–46, 17–83 (71), 76–31 (54), 132–0 (108), 106–1 (68), 71–74
108	Highest break	86
1	Century breaks	0
8	50+ breaks	7

== Century breaks ==
Total: 20

- 138, 134, 124, 109, 108, 101 – Ronnie O'Sullivan
- 133 – Anthony Hamilton
- 131, 123, 121, 101 – Shaun Murphy
- 125, 112 – Mark Selby
- 110, 103 – Ryan Day
- 108 – Barry Hawkins
- 105, 103 – Luca Brecel
- 102 – Michael White
- 100 – Marco Fu
