= 2017–18 snooker season =

Series of snooker tournaments

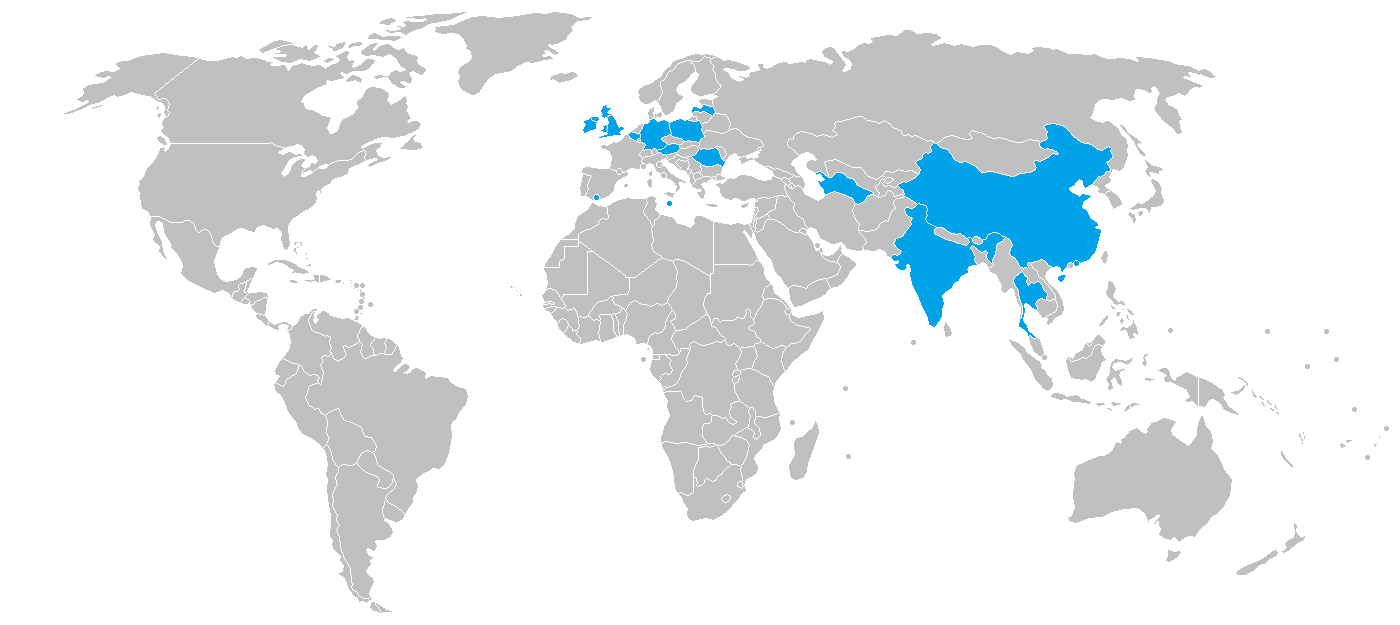
- Nations that hosted an event in the snooker calendar during the 2017–18 season

Details
- Duration: 4 May 2017 – 7 May 2018
- Tournaments: 45 (Note: The three disciplines at the 2017 Asian Indoor and Martial Arts Games were part of the same tournament.) (20 ranking events)

Triple Crown winners
- UK Championship: Ronnie O'Sullivan (ENG)
- Masters: Mark Allen (NIR)
- World Championship: Mark Williams (WAL)

The 2017–18 snooker season was a series of professional snooker tournaments played between 4 May 2017 and 7 May 2018. The season began with the pro–am Vienna Snooker Open in May 2017 and ended with the 2018 World Snooker Championship in April the following year. Ronnie O'Sullivan earned a joint-record five ranking titles in the season. He joined Stephen Hendry (1990/1991), Ding Junhui (2013/2014), and Mark Selby (2016/2017) in winning five ranking titles in the same season.

The China Championship became a ranking event and was brought forward to a mid-August date, ahead of the Paul Hunter Classic. The Shanghai Masters was initially withdrawn from the season calendar, but was later rescheduled for November 2017. The biennial World Cup team event was played in July 2017. Another event not held every year returning in 2017 was the 2017 IWGA World Games. The Snooker Shoot Out was brought forward to the start of February, ahead of both the World Grand Prix and Welsh Open.

The second edition of the Home Nations Series was being held in this season with the English Open, Northern Ireland Open, Scottish Open and Welsh Open tournaments. For a single winner of all four tournaments would earn a bonus of £1 million. 13 different countries and/or regions have held at least one tournament on the main tour during the season, making it one of the most diverse season calendars since the takeover of World Snooker by Matchroom Sport.

A new World Seniors Tour was formed by Snooker Legends for players over 40 years of age, comprising four events, including the World Seniors Championship which has returned to Scunthorpe in 2018.

Ronnie O'Sullivan won five ranking events during the season, with Mark Williams winning three times and Ryan Day, John Higgins and Mark Selby each winning twice. Shaun Murphy reached four ranking event finals during the season but lost them all.

== Players ==
The top 64 players from the prize money rankings after the 2017 World Championship, and the 31 players earning a two-year card the previous year automatically qualified for the season (Rouzi Maimaiti has resigned his membership). Next, eight places were allocated to the top 8 on the One Year Ranking List who have not already qualified for the Main Tour. Another two players came from the EBSA Qualifying Tour Play-Offs, and a further places were available through the 2017 Q School, four from each of the two events and the four best-ranked players in the Order of Merit. The rest of the places on to the tour came from amateur events and national governing body (NGB) nominations. Hamza Akbar received a tour card as a special dispensation in place of America's nomination.

The list of all professional players in the 2017/2018 season consist of 131 players, including the standard field of the 128 players and three invitational tour cards (James Wattana has second year of a two-year invitational tour card while Jimmy White and Ken Doherty were awarded the new two-year permission). Beginning from this season, players with invitational tour cards are eligible to compete in any ranking event. These players are seeded after main tour professionals, but above amateur top ups taken from the Q School ranking list.

=== New professional players ===
All players listed below received a tour card for two seasons.

International champions

1. IBSF World Championship winner: Soheil Vahedi (IRN)
2. IBSF World Under-21 Championship winner: Xu Si (CHN)
3. EBSA European Championship winner: Chris Totten (SCO)
4. EBSA European Under-21 Championship winner: Alexander Ursenbacher (SWI)
5. ACBS Asian Championship winner: Lyu Haotian (CHN)
6. ACBS Asian Under-21 Championship winner: Yuan Sijun (CHN)
7. ABSF African Championships winner: Basem Eltahhan (EGY)
8. Oceania Championship winner: Matthew Bolton (AUS)

One Year Ranking List

9. Sunny Akani (THA)
10. Rhys Clark (SCO)
11. Robin Hull (FIN)
12. Rod Lawler (ENG)
13. Ross Muir (SCO)
14. Nigel Bond (ENG)
15. Eden Sharav (SCO)
16. Ian Burns (ENG)

EBSA Qualifying Tour Play-Offs

17. Gerard Greene (NIR)
18. Peter Lines (ENG)

Q School

Main article: 2017 Q School

Event 1

19. Lukas Kleckers (GER)
20. Allan Taylor (ENG)
21. Billy Joe Castle (ENG)
22. Ashley Hugill (ENG)

Event 2

23. Duane Jones (WAL)
24. Sanderson Lam (ENG)
25. Paul Davison (ENG)
26. Chen Zifan (CHN)

Order of Merit

27. Zhang Yong (CHN)
28. Sean O'Sullivan (ENG)
29. Joe Swail (NIR)
30. Martin O'Donnell (ENG)

CBSA China Tour

31. Li Yuan (CHN)
32. Niu Zhuang (CHN)

Special dispensation

33. Hamza Akbar (PAK)

Invitational Tour Card

34. Jimmy White (ENG)
35. Ken Doherty (IRL)

== Calendar ==
The following tables outline the dates and results of all events of the World Snooker Tour, World Women's Snooker, the World Seniors Tour, and other events.

=== World Snooker Tour ===
Start	Finish	Tournament	Venue	Winner	Score	Runner-up	Ref.
23 Jun	25 Jun	Riga Masters	Arena Riga in Riga, Latvia	Ryan Day (WAL)	5‍–‍2	Stephen Maguire (SCO)	
3 Jul	9 Jul	World Cup†	Wuxi City Sports Park Stadium in Wuxi, China	China A	4‍–‍3	England	
20 Jul	23 Jul	Hong Kong Masters†	Queen Elizabeth Stadium in Bowrington, Hong Kong	Neil Robertson (AUS)	6‍–‍3	Ronnie O'Sullivan (ENG)	
28 Jul	29 Jul	CVB Challenge†	Nanshan Culture & Sports Centre in Shenzhen, China	Great Britain	26‍–‍9	China	
16 Aug	22 Aug	China Championship	Guangzhou Sport University in Guangzhou, China	Luca Brecel (BEL)	10‍–‍5	Shaun Murphy (ENG)	
22 Aug	27 Aug	Paul Hunter Classic	Stadthalle in Fürth, Germany	Michael White (WAL)	4‍–‍2	Shaun Murphy (ENG)	
4 Sep	9 Sep	Six-red World Championship†	Bangkok Convention Center in Bangkok, Thailand	Mark Williams (WAL)	8‍–‍2	Thepchaiya Un-Nooh (THA)	
12 Sep	16 Sep	Indian Open	Novotel Visakhapatnam Varun Beach in Vishakhapatnam, India	John Higgins (SCO)	5‍–‍1	Anthony McGill (SCO)	
18 Sep	24 Sep	World Open	Yushan Number One Middle School in Yushan, China	Ding Junhui (CHN)	10‍–‍3	Kyren Wilson (ENG)	
2 Oct	8 Oct	European Masters	De Soeverein in Lommel, Belgium	Judd Trump (ENG)	9‍–‍7	Stuart Bingham (ENG)	
16 Oct	22 Oct	English Open	Barnsley Metrodome in Barnsley, England	Ronnie O'Sullivan (ENG)	9‍–‍2	Kyren Wilson (ENG)	
29 Oct	5 Nov	International Championship	Baihu Media Broadcasting Centre in Daqing, China	Mark Selby (ENG)	10‍–‍7	Mark Allen (NIR)	
6 Nov	12 Nov	Champion of Champions†	Ricoh Arena in Coventry, England	Shaun Murphy (ENG)	10‍–‍8	Ronnie O'Sullivan (ENG)	
13 Nov	18 Nov	Shanghai Masters	Shanghai Grand Stage in Shanghai, China	Ronnie O'Sullivan (ENG)	10‍–‍3	Judd Trump (ENG)	
20 Nov	26 Nov	Northern Ireland Open	Waterfront Hall in Belfast, Northern Ireland	Mark Williams (WAL)	9‍–‍8	Yan Bingtao (CHN)	
28 Nov	10 Dec	UK Championship	Barbican Centre in York, England	Ronnie O'Sullivan (ENG)	10‍–‍5	Shaun Murphy (ENG)	
11 Dec	17 Dec	Scottish Open	Emirates Arena in Glasgow, Scotland	Neil Robertson (AUS)	9‍–‍8	Cao Yupeng (CHN)	
14 Jan	21 Jan	Masters†	Alexandra Palace in London, England	Mark Allen (NIR)	10‍–‍7	Kyren Wilson (ENG)	
31 Jan	4 Feb	German Masters	Tempodrom in Berlin, Germany	Mark Williams (WAL)	9‍–‍1	Graeme Dott (SCO)	
8 Feb	11 Feb	Shoot Out	Watford Colosseum in Watford, England	Michael Georgiou (CYP)	1‍–‍0	Graeme Dott (SCO)	
19 Feb	25 Feb	World Grand Prix	Preston Guild Hall in Preston, England	Ronnie O'Sullivan (ENG)	10‍–‍3	Ding Junhui (CHN)	
26 Feb	4 Mar	Welsh Open	Motorpoint Arena in Cardiff, Wales	John Higgins (SCO)	9‍–‍7	Barry Hawkins (ENG)	
7 Mar	11 Mar	Gibraltar Open	Tercentenary Sports Hall, Victoria Stadium in Gibraltar, Gibraltar	Ryan Day (WAL)	4‍–‍0	Cao Yupeng (CHN)	
14 Mar	18 Mar	Romanian Masters†	Bucharest Metropolitan Circus in Bucharest, Romania	Ryan Day (WAL)	10‍–‍8	Stuart Bingham (ENG)	
19 Mar	25 Mar	Players Championship	Venue Cymru in Llandudno, Wales	Ronnie O'Sullivan (ENG)	10‍–‍4	Shaun Murphy (ENG)	
2 Jan	29 Mar	Championship League†	Ricoh Arena in Coventry, England	John Higgins (SCO)	3‍–‍2	Zhou Yuelong (CHN)	
2 Apr	8 Apr	China Open	Olympic Sports Center Gymnasium in Beijing, China	Mark Selby (ENG)	11‍–‍3	Barry Hawkins (ENG)	
21 Apr	7 May	World Championship	Crucible Theatre in Sheffield, England	Mark Williams (WAL)	18‍–‍16	John Higgins (SCO)	

Ranking event
† Non-ranking event

=== World Ladies Billiards and Snooker ===
Start	Finish	Tournament	Venue	Winner	Score	Runner-up	Ref.
24 Aug	27 Aug	Paul Hunter Women's Classic	Ballroom in Nuremberg, Germany	Reanne Evans (ENG)	4‍–‍1	Ng On-Yee (HKG)	
30 Sep	1 Oct	UK Women's Championship	Northern Snooker Centre in Leeds, England	Ng On-Yee (HKG)	4‍–‍1	Reanne Evans (ENG)	
28 Oct	29 Oct	Eden Women's Masters	South West Snooker Centre in Quedgeley, England	Ng On-Yee (HKG)	4‍–‍3	Reanne Evans (ENG)	
17 Feb	18 Feb	Women's British Open	Stourbridge Institute in Stourbridge, England	Reanne Evans (ENG)	4‍–‍0	Nutcharut Wongharuthai (THA)	
14 Mar	17 Mar	World Women's Championship	Dolmen Hall in St Paul's Bay, Malta	Ng On-Yee (HKG)	5‍–‍0	Maria Catalano (ENG)	
14 Apr		World Women's 10-Red Championship	Northern Snooker Centre in Leeds, England	Reanne Evans (ENG)	4‍–‍1	Ng On-Yee (HKG)	
15 Apr		World Women's 6-Red Championship	Northern Snooker Centre in Leeds, England	Reanne Evans (ENG)	4‍–‍3	Ng On-Yee (HKG)	

=== World Seniors Tour ===
Start	Finish	Tournament	Venue	Winner	Score	Runner-up	Ref.
24 Oct	26 Oct	UK Seniors Championship	Harlequin Theatre in Redhill, England	Jimmy White (ENG)	4‍–‍2	Ken Doherty (IRL)	
6 Jan	7 Jan	Seniors Irish Masters	Goffs in Kill, Ireland	Steve Davis (ENG)	4‍–‍0	Johnathan Bagley (ENG)	
21 Mar	24 Mar	World Seniors Championship	Baths Hall in Scunthorpe, England	Aaron Canavan (JER)	4‍–‍3	Patrick Wallace (NIR)	
12 Apr		Seniors Masters	Crucible Theatre in Sheffield, England	Cliff Thorburn (CAN)	2‍–‍1	Johnathan Bagley (ENG)	

=== Other events ===
Start	Finish	Tournament	Venue	Winner	Score	Runner-up	Ref.
4 May	7 May	Vienna Open	15 Reds Köö Wien Snooker Club in Vienna, Austria	David Grace (ENG)	5‍–‍2	Nigel Bond (ENG)	
24 May	27 May	Belgium Open	Snooker Club Arena in Ghent, Belgium	Bjorn Haneveer (BEL)	6‍–‍5	Ben Mertens (BEL)	
7 Jun	11 Jun	Pink Ribbon	South West Snooker Academy in Gloucester, England	Robert Milkins (ENG)	4‍–‍2	Rob James (ENG)	
26 Jul	30 Jul	World Games	Wrocław Congress Center in Wrocław, Poland	Kyren Wilson (GBR)	3‍–‍1	Ali Carter (GBR)	
19 Sep	21 Sep	Asian Indoor and Martial Arts Games – Six-red	Billiard Sports Arena in Ashgabat, Turkmenistan	Yan Bingtao (CHN)	5‍–‍1	Soheil Vahedi (IRI)	
22 Sep	24 Sep	Asian Indoor and Martial Arts Games – Team	Billiard Sports Arena in Ashgabat, Turkmenistan	Iran	3‍–‍0	Qatar	
24 Sep	26 Sep	Asian Indoor and Martial Arts Games – Singles	Billiard Sports Arena in Ashgabat, Turkmenistan	Zhao Xintong (CHN)	4‍–‍2	Hossein Vafaei (IRI)	
23 Oct	27 Oct	Haining Open	Haining Sports Center in Haining, China	Mark Selby (ENG)	5‍–‍1	Tom Ford (ENG)	

== Points distribution ==
2017/2018 points distribution for World Snooker Tour ranking events:

Round Tournament	R144	R128	R80	R64	R48	R32	R16	QF	SF	F	W
Riga Masters	—	£0	—	£1,000	—	£2,000	£4,000	£6,000	£15,000	£25,000	£50,000
China Championship	—	£0	—	£4,000	—	£7,000	£12,000	£18,000	£32,000	£75,000	£150,000
Paul Hunter Classic	—	£0	—	£600	—	£1,000	£1,725	£3,000	£4,500	£10,000	£20,000
Indian Open	—	£0	—	£2,000	—	£4,000	£6,000	£10,000	£15,000	£25,000	£50,000
World Open	—	£0	—	£4,000	—	£7,000	£12,000	£18,000	£32,000	£75,000	£150,000
European Masters	—	£0	—	£2,000	—	£4,000	£6,000	£11,000	£17,500	£35,000	£75,000
English Open	—	£0	—	£2,500	—	£3,500	£6,000	£10,000	£20,000	£30,000	£70,000
International Championship	—	£0	—	£4,000	—	£8,500	£13,500	£21,500	£32,000	£75,000	£150,000
Shanghai Masters	—	£0	—	£4,000	—	£7,000	£12,000	£18,000	£32,000	£75,000	£150,000
Northern Ireland Open	—	£0	—	£2,500	—	£3,500	£6,000	£10,000	£20,000	£30,000	£70,000
UK Championship	—	£0	—	£5,000	—	£10,000	£15,000	£22,500	£35,000	£75,000	£170,000
Scottish Open	—	£0	—	£2,500	—	£3,500	£6,000	£10,000	£20,000	£30,000	£70,000
German Masters	—	£0	—	£2,000	—	£4,000	£5,000	£10,000	£20,000	£35,000	£80,000
Shoot Out	—	£0 (Note: First round losers in the Shoot Out received £250 prize money which did not count towards the prize money rankings.)	—	£500	—	£1,000	£2,000	£4,000	£8,000	£16,000	£32,000
World Grand Prix	—	—	—	—	—	£5,000	£7,500	£12,500	£20,000	£40,000	£100,000
Welsh Open	—	£0	—	£2,500	—	£3,500	£6,000	£10,000	£20,000	£30,000	£70,000
Gibraltar Open	—	£0	—	£1,000	—	£2,000	£3,000	£4,000	£6,000	£12,000	£25,000
Players Championship	—	—	—	—	—	—	£10,000	£15,000	£30,000	£50,000	£125,000
China Open	—	£0	—	£5,000	—	£11,000	£18,000	£27,000	£45,000	£90,000	£225,000
World Championship	£0	—	£9,000	—	£13,500	£18,000 (Note: Players who lose their first match receive no ranking points.)	£27,500	£42,500	£85,000	£180,000	£425,000
