= Snooker at the 2017 World Games – mixed singles =

Snooker mixed singles at the 2017 World Games
- Venue: Wrocław Congress Center, Wrocław, Poland
- Dates: 26–30 July 2017
- Competitors: 16 from 13 nations

Medalists
gold medal	(United Kingdom) Kyren Wilson
silver medal	(United Kingdom) Ali Carter
bronze medal	(Iran) Soheil Vahedi

The mixed singles snooker competition at the 2017 World Games took place from 26 to 30 July 2017 at the Wrocław Congress Center in Wrocław, Poland.

Aditya Mehta, the defending champion, lost 1–3 in the first round to Kacper Filipiak.

== Bracket ==
Round of 16
(United Kingdom) Ali Carter	3
(Australia) Shaun Dalitz	0
(United Kingdom) Declan Brennan	3
(Belgium) Wendy Jans	1
(India) Aditya Mehta	1
(Poland) Kacper Filipiak	3
(Pakistan) Mohammad Bilal	0
(China) Xu Si	3
(Iran) Soheil Vahedi	3
(South Africa) Peter Francisco	1
(Switzerland) Alexander Ursenbacher	3
(United Kingdom) Andrew Pagett	1
(Hong Kong) Ng On Yee	2
(Republic of Ireland) Michael Judge	3
(Estonia) Andres Petrov	1
(United Kingdom) Kyren Wilson	3

Quarter-finals
(United Kingdom) Ali Carter	3
(United Kingdom) Declan Brennan	1
(Poland) Kacper Filipiak	2
(China) Xu Si	3
(Iran) Soheil Vahedi	3
(Switzerland) Alexander Ursenbacher	1
(Republic of Ireland) Michael Judge	1
(United Kingdom) Kyren Wilson	3

Semi-finals
(United Kingdom) Ali Carter	3
(China) Xu Si	0
(Iran) Soheil Vahedi	0
(United Kingdom) Kyren Wilson	3

Final
(United Kingdom) Ali Carter	1
(United Kingdom) Kyren Wilson	3
Third place
(China) Xu Si	2
(Iran) Soheil Vahedi	3

=== Final ===
Final: Best of 5 frames. Referee: Wiktoria Jedruszek; Wrocław Congress Center, Wrocław, Poland, 30 July 2017
Kyren Wilson; United Kingdom	3–1	Ali Carter; United Kingdom
75–0, 61–12, 1–113 (113), 81–0 (77)
77	Highest break	113
0	Century breaks	1
1	50+ breaks	1

== Century breaks ==
- 136, 113 – Ali Carter
- 127 – Kyren Wilson
