= 2017 World Snooker Championship =

Professional snooker tournament

2017 Betfred World Snooker Championship

Tournament information
- Dates: 15 April – 1 May 2017
- Venue: Crucible Theatre
- City: Sheffield
- Country: England
- Organisation: World Snooker
- Format: Ranking event
- Total prize fund: £1,750,000
- Winner's share: £375,000
- Highest break: Ronnie O'Sullivan (ENG) (146)

Final
- Champion: Mark Selby (ENG)
- Runner-up: John Higgins (SCO)
- Score: 18–15

The 2017 World Snooker Championship (officially the 2017 Betfred World Snooker Championship) was a professional snooker tournament that took place from 15 April to 1 May 2017 at the Crucible Theatre in Sheffield, England. It was the 19th and final ranking event of the 2016–17 season which followed the China Open. It was the 41st consecutive year that the World Snooker Championship had been held at the Crucible.

The winner of the event was the defending champion and world number one Mark Selby, who defeated John Higgins 18–15 in the final. Selby won despite having fallen 4–10 behind in the second session of the match. Selby defeated Ding Junhui 17–15 in the semi-finals whilst Higgins defeated Barry Hawkins 17–8 to reach the final. This was Selby's third World Championship win; he had also won the tournament in the 2014 and 2016 tournaments.

The total prize fund for the championship was £1,750,000, the winner receiving the top prize of £375,000. There were 74 century breaks in the main stage of the championship, and a further 84 in qualifying. Englishman Ronnie O'Sullivan compiled a break of 146 in the quarter-finals, the highest of the tournament. Gary Wilson scored a maximum break of 147 in qualifying during his first round win over Josh Boileau. The tournament was broadcast in Europe by the BBC and Eurosport, and internationally by World Snooker on Facebook.

== Overview ==
The World Snooker Championship is an annual cue sport tournament and the official world championship of the game of snooker. Founded in the late 19th century by British Army soldiers stationed in India, the sport was popular in Great Britain. In modern times it has been played worldwide, especially in East and Southeast Asian nations such as China, Hong Kong and Thailand.

The 2017 tournament featured 32 professional players competing in one-on-one snooker matches played over several frames, using a single elimination format. The 32 players were selected for the event through a mix of the snooker world rankings, and a pre-tournament qualification competition. The first world championship in 1927 was won by Joe Davis, the final being held in Camkin's Hall, Birmingham, England. Since 1977, the event has been held at the Crucible Theatre in Sheffield, England. As of 2022, Stephen Hendry and Ronnie O’Sullivan are the event's most successful participants in the modern era, having both won the championship seven times. Mark Selby had won the previous year's championship by defeating China's Ding Junhui in the final 18–14. This was Selby's third world title, having also won the championship in 2014. The event was organised by World Snooker, a subsidiary of the World Professional Billiards and Snooker Association, and sponsored by sports betting company Betfred.

=== Format ===
The 2017 World Snooker Championship took place between 15 April and 1 May 2017 in Sheffield, England. The tournament was the last of 19 ranking events in the 2016–17 snooker season on the World Snooker Tour. It featured a 32-player main draw that was held at the Crucible Theatre, as well as a 128-player qualifying draw that was played at the English Institute of Sport, Sheffield, from 5 to 12 April, concluding three days before the start of the main draw. This was the 41st consecutive year that the tournament had been staged at the Crucible, and it was the 49th successive world championship to be contested using the modern knockout format.

The top 16 players in the latest world rankings automatically qualified for the main draw as seeded players. Mark Selby was seeded first overall as the defending champion, and the remaining 15 seeds were allocated based on the world rankings released after the China Open. The number of frames required to win a match increased with each proceeding round of the main draw, the first round consisting of best-of-19 frames matches, the final match being played over a maximum of 35 frames.

All 16 non-seeded spots in the main draw were filled with players from the qualifying rounds. The draw for the qualifying competition consisted of 128 players, including 110 of the remaining 112 players on the World Snooker Tour, as well as 18 wildcard places assigned to non-tour players. (Note: Tour players Jamie Burnett and Rouzi Maimaiti both pulled out from the event.) These invited players included the women's world champion and the European junior champion. Half of the participants in the qualifying draw were seeded players: those ranked from 17th to 80th were allocated one of 64 seeds in world ranking order; the other participants were placed randomly into the draw. To reach the main draw at the Crucible, players were required to win three best-of-19 frames qualifying matches.

=== Prize fund ===
The total prize money for the event was raised to £1,750,000 from the previous year's prize fund of £1,500,100. The winner of the event won £375,000. A breakdown of prize money for the 2017 World Snooker Championship is shown below.

- Winner: £375,000
- Runner-up: £160,000
- Semi-final: £75,000
- Quarter-final: £37,500
- Last 16: £25,000
- Last 32: £16,000
- Last 48: £12,000
- Last 80: £8,000
- Total: £1,750,000

The "rolling 147 prize" awarded for a maximum break was £5,000, which was won by Gary Wilson in qualifying.

=== Coverage ===
The 2017 World Snooker Championship was broadcast throughout Europe by both BBC TV and Eurosport. The tournament was streamed internationally on Facebook for the first time, specifically for portions of South America and Asia. The event was also broadcast in North America on Facebook, and the final was aired on the Eleven Sports Network.

== Tournament summary ==
=== Seeding and qualifying rounds ===
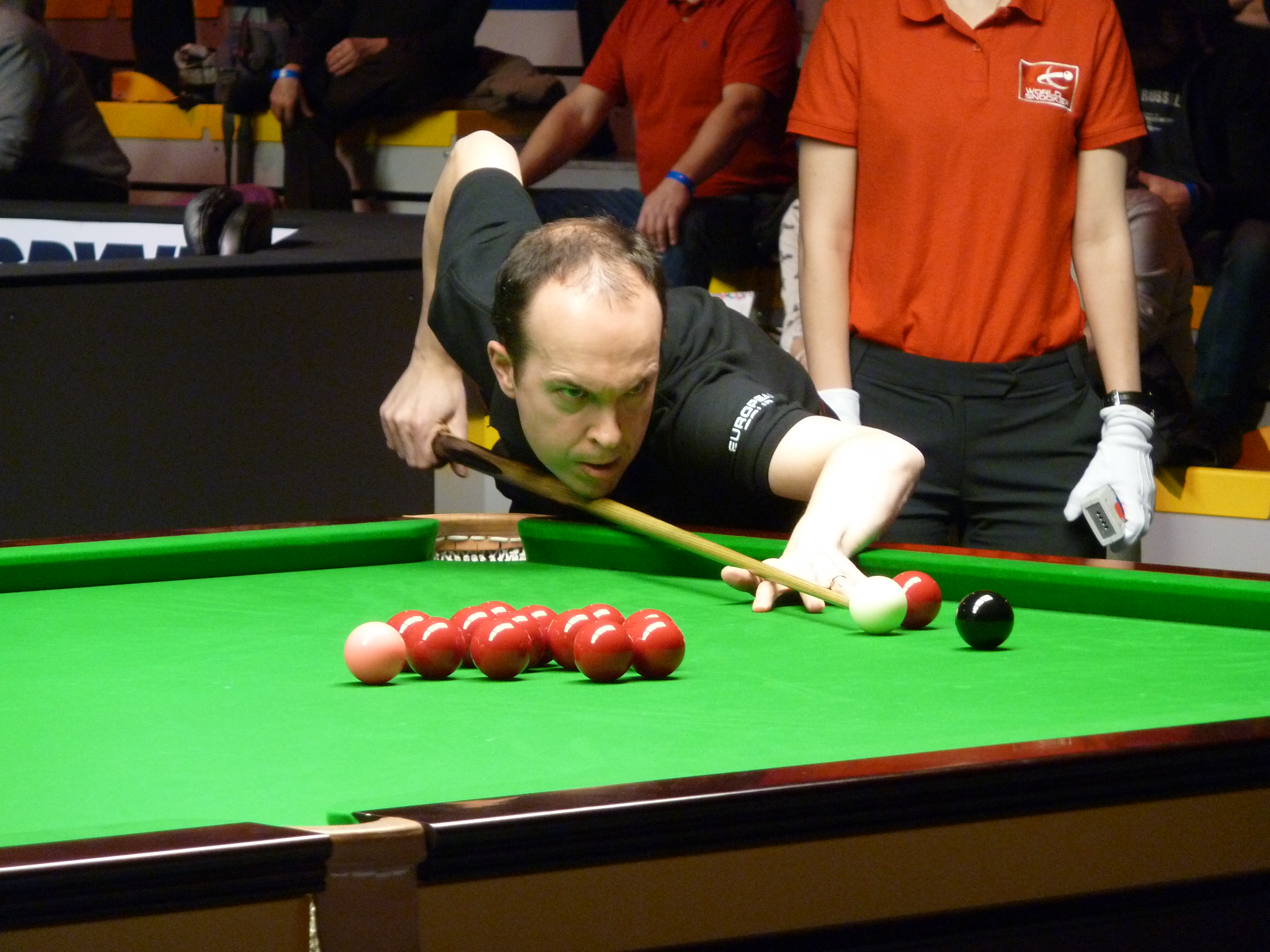
Fergal O'Brien won the longest frame in the modern era of snooker, which lasted for more than two hours, to reach the main competition.

The top 16 ranked players in the world automatically qualified as seeds for the first round of the main stage at the Crucible. Defending champion Mark Selby was seeded first and the other 15 seeding allocations were based on the latest world rankings from after the China Open. The players ranked from 17th position entered the competition in the first round of qualifying and were required to win three best-of-19 frames matches to qualify for the main tournament. The three qualifying rounds were held at the Ponds Forge International Sports Centre in Sheffield from 5 to 12 April 2017.

Two-time world champion Mark Williams took part in qualifying, having failed to regain his place in the top 16. He lost 7–10 to Stuart Carrington in his third qualifying match and missed the knockout stage for only the second time since 1996. Williams qualified at the following year's event, where he defeated John Higgins 18–16 in the final to win his third world title.

The deciding frame of the third-round qualifying match between Fergal O'Brien and David Gilbert on 12 April was the longest frame on record in the modern era of the game; lasting for 123 minutes and 41 seconds, it broke the previous record of 100 minutes and 24 seconds set by Alan McManus and Barry Pinches in 2015. Gary Wilson made the 131st officially recognised maximum break, the second of his career, in the fourth frame of his first-round qualifying match against Josh Boileau on 6 April. Wilson was one of five players to qualify for the main stage of the championship at the Crucible for the first time, the other four debutants being David Grace, Noppon Saengkham, Yan Bingtao, and Zhou Yuelong. The draw for the first round of the main competition took place at 10:00 a.m. BST on 13 April 2017.

=== First round ===
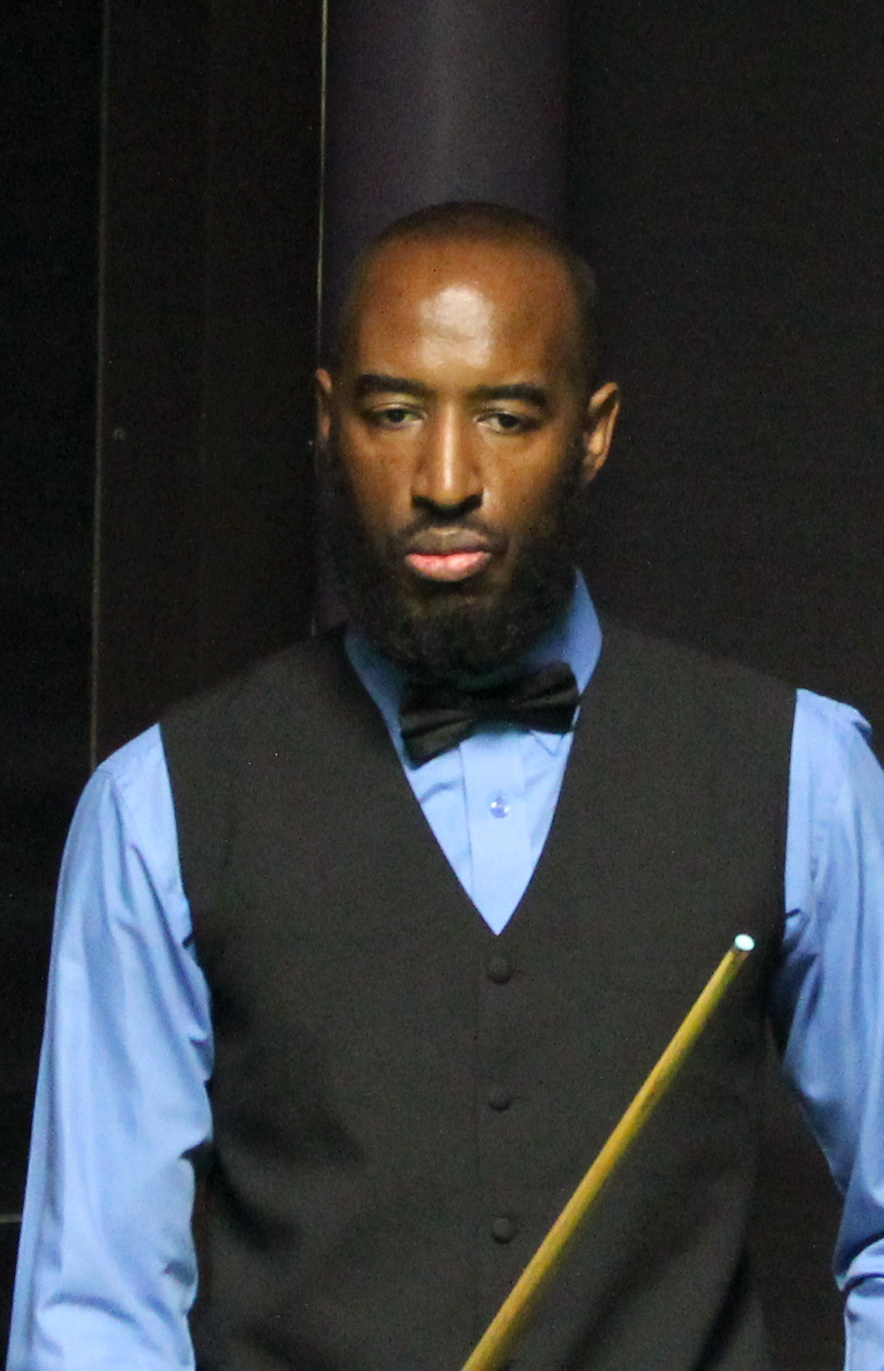
Rory McLeod defeated second seed Judd Trump in the first round.

The first round of the championship took place between 15 and 20 April 2017. All matches were played as best-of-19 frames held over two sessions. Having been eliminated in the first round at the Crucible in the four years since his 2012 semi-final appearance, Stephen Maguire defeated fellow Scot Anthony McGill 10–2 to progress to the second round for the first time in five years. In his 25th consecutive appearance at the World Championship, Ronnie O'Sullivan withstood a fightback from qualifier Gary Wilson—who had recovered from 5–9 down to 7–9 down—to win their first round match 10–7. In doing so, O'Sullivan secured a place in the last 16 for the 14th year in a row, equalling the record set by Terry Griffiths in 1996.

Elsewhere, Marco Fu trailed Luca Brecel 0–5, 1–7 and 4–8 before winning 10–9 in the first round. Third seed Stuart Bingham played 2002 world champion Peter Ebdon, who was appearing at the Crucible for the 24th time since first qualifying in 1992. Ebdon won the final frame of the first session despite needing 15 points from foul shots with just the colours remaining; he achieved the three snookers needed, and potted the respotted black to bring the score to 4–5. He won just one more frame before losing 5–10 to Bingham.

Qualifier Rory McLeod defeated second seed Judd Trump 10–8 after trailing 0–4. Before the tournament Trump had declared that he "honestly believe [he] can play to a standard which is very rare nowadays," and that he was "the best" in the world. His poor performance in the match, which ran into a third session, was exacerbated by a shoulder injury that was causing him visible pain when down on shots. This resulted in 46-year-old McLeod becoming the oldest player to reach the last 16 since Steve Davis' quarter-final run in 2010 aged 52. McLeod commented that his victory was "the best win of [his] career, to beat Judd Trump on centre stage is brilliant."

In an all-Chinese match, fourth seed Ding Junhui defeated debutant Zhou Yuelong 10–5 to reach the last 16. Ali Carter lost 7–10 in a tense encounter with 2006 world champion Graeme Dott, which Carter blamed on his poor start to the match. The 2010 world champion Neil Robertson made his 500th career century during his 10–4 first round win over Noppon Saengkham. In his first-round loss to Liang Wenbo, Stuart Carrington became only the fifth player, after John Higgins, Ronnie O'Sullivan, Mark Selby, and Neil Robertson, to make century breaks in three consecutive frames in a World Championship match; Liang won the match 10–7. Xiao Guodong defeated Wales' sole representative Ryan Day 10–4, which Day referred to as "embarrassing". This was the first event since 1969 where the second round contained no Welsh players.

Seven former world champions progressed to the second round: Selby, Bingham, O'Sullivan, Higgins, Robertson, Dott and Shaun Murphy. Ebdon was the only former champion in the main draw not to reach the last 16. None of the five debutants made it to the second round.

=== Second round ===
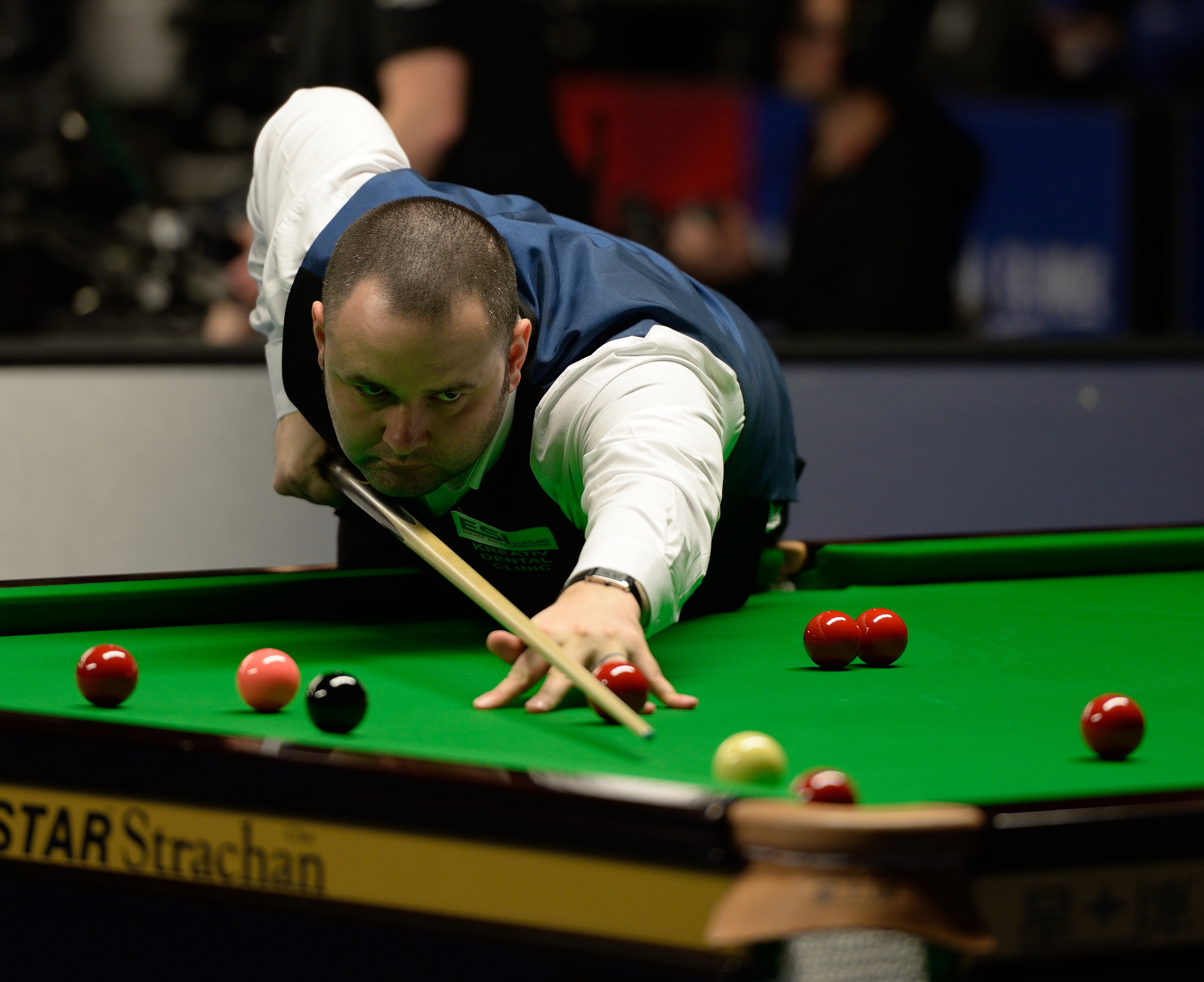
Stephen Maguire reached the last eight for the first time since 2012, the only unseeded player to progress to the quarter-finals.

The second round of the championship took place from 20 to 24 April 2017, matches being played as best-of-25 frames over three sessions. At this stage, 12 of the 16 seeded players remained in the competition. Kyren Wilson advanced to his second consecutive World Championship quarter-final by defeating third seed Stuart Bingham 13–10. Five-time world champion Ronnie O'Sullivan beat Shaun Murphy 13–7, to set up his 18th quarter-final appearance at the Crucible. Having dispatched Zhou Yuelong in the first round, Ding Junhui played in a second consecutive all-Chinese match, defeating fellow countryman Liang Wenbo 13–12.

Four-time world champion John Higgins defeated Mark Allen 13–9, having trailed 3–5 after the first session. Stephen Maguire defeated Rory McLeod 13–3 with a session to spare to reach his first World Championship quarter-final since 2012. Maguire was the only unseeded player to progress to the quarter-finals. Defending champion Mark Selby defeated Xiao Guodong 13–6, commenting afterwards, "I don't feel as though I have peaked". Marco Fu won 13–11, after his opponent Neil Robertson missed the final black in the 24th frame which would have sent their match into a deciding frame.

=== Quarter-finals ===
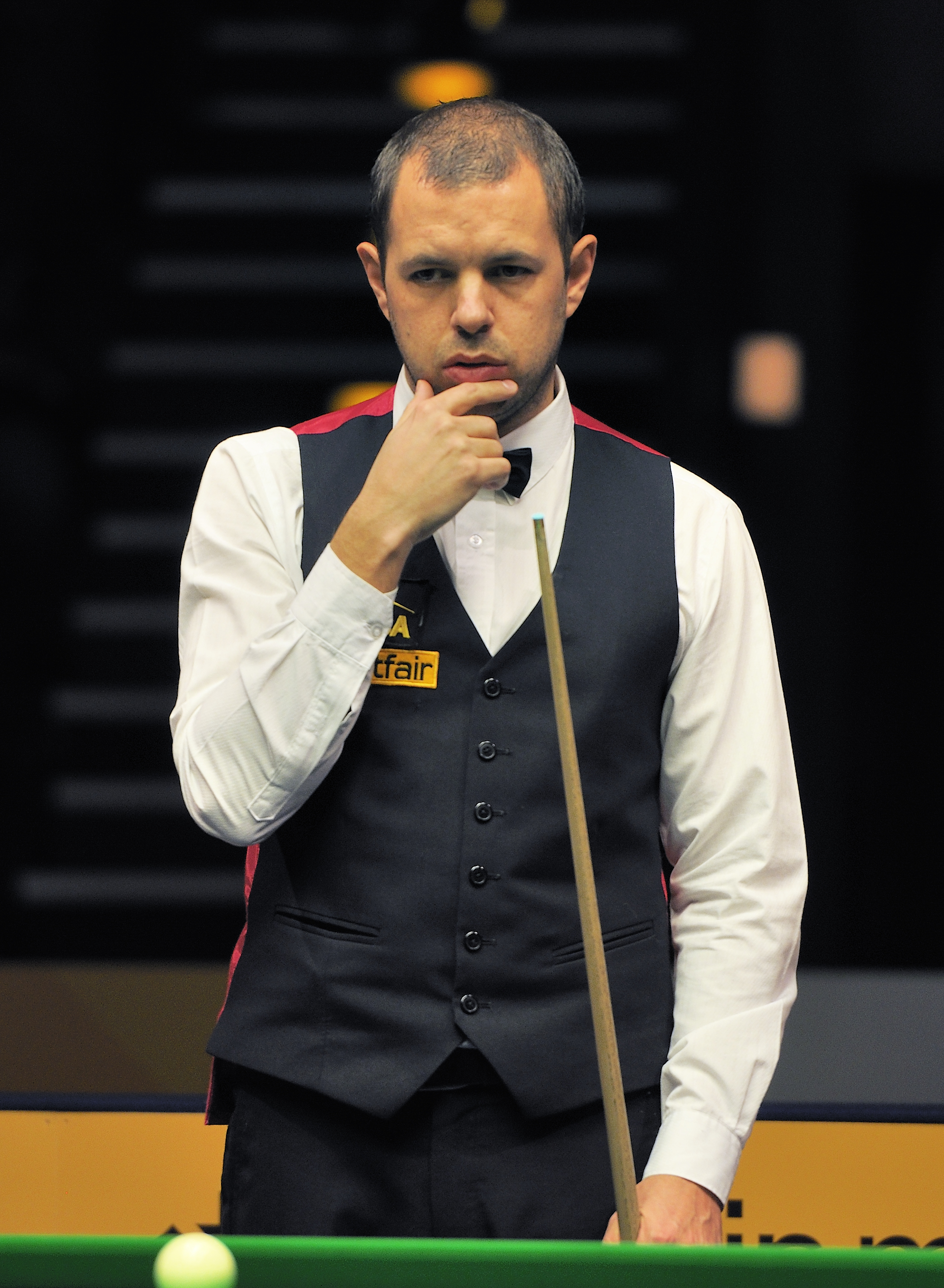
Barry Hawkins reached the World Championship semi-finals for the fourth time in five years.

The quarter-finals were played on 25 and 26 April 2017, as best-of-25 frames matches divided over three sessions. John Higgins won all three sessions of his match against Kyren Wilson and triumphed 13–6, to advance to his first semi-final since winning the event in 2011. With the score tied at 3–3 in the first session, Wilson miscued and split his cue tip, requiring a 15-minute break to carry out the repair. The two players would meet in the semi-finals of the following year's tournament, which Higgins won 17–13.

Defending champion Mark Selby defeated Marco Fu 13–3 with a session to spare. Selby's victory included a break of 143 in frame 15, which BBC commentator Stephen Hendry described as "one of the best [breaks] I've ever seen." After the match, Fu commented that Selby was "unplayable at times" and predicted that he would win the championship.

Ding Junhui defeated Ronnie O'Sullivan 13–10 in their quarter-final encounter. Ding developed an early 3–0 lead, but O'Sullivan fought back to level the first session at 4–4. Ding dominated the second session and opened up a 10–6 overnight lead. O'Sullivan took the first two frames of the final session to reduce his deficit to 8–10; the next four frames were shared equally, before Ding concluded the match in frame 23. O'Sullivan attempted a 147 maximum break in frame 20, but he ran out of position after potting the 13th red and was forced to take the pink instead of the black; his consequent clearance of 146 was the highest break of the championship.

Stephen Maguire was defeated 9–13 by Barry Hawkins, who reached his fourth Crucible semi-final in five years. Hawkins led 9–7 after the first two sessions, but Maguire took the next two frames—including a 135 clearance in frame 17—to tie the match at 9–9. Hawkins then won the next four frames straight to round out the match.

=== Semi-finals ===
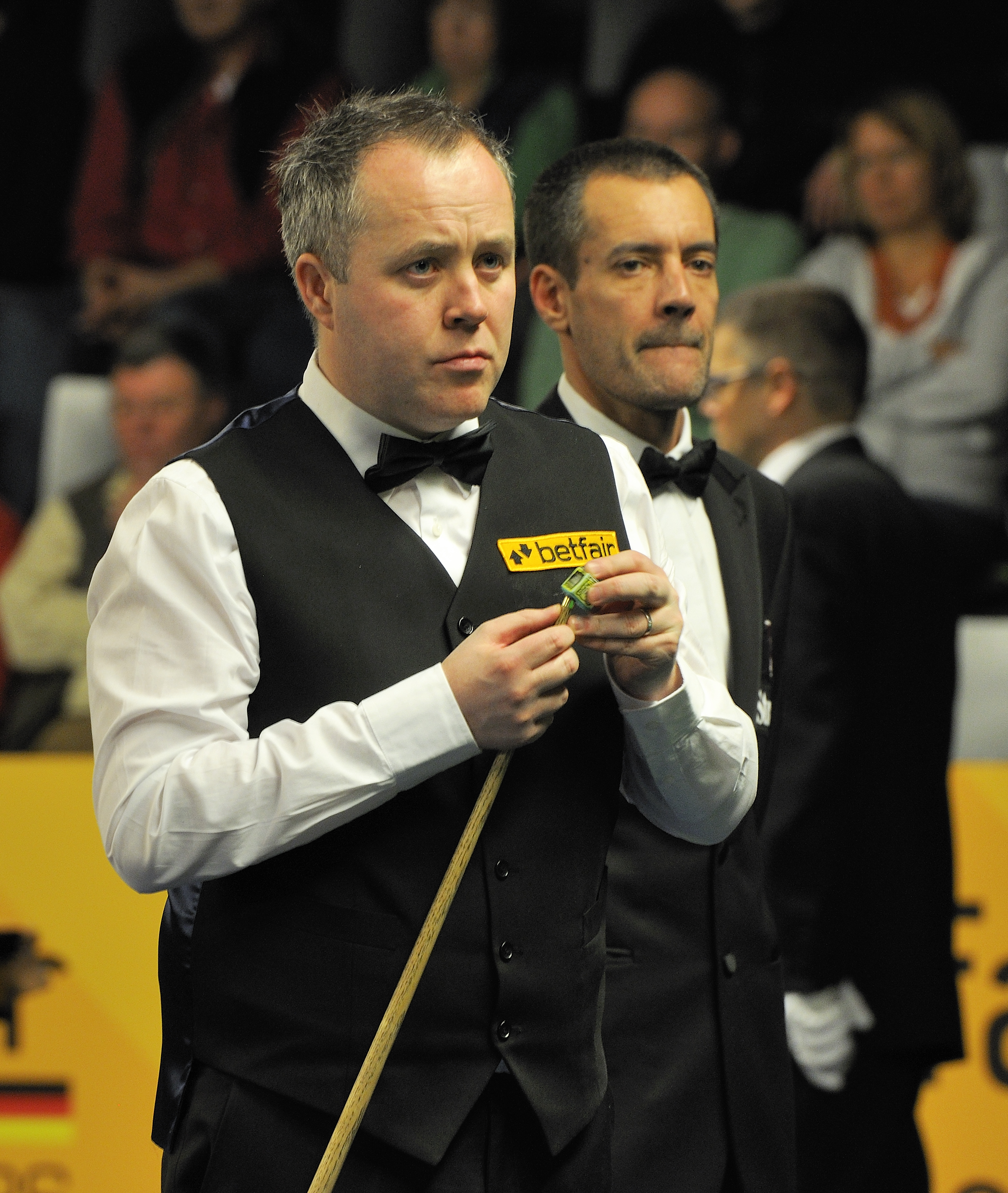
John Higgins defeated Barry Hawkins in the semi-finals to reach his sixth World Championship final.

The semi-finals, which took place from 27 to 29 April 2017, were played as best-of-33 frames matches divided over four sessions. A single table was used for both matches, successive sessions of play alternating between the two semi-finals. Defending champion Mark Selby played fourth seed Ding Junhui in the first semi-final, which was a rematch of the previous year's final. Selby held the lead for most of the match, before Ding drew level at 12–12 after three sessions. Selby then won four of the next five frames, to lead 16–13, requiring just one more frame to win the match. Ding persevered to win two further frames, before Selby scored a break of 72 to triumph 17–15.

Sixth seed John Higgins played seventh seed Barry Hawkins in the other semi-final. Higgins held the lead after each of the first three sessions, at 5–3, 10–6, and 16–8, before winning the match 17–8 in the first frame of the final session. World Snooker described his semi-final win as a "demolition". With the victory, Higgins qualified for his first World Championship final in six years and his sixth overall, the first being 19 years previously when he won his first world title in 1998.

=== Final ===
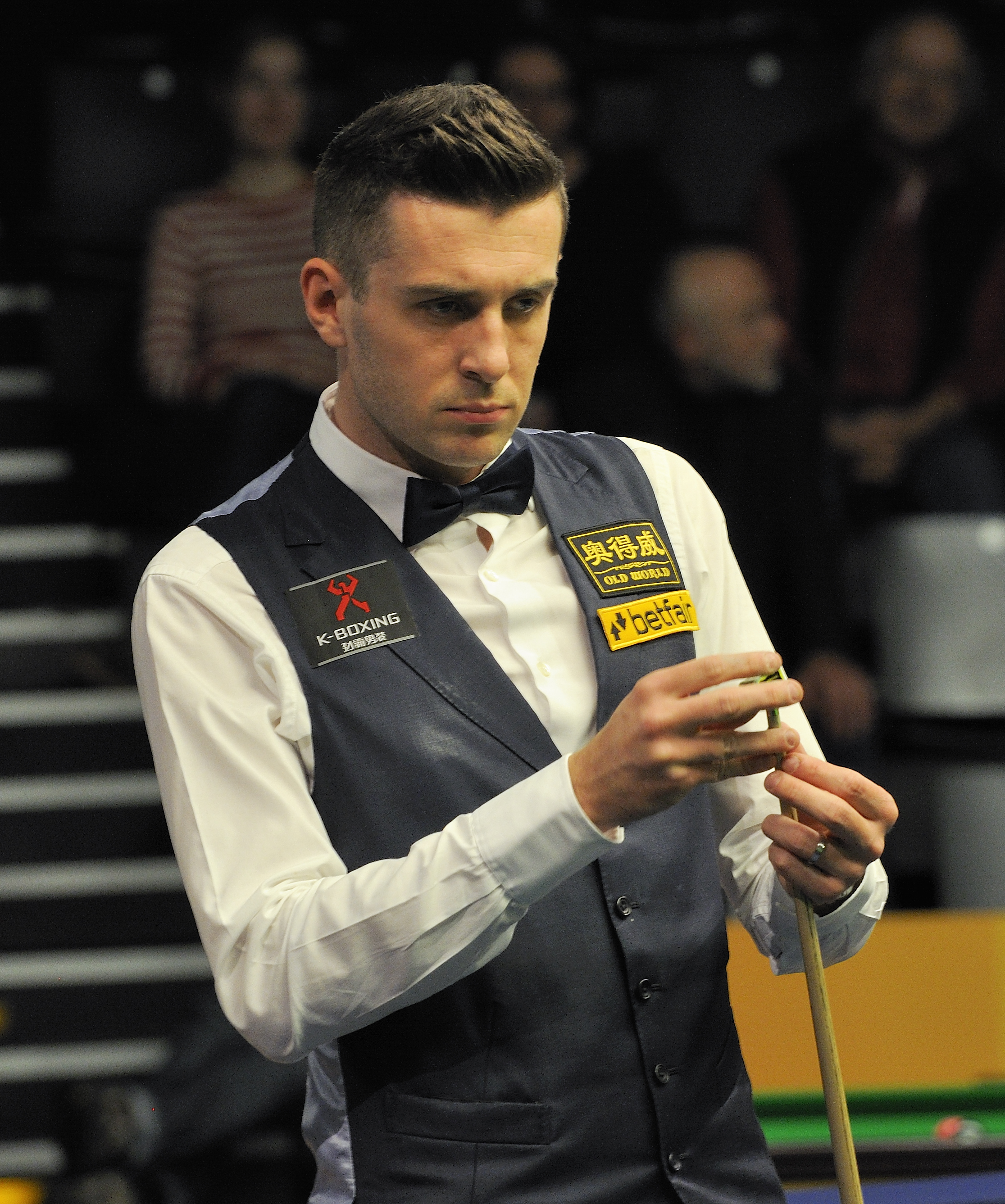
Defending champion Mark Selby claimed his third world title in four years by winning the final 18–15.

The final was played on 30 April and 1 May 2017 between first seed Mark Selby and sixth seed John Higgins. It was a best-of-35 frames match, spread over four sessions. This final was a rematch of the 2007 World Championship final, where Higgins had defeated Selby 18–13. In reaching the 2017 final, Higgins became the second-oldest Crucible world finalist at 41 years and 11 months, behind Ray Reardon who had played in the 1982 final aged 49. The other quadragenarians to have played in a world final at the Crucible were John Spencer and Terry Griffiths. (Note: Higgins reached the final again the following year, aged 42 (his opponent Mark Williams was aged 43), and again in 2019, aged 43.)

Higgins led 6–2 after the first session and 10–4 during the second, before finishing the first day 10–7 ahead. Selby fought back on the second day to win six of the first seven frames, and he was leading 13–11 by the end of the third session. The next six frames were shared equally and Selby maintained his two-frame lead at 16–14. In frame 31, he played a shot to roll up to the black ball; despite his conviction that he had made contact, Selby was told by referee Jan Verhaas that he had missed the ball, for which he received a seven-point penalty. Higgins then won the frame to take the score to 16–15. After compiling a 131 break in frame 32, Selby won the championship with a break of 75 in frame 33, bringing the final match score to 18–15.

Selby had achieved his victory after falling behind by six frames at the end of the first day's play. He became the fourth player (after Steve Davis, Stephen Hendry, and Ronnie O'Sullivan) to defend the world title in the Crucible era. He also became the third player (after Hendry and Ding Junhui) to win five full ranking titles in a single season, the first player to win the China Open and the world title back-to-back, and the first player to win over £1,000,000 across the two-year rolling prize money list. In reaching the final, Higgins moved to second in the world rankings, behind Selby.

== Main draw ==
The numbers in parentheses beside some of the players are their seeding ranks. Match winners are shown in bold.

**First round** Best of 19 frames
15 April
**Mark Selby (ENG) (1)**	**10**
Fergal O'Brien (IRL)	2
19 April
Ryan Day (WAL) (16)	4
**Xiao Guodong (CHN)**	**10**
19 & 20 April
**Neil Robertson (AUS) (9)**	**10**
Noppon Saengkham (THA)	4
16 & 17 April
**Marco Fu (HKG) (8)**	**10**
Luca Brecel (BEL)	9
16 & 17 April
**Shaun Murphy (ENG) (5)**	**10**
Yan Bingtao (CHN)	8
15 & 16 April
**Ronnie O'Sullivan (ENG) (12)**	**10**
Gary Wilson (ENG)	7
18 April
**Liang Wenbo (CHN) (13)**	**10**
Stuart Carrington (ENG)	7
17 & 18 April
**Ding Junhui (CHN) (4)**	**10**
Zhou Yuelong (CHN)	5
16 & 17 April
**Stuart Bingham (ENG) (3)**	**10**
Peter Ebdon (ENG)	5
15 & 16 April
**Kyren Wilson (ENG) (14)**	**10**
David Grace (ENG)	6
16 & 17 April
**Mark Allen (NIR) (11)**	**10**
Jimmy Robertson (ENG)	8
17 & 18 April
**John Higgins (SCO) (6)**	**10**
Martin Gould (ENG)	6
19 & 20 April
**Barry Hawkins (ENG) (7)**	**10**
Tom Ford (ENG)	3
18 & 19 April
Ali Carter (ENG) (10)	7
**Graeme Dott (SCO)**	**10**
15 April
Anthony McGill (SCO) (15)	2
**Stephen Maguire (SCO)**	**10**
18 & 19 April
Judd Trump (ENG) (2)	8
**Rory McLeod (ENG)**	**10**

**Second round** Best of 25 frames
22, 23 & 24 April
(England) **Mark Selby (1)**	**13**
(China) Xiao Guodong	6
23 & 24 April
(Australia) Neil Robertson (9)	11
(Hong Kong) **Marco Fu (8)**	**13**
20, 21 & 22 April
(England) Shaun Murphy (5)	7
(England) **Ronnie O'Sullivan (12)**	**13**
21 & 22 April
(China) Liang Wenbo (13)	12
(China) **Ding Junhui (4)**	**13**
20 & 21 April
(England) Stuart Bingham (3)	10
(England) **Kyren Wilson (14)**	**13**
21 & 22 April
(Northern Ireland) Mark Allen (11)	9
(Scotland) **John Higgins (6)**	**13**
23 & 24 April
(England) **Barry Hawkins (7)**	**13**
(Scotland) Graeme Dott	6
22 & 23 April
(Scotland) **Stephen Maguire**	**13**
(England) Rory McLeod	3

**Quarter-finals**; Best of 25 frames
25 & 26 April
(England) **Mark Selby (1)**	**13**
(Hong Kong) Marco Fu (8)	3
25 & 26 April
(England) Ronnie O'Sullivan (12)	10
(China) **Ding Junhui (4)**	**13**
25 & 26 April
(England) Kyren Wilson (14)	6
(Scotland) **John Higgins (6)**	**13**
25 & 26 April
(England) **Barry Hawkins (7)**	**13**
(Scotland) Stephen Maguire	9

**Semi-finals**; Best of 33 frames
27, 28 & 29 April
(England) **Mark Selby (1)**	**17**
(China) Ding Junhui (4)	15
27, 28 & 29 April
(Scotland) **John Higgins (6)**	**17**
(England) Barry Hawkins (7)	8

**Final**; Best of 35 frames
30 April & 1 May
(England) **Mark Selby (1)**	**18**
(Scotland) John Higgins (6)	15

**Final** (Best of 35 frames) Crucible Theatre, Sheffield, 30 April & 1 May. Referee: Jan Verhaas
**Mark Selby (1)**; England	**18**–15	John Higgins (6); Scotland
**76**–34 (76), 7–50, **121**–8 (62, 58), 0–141 (141), 40–99 (63), 1–126 (95), 54–59 (58), 33–68	Session 1 Session score: (2–**6**), Match score: 2–**6**	76–34 (76), 7–**50**, 121–8 (62, 58), 0–**141** (141), 40–**99** (63), 1–**126** (95), 54–**59** (58), 33–**68**
**86**–0 (86), 8–60, 44–74, **69**–22, 1–68, 0–76 (76), **81**–9 (81), **121**–12 (121), **96**–17	Session 2 Session score: (**5**–4), Match score: 7–**10**	86–0 (86), 8–**60**, 44–**74**, 69–22, 1–**68**, 0–**76** (76), 81–9 (81), 121–12 (121), 96–17
**76**–1, **53**–2, 29–107 (78), **63**–40, **68**–19 (67), **82**–0 (58), **72**–0 (72)	Session 3 Session score: (**6**–1), Match score **13**–11	76–1, 53–2, 29–**107** (78), 63–40, 68–19 (67), 82–0 (58), 72–0 (72)
**72**–22, 36–74, **76**–1 (71), **134**–4 (54, 70), 34–88 (88), 0–119 (111), 47–74, **132**–0 (131), **80**–19 (75)	Session 4 Session score: (**5**–4), Match score **18**–15	72–22, 36–**74**, 76–1 (71), 134–4 (54, 70), 34–**88** (88), 0–**119** (111), 47–**74**, 132–0 (131), 80–19 (75)
131	Highest break	**141**
2	Century breaks	2
**14**	50+ breaks	8
**Mark Selby** wins the 2017 Betfred World Snooker Championship.

== Qualifying ==
Qualifying for the 2017 World Snooker Championship took place from 5 to 12 April 2017, at the Ponds Forge International Sports Centre in Sheffield. There were 128 competitors who took part in the three qualifying rounds; the 16 winners of the third round matches progressed to the main stage of the tournament at the Crucible Theatre, also in Sheffield. All qualifying matches were played as best-of-19 frames. The 128 players that entered the qualifying competition included tour players ranked outside the top 16, and 16 amateur players, all of whom achieved success through the WPBSA qualifying criteria. The following amateur players were invited to compete:

- Home Nations NGB qualifiers: Jackson Page, Tyler Rees, Ross Vallance, Chris Totten, Jordan Brown, Patrick Wallace, Jamie Bodle, Wayne Townsend
- 2016 IBSF World Under-21 Snooker Championship winner: Xu Si
- 2017 EBSA European Snooker Championship runner-up: Andres Petrov (tournament won by Chris Totten, who had already qualified)
- 2017 EBSA European Under-21 Snooker Championship winner: Alexander Ursenbacher
- EBSA Order of Merit 2016/17: Gerard Greene, Zack Richardson
- 2017 World Seniors Championship winner: Peter Lines
- 2016 WLBS World Women's Championship winner: Reanne Evans
- 2017 WLBS World Women's Championship winner: Ng On-yee

The winner of the 2016 IBSF World Snooker Championship, Soheil Vahedi of Iran, was also invited but could not obtain a visa in time to compete. Two amateur players, England's Andy Hicks and Poland's Adam Stefanów, were invited to replace the absent professional players Jamie Burnett and Rouzi Maimaiti. Hicks and Stefanów were selected from the 2016 Q School Order of Merit, as the top-ranked players that had not already qualified for the tournament.

=== Rounds ===
The results of the three rounds of qualifying are given below. Of the 128 players that entered, 64 progressed to the second round; 32 players progressed to the third and final qualifying round. The 16 winners of the third round advanced to the main stages of the competition, where they met the 16 seeded players in the first round.

Round 1 Best of 19 frames		Round 2 Best of 19 frames		Round 3 Best of 19 frames
Mark Williams (WAL)	10
Zhao Xintong (CHN)	7	(Wales) Mark Williams	10
Liam Highfield (ENG)	10	(England) Liam Highfield	9
Andres Petrov (EST)	2			(Wales) Mark Williams	7
Stuart Carrington (ENG)	10			(England) Stuart Carrington	10
Alex Borg (MLT)	2	(England) Stuart Carrington	10
Andrew Higginson (ENG)	10	(England) Andrew Higginson	6
Michael Georgiou (CYP)	8
Tom Ford (ENG)	10
Jamie Bodle (ENG)	2	(England) Tom Ford	10
Chris Wakelin (ENG)	10	(England) Chris Wakelin	6
Elliot Slessor (ENG)	5			(England) Tom Ford	10
Matthew Selt (ENG)	10			(Iran) Hossein Vafaei	8
David John (WAL)	4	(England) Matthew Selt	6
Hossein Vafaei (IRI)	10	(Iran) Hossein Vafaei	10
Hatem Yassen (EGY)	1
Robin Hull (FIN)	8
Reanne Evans (ENG)	10	(England) Reanne Evans	6
Matthew Stevens (WAL)	8	(Wales) Lee Walker	10
Lee Walker (WAL)	10			(Wales) Lee Walker	8
Noppon Saengkham (THA)	10			(Thailand) Noppon Saengkham	10
Jak Jones (WAL)	5	(Thailand) Noppon Saengkham	10
Anthony Hamilton (ENG)	10	(England) Anthony Hamilton	9
Craig Steadman (ENG)	5
Li Hang (CHN)	10
Fraser Patrick (SCO)	9	(China) Li Hang	10
Mike Dunn (ENG)	10	(England) Mike Dunn	4
Andy Hicks (ENG)	6			(China) Li Hang	5
Nigel Bond (ENG)	10			(Scotland) Stephen Maguire	10
Ng On-yee (HKG)	1	(England) Nigel Bond	3
Stephen Maguire (SCO)	10	(Scotland) Stephen Maguire	10
Kritsanut Lertsattayathorn (THA)	7
Mark King (ENG)	10
Paul Davison (ENG)	4	(England) Mark King	10
Zhang Anda (CHN)	7	(China) Fang Xiongman	4
Fang Xiongman (CHN)	10			(England) Mark King	4
Xiao Guodong (CHN)	10			(China) Xiao Guodong	10
Tyler Rees (WAL)	2	(China) Xiao Guodong	10
Sam Baird (ENG)	10	(England) Sam Baird	4
Ross Vallance (SCO)	2
Ben Woollaston (ENG)	10
Chris Totten (SCO)	4	(England) Ben Woollaston	10
Ken Doherty (IRL)	10	(Republic of Ireland) Ken Doherty	4
Jason Weston (ENG)	4			(England) Ben Woollaston	9
Zhou Yuelong (CHN)	10			(China) Zhou Yuelong	10
Christopher Keogan (ENG)	5	(China) Zhou Yuelong	10
Ian Burns (ENG)	7	(Wales) Ian Preece	8
Ian Preece (WAL)	10
Alfie Burden (ENG)	10
Adam Duffy (ENG)	6	(England) Alfie Burden	8
Jamie Jones (WAL)	10	(Wales) Jamie Jones	10
Jamie Curtis-Barrett (ENG)	0			(Wales) Jamie Jones	8
Dechawat Poomjaeng (THA)	10			(Scotland) Graeme Dott	10
Chen Zhe (CHN)	7	(Thailand) Dechawat Poomjaeng	4
Graeme Dott (SCO)	10	(Scotland) Graeme Dott	10
Allan Taylor (ENG)	3
Tian Pengfei (CHN)	10
Zhang Yong (CHN)	4	(China) Tian Pengfei	9
Fergal O'Brien (IRL)	10	(Republic of Ireland) Fergal O'Brien	10
Gerard Greene (NIR)	6			(Republic of Ireland) Fergal O'Brien	10
Rhys Clark (SCO)	10			(England) David Gilbert	9
Wayne Townsend (ENG)	1	(Scotland) Rhys Clark	6
David Gilbert (ENG)	w/o	(England) David Gilbert	10
Patrick Wallace (NIR)	w/d
Joe Perry (ENG)	10
Zack Richardson (ENG)	3	(England) Joe Perry	9
Mei Xiwen (CHN)	5	(Thailand) Sunny Akani	10
Sunny Akani (THA)	10			(Thailand) Sunny Akani	3
Mark Joyce (ENG)	10			(England) David Grace	10
Jordan Brown (NIR)	3	(England) Mark Joyce	6
David Grace (ENG)	10	(England) David Grace	10
Thor Chuan Leong (MAS)	6
Luca Brecel (BEL)	10
Sean O'Sullivan (ENG)	4	(Belgium) Luca Brecel	10
Joe Swail (NIR)	10	(Northern Ireland) Joe Swail	8
Sanderson Lam (ENG)	8			(Belgium) Luca Brecel	10
Dominic Dale (WAL)	10			(Wales) Dominic Dale	5
Boonyarit Keattikun (THA)	2	(Wales) Dominic Dale	10
Daniel Wells (WAL)	10	(Wales) Daniel Wells	6
Adam Stefanów (POL)	7
Gary Wilson (ENG)	10
Josh Boileau (IRL)	9	(England) Gary Wilson	10
Thepchaiya Un-Nooh (THA)	9	(England) Peter Lines	7
Peter Lines (ENG)	10			(England) Gary Wilson	10
Ross Muir (SCO)	10			(Wales) Michael White	3
Gareth Allen (WAL)	7	(Scotland) Ross Muir	4
Michael White (WAL)	10	(Wales) Michael White	10
Aditya Mehta (IND)	3
Rory McLeod (ENG)	10
Darryl Hill (IOM)	7	(England) Rory McLeod	10
Kurt Maflin (NOR)	6	(England) Sydney Wilson	7
Sydney Wilson (ENG)	10			(England) Rory McLeod	10
Martin O'Donnell (ENG)	10			(England) Hammad Miah	7
Jackson Page (WAL)	9	(England) Martin O'Donnell	7
Ricky Walden (ENG)	7	(England) Hammad Miah	10
Hammad Miah (ENG)	10
Michael Holt (ENG)	10
Hamza Akbar (PAK)	2	(England) Michael Holt	10
Jamie Cope (ENG)	5	(Scotland) Eden Sharav	4
Eden Sharav (SCO)	10			(England) Michael Holt	9
Peter Ebdon (ENG)	10			(England) Peter Ebdon	10
Michael Wild (ENG)	3	(England) Peter Ebdon	10
Jack Lisowski (ENG)	10	(England) Jack Lisowski	9
Jimmy White (ENG)	7
Alan McManus (SCO)	10
Kurt Dunham (AUS)	1	(Scotland) Alan McManus	5
Rod Lawler (ENG)	10	(England) Rod Lawler	10
Xu Si (CHN)	5			(England) Rod Lawler	6
Jimmy Robertson (ENG)	10			(England) Jimmy Robertson	10
Cao Yupeng (CHN)	8	(England) Jimmy Robertson	10
Oliver Lines (ENG)	10	(England) Oliver Lines	4
Duane Jones (WAL)	6
Yan Bingtao (CHN)	10
Sam Craigie (ENG)	8	(China) Yan Bingtao	10
Mark Davis (ENG)	10	(England) Mark Davis	7
Mitchell Mann (ENG)	3			(China) Yan Bingtao	10
Scott Donaldson (SCO)	10			(Switzerland) Alexander Ursenbacher	4
Wang Yuchen (CHN)	2	(Scotland) Scott Donaldson	9
Robert Milkins (ENG)	6	(Switzerland) Alexander Ursenbacher	10
Alexander Ursenbacher (SUI)	10
Robbie Williams (ENG)	10
James Cahill (ENG)	1	(England) Robbie Williams	7
Yu Delu (CHN)	10	(China) Yu Delu	10
Itaro Santos (BRA)	0			(China) Yu Delu	7
John Astley (ENG)	10			(England) Martin Gould	10
Igor Figueiredo (BRA)	7	(England) John Astley	6
Martin Gould (ENG)	10	(England) Martin Gould	10
James Wattana (THA)	2

== Century breaks ==
=== Main stage centuries ===
There were 74 century breaks made by 23 players in the main stage of the event. Ronnie O'Sullivan compiled the highest break of the tournament, a 146, in his quarter-final loss to Ding Junhui.

- 146, 128, 124, 122, 111, 104 – Ronnie O'Sullivan
- 143, 139, 132, 131, 128, 121, 101, 100 – Mark Selby
- 141, 135, 129, 127, 124, 120, 120, 111 – John Higgins
- 139, 136, 132, 132, 128, 128, 120, 117, 117, 113, 111, 110, 103 – Ding Junhui
- 137, 122 – Stuart Bingham
- 135, 114 – Stephen Maguire
- 132, 126, 115 – Barry Hawkins
- 131 – Xiao Guodong
- 130 – Liang Wenbo
- 129, 116, 105, 102, 100, 100 – Mark Allen
- 125 – Ryan Day
- 124, 107, 101 – Stuart Carrington
- 118, 115, 109, 105 – Marco Fu
- 118, 112, 109 – Shaun Murphy
- 113, 105 – Neil Robertson
- 111, 104 – Ali Carter
- 110 – Kyren Wilson
- 109 – Luca Brecel
- 109 – Yan Bingtao
- 108, 100 – Martin Gould
- 105 – Graeme Dott
- 104 – David Grace
- 103, 100 – Gary Wilson

=== Qualifying stage centuries ===
There were 84 century breaks made by 51 players in the qualifying stages of the championship. The highest was a maximum break compiled by Gary Wilson in frame four of his first qualifying round win over Josh Boileau.

- 147, 130, 113, 109, 107, 102, 102, 101 – Gary Wilson
- 144, 104 – Michael White
- 140, 103 – Joe Perry
- 140 – Sam Craigie
- 137, 128, 111 – Xiao Guodong
- 137, 107, 103 – David Grace
- 137 – Jack Lisowski
- 136, 129, 108 – Martin Gould
- 135, 104 – Hossein Vafaei
- 135, 102 – Yu Delu
- 134, 122 – Noppon Saengkham
- 133, 105 – Jamie Jones
- 133 – Peter Lines
- 132 – Liam Highfield
- 131, 129, 104 – Stephen Maguire
- 131, 106 – Chris Wakelin
- 131 – Zhou Yuelong
- 130, 100 – Fergal O'Brien
- 129 – Ben Woollaston
- 128, 115, 100 – Mark Davis
- 127 – Anthony Hamilton
- 127 – Tian Pengfei
- 125, 109 – Sanderson Lam
- 123 – Paul Davison
- 122, 121, 120, 106 – Dominic Dale
- 122 – Jimmy White
- 120, 105 – Sunny Akani
- 119 – Peter Ebdon
- 118 – Robin Hull
- 117, 105 – Yan Bingtao
- 114 – Alexander Ursenbacher
- 112 – Mei Xiwen
- 112 – Mark Williams
- 111, 102 – Zhang Anda
- 108 – Ken Doherty
- 108 – Michael Wild
- 107 – Jamie Cope
- 107 – Li Hang
- 107 – Robert Milkins
- 106 – Jimmy Robertson
- 105 – Tom Ford
- 105 – David Gilbert
- 105 – Robbie Williams
- 104 – Stuart Carrington
- 103 – Michael Georgiou
- 103 – Alan McManus
- 102 – Nigel Bond
- 101, 101 – Michael Holt
- 101 – Kritsanut Lertsattayathorn
- 101 – Sydney Wilson
- 100 – Luca Brecel
