= 2017 Riga Masters =

Snooker tournament

Riga Masters
Tournament information
- Dates: 23–25 June 2017
- Venue: Arena Riga
- City: Riga
- Country: Latvia
- Organisation: World Snooker
- Format: Ranking event
- Total prize fund: £227,000
- Winner's share: £50,000
- Highest break: Andrew Higginson (ENG) (140)

Final
- Champion: Ryan Day (WAL)
- Runner-up: Stephen Maguire (SCO)
- Score: 5–2

The 2017 Kaspersky Riga Masters was a professional ranking snooker tournament that took place between 23 and 25 June 2017 at the Arena Riga in Riga, Latvia. It was the first ranking event of the 2017/2018 season. The tournament was broadcast by Eurosport.

Neil Robertson was the defending champion, but he lost in the first round to Lukas Kleckers.

Ryan Day claimed the first ranking title of his career by defeating Stephen Maguire 5–2 in the final.

== Prize fund ==
The breakdown of prize money for this year is shown below:

- Winner: £50,000
- Runner-up: £25,000
- Semi-final: £15,000
- Quarter-final: £6,000
- Last 16: £4,000
- Last 32: £2,000
- Last 64: £1,000
- Highest break: £2,000
- Total: £227,000

The "rolling 147 prize" for a maximum break stood at £10,000

== Main draw ==
Last 64; Best of 7 frames
(Thailand) Thepchaiya Un-Nooh	4
(Cyprus) Michael Georgiou	1
(England) Stuart Carrington	3
(Scotland) Anthony McGill	4
(Norway) Kurt Maflin	4
(Scotland) Alan McManus	3
(Scotland) Eden Sharav	3
(England) Jimmy White	4
(England) Gary Wilson	0
(Republic of Ireland) Ken Doherty	4
(Finland) Robin Hull	4
(Latvia) Rodion Judin	2
(Malta) Alex Borg	1
(China) Zhang Anda	4
(England) Hammad Miah	4
(England) Tom Ford	0
(England) Jimmy Robertson	w/d
(England) John Astley	w/o
(England) Jamie Curtis-Barrett	0
(England) Andrew Higginson	4
(England) Stuart Bingham	0
(England) Mark Davis	4
(England) Sam Craigie	4
(Wales) Jamie Jones	3
(Wales) Matthew Stevens	1
(England) Jack Lisowski	4
(Australia) Neil Robertson	3
(Germany) Lukas Kleckers	4
(England) Oliver Lines	4
(England) Christopher Keogan	1
(Scotland) Stephen Maguire	4
(Northern Ireland) Gerard Greene	0
(Iran) Hossein Vafaei	w/o
(England) Mark King	w/d
(England) Paul Davison	4
(China) Zhou Yuelong	2
(England) David Gilbert	3
(England) Joe Perry	4
(China) Tian Pengfei	4
(Wales) Ben Jones	1
(China) Wang Yuchen	w/d
(England) Robert Milkins	w/o
(England) Barry Hawkins	3
(Wales) Ryan Day	4
(England) Craig Steadman	w/o
(China) Chen Zifan	w/d
(England) Ben Woollaston	2
(England) Kyren Wilson	4
(England) Nigel Bond	4
(Wales) Jackson Page	1
(China) Xiao Guodong	1
(England) Mark Joyce	4
(Thailand) Noppon Saengkham	4
(China) Cao Yupeng	2
(England) Sam Baird	4
(Wales) Michael White	0
(Switzerland) Alexander Ursenbacher	4
(England) Elliot Slessor	0
(England) Robbie Williams	4
(England) Ashley Carty	0
(Wales) Mark Williams	4
(England) Peter Ebdon	1
(Belgium) Luca Brecel	4
(Wales) Lee Walker	3

Last 32; Best of 7 frames
(Thailand) Thepchaiya Un-Nooh	3
(Scotland) Anthony McGill	4
(Norway) Kurt Maflin	2
(England) Jimmy White	4
(Republic of Ireland) Ken Doherty	4
(Finland) Robin Hull	2
(China) Zhang Anda	4
(England) Hammad Miah	3
(England) John Astley	1
(England) Andrew Higginson	4
(England) Mark Davis	4
(England) Sam Craigie	2
(England) Jack Lisowski	4
(Germany) Lukas Kleckers	2
(England) Oliver Lines	3
(Scotland) Stephen Maguire	4
(Iran) Hossein Vafaei	0
(England) Paul Davison	4
(England) Joe Perry	4
(China) Tian Pengfei	0
(England) Robert Milkins	1
(Wales) Ryan Day	4
(England) Craig Steadman	3
(England) Kyren Wilson	4
(England) Nigel Bond	2
(England) Mark Joyce	4
(Thailand) Noppon Saengkham	2
(England) Sam Baird	4
(Switzerland) Alexander Ursenbacher	2
(England) Robbie Williams	4
(Wales) Mark Williams	4
(Belgium) Luca Brecel	1

Last 16; Best of 7 frames
(Scotland) Anthony McGill	4
(England) Jimmy White	1
(Republic of Ireland) Ken Doherty	4
(China) Zhang Anda	2
(England) Andrew Higginson	4
(England) Mark Davis	3
(England) Jack Lisowski	0
(Scotland) Stephen Maguire	4
(England) Paul Davison	1
(England) Joe Perry	4
(Wales) Ryan Day	4
(England) Kyren Wilson	3
(England) Mark Joyce	4
(England) Sam Baird	2
(England) Robbie Williams	2
(Wales) Mark Williams	4

Quarter-finals; Best of 7 frames
(Scotland) Anthony McGill	2
(Republic of Ireland) Ken Doherty	4
(England) Andrew Higginson	3
(Scotland) Stephen Maguire	4
(England) Joe Perry	0
(Wales) Ryan Day	4
(England) Mark Joyce	1
(Wales) Mark Williams	4

Semi-finals; Best of 9 frames
(Republic of Ireland) Ken Doherty	4
(Scotland) Stephen Maguire	5
(Wales) Ryan Day	5
(Wales) Mark Williams	4

Final; Best of 9 frames
(Scotland) Stephen Maguire	2
(Wales) Ryan Day	5

== Final ==
Final: Best of 9 frames. Referee: Ben Williams. Arena Riga, Riga, Latvia, 25 June 2017.
Stephen Maguire; Scotland	2–5	Ryan Day; Wales
33–78 (59), 50–76, 0–77 (77), 46–74, 123–11 (119), 77–0, 41–75 (58)
119	Highest break	77
1	Century breaks	0
1	50+ breaks	3

== Qualifying ==
These matches were played between 31 May and 2 June 2017 at the Preston Guild Hall in Preston, England. All matches were best of 7 frames.

(Wales) Ian Preece	3–4	(Thailand) Thepchaiya Un-Nooh
(Cyprus) Michael Georgiou	4–1	(England) Sanderson Lam
(England) Ashley Hugill	0–4	(England) Stuart Carrington
(Scotland) Anthony McGill	4–0 (Note: Match held over and played in Riga.)	(Latvia) Tatjana Vasiljeva (Note: Wildcard)
(England) Martin Gould	3–4	(Norway) Kurt Maflin
(England) William Lemons	1–4	(Scotland) Alan McManus
(Malaysia) Thor Chuan Leong	3–4	(Scotland) Eden Sharav
(England) Jimmy White	4–3	(Wales) Jak Jones
(England) Gary Wilson	4–2	(China) Hu Hao
(Republic of Ireland) Ken Doherty	4–2	(England) Peter Lines
(Republic of Ireland) Josh Boileau	0–4	(Finland) Robin Hull
(Latvia) Rodion Judin	4–0	(China) Chen Zhe
(Malta) Alex Borg	w/o–w/d	(England) Mark Selby
(China) Zhang Anda	4–2	(England) Allan Taylor
(England) Liam Highfield	w/d–w/o	(England) Hammad Miah
(England) Tom Ford	4–2	(Pakistan) Hamza Akbar
(England) Jimmy Robertson	4–2	(England) Martin O'Donnell
(Northern Ireland) Declan Brennan	3–4	(England) John Astley
(Wales) Duane Jones	3–4	(England) Jamie Curtis-Barrett
(China) Yan Bingtao	2–4	(England) Andrew Higginson
(England) Stuart Bingham	4–1	(China) Li Hang
(China) Zhao Xintong	0–4	(England) Mark Davis
(England) Sam Craigie	4–3	(Iran) Soheil Vahedi
(Wales) Jamie Jones	4–2	(Republic of Ireland) Fergal O'Brien
(England) Chris Wakelin	3–4	(Wales) Matthew Stevens
(England) Jack Lisowski	4–3	(Northern Ireland) Mark Allen
(England) Daniel Ward	2–4	(Australia) Neil Robertson
(Germany) Lukas Kleckers	w/o–w/d	(China) Li Yuan
(England) Oliver Lines	4–3	(China) Yuan Sijun
(England) Sean O'Sullivan	3–4	(England) Christopher Keogan
(Scotland) Stephen Maguire	4–0	(England) Ian Burns
(Northern Ireland) Gerard Greene	4–1	(China) Zhang Yong

(England) Anthony Hamilton	3–4	(Iran) Hossein Vafaei
(Scotland) Chris Totten	0–4	(England) Mark King
(England) Paul Davison	w/o–w/d	(China) Niu Zhuang
(China) Zhou Yuelong	4–0	(Australia) Kurt Dunham
(England) Charlie Walters	w/d–w/o	(England) David Gilbert
(Scotland) Graeme Dott	3–4	(England) Joe Perry
(China) Tian Pengfei	4–2	(Scotland) Scott Donaldson
(Wales) Ben Jones	4–1	(England) Mike Dunn
(China) Wang Yuchen	w/o–w/d	(England) Rod Lawler
(England) Robert Milkins	4–1	(India) Aditya Mehta
(England) Barry Hawkins	4–2	(England) Michael Holt
(Wales) David John	1–4	(Wales) Ryan Day
(England) Craig Steadman	4–1	(China) Lyu Haotian
(China) Chen Zifan	4–2	(Scotland) Ross Muir
(England) Mitchell Mann	1–4	(England) Ben Woollaston
(England) Alfie Burden	0–4	(England) Kyren Wilson
(England) Nigel Bond	4–1	(Wales) Dominic Dale
(England) James Silverwood	1–4	(Wales) Jackson Page
(England) Rory McLeod	0–4	(China) Xiao Guodong
(England) Mark Joyce	4–1	(China) Fang Xiongman
(England) Adam Duffy	1–4	(Thailand) Noppon Saengkham
(England) Ricky Walden	0–4	(China) Cao Yupeng
(England) Matthew Selt	3–4	(England) Sam Baird
(Wales) Michael White	4–1	(Scotland) Rhys Clark
(England) Billy Joe Castle	0–4	(Switzerland) Alexander Ursenbacher
(England) Elliot Slessor	4–0	(Wales) Jamie Clarke
(England) Robbie Williams	4–2	(China) Xu Si
(England) David Grace	1–4	(England) Ashley Carty
(Wales) Mark Williams	w/o–w/d	(China) Yu Delu
(Wales) Daniel Wells	0–4	(England) Peter Ebdon
(England) Shaun Murphy	2–4	(Belgium) Luca Brecel
(Wales) Lee Walker	4–1	(China) Mei Xiwen

== Century breaks ==
=== Main stage centuries ===
Total: 24

- 140 – Andrew Higginson
- 139, 119, 112 – Stephen Maguire
- 139 – Alexander Ursenbacher
- 137, 109 – Neil Robertson
- 135 – Robin Hull
- 134 – Mark Davis
- 130 – Mark Williams
- 129 – Joe Perry
- 129 – Eden Sharav
- 129 – Robbie Williams
- 126 – Ken Doherty
- 119, 100 – Ryan Day
- 119 – Barry Hawkins
- 113 – Zhang Anda
- 112 – Kurt Maflin
- 112 – Tian Pengfei
- 107 – Mark Joyce
- 102 – Stuart Carrington
- 102 – Jack Lisowski
- 102 – Kyren Wilson

=== Qualifying stage centuries ===
Total: 14

- 132, 127 – Xiao Guodong
- 132, 109 – Jimmy Robertson
- 127 – Kurt Maflin
- 124 – Matthew Selt
- 124 – Zhang Anda
- 123 – Ben Woollaston
- 121 – Declan Brennan
- 116 – Thepchaiya Un-Nooh
- 115 – Gary Wilson
- 104 – Graeme Dott
- 102 – Peter Ebdon
- 101 – Craig Steadman
