= 2016 IBSF World Under-21 Snooker Championship =

IBSF World Under-21 Snooker Championship
Tournament information
- Dates: 20–25 August 2016
- City: Mol
- Country: Belgium
- Organisation: IBSF
- Highest break: (China) Xu Si (135)

Final
- Champion: (China) Xu Si
- Runner-up: (Switzerland) Alexander Ursenbacher
- Score: 6–5

The 2016 IBSF World Under-21 Snooker Championship was an amateur snooker tournament that took place from 20 August to 25 August 2016 in Mol, Belgium. It was the 28th edition of the IBSF World Under-21 Snooker Championship and also doubles as a qualification event for the World Snooker Tour.

The tournament was won by 25th seed Xu Si who defeated former world number 102 Alexander Ursenbacher 6–5 in the final. As a result, Xu Si was given a two-year card on the professional World Snooker Tour for the 2017/2018 and 2018/2019 seasons.

== Results ==
=== Round 1 ===
Best of 7 frames

65	(New Zealand) Pravil Kant	2–4	64	(Hong Kong) Man Hoi Leong
57	(Albania) Eklent Kaçi	2–4	72	(Sweden) Belan Sharif
69	(Wales) Ryan Rowlands	4–0	60	(Wales) Rhys Thomas
61	(Latvia) Rodion Judin	4–1	68	(Belgium) Ben Mertens

67	(England) Louis Heathcote	4–0	62	(Poland) Karol Lelek
59	(Australia) Cale Barrett	4–0	70	(Australia) Alex Pace
71	(Brazil) Gabriel Martins Campos	0–4	46	(Hong Kong) Ming Wa Man
63	(Hong Kong) Ka Wai Cheung	4–2	66	(Belgium) Amedeo Durnez

=== Round 2 ===
Best of 7 frames

1	(Thailand) Ratchayothin Yotharuck	4–1	64	(Hong Kong) Leong Man-hoi
33	(Belgium) Jeff Jacobs	4–3	32	(Poland) Paweł Rogoza
17	(Scotland) Dylan Craig	4–0	48	(Australia) Ben Foster
49	(England) Richard Haney	4–3	16	(England) Ashley Carty
9	(Poland) Kacper Filipiak	4–0	56	(Switzerland) Dennis Furrer
41	(France) Alexis Callewaert	2–4	24	(England) Peter Devlin
25	(China) Xu Si	4–0	40	(Hong Kong) Yun Fung Tam
72	(Sweden) Belan Sharif	1–4	8	(England) Joe O'Connor
5	(China) Yuan Sijun	4–0	69	(Wales) Ryan Rowlands
37	(Germany) Michael Schnabel	4–2	28	(Republic of Ireland) Charlie Sweeney
21	(Republic of Ireland) Adam Fitzgerald	4–1	44	(France) Niel Vincent
53	(Wales) Ben Fortey	4–2	12	(Germany) Simon Lichtenberg
13	(Germany) Lukas Kleckers	4–2	52	(India) Digvijay Kadian
45	(Poland) Daniel Holoyda	0–4	20	(Wales) Dylan Emery
29	(Russia) Ivan Kakovsky	4–3	36	(South Korea) Daegyu Lee
61	(Latvia) Rodion Judin	1–4	4	(Estonia) Andres Petrov

3	(Iran) Siyavosh Mozayani	0–4	67	(England) Louis Heathcote
35	(India) Asutosh Padhy	4–3	30	(Austria) Florian Nüßle
19	(India) Ishpreet Singh Chadha	4–0	46	(Romania) Andrei Orzan
51	(France) Yannick Tarillon	4–0	14	(Germany) Umut Dikme
11	(Israel) Amir Nardeia	0–4	54	(England) Nico Elton
43	(Bulgaria) Spasian Spasov	1–4	22	(France) Brian Ochoiski
27	(Poland) Mateusz Baranowski	4–2	38	(New Zealand) Louis Chand
59	(Australia) Cale Barrett	1–4	6	(Switzerland) Alexander Ursenbacher
7	(Wales) Tyler Rees	4–2	58	(Hong Kong) Ming Wa Man
39	(Hong Kong) Ming Tung Chan	2–4	26	(India) Shrikrishna Suryanarayanan
23	(Thailand) Phuttakarn Kimsuk	3–4	42	(Japan) Keishin Kamihashi
55	(Austria) Markus Pfistermüller	3–4	10	(Scotland) Chris Totten
15	(Wales) Jackson Page	4–2	50	(Thailand) Narongdat Takantong
47	(Finland) Patrik Tiihonen	4–2	18	(Republic of Ireland) Noel Landers
31	(Republic of Ireland) Shane Bates	0–4	34	(Malta) Chris Peplow
63	(Hong Kong) Cheung Ka-wai	4–1	2	(Malta) Brian Cini

Round 2 Best of 9 frames
1	(Thailand) R. Yotharuck	5
33	(Belgium) J. Jacobs	3
17	(Scotland) D. Craig	3
49	(England) R. Haney	5
9	(Poland) K. Filipiak	5
24	(England) P. Devlin	3
25	(China) Xu S.	5
8	(England) J. O'Connor	2
5	(China) Yuan S.	5
37	(Germany) M. Schnabel	1
21	(Republic of Ireland) A. Fitzgerald	1
53	(Wales) B. Fortey	5
13	(Germany) L. Kleckers	5
20	(Wales) D. Emery	4
29	(Russia) I. Kakovsky	2
4	(Estonia) A. Petrov	5
67	(England) L. Heathcote	1
35	(India) A. Padhy	5
19	(India) I.S. Chadha	5
51	(France) Y. Tarillon	4
54	(England) N. Elton	5
22	(France) B. Ochoiski	0
27	(Poland) M. Baranowski	4
6	(Switzerland) A. Ursenbacher	5
7	(Wales) T. Rees	5
26	(India) S. Suryanarayanan	2
42	(Japan) K. Kamihashi	2
10	(Scotland) C. Totten	5
15	(Wales) J. Page	4
47	(Finland) P. Tiihonen	5
34	(Malta) C. Peplow	4
63	(Hong Kong) Cheung K.W.	5

Round 3 Best of 9 frames
1	(Thailand) R. Yotharuck	4
49	(England) R. Haney	5
9	(Poland) K. Filipiak	3
25	(China) Xu	5
5	(China) Yuan	5
53	(Wales) B. Fortey	0
13	(Germany) L. Kleckers	5
4	(Estonia) A. Petrov	2
35	(India) A. Padhy	5
19	(India) I.S. Chadha	2
54	(England) N. Elton	1
6	(Switzerland) A. Ursenbacher	5
7	(Wales) T. Rees	2
10	(Scotland) C. Totten	5
47	(Finland) P. Tiihonen	1
63	(Hong Kong) Cheung	5

Quarter-Finals; Best of 9 frames
49	(England) R. Haney	1
25	(China) Xu	5
5	(China) Yuan	4
13	(Germany) L. Kleckers	5
35	(India) A. Padhy	3
6	(Switzerland) A. Ursenbacher	5
10	(Scotland) C. Totten	2
63	(Hong Kong) Cheung	5

Semi-Finals; Best of 9 frames
25	(China) Xu	5
13	(Germany) L. Kleckers	2
6	(Switzerland) A. Ursenbacher	5
63	(Hong Kong) Cheung	3

Final; Best of 11 frames
25	(China) Xu Si	6
6	(Switzerland) A. Ursenbacher	5
