= Alexander Ursenbacher =

Swiss snooker player

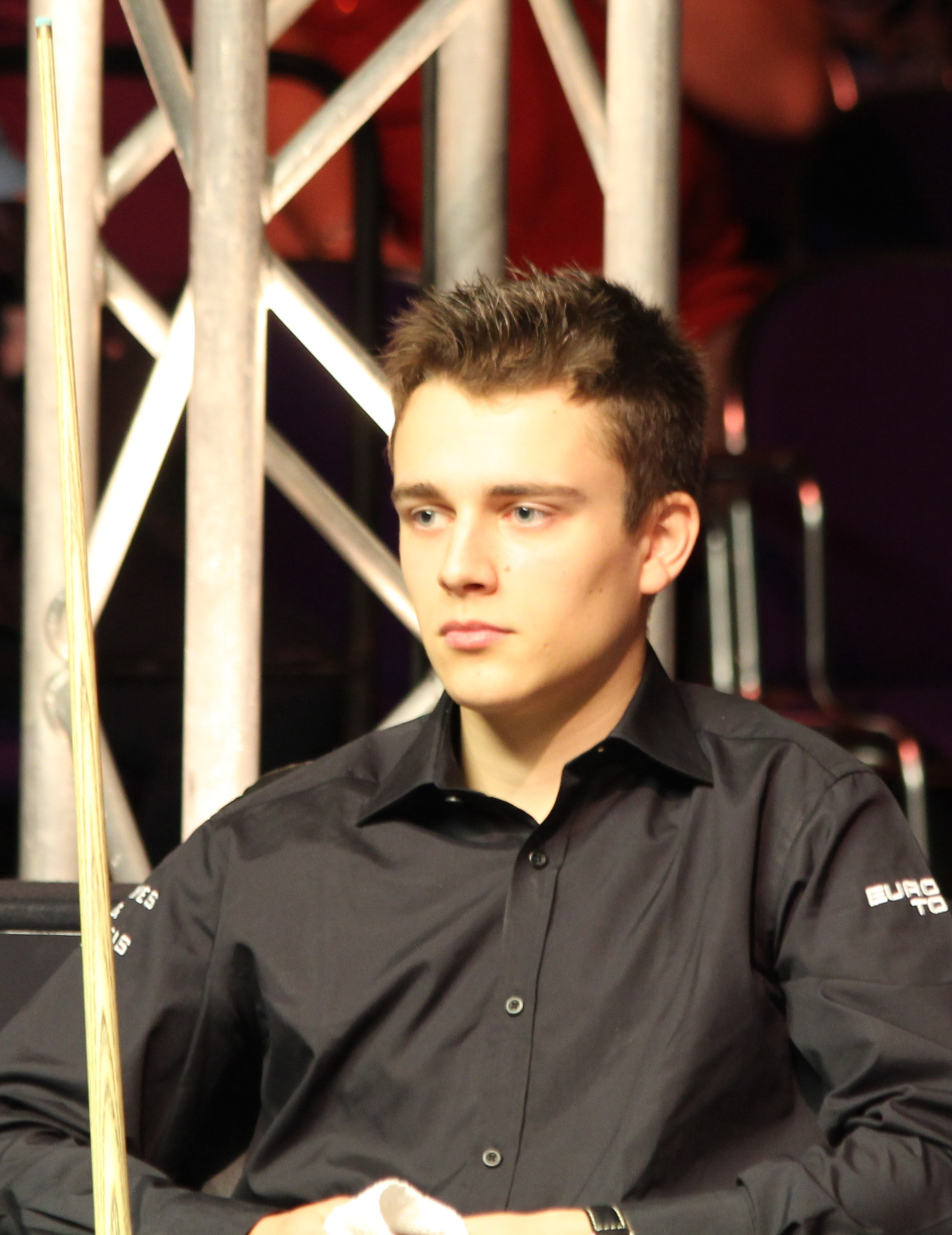
- Paul Hunter Classic 2014

Personal information
- Born: 26 April 1996 (age 30) Rheinfelden, Aargau

Sport
- Country: Switzerland
- Sport: Snooker
- Professional: 2013–2015, 2017–present
- Highest ranking: 41 (October 2021)
- Current ranking: 100 (as of 4 October 2026)
- Best ranking finish: Semi-final (2017 English Open)

Alexander Ursenbacher (born 26 April 1996) is a Swiss professional snooker player from Rheinfelden. He is the first snooker player from Switzerland to have competed professionally (former professional Darren Paris represented England, in the mid-1990s, before moving to Switzerland).

Having qualified for the main tour through the 2013 Q School, where he defeated Paul Wykes in his quarter-final match, Ursenbacher lost his professional status upon the expiry of his two-year tour card in 2015, but regained it two years later after defeating Jackson Page 6–4 in the final of the 2017 EBSA European Under-21 Snooker Championship. He lost his tour card again when he ended the 2022–23 season at 86th place in the snooker world rankings. However, he managed to immediately regain his professional status by prevailing in the first Q School Event of 2023.

== Career ==
Ursenbacher started playing snooker in 2008. He has won a host of junior titles in his native Switzerland and has won the national championship twice, due in large part to his stays at Snooker Academies in Sheffield and Gloucester and individual training by former World Championship semi-finalist Ian McCulloch.

He turned professional by coming through the 2013 Q School. After an early defeat in Event One, he played superbly throughout Event Two, losing just one frame in four matches and scoring a top break of 140. He beat nine-time Ladies' World Champion Reanne Evans 4–1, then in the final round he saw off experienced former pro Paul Wykes 4–0.

Ursenbacher experienced a tough start to his debut season as a professional, losing his first seven matches. His first win came in November at the minor-ranking Kay Suzanne Memorial Cup against former world champion Ken Doherty, and he was close to following it with another defeat of a world champion in the form of Peter Ebdon in the next round, ultimately losing 4–3. He failed to win another match until the season-ending World Championship, where he came back from 6–2 down to win 10–7 against David Morris. He lost in the next round 10–5 to Thepchaiya Un-Nooh.

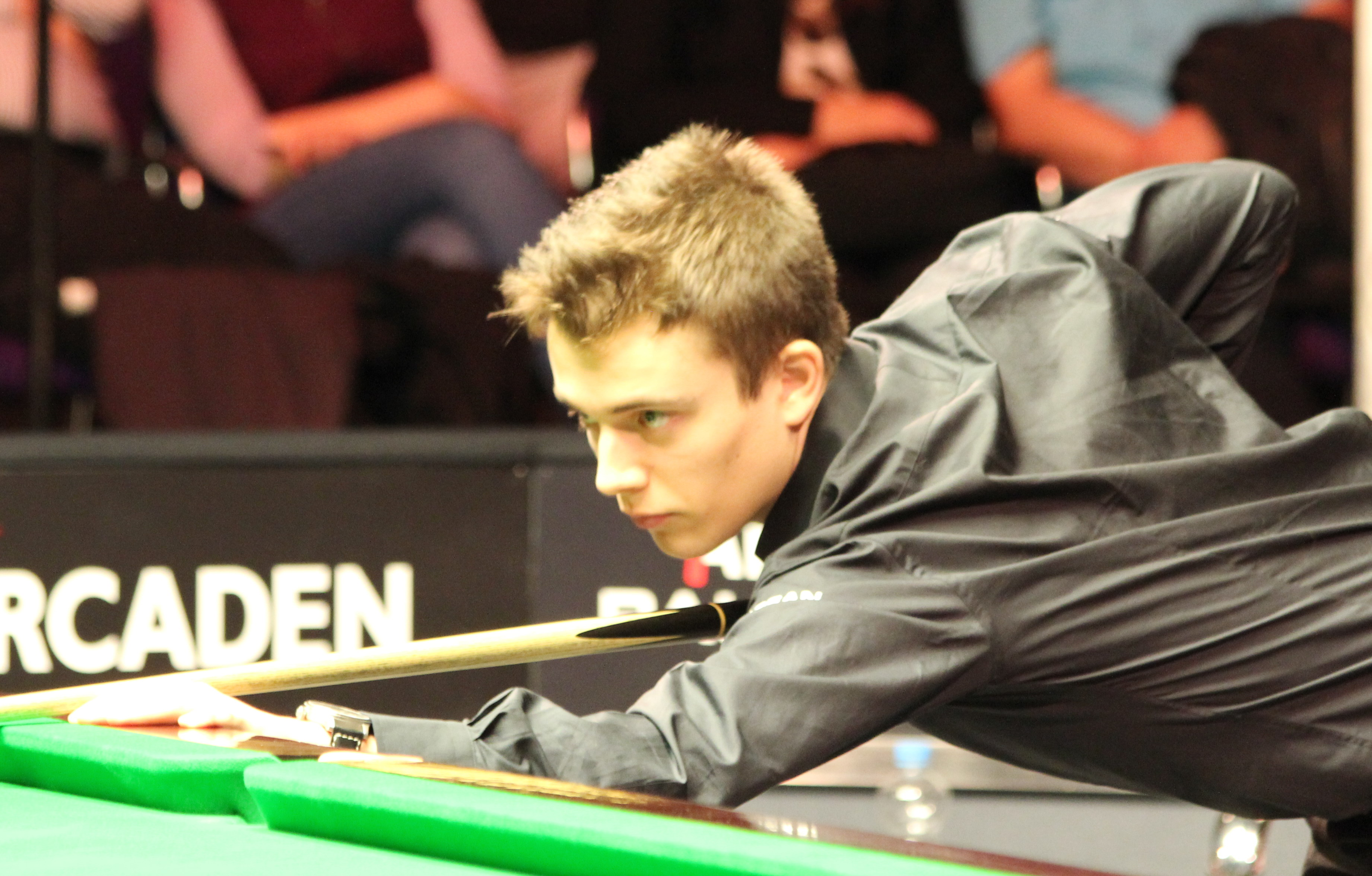
2014 Paul Hunter Classic

Ursenbacher qualified for the first ranking event of the 2014–15 season, the 2014 Wuxi Classic, by beating Kyren Wilson 5–4, but had to withdraw from the tournament due to being unable to enter China because of a visa problem. He defeated Martin O'Donnell 5–4 in the first round of qualifying for the Australian Goldfields Open, before losing 5–2 to Lyu Haotian and then lost a further 14 consecutive matches to be relegated from the tour as the world number 119. Ursenbacher won five games in the first event of the 2015 Q School to reach the final round where he lost 4–1 to Daniel Wells. In the second event he was eliminated in the last 32 by Joe Roberts.

Out of the three European Tour events Ursenbacher entered in the 2015–16 season, he reached the first round of the Ruhr Open, where he lost 4–3 to Rod Lawler. He was knocked out in the opening round of the first 2016 Q School event, but in the second event he won five matches to stand just a game away from rejoining the professional tour. Ursenbacher lost it 4–2 against Alex Borg.

In March 2017 he won the EBSA European Under-21 Snooker Championship in Nicosia and with it re-qualified for the Main Tour. The victory also allowed Ursenbacher to get an invitation to the World Championship qualifying rounds; he defeated Robert Milkins 10–6 and Scott Donaldson 10–9 to reach the final round (he was the only amateur present at this stage), where he lost 10–4 to Yan Bingtao.

Ursenbacher recorded his best result to date by reaching the semi-finals of the 2017 English Open, defeating former world champion Shaun Murphy along the way; he lost 3–6 to Kyren Wilson. Ursenbacher's form declined after that, however, and he failed to win a single match for the rest of the season, aside from non-ranking event Shoot Out. The next season was hardly an improvement, although Ursenbacher caused a major upset at the 2019 Welsh Open by knocking out tournament favourite Ronnie O'Sullivan in the third round; he lost his next match to Zhao Xintong. After losing his first round qualifying match for the World Championship 4–10 to Jordan Brown, Ursenbacher was left 69th in the season-end rankings, confirming his relegation.

Ursenbacher came through the third event of the 2019 Q School by winning six matches to earn another two-year card on the World Snooker Tour for the 2019–20 and 2020–21 seasons.

In July 2020, he became the first Swiss player to qualify for the main draw World Championships. Ursenbacher was beaten in the first round 10–2 by 15th seed Barry Hawkins.

== Performance and rankings timeline ==
Tournament	2013/ 14	2014/ 15	2015/ 16	2016/ 17	2017/ 18	2018/ 19	2019/ 20	2020/ 21	2021/ 22	2022/ 23	2023/ 24	2024/ 25	2025/ 26	2026/ 27
Ranking (Note: It shows the ranking at the beginning of the season)	(Note: New players on the Main Tour don't have a ranking)	120	(Note: He was an amateur)			69	(Note: Players qualified through Q School started the season without ranking points)	66	45	62		85		89
Ranking tournaments
Championship League	Non-Ranking Event							2R	2R	RR	RR	2R	RR	RR
China Open	LQ	LQ	A	A	LQ	1R	Tournament Not Held							LQ
Wuhan Open	Tournament Not Held										LQ	LQ	LQ	LQ
British Open	Tournament Not Held								1R	1R	LQ	LQ	LQ	LQ
English Open	Not Held			A	SF	2R	1R	3R	1R	LQ	LQ	LQ	LQ	LQ
Shenzhen Open (Note: The event was called the Xi'an Grand Prix (2024/2025–2025/2026))	Tournament Not Held											LQ	LQ	LQ
Northern Ireland Open	Not Held			A	1R	2R	QF	2R	LQ	1R	LQ	1R	LQ	LQ
International Championship	LQ	LQ	A	A	LQ	LQ	LQ	Not Held			LQ	LQ	LQ	LQ
UK Championship	1R	1R	A	A	1R	1R	1R	3R	2R	LQ	LQ	LQ	WD	
Shoot Out	Non-Ranking Event			A	2R	1R	2R	3R	A	3R	3R	1R	WD	
Scottish Open	Not Held			A	1R	1R	2R	1R	LQ	LQ	1R	1R	LQ	LQ
German Masters	LQ	LQ	A	A	LQ	LQ	1R	LQ	LQ	LQ	1R	3R	LQ	
Welsh Open	1R	1R	A	A	1R	4R	2R	3R	LQ	LQ	LQ	WD	1R	
World Grand Prix	NH	NR	DNQ	DNQ	DNQ	DNQ	DNQ	DNQ	DNQ	DNQ	DNQ	DNQ	DNQ	
Players Championship (Note: The event was called the Players Tour Championship Grand Final (2013/2014–2015/2016))	DNQ	DNQ	DNQ	DNQ	DNQ	DNQ	DNQ	DNQ	DNQ	DNQ	DNQ	DNQ	DNQ	
World Open	LQ	Not Held		A	1R	1R	LQ	Not Held			LQ	LQ	LQ	
Tour Championship	Tournament Not Held					DNQ	DNQ	DNQ	DNQ	DNQ	DNQ	DNQ	DNQ	
World Championship	LQ	LQ	A	LQ	LQ	LQ	1R	LQ	LQ	LQ	LQ	LQ	WD	
Former ranking tournaments
Australian Goldfields Open	A	LQ	A	Tournament Not Held										
Shanghai Masters	A	LQ	A	A	LQ	Non-Ranking		Not Held			Non-Ranking Event			
Paul Hunter Classic	Minor-Ranking			A	2R	2R	NR	Tournament Not Held						
Indian Open	LQ	LQ	NH	A	2R	WD	Tournament Not Held							
Riga Masters (Note: The event was called the Riga Open (2014/2015–2015/2016))	NH	MR		A	2R	LQ	1R	Tournament Not Held						
China Championship	Not Held			NR	LQ	1R	1R	Tournament Not Held						
WST Pro Series	Tournament Not Held							RR	Tournament Not Held					
Turkish Masters	Tournament Not Held								1R	Tournament Not Held				
Gibraltar Open	Not Held		MR	A	A	A	A	4R	WD	Tournament Not Held				
WST Classic	Tournament Not Held									1R	Tournament Not Held			
European Masters	Not Held			A	1R	1R	LQ	1R	LQ	LQ	LQ	Not Held		
Saudi Arabia Masters	Tournament Not Held											2R	2R	NH
Non-ranking tournaments
Six-red World Championship	A	A	A	A	A	A	A	Not Held		LQ	Tournament Not Held			

Performance Table Legend
LQ	lost in the qualifying draw	#R	lost in the early rounds of the tournament (WR = Wildcard round, RR = Round robin)	QF	lost in the quarter-finals
SF	lost in the semi–finals	F	lost in the final	W	won the tournament
DNQ	did not qualify for the tournament	A	did not participate in the tournament	WD	withdrew from the tournament

NH / Not Held	means an event was not held.
NR / Non-Ranking Event	means an event is/was no longer a ranking event.
R / Ranking Event	means an event is/was a ranking event.
MR / Minor-Ranking Event	means an event is/was a minor-ranking event.

== Career finals ==
=== Pro-am finals: 7 (4 titles) ===
Outcome	No.	Year	Championship	Opponent in the final	Score
Winner	1.	2017	3 Kings Open	(Belgium) Bjorn Haneveer	5–1
Runner-up	1.	2017	Italian Snooker Open	(England) Martin O'Donnell	2–3
Winner	2.	2019	Italian Snooker Open	(England) Rob James	3–0
Runner-up	2.	2020	3 Kings Open	(Belgium) Luca Brecel	2–5
Winner	3.	2024	3 Kings Open (2)	(Germany) Luca Kaufmann	3–0
Winner	4.	2024	Vienna Snooker Open	(England) Craig Steadman	5–4
Runner-up	3.	2025	3 Kings Open (2)	(Germany) Richard Wienold	1–3

=== Amateur finals: 4 (3 titles) ===
Outcome	No.	Year	Championship	Opponent in the final	Score
Winner	1.	2012	Swiss Amateur Championship	(Switzerland) Murat Ayas	5–1
Winner	2.	2013	Swiss Amateur Championship (2)	(Switzerland) Tom Zimmermann	5–2
Runner-up	1.	2016	World Under-21 Snooker Championship	(China) Xu Si	5–6
Winner	3.	2017	European Under-21 Snooker Championship	(Wales) Jackson Page	6–4

== Personal life ==
Ursenbacher is the son of a Portuguese mother from Madeira Island, living in Switzerland.
