= Xu Si =

Chinese snooker player (born 1998)

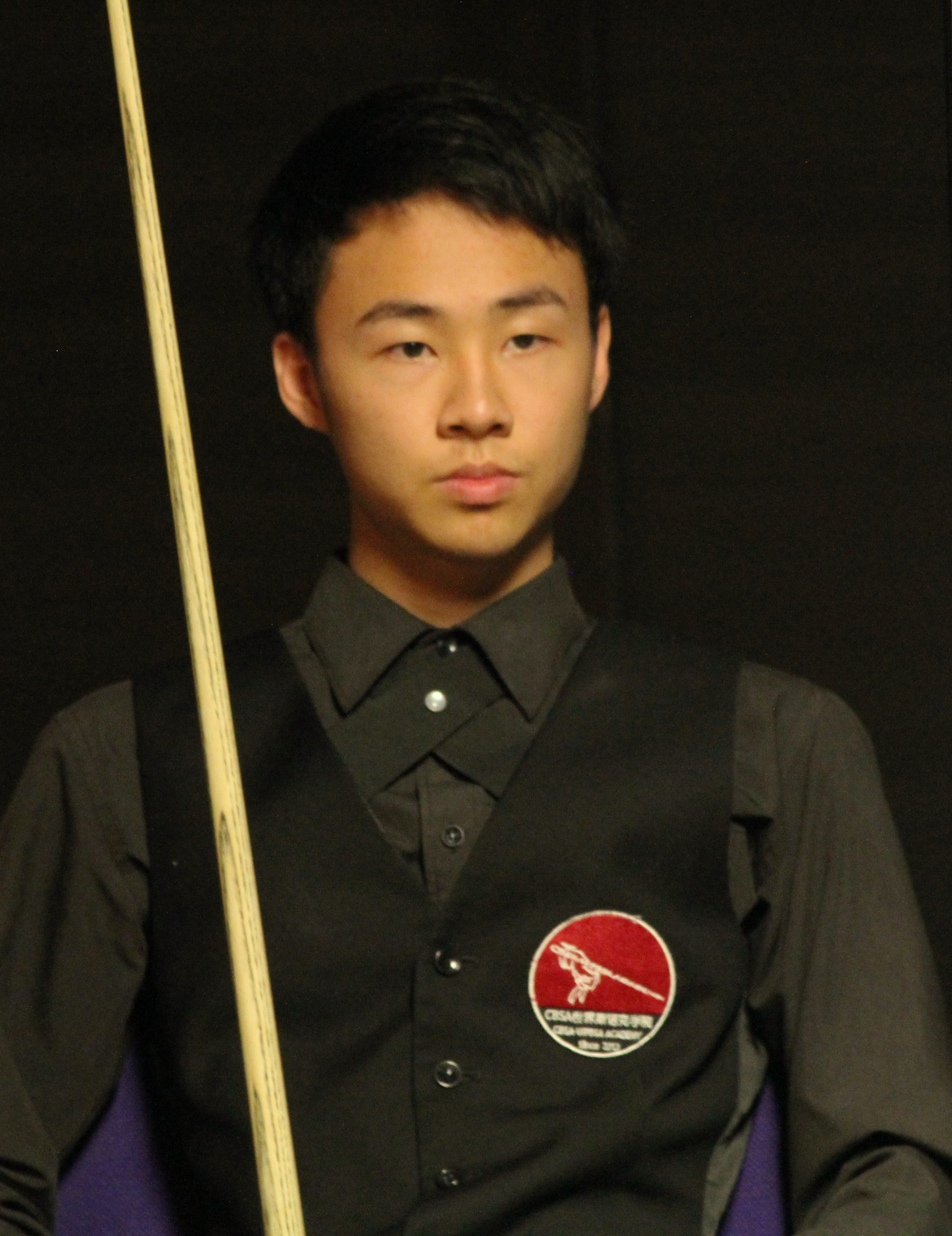
- Xu at the 2017 Paul Hunter Classic

Personal information
- Born: 24 January 1998 (age 28) Jieyang, Guangdong, China

Sport
- Country: China
- Sport: Snooker
- Professional: 2017–present
- Highest ranking: 34 (May 2026)
- Current ranking: 46 (as of 7 November 2026)
- Maximum breaks: 3
- Best ranking finish: Semi-final (x2)

Xu Si (Chinese: 徐思; born 24 January 1998) is a Chinese professional snooker player.

== Career ==
Xu Si first started playing snooker aged 12 at his local club in Jieyang during the school holidays. After a few weeks he became determined to become a snooker player.

Prior to turning professional, Xu began playing in minor-ranking Asian Players Tour Championship from age 15, and his first appearance at a ranking event was in the wildcard round of the 2014 Shanghai Masters where he was whitewashed 5–0 by Ryan Day. He also made a wildcard appearance at the 2016 World Open where he defeated veteran James Wattana 5-3 or progress to the last 64, where he lost in the next round against Daniel Wells. He made a further appearance at the 2016 Shanghai Masters wildcard round where he lost 5–1 to Michael Holt. He then won two matches at the 2016 International Championship, defeating professionals Wang Yuchen at the wildcard stage, and two-time world champion Mark Williams in the last 64 before losing to Wattana in the last 32. He lost out in the first round of qualifying for the 2017 World Snooker Championship, losing 10–5 to Rod Lawler.

In August 2016 Xu won the 2016 IBSF World Under-21 Snooker Championship by defeating Alexander Ursenbacher 6–5 after being 5–3 down. This victory earned him a two-year World Snooker Tour card.

=== 2017/2018 season ===
Xu's first professional match was in qualifying for the Riga Masters where he lost 4–2 to Robbie Williams. However, in only his third tournament, the 2017 Indian Open, he beat Michael Georgiou, Robin Hull, Sean O'Sullivan, Ricky Walden and Dave Gilbert to reach the semi-final, where he lost to John Higgins 4–2.

Xu reached the 2nd round of the UK Championship beating Mark Davis 6–5, and also reached the 4th round of the Scottish Open and 3rd round of the Welsh Open. In the World Championship, he lost the first match to Chris Wakelin 10–4. Xu finished the season ranked 91, but was awarded the title 'Rookie of the Year'.

=== 2018/2019 season ===
Xu's second season saw a loss of form. He won only 6 matches and failed to win back-to-back matches in any tournament. His best win was a highly emotional match against Martin Gould in the China Championship qualifying round, which he won 5–4 on the final black. This result allowed him to play in the main event in Guangzhou, close to his hometown of Jieyang, allowing his relatives to see him play professional snooker for the first time. However, he lost to Noppon Saengkham.

In the World Championship Xu produced a magnificent display of scoring to beat Sean O'Sullivan, scoring ten 50+ breaks in successive frames to win the match 10–2. However, he could not repeat this form against Graeme Dott, losing 10–4. His ranking of 77 meant that he was relegated from the tour.

Xu Si came through the first event of the 2019 Q School by winning five matches to earn a two-year card on the World Snooker Tour for the 2019–20 and 2020–21 seasons.

=== 2019/2020 season ===
Xu's third season was similar to his second, winning only 4 matches. It came to a premature end when the COVID-19 outbreak forced the suspension of the season. Xu returned to China and did not return for the resumption in July 2020, thereby missing the World Championship. His final ranking was 110.

=== 2020/2021 season ===
For his fourth season, Xu made some technical changes, adopting the 'Sight Right' method. He also moved to the newly opened Ding Junhui Academy in Sheffield. His results were more consistent, reaching the 3rd round in the UK Championship and the English Open.

In World Championship qualification, Xu needed to win his first match to renew his professional tour card via the 1-year ranking list. His opponent was 7-times World Champion Stephen Hendry, in the third match of his comeback. After a nervous start, Xu won the last 6 frames of the match, with five 50+ breaks, to win 6–1. In the next round he came close to beating top seed Zhou Yuelong, but lost 6–5. He finished the season ranked 77.

=== 2023/2024 season ===
In November 2023, he scored a maximum 147 break at the 2023 UK Championship in a 6–1 win over compatriot Ma Hailong.

== Personal life ==
During the season, Xu Si lives in Sheffield. In the years 2017-20 he was based at the Victoria Snooker Academy, before moving to the Ding Junhui Snooker Academy in 2020. Aside from snooker, Xu enjoys movies and playing computer games.

== Performance and rankings timeline ==
| Tournament | 2013/ 14 | 2014/ 15 | 2015/ 16 | 2016/ 17 | 2017/ 18 | 2018/ 19 | 2019/ 20 | 2020/ 21 | 2021/ 22 | 2022/ 23 | 2023/ 24 | 2024/ 25 | 2025/ 26 | 2026/ 27 |
|---|---|---|---|---|---|---|---|---|---|---|---|---|---|---|
| Ranking (Note: It shows the ranking at the beginning of the season.) | (Note: He was an amateur) | | | | (Note: New players on the Main Tour don't have a ranking) | 74 | (Note: Players qualified through Q School started the season without ranking points) | 84 | (Note: Players qualified One Year Ranking List started the season without ranking points) | 76 | 63 | 58 | 41 | 34 |
Ranking tournaments
| Championship League | Non-Ranking Event | | | | | | | RR | A | RR | RR | RR | 3R | 2R |
| China Open | A | A | A | A | LQ | 1R | Tournament Not Held | | | | | | | LQ |
| Wuhan Open | Tournament Not Held | | | | | | | | | | 2R | 1R | 1R | LQ |
| British Open | Tournament Not Held | | | | | | | | 3R | 2R | 1R | 2R | 1R | LQ |
| English Open | Not Held | | | A | 1R | 2R | 2R | 3R | 1R | 1R | LQ | 2R | 1R | 2R |
| Shenzhen Open (Note: The event was called the Xi'an Grand Prix (2024/2025–2025/2026)) | Tournament Not Held | | | | | | | | | | | QF | 1R | 1R |
| Northern Ireland Open | Not Held | | | A | 1R | 1R | 1R | 2R | 1R | LQ | 1R | LQ | LQ | 2R |
| International Championship | A | A | A | 2R | LQ | LQ | LQ | Not Held | | | LQ | SF | 1R | 2R |
| UK Championship | A | A | A | A | 2R | 1R | 1R | 3R | 1R | 1R | LQ | LQ | 1R | |
| Shoot Out | Non-Ranking Event | | | A | 1R | 1R | 1R | WD | 1R | 3R | 3R | 2R | 1R | |
| Scottish Open | Not Held | | | A | 4R | 1R | 1R | 1R | 2R | 1R | 1R | 1R | LQ | |
| German Masters | A | A | A | A | LQ | LQ | LQ | LQ | LQ | LQ | 3R | 1R | 2R | LQ |
| World Grand Prix | NH | NR | DNQ | DNQ | DNQ | DNQ | DNQ | DNQ | DNQ | DNQ | DNQ | 2R | DNQ | |
| Players Championship (Note: The event was called the Players Tour Championship Grand Final (2013/2014–2015/2016)) | DNQ | DNQ | DNQ | DNQ | DNQ | DNQ | DNQ | DNQ | DNQ | DNQ | DNQ | DNQ | DNQ | |
| Welsh Open | A | A | A | A | 3R | 2R | 1R | 1R | LQ | LQ | LQ | 1R | LQ | |
| World Open | A | A | A | 1R | LQ | LQ | 1R | Not Held | | | 1R | 3R | 2R | |
| Tour Championship | Tournament Not Held | | | | | DNQ | DNQ | DNQ | DNQ | DNQ | DNQ | DNQ | DNQ | |
| World Championship | A | A | A | LQ | LQ | LQ | A | LQ | LQ | LQ | LQ | LQ | LQ | |
Non-ranking tournaments
| Championship League | A | A | A | A | A | A | A | A | A | A | A | A | RR | |
Former ranking tournaments
| Shanghai Masters | A | WR | A | WR | LQ | Non-Ranking | | Not Held | | | Non-Ranking Event | | | |
| Paul Hunter Classic | Minor-Ranking | | | A | 1R | A | NR | Tournament Not Held | | | | | | |
| Indian Open | A | A | NH | A | SF | LQ | Tournament Not Held | | | | | | | |
| Riga Masters | NH | Minor-Ranking | | A | LQ | 1R | LQ | Tournament Not Held | | | | | | |
| China Championship | Not Held | | | NR | LQ | 1R | LQ | Tournament Not Held | | | | | | |
| WST Pro Series | Tournament Not Held | | | | | | | RR | Tournament Not Held | | | | | |
| Turkish Masters | Tournament Not Held | | | | | | | | LQ | Tournament Not Held | | | | |
| Gibraltar Open | Not Held | | MR | A | 1R | 1R | 2R | 1R | WD | Tournament Not Held | | | | |
| WST Classic | Tournament Not Held | | | | | | | | | 3R | Tournament Not Held | | | |
| European Masters | Not Held | | | A | LQ | LQ | LQ | 1R | 1R | LQ | 1R | Not Held | | |
| Saudi Arabia Masters | Tournament Not Held | | | | | | | | | | | 2R | 3R | NH |
Former non-ranking tournaments
| Six-red World Championship | A | A | A | A | A | A | A | Not Held | | LQ | Tournament Not Held | | | |
| Haining Open | NH | Minor-Ranking | | 1R | A | A | 2R | NH | A | A | Tournament Not Held | | | |

Performance Table Legend
| LQ | lost in the qualifying draw | #R | lost in the early rounds of the tournament (WR = Wildcard round, RR = Round robin) | QF | lost in the quarter-finals |
| SF | lost in the semi-finals | F | lost in the final | W | won the tournament |
| DNQ | did not qualify for the tournament | A | did not participate in the tournament | WD | withdrew from the tournament |

| NH / Not Held | means an event was not held. |
| NR / Non-Ranking Event | means an event is/was no longer a ranking event. |
| R / Ranking Event | means an event is/was a ranking event. |
| MR / Minor-Ranking Event | means an event is/was a minor-ranking event. |

== Career finals ==
=== Amateur finals: 1 (1 title) ===
| Outcome | No. | Year | Championship | Opponent in the final | Score |
|---|---|---|---|---|---|
| Winner | 1. | 2016 | IBSF World Under-21 Championship | (Switzerland) Alexander Ursenbacher | 6–5 |
