= 2017 Indian Open =

Indian Open
Tournament information
- Dates: 12–16 September 2017
- Venue: Hotel Novotel Varun Beach
- City: Vishakhapatnam
- Country: India
- Organisation: World Snooker
- Format: Ranking event
- Total prize fund: £323,000
- Winner's share: £50,000
- Highest break: Zhou Yuelong (CHN) (141)

Final
- Champion: John Higgins (SCO)
- Runner-up: Anthony McGill (SCO)
- Score: 5–1

The 2017 Indian Open was a professional ranking snooker tournament that took place between 12 and 16 September 2017 in Vishakhapatnam, India. It was the fourth ranking event of the 2017/2018 season.

Qualifying took place between 1 and 2 August 2017 in Preston, England.

Anthony McGill was the defending champion, having beaten Kyren Wilson 5–2 in the 2016 final. McGill reached the final again but was beaten by John Higgins, who won his 29th ranking event.

== Prize fund ==
The breakdown of prize money for this year is shown below:

- Winner: £50,000
- Runner-up: £25,000
- Semi-final: £15,000
- Quarter-final: £10,000
- Last 16: £6,000
- Last 32: £4,000
- Last 64: £2,000
- Televised highest break: £2,000
- Total: £323,000

The "rolling 147 prize" for a maximum break stood at £25,000.

== Main draw ==
Last 64; Best of 7 frames
(Scotland) Anthony McGill	4
(England) Ashley Hugill	1
(Wales) Jackson Page	3
(England) Rory McLeod	4
(England) Anthony Hamilton	1
(Iran) Hossein Vafaei	4
(Northern Ireland) Gerard Greene	4
(China) Li Hang	1
(China) Tian Pengfei	4
(England) Tom Ford	3
(China) Zhang Anda	4
(Iran) Soheil Vahedi	3
(England) Sam Baird	4
(England) Mark Davis	2
(England) John Astley	3
(Republic of Ireland) Ken Doherty	4
(England) Stuart Bingham	4
(Wales) Duane Jones	1
(England) Matthew Selt	4
(China) Cao Yupeng	0
(England) Mark King	w/o
(England) Adam Duffy	w/d
(Scotland) Graeme Dott	4
(England) Jack Lisowski	1
(England) Elliot Slessor	4
(Scotland) Alan McManus	3
(Wales) Daniel Wells	1
(England) Joe Perry	4
(Republic of Ireland) Fergal O'Brien	4
(England) Jimmy Robertson	3
(England) Hammad Miah	0
(England) Shaun Murphy	4
(Finland) Robin Hull	0
(China) Xu Si	4
(England) Sean O'Sullivan	4
(Republic of Ireland) Josh Boileau	3
(England) Ricky Walden	4
(England) Alfie Burden	3
(England) Ben Woollaston	w/o
(China) Yan Bingtao	w/d
(Norway) Kurt Maflin	4
(China) Zhou Yuelong	2
(China) Wang Yuchen	0
(England) David Gilbert	4
(England) Andrew Higginson	1
(Switzerland) Alexander Ursenbacher	4
(China) Niu Zhuang	0
(Northern Ireland) Mark Allen	4
(Thailand) Boonyarit Keattikun	1
(England) Liam Highfield	4
(England) Robert Milkins	3
(China) Yu Delu	4
(Scotland) Stephen Maguire	3
(Thailand) Sunny Akani	4
(Wales) Dominic Dale	4
(England) Rod Lawler	1
(England) Gary Wilson	4
(Belgium) Luca Brecel	1
(Wales) Ian Preece	2
(England) Michael Holt	4
(England) Mike Dunn	3
(England) Martin O'Donnell	4
(China) Zhao Xintong	3
(Scotland) John Higgins	4

Last 32; Best of 7 frames
(Scotland) Anthony McGill	4
(England) Rory McLeod	1
(Iran) Hossein Vafaei	4
(Northern Ireland) Gerard Greene	2
(China) Tian Pengfei	2
(China) Zhang Anda	4
(England) Sam Baird	3
(Republic of Ireland) Ken Doherty	4
(England) Stuart Bingham	4
(England) Matthew Selt	1
(England) Mark King	4
(Scotland) Graeme Dott	1
(England) Elliot Slessor	4
(England) Joe Perry	3
(Republic of Ireland) Fergal O'Brien	1
(England) Shaun Murphy	4
(China) Xu Si	4
(England) Sean O'Sullivan	3
(England) Ricky Walden	4
(England) Ben Woollaston	2
(Norway) Kurt Maflin	3
(England) David Gilbert	4
(Switzerland) Alexander Ursenbacher	2
(Northern Ireland) Mark Allen	4
(England) Liam Highfield	4
(China) Yu Delu	3
(Thailand) Sunny Akani	4
(Wales) Dominic Dale	0
(England) Gary Wilson	2
(England) Michael Holt	4
(England) Martin O'Donnell	2
(Scotland) John Higgins	4

Last 16; Best of 7 frames
(Scotland) Anthony McGill	4
(Iran) Hossein Vafaei	1
(China) Zhang Anda	4
(Republic of Ireland) Ken Doherty	3
(England) Stuart Bingham	3
(England) Mark King	4
(England) Elliot Slessor	4
(England) Shaun Murphy	1
(China) Xu Si	4
(England) Ricky Walden	3
(England) David Gilbert	4
(Northern Ireland) Mark Allen	1
(England) Liam Highfield	4
(Thailand) Sunny Akani	2
(England) Michael Holt	1
(Scotland) John Higgins	4

Quarter-finals; Best of 7 frames
(Scotland) Anthony McGill	4
(China) Zhang Anda	0
(England) Mark King	4
(England) Elliot Slessor	2
(China) Xu Si	4
(England) David Gilbert	0
(England) Liam Highfield	0
(Scotland) John Higgins	4

Semi-finals; Best of 7 frames
(Scotland) Anthony McGill	4
(England) Mark King	3
(China) Xu Si	2
(Scotland) John Higgins	4

Final; Best of 9 frames
(Scotland) Anthony McGill	1
(Scotland) John Higgins	5

== Final ==
Final: Best of 9 frames. Referee: Terry Camilleri; Hotel Novotel Varun Beach, Vishakhapatnam, India, 16 September 2017.
Anthony McGill; Scotland	1–5	John Higgins; Scotland
2–70, 43–84, 78–28, 0–71 (71), 35–71, 1–104
49	Highest break	71
0	Century breaks	0
0	50+ breaks	1

== Qualifying ==
These matches were held between 1 and 2 August 2017 at the Preston Guild Hall in Preston, England. All matches were best of 7 frames.

(Scotland) Anthony McGill	4–0 (Note: Match was held over and played in India.)	(India) Aditya Mehta
(England) Mitchell Mann	1–4	(England) Ashley Hugill
(Thailand) Thepchaiya Un-Nooh	0–4	(Wales) Jackson Page
(England) Rory McLeod	4–2	(Scotland) Ross Muir
(England) Anthony Hamilton	4–3	(Malta) Alex Borg
(Iran) Hossein Vafaei	4–3	(England) Sanderson Lam
(Wales) Michael White	w/d–w/o	(Northern Ireland) Gerard Greene
(China) Li Hang	4–1	(India) S Shrikrishna (Note: Wildcard)
(China) Tian Pengfei	4–2	(Scotland) Eden Sharav
(England) Tom Ford	4–0	(Scotland) Chris Totten
(China) Zhang Anda	4–0	(China) Lyu Haotian
(England) Martin Gould	1–4	(Iran) Soheil Vahedi
(England) Sam Baird	4–2	(India) Lucky Vatnani
(England) Mark Davis	4–0	(India) Laxman Rawat
(England) John Astley	4–0	(England) Paul Davison
(England) Ali Carter	2–4	(Republic of Ireland) Ken Doherty
(England) Stuart Bingham	4–1	(China) Chen Zifan
(China) Mei Xiwen	2–4	(Wales) Duane Jones
(England) Matthew Selt	4–3	(China) Chen Zhe
(England) Mark Joyce	2–4	(China) Cao Yupeng
(England) Mark King	4–2	(England) Nigel Bond
(Thailand) Noppon Saengkham	2–4	(England) Adam Duffy
(Scotland) Graeme Dott	4–3	(China) Fang Xiongman
(England) Jack Lisowski	4–1	(Northern Ireland) Joe Swail
(Wales) Matthew Stevens	2–4	(England) Elliot Slessor
(Scotland) Alan McManus	4–0	(India) Malkeet Singh
(Wales) Daniel Wells	4–1	(England) Billy Joe Castle
(England) Joe Perry	w/o–w/d	(Pakistan) Hamza Akbar
(Republic of Ireland) Fergal O'Brien	4–0	(England) Craig Steadman
(England) Jimmy Robertson	4–2	(Wales) Jak Jones
(England) Hammad Miah	w/o–w/d	(Thailand) Kritsanut Lertsattayathorn
(England) Shaun Murphy	4–2	(India) E Pandurangaiah

(Australia) Neil Robertson	w/d–w/o	(Finland) Robin Hull
(Cyprus) Michael Georgiou	2–4	(China) Xu Si
(China) Xiao Guodong	3–4	(England) Sean O'Sullivan
(England) David Grace	3–4	(Republic of Ireland) Josh Boileau
(England) Ricky Walden	4–2	(England) Jimmy White
(England) Alfie Burden	4–2	(England) Jamie Curtis-Barrett
(England) Ben Woollaston	4–2	(England) Sam Craigie
(China) Yan Bingtao	4–2	(Scotland) Rhys Clark
(Norway) Kurt Maflin	4–2	(Thailand) James Wattana
(China) Zhou Yuelong	4–0	(Australia) Kurt Dunham
(England) Chris Wakelin	3–4	(China) Wang Yuchen
(England) David Gilbert	4–2	(England) Allan Taylor
(England) Andrew Higginson	4–0	(India) Asutosh Padhy
(Wales) Jamie Jones	1–4	(Switzerland) Alexander Ursenbacher
(Wales) Lee Walker	1–4	(China) Niu Zhuang
(Northern Ireland) Mark Allen	4–3	(Malaysia) Thor Chuan Leong
(England) Kyren Wilson	2–4	(Thailand) Boonyarit Keattikun
(England) Liam Highfield	4–0	(Australia) Matthew Bolton
(England) Robert Milkins	4–2	(China) Yuan Sijun
(China) Yu Delu	4–2	(England) Ian Burns
(Scotland) Stephen Maguire	4–0	(China) Hu Hao
(Scotland) Scott Donaldson	2–4	(Thailand) Sunny Akani
(Wales) Dominic Dale	4–2	(China) Zhang Yong
(England) Robbie Williams	2–4	(England) Rod Lawler
(England) Gary Wilson	4–1	(Germany) Lukas Kleckers
(Belgium) Luca Brecel	4–0	(England) Christopher Keogan
(England) Oliver Lines	0–4	(Wales) Ian Preece
(England) Michael Holt	4–2	(England) Peter Lines
(England) Mike Dunn	4–0	(Wales) Jamie Clarke
(England) Peter Ebdon	2–4	(England) Martin O'Donnell
(China) Zhao Xintong	4–0	(China) Li Yuan
(Scotland) John Higgins	4–1	(Wales) David John

== Century breaks ==
=== Qualifying stage centuries ===
Total: 18

- 139 – Michael Georgiou
- 128 – Dominic Dale
- 126 – Sam Craigie
- 121 – Eden Sharav
- 117 – Mark Joyce
- 114 – Gary Wilson
- 113 – Yu Delu
- 109 – Jimmy Robertson
- 108 – Daniel Wells
- 104 – Stephen Maguire
- 103 – Jimmy White
- 102 – Zhang Anda
- 102 – Mike Dunn
- 101 – Peter Ebdon
- 101 – Fergal O'Brien
- 101 – Allan Taylor
- 101 – Mitchell Mann
- 100 – Josh Boileau

=== Televised stage centuries ===
Total: 14

- 141 – Zhou Yuelong
- 135 – Kurt Maflin
- 125, 105, 102 – Shaun Murphy
- 122, 102 – John Higgins
- 112, 102 – David Gilbert
- 112 – Stephen Maguire
- 110 – Mark King
- 108 – Alan McManus
- 103 – Gary Wilson
- 101 – Stuart Bingham
