= 2017 EBSA European Under-21 Snooker Championship =

EBSA European Under-21 Snooker Championship
Tournament information
- Dates: 8–12 March 2016
- City: Nicosia
- Country: Cyprus
- Organisation: EBSA
- Highest break: (Poland) Mateusz Baranowski (127)

Final
- Champion: (Switzerland) Alexander Ursenbacher
- Runner-up: (Wales) Jackson Page
- Score: 6–4

The 2017 EBSA European Under-21 Snooker Championship was an amateur snooker tournament that is taking place from 8 March to 12 March 2017 in Nicosia, Cyprus. It is the 21st edition of the EBSA European Under-21 Snooker Championships and also doubles as a qualification event for the World Snooker Tour.

== Results ==
=== Round 1 ===
Best of 7 frames

33	(Czech Republic) Ales Herout	2–4	32	(Republic of Ireland) Stephen Bateman
17	(Poland) Daniel Holoyda	4–1	48	(Northern Ireland) Michael Kane
49	(Belgium) Jesse Schelfhaut	1–4	16	(Poland) Paweł Rogoza
41	(Romania) Tudor Popescu	0–4	24	(France) Niel Vincent
25	(Israel) Maor Shalom	2–4	40	(Sweden) Belan Sharif
37	(Wales) Ben Fortey	3–4	28	(Poland) Patryk Masłowski
21	(Belgium) Sybren Sokolowski	4–1	44	(Belgium) Brent Geentjens
53	(Lithuania) Marius Stanaitis	1–4	12	(Northern Ireland) Fergal Quinn
13	(Poland) Mateusz Baranowski	4–0	52	(Romania) Alexandru Statache
45	(Cyprus) Mehrab Soltanali	1–4	20	(England) Jordan Winbourne
29	(Austria) Markus Pfistermüller	0–4	36	(Germany) Michael Schnabel

35	(Northern Ireland) Eamon Ferris	4–2	30	(Republic of Ireland) Adam Fitzgerald
19	(Germany) Lukas Kleckers	4–1	46	(Russia) Ivan Kakovsky
51	(Croatia) Luka Lepesic	0–4	14	(England) Peter Devlin
11	(England) Lewis Gillen	4–0	54	(Switzerland) Marvin Losi
43	(France) Nicolas Mortreux	0–4	22	(Malta) Brian Cini
27	(Poland) Karol Lelek	4–2	38	(Bulgaria) Spasian Spasov
39	(Wales) Dylan Emery	4–0	26	(Northern Ireland) Peter Berryman
23	(Wales) Tyler Rees	4–0	42	(England) Brandon Sargeant
15	(Scotland) Chris Totten	4–0	50	(Hungary) Balázs Morvay
47	(Croatia) Jan Jelenić	2–4	18	(Israel) Amir Nardeia
31	(Romania) Mihai Vladu	1–4	34	(Republic of Ireland) Noel Landers

Round 2 Best of 7 frames
1	(Switzerland) Alexander Ursenbacher	4
32	(Republic of Ireland) Stephen Bateman	2
17	(Poland) Daniel Holoyda	3
16	(Poland) Paweł Rogoza	4
9	(Latvia) Rodion Judin	4
24	(France) Niel Vincent	3
40	(Sweden) Belan Sharif	0
8	(France) Brian Ochoiski	4
5	(Estonia) Andres Petrov	4
28	(Poland) Patryk Masłowski	0
21	(Belgium) Sybren Sokolowski	4
12	(Northern Ireland) Fergal Quinn	3
13	(Poland) Mateusz Baranowski	4
20	(England) Jordan Winbourne	3
36	(Germany) Michael Schnabel	3
4	(Germany) Simon Lichtenberg	4
3	(England) Richard Haney	4
30	(Northern Ireland) Eamon Ferris	2
19	(Germany) Lukas Kleckers	1
14	(England) Peter Devlin	4
11	(England) Lewis Gillen	3
22	(Malta) Brian Cini	4
27	(Poland) Karol Lelek	0
6	(Wales) Jackson Page	4
7	(Republic of Ireland) Charlie Sweeney	4
39	(Wales) Dylan Emery	3
23	(Wales) Tyler Rees	4
10	(Austria) Florian Nüßle	0
15	(Scotland) Chris Totten	2
18	(Israel) Amir Nardeia	4
34	(Republic of Ireland) Noel Landers	3
2	(Scotland) Dylan Craig	4

Round 3 Best of 7 frames
1	(Switzerland) Alexander Ursenbacher	4
16	(Poland) Paweł Rogoza	0
9	(Latvia) Rodion Judin	1
8	(France) Brian Ochoiski	4
5	(Estonia) Andres Petrov	4
21	(Belgium) Sybren Sokolowski	1
13	(Poland) Mateusz Baranowski	4
4	(Germany) Simon Lichtenberg	1
3	(England) Richard Haney	3
14	(England) Peter Devlin	4
11	(Malta) Brian Cini	0
6	(Wales) Jackson Page	4
7	(Republic of Ireland) Charlie Sweeney	2
23	(Wales) Tyler Rees	4
15	(Israel) Amir Nardeia	0
2	(Scotland) Dylan Craig	4

Quarter-Finals; Best of 9 frames
1	(Switzerland) Alexander Ursenbacher	5
8	(France) Brian Ochoiski	3
5	(Estonia) Andres Petrov	5
13	(Poland) Mateusz Baranowski	3
14	(England) Peter Devlin	4
6	(Wales) Jackson Page	5
23	(Wales) Tyler Rees	5
2	(Scotland) Dylan Craig	4

Semi-Finals; Best of 9 frames
1	(Switzerland) Alexander Ursenbacher	5
5	(Estonia) Andres Petrov	0
6	(Wales) Jackson Page	5
23	(Wales) Tyler Rees	2

Final; Best of 11 frames
1	(Switzerland) Alexander Ursenbacher	6
6	(Wales) Jackson Page	4
