= 2016 World Snooker Championship =

Professional snooker tournament

2016 Betfred World Snooker Championship

Tournament information
- Dates: 16 April – 2 May 2016
- Venue: Crucible Theatre
- City: Sheffield
- Country: England
- Organisation: World Snooker
- Format: Ranking event
- Total prize fund: £1,500,100
- Winner's share: £330,000
- Highest break: Kyren Wilson (ENG) (143)

Final
- Champion: Mark Selby (ENG)
- Runner-up: Ding Junhui (CHN)
- Score: 18–14

The 2016 World Snooker Championship (officially the 2016 Betfred World Snooker Championship) was a professional snooker tournament that took place from 16 April to 2 May 2016 at the Crucible Theatre in Sheffield, England. It was the 40th year that the World Snooker Championship had been held at the venue. The event was the tenth and last event that carried ranking points of the 2015–16 snooker season.

Stuart Bingham was the defending champion, having defeated Shaun Murphy in the 2015 event final. Bingham lost 9–10 against Ali Carter in the first round, falling to the Crucible curse and becoming the 17th first-time champion unable to defend his title at the venue. Alan McManus and Ding Junhui set a record in their semi-final for the most century breaks achieved in a professional match, scoring ten. Ding also set a record for the most centuries by one player in a single World Championship match with seven. Ding defeated McManus to become the first Asian player to reach a World Championship final. In the other semi-final, Englishman Mark Selby and Hongkonger Marco Fu set a record for the longest frame of snooker ever played at the Crucible, at 76 minutes 11 seconds.

After beating Robert Milkins 10–6, Sam Baird 13–11, Kyren Wilson 13–8, and Fu 17–15, Selby defeated Ding 18–14 in the final to claim his second World title, having won the 2014 event previously. A total of 86 century breaks were made at the event, the same number as the previous year; Kyren Wilson made the tournament's highest break of 143. The global audiences for the tournament exceeded 300 million, 210 million viewers in China alone. The afternoon sessions of the final were watched by audiences of 45 million in China, the country's largest audience for a sporting event that year. During the tournament, six-time champion Steve Davis played the last professional match of his 38-year career against Fergal O'Brien in the qualifier and announced his retirement during the first round of the event.

== Overview ==
The World Snooker Championship is an annual cue sport tournament and is the official professional world championship of the game of snooker. (Note: The Championship was founded as the "Professional Snooker Championship" until 1934, and became a knockout tournament in 1969.) The sport of snooker was founded in the late 19th century by British Army soldiers stationed in India.

The world championship sees 32 professional players compete in one-on-one snooker matches in a single elimination format, each played over several frames. The 32 players for the event are selected through a mix of the world snooker rankings and pre-tournament qualification rounds. The first world championship was held in 1927 at Camkin's Hall, Birmingham, England, and was won by Joe Davis. Since 1977, the event has been held in the Crucible Theatre in Sheffield, England.

As of 2022, Stephen Hendry and Ronnie O’Sullivan are the event's most successful participants in the modern era, having both won the championship seven times. The previous year's championship had been won by England's Stuart Bingham, who defeated Shaun Murphy in the final 18–15. This was Bingham's first championship win. The winner of the 2016 event earned prize money of £330,000, from a total pool of £1.5 million. The event was the tenth and last ranking event of the 2015–2016 season.

=== Prize fund ===
The total prize money of the event was raised to £1,500,100 from £1,364,000 the previous year. The breakdown of prize money for this year is shown below:

- Winner: £330,000
- Runner-up: £137,500
- Semi-final: £66,000
- Quarter-final: £33,000
- Last 16: £22,000
- Last 32: £13,250
- Last 48: £9,900
- Last 80: £6,600
- Televised highest break: £10,000
- Total: £1,500,100

The prize for a maximum break stood at £20,000.

== Tournament summary ==
=== Seeding and qualifying rounds ===
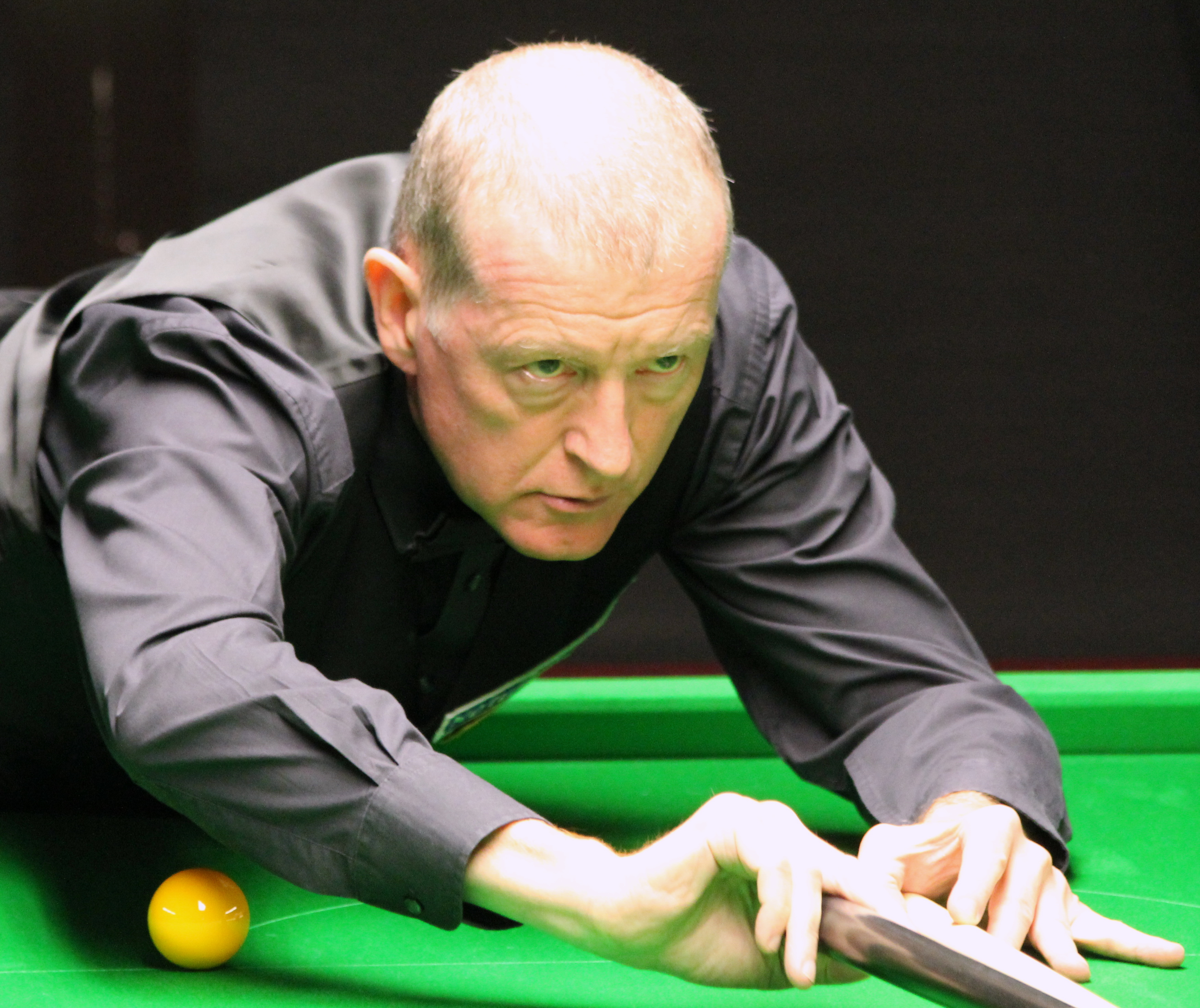
Steve Davis played his last professional match in the qualifying rounds.

The top 16 seeds automatically qualified for the first round. Defending champion Bingham was seeded first, and other seeded places were allocated based on the latest world rankings. Professional players below 17th place in rankings, and 16 invited amateur players started in the first round of qualifying, and were required to win three best-of-19-frame matches to reach the Crucible. Qualifying rounds were held at the Ponds Forge International Sports Centre in Sheffield from 6 to 13 April 2016.

Eleven former world champions competed in the tournament. Six-time champion Davis lost 4–10 to Fergal O'Brien in the first round of qualifying, and subsequently announced his retirement from the sport after 38 years as a professional. The 1997 champion Ken Doherty lost 6–10 to Ryan Day in the final round of qualifying. Former world number one Ding Junhui was no longer in the top 16 ranked players before the tournament, and had to qualify to the Crucible. He did that with the loss of only seven frames, defeating Greg Casey 10–4, Ross Muir 10–1, and the 1995 runner-up Nigel Bond 10–2.

Thepchaiya Un-Nooh missed the final black ball in attempting a maximum break against Anthony McGill in the fourth frame of their final qualifying round match. Un-Nooh had also missed the last black in attempting a maximum break earlier in the season, in a match against Neil Robertson in the 2015 UK Championship. Hong Kong's Ng On-yee attempted to become the first woman ever to reach the main stage of the event; she lost 1–10 against Peter Lines in the first round of qualifying.

=== First round ===
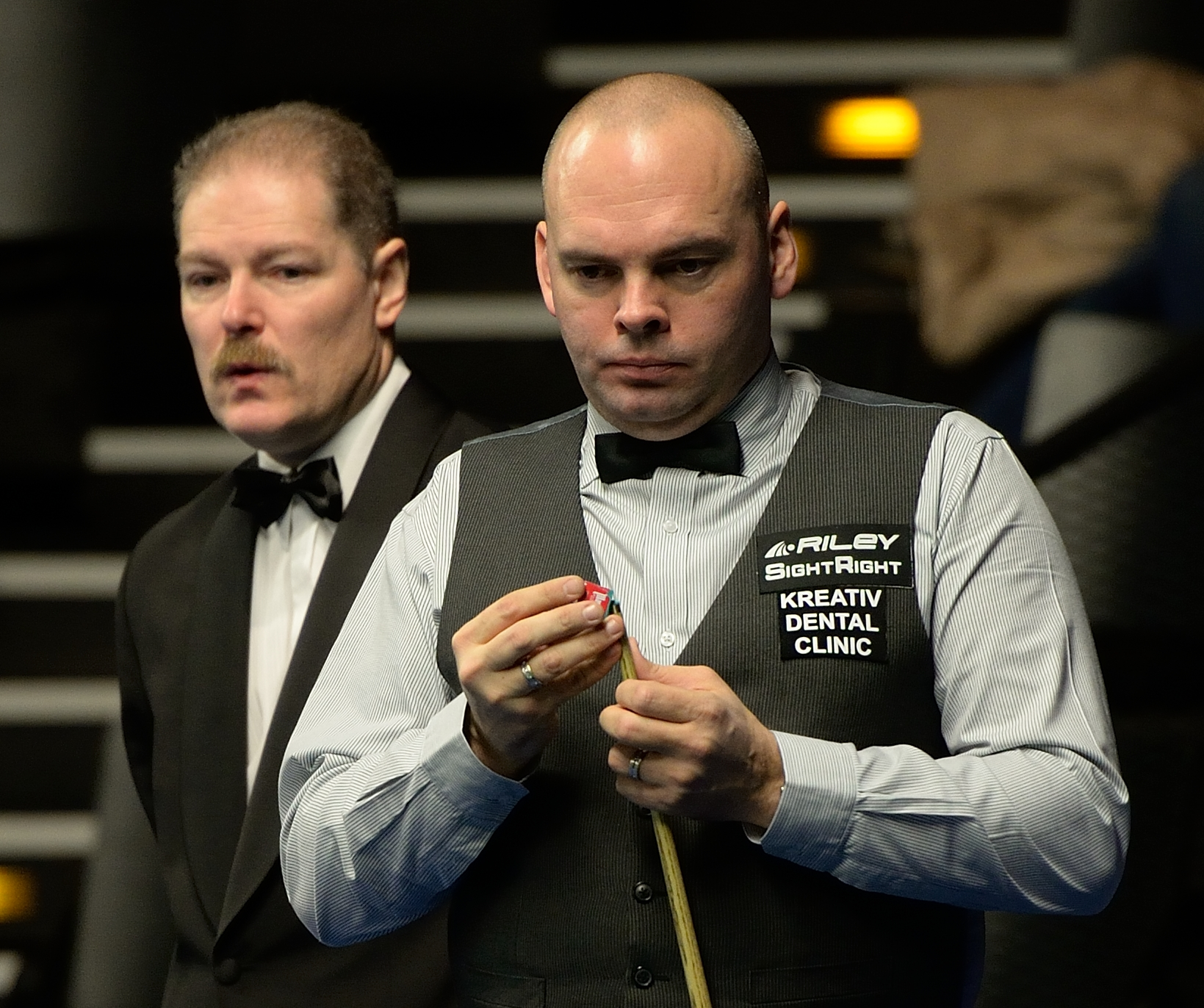
Defending champion Stuart Bingham lost in the first round.

The first round was played between 16 and 21 April as best-of-19-frame matches. Mitchell Mann was the only player making his Crucible debut. He lost 3–10 in the first round to Mark Allen. Steve Davis announced his retirement on live television during the tournament's first weekend, before play began on the first Sunday afternoon.

Playing the defending champion Bingham, Ali Carter led 5–1 and 8–5 before Bingham won four consecutive frames to lead 9–8. Carter tied the match with a century break in the 18th frame, before taking the deciding frame to win 10–9. The loss made Bingham the 17th player to succumb to the Crucible curse, as no first time defending champion won the event the following season. Shaun Murphy, the previous year's runner-up, also received a first-round exit when he lost 8–10 to McGill. This was the first time since the 1980 championship that both of the previous year's finalists lost the first matches they played upon their return.

Stephen Maguire lost 7–10 to Alan McManus in his fourth consecutive first-round defeat at the Crucible. As a result, Maguire was guaranteed to be outside of the world's top 16 at the end of the tournament. After his 10–7 victory over David Gilbert, Ronnie O'Sullivan refused to attend a post-match meeting with the press or talk to tournament broadcasters, and received a formal warning from World Snooker. Following losses by Ebdon and Dott, Robertson became the fifth former champion to exit in the first round when Michael Holt defeated him 10–6. This meant that O'Sullivan, Selby, Williams, and Higgins were the only former winners to reach the second round.

=== Second round ===
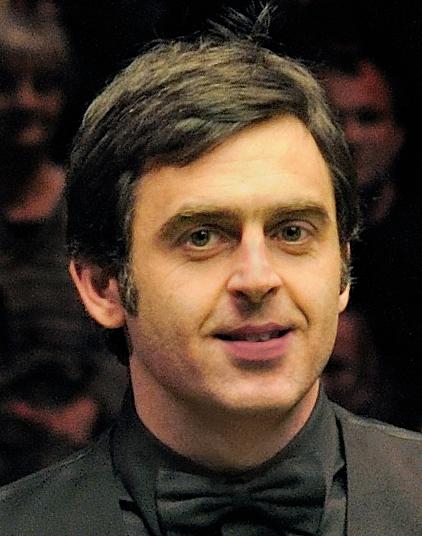
Ronnie O'Sullivan failed to reach the quarterfinals for just the second time in 13 years.

The second round was played between 21 and 25 April as best-of-25-frames, over three sessions. McManus won 13–11 over Carter, who had defeated him 10–5 in the first round in 2015. Ding Junhui won 13–10 over Judd Trump, who had defeated him 13–4 in the previous year's quarter-finals. Carter was strongly critical of the table on which he played McManus, calling it "the worst I have ever played on." Tournament organisers later changed the cloth and cushions used on the tables.

Kyren Wilson led at both 7–0 and then 11–5 over Allen before Allen won four straight frames to trail 11–9, but Wilson won the next two to win the match 13–9 and advance to his first World Championship quarter-final. Mark Selby led Sam Baird 11–7 before Baird won four consecutive frames to level at 11–11. Selby then won the next two frames to win 13–11. Four-time champion John Higgins beat Ricky Walden 13–8, and two-time champion Mark Williams defeated Michael Holt, also 13–8, to get past the second round for only the second time since 2006. Marco Fu defeated Anthony McGill 13–9 to reach his first quarter-final in a decade.

Trailing Barry Hawkins 9–12, Ronnie O'Sullivan won three consecutive frames to take the match to a deciding frame. Hawkins prevailed in the decider to win the match 13–12, the first time in 14 years that he had beaten O'Sullivan in a competitive match. This was also only the second time in 13 years that O'Sullivan had failed to reach the quarter-finals. Despite losing, O'Sullivan made four century breaks and eight more breaks over 50, scoring 1,409 points to Hawkins's 1,135.

=== Quarter-finals ===
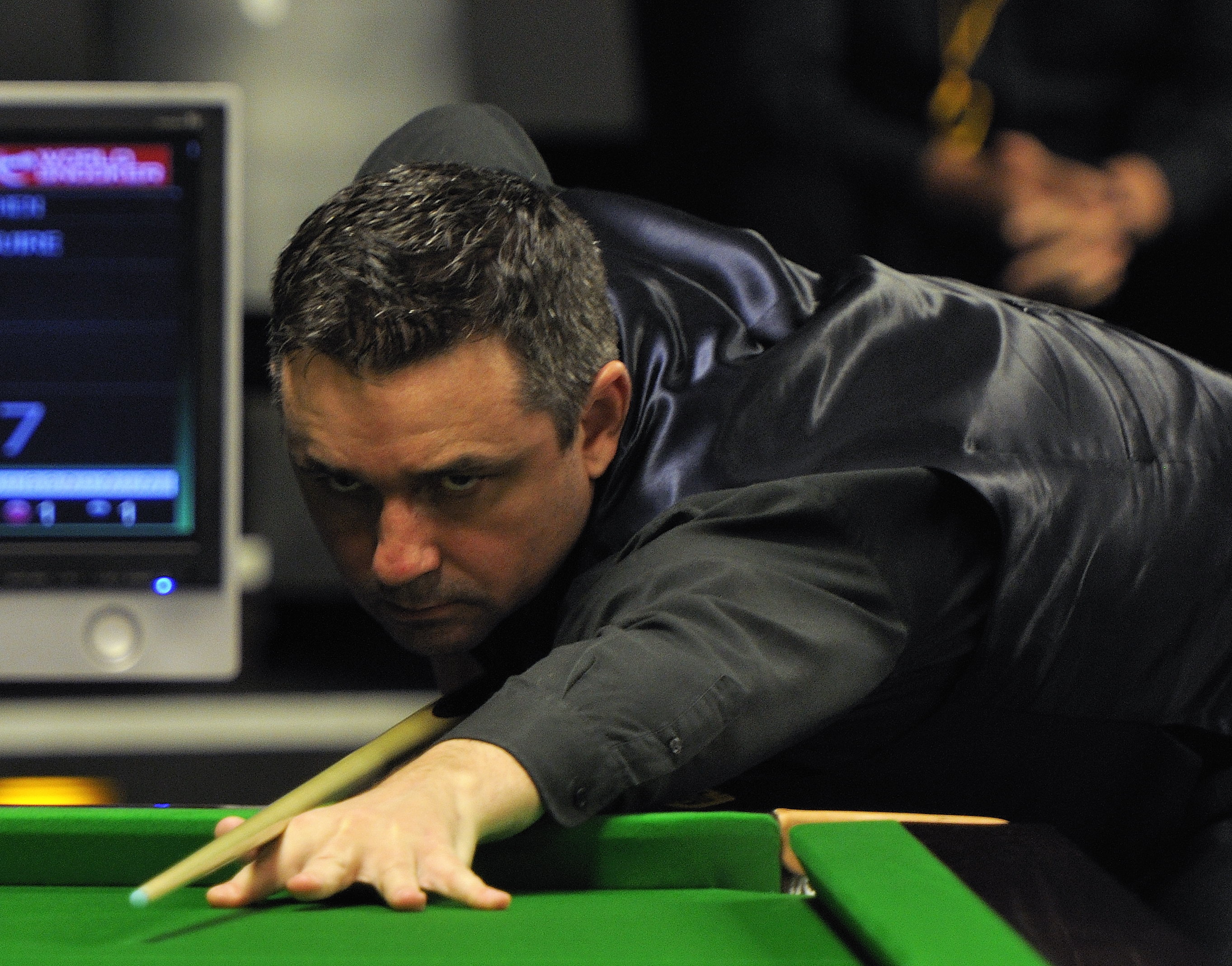
Alan McManus reached his first Crucible semi-final in 23 years.

The quarter-finals were played between 26 and 27 April as best-of-25-frames, over three sessions. Ding's 13–3 victory over Mark Williams saw him win the match with a session to spare to reach his second Crucible semi-final, after his first appearance in 2011. After going 6–0 ahead, Mark Selby defeated Kyren Wilson 13–8. Wilson made a 143 break in the 20th frame, the highest of the tournament.

Alan McManus came from 9–11 behind against John Higgins to win 13–11 and reach his first Crucible semi-final since 1993. At the age of 45, he became the oldest Crucible semi-finalist since Ray Reardon, who was 52 when he reached that stage in 1985. Marco Fu led Hawkins by 9–1 before Hawkins won five straight frames. Fu won 13–11 to reach his second Crucible semi-final, a decade after his first in 2006.

=== Semi-finals ===
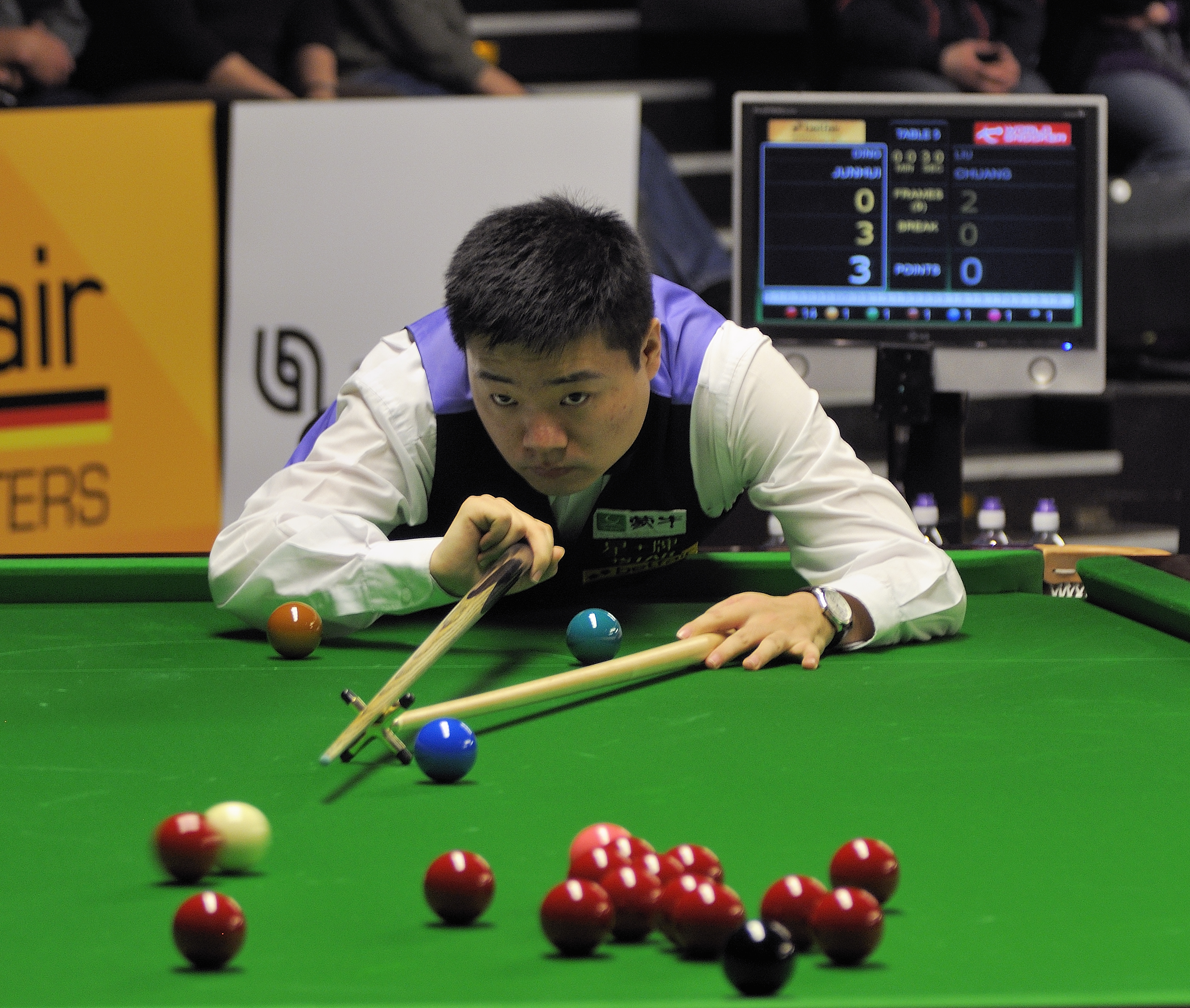
Ding Junhui became the first Asian finalist at the Crucible.

The semi-finals were played from 28 to 30 April over four sessions as best-of-33-frame matches. In the first, Ding was leading McManus 5–0 and 9–3, scoring five centuries in nine frames. McManus won five consecutive frames to trail 8–9. Ding increased his lead to 12–8, and won 17–11 to reach his first World Championship final. In frame 20, Ding attempted a maximum break, but missed the 15th black for a break of 113, his sixth century. In the 27th frame, Ding made his seventh century to set a new record for the most centuries made by a player in a World Championship match. The record surpassed the previous record of six centuries set by Davis in 1946, (Note: The 1946 final was played as the best-of-145 frames) Mark Selby in 2011, and Ronnie O'Sullivan in 2013. Ding's seven centuries equalled the record for the most by one player in any professional snooker match, set by Hendry in the 1994 UK Championship final. In total, 10 centuries were made in the match, which was a record in professional play.

In the opening session of the other semi-final, Mark Selby took a 3–0 and 5–3 lead, before Marco Fu ended the second session all-square at 8–8. Fu's cue tip separated from his cue in the 15th frame as he was chalking it. A ten-minute break was called while the tip was glued back on. Frame 24, won by Selby to level at 12–12, lasted 76 minutes 11 seconds. This was the longest frame ever played at the Crucible, breaking the previous record of 74 minutes 58 seconds set in the 2009 match between Maguire and Mark King. The match was later tied at 15–15 until Selby won the final two frames to win the match 17–15. Frame 32 also lasted more than an hour.

=== Final ===
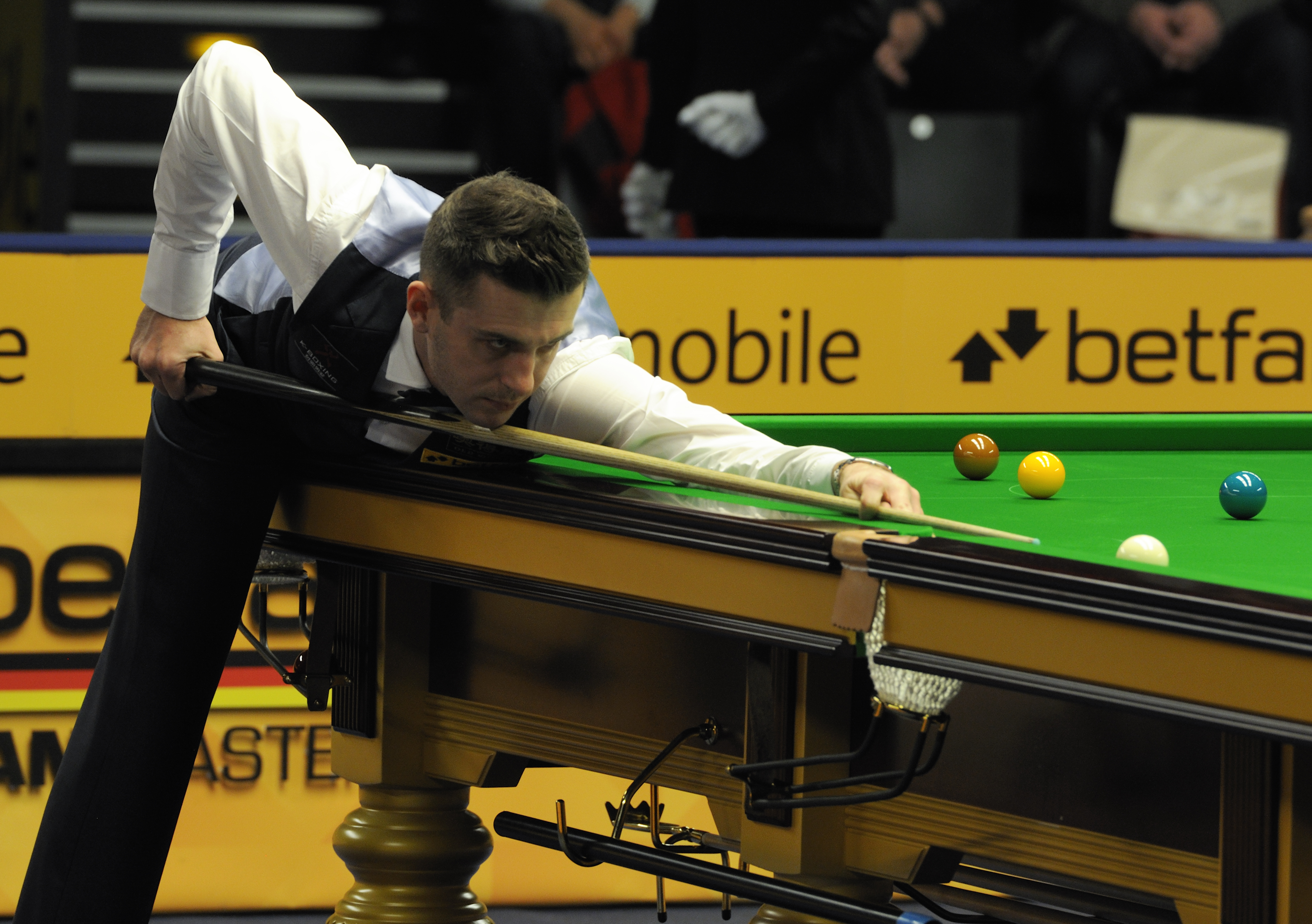
Mark Selby played in his third World Championship final and won his second world title.

The final was played 1–2 May, held as best-of-35-frames, over four sessions. Ding was the first qualifier to play the World final since Trump was beaten by John Higgins in 2011. Ding also became the first Asian finalist in the championships.

In the first session of the final, Mark Selby took a 6–0 lead, before Ding won the last two frames of the session to leave Selby 6–2 ahead. Ding won five of the next seven frames to trail by only one frame at 7–8, but Selby won the final two frames of the day for a 10–7 overnight lead. Some frames in the second session were lengthy, and play did not end at the Crucible until 00:24 local time on Monday morning.

On the second day of the final, Ding again fought back to trailing by only one frame at 10–11; Selby won three of the session's last four frames to go into the final session 14–11 ahead. Selby won the next two frames to need only two more frames for victory. Ding won three more frames in the evening session – coming from 16 to 11 behind to 16–14. Selby clinched the match by 18 frames to 14 to claim his second world title, along with the £330,000 prize. The match ended just minutes after Selby's home city of Leicester celebrated Leicester City F.C.'s first ever Premier League title win. The afternoon session of the final was watched by 45 million people in China, the country's largest audience for a sporting event that year. The event as a whole attracted 300 million viewers in China, including 210 million on CCTV-5.

== Main draw ==
Shown below are the results for each round. The numbers in parentheses beside some of the players are their seeding. Players in bold denote match winners.

**First round** Best of 19 frames
16 April
Stuart Bingham (ENG) (1)	9
**Ali Carter (ENG)**	**10**
16 & 17 April
Stephen Maguire (SCO) (16)	7
**Alan McManus (SCO)**	**10**
17 & 18 April
**Ricky Walden (ENG) (9)**	**10**
Robbie Williams (ENG)	8
18 & 19 April
**John Higgins (SCO) (8)**	**10**
Ryan Day (WAL)	3
20 & 21 April
**Judd Trump (ENG) (5)**	**10**
Liang Wenbo (CHN)	8
20 April
Martin Gould (ENG) (12)	8
**Ding Junhui (CHN)**	**10**
17 & 18 April
**Mark Williams (WAL) (13)**	**10**
Graeme Dott (SCO)	4
19 April
Neil Robertson (AUS) (4)	6
**Michael Holt (ENG)**	**10**
16 & 17 April
Shaun Murphy (ENG) (3)	8
**Anthony McGill (SCO)**	**10**
16 April
**Marco Fu (HKG) (14)**	**10**
Peter Ebdon (ENG)	2
19 & 20 April
**Barry Hawkins (ENG) (11)**	**10**
Zhang Anda (CHN)	5
17 & 18 April
**Ronnie O'Sullivan (ENG) (6)**	**10**
David Gilbert (ENG)	7
19 & 20 April
**Mark Allen (NIR) (7)**	**10**
Mitchell Mann (ENG)	3
20 & 21 April
Joe Perry (ENG) (10)	9
**Kyren Wilson (ENG)**	**10**
17 & 18 April
Michael White (WAL) (15)	7
**Sam Baird (ENG)**	**10**
18 & 19 April
**Mark Selby (ENG) (2)**	**10**
Robert Milkins (ENG)	6

**Second round** Best of 25 frames
21, 22 & 23 April
(England) Ali Carter	11
(Scotland) **Alan McManus**	**13**
23, 24 & 25 April
(England) Ricky Walden (9)	8
(Scotland) **John Higgins (8)**	**13**
24 & 25 April
(England) Judd Trump (5)	10
(China) **Ding Junhui**	**13**
22 & 23 April
(Wales) **Mark Williams (13)**	**13**
(England) Michael Holt	8
21 & 22 April
(Scotland) Anthony McGill	9
(Hong Kong) **Marco Fu (14)**	**13**
23, 24 & 25 April
(England) **Barry Hawkins (11)**	**13**
(England) Ronnie O'Sullivan (6)	12
24 & 25 April
(Northern Ireland) Mark Allen (7)	9
(England) **Kyren Wilson**	**13**
22 & 23 April
(England) Sam Baird	11
(England) **Mark Selby (2)**	**13**

**Quarter-finals**; Best of 25 frames
26 & 27 April
(Scotland) **Alan McManus**	**13**
(Scotland) John Higgins (8)	11
26 & 27 April
(China) **Ding Junhui**	**13**
(Wales) Mark Williams (13)	3
26 & 27 April
(Hong Kong) **Marco Fu (14)**	**13**
(England) Barry Hawkins (11)	11
26 & 27 April
(England) Kyren Wilson	8
(England) **Mark Selby (2)**	**13**

**Semi-finals**; Best of 33 frames
28, 29 & 30 April
(Scotland) Alan McManus	11
(China) **Ding Junhui**	**17**
28, 29 & 30 April
(Hong Kong) Marco Fu (14)	15
(England) **Mark Selby (2)**	**17**

**Final**; Best of 35 frames
1 & 2 May
(China) Ding Junhui	14
(England) **Mark Selby (2)**	**18**

**Final** (Best of 35 frames) Crucible Theatre, Sheffield, 1 & 2 May. Referee: Paul Collier
Ding Junhui; China	14–**18**	**Mark Selby (2)**; England
8–125 (91), 68–70 (Ding 52), 43–101 (76), 0–124 (120), 0–100 (70), 38–77, **68**–47, **107**–14	First session (8 frames); 2–**6**	8–**125** (91), 68–**70** (Ding 52), 43–**101** (76), 0–**124** (120), 0–**100** (70), 38–**77**, 68–47, 107–14
22–73, **92**–30 (76), **103**–1 (103), **93**–49 (89), 1–71, **86**–0 (86), **82**–52 (55), 25–86, 27–67	Second session (9 frames); 7–**10** (**5**–4)	22–**73**, 92–30 (76), 103–1 (103), 93–49 (89), 1–**71**, 86–0 (86), 82–52 (55), 25–**86**, 27–**67**
**121**–7 (89), **61**–56, 11–126 (126), **103**–0 (103), 43–75 (52), 9–118 (68), **69**–1 (52), 11–75 (55)	Third session (8 frames); 11–**14** (4–4)	121–7 (89), 61–56, 11–**126** (126), 103–0 (103), 43–**75** (52), 9–**118** (68), 69–1 (52), 11–**75** (55)
0–103 (57), 60–67 (Ding 60), **87**–0 (73), **108**–0 (70), **103**–0 (103), 11–59, 0–74 (74)	Fourth session (7 out of 10 frames); 14–**18** (3–**4**)	0–**103** (57), 60–**67** (Ding 60), 87–0 (73), 108–0 (70), 103–0 (103), 11–**59**, 0–**74** (74)
103	Highest break	**126**
**3**	Century breaks	2
**13**	50+ breaks	10
(England) **Mark Selby** wins the 2016 Betfred World Snooker Championship

== Qualifying ==
A total of 128 players competed in the qualifying draw. There were three qualifying rounds, reducing the qualifiers to 16, who would go on to play in the final stages. Qualifying took place between 6 and 13 April 2016 at Ponds Forge International Sports Centre. All matches were the best-of-19-frames. The draw for the final stages was made on 14 April.

The players competing in the qualifying included the tour players ranked outside the top 16, players featured as top-ups from the Q School and invited players from the WPBSA. The 16 invited qualifiers were made up of seven players who won or were runner-up in the following events together with 9 players invited based on the European Billiards & Snooker Association (EBSA) Order of Merit. Players invited by the Order of Merit were limited to one player per country.

The seven winners/runners-up were:

- (Hong Kong) Ng On-yee – WLBSA World Snooker Championship winner
- (China) Zhao Xintong – IBSF World Snooker Championship runner-up
- (Wales) Jamie Clarke – IBSF World Under-21 Snooker Championship runner-up
- (Hong Kong) Cheung Ka Wai – IBSF World Under-18 Snooker Championship winner
- (Republic of Ireland) Josh Boileau – EBSA European Under-21 Snooker Championships winner
- (England) Brandon Sargeant – EBSA European Under-21 Snooker Championships runner-up
- (Wales) Tyler Rees – EBSA European Under-18 Snooker Championships winner

The remaining nine invitees were:

- (England) Hammad Miah
- (Wales) Kishan Hirani
- (Poland) Mateusz Baranowski
- (Scotland) Dylan Craig
- (Germany) Lukas Kleckers
- (Republic of Ireland) Brendan O'Donoghue
- (Northern Ireland) Conor McCormack
- (Latvia) Rodion Judin
- (Bulgaria) Bratislav Krustev

Players in bold denote match winners.

**Round 1** Best of 19 frames		**Round 2** Best of 19 frames		**Round 3** Best of 19 frames
**Ding Junhui (CHN)**	**10**
Greg Casey (IRL)	4	**(China) Ding Junhui**	**10**
**Ross Muir (SCO)**	**10**	(Scotland) Ross Muir	1
Sean O'Sullivan (ENG)	5			**(China) Ding Junhui**	**10**
Andrew Higginson (ENG)	9			(England) Nigel Bond	2
**Nigel Bond (ENG)**	**10**	**(England) Nigel Bond**	**10**
**Gary Wilson (ENG)**	**10**	(England) Gary Wilson	6
Leo Fernandez (IRL)	4
Jamie Jones (WAL)	5
**Hamza Akbar (PAK)**	**10**	(Pakistan) Hamza Akbar	3
**Ian Burns (ENG)**	**10**	**(England) Ian Burns**	**10**
Duane Jones (WAL)	8			(England) Ian Burns	2
**Gerard Greene (NIR)**	**10**			**(England) Peter Ebdon**	**10**
Jimmy White (ENG)	9	(Northern Ireland) Gerard Greene	9
**Peter Ebdon (ENG)**	**10**	**(England) Peter Ebdon**	**10**
James Wattana (THA)	6
Ben Woollaston (ENG)	9
**Chris Wakelin (ENG)**	**10**	(England) Chris Wakelin	9
**Anthony Hamilton (ENG)**	**10**	**(England) Anthony Hamilton**	**10**
Sydney Wilson (ENG)	3			(England) Anthony Hamilton	9
**Robbie Williams (ENG)**	**10**			**(England) Robbie Williams**	**10**
Gareth Allen (WAL)	7	**(England) Robbie Williams**	**10**
**Mark Joyce (ENG)**	**10**	(England) Mark Joyce	4
Zak Surety (ENG)	7
**Mike Dunn (ENG)**	**10**
James Cahill (ENG)	7	**(England) Mike Dunn**	**10**
**Li Hang (CHN)**	**10**	(China) Li Hang	9
Lü Chenwei (CHN)	8			(England) Mike Dunn	7
Michael Georgiou (ENG)	6			**(Scotland) Graeme Dott**	**10**
**Noppon Saengkham (THA)**	**10**	(Thailand) Noppon Saengkham	8
**Graeme Dott (SCO)**	**10**	**(Scotland) Graeme Dott**	**10**
Brandon Sargeant (ENG)	8
**Robert Milkins (ENG)**	**10**
Cheung Ka Wai (HKG)	3	**(England) Robert Milkins**	**10**
Joel Walker (ENG)	6	(Scotland) Scott Donaldson	8
**Scott Donaldson (SCO)**	**10**			**(England) Robert Milkins**	**10**
**Kurt Maflin (NOR)**	**10**			(Norway) Kurt Maflin	7
Sanderson Lam (ENG)	8	**(Norway) Kurt Maflin**	**10**
Rod Lawler (ENG)	9	(China) Zhao Xintong	8
**Zhao Xintong (CHN)**	**10**
**Mark King (ENG)**	**10**
Fraser Patrick (SCO)	3	**(England) Mark King**	**10**
**David Grace (ENG)**	**10**	(England) David Grace	7
Brendan O'Donoghue (IRL)	5			(England) Mark King	8
**Peter Lines (ENG)**	**10**			**(England) Michael Holt**	**10**
Ng On-yee (HKG)	1	(England) Peter Lines	7
**Michael Holt (ENG)**	**10**	**(England) Michael Holt**	**10**
Michael Wild (ENG)	6
**Alan McManus (SCO)**	**10**
Michael Wasley (ENG)	5	**(Scotland) Alan McManus**	**10**
**David Morris (IRL)**	**10**	(Republic of Ireland) David Morris	6
Chris Melling (ENG)	5			**(Scotland) Alan McManus**	**10**
**Stuart Carrington (ENG)**	**10**			(England) Jimmy Robertson	2
Hammad Miah (ENG)	9	(England) Stuart Carrington	5
**Jimmy Robertson (ENG)**	**10**	**(England) Jimmy Robertson**	**10**
Tyler Rees (WAL)	0
Tian Pengfei (CHN)	7
**Hossein Vafaei (IRN)**	**10**	(Iran) Hossein Vafaei	7
**Ken Doherty (IRL)**	**10**	**(Republic of Ireland) Ken Doherty**	**10**
Andy Hicks (ENG)	6			(Republic of Ireland) Ken Doherty	6
**Alfie Burden (ENG)**	**10**			**(Wales) Ryan Day**	**10**
Tony Drago (MLT)	7	(England) Alfie Burden	9
**Ryan Day (WAL)**	**10**	**(Wales) Ryan Day**	**10**
Daniel Wells (WAL)	2
**Kyren Wilson (ENG)**	**10**
Jason Weston (ENG)	3	**(England) Kyren Wilson**	**10**
**Martin O'Donnell (ENG)**	**10**	(England) Martin O'Donnell	6
Kuldesh Johal (ENG)	8			**(England) Kyren Wilson**	**10**
Joe Swail (NIR)	7			(Wales) Matthew Stevens	6
**Zhang Yong (CHN)**	**10**	(China) Zhang Yong	3
**Matthew Stevens (WAL)**	**10**	**(Wales) Matthew Stevens**	**10**
Josh Boileau (IRL)	2
**Thepchaiya Un-Nooh (THA)**	**10**
Sunny Akani (THA)	9	**(Thailand) Thepchaiya Un-Nooh**	**10**
Yu Delu (CHN)	9	(England) Paul Davison	7
**Paul Davison (ENG)**	**10**			(Thailand) Thepchaiya Un-Nooh	7
**Craig Steadman (ENG)**	**10**			**(Scotland) Anthony McGill**	**10**
Michael Leslie (SCO)	3	(England) Craig Steadman	9
**Anthony McGill (SCO)**	**10**	**(Scotland) Anthony McGill**	**10**
Hatem Yassen (EGY)	1
**Luca Brecel (BEL)**	**10**
Steven Hallworth (ENG)	8	(Belgium) Luca Brecel	8
**Liam Highfield (ENG)**	**10**	**(England) Liam Highfield**	**10**
Luke Simmonds (ENG)	2			(England) Liam Highfield	9
**Sam Baird (ENG)**	**10**			**(England) Sam Baird**	**10**
Thor Chuan Leong (MYS)	8	**(England) Sam Baird**	**10**
**Tom Ford (ENG)**	**10**	(England) Tom Ford	7
Darryl Hill (IOM)	2
**Jack Lisowski (ENG)**	**10**
Alex Taubman (WAL)	2	**(England) Jack Lisowski**	**10**
**Rory McLeod (ENG)**	**10**	(England) Rory McLeod	5
Lukas Kleckers (GER)	7			(England) Jack Lisowski	7
**Lee Walker (WAL)**	**10**			**(England) David Gilbert**	**10**
Conor McCormack (NIR)	0	(Wales) Lee Walker	2
**David Gilbert (ENG)**	**10**	**(England) David Gilbert**	**10**
Rhys Clark (SCO)	5
**Matthew Selt (ENG)**	**10**
Igor Figueiredo (BRA)	2	(England) Matthew Selt	9
**Mitchell Mann (ENG)**	**10**	**(England) Mitchell Mann**	**10**
Kishan Hirani (WAL)	7			**(England) Mitchell Mann**	**10**
**Robin Hull (FIN)**	**10**			(Thailand) Dechawat Poomjaeng	9
Barry Pinches (ENG)	7	(Finland) Robin Hull	5
**Dechawat Poomjaeng (THA)**	**10**	**(Thailand) Dechawat Poomjaeng**	**10**
Eden Sharav (SCO)	4
**Fergal O'Brien (IRL)**	**10**
Steve Davis (ENG)	4	(Republic of Ireland) Fergal O'Brien	6
**Zhou Yuelong (CHN)**	**10**	**(China) Zhou Yuelong**	**10**
Dylan Craig (SCO)	3			(China) Zhou Yuelong	7
**Zhang Anda (CHN)**	**10**			**(China) Zhang Anda**	**10**
Bratislav Krustev (BUL)	2	**(China) Zhang Anda**	**10**
**Mark Davis (ENG)**	**10**	(England) Mark Davis	5
Adam Duffy (ENG)	7
**Ali Carter (ENG)**	**10**
Mateusz Baranowski (POL)	2	**(England) Ali Carter**	**10**
**Cao Yupeng (CHN)**	**10**	(China) Cao Yupeng	8
Rodion Judin (LAT)	0			**(England) Ali Carter**	**10**
**Oliver Lines (ENG)**	**10**			(Wales) Dominic Dale	6
Lu Ning (CHN)	5	(England) Oliver Lines	6
**Dominic Dale (WAL)**	**10**	**(Wales) Dominic Dale**	**10**
Ian Glover (ENG)	6
**Xiao Guodong (CHN)**	**10**
Allan Taylor (ENG)	6	**(China) Xiao Guodong**	**10**
Jamie Burnett (SCO)	9	(Wales) Jamie Clarke	8
**Jamie Clarke (WAL)**	**10**			(China) Xiao Guodong	6
**Jamie Cope (ENG)**	**10**			**(China) Liang Wenbo**	**10**
Ashley Hugill (ENG)	4	(England) Jamie Cope	5
**Liang Wenbo (CHN)**	**10**	**(China) Liang Wenbo**	**10**
Joe O'Connor (ENG)	2

== Century breaks ==
=== Televised stage centuries ===
There were 86 century breaks made by 24 players in the televised stage of the World Championship, equalling the record set the year before. For every century break made during the 17-day championship in Sheffield, the title sponsor, Betfred, donated £200 to the Bluebell Wood Children's Hospice. The donation was rounded up to £25,000 as the goal of 70 centuries was achieved. Junhui made 15 centuries, one short of the record of 16 set by Hendry in 2002.

- 143, 130, 129, 103 – Kyren Wilson
- 141, 102 – Barry Hawkins
- 140, 115, 109 – Michael Holt
- 139, 124, 118, 103, 101 – Ronnie O'Sullivan
- 138, 136, 135, 114, 111, 108, 102, 100, 100 – Marco Fu
- 138, 132, 131, 128, 123, 113, 112, 110, 109, 103, 103, 103, 100, 100, 100 – Ding Junhui
- 136, 128, 125, 119, 114, 107 – Alan McManus
- 134, 133, 132, 126, 125, 120, 115, 101, 101 – Mark Selby
- 125 – David Gilbert
- 122, 104, 103, 103 – Mark Allen
- 121, 107, 105, 105, 101, 100 – John Higgins
- 119, 117 – Anthony McGill
- 117, 107 – Liang Wenbo
- 113 – Stuart Bingham
- 111 – Martin Gould
- 109, 105 – Shaun Murphy
- 108, 103, 100 – Sam Baird
- 107, 101 – Neil Robertson
- 106, 106 – Judd Trump
- 104 – Robbie Williams
- 103, 102, 100 – Ali Carter
- 102 – Mark Williams
- 102 – Michael White
- 102 – Ricky Walden

=== Qualifying stage centuries ===
There were 132 century breaks made by 63 players in the qualifying stage of the World Championship.

- 144, 140, 102 – Thepchaiya Un-Nooh
- 142 – Peter Lines
- 140, 137, 106 – Ding Junhui
- 140, 137, 104 – Zhou Yuelong
- 139, 120, 117, 104 – Liam Highfield
- 139, 104 – Oliver Lines
- 138, 130, 111, 111, 101 – Ali Carter
- 138, 110 – Hossein Vafaei
- 138, 108, 104, 101 – Liang Wenbo
- 136, 131, 119, 104 – Ryan Day
- 136, 122, 118, 115, 106 – Jimmy Robertson
- 135 – Andrew Higginson
- 134, 121, 114 – Dechawat Poomjaeng
- 134, 118, 117, 106, 104 – Noppon Saengkham
- 134, 110, 102 – Kurt Maflin
- 134, 101 – Lü Chenwei
- 133, 119, 115, 114 – David Gilbert
- 133, 100 – Xiao Guodong
- 131, 116 – Kyren Wilson
- 131 – Ben Woollaston
- 130, 108 – Mark King
- 130 – Mark Davis
- 128 – Lee Walker
- 127, 105, 100 – Mitchell Mann
- 127 – Daniel Wells
- 125 – Jamie Jones
- 123 – Zhang Yong
- 123 – Zhao Xintong
- 122, 104 – Scott Donaldson
- 121, 103 – Graeme Dott
- 121, 100 – Kishan Hirani
- 120, 108 – Li Hang
- 120, 107, 103, 102 – Jack Lisowski
- 116, 104, 104, 100 – Anthony Hamilton
- 115, 105, 100 – Stuart Carrington
- 114, 110 – Matthew Stevens
- 113, 111 – Zhang Anda
- 112, 109 – Alfie Burden
- 112, 106, 103, 100 – Robert Milkins
- 111 – James Wattana
- 110, 107 – David Morris
- 110 – Ian Glover
- 109, 106 – Ken Doherty
- 109, 102, 101 – Anthony McGill
- 108, 100, 100 – Sam Baird
- 108 – Chris Melling
- 108 – Matthew Selt
- 108 – Rory McLeod
- 107 – Chris Wakelin
- 107 – Fergal O'Brien
- 107 – Thor Chuan Leong
- 106, 105 – Robbie Williams
- 106 – Mark Joyce
- 106 – Michael Georgiou
- 105, 104, 103 – Tom Ford
- 105 – Sunny Akani
- 105 – Allan Taylor
- 105 – Joe Swail
- 105 – Peter Ebdon
- 104 – Gary Wilson
- 102 – Eden Sharav
- 102 – Luca Brecel
- 101 – Gareth Allen
