= 2016 EBSA European Under-21 Snooker Championship =

EBSA European Under-21 Snooker Championship
Tournament information
- Dates: 7–13 February 2016
- Venue: Haston City Centre
- City: Wrocław
- Country: Poland
- Organisation: EBSA
- Winner's share: €1,600
- Highest break: (Republic of Ireland) Josh Boileau (130)

Final
- Champion: (Republic of Ireland) Josh Boileau
- Runner-up: (England) Brandon Sargeant
- Score: 6–1

The 2016 EBSA European Under-21 Snooker Championship is an amateur snooker tournament. It took place from 7 February to 13 February 2016 in Wrocław, Poland. It is the 20th edition of the EBSA European Under-21 Snooker Championships and also doubles as a qualification event for the World Snooker Tour.

The tournament was won by the 2014 runner-up Josh Boileau of Ireland who defeated England's Brandon Sargeant 6–1 in the final to win the championships. As a result, he was given a two-year card on the professional World Snooker Tour for the 2016/2017 and 2017/2018 seasons.

== Results ==
=== Round 1 ===
Best of 7 frames

| 33 | (France) Niel Vincent | 4–0 | 32 | (France) Brian Ochoiski |
| 17 | (Germany) Simon Lichtenberg | 4–0 | 48 | (Scotland) Aaron Graham |
| 41 | (Wales) Rhys Thomas | 4–1 | 24 | (France) Alexis Callewaert |
| 25 | (Wales) Jackson Page | 3–4 | 40 | (France) Yannick Tarillon |
| 37 | (Sweden) Arpat Pulat | 4–2 | 28 | (Russia) Mikhail Terekhov |
| 21 | (England) Brandon Sargeant | 4–0 | 44 | (Romania) Vladu Mihai |
| 45 | (Northern Ireland) Conor Morgan | 4–0 | 20 | (Sweden) Benjamin McCabe |
| 29 | (Romania) Tudor Popescu | 0–4 | 36 | (Republic of Ireland) Adam Fitzgerald |

| 35 | (Netherlands) Tim De Ruyter | 3–4 | 30 | (Poland) Paweł Rogoza |
| 19 | (Poland) Kacper Filipiak | 4–0 | 46 | (Northern Ireland) Daniel Nixon |
| 43 | (Romania) Andrei Orzan | 2–4 | 22 | (Scotland) Chris Totten |
| 27 | (Israel) Maor Shalom | 4–1 | 38 | (Bulgaria) Spasian Spasov |
| 39 | (Poland) Patryk Masłowski | 4–0 | 26 | (Malta) Isaac Borg |
| 23 | (England) Louis Heathcote | 4–0 | 42 | (Sweden) Belan Sharif |
| 47 | (Slovakia) Patrik Sedlak | 1–4 | 18 | (Israel) Amir Nardeia |
| 31 | (Austria) Markus Pfistermüller | 2–4 | 34 | (Estonia) Andres Petrov |

Round 2 Best of 7 frames
1 | (England) Ashley Carty | 4
33 | (France) Niel Vincent | 0
17 | (Germany) Simon Lichtenberg | 3
16 | (Wales) Callum Lloyd | 4
9 | (Republic of Ireland) Charlie Sweeney | 4
41 | (Wales) Rhys Thomas | 3
40 | (France) Yannick Tarillon | 4
8 | (Russia) Ivan Kakovsky | 1
5 | (England) William Lemons | 4
37 | (Sweden) Arpat Pulat | 2
21 | (England) Brandon Sargeant | 4
12 | (Belgium) Jeff Jacobs | 2
13 | (Wales) Tyler Rees | 4
45 | (Northern Ireland) Conor Morgan | 0
36 | (Republic of Ireland) Adam Fitzgerald | 2
4 | (Scotland) Dylan Craig | 4
3 | (England) Joe O'Connor | 4
30 | (Poland) Paweł Rogoza | 2
19 | (Poland) Kacper Filipiak | 4
14 | (Poland) Mateusz Baranowski | 2
11 | (Latvia) Rodion Judin | 4
22 | (Scotland) Chris Totten | 2
27 | (Israel) Maor Shalom | 1
6 | (Germany) Lukas Kleckers | 4
7 | (Republic of Ireland) Josh Boileau | 4
39 | (Poland) Patryk Masłowski | 1
23 | (England) Louis Heathcote | 2
10 | (Switzerland) Alexander Ursenbacher | 4
15 | (Malta) Chris Peplow | 4
18 | (Israel) Amir Nardeia | 1
34 | (Estonia) Andres Petrov | 4
2 | (Malta) Brian Cini | 2

Round 3 Best of 7 frames
1 | (England) Ashley Carty | 4
16 | (Wales) Callum Lloyd | 2
9 | (Republic of Ireland) Charlie Sweeney | 1
40 | (France) Yannick Tarillon | 4
5 | (England) William Lemons | 3
21 | (England) Brandon Sargeant | 4
13 | (Wales) Tyler Rees | 4
4 | (Scotland) Dylan Craig | 3
3 | (England) Joe O'Connor | 4
19 | (Poland) Kacper Filipiak | 1
11 | (Latvia) Rodion Judin | 0
6 | (Germany) Lukas Kleckers | 4
7 | (Republic of Ireland) Josh Boileau | 4
10 | (Switzerland) Alexander Ursenbacher | 3
15 | (Malta) Chris Peplow | 1
34 | (Estonia) Andres Petrov | 4

Quarter-Finals; Best of 9 frames
1 | (England) Ashley Carty | 5
40 | (France) Yannick Tarillon | 1
21 | (England) Brandon Sargeant | 5
13 | (Wales) Tyler Rees | 4
3 | (England) Joe O'Connor | 5
6 | (Germany) Lukas Kleckers | 4
7 | (Republic of Ireland) Josh Boileau | 5
34 | (Estonia) Andres Petrov | 2

Semi-Finals; Best of 9 frames
1 | (England) Ashley Carty | 1
21 | (England) Brandon Sargeant | 5
3 | (England) Joe O'Connor | 4
7 | (Republic of Ireland) Josh Boileau | 5

Final; Best of 11 frames
21 | (England) Brandon Sargeant | 1
7 | (Republic of Ireland) Josh Boileau | 6
