= 2017 China Championship =

2017 Evergrande China Championship
Tournament information
- Dates: 16–22 August 2017
- Venue: Guangzhou Sport University
- City: Guangzhou
- Country: China
- Organisation: World Snooker
- Format: Ranking event
- Total prize fund: £700,000
- Winner's share: £150,000
- Highest break: Thepchaiya Un-Nooh (THA) (144)

Final
- Champion: Luca Brecel (BEL)
- Runner-up: Shaun Murphy (ENG)
- Score: 10–5

The 2017 China Championship (officially the 2017 Evergrande China Championship) was a professional ranking snooker tournament that took place between 16 and 22 August 2017 in China. It was the second ranking event of the 2017/2018 season.

This was the first time the event was a ranking tournament. John Higgins was the defending champion, but was knocked out in the second round by Tom Ford.

Luca Brecel won his first ranking tournament, beating Shaun Murphy 10–5 in the final. He became the first player from mainland Europe to win a ranking event.

== Prize fund ==
The breakdown of prize money for this year is shown below:

- Winner: £150,000
- Runner-up: £75,000
- Semi-final: £32,000
- Quarter-final: £18,000
- Last 16: £12,000
- Last 32: £7,000
- Last 64: £4,000
- Televised highest break: £3,000
- Total: £700,000

The "rolling 147 prize" for a maximum break stood at £15,000

== Main draw ==
Last 64; Best of 9 frames
(England) Mark Selby	5
(Thailand) Noppon Saengkham	1
(China) Zhou Yuelong	5
(China) Chen Zifan	4
(England) Martin Gould	5
(England) Andrew Higginson	2
(Scotland) Anthony McGill	2
(England) Mark Joyce	5
(England) Rory McLeod	1
(Scotland) Stephen Maguire	5
(China) Yan Bingtao	5
(England) Stuart Bingham	3
(England) Peter Ebdon	3
(England) Anthony Hamilton	5
(Republic of Ireland) Ken Doherty	4
(England) Shaun Murphy	5
(England) Barry Hawkins	5
(England) Oliver Lines	2
(England) Ben Woollaston	4
(England) Mark Davis	5
(England) Ali Carter	5
(India) Aditya Mehta	4
(Wales) Ian Preece	4
(England) David Grace	5
(Republic of Ireland) Fergal O'Brien	5
(England) Mark King	3
(Norway) Kurt Maflin	5
(Cyprus) Michael Georgiou	0
(England) Elliot Slessor	3
(Scotland) Alan McManus	5
(England) Alfie Burden	2
(China) Ding Junhui	5
(England) Judd Trump	5
(Wales) Daniel Wells	2
(Scotland) Graeme Dott	5
(England) Robert Milkins	3
(England) Ronnie O'Sullivan	5
(England) Sam Baird	2
(England) David Gilbert	5
(England) Stuart Carrington	4
(England) Mike Dunn	5
(England) Joe Perry	1
(England) Allan Taylor	5
(England) Ian Burns	4
(England) Jimmy Robertson	2
(Belgium) Luca Brecel	5
(Iran) Hossein Vafaei	3
(Hong Kong) Marco Fu	5
(Australia) Neil Robertson	4
(China) Li Hang	5
(Wales) Michael White	5
(China) Xiao Guodong	3
(Northern Ireland) Mark Allen	4
(Wales) Matthew Stevens	5
(England) Michael Holt	2
(Thailand) Thepchaiya Un-Nooh	5
(China) Cao Yupeng	3
(Wales) Ryan Day	5
(China) Tian Pengfei	2
(Wales) Mark Williams	5
(England) Matthew Selt	1
(England) Tom Ford	5
(England) Chris Wakelin	2
(Scotland) John Higgins	5

Last 32; Best of 9 frames
(England) Mark Selby	4
(China) Zhou Yuelong	5
(England) Martin Gould	5
(England) Mark Joyce	2
(Scotland) Stephen Maguire	5
(China) Yan Bingtao	1
(England) Anthony Hamilton (Note: Hamilton retired at 0–1 due to a neck injury)	0
(England) Shaun Murphy	5
(England) Barry Hawkins	3
(England) Mark Davis	5
(England) Ali Carter	5
(England) David Grace	4
(Republic of Ireland) Fergal O'Brien	5
(Norway) Kurt Maflin	2
(Scotland) Alan McManus	5
(China) Ding Junhui	0
(England) Judd Trump	3
(Scotland) Graeme Dott	5
(England) Ronnie O'Sullivan	5
(England) David Gilbert	3
(England) Mike Dunn	5
(England) Allan Taylor	4
(Belgium) Luca Brecel	5
(Hong Kong) Marco Fu	2
(China) Li Hang	5
(Wales) Michael White	4
(Wales) Matthew Stevens	5
(Thailand) Thepchaiya Un-Nooh	2
(Wales) Ryan Day	0
(Wales) Mark Williams	5
(England) Tom Ford	5
(Scotland) John Higgins	2

Last 16; Best of 9 frames
(China) Zhou Yuelong	5
(England) Martin Gould	2
(Scotland) Stephen Maguire	0
(England) Shaun Murphy	5
(England) Mark Davis	1
(England) Ali Carter	5
(Republic of Ireland) Fergal O'Brien	5
(Scotland) Alan McManus	4
(Scotland) Graeme Dott	0
(England) Ronnie O'Sullivan	5
(England) Mike Dunn	3
(Belgium) Luca Brecel	5
(China) Li Hang	5
(Wales) Matthew Stevens	4
(Wales) Mark Williams	5
(England) Tom Ford	3

Quarter-finals; Best of 9 frames
(China) Zhou Yuelong	2
(England) Shaun Murphy	5
(England) Ali Carter	5
(Republic of Ireland) Fergal O'Brien	2
(England) Ronnie O'Sullivan	4
(Belgium) Luca Brecel	5
(China) Li Hang	5
(Wales) Mark Williams	3

Semi-finals; Best of 11 frames
(England) Shaun Murphy	6
(England) Ali Carter	4
(Belgium) Luca Brecel	6
(China) Li Hang	5

== Final ==
Final: Best of 19 frames. Referee: Deng Shihao. Guangzhou Sports University, Guangzhou, China, 22 August 2017.
Shaun Murphy; England	5–10	Luca Brecel; Belgium
Afternoon: 68–2 (55), 78–31 (68), 15–68 (64), 107–0 (107), 49–63, 19–56, 53–77 (Murphy 53), 5–78 (78), 58–54; Evening: 0–66, 30–62, 109–1 (77), 52–53, 30–70, 37–61
107	Highest break	78
1	Century breaks	0
5	50+ breaks	2

== Qualifying ==
These matches were held between 3 and 6 June 2017 at the Preston Guild Hall in Preston, England. All matches were the best of 9 frames.

Mark Selby (ENG)	5–1 (Note: Match held over and played in Guangzhou)	Luo Honghao (CHN) (Note: Wildcard player)
Noppon Saengkham (THA)	5–4	Rhys Clark (SCO)
Zhou Yuelong (CHN)	5–3	Christopher Keogan (ENG)
Dominic Dale (WAL)	3–5	Chen Zifan (CHN)
Martin Gould (ENG)	5–1	Adam Duffy (ENG)
Andrew Higginson (ENG)	5–1	Hu Hao (CHN)
Anthony McGill (SCO)	5–3	Craig Steadman (ENG)
Mark Joyce (ENG)	5–3	Rod Lawler (ENG)
Rory McLeod (ENG)	5–3	Chen Zhe (CHN)
Stephen Maguire (SCO)	5–1	Jamie Curtis-Barrett (ENG)
Yan Bingtao (CHN)	5–1	Wang Yuchen (CHN)
Stuart Bingham (ENG)	5–0	Billy Joe Castle (ENG)
Peter Ebdon (ENG)	5–3	Nigel Bond (ENG)
Anthony Hamilton (ENG)	5–2	Robin Hull (FIN)
Gary Wilson (ENG)	1–5	Ken Doherty (IRL)
Shaun Murphy (ENG)	5–2	Zhang Anda (CHN)
Barry Hawkins (ENG)	5–4	John Astley (ENG)
Oliver Lines (ENG)	5–2	Duane Jones (WAL)
Ben Woollaston (ENG)	5–3	Lukas Kleckers (GER)
Mark Davis (ENG)	5–2	Alexander Ursenbacher (SUI)
Ali Carter (ENG)	5–2	Ross Muir (SCO)
Robbie Williams (ENG)	4–5	Aditya Mehta (IND)
Ricky Walden (ENG)	0–5	Ian Preece (WAL)
David Grace (ENG)	5–4	Mei Xiwen (CHN)
Fergal O'Brien (IRL)	5–3	Sam Craigie (ENG)
Mark King (ENG)	w/o–w/d	Li Yuan (CHN)
Kurt Maflin (NOR)	5–3	Thor Chuan Leong (MAS)
Kyren Wilson (ENG)	1–5	Michael Georgiou (CYP)
Jamie Jones (WAL)	0–5	Elliot Slessor (ENG)
Alan McManus (SCO)	5–4	Hammad Miah (ENG)
Alfie Burden (ENG)	5–2	Paul Davison (ENG)
Ding Junhui (CHN)	5–1	Niu Zhuang (CHN)

Judd Trump (ENG)	5–1	Xu Si (CHN)
Daniel Wells (WAL)	5–2	Ma Chunmao (CHN)
Graeme Dott (SCO)	w/o–w/d	Liam Highfield (ENG)
Robert Milkins (ENG)	5–2	Zhao Xintong (CHN)
Ronnie O'Sullivan (ENG)	w/o–w/d	Zhang Yong (CHN)
Sam Baird (ENG)	5–2	Josh Boileau (IRL)
David Gilbert (ENG)	5–4	Mitchell Mann (ENG)
Stuart Carrington (ENG)	5–1	Scott Donaldson (SCO)
Mike Dunn (ENG)	5–2	Alex Borg (MLT)
Joe Perry (ENG)	5–1	Eden Sharav (SCO)
Jack Lisowski (ENG)	3–5	Allan Taylor (ENG)
Liang Wenbo (CHN)	3–5	Ian Burns (ENG)
Jimmy Robertson (ENG)	5–0	David John (WAL)
Luca Brecel (BEL)	5–2	Sean O'Sullivan (ENG)
Hossein Vafaei (IRN)	5–0	Soheil Vahedi (IRN)
Marco Fu (HKG)	5–0	Sanderson Lam (ENG)
Neil Robertson (AUS)	5–2	Gerard Greene (NIR)
Li Hang (CHN)	5–3	Joe Swail (NIR)
Michael White (WAL)	5–3	Martin O'Donnell (ENG)
Xiao Guodong (CHN)	5–4	Hamza Akbar (PAK)
Mark Allen (NIR)	5–3	Lee Walker (WAL)
Matthew Stevens (WAL)	5–2	Ashley Hugill (ENG)
Michael Holt (ENG)	5–0	Kurt Dunham (AUS)
Thepchaiya Un-Nooh (THA)	5–4	Chris Totten (SCO)
Yu Delu (CHN)	3–5	Cao Yupeng (CHN)
Ryan Day (WAL)	5–0	Jimmy White (ENG)
Tian Pengfei (CHN)	5–2	Fan Zhengyi (CHN)
Mark Williams (WAL)	5–3	Jak Jones (WAL)
Matthew Selt (ENG)	5–4	Peter Lines (ENG)
Tom Ford (ENG)	5–3	Yuan Sijun (CHN)
Chris Wakelin (ENG)	5–3	Fang Xiongman (CHN)
John Higgins (SCO)	5–0	Lyu Haotian (CHN)

== Century breaks ==
=== Qualifying stage centuries ===
Total: 29

- 138 – Zhang Anda
- 136 – Stuart Carrington
- 134, 124 – Marco Fu
- 120 – David Gilbert
- 115 – Mark Allen
- 115 – Rhys Clark
- 111 – Anthony McGill
- 110 – Chris Wakelin
- 110 – Mark Williams
- 109 – Shaun Murphy
- 107 – Anthony Hamilton
- 105 – Joe Perry
- 104 – Barry Hawkins
- 104 – Xiao Guodong
- 103 – Ali Carter
- 103 – Jimmy Robertson
- 103 – Chen Zifan
- 102 – Mark Davis
- 102 – Ken Doherty
- 102 – Sam Craigie
- 101 – Peter Ebdon
- 101 – Stephen Maguire
- 100 – Judd Trump
- 100 – Ian Preece
- 100 – Gerard Greene
- 100 – Thepchaiya Un-Nooh
- 100 – Hossein Vafaei
- 100 – Chris Totten

=== Televised stage centuries ===
Total: 40

- 144 – Thepchaiya Un-Nooh
- 139, 133, 103 – Li Hang
- 139, 130, 124, 100 – Ronnie O'Sullivan
- 137 – Ryan Day
- 134 – Mark Joyce
- 133, 127, 112 – Ali Carter
- 133 – Tom Ford
- 130, 120 – Stuart Carrington
- 129, 119 – John Higgins
- 128, 105, 104 – Judd Trump
- 128 – Ding Junhui
- 124, 104 – Zhou Yuelong
- 124 – Fergal O'Brien
- 123 – Mark Selby
- 122 – Yan Bingtao
- 115 – Mark Williams
- 110, 107, 103 – Luca Brecel
- 110 – Barry Hawkins
- 109 – Mark Davis
- 107, 104, 100 – Shaun Murphy
- 104 – Michael White
- 102 – Marco Fu
- 102 – Liang Wenbo
- 100 – Alfie Burden
