= 2004 EBSA European Under-19 Snooker Championship =

EBSA European Under-19 Snooker Championships
Tournament information
- Dates: 5–8 April 2004
- City: Wellingborough
- Country: England
- Organisation: EBSA
- Highest break: (Wales) Jamie Jones (139)

Final
- Champion: (Wales) Jamie Jones
- Runner-up: (Northern Ireland) Mark Allen
- Score: 6–3

The 2004 EBSA European Under-19 Snooker Championship was an amateur snooker tournament that took place from 5 April to 8 April 2004 in Wellingborough, England. It was the 8th edition of the EBSA European Under-19 Snooker Championships. The tournament was won by Welshman Jamie Jones who defeated Mark Allen 6–3 in the final.

== Results ==
Round 1 Best of 7 frames
1	(England) Lee Page	4
16	(Northern Ireland) Jamie McArdle	1
9	(Scotland) Mark Owens	3
8	(England) Chris Norbury	4
5	(England) Jamie O'Neill	3
12	(Republic of Ireland) John Connors	4
13	(Scotland) Michael Collumb	0
4	(Northern Ireland) Mark Allen	4
3	(Wales) Jamie Jones	4
14	(Republic of Ireland) Jason Waters	0
10	(Germany) Patrick Einsle	4
6	(England) Gary Wilson	1
7	(Republic of Ireland) David Morris	4
10	(Northern Ireland) Jordan Brown	3
15	(England) Linh Tieu	2
2	(England) Judd Trump	4

Quarter-Finals; Best of 9 frames
1	(England) Lee Page	4
8	(England) Chris Norbury	5
12	(Republic of Ireland) John Connors	1
4	(Northern Ireland) Mark Allen	5
3	(Wales) Jamie Jones	5
10	(Germany) Patrick Einsle	4
7	(Republic of Ireland) David Morris	3
2	(England) Judd Trump	5

Semi-Finals; Best of 9 frames
8	(England) Chris Norbury	1
4	(Northern Ireland) Mark Allen	5
3	(Wales) Jamie Jones	5
2	(England) Judd Trump	1

Final; Best of 11 frames
4	(Northern Ireland) Mark Allen	3
3	(Wales) Jamie Jones	6
