= 2014 International Championship =

Tournament information
- Dates: 26 October – 2 November 2014
- Venue: Sichuan International Tennis Center
- City: Chengdu
- Country: China
- Organisation: World Snooker
- Format: Ranking event
- Total prize fund: £625,000
- Winner's share: £125,000
- Highest break: Mitchell Mann (ENG) (142)

Final
- Champion: Ricky Walden (ENG)
- Runner-up: Mark Allen (NIR)
- Score: 10–7

The 2014 International Championship was a professional ranking snooker tournament that took place between 26 October and 2 November 2014 at the Sichuan International Tennis Center in Chengdu, China. It was the fourth ranking event of the 2014/2015 season.

Ding Junhui was the defending champion, but he lost 5–6 against amateur Wang Zepeng in the qualifying round.

Ricky Walden won his third ranking title by defeating Mark Allen 10–7 in the final.

== Prize fund ==
The breakdown of prize money for this year is shown below:

- Winner: £125,000
- Runner-up: £65,000
- Semi-final: £30,000
- Quarter-final: £17,500
- Last 16: £12,000
- Last 32: £7,000
- Last 64: £3,000
- Televised highest break: £1,000
- Total: £625,000

== Wildcard round ==
These matches were played in Chengdu on 26 October 2014.

Match		Score	
WC1	Mitchell Mann (ENG)	6–1	Niu Zhuang (CHN)
WC2	Jamie Jones (WAL)	5–6	Zhao Xintong (CHN)
WC3	Joe Swail (NIR)	6–4	Yan Bingtao (CHN)
WC4	Oliver Lines (ENG)	6–3	Huang Jiahao (CHN)

== Main draw ==
Last 64; Best of 11 frames
(China) Wang Zepeng	5
(England) Mitchell Mann	6
(India) Aditya Mehta	0
(Wales) Michael White	6
(Wales) Dominic Dale	5
(England) Ian Burns	6
(England) Craig Steadman	6
(Scotland) Graeme Dott	1
(England) Stuart Bingham	6
(England) Robbie Williams	4
(England) Mark Joyce	5
(Wales) Ryan Day	6
(England) Martin Gould	6
(England) Joel Walker	4
(England) Nigel Bond	0
(Northern Ireland) Mark Allen	6
(England) Barry Hawkins	6
(England) Jimmy White	4
(England) Oliver Brown	1
(Wales) Mark Williams	6
(England) Sam Baird	6
(England) Kyren Wilson	2
(Thailand) Dechawat Poomjaeng	2
(England) Mark Davis	6
(Scotland) John Higgins	1
(China) Li Hang	6
(China) Zhao Xintong	6
(Norway) Kurt Maflin	3
(Scotland) Alan McManus	4
(Scotland) Anthony McGill	6
(England) Ben Woollaston	4
(England) Ronnie O'Sullivan	6
(Australia) Neil Robertson	6
(England) Matthew Selt	3
(Northern Ireland) Joe Swail	6
(England) Andrew Higginson	2
(China) Zhou Yuelong	6
(England) Chris Melling	1
(Republic of Ireland) David Morris	3
(England) Ricky Walden	6
(England) Joe Perry	6
(England) Mike Dunn	3
(Wales) Andrew Pagett	1
(England) Peter Ebdon	6
(Wales) Matthew Stevens	1
(Scotland) Jamie Burnett	6
(England) Jimmy Robertson	5
(England) Judd Trump	6
(England) Shaun Murphy	6
(China) Yu Delu	1
(England) Barry Pinches	2
(England) Robert Milkins	6
(China) Xiao Guodong	6
(Scotland) Eden Sharav	2
(Thailand) Noppon Saengkham	6
(Scotland) Stephen Maguire	5
(Hong Kong) Marco Fu	6
(England) Liam Highfield	4
(England) David Gilbert	6
(England) Zak Surety	4
(Republic of Ireland) Fergal O'Brien	6
(Thailand) Thepchaiya Un-Nooh	5
(England) Rod Lawler	6
(England) Oliver Lines	3

Last 32; Best of 11 frames
(England) Mitchell Mann	4
(Wales) Michael White	6
(England) Ian Burns	6
(England) Craig Steadman	3
(England) Stuart Bingham	6
(Wales) Ryan Day	3
(England) Martin Gould	4
(Northern Ireland) Mark Allen	6
(England) Barry Hawkins	2
(Wales) Mark Williams	6
(England) Sam Baird	6
(England) Mark Davis	5
(China) Li Hang	6
(China) Zhao Xintong	1
(Scotland) Anthony McGill	1
(England) Ronnie O'Sullivan	6
(Australia) Neil Robertson	5
(Northern Ireland) Joe Swail	6
(China) Zhou Yuelong	5
(England) Ricky Walden	6
(England) Joe Perry	1
(England) Peter Ebdon	6
(Scotland) Jamie Burnett	6
(England) Judd Trump	5
(England) Shaun Murphy	1
(England) Robert Milkins	6
(China) Xiao Guodong	6
(Thailand) Noppon Saengkham	5
(Hong Kong) Marco Fu	6
(England) David Gilbert	5
(Republic of Ireland) Fergal O'Brien	1
(England) Rod Lawler	6

Last 16; Best of 11 frames
(Wales) Michael White	6
(England) Ian Burns	2
(England) Stuart Bingham	4
(Northern Ireland) Mark Allen	6
(Wales) Mark Williams	6
(England) Sam Baird	4
(China) Li Hang	1
(England) Ronnie O'Sullivan	6
(Northern Ireland) Joe Swail	4
(England) Ricky Walden	6
(England) Peter Ebdon	2
(Scotland) Jamie Burnett	6
(England) Robert Milkins	6
(China) Xiao Guodong	4
(Hong Kong) Marco Fu	6
(England) Rod Lawler	4

Quarter-finals; Best of 11 frames
(Wales) Michael White	3
(Northern Ireland) Mark Allen	6
(Wales) Mark Williams	6
(England) Ronnie O'Sullivan	5
(England) Ricky Walden	6
(Scotland) Jamie Burnett	1
(England) Robert Milkins	6
(Hong Kong) Marco Fu	5

Semi-finals; Best of 17 frames
(Northern Ireland) Mark Allen	9
(Wales) Mark Williams	8
(England) Ricky Walden	9
(England) Robert Milkins	2

Final; Best of 19 frames
(Northern Ireland) Mark Allen	7
(England) Ricky Walden	10

== Final ==
Final: Best of 19 frames. Referee: Jan Verhaas. Sichuan International Tennis Center, Chengdu, China, 2 November 2014.
Mark Allen; Northern Ireland	7–10	Ricky Walden; England
Afternoon: 1–109 (59), 85–1, 25–69 (64), 52–57, 76–48, 113–1 (113), 49–67, 67–18, 71–31 (52); Evening: 0–100, 44–79, 4–85 (85), 69–1 (68), 88–4 (74), 0–85 (85), 0–103 (103), 6–116 (54, 62)
113	Highest break	103
1	Century breaks	1
4	50+ breaks	7

== Qualifying ==
These matches took place between 22 and 25 September 2014 at the Barnsley Metrodome in Barnsley, England. All matches were best of 11 frames.

(China) Ding Junhui	5–6	(China) Wang Zepeng
(England) Peter Lines	5–6	(England) Mitchell Mann
(India) Aditya Mehta	6–3	(Thailand) James Wattana
(Wales) Michael White	6–4	(England) Sean O'Sullivan
(Wales) Dominic Dale	6–3	(Australia) Vinnie Calabrese
(England) Jack Lisowski	2–6	(England) Ian Burns
(China) Cao Yupeng	4–6	(England) Craig Steadman
(Scotland) Graeme Dott	6–1	(England) Lee Page
(England) Stuart Bingham	6–4	(England) Michael Wasley
(England) Robbie Williams	6–2	(Qatar) Ahmed Saif
(England) Mark Joyce	6–4	(China) Lu Ning
(Wales) Ryan Day	6–5	(China) Lyu Haotian
(England) Martin Gould	6–4	(China) Cao Xinlong
(Republic of Ireland) Ken Doherty	4–6	(England) Joel Walker
(England) Nigel Bond	6–1	(England) Joe O'Connor
(Northern Ireland) Mark Allen	6–4	(England) Nico Elton
(England) Barry Hawkins	6–0	(Thailand) Ratchayothin Yotharuck
(England) Jimmy White	6–5	(England) Alex Davies
(England) Jamie Cope	3–6	(England) Oliver Brown
(Wales) Mark Williams	6–2	(Scotland) Scott Donaldson
(England) Michael Holt	4–6	(England) Sam Baird
(England) Kyren Wilson	6–1	(Scotland) Ross Muir
(Thailand) Dechawat Poomjaeng	6–2	(England) Steven Hallworth
(England) Mark Davis	6–2	(Wales) Lee Walker
(Scotland) John Higgins	6–2	(England) Stuart Carrington
(England) Gary Wilson	5–6	(China) Li Hang
(Wales) Jamie Jones	6–5	(China) Zhang Anda
(Norway) Kurt Maflin	6–5	(England) Elliot Slessor
(Scotland) Alan McManus	6–2	(England) Michael Georgiou
(Scotland) Anthony McGill	6–2	(England) Ashley Carty
(England) Ben Woollaston	6–3	(England) Sydney Wilson
(England) Ronnie O'Sullivan	6–3	(England) James Cahill

(Australia) Neil Robertson	6–5	(Malta) Alex Borg
(England) Matthew Selt	6–2	(Canada) Alex Pagulayan
(England) Tom Ford	3–6	(Northern Ireland) Joe Swail
(England) Andrew Higginson	6–2	(England) Chris Wakelin
(China) Liang Wenbo	2–6	(China) Zhou Yuelong
(Belgium) Luca Brecel	5–6	(England) Chris Melling
(Republic of Ireland) David Morris	6–3	(England) John Astley
(England) Ricky Walden	6–0	(China) Lu Chenwei
(England) Joe Perry	6–0	(England) Chris Norbury
(England) Mike Dunn	6–2	(England) Matthew Day
(England) Rory McLeod	3–6	(Wales) Andrew Pagett
(England) Peter Ebdon	6–2	(England) David Grace
(Wales) Matthew Stevens	6–3	(Scotland) Michael Leslie
(Scotland) Jamie Burnett	6–0	(Republic of Ireland) John Sutton
(England) Jimmy Robertson	6–0	(England) Hammad Miah
(England) Judd Trump	6–0	(England) Ian Glover
(England) Shaun Murphy	6–1	(England) Allan Taylor
(China) Yu Delu	6–3	(England) Brandon Sargeant
(Scotland) Marcus Campbell	2–6	(England) Barry Pinches
(England) Robert Milkins	6–4	(Wales) Daniel Wells
(China) Xiao Guodong	6–1	(Switzerland) Alexander Ursenbacher
(Northern Ireland) Gerard Greene	4–6	(Scotland) Eden Sharav
(England) Alfie Burden	4–6	(Thailand) Noppon Saengkham
(Scotland) Stephen Maguire	6–4	(China) Liu Chuang
(Hong Kong) Marco Fu	6–0	(England) Shane Castle
(England) Anthony Hamilton	3–6	(England) Liam Highfield
(England) David Gilbert	6–1	(Scotland) Mark Owens
(England) Mark King	4–6	(England) Zak Surety
(Republic of Ireland) Fergal O'Brien	6–0	(Scotland) Fraser Patrick
(Thailand) Thepchaiya Un-Nooh	6–4	(England) Andrew Norman
(England) Rod Lawler	6–4	(China) Tian Pengfei
(England) Mark Selby	4–6	(England) Oliver Lines

== Century breaks ==
=== Qualifying stage centuries ===
- 136 – Gary Wilson
- 136 – Peter Ebdon
- 131 – Michael White
- 130 – Barry Pinches
- 129 – Michael Wasley
- 123 – Anthony McGill
- 120, 103 – Wang Zepeng
- 115 – Mark Selby
- 113 – Neil Robertson
- 112 – Ding Junhui
- 111 – Brandon Sargeant
- 109 – Jack Lisowski
- 109 – Judd Trump
- 109 – Mark Allen
- 108, 105 – Noppon Saengkham
- 108 – Matthew Stevens
- 106, 100 – Luca Brecel
- 105 – Daniel Wells
- 104 – Nigel Bond
- 104 – Oliver Brown
- 103 – Ken Doherty
- 103 – Alex Pagulayan
- 103 – Kyren Wilson
- 103 – Joe Swail
- 102 – Martin Gould
- 101 – Dominic Dale

=== Televised stage centuries ===
- 142 – Mitchell Mann
- 141, 134, 127, 108, 106 – Marco Fu
- 141, 132, 115, 111, 107, 103, 100, 100 – Ricky Walden
- 140 – Stephen Maguire
- 139 – Graeme Dott
- 139 – Zhao Xintong
- 135, 128 – Stuart Bingham
- 135, 120, 120, 105, 102 – Mark Williams
- 130 – Ryan Day
- 129, 101 – Mark Davis
- 127, 104 – Mark Joyce
- 126 – Fergal O'Brien
- 124, 116, 112, 101 – Ronnie O'Sullivan
- 123 – Ian Burns
- 122 – Xiao Guodong
- 121 – Sam Baird
- 118, 117, 113, 108, 105, 100 – Mark Allen
- 115 – Mike Dunn
- 107, 101, 100 – Martin Gould
- 107 – Joe Perry
- 106, 101 – Neil Robertson
- 106 – Dominic Dale
- 105 – Joel Walker
- 105 – Zhou Yuelong
- 104 – Rod Lawler
- 103 – Anthony McGill
- 102 – Judd Trump
- 101 – Craig Steadman
