= 2017 Paul Hunter Classic =

Paul Hunter Classic

Tournament information
- Dates: 22–27 August 2017
- Venue: Stadthalle
- City: Fürth
- Country: Germany
- Organisation: World Snooker
- Format: Ranking event
- Total prize fund: £100,000
- Winner's share: £20,000
- Highest break: Mark Selby (ENG) (143)

Final
- Champion: Michael White (WAL)
- Runner-up: Shaun Murphy (ENG)
- Score: 4–2

Location in Germany

The 2017 Paul Hunter Classic was a professional ranking snooker tournament that took place in August 2017 at the Stadthalle in Fürth, Germany. It was the third ranking event of the 2017/2018 season. The tournament is named in honour of former snooker professional, Paul Hunter.

Mark Selby was the defending champion, but he lost 1–4 to Michael White in the fourth round. White went on to beat Shaun Murphy 4–2 in the final, capturing his second world ranking title.

== Prize fund ==
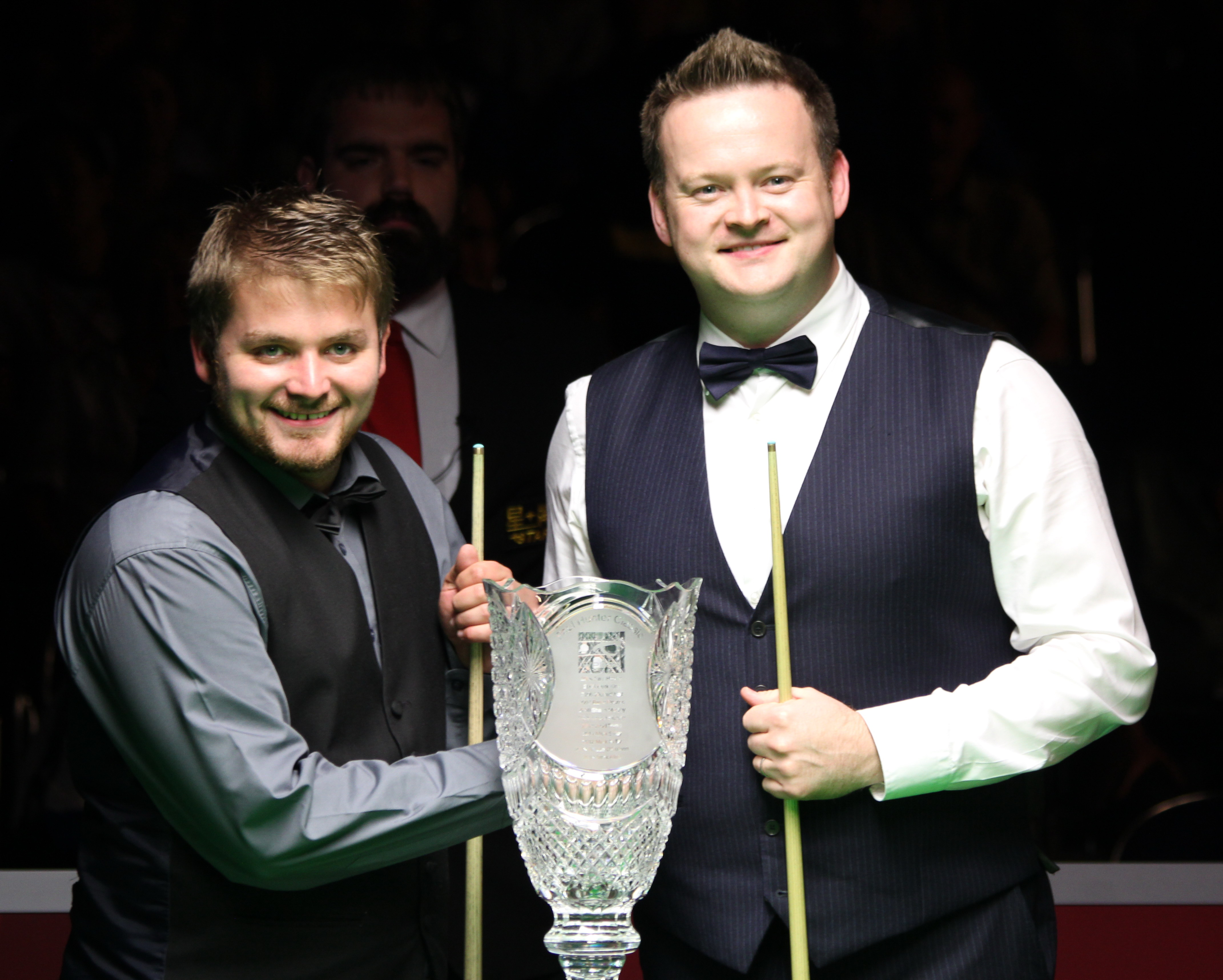
Finalists

The breakdown of prize money for this year is shown below:

- Winner: £20,000
- Runner up: £10,000
- Semifinals: £4,500
- Quarterfinals: £3,000
- Last 16: £1,725
- Last 32: £1,000
- Last 64: £600
- Total: £100,000

== Main rounds ==
=== Top half ===
==== Section 1 ====
Last 128; Best of 7 frames
(England) Gary Wilson	4
(England) Jimmy White	2
(China) Zhang Yong	3
(England) Rod Lawler	4
(England) David Grace	4
(England) Matthew Glasby	0
(England) Christopher Keogan	1
(England) Andy Symons	4
(Republic of Ireland) Fergal O'Brien	4
(England) Steven Hallworth	3
(Cyprus) Michael Georgiou	4
(Republic of Ireland) Josh Boileau	2
(Thailand) Noppon Saengkham	4
(England) Ashley Hugill	2
(England) Chris Wakelin	4
(Wales) Kishan Hirani	0

Last 64; Best of 7 frames
(England) Gary Wilson	4
(England) Rod Lawler	0
(England) David Grace	0
(England) Andy Symons	4
(Republic of Ireland) Fergal O'Brien	3
(Cyprus) Michael Georgiou	4
(Thailand) Noppon Saengkham	0
(England) Chris Wakelin	4

Last 32; Best of 7 frames
(England) Gary Wilson	4
(England) Andy Symons	1
(Cyprus) Michael Georgiou	3
(England) Chris Wakelin	4

Last 16; Best of 7 frames
(England) Gary Wilson	4
(England) Chris Wakelin	2

==== Section 2 ====
Last 128; Best of 7 frames
(Wales) Jak Jones	4
(England) Saqib Nasir	1
(England) Peter Lines	4
(Germany) Umut Dikme	1
(China) Fang Xiongman	4
(England) Sanderson Lam	3
(Scotland) Rhys Clark	3
(England) Paul Davison	4
(Wales) Dominic Dale	4
(England) Daniel Ward	1
(England) John Astley	4
(Poland) Daniel Holoyda	0
(England) Martin O'Donnell	4
(England) Zack Richardson	3
(England) Billy Joe Castle	2
(Wales) Jamie Jones	4

Last 64; Best of 7 frames
(Wales) Jak Jones	2
(England) Peter Lines	4
(China) Fang Xiongman	0
(England) Paul Davison	4
(Wales) Dominic Dale	4
(England) John Astley	0
(England) Martin O'Donnell	2
(Wales) Jamie Jones	4

Last 32; Best of 7 frames
(England) Peter Lines	4
(England) Paul Davison	1
(Wales) Dominic Dale	2
(Wales) Jamie Jones	4

Last 16; Best of 7 frames
(England) Peter Lines	0
(Wales) Jamie Jones	4

==== Section 3 ====
Last 128; Best of 7 frames
(England) Sean O'Sullivan	0
(England) Ricky Walden	4
(England) Stuart Carrington	4
(China) Wang Yuchen	1
(England) Robert Milkins	2
(Malta) Brian Cini	4
(England) Ben Woollaston	4
(Finland) Robin Hull	1
(England) Rory McLeod	2
(India) Aditya Mehta	4
(Wales) David John	2
(England) Jamie Cope	4
(England) Tom Ford	4
(England) Robert Read	0
(Switzerland) Alexander Ursenbacher	4
(Wales) Jamie Clarke	2

Last 64; Best of 7 frames
(England) Ricky Walden	3
(England) Stuart Carrington	4
(Malta) Brian Cini	0
(England) Ben Woollaston	4
(India) Aditya Mehta	2
(England) Jamie Cope	4
(England) Tom Ford	4
(Switzerland) Alexander Ursenbacher	1

Last 32; Best of 7 frames
(England) Stuart Carrington	1
(England) Ben Woollaston	4
(England) Jamie Cope	0
(England) Tom Ford	4

Last 16; Best of 7 frames
(England) Ben Woollaston	4
(England) Tom Ford	0

==== Section 4 ====
Last 128; Best of 7 frames
(England) Shaun Murphy	4
(Poland) Adam Stefanow	2
(England) Sam Baird	4
(England) Jimmy Robertson	0
(Wales) Darren Morgan	w/d
(Wales) Ian Preece	w/o
(Republic of Ireland) Ken Doherty	4
(Scotland) Ross Muir	1
(China) Zhao Xintong	4
(England) Reanne Evans	0
(Pakistan) Hamza Akbar	w/d
(England) Kuldesh Johal	w/o
(Northern Ireland) Gerard Greene	2
(England) Craig Steadman	4
(England) Stuart Bingham	0
(China) Yu Delu	4

Last 64; Best of 7 frames
(England) Shaun Murphy	4
(England) Sam Baird	1
(Wales) Ian Preece	1
(Republic of Ireland) Ken Doherty	4
(China) Zhao Xintong	4
(England) Kuldesh Johal	0
(England) Craig Steadman	4
(China) Yu Delu	3

Last 32; Best of 7 frames
(England) Shaun Murphy	4
(Republic of Ireland) Ken Doherty	0
(China) Zhao Xintong	4
(England) Craig Steadman	2

Last 16; Best of 7 frames
(England) Shaun Murphy	4
(China) Zhao Xintong	2

=== Bottom half ===
==== Section 5 ====
Last 128; Best of 7 frames
(England) Allan Taylor	1
(Scotland) Alan McManus	4
(Norway) Kurt Maflin	4
(England) Brandon Sargeant	1
(England) Kyren Wilson	4
(Australia) Kurt Dunham	0
(England) Jamie Curtis-Barrett	4
(Scotland) Chris Totten	2
(England) Ian Burns	4
(England) Andy Hicks	3
(Scotland) Scott Donaldson	3
(England) Alfie Burden	4
(Germany) Lukas Kleckers	2
(England) Joe O'Connor	4
(China) Li Yuan	2
(England) Harvey Chandler	4

Last 64; Best of 7 frames
(Scotland) Alan McManus	4
(Norway) Kurt Maflin	3
(England) Kyren Wilson	4
(England) Jamie Curtis-Barrett	0
(England) Ian Burns	4
(England) Alfie Burden	2
(England) Joe O'Connor	4
(England) Harvey Chandler	1

Last 32; Best of 7 frames
(Scotland) Alan McManus	0
(England) Kyren Wilson	4
(England) Ian Burns	4
(England) Joe O'Connor	0

Last 16; Best of 7 frames
(England) Kyren Wilson	3
(England) Ian Burns	4

==== Section 6 ====
Last 128; Best of 7 frames
(Scotland) Eden Sharav	1
(Malta) Alex Borg	4
(England) Mike Dunn	4
(Scotland) Lee Mein	1
(England) Robbie Williams	4
(England) Matthew Selt	2
(England) Adam Duffy	3
(Wales) Michael White	4
(Northern Ireland) Joe Swail	4
(England) Louis Heathcote	3
(China) Chen Zhe	w/d
(England) Adam Edge	w/o
(France) Niel Vincent (Note: Wildcard)	1
(England) Michael Williams	4
(England) Michael Holt	2
(England) Mark Selby	4

Last 64; Best of 7 frames
(Malta) Alex Borg	2
(England) Mike Dunn	4
(England) Robbie Williams	1
(Wales) Michael White	4
(Northern Ireland) Joe Swail	4
(England) Adam Edge	2
(England) Michael Williams	1
(England) Mark Selby	4

Last 32; Best of 7 frames
(England) Mike Dunn	0
(Wales) Michael White	4
(Northern Ireland) Joe Swail	3
(England) Mark Selby	4

Last 16; Best of 7 frames
(Wales) Michael White	4
(England) Mark Selby	1

==== Section 7 ====
Last 128; Best of 7 frames
(Iran) Soheil Vahedi	w/d
(England) David Gilbert	w/o
(England) Nigel Bond	4
(England) Joshua Thomond	3
(Wales) Mark Williams	w/d
(England) George Pragnall	w/o
(Australia) Matthew Bolton	3
(England) Barry Pinches	4
(England) Mitchell Mann	4
(Wales) Daniel Wells	2
(China) Xu Si	3
(England) Robert James	4
(England) Liam Highfield	4
(Wales) Lee Walker	1
(England) Oliver Lines	0
(England) Oliver Brown	4

Last 64; Best of 7 frames
(England) David Gilbert	4
(England) Nigel Bond	3
(England) George Pragnall	4
(England) Barry Pinches	3
(England) Mitchell Mann	4
(England) Robert James	1
(England) Liam Highfield	3
(England) Oliver Brown	4

Last 32; Best of 7 frames
(England) David Gilbert	3
(England) George Pragnall	4
(England) Mitchell Mann	4
(England) Oliver Brown	1

Last 16; Best of 7 frames
(England) George Pragnall	1
(England) Mitchell Mann	4

==== Section 8 ====
Last 128; Best of 7 frames
(Wales) Matthew Stevens	4
(Poland) Kacper Filipiak	1
(China) Yuan Sijun	w/d
(England) Sam Craigie	w/o
(England) Mark Joyce	4
(Scotland) Marc J Davis	0
(England) Hammad Miah	2
(England) Andrew Higginson	4
(England) Peter Ebdon	4
(England) Martin Gould	1
(England) Jack Lisowski	4
(Germany) Roman Dietzel	3
(Belgium) Luca Brecel	4
(England) Ashley Carty	1
(England) Mark King	4
(England) Elliot Slessor	2

Last 64; Best of 7 frames
(Wales) Matthew Stevens	4
(England) Sam Craigie	0
(England) Mark Joyce	4
(England) Andrew Higginson	1
(England) Peter Ebdon	4
(England) Jack Lisowski	1
(Belgium) Luca Brecel	1
(England) Mark King	4

Last 32; Best of 7 frames
(Wales) Matthew Stevens	1
(England) Mark Joyce	4
(England) Peter Ebdon	1
(England) Mark King	4

Last 16; Best of 7 frames
(England) Mark Joyce	4
(England) Mark King	3

=== Finals ===
Quarter-finals; Best of 7 frames
(England) Gary Wilson	2
(Wales) Jamie Jones	4
(England) Ben Woollaston	2
(England) Shaun Murphy	4
(England) Ian Burns	1
(Wales) Michael White	4
(England) Mitchell Mann	4
(England) Mark Joyce	3

Semi-finals; Best of 7 frames
(Wales) Jamie Jones	3
(England) Shaun Murphy	4
(Wales) Michael White	4
(England) Mitchell Mann	1

Final; Best of 7 frames
(England) Shaun Murphy	2
(Wales) Michael White	4

== Final ==
Final: Best of 7 frames. Referee: Martyn Royce. Stadthalle, Fürth, Germany, 27 August 2017.
Shaun Murphy; England	2–4	Michael White; Wales
0–79, 27–72, 84–0 (84), 9–90 (83), 59–53, 0–97 (97)
84	Highest break	97
0	Century breaks	0
1	50+ breaks	2

== Amateur pre-qualifying ==
These matches were played in Fürth on 22–24 August 2017. All matches were best of 7 frames.

=== Round 1 ===
(Germany) Thomas Frank	3–4	(Germany) Norbert Hofheinz
(Wales) Daniel Williams	0–4	(England) Matthew Glasby
(England) Mike Finn	w/o–w/d	(Finland) Mika Hummelin
(Germany) Andreas Volkert	0–4	(England) Andy Symons
(Poland) Wojciech Pastor	4–3	(Germany) Daniel Schneider
(Romania) Corina Maracine	w/o–w/d	(Romania) Dragos-Bogdan Dorojan
(Wales) Joshua Sellar	3–4	(Wales) Lewis Sinclair
(Turkey) Ismail Türker	4–1	(Germany) Stefan Gerst
(England) Jenson Kendrick	4–1	(Germany) Thomas Goder
(Northern Ireland) Conor McCormack	4–1	(Germany) Jürgen Kesseler
(Germany) Umut Dikme	4–0	(Germany) Felix Frede
(Wales) Alex Taubman	4–0	(England) Bhavesh Sodha
(England) Reggie Edwards	4–1	(Belgium) Wan Chooi Tan
(England) Daniel Ward	4–0	(Germany) Mike Beneke
(Belgium) Amedeo Durnez	4–1	(England) Matthew Hudson
(England) Patrick Whelan	2–4	(England) Dillon McGee
(England) Luke Pinches	2–4	(England) Zack Richardson
(Germany) Hans Bergmann	0–4	(Germany) Robin Otto
(Malta) Brian Cini	4–2	(England) Michael Wild
(England) Scott Lyons	0–4	(Northern Ireland) Declan Brennan
(Republic of Ireland) Tony Corrigan	1–4	(England) Jamie Cope
(Switzerland) Luis Vetter	3–4	(England) Louis Wakelin
(Wales) Andrew Rogers	4–1	(Germany) Ronny Buchholz
(China) Jiaming Zhang	1–4	(Wales) Ben Jones
(Malta) Tony Drago	4–0	(Germany) Peter Brehm
(England) Jeff Cundy	4–1	(Germany) Christof Biniarsch
(England) Andrew Molyneux	4–0	(Germany) Heiko Mutz
(Germany) Michael Drews	3–4	(Germany) Stefan Joachim
(England) Reanne Evans	4–3	(Turkey) Soner Sari
(England) Imran Nisar	4–0	(Belgium) Tomas Vastenavondt
(England) Joshua Cooper	4–0	(England) Maria Catalano
(Germany) Rolf Mahr	0–4	(Scotland) Aaron Graham
(Northern Ireland) Billy Ginn	4–1	(England) Aaron Cook

(Germany) Jens Kirchner	0–4	(England) Brandon Sargeant
(Syria) Alkojah Omar	1–4	(England) Andy Hicks
(Finland) Heikki Niva	4–0	(Germany) Pedro Chacon
(England) Ron Kantor	0–4	(Germany) Andreas Hartung
(England) John Parkin	4–1	(Switzerland) Tom Zimmermann
(England) Harvey Chandler	4–1	(Belgium) Lieven Vanthournout
(England) Sam Thistlewhite	4–0	(Netherlands) Kevin Chan
(Scotland) Lee Mein	4–1	(Germany) Paul Liebstreich
(Bulgaria) Boris Lazarkov	0–4	(Germany) Stefan Dohr
(England) Louis Heathcote	4–1	(England) Hamim Hussain
(Germany) Hassan Glumcevic-Kaufmann	0–4	(Scotland) Gary Thomson
(Poland) Antoni Kowalski	4–0	(Germany) Michael Buchholz
(England) Adam Edge	4–1	(Scotland) Fraser Patrick
(Germany) Jörg Petersen	2–4	(England) David Church
(Germany) Luis Chacon	0–4	(England) Michael Williams
(Scotland) Michael Collumb	3–4	(England) Joshua Thomond
(England) Andrew Milliard	3–4	(Germany) Luca Kaufmann
(Germany) Kilian Baur-Pantoulier	3–4	(England) Simon Dent
(Northern Ireland) Billy Brown	0–4	(England) Barry Pinches
(Romania) Tudor Simion Popescu	4–2	(Turkey) Ali Kirim
(England) Robert James	4–2	(England) John Foster
(England) Ryan Causton	4–0	(Germany) Sascha Breuer
(France) Fabian Monnin	4–3	(Romania) Mihai Vladu
(Germany) Dietmar Smolka	0–4	(England) Luke Simmonds
(England) Jamie O'Neill	w/d–w/o	(Wales) Jackson Page
(Poland) Kacper Filipiak	4–0	(Germany) Frank Mikulsky
(France) Gregory Herbrecht	4–2	(Germany) Carl Rosenberger
(Wales) Tyler Rees	4–0	(England) Shahidul Islam
(Germany) Fabian Haken	4–1	(Germany) Fabian Meulner
(Switzerland) Marvin Losi	3–4	(Romania) Andrei Orzan
(Germany) Stefan Schenk	1–4	(Germany) Patrick Einsle
(England) Ashley Carty	4–0	(England) Anthony Blyth

=== Round 2 ===
(Poland) Marcin Nitschke	4–0	(Germany) Norbert Hofheinz
(France) Christophe Rives-Lange	0–4	(England) Matthew Glasby
(Germany) Oliver Kremp	0–4	(England) Mike Finn
(Germany) Anton Woywod	0–4	(England) Andy Symons
(England) Steven Hallworth	4–0	(Poland) Wojciech Pastor
(Germany) Horst Bendig	4–1	(Romania) Corina Maracine
(Wales) Kishan Hirani	4–0	(Wales) Lewis Sinclair
(England) Jinyoung Foulger	4–2	(Turkey) Ismail Türker
(France) Brian Ochoiski	4–3	(England) Jenson Kendrick
(England) Saqib Nasir	4–1	(Northern Ireland) Conor McCormack
(England) Manasawin Phetmalaikul	1–4	(Germany) Umut Dikme
(Austria) Michael Peyr	0–4	(Wales) Alex Taubman
(Austria) Florian Nüßle	4–0	(England) Reggie Edwards
(England) Mark Vincent	w/d–w/o	(England) Daniel Ward
(England) Halim Hussain	0–4	(Belgium) Amedeo Durnez
(Poland) Daniel Holoyda	4–2	(England) Dillon McGee
(Bosnia and Herzegovina) Mario-Željo Miloševic	0–4	(England) Zack Richardson
(England) Martin Pitcher	1–4	(Germany) Robin Otto
(Germany) Markus Fischer	0–4	(Malta) Brian Cini
(England) Gary Challis	1–4	(Northern Ireland) Declan Brennan
(Germany) Ralf Günzel	0–4	(England) Jamie Cope
(Germany) Thomas Blang	0–4	(England) Louis Wakelin
(England) Nev Graham	2–4	(Wales) Andrew Rogers
(England) Robert Read	4–3	(Wales) Ben Jones
(England) Curtis Daher	1–4	(Malta) Tony Drago
(Wales) Jamie Clarke	4–1	(England) Jeff Cundy
(Wales) Jack Bradford	3–4	(England) Andrew Molyneux
(Poland) Adam Stefanow	4–0	(Germany) Stefan Joachim
(Germany) Jan Eisenstein	2–4	(England) Reanne Evans
(Denmark) Ejler Hame	0–4	(England) Imran Nisar
(England) Kuldesh Johal	4–1	(England) Joshua Cooper
(England) Thomas Kevern	4–1	(Scotland) Aaron Graham
(Poland) Mateusz Baranowski	4–0	(Northern Ireland) Billy Ginn

(England) John Gillard	0–4	(England) Brandon Sargeant
(France) Stephane Ochoiski	2–4	(England) Andy Hicks
(Syria) Mohammad Al Asfar	0–4	(Finland) Heikki Niva
(England) Peter Devlin	4–0	(Germany) Andreas Hartung
(England) Joe O'Connor	4–1	(England) John Parkin
(Germany) Loris Lehmann	0–4	(England) Harvey Chandler
(France) Regis D'Anna	0–4	(England) Sam Thistlewhite
(Germany) Nicolai Gebhardt	0–4	(Scotland) Lee Mein
(China) Hu Hao	w/d–w/o	(Germany) Stefan Dohr
(England) Wayne Brown	1–4	(England) Louis Heathcote
(England) Josh Mulholland	3–4	(Scotland) Gary Thomson
(England) James Cahill	w/d–w/o	(Poland) Antoni Kowalski
(Austria) Andreas Ploner	3–4	(England) Adam Edge
(England) Jake Nicholson	4–0	(England) David Church
(England) Joe Steele	w/d–w/o	(England) Michael Williams
(England) Clayton Humphries	1–4	(England) Joshua Thomond
(India) Vedant Kulkarni	w/d–w/o	(England) Sean McAllister
(Afghanistan) Abdullah Atmar Ghulam Jilani	0–4	(Germany) Luca Kaufmann
(England) George Pragnall	4–1	(England) Simon Dent
(Germany) Bernd Strnad	0–4	(England) Barry Pinches
(Germany) Volker Grigo	0–4	(Romania) Tudor Simion Popescu
(Finland) Jani Kananen	0–4	(England) Robert James
(England) Charlie Walters	4–2	(England) Ryan Causton
(England) Oliver Brown	4–0	(France) Fabian Monnin
(Wales) Simon Brtyant	0–4	(England) Luke Simmonds
(India) Nitin Sharma	w/d–w/o	(Wales) Jackson Page
(Poland) Karol Lelek	0–4	(Poland) Kacper Filipiak
(England) Stuart Watson	4–0	(France) Gregory Herbrecht
(Scotland) Marc J Davis	4–2	(Wales) Tyler Rees
(England) Barry Mincher	0–4	(Germany) Fabian Haken
(Germany) Roman Dietzel	4–3	(Romania) Andrei Orzan
(Belgium) Ben Mertens	2–4	(Germany) Patrick Einsle
(Germany) Simon Lichtenberg	2–4	(England) Ashley Carty

=== Round 3 ===
(Poland) Marcin Nitschke	1–4	(England) Matthew Glasby
(England) Mike Finn	0–4	(England) Andy Symons
(England) Steven Hallworth	4–0	(Germany) Horst Bendig
(Wales) Kishan Hirani	4–2	(England) Jinyoung Foulger
(France) Brian Ochoiski	0–4	(England) Saqib Nasir
(Germany) Umut Dikme	4–0	(Wales) Alex Taubman
(Austria) Florian Nüßle	2–4	(England) Daniel Ward
(Belgium) Amedeo Durnez	3–4	(Poland) Daniel Holoyda
(England) Zack Richardson	4–1	(Germany) Robin Otto
(Malta) Brian Cini	4–3	(Northern Ireland) Declan Brennan
(England) Jamie Cope	4–0	(England) Louis Wakelin
(Wales) Andrew Rogers	2–4	(England) Robert Read
(Malta) Tony Drago	3–4	(Wales) Jamie Clarke
(England) Andrew Molyneux	0–4	(Poland) Adam Stefanow
(England) Reanne Evans	4–2	(England) Imran Nisar
(England) Kuldesh Johal	4–1	(England) Thomas Kevern
(Poland) Mateusz Baranowski	0–4	(England) Brandon Sargeant

(England) Andy Hicks	4–1	(Finland) Heikki Niva
(England) Peter Devlin	3–4	(England) Joe O'Connor
(England) Harvey Chandler	4–3	(England) Sam Thistlewhite
(Scotland) Lee Mein	4–0	(Germany) Stefan Dohr
(England) Louis Heathcote	4–0	(Scotland) Gary Thomson
(Poland) Antoni Kowalski	2–4	(England) Adam Edge
(England) Jake Nicholson	1–4	(England) Michael Williams
(England) Joshua Thomond	4–2	(England) Sean McAllister
(Germany) Luca Kaufmann	0–4	(England) George Pragnall
(England) Barry Pinches	4–0	(Romania) Tudor Simion Popescu
(England) Robert James	4–1	(England) Charlie Walters
(England) Oliver Brown	4–0	(England) Luke Simmonds
(Wales) Jackson Page	2–4	(Poland) Kacper Filipiak
(England) Stuart Watson	2–4	(Scotland) Marc J Davis
(Germany) Fabian Haken	0–4	(Germany) Roman Dietzel
(Germany) Patrick Einsle	1–4	(England) Ashley Carty

== Century breaks ==
=== Main rounds centuries ===
Total: 24

- 143 – Mark Selby
- 142 – Dominic Dale
- 132 – Paul Davison
- 132 – Kyren Wilson
- 124 – Fergal O'Brien
- 123, 120, 104 – Mark Joyce
- 123 – Martin O'Donnell
- 122 – Mark King
- 119, 102, 100 – Jamie Jones
- 115 – Nigel Bond
- 114 – Jak Jones
- 109 – Kurt Maflin
- 107, 106 – Gary Wilson
- 107, 106 – Ben Woollaston
- 105 – Liam Highfield
- 104 – Shaun Murphy
- 103 – Tom Ford
- 100 – Alan McManus

=== Amateur pre-qualifying stage centuries ===
- 117 – Ashley Carty
- 107, 103 – Barry Pinches
- 105 – Jamie Cope
- 102 – Andy Hicks
- 102 – Adam Stefanow
- 101 – Louis Heathcote
