= EBSA European Under-21 Snooker Championship =

The EBSA European Under-21 Snooker Championships is the premier amateur junior snooker tournament in Europe. The event series is sanctioned by the European Billiards and Snooker Association. It took place first in 1997 and is held annually since then. The event was known as the EBSA European Under-19 Snooker Championships until 2010. In most years the winner of the tournament qualifies for the next two seasons of the World Snooker Tour as well as being awarded the Ebdon Trophy which is named in honour of former World Champion Peter Ebdon.

== Winners ==
Year	Venue	Winner	Runner-up	Score	Ref
EBSA European Under-19 Snooker Championships
1997	Saint Helier, Jersey	(Republic of Ireland) Thomas Dowling	(England) Michael Holt	6–3	
1998	Rabat, Malta	(Wales) Ian Preece	(Northern Ireland) Sean O'Neill	7–3	
1999	Kalisz, Poland	(Netherlands) Gerrit bij de Leij	(Wales) Ian Preece	6–3	
2000	Budapest, Hungary	(England) Roger Baksa	(Netherlands) Rolf de Jong	6–3	
2001	Bad Wildungen, Germany	(England) Mark Joyce	(Wales) David Donovan	6–3	
2002	Carlow, Ireland	(Scotland) Robert Shanks	(England) Mark Joyce	6–3	
2003	Riga, Latvia	(England) Jamie O’Neill	(Scotland) Robert Shanks	6–3	
2004	Wellingborough, England	(Wales) Jamie Jones	(Northern Ireland) Mark Allen	6–3	
2005	Yekaterinburg, Russia	(Northern Ireland) Mark Allen	(England) Chris Norbury	6–5	
2006	Riga, Latvia	(England) Ben Woollaston	(Republic of Ireland) Vincent Muldoon	6–4	
2007	Prestatyn, Wales	(Wales) Michael White	(Republic of Ireland) Vincent Muldoon	6–2	
2008	Glasgow, Scotland	(England) Stephen Craigie	(Scotland) Anthony McGill	6–2	
2009	Saint Petersburg, Russia	(Belgium) Luca Brecel	(England) Michael Wasley	6–5	
2010	Qawra, Malta	(Wales) Jak Jones	(Scotland) Anthony McGill	6–4	
EBSA European Under-21 Snooker Championships
2011	Qawra, Malta	(Poland) Kacper Filipiak	(Scotland) Michael Leslie	6–3	
2012	Sofia, Bulgaria	(Scotland) Michael Leslie	(England) Shane Castle	6–2	
2013	Bor, Serbia	(England) James Cahill	(England) Ashley Carty	6–0	
2014	Bucharest, Romania	(England) Oliver Lines	(Republic of Ireland) Josh Boileau	6–1	
2015	Qawra, Malta	(Isle of Man) Darryl Hill	(England) Louis Heathcote	6–3	
2016	Wrocław, Poland	(Republic of Ireland) Josh Boileau	(England) Brandon Sargeant	6–1	
2017	Nicosia, Cyprus	(Switzerland) Alexander Ursenbacher	(Wales) Jackson Page	6–4	
2018	Sofia, Bulgaria	(Germany) Simon Lichtenberg	(Wales) Tyler Rees	6–3	
2019	Eilat, Israel	(Wales) Jackson Page	(Republic of Ireland) Ross Bulman	5–1	
2020	Albufeira, Portugal	(Republic of Ireland) Aaron Hill	(England) Hayden Staniland	5–2	
2021	Albufeira, Portugal	(Wales) Dylan Emery	(Belgium) Julien Leclercq	5–2	
2022	Shengjin, Albania	(Belgium) Ben Mertens	(Austria) Florian Nüßle	5–1	
2023	St. Paul's Bay, Malta	(Scotland) Liam Graham	(Ukraine) Iulian Boiko	5–2	
2024	Sarajevo, Bosnia and Herzegovina	(Wales) Liam Davies	(Poland) Antoni Kowalski	5–3	
2025	Antalya, Turkey	(Ukraine) Iulian Boiko	(England) Oliver Sykes	5–4	
2026	Gandia, Spain	(Ukraine) Anton Kazakov	(Wales) Riley Powell	5–3	

== Statistics ==
=== Champions by country ===
Country	Players	First title	Last title
England	7	2000	2014
Wales	7	1998	2024
Ireland	3	1997	2020
Scotland	3	2002	2023
Belgium	2	2009	2022
Ukraine	2	2025	2026
Netherlands	1	1999	1999
Northern Ireland	1	2005	2005
Poland	1	2011	2011
Isle of Man	1	2015	2015
Switzerland	1	2017	2017
Germany	1	2018	2018

== See also ==
- EBSA European Snooker Championship
- EBSA European Under-18 Snooker Championships
- IBSF World Under-21 Snooker Championship
- World Snooker Tour
