= Guangzhou Sport University =

University in Guangzhou, China

Coordinates: 23.1431°N 113.3164°E

- 广州体育学院 (Chinese)
- Motto: 德厚学博，文精武杰
- Motto in English: De Hou Xue Bo, Wen Jing Wu Jie
- Type: Public university
- Established: 1956; 70 years ago
- Location: Guangzhou, Guangdong, China
- Website: GZSU English Website; GZSU Chinese Website

Chinese name
- Simplified Chinese: 广州体育学院
- Traditional Chinese: 廣州體育學院
Transcriptions
Standard Mandarin
- Hanyu Pinyin: Guǎngzhōu tǐyù xuéyuàn

Guangzhou Sport University (Chinese: 广州体育学院) is a provincial public university based in Guangzhou, Guangdong, China. On June 9, 1956, the Guangzhou Sport University was established with the approval of the Guangzhou Municipal Government of Guangdong Province.

== History ==
The university was formerly known as Guangzhou Physical Education Institute.
