= 2014 EBSA European Under-21 Snooker Championship =

EBSA European Under-21 Snooker Championships
Tournament information
- City: Bucharest
- Country: Romania
- Organisation: EBSA

Final
- Champion: Oliver Lines (ENG)
- Runner-up: Josh Boileau (IRE)
- Score: 6–1

The 2014 EBSA European Under-21 Snooker Championships took place in Bucharest, Romania between 18 and 23 March 2014. It was won by fourteenth seed Englishman Oliver Lines who defeated twentieth seed Republic of Irishman Josh Boileau 6–1 in the final. For winning the tournament, Oliver Lines was rewarded with a place in the 2014/15 snooker season.

== Results ==
Round One
1	(Isle of Man) Darryl Hill	4
64	(Sweden) Belan Sharif	2
33	(Sweden) Simon Lindblom	2
32	(Belgium) Jeff Jacobs	4
17	(Republic of Ireland) Daniel Dempsey	4
48	(Malta) Chris Peplow	3
49	(France) Niel Vincent	1
16	(England) Ashley Carty	4
9	(Israel) Shachar Ruberg	4
56	(Croatia) Roberto Bartol	0
41	(Romania) Vladu Mihai	2
24	(Israel) Maor Shalom	4
25	(England) Sanderson Lam	4
40	(Poland) Patryk Masłowski	3
57	(Sweden) Arpat Pulat	0
8	(Wales) Jamie Clarke	4
5	(Germany) Lukas Kleckers	4
60	(Czech Republic) Tomas Kubicek	0
37	(Romania) Andrei Orzan	4
28	(Scotland) Lee Mein	3
21	(Republic of Ireland) Stephen Bateman	0
44	(Austria) Dominik Scherübl	4
53	(Lithuania) Vilius Schulte	1
12	(Finland) Olli-Pekka Virho	4
13	(Austria) Andreas Ploner	4
52	(Bulgaria) Spasian Spasov	1
45	(Belgium) Sybren Sokolowski	0
20	(Republic of Ireland) Josh Boileau	4
29	(Wales) Tom Rees	4
36	(Wales) Edward Topham	3
61	(Romania) Tudor Popescu	1
4	(Germany) Simon Lichtenberg	4
3	(Scotland) Rhys Clark	4
62	(Romania) Alexandru Statache	1
35	(Republic of Ireland) Ryan Cronin	1
30	(Poland) Grzegorz Biernadski	4
19	(Poland) Mateusz Baranowski	3
46	(Finland) Saku Veikkanen	4
51	(Belgium) Jan Corten	0
14	(England) Oliver Lines	4
11	(Poland) Kacper Filipiak	4
54	(Switzerland) Marvin Losi	0
43	(Bulgaria) Georgi Velichkov	3
22	(Northern Ireland) Declan Brennan	4
27	(Estonia) Andres Petrov	4
38	(Israel) Amir Nardeia	0
59	(Finland) Jori Merikoski	1
6	(Wales) Duane Jones	4
7	(Malta) Brian Cini	4
58	(Ukraine) Vladyslav Vyshnevskyy	2
39	(Bulgaria) Ivailo Pekov	2
26	(Scotland) Joseph McLaren	4
23	(Republic of Ireland) David Cassidy	4
42	(Austria) Markus Pfistermüller	0
55	(Romania) Mario Amza	2
10	(England) Clayton Humphries	4
15	(Scotland) Dylan Craig	4
50	(Sweden) Benjamin McCabe	1
47	(Russia) Ildar Sharipov	0
18	(Wales) Sam Thomas	4
31	(Germany) Robin Otto	2
34	(Germany) Sascha Breuer	4
63	(Hungary) Soma Berghold	0
2	(Poland) Adam Stefanów	4

Round Two
1	(Isle of Man) Darryl Hill	4
32	(Belgium) Jeff Jacobs	1
17	(Republic of Ireland) Daniel Dempsey	0
16	(England) Ashley Carty	4
9	(Israel) Shachar Ruberg	4
24	(Israel) Maor Shalom	3
25	(England) Sanderson Lam	4
8	(Wales) Jamie Clarke	3
5	(Germany) Lukas Kleckers	4
37	(Romania) Andrei Orzan	2
44	(Austria) Dominik Scherübl	1
12	(Finland) Olli-Pekka Virho	4
13	(Austria) Andreas Ploner	2
20	(Republic of Ireland) Josh Boileau	4
29	(Wales) Tom Rees	4
4	(Germany) Simon Lichtenberg	1
3	(Scotland) Rhys Clark	4
30	(Poland) Grzegorz Biernadski	2
46	(Finland) Saku Veikkanen	0
14	(England) Oliver Lines	4
11	(Poland) Kacper Filipiak	3
22	(Northern Ireland) Declan Brennan	4
27	(Estonia) Andres Petrov	3
6	(Wales) Duane Jones	4
7	(Malta) Brian Cini	2
26	(Scotland) Joseph McLaren	4
23	(Republic of Ireland) David Cassidy	4
10	(England) Clayton Humphries	3
15	(Scotland) Dylan Craig	2
18	(Wales) Sam Thomas	4
34	(Germany) Sascha Breuer	4
2	(Poland) Adam Stefanów	1

Round Three
1	(Isle of Man) Darryl Hill	2
16	(England) Ashley Carty	4
9	(Israel) Shachar Ruberg	1
25	(England) Sanderson Lam	4
5	(Germany) Lukas Kleckers	4
12	(Finland) Olli-Pekka Virho	0
20	(Republic of Ireland) Josh Boileau	4
29	(Wales) Tom Rees	1
3	(Scotland) Rhys Clark	3
14	(England) Oliver Lines	4
22	(Northern Ireland) Declan Brennan	2
6	(Wales) Duane Jones	4
26	(Scotland) Joseph McLaren	0
23	(Republic of Ireland) David Cassidy	4
18	(Wales) Sam Thomas	2
34	(Germany) Sascha Breuer	4

Quarter-finals
16	(England) Ashley Carty	5
25	(England) Sanderson Lam	3
5	(Germany) Lukas Kleckers	3
20	(Republic of Ireland) Josh Boileau	5
14	(England) Oliver Lines	5
6	(Wales) Duane Jones	1
23	(Republic of Ireland) David Cassidy	5
34	(Germany) Sascha Breuer	0

Semi-finals
16	(England) Ashley Carty	2
20	(Republic of Ireland) Josh Boileau	5
14	(England) Oliver Lines	5
23	(Republic of Ireland) David Cassidy	2

Final
20	(Republic of Ireland) Josh Boileau	1
14	(England) Oliver Lines	6
