= Oliver Lines =

English snooker player (born 1995)

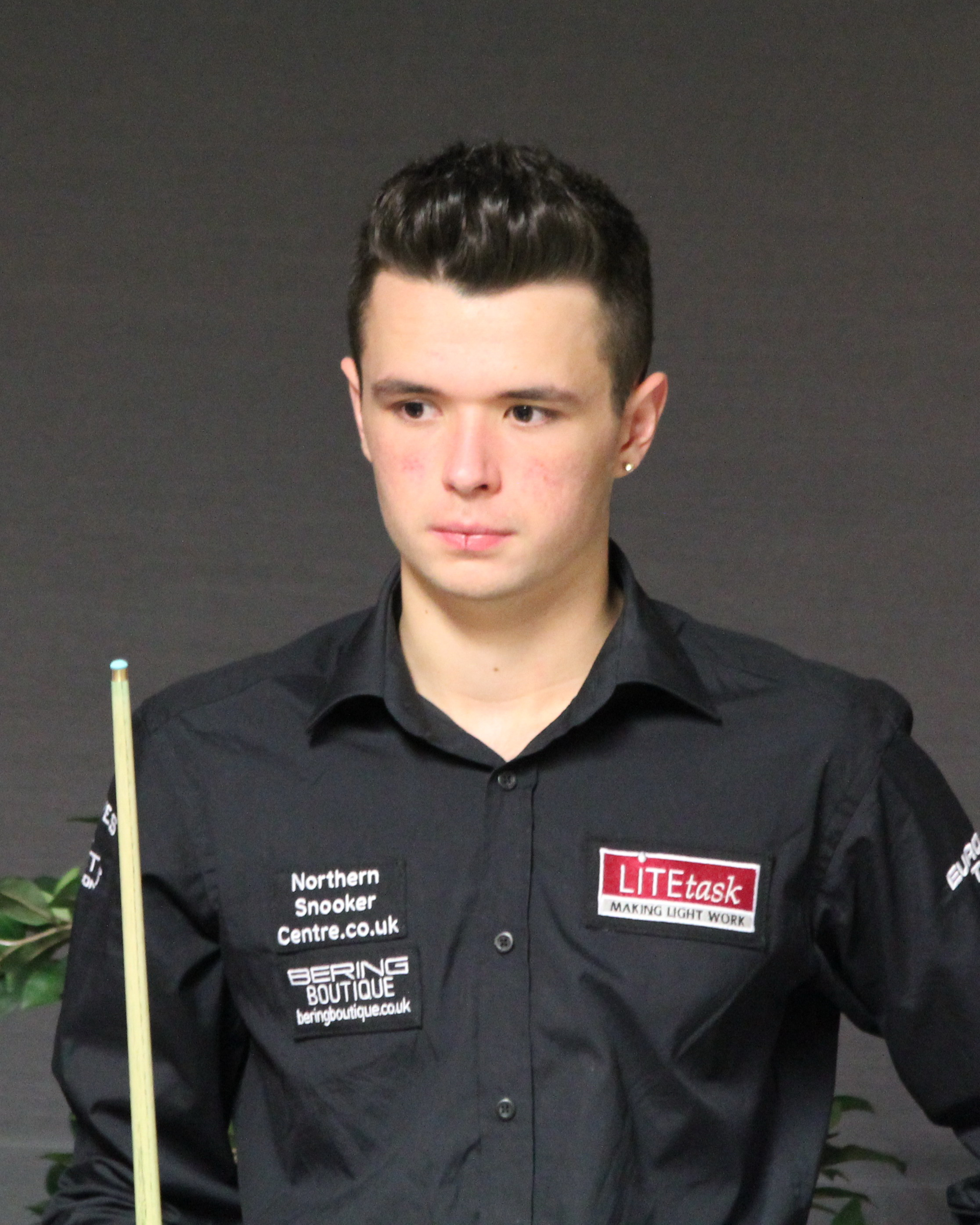
- Lines at the 2014 Paul Hunter Classic

Personal information
- Born: 16 June 1995 (age 31) Seacroft, Leeds, England

Sport
- Country: England
- Sport: Snooker
- Professional: 2014–present
- Highest ranking: 51 (July 2026)
- Current ranking: 54 (as of 7 November 2026)
- Best ranking finish: Semi-final (2024 British Open)

Oliver Lines (born 16 June 1995) is an English professional snooker player who practises at Northern Snooker Centre in Leeds. He is the son of former professional snooker player Peter Lines. His best performance in a ranking event was reaching the semi-final of the 2024 British Open.

== Career ==
=== Amateur ===
Lines switched sports from football to snooker at aged 14. His progression continued by entering into the Players Tour Championship events in 2011, but made little impact in the 2011/2012 season. 2012/2013 saw major improvement and a notable 4–3 over Joe Perry in 2012 UKPTC 3. He also entered Q School for the first time in May 2013 in the hope of qualifying on the main but failed to do after securing four wins in the three events. Despite not qualifying for the main tour, Lines’ performances in Q School were enough to earn him a top up place in the qualifying round of the 2013 Australian Goldfields Open, his first senior ranking event. He won in the opening round, beating fellow Leeds-based player David Grace 5–4, but suffered a 5–4 reverse in the second round last-96 stage to Zhang Anda of China. For the rest of the season, Lines continued to enter PTC and amateur events, with his most notable result being a 4–2 over professional Scott Donaldson in the 2013 Ruhr Open.

=== Professional ===
In 2014, Lines won a place on the professional World Snooker Tour for the 2014–15 and 2015–16 seasons after beating Josh Boileau 6–1 in the final of the 2014 EBSA European Under-21 Snooker Championships.

==== 2014/2015 ====
His first match as a professional was a successful one, beating Dave Harold 5–4 in the qualifying stages of the Wuxi Classic, but he lost 5–1 to amateur Oliver Brown at the venue stage. He had a run to the last 16 stage of the opening Asian PTC event of the season in the Yixing Open, but failed to qualify for the Australian Goldfields Open and Shanghai Masters. In qualifying for the International Championship Lines beat world champion and world number one Mark Selby 6–4 from 4–0 down at the mid-session interval. He continued to impress at the Haining Open by reaching his first professional semi-final after dispatching Ryan Day 4–2 with breaks of 120 and 113. He then edged out Jimmy Robertson 4–3, but was whitewashed 4–0 in the final by Stuart Bingham. He came through a wildcard match at the International, but lost 6–3 to Rod Lawler in the first round. Lines’ Asian final helped him finish fifth on their Order of Merit to make his debut in the Grand Final, where he was eliminated 4–1 by Matthew Selt in the opening round. His first season as a professional concluded with a 10–7 defeat against Mark Davis in the second round of World Championship qualifying. He finished his first season as a professional ranked world number 78.

==== 2015/2016 ====
Lines signed up with Django Fung, who manages players such as Ronnie O'Sullivan and Judd Trump, and Lines hoped it would help him further his career. A 4–2 win over Ali Carter saw Lines reach the last 16 of the Riga Open, but he lost 4–0 to Liang Wenbo. He qualified for the International Championship by beating Gary Wilson 6–3 and then won a match at a ranking event for the first time in his career by eliminating Noppon Saengkham 6–4, before losing by a reversal of this scoreline to David Gilbert. He made it through to the second round of the UK Championship with a 6–2 victory over Cao Yupeng, but was then whitewashed 6–0 by world number one Mark Selby. A second last 16 showing in the European Tour events came at the Gibraltar Open and was ended by Alfie Burden, but Lines finished 35th on the Order of Merit. He also got into the top 64 at the end of the season for the first time as he was ranked 61st in the world.

==== 2016/2017 ====
At the 2016 Indian Open, Lines reached the last 16 of a ranking event for the first time by beating Graeme Dott 4–1 and Andrew Higginson 4–2, but lost 4–2 to Shaun Murphy. After defeating Martin O'Donnell at the UK Championship, Lines knocked out world number three Judd Trump 6–2 and said it was the first time he had played well in a televised match. He reached the last 16 for the second time this season by dispatching Jimmy Robertson 6–0, but could not pick up a frame himself as Marco Fu won 6–0. After losing 4–0 in the third round of the Scottish Open, Lines lost five of his six matches in the remainder of the season.

==== 2024/2025 ====
At the 2024 British Open, Lines reached his first ever ranking semi-final, losing 0‍–‍6 to John Higgins.

== Performance and rankings timeline ==
Tournament	2013/ 14	2014/ 15	2015/ 16	2016/ 17	2017/ 18	2018/ 19	2019/ 20	2020/ 21	2021/ 22	2022/ 23	2023/ 24	2024/ 25	2025/ 26	2026/ 27
Ranking (Note: It shows the ranking at the beginning of the season)	(Note: He was an amateur)	(Note: New players on the Main Tour don't have a ranking)	78	61	62	(Note: Players qualified One Year Ranking List started the season without ranking points)	78	(Note: Players qualified through Q School started the season without ranking points)	72	57	59		67	53
Ranking tournaments
Championship League	Non-Ranking Event							RR	2R	RR	RR	RR	RR	RR
China Open	A	LQ	LQ	LQ	LQ	1R	Tournament Not Held							LQ
Wuhan Open	Tournament Not Held										1R	LQ	LQ	LQ
British Open	Tournament Not Held								3R	LQ	2R	SF	2R	LQ
English Open	Not Held			1R	1R	2R	1R	2R	1R	1R	3R	2R	LQ	2R
Shenzhen Open (Note: The event was called the Xi'an Grand Prix (2024/2025–2025/2026))	Tournament Not Held											LQ	3R	LQ
Northern Ireland Open	Not Held			1R	2R	1R	1R	1R	2R	LQ	LQ	3R	1R	LQ
International Championship	A	1R	2R	1R	2R	LQ	LQ	Not Held			1R	LQ	1R	3R
UK Championship	A	1R	2R	4R	2R	1R	1R	2R	1R	LQ	LQ	LQ	LQ	
Shoot Out	Non-Ranking			1R	1R	3R	1R	1R	4R	1R	4R	1R	3R	
Scottish Open	Not Held			3R	1R	1R	1R	1R	1R	LQ	1R	LQ	1R	
German Masters	A	LQ	LQ	LQ	LQ	LQ	LQ	LQ	LQ	LQ	LQ	LQ	LQ	LQ
Welsh Open	A	1R	1R	1R	2R	2R	1R	2R	LQ	LQ	1R	LQ	LQ	
World Grand Prix	NH	NR	DNQ	DNQ	DNQ	DNQ	DNQ	DNQ	DNQ	DNQ	DNQ	DNQ	DNQ	
Players Championship (Note: The event was called the Players Tour Championship Grand Final (2013/2014–2015/2016))	DNQ	1R	DNQ	DNQ	DNQ	DNQ	DNQ	DNQ	DNQ	DNQ	DNQ	DNQ	DNQ	
World Open	A	Not Held		1R	1R	LQ	LQ	Not Held			LQ	LQ	LQ	
Tour Championship	Tournament Not Held					DNQ	DNQ	DNQ	DNQ	DNQ	DNQ	DNQ	DNQ	
World Championship	A	LQ	LQ	LQ	LQ	LQ	LQ	LQ	LQ	LQ	LQ	LQ	LQ	
Non-ranking tournaments
Championship League	A	A	A	A	A	A	RR	A	A	A	A	A	RR	
Former ranking tournaments
Wuxi Classic	A	1R	Tournament Not Held											
Australian Goldfields Open	LQ	LQ	LQ	Tournament Not Held										
Shanghai Masters	A	LQ	LQ	LQ	LQ	Non-Ranking		Not Held			Non-Ranking Event			
Paul Hunter Classic	Minor-Ranking			1R	1R	1R	NR	Tournament Not Held						
Indian Open	A	LQ	NH	3R	LQ	3R	Tournament Not Held							
Riga Masters (Note: The event was called the Riga Open (2014/2015–2015/2016))	NH	Minor-Rank		LQ	2R	2R	1R	Tournament Not Held						
China Championship	Not Held			NR	1R	LQ	LQ	Tournament Not Held						
WST Pro Series	Tournament Not Held							2R	Tournament Not Held					
Turkish Masters	Tournament Not Held								QF	Tournament Not Held				
Gibraltar Open	Not Held		MR	1R	3R	1R	3R	2R	2R	Tournament Not Held				
WST Classic	Tournament Not Held									QF	Tournament Not Held			
European Masters	Not Held			LQ	1R	1R	LQ	1R	LQ	1R	LQ	Not Held		
Saudi Arabia Masters	Tournament Not Held											2R	6R	NH
Former non-ranking tournaments
Six-red World Championship	A	A	A	A	A	A	A	Not Held		LQ	Tournament Not Held			

Performance Table Legend
LQ	lost in the qualifying draw	#R	lost in the early rounds of the tournament (WR = Wildcard round, RR = Round robin)	QF	lost in the quarter-finals
SF	lost in the semi-finals	F	lost in the final	W	won the tournament
DNQ	did not qualify for the tournament	A	did not participate in the tournament	WD	withdrew from the tournament

NH / Not Held	means an event was not held.
NR / Non-Ranking Event	means an event is/was no longer a ranking event.
R / Ranking Event	means an event is/was a ranking event.
MR / Minor-Ranking Event	means an event is/was a minor-ranking event.

== Career finals ==
=== Minor-ranking finals: 1 ===
Outcome	Year	Championship	Opponent in the final	Score
Runner-up	2014	Haining Open	(England) Stuart Bingham	0–4

=== Pro–am finals: 1 (1 title) ===
Outcome	Year	Championship	Opponent in the final	Score
Winner	2024	Pink Ribbon	(England) Elliot Slessor	4–3

=== Amateur finals: 1 (1 title) ===
Outcome	Year	Championship	Opponent in the final	Score
Winner	2014	European Under-21 Snooker Championship	(Republic of Ireland) Josh Boileau	6–1
