= Brandon Sargeant =

English snooker player

Personal information
- Born: 28 June 1997 (age 29) Stoke-on-Trent, Staffordshire, England

Sport
- Country: England
- Sport: Snooker
- Professional: 2019–2021
- Highest ranking: 91 (September 2020)
- Best ranking finish: Last 32 (x2)

Brandon Sargeant (born 28 June 1997) is an English former professional snooker player.

== Career ==
Sargeant earned his place on the main tour after finishing top of the Challenge Tour 2018/2019 ranking list, earning him a two-year card for the 2019–20 and 2020/2021 seasons. The leading two in the rankings earned cards and he was certain of his place in the top two even before the final event. Prior to the draw for the final event, he led the rankings and only David Grace and Mitchell Mann could catch him. Sargeant could only drop to third if both Grace and Mann reached the final. However, when Grace and Mann were drawn in the same half of the draw, Sargeant was guaranteed his place in the top two.

== Performance and rankings timeline ==
Tournament	2014/ 15	2015/ 16	2016/ 17	2017/ 18	2018/ 19	2019/ 20	2020/ 21
Ranking (Note: It shows the ranking at the beginning of the season.)	(Note: He was an amateur)					(Note: New players on the Main Tour don't have a ranking)	91
Ranking tournaments
European Masters	Not Held		LQ	A	A	LQ	1R
English Open	Not Held		1R	A	A	2R	1R
Championship League	Non-Ranking Event						RR
Northern Ireland Open	Not Held		A	A	A	1R	1R
UK Championship	A	A	A	A	A	1R	1R
Scottish Open	Not Held		1R	A	A	1R	2R
World Grand Prix	NR	DNQ	DNQ	DNQ	DNQ	DNQ	DNQ
German Masters	A	A	LQ	A	A	LQ	LQ
Shoot-Out	Non-Ranking		1R	A	1R	3R	1R
Welsh Open	A	A	A	A	A	2R	1R
Players Championship (Note: The event was called the Players Tour Championship Grand Finals (2011/2012–2012/2013))	DNQ	DNQ	DNQ	DNQ	DNQ	DNQ	DNQ
Gibraltar Open	NH	MR	1R	3R	A	1R	1R
WST Pro Series	Tournament Not Held						RR
Tour Championship	Tournament Not Held				DNQ	DNQ	DNQ
World Championship	LQ	LQ	A	A	LQ	LQ	LQ
Former ranking tournaments
Australian Goldfields Open	LQ	LQ	Tournament Not Held				
Shanghai Masters	A	A	LQ	A	Non-Ranking		NH
Indian Open	A	NH	LQ	A	A	Not Held	
Paul Hunter Classic	Minor-Ranking		1R	1R	LQ	NR	NH
Riga Masters (Note: The event was called the Riga Open (2014/2015–2015/2016))	Minor-Ranking		LQ	A	A	1R	NH
International Championship	LQ	A	LQ	A	A	LQ	NH
China Championship	Not Held		NR	A	A	LQ	NH
World Open	Not Held		LQ	A	A	LQ	NH

Performance Table Legend
LQ	lost in the qualifying draw	#R	lost in the early rounds of the tournament (WR = Wildcard round, RR = Round robin)	QF	lost in the quarter-finals
SF	lost in the semi-finals	F	lost in the final	W	won the tournament
DNQ	did not qualify for the tournament	A	did not participate in the tournament	WD	withdrew from the tournament

NH / Not Held	means an event was not held.
NR / Non-Ranking Event	means an event is/was no longer a ranking event.
R / Ranking Event	means an event is/was a ranking event.
MR / Minor-Ranking Event	means an event is/was a minor-ranking event.

== Career finals ==
=== Amateur finals: 4 (2 titles) ===
Outcome	No.	Year	Championship	Opponent in the final	Score
Runner-up	1.	2016	European Under-21 Snooker Championship	(Republic of Ireland) Josh Boileau	1–6
Winner	1.	2018	Challenge Tour - Event 1	(England) Luke Simmonds	3–1
Runner-up	2.	2018	Challenge Tour - Event 5	(England) David Lilley	1–3
Winner	2.	2019	English Amateur Championship	(England) Jamie O'Neill	10–7
