= Josh Boileau =

Irish snooker player (born 1995)

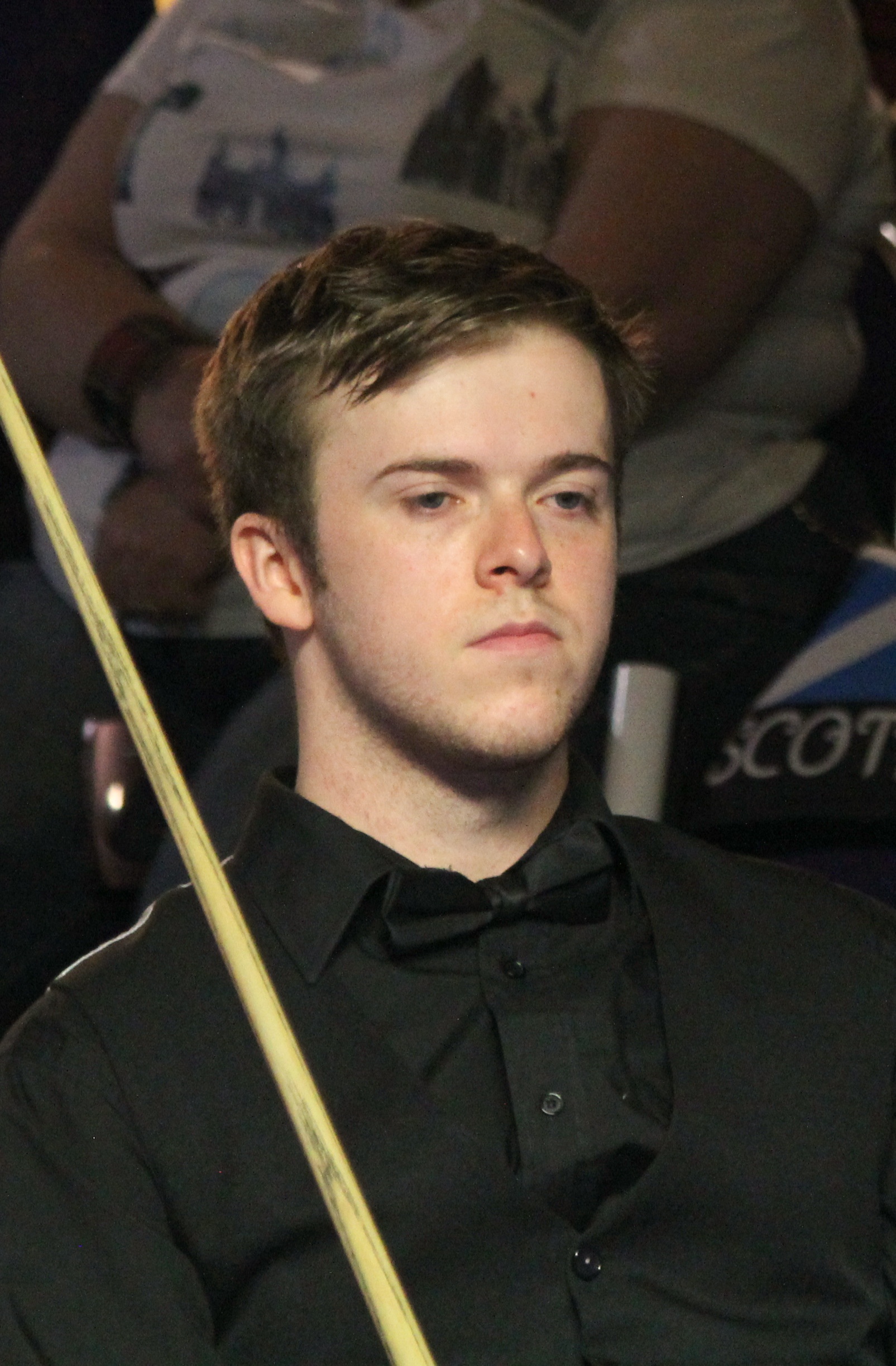
- Paul Hunter Classic 2016

Personal information
- Born: 2 July 1995 (age 31) Newbridge, County Kildare

Sport
- Country: Ireland
- Sport: Snooker
- Professional: 2016–2018
- Highest ranking: 88 (June 2017)
- Best ranking finish: Last 32 (x2)

Josh Boileau (born 2 July 1995) is an Irish former professional snooker player. He is the 2016 Under-21 European Snooker Champion.

== Career ==
In 2014, Boileau entered the EBSA European Under-21 Snooker Championships in Bucharest where he reached the final, before he lost 6–1 Oliver Lines. Two years following his disappointment in Bucharest, Boileau once again made it to the final where he defeated Brandon Sargeant 6–1 to win the 2016 EBSA European Under-21 Snooker Championship, and as a result, he was given a two-year card on the professional World Snooker Tour for the 2016–17 and 2017–18 seasons. His first win at the venue stage of a ranking event was at the Northern Ireland Open when he edged past Mike Dunn 4–3. Boileau then saw off Hamza Akbar 4–2, before losing 4–1 to Kurt Maflin. He overcame Hammad Miah 4–1 at the Welsh Open to set up a second round meeting with Shaun Murphy, who Boileau said inspired him to start playing snooker after he watched him win the World Championship in 2005. Boileau beat the world number six 4–2, but then lost 4–0 to Robert Milkins.

== Performance and rankings timeline ==
Tournament	2013/ 14	2014/ 15	2015/ 16	2016/ 17	2017/ 18
Ranking (Note: It shows the ranking at the beginning of the season.)	(Note: He was not on Main Tour.)			(Note: New players on the Main Tour don't have a ranking.)	87
Ranking tournaments
Riga Masters (Note: The event was called the Riga Open (2014/2015−2015/2016))	NH	Minor-Rank.		LQ	LQ
China Championship	Tournament Not Held			NR	LQ
Paul Hunter Classic	Minor-Ranking Event			1R	1R
Indian Open	A	A	NH	A	1R
World Open	LQ	Not Held		LQ	LQ
European Masters	Tournament Not Held			LQ	LQ
English Open	Tournament Not Held			1R	1R
International Championship	A	A	A	A	LQ
Shanghai Masters	A	A	A	LQ	LQ
Northern Ireland Open	Tournament Not Held			3R	1R
UK Championship	A	A	A	1R	1R
Scottish Open	NH	Not Held		1R	1R
German Masters	A	A	A	LQ	LQ
Shoot-Out	Variant Format Event			1R	2R
World Grand Prix	NH	NR	DNQ	DNQ	DNQ
Welsh Open	A	A	A	3R	1R
Gibraltar Open	Not Held		MR	1R	WD
Players Championship (Note: The event was called the Players Championship Grand Final (2013/2014−2015/2016))	DNQ	DNQ	DNQ	DNQ	DNQ
China Open	A	A	A	LQ	LQ
World Championship	A	A	LQ	LQ	LQ
Former ranking tournaments
Australian Goldfields Open	LQ	A	A	Not Held	

Performance Table Legend
LQ	lost in the qualifying draw	#R	lost in the early rounds of the tournament (WR = Wildcard round, RR = Round robin)	QF	lost in the quarter-finals
SF	lost in the semi-finals	F	lost in the final	W	won the tournament
DNQ	did not qualify for the tournament	A	did not participate in the tournament	WD	withdrew from the tournament

NH / Not Held	means an event was not held.
NR / Non-Ranking Event	means an event is/was no longer a ranking event.
R / Ranking Event	means an event is/was a ranking event.
MR / Minor-Ranking Event	means an event is/was a minor-ranking event.

== Career finals ==
=== Amateur finals: 4 (1 title) ===
Outcome	No.	Year	Championship	Opponent in the final	Score
Runner-up	1.	2014	European Under-21 Snooker Championship	(England) Oliver Lines	1–6
Runner-up	2.	2014	World Under-21 Snooker Championship	(Iran) Hossein Vafaei	3–8
Winner	1.	2016	European Under-21 Snooker Championship	(England) Brandon Sargeant	6–1
Runner-up	3.	2019	Irish Amateur Championship	(Republic of Ireland) David Morris	3–7
