= European Billiards and Snooker Association =

- Sport: Snooker and English billiards (amateur)
- Jurisdiction: European
- Abbreviation: EBSA

Official website
- ebsa.tv

The European Billiards and Snooker Association (EBSA) is the governing body responsible for organizing and developing snooker and English billiards across Europe.

== Overview ==
It oversees the European Snooker Championships for amateurs, juniors, women, and seniors, providing players with opportunities to compete at a high level and qualify for the World Snooker Tour. The EBSA works closely with national federations to promote the sport and strengthen its amateur scene.

The organization operates under the supervision of the World Snooker Federation (WSF) and the International Billiards and Snooker Federation (IBSF).

== Competitions ==
- EBSA European Snooker Championship
  - EBSA European Under-21 Snooker Championship
  - EBSA European Under-18 Snooker Championship
  - EBSA European Under-16 Snooker Championship
- EBSA Team Championships
- EBSA Shoot Out
