= 2023 Snooker Shoot Out =

2023 Snooker Shoot Out may refer to:

- 2023 Snooker Shoot Out (2022–23 season), a ranking snooker tournament held in January 2023.
- 2023 Snooker Shoot Out (2023–24 season), a ranking snooker tournament held in December 2023.
