= ABSC All Africa Snooker Championships =

Snooker tournament

ABSC All Africa Snooker Championship
Tournament information
- Established: 1993; 33 years ago
- Organisation(s): African Billiards & Snooker Confederation
- Format: Amateur event
- Recent edition: 2026
- Current champion: Mina Awad (EGY)

The ABSC All Africa Snooker Championship is an annual snooker competition and is the highest ranking amateur event in Africa. The event series is sanctioned by the African Billiards & Snooker Confederation. Established back in 1993 as the ABSF African Snooker Championship, the winner of the event often becomes the African nomination for the World Snooker Tour. Throughout the tournament's early history the championship was dominated by South African players, however at the turn of the millennium Egyptian players became the dominant force in the championship, winning 11 of 15 championships since the year 2000.

The championship is currently held by Mina Awad who defeated Charl Jonck 6–5 in the 2026 final.

== Men's finals ==
Year	Venue	Winner	Runner-up	Score
1993	Unknown	(Mauritius) Ismael Teeluck	Unknown	
1994	Port Louis, Mauritius	(South Africa) Bernie Jones	(South Africa) Schalk Mouton	11–10
1995	Durban, South Africa	(South Africa) Warren Horsley	(South Africa) Bernie Jones	11–8
1996	South Africa	(South Africa) Hitesh Naran	(South Africa) Warren Horsley	11–8
1997–1998	Unknown			
1999	Cairo, Egypt	(South Africa) Warren Horsley	(South Africa) Munier Cassim	6–5
2000	Casablanca, Morocco	(Egypt) Mohamed El Hamy	(Egypt) Sherif Senna	5–4
2001	Unknown			
2002	Cairo, Egypt	(Egypt) Hesham Abbas	(Egypt) Wael Talaat	5–2
2003–2006	Unknown			
2007	Casablanca, Morocco	(Egypt) Wael Talaat	(Egypt) Mohamed Samy Elkhayat	5–4
2008	Tripoli, Libya	(Egypt) Mohamed El Hamy	(Egypt) Mohamed Samy Elkhayat	6–2
2009	Johannesburg, South Africa	(Egypt) Wael Talaat	(Egypt) Mohamed Samy Elkhayat	6–0
2010	Cairo, Egypt	(Egypt) Mohamed Samy Elkhayat	(Egypt) Wael Talaat	6–1
2011	Cairo, Egypt	(Egypt) Wael Talaat	(Egypt) Mohamed El Hamy	6–4
2012	Johannesburg, South Africa	(South Africa) Peter Francisco	(Egypt) Mohamed Khairy	6–2
2013	Marrakesh, Morocco	(South Africa) Peter Francisco	(Libya) Khaled Belaid Abumdas	6–2
2014	Unknown			
2015	Tunis, Tunisia	(Egypt) Hatem Yassen	(Egypt) Mohamed Khairy	6–5
2016	Sharm El Sheikh, Egypt	(South Africa) Peter Francisco	(Egypt) Wael Talaat	6–1
2017	Hammamet, Tunisia	(Egypt) Basem Eltahhan	(Egypt) Wael Talaat	6–5
2018	Cairo, Egypt	(Egypt) Mohamed Ibrahim	(Egypt) Mostafa Dorgham	6–1
2019	Rabat, Morocco	(Morocco) Amine Amiri	(Egypt) Abdelhamid Abdelrahman	5–4
2022	Casablanca, Morocco	(Egypt) Mohamed Ibrahim	(Egypt) Hesham Shawky	5–4
2023	Casablanca, Morocco	(Egypt) Mostafa Dorgham	(Egypt) Mohamed Khairy	5–2
2024	Johannesburg, South Africa	(Egypt) Hatem Yassen	(Egypt) Abdel Shaheen	6–5
2025	Saïdia, Morocco	(Egypt) Mahmoud El Hareedy	(Morocco) Yassine Bellamine	6–1
2026	Johannesburg, South Africa	(Egypt) Mina Awad	Charl Jonck	6–5

=== Champions by country ===
Champions by country
Country	Players	Total	First title	Last title
Egypt	10	15	2000	2026
South Africa	4	7	1994	2016
Mauritius	1	1	1993	1993
Morocco	1	1	2019	2019

== Women's finals ==
Year	Venue	Winner	Runner-up	Score	Ref.
2015	Tunis, Tunisia	Jeanne Young (ZA)		Round-robin	
2022	Casablanca, Morocco	Yousra Matine (MAR)	Zineb Likaimi (MAR)	3–0	
2023	Casablanca, Morocco	Bennani Hind (MAR)	Yasmine Yathrib (MAR)	3–0	
2024	Johannesburg, South Africa	Chantelle Perry (ZA)	Amy-Claire King (ZA)	3–1	
2025	Saïdia, Morocco	Yousra Matine (MAR)	Lazim Loubna (MAR)	4–3	
2026	Johannesburg, South Africa	Michelle Rabe (ZA)	Nishami Surajlall (ZA)	3–1	

=== Champions by country ===
Champions by country
Country	Players	Total	First title	Last title
Morocco	2	3	2022	2025
South Africa	3	3	2015	2026
