= 2013 International Championship =

Tournament information
- Dates: 27 October – 3 November 2013
- Venue: Chengdu Eastern Music Park
- City: Chengdu
- Country: China
- Organisation: World Snooker
- Format: Ranking event
- Total prize fund: £625,000
- Winner's share: £125,000
- Highest break: Neil Robertson (AUS) (143); Mark Davis (ENG) (143)

Final
- Champion: Ding Junhui (CHN)
- Runner-up: Marco Fu (HKG)
- Score: 10–9

The 2013 International Championship was a professional ranking snooker tournament that took place between 27 October and 3 November 2013 at the Chengdu Eastern Music Park in Chengdu, China. It was the fifth ranking event of the 2013/2014 season.

Judd Trump was the defending champion, but he lost 5–6 against Alan McManus in the last 64.

Ding Junhui won his ninth ranking title by defeating Marco Fu 10–9 in the final. Ding became the first player to win three consecutive ranking titles since Stephen Hendry in 1993. This was also the third consecutive all-Asian ranking final, after Ding defeating Xiao Guodong at the Shanghai Masters and Aditya Mehta at the Indian Open.

== Prize fund ==
The total prize money of the event was raised to £625,000 from the previous year's £600,000. The breakdown of prize money for this year is shown below:

- Winner: £125,000
- Runner-up: £65,000
- Semi-final: £30,000
- Quarter-final: £17,500
- Last 16: £12,000
- Last 32: £7,000
- Last 64: £3,000
- Non-televised highest break: £0
- Televised highest break: £1,000
- Total: £625,000

== Wildcard round ==
These matches were played in Chengdu on 27 October 2013.

Match		Score	
WC1	Alan McManus (SCO)	6–5	Zhou Yuelong (CHN)
WC2	Jimmy White (ENG)	6–4	Yuan Sijun (CHN)
WC3	Steve Davis (ENG)	1–6	Zhao Xintong (CHN)
WC4	Kyren Wilson (ENG)	6–1	Lin Shuai (CHN)

== Main draw ==
Last 64; Best of 11 frames
(England) Judd Trump	5
(Scotland) Alan McManus	6
(England) Mike Dunn	4
(Wales) Ryan Day	6
(England) Ben Woollaston	4
(Republic of Ireland) Fergal O'Brien	6
(England) Rod Lawler	6
(India) Aditya Mehta	3
(Northern Ireland) Mark Allen	6
(China) Tian Pengfei	1
(England) Dave Harold	6
(India) Pankaj Advani	4
(England) Joe Perry	6
(Wales) Jamie Jones	5
(England) David Gilbert	6
(England) Shaun Murphy	4
(England) Barry Hawkins	6
(England) Jimmy White	2
(China) Zhao Xintong	6
(England) Craig Steadman	2
(China) Xiao Guodong	6
(England) Alfie Burden	2
(England) Adam Duffy	2
(Hong Kong) Marco Fu	6
(England) Stuart Bingham	w/o
(Finland) Robin Hull	w/d
(England) Matthew Selt	3
(England) Martin Gould	6
(England) Mark King	3
(England) Peter Lines	6
(Scotland) Jamie Burnett	0
(England) Mark Selby	6
(Australia) Neil Robertson	6
(England) Alex Davies	4
(Thailand) Thepchaiya Un-Nooh	6
(China) Zhang Anda	1
(England) Peter Ebdon	6
(England) Jack Lisowski	2
(England) Mark Joyce	w/o
(England) Ali Carter	w/d
(Scotland) John Higgins	6
(Northern Ireland) Joe Swail	2
(England) Rory McLeod	4
(Wales) Matthew Stevens	6
(England) Gary Wilson	5
(Thailand) James Wattana	6
(China) Cao Yupeng	5
(China) Ding Junhui	6
(Scotland) Stephen Maguire	3
(England) Kyren Wilson	6
(Wales) Michael White	4
(Scotland) Graeme Dott	6
(Wales) Mark Williams	6
(England) Paul Davison	2
(Norway) Kurt Maflin	6
(England) Robert Milkins	2
(England) Mark Davis	6
(England) Oliver Brown	4
(Scotland) Michael Leslie	4
(England) Stuart Carrington	6
(China) Li Yan	3
(China) Liang Wenbo	6
(Scotland) Anthony McGill	2
(England) Ronnie O'Sullivan	6

Last 32; Best of 11 frames
(Scotland) Alan McManus	4
(Wales) Ryan Day	6
(Republic of Ireland) Fergal O'Brien	6
(England) Rod Lawler	4
(Northern Ireland) Mark Allen	6
(England) Dave Harold	4
(England) Joe Perry	6
(England) David Gilbert	3
(England) Barry Hawkins	1
(China) Zhao Xintong	6
(China) Xiao Guodong	4
(Hong Kong) Marco Fu	6
(England) Stuart Bingham	6
(England) Martin Gould	4
(England) Peter Lines	4
(England) Mark Selby	6
(Australia) Neil Robertson	6
(Thailand) Thepchaiya Un-Nooh	1
(England) Peter Ebdon	6
(England) Mark Joyce	5
(Scotland) John Higgins	2
(Wales) Matthew Stevens	6
(Thailand) James Wattana	3
(China) Ding Junhui	6
(England) Kyren Wilson	1
(Scotland) Graeme Dott	6
(Wales) Mark Williams	2
(Norway) Kurt Maflin	6
(England) Mark Davis	6
(England) Stuart Carrington	3
(China) Liang Wenbo	6
(England) Ronnie O'Sullivan	4

Last 16; Best of 11 frames
(Wales) Ryan Day	6
(Republic of Ireland) Fergal O'Brien	3
(Northern Ireland) Mark Allen	4
(England) Joe Perry	6
(China) Zhao Xintong	2
(Hong Kong) Marco Fu	6
(England) Stuart Bingham	1
(England) Mark Selby	6
(Australia) Neil Robertson	5
(England) Peter Ebdon	6
(Wales) Matthew Stevens	1
(China) Ding Junhui	6
(Scotland) Graeme Dott	6
(Norway) Kurt Maflin	5
(England) Mark Davis	1
(China) Liang Wenbo	6

Quarter-finals; Best of 11 frames
(Wales) Ryan Day	1
(England) Joe Perry	6
(Hong Kong) Marco Fu	6
(England) Mark Selby	5
(England) Peter Ebdon	3
(China) Ding Junhui	6
(Scotland) Graeme Dott	6
(China) Liang Wenbo	3

Semi-finals; Best of 17 frames
(England) Joe Perry	8
(Hong Kong) Marco Fu	9
(China) Ding Junhui	9
(Scotland) Graeme Dott	7

Final; Best of 19 frames
(Hong Kong) Marco Fu	9
(China) Ding Junhui	10

== Final ==
Final: Best of 19 frames. Referee: Zheng Weili. Chengdu Eastern Music Park, Chengdu, China, 3 November 2013.
Marco Fu; Hong Kong	9–10	Ding Junhui; China
Afternoon: 61–52, 128–0 (128), 4–133 (108), 62–12, 4–92 (92), 0–138 (138), 2–127 (127), 0–126 (126), 93–22; Evening: 0–108 (108), 65–20, 105–0 (105), 76–6 (71), 0–95 (65), 105–9 (81), 8–60, 71–47, 5–64 (58), 0–99 (91)
128	Highest break	138
2	Century breaks	5
4	50+ breaks	9

== Qualifying ==
These matches took place on 1 and 2 October 2013 at the Barnsley Metrodome in Barnsley, England. All matches were best of 11 frames.

(England) Judd Trump	6–4	(China) Cao Xinlong
(Scotland) Alan McManus	6–0	(England) Darren Cook
(England) Mike Dunn	6–3	(Scotland) Scott Donaldson
(Wales) Ryan Day	6–3	(England) Chris Wakelin
(England) Ben Woollaston	6–1	(England) Lee Spick
(Republic of Ireland) Fergal O'Brien	6–2	(England) David Grace
(England) Rod Lawler	6–4	(England) Ian Burns
(England) Ricky Walden	2–6	(India) Aditya Mehta
(Northern Ireland) Mark Allen	6–2	(China) Chen Zhe
(China) Tian Pengfei	6–0	(Switzerland) Alexander Ursenbacher
(England) Dave Harold	6–5	(England) Sam Baird
(Wales) Dominic Dale	3–6	(India) Pankaj Advani
(England) Joe Perry	6–1	(Malta) Tony Drago
(Wales) Jamie Jones	6–4	(Wales) Andrew Pagett
(England) David Gilbert	6–2	(England) Sean O'Sullivan
(England) Shaun Murphy	6–0	(England) Christopher Keogan
(England) Barry Hawkins	6–1	(Scotland) Rhys Clark
(England) Jimmy White	6–3	(England) Liam Highfield
(England) Steve Davis	6–2	(England) Allan Taylor
(England) Michael Holt	1–6	(England) Craig Steadman
(China) Xiao Guodong	6–1	(Wales) Jak Jones
(England) Alfie Burden	6–4	(Wales) Daniel Wells
(England) Adam Duffy	6–5	(England) Michael Wasley
(Hong Kong) Marco Fu	6–1	(England) Robbie Williams
(England) Stuart Bingham	6–2	(Thailand) Ratchayothin Yotharuck
(China) Liu Chuang	2–6	(Finland) Robin Hull
(England) Matthew Selt	6–0	(England) Chris Norbury
(England) Martin Gould	6–1	(Scotland) Fraser Patrick
(England) Mark King	6–3	(China) Lyu Haotian
(England) Peter Lines	6–2	(England) Hammad Miah
(Scotland) Jamie Burnett	6–2	(Egypt) Mohamed Khairy
(England) Mark Selby	6–1	(England) Martin O'Donnell

(Australia) Neil Robertson	6–2	(China) Li Hang
(China) Yu Delu	5–6	(England) Alex Davies
(Northern Ireland) Gerard Greene	5–6	(Thailand) Thepchaiya Un-Nooh
(Scotland) Marcus Campbell	4–6	(China) Zhang Anda
(England) Peter Ebdon	6–2	(Thailand) Thanawat Thirapongpaiboon
(England) Jack Lisowski	6–2	(Australia) Vinnie Calabrese
(England) Mark Joyce	6–2	(England) Andrew Norman
(England) Ali Carter	6–2	(England) Barry Pinches
(Scotland) John Higgins	6–5	(England) John Astley
(Thailand) Dechawat Poomjaeng	4–6	(Northern Ireland) Joe Swail
(England) Rory McLeod	6–3	(Isle of Man) Darryl Hill
(Wales) Matthew Stevens	6–4	(England) Mitchell Travis
(England) Tom Ford	2–6	(England) Gary Wilson
(Thailand) James Wattana	6–2	(England) Jamie O'Neill
(China) Cao Yupeng	6–4	(England) James Cahill
(China) Ding Junhui	6–0	(England) Shane Castle
(Scotland) Stephen Maguire	6–1	(Republic of Ireland) David Morris
(England) Jamie Cope	1–6	(England) Kyren Wilson
(Wales) Michael White	6–4	(Malta) Alex Borg
(Scotland) Graeme Dott	6–1	(England) Elliot Slessor
(Wales) Mark Williams	6–1	(Qatar) Ahmed Saif
(England) Anthony Hamilton	3–6	(England) Paul Davison
(Norway) Kurt Maflin	6–4	(Belgium) Luca Brecel
(England) Robert Milkins	6–2	(Thailand) Noppon Saengkham
(England) Mark Davis	6–3	(England) Lee Page
(England) Nigel Bond	3–6	(England) Oliver Brown
(England) Jimmy Robertson	4–6	(Scotland) Michael Leslie
(Republic of Ireland) Ken Doherty	3–6	(England) Stuart Carrington
(England) Andrew Higginson	1–6	(China) Li Yan
(China) Liang Wenbo	6–2	(England) Ryan Clark
(Scotland) Anthony McGill	6–2	(Scotland) Ross Muir
(England) Ronnie O'Sullivan	6–1	(England) Joel Walker

== Century breaks ==
=== Qualifying stage centuries ===
- 142 – Gerard Greene
- 140, 136, 107, 105 – Neil Robertson
- 132 – Sam Baird
- 130 – Mark Allen
- 129 – Stuart Carrington
- 124 – Ryan Clark
- 123, 103 – Gary Wilson
- 121 – Robbie Williams
- 119 – Chris Wakelin
- 118 – Pankaj Advani
- 115 – Ryan Day
- 109 – David Gilbert
- 108 – Michael Leslie
- 107 – Michael Wasley
- 107 – John Astley
- 106, 103 – Stephen Maguire
- 106 – Stuart Bingham
- 106 – Liang Wenbo
- 103 – Joe Perry
- 103 – Alex Borg
- 102 – Fergal O'Brien
- 102 – Peter Ebdon
- 102 – Kurt Maflin
- 101 – Sean O'Sullivan
- 101 – Joe Swail
- 101 – Shaun Murphy
- 100 – Rod Lawler
- 100 – Daniel Wells
- 100 – Oliver Brown

=== Televised stage centuries ===
- 143, 128, 117, 100, 100, 100 – Neil Robertson
- 143 – Mark Davis
- 138, 131, 127, 126, 121, 110, 110, 108, 108 – Ding Junhui
- 137 – Craig Steadman
- 134, 115, 107, 105, 103, 103, 102 – Joe Perry
- 134 – Peter Ebdon
- 128, 116, 112, 105, 103 – Marco Fu
- 127 – Matthew Selt
- 126, 121 – Graeme Dott
- 126 – Stephen Maguire
- 125 – Shaun Murphy
- 123, 111 – Mark Allen
- 123, 103 – Fergal O'Brien
- 122 – Kyren Wilson
- 121, 120 – Ronnie O'Sullivan
- 118, 111 – Liang Wenbo
- 116, 107 – Mark Selby
- 114 – Barry Hawkins
- 110, 102 – Judd Trump
- 110 – Zhang Anda
- 109 – Zhao Xintong
- 109 – Stuart Bingham
- 107 – Joe Swail
- 106 – Zhou Yuelong
- 106 – Kurt Maflin
- 105 – John Higgins
- 104 – Dave Harold
- 103 – Xiao Guodong
- 103 – Rod Lawler
- 103 – Ryan Day
- 100 – David Gilbert
