= Lee Walker =

Welsh snooker player and coach

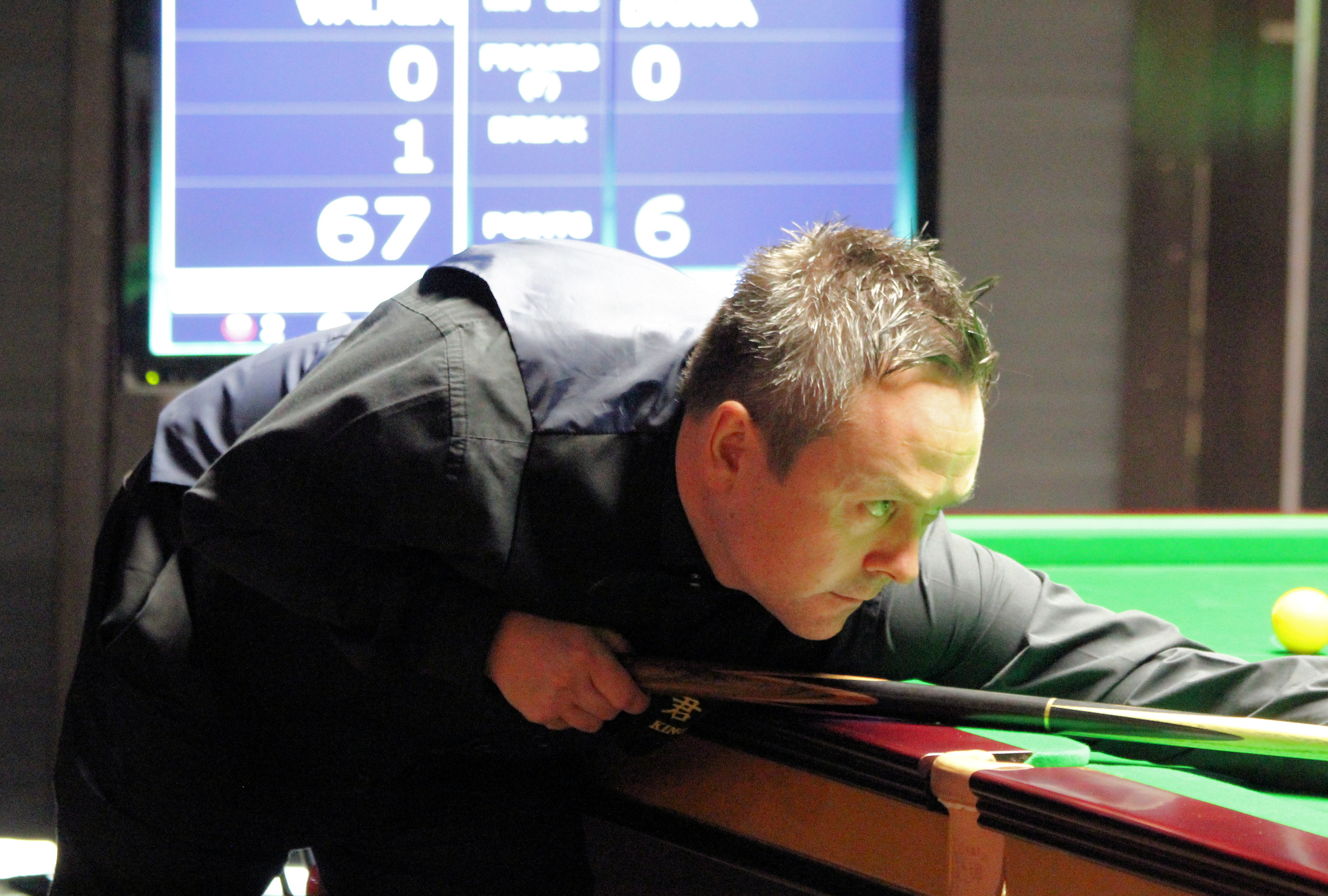
- Walker at the 2018 Paul Hunter Classic

Personal information
- Born: 11 February 1976 (age 50) Rhyl, Wales

Sport
- Country: Wales
- Sport: Snooker
- Professional: 1994–2006, 2007/2008, 2014–2022
- Highest ranking: 42 (2000/2001)
- Best ranking finish: Semi-final (x1)

Lee Walker (born 11 February 1976) is a Welsh retired professional snooker player and former World Seniors Champion. He is an official WPBSA coach and is the long-term coach of Mark Williams.

== Career ==
After turning professional in 1994 at the age of 18, Walker reached the quarter-finals of the World Championship in 1997, with victories over Dave Harold 10–7 and Alan McManus 13–10, before he lost 13–8 to Alain Robidoux. This was the first time he had reached the latter stages of a ranking tournament, and he also reached the last 16 of the same tournament in 2004 with a 10–7 win over Stephen Lee before losing 13–5 to David Gray. He dropped off the Main Tour after the 2005–2006 season, but returned a year later after a strong campaign on the Pontin's International Open Series, from which the top 8 finishers gain Main Tour places. However he dropped off again at the end of the season.

Walker did however return to the tour in 2014 as he won a 2-year tour card by reaching the semi-final stage of the second event of the 2014 Q School.

=== 2016/2017 season ===
In 2016–17, he had one of his most impressive seasons to date, the highlight being his run in his home tournament, the Welsh Open. He defeated Rhys Clark, and former world champions Neil Robertson and Graeme Dott before losing in the fourth round to Zhou Yuelong.

=== 2017/2018 season ===
In the 2017–18 season, Walker had his best run in a ranking event to date, reaching the semi-finals of the 2018 Gibraltar Open where he was defeated 4–2 by eventual runner-up Cao Yupeng.

=== 2021/2022 season ===
Walker won the 2022 World Seniors Championship at the Crucible Theatre. He recovered from 0–3 down to defeat the defending champion David Lilley in the semi-finals, and then came from 1–3 and 2–4 behind to defeat three-time champion Jimmy White 5–4 in the final. Walker became the 11th different winner of the World Seniors Championship.

=== 2022/2023 season ===
Walker chose not to enter any tournament in the season, except the invitational Champion of Champions. After losing his first round match against Mark Selby, he announced that he had already retired from all activities on the main tour, due to business and coaching obligations.

== Performance and rankings timeline ==
Tournament	1994/ 95	1995/ 96	1996/ 97	1997/ 98	1998/ 99	1999/ 00	2000/ 01	2001/ 02	2002/ 03	2003/ 04	2004/ 05	2005/ 06	2007/ 08	2012/ 13	2014/ 15	2015/ 16	2016/ 17	2017/ 18	2018/ 19	2019/ 20	2020/ 21	2021/ 22	2022/ 23
Ranking	(Note: New players on the Main Tour don't have a ranking)	280	189	79	50	46	42	58	76	81	59	58		(Note: He was an amateur)		83	(Note: Players qualified through European Tour Order of Merit started the season without prize money ranking points)	69	(Note: Players qualified One Year Ranking List started the season without ranking points)	80	(Note: Players qualified through Q School started the season without ranking points)	85	
Ranking tournaments
Championship League	Tournament Not Held												Non-Ranking Event								RR	RR	A
European Masters (Note: The event was called the European Open (1994/1995–1996/1997 and 2001/2002–2003/2004), the Irish Open (1998/1999) and the Malta Cup (2004/2005–2007/2008))	LQ	LQ	LQ	NH	1R	Not Held		LQ	LQ	LQ	LQ	LQ	NR	Not Held			LQ	LQ	1R	LQ	1R	LQ	A
British Open	LQ	LQ	LQ	1R	1R	1R	1R	LQ	LQ	LQ	LQ	Tournament Not Held										3R	A
Northern Ireland Open	Tournament Not Held																2R	1R	2R	1R	1R	1R	A
UK Championship	LQ	LQ	LQ	LQ	1R	3R	LQ	LQ	LQ	LQ	LQ	LQ	LQ	A	1R	1R	1R	1R	1R	1R	1R	WD	A
Scottish Open (Note: The event was called the International Open (1994/1995–1996/1997) and the Players Championship (2003/2004))	LQ	LQ	LQ	LQ	1R	1R	LQ	LQ	LQ	LQ	Not Held			MR	Not Held		1R	1R	2R	1R	2R	1R	A
English Open	Tournament Not Held																2R	1R	2R	QF	1R	LQ	A
World Grand Prix	Tournament Not Held														NR	DNQ	DNQ	DNQ	DNQ	DNQ	DNQ	DNQ	DNQ
Shoot Out	Tournament Not Held													Non-Ranking			1R	1R	1R	1R	1R	1R	A
German Masters (Note: The event was called the German Open (1995/1996–1997/1998))	NH	LQ	LQ	1R	NR	Tournament Not Held								A	LQ	LQ	LQ	LQ	LQ	LQ	LQ	LQ	A
Welsh Open	LQ	LQ	LQ	LQ	3R	LQ	LQ	LQ	LQ	LQ	LQ	LQ	LQ	A	2R	1R	4R	1R	1R	1R	1R	LQ	A
Players Championship (Note: The event was called the Players Tour Championship Grand Final (2012/2013 and 2014/2015–2015/2016))	Tournament Not Held													DNQ	DNQ	DNQ	DNQ	DNQ	DNQ	DNQ	DNQ	DNQ	DNQ
Tour Championship	Tournament Not Held																		DNQ	DNQ	DNQ	DNQ	DNQ
World Championship	LQ	LQ	QF	1R	LQ	LQ	LQ	LQ	LQ	2R	LQ	LQ	LQ	A	LQ	LQ	LQ	LQ	LQ	LQ	LQ	LQ	A
Non-ranking tournaments
Champion of Champions	Tournament Not Held														A	A	A	A	A	A	A	A	1R
The Masters	LQ	LQ	LQ	LQ	LQ	LQ	LQ	LQ	LQ	LQ	A	A	LQ	A	A	A	A	A	A	A	A	A	A
Championship League	Tournament Not Held												A	A	A	A	A	A	A	RR	A	A	A
Six-red World Championship	Tournament Not Held													2R	A	A	A	A	A	A	Not Held		A
World Seniors Championship	Tournament Not Held													A	LQ	A	A	A	NH	A	1R	W	1R
Former ranking tournaments
Dubai Classic (Note: The event was called the Thailand Classic (1995/1996) and the Asian Classic (1996/1997))	LQ	LQ	LQ	Tournament Not Held																			
Malta Grand Prix	Non-Ranking Event					LQ	NR	Tournament Not Held															
Thailand Masters (Note: The event was called the Thailand Open (1995/1996–1996/1997))	LQ	LQ	LQ	LQ	LQ	LQ	LQ	1R	NR	Not Held			NR	Tournament Not Held									
Irish Masters	Non-Ranking Event								LQ	1R	LQ	NH	Tournament Not Held										
Northern Ireland Trophy	Tournament Not Held											NR	1R	Tournament Not Held									
Wuxi Classic (Note: The event was called the Jiangsu Classic (2008/2009–2009/2010))	Tournament Not Held													A	LQ	Tournament Not Held							
Australian Goldfields Open (Note: The event was called the Australian Masters (1994/1995-1995/1996))	Non-Ranking		Tournament Not Held											A	LQ	LQ	Tournament Not Held						
Shanghai Masters	Tournament Not Held												LQ	A	LQ	LQ	LQ	1R	Non-Ranking		Not Held		
Paul Hunter Classic (Note: The event was called the Grand Prix Fürth (2004/2005) and the Fürth German Open (2005/2006–2006/2007))	Tournament Not Held										Pro-am Event			Minor-Ranking			3R	1R	QF	NR	Not Held		
Indian Open	Tournament Not Held														LQ	NH	LQ	LQ	1R	Tournament Not Held			
China Open (Note: The event was called the China International (1997/1998–1998/1999))	Not Held			NR	LQ	LQ	LQ	LQ	Not Held		LQ	LQ	WD	A	LQ	2R	LQ	1R	LQ	Tournament Not Held			
Riga Masters (Note: The event was called the Riga Open (2014/2015–2015/2016))	Tournament Not Held														MR		1R	1R	1R	1R	Not Held		
International Championship	Tournament Not Held													A	LQ	2R	1R	1R	LQ	LQ	Not Held		
China Championship	Tournament Not Held																NR	LQ	LQ	LQ	Not Held		
World Open (Note: The event was called the Grand Prix (1994/1995–2000/2001 and 2004/2005–2009/2010) and the LG Cup (2001/2002–2003/2004))	LQ	LQ	LQ	LQ	LQ	LQ	LQ	LQ	LQ	3R	1R	2R	LQ	A	Not Held		1R	3R	1R	LQ	Not Held		
WST Pro Series	Tournament Not Held																				RR	Not Held	
Turkish Masters	Tournament Not Held																					LQ	NH
Gibraltar Open	Tournament Not Held															MR	3R	SF	1R	2R	1R	1R	NH
Former non-ranking tournaments
Champions Cup (Note: The event was called the Charity Challenge (1994/1995–1998/1999))	A	A	A	1R	A	A	A	A	Tournament Not Held														

Performance Table Legend
LQ	lost in the qualifying draw	#R	lost in the early rounds of the tournament (WR = Wildcard round, RR = Round robin)	QF	lost in the quarter-finals
SF	lost in the semi-finals	F	lost in the final	W	won the tournament
DNQ	did not qualify for the tournament	A	did not participate in the tournament	WD	withdrew from the tournament

NH / Not Held	means an event was not held.
NR / Non-Ranking Event	means an event is/was no longer a ranking event.
R / Ranking Event	means an event is/was a ranking event.
MR / Minor-Ranking Event	means an event is/was a minor-ranking event.
PA / Pro-am Event	means an event is/was a pro-am event.

== Career finals ==
=== Non-ranking finals: 1 ===
Outcome	No.	Year	Championship	Opponent in the final	Score
Runner-up	1.	1998	Merseyside Professional Championship	(England) Peter Lines	4–5

=== Pro-am finals: 2 (1 title) ===
Outcome	No.	Year	Championship	Opponent in the final	Score
Winner	1.	2008	TCC Open Snooker Championship	(Wales) Mark Williams	7–5
Runner-up	1.	2014	Pink Ribbon	(England) Peter Lines	1–4

=== Amateur finals: 4 ===
Outcome	No.	Year	Championship	Opponent in the final	Score
Runner-up	1.	2006	PIOS – Event 3	(Republic of Ireland) Leo Fernandez	5–6
Runner-up	2.	2007	PIOS – Event 4	(England) Kuldesh Johal	4–6
Runner-up	3.	2011	IBSF World Snooker Championship	(Iran) Hossein Vafaei	9–10
Runner-up	4.	2014	Welsh Amateur Championship	(Wales) Jamie Clarke	6–8

=== Seniors finals: 1 (1 title) ===
Outcome	No.	Year	Championship	Opponent in the final	Score
Winner	1.	2022	World Seniors Championship	(England) Jimmy White	5–4
