= Mostafa Dorgham =

Egyptian snooker player

Personal information
- Born: 10 January 1996 (age 30) Cairo, Egypt

Sport
- Country: Egypt
- Sport: Snooker
- Professional: 2023–2025
- Highest ranking: 90 (July 2024)
- Best ranking finish: Last 64 (x2)

Mostafa Dorgham (born 10 January 1996) is an Egyptian former professional snooker player. He earned a two-year card on to the World Snooker Tour by winning the ABSC All Africa Snooker Championship in 2023.

== Career ==
Dorgham finished as runner-up to Mohamed Ibrahim at the 2018 ABSF African Snooker Championships.

Dorgham claimed a two-year tour card on the World Snooker Tour after a 5-2 win over Mohamed Khairy in an all-Egyptian final at the African Snooker Championship held in Casablanca in June 2023.

=== 2023/24 ===
Dorgham was confirmed on the World Snooker Tour for the 2023-24 snooker season. In qualification for the 2024 Welsh Open he took Ryan Day to a decider in a 4-3 defeat in January 2024.

In the first round of qualifying for the 2024 World Snooker Championship he defeated Fergal O'Brien 10-8 in the veteran Irishman’s final match as a professional.

=== 2024/25 ===
In the qualifiers for the Wuhan Open, he pulled off an upset, winning 5-4 against Ricky Walden.

== Performance and rankings timeline ==
Tournament	2018/ 19	2023/ 24	2024/ 25
Ranking (Note: Shows the ranking at the beginning of the season)	(Note: He was an amateur)	(Note: New players on the Main Tour don't have a ranking)	91
Ranking tournaments
Championship League	NR	A	RR
Xi'an Grand Prix	Not Held		LQ
Saudi Arabia Masters	Not Held		1R
English Open	A	LQ	LQ
British Open	NH	LQ	LQ
Wuhan Open	NH	LQ	1R
Northern Ireland Open	A	LQ	LQ
International Championship	A	LQ	LQ
UK Championship	A	LQ	LQ
Shoot Out	A	2R	1R
Scottish Open	A	LQ	LQ
German Masters	A	LQ	LQ
Welsh Open	A	LQ	LQ
World Open	A	LQ	LQ
World Grand Prix	DNQ	DNQ	DNQ
Players Championship	DNQ	DNQ	DNQ
Tour Championship	DNQ	DNQ	DNQ
World Championship	LQ	LQ	LQ

Performance Table Legend
LQ	lost in the qualifying draw	#R	lost in the early rounds of the tournament (WR = Wildcard round, RR = Round robin)	QF	lost in the quarter-finals
SF	lost in the semi-finals	F	lost in the final	W	won the tournament
DNQ	did not qualify for the tournament	A	did not participate in the tournament	WD	withdrew from the tournament

NH / Not Held	means an event was not held.
NR / Non-Ranking Event	means an event is/was no longer a ranking event.
R / Ranking Event	means an event is/was a ranking event.
MR / Minor-Ranking Event	means an event is/was a minor-ranking event.
PA / Pro-am Event	means an event is/was a pro-am event.

=== Amateur finals: 3 (1 title) ===
Outcome	No.	Year	Championship	Opponent in the final	Score
Runner-up	1.	2018	African 6-red Championship	(Egypt) Mohamed Khairy	2–6
Runner-up	2.	2018	ABSF African Snooker Championships	(Egypt) Mohamed Ibrahim	1–6
Winner	1.	2022	ABSF African Snooker Championships	(Egypt) Mohamed Khairy	5–2
