= Wael Talaat =

Egyptian snooker player (1964–2025)

Personal information
- Born: 17 March 1964
- Died: 20 February 2025 (aged 60)

Sport
- Country: Egypt
- Sport: Snooker
- Professional: 1998/1999

Wael Talaat (Arabic: وائل طلعت; 17 March 1964 – 20 February 2025) was an Egyptian snooker player. He is notable for being the first man to make a 83-point break in 6-red snooker, which earned him a place in the Guinness Book of World Records. He had one season as a professional on the tour, in 1998.

Talaat won the ABSF African Snooker Championships a record three times, as well as losing in four other finals. He also took part in the 2022 World Seniors Championship, beating Maria Catalano 3–0, before losing to Jimmy White in the last 16.

Talaat died on 20 February 2025, at the age of 60.

== Performance and rankings timeline ==
Tournament	1998/ 99	2015/ 16	2021/ 22
Ranking (Note: It shows the ranking at the beginning of the season)	(Note: New players on the Main Tour don't have a ranking)	(Note: He was an amateur)	
Ranking tournaments
British Open	LQ	NH	A
UK Championship	LQ	A	A
Scottish Open	LQ	NH	A
European Masters (Note: The event was called the Irish Open (1998/1999))	LQ	NH	A
Welsh Open	LQ	A	A
World Championship	LQ	A	A
Non-ranking tournaments
World Seniors Championship	NH	A	2R
Former ranking tournaments
Grand Prix	LQ	Not Held	
Thailand Masters	LQ	Not Held	
China Open (Note: The event was called the China International (1998/1999))	LQ	A	NH
Former non-ranking tournaments
Six-red World Championship	NH	RR	NH

Performance Table Legend
LQ	lost in the qualifying draw	#R	lost in the early rounds of the tournament (WR = Wildcard round, RR = Round robin)	QF	lost in the quarter-finals
SF	lost in the semi-finals	F	lost in the final	W	won the tournament
DNQ	did not qualify for the tournament	A	did not participate in the tournament	WD	withdrew from the tournament

NH / Not Held	means an event was not held.
NR / Non-Ranking Event	means an event is/was no longer a ranking event.
R / Ranking Event	means an event is/was a ranking event.
MR / Minor-Ranking Event	means an event is/was a minor-ranking event.

== Amateur finals: 10 (6 titles) ==
Outcome	No.	Year	Championship	Opponent in the final	Score
Winner	1.	1996	Egypt Amateur Championship	(Egypt) Hitesh Bakhaty	5–3
Runner-up	1.	2002	ABSF African Snooker Championships	(Egypt) Hesham Abbas	2–5
Winner	2.	2007	ABSF African Snooker Championships	(Egypt) Mohamed Samy Elkhayat	5–4
Winner	3.	2009	ABSF African Snooker Championships (2)	(Egypt) Mohamed Samy Elkhayat	6–0
Runner-up	2.	2010	ABSF African Snooker Championships (2)	(Egypt) Mohamed Samy Elkhayat	1–6
Winner	4.	2011	African 6-red Championship	(Egypt) Mohammed el Moula	8–2
Winner	5.	2011	ABSF African Snooker Championships (3)	(Egypt) Mohammed el Hamy	6–4
Runner-up	3.	2016	ABSF African Snooker Championships (3)	(South Africa) Peter Francisco	1–6
Runner-up	4.	2017	ABSF African Snooker Championships (4)	(Egypt) Basem Eltahhan	5–6
Winner	6.	2018	African Championship - Masters	(South Africa) Abdul Mutalieb Allie	5–4
