= Mohamed Ibrahim (snooker player) =

Egyptian snooker player

Personal information
- Born: 3 March 1990 (age 36)

Sport
- Country: Egypt
- Sport: Snooker
- Professional: 2018/2019, 2022-2024
- Highest ranking: 90 (June 2023)
- Best ranking finish: Last 64 (x2)

Mohamed Ibrahim (Egyptian Arabic: محمد ابراهيم, born 3 March 1990) is an Egyptian former professional snooker player. He has twice won the African Snooker Championship.

== Career ==
As the winner of the 2018 ABSF African Snooker Championships he was awarded a place on the professional snooker tour for the 2018–19 season on a two-year card. In October 2018 Ibrahim withdrew his tour card, having not entered a single match during the season.

He previously competed at the highest level at the 2012 Six-red World Championship where he pushed eventual tournament winner Mark Davis to a deciding frame.

He won the 2022 African Snooker Championship in Casablanca, Morocco in July 2022. He secured his first win back on tour defeating Julien Leclercq in UK Championship qualifying in November 2022. He has also become the first Egyptian player to make a professional century, and won a second match to qualify for the Welsh Open.

He started the 2023-24 season at the 2023 Championship League held at the Morningside Arena in Leicester, England from 26 June 2023. In the round-Robin stage he went undefeated, drawing all three matches, including against Si Jiahui. He earned his first win of the 2023-24 season on 17 August 2023, at the British Open qualifying in Leicester, with a 4-3 win over Mink Nutcharut.

== Performance and rankings timeline ==
Tournament	2012/ 13	2018/ 19	2022/ 23	2023/ 24
Ranking (Note: It shows the ranking at the beginning of the season)	(Note: He was an amateur)	(Note: New players on the Main Tour don't have a ranking)		90
Ranking tournaments
Championship League	Non-Ranking		A	RR
European Masters	NH	A	A	LQ
British Open	Not Held		A	1R
English Open	NH	A	LQ	LQ
Wuhan Open	Not Held			LQ
Northern Ireland Open	NH	A	A	LQ
International Championship	A	A	NH	LQ
UK Championship	A	A	LQ	LQ
Shoot Out	NR	A	1R	1R
Scottish Open	MR	A	A	LQ
World Grand Prix	NH	DNQ	DNQ	DNQ
German Masters	A	A	LQ	LQ
Welsh Open	A	A	1R	LQ
Players Championship	DNQ	DNQ	DNQ	DNQ
World Open	A	A	NH	LQ
Tour Championship	NH	DNQ	DNQ	DNQ
World Championship	A	A	LQ	LQ
Former ranking tournaments
WST Classic	Not Held		1R	NH
Former non-ranking tournaments
Six-red World Championship	RR	A	LQ	NH

Performance Table Legend
LQ	lost in the qualifying draw	#R	lost in the early rounds of the tournament (WR = Wildcard round, RR = Round robin)	QF	lost in the quarter-finals
SF	lost in the semi-finals	F	lost in the final	W	won the tournament
DNQ	did not qualify for the tournament	A	did not participate in the tournament	WD	withdrew from the tournament

NH / Not Held	means an event was not held.
NR / Non-Ranking Event	means an event is/was no longer a ranking event.
R / Ranking Event	means an event is/was a ranking event.
MR / Minor-Ranking Event	means an event is/was a minor-ranking event.

== Career finals ==
=== Amateur finals: 3 (2 titles) ===
Outcome	No.	Year	Championship	Opponent in the final	Score
Winner	1.	2018	ABSF African Snooker Championships	(Egypt) Mostafa Dorgham	6–1
Winner	2.	2022	ABSF African Snooker Championships	(Egypt) Hesham Shawky	5–4
Runner-up	1.	2024	African 6-red Championship	(Egypt) Omar Ramy	4–6
