= 2022 World Seniors Championship =

2022 edition of the World Seniors snooker championship

2022 Ways Facilities Management World Seniors Championship
Tournament information
- Dates: 4–8 May 2022
- Venue: Crucible Theatre
- City: Sheffield
- Country: England
- Organisation: World Seniors Snooker
- Format: Seniors event
- Winner's share: £15,000
- Highest break: Jimmy White (ENG) (138)

Final
- Champion: Lee Walker (WAL)
- Runner-up: Jimmy White (ENG)
- Score: 5–4

The 2022 World Seniors Championship (officially the 2022 Ways Facilities Management World Seniors Snooker Championship) was a snooker tournament that took place from 4 to 8 May 2022 at the Crucible Theatre in Sheffield, England. The 13th edition of the World Seniors Championship, first held in 1991, it was organised by the World Seniors Tour. The tour is open to players aged over 40 who are not in the top 64 of the world rankings. Qualifying rounds were held from 14 to 19 December 2021 and 8 to 13 February 2022 at the Crucible Sports and Social Club in Reading. Players who had qualified for that season's cancelled Seniors Masters and Seniors Irish Masters events were invited to compete at the World Seniors Championship instead.

Dominic Dale was scheduled to participate, but he re-entered the top 64 in the world rankings after the 2022 World Championship qualifiers, rendering him ineligible to compete. Michael Holt took Dale's place as the highest ranked eligible player. Maria Catalano, who had turned 40 in February, became the first woman to reach the final stages of a seniors event. She lost 0–3 to Wael Talaat in the last 24. Stephen Hendry played competitively for the first time since his first-round defeat at the 2021 UK Championship but lost 0–3 to Lee Walker in the last 16. After losing 0–3 to Nigel Bond in the last 16, John Parrott announced his retirement from the seniors tour. He received a standing ovation as he displayed the World Championship trophy, which he won in 1991.

David Lilley was the defending champion, having defeated Jimmy White 5–3 in the 2021 final, but he lost 3–4 to Walker in the semi-finals, despite winning the first three frames. White reached a fourth consecutive final and led 3–1 and 4–2, but Walker won the last three frames to clinch a 5–4 victory and win his first seniors title. The final stage of the tournament produced three century breaks. The tournament's highest break was a 138 by White in his quarter-final match against Rory McLeod.

== Overview ==
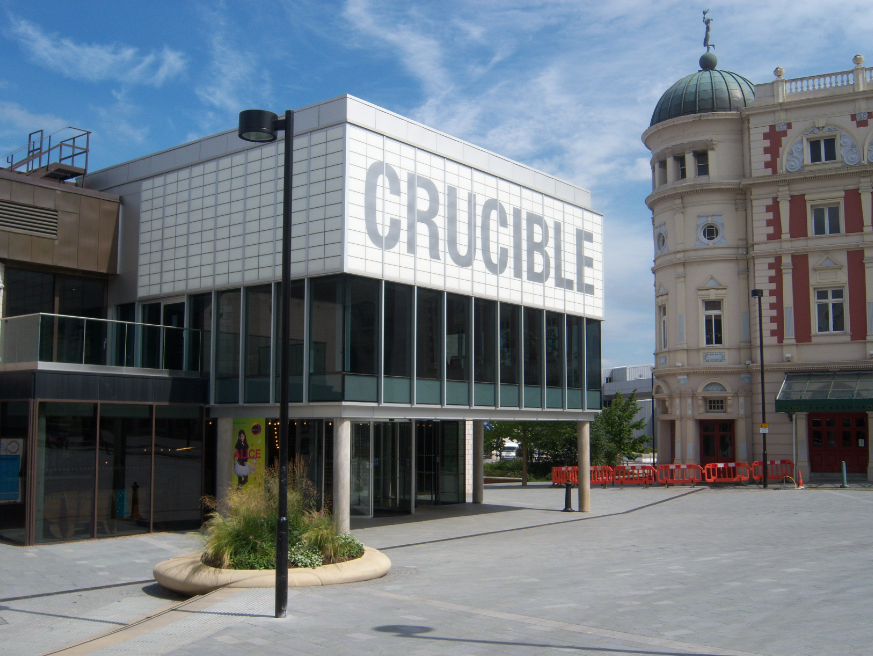
The main stage of the event was held at the Crucible Theatre in Sheffield for a fourth consecutive year.

The 2022 World Seniors Championship took place from 4 to 8 May 2022 at the Crucible Theatre in Sheffield, England. The 13th edition of the World Seniors Championship, first contested in 1991, it was held at the Crucible for the fourth consecutive year and sponsored for the first time by Ways Facilities Management. (Note: It was held in Scunthorpe in 2018, with no sponsor. It moved to the Crucible Theatre in 2019, where it also remained for the 2020 and 2021 editions. On those three occasions, ROKiT was the sponsor.) The event was broadcast domestically on the BBC and was available in all other territories on Matchroom Live.

=== Participants ===
A World Seniors Tour event, the tournament was open to players aged over 40 who were ranked outside the top 64 in the snooker world rankings.

Qualifying rounds were held from 14 to 19 December 2021 and 8 to 13 February 2022 at the Crucible Sports and Social Club in Reading. Philip Williams, Stuart Watson, Nigel Bond, and Lee Walker qualified through these events. Two regional champions, Ahmed Aly Elsayed, winner of the Pan-American Championship, and Wael Talaat, winner of the African Seniors Championship, were also awarded places in the tournament. Elsayed became the first American to play a match at the Crucible Theatre.

Players who had qualified for that season's cancelled Seniors Masters and Seniors Irish Masters events—Bob Chaperon, Wayne Cooper, Gary Filtness, Michael Judge, Rory McLeod, Darren Morgan, and Patrick Wallace—were invited to compete at the World Seniors Championship instead. Invited players included the seven-time World Champion Stephen Hendry, six time World Championship runner-up Jimmy White, and former World Champions Ken Doherty and John Parrott. Dominic Dale was scheduled to participate, but re-entered the top 64 in the world rankings after the 2022 World Championship qualifiers, rendering him ineligible. Michael Holt took Dale's place as the highest ranked eligible player. Maria Catalano, who had turned 40 in February, became the first woman to reach the final stages of a seniors event.

Referees at the tournament were Roy Gannon, Leo Scullion, Michaela Tabb, and Andy Yates.

=== Prize fund ===
The winner of the event received £15,000. The breakdown of prize money is shown below:

- Winner: £15,000
- Runner-up: £7,000
- Semi-finals: £3,000
- Quarter-finals: £2,000
- Last 16: £1,000
- Last 24: no prize money

== Summary ==
=== Last 24 ===
The round of 24 took place on 4 and 5 May, each match played as the best of five frames. Lee Walker made two half-centuries as he whitewashed Tony Knowles. Philip Williams won the first two frames of his match against the 1990 British Open winner Bob Chaperon. Chaperon won the third frame on the last black, but Williams secured a 3–1 victory in frame four. Patrick Wallace led Darren Morgan 2–1, but Morgan made a half-century to win the fourth frame on the final pink and force a decider, which he won with a 53 break.

Wayne Cooper made breaks of 54, 70, and 58 to defeat Ahmed Aly Elsayed 3‍–‍1. Michael Judge won the first frame against Gary Filtness, but Filtness won three consecutive frames for a 3–1 victory. Nigel Bond made breaks of 61 and 67 as he whitewashed Stuart Watson. Maria Catalano, the first woman to reach the final stages of a World Seniors Tour event, faced Wael Talaat, who compiled a break of 81 as he took a 2‍–‍0 lead. In the third frame, Catalano made a 50 break, but Talaat won the frame for a 3‍–‍0 victory. Rory McLeod also whitewashed Frank Sarsfield, making two half-centuries.

=== Last 16 ===
The round of 16 took place on 6 and 7 May, each match played as the best of five frames. Williams faced the defending champion David Lilley, who had defeated him in the 2022 UK Seniors Championship. Williams took a 2‍–‍0 lead, but Lilley won the third frame with a break of 60 and the match went to a deciding frame, which Lilley won after Williams missed the last red. Morgan, the winner of the 2011 edition, faced Michael Holt, who took the opening frame with a 63 break and went on to clinch a 3‍–‍1 victory. Ken Doherty, the 1997 World Champion, compiled breaks of 70 and 73 to defeat Cooper by the same score.

Stephen Hendry played competitively for the first time since his first-round defeat at the 2021 UK Championship. Walker made breaks of 121 and 63 as he whitewashed Hendry to reach the quarter-finals of the tournament for the first time. Peter Lines defeated Filtness 3‍–‍0, while Bond, the winner of the 2012 edition, whitewashed John Parrott. After the match, Parrott announced his retirement from the World Seniors Tour. He received a standing ovation at the Crucible as he displayed the World Championship trophy, which he had won in 1991. Having lost only one match in the last twelve he had played in the tournament, 60-year-old Jimmy White made breaks of 67 and 79 as he whitewashed Talaat. McLeod made an 86 break as he won the first two frames against 69-year-old Joe Johnson, the oldest player in the tournament. Johnson took the third frame with a half-century, but McLeod won the fourth for a 3–1 victory. After the contest, Johnson said "We played on the same table at the Crucible where [the] World Championship final played. It's the best place in the world to play snooker. The crowds were pretty good for a seniors event. It was electrifying."

=== Quarter-finals ===
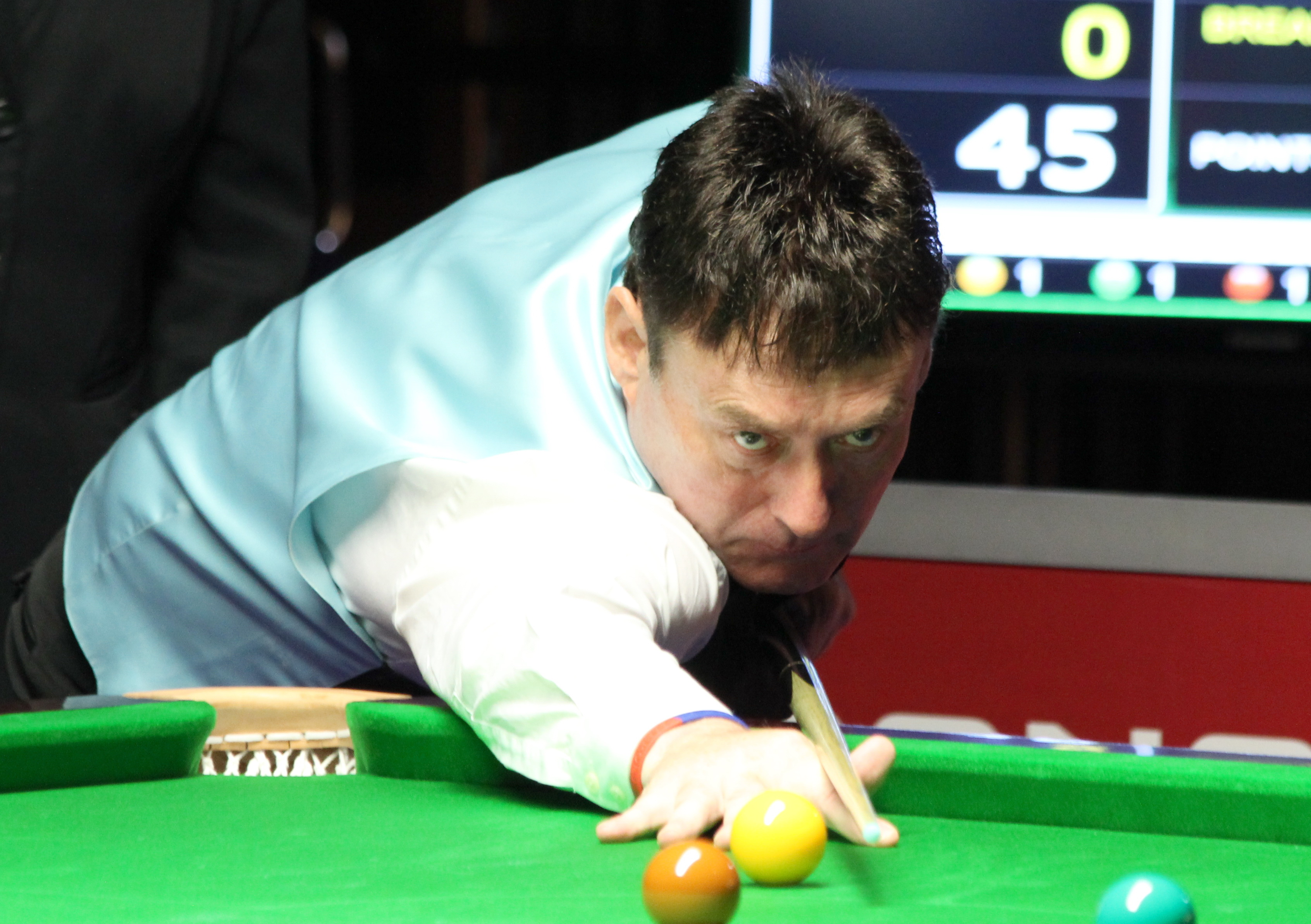
Jimmy White (pictured in 2016) produced two century breaks in the tournament. He reached the final for a fifth time, but lost 4‍–‍5 to Lee Walker.

The quarter-finals took place on 7 May, each match played as the best of seven frames. Doherty won the first two frames against Walker, but Walker made three half-centuries as he won four consecutive frames for a 4–2 victory. In the second quarter-final match, Lilley won the first frame against Holt on the final pink. Holt scored only 13 more points in the match as Lilley made breaks of 50 and 58 for a whitewash victory.

Facing McLeod, White made breaks of 53, 138, and 71 to win the first three frames. McLeod won frame four, but White sealed a 4–1 victory with a 74 break. In the last quarter-final match, Lines, winner of the 2022 UK Seniors Championship during the season, made breaks of 93 and 50 as he won the first three frames against Bond. Bond won the fourth, but Lines took the fifth for a 4–1 victory.

=== Semi-finals ===
The semi-finals took place on 8 May, each match played as the best of seven frames. White, playing in the semi-finals of the tournament for the seventh time, made breaks including 62 and 132 as he whitewashed Lines, the 2017 World Seniors Champion. In the second semi-final, Lilley took a 3‍–‍0 lead over Walker, but Walker then won four consecutive frames, clinching victory with a 73 break in the decider.

=== Final ===
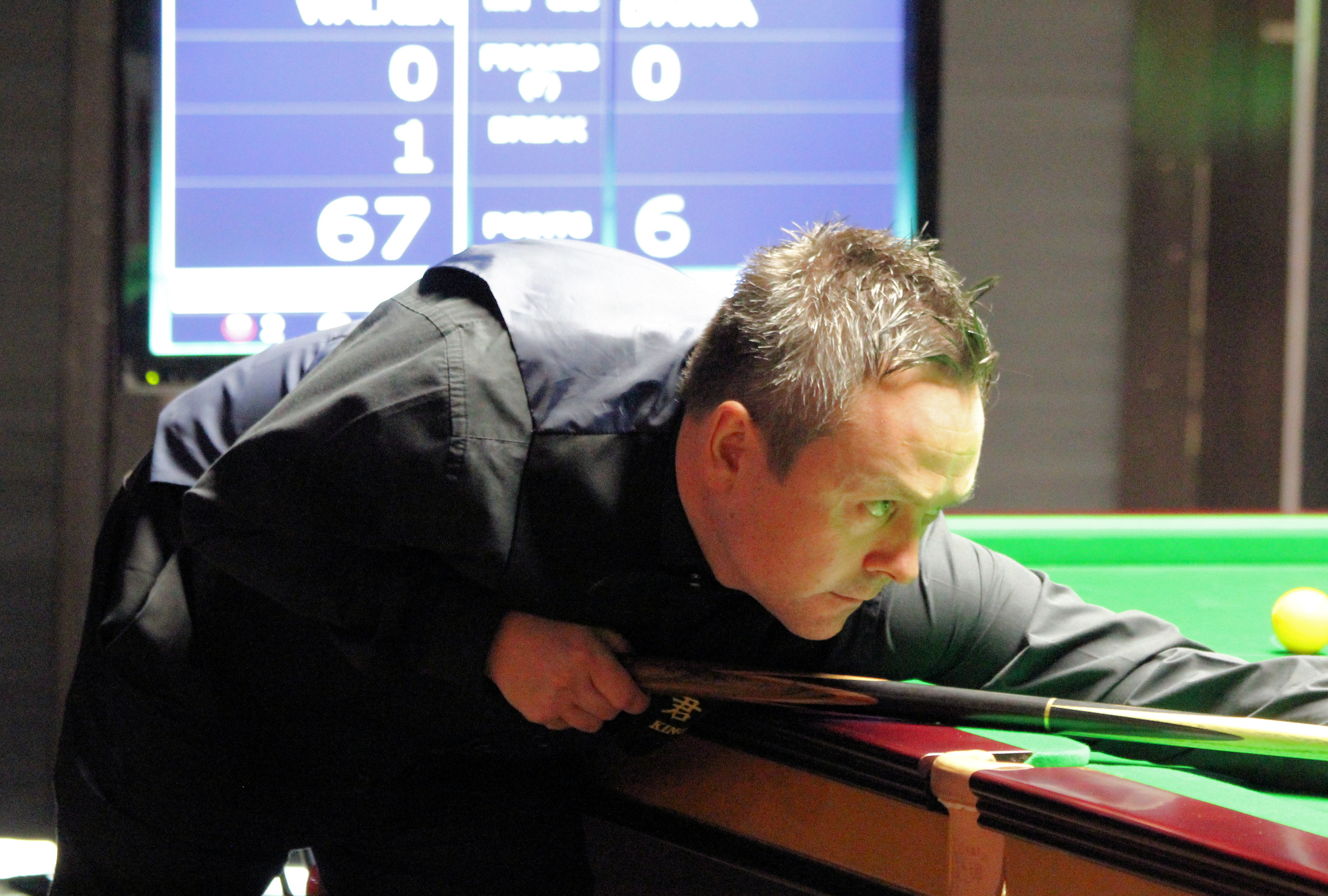
Lee Walker (pictured in 2018) defeated Jimmy White in the final to claim his first World Seniors Championship.

The final took place on 8 May as the best of nine frames. White, aged 60, played Walker, aged 46. It was White's fifth World Seniors Championship final, having previously won the tournament in 2010, 2019 and 2020. Michaela Tabb officiated the match. White led 3‍–‍1 and 4‍–‍2, but Walker then made breaks including 79 and 83 as he took three consecutive frames to win the title. It was the third consecutive match Walker had won from behind, as he had trailed Doherty 0–2 in the quarter-finals and Lilley 0–3 in the semi-finals.

Walker, who had not won a trophy during his professional career, became World Seniors Champion for the first time. He won £15,000 in prize money, while White received £7,000 as runner-up. "It's a dream come true," said Walker, who described the result as "a career highlight". "I know this isn't a ranking event, but I think my days of winning ranking tournaments are done, but I'll take this and I'll cherish it forever." He also stressed the importance of having won the title at the Crucible. "It's great, to come here and play in front of this crowd in the one-table set-up at the Crucible. Only a select few people get to play that." Walker, as World Seniors Champion, was subsequently invited to compete at the 2022 Champion of Champions after an extra place became available because some players won more than the one tournament needed to qualify.

== Main draw ==
The results for the main draw are shown below. Match winners are denoted in bold.

**Last 24**; Best of 5 frames
Bob Chaperon (CAN)	1
**Philip Williams (WAL)**	**3**
**Darren Morgan (WAL)**	**3**
Patrick Wallace (NIR)	2
Ahmed Aly Elsayed (USA)	1
**Wayne Cooper (ENG)**	**3**
**Lee Walker (WAL)**	**3**
Tony Knowles (ENG)	0
Michael Judge (IRL)	1
**Gary Filtness (ENG)**	**3**
**Nigel Bond (ENG)**	**3**
Stuart Watson (ENG)	0
Maria Catalano (ENG)	0
**Wael Talaat (EGY)**	**3**
**Rory McLeod (JAM)**	**3**
Frank Sarsfield (IRL)	0

**Last 16**; Best of 5 frames
**David Lilley (ENG)**	**3**
Philip Williams (WAL)	2
**Michael Holt (ENG)**	**3**
Darren Morgan (WAL)	1
**Ken Doherty (IRL)**	**3**
Wayne Cooper (ENG)	1
Stephen Hendry (SCO)	0
**Lee Walker (WAL)**	**3**
**Peter Lines (ENG)**	**3**
Gary Filtness (ENG)	0
John Parrott (ENG)	0
**Nigel Bond (ENG)**	**3**
**Jimmy White (ENG)**	**3**
Wael Talaat (EGY)	0
Joe Johnson (ENG)	1
**Rory McLeod (JAM)**	**3**

**Quarter-finals**; Best of 7 frames
**(England) David Lilley**	**4**
(England) Michael Holt	0
(Republic of Ireland) Ken Doherty	2
**(Wales) Lee Walker**	**4**
**(England) Peter Lines**	**4**
(England) Nigel Bond	1
**(England) Jimmy White**	**4**
(Jamaica) Rory McLeod	1

**Semi-finals**; Best of 7 frames
(England) David Lilley	3
**(Wales) Lee Walker**	**4**
(England) Peter Lines	0
**(England) Jimmy White**	**4**

**Final**; Best of 9 frames
**(Wales) Lee Walker**	**5**
(England) Jimmy White	4

=== Final ===
Final: Best of 9 frames. Referee: Michaela Tabb; Crucible Theatre, 8 May 2022
Jimmy White; England	4–**5**	**Lee Walker**; Wales
Frame scores: **99**–29 (64), 31–**71**, **73**–49, **69**–29, 40–**99** (72), **65**–27, 1–**62**, 5–**111** (79), 0–**83** (83)
64	Highest break	**83**
0	Century breaks	0
1	50+ breaks	**3**
2022 World Seniors Champion (Wales) Lee Walker

== Century breaks ==
There were three century breaks in the main stage of the World Seniors Championship.

- 138, 132 – Jimmy White
- 121 – Lee Walker
