= Basem Eltahhan =

Egyptian snooker player

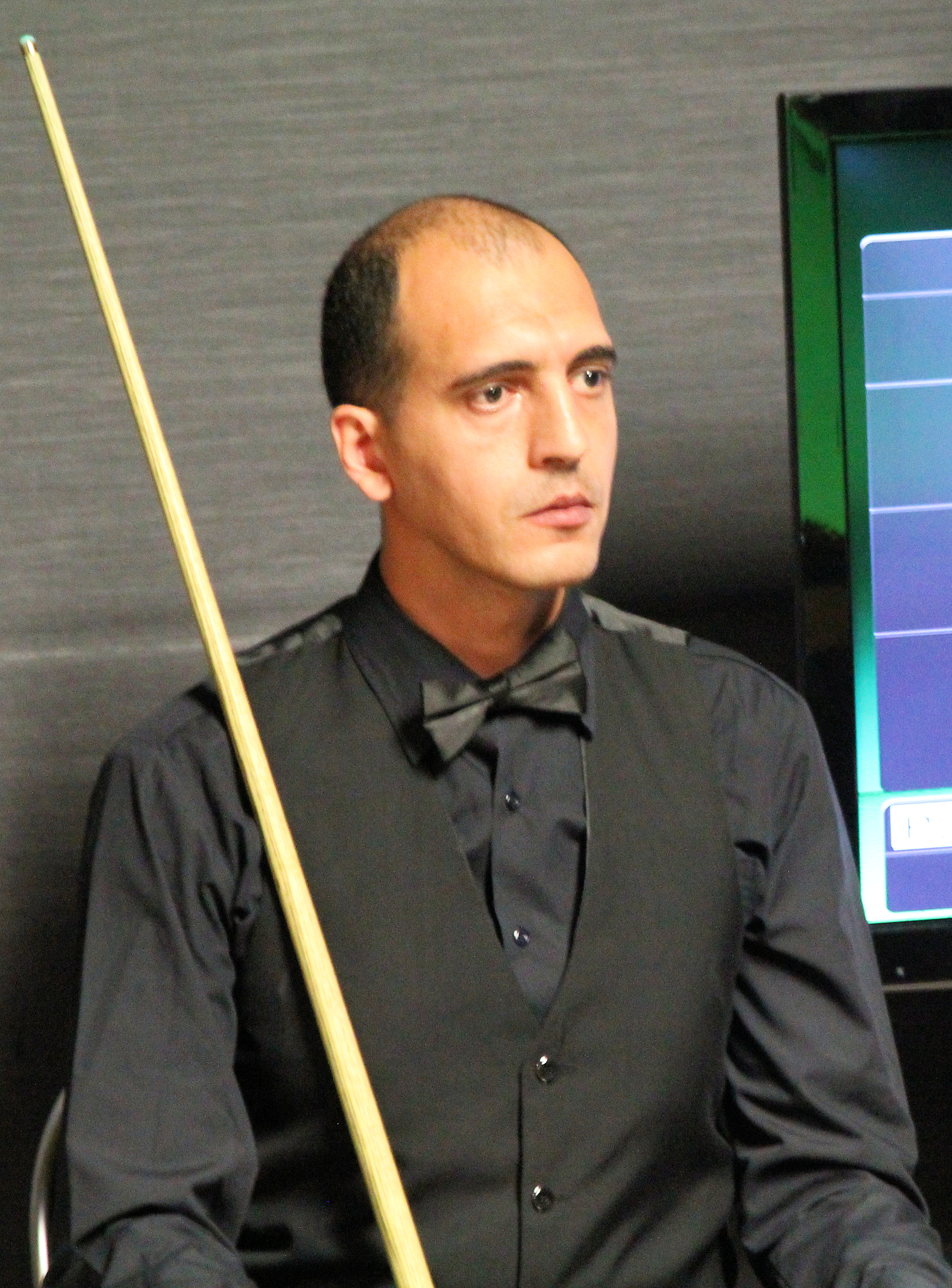
- Paul Hunter Classic 2018

Personal information
- Born: 17 August 1982 (age 44) Alexandria, Egypt

Sport
- Country: Egypt
- Sport: Snooker
- Professional: 2017–2019
- Highest ranking: 97 (June 2018)
- Best ranking finish: Last 64 (2018 Snooker Shoot-Out

Basem Abdullah Eltahhan (born 17 August 1982 in Alexandria, Egypt) is an Egyptian former professional snooker player. Eltahhan turned professional in 2017 winning the African Championship.

== Career ==
In 2017, Eltahhan beat fellow countryman Wael Talaat 6–5 in the final of the African Championship. The win gained him a two-year card on the World Snooker Tour for the 2017–18 and 2018–19 seasons.

Due to lack of sponsorship Eltahhan couldn't make his professional debut until the 2017 English Open. His only match win during the season came at the single-frame Shoot-Out event, although he impressed at the 2017 UK Championship, battling world number 1 Mark Selby before ultimately losing 4–6; Selby praised his opponent afterwards, saying that Eltahhan played like a top-32 player. Eltahhan failed to win a single match during the next season, which ended with a 10-0 whitewash at the hands of Liang Wenbo at the 2019 World Championship qualifying rounds, and thus was relegated from the tour.

== Performance and rankings timeline ==
| Tournament | 2016/ 17 | 2017/ 18 | 2018/ 19 |
|---|---|---|---|
| Ranking (Note: It shows the ranking at the beginning of the season.) | (Note: He was an amateur.) | (Note: New players on the Main Tour don't have a ranking.) | 97 |
Ranking tournaments
| Riga Masters (Note: The event was called the Riga Open (2015/2016)) | A | A | LQ |
| World Open | A | A | LQ |
| Paul Hunter Classic | A | A | 1R |
| China Championship | NR | A | LQ |
| European Masters | A | A | LQ |
| English Open | A | 1R | A |
| International Championship | A | A | A |
| Northern Ireland Open | A | 1R | 1R |
| UK Championship | A | 1R | 1R |
| Scottish Open | A | 1R | 1R |
| German Masters | A | LQ | LQ |
| World Grand Prix | DNQ | DNQ | DNQ |
| Welsh Open | A | 1R | A |
| Shoot-Out | A | 2R | A |
| Indian Open | A | A | LQ |
| Players Championship | DNQ | DNQ | DNQ |
| Gibraltar Open | A | A | A |
| Tour Championship | Not Held | | DNQ |
| China Open | A | LQ | A |
| World Championship | A | LQ | LQ |
Non-ranking tournaments
| Six-red World Championship | RR | A | A |
Former ranking tournaments
| Shanghai Masters | A | A | NR |

Performance Table Legend
| LQ | lost in the qualifying draw | #R | lost in the early rounds of the tournament (WR = Wildcard round, RR = Round robin) | QF | lost in the quarter-finals |
| SF | lost in the semi-finals | F | lost in the final | W | won the tournament |
| DNQ | did not qualify for the tournament | A | did not participate in the tournament | WD | withdrew from the tournament |

| NH / Not Held | means an event was not held. |
| NR / Non-Ranking Event | means an event is/was no longer a ranking event. |
| R / Ranking Event | means an event is/was a ranking event. |
| MR / Minor-Ranking Event | means an event is/was a minor-ranking event. |

== Career finals ==
=== Amateur finals: 1 (1 title) ===
| Outcome | No. | Year | Championship | Opponent in the final | Score |
|---|---|---|---|---|---|
| Winner | 1. | 2017 | ABSF African Snooker Championships | (Egypt) Wael Talaat | 6–5 |
