= Hatem Yassen =

Egyptian snooker player (born 1986)

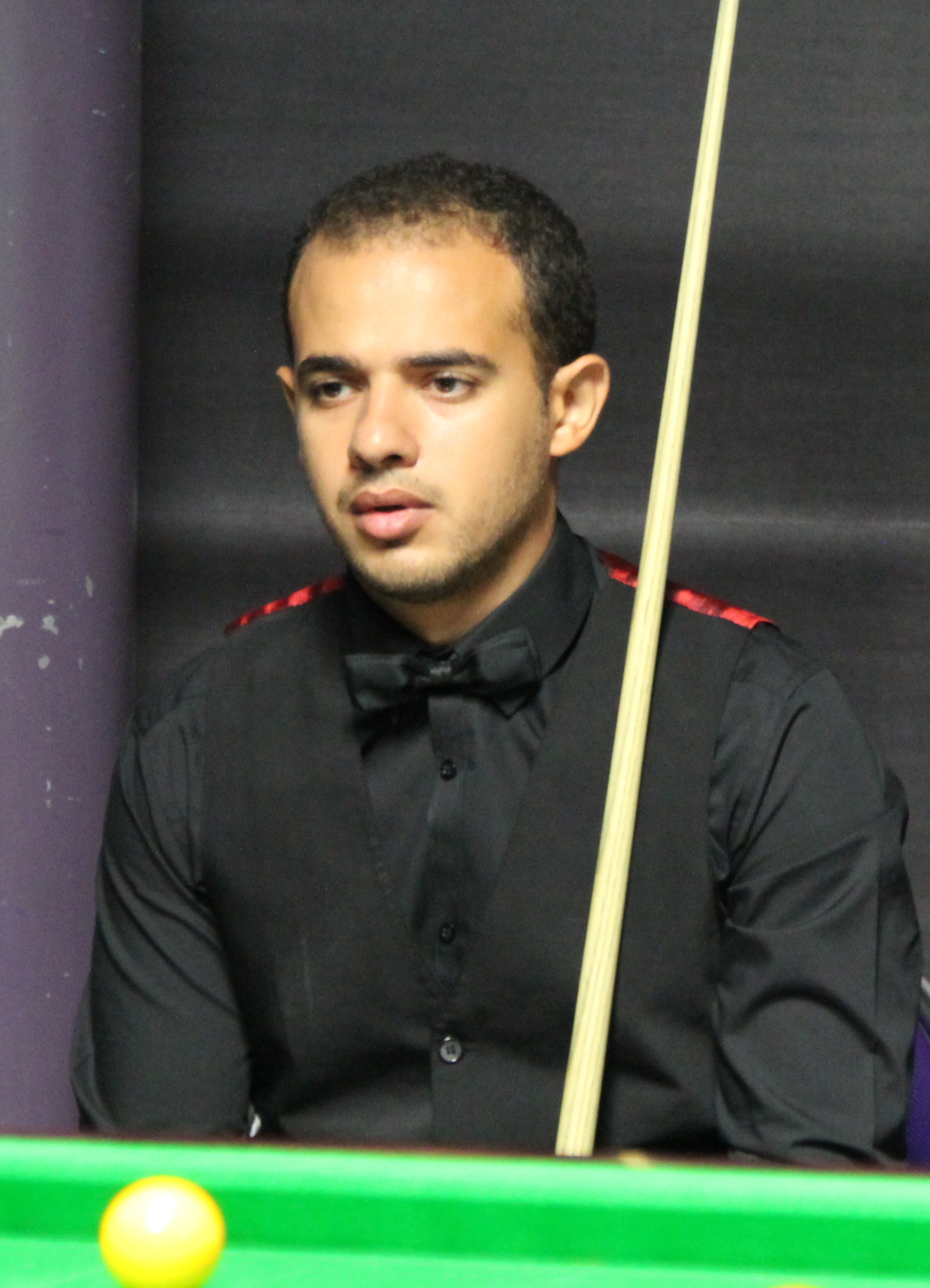
- Paul Hunter Classic 2016

Personal information
- Born: 21 August 1986 (age 40) Cairo, Egypt

Sport
- Country: Egypt
- Sport: Snooker
- Professional: 2015–2017, 2024–present
- Highest ranking: 93 (June 2016)
- Best ranking finish: Last 112 (x3)

Hatem Yassen (Arabic: حاتم ياسين Ḥātam Yāsīn; born 21 August 1986) is an Egyptian professional snooker player. Yassen turned professional in 2015 winning the African Championship.

== Career ==
In 2015, Yassen beat fellow countryman and former professional Mohamed Khairy 6–5 in the final of the African Championship. The win gained him a two-year card on the World Snooker Tour for the 2015–16 and 2016–17 seasons. He lost all six matches he played during the season and failed to pick up a frame in four of them. It was a similar story the following season as he lost all eight matches he played and he has now dropped off the tour.

In the qualifying stages of the 2024 UK Championship, Hatem won his first match as a professional, beating Mink Nutcharut 6-0.

== Performance and rankings timeline ==
Tournament	2015/ 16	2016/ 17	2024/ 25	2025/ 26
Ranking (Note: It shows the ranking at the beginning of the season)	(Note: New players on the Main Tour don't have a ranking)	93		94
Ranking tournaments
Championship League	Non-Ranking		A	RR
Saudi Arabia Masters	Not Held		A	2R
Wuhan Open	Not Held		A	LQ
English Open	NH	A	A	LQ
British Open	Not Held		A	LQ
Xi'an Grand Prix	Not Held		A	LQ
Northern Ireland Open	NH	A	A	LQ
International Championship	LQ	A	A	LQ
UK Championship	1R	A	LQ	LQ
Shoot Out	NR	1R	1R	1R
Scottish Open	NH	A	LQ	LQ
German Masters	LQ	A	LQ	LQ
World Grand Prix	DNQ	DNQ	DNQ	DNQ
Players Championship (Note: The event was called the Players Tour Championship Grand Final (2015/2016))	DNQ	DNQ	DNQ	DNQ
Welsh Open	1R	1R	LQ	LQ
World Open	NH	LQ	LQ	LQ
Tour Championship	Not Held		DNQ	DNQ
World Championship	LQ	LQ	LQ	
Former ranking tournaments
Riga Masters	MR	LQ	Not Held	
Indian Open	NH	LQ	Not Held	
Paul Hunter Classic	MR	1R	Not Held	
Shanghai Masters	A	LQ	Non-Ranking	
Gibraltar Open	MR	A	Not Held	
China Open	LQ	A	Not Held	

Performance Table Legend
LQ	lost in the qualifying draw	#R	lost in the early rounds of the tournament (WR = Wildcard round, RR = Round robin)	QF	lost in the quarter-finals
SF	lost in the semi-finals	F	lost in the final	W	won the tournament
DNQ	did not qualify for the tournament	A	did not participate in the tournament	WD	withdrew from the tournament

NH / Not Held	means an event was not held.
NR / Non-Ranking Event	means an event is/was no longer a ranking event.
R / Ranking Event	means an event is/was a ranking event.
MR / Minor-Ranking Event	means an event is/was a minor-ranking event.

== Career finals ==
=== Amateur finals: 2 (2 title) ===
Outcome	No.	Year	Championship	Opponent in the final	Score
Winner	1.	2015	ABSF African Snooker Championships	(Egypt) Mohamed Khairy	6–5
Winner	2.	2024	ABSF African Snooker Championships (2)	(Egypt) Abdelrahman Shahin	6–5
