= 2012 Six-red World Championship =

Six-red World Championship

Tournament information
- Dates: 2–7 July 2012
- Venue: Montien Riverside Hotel
- City: Bangkok
- Country: Thailand
- Organisation: World Professional Billiards and Snooker Association
- Total prize fund: 6,000,000 baht
- Winner's share: 2,000,000 baht
- Highest break: 75 (2x)

Final
- Champion: (England) Mark Davis
- Runner-up: (England) Shaun Murphy
- Score: 8–4

The 2012 Six-red World Championship (often styled the 2012 SangSom 6-red World Championship for sponsorship and marketing purposes) was a six-red snooker tournament held between 2 and 7 July 2012 at the Montien Riverside Hotel in Bangkok, Thailand. The highest break of the tournament was 75, compiled by both Judd Trump and Shaun Murphy.

Mark Selby was the defending champion, but he lost in the quarter-finals 5–7 against Trump.

Mark Davis won his second Six-reds World Championship title after 2009, by defeating Murphy 8–4 in the final.

== Prize money ==
The breakdown of prize money for this year is shown below:

- Winner: 2,000,000 baht
- Runner-up: 800,000 baht
- Semi-finalists: 400,000 baht
- Quarter-finalists: 200,000 baht
- Last 16: 100,000 baht
- Last 32: 50,000 baht
- Total: 6,000,000 baht

== Round-robin stage ==
The top four players from each group qualified for the knock-out stage. All matches were best of 9 frames.

=== Group A ===
POS	Player	MP	MW	FW	FL	FD	PTS
1	(England) Mark Selby	5	5	25	7	+18	5
2	(England) Joe Perry	5	3	19	16	+3	3
3	(Thailand) Dechawat Poomjaeng	5	3	17	14	+3	3
4	(Wales) Dominic Dale	5	3	21	19	+2	3
5	(Israel) Shachar Ruberg	5	1	15	24	−9	1
6	(Hong Kong) Andy Lee	5	0	8	25	−17	0

- Joe Perry 5–0 Andy Lee
- Mark Selby 5–1 Shachar Ruberg
- Andy Lee 0–5 Dechawat Poomjaeng
- Dominic Dale 5–4 Shachar Ruberg
- Dominic Dale 5–3 Andy Lee
- Mark Selby 5–2 Joe Perry
- Shachar Ruberg 1–5 Dechawat Poomjaeng
- Mark Selby 5–1 Andy Lee
- Dominic Dale 3–5 Dechawat Poomjaeng
- Joe Perry 5–4 Shachar Ruberg
- Joe Perry 5–2 Dechawat Poomjaeng
- Mark Selby 5–3 Dominic Dale
- Mark Selby 5–0 Dechawat Poomjaeng
- Andy Lee 4–5 Shachar Ruberg
- Dominic Dale 5–2 Joe Perry

=== Group B ===
POS	Player	MP	MW	FW	FL	FD	PTS
1	(Republic of Ireland) Rodney Goggins	5	5	25	11	+14	5
2	(England) Barry Hawkins	5	3	22	17	+5	3
3	(England) Judd Trump	5	3	18	14	+4	3
4	(Thailand) Issara Kachaiwong	5	3	20	18	+2	3
5	(England) Nick Jennings	5	1	13	23	−10	1
6	(Egypt) Mohamed Khairy	5	0	10	25	−15	0

- Judd Trump 2–5 Barry Hawkins
- Mohamed Khairy 1–5 Rodney Goggins
- Nick Jennings 2–5 Issara Kachaiwong
- Barry Hawkins 3–5 Rodney Goggins
- Nick Jennings 5–3 Mohamed Khairy
- Judd Trump 5–1 Issara Kachaiwong
- Rodney Goggins 5–4 Issara Kachaiwong
- Judd Trump 5–0 Nick Jennings
- Barry Hawkins 5–1 Mohamed Khairy
- Barry Hawkins 4–5 Issara Kachaiwong
- Judd Trump 1–5 Rodney Goggins
- Mohamed Khairy 2–5 Issara Kachaiwong
- Judd Trump 5–3 Mohamed Khairy
- Barry Hawkins 5–4 Nick Jennings
- Nick Jennings 2–5 Rodney Goggins

=== Group C ===
POS	Player	MP	MW	FW	FL	FD	PTS
1	(Wales) Mark Williams	5	4	24	12	+12	4
2	(India) Aditya Mehta	5	3	23	20	+3	3
3	(Thailand) Thanawat Thirapongpaiboon	5	3	20	19	+1	3
4	(Republic of Ireland) Ken Doherty	5	3	19	18	+1	3
5	(England) Peter Ebdon	5	2	17	21	−4	2
6	(China) Li Hang	5	0	12	25	−13	0

- Peter Ebdon 3–5 Ken Doherty
- Li Hang 4–5 Aditya Mehta
- Li Hang 1–5 Ken Doherty
- Aditya Mehta 5–4 Thanawat Thirapongpaiboon
- Mark Williams 5–1 Peter Ebdon
- Mark Williams 5–4 Aditya Mehta
- Ken Doherty 2–5 Thanawat Thirapongpaiboon
- Peter Ebdon 5–2 Li Hang
- Mark Williams 5–1 Li Hang
- Peter Ebdon 3–5 Thanawat Thirapongpaiboon
- Aditya Mehta 5–2 Ken Doherty
- Li Hang 4–5 Thanawat Thirapongpaiboon
- Mark Williams 4–5 Ken Doherty
- Peter Ebdon 5–4 Aditya Mehta
- Mark Williams 5–1 Thanawat Thirapongpaiboon

=== Group D ===
POS	Player	MP	MW	FW	FL	FD	PTS
1	(Iran) Hossein Vafaei	5	4	21	12	+9	4
2	(England) Mark Davis	5	4	23	18	+5	4
3	(Wales) Darren Morgan	5	3	21	15	+6	3
4	(Thailand) James Wattana	5	3	22	18	+4	3
5	(Scotland) Stephen Maguire	5	1	13	21	−8	1
6	(Egypt) Mohamed Ibrahim	5	0	9	25	−16	0

- Stephen Maguire 0–5 Hossein Vafaei
- Mohammed Ibrahim 2–5 James Wattana
- Mark Davis 5–3 Darren Morgan
- Hossein Vafaei 5–1 Mohammed Ibrahim
- Mark Davis 5–4 James Wattana
- Stephen Maguire 3–5 Darren Morgan
- Mark Davis 3–5 Hossein Vafaei
- Mohammed Ibrahim 1–5 Darren Morgan
- Darren Morgan 3–5 James Wattana
- Stephen Maguire 5–1 Mohammed Ibrahim
- Stephen Maguire 2–5 Mark Davis
- Hossein Vafaei 1–5 Darren Morgan
- Stephen Maguire 3–5 James Wattana
- Mark Davis 5–4 Mohammed Ibrahim
- Hossein Vafaei 5–3 James Wattana

=== Group E ===
POS	Player	MP	MW	FW	FL	FD	PTS
1	(England) Shaun Murphy	5	4	24	9	+15	4
2	(Thailand) Thepchaiya Un-Nooh	5	3	19	14	+5	3
3	(England) Steve Davis	5	3	17	17	0	3
4	(England) Andrew Higginson	5	3	16	17	−1	3
5	(India) Pankaj Advani	5	2	19	23	−4	2
6	(Australia) Ben Nunan	5	0	10	25	−15	0

- Shaun Murphy 4–5 Andrew Higginson
- Ben Nunan 4–5 Pankaj Advani
- Steve Davis 1–5 Thepchaiya Un-Nooh
- Shaun Murphy 5–0 Ben Nunan
- Pankaj Advani 5–4 Thepchaiya Un-Nooh
- Andrew Higginson 0–5 Steve Davis
- Andrew Higginson 5–2 Pankaj Advani
- Ben Nunan 2–5 Thepchaiya Un-Nooh
- Shaun Murphy 5–1 Steve Davis
- Ben Nunan 3–5 Steve Davis
- Shaun Murphy 5–3 Pankaj Advani
- Andrew Higginson 1–5 Thepchaiya Un-Nooh
- Pankaj Advani 4–5 Steve Davis
- Shaun Murphy 5–0 Thepchaiya Un-Nooh
- Andrew Higginson 5–1 Ben Nunan

=== Group F ===
POS	Player	MP	MW	FW	FL	FD	PTS
1	(England) Stephen Lee	5	4	22	11	+11	4
2	(England) Stuart Bingham	5	3	23	16	+7	3
3	(Afghanistan) Saleh Mohammed	5	3	22	21	+1	3
4	(England) Jimmy White	5	3	21	20	+1	3
5	(Thailand) Passakorn Suwannawat	5	2	15	22	−7	2
6	(Australia) Ben Judge	5	0	12	25	−13	0

- Saleh Mohammad 4–5 Passakorn Suwannawat
- Stephen Lee 5–3 Jimmy White
- Ben Judge 3–5 Passakorn Suwannawat
- Saleh Mohammad 5–3 Jimmy White
- Stuart Bingham 5–1 Ben Judge
- Stuart Bingham 4–5 Jimmy White
- Stephen Lee 5–3 Saleh Mohammad
- Jimmy White 5–2 Passakorn Suwannawat
- Stephen Lee 2–5 Stuart Bingham
- Ben Judge 4–5 Saleh Mohammad
- Stephen Lee 5–0 Ben Judge
- Stuart Bingham 5–3 Passakorn Suwannawat
- Ben Judge 4–5 Jimmy White
- Stephen Lee 5–0 Passakorn Suwannawat
- Stuart Bingham 4–5 Saleh Mohammad

=== Group G ===
POS	Player	MP	MW	FW	FL	FD	PTS
1	(England) Ricky Walden	5	4	23	11	+12	4
2	(Thailand) Noppon Saengkham	5	4	21	18	+3	4
3	(England) Tom Ford	5	3	21	16	+5	3
4	(Wales) Matthew Stevens	5	3	20	19	+1	3
5	(Scotland) Marcus Campbell	5	1	16	20	−4	1
6	(Poland) Krzysztof Wróbel	5	0	8	25	−17	0

- Marcus Campbell 5–0 Krzysztof Wróbel
- Tom Ford 5–1 Noppon Saengkham
- Matthew Stevens 5–3 Marcus Campbell
- Ricky Walden 3–5 Noppon Saengkham
- Tom Ford 5–3 Krzysztof Wróbel
- Matthew Stevens 3–5 Noppon Saengkham
- Ricky Walden 5–0 Krzysztof Wróbel
- Matthew Stevens 5–2 Krzysztof Wróbel
- Ricky Walden 5–2 Tom Ford
- Marcus Campbell 4–5 Noppon Saengkham
- Matthew Stevens 2–5 Ricky Walden
- Tom Ford 5–2 Marcus Campbell
- Ricky Walden 5–2 Marcus Campbell
- Matthew Stevens 5–4 Tom Ford
- Krzysztof Wróbel 3–5 Noppon Saengkham

=== Group H ===
POS	Player	MP	MW	FW	FL	FD	PTS
1	(Wales) Lee Walker	5	5	25	16	+9	5
2	(Hong Kong) Marco Fu	5	4	24	17	+7	4
3	(Scotland) Graeme Dott	5	2	21	18	+3	2
4	(Thailand) Panompai Powises	5	2	16	20	−4	2
5	(England) Martin Gould	5	2	16	21	−5	2
6	(China) Zhang Anda	5	0	15	25	−10	0

- Martin Gould 5–2 Panompai Powises
- Lee Walker 5–4 Zhang Anda
- Martin Gould 5–4 Zhang Anda
- Lee Walker 5–4 Marco Fu
- Graeme Dott 4–5 Panompai Powises
- Marco Fu 5–3 Panompai Powises
- Graeme Dott 5–3 Zhang Anda
- Martin Gould 4–5 Lee Walker
- Zhang Anda 3–5 Marco Fu
- Graeme Dott 3–5 Lee Walker
- Martin Gould 2–5 Marco Fu
- Lee Walker 5–1 Panompai Powises
- Graeme Dott 5–0 Martin Gould
- Graeme Dott 4–5 Marco Fu
- Zhang Anda 1–5 Panompai Powises

== Knockout stage ==
Last 32; Best of 11 frames
(England) Mark Selby	6
(Republic of Ireland) Ken Doherty	5
(Scotland) Graeme Dott	6
(Thailand) Noppon Saengkham	5
(England) Stuart Bingham	4
(England) Judd Trump	6
(England) Andrew Higginson	2
(Iran) Hossein Vafaei	6
(Wales) Mark Williams	4
(Wales) Dominic Dale	6
(England) Tom Ford	6
(Hong Kong) Marco Fu	4
(England) Barry Hawkins	6
(Afghanistan) Saleh Mohammed	5
(Thailand) James Wattana	5
(England) Shaun Murphy	6
(Wales) Lee Walker	4
(Thailand) Issara Kachaiwong	6
(Thailand) Thanawat Thirapongpaiboon	6
(Thailand) Thepchaiya Un-Nooh	5
(England) Joe Perry	6
(Wales) Darren Morgan	4
(England) Jimmy White	3
(England) Ricky Walden	6
(England) Stephen Lee	6
(Wales) Matthew Stevens	1
(England) Steve Davis	1
(England) Mark Davis	6
(India) Aditya Mehta	6
(Thailand) Dechawat Poomjaeng	4
(Thailand) Panompai Powises	6
(Republic of Ireland) Rodney Goggins	4

Last 16; Best of 11 frames
(England) Mark Selby	6
(Scotland) Graeme Dott	3
(England) Judd Trump	6
(Iran) Hossein Vafaei	1
(Wales) Dominic Dale	6
(England) Tom Ford	5
(England) Barry Hawkins	2
(England) Shaun Murphy	6
(Thailand) Issara Kachaiwong	6
(Thailand) Thanawat Thirapongpaiboon	5
(England) Joe Perry	3
(England) Ricky Walden	6
(England) Stephen Lee	5
(England) Mark Davis	6
(India) Aditya Mehta	5
(Thailand) Panompai Powises	6

Quarter-finals; Best of 13 frames
(England) Mark Selby	5
(England) Judd Trump	7
(Wales) Dominic Dale	6
(England) Shaun Murphy	7
(Thailand) Issara Kachaiwong	5
(England) Ricky Walden	7
(England) Mark Davis	7
(Thailand) Panompai Powises	5

Semi-finals; Best of 13 frames
(England) Judd Trump	2
(England) Shaun Murphy	7
(England) Ricky Walden	2
(England) Mark Davis	7

Final; Best of 15 frames
(England) Shaun Murphy	4
(England) Mark Davis	8
