= Cao Yupeng =

Chinese snooker player (born 1990)

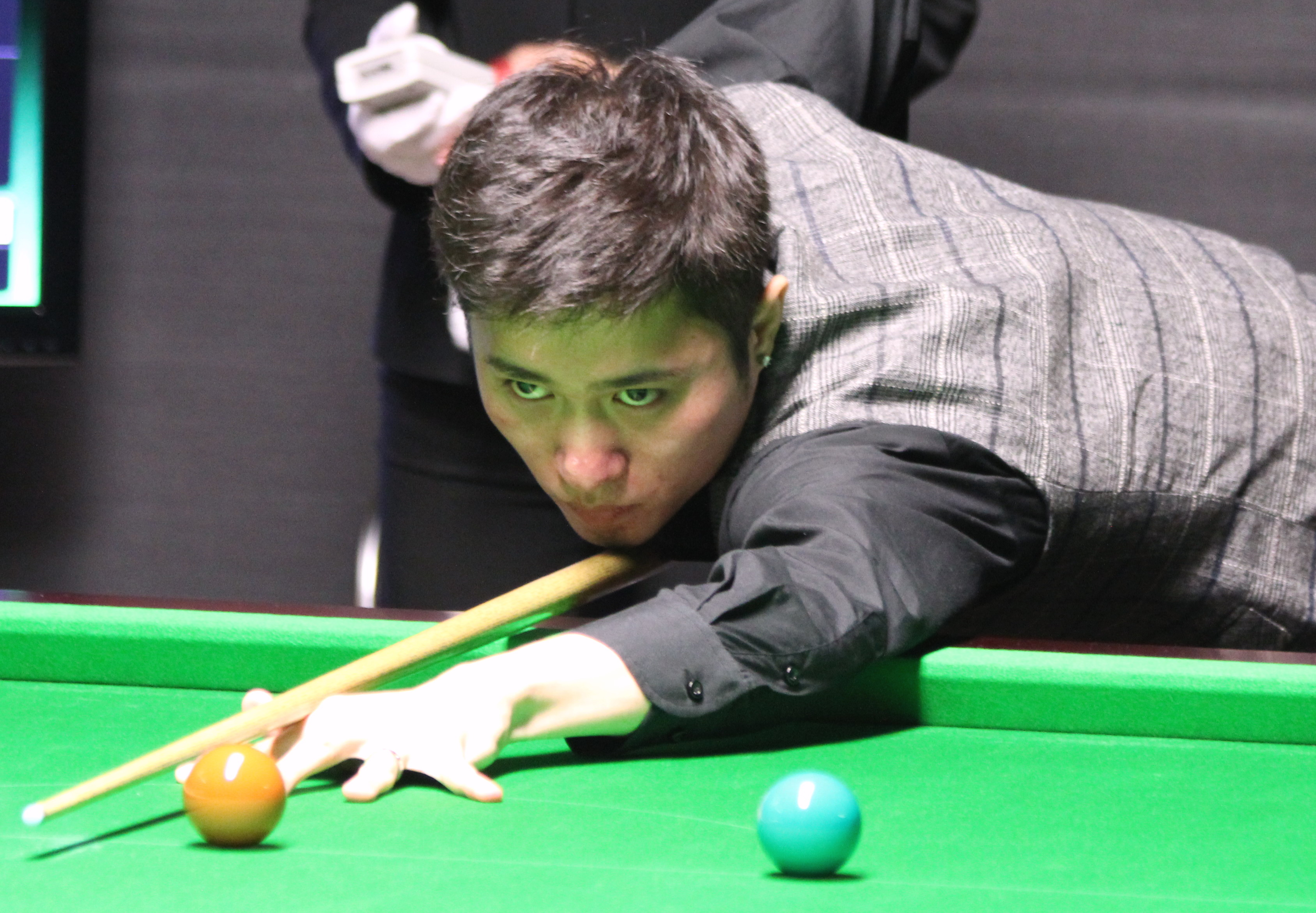
- Cao at the 2016 Paul Hunter Classic

Personal information
- Born: 27 October 1990 (age 36) Guangzhou, Guangdong, China

Sport
- Country: China
- Sport: Snooker
- Professional: 2011–2018, 2021–present
- Highest ranking: 35 (May 2024)
- Maximum breaks: 1
- Best ranking finish: Runner-up (x3)
Medal record
Men's snooker
Representing China
Asian Indoor and Martial Arts Games
| Gold medal – first place | 2013 Incheon | Individual |

Cao Yupeng
- Simplified Chinese: 曹宇鹏
- Traditional Chinese: 曹宇鵬
Transcriptions
Standard Mandarin
- Hanyu Pinyin: Cáo Yǔpéng
Yue: Cantonese
- Yale Romanization: Chòuh Yúh Pàahng
- Jyutping: Cou⁴ Jyu⁵ Paang⁴

Cao Yupeng (Chinese: 曹宇鹏; born 27 October 1990) is a Chinese former professional snooker player. He won the 2011 Asian Under-21 Championship, thus qualifying for the professional main tour for the 2011–12 season. In his first season on the circuit, he reached the last 16 of the World Championship.

He served a ban for match-fixing from 25 May 2018 until 24 November 2020. He received the ban on 1 December 2018, after pleading guilty to manipulating the outcome of matches.

== Career ==
=== Early career ===
Cao was selected as a wild card for the China Open twice, losing to Stuart Pettman in 2009 and Kurt Maflin in 2011. In April 2011, he beat Hossein Vafaei 7–3 in the final of the Asian Under-21 Championship, and in doing so earned a place on the main professional snooker tour for the 2011–12 season.

=== First season as a professional ===
Cao qualified for the 2012 World Snooker Championship in his debut season after defeating Kurt Maflin 10–2, Dave Harold 10–9 (coming back from 6–9 down), Nigel Bond 10–7 and Tom Ford 10–9 in the qualifying rounds. At the venue stage he put in an outstanding performance beating Mark Allen (world number 11) 10–6 to reach the last 16. After the match, Allen accused Cao of dishonesty following what he perceived as a foul shot which Cao did not own up to when he was leading 5–4. Allen also said that "blatant cheating" might be "a bit of a trait for the Chinese players". Television replays of the incident proved inconclusive; Cao stated that he did not remember the shot, for he was focusing on the game. Allen later apologised for his remarks, admitting that he had "overstepped the line". Cao played Ryan Day in his next match and trailed 7–9 going into the final session, when his opponent won four straight frames in just over an hour to result in a 7–13 defeat. Cao finished the season ranked world number 70, outside of the top 64 who retain their places on the snooker tour. However, he was awarded the second nomination from the Chinese national governing body for a spot in the 2012–13 season.

=== 2012/2013 season ===
Cao qualified for the second ranking event of the season, the Australian Goldfields Open, by beating Paul Davison, Alfie Burden and Mike Dunn all by 5–2 scorelines. He received a bye in the final qualifying round due to Anthony Hamilton's withdrawal, and then came through a wild-card match against Johl Younger once in Australia to reach the last 32. He faced Ali Carter and raced into a 4–0 lead before withstanding a fightback, eventually going on to win 5–3. Cao was beaten 5–4 by Martin Gould in the second round, without there ever being more than a frame between the players. He made a 143 break in the sixth frame, the highest of his career to date. A month later, Cao won three qualifying matches to reach the International Championship, played in Chengdu, in his homeland. He saw off Wang Yuchen in the wild-card round, before beating four-time world champion John Higgins in the first round, to set up a rematch with Mark Allen, following their clash at the end of last season. It was Allen who triumphed this time, with a 6–2 win.

He also came through three matches to qualify for the UK Championship for the first time. He was beaten 5–1 by Mark Davis in the first round in York. Cao could only win one more match during the rest of the season, culminating in the second round of World Championship Qualifying where he lost 10–7 to Zhang Anda, meaning he was unable to repeat last year's run to The Crucible. He was ranked world number 66 in the end of season rankings.

=== 2013/2014 season ===
Cao reached the first quarter-final of his career at the 2013 Wuxi Classic, the opening ranking event of the 2013–14 season. He qualified by defeating Paul Davison 5–1 and then saw off Michael White 5–3, world number eight Barry Hawkins 5–4 and Ben Woollaston 5–3. He faced world number one, Neil Robertson and, although he led 4–3 and made five breaks above 50 in five separate frames during the match, he was edged out 5–4. This was the closest match Robertson had and he ultimately went on to win the title. Cao won the first title of his career in winning the gold medal in the men's singles at the Asian Indoor and Martial Arts Games by beating Ding Junhui 4–2 in the final. Cao qualified for four more ranking events during the season but lost in the first round in each one, coming closest to progressing at the International Championship when he came back from 5–2 down against Ding to level before losing the final frame. All 128 players on the snooker tour earned automatic entry into the first round of the Welsh Open with Cao seeing off David Grace 4–2, but then lost another deciding frame in the next round this time against world number five, Hawkins. Cao's world ranking went up 20 places during the season as finished it as the number 46.

=== 2014/2015 season ===
He came close to reaching the quarter-finals of the Wuxi Classic for the second season in a row, after he defeated Mark King 5–1 and Ricky Walden 5–3, stating that he done some body building, jogging and gym work to try to improve his game. He lost 5–1 to Robin Hull in the last 16. He was knocked out in the first round of the UK Championship 6–4 by Lyu Haotian and beat Craig Steadman 4–2 at the Welsh Open. He won two frames to force a decider in the second round against Mark Allen, which Cao lost. Cao also qualified for the Indian Open and China Open, but was eliminated in the first round of both. He dropped 14 places in the world rankings to 60th, but inside the top 64 who remain on tour.

=== 2015/2016 season ===
Cao qualified for the International Championship with a 6–2 win over Liam Highfield, but was beaten 6–2 by Tian Pengfei in the first round. He could only win a total of four matches all season, finishing 72nd in the world rankings. This meant that Cao had to enter Q School and he earned his place back on the tour at the first event with five match wins.

=== 2016/2017 season ===
Cao was on a losing streak of 11 matches until he played in the Shoot-Out where he knocked out three players, before being defeated by David Grace. Aside from that, he only won two matches during the season.

=== 2017/2018 season ===
Cao notched his first-ever maximum break in tournament play in the second round of the Scottish Open. He became only the third player from mainland China to achieve the feat, following Ding Junhui and Liang Wenbo. Cao later reached the final of the Scottish Open, the first ranking final in his career. He built up a lead of 8–4 until his opponent, Neil Robertson, won the final five frames in dramatic fashion to defeat Cao by 9–8. In the same season Cao reached the semi-finals of the European Masters (losing to eventual champion Judd Trump) and his second final, the Gibraltar Open, where he lost 4–0 to Ryan Day.

He was suspended from the tour on 25 May 2018, alongside Yu Delu and David John, pending an investigation into suspected match fixing. After admitting to fixing three matches in 2016, Cao was suspended from professional play for thirty months by the WPBSA.

=== 2020/2021 season ===
Cao's ban expired in November 2020, but he was unable to play in the professional circuit as a top-up so entered into the CBSA China Tour. He regained his professional tour card having defeated Liu Hongyu 4–3 in the CBSA China Tours' second qualifying event, alongside former professional Zhang Anda.

=== 2021/2022 season ===
Despite having been suspended from the World Snooker Tour for three years, Cao had a relatively good start to his campaign in the 2021 Championship League and the 2021 British Open, with good performances in his matches throughout the season as a whole. Although he did not progress past the third round of any tournament, he had reached the cusp of the Top 64 by the 2022 World Snooker Championship, being seeded 70th in the qualifying round.

== Personal life ==
Cao is based in Gloucester, England, during the snooker season.

== Performance and rankings timeline ==
| Tournament | 2008/ 09 | 2010/ 11 | 2011/ 12 | 2012/ 13 | 2013/ 14 | 2014/ 15 | 2015/ 16 | 2016/ 17 | 2017/ 18 | 2018/ 19 | 2021/ 22 | 2022/ 23 | 2023/ 24 | 2024/ 25 | 2025/ 26 |
|---|---|---|---|---|---|---|---|---|---|---|---|---|---|---|---|
| Ranking (Note: It shows the ranking at the beginning of the season) | (Note: He was an amateur) | | (Note: New players on the Main Tour don't have a ranking) | (Note: Players qualified through Chinese nomination started the season without ranking points) | 66 | 46 | 60 | (Note: Players qualified through the Q School started the season without ranking points) | 89 | 38 (Note: He served a ban for match-fixing from 25 May 2018 until 24 November 2020) | | 65 | 40 | 35 | 62 |
Ranking tournaments
| Championship League | Non-Ranking Event | | | | | | | | | | 3R | RR | 3R | A | A |
| Saudi Arabia Masters | Tournament Not Held | | | | | | | | | | | | | A | A |
| Wuhan Open | Tournament Not Held | | | | | | | | | | | | 1R | A | A |
| English Open | Tournament Not Held | | | | | | | 1R | 2R | A | 1R | 1R | 2R | A | A |
| British Open | Tournament Not Held | | | | | | | | | | 2R | 2R | LQ | A | A |
| Xi'an Grand Prix | Tournament Not Held | | | | | | | | | | | | | A | A |
| Northern Ireland Open | Tournament Not Held | | | | | | | 1R | 1R | A | 1R | LQ | 1R | A | A |
| International Championship | Not Held | | | 2R | 1R | LQ | 1R | LQ | 1R | A | Not Held | | 1R | A | A |
| UK Championship | A | A | LQ | 1R | 1R | 1R | 1R | 1R | 2R | A | 3R | LQ | LQ | A | A |
| Shoot Out | NH | Non-Ranking Event | | | | | | 4R | QF | A | 2R | 3R | F | A | A |
| Scottish Open | Not Held | | | MR | Not Held | | | 1R | F | A | LQ | 1R | 1R | A | A |
| German Masters | NH | A | LQ | LQ | 1R | LQ | LQ | LQ | LQ | A | LQ | 1R | LQ | A | A |
| World Grand Prix | Tournament Not Held | | | | | NR | DNQ | DNQ | 1R | DNQ | 1R | DNQ | SF | DNQ | DNQ |
| Players Championship (Note: The event was called the Players Tour Championship Grand Final (2010/2011–2015/2016)) | NH | A | DNQ | 1R | DNQ | DNQ | DNQ | DNQ | DNQ | DNQ | DNQ | DNQ | DNQ | DNQ | DNQ |
| Welsh Open | A | A | LQ | LQ | 2R | 2R | 1R | 1R | 1R | A | 1R | 2R | LQ | A | A |
| World Open (Note: The event was called the Grand Prix (2008/2009)) | A | A | LQ | LQ | 1R | Not Held | | 1R | 3R | A | Not Held | | 2R | A | |
| Tour Championship | Tournament Not Held | | | | | | | | | DNQ | DNQ | DNQ | DNQ | DNQ | |
| World Championship | A | A | 2R | LQ | LQ | LQ | LQ | LQ | LQ | A | LQ | LQ | LQ | A | |
Former ranking tournaments
| Wuxi Classic (Note: The event ran under the name Jiangsu Classic (2008/2009–2009/2010)) | Non-Ranking Event | | | LQ | QF | 3R | Tournament Not Held | | | | | | | | |
| Australian Goldfields Open | Not Held | | LQ | 2R | LQ | LQ | A | Tournament Not Held | | | | | | | |
| Shanghai Masters | A | A | LQ | LQ | 1R | LQ | LQ | LQ | 2R | NR | Not Held | | Non-Ranking | | |
| Riga Masters (Note: The event was called the Riga Open (2014/2015–2015/2016)) | Tournament Not Held | | | | | Minor-Ranking | | A | 1R | A | Tournament Not Held | | | | |
| Paul Hunter Classic | PA | Minor-Ranking Event | | | | | | 2R | A | A | Tournament Not Held | | | | |
| China Championship | Tournament Not Held | | | | | | | NR | 1R | A | Tournament Not Held | | | | |
| Indian Open | Tournament Not Held | | | | LQ | 1R | NH | LQ | 1R | A | Tournament Not Held | | | | |
| China Open | WR | WR | LQ | LQ | LQ | 1R | LQ | LQ | 3R | A | Tournament Not Held | | | | |
| Turkish Masters | Tournament Not Held | | | | | | | | | | 1R | Tournament Not Held | | | |
| Gibraltar Open | Tournament Not Held | | | | | | MR | A | F | A | 2R | Tournament Not Held | | | |
| WST Classic | Tournament Not Held | | | | | | | | | | | 3R | Not Held | | |
| European Masters | Tournament Not Held | | | | | | | LQ | SF | A | 1R | LQ | LQ | Not Held | |
Former non-ranking tournaments
| Hainan Classic | NH | RR | Tournament Not Held | | | | | | | | | | | | |
| Wuxi Classic | A | A | 1R | Ranking Event | | | Tournament Not Held | | | | | | | | |
| Shoot Out | NH | A | A | 1R | 2R | A | 1R | Ranking Event | | | | | | | |
| Six-red World Championship (Note: The event was called the Six-red Snooker International (2008/2009)) | A | A | NH | A | RR | A | A | A | A | A | NH | LQ | Not Held | | |
| Haining Open | Tournament Not Held | | | | | Minor-Ranking | | 1R | 2R | A | A | A | Not Held | | |

Performance Table Legend
| LQ | lost in the qualifying draw | #R | lost in the early rounds of the tournament (WR = Wildcard round, RR = Round robin) | QF | lost in the quarter-finals |
| SF | lost in the semi-finals | F | lost in the final | W | won the tournament |
| DNQ | did not qualify for the tournament | A | did not participate in the tournament | WD | withdrew from the tournament |

| NH / Not Held | means an event was not held. |
| NR / Non-Ranking Event | means an event is/was no longer a ranking event. |
| R / Ranking Event | means an event is/was a ranking event. |
| MR / Minor-Ranking Event | means an event is/was a minor-ranking event. |
| PA / Pro-am Event | means an event is/was a pro-am event. |

== Career finals ==
=== Ranking finals: 3 ===
| Outcome | No. | Year | Championship | Opponent | Score |
|---|---|---|---|---|---|
| Runner-up | 1. | 2017 | Scottish Open | (Australia) Neil Robertson | 8–9 |
| Runner-up | 2. | 2018 | Gibraltar Open | (Wales) Ryan Day | 0–4 |
| Runner-up | 3. | 2023 | Snooker Shoot Out | (Northern Ireland) Mark Allen | 0–1 |

=== Non-ranking finals: 2 (1 title) ===
| Outcome | No. | Year | Championship | Opponent | Score |
|---|---|---|---|---|---|
| Winner | 1. | 2011 | HK Spring Trophy | (China) Liang Wenbo | 6–5 |
| Runner-up | 1. | 2015 | General Cup Qualifying Event | (China) Zhang Anda | 4–5 |

=== Pro-am finals: 2 (2 titles) ===
| Outcome | No. | Year | Championship | Opponent | Score |
|---|---|---|---|---|---|
| Winner | 1. | 2013 | Asian Indoor and Martial Arts Games | (China) Ding Junhui | 4–2 |
| Winner | 2. | 2017 | Baoying Open | (China) Chang Bingyu | 5–4 |

=== Amateur finals: 1 (1 title) ===
| Outcome | No. | Year | Championship | Opponent | Score |
|---|---|---|---|---|---|
| Winner | 1. | 2011 | ACBS Asian Under-21 Championship | (Iran) Hossein Vafaei | 7–3 |
