= 2013 Shanghai Masters =

Bank of Communications Shanghai Masters

Tournament information
- Dates: 16–22 September 2013
- Venue: Shanghai Grand Stage
- City: Shanghai
- Country: China
- Organisation: World Snooker
- Format: Ranking event
- Total prize fund: £425,000
- Winner's share: £80,000
- Highest break: Barry Hawkins (ENG) (140)

Final
- Champion: Ding Junhui (CHN)
- Runner-up: Xiao Guodong (CHN)
- Score: 10–6

The 2013 Bank of Communications Shanghai Masters was a professional ranking snooker tournament that took place between 16 and 22 September 2013 at the Shanghai Grand Stage in Shanghai, China. The seventh edition of the tournament since it was first held in 2007, it was the third ranking event of the 2013/2014 season.

John Higgins was the defending champion, but he lost 1–5 against Mark Davis in the last 16.

Ding Junhui won his seventh ranking title by defeating Xiao Guodong 10–6 in the final. This was the first time that two Chinese players had reached the final of a ranking event, but was also the first of three consecutive ranking finals between Asian players, all of which were won by Ding.

== Prize fund ==
The total prize money of the event was raised to £425,000 from the previous year's £400,000. The breakdown of prize money for this year is shown below:

- Winner: £80,000
- Runner-up: £35,000
- Semi-final: £19,500
- Quarter-final: £11,000
- Last 16: £7,500
- Last 32: £6,000
- Last 48: £2,300
- Last 64: £1,500
- Last 96: £250
- Non-televised highest break: £200
- Televised highest break: £2,000
- Total: £425,000

== Wildcard round ==
These matches were played in Shanghai on 16 and 17 September 2013.

Match		Score	
WC1	Xiao Guodong (CHN)	5–0	Yuan Sijun (CHN)
WC2	Cao Yupeng (CHN)	5–4	Zhou Yuelong (CHN)
WC3	Martin Gould (ENG)	5–4	Zhao Xintong (CHN)
WC4	Andrew Higginson (ENG)	4–5	Lin Shuai (CHN)
WC5	Ryan Day (WAL)	5–1	Lu Ning (CHN)
WC6	David Gilbert (ENG)	5–4	Fang Xiongman (CHN)
WC7	Mark King (ENG)	5–1	Zhu Yinghui (CHN)
WC8	Joe Perry (ENG)	3–5	Wang Yuchen (CHN)

== Main draw ==
Last 32; Best of 9 frames
1	(Scotland) John Higgins	5
(England) Mike Dunn	1
15	(England) Mark Davis	5
(England) Ali Carter	2
12	(Wales) Matthew Stevens	4
(England) Peter Lines	5
6	(Scotland) Stephen Maguire	2
(China) Xiao Guodong	5
8	(England) Stuart Bingham	1
(England) Kyren Wilson	5
13	(Hong Kong) Marco Fu	5
(China) Cao Yupeng	0
9	(England) Ricky Walden	3
(England) Martin Gould	5
4	(England) Judd Trump	1
(England) Michael Holt	5
3	(England) Mark Selby	5
(China) Lin Shuai	2
14	(England) Robert Milkins	5
(England) Mark Joyce	4
10	(Northern Ireland) Mark Allen	1
(Wales) Ryan Day	5
7	(England) Barry Hawkins	5
(England) David Grace	0
5	(England) Shaun Murphy	5
(China) Yu Delu	4
11	(China) Ding Junhui	5
(England) David Gilbert	2
16	(Scotland) Graeme Dott	3
(England) Mark King	5
2	(Australia) Neil Robertson	5
(China) Wang Yuchen	1

Last 16; Best of 9 frames
1	(Scotland) John Higgins	1
15	(England) Mark Davis	5
(England) Peter Lines	3
(China) Xiao Guodong	5
(England) Kyren Wilson	5
13	(Hong Kong) Marco Fu	3
(England) Martin Gould	4
(England) Michael Holt	5
3	(England) Mark Selby	5
14	(England) Robert Milkins	4
(Wales) Ryan Day	2
7	(England) Barry Hawkins	5
5	(England) Shaun Murphy	4
11	(China) Ding Junhui	5
(England) Mark King	3
2	(Australia) Neil Robertson	5

Quarter-finals; Best of 9 frames
15	(England) Mark Davis	4
(China) Xiao Guodong	5
(England) Kyren Wilson	1
(England) Michael Holt	5
3	(England) Mark Selby	4
7	(England) Barry Hawkins	5
11	(China) Ding Junhui	5
2	(Australia) Neil Robertson	2

Semi-finals; Best of 11 frames
(China) Xiao Guodong	6
(England) Michael Holt	3
7	(England) Barry Hawkins	2
11	(China) Ding Junhui	6

Final; Best of 19 frames
(China) Xiao Guodong	6
11	(China) Ding Junhui	10

== Final ==
Final: Best of 19 frames. Referee: Eirian Williams. Shanghai Grand Stage, Shanghai, China, 22 September 2013.
Xiao Guodong; China	6–10	Ding Junhui (11); China
Afternoon: 37–85, 13–103 (83), 74–0 (62), 88–31 (67), 29–67 (66), 77–47 (52), 0–127 (126), 26–101 (58), 38–57; Evening: 78–0 (78), 12–65 (58), 8–78 (78), 0–81 (81), 86–9, 85–0, 45–78 (71)
78	Highest break	126
0	Century breaks	1
4	50+ breaks	8

== Qualifying ==
These matches were held between 7 and 10 August 2013 at the Doncaster Dome in Doncaster, England.

Round 1 Best of 9 frames
(England) Martin O'Donnell	5
(Australia) Vinnie Calabrese	4
(Thailand) Thepchaiya Un-Nooh	5
(Northern Ireland) Joe Swail	2
(Thailand) Thanawat Thirapongpaiboon	0
(Scotland) Ross Muir	5
(Wales) Andrew Pagett	5
(England) Lee Page	3
(England) Liam Highfield	w/o
(China) Jin Long	w/d
(Thailand) Passakorn Suwannawat	4
(Egypt) Mohamed Khairy	5
(Scotland) Michael Leslie	3
(Wales) Duane Jones	5
(China) Li Yan	5
(England) Ryan Clark	1
(England) Alex Davies	2
(England) Kyren Wilson	5
(China) Zhang Anda	4
(England) Chris Norbury	5
(China) Chen Zhe	5
(England) Sanderson Lam	3
(England) Sean O'Sullivan	5
(England) James Cahill	4
(Republic of Ireland) David Morris	5
(England) Elliot Slessor	1
(Scotland) Scott Donaldson	5
(England) Andrew Norman	3
(England) Simon Bedford	w/o
(China) Cao Xinlong	w/d
(Belgium) Luca Brecel	5
(England) Mitchell Travis	2
(England) Gary Wilson	5
(Thailand) Noppon Saengkham	4
(India) Aditya Mehta	5
(England) Hammad Miah	0
(England) Ian Burns	5
(Qatar) Ahmed Saif	0
(England) Paul Davison	3
(England) Allan Taylor	5
(England) Craig Steadman	5
(China) Lyu Haotian	2
(England) Jamie O'Neill	5
(England) Antony Parsons	1
(England) John Astley	5
(Scotland) Rhys Clark	1
(England) David Grace	5
(Germany) Patrick Einsle	4
(England) Sam Baird	5
(Malta) Alex Borg	4
(Malta) Tony Drago	5
(England) Dylan Mitchell	3
(China) Li Hang	5
(Wales) Jak Jones	3
(Wales) Daniel Wells	5
(Scotland) Fraser Patrick	2
(England) Michael Wasley	5
(Thailand) Ratchayothin Yotharuck	1
(India) Pankaj Advani	5
(Finland) Robin Hull	4
(England) Joel Walker	5
(England) Sydney Wilson	3
(England) Robbie Williams	5
(England) Chris Wakelin	2

Round 2 Best of 9 frames
(England) Nigel Bond	1
(England) Martin O'Donnell	5
(England) Mike Dunn	5
(Thailand) Thepchaiya Un-Nooh	4
(England) Adam Duffy	5
(Scotland) Ross Muir	2
(Scotland) Jamie Burnett	5
(Wales) Andrew Pagett	3
(England) Peter Lines	5
(England) Liam Highfield	4
(England) Rod Lawler	1
(Egypt) Mohamed Khairy	5
(China) Tian Pengfei	5
(Wales) Duane Jones	1
(China) Xiao Guodong	5
(China) Li Yan	2
(England) Barry Pinches	1
(England) Kyren Wilson	5
(Thailand) James Wattana	5
(England) Chris Norbury	3
(England) Alfie Burden	5
(China) Chen Zhe	1
(China) Cao Yupeng	5
(England) Sean O'Sullivan	4
(Northern Ireland) Gerard Greene	1
(Republic of Ireland) David Morris	5
(China) Liang Wenbo	5
(Scotland) Scott Donaldson	2
(England) Matthew Selt	4
(England) Simon Bedford	5
(England) Rory McLeod	5
(Belgium) Luca Brecel	3
(England) Steve Davis	5
(England) Gary Wilson	4
(Wales) Jamie Jones	5
(India) Aditya Mehta	4
(England) Mark Joyce	5
(England) Ian Burns	3
(England) Anthony Hamilton	5
(England) Allan Taylor	3
(China) Liu Chuang	5
(England) Craig Steadman	4
(England) Jimmy White	5
(England) Jamie O'Neill	3
(England) Dave Harold	5
(England) John Astley	1
(Scotland) Anthony McGill	3
(England) David Grace	5
(Thailand) Dechawat Poomjaeng	1
(England) Sam Baird	5
(China) Yu Delu	5
(Malta) Tony Drago	1
(England) David Gilbert	5
(China) Li Hang	4
(England) Jack Lisowski	5
(Wales) Daniel Wells	2
(England) Jimmy Robertson	1
(England) Michael Wasley	5
(Scotland) Alan McManus	4
(India) Pankaj Advani	5
(Norway) Kurt Maflin	5
(England) Joel Walker	0
(England) Jamie Cope	3
(England) Robbie Williams	5

Round 3 Best of 9 frames
(England) Martin O'Donnell	3
(England) Mike Dunn	5
(England) Adam Duffy	5
(Scotland) Jamie Burnett	4
(England) Peter Lines	5
(Egypt) Mohamed Khairy	0
(China) Tian Pengfei	2
(China) Xiao Guodong	5
(England) Kyren Wilson	5
(Thailand) James Wattana	2
(England) Alfie Burden	4
(China) Cao Yupeng	5
(Republic of Ireland) David Morris	5
(China) Liang Wenbo	1
(England) Simon Bedford	4
(England) Rory McLeod	5
(England) Steve Davis	5
(Wales) Jamie Jones	1
(England) Mark Joyce	5
(England) Anthony Hamilton	2
(China) Liu Chuang	3
(England) Jimmy White	5
(England) Dave Harold	1
(England) David Grace	5
(England) Sam Baird	2
(China) Yu Delu	5
(England) David Gilbert	5
(England) Jack Lisowski	2
(England) Michael Wasley	5
(India) Pankaj Advani	4
(Norway) Kurt Maflin	4
(England) Robbie Williams	5

Round 4 Best of 9 frames
(Wales) Dominic Dale	3
(England) Mike Dunn	5
(England) Ali Carter	5
(England) Adam Duffy	4
(Wales) Michael White	2
(England) Peter Lines	5
(England) Peter Ebdon	0
(China) Xiao Guodong	5
(Scotland) Marcus Campbell	3
(England) Kyren Wilson	5
(England) Ben Woollaston	3
(China) Cao Yupeng	5
(England) Martin Gould	5
(Republic of Ireland) David Morris	0
(England) Michael Holt	5
(England) Rory McLeod	4
(England) Andrew Higginson	5
(England) Steve Davis	2
(Republic of Ireland) Fergal O'Brien	4
(England) Mark Joyce	5
(Wales) Ryan Day	5
(England) Jimmy White	1
(England) Tom Ford	2
(England) David Grace	5
(Republic of Ireland) Ken Doherty	1
(China) Yu Delu	5
(Wales) Mark Williams	4
(England) David Gilbert	5
(England) Mark King	5
(England) Michael Wasley	1
(England) Joe Perry	5
(England) Robbie Williams	3

== Century breaks ==
=== Qualifying stage centuries ===
- 137 – Jamie Burnett
- 128 – Daniel Wells
- 127 – Peter Lines
- 125 – Gary Wilson
- 120 – Li Hang
- 120 – Cao Yupeng
- 118 – Simon Bedford
- 115 – John Astley
- 113 – Jack Lisowski
- 108 – Mike Dunn
- 106 – Mark Joyce
- 105 – Pankaj Advani
- 105 – Robbie Williams
- 104 – David Gilbert
- 103 – Tom Ford
- 100 – Matthew Selt
- 100 – Jamie Jones
- 100 – Joe Perry

=== Televised stage centuries ===
- 140, 107 – Barry Hawkins
- 133 – Kyren Wilson
- 129, 126, 109, 106 – Ding Junhui
- 127, 122, 111 – Xiao Guodong
- 127, 109 – Martin Gould
- 122, 104 – Neil Robertson
- 122, 102 – Mark Davis
- 120, 107, 101 – Mark Selby
- 116, 102 – Shaun Murphy
- 115, 113 – Michael Holt
- 109 – Fang Xiongman
- 107, 100 – John Higgins
- 106 – Mark King
