= Mohamed Khairy =

Egyptian snooker player (born 1981)

Mohamed Alaa Khairy
Personal information
- Born: 26 December 1981 (age 44) Cairo, Egypt

Sport
- Country: Egypt
- Sport: Snooker
- Professional: 2012–2014
- Highest ranking: 95 (June 2013)
- Best ranking finish: Last 64 (2013 Shanghai Masters)

Mohamed Alaa Khairy (born 26 December 1981) is an Egyptian former professional snooker player. Khairy turned professional in 2012 after having been nominated by the African Billiards and Snooker Federation, but was relegated from the tour after two seasons.

== Career ==
=== Debut season ===
Khairy did not play in the first six ranking tournaments and all ten Players Tour Championship events due to visa problems. He lost all of his first four matches as a professional, with Khairy's season ending when he was beaten 3–10 by Tony Drago in the first round of World Championship Qualifying. He finished his first year on tour ranked world number 96.

=== 2013/2014 season ===
Khairy won his first match as a professional in the Shanghai Masters qualifiers where he beat Passakorn Suwannawat 5–4. Afterwards it was announced by World Snooker that the match was being investigated due to unusual betting patterns. Khairy then defeated Rod Lawler 5–1, before being whitewashed 5–0 by Peter Lines in the penultimate round. After failing to qualify for the International Championship he didn't enter another tournament, resulting in his relegation from the main tour as he ended the season ranked 121st in the world. No charges were ever brought regarding the betting activity.

=== Amateur career ===
In 2015, Khairy lost 6–5 to Hatem Yassen in the final of the African Championship. A win would have regained him a place on the snooker tour. He also lost the 2023 final 5-2 against Mostafa Dorgham.

== Performance and rankings timeline ==
| Tournament | 2010/ 11 | 2012/ 13 | 2013/ 14 | 2018/ 19 | 2019/ 20 |
|---|---|---|---|---|---|
| Ranking (Note: It shows the ranking at the beginning of the season) | (Note: He was an amateur) | (Note: New players on the Main Tour don't have a ranking) | 96 | | |
Ranking tournaments
| International Championship | NH | WD | LQ | A | A |
| World Open | A | LQ | A | A | A |
| German Masters | A | WD | A | A | A |
| World Grand Prix | Tournament Not Held | | | DNQ | DNQ |
| Welsh Open | A | LQ | A | A | A |
| Players Championship (Note: The event was called the Players Tour Championship Final (2010/2011, 2012/2013-2013/2014)) | DNQ | DNQ | DNQ | DNQ | DNQ |
| Tour Championship | Tournament Not Held | | | DNQ | DNQ |
| World Championship | A | LQ | A | A | A |
Non-ranking tournaments
| Six-red World Championship | RR | RR | A | RR | RR |
Former ranking tournaments
| Wuxi Classic | NR | A | LQ | Not Held | |
| Australian Goldfields Open | NH | A | LQ | Not Held | |
| Shanghai Masters | A | WD | LQ | Non-Ranking | |
| Indian Open | Not Held | | LQ | A | NH |
| China Open | A | LQ | A | A | NH |

Performance Table Legend
| LQ | lost in the qualifying draw | #R | lost in the early rounds of the tournament (WR = Wildcard round, RR = Round robin) | QF | lost in the quarter-finals |
| SF | lost in the semi-finals | F | lost in the final | W | won the tournament |
| DNQ | did not qualify for the tournament | A | did not participate in the tournament | WD | withdrew from the tournament |

| NH / Not Held | means an event was not held. |
| NR / Non-Ranking Event | means an event is/was no longer a ranking event. |
| R / Ranking Event | means an event is/was a ranking event. |
| MR / Minor-Ranking Event | means an event is/was a minor-ranking event. |
