= 2023 Snooker Shoot Out (2023–24 season) =

Snooker tournament held in December 2023

2023 BetVictor Snooker Shoot Out

Tournament information
- Dates: 6–9 December 2023
- Venue: Swansea Arena
- City: Swansea
- Country: Wales
- Organisation: World Snooker Tour
- Format: Ranking event
- Total prize fund: £171,000
- Winner's share: £50,000
- Highest break: Shaun Murphy (ENG) (147)

Final
- Champion: Mark Allen (NIR)
- Runner-up: Cao Yupeng (CHN)
- Score: 65–4 (one frame)

The 2023 Snooker Shoot Out (officially the 2023 BetVictor Snooker Shoot Out) was a professional snooker tournament that took place from 6 to 9 December 2023 at the Swansea Arena in Swansea, South Wales. Played under a variation of the standard rules of snooker, with every match contested over a single frame, the tournament was the ninth ranking event of the 2023–24 snooker season and the fifth of eight events in the 2024 European Series. Sponsored by BetVictor, the event was broadcast by Eurosport and Discovery+ in Europe.

Chris Wakelin was the defending champion, having defeated Julien Leclercq 119‍–‍0 in the previous final, but he lost 44‍–‍46 in the second round to Joe O'Connor. Shaun Liu, who had turned 13 in July 2023, defeated Ishpreet Singh Chadha 57‍–‍52 and became the youngest winner of a televised match in a ranking event. In the first round match against Bulcsú Révész, Shaun Murphy made his eighth career maximum break, the first ever compiled at the Shoot Out.

In the final of the event, world number four Mark Allen defeated Cao Yupeng 65‍–‍4 to capture his tenth ranking title. He became the first player in the history of the event to win the title while ranked within the world's top 16. "It's just so hard," Allen said after the match, "the easiest of shots turns into the most difficult and you feel more pressure here in a 10‍–‍minute frame than you would do in the final frame of a big ranking tournament final at 9‍–‍9 or something. It just does crazy things to your brain."

== Tournament format ==
The tournament was played using a variation of the traditional snooker rules. The draw was randomised before each round. All matches were played over a single frame, each of which lasts up to 10 minutes. The event featured a variable shot clock; shots played in the first five minutes are allowed 15 seconds while the final five has a 10-second timer. All foul shots award the opponent a ball in hand. Unlike traditional snooker, if a ball does not hit a cushion on every shot, it is a foul. Rather than a coin toss, a lag is used to choose which player breaks. In the event of a draw, each player receives a shot at the blue ball. This is known as a "blue ball shootout". The player who pots the ball with the cue ball from inside the "D" and the blue ball on its spot with the opponent missing wins the match.

=== Broadcasters ===
The event was broadcast by Eurosport and Discovery+ in Europe (including the UK and Ireland); Migu, Youku, and Huya in Mainland China; Now TV in Hong Kong; Astro SuperSport in Malaysia and Brunei; TrueVisions in Thailand; Sportcast in Taiwan; Premier Sports Network in the Philippines; Fastsports in Pakistan; and Matchroom.live in all other territories.

=== Prize fund ===
The total prize fund for the event is £171,000 with the winner receiving £50,000. The breakdown of prize money is shown below:

- Winner: £50,000
- Runner-up: £20,000
- Semi-final: £8,000
- Quarter-final: £4,000
- Last 16: £2,000
- Last 32: £1,000
- Last 64: £500
- Last 128: £250 (Note: The prize money for losing in the first round did not count towards the world rankings.)
- Highest break: £5,000
- Total: £171,000

== Tournament draw ==
All times in Greenwich Mean Time. Times for quarter-finals, semi-finals and final are approximate. Players in bold denote match winners. The draw is listed in the order of play.

=== Round 1 ===
==== 6 December – 13:00 ====
- **Chris Wakelin** (ENG) **72**–62 Pang Junxu (CHN)
- Joel Connolly (NIR) 35–**43** **Jiang Jun** (CHN)
- Lyu Haotian (CHN) 52–**53** **Liam Davies** (WAL)
- Joe Perry (ENG) 5–**16** **Alfie Davies** (WAL)
- **Ali Carter** (ENG) **86**–1 Ross Muir (SCO)
- Andrew Pagett (WAL) 6–**77** **Barry Pinches** (ENG)
- Ishpreet Singh Chadha (IND) 52–**57** **Shaun Liu** (HKG) (Note: 13-year-old Shaun Liu became the youngest player to win a match in a televised ranking event.)
- Ryan Thomerson (AUS) 1–**13** **Elliot Slessor** (ENG)
- Ricky Walden (ENG) 35–**42** **Iulian Boiko** (UKR)
- **Alexander Ursenbacher** (SUI) **39**–27 Ashley Hugill (ENG)
- **Zhou Yuelong** (CHN) **37**–5 Stuart Carrington (ENG)
- **Graeme Dott** (SCO) **55**–46 Sean O'Sullivan (ENG)
- **Andy Hicks** (ENG) **64**–29 Martin O'Donnell (ENG)
- Rod Lawler (ENG) 31–**33** **Oliver Sykes** (ENG)
- **Lukas Kleckers** (GER) **84**–29 Stuart Bingham (ENG)
- Ken Doherty (IRL) 5–**109** **Matthew Stevens** (WAL)

==== 6 December – 19:00 ====
- **Mark Allen** (NIR) **52**–15 Ben Woollaston (ENG)
- **Michael White** (WAL) **92**–0 Mohamed Ibrahim (EGY)
- Allan Taylor (ENG) 33–**35** **Oliver Brown** (ENG)
- Xing Zihao (CHN) 31–**42** **Xu Si** (CHN)
- **Mark Davis** (ENG) **94**–8 Baipat Siripaporn (THA)
- M. Phetmalaikul (THA) 31–**32** **Mostafa Dorgham** (EGY)
- **Cao Yupeng** (CHN) **73**–32 Sydney Wilson (ENG)
- Rory Thor (MAS) 26–**39** **David Gilbert** (ENG)
- **Dominic Dale** (WAL) **64**–1 Fan Zhengyi (CHN)
- **Duane Jones** (WAL) **82**–0 Jenson Kendrick (ENG)
- Andy Lee (HKG) 11–**75** **Joe O'Connor** (ENG)
- **Kyren Wilson** (ENG) **47**–38 Daniel Wells (WAL)
- **Louis Heathcote** (ENG) **45**–43 Xiao Guodong (CHN)
- **Liam Pullen** (ENG) **58**–1 Yuan Sijun (CHN)
- **Ian Burns** (ENG) **61**–0 Florian Nüßle (AUT) (Note: Sam Craigie withdrew and was replaced by Florian Nüßle.)
- Jimmy White (ENG) 43–**62** **Zak Surety** (ENG)

==== 7 December – 13:00 ====
- Riley Powell (WAL) 9–**65** **Jamie O'Neill** (ENG) (Note: Hossein Vafaei withdrew and was replaced by Jamie O'Neill.)
- Adam Duffy (ENG) 15–**33** **Jack Borwick** (SCO)
- Leone Crowley (IRL) 9–**64** **Jackson Page** (WAL)
- **Tian Pengfei** (CHN) **56**–35 Alex Taubman (WAL) (Note: Martin Gould withdrew and was replaced by Alex Taubman.)
- **Stan Moody** (ENG) **43**–14 Rory McLeod (JAM)
- Liam Highfield (ENG) 37–**87** **Si Jiahui** (CHN)
- **Oliver Lines** (ENG) **69**–22 Ma Hailong (CHN)
- Muhammad Asif (PAK) 50–**57** **Zhang Anda** (CHN)
- **Ryan Day** (WAL) **25**–5 Anton Kazakov (UKR)
- **Jimmy Robertson** (ENG) **31**–2 James Cahill (ENG)
- Andrew Higginson (ENG) 0–**74** **Julien Leclercq** (BEL)
- **Dylan Emery** (WAL) **46**–31 Wu Yize (CHN)
- **Steven Hallworth** (ENG) **48**–14 Jamie Jones (WAL)
- **Sanderson Lam** (ENG) **62**–30 Haydon Pinhey (ENG)
- **Mark Joyce** (ENG) **38**–6 Rebecca Kenna (ENG)
- **Shaun Murphy** (ENG) **147**–0 Bulcsú Révész (HUN) (Note: Shaun Murphy made the first ever Shoot Out maximum break in his first round match against Bulcsú Révész.)

==== 7 December – 19:00 ====
- **Thepchaiya Un-Nooh** (THA) **41**–26 Liu Hongyu (CHN)
- Himanshu Jain (IND) 51–**60** **Robbie Williams** (ENG)
- He Guoqiang (CHN) 9–**47** **Hammad Miah** (ENG)
- **Peng Yisong** (CHN) **63**–10 Ben Mertens (BEL)
- **David Lilley** (ENG) **99**–28 Reanne Evans (ENG)
- John Astley (ENG) 3–**34** **Victor Sarkis** (BRA)
- **Dean Young** (SCO) **59**–31 David Grace (ENG)
- **Jordan Brown** (NIR) **30**–29 Gary Wilson (ENG)
- **Ashley Carty** (ENG) **39**–2 Jak Jones (WAL)
- **Long Zehuang** (CHN) **52**–24 Tom Ford (ENG)
- **Anthony Hamilton** (ENG) **54**–5 Mink Nutcharut (THA)
- Ahmed Aly Elsayed (USA) 47–**50** **Noppon Saengkham** (THA)
- **Alfie Burden** (ENG) **59**–5 Aaron Hill (IRL)
- Andres Petrov (EST) 19–**31** **Jamie Clarke** (WAL)
- **Robert Milkins** (ENG) **51**–33 Liam Graham (SCO)
- Matthew Selt (ENG) 4–**68** **Mark Williams** (WAL)

=== Round 2 ===
==== 8 December – 13:00 ====
- **Dominic Dale** (WAL) **46**–44 Shaun Murphy (ENG)
- **Dean Young** (SCO) **41**–28 Shaun Liu (HKG)
- **Elliot Slessor** (ENG) **42**–16 Oliver Sykes (ENG)
- Ian Burns (ENG) 0–**90** **Stan Moody** (ENG)
- **Si Jiahui** (CHN) **72**–9 Jordan Brown (NIR)
- **Ali Carter** (ENG) **16**–6 Alfie Burden (ENG)
- Mark Joyce (ENG) 12–**51** **Steven Hallworth** (ENG)
- Lukas Kleckers (GER) 0–**78** **Zhou Yuelong** (CHN)
- **Alexander Ursenbacher** (SUI) **68**–11 Victor Sarkis (BRA)
- Matthew Stevens (WAL) 0–**78** **Thepchaiya Un-Nooh** (THA)
- **Sanderson Lam** (ENG) **58**–5 Andy Hicks (ENG)
- **Liam Pullen** (ENG) **120**–1 Jamie O'Neill (ENG)
- Louis Heathcote (ENG) 42–**57** **Liam Davies** (WAL)
- **David Lilley** (ENG) **54**–25 Jack Borwick (SCO)
- Oliver Brown (ENG) 1–**69** **Mark Allen** (NIR)
- Mostafa Dorgham (EGY) 14–**71** **Kyren Wilson** (ENG)

==== 8 December – 19:00 ====
- Chris Wakelin (ENG) 44–**46** **Joe O'Connor** (ENG)
- Jiang Jun (CHN) 0–**76** **Anthony Hamilton** (ENG)
- **Long Zehuang** (CHN) **68**–7 Noppon Saengkham (THA)
- **Cao Yupeng** (CHN) **51**–0 Julien Leclercq (BEL)
- Jackson Page (WAL) 5–**72** **Graeme Dott** (SCO)
- **Mark Davis** (ENG) **50**–21 Tian Pengfei (CHN)
- David Gilbert (ENG) 36–**40** **Jimmy Robertson** (ENG)
- Robbie Williams (ENG) 8–**62** **Iulian Boiko** (UKR)
- Peng Yisong (CHN) 2–**52** **Michael White** (WAL)
- Barry Pinches (ENG) 31–**68** **Duane Jones** (WAL)
- Alfie Davies (WAL) 28–**58** **Dylan Emery** (WAL)
- **Zak Surety** (ENG) **49**–42 Zhang Anda (CHN)
- **Hammad Miah** (ENG) **30**–9 Mark Williams (WAL)
- **Xu Si** (CHN) **47**–42 Jamie Clarke (WAL)
- **Oliver Lines** (ENG) **56**–16 Robert Milkins (ENG)
- **Ryan Day** (WAL) **48**–20 Ashley Carty (ENG)

=== Round 3 ===
==== 9 December – 13:00 ====
- David Lilley (ENG) 1–**101** **Kyren Wilson** (ENG)
- **Michael White** (WAL) **75**–6 Joe O'Connor (ENG)
- Alexander Ursenbacher (SUI) 12–**48** **Steven Hallworth** (ENG)
- Sanderson Lam (ENG) 36–**58** **Mark Allen** (NIR)
- **Cao Yupeng** (CHN) **44**–6 Thepchaiya Un-Nooh (THA)
- **Iulian Boiko** (UKR) **31**–26 Anthony Hamilton (ENG)
- **Ali Carter** (ENG) **58**–21 Dean Young (SCO)
- Zhou Yuelong (CHN) 23–**66** **Dominic Dale** (WAL)
- Duane Jones (WAL) 40–**56** **Long Zehuang** (CHN)
- **Elliot Slessor** (ENG) **65**–42 Zak Surety (ENG)
- **Liam Davies** (WAL) **40**–33 Dylan Emery (WAL)
- Xu Si (CHN) 9–**20** **Oliver Lines** (ENG)
- **Mark Davis** (ENG) **46**–15 Liam Pullen (ENG)
- Graeme Dott (SCO) 44–**53** **Jimmy Robertson** (ENG)
- Ryan Day (WAL) 0–**112** **Si Jiahui** (CHN)
- **Hammad Miah** (ENG) **61**–34 Stan Moody (ENG)

=== Round 4 ===
==== 9 December – 19:00 ====
- **Dominic Dale** (WAL) **63**–46 Iulian Boiko (UKR)
- Kyren Wilson (ENG) 48–**53** **Si Jiahui** (CHN) (Note: Si Jiahui beat Kyren Wilson in a sudden death blue ball shootout after the match frame finished level at 48–48. Si potted the blue five times to Wilson's four.)
- **Cao Yupeng** (CHN) **31**–16 Hammad Miah (ENG)
- Oliver Lines (ENG) 10–**19** **Mark Allen** (NIR)
- Liam Davies (WAL) 0–**73** **Mark Davis** (ENG)
- Long Zehuang (CHN) 33–**48** **Steven Hallworth** (ENG)
- **Elliot Slessor** (ENG) **50**–36 Jimmy Robertson (ENG)
- Michael White (WAL) 27–**32** **Ali Carter** (ENG)

=== Quarter-finals ===
==== 9 December – 21:00 ====
- **Cao Yupeng** (CHN) **39**–13 Mark Davis (ENG)
- Si Jiahui (CHN) 18–**52** **Mark Allen** (NIR)
- Dominic Dale (WAL) 19–**52** **Steven Hallworth** (ENG)
- **Ali Carter** (ENG) **41**–24 Elliot Slessor (ENG)

=== Semi-finals ===
==== 9 December – 22:00 ====
- **Cao Yupeng** (CHN) **41**–18 Ali Carter (ENG)
- Steven Hallworth (ENG) 8–**60** **Mark Allen** (NIR)

=== Final ===
Final: 1 frame. Referee: Alex Crișan; Swansea Arena, Swansea, Wales, 9 December 2023 – 22:30
Cao Yupeng; China	4–**65**	**Mark Allen**; Northern Ireland

== Century breaks ==
A total of 2 century breaks were made during the tournament.

- 147 – Shaun Murphy
- 101 – Kyren Wilson
