= 2026 World Seniors Championship =

2026 edition of the World Seniors snooker championship

Tournament information
- Dates: 6–10 May 2026
- Venue: Crucible Theatre
- City: Sheffield
- Country: England
- Organisation: World Seniors Tour
- Format: Seniors event
- Total prize fund: £80,000
- Winner's share: £30,000
- Highest break: Ronnie O'Sullivan (ENG) (131); Ali Carter (ENG) (131)

Final
- Champion: Ronnie O'Sullivan (ENG)
- Runner-up: Joe Perry (ENG)
- Score: 10–4

The 2026 World Seniors Championship (officially the 2026 Jenningsbet World Seniors Snooker Championship) was a snooker tournament that took place from 6 to 10 May 2026 at the Crucible Theatre in Sheffield, England, the eighth consecutive year that the tournament was held at the venue. The winner received £30,000 from a total prize fund of £80,000.

Alfie Burden was the defending champion, having defeated Aaron Canavan 8–4 in the 2025 final, but he lost 0–4 to Igor Figueiredo in the second round. Ronnie O'Sullivan, making his debut at the World Seniors Championship, defeated Joe Perry 10–4 in the final to win the tournament. A total of 10 century breaks were made during the tournament, five of them by O'Sullivan in the final. The highest break was a 131, shared by O'Sullivan and Ali Carter.

== Overview ==
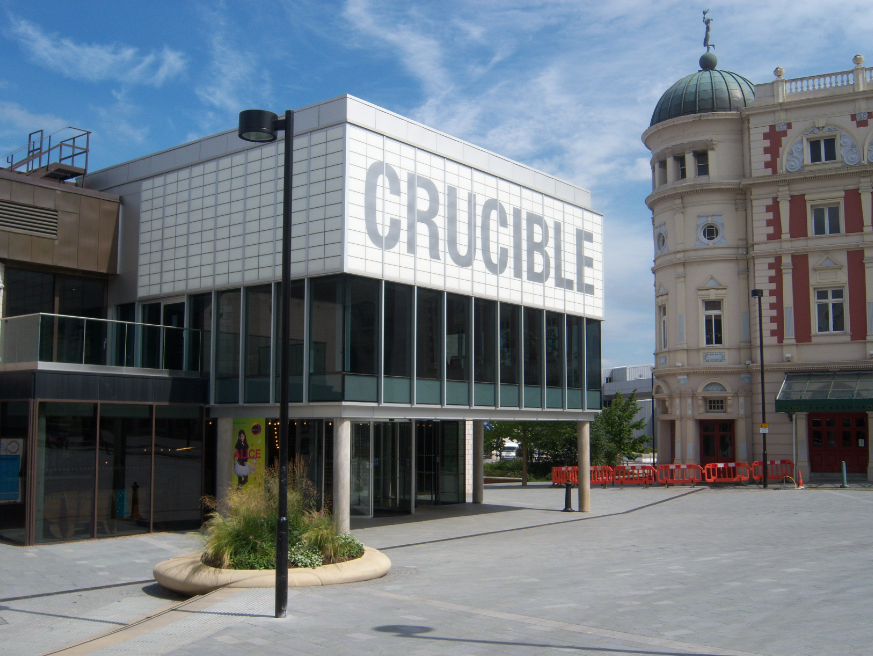
For the eighth consecutive year, the main stage of the tournament was held at the Crucible Theatre in Sheffield, England.

The 2026 World Seniors Championship was a snooker tournament that took place from 6 to 10 May 2026 at the Crucible Theatre in Sheffield, England. Sponsored by bookmaker JenningsBet, the tournament was officially referred to as the 2026 Jenningsbet World Seniors Snooker Championship. Alfie Burden was the defending champion, having defeated Aaron Canavan 8–4 in the 2025 final. Five referees officiated: Mark Beale, Tatiana Woollaston, Rod Eaton, Proletina Velichkova, and David Brown.

Cliff Wilson won the inaugural staging of the World Seniors Championship, held in 1991. The event was not held again until the 2010 edition, when Jimmy White defeated Steve Davis in the final. It has been held every season since that time. Since the 2019 edition, the tournament has been held at the Crucible Theatre. (Note: It was held in Scunthorpe in 2018. It moved to the Crucible Theatre in 2019, where it also remained for the 2020, 2021, 2022, 2023, 2024, and 2025 editions.)

=== Format ===
Matches up to and including the quarter-finals were played as the best of 7 frames. The semi-finals were played as the best of 13 frames. The final was a best-of-19-frame match. Played under a variation of the standard rules, there were no deciding frames, with ties resolved with a black-ball shoot out instead. There was also a 30-second shot clock in operation. The initial rounds feature a two-table setup.

=== Participants ===
The number of participants was increased to 24 for this edition. The first round featured the 2024 World Seniors Champion and current Pan American Seniors Champion Igor Figueiredo, the European Seniors Champion Craig Steadman, the African Seniors Champion Mohamed Elkhayat and the Pan Asian Seniors Champion Roger Farebrother. Daniel Ward received a place in the first round after winning a qualifying tournament featuring 16 players. (Note: Ward, Dharminder Lilly, Jamie Curtis-Barrett, Matthew Day, Dean Galbally, Tam Mustafa, Neil Craycraft, Steve Crowly, Matt Ford, Stephen Groves, Andrew Norman, Billy Ginn, Marc Shaw, Mark Love, Daniel Stott, and Philip Williams.)

The defending champion Alfie Burden was the first seed for the tournament, while Joe Perry was the second as winner of the 2025 British Seniors Open. They were seeded through to the second round along with third seed Nigel Bond (who replaced Mark Williams after the latter withdrew), Ronnie O'Sullivan (4), Stuart Bingham (5), Ali Carter (6), Matthew Stevens (7), and Robert Milkins (8). The eight seeds played the eight first-round winners in the second round.

=== Prize fund ===
The winner received £30,000 from a total prize fund of £80,000.

=== Broadcasters ===
The tournament was broadcast in the United Kingdom by 5, while Pluto TV provided streaming both for the UK and internationally for Australia, Austria, Brazil, Canada, Denmark, France, Italy, Mexico, Norway, Spain, Sweden, and Switzerland. Rigour Media broadcast the event in China.

== Summary ==
=== First round ===
The first round featured 16 unseeded players, with matches played as the best of 7 frames. Craig Steadman eliminated Neal Jones with a 4–0 whitewash. Facing the 2018 winner Igor Figueiredo, Mohamed Elkhayat won the first frame, but Figueiredo took the next three. Elkhayat halved the deficit at 2–3, but Figueiredo won frame six for victory. Aaron Canavan, the 2018 World Seniors Champion and runner-up in the 2025 edition, defeated Reanne Evans 4–2. Roger Farebrother, making his debut at the Crucible Theatre, progressed with a 4–2 win over Tony Drago.

Ken Doherty, the 1997 World Snooker Champion, made breaks of 50 and 88 against Gerard Greene. The match went to a black-ball shoot out, which Doherty won. Dominic Dale compiled a 92 break as he whitewashed Wayne Townsend. Peter Lines built a 3–0 lead against Anthony Hamilton and went on to win 4–2. (Note: The World Professional Billiards and Snooker Association source has the score incorrectly as 4–1, but snooker.org has 4–2.) Jimmy White compiled breaks of 85, 74, and 50 in a 4–1 defeat of Daniel Ward.

=== Second round ===
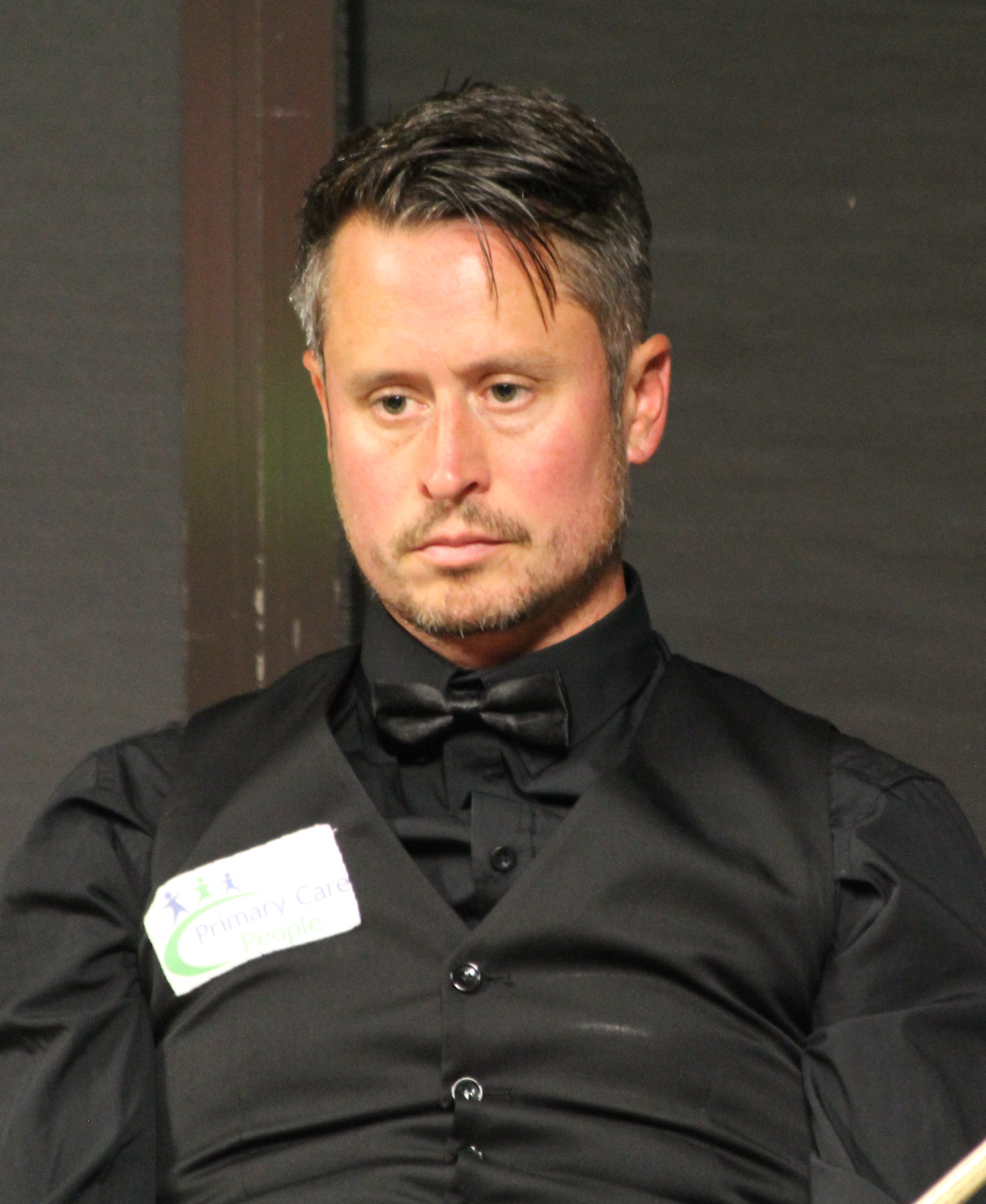
The defending champion, Alfie Burden, was whitewashed by Igor Figueiredo in the second round. The match had to be played on a practice table.

The second round featured the eight seeded players and the unseeded players who progressed from the first round, with matches played as the best of 7 frames. Facing Robert Milkins, four-time World Seniors Champion White made an 86 break in the sixth frame to force a black-ball shoot out, which Milkins won. The defending champion, Alfie Burden, was whitewashed by Figueiredo, who manufactured breaks of 68, 56, and 72. There were issues with the table cloth and the match was played behind closed doors, on a practice table. "I wasn't in the mental state of mind to play that match in a practice room to be honest. I was in a state of shock at what was unfolding. Literally heartbroken," Burden wrote.

Ali Carter won the first two frames of his match against Farebrother with breaks of 83 and 60. Farebrother replied with a break of 80 in the next frame and also made a break of 70 in frame five to go 2–3 behind. Carter won the match in frame six with a 94 break. In a match that was delayed due to the issues with one of the tables and finished after midnight, Dale produced a century break of 101, but he lost 2–4 against Matthew Stevens.

Stuart Bingham, the 2015 World Champion, made a 127 break against Lines. Lines won 4–2, producing a 70 break in the last frame. Nigel Bond took a two-frame lead against Steadman, who then levelled the match. The scores were tied again at 3–3, and Steadman advanced as Bond lost the black-ball shoot out due to a time foul. Ronnie O'Sullivan, making his debut at the World Seniors Championship, defeated Doherty 4–1. The 2025 British Seniors Open winner Joe Perry eliminated Canavan with a 4–2 result.

=== Quarter-finals ===
The quarter-finals were played on 8 May as the best of 7 frames. Figueireedo won the first frame against Milkins. Milkins made breaks of 50, 58, and 72 as he won four in a row for victory. Carter took the lead against Steadman, who then won frames two and three to go in front, compiling a 60 break in the third. Carter produced a 78 break to tie the scores, but Steadman won the next. A century break of 131 by Carter in frame six forced a black-ball shoot out, which Steadman won.

O'Sullivan took the first frame with a break of 84, but Lines replied with half-centuries of 69 and 93 in the next two frames to take the lead. O'Sullivan produced breaks of 109, 65, and 70 to progress to the semi-finals. There was a half-century in every frame of the match. The first two frames between Stevens and Perry were shared. Perry then won the next three for a 4–1 victory.

=== Semi-finals ===
The semi-finals were played on 9 May as the best of 13 frames. The first two frames of the match between Milkins and O'Sullivan were shared, with both players making half-centuries. The scores were again tied at 2–2, 3–3, and 4–4. O'Sullivan went on to secure a place in the final with a 7–5 result. In the other semi-final, Steadman built a 3–0 lead. Perry then won five consecutive frames, producing breaks of 64 and 88. Steadman reduced the deficit in frame nine. Perry took the tenth with a 54 break. Steadman won the next to edge closer at 5–6, but Perry produced a century break of 102 to win the match.

=== Final ===
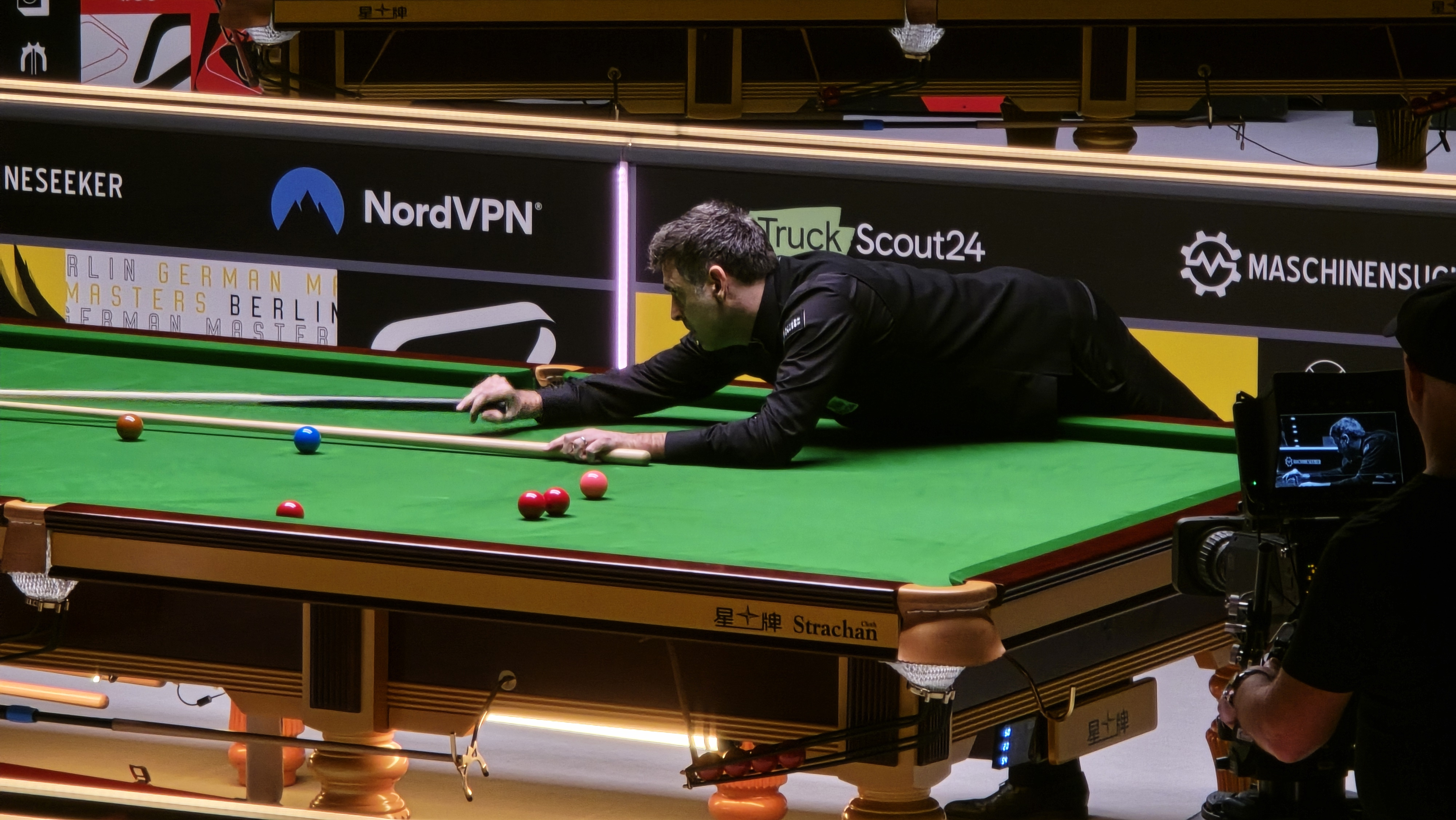
Ronnie O'Sullivan (pictured in 2026) made five century breaks as he defeated Joe Perry 10–4 in the final.

The final was played on 10 May as the best of 19 frames, between the fourth seed O'Sullivan and the second seed Perry. Referee Proletina Velichkova officiated the final. O'Sullivan made back-to-back century breaks of 109 and 131 to win the first two frames. Perry won the third, but O'Sullivan made another century break in frame four. O'Sullivan was 5–3 ahead at the conclusion of the first session. When play was resumed, Perry took frame nine to reduce the deficit to only one. O'Sullivan won five consecutive frames, featuring century breaks of 129 and 100, to claim victory with a 10–4 result. "I have not been playing great these three years, my confidence is quite low and when I was getting into little situations, I was missing a few. [...] But if I can get my confidence going then I would like to finish my career on a strong note, so that is my ambition left in the game," O'Sullivan said.

== Main draw ==
The results for the main draw are shown below. The numbers in parentheses after the players' names denote the seedings. Match winners are shown in bold.

**Round 1 (Last 24)**; Best of 7 frames
**Igor Figueiredo (BRA)**	**4**
Mohamed Elkhayat (EGY)	2
**Jimmy White (ENG)**	**4**
Daniel Ward (ENG)	1
**Peter Lines (ENG)**	**4**
Anthony Hamilton (ENG)	2
**Ken Doherty (IRL)**	**4**
Gerard Greene (NIR)	3
**Craig Steadman (ENG)**	**4**
Neal Jones (ENG)	0
Tony Drago (MLT)	2
**Roger Farebrother (AUS)**	**4**
**Dominic Dale (WAL)**	**4**
Wayne Townsend (ENG)	0
Reanne Evans (ENG)	2
**Aaron Canavan (JER)**	**4**

**Round 2 (Last 16)**; Best of 7 frames
Alfie Burden (ENG) (1)	0
**Igor Figueiredo (BRA)**	**4**
**Robert Milkins (ENG) (8)**	**4**
Jimmy White (ENG)	3
Stuart Bingham (ENG) (5)	2
**Peter Lines (ENG)**	**4**
**Ronnie O'Sullivan (ENG) (4)**	**4**
Ken Doherty (IRL)	1
Nigel Bond (ENG) (3) (Note: Nigel Bond replaced Mark Williams, who withdrew.)	3
**Craig Steadman (ENG)**	**4**
**Ali Carter (ENG) (6)**	**4**
Roger Farebrother (AUS)	2
**Matthew Stevens (WAL) (7)**	**4**
Dominic Dale (WAL)	2
**Joe Perry (ENG) (2)**	**4**
Aaron Canavan (JER)	2

**Quarter-finals**; Best of 7 frames
Igor Figueiredo (BRA)	1
**Robert Milkins (ENG) (8)**	**4**
Peter Lines (ENG)	2
**Ronnie O'Sullivan (ENG) (4)**	**4**
**Craig Steadman (ENG)**	**4**
Ali Carter (ENG) (6)	3
Matthew Stevens (WAL) (7)	1
**Joe Perry (ENG) (2)**	**4**

**Semi-finals**; Best of 13 frames
Robert Milkins (ENG) (8)	5
**Ronnie O'Sullivan (ENG) (4)**	**7**
Craig Steadman (ENG)	5
**Joe Perry (ENG) (2)**	**7**

**Final**; Best of 19 frames
**Ronnie O'Sullivan (ENG) (4)**	**10**
Joe Perry (ENG) (2)	4

=== Final: frame scores ===
Final: Best of 19 frames. Referee: Proletina Velichkova; Crucible Theatre, Sheffield, England, 10 May 2026
**Ronnie O'Sullivan** (4); England	**10**–4	Joe Perry (2); England
Afternoon: **109**–6 (109), **131**–7 (131), 22–**118**, **113**–0 (113), **81**–9, 41–**72**, 68–**70**, **75**–24; Evening: 35–**69**, **87**–36, **129**–0 (129), **89**–9, **70**–41, **100**–0 (100)
(frame 2) **131**	Highest break	67 (frame 6)
**5**	Century breaks	0

== Century breaks ==
A total of 10 century breaks were made during the tournament.

- 131, 129, 113, 109, 109, 100 – Ronnie O'Sullivan
- 131 – Ali Carter
- 127 – Stuart Bingham
- 102 – Joe Perry
- 101 – Dominic Dale
