= 2025 World Seniors Championship =

2025 edition of the World Seniors snooker championship

Tournament information
- Dates: 7–11 May 2025
- Venue: Crucible Theatre
- City: Sheffield
- Country: England
- Organisation: World Seniors Tour
- Format: Seniors event
- Highest break: Dominic Dale (WAL) (131)

Final
- Champion: Alfie Burden (ENG)
- Runner-up: Aaron Canavan (JEY)
- Score: 8–4

The 2025 World Seniors Championship (officially the 2025 JenningsBet World Seniors Championship) was a snooker tournament that took place from 7 to 11 May 2025 at the Crucible Theatre in Sheffield, England, the seventh consecutive year that the tournament was held at the venue. Open to amateur players over 40 and professional players who were over 45 and also ranked outside the top 64 in the snooker world rankings, the event was the 16th edition of the World Seniors Championship, first held in 1991. Organised by the World Seniors Tour, the event was broadcast in the United Kingdom by Channel 5 and internationally by other broadcasters.

Igor Figueiredo was the defending champion, having defeated Ken Doherty 5‍–‍2 in the 2024 final, but he lost 2‍–‍4 to Wayne Townsend in the first round. Alfie Burden held leads of 4‍–‍1 and 7‍–‍2 against Aaron Canavan in the final and went on to win 8‍–‍4 to claim his first World Seniors title.

The tournament produced five century breaks, four of which were compiled by Dominic Dale, who also made the highest, a 131 in his semi-final match against Canavan. The final of the event was Michaela Tabb's last appearance as a traditional snooker referee, following a 24-year career during which she had refereed two World Championship finals.

== Overview ==
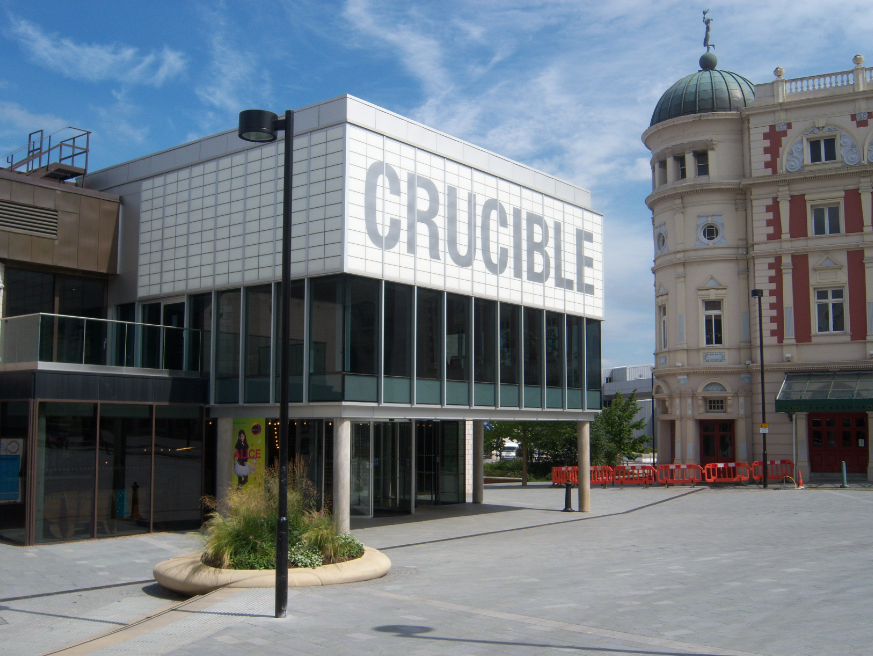
For the seventh consecutive year, the main stage of the tournament was held at the Crucible Theatre in Sheffield, England.

The 2025 World Seniors Championship was a snooker tournament that took place from 7 to 11 May 2025 at the Crucible Theatre in Sheffield, England. The 16th edition of the World Seniors Championship, first played in 1991, it was held at the Crucible for the seventh consecutive year (Note: It was held in Scunthorpe in 2018. It moved to the Crucible Theatre in 2019, where it also remained for the 2020, 2021, 2022, 2023, 2024 and 2025 editions.) and sponsored by bookmaker JenningsBet. A World Seniors Tour event, the tournament was open to amateur players over 40 and professional players over 45, who also needed to be ranked outside the top 64 in the snooker world rankings. The event was broadcast in the United Kingdom on Channel 5 and by other broadcasters internationally. Igor Figueiredo was the defending champion, having defeated Ken Doherty 5‍–‍2 in the 2024 final. Four referees officiated: Mark Beale, Michaela Tabb, Rod Eaton, and Proletina Velichkova.

=== Participants ===
Figueiredo, as the defending champion, was given the top seed. Other seeded players were Doherty, four-time winner of the event Jimmy White, Tony Drago and Tony Knowles. Joe Perry and Dominic Dale retired as professional players after their defeats in the qualifying stages of the 2025 World Championship, making them eligible to compete. Several players had to qualify. The winner of the 2018 edition, Aaron Canavan, as well as Andrew Norman, Gerard Greene and Townsend, qualified for the event during the so-called Race to the Crucible Series. Four more players qualified through various continental Seniors Championships: Craig Steadman won in Europe, Hassan Kerde in Asia-Pacific, Charl Jonck in Africa and Fabio Luersen in the Americas. Alfie Burden defeated Andy Lavin, Rodney Goggins, Stuart Watson and Matthew Ford to win the Golden Ticket tournament to qualify for the final stages.

=== Prize fund ===
The winner of the event received £20,000, with the runner-up earning £10,000.

== Summary ==
=== First round ===
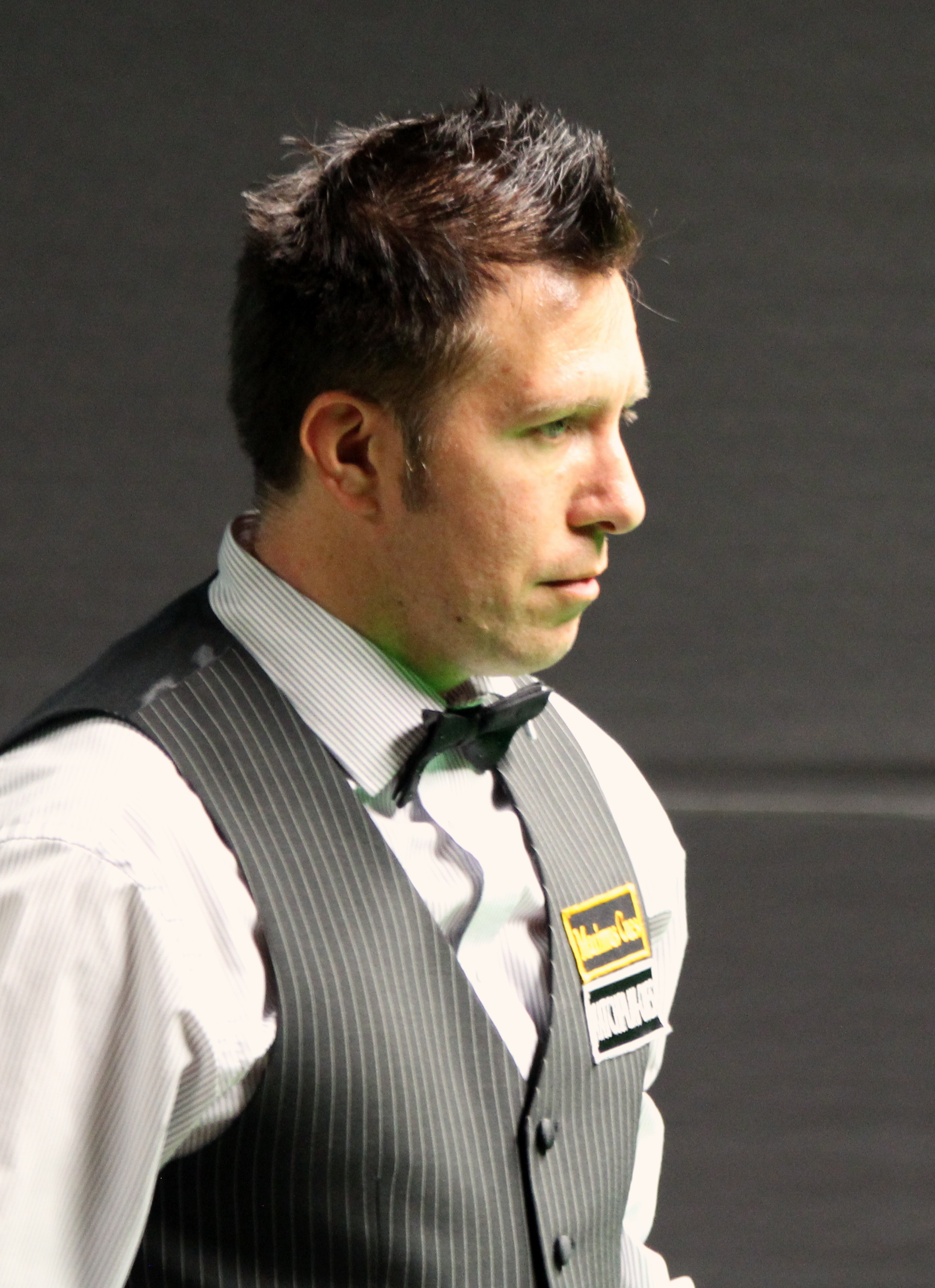
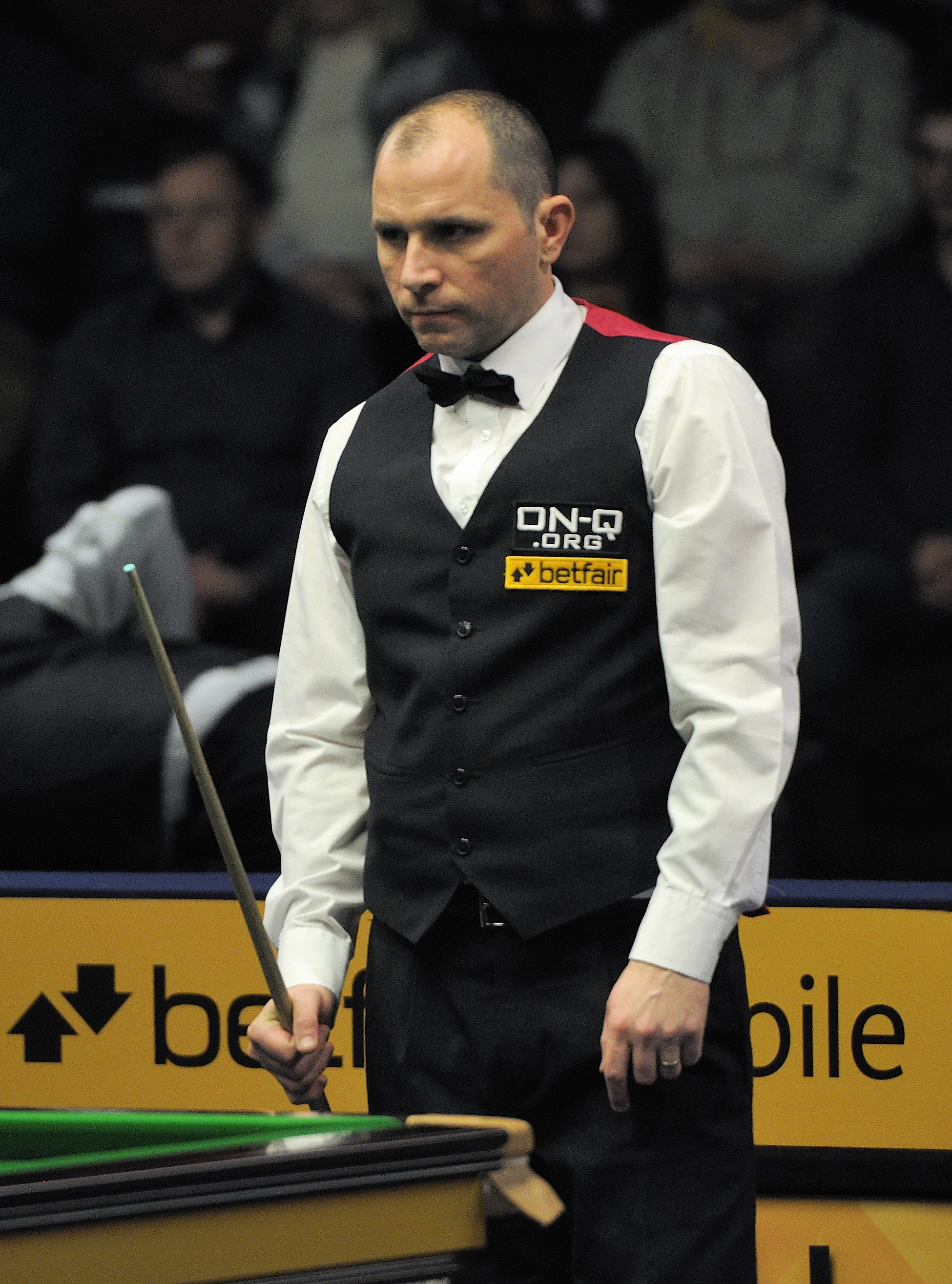
Dominic Dale (pictured left in 2016) and Joe Perry (pictured right in 2013) both made their debut in the World Seniors Championship after retiring from professional competition.

The first round took place on 7 and 8 May, each match played as the best of 7 frames. Joe Perry made two breaks of 76 to take a 2‍–‍0 lead against Fabio Luersen and also compiled a 94 and a 59 to win 4‍–‍2. "I was a little bit nervous which I was pleased about, I didn't want to be flat and not care," Perry said. Craig Steadman recovered from 0‍–‍2 against Dominic Dale to tie the scores, but Dale then won the fifth frame and compiled a century break of 107 in the sixth to clinch a 4‍–‍2 victory. "To win a tournament at the Crucible would be fantastic—it's a special place to play," Dale said. Wayne Townsend won the first frame of the match against the defending champion, Igor Figueiredo, with a break of 53 and on the final black ball. Figueiredo replied with a half-century of his own and then took the lead at 2‍–‍1. Townsend won three frames on the spin, the last one again on the final black, to seal victory. "I'm on cloud nine. I was playing the world champion and I've knocked him out! There's no reason why I can't be the world champion and there is nobody here I can't beat," Townsend said after the match. Aaron Canavan manufactured breaks of 51, 89, 72 and 51 to defeat Andrew Norman 4‍–‍1. "If you enjoy it then the chances are that you will play better," Canavan conceded afterwards.

Alfie Burden faced Jimmy White, winner of the event in 2010, 2019, 2020 and 2023. Burden won the first two frames, but White produced a 82 break in the third to halve the deficit. Burden won the fourth frame on the re-spotted black and manufactured a 92 break in the fifth to advance into the quarter-finals. Burden commented after the match that he had first practiced with White when he was 15 years old and that he was sure White would want him to go on to win the tournament now: "We've had this amazing friendship for many years and I don't get any pleasure in beating Jimmy [White] but I was focused on winning and I had to blank out who I was playing." Ken Doherty took a 2‍–‍0 lead against Charl Jonck, but Jonck went on to win four consecutive frames, featuring breaks of 64 and 63, to win the match. "That was surreal. It was the lifelong ambition becoming a reality," Jonck said. Tony Drago compiled a 75 break in the first frame of his duel with Gerard Greene. The match went into a decider, which Drago won aided by a break of 68. Hassan Kerde whitewashed Tony Knowles, making breaks of 53, 62, 66 and 59 in the process. "I'm over the moon. I've watched the Crucible for the last 20 years and to just come and watch a match would have been awesome," Kerde said afterwards.

=== Quarter-finals ===
The quarter-finals took place on 9 May, each match played as the best of 7 frames. Dale compiled breaks of 97, 99 and 128 as he beat Perry 4‍–‍1. "I've been practicing hard here and I've found some form. I was confident going into the match," Dale commented. In his match against Burden, Drago won the first frame and then took two consecutive frames on the re-spotted black to edge 3‍–‍0 in front. Burden won four on the spin, featuring breaks of 53 and 51, to advance into the semi-finals.

Kerde and Jonck shared the first four frames, but Kerde then took two, one of them with a break of 85, to win the match. "I'm the first person to come from Australia and reach the semi-finals of the World Seniors Snooker Championship and hopefully I can do the country proud," Kerde said. Canavan took a 3‍–‍1 lead against Townsend, who compiled an 85 break in the fifth frame to halve the deficit. Canavan went on to take the following frame and seal victory with a 4‍–‍2 result.

=== Semi-finals ===
The semi-finals took place on 10 May, both matches played as the best of 11 frames. Burden produced breaks of 57 and 65 as he took a 4‍–‍0 lead against Kerde. Kerde replied by winning two consecutive frames and halving the deficit, but Burden made a break of 97 to go 5‍–‍2 in front and won the following frame to clinch victory. "It was a tough game but I was pleased with the way I played and it stands me in good stead for the final," Burden said afterwards.

Canavan and Dale shared the first four frames of their semi-final. Dale then made back-to-back century breaks, of 109 and 131, and won another frame to go within one of victory at 5‍–‍2. Canavan, however, won four consecutive frames, including the decider, to book a place in the final. "It was tough. After last night, I was really tired but I gave myself a good talking to in the dressing room and came out fighting," Canavan confessed.

=== Final ===
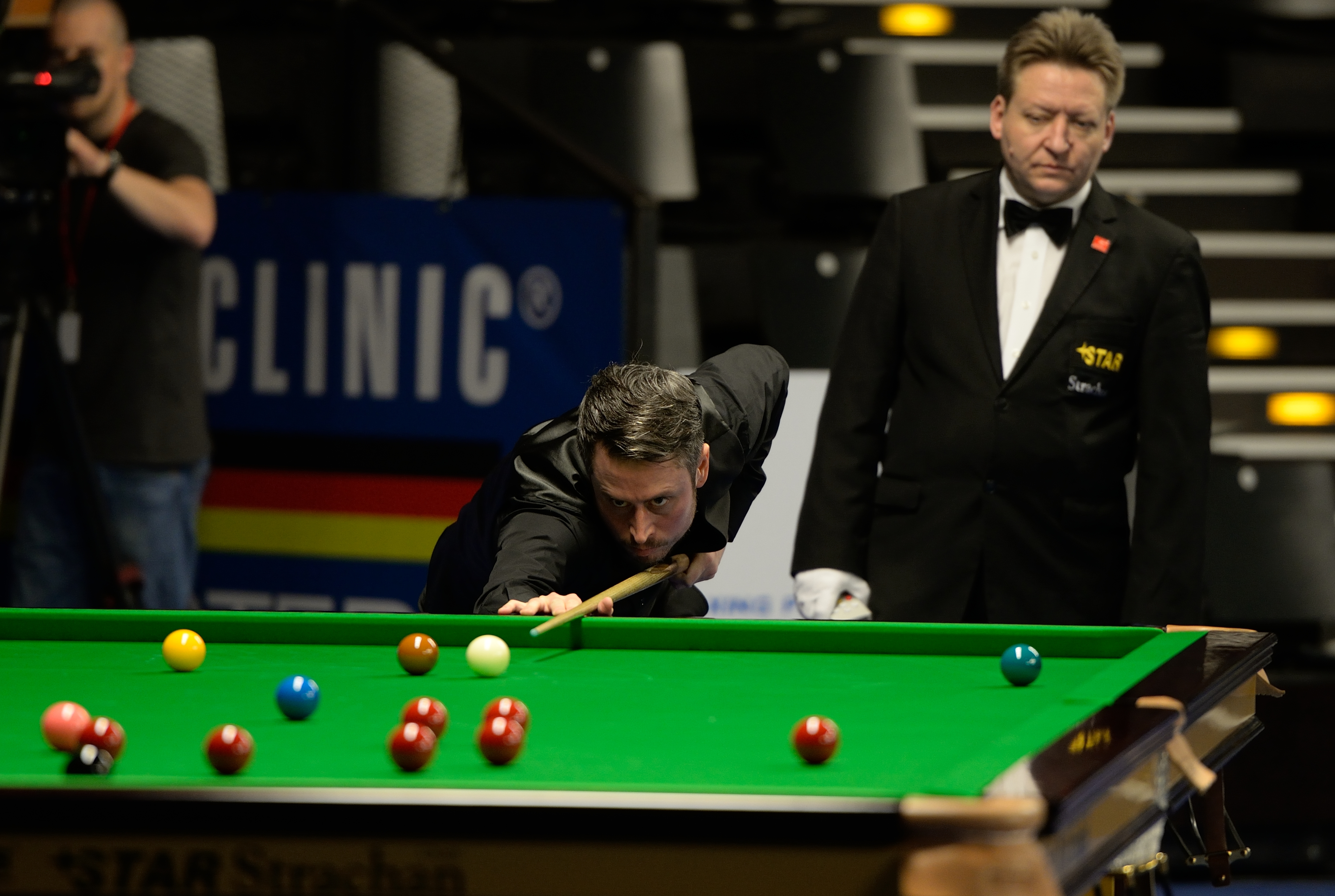
Alfie Burden (pictured in 2015) defeated Aaron Canavan 8‍–‍4 in the final to claim his first World Seniors Championship title.

On 11 May, Burden and Canavan contested the best-of-15-frame final, which was divided into three mini-sessions of five frames each. Both players were competing in a World Seniors final for the second time, Canavan having won the title in 2018 and Burden having been runner-up in 2023. The first five-frame mini-session was refereed by Michaela Tabb, who retired from traditional snooker refereeing after the tournament, following a 24-year career that had included two World Championship finals. Canavan won the opening frame, but Burden then won four consecutive frames with breaks including 74 and 54 as he moved 4–1 ahead. Proletina Velichkova refereed the remainder of the final.

Canavan won the first frame of the second mini-session, but Burden took three consecutive frames with breaks of 65, 109, and 80. Canavan won the 8th frame to leave Burden leading 7–3. The third and final mini-session lasted two frames, as Canavan won frame 11 but Burden made a 76 break in the 12th to secure an 8–4 victory and win his first World Seniors title. He said afterwards: "I'm absolutely delighted. I thought I played well in the final. It's been a massive journey with so many ups and downs. I think it's been well documented that I think I've underachieved in my career but you've got to enjoy this moment."

== Main draw ==
The results for the main draw are shown below. Match winners are shown in bold. Numbers in parentheses after the players' names are seedings.

**First round** Best of 7 frames
7 May
Igor Figueiredo (BRA) (1)	2
**Wayne Townsend (ENG)**	**4**
7 May
**Aaron Canavan (JEY) (8)**	**4**
Andrew Norman (ENG)	1
7 May
**Dominic Dale (WAL) (5)**	**4**
Craig Steadman (ENG)	2
7 May
**Joe Perry (ENG) (4)**	**4**
Fabio Luersen (BRA)	2
8 May
Jimmy White (ENG) (3)	1
**Alfie Burden (ENG)**	**4**
8 May
**Tony Drago (MLT) (6)**	**4**
Gerard Greene (NIR)	3
8 May
Tony Knowles (ENG) (7)	0
**Hassan Kerde (AUS)**	**4**
8 May
Ken Doherty (IRL) (2)	2
**Charl Jonck (RSA)**	**4**

**Quarter-finals**; Best of 7 frames
9 May
(England) Wayne Townsend	2
**(Jersey) Aaron Canavan (8)**	**4**
9 May
**(Wales) Dominic Dale (5)**	**4**
(England) Joe Perry (4)	1
9 May
**(England) Alfie Burden**	**4**
(Malta) Tony Drago (6)	3
9 May
**(Australia) Hassan Kerde**	**4**
(South Africa) Charl Jonck	2

**Semi-finals**; Best of 11 frames
10 May
**(Jersey) Aaron Canavan (8)**	**6**
(Wales) Dominic Dale (5)	5
10 May
**(England) Alfie Burden**	**6**
(Australia) Hassan Kerde	2

**Final**; Best of 15 frames
11 May
(Jersey) Aaron Canavan (8)	4
**(England) Alfie Burden**	**8**

=== Final ===
Final: Best of 15 frames. Referees: Michaela Tabb (session 1) and Proletina Velichkova (sessions 2 and 3); Crucible Theatre, Sheffield, 11 May 2025
Aaron Canavan (8); Jersey	4–**8**	**Alfie Burden**; England
Session 1: **66**–48, 11–**108**, 14–**87**, 20–**78**, 7–**71**; Session 2: **81**–57, 14–**98**, 13–**114** (109), 0–**81**, **78**–32; Session 3: **71**–48, 15–**88**
(frame 6) 75	Highest break	**109** (frame 8)
0	Century breaks	**1**
2025 World Seniors Champion; **Alfie Burden** (ENG)

== Century breaks ==
A total of 5 century breaks were made during the tournament.

- 131, 128, 109, 107 – Dominic Dale
- 109 – Alfie Burden
