= World Seniors Tour =

Professional senior players snooker tour

- Sport: Snooker (senior)
- Jurisdiction: International
- Founded: 2017
- Affiliation: Snooker Legends (2017–2018); World Senior Snooker (2018–)
- Headquarters: Bristol, United Kingdom
- Chairman: Jason Francis

Official website
- seniorssnooker.com

The World Seniors Tour is the snooker tour for senior players currently organised by World Seniors Snooker, a subsidiary of the World Professional Billiards and Snooker Association.

World Seniors Tour events are open to all snooker players aged 40 or older, including current professionals who are ranked outside the top 64 in the snooker world rankings. Winners of the UK Seniors Championship and World Seniors Championship earn places in the World Snooker Championship qualifying rounds.

== History ==
The tour was created and run by the company Snooker Legends in 2017, after it first staged the 2017 World Seniors Championship.

The World Seniors Tour began with a series of four non-ranking events in the 2017–18 season: the UK Seniors Championship, the Seniors Irish Masters, the Seniors Masters and the World Seniors Championship.

In 2018, a newly formed company called World Seniors Snooker took over the running of the tour. Six events were to take place during the 2018–19 season. However, only four of the events were staged. The European Seniors Open was cancelled and the World Seniors Championship was postponed in March 2019. It was pushed back and played in August 2019, becoming the first event of the 2019–20 season. Other qualifying events for amateurs were held in Canada, Hong Kong, Belgium and the United States.

The 2019–20 season of the World Seniors Tour was affected by the COVID-19 pandemic. The Seniors Masters, Seniors Irish Masters, 6 Red World Championship and a new event, the British Seniors Open, were all cancelled. Due to the ongoing coronavirus situation the 2020-21 seniors season was restricted to just a seniors Q-School in January 2021, and the 2021 World Seniors Championship in May, at the Crucible Theatre.

== Event winners ==
Season	Tournament	Winner	Runner-up	Score	City	Ref.
2017–18	UK Seniors Championship	(England) Jimmy White	(Republic of Ireland) Ken Doherty	4–2	(England) Redhill	
2017–18	Seniors Irish Masters	(England) Steve Davis	(England) Johnathan Bagley	4–0	(Republic of Ireland) Kill	
2017–18	World Seniors Championship	(Jersey) Aaron Canavan	(Northern Ireland) Patrick Wallace	4–3	(England) Scunthorpe	
2017–18	Seniors Masters	(Canada) Cliff Thorburn	(England) Johnathan Bagley	2–1	(England) Sheffield	
2018–19	UK Seniors Championship	(Republic of Ireland) Ken Doherty	(Brazil) Igor Figueiredo	4–1	(England) Hull	
2018–19	Seniors Irish Masters	(England) Jimmy White	(Republic of Ireland) Rodney Goggins	4–1	(Republic of Ireland) Kill	
2018–19	Seniors 6-Red World Championship	(England) Jimmy White	(Jersey) Aaron Canavan	4–2	(Northern Ireland) Belfast	
2018–19	Seniors Masters	(England) Joe Johnson	(England) Barry Pinches	2–1	(England) Sheffield	
2018–19	World Seniors Championship	(England) Jimmy White	(Wales) Darren Morgan	5–3	(England) Sheffield	
2019–20	UK Seniors Championship	(Republic of Ireland) Michael Judge	(England) Jimmy White	4–2	(England) Hull	
2019–20	World Seniors Championship	(England) Jimmy White	(Republic of Ireland) Ken Doherty	5–4	(England) Sheffield	
2020–21	World Seniors Championship	(England) David Lilley	(England) Jimmy White	5–3	(England) Sheffield	
2021–22	UK Seniors Championship	(England) Peter Lines	(England) David Lilley	5–1	(England) Hull	
2021–22	World Seniors Championship	(Wales) Lee Walker	(England) Jimmy White	5–4	(England) Sheffield	
2022–23	World Seniors Championship	(England) Jimmy White	(England) Alfie Burden	5–3	(England) Sheffield	
2023–24	World Seniors Tour - Event 1 (Note: Played in Snooker 900 format)	(Scotland) Stephen Hendry	(England) Jimmy White	1–0	(England) Epsom	
2023–24	World Seniors Tour - Event 2	(Republic of Ireland) Ken Doherty	(England) Jimmy White	2–1	(Republic of Ireland) Kill	
2023–24	World Seniors Championship	(Brazil) Igor Figueiredo	(Republic of Ireland) Ken Doherty	5–2	(England) Sheffield	
2024–25	World Seniors Tour - Event 1	(Brazil) Igor Figueiredo	(England) Jimmy White	2–1	(England) Hull	
2024–25	World Seniors Tour - Event 2	(Republic of Ireland) Ken Doherty	(Malta) Tony Drago	2–1	(England) Epsom	
2024–25	World Seniors Championship	(England) Alfie Burden	(Jersey) Aaron Canavan	8–4	(England) Sheffield	
2025–26	World Seniors Tour - Event 1-9	Most wins: (Northern Ireland) Gerrard Greene (4)			(England) Reading	
2025–26	British Seniors Open	(England) Joe Perry	(England) Jimmy White	7–5	(England) Derby	
2025–26	World Seniors Championship	(England) Ronnie O'Sullivan	(England) Joe Perry	10–4	(England) Sheffield	
