= 2021 World Seniors Championship =

2021 edition of the World Seniors snooker championship

Tournament information
- Dates: 6–9 May 2021
- Venue: Crucible Theatre
- City: Sheffield
- Country: England
- Organisation: World Seniors Snooker
- Format: Seniors event
- Winner's share: £15,000
- Highest break: Darren Morgan (WAL) (134)

Final
- Champion: David Lilley (ENG)
- Runner-up: Jimmy White (ENG)
- Score: 5–3

The 2021 World Seniors Championship (officially the 2021 ROKiT World Seniors Snooker Championship) was an invitational senior snooker tournament that took place from 6 to 9 May 2021 at the Crucible Theatre in Sheffield, England, the third consecutive year that the tournament was held at the venue. Open to players over 40 who were ranked outside the top 64 in the snooker world rankings, the event was the 12th edition of the World Seniors Championship, first held in 1991. Organised by World Seniors Snooker, the event was broadcast domestically by the BBC and internationally by other broadcasters.

The main stage featured 16 competitors. Former world champions Ken Doherty, Stephen Hendry, John Parrott, Joe Johnson and Dennis Taylor were among the invited players. COVID-19 travel restrictions meant that three of the players originally invited—the 1980 world champion Cliff Thorburn, Tony Drago and Bob Chaperon—were unable to take up their places. The 1977 UK champion Patsy Fagan, the former world number two Tony Knowles and the WSF Seniors champion Igor Figueiredo were chosen to replace them.

Jimmy White was the defending champion, having won the 2020 edition with a 5‍–‍4 victory against Ken Doherty in the final. White reached the final for the third year in a row, but lost 3‍–‍5 to David Lilley, who won the title for the first time and thus qualified for the 2021 Champion of Champions.

== Overview ==
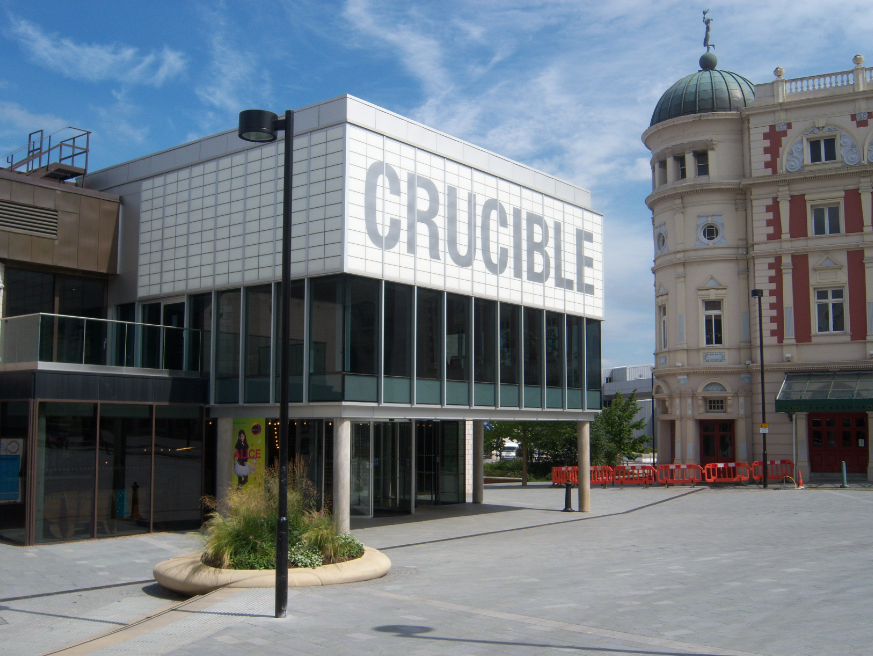
The main stage of the event was held at the Crucible Theatre in Sheffield for a third consecutive year.

The 2021 World Seniors Championship was a snooker tournament that took place from 6 to 9 May 2021 at the Crucible Theatre in Sheffield, England. The 12th edition of the World Seniors Championship, first contested in 1991, it was held at the Crucible for the third consecutive year and sponsored for the third time by ROKiT. (Note: It was held in Scunthorpe in 2018, with no sponsor. It moved to the Crucible Theatre in 2019, where it also remained for the 2020 edition. On both occasions, ROKiT was the sponsor.) A World Seniors Tour event, the tournament was open to players over 40 who were ranked outside the top 64 in the snooker world rankings. The event was broadcast domestically on the BBC, in China by Zhibo TV, Superstar Online, Migu and Huya and in all other territories by Matchroom Sport.

=== Participants ===
The main stage of the event featured sixteen competitors. Having defeated Ken Doherty in the 2020 edition, Jimmy White was the defending champion. Alongside him, five former world champions—Doherty, Stephen Hendry, John Parrott, Joe Johnson and Dennis Taylor—were invited to take part in the tournament. A few of the invited players had to be replaced due to the travel restricitions imposed because of the COVID-19 pandemic. The 1980 world champion Cliff Thorburn was replaced by Patsy Fagan, who had won the 1977 UK Championship; Tony Drago was replaced by Tony Knowles, and Igor Figueiredo took Bob Chaperon's place. Lee Walker was able to compete, having just lost his place in the professional tour. The field was completed by Michael Judge, Barry Pinches, David Lilley, Darren Morgan, Philip Williams and Patrick Wallace. The eight seeds were drawn randomly against the other eight players during a draw that took place during the 2021 World Championship.

=== Prize fund ===
The winner of the event received £15,000. The breakdown of prize money is shown below:

- Winner: £15,000
- Runner-up: £7,000
- Semi-finalists: £3,000
- Quarter-finalists: £2,000
- Highest break: £1,500

== Summary ==
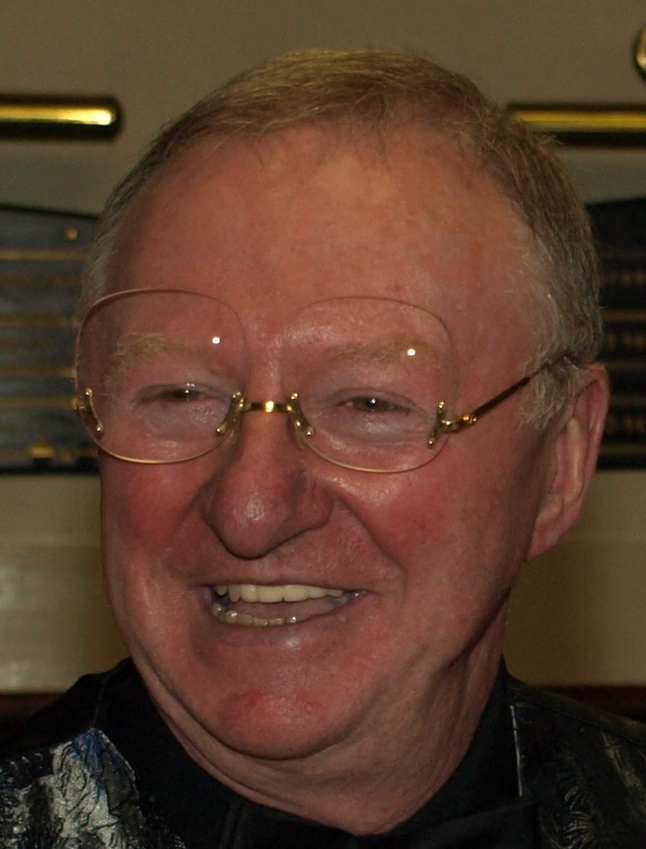
The 1985 world champion Dennis Taylor (pictured in 2009) was whitewashed in his first-round match against Barry Pinches and announced his retirement after a 49-year-long career.

The first round of the event was played as best-of-5-frame matches on 6 and 7 May. White, two-time champion, kicked-off his defence of the title with a whitewash over Knowles. "It was a bit of a struggle there but I think the excitement gets to us old boys when we come to the Crucible!" White said after the match. There were four further whitewashes at this stage: Figueiredo, who became the first player from South America to play at the Crucible in a competitive match, defeated the 1991 world champion Parrott; the seven-time world champion Hendry won over Fagan; the 1997 world champion Doherty, who produced a century break of 102 in the first frame, beat Johnson, and Pinches defeated Taylor in what would turn out to be the last competitive match of the latter's 49-year-long career. "That match against Barry was my last competitive match ever. And what a way to finish here in the Crucible Theatre," said Taylor, referring to the venue in which he had become world champion in 1985. Morgan, who had already won the event in 2011, compiled a century of 112 in a 3‍–‍2 victory over Walker. "I'm really pleased with the way I cued. I have been practicing; the last three weeks I've been going into my club for an hour every morning. In practice I've been playing great," Morgan said afterwards. Wallace also took the first-round match against Judge with an 85 break in the deciding frame. Lilley, competing in his first World Seniors Championship, played Williams and prevailed with a 3‍–‍1 result.

The quarter-finals were played as best-of-7-frame matches on 8 May. In a repeat of one of the 1994 World Championship semi-finals, White faced Morgan, who made a 134, his second century of the event and what would remain as the highest break of the tournament. However, White, despite not managing to compile any breaks of more than 46, won 4‍–‍1. Hendry made a 76 break in the first frame of his match against Figueiredo, who then replied taking three on the trot, featuring a century of 100 and a further break of 61. The fifth frame saw half-centuries by both players, but it was Figueiredo who potted the final black ball and prevailed with a 72‍–‍62 result to advance into the semi-finals. Pinches and Wallace shared the first four frames of their encounter, producing three half-centuries along the way. Although Pinches scored in the next two frames, Wallace won both of them and the match. Lilley had leads of 2‍–‍0 and 3‍–‍1 over Doherty, but the latter—deemed a favourite to win the trophy before the tournament started—managed to take the match to a decider, which Lilley won with a 69 break.

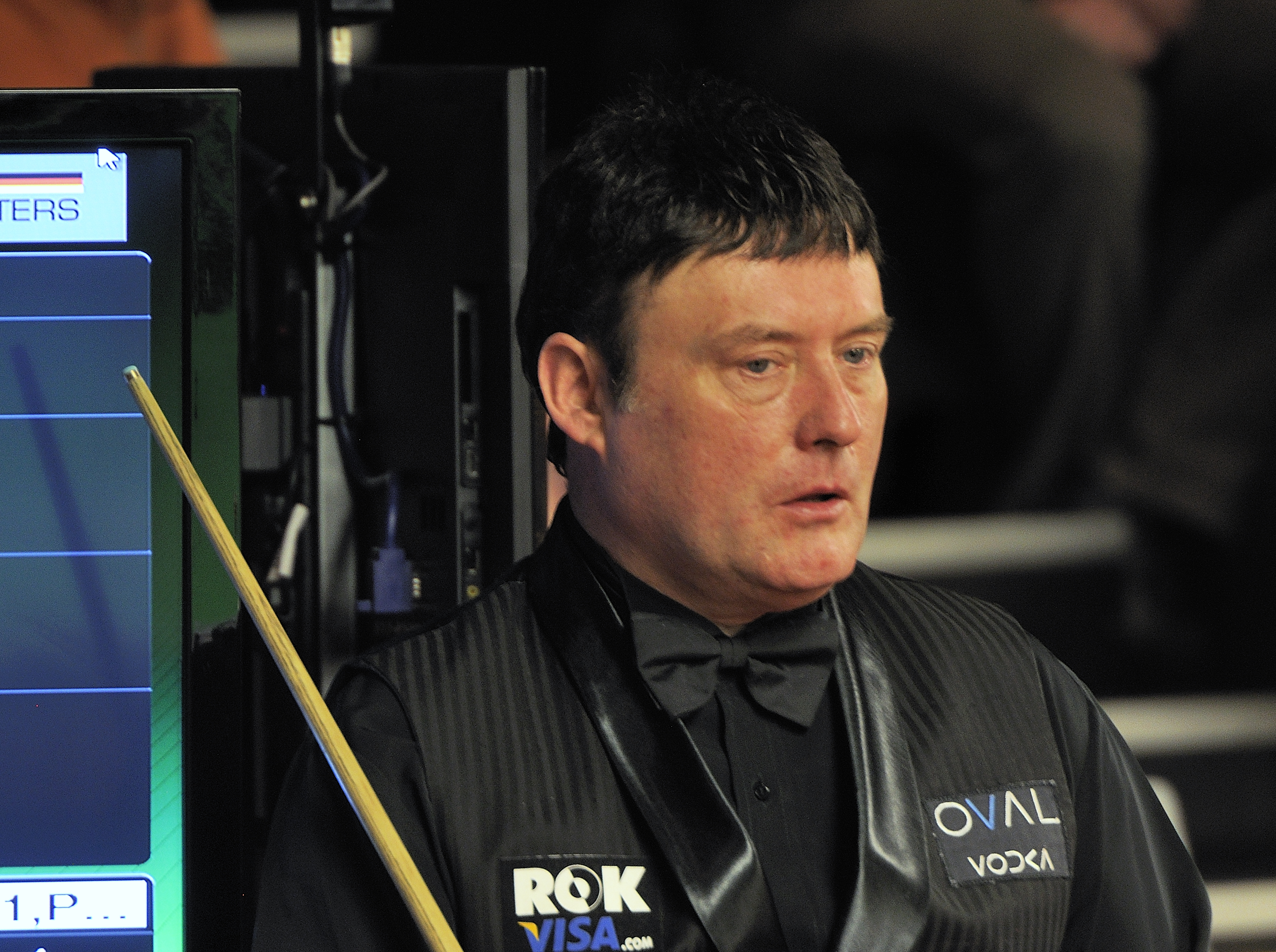
Jimmy White (pictured in 2014), champion both in 2019 and 2020, reached his third consecutive final, but was defeated by David Lilley, who claimed his first title.

The semi-finals were played as best-of-7-frame matches on 9 May. White produced a break of 60 in the first frame of his semi-final against Figueiredo and then doubled his lead. Figueiredo halved the deficit in the third frame, but White took the following two to progress to the final for the third time in a row. In the other match, Wallace secured the first frame but then saw Lilley compile breaks of 65, 56, 89 and 69 to defeat him.

The final, officiated by referee Leo Scullion, was played between White and Lilley on 9 May as the best-of-9 frames. It was a third consecutive final for White, who had won the event both in 2019 and 2020. Lilley took an early lead of 3‍–‍0, but White replied with half-centuries of 85, 63 and 56 to level the match. Lilley won the next two frames, aided by a break of 69 in the final one, to claim his first seniors title. After receiving the trophy, Lilley said, "I'm a bit speechless, I didn't think I'd get this emotional." Victory enabled him to take part in the 2021 Champion of Champions.

== Main draw ==
The results for the main draw are shown below. Numbers given in brackets are the players' seedings. Match winners are denoted in bold.

**Last 16**; Best of 5 frames
**Jimmy White (ENG) (1)**	**3**
Tony Knowles (ENG)	0
Lee Walker (WAL) (8)	2
**Darren Morgan (WAL)**	**3**
**Igor Figueiredo (BRA) (5)**	**3**
John Parrott (ENG)	0
**Stephen Hendry (SCO) (4)**	**3**
Patsy Fagan (IRL)	0
Michael Judge (IRL) (3)	2
**Patrick Wallace (NIR)**	**3**
**Barry Pinches (ENG) (6)**	**3**
Dennis Taylor (NIR)	0
**David Lilley (ENG) (7)**	**3**
Philip Williams (WAL)	1
**Ken Doherty (IRL) (2)**	**3**
Joe Johnson (ENG)	0

**Quarter–finals**; Best of 7 frames
**(England) Jimmy White (1)**	**4**
(Wales) Darren Morgan	1
**(Brazil) Igor Figueiredo (5)**	**4**
(Scotland) Stephen Hendry (4)	1
**(Northern Ireland) Patrick Wallace**	**4**
(England) Barry Pinches (6)	2
**(England) David Lilley (7)**	**4**
(Republic of Ireland) Ken Doherty (2)	3

**Semi–finals**; Best of 7 frames
**(England) Jimmy White (1)**	**4**
(Brazil) Igor Figueiredo (5)	1
(Northern Ireland) Patrick Wallace	1
**(England) David Lilley (7)**	**4**

**Final**; Best of 9 frames
(England) Jimmy White (1)	3
**(England) David Lilley (7)**	**5**

=== Final ===
Final: Best of 9 frames. Referee: Leo Scullion; Crucible Theatre, 9 May 2021
Jimmy White (1); England	3–**5**	**David Lilley (7)**; England
16–**76** (74), 44–**52**, 18–**69**, **85**–0 (85), **113**–7 (63), **110**–32 (56), 49–**63**, 20–**77** (69)
**85**	Highest break	74
0	Century breaks	0
**3**	50+ breaks	2
2021 World Seniors Champion (England) **David Lilley**

== Century breaks ==
There were four century breaks in the main stage of the World Seniors Championship. The highest was a 134 made by Morgan.

- 134, 112 – Darren Morgan
- 102 – Ken Doherty
- 100 – Igor Figueiredo
