= 2019 Seniors Irish Masters =

Seniors Irish Masters
Tournament information
- Dates: 5–6 January 2019
- Venue: Goffs
- City: Kill
- Country: Ireland
- Organisation: World Seniors Snooker
- Format: Seniors event
- Total prize fund: €14,000
- Winner's share: €7,500
- Highest break: (England) Jimmy White (101)

Final
- Champion: (England) Jimmy White
- Runner-up: (Republic of Ireland) Rodney Goggins
- Score: 4–1

The 2019 Seniors Irish Masters was a senior snooker tournament that took place from 5 to 6 January 2019 at Goffs in Kill, County Kildare, Ireland. It was the second event on the 2018/2019 World Seniors Tour.

Patrick Wallace and Rodney Goggins qualified for the event through qualification tournaments in Celbridge and Dublin respectively. They took their places in the tournament alongside 2018 World Seniors Champion Aaron Canavan and five legends of the sport.

Steve Davis won the 2018 event, beating Jonathan Bagley 4–0 in the final, but chose not to defend his title.

Jimmy White won the event with a 4–1 victory in the final against Rodney Goggins.

== Prize fund ==
The breakdown of prize money is shown below:

- Winner: €7,500
- Runner-up: €2,500
- Semi-finals: €1,000
- Highest break: €500
- Total: €14,000

== Main draw ==
Quarter-finals
(Republic of Ireland) Ken Doherty	1
(Republic of Ireland) Rodney Goggins	3
(England) Joe Johnson	3
(Northern Ireland) Dennis Taylor	1
(England) Jimmy White	3
(England) Willie Thorne	0
(Jersey) Aaron Canavan	0
(Northern Ireland) Patrick Wallace	3

Semi-finals
(Republic of Ireland) Rodney Goggins	3
(England) Joe Johnson	0
(England) Jimmy White	3*
(Northern Ireland) Patrick Wallace	2

Final
(Republic of Ireland) Rodney Goggins	1
(England) Jimmy White	4

- All matches played with a 30-second shot clock, with players having two time-outs per match
- *Re-spotted black replaced final frame deciders

== Final ==
Final: Best of 7 frames. Referee: Michaela Tabb. Goffs, Kill, County Kildare, Ireland, 6 January 2019.
Ireland; Rodney Goggins	1–4	England; Jimmy White
59–46 (52), 1–71, 25–83, 3–103 (96), 1–67
52	Highest break	96
0	Century breaks	0
1	50+ breaks	1

== Century breaks ==
Total: 1

- 101 – Jimmy White
