= 2024 World Seniors Championship =

2024 edition of the World Seniors snooker championship

Tournament information
- Dates: 8–12 May 2024
- Venue: Crucible Theatre
- City: Sheffield
- Country: England
- Organisation: World Seniors Tour
- Format: Seniors event
- Highest break: Igor Figueiredo (BRA) (119)

Final
- Champion: Igor Figueiredo (BRA)
- Runner-up: Ken Doherty (IRL)
- Score: 5–2

The 2024 World Seniors Championship (officially the 2024 Mr Vegas World Seniors Championship) was a snooker tournament that took place from 8 to 12 May 2024 at the Crucible Theatre in Sheffield, England, the sixth consecutive year that the tournament was held at the venue. Open to all players over 40 who were ranked outside the top 64 in the snooker world rankings, the event was the 15th edition of the World Seniors Championship, first held in 1991. Organised by the World Seniors Tour, the event was broadcast in the United Kingdom by Channel 5 and internationally by other broadcasters.

Jimmy White was the defending champion, having defeated Alfie Burden 5‍–‍3 in the 2023 final, but he lost 0‍–‍3 to Igor Figueiredo in the quarter-finals. Figueiredo went on to win the title beating Ken Doherty 5‍–‍2 in the final. Figueiredo thus qualified for the 2024 Champion of Champions event. A total of three century breaks were compiled during the event's main stage, the highest being a 119 made by Figueiredo.

== Overview ==
The 2024 World Seniors Championship was a snooker tournament that took place from 8 to 12 May 2024 at the Crucible Theatre in Sheffield, England. The 15th edition of the World Seniors Championship, first played in 1991, it was held at the Crucible for the sixth consecutive year and sponsored for the first time by online casino Mr Vegas. A World Seniors Tour event, the tournament was open to all players over 40 who were ranked outside the top 64 in the snooker world rankings. A 30-second shot clock was in place. The event was broadcast in the United Kingdom on Channel 5 for the first time and by Huya TV for viewers in Asia.

=== Participants ===
The main stage of the event featured sixteen competitors. Jimmy White, who defeated Alfie Burden 5‍–‍3 in the final of the 2023 edition to claim a record-extending fourth title, was the defending champion, but he lost 0‍–‍3 to Igor Figueiredo in the quarter-finals.

Former world champions Ken Doherty, Joe Johnson and Tony Drago were invited to take part in the event. Stephen Hendry was also invited to play, but decided not to enter. Four other players qualified as the winners of regional seniors titles: European seniors champion Darren Morgan, Pan-American seniors champion Figueiredo, African seniors champion Mohamed Khairy, and Asia-Pacific seniors champion Tyson Crinis. Khairy was unable to travel to the event due to visa issues for the second year in a row, and was replaced in the draw by Stuart Watson. Tessa Davidson, topping the female rankings, became the second female player to take part in the final stages of the World Seniors Championship after Maria Catalano in the 2022 event. Tony Knowles, James Wattana and Dechawat Poomjaeng were also invited.

Four qualifying events were held ahead of the tournament. Andrew Norman booked his place for a Crucible debut via the first event, in which he defeated his brother-in-law Ben Hancorn. In the final of the second one, Barry Pinches beat Lee Walker, 2022 champion of the World Seniors. Michael Judge won over Fergal O'Brien in the final of the third, played in Carlow, Ireland. Rodney Goggins whitewashed Nigel Howe in the final of the last one, which took place in Saint Helier.

=== Prize fund ===
The winner of the event received £20,000, which meant an increase of £5,000 from the previous event. There was an additional £2,000 on offer for the highest break of the tournament.

== Summary ==
=== First round ===
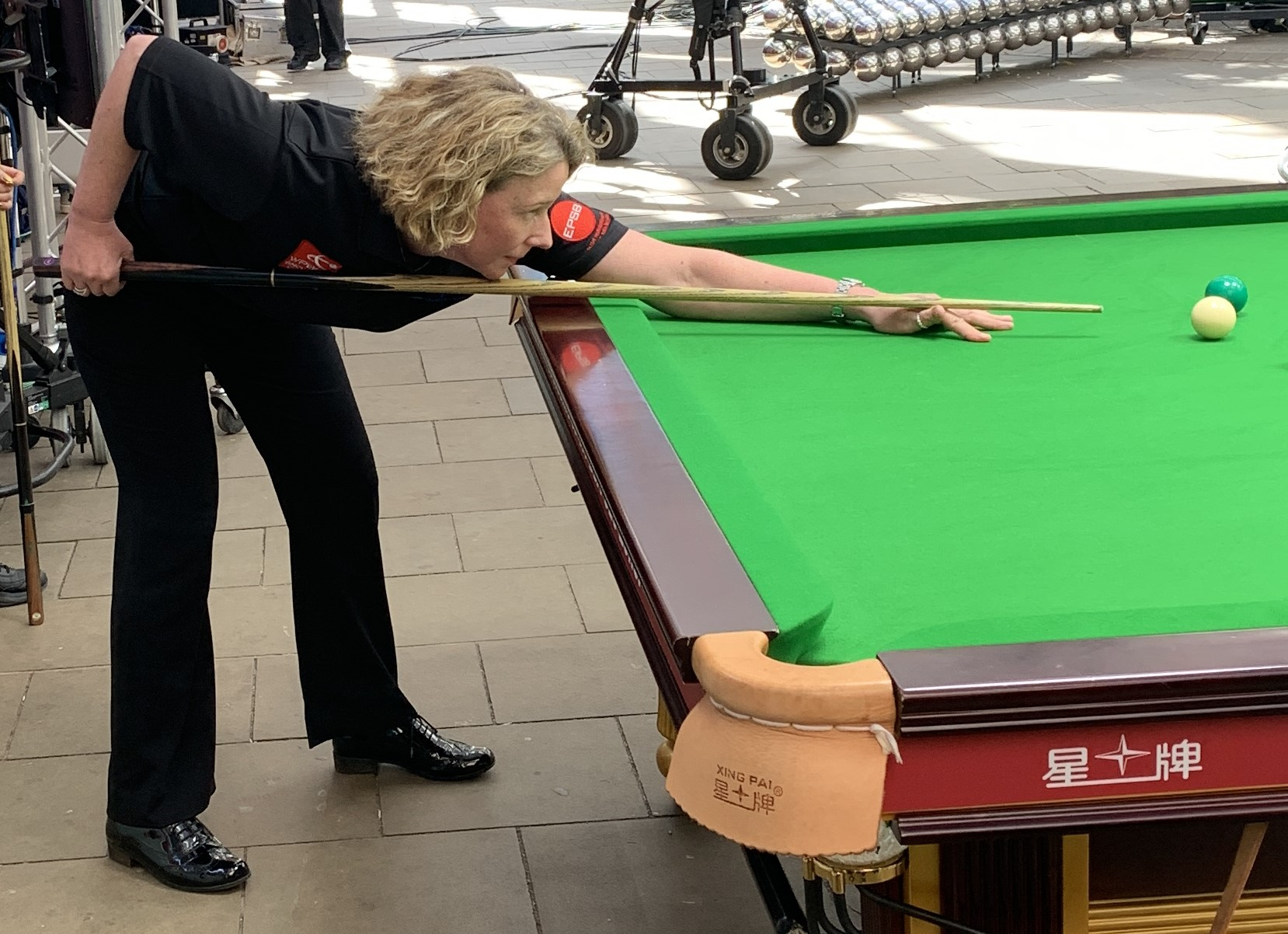
Tessa Davidson, who lost her first round match against Igor Figueiredo with a 1‍–‍3 result, became the first female player to win a frame in the final stages of the World Seniors Championship.

The first round matches were played as the best of five frames on 8 and 9 May. In the opening match, two-time World Championship semi-finalist James Wattana took a 2‍–‍0 lead and then prevented a comeback from Rodney Goggins with a half-century in the deciding frame to advance into the quarter-finals. The 1997 world champion, Ken Doherty, shared the first two frames of his encounter with Tyson Crinis, but then took the third by only one point and made a break of 68 in the fourth to seal victory. Stuart Watson, ranked first in the seniors rankings, whitewashed three-time world semi-finalist Tony Knowles, although Knowles scored points in all three frames. In playing the 2021 semi-finalist Igor Figueiredo, Tessa Davidson became the second woman (after Maria Catalano in 2022) to ever take part in the main stage of the World Seniors Championship. Figueiredo won the opening frame, but Davidson took the second one, also becoming the first female player to win a frame at that stage of the tournament. Figueiredo then secured victory with a 3‍–‍1 result.

On the second day, the 1997 International Open runner-up Tony Drago won 3‍–‍1 over Michael Judge, with Drago scoring the exact same amount of points (73) in every frame he took. In the fourth frame, Judge was on a break, but the blue ball bounced out of the back of the middle pocket after he seemed to have potted it. "Sometimes, I repeat sometimes, you get what you pay for", complained world number one Mark Allen on social media. Andrew Norman took the first two frames of his encounter with defending champion Jimmy White, who then produced a half-century of 54 in the third to halve the deficit and went on to force the decider. Norman made a 52-point break in the deciding frame, but he did not manage to produce a good safety shot and let White in, who completed the comeback for a 3‍–‍2 win. Barry Pinches scored 199 points without reply as he opened up a 2‍–‍0 lead over 1986 world champion Joe Johnson. Johnson won the third frame on the final black ball to halve the deficit, but Pinches won the match 3‍–‍1. The 2011 champion Darren Morgan was defeated 1‍–‍3 by Dechawat Poomjaeng in the last match of the first round.

=== Quarter-finals ===
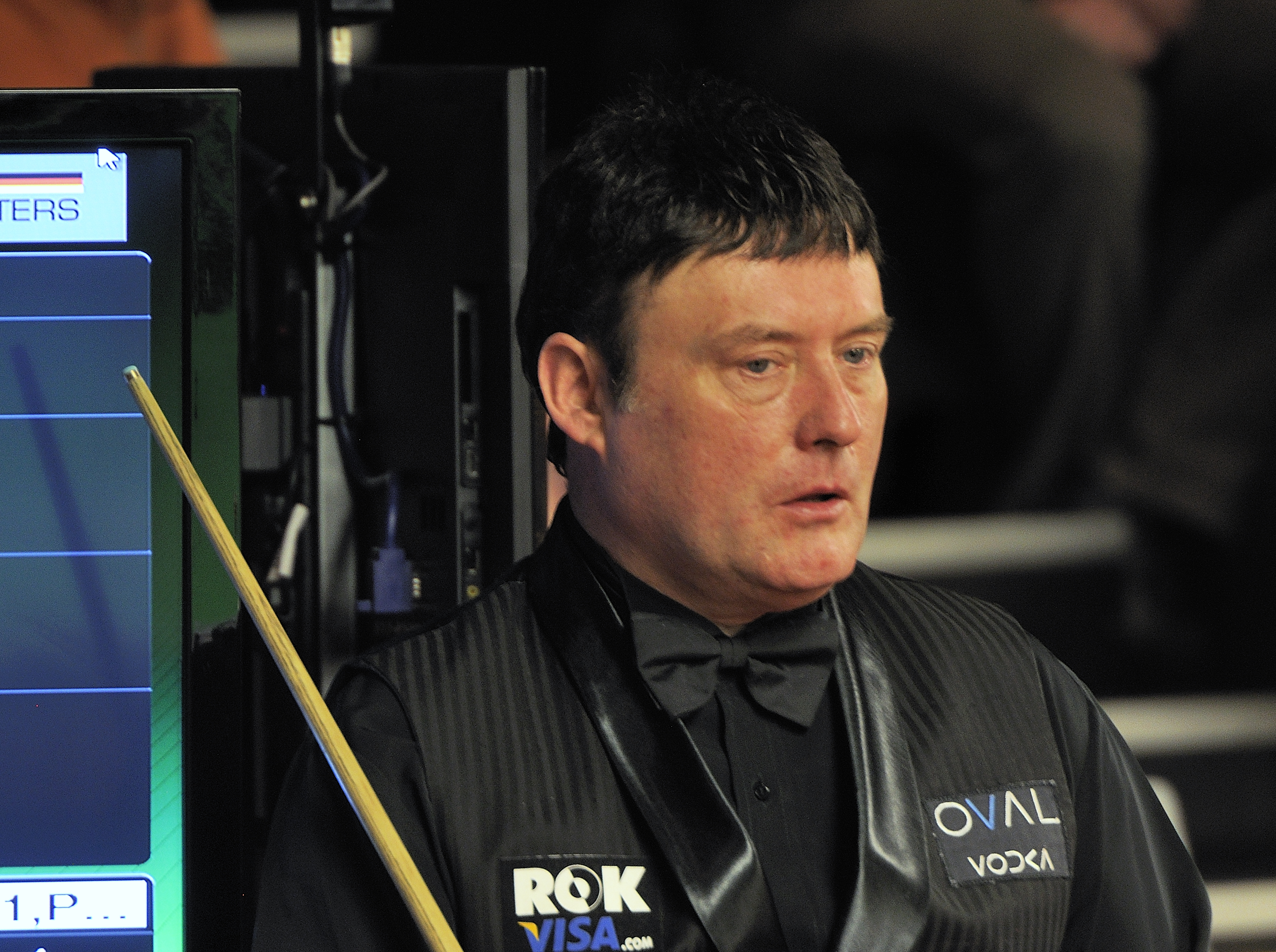
Jimmy White (pictured in 2014) had reached the final of the World Seniors Championship for five years in a row, but he was whitewashed by Igor Figueiredo in the quarter-finals.

The quarter-final matches were played as the best of five frames on 10 May. White, who had reached the final of the championship for the last five years in a row, was whitewashed 0‍–‍3 by Figueiredo. The Brazilian player deemed the victory important "for the Americas". In his match against Doherty, Poomjaeng made a 50-point break in the third frame to go 2‍–‍1 ahead, but Doherty produced breaks of 51 and 70 to turn the scores around. "I'm so relieved to be honest. Dechawat was playing really well and at 2-1 down it was looking a little bit dodgy but I’m delighted to come back and show a bit of character", he said afterwards.

Aided by a break of 91 in the first frame and taking the second on the re-spotted black, Drago put himself 2‍–‍0 ahead of Watson. The following two frames of the match were contested and eventually shared, resulting in a 3‍–‍1 victory for Drago. Pinches also managed to put himself 2‍–‍0 in front of Wattana, taking the first one on the colours and scoring 67 points in both of the first two frames. A missed pot on the pink gave Wattana a chance he took to halve the deficit in the third frame, but Pinches closed the match in the following one.

=== Semi-finals ===
The semi-finals were played as the best of seven frames on 11 May. In his match against Drago, Figueiredo took the first frame, in which both players scored points. Drago responded with a half-century, but Figueiredo made one of his own in the third frame to go one ahead once again. He then compiled back-to-back century breaks in the last two frames for a 4‍–‍1 result. The one which clinched victory for him, a 119, would prove to be the highest break of the tournament. Doherty defeated Pinches with the same result. Doherty raced into a 3‍–‍0 lead and closed out the match in the fifth frame.

=== Final ===
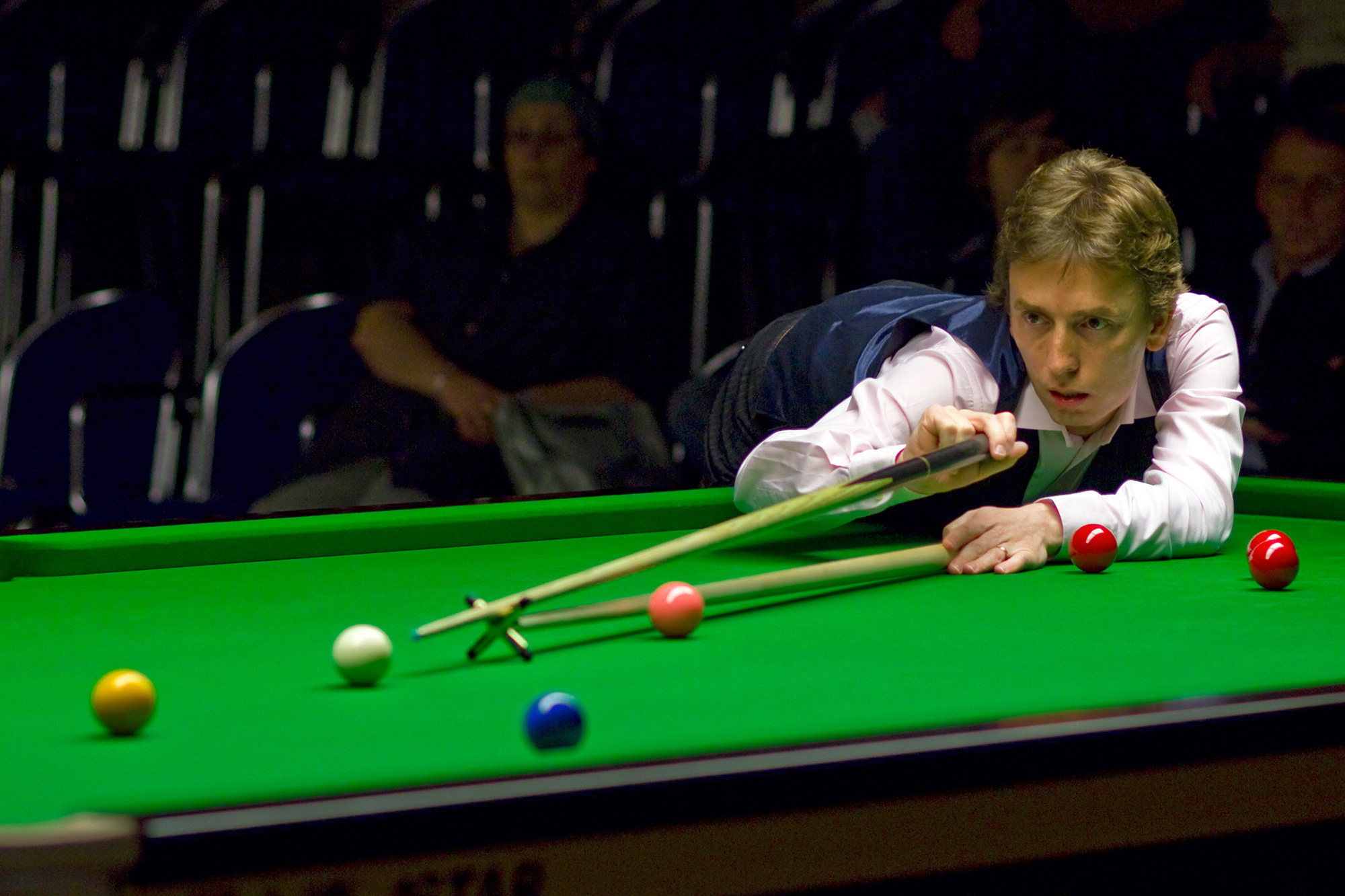
Ken Doherty (pictured in 2011) made a century break in the final, but lost 2‍–‍5 to Igor Figueiredo.

The final, officiated by referee Leo Scullion, was played as the best of nine frames on 12 May between Figueiredo and Doherty. Figueiredo had never reached the final of this tournament before, but Doherty was already a runner-up in the 2020 event, where he saw a 4‍–‍0 lead vanish against White, who then went on to win that match 5‍–‍4. Figueiredo and Doherty had met each other twice before, with Doherty winning on both occasions: 4‍–‍2 at the 2010 Rhein‍–‍Main Masters and 4‍–‍1 in the final of the 2018 UK Seniors Championship. Doherty took the opening frame with a century break, his first of the event and the third overall. Figueiredo then replied with a break of 72 in the second frame to restore the balance and went on to win three more on the spin to put himself ahead and only one away from victory.

Doherty fired back with breaks of 50 and 56 to edge one closer at 2‍–‍4, but Figueiredo cleared the table with a break of 88 of his own in the seventh frame to seal victory with a 5‍–‍2 result. He took £20,000 for the win and an additional £5,000 for compiling the highest break of the tournament. In winning, Figueiredo also earned a place to play at the 2024 Champion of Champions. "I came in very confident but also nervous because it was a very important moment, not only for myself and my history but for the Americas – it is very important for current players and for the future generation", said Figueiredo after the match.

== Main draw ==
The results for the main draw are shown below. Numbers in parentheses after the players' names are their seedings for the two seeded players, and their World Seniors Tour rankings (in italics) for the unseeded players. Match winners are shown in bold.

**First round** Best of 5 frames
**Jimmy White (ENG) (1)**	**3**
Andrew Norman (ENG) (18)	2
**Igor Figueiredo (BRA)**	**3**
Tessa Davidson (ENG)	1
Tony Knowles (ENG)	0
**Stuart Watson (ENG) (1)**	**3**
**Tony Drago (MLT)**	**3**
Michael Judge (IRL) (17)	1
Joe Johnson (ENG)	1
**Barry Pinches (ENG) (22)**	**3**
**James Wattana (THA)**	**3**
Rodney Goggins (IRL) (2)	2
Darren Morgan (WAL) (73)	1
**Dechawat Poomjaeng (THA)**	**3**
**Ken Doherty (IRL) (2)**	**3**
Tyson Crinis (AUS)	1

**Quarter–finals**; Best of 5 frames
(England) Jimmy White (1)	0
**(Brazil) Igor Figueiredo**	**3**
(England) Stuart Watson (1)	1
**(Malta) Tony Drago**	**3**
**(England) Barry Pinches (22)**	**3**
(Thailand) James Wattana	1
(Thailand) Dechawat Poomjaeng	2
**(Republic of Ireland) Ken Doherty (2)**	**3**

**Semi–finals**; Best of 7 frames
**(Brazil) Igor Figueiredo**	**4**
(Malta) Tony Drago	1
(England) Barry Pinches (22)	1
**(Republic of Ireland) Ken Doherty (2)**	**4**

**Final**; Best of 9 frames
**(Brazil) Igor Figueiredo**	**5**
(Republic of Ireland) Ken Doherty (2)	2

=== Final ===
Final: Best of 9 frames. Referee: Leo Scullion; Crucible Theatre, 12 May 2024
**Igor Figueiredo**; Brazil	**5**–2	Ken Doherty (2); Ireland
Frame scores: 1–**109** (100), **77**–14, **89**–26, **93**–0, **74**–44, 33–**110**, **117**–0
93	Highest break	**100**
0	Century breaks	**1**
2024 World Seniors Champion (Brazil) **Igor Figueiredo**

== Century breaks ==
There were three century breaks in the main stage of the World Seniors Championship. The highest was a 119 made by Figueiredo.

- 119, 110 – Igor Figueiredo
- 100 – Ken Doherty
