= 2018 Seniors Masters =

The Seniors Masters
Tournament information
- Dates: 12 April 2018
- Venue: Crucible Theatre
- City: Sheffield
- Country: England
- Organisation: Snooker Legends
- Format: Seniors event
- Total prize fund: £14,500
- Winner's share: £7,500
- Highest break: (England) John Parrott (85)

Final
- Champion: (Canada) Cliff Thorburn
- Runner-up: (England) Jonathan Bagley
- Score: 2–1

The 2018 Seniors Masters was a senior snooker tournament which took place on 12 April 2018 at the Crucible Theatre in Sheffield, England. It was the fourth and final event on the newly created World Seniors Tour.

Cliff Thorburn won the title beating Jonathan Bagley 2–1 on a re-spotted black ball which replaced the final frame decider in the final. Thorburn, at the age of 70, became the oldest winner of a World Seniors title; the previous record belonged to Steve Davis, who was 60 when he won the 2018 Seniors Irish Masters.

== Prize fund ==
The breakdown of prize money is shown below:

- Winner: £7,500
- Runner-up: £2,500
- Semi-finals: £1,000
- Quarter-finals: £500
- Highest break: £500
- Total: £14,500

== Main Draw ==
Quarter-finals; Best of 3 frames
(Scotland) Stephen Hendry (1)	1
(Republic of Ireland) Michael Judge	2*
(Northern Ireland) Dennis Taylor (4)	0
(England) Jonathan Bagley	2
(England) John Parrott (2)	2
(England) Tony Knowles	0
(Canada) Cliff Thorburn (5)	w/o
(England) Joe Johnson (3)	w/d

Semi-finals; Best of 3 frames
(Republic of Ireland) Michael Judge	1
(England) Jonathan Bagley	2*
(England) John Parrott (2)	0
(Canada) Cliff Thorburn (5)	2

Final; Best of 3 frames
(England) Jonathan Bagley	1
(Canada) Cliff Thorburn (5)	2*

- All matches were played with a 30-second shot clock with players having two time-outs per match
- *Re-spotted black ball replaced final frame deciders to determine the winner.

== Final ==
Final: Best of 3 frames. Referee: Michaela Tabb. Crucible Theatre, Sheffield, England, 12 April 2018.
Johnathan Bagley; England	1–2	Cliff Thorburn; Canada
72–6, 21–57, 0–7*(respotted black)
36	Highest break	47
0	Century breaks	0
0	50+ breaks	0
