= 2023 World Seniors Championship =

2023 edition of the World Seniors snooker championship

Tournament information
- Dates: 3–7 May 2023
- Venue: Crucible Theatre
- City: Sheffield
- Country: England
- Organisation: World Seniors Tour
- Format: Seniors event
- Highest break: Mark Davis (ENG) (137)

Final
- Champion: Jimmy White (ENG)
- Runner-up: Alfie Burden (ENG)
- Score: 5–3

The 2023 World Seniors Championship (officially the 2023 LLP Solicitors World Seniors Snooker Championship) was a snooker tournament that took place from 3 to 7 May 2023 at the Crucible Theatre in Sheffield, England, the fifth consecutive year that the tournament was held at the venue. Open to all players over 40 who were ranked outside the top 64 in the snooker world rankings, the event was the 14th edition of the World Seniors Championship, first held in 1991. Organised by the World Seniors Tour, the event was broadcast domestically by the BBC and internationally by other broadcasters.

The main stage of the event featured 16 competitors. Former world champions Ken Doherty, Stephen Hendry, and Joe Johnson were among seven invited players. The holders of four regional seniors titles qualified for the main stage, along with four players who won qualifying events staged throughout the 2022–23 snooker season at the Crucible Sports and Social Club in Reading. The final participant was selected via a Golden Ticket playoff event. Unable to attend the event due to visa issues, African seniors champion Mohamed Khairy was replaced in the draw by Tony Knowles.

Lee Walker was the defending champion, having defeated Jimmy White 5–4 in the 2022 final, but he lost 1–3 to Gerard Greene in the last 16. White, aged 61, reached the final of the event for the sixth time—and a fifth consecutive year—where he defeated tournament debutant Alfie Burden 5–3 to win a record-extending fourth World Seniors title, following his previous wins in 2010, 2019, and 2020. Mark Davis made the tournament's highest break of 137 in his quarter-final match against Tony Drago.

== Overview ==
The 2023 World Seniors Championship was a snooker tournament that took place from 3 to 7 May 2023 at the Crucible Theatre in Sheffield, England. The 14th edition of the World Seniors Championship, first held in 1991, it was held at the Crucible for the fifth consecutive year and sponsored for the first time by law firm LLP Solicitors. A World Seniors Tour event, the tournament was open to all players over 40 who were ranked outside the top 64 in the snooker world rankings. The event was broadcast domestically on the BBC Red Button and BBC iPlayer, in China by Superstar Online, and in all other territories by Matchroom Sport. Referees at the tournament were Peggy Li, Leo Scullion, and Michaela Tabb.

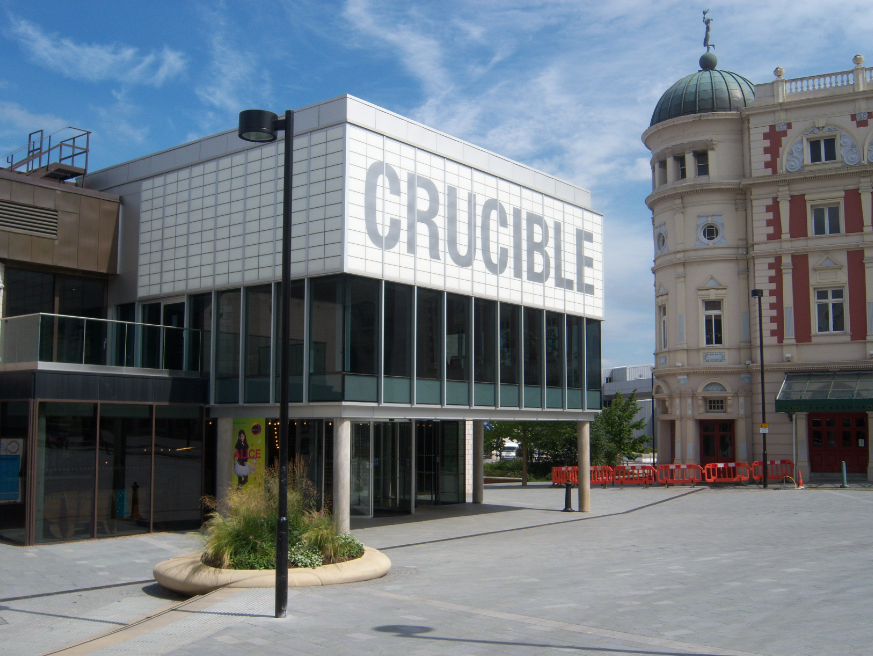
The main stage of the event was held at the Crucible Theatre in Sheffield for a fifth consecutive year.

=== Participants ===
The main stage of the event featured 16 competitors. Seven players were invited to the event: Mark Davis, Ken Doherty, Tony Drago, Stephen Hendry, Joe Johnson, Lee Walker, and Jimmy White. Four other players qualified as the winners of regional seniors titles: European seniors champion Darren Morgan, Pan-American seniors champion Vito Puopolo, African seniors champion Mohamed Khairy, and Asia-Pacific seniors champion Adrian Ridley. A further four players reached the main draw by winning qualifying events during the season at the Crucible Sports and Social Club in Reading, held respectively from 28 to 30 October 2022, 13 to 15 January 2023, 17 to 19 February 2023, and 10 to 12 March 2023. Ben Hancorn won the first event, beating Alfie Burden 4–2 in the final, and Gerard Greene won the second, defeating Philip Williams in the final by the same score. Burden won the third event, defeating Peter Lines 4–3 in the final, and Lines won the fourth event, beating Andrew Norman 4–2 in the final. The last participant was selected through a "Golden Ticket Tournament" event held on 22 and 23 April 2023 among 16 players ranked highly in the world seniors rankings. Williams won the Golden Ticket Tournament, defeating Craig Steadman 4–1 in the final. The seven invited players were seeded for the tournament, with Walker seeded number one as the defending champion, having defeated White 5–4 in the 2022 final. Of the remaining participants, Lines was ranked highest in the snooker world rankings and was seeded eighth. Unable to travel due to visa issues, Khairy withdrew from the event and was replaced in the draw by Tony Knowles.

=== Prize fund ===
The winner of the event received £15,000. The breakdown of prize money is shown below:

- Winner: £15,000
- Runner-up: £7,000
- Semi-finalists: £3,000
- Quarter-finalists: £2,000
- First round: No prize money.

== Summary ==
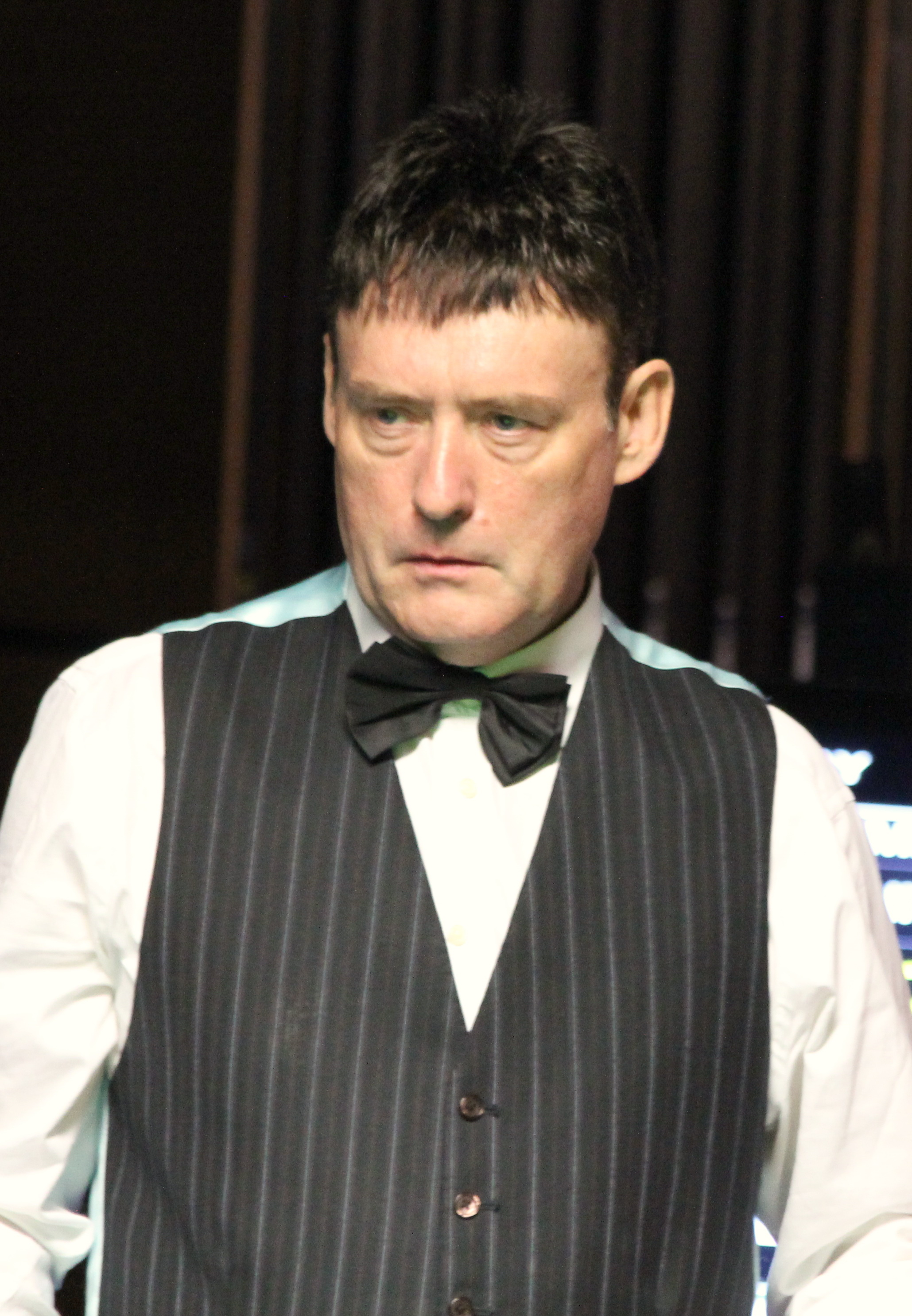
Jimmy White (pictured in 2016) played in his sixth World Seniors Championship final and won the title for a record-extending fourth time.

Last-16 matches were played as the best of five frames from 3 to 5 May. Defending champion Walker won the first frame against Greene with a 52 break, but Greene won three consecutive frames to defeat Walker 3–1. Davis whitewashed three-time World Snooker Championship semi-finalist Knowles 3–0. Burden whitewashed the 1997 world champion Doherty, making a highest break of 60. Drago whitewashed Puopolo, making a highest break of 73 and recording an average shot time of 13 seconds and a pot success rate of 95 percent. Seven-time world champion Hendry faced the 2011 world seniors champion Morgan. The first two frames were shared. Requiring a snooker in the third frame, Hendry secured the foul points he needed after snookering Morgan on the final pink, and then potted pink and black to win the frame. Morgan tied the scores at 2–2, but Hendry won the deciding frame with a 79 break. White won three consecutive frames against Williams, making a 70 break in frame four to complete a 3–1 victory. Australian player Ridley whitewashed the 1986 world champion Johnson. Hancorn defeated Lines in a deciding frame.

Quarter-final matches were played as the best of seven frames on 6 May. White made breaks of 76, 102, 80, and 84 as he whitewashed Ridley. Drago took a 3–0 lead over Davis, but Davis responded with a total clearance of 137 in frame four, the highest break of the tournament, and then won the next two frames with breaks of 63 and 98 to tie the scores at 3–3 and force a deciding frame. However, Drago clinched the decider on the colours for a 4–3 victory. In his post-match interview, a tearful Drago revealed that he had learned of a close friend's death that day, and said "I just wanted to win so much for him". Burden took the first frame against Hendry, who tied the scores at 1–1 with a 62 break. However, Burden then won three consecutive frames, ending with an 85 break in frame five, as he defeated Hendry 4–1. Facing Greene, Hancorn made breaks of 98 and 116 while his opponent made two breaks of 73. Hancorn won the match 4–3 after making a 49 break in the deciding frame.

The semi-finals and final were played as the best of seven and nine frames respectively on 7 May. Facing Drago in the first semi-final, White won the first two frames before Drago took the third with a 72 break. White made breaks of 74, 56, and 68 to win 4–1 and reach his sixth World Seniors final, his fifth consecutively. In the other semi-final, Burden made breaks of 86, 72, 56, and 101 as he defeated Hancorn 4–1. In the final, White made breaks of 62, 63, and 55 as he took a 4–1 lead. However, Burden won frame six. In the seventh, he snookered White behind the black after potting the last red, and gained enough foul points from failed escape attempts to leave White requiring a snooker; he won the frame to reduce White's lead to 4–3. However, White made an 84 break in frame eight to win the match 5–3 and clinch a record-extending fourth World Seniors title at age 61. He commented that he had not played at his best, but said "I still have the motivation and sometimes you have to do what Mark Selby does and win when playing badly. I’m delighted."

== Main draw ==
The results for the main draw are shown below. Numbers given to the left of players' names are their seedings. Match winners are denoted in bold.

**Last 16**; Best of 5 frames
1	Lee Walker (WAL)	1
**Gerard Greene** (NIR)	**3**
8	Peter Lines (ENG)	2
**Ben Hancorn** (ENG)	**3**
5	**Stephen Hendry** (SCO)	**3**
Darren Morgan (WAL)	2
4	Ken Doherty (IRL)	0
**Alfie Burden** (ENG)	**3**
3	**Jimmy White** (ENG)	**3**
Philip Williams (WAL)	1
6	Joe Johnson (ENG)	0
**Adrian Ridley** (AUS)	**3**
7	**Tony Drago** (MLT)	**3**
Vito Puopolo (CAN)	0
2	**Mark Davis** (ENG)	**3**
Tony Knowles (ENG)	0

**Quarter–finals**; Best of 7 frames
(Northern Ireland) Gerard Greene	3
(England) **Ben Hancorn**	**4**
5	(Scotland) Stephen Hendry	1
(England) **Alfie Burden**	**4**
3	(England) **Jimmy White**	**4**
(Australia) Adrian Ridley	0
7	(Malta) **Tony Drago**	**4**
2	(England) Mark Davis	3

**Semi–finals**; Best of 7 frames
(England) Ben Hancorn	1
(England) **Alfie Burden**	**4**
3	(England) **Jimmy White**	**4**
7	(Malta) Tony Drago	1

**Final**; Best of 9 frames
(England) Alfie Burden	3
3	(England) **Jimmy White**	**5**

=== Final ===
Final: Best of 9 frames. Referee: Michaela Tabb; Crucible Theatre, 7 May 2023
Alfie Burden; England	3–**5**	**Jimmy White**; England
Frame scores: 53–**69** (53, **62**), **74**–24, 33–**62**, 23–**77** (**63**), 19–**70** (**55**), **71**–29, **69**–29, 1–**115** (**84**)
53	Highest break	**84**
0	Century breaks	0
1	50+ breaks	**4**
2023 World Seniors Champion (England) Jimmy White

== Century breaks ==
There were four century breaks made during the tournament.

- 137 – Mark Davis
- 116 – Ben Hancorn
- 103 – Jimmy White
- 101 – Alfie Burden
