= 2020 World Seniors Championship =

2020 edition of the World Seniors snooker championship

Tournament information
- Dates: 19–22 August 2020
- Venue: Crucible Theatre
- City: Sheffield
- Country: England
- Organisation: World Seniors Snooker
- Format: Seniors event
- Winner's share: £15,000
- Highest break: Jimmy White (ENG) (130)

Final
- Champion: Jimmy White (ENG)
- Runner-up: Ken Doherty (IRL)
- Score: 5–4

The 2020 World Seniors Championship was a snooker tournament that took place from 19 to 22 August 2020 at the Crucible Theatre in Sheffield, England. The last event of the 2019–20 World Seniors Tour, it was the 11th edition of the World Seniors Championship, first held in 1991. The event was played behind closed doors due to the COVID-19 pandemic and was broadcast by the BBC. The event featured sixteen players in a single-elimination tournament.

Jimmy White was the defending champion, having won the 2019 event with a 5–3 victory against Darren Morgan in the final. White successfully defended his title, coming from 0–4 down to beat Ken Doherty 5–4 in the final. In winning the event, White qualified for the 2020 Champion of Champions tournament. White also made the only century break of the event, a 130 in his semi-final win.

== Overview ==
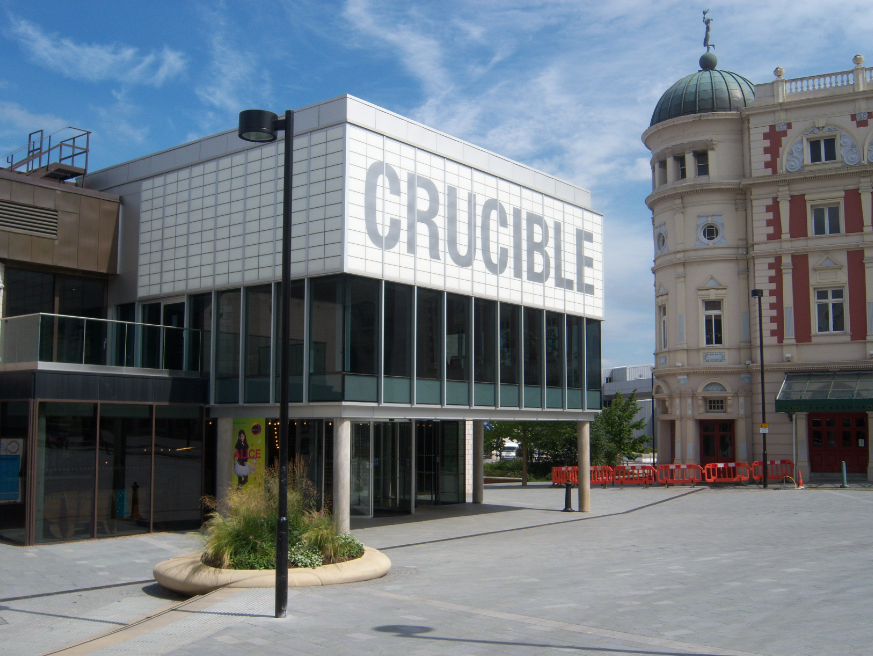
The event was held at the Crucible Theatre in Sheffield, England.

The World Seniors Championship is a snooker tournament that first took place in 1991. The event is open to players over 40 who are not in the top 64 of the world rankings. The 2020 event took place from 19 to 22 August 2020 at the Crucible Theatre in Sheffield, England – the location of the World Snooker Championship. It was the last event of the 2019–20 World Seniors Tour, it was the 11th edition of the World Seniors Championship. The event was played behind closed doors due to the COVID-19 pandemic.

The event featured 16 participants, with matches being contested as the best-of-seven frames, until the final, which was a best-of-nine. The winner of the event secured a place in the professional 2020 Champion of Champions event, and won £15,000. The field was made up of eight selected ranking event winners, and four previous winners of the event. The event was broadcast by the BBC. Jimmy White was the defending champion, having won the 2019 event with a 5–3 victory against Darren Morgan in the final. Four players in the event were seeded, in different quarters of the draw. All players were tested for COVID-19 before the event. If a player was found to be positive, Ronnie O'Sullivan, the winner of the 2020 World Snooker Championship would have been the first replacement.

== Summary ==
The first round of the event was played on 19 and 20 August 2020, refereed by Michaela Tabb. Jimmy White, Ken Doherty, Darren Morgan and Aaron Canavan all won matches on the first day. White, defending the championship, defeated 1986 World Snooker Championship winner Joe Johnson 4–1, making breaks of 90, 71 and 70. In an all-Irish match, Doherty defeated Rodney Goggins on a deciding frame. Morgan recovered from behind, making breaks of 73, 75, 75 and a 70 to win 4–2 against Patrick Wallace. The 2018 winner Canavan defeated Leo Fernandez in a match that finished past midnight, winning 4–3. The second day featured wins by Michael Judge over Dennis Taylor 4–1, Peter Lines completing a 4–0 whitewash over Tony Knowles, and Wayne Cooper defeating Gary Flitness 4–2. The remaining match was Stephen Hendry defeating Nigel Bond on a deciding frame 4–3.

The quarter-finals were played on 21 August. Canavan won the opening frame, however his opponent Hendry won the remaining four frames to win 4–1. Hendry finished the match with a pot success of 95%. Judge defeated Cooper 4–1, commenting that he felt like he had put too much pressure on himself to win. White made three breaks over 60 as he won his match 4–1 over Lines, whilst Doherty defeated Morgan 4–2. The semi-finals and final were both played on 22 August. The first semi-final was between White and Hendry who had previously met in four World Snooker Championship finals. White won the opening frame, before a 64 break from Hendry evened the score at 1–1. White won the next two frames, including the highest break of the tournament, a 130. Hendry won frame five, but White won the match with a break of 55 in frame six. Doherty won the opening frame in his match against Judge, but the match was tied after a break of 49. However, Doherty made a break of above 50 in the next three frames to win the match 4–1.

The final, officiated by Tabb, was played between White and Doherty on 22 August as the best-of-9 frames. Doherty made breaks of 93, 46, 44 and 56 to take a 4–0 lead into the mid-session interval, and be one frame away from winning the tournament. White, however, won the next two frames with breaks of 42 and 44, and won the seventh frame on the black ball. Doherty made a break of only 32 in the next frame, allowing White to make a break of 76 to take the match to a deciding frame. White won the frame and tournament with a break of 76. Doherty commented that the loss was "heartbreaking", and later commented on Twitter that it would take him some time to recover. This was the third time that White had won the event, having previously lifted the title in 2010 and 2019. In winning the final, White won a place in the Champion of Champions, and £15,000. The final frame was ultimately not broadcast on the BBC Red Button, as it was replaced by golf highlights.

== Main draw ==
Players in bold denote match winners, whilst numbers to the left are players seedings.

Last 16; Best of 7 frames
1 | **Jimmy White** (ENG) | **4**
Joe Johnson (ENG) | 1
Tony Knowles (ENG) | 0
**Peter Lines** (ENG) | **4**
**Aaron Canavan** (JER) | **4**
Leo Fernandez (IRL) | 3
4 | **Stephen Hendry** (SCO) | **4**
Nigel Bond (ENG) | 3
3 | **Ken Doherty** (IRL) | **4**
Rodney Goggins (IRL) | 3
Patrick Wallace (NIR) | 2
**Darren Morgan** (WAL) | **4**
**Wayne Cooper** (ENG) | **4**
Gary Filtness (ENG) | 2
2 | **Michael Judge** (IRL) | **4**
Dennis Taylor (NIR) | 1

Quarter–finals; Best of 7 frames
1 | (England) **Jimmy White** | **4**
(England) Peter Lines | 1
(Jersey) Aaron Canavan | 1
4 | (Scotland) **Stephen Hendry** | **4**
3 | (Republic of Ireland) **Ken Doherty** | **4**
(Wales) Darren Morgan | 2
(England) Wayne Cooper | 1
2 | (Republic of Ireland) **Michael Judge** | **4**

Semi–finals; Best of 7 frames
1 | (England) **Jimmy White** | **4**
4 | (Scotland) Stephen Hendry | 2
3 | (Republic of Ireland) **Ken Doherty** | **4**
2 | (Republic of Ireland) Michael Judge | 1

Final; Best of 9 frames
1 | (England) **Jimmy White** | **5**
3 | (Republic of Ireland) Ken Doherty | 4

=== Final ===
Final: Best of 9 frames. Referee: Michaela Tabb; Crucible Theatre, 22 August 2020
| **Jimmy White** (1); England | **5**–4 | Ken Doherty (3); Ireland |
12–**88**, 2–**107** (93), 16–**63**, 1–**117** (56), **67**–17, **71**–14, **71**–60, **79**–37 (79), **108**–2 (85)
| 85 | Highest break | **93** |
| 0 | Century breaks | 0 |
| 2 | 50+ breaks | 2 |

== Century breaks ==
Jimmy White made the only century break during the event, a 130 at the semi-final stage.
