= 2018 Seniors Irish Masters =

Seniors Irish Masters
Tournament information
- Dates: 6–7 January 2018
- Venue: Goffs
- City: Kill
- Country: Ireland
- Organisation: Snooker Legends
- Format: Seniors event

Final
- Champion: (England) Steve Davis
- Runner-up: (England) Jonathan Bagley
- Score: 4–0

The 2018 Seniors Irish Masters was a senior snooker tournament which took place at Goffs in Kill, County Kildare, Ireland, from 6 to 7 January 2018. It was the second event on the newly created World Seniors Tour. The tournament was won by Steve Davis.

== Prize fund ==
The breakdown of prize money is shown below:

- Winner: £5,000
- Runner-up: £2,000
- Semi-finals: £800
- Quarter-finals: £400
- Highest break: £500
- Total: £10,700

== Main draw ==
Quarter-finals; Best of 5 frames
(England) Jimmy White	3
(Northern Ireland) Patrick Wallace	0
(Republic of Ireland) Ken Doherty	2
(England) Jonathan Bagley	3*
(England) John Parrott	3
(Republic of Ireland) Patsy Fagan	0
(Northern Ireland) Dennis Taylor	1
(England) Steve Davis	3

Semi-finals; Best of 5 frames
(England) Jimmy White	2
(England) Jonathan Bagley	3*
(England) John Parrott	0
(England) Steve Davis	3

Final; Best of 7 frames
(England) Jonathan Bagley	0
(England) Steve Davis	4

* A re-spotted black ball shootout replaced final frame deciders at 2–2.

== Final ==
Final: Best of 7 frames. Referee: Jan Verhaas. Goffs, Kill, County Kildare, Ireland, 7 January 2018.
Jonathan Bagley; England	0–4	Steve Davis; England
44–57, 25–73 (56), 59–68, 6–61
32	Highest break	56
0	Century breaks	0
0	50+ breaks	1

== Notes ==
- Patrick Wallace replaced Julian Logue who withdrew from the tournament.
