= 2017 World Seniors Championship =

Tournament information
- Dates: 22–24 March 2017
- Venue: Baths Hall
- City: Scunthorpe
- Country: England
- Organisation: Snooker Legends
- Format: Seniors event
- Total prize fund: £18,500
- Winner's share: £10,000
- Highest break: (England) Peter Lines (69)

Final
- Champion: (England) Peter Lines
- Runner-up: (England) John Parrott
- Score: 4–0

The 2017 World Seniors Championship was a snooker tournament, that took place at the Baths Hall in Scunthorpe, England, from 22 to 24 March 2017. Qualifying for the tournament was open to non-tour players, who were aged 40 and over on 1 January 2017. The champion received a place in the qualifying tournament for the 2017 World Snooker Championship in Sheffield.

Mark Davis was the champion of the previous event. However he was not eligible for this year's edition, as it was exclusively for non-tour players. Snooker Legends organised the event for the first time having replaced the WPBSA who previously sanctioned the event. Peter Lines won the tournament without losing a single frame. He beat John Parrott 4–0 in the final.

== Prize fund ==
The breakdown of the tournament prizes is shown below:

- Winner: £10,000 and a place in WC qualifying
- Runner-up: £3,000
- Semi-finalist: £1,500
- Quarter-finalist: £500
- Highest break: £500
- Total: £18,500

== Field ==
=== Seeded players ===
Players were seeded based on the titles won during their professional careers:

1. (Scotland) Stephen Hendry – 7 world titles (1990, 1992–96, 1999), 18 triple crown events
2. (Canada) Cliff Thorburn – 1 world title (1980), 4 triple crown events
3. (England) John Parrott – 1 world title (1991), 2 triple crown events, 9 ranking events
4. (Northern Ireland) Dennis Taylor – 1 world title (1985), 2 triple crown events, 2 ranking events
5. (England) Joe Johnson – 1 world title (1986), 1 triple crown event
6. (Republic of Ireland) Patsy Fagan – 1 triple crown event
7. (England) Tony Knowles – 2 ranking events
8. (England) Willie Thorne – 1 ranking event

Steve Davis, Ray Reardon, Terry Griffiths, Tony Meo and Doug Mountjoy were invited to take part, but declined.

=== Qualifying ===
Four qualifying events took place during February and March 2017:

- 17–19 February: The Crucible Sports and Social Club, Newbury, England (Qualifying Event 1)
  - Qualifier: (England) Peter Lines
- 23–25 February: The Northern Snooker Centre, Leeds, England (Qualifying Event 2)
  - Qualifier: (England) Jonathan Bagley
- 3–5 March: Ballroom Nürnberg, Nuremberg, Germany (Qualifying Event 3)
  - Qualifier: (England) Aiden Owens
- 10–12 March – D’Arcy McGees at Spawell, Dublin, Ireland (Qualifying Event 4)
  - Qualifier: (Northern Ireland) Patrick Wallace

Each qualifier took their place alongside the eight invited players in the main draw of the championship.

== Main draw ==
Round 1 Best of 5 frames
(England) Willie Thorne (8)	1
(England) Aiden Owens	3
(Republic of Ireland) Patsy Fagan (6)	0
(England) Peter Lines	3
(England) Joe Johnson (5)	3
(Northern Ireland) Patrick Wallace	0
(England) Tony Knowles (7)	2
(England) Jonathan Bagley	3*

Quarter-finals; Best of 5 frames
(Scotland) Stephen Hendry (1)	3*
(England) Aiden Owens	2
(Northern Ireland) Dennis Taylor (4)	0
(England) Peter Lines	3
(England) John Parrott (3)	3
(England) Joe Johnson (5)	0
(Canada) Cliff Thorburn (2)	0
(England) Jonathan Bagley	3

Semi-finals; Best of 5 frames
(Scotland) Stephen Hendry (1)	0
(England) Peter Lines	3
(England) John Parrott (3)	3*
(England) Jonathan Bagley	2

Final; Best of 7 frames
(England) Peter Lines	4
(England) John Parrott (3)	0

- All matches were played with a 30-second shot clock with players having two time-outs per match
- ^{*}Re-spotted black ball replaced final frame deciders

== Final ==
Final: Best of 7 frames. Referee: Michaela Tabb. Baths Hall, Scunthorpe, 24 March 2017.
Peter Lines; England	4–0	John Parrott (3); England
41	Highest break	23
0	Century breaks	0
0	50+ breaks	0

== 50+ breaks ==
- 69 (England) Peter Lines
- 55 (England) Aiden Owens
