= 2019 World Seniors Championship =

Tournament information
- Dates: 15–18 August 2019
- Venue: Crucible Theatre
- City: Sheffield
- Country: England
- Organisation: World Seniors Snooker
- Format: Seniors event
- Total prize fund: £63,500
- Winner's share: £25,000
- Highest break: (Thailand) James Wattana (113)

Final
- Champion: (England) Jimmy White
- Runner-up: (Wales) Darren Morgan
- Score: 5–3

The 2019 World Seniors Championship was a snooker tournament, that took place from 15 to 18 August 2019 at the Crucible Theatre in Sheffield, England. It was the first event of the 2019–20 World Seniors Tour. It was the tenth World Seniors Championship, first held in 1991. The event had a total prize fund of £63,500 up from £18,000 the previous year, with £15,000 more for the winner, at £25,000.

Aaron Canavan was the defending champion, having won the 2018 edition with a 4–3 victory against Patrick Wallace in the final. However, he lost 3–1 to Leo Fernandez in the quarter finals. Jimmy White won the title, defeating Darren Morgan 5–3 in the final.

== Overview ==
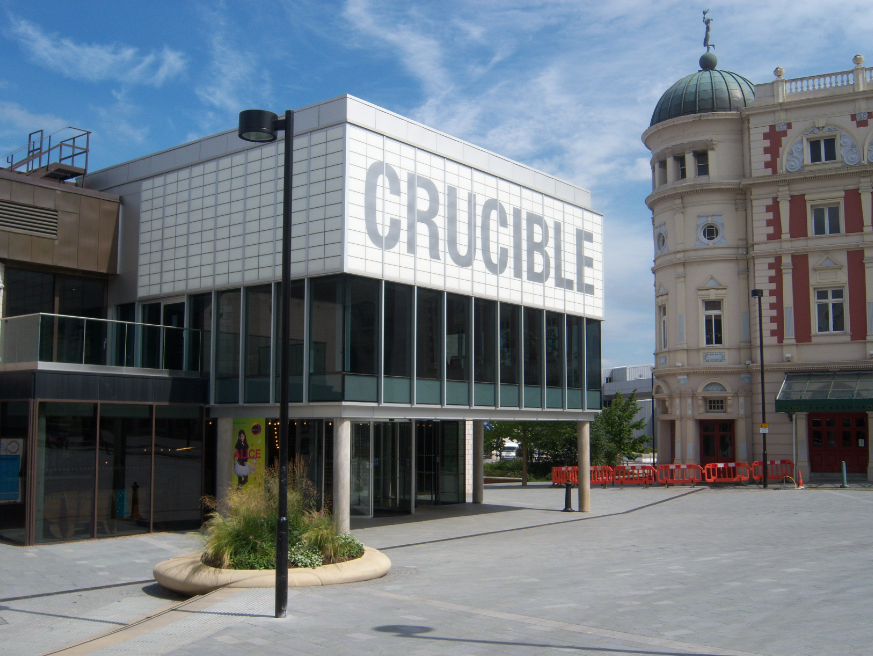
The event was held at the Crucible Theatre in Sheffield, England

The World Seniors Championship is a snooker tournament that first took place in 1991. The event is open to players over 40 who are not in the top 64 of the world rankings. The 2019 event took place from 15 to 18 August 2019 at the Crucible Theatre in Sheffield, England. It was the first event of the 2019–20 World Seniors Tour and the 10th edition of the World Seniors Championship. The event featured 20 participants, with matches being contested as the best-of-5 frames, until the final, which was a best-of-9. Aaron Canavan was the defending champion, having won the 2018 edition with a 4–3 victory against Patrick Wallace in the final.

=== Prize fund ===
The breakdown of the tournament prizes is shown below:

- Winner: £25,000
- Runner-up: £10,000
- Semi-finalist: £7,500
- Quarter-finalist: £3,000
- Highest break: £1,500
- Total: £63,500

=== Participants ===
Fourteen players were invited to play at the event, ten by the WPBSA and four by continental governing bodies:

- (Jersey) Aaron Canavan (defending champion)
- (England) Jimmy White
- (England) Joe Johnson
- (Scotland) Stephen Hendry
- (England) John Parrott
- (Canada) Cliff Thorburn
- (Northern Ireland) Dennis Taylor
- (Malta) Tony Drago
- (England) Tony Knowles
- (England) Willie Thorne
- (Thailand) James Wattana
- (Wales) Darren Morgan (European Billiard Snooker Association nomination)
- (Egypt) ~~Wael Talaat~~ (Asian Billiard Snooker Federation nomination) Replaced by (South Africa) Mohammed Abdelkader
- (China) Chen Gang (Chinese Billiard Snooker Association nomination)
- (New Zealand) Dene O'Kane (Oceanic Billiard Snooker Federation nomination)

In addition, six qualifying events took place during the World Seniors Tour 2018–19, with winners receiving a place at the event.

- WSC Q1 2–4 November: Crucible Sports Club, Newbury, England
  - Qualifier: (Wales) Rhydian Richards
- WSC Q2 16–18 November: Route es Nouaux, Jersey
  - Qualifier: (England) Stuart Watson
- WSC Q3 7–9 December: Corner Bank Sports Bar & Grill, Toronto, Canada
  - Qualifier: (Netherlands) Joris Maas
- WSC Q4 14–16 December: Frames Sports Bar, Coulsdon, Surrey, England
  - Qualifier: (Republic of Ireland) Leo Fernandez
- WSC Q5 12–14 January: CBSA World Snooker Academy, Beijing, China
  - Qualifier: (Hong Kong) Au Chi-wai
- WSC Q6 25–27 January: Q Ball Snooker and Pool, Houston, Texas, United States
  - Qualifier: (Brazil) Igor Figueiredo

== Summary ==
The first two rounds were played on 15 and 16 August 2019 as the best of 5 frames. Four matches were held as qualifiers to reach the last 16. Both James Wattana and Darren Morgan won their matches 3–0, with Wattana making the only century break of the tournament, a 113 in the opening frame. Chinese player Chen Gang and Maltese player Tony Drago also qualified after 3–1 and 3–2 victories. Three of the four would also win their second round match, with Chen defeating Cliff Thorburn, Morgan defeating John Parrott and Wattana completing a whitewash over Joe Johnson. Leo Fernandez and Stephen Hendry also completed second round 3–0 whitewash victories over Joris Maas and Drago, respectively.

The quarter-finals were held on 17 August as the best of five frames. Fernandez completed a 3–1 victory over defending champion Canavan, White defeated Stuart Watson 3–2 whilst Wattana defeated Gang and Morgan defeated Hendry 3–1. The quarter-finals were prefaced by a women's exhibition four player tournament, won by Reanne Evans. The semi-finals, played on 18 August were held between White and Wattana, and Morgan and Fernandez. White won his match 3–1 before Morgan completed a 3–0 victory in the second semi-final.

The final was played on 19 August as the best of nine frames. Morgan won the opening frame, before White made a break of 55 to win the second. White took a 3–2 lead after a break of 53 in frame five. Morgan took frame six to tie the match before White made the highest break of the final, an 86. White took the next frame to complete a 5–3 victory and win the event for the second time. Having lost the World Snooker Championship final at the venue six times, this was the first tournament that White had won at the Crucible Theatre.

== Main draw ==
The draw for the event is shown below. Players in bold denote match winners.

Round 1 Best of 5 frames
Willie Thorne (ENG)	0
**Darren Morgan (WAL)**	**3**
**Tony Drago (MLT)**	**3**
Dene O'Kane (NZL)	2
**James Wattana (THA)**	**3**
Mohammed Abdelkader (RSA)	0
Tony Knowles (ENG)	1
**Chen Gang (CHN)**	**3**

Last 16; Best of 5 frames
**Aaron Canavan (JEY)**	**3**
Au Chi-wai (HKG)	1
**Leo Fernandez (IRL)**	**3**
Joris Maas (NLD)	0
John Parrott (ENG)	2
**Darren Morgan (WAL)**	**3**
**Stephen Hendry (SCO)**	**3**
Tony Drago (MLT)	2
Joe Johnson (ENG)	0
**James Wattana (THA)**	**3**
Cliff Thorburn (CAN)	1
**Chen Gang (CHN)**	**3**
Dennis Taylor (NIR)	0
**Stuart Watson (ENG)**	**3**
**Jimmy White (ENG)**	**3**
Rhydian Richards (WAL)	1

Quarter-finals; Best of 5 frames
Aaron Canavan (JEY)	1
**Leo Fernandez (IRL)**	**3**
**Darren Morgan (WAL)**	**3**
Stephen Hendry (SCO)	1
**James Wattana (THA)**	**3**
Chen Gang (CHN)	1
Stuart Watson (ENG)	2
**Jimmy White (ENG)**	**3**

Semi-finals; Best of 5 frames
Leo Fernandez (IRL)	0
**Darren Morgan (WAL)**	**3**
James Wattana (THA)	1
**Jimmy White (ENG)**	**3**

Final; Best of 9 frames
Darren Morgan (WAL)	3
**Jimmy White (ENG)**	**5**

=== Final ===
Final: Best of 9 frames. Referee: Michaela Tabb Crucible Theatre, 18 August 2019
Darren Morgan; Wales	3–**5**	**Jimmy White**; England
**56**–46, 55–**69** (Morgan 55), **66**–27, 33–**72**, 13–**77** (53), **62**–43, 20–**124** (86), 56–**69**
55	Highest break	**86**
0	Century breaks	0
1	50+ breaks	**2**

== Century breaks ==
There was only one century break made during the event, James Wattana made a 113 in the first round.
