= Snooker Legends =

Sports promoter created in 2009

Logo of the Snooker Legends tour

Snooker Legends was a sports promoter created in 2009 by Jason Francis at Premier Stage Productions to stage events for retired and current snooker players to play exhibition matches. It also involves in player management with players such as Ronnie O'Sullivan and Reanne Evans.

In 2017, Snooker Legends pivoted to holding professional events such as the World Seniors Championship, and later created the World Seniors Tour for players aged 40 and above.

== History ==
=== 2010–13: Snooker Legends Tour ===
The first event was 8 April 2010 and saw Jimmy White, Cliff Thorburn, John Parrott, John Virgo, Michaela Tabb and Alex Higgins return to the Crucible Theatre in Sheffield. The event is best remembered as the last time Alex Higgins played snooker as he died in July that year. Alex was replaced by Dennis Taylor and the tour also featured guest appearances by Ray Reardon, Tony Knowles and Ken Doherty. The highlight of the tour was a maximum 147 break in Redhill by Jimmy White. In 2011, a further 30 events were held and Ronnie O'Sullivan, Kirk Stevens, Doug Mountjoy, Tony Drago joined the team. In Dundalk Jimmy White again had a maximum break, however this was from the break off without his opponent ever having a shot.

In 2012, events saw Steve Davis and Stephen Hendry join the team. 'The Legends Cup' was staged in Bedworth where a team from England and Northern Ireland beat a team from The Rest of the World 18–16. In 2012 Snooker Legends staged a series of 7 events between Ronnie O'Sullivan and Jimmy White. In the first match in Croydon Ronnie made a maximum 147 break, the 3rd perfect break since the tour began.

In 2013, there were 12 events held on the Snooker Legends tour. This included the Legends Cup which was again staged in Bedworth on 10–12 May, and coverage was broadcast live on Eurosport. The teams were England and Northern Ireland vs The Rest of the World, with Dennis Taylor and Cliff Thorburn as respective captains. The Rest of the World won 18–14.

=== 2022–present ===
In early 2022, the 'Merseyside Masters' was staged in Liverpool as an invitational event in the 2021–2022 season.

In 2023, Snooker 900 was created to introduce a shoot-out style event to the Seniors Tour and beyond. The inaugural 900 event, held in conjunction with the World Seniors Tour, was held on 29 December 2023 at Epsom Racecourse and featured six players.

== See also ==
- World Seniors Tour
- Snooker 900
