= Aaron Canavan =

Snooker player from Jersey

Personal information
- Born: 10 August 1975 (age 51) St Helier, Jersey

Sport
- Country: Jersey
- Sport: Snooker

Aaron Canavan (born 10 August 1975) is a professional snooker player from Jersey.

== Career ==
Canavan was the winner of the 2018 World Seniors Championship, beating Dennis Taylor along the way and Patrick Wallace 4–3 in the final. He won £10,000, and competed in the following World Snooker Championship qualifiers, losing 10–1 to Robert Milkins in the first round.

He also finished second in the 2019 Seniors 6-Red World Championship, losing to Jimmy White 4–2 in the final.

In 2025, he again reached the final of the World Seniors Championship, where he lost 4–8 to Alfie Burden.

== Career finals ==
=== Seniors finals: 5 (3 titles) ===
Outcome	No.	Year	Championship	Opponent in the final	Score
Winner	1.	2018	World Seniors Championship	(Northern Ireland) Patrick Wallace	4–3
Runner-up	1.	2019	Seniors 6-Red World Championship	(England) Jimmy White	2–4
Winner	2.	2024	Seniors Tour – Event 7	(England) Andrew Norman	4–3
Winner	3.	2024	Seniors Tour – Event 8	(Wales) Philip Williams	4–3
Runner-up	2.	2025	World Seniors Championship	(England) Alfie Burden	4–8
