= 2018 World Seniors Championship =

Tournament information
- Dates: 21–24 March 2018
- Venue: Baths Hall
- City: Scunthorpe
- Country: England
- Organisation: Snooker Legends
- Format: Seniors event
- Total prize fund: £18,500
- Winner's share: £10,000
- Highest break: (Northern Ireland) Patrick Wallace (80)

Final
- Champion: (Jersey) Aaron Canavan
- Runner-up: (Northern Ireland) Patrick Wallace
- Score: 4–3

The 2018 World Seniors Championship was a snooker tournament, taking place at the Baths Hall in Scunthorpe, England, from 21 to 24 March 2018. Qualifying for the tournament was open to non-tour players, aged 40 and over on 1 January 2018. In addition to the winner's cheque the champion received a place in the qualifying tournament for the 2018 World Snooker Championship.

Peter Lines won the 2017 edition with a 4–0 victory against John Parrott in the final, but as a tour player he was not eligible for this year's edition. Three of the eight seeded participants withdrew prior to the tournament. The five remaining seeds were defeated in the opening round. The Championship was won by Aaron Canavan, who beat Patrick Wallace 4–3 in the final.

== Prize fund ==
The breakdown of the tournament prizes is shown below:

- Winner: £10,000 and a place in WC qualifying
- Runner-up: £3,000
- Semi-finalist: £1,500
- Quarter-finalist: £500
- Highest break: £500
- Total: £18,500

== Field ==
=== Seeded players ===
Players were seeded based on the titles won during their professional careers:

1. (Scotland) Stephen Hendry – 7 world titles (1990, 1992–96, 1999), 18 triple crown titles
2. (England) ~~John Parrott~~ – 1 world title (1991), 2 triple crown titles, 9 ranking titles. Replaced by (England) Lee Richardson, sixth in the amateur rankings
3. (England) Joe Johnson – 1 world title (1986), 1 triple crown title
4. (Northern Ireland) Dennis Taylor – 1 world title (1985), 2 triple crown titles, 2 ranking titles
5. (Malta) ~~Tony Drago~~ – 1 ranking final (1997). Replaced by (England) Simon Dent, fourth in the amateur rankings
6. (England) Tony Knowles – 2 ranking titles (1982, 1983)
7. (Canada) Cliff Thorburn – 1 world title (1980), 4 triple crown titles, 2 ranking titles
8. (England) ~~Willie Thorne~~ – 1 ranking title (1985). Replaced by (England) Gary Filtness, the highest ranked amateur

=== Qualifying ===
Eight qualifying events for the 2018 World Seniors Championship took place during the World Seniors Tour 2017/2018:

- 13–15 October: Crucible Sports & Social Club, Newbury, England (World Q1)
  - Qualifier: (England) Jonathan Bagley
- 27–29 October: Terry Griffiths Matchroom, Llanelli, Wales (World Q2)
  - Qualifier: (Wales) Rhydian Richards
- 17–19 November: The Ballroom, Glasgow, Scotland (World Q3)
  - Qualifier: (Northern Ireland) Patrick Wallace
- 1–3 December: Pot Black Lowestoft, Lowestoft, England (World Q4)
  - Qualifier: (England) Barry Pinches
- 15–17 December: Dunstable Snooker Centre, Dunstable, England (World Q5)
  - Qualifier: (Jersey) Aaron Canavan
- 26–28 January: CBSA World Snooker Academy, Beijing, China (World Q6)
  - Qualifier: (China) Cao Kaisheng
- 22–25 February: Northern Snooker Centre, Leeds, England (World Q7)
  - Qualifier: (England) ~~David Lilley~~. Replaced by the runner-up of the event, (England) Nick Spelman
- 9–11 March: D’Arcy McGees at Spawell, Dublin, Republic of Ireland (World Q8)
  - Qualifier: (Republic of Ireland) John Farrell

Each qualifier took their place alongside invited players and replacements in the main draw of the championship.

== Main draw ==
Last 16; Best of 5* frames
(Scotland) Stephen Hendry (1)	1
(England) Jonathan Bagley	3
(England) Gary Filtness	3*
(England) Barry Pinches	2
(England) Simon Dent	0
(Northern Ireland) Patrick Wallace	3
(England) Joe Johnson (3)	0
(Wales) Rhydian Richards	3
(England) Lee Richardson	2
(China) Cao Kaisheng	3*
(Canada) Cliff Thorburn (7)	2
(England) Nick Spelman	3*
(England) Tony Knowles (6)	1
(Republic of Ireland) John Farrell	3
(Northern Ireland) Dennis Taylor (4)	1
(Jersey) Aaron Canavan	3

Quarter-finals; Best of 5* frames
(England) Jonathan Bagley	3
(England) Gary Filtness	0
(Northern Ireland) Patrick Wallace	3
(Wales) Rhydian Richards	1
(China) Cao Kaisheng	3*
(England) Nick Spelman	2
(Republic of Ireland) John Farrell	1
(Jersey) Aaron Canavan	3

Semi-finals; Best of 5* frames
(England) Jonathan Bagley	2
(Northern Ireland) Patrick Wallace	3*
(China) Cao Kaisheng	2
(Jersey) Aaron Canavan	3*

Final; Best of 7* frames
(Northern Ireland) Patrick Wallace	3
(Jersey) Aaron Canavan	4*

- All matches were played with a 30-second shot clock with players having two time-outs per match
- *Re-spotted black ball replaced final frame deciders

== Final ==
Final: Best of 7 frames. Referee: Michaela Tabb. Baths Hall, Scunthorpe, 24 March 2018.
Patrick Wallace; Northern Ireland	3–4	Aaron Canavan; Jersey
96–13, 45–64, 78–39, 77–45, 23–62, 6–82, 0–7 *(respotted black)
40	Highest break	49
0	Century breaks	0
0	50+ breaks	0
