= 1991 World Seniors Championship =

World Seniors Championship
Tournament information
- Dates: 18–22 September 1991
- Venue: Trentham Gardens
- City: Stoke-on-Trent
- Country: England
- Total prize fund: £50,000
- Winner's share: £16,000
- Highest break: Doug Mountjoy (WAL) (110)

Final
- Champion: Cliff Wilson (WAL)
- Runner-up: Eddie Charlton (AUS)
- Score: 5–4

The 1991 World Seniors Championship was a professional snooker tournament that took place from 18 to 22 September 1991 at Trentham Gardens in Stoke-on-Trent, England. It was the first staging of the World Seniors Championship and was contested by sixteen players aged 40 or more, including several former World Snooker Champions. The event was promoted by Barry Hearn and sanctioned by the World Professional Billiards and Snooker Association.

Cliff Wilson won his first professional title, aged 57, by defeating Eddie Charlton by 5 frames to 4 in the final, after trailing 2–4. Doug Mountjoy made the highest break of the tournament, 110, against Mike Massey in the first round. The final was followed by an unofficial World Trickshot Championship won by Terry Griffiths. The World Seniors Championship was not held again until 2010.

== Overview ==
The 1991 World Seniors Championship was the inaugural event of its kind. It was promoted by Barry Hearn and featured sixteen players. The minimum age for participants was 40, and all eligible former world champions were offered the opportunity to participate. After this, apart from two wild card players chosen by Hearn, Mike Massey and Michael Ferreira, the remaining places were filled by the eight-highest ranked players aged 40 or over in the Snooker world rankings 1991/1992. Six-time world champion Ray Reardon declined an invitation to compete, and was replaced in the draw by Murdo MacLeod. All matches were the best-of-nine frames.

The event was sanctioned by the World Professional Billiards and Snooker Association (WPBSA), and held from 18 to 22 September 1991 at Trentham Gardens in Stoke-on-Trent. There was television coverage on satellite channel Screensport on 20, 21 and 22 September, including live coverage of the semi-finals and final.

=== Prize fund ===
The breakdown of prize money is shown below:

- Winner: £16,000
- Runner-up: £8,000
- Semi-finalist: £4,000
- Quarter-finalist: £2,000
- Last 16: £1,000
- Highest break: £2,000
- Total: £50,000

== Summary ==
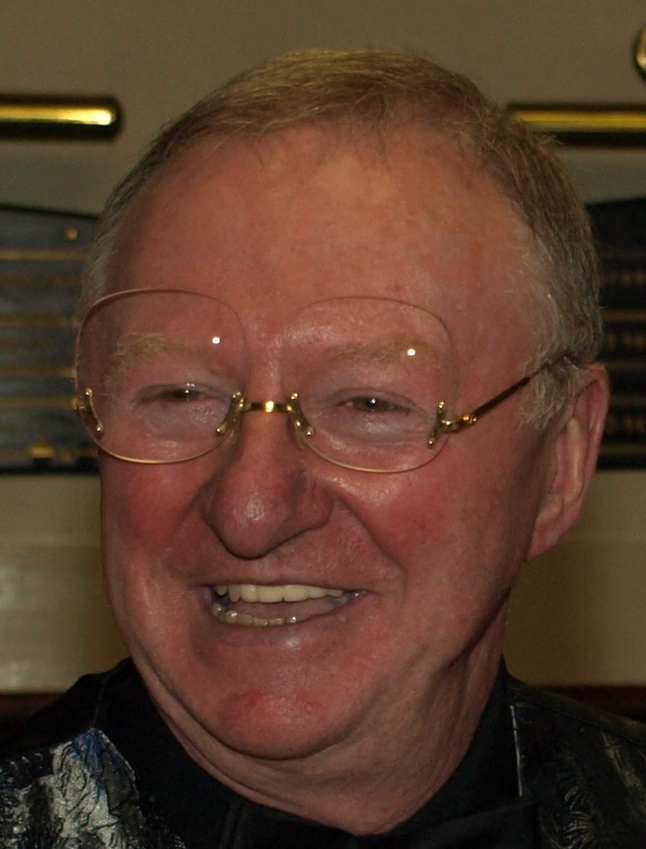
Dennis Taylor (pictured in 2009) was the top seed for the tournament. He lost in the semi-finals to Eddie Charlton.

The first day of play saw three 5–0 whitewashes: by Terry Griffiths, who eliminated the oldest player in the field, 78-year-old Fred Davis; by Cliff Wilson against Rex Williams; and by Eddie Charlton over John Spencer. Alex Higgins, whose one-year ban from playing snooker had elapsed six weeks previously, led Silvino Francisco 3–2 after compiling a 108 break in the fifth frame. The match went to a deciding frame, which was won by Francisco when he made a clearance from the last red ball to the pink ball. After the match, Higgins told reporters that Francisco had distracted him during the match: "he threatened to fight me in a boxing ring. Winning the [tournament] meant a lot to me, but he just wouldn't sit down when I was playing my shots." Francisco responded that the pace at which Higgins played meant that he "just didn't have enough time to move to my chair." Dennis Taylor won the first frame against three-time world amateur English billiards champion Ferreira, but lost the next two frames, before going on to win 5–2. The nine-ball pool specialist Massey recovered from 0–3 to 2–3 against Doug Mountjoy, but won no further frames. Mountjoy compiled a break of 110 in the sixth frame. McLeod defeated John Virgo, who was ranked 41 places above him, 5–4, and Colin Roscoe eliminated Cliff Thorburn 5–3.

Against expectations, Wilson defeated Mountjoy 5–4 in the quarter-finals, despite Mountjoy compiling breaks of 36, 41, 97, 39 and 97. Francisco recovered from 0–3 to 3–3 against Charlton, but lost the next two frames. Taylor defeated Roscoe 5–2, and Griffiths, whose highest break in the match was 34, eliminated MacLeod 5–2.

In the semi-finals, Charlton defeated Taylor, who had been the pre-tournament favourite to win the title, 5–3. Charlton recorded breaks of 62, 52, 65, and, in the last frame, 103, during the match, and reached his first major final for 16 years. Griffiths and Wilson were level at 3–3; Wilson won the seventh frame then added the eight, in which he made a 50 break to complete a 5–3 win.

Wilson recovered from 2–4 behind against Charlton to win the final 5–2, and claim his first professional title. Charlton made a breaks of 87 in the first frame and won it by 120 points to zero. Wilson won the second and third frames, before breaks of 53 and 55 by Charlton contributed to him taking a 4–2 lead. In the next three frames, Wilson had breaks of 36, 51 and 52; he won the deciding frame by 77 points to 8. According to the match report in Snooker Scene magazine, Charlton, who had twice been runner-up in the world snooker championship and once in the World Professional Billiards Championship, "started to falter in a fashion all too familiar with his failures on the brink of other world titles" when leading 4–2. In the same issue, Wilson was described as "handicapped by shoulder and eyesight problems, [he] remains one of the best single ball potters in the game". One of the oldest competitors in the competition, at 57, Wilson's prize money of £16,000 was more than twice his previous highest earnings from a tournament, £7,500 for reaching the quarter-finals of the 1987 Mercantile Credit Classic.

The next world seniors championship was in 2010. In the interim there was a 1997 Seniors Pot Black and the 2000 World Seniors Masters.

== Main draw ==
Numbers in brackets denote seedings.

Last 16; Best of 9 frames
Dennis Taylor (NIR) (1)	5
Michael Ferreira (IND)	2
Cliff Thorburn (CAN)	3
Colin Roscoe (WAL)	5
Eddie Charlton (AUS)	5
John Spencer (ENG)	0
Silvino Francisco (RSA) (4)	5
Alex Higgins (NIR)	4
Terry Griffiths (WAL) (3)	5
Fred Davis (ENG)	0
John Virgo (ENG)	4
Murdo MacLeod (SCO)	5
Cliff Wilson (WAL)	5
Rex Williams (ENG)	0
Doug Mountjoy (WAL) (2)	5
Mike Massey (USA)	2

Quarter-finals; Best of 9 frames
(Northern Ireland) Dennis Taylor (1)	5
(Wales) Colin Roscoe	2
(Australia) Eddie Charlton	5
(South Africa) Silvino Francisco (4)	3
(Wales) Terry Griffiths (3)	5
(Scotland) Murdo MacLeod	2
(Wales) Cliff Wilson	5
(Wales) Doug Mountjoy (2)	4

Semi-finals; Best of 9 frames
(Northern Ireland) Dennis Taylor (1)	3
(Australia) Eddie Charlton	5
(Wales) Terry Griffiths (3)	3
(Wales) Cliff Wilson	5

Final; Best of 9 frames
(Australia) Eddie Charlton	4
(Wales) Cliff Wilson	5

== Final ==
Numbers in parentheses indicate breaks of 50 or more. Scores in bold are winning scores.

Final: Best of 9 frames. Trentham Gardens, Stoke-on-Trent, England, 22 September 1991
Eddie Charlton; Australia	4–**5**	**Cliff Wilson**; Wales
**120**–0 (**87**), 53–**56**, 19–**74**, **91**–17 (**63**), **69**–21 (**53**); **73**–40 (**55**); 55–**69**, 17–**88** (**51**), 8–**77** (**52**)
**87**	Highest break	52
**4**	50+ breaks	2

== Century breaks ==
There were three century breaks made during the tournament:

- 110 – Doug Mountjoy
- 108 – Alex Higgins
- 103 – Eddie Charlton

== World Trickshot Championship ==
After the final, an unofficial World Trickshot championship was held. It was not approved by the WPBSA. The judges, including Steve Davis, held up cards showing their marks for each shot, in the manner of judges for ice skating, and Jeremy Beadle was the compere. Francisco, Griffiths and Massey were tied for first place on 57 points; Griffiths took the title, and £3,000 prize money, by winning a "machine gun shot" play-off.
