= 2019 UK Seniors Championship =

Tournament information
- Dates: 24–25 October 2019
- Venue: Bonus Arena
- City: Kingston upon Hull
- Country: England
- Organisation: World Seniors Tour
- Format: Seniors event
- Total prize fund: £24,500
- Winner's share: £10,000
- Highest break: Michael Judge (IRL) (114)

Final
- Champion: Michael Judge (IRL)
- Runner-up: Jimmy White (ENG)
- Score: 4–2

The 2019 UK Seniors Championship was a snooker tournament, that took place at the Bonus Arena in Kingston upon Hull, England, from 24 to 25 October 2019. It was the second event of the 2019–20 World Seniors Tour, following the 2019 and preceding the 2020 editions of the World Seniors Championship. The event featured a total prize fund of £24,500 with the winner receiving £10,000.

Ken Doherty was the reigning champion, having won the 2018 edition of the tournament, defeating Igor Figueiredo 4–1 in the final. However, Doherty did not take part in the event. Michael Judge won the tournament, beating Jimmy White 4–2 in the final. There were five century breaks made during the tournament, the highest being a 114 made by Judge in the second frame of the final.

== Format ==
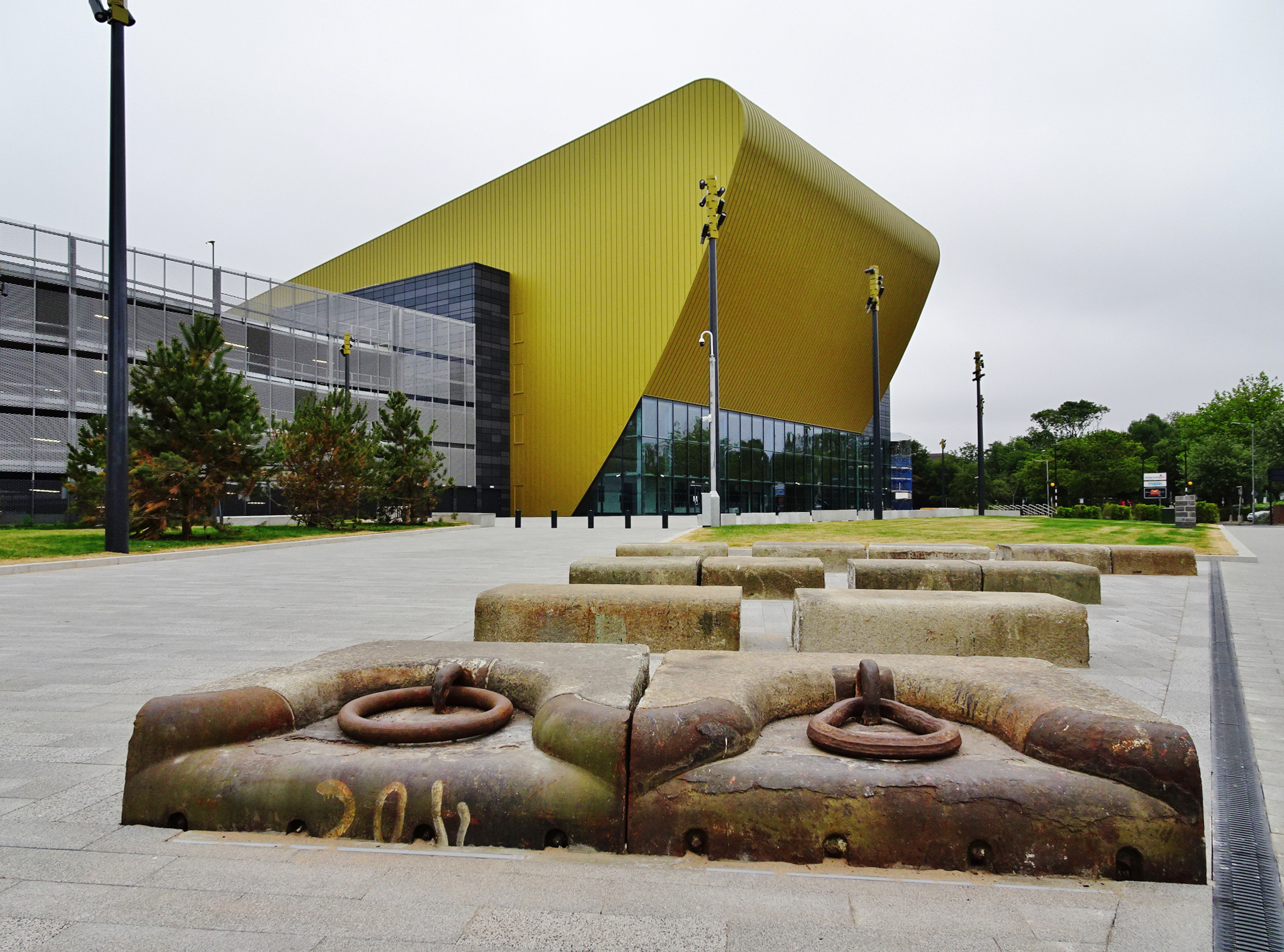
The event took place at the Bonus Arena in Kingston upon Hull.

The UK Seniors Championship is a snooker tournament first held in 2017. The event was open to players over 40 who are not in the top 64 of the world rankings. The 2019 event took place on 24 and 25 October 2019 at the Bonus Arena in Kingston upon Hull, England. The event featured a field of 12 participants, with four players receiving a bye into the quarter-finals. Matches were played as the best-of-5 frames, with the final being played as the best-of-7. The winner of the 2018 UK Seniors Championship, Ken Doherty, did not appear at the event. The first round and the first two matches of the quarter-finals were played on the first day of the event, with the remaining matches held on 25 October.

=== Prize fund ===
The breakdown of prize money is shown below:

- Winner: £10,000
- Runner-up: £5,000
- Semi-finals: £2,500
- Group runners-up: £1,000
- Highest break: £1,000
- Total: £25,000

== Summary ==
The first four matches made up the first round. The oldest man in the field, Cliff Thorburn, trailed 0–2 behind but won the next two frames. However, his opponent, Patrick Wallace, won the deciding frame. Dennis Taylor lost his first round match to Rodney Goggins as a whitewash 0–3. Michael Judge defeated Willie Thorne, also on a deciding frame, while Rory McLeod defeated Sean Lanigan 3–1.

In the quarter-finals, Wallace won a second deciding frame to beat John Parrott 3–2, whilst Stephen Hendry defeated Goggins by the same scoreline. Jimmy White, who had won three of the last four World Seniors events, defeated McLeod on a deciding frame. In the final quarter-final Judge defeated James Wattana 3–1. The semi-finals featured Judge defeating Hendry 3–2, with White defeating Wallace 3–0.

Judge defeated White 4–2 in the final. White made a break of 101 in the opening frame, but Judge made the highest break of the event, a 114 in the second frame to tie the match. White won the third frame to lead 2–1, but Judge won the next three frames to win the match 4–2. After the match, Judge called White his "hero" and that winning the event was "a dream come true".

== Main draw ==
The results from the event and shown below; players in bold denote match winners.

**Round 1** Best of 5 frames
Sean Lanigan (ENG)	1
**Rory McLeod (ENG)**	**3**
Cliff Thorburn (CAN)	2
**Patrick Wallace (NIR)**	**3**
Dennis Taylor (NIR)	0
**Rodney Goggins (IRL)**	**3**
Willie Thorne (ENG)	2
**Michael Judge (IRL)**	**3**

**Quarter-finals**; Best of 5 frames
**Jimmy White (ENG)**	**3**
Rory McLeod (ENG)	2
John Parrott (ENG)	2
**Patrick Wallace (NIR)**	**3**
**Stephen Hendry (SCO)**	**3**
Rodney Goggins (IRL)	2
James Wattana (THA)	1
**Michael Judge (IRL)**	**3**

**Semi-finals**; Best of 5 frames
**Jimmy White (ENG)**	**3**
Patrick Wallace (NIR)	0
Stephen Hendry (SCO)	2
**Michael Judge (IRL)**	**3**

**Final**; Best of 7 frames
Jimmy White (ENG)	2
**Michael Judge (IRL)**	**4**

=== Final ===
Final
Final: Best of 7 frames. Referee: Leo Scullion; Bonus Arena, Hull, England, 25 October 2019
Jimmy White; England	2–**4**	**Michael Judge**; Ireland
**101**–0 (101), 0–**114** (114), **71**–57, 15–**63**, 69–**74** (69), 0–**70** (54)
1	Century breaks	1
2	50+ breaks	2

== Century breaks ==
A total of five century breaks were made during the tournament. The highest break was a 114 made by Judge in the second frame of the final. In making the highest break, Judge was awarded a Chamberlain 1875 watch.

- 114, 111 – Michael Judge
- 104, 101 – Jimmy White
- 100 – Rodney Goggins
