= UK Seniors Championship =

Snooker tournament in the United Kingdom

Tournament information
- Country: United Kingdom
- Established: 2017
- Organisation(s): World Seniors Tour
- Format: Seniors event
- Total prize fund: £14,500
- Current champion: (England) Peter Lines

The UK Seniors Championship is a snooker tournament, part of the World Seniors Tour.

== History ==
The event was created in 2017, as a part of the World Seniors Tour. The first UK Senior championship took place in October 2017, and was won by Jimmy White. The 2018 UK Seniors Championship took place at the Hull Venue, in Hull, England and was won by Ken Doherty who beat Igor Figueiredo in the final.

== Winners ==
Year	Winner	Runner-Up	Final score	Host	Season
2017	(England) Jimmy White	(Republic of Ireland) Ken Doherty	4–2	Redhill	2017–18
2018	(Republic of Ireland) Ken Doherty	(Brazil) Igor Figueiredo	4–1	Kingston upon Hull	2018–19
2019	(Republic of Ireland) Michael Judge	(England) Jimmy White	4–2	Kingston upon Hull	2019–20
2022	(England) Peter Lines	(England) David Lilley	4–1	Kingston upon Hull	2021–22
