= 2019 Indian Open =

Tournament information
- Dates: 27 February – 3 March 2019
- Venue: Grand Hyatt Kochi Bolgatty
- City: Kochi
- Country: India
- Organisation: World Snooker
- Format: Ranking event
- Total prize fund: £323,000
- Winner's share: £50,000
- Highest break: Zhou Yuelong (CHN) (147)

Final
- Champion: Matthew Selt (ENG)
- Runner-up: Lyu Haotian (CHN)
- Score: 5–3

The 2019 Indian Open was a professional snooker tournament. It was due to take place between 18 and 22 September 2018 at the Grand Hyatt Kochi Bolgatty in Kochi, India but was postponed due to the 2018 Kerala floods. The rescheduled Indian Open was played in Kochi from 27 February to 3 March 2019. It was the fifteenth ranking event of the 2018/2019 season.

Qualifying took place on 15 and 16 August 2018 in Preston, England.

John Higgins was the defending champion, having beaten Anthony McGill 5–1 in the 2017 final, but he lost to Matthew Selt in the semi-finals.

Selt went on to win his first ranking title, beating Lyu Haotian 5–3 in the final.

Zhou Yuelong made the first maximum break of his career in the fourth frame of his first round loss to Lyu Haotian. It was the 150th maximum in professional events.

== Prize fund ==
The breakdown of prize money for this year is shown below:

- Winner: £50,000
- Runner-up: £25,000
- Semi-final: £15,000
- Quarter-final: £10,000
- Last 16: £6,000
- Last 32: £4,000
- Last 64: £2,000
- Televised highest break: £2,000
- Total: £323,000

The "rolling 147 prize" for a maximum break: £10,000

== Main draw ==
Last 64; Best of 7 frames
(Scotland) John Higgins	4
(Wales) Duane Jones	0
(Iran) Hossein Vafaei	4
(Wales) Dominic Dale	3
(Wales) Michael White	2
(England) James Cahill	4
(England) David Gilbert	3
(England) Elliot Slessor	4
(Pakistan) Hamza Akbar	w/d
(China) Li Hang	w/o
(England) Ashley Carty	1
(England) Joe Perry	4
(England) Peter Ebdon	4
(England) Ben Woollaston	3
(England) Sam Craigie	4
(China) Liang Wenbo	3
(England) Stuart Bingham	4
(England) Peter Lines	1
(England) Gary Wilson	1
(England) John Astley	4
(China) Yan Bingtao	4
(Northern Ireland) Gerard Greene	3
(China) Lu Ning	4
(England) Liam Highfield	1
(England) Matthew Selt	4
(England) Tom Ford	2
(Northern Ireland) Joe Swail	4
(England) Jack Lisowski	3
(Republic of Ireland) Fergal O'Brien	1
(England) Oliver Lines	4
(Finland) Robin Hull	3
(Iran) Soheil Vahedi	4
(England) Andy Hicks	4
(China) Li Yuan	2
(Israel) Eden Sharav	4
(Cyprus) Michael Georgiou	3
(England) Luke Simmonds	4
(China) Mei Xiwen	0
(China) Zhou Yuelong	3
(China) Lyu Haotian	4
(Thailand) Thepchaiya Un-Nooh	4
(England) Michael Holt	2
(Switzerland) Alexander Ursenbacher	w/d
(Scotland) Graeme Dott	w/o
(England) Paul Davison	0
(England) Mark Davis	4
(China) Yuan Sijun	4
(Malaysia) Thor Chuan Leong	1
(Belgium) Luca Brecel	4
(England) Ian Burns	0
(India) Digvijay Kadian	0
(England) Andrew Higginson	4
(England) Craig Steadman	4
(China) Zhang Yong	3
(England) Jimmy Robertson	0
(Scotland) Scott Donaldson	4
(England) Rory McLeod	2
(England) Anthony Hamilton	4
(England) Sam Baird	2
(China) Zhao Xintong	4
(England) Chris Wakelin	4
(England) Stuart Carrington	3
(Wales) Lee Walker	2
(England) Shaun Murphy	4

Last 32; Best of 7 frames
(Scotland) John Higgins	4
(Iran) Hossein Vafaei	3
(England) James Cahill	4
(England) Elliot Slessor	2
(China) Li Hang	4
(England) Joe Perry	2
(England) Peter Ebdon	1
(England) Sam Craigie	4
(England) Stuart Bingham	4
(England) John Astley	2
(China) Yan Bingtao	0
(China) Lu Ning	4
(England) Matthew Selt	4
(Northern Ireland) Joe Swail	0
(England) Oliver Lines	4
(Iran) Soheil Vahedi	3
(England) Andy Hicks	4
(Israel) Eden Sharav	2
(England) Luke Simmonds	3
(China) Lyu Haotian	4
(Thailand) Thepchaiya Un-Nooh	1
(Scotland) Graeme Dott	4
(England) Mark Davis	4
(China) Yuan Sijun	2
(Belgium) Luca Brecel	4
(England) Andrew Higginson	1
(England) Craig Steadman	1
(Scotland) Scott Donaldson	4
(England) Anthony Hamilton	4
(China) Zhao Xintong	2
(England) Chris Wakelin	4
(England) Shaun Murphy	2

Last 16; Best of 7 frames
(Scotland) John Higgins	4
(England) James Cahill	1
(China) Li Hang	4
(England) Sam Craigie	2
(England) Stuart Bingham	3
(China) Lu Ning	4
(England) Matthew Selt	4
(England) Oliver Lines	3
(England) Andy Hicks	1
(China) Lyu Haotian	4
(Scotland) Graeme Dott	3
(England) Mark Davis	4
(Belgium) Luca Brecel	3
(Scotland) Scott Donaldson	4
(England) Anthony Hamilton	4
(England) Chris Wakelin	2

Quarter-finals; Best of 7 frames
(Scotland) John Higgins	4
(China) Li Hang	3
(China) Lu Ning	3
(England) Matthew Selt	4
(China) Lyu Haotian	4
(England) Mark Davis	2
(Scotland) Scott Donaldson	2
(England) Anthony Hamilton	4

Semi-finals; Best of 7 frames
(Scotland) John Higgins	2
(England) Matthew Selt	4
(China) Lyu Haotian	4
(England) Anthony Hamilton	2

Final; Best of 9 frames
(England) Matthew Selt	5
(China) Lyu Haotian	3

== Final ==
Final: Best of 9 frames. Referee: Colin Humphries; Grand Hyatt Kochi Bolgatty, Kochi, India, 3 March 2019.
Matthew Selt; England	5–3	Lyu Haotian; China
57–48, 89–6, 0–115 (115), 12–78, 21–72, 102–0 (102), 67–49, 96–41
102	Highest break	115
1	Century breaks	1

== Qualifying ==
These matches were held between 15 and 16 August 2018 at the Preston Guild Hall in Preston, England. All matches were best of 7 frames.

(Scotland) John Higgins	4–1 (Note: Match held over and played in Kochi.)	(England) Ashley Hugill
(Wales) Duane Jones	4–1	(Poland) Adam Stefanow
(Iran) Hossein Vafaei	4–1	(England) Sanderson Lam
(Wales) Dominic Dale	4–2	(India) Asutosh Padhy
(Wales) Michael White	4–1	(England) Nigel Bond
(Scotland) Alan McManus	3–4	(England) James Cahill
(England) David Gilbert	4–2	(China) Niu Zhuang
(Wales) Daniel Wells	3–4	(England) Elliot Slessor
(England) Robbie Williams	2–4	(Pakistan) Hamza Akbar
(China) Li Hang	4–0	(Egypt) Basem Eltahhan
(China) Xu Si	0–4	(England) Ashley Carty
(England) Joe Perry	4–0	(England) Joe O'Connor
(England) Peter Ebdon	4–3	(Wales) Jamie Clarke
(England) Ben Woollaston	4–0	(India) S Shrikrishna
(England) Jimmy White	0–4	(England) Sam Craigie
(China) Liang Wenbo	4–0	(England) Mitchell Mann
(England) Stuart Bingham	4–1	(Scotland) Chris Totten
(England) Peter Lines	4–3	(China) Zhang Anda
(England) Gary Wilson	4–2	(England) Steven Hallworth
(England) Mike Dunn	3–4	(England) John Astley
(China) Yan Bingtao	4–2	(Republic of Ireland) Leo Fernandez
(Northern Ireland) Gerard Greene	4–1	(Hong Kong) Andy Lee
(England) Robert Milkins	0–4	(China) Lu Ning
(England) Liam Highfield	4–2	(England) Billy Joe Castle
(England) Matthew Selt	4–2	(China) Zhang Jiankang
(England) Tom Ford	4–3	(Northern Ireland) Jordan Brown
(England) Martin O'Donnell	2–4	(Northern Ireland) Joe Swail
(England) Jack Lisowski	4–0	(India) Himanshu Dinesh Jain
(Republic of Ireland) Fergal O'Brien	4–2	(Thailand) Dechawat Poomjaeng
(England) Mark Joyce	2–4	(England) Oliver Lines
(Finland) Robin Hull	4–2	(England) Alfie Burden
(Northern Ireland) Mark Allen	w/d–w/o	(Iran) Soheil Vahedi
(Australia) Neil Robertson	w/d–w/o	(England) Andy Hicks
(China) Li Yuan	4–3	(Scotland) Ross Muir
(Norway) Kurt Maflin	1–4	(Israel) Eden Sharav
(Cyprus) Michael Georgiou	4–1	(England) Ben Hancorn
(China) Xiao Guodong	w/d–w/o	(England) Luke Simmonds
(Thailand) Sunny Akani	0–4	(China) Mei Xiwen
(China) Zhou Yuelong	4–1	(India) Laxman Rawat
(China) Lyu Haotian	4–3	(China) Tian Pengfei
(Thailand) Thepchaiya Un-Nooh	4–2	(England) Adam Duffy
(England) Michael Holt	4–1	(China) Chen Zifan
(Switzerland) Alexander Ursenbacher	4–2	(Germany) Simon Lichtenberg
(Scotland) Graeme Dott	4–0	(Wales) Kishan Hirani
(Thailand) Noppon Saengkham	2–4	(England) Paul Davison
(England) Mark Davis	4–1	(England) Sean O'Sullivan
(China) Yuan Sijun	4–0	(England) Hammad Miah
(Scotland) Anthony McGill	1–4	(Malaysia) Thor Chuan Leong
(Belgium) Luca Brecel	4–3	(England) Simon Bedford
(England) Ian Burns	4–2	(China) Chen Feilong
(Wales) Jamie Jones	w/d–w/o	(India) Digvijay Kadian
(England) Andrew Higginson	4–1	(England) Harvey Chandler
(England) Mark King	2–4	(England) Craig Steadman
(China) Zhang Yong	4–2	(China) Fan Zhengyi
(England) Jimmy Robertson	4–3	(England) David Lilley
(Scotland) Scott Donaldson	4–3	(Germany) Lukas Kleckers
(England) Rory McLeod	4–3	(England) Rod Lawler
(England) Anthony Hamilton	4–1	(England) Farakh Ajaib
(Republic of Ireland) Ken Doherty	1–4	(England) Sam Baird
(England) Ricky Walden	3–4	(China) Zhao Xintong
(England) Chris Wakelin	4–2	(Wales) Jak Jones
(England) Stuart Carrington	4–1	(China) Luo Honghao
(England) Allan Taylor	1–4	(Wales) Lee Walker
(England) Shaun Murphy	4–1	(India) Lucky Vatnani

== Century breaks ==
=== Main stage centuries ===
There were a total of 33 century breaks made during the tournament. Zhou Yuelong made a century in a held over match.

- 147, 102 – Zhou Yuelong
- 140 – Mark Davis
- 140 – Zhao Xintong
- 137 – Yuan Sijun
- 136 – Graeme Dott
- 133 – Andrew Higginson
- 132 – Scott Donaldson
- 130, 116, 109 – Li Hang
- 127, 113 – Anthony Hamilton
- 125 – Joe Perry
- 123 – Stuart Bingham
- 121, 104, 104 – John Higgins
- 120, 109, 101 – Luca Brecel
- 115, 114, 106 – Lyu Haotian
- 108 – Peter Ebdon
- 108 – Shaun Murphy
- 106, 103 – Hossein Vafaei
- 104 – Sam Craigie
- 103 – Sam Baird
- 103, 102 – Matthew Selt
- 102 – Michael Holt

=== Qualifying stage centuries ===
There were a total of 10 century breaks made during the qualifying matches preceding the event.

- 135 – Hamza Akbar
- 122 – Rod Lawler
- 118 – Joe Swail
- 115 – Lyu Haotian
- 114 – Ross Muir
- 110 – Oliver Lines
- 102 – Gerard Greene
- 102 – Michael Holt
- 101 – Stuart Bingham
- 101 – Elliot Slessor
