= 2022 UK Seniors Championship =

Tournament information
- Dates: 4–7 January 2022
- Venue: Bonus Arena
- City: Hull
- Country: England
- Organisation: World Seniors Tour
- Format: Seniors event
- Highest break: David Lilley (ENG) (109)

Final
- Champion: Peter Lines (ENG)
- Runner-up: David Lilley (ENG)
- Score: 4–1

The 2022 UK Seniors Championship was a seniors' snooker tournament that took place from 4 to 7 January 2022 at the Bonus Arena in Hull, England. It was the first World Seniors Tour event of the 2021–22 snooker season.

Michael Judge was the defending champion, having defeated Jimmy White 4–2 in the 2019 edition of the event. However, Judge lost 1–3 to Peter Lines in the first round. Lines went on to win the tournament, beating David Lilley 4–1 in the final.

The tournament was the final event in which 1980 World Champion and three-time Masters champion Cliff Thorburn competed. He played his final match against Kuldesh Johal on 5 January 2022, eleven days before turning 74.

== Tournament draw ==
Below are the results for the main draw. Seedings are shown in the leftmost boxes, and match winners are denoted in bold.

**Last 16**; Best of 5 frames
1 | Michael Judge (IRL) | 1
**Peter Lines (ENG)** | **3**
8 | Cliff Thorburn (CAN) | 0
**Kuldesh Johal (ENG)** | **3**
**5** | **Stephen Hendry (SCO)** | **3**
Barry Pinches (ENG) | 2
**4** | **Ken Doherty (IRL)** | **3**
Lee Walker (WAL) | 0
**3** | **Jimmy White (ENG)** | **3**
Patrick Wallace (NIR) | 1
6 | John Parrott (ENG) | 0
**Wayne Cooper (ENG)** | **3**
**7** | **Joe Johnson (ENG)** | **3**
Rod Lawler (ENG) | 2
**2** | **David Lilley (ENG)** | **3**
Philip Williams (WAL) | 0

**Quarter–finals**; Best of 7 frames
**(England) Peter Lines** | **4**
(England) Kuldesh Johal | 1
5 | (Scotland) Stephen Hendry | 1
**4** | **(Republic of Ireland) Ken Doherty** | **4**
**3** | **(England) Jimmy White** | **4**
(England) Wayne Cooper | 1
7 | (England) Joe Johnson | 0
**2** | **(England) David Lilley** | **4**

**Semi–finals**; Best of 7 frames
**(England) Peter Lines** | **4**
4 | (Republic of Ireland) Ken Doherty | 2
3 | (England) Jimmy White | 3
**2** | **(England) David Lilley** | **4**

**Final**; Best of 7 frames
**(England) Peter Lines** | **4**
2 | (England) David Lilley | 1

=== Final ===
Final: Best of 7 frames. Referee: Michaela Tabb; Bonus Arena, Hull, England, 7 January 2022
| Peter Lines; England | 4–1 | David Lilley; England |
Frame scores: 23–**70**, **67**–66 (60 Lilley), **71**–21, **58**–25, **68**–56
| 47 | Highest break | **60** |
| 0 | Century breaks | 0 |
| 0 | 50+ breaks | **1** |

== Century breaks ==
A total of 2 century breaks were made during the tournament.

- 109 – David Lilley
- 102 – Wayne Cooper
