= Peter Lines =

English snooker player (born 1969)

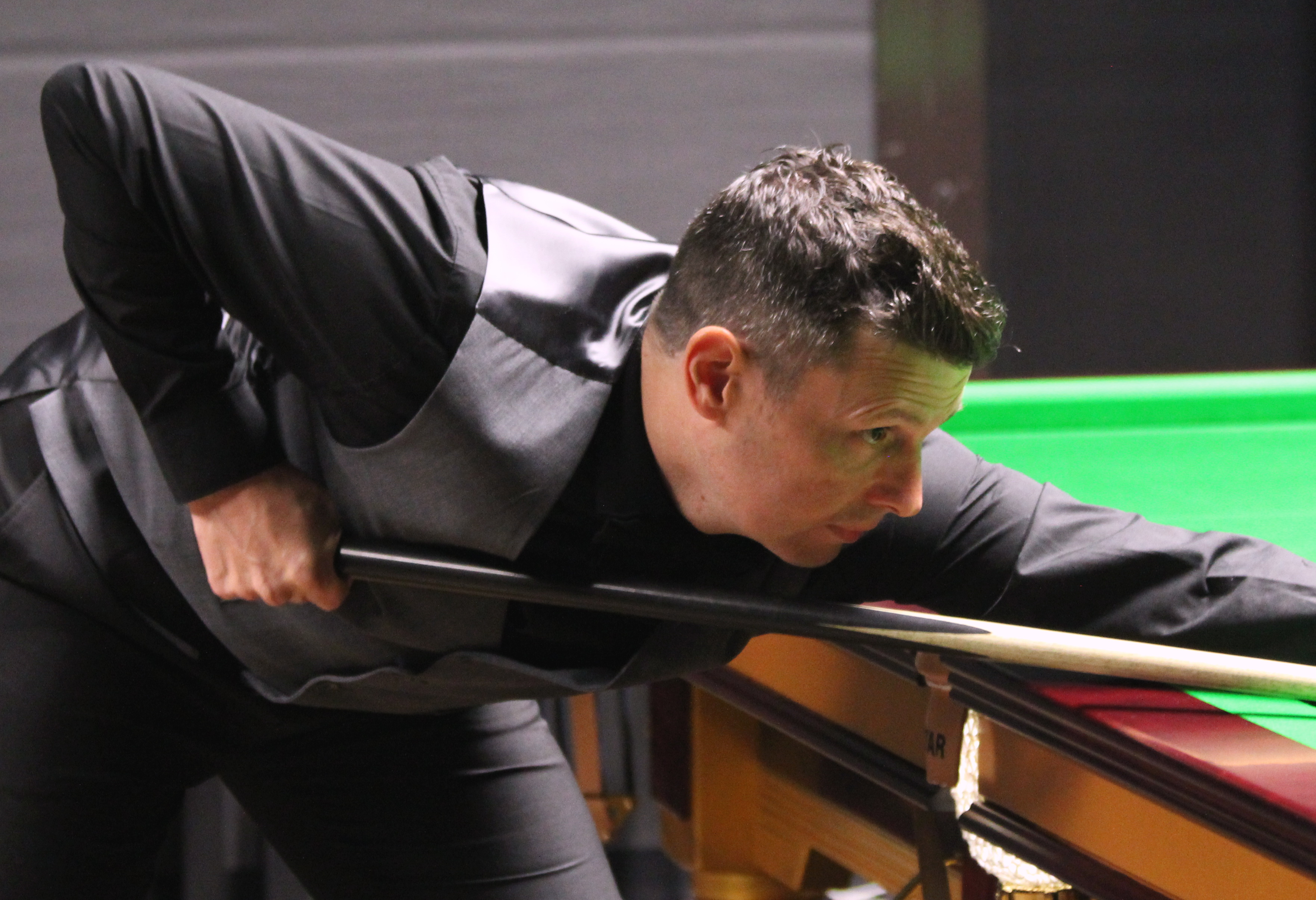
- Lines at the 2016 Paul Hunter Classic

Personal information
- Born: 11 December 1969 (age 56) Leeds, England

Sport
- Country: England
- Sport: Snooker
- Professional: 1991–2004, 2006/2007, 2008–2016, 2017–2023
- Highest ranking: 42 (1999/2000)
- Best ranking finish: Semi-final (x1)

Peter Lines (born 11 December 1969) is an English former professional snooker player. He has reached the semi-finals of one ranking tournament, the 2018 Paul Hunter Classic. He reached his highest ranking, 42nd in the world, in 1999. He is the father of professional snooker player Oliver Lines. In January 2022, he won the 2022 UK Seniors Championship, part of the World Seniors Tour.

== Career ==
Lines turned professional in 1991, and in his debut season reached the last 32 stage twice, at the 1992 Strachan Open and the 1992 Asian Open. He had few wins in the next few seasons, although he qualified for the 1995 International Open, beating players including Fergal O'Brien and Doug Mountjoy in the process. Lines briefly fell off tour in 1997 but returned immediately via Qualifying School, and his results started to improve. The 1997/98 season saw him reach the last 32 of the Welsh Open and Scottish Open before coming through qualifying for the World Championship to reach The Crucible for the first (and to date only) time in his career; there he was beaten 10–4 by John Parrott, but not before compiling a 141 total clearance - the highest break by a debutant. As a result, he finished the season ranked 53, and rose to 42 after the next season, despite having failed to reach another last 32.

Lines scored his best ever result at the 1999 China International as he defeated John Higgins and Peter Ebdon en route to his first career quarter-final, where he lost 4–5 to Brian Morgan. Following this result, however, he started to struggle for form and to slip down the rankings, before an eventual relegation from the tour in 2004. He briefly regained his place in 2006 but was again relegated after another poor season.

After working with coach Steve Prest, Lines had a successful 2007–08 season in the Pontins International Open Series. He won one event and reached the final of another to finish second in the top 8, thus qualifying for the main tour. He carried his good form into the 2008–09 season, finishing in the top 64 to retain his tour place. During the next season, he reached the last 64 of the Shanghai Masters and the last 48 of the Grand Prix, before a strong run in the UK Championship. He defeated Xiao Guodong, Ian McCulloch and Nigel Bond to qualify for the venue stages; there he beat Marco Fu 9–3, before causing an upset by edging out Mark Williams 9–8 to reach his second career quarter-final. Despite the 5–9 loss to Stephen Maguire, this performance could have allowed Lines to return to the top 48 of the world rankings, but another drop in form resulted in three opening round defeats in the remaining tournaments of the season to leave him ranked 50.

The 2010–11 season saw Lines record a number of good results in the newly introduced minor-ranking PTC events, with three last 16 appearances and a quarter-final at Event 5. However, his performances in the major tournaments were less successful; aside from a last 48 appearance in the UK Championship, he won only one more match. As a result, he could not improve his ranking at the end of the season. Lines qualified for the 2011 UK Championship by defeating Ken Doherty 6–5 in round 4 of qualifying. He played Martin Gould in the last 32 and was beaten 6–2. He qualified for the 2013 German Masters by defeating John Higgins 5–3 in round 4 of qualifying. He played Ken Doherty in the last 32 and won 5–3, before losing 3–5 to Marco Fu in the last 16. In June 2014 he won the Pink Ribbon pro–am event, defeating Lee Walker 4–1 in the final. Lines beat defending champion Neil Robertson on a run to the last 32 of the 2016 UK Championship. In March 2017 he won the World Seniors Championship, defeating John Parrott 4–0 in the final.

He regained full professional status for the 2017–18 season by coming through an EBSA playoff, where he defeated Zack Richardson 4–0 in the final round. He reached the last 16 on two occasions during the 2017/18 campaign, at the 2017 Paul Hunter Classic and the 2017 European Masters. During the 2019-2020 season, Lines reached the last 16 of the 2020 Snooker Shoot Out. He is known for having a 4-3 (excluding the Shoot-Out) winning head-to-head record against 4-time world champion John Higgins.

While playing Xiao Guodong at the 2021 Northern Ireland Open qualifiers in Leicester, Lines became angry over what he regarded as the incorrect replacement of balls after referee Brendan Moore called a foul and a miss against Xiao. Lines confronted his opponent in the players' lounge after the match, accused him of cheating, swore at him, and challenged him to a fight, which led to security personnel removing Lines from the area. A WPBSA disciplinary committee fined him £2,500 over the incident and ordered him to pay costs of £5,464.80 for breaching conduct rules and bringing the game into disrepute.

In January 2022, Lines won the UK Seniors Championship, defeating David Lilley 4–1 in the final. He finished the 2022–23 season ranked 73rd in the world rankings and was relegated from the professional tour.

== Personal life ==
He is married to Sarah and has three children, Penny, Leo and Oliver. Both he and Oliver practise at the Northern Snooker Centre in Leeds.

== Performance and rankings timeline ==
Tournament	1991/ 92	1992/ 93	1993/ 94	1994/ 95	1995/ 96	1996/ 97	1997/ 98	1998/ 99	1999/ 00	2000/ 01	2001/ 02	2002/ 03	2003/ 04	2004/ 05	2005/ 06	2006/ 07	2007/ 08	2008/ 09	2009/ 10	2010/ 11	2011/ 12	2012/ 13	2013/ 14	2014/ 15	2015/ 16	2016/ 17	2017/ 18	2018/ 19	2019/ 20	2020/ 21	2021/ 22	2022/ 23	2023/ 24	2024/ 25
Ranking (Note: From the 2010/2011 season it shows the ranking at the beginning of the season)	(Note: New players don't have a ranking)	73	111	129	129	111	90	53	42	45	59	74	83	(Note: He was an amateur)					64	50	50	53	57	61	57			75	(Note: Players qualified through Q School started the season without ranking points)	89		73		
Ranking tournaments
Championship League	Tournament Not Held																Non-Ranking Event													RR	2R	RR	RR	RR
English Open	Tournament Not Held																									2R	1R	1R	1R	WD	LQ	1R	A	A
British Open	LQ	LQ	LQ	LQ	LQ	LQ	A	LQ	LQ	1R	1R	1R	1R	A	Tournament Not Held																1R	1R	A	A
Northern Ireland Open	Tournament Not Held																									1R	1R	2R	1R	1R	LQ	LQ	A	A
International Championship	Tournament Not Held																					LQ	2R	LQ	LQ	LQ	LQ	1R	LQ	Not Held			A	A
UK Championship	LQ	LQ	LQ	LQ	LQ	1R	1R	1R	LQ	LQ	LQ	LQ	LQ	A	A	LQ	A	LQ	QF	LQ	1R	LQ	2R	2R	1R	3R	3R	1R	1R	1R	4R	LQ	A	LQ
Shoot Out	Tournament Not Held																			Non-Ranking Event						1R	2R	2R	4R	1R	2R	1R	A	
Scottish Open (Note: The event was called the International Open (1992/1993–1996/1997) and the Players Championship (2003/2004))	NH	LQ	LQ	2R	LQ	LQ	2R	1R	1R	LQ	LQ	LQ	LQ	Tournament Not Held								MR	Not Held			1R	3R	1R	2R	1R	LQ	A	A	
German Masters (Note: The event was called the German Open (1995/1996–1997/1998))	Tournament Not Held				LQ	LQ	LQ	NR	Tournament Not Held											LQ	LQ	2R	1R	LQ	LQ	LQ	LQ	LQ	LQ	LQ	LQ	LQ	A	
Welsh Open	1R	LQ	LQ	LQ	LQ	1R	2R	LQ	1R	2R	LQ	LQ	LQ	A	A	LQ	A	LQ	LQ	LQ	LQ	LQ	2R	1R	2R	A	1R	2R	1R	1R	LQ	LQ	A	
World Open (Note: The event was called the Grand Prix (1991/1992–2000/2001 and 2004/2005–2009/2010) and the LG Cup (2001/2002–2003/2004))	LQ	LQ	LQ	LQ	LQ	LQ	1R	LQ	LQ	LQ	LQ	LQ	LQ	A	A	LQ	A	LQ	LQ	LQ	LQ	LQ	LQ	Not Held		LQ	LQ	LQ	LQ	Not Held			A	
World Grand Prix	Tournament Not Held																							NR	DNQ	DNQ	DNQ	DNQ	DNQ	DNQ	DNQ	DNQ	DNQ	
Players Championship (Note: The event was called the Players Tour Championship Grand Final (2010/2011–2015/2016))	Tournament Not Held																			DNQ	DNQ	DNQ	DNQ	DNQ	DNQ	DNQ	DNQ	DNQ	DNQ	DNQ	DNQ	DNQ	DNQ	
Tour Championship	Tournament Not Held																											DNQ	DNQ	DNQ	DNQ	DNQ	DNQ	
World Championship	LQ	LQ	LQ	LQ	LQ	LQ	1R	LQ	LQ	LQ	LQ	LQ	LQ	LQ	A	LQ	A	LQ	LQ	LQ	LQ	LQ	LQ	LQ	LQ	LQ	LQ	LQ	LQ	LQ	LQ	LQ	LQ	
Non-ranking tournaments
The Masters	LQ	LQ	LQ	LQ	LQ	LQ	LQ	LQ	LQ	LQ	LQ	LQ	A	A	A	A	LQ	A	A	A	A	A	A	A	A	A	A	A	A	A	A	A	A	
World Seniors Championship	A	Tournament Not Held																		LQ	A	A	A	LQ	LQ	W	A	NH	A	A	SF	1R	A	
Former ranking tournaments
Classic	LQ	Tournament Not Held																																
Strachan Open (Note: The event was called the Strachan Challenge (1992/1993–1993/1994))	2R	MR	NR	Tournament Not Held																														
Asian Classic (Note: The event was called the Dubai Classic (1991/1992–1994/1995) and the Thailand Classic (1995/1996))	LQ	1R	LQ	LQ	LQ	LQ	Tournament Not Held																											
Malta Grand Prix	Not Held			Non-Ranking Event					LQ	NR	Tournament Not Held																							
Thailand Masters (Note: The event was called the Asian Open (1991/1992–1992/1993) and the Thailand Open (1993/1994–1996/1997))	2R	LQ	LQ	LQ	LQ	1R	LQ	LQ	LQ	LQ	LQ	NR	Not Held			NR	Tournament Not Held																	
Irish Masters	Non-Ranking Event											LQ	LQ	A	NH	NR	Tournament Not Held																	
Northern Ireland Trophy	Tournament Not Held														NR	LQ	A	LQ	Tournament Not Held															
Bahrain Championship	Tournament Not Held																	LQ	Tournament Not Held															
Wuxi Classic (Note: The event was called the Jiangsu Classic (2008/2009–2009/2010))	Tournament Not Held																	Non-Ranking Event				LQ	3R	LQ	Tournament Not Held									
Australian Goldfields Open (Note: The event was called the Australian Open (1994/1995–1995/1996) and the Australian Masters (1995/1996))	Not Held			Non-Ranking		Tournament Not Held															LQ	LQ	LQ	LQ	LQ	Tournament Not Held								
Shanghai Masters	Tournament Not Held																A	LQ	LQ	LQ	LQ	LQ	2R	LQ	LQ	LQ	LQ	Non-Ranking		Not Held			Non-Ranking	
Paul Hunter Classic (Note: The event was called the Grand Prix Fürth (2004/2005) and the Fürth German Open (2005/2006–2006/2007))	Tournament Not Held													Pro-am Event						Minor-Ranking Event						3R	4R	SF	NR	Tournament Not Held				
Indian Open	Tournament Not Held																						LQ	1R	NH	LQ	LQ	1R	Tournament Not Held					
China Open (Note: The event was called the China International (1997/1998–1998/1999))	Tournament Not Held						NR	WR	QF	LQ	LQ	Not Held		A	A	LQ	A	LQ	LQ	LQ	LQ	LQ	1R	1R	1R	LQ	LQ	LQ	Tournament Not Held					
Riga Masters (Note: The event was called the Riga Open (2014/2015–2015/2016))	Tournament Not Held																							Minor-Rank		LQ	LQ	1R	LQ	Tournament Not Held				
China Championship	Tournament Not Held																									NR	LQ	LQ	LQ	Tournament Not Held				
WST Pro Series	Tournament Not Held																													RR	Tournament Not Held			
Turkish Masters	Tournament Not Held																														LQ	Not Held		
Gibraltar Open	Tournament Not Held																								MR	1R	1R	3R	1R	1R	2R	Not Held		
WST Classic	Tournament Not Held																															1R	Not Held	
European Masters (Note: The event was called the European Open (1991/1992–1996/1997 and 2001/2002–2003/2004), the Irish Open (1998/1999) and the Malta Cup (2004/2005–2007/2008))	LQ	LQ	LQ	LQ	LQ	LQ	NH	LQ	Not Held		LQ	LQ	LQ	A	A	LQ	NR	Tournament Not Held								LQ	3R	2R	LQ	2R	LQ	LQ	A	NH
Former non-ranking tournaments
Shoot Out	Tournament Not Held																			3R	1R	2R	1R	1R	2R	Ranking Event								
Six-red World Championship (Note: The event was called the Six-red Snooker International (2008/2009) and the Six-red World Grand Prix (2009/2010))	Tournament Not Held																	A	A	A	NH	A	A	A	A	A	A	A	A	Not Held		LQ	Not Held	

Performance Table Legend
LQ	lost in the qualifying draw	#R	lost in the early rounds of the tournament (WR = Wildcard round, RR = Round robin)	QF	lost in the quarter-finals
SF	lost in the semi-finals	F	lost in the final	W	won the tournament
DNQ	did not qualify for the tournament	A	did not participate in the tournament	WD	withdrew from the tournament
DQ	disqualified from the tournament				

NH / Not Held	event was not held.
NR / Non-Ranking Event	event is/was no longer a ranking event.
R / Ranking Event	event is/was a ranking event.
MR / Minor-Ranking Event	means an event is/was a minor-ranking event.
PA / Pro-am Event	means an event is/was a pro-am event.

== Career finals ==
=== Non-ranking finals: 1 (1 title) ===
Outcome	No.	Year	Championship	Opponent in the final	Score
Winner	1.	1998	Merseyside Professional Championship	(Wales) Lee Walker	5–4

=== Seniors finals: 2 (2 titles) ===
Outcome	No.	Year	Championship	Opponent in the final	Score
Winner	1.	2017	World Seniors Championship	(England) John Parrott	4–0
Winner	2.	2022	UK Seniors Championship	(England) David Lilley	4–1

=== Pro-am finals: 7 (5 titles) ===
Outcome	No.	Year	Championship	Opponent in the final	Score
Winner	1.	1993	Pontins Autumn Open	(England) Andrew Hannah	5–3
Winner	2.	2008	Pontins Pro-Am - Event 3	(England) Judd Trump	4–3
Winner	3.	2008	Pontins Pro-Am - Event 5	(England) Paul Davison	4–1
Winner	4.	2008	Pontins Pro-Am - Event 6	(England) Stephen Craigie	4–1
Runner-up	1.	2009	Pontins Pro-Am - Event 3	(England) Judd Trump	2–5
Runner-up	2.	2012	Pink Ribbon	(England) Stuart Bingham	0–4
Winner	5.	2014	Pink Ribbon	(Wales) Lee Walker	4–1

=== Amateur finals: 5 (3 titles) ===
Outcome	No.	Year	Championship	Opponent in the final	Score
Runner-up	1.	1996	English Amateur Championship	(England) Stuart Bingham	4–8
Winner	1.	2007	PIOS – Event 5	(Wales) Daniel Wells	6–5
Runner-up	2.	2008	PIOS – Event 7	(Wales) Jamie Jones	2–6
Winner	2.	2024	Q Tour – Event 7	(Germany) Umut Dikme	5–1
Winner	3.	2025	Q Tour – Event 2	(England) Peter Devlin	4–3
