= Luke Simmonds =

English snooker player (born 1979)

Personal information
- Born: 7 December 1979 (age 46) Cornwall, United Kingdom

Sport
- Country: England
- Sport: Snooker
- Professional: 2001/2002, 2003/2004
- Highest ranking: 94 (2003–04)
- Best ranking finish: Last 32 (x2)

Luke Simmonds (born 7 December 1979) is an English former professional snooker player.

== Career ==
=== Early career ===
Simmonds won the World Under-21 Championship in Malta in 1998, defeating Robert Murphy 11–2 in the final, before beating Ryan Day 11–10 to become World Amateur champion in the same year.

Simmonds success in becoming a double World Champion within 5 weeks didn't count for much, as this did not advance him on to the pro tour.

He first experienced competitive snooker during the 1997/1998 season, when he entered three tournaments; in the Benson & Hedges Championship, he won his first match 5–0 against Rajan Sharma, but lost in the next round 1–5 to Philip Seaton. First-round defeats in Event 1 of that season's UK Tour and qualifying for the World Championship followed, and he thereafter took a year-long hiatus from competing.

Upon his return in 1999, Simmonds entered the 2000 World Championship, losing in the fifth pre-qualifying round. During the 2000/2001 season, he played on the Challenge Tour, reaching the semi-finals at Event 1 - where he lost 1–5 to Andrew Norman - and the quarter-finals at Event 3, where Kurt Maflin beat him 5–3, before reaching his first career final at Event 4. Drawn against nineteen-year-old Shaun Murphy, Simmonds lost 2–6, but his performances over the course of the season were sufficient for him to earn a place on the main tour.

=== Professional - 2001 to 2004 ===
Simmonds' debut season as a professional began well, as he recorded back-to-back victories over David McDonnell and Surinder Gill in the British Open, before losing in the third round 2–5 to Jonathan Birch. He could not progress any further than the last 96 in any other tournament, however, and a 5–10 loss to Barry Pinches at this stage of the 2002 World Championship meant he dropped off the tour after only one season.

Back in the amateur ranks, Simmonds once again found success, notably reaching his second final at Event 3 of the 2003 Challenge Tour. Michael Rhodes defeated him 6–5, but this was enough to assure him of a return to the main tour for the 2003/2004 season.

Simmonds began that season ranked 126th, but it heralded no more success than his first. He reached the last 80 in three tournaments - the 2004 Welsh Open, where he lost 4–5 to Patrick Wallace, the Irish Masters, where Andy Hicks defeated him 5–1, and the Players Championship, where he was whitewashed 5–0 by Murphy - but, after a 5–10 loss to Ian Preece in World Championship qualifying, he was ranked 94th at the season's conclusion. Although he had broken into the top 100 for the first time, he was again relegated from the main tour.

=== Amateur return ===
After a three-year break, Simmonds entered several Pontin's International Open Series events in the 2007/2008 season; he reached the last 16 at Event 2, but lost there 2–4 to Andrew Pagett.

He entered Q-School in 2011 and 2015 attempting to regain a place on the tour, and as a result of his performances in 2015, where he lost his final match in Event Two 4–3 to Paul Davison, he was allowed to participate as a wildcard entry in several ranking tournaments in the 2015/2016 season. However, Simmonds did not win a match; he lost 1–5 to Michael Leslie in the Shanghai Masters, 0–6 to Ali Carter in the International Championship, and 2–5 to Barry Hawkins in the German Masters, and led Robbie Williams 3–0 in the Welsh Open before succumbing 3–4.

In qualifying for the 2016 World Championship, Simmonds lost 2–10 to Liam Highfield; since his last involvement with the professional game, he has been active on the English amateur tour.

== Performance and rankings timeline ==
Tournament	1997/ 98	1999/ 00	2000/ 01	2001/ 02	2002/ 03	2003/ 04	2015/ 16	2017/ 18	2018/ 19	2022/ 23
Ranking (Note: From the 2010/2011 season it shows the ranking at the beginning of the season)	(Note: He was an amateur)			(Note: New players on the Main Tour don't have a ranking)						
Ranking tournaments
Championship League	Tournament Not Held						Non-Ranking Event			RR
European Masters (Note: The event was called the European Open (2001/2002–2003/2004))	Tournament Not Held			LQ	A	LQ	NH	A	A	LQ
British Open	A	A	A	LQ	A	LQ	Tournament Not Held			A
Northern Ireland Open	Tournament Not Held							A	1R	A
UK Championship	A	A	A	LQ	A	LQ	A	A	1R	A
Scottish Open (Note: The event was called the Players Championship (2003/2004))	A	A	A	LQ	A	LQ	NH	A	2R	A
English Open	Tournament Not Held							A	1R	A
World Grand Prix	Tournament Not Held						DNQ	DNQ	DNQ	DNQ
Shoot Out	Tournament Not Held						NR	A	3R	1R
German Masters (Note: The event was called the German Open (1997/1998))	A	Tournament Not Held					LQ	A	A	A
Welsh Open	A	A	A	LQ	A	LQ	1R	A	A	A
Players Championship (Note: The event was called the Players Tour Championship Grand Final (2015/2016))	Tournament Not Held						DNQ	DNQ	DNQ	DNQ
WST Classic	Tournament Not Held									1R
Tour Championship	Tournament Not Held								DNQ	DNQ
World Championship	LQ	LQ	LQ	LQ	LQ	LQ	LQ	A	LQ	A
Non-ranking tournaments
The Masters	LQ	A	A	A	LQ	LQ	A	A	A	A
Former ranking tournaments
Thailand Masters	A	A	A	LQ	NR	Tournament Not Held				
Irish Masters	Non-Ranking Event				A	LQ	Tournament Not Held			
Shanghai Masters	Tournament Not Held						LQ	A	NR	NH
Riga Masters	Tournament Not Held						MR	A	1R	NH
World Open (Note: The event was called the Grand Prix (1997/1998–2000/2001))	A	A	A	LQ	A	LQ	NH	A	LQ	NH
Paul Hunter Classic	Tournament Not Held						MR	LQ	1R	NH
International Championship	Tournament Not Held						LQ	A	A	NH
Indian Open	Tournament Not Held							A	2R	NH
China Open (Note: The event was called the China International (1997/1998))	NR	A	A	LQ	Not Held		A	A	A	NH

Performance Table Legend
LQ	lost in the qualifying draw	#R	lost in the early rounds of the tournament (WR = Wildcard round, RR = Round robin)	QF	lost in the quarter-finals
SF	lost in the semi-finals	F	lost in the final	W	won the tournament
DNQ	did not qualify for the tournament	A	did not participate in the tournament	WD	withdrew from the tournament

NH / Not Held	means an event was not held.
NR / Non-Ranking Event	means an event is/was no longer a ranking event.
R / Ranking Event	means an event is/was a ranking event.
MR / Minor-Ranking Event	means an event is/was a minor-ranking event.
PA / Pro-am Event	means an event is/was a pro-am event.

== Career finals ==
=== Non-ranking finals: 2 ===
Outcome	No.	Year	Championship	Opponent in the final	Score
Runner-up	1.	2001	Challenge Tour - Event 4	(England) Shaun Murphy	2–6
Runner-up	2.	2003	Challenge Tour - Event 3	(England) Michael Rhodes	5–6

=== Pro-am finals: 2 (1 title) ===
Outcome	No.	Year	Championship	Opponent in the final	Score
Runner-up	1.	1999	Pontins Spring Open	(Republic of Ireland) John Gallagher	4–7
Winner	1.	2001	Pontins Spring Open	(England) Brian Morgan	7–5

=== Amateur finals: 9 (5 titles) ===
Outcome	No.	Year	Championship	Opponent in the final	Score
Runner-up	1.	1997	English Open	(England) Mark Gray	4–8
Winner	1.	1998	IBSF World Under-21 Snooker Championship	(Republic of Ireland) Robert Murphy	11–2
Winner	2.	1998	IBSF World Snooker Championship	(Wales) Ryan Day	11–10
Runner-up	2.	2018	Challenge Tour – Event 1	(England) Brandon Sargeant	1–3
Runner-up	3.	2021	EPSB Open Series - Event 2 (Breakers)	(England) Jenson Kendrick	1–3
Winner	3.	2021	EPSB Open Series - Event 6 (Breakers)	(Australia) Ryan Thomerson	3–0
Runner-up	4.	2021	EPSB Open Series - Event 7 (Breakers)	(England) Ryan Davies	2–3
Winner	4.	2021	EPSB Open Series - Event 8 (Breakers)	(England) Andy Marriott	3–0
Winner	5.	2021	EPSB Open Series - Event 9 (Breakers)	(England) Chae Ross	3–2
