= 2018–19 Challenge Tour =

Series of snooker tournaments

Details
- Duration: 2 June 2018 – 7 March 2019
- Tournaments: 10

The Challenge Tour 2018/2019 was a series of snooker tournaments that took place during the 2018–19 season. It was a second-tier tour for players not on the main World Snooker Tour. The top two players in the final rankings earned a two-year card to the World Snooker Tour for 2019–20.

Brandon Sargeant was certain of his place in the top two even before the final event. Prior to the draw for the final event, Sargeant led the rankings and only David Grace and Mitchell Mann could catch him. Sargeant could only drop to third if both Grace and Mann reached the final. However, when Grace and Mann were drawn in the same half of the draw, Sargeant was guaranteed his place in the top two. Grace guaranteed his place in the top two after his two nearest challengers, Mann and David Lilley, both lost on the first day of the final event.

After the season had been finished, additional places became available on the main tour for 2019/2020 season and it was decided that an extra tour place would be given to the third placed player on the ranking list, Mitchell Mann.

== Format ==
Each event had a maximum field of 64. The leading 64 players in the 2018 Q School Order of Merit, excluding the 12 who qualified for the main tour, were automatically eligible to play. If some of these did not enter, eight wildcards became eligible and if there are still less than 64 entries, players outside the top-64 in the Q School Order of Merit could enter.

All matches were over five frames. The winner of each event received prize money of £2,000 out of a total of £10,000. The runner-up received £1,000, semi-finalists £700, quarter-finalists £500, last-16 losers £200 and last-32 losers £125.

== Schedule ==
| Date | | Country | Tournament | Venue | City | Field | Winner | Runner-up | Score | Ref. |
|---|---|---|---|---|---|---|---|---|---|---|
| 2 June | 3 June | ENG | Event 1 | Meadowside Leisure Centre | Burton upon Trent | 59 | (England) Brandon Sargeant | (England) Luke Simmonds | 3–1 | |
| 10 July | 11 July | ENG | Event 2 | Preston Guild Hall | Preston | 64 | (England) David Grace | (England) Mitchell Mann | 3–0 | |
| 28 July | 28 July | LAT | Event 3 | Arena Riga | Riga | 25 | (England) Barry Pinches | (Wales) Jackson Page | 3–2 | |
| 27 Aug | 28 Aug | GER | Event 4 | Stadthalle | Fürth | 42 | (England) Mitchell Mann | (Wales) Dylan Emery | 3–0 | |
| 18 Sep | 19 Sep | ENG | Event 5 | Cueball Derby | Derby | 61 | (England) David Lilley | (England) Brandon Sargeant | 3–1 | |
| 4 Oct | 5 Oct | BEL | Event 6 | De Soeverein | Lommel | 40 | (England) David Grace | (England) Ben Hancorn | 3–0 | |
| 13 Oct | 14 Oct | ENG | Event 7 | Barnsley Metrodome | Barnsley | 61 | (England) Joel Walker | (England) Jenson Kendrick | 3–0 | |
| 24 Nov | 25 Nov | HUN | Event 8 | Snooker Terminál | Budapest | 44 | (England) Simon Bedford | (England) David Lilley | 3–1 | |
| 26 Jan | 27 Jan | ENG | Event 9 | Star Snooker Academy | Sheffield | 56 | (England) Adam Duffy | (England) Matthew Glasby | 3–1 | |
| 6 Mar | 7 Mar | ENG | Event 10 | South West Snooker Academy | Gloucester | 54 | (England) George Pragnell | (Wales) Callum Lloyd | 3–2 | |

The event at Riga was planned for two days, but with only 25 entries, it was played in a single day.

== Rankings ==
The leaders in the rankings were:

| Rank | Player | Event 1 | Event 2 | Event 3 | Event 4 | Event 5 | Event 6 | Event 7 | Event 8 | Event 9 | Event 10 | Total (£) |
|---|---|---|---|---|---|---|---|---|---|---|---|---|
| 1 | (England) Brandon Sargeant | 2,000 | 700 | 700 | 200 | 1,000 | 125 | 700 | 500 | 700 | 0 | 6,625 |
| 2 | (England) David Grace | 700 | 2,000 | 200 | 500 | 125 | 2,000 | 125 | 125 | 0 | 700 | 6,475 |
| 3 | (England) Mitchell Mann | 700 | 1,000 | 500 | 2,000 | 500 | 500 | 125 | 200 | 200 | 125 | 5,850 |
| 4 | (England) David Lilley | 200 | – | – | – | 2,000 | – | 500 | 1,000 | 500 | 200 | 4,400 |
| 5 | (England) Barry Pinches | 0 | 0 | 2,000 | 125 | 500 | 125 | 700 | 125 | 0 | 500 | 4,075 |

Players in the qualifying places are shown in green. Initially two qualifying places were available but a third place was allocated after the end of the season.
