= David Lilley (snooker player) =

English snooker player

Personal information
- Born: 19 October 1975 (age 51) Washington, Tyne and Wear

Sport
- Country: England
- Sport: Snooker
- Professional: 2019–2021, 2022–present
- Highest ranking: 51 (November 2025)
- Current ranking: 58 (as of 7 November 2026)
- Best ranking finish: Last 8 (x2)

David Lilley (born 19 October 1975) is an English professional snooker player. He turned professional in 2019, after 30 years as an amateur.

Lilley is from Washington in Sunderland, and is a supporter of Newcastle United F.C.

== Career ==
Lilley began playing snooker at the age of 13. His first big success was his victory at the (amateur) European Championships in 1995, defeating his compatriot David Gray 8–7. In the same year, he lost to Paul Hunter in the final of the Northern Amateur championship. In 1997, he reached the final of the English Amateur Championship for the first time and won it with a score of 8–7 against Robert Marshall. However, unable to find sponsorship in the wake of the sport's ban on tobacco advertising, and with only around six tournaments a year at that point, he felt he could not afford to turn professional and so remained an amateur.

In 1999, he won by an 8–5 victory in the final against Andrew Norman. In the same year, he reached the semifinals of the Amateur European Championships and the final of the World Amateur Snooker Championship, in which he was defeated by Ian Preece 11–8.

In 2000, he lost the final of the English Amateur Championship, 5–8 against Nick Marsh.

In February 2002, he participated for the first time in qualifying for the World Snooker Championship, but lost in the second qualifying round against Timothy Paling.

In 2004, Lilley won the English Amateur Championship for a third time, with an 8–6 victory over Wayne Cooper in the final. In the 2004 World Amateur Snooker Championship, he was narrowly defeated in the semi-finals 6–8 by the eventual champion Mark Allen. In qualifying for the 2005 World Snooker Championship, he retired in the third round against Stuart Mann. In the English Amateur Championship 2007, he lost in the deciding frame of the final against Martin Gould by 7–8.

He participated in the Players Tour Championship 2012/2013 – Event 2 in August 2012 and lost in the first qualifying round against Ben Harrison.

Lilley tried to qualify for the main tour via the 2016 Q School. In the first tournament he reached the final of his group but then lost against Chen Zhe; in the second tournament he retired in the second round. Although he missed the qualification for the Main Tour, as 17th on the Q-School Order of Merit he could participate as a substitute for tournaments of the 2016–17 snooker season.

At the 2016 Indian Open, the second world ranking tournament of the season, he qualified for a ranking tournament for the first time. After defeating Tian Pengfei 4–3 in qualifying, he eliminated Mike Dunn, Mark Williams and Robert Milkins in the main round to reach the quarterfinals, where he lost to England's Shaun Murphy 2–4.

He was first on the 2018 Q School Order of Merit. In the 18/19 season, he just missed out on gaining a tour card for the 19/20 season numerous times; he was 4th on the challenge tour list, and lost 5–4 to Kacper Filipiak in the 2019 EBSA European Snooker Championship, where a win would have granted him a place on the tour.

Lilley beat Sean Maddocks 4–0 in the final qualifying round of the first event of the 2019 Q School, finally becoming a professional after 30 years as an amateur. While an amateur, he had worked in the insurance industry. Lilley later remarked that his timing was bad, as no sooner had he joined the professional tour then the COVID-19 pandemic led to the mass cancellation of tournaments.

On 9 May 2021, Lilley overcame Jimmy White 5–3 to become the World Seniors Champion, entitling him to play in the 2021 Champion of Champions tournament. On 7 January 2022, Lilley was runner up to Peter Lines in the 2022 UK Seniors Championship, losing 4–1 in the final.

After a successful 2023–2024 season - the best of his career in terms of ranking points - David finished the season ranked 64th, reaching the top 64 for the first time at the age of 48. In November 2025, at the age of 50 years-old, Lilley reached the last-32 for the first time at the UK Championship.

== Performance and rankings timeline ==
Tournament	2001/ 02	2004/ 05	2012/ 13	2016/ 17	2017/ 18	2018/ 19	2019/ 20		2020/ 21	2021/ 22	2022/ 23	2023/ 24	2024/ 25	2025/ 26	2026/ 27
Ranking (Note: It shows the ranking at the beginning of the season)	(Note: He was an amateur)						(Note: New players on the Main Tour don't have a ranking)		90		(Note: Players qualified One Year Ranking List started the season without ranking points)	69	64	57	60
Ranking tournaments
Championship League	Not Held		Non-Ranking Event						RR	2R	RR	RR	3R	2R	RR
China Open	A	A	A	A	A	LQ	Tournament Not Held								LQ
Wuhan Open	Tournament Not Held											LQ	2R	LQ	LQ
British Open	A	A	Tournament Not Held							2R	LQ	LQ	LQ	2R	LQ
English Open	Not Held			A	LQ	2R	1R		3R	LQ	LQ	1R	LQ	LQ	LQ
Shenzhen Open (Note: The event was called the Xi'an Grand Prix (2024/2025–2025/2026))	Tournament Not Held												1R	2R	LQ
Northern Ireland Open	Not Held			1R	A	2R	2R		1R	LQ	2R	LQ	LQ	1R	LQ
International Championship	Not Held		A	LQ	A	2R	LQ		Not Held			LQ	LQ	1R	1R
UK Championship	A	A	A	A	A	1R	1R		1R	1R	LQ	LQ	LQ	1R	
Shoot Out	Not Held		NR	A	2R	A	2R		1R	2R	3R	3R	2R	1R	
Scottish Open	A	Not Held		A	A	3R	1R		1R	2R	1R	LQ	2R	LQ	
German Masters	Not Held		A	A	A	LQ	LQ		LQ	LQ	LQ	2R	1R	LQ	LQ
Welsh Open	A	A	A	A	A	1R	1R		2R	LQ	2R	1R	LQ	1R	
World Grand Prix	Not Held			DNQ	DNQ	DNQ	DNQ		DNQ	DNQ	DNQ	DNQ	DNQ	DNQ	
Players Championship	Not Held		DNQ	DNQ	DNQ	DNQ	DNQ		DNQ	DNQ	DNQ	DNQ	DNQ	DNQ	
World Open (Note: The event was called the LG Cup (2001/2002) and Grand Prix (2004/2005))	A	A	A	A	A	1R	LQ		Not Held			3R	3R	1R	
Tour Championship	Tournament Not Held					DNQ	DNQ		DNQ	DNQ	DNQ	DNQ	DNQ	DNQ	
World Championship	LQ	LQ	A	A	A	LQ	LQ		LQ	LQ	LQ	LQ	LQ	LQ	
Non-ranking tournaments
Champion of Champions	Not Held			A	A	A	A		A	1R	A	A	A	A	
World Seniors Championship	Not Held		A	A	A	NH	A	A	W	SF	A	A	A	A	
Former ranking tournaments
Paul Hunter Classic (Note: The event was called the Grand Prix Fürth (2004/2005))	NH	PA	MR	1R	A	A	NR		Tournament Not Held						
Indian Open	Not Held			QF	A	A	Tournament Not Held								
Riga Masters	Not Held			A	A	1R	LQ		Tournament Not Held						
China Championship	Not Held			NR	A	A	LQ		Tournament Not Held						
WST Pro Series	Tournament Not Held								RR	Tournament Not Held					
Turkish Masters	Tournament Not Held									LQ	Tournament Not Held				
Gibraltar Open	Not Held			LQ	A	1R	2R		2R	2R	Tournament Not Held				
WST Classic	Tournament Not Held										1R	Tournament Not Held			
European Masters	A	A	NH	A	A	LQ	1R		WD	LQ	LQ	LQ	Not Held		
Saudi Arabia Masters	Tournament Not Held												2R	2R	NH
Former non-ranking tournaments
Six-red World Championship	Not Held		A	A	A	A	A		Not Held		LQ	Tournament Not Held			

Performance Table Legend
LQ	lost in the qualifying draw	#R	lost in the early rounds of the tournament (WR = Wildcard round, RR = Round robin)	QF	lost in the quarter-finals
SF	lost in the semi-finals	F	lost in the final	W	won the tournament
DNQ	did not qualify for the tournament	A	did not participate in the tournament	WD	withdrew from the tournament

NH / Not Held	means an event was not held.
NR / Non-Ranking Event	means an event is/was no longer a ranking event.
R / Ranking Event	means an event is/was a ranking event.
MR / Minor-Ranking Event	means an event is/was a minor-ranking event.
PA / Pro-am Event	means an event is/was a pro-am event.

== Career finals ==
=== Seniors finals: 2 (1 title) ===
Outcome	No.	Year	Championship	Opponent in the final	Score
Winner	1.	2021	World Seniors Championship	(England) Jimmy White	5–3
Runner-up	1.	2022	UK Seniors Championship	(England) Peter Lines	1–4

=== Amateur finals: 13 (6 titles) ===
Outcome	No.	Year	Championship	Opponent in the final	Score
Winner	1.	1995	EBSA European Snooker Championship	(England) David Gray	8–7
Runner-up	1.	1995	IBSF World Snooker Championship	(Thailand) Sakchai Sim-Ngam	7–11
Winner	2.	1997	English Amateur Championship	(England) Robert Marshall	8–7
Winner	3.	1999	English Amateur Championship (2)	(England) Andrew Norman	8–5
Runner-up	2.	1999	IBSF World Snooker Championship (2)	(Wales) Ian Preece	8–11
Runner-up	3.	2000	English Amateur Championship	(England) Nick Marsh	5–8
Winner	4.	2004	English Amateur Championship (3)	(England) Wayne Cooper	8–6
Runner-up	4.	2007	English Amateur Championship (2)	(England) Martin Gould	7–8
Runner-up	5.	2017	English Amateur Championship (3)	(England) Billy Joe Castle	7–10
Winner	5.	2018	Challenge Tour – Event 5	(England) Brandon Sargeant	3–1
Runner-up	6.	2018	Challenge Tour – Event 8	(England) Simon Bedford	1–3
Runner-up	7.	2019	EBSA European Snooker Championship	(Poland) Kacper Filipiak	4–5
Winner	6.	2021	Q Tour – Event 1	(China) Si Jiahui	5–1
