= 2018 Riga Masters =

Snooker tournament

Kaspersky Riga Masters
Tournament information
- Dates: 27–29 July 2018
- Venue: Arena Riga
- City: Riga
- Country: Latvia
- Organisation: World Snooker
- Format: Ranking event
- Total prize fund: £259,000
- Winner's share: £50,000
- Highest break: Liang Wenbo (CHN) (140)

Final
- Champion: Neil Robertson (AUS)
- Runner-up: Jack Lisowski (ENG)
- Score: 5–2

The 2018 Kaspersky Riga Masters was a professional ranking snooker tournament that took place between 27 and 29 July 2018 at the Arena Riga in Riga, Latvia. It was the first ranking event of the 2018/2019 season.

Ryan Day was the defending champion, however he lost 3–4 to Ali Carter in the last 64.

Liang Wenbo made the highest break of the tournament with 140 in the second round against Neil Robertson. Liang potted all blacks with reds during the break but this was not a maximum break as he potted 13th and 14th reds in the same shot.

Neil Robertson won the event for the second time in three years, winning his 14th ranking title, defeating Jack Lisowski 5–2 in the final. This was Lisowski's first ranking event final.

== Prize fund ==
The breakdown of prize money for this year is shown below:

- Winner: £50,000
- Runner-up: £25,000
- Semi-final: £15,000
- Quarter-final: £6,000
- Last 16: £4,000
- Last 32: £3,000
- Last 64: £1,500
- Highest break: £2,000
- Total: £259,000

The "rolling 147 prize" for a maximum break stood at £10,000

== Main draw ==
Last 64; Best of 7 frames
(Wales) Jamie Jones	4
(England) Rod Lawler	2
(England) Chris Wakelin	w/o
(England) Sam Craigie	w/d
(England) Robbie Williams	3
(Germany) Lukas Kleckers	4
(China) Xu Si	2
(England) Mark King	4
(China) Mei Xiwen	2
(Northern Ireland) Joe Swail	4
(England) Stuart Carrington	4
(Republic of Ireland) Fergal O'Brien	3
(England) David Lilley	0
(England) Shaun Murphy	4
(England) Nigel Bond	0
(China) Zhao Xintong	4
(Scotland) Scott Donaldson	4
(Finland) Robin Hull	3
(China) Zhou Yuelong	1
(England) Craig Steadman	4
(Norway) Kurt Maflin	2
(China) Liang Wenbo	4
(China) Li Yuan	2
(Australia) Neil Robertson	4
(England) Barry Hawkins	3
(China) Li Hang	4
(England) Ricky Walden	4
(England) Jimmy White	0
(Northern Ireland) Mark Allen	4
(England) Peter Lines	3
(England) Ali Carter	4
(Wales) Ryan Day	3
(Wales) Michael White	4
(England) David Gilbert	3
(England) Joe Perry	4
(England) Robert Milkins	3
(Scotland) Stephen Maguire	4
(Northern Ireland) Gerard Greene	1
(Wales) Lee Walker	1
(England) Joe O'Connor	4
(England) Luke Simmonds	0
(England) Kyren Wilson	4
(China) Niu Zhuang	0
(England) Simon Bedford	4
(China) Yan Bingtao	w/d
(England) Anthony Hamilton	w/o
(England) Liam Highfield	1
(England) Michael Holt	4
(China) Tian Pengfei	3
(Scotland) Graeme Dott	4
(England) Ashley Carty	4
(Scotland) Anthony McGill	2
(China) Xiao Guodong	1
(Hong Kong) Marco Fu	4
(England) Mark Davis	4
(Belgium) Luca Brecel	2
(England) Rory McLeod	0
(China) Zhang Yong	4
(Wales) Mark Williams	4
(England) Ben Woollaston	2
(England) Oliver Lines	4
(England) Alfie Burden	2
(England) Ian Burns	2
(England) Jack Lisowski	4

Last 32; Best of 7 frames
(Wales) Jamie Jones	0
(England) Chris Wakelin	4
(Germany) Lukas Kleckers	2
(England) Mark King	4
(Northern Ireland) Joe Swail	3
(England) Stuart Carrington	4
(England) Shaun Murphy	0
(China) Zhao Xintong	4
(Scotland) Scott Donaldson	3
(England) Craig Steadman	4
(China) Liang Wenbo	3
(Australia) Neil Robertson	4
(China) Li Hang	0
(England) Ricky Walden	4
(Northern Ireland) Mark Allen	4
(England) Ali Carter	2
(Wales) Michael White	1
(England) Joe Perry	4
(Scotland) Stephen Maguire	4
(England) Joe O'Connor	2
(England) Kyren Wilson	4
(England) Simon Bedford	2
(England) Anthony Hamilton	4
(England) Michael Holt	1
(Scotland) Graeme Dott	4
(England) Ashley Carty	0
(Hong Kong) Marco Fu	3
(England) Mark Davis	4
(China) Zhang Yong	4
(Wales) Mark Williams	3
(England) Oliver Lines	0
(England) Jack Lisowski	4

Last 16; Best of 7 frames
(England) Chris Wakelin	4
(England) Mark King	3
(England) Stuart Carrington	4
(China) Zhao Xintong	1
(England) Craig Steadman	2
(Australia) Neil Robertson	4
(England) Ricky Walden	4
(Northern Ireland) Mark Allen	2
(England) Joe Perry	0
(Scotland) Stephen Maguire	4
(England) Kyren Wilson	4
(England) Anthony Hamilton	2
(Scotland) Graeme Dott	4
(England) Mark Davis	0
(China) Zhang Yong	1
(England) Jack Lisowski	4

Quarter-finals; Best of 7 frames
(England) Chris Wakelin	2
(England) Stuart Carrington	4
(Australia) Neil Robertson	4
(England) Ricky Walden	2
(Scotland) Stephen Maguire	4
(England) Kyren Wilson	2
(Scotland) Graeme Dott	0
(England) Jack Lisowski	4

Semi-finals; Best of 9 frames
(England) Stuart Carrington	0
(Australia) Neil Robertson	5
(Scotland) Stephen Maguire	1
(England) Jack Lisowski	5

Final; Best of 9 frames
(Australia) Neil Robertson	5
(England) Jack Lisowski	2

== Final ==
Final: Best of 9 frames. Referee: Paul Collier. Arena Riga, Riga, Latvia, 29 July 2018.
Neil Robertson; Australia	5–2	Jack Lisowski; England
60–21, 73–59, 122–0 (117), 45–73, 81–66, 32–72, 72–37
117	Highest break	38
1	Century breaks	0

== Qualifying ==
These matches were held between 2 and 5 July 2018 at the Preston Guild Hall in Preston, England. All matches were the best of 7 frames.

(Germany) Simon Lichtenberg	0–4	(Wales) Jamie Jones
(England) Rod Lawler	4–0	(England) Martin O'Donnell
(England) Kuldesh Johal	2–4	(England) Chris Wakelin
(Malaysia) Thor Chuan Leong	w/d–w/o	(England) Sam Craigie
(England) Robbie Williams	4–3	(Scotland) Alan McManus
(Germany) Lukas Kleckers	4–1	(Switzerland) Alexander Ursenbacher
(England) Matthew Selt	3–4	(China) Xu Si
(England) Mark King	4–3	(England) Peter Ebdon
(Iran) Soheil Vahedi	1–4	(China) Mei Xiwen
(Northern Ireland) Joe Swail	4–1	(Thailand) Dechawat Poomjaeng
(England) Stuart Carrington	w/o–w/d	(England) Mitchell Mann
(Republic of Ireland) Fergal O'Brien	4–3	(Israel) Eden Sharav
(England) Hammad Miah	2–4	(England) David Lilley
(England) Shaun Murphy	4–2	(England) Sanderson Lam
(England) Nigel Bond	4–2	(England) Mark Joyce
(China) Zhao Xintong	4–0	(England) Jimmy Robertson
(Thailand) Noppon Saengkham	3–4	(Scotland) Scott Donaldson
(England) James Cahill	1–4	(Finland) Robin Hull
(Cyprus) Michael Georgiou	3–4	(China) Zhou Yuelong
(England) Craig Steadman	4–2	(China) Yuan Sijun
(Norway) Kurt Maflin	4–2	(China) Lyu Haotian
(China) Liang Wenbo	4–0	(England) Adam Duffy
(England) Paul Davison	1–4	(China) Li Yuan
(Australia) Neil Robertson	4–2	(China) Luo Honghao
(England) Barry Hawkins	4–0	(Hong Kong) Andy Lee
(China) Li Hang	4–2	(Wales) Duane Jones
(England) Ricky Walden	4–1	(England) John Astley
(Latvia) Rodion Judin	0–4 (Note: Match was held over and played in Riga.)	(England) Jimmy White
(Northern Ireland) Mark Allen	4–2	(Wales) Daniel Wells
(England) Peter Lines	4–2	(England) Shane Castle
(England) Billy Joe Castle	0–4	(England) Ali Carter
(England) Jamie Cope	w/d–w/o	(Wales) Ryan Day
(England) Gary Wilson	1–4	(Wales) Michael White
(England) David Gilbert	4–1	(England) Farakh Ajaib
(England) Joe Perry	4–1	(China) Lu Ning
(Wales) Jak Jones	2–4	(England) Robert Milkins
(Scotland) Stephen Maguire	4–0	(Republic of Ireland) Michael Judge
(Northern Ireland) Gerard Greene	4–1	(China) Chen Feilong
(Wales) Lee Walker	4–0	(Egypt) Basem Eltahhan
(Northern Ireland) Jordan Brown	1–4	(England) Joe O'Connor
(China) Zhang Jiankang	3–4	(England) Luke Simmonds
(England) Kyren Wilson	4–3	(Wales) Dominic Dale
(China) Niu Zhuang	4–0	(England) Stuart Bingham
(England) Mike Dunn	3–4	(England) Simon Bedford
(China) Yan Bingtao	4–1	(England) Martin Gould
(England) Anthony Hamilton	4–2	(Scotland) Chris Totten
(England) Liam Highfield	4–0	(England) Sean O'Sullivan
(England) Michael Holt	4–0	(Wales) Matthew Stevens
(China) Zhang Anda	3–4	(China) Tian Pengfei
(Scotland) Graeme Dott	4–0	(Latvia) Maris Volajs
(England) Harvey Chandler	1–4	(England) Ashley Carty
(Wales) Kishan Hirani	0–4	(Scotland) Anthony McGill
(China) Xiao Guodong	4–3	(England) Tom Ford
(England) Elliot Slessor	1–4	(Hong Kong) Marco Fu
(England) Andrew Higginson	2–4	(England) Mark Davis
(England) Allan Taylor	2–4	(Belgium) Luca Brecel
(England) Rory McLeod	4–3	(Poland) Adam Stefanow
(China) Zhang Yong	4–1	(Scotland) Ross Muir
(Scotland) Rhys Clark	w/d–w/o	(Wales) Mark Williams
(England) Ben Woollaston	4–0	(England) Sam Baird
(England) Oliver Lines	4–3	(Thailand) Sunny Akani
(China) Chen Zifan	2–4	(England) Alfie Burden
(Wales) Jamie Clarke	3–4	(England) Ian Burns
(China) Fan Zhengyi	1–4	(England) Jack Lisowski

== Century breaks ==
=== Televised stage centuries ===
Total: 31

- 140, 110 – Liang Wenbo
- 133 – Peter Lines
- 128, 122, 115, 115 – Zhao Xintong
- 125, 104, 101 – Joe Perry
- 122 – Marco Fu
- 121 – Jamie Jones
- 120 – Shaun Murphy
- 120 – Zhang Yong
- 117, 114, 113, 110, 110, 101 – Neil Robertson
- 115 – Fergal O'Brien
- 115 – Chris Wakelin
- 114 – Alfie Burden
- 110, 109 – Stuart Carrington
- 110 – Ben Woollaston
- 106 – Mark King
- 105 – Kyren Wilson
- 103 – Ricky Walden
- 102 – Stephen Maguire
- 101 – Jack Lisowski

=== Qualifying stage centuries ===
Total: 18

- 140 – Michael White
- 137 – Scott Donaldson
- 137 – Li Yuan
- 137 – Noppon Saengkham
- 133 – Kurt Maflin
- 123, 107 – Neil Robertson
- 118, 111 – David Lilley
- 112 – Mark Joyce
- 109 – Tom Ford
- 107 – Rod Lawler
- 106 – Ali Carter
- 106 – Stephen Maguire
- 105 – Liang Wenbo
- 104 – Mark Davis
- 102 – Yan Bingtao
- 100 – Zhang Jiankang
