= 2021–22 snooker season =

Series of snooker tournaments

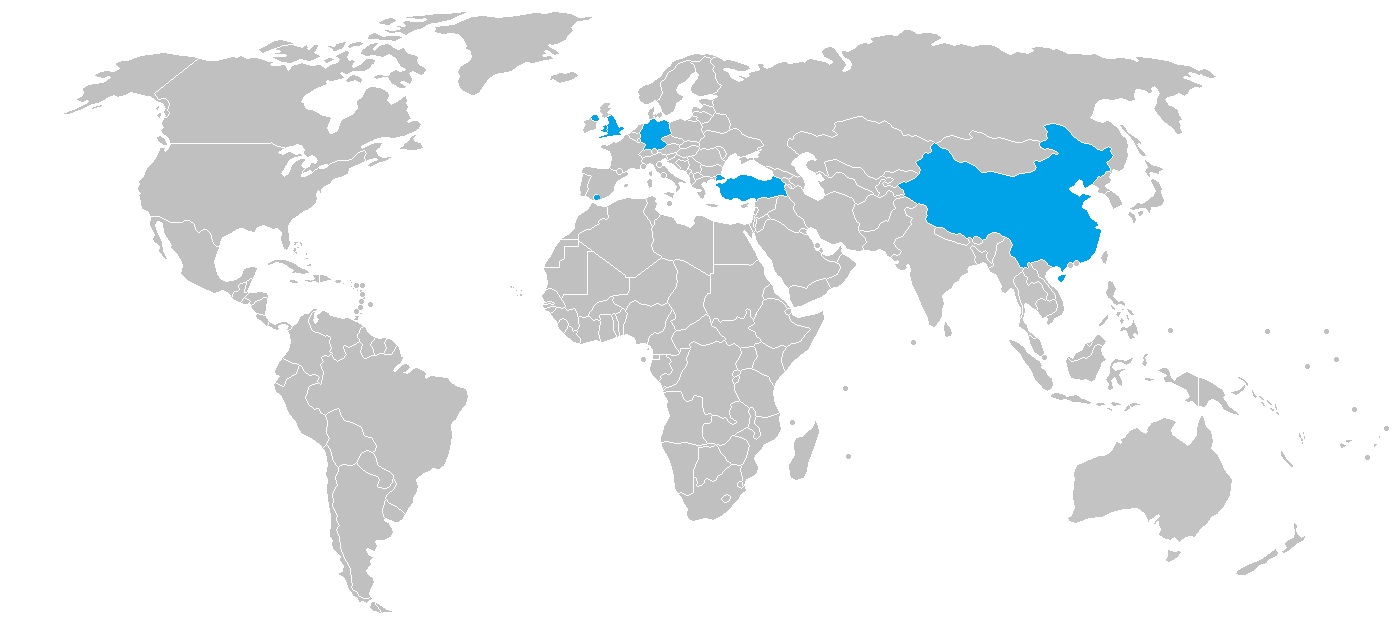
- Nations that hosted an event in the snooker calendar during the 2021–22 season

Details
- Duration: 18 July 2021 – 11 May 2022
- Tournaments: 32 (16 ranking events)

Triple Crown winners
- UK Championship: Zhao Xintong (CHN)
- Masters: Neil Robertson (AUS)
- World Championship: Ronnie O'Sullivan (ENG)

The 2021–22 snooker season was a series of snooker tournaments played from July 2021 to May 2022, including the professional World Snooker Tour but also featuring events for female, senior, and Q School players. The season saw a record five players claim their first professional ranking titles: David Gilbert, Zhao Xintong, Hossein Vafaei, Fan Zhengyi, and Robert Milkins. Nutcharut Wongharuthai won her first World Women's Snooker Championship, becoming the only player besides Reanne Evans and Ng On-yee to win the women's world title in 19 years. Ronnie O'Sullivan won the World Snooker Championship, equalling Stephen Hendry's modern era record of seven world titles and becoming the oldest world champion in snooker history at the age of 46 years and 148 days. Lee Walker won his first World Seniors Championship.

Neil Robertson, who won four tournaments during the season, was named Player of the Year at the World Snooker Tour Awards. O'Sullivan was named the Snooker Journalists' Player of the Year, while Zhao was the Fans' Player of the Year. O'Sullivan won Performance of the Year for capturing his seventh world title, while Robertson won Magic Moment of the Year for making a maximum break at the Crucible. Evans and Allison Fisher were entered into the Snooker Hall of Fame for outstanding contributions to the growth of snooker.

== Players ==
The World Snooker Tour in the 2021–22 season consists of a field of 122 professional players. The top 64 players from the prize money rankings after the 2021 World Championship, and 27 of the players who earned a two-year tour card the previous year automatically qualified for the season. Next, eight places were allocated to the top eight on the One Year Ranking List who had not already qualified for the Main Tour. Another four players came from the CBSA China Tour, and a further 14 places were eligible through the 2021 Q School, four from each of the three events and an additional two from the Order of Merit). Two players from the World Women's Snooker Tour were given tour cards. Andrew Pagett, who won the 2020 EBSA European Championship, had his tour card deferred to this season and was subsequently given a tour card. The last two tour cards were invitational tour cards, given to Marco Fu and Jimmy White.

=== New professional players ===
All players listed below received a tour card for two seasons.

Top 8 players from 2020/2021 One Year Ranking List

1. (China) Chang Bingyu
2. (Brazil) Igor Figueiredo
3. (China) Xu Si
4. (England) Louis Heathcote
5. (China) Chen Zifan
6. (England) Jamie O'Neill
7. (England) Andy Hicks
8. (Northern Ireland) Gerard Greene

CBSA China Tour

9. (China) Wu Yize
10. (China) Zhang Jiankang
11. (China) Cao Yupeng
12. (China) Zhang Anda

World Women's Snooker Tour

13. (England) Reanne Evans
14. (Hong Kong) Ng On-yee

Deferred Tour Place

15. (Wales) Andrew Pagett

Invitational Tour Card

16. (Hong Kong) Marco Fu
17. (England) Jimmy White

Q School

Main article: 2021 Q School

Event 1

18. (England) Peter Lines
19. (Scotland) Fraser Patrick
20. (Wales) Jackson Page
21. (China) Yuan Sijun

Event 2

22. (England) Barry Pinches
23. (England) Craig Steadman
24. (Republic of Ireland) Michael Judge
25. (England) Alfie Burden

Event 3

26. (England) Ian Burns
27. (China) Lei Peifan
28. (Scotland) Dean Young
29. (Wales) Duane Jones

Order of Merit – Top 2

30. (England) Hammad Miah
31. (England) Mitchell Mann

=== Top-up players ===
As a result of the COVID-19 pandemic restricting the number of amateur qualification tournaments that could be run and thus the total size of the Main Tour for this season, World Snooker Tour announced that the following six players were guaranteed an invite to all eligible snooker events this season, alongside amateurs appointed by local governing bodies for the Home Nations Series. This was due to their ranking on the Q School Order of Merit:

- (England) Sanderson Lam
- (Cyprus) Michael Georgiou
- (China) Si Jiahui
- (Iran) Soheil Vahedi
- (Wales) Michael White
- (England) David Lilley

== Calendar ==
The following tables outline the dates and results for all the World Snooker Tour, World Women's Snooker Tour, World Seniors Tour, Q Tour, and other events in the season.

=== World Snooker Tour ===
Start	Finish	Tournament	Venue	Winner	Score	Runner-up	Ref.
18 Jul	13 Aug	Championship League	Morningside Arena in Leicester, England	David Gilbert (ENG)	3‍–‍1	Mark Allen (NIR)	
16 Aug	22 Aug	British Open	Morningside Arena in Leicester, England	Mark Williams (WAL)	6‍–‍4	Gary Wilson (ENG)	
9 Oct	17 Oct	Northern Ireland Open	Waterfront Hall in Belfast, Northern Ireland	Mark Allen (NIR)	9‍–‍8	John Higgins (SCO)	
1 Nov	7 Nov	English Open	Marshall Arena in Milton Keynes, England	Neil Robertson (AUS)	9‍–‍8	John Higgins (SCO)	
15 Nov	21 Nov	Champion of Champions^{†}	Bolton Whites Hotel in Bolton, England	Judd Trump (ENG)	10‍–‍4	John Higgins (SCO)	
23 Nov	5 Dec	UK Championship	York Barbican in York, England	Zhao Xintong (CHN)	10‍–‍5	Luca Brecel (BEL)	
6 Dec	12 Dec	Scottish Open	Venue Cymru in Llandudno, Wales	Luca Brecel (BEL)	9‍–‍5	John Higgins (SCO)	
13 Dec	19 Dec	World Grand Prix	Coventry Building Society Arena in Coventry, England	Ronnie O'Sullivan (ENG)	10‍–‍8	Neil Robertson (AUS)	
9 Jan	16 Jan	Masters^{†}	Alexandra Palace in London, England	Neil Robertson (AUS)	10‍–‍4	Barry Hawkins (ENG)	
20 Jan	23 Jan	Shoot Out	Morningside Arena in Leicester, England	Hossein Vafaei (IRN)	1‍–‍0	Mark Williams (WAL)	
26 Jan	30 Jan	German Masters	Tempodrom in Berlin, Germany	Zhao Xintong (CHN)	9‍–‍0	Yan Bingtao (CHN)	
20 Dec	4 Feb	Championship League Invitational^{†}	Morningside Arena in Leicester, England	John Higgins (SCO)	3‍–‍2	Stuart Bingham (ENG)	
7 Feb	13 Feb	Players Championship	Aldersley Leisure Village in Wolverhampton, England	Neil Robertson (AUS)	10‍–‍5	Barry Hawkins (ENG)	
21 Feb	27 Feb	European Masters	Marshall Arena in Milton Keynes, England	Fan Zhengyi (CHN)	10‍–‍9	Ronnie O'Sullivan (ENG)	
28 Feb	6 Mar	Welsh Open	ICC Wales, Celtic Manor Resort in Newport, Wales	Joe Perry (ENG)	9‍–‍5	Judd Trump (ENG)	
7 Mar	13 Mar	Turkish Masters	Nirvana Cosmopolitan Hotel in Antalya, Turkey	Judd Trump (ENG)	10‍–‍4	Matthew Selt (ENG)	
24 Mar	26 Mar	Gibraltar Open	Europa Point Sports Complex in Gibraltar, Gibraltar	Robert Milkins (ENG)	4‍–‍2	Kyren Wilson (ENG)	
28 Mar	3 Apr	Tour Championship	Venue Cymru in Llandudno, Wales	Neil Robertson (AUS)	10‍–‍9	John Higgins (SCO)	
16 Apr	2 May	World Championship	Crucible Theatre in Sheffield, England	Ronnie O'Sullivan (ENG)	18‍–‍13	Judd Trump (ENG)	

Ranking event
^{†} Non-ranking event

European Series champion and Betvictor bonus winner: John Higgins (SCO)

=== World Women's Snooker ===
Start	Finish	Tournament	Venue	Winner	Score	Runner-up	Ref.
4 Sep	5 Sep	UK Women's Championship	Northern Snooker Centre in Leeds, England	Reanne Evans (ENG)	4‍–‍0	Rebecca Kenna (ENG)	
27 Nov	28 Nov	Eden Women's Masters	Frames Sports Bar in London, England	Ng On-yee (HKG)	4‍–‍3	Reanne Evans (ENG)	
15 Jan	16 Jan	Women's British Open	The Winchester in Leicester, England	Nutcharut Wongharuthai (THA)	4‍–‍3	Reanne Evans (ENG)	
11 Feb	14 Feb	World Women's Championship	Ding Junhui Snooker Academy in Sheffield, England	Nutcharut Wongharuthai (THA)	6‍–‍5	Wendy Jans (BEL)	
2 Apr	3 Apr	Winchester Women's Open	The Winchester in Leicester, England	Ng On-yee (HKG)	4‍–‍0	Nutcharut Wongharuthai (THA)	

=== World Seniors Tour ===
Start	Finish	Tournament	Venue	Winner	Score	Runner-up	Ref.
4 Jan	7 Jan	UK Seniors Championship	Bonus Arena in Hull, England	Peter Lines (ENG)	4‍–‍1	David Lilley (ENG)	
4 May	8 May	World Seniors Championship	Crucible Theatre in Sheffield, England	Lee Walker (WAL)	5‍–‍4	Jimmy White (ENG)	

=== Q Tour ===
Start	Finish	Tournament	Venue	Winner	Score	Runner-up	Ref.
19 Nov	21 Nov	Q Tour 1	Castle Snooker Club in Brighton, England	David Lilley (ENG)	5‍–‍1	Si Jiahui (CHN)	
10 Dec	12 Dec	Q Tour 2	Terry Griffiths Matchroom in Llanelli, Wales	Si Jiahui (CHN)	5‍–‍4	Michael White (WAL)	
28 Jan	30 Jan	Q Tour 3	The Winchester in Leicester, England	Sean O'Sullivan (ENG)	5‍–‍2	Julien Leclercq (BEL)	
18 Mar	20 Mar	Q Tour 4	Northern Snooker Centre in Leeds, England	Robbie McGuigan (NIR)	5‍–‍3	Michael Collumb (SCO)	
10 May	11 May	Q Tour Playoff	Q House Snooker Academy in Darlington, England	Julien Leclercq (BEL)	5‍–‍2	Alex Clenshaw (ENG)	

=== Other events ===
Start	Finish	Tournament	Venue	Winner	Score	Runner-up	Ref.
25 Sep	29 Sep	Haining Open	Haining Sports Center in Haining, China	He Guoqiang (CHN)	5‍–‍0	Huang Jiahao (CHN)	

== World ranking points ==
The 2021–22 snooker season will feature the following points distribution for World Snooker Tour ranking events:

Round Tournament	R144	R128	R112	R96	R80	R64	R48	R32	R24	R16	QF	R6	SF	F	W
Championship League	—N/a	0 (Note: First stage fourth-placed)	—N/a	1,000 (Note: First stage third-placed)	—N/a	2,000 (Note: First stage runner-up)	—N/a	4,000 (Note: Second stage fourth-placed)	5,000 (Note: Second stage third-placed)	6,000 (Note: Second stage runner-up)	8,000 (Note: Third stage fourth-placed)	9,000 (Note: Third stage third-placed)	11,000 (Note: Third stage runner-up)	23,000	33,000
British Open	—N/a	0	—N/a	—N/a	—N/a	3,000	—N/a	5,000	—N/a	7,000	12,000	—N/a	20,000	45,000	100,000
Northern Ireland Open	—N/a	0	—N/a	—N/a	—N/a	3,000	—N/a	4,000	—N/a	7,500	10,000	—N/a	20,000	30,000	70,000
English Open	—N/a	0	—N/a	—N/a	—N/a	3,000	—N/a	4,000	—N/a	7,500	10,000	—N/a	20,000	30,000	70,000
UK Championship	—N/a	0	—N/a	—N/a	—N/a	6,500	—N/a	12,000	—N/a	17,000	24,500	—N/a	40,000	80,000	200,000
Scottish Open	—N/a	0	—N/a	—N/a	—N/a	3,000	—N/a	4,000	—N/a	7,500	10,000	—N/a	20,000	30,000	70,000
World Grand Prix	—N/a	—N/a	—N/a	—N/a	—N/a	—N/a	—N/a	5,000	—N/a	7,500	12,000	—N/a	20,000	40,000	100,000
Shoot Out	—N/a	0	—N/a	—N/a	—N/a	500	—N/a	1,000	—N/a	2,000	4,000	—N/a	8,000	20,000	50,000
German Masters	—N/a	0	—N/a	—N/a	—N/a	3,000 (Note: Loss in second qualifying round)	—N/a	4,000	—N/a	5,000	10,000	—N/a	20,000	35,000	80,000
Players Championship	—N/a	—N/a	—N/a	—N/a	—N/a	—N/a	—N/a	—N/a	—N/a	10,000	15,000	—N/a	30,000	50,000	125,000
European Masters	—N/a	0	—N/a	—N/a	—N/a	3,000	—N/a	4,000	—N/a	6,000	11,000	—N/a	17,500	35,000	80,000
Welsh Open	—N/a	0	—N/a	—N/a	—N/a	3,000	—N/a	4,000	—N/a	7,500	10,000	—N/a	20,000	30,000	70,000
Turkish Masters	—N/a	0	—N/a	—N/a	—N/a	3,500	—N/a	5,500	—N/a	7,500	12,500	—N/a	20,000	45,000	100,000
Gibraltar Open	—N/a	0	—N/a	—N/a	—N/a	2,000	—N/a	3,000	—N/a	4,000	5,000	—N/a	6,000	20,000	50,000
Tour Championship	—N/a	—N/a	—N/a	—N/a	—N/a	—N/a	—N/a	—N/a	—N/a	—N/a	20,000	—N/a	40,000	60,000	150,000
World Championship	0	—N/a	5,000 (Note: Players who lose their first match receive no ranking points.)	—N/a	10,000	—N/a	15,000	20,000	—N/a	30,000	50,000	—N/a	100,000	200,000	500,000
