= 2011 Brazil Masters =

Brazil Masters

Tournament information
- Dates: 15–18 September 2011
- Venue: Costão do Santinho Resort
- City: Florianópolis
- Country: Brazil
- Organisation: WPBSA
- Format: Non-ranking event
- Total prize fund: $200,000
- Winner's share: $40,000
- Highest break: 139

Final
- Champion: (England) Shaun Murphy
- Runner-up: (Scotland) Graeme Dott
- Score: 5–0

The 2011 Brazil Masters was a professional non-ranking snooker tournament that took place between 15 and 18 September 2011 at Costão do Santinho Resort in Florianópolis, Brazil.

Shaun Murphy won in the final 5–0 against Graeme Dott.

== Prize fund ==
The breakdown of prize money for this year is shown below:

- Winner: $40,000
- Runner-up: $20,000
- Semi-final: $11,000
- Quarter-final: $7,000
- Last 16: $4,000
- Appearance fee for 14 professionals: $4,000
- Highest break: $2,000
- Total: $200,000

== Main draw ==
Last 16; Best of 7 frames
(England) Mark Selby	4
(England) Stuart Bingham	3
(England) Peter Ebdon	4
(England) Stephen Lee	1
(England) Jamie Cope	2
(Brazil) Igor Figueiredo	4
(Scotland) Graeme Dott	4
(England) Mark Davis	1
(England) Shaun Murphy	4
(Brazil) Sobradinho de Deus	0
(England) Martin Gould	1
(England) Ricky Walden	4
(Scotland) Stephen Hendry	4
(Brazil) Noel Rodrigues	1
(England) Ali Carter	4
(England) Steve Davis	2

Quarter-finals; Best of 7 frames
(England) Mark Selby	3
(England) Peter Ebdon	4
(Brazil) Igor Figueiredo	2
(Scotland) Graeme Dott	4
(England) Shaun Murphy	4
(England) Ricky Walden	1
(Scotland) Stephen Hendry	4
(England) Ali Carter	0

Semi-finals; Best of 9 frames
(England) Peter Ebdon	2
(Scotland) Graeme Dott	5
(England) Shaun Murphy	5
(Scotland) Stephen Hendry	1

Final; Best of 9 frames
(Scotland) Graeme Dott	0
(England) Shaun Murphy	5

== Final ==
Final: Best of 9 frames. Referee: Michaela Tabb. Costão do Santinho Resort, Florianópolis, Brazil, 18 September 2011
Graeme Dott; Scotland	0–5	Shaun Murphy; England
4–93 (81), 35–84, 21–72 (54), 0–79 (79), 0–139 (139)
30	Highest break	139
0	Century breaks	1
0	50+ breaks	4

== Century breaks ==
- 139, 111 Shaun Murphy
- 114 Igor Figueiredo
- 113 Stephen Hendry
