= Igor Figueiredo =

Brazilian snooker player (born 1977)

Personal information
- Nickname: T-Igor
- Born: October 11, 1977 (age 49) Rio de Janeiro, Brazil

Sport
- Country: Brazil
- Sport: Snooker
- Professional: 2010–2012, 2013–2017, 2019–2022, 2026–present
- Highest ranking: 65 (September 2010)
- Current ranking: 127 (as of 4 October 2026)
- Best ranking finish: Last 16 (x3)

Igor Almeida Figueiredo (born October 11, 1977) is a Brazilian professional snooker player. As an amateur, Figueiredo entered the International Open Series (PIOS) tour in 2009 finishing 12th at year end. The same year, he was a finalist at the IBSF World Championship, earning himself a wild card entry onto the main tour for 2010. He went on to play as a professional from 2010 to 2017 but was relegated from the tour at the end of the 2017 season.

Since his relegation, Figueiredo has competed in the World Seniors Tour. He was a runner-up in the UK Seniors Championship in 2018 and the winner of the World Seniors Championship in 2024, meeting Ken Doherty in the final on both occasions. By winning the tournament in 2024, Figueiredo qualified for the 2024 Champion of Champions tournament.

In September 2025, he won the Pan American Open Snooker Championship for the second time and thereby secured his return to the tour from the 2026–27 season onwards.

== Career ==
=== Amateur career ===
Prior to entering the International Open Series (PIOS) tour in 2009, Figueiredo had only played on 10-foot tables in his home country. Despite this, his results were impressive, allowing him to finish 12th on the year-end ranking list. Figueiredo's most significant achievement, however, came at the 2009 IBSF World Championship, as he enjoyed a spectacular run to the final. Although he lost 10–8 to experienced Alfie Burden, he was given a wild card by WPBSA onto the main tour for 2010/2011.

=== 2010–2012 ===
In his first professional tournament, the minor-ranking PTC Event 1, Figueiredo won two matches to reach the last 32. He went further in the Event 3, losing a decider to Barry Hawkins in the last 16. At the Shanghai Masters, Figueiredo beat Jamie O'Neill 5–4 and David Gilbert 5–4 (despite being docked a frame for forgetting his cue). His run ended in the last 64 losing 5–1 to Fergal O'Brien. He also qualified for the televised stages of the World Open, losing 0–3 in the third round to Mark Williams. From this point however, Figueiredo started to struggle for form, losing all his opening matches at the major tournaments. Thanks to his strong performances at the PTC events he was able to retain his tour card for the 2011/12 season, despite finishing only 80th in the world rankings.

Due to the lack of sponsorship Figueiredo only entered qualifying for one ranking event of the next season, the 2012 World Championship, where he won three matches, before losing 7–10 to Joe Jogia. He also participated in the inaugural Brazil Masters and defeated world number 17 Jamie Cope in the first round 4–2, but then lost by the same scoreline to Graeme Dott in the quarter-finals.

=== 2013–2017 ===
In 2013, Figueiredo returned to Main Tour after receiving the nomination from the Americas region, but the lack of sponsorship again forced him to sit out the whole season until the 2014 World Championship. He repeated his last 64 run of 2012 as he beat Adam Duffy 10–4 in the first qualifying round, and followed it with 10–8 win against Gerard Greene, but suffered a heavy 10–1 defeat to Martin Gould in the penultimate round. Figueiredo also took part in the snooker tournament at the 2013 World Games, where he lost 3–2 to Dechawat Poomjaeng in the bronze medal match.

Figueiredo finally managed to gain sponsorship before the 2014 UK Championship, and was able to enter all the remaining tournaments of the 2014/2015 season. At the UK Championship he defeated Fergal O'Brien 6–4 to reach the last 64, where he lost 6–4 to Anthony McGill. He repeated this result at the German Masters qualifying by beating Kurt Maflin 5–3, before Stuart Bingham defeated him 5–1. Figueiredo went on to lose his opening match at each of the next three ranking tournaments, but enjoyed another strong run at the World Championship qualifiers. He started with a 10–3 win against veteran Nigel Bond, and followed that with a dramatic 10–9 victory over Rod Lawler, in a match where Figueiredo led 8–2 and 9–5, to reach the final round, where he lost 10–4 to Robin Hull.

Figueiredo was able to stay on the tour, as he was issued an International Development Main Tour Card as the Brazilian National Champion. He again had to sit out most of the season up to the 2016 World Championship where he was defeated 10–2 by Matthew Selt in the first qualifying round.

In the latter part of the 2016/2017 season Figueiredo had his best finishes on the tour to date. At the Welsh Open he secured wins over Alfie Burden, Anthony McGill and Dominic Dale, before falling 4–1 to Stuart Carrington. He also reached the fourth round of the Gibraltar Open by eliminating Sydney Wilson, Fraser Patrick and Thor Chuan Leong and lost 4–2 to Nigel Bond. He was relegated from the tour at the end of the year though due to being ranked 111th in the world.

=== 2022-23 ===
Figueiredo had moved back to Brazil in 2021 during the COVID-19 pandemic and had not competed in any events since. In the 2022-23 season, he chose not to renew his membership of the WPBSA and was removed from the world rankings during the 2022 European Masters.

=== World Seniors Tour ===
Since being relegated from the main professional tour, Figueiredo has competed in the World Seniors Tour. He was runner-up in the UK Seniors Championship in 2018 and winner of the World Seniors Championship in 2024, meeting Ken Doherty in the final on each occasion. By winning the tournament in 2024, beating Doherty 5‍–‍2 in the final, he qualified for the 2024 Champion of Champions tournament.

== Performance and rankings timeline ==
Tournament	2010/ 11	2011/ 12	2013/ 14	2014/ 15	2015/ 16	2016/ 17	2017/ 18	2018/ 19	2019/ 20	2020/ 21	2021/ 22	2023/ 24	2024/ 25	2025/ 26	2026/ 27
Ranking (Note: It shows the ranking at the beginning of the season)	(Note: New players on the Main Tour don't have a ranking)	75		109	(Note: Players issued an invitational tour card began the season without ranking points)	126	(Note: He was an amateur)			82	(Note: Players qualified One Year Ranking List started the season without ranking points)				
Ranking tournaments
Championship League	Non-Ranking Event									RR	RR	A	A	A	A
China Open	LQ	A	A	LQ	A	LQ	A	A	Tournament Not Held						A
Wuhan Open	Tournament Not Held											A	A	A	A
British Open	Tournament Not Held										1R	A	A	A	
English Open	Tournament Not Held					A	A	A	1R	1R	WD	A	A	A	
Shenzhen Open (Note: The event was called the Xi'an Grand Prix (2024/2025–2025/2026))	Tournament Not Held											A	A	A	
Northern Ireland Open	Tournament Not Held					1R	A	A	1R	4R	LQ	A	A	A	
International Championship	Not Held		A	A	A	A	A	A	A	Not Held		A	A	A	
UK Championship	LQ	A	A	2R	A	1R	A	A	1R	2R	A	A	LQ	LQ	
Shoot Out	Non-Ranking Event					1R	A	A	2R	WD	A	A	A	A	
Scottish Open	Tournament Not Held					2R	A	A	1R	1R	WD	A	A	A	
German Masters	LQ	A	A	LQ	A	LQ	A	A	LQ	LQ	WD	A	A	A	
Welsh Open	LQ	A	A	1R	A	4R	A	A	3R	1R	A	A	A	A	
World Grand Prix	Not Held			NR	DNQ	DNQ	DNQ	DNQ	DNQ	DNQ	DNQ	DNQ	DNQ	DNQ	
Players Championship (Note: The event was called the Players Tour Championship Grand Final (2010/2011–2011/2012 and 2013/2014–2015/2016))	DNQ	DNQ	DNQ	DNQ	DNQ	DNQ	DNQ	DNQ	DNQ	DNQ	DNQ	DNQ	DNQ	DNQ	
World Open	LQ	A	A	Not Held		A	A	A	1R	Not Held		A	A	A	
Tour Championship	Tournament Not Held							DNQ	DNQ	DNQ	DNQ	DNQ	DNQ	DNQ	
World Championship	LQ	LQ	LQ	LQ	LQ	LQ	LQ	LQ	LQ	LQ	A	A	A	A	
Non-ranking tournaments
Champion of Champions	Not Held		A	A	A	A	A	A	A	A	A	A	1R	A	
World Seniors Championship	A	A	A	A	A	A	A	NH	A	SF	A	W	1R	QF	
Former ranking tournaments
Shanghai Masters	LQ	A	A	A	A	A	A	Non-Ranking		Not Held		Non-Ranking Event			
Indian Open	Not Held		A	LQ	NH	A	A	A	Tournament Not Held						
China Championship	Tournament Not Held					NR	A	A	LQ	Tournament Not Held					
WST Pro Series	Tournament Not Held									RR	Tournament Not Held				
Gibraltar Open	Tournament Not Held				MR	4R	A	A	2R	1R	A	Tournament Not Held			
European Masters	Tournament Not Held					A	A	A	LQ	1R	A	A	Not Held		
Former non-ranking tournaments
Brazil Masters	NH	QF	Tournament Not Held												
Six-red World Championship	RR	NH	A	A	A	A	A	A	A	Tournament Not Held					
Haining Open	Not Held			Minor-Rank		A	A	A	SF	NH	A	Tournament Not Held			

Performance Table Legend
LQ	lost in the qualifying draw	#R	lost in the early rounds of the tournament (WR = Wildcard round, RR = Round robin)	QF	lost in the quarter-finals
SF	lost in the semi–finals	F	lost in the final	W	won the tournament
DNQ	did not qualify for the tournament	A	did not participate in the tournament	WD	withdrew from the tournament

NH / Not held	means an event was not held.
NR / Non-ranking event	means an event is/was no longer a ranking event.
R / Ranking event	means an event is/was now a ranking event

== Career finals ==
=== Seniors finals: 2 (1 title) ===
Outcome	No.	Year	Championship	Opponent in the final	Score
Runner-up	1.	2018	UK Seniors Championship	(Republic of Ireland) Ken Doherty	1–4
Winner	1.	2024	World Seniors Championship	(Republic of Ireland) Ken Doherty	5–2

=== Amateur finals: 5 (4 titles) ===
Outcome	No.	Year	Championship	Opponent in the final	Score
Runner-up	1.	2009	IBSF World Snooker Championship	(England) Alfie Burden	8–10
Winner	1.	2018	WSF Seniors Championship	(Wales) Darren Morgan	5–3
Winner	2.	2019	Pan American Snooker Championship	(United States) Renat Denkha	5–1
Winner	3.	2024	Q Tour Americas 1 – Event 1	(Brazil) Noel Rodrigues Moreira	5–1
Winner	4.	2025	Pan American Snooker Championship	(Brazil) Fabio Anderson Luerson	5–2
