= 2018 UK Seniors Championship =

UK Seniors Championship
Tournament information
- Dates: 24–25 October 2018
- Venue: Hull Venue
- City: Kingston upon Hull
- Country: England
- Organisation: World Seniors Tour
- Format: Seniors event
- Total prize fund: £24,500
- Winner's share: £10,000
- Highest break: ?

Final
- Champion: (Republic of Ireland) Ken Doherty
- Runner-up: (Brazil) Igor Figueiredo
- Score: 4–1

The 2018 UK Seniors Championship (sponsored by Credit Risk Solutions) was a senior snooker tournament, that took place at the Bonus Arena in Hull, England, from 24 to 25 October 2018. It was the first event of the 2018/2019 World Seniors Tour.

Jimmy White was the defending champion, but he lost 0–3 to Suchakree Poomjang in the quarterfinals. Ken Doherty won the event, defeating Brazil's Igor Figueiredo in the final 4–1.

In addition to the winner's cheque the champion secured a place in the qualifying tournament for the 2019 World Professional Snooker Championship in Sheffield.

== Prize fund ==
The breakdown of prize money is shown below:

- Winner: £10,000 and a place in the 2019 World Championships qualifying
- Runner-up: £5,000
- Semi-finals: £2,500
- Group runner-ups: £1,000
- Highest break: £500
- Total: £24,500

== Main draw ==
Round 1 Best of 5 frames
(Northern Ireland) Dennis Taylor (8)	0
(Thailand) Suchakree Poomjang	3
(Canada) Cliff Thorburn (6)	0
(Republic of Ireland) Rodney Goggins	3
(England) John Parrott (5)	1
(Republic of Ireland) Leo Fernandez	3
(England) Joe Johnson (7)	0
(Brazil) Igor Figueiredo	3

Quarter-finals; Best of 5 frames
(England) Jimmy White (1)	0
(Thailand) Suchakree Poomjang	3
(Republic of Ireland) Ken Doherty (4)	3
(Republic of Ireland) Rodney Goggins	0
(Scotland) Stephen Hendry (3)	2
(Republic of Ireland) Leo Fernandez	3*
(Jersey) Aaron Canavan (2)	0
(Brazil) Igor Figueiredo	3

Semi-finals; Best of 5 frames
(Thailand) Suchakree Poomjang	0
(Republic of Ireland) Ken Doherty (4)	3
(Republic of Ireland) Leo Fernandez	0
(Brazil) Igor Figueiredo	3

Final; Best of 7 frames
(Republic of Ireland) Ken Doherty (4)	4
(Brazil) Igor Figueiredo	1

- All matches played with a 30-second shot clock, with players having two time-outs per match
- *Re-spotted black replaced final frame deciders

== Final ==
Final: Best of 7 frames. Referee: Michaela Tabb. Bonus Arena, Hull, England, 25 October 2018.
Ireland; Ken Doherty (4)	4–1	Brazil; Igor Figueiredo
116–9 (116), 60–2, 14–78 (71), 118–0 (50, 57), 69–18
1	Century breaks	0
3	50+ breaks	1
