= Simon Bedford =

English snooker player

Personal information
- Born: 8 February 1976 (age 50) Bradford, West Yorkshire, England

Sport
- Country: England
- Sport: Snooker
- Professional: 1995–2001, 2002–2006, 2008–2014
- Highest ranking: 63 (2005/06)
- Best ranking finish: Last 32 (x4)

Simon Bedford (born 8 February 1976) is an English former professional snooker player.

== Career ==
Bedford qualified for the 1998 World Championship; he beat Gary Wilkinson 10–9, before losing 6–10 to Steve Davis. He also reached the last 32 of the European Open in 2004 and the Grand Prix in 2008. He returned to the Main Tour for the 2008–09 season by finishing fourth in the 2007/2008 Pontins International Open Series rankings.

In the 2012–13 season, he defeated Ronnie O'Sullivan 4–3 in the first round of the third event of the Players Tour Championship.

At the beginning of the 2013–14 season, in a qualifying match against Barry Pinches for the 2013 Australian Goldfields Open, a 19-year-old record from the qualifying stage of the 1994 British Open was broken. The match lasted 449 minutes and 46 seconds, the longest ever best-of-nine-frame match in the history of professional snooker. The previous record was 434 minutes and 12 seconds in the match between Ian Williamson and Robby Foldvari in 1994. The Bedford/Pinches match began on 31 May 2013 and ended on 1 June 2013; Bedford won 5–4, after being 4–0 up. He only entered six further events during the season, winning five matches. After a first round defeat in the UK Championship in November he did not enter another tournament, resulting in his relegation from the main tour as he ended the season ranked 99th in the world. Bedford returned to play in 2017 Q School and was knocked out in the fifth round of the first event and the second round of event two.

== Performance and rankings timeline ==
Tournament	1995/ 96	1996/ 97	1997/ 98	1998/ 99	1999/ 00	2000/ 01	2001/ 02	2002/ 03	2003/ 04	2004/ 05	2005/ 06	2008/ 09	2009/ 10	2010/ 11	2011/ 12	2012/ 13	2013/ 14	2018/ 19
Ranking (Note: It shows the ranking at the beginning of the season.)	(Note: New players on the Main Tour don't have a ranking.)	323	215	119	128	139	(Note: He was an amateur.)		93	73	63		72	65	(Note: Players qualified through Q School started the season without ranking points.)	(Note: Players qualified through Players Tour Championship Order of Merit started the season without ranking points.)	84	
Ranking tournaments
Riga Masters	Tournament Not Held																	2R
World Open (Note: The event was called the LG Cup (2001/2002-2003/2004) and the Grand Prix (1995/1996-2000/2001 and 2004/2005-2009/2010))	LQ	LQ	A	LQ	A	LQ	A	LQ	1R	1R	LQ	1R	LQ	LQ	A	WR	A	A
European Masters (Note: The event was called the Irish Open (1998/1999), the European Open (1995/1996-1996/1997 and 2001/2002-2003/2004) and the Malta Cup (2004/2005-2005/2006))	LQ	LQ	NH	LQ	Not Held		A	LQ	1R	LQ	LQ	Tournament Not Held						LQ
UK Championship	LQ	LQ	A	LQ	A	LQ	A	LQ	LQ	LQ	LQ	LQ	LQ	LQ	LQ	LQ	LQ	A
Scottish Open (Note: The event was called the International Open (1995/1996-1996/1997) and the Players Championship (2003/2004))	LQ	LQ	A	LQ	A	LQ	A	LQ	LQ	Tournament Not Held						NR	NH	A
German Masters (Note: The event was called the German Open (1995/1996-1997/1998))	LQ	LQ	A	NR	Tournament Not Held									LQ	LQ	LQ	A	A
World Grand Prix	Tournament Not Held																	DNQ
Welsh Open	LQ	LQ	A	LQ	A	LQ	A	LQ	LQ	LQ	LQ	LQ	LQ	LQ	A	LQ	A	A
Indian Open	Tournament Not Held																A	LQ
Players Championship (Note: The event was called the Players Tour Championship Finals (2010/2011-2013/2014))	Tournament Not Held													DNQ	DNQ	DNQ	DNQ	DNQ
Tour Championship	Tournament Not Held																	DNQ
China Open (Note: The event was called the China International (1997/1998-1998/1999))	Not Held		NR	LQ	A	LQ	A	Not Held		LQ	LQ	LQ	LQ	LQ	A	LQ	A	A
World Championship	LQ	LQ	1R	LQ	LQ	LQ	LQ	LQ	LQ	LQ	LQ	LQ	LQ	LQ	A	LQ	A	A
Non-ranking tournaments
The Masters	LQ	LQ	LQ	A	LQ	LQ	LQ	LQ	LQ	A	LQ	LQ	LQ	A	A	A	A	A
Former ranking tournaments
Asian Classic (Note: The event was called the Thailand Classic (1995/1996))	LQ	LQ	Tournament Not Held															
Thailand Masters (Note: The event was called the Thailand Open (1995/1996-1996/1997))	LQ	LQ	A	LQ	A	LQ	A	NR	Tournament Not Held									
British Open	LQ	LQ	A	LQ	A	LQ	A	LQ	LQ	LQ	Tournament Not Held							
Irish Masters	Non-Ranking Event							LQ	LQ	LQ	Tournament Not Held							
Northern Ireland Trophy	Tournament Not Held										NR	LQ	Tournament Not Held					
Bahrain Championship	Tournament Not Held											LQ	Tournament Not Held					
Wuxi Classic	Tournament Not Held											Non-Ranking Event				LQ	LQ	NH
Australian Goldfields Open (Note: The event was called the Australian Masters (1995/1996))	NR	Tournament Not Held													LQ	LQ	LQ	NH
Shanghai Masters	Tournament Not Held											LQ	LQ	LQ	LQ	A	LQ	NR

Performance Table Legend
LQ	lost in the qualifying draw	#R	lost in the early rounds of the tournament (WR = Wildcard round, RR = Round robin)	QF	lost in the quarter-finals
SF	lost in the semi-finals	F	lost in the final	W	won the tournament
DNQ	did not qualify for the tournament	A	did not participate in the tournament	WD	withdrew from the tournament

NH / Not Held	event was not held.
NR / Non-Ranking Event	event is/was no longer a ranking event.
R / Ranking Event	event is/was a ranking event.

== Tournament wins ==
=== Non-Ranking Wins: (2 titles) ===
- UK Tour Event 3 – 1998
- UK Tour Event 3 – 2000

=== Pro-am wins ===
- Vienna Snooker Open – 2012

=== Amateur wins ===
- PIOS – Event 1 - 2007
- Challenge Tour – Event 8 - 2018
