= 2017 UK Seniors Championship =

UK Seniors Championship
Tournament information
- Dates: 24–26 October 2017
- Venue: Harlequin Theatre
- City: Redhill
- Country: England
- Organisation: Snooker Legends
- Format: Seniors event
- Total prize fund: £14,500
- Winner's share: £7,500
- Highest break: (Republic of Ireland) Ken Doherty (137)

Final
- Champion: (England) Jimmy White
- Runner-up: (Republic of Ireland) Ken Doherty
- Score: 4–2

The 2017 UK Seniors Championship was a senior snooker tournament, that took place at the Harlequin Theatre in Redhill, England, from 24 to 26 October 2017. It was a first stage of the newly created World Seniors Tour.

The Championship was won by Jimmy White who beat Ken Doherty 4–2 in the final.

== Prize fund ==
The breakdown of prize money is shown below:

- Winner: £7,500
- Runner-up: £2,500
- Semi-finals: £1,000
- Quarter-finals: £500
- Highest break: £500
- Total: £14,500

== Main draw ==
Round 1 Best of 5 frames
(England) Gary Filtness	2
(England) Tony Knowles (8)	3*
(Northern Ireland) Patrick Wallace	3
(England) Joe Johnson (6)	0
(England) Les Dodd	3*
(Northern Ireland) Dennis Taylor (5)	2
(England) Johnathan Bagley	3
(Canada) Cliff Thorburn (7)	1

Quarter-finals; Best of 5 frames
(Scotland) Stephen Hendry (1)	3
(England) Tony Knowles (8)	0
(Republic of Ireland) Ken Doherty (4)	3
(Northern Ireland) Patrick Wallace	1
(England) Jimmy White (3)	3
(England) Les Dodd	1
(England) John Parrott (2)	0
(England) Johnathan Bagley	3

Semi-finals; Best of 5 frames
(Scotland) Stephen Hendry (1)	0
(Republic of Ireland) Ken Doherty (4)	3
(England) Jimmy White (3)	3
(England) Johnathan Bagley	1

Final; Best of 7 frames
(Republic of Ireland) Ken Doherty (4)	2
(England) Jimmy White (3)	4

- All matches had a 30-second shot clock with players having two 30 second time-outs per match.
- * A re-spotted black ball shootout replaced final frame deciders at 2–2.

== Final ==
Final: Best of 7 frames. Referee: Michaela Tabb. Harlequin Theatre, Redhill, England, 26 October 2017.
Ken Doherty (4); Ireland	2–4	Jimmy White (3); England
96–4, 19–73, 29–88, 69–6 (61), 12–76, 0–79
0	Century breaks	0
1	50+ breaks	0
