= 2018–19 snooker season =

Series of snooker tournaments

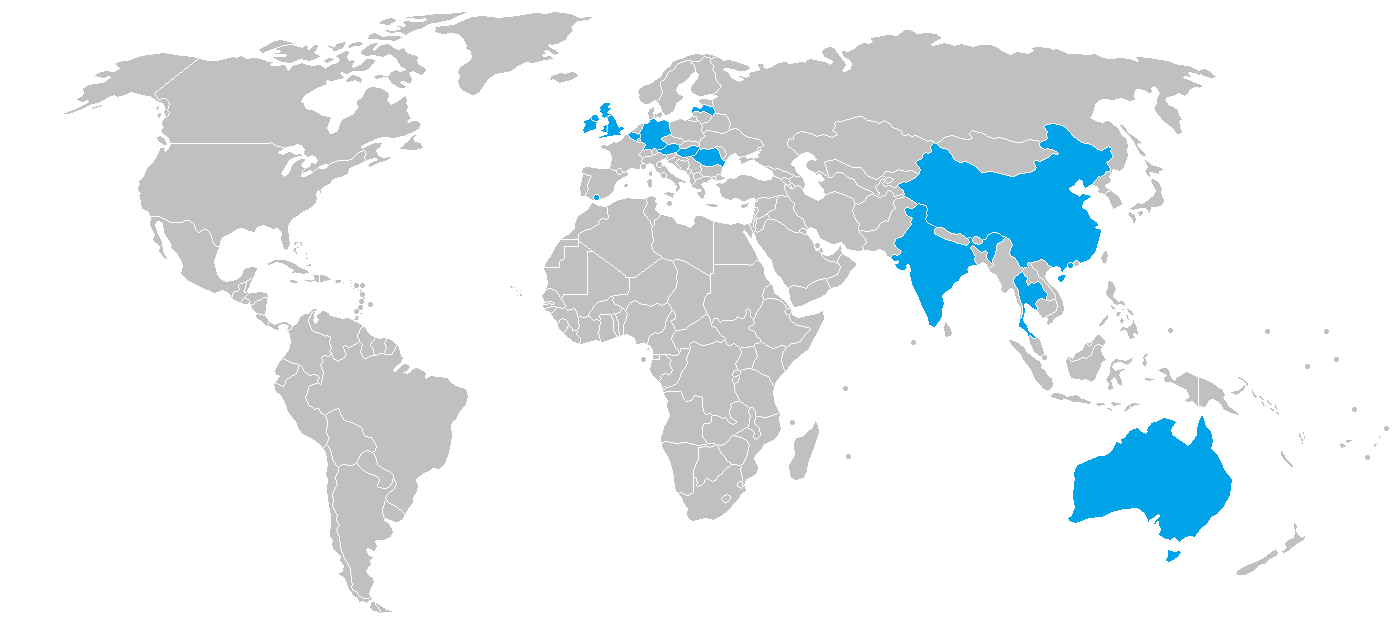
- Nations that hosted an event in the snooker calendar during the 2018–19 season

Details
- Duration: 10 May 2018 – 23 June 2019
- Tournaments: 54 (20 ranking events)

Triple Crown winners
- UK Championship: Ronnie O'Sullivan (ENG)
- Masters: Judd Trump (ENG)
- World Championship: Judd Trump (ENG)

The 2018–19 snooker season was a series of professional snooker tournaments played between 10 May 2018 and 23 June 2019. The season was made up of ranking tournaments, non-ranking tournaments and variant tournaments. In total, 54 events were competed in the 2018–19 season, beginning with the pro–am 2018 Vienna Open, and ending with the 2019 World Snooker Championship.

To be eligible to play in most tournaments, players had to have qualified to play on the World Snooker Tour, however, some wildcard former professional, and amateur players were eligible in certain competitions. The season also saw four events strictly for over 40s, as a part of the World Seniors Tour.

Ronnie O'Sullivan, Neil Robertson and Judd Trump each won three ranking events with Mark Allen, Stuart Bingham and Kyren Wilson each winning twice. Robertson reached six ranking event finals during the season.

== Players ==
The Main Tour consists of 128 professional players for the 2018/2019 season. The top 64 players from the prize money rankings after the 2018 World Championship and the 34 players earning a two-year card the previous year (excluding Lyu Haotian, who already climbed into the top 64 of the world rankings following the first year of his two-year tour card) automatically qualified for the season. Next, eight places were allocated from the top 8 on the One Year Ranking List, who had not already qualified for the Main Tour. Another two players came from the EBSA Qualifying Tour Play-Offs, two players came from the CBSA China Tour and a further 12 places were available through the 2018 Q School, four from each of the three events. The six remaining entries on to the tour were allocated from the international amateur events.

Due to the disputes between the IBSF and the WPBSA, the WPBSA decided that the winners of the tournaments organised by the IBSF or any continental confederations which were not affiliated to the World Snooker Federation would not be awarded tour cards. The only exception was the IBSF World Under-21 Snooker Championship, which had been concluded before the decision was made.

=== New professional players ===
All players listed below received a tour card for two seasons.

International champions

1. WSF Championship winner: Luo Honghao (CHN)
2. WSF Championship runner-up: Adam Stefanow (POL)
3. IBSF World Under-21 Snooker Championship winner: Fan Zhengyi (CHN)
4. EBSA European Snooker Championships winner: Harvey Chandler (ENG)
5. EBSA European Under-21 Snooker Championships winner: Simon Lichtenberg (GER)
6. ABSF African Championships winner: ~~Mohamed Ibrahim (EGY)~~ (withdrew)

One Year Ranking List

7. Elliot Slessor (ENG)
8. Tian Pengfei (CHN)
9. John Astley (ENG)
10. Oliver Lines (ENG)
11. Lee Walker (WAL)
12. Mei Xiwen (CHN)
13. Alfie Burden (ENG)
14. Zhang Anda (CHN)

EBSA Qualifying Tour Play-Offs

15. Jamie Clarke (WAL)
16. Joe O'Connor (ENG)

CBSA China Tour

17. Zhang Jiankang (CHN)
18. Chen Feilong (CHN)

Q School

Main article: 2018 Q School

Event 1

19. Jak Jones (WAL)
20. Sam Baird (ENG)
21. Hammad Miah (ENG)
22. Sam Craigie (ENG)

Event 2

23. Jordan Brown (NIR)
24. Craig Steadman (ENG)
25. Lu Ning (CHN)
26. Zhao Xintong (CHN)

Event 3

27. Thor Chuan Leong (MAS)
28. Kishan Hirani (WAL)
29. Andy Lee (HKG)
30. Ashley Carty (ENG)

Invitational Tour Card

31. James Wattana (THA)

== Calendar ==
The following tables outline the dates and results for all the World Snooker Tour, World Women's Snooker Tour, World Seniors Tour, Challenge Tour, and other events in the season.

=== World Snooker Tour ===
Start	Finish	Tournament	Venue	Winner	Score	Runner-up	Ref.
27 Jul	29 Jul	Riga Masters	Arena Riga in Riga, Latvia	Neil Robertson (AUS)	5‍–‍2	Jack Lisowski (ENG)	
6 Aug	12 Aug	World Open	Yushan Number One Middle School in Yushan, China	Mark Williams (WAL)	10‍–‍9	David Gilbert (ENG)	
22 Aug	26 Aug	Paul Hunter Classic	Stadthalle in Fürth, Germany	Kyren Wilson (ENG)	4‍–‍2	Peter Ebdon (ENG)	
3 Sep	8 Sep	Six-red World Championship†	Bangkok Convention Center in Bangkok, Thailand	Kyren Wilson (ENG)	8‍–‍4	Ding Junhui (CHN)	
10 Sep	16 Sep	Shanghai Masters†	Regal International East Asia Hotel in Shanghai, China	Ronnie O'Sullivan (ENG)	11‍–‍9	Barry Hawkins (ENG)	
24 Sep	30 Sep	China Championship	Guangzhou Tianhe Sports Centre in Guangzhou, China	Mark Selby (ENG)	10‍–‍9	John Higgins (SCO)	
1 Oct	7 Oct	European Masters	De Soeverein in Lommel, Belgium	Jimmy Robertson (ENG)	9‍–‍6	Joe Perry (ENG)	
15 Oct	21 Oct	English Open	K2 in Crawley, England	Stuart Bingham (ENG)	9‍–‍7	Mark Davis (ENG)	
24 Oct	25 Oct	Macau Masters†	JW Marriott Hotel Macau in Macau, China	Barry Hawkins (ENG); Ryan Day (WAL); Zhou Yuelong (CHN); Zhao Xintong (CHN)	5‍–‍1	Mark Williams (WAL); Marco Fu (HKG); Joe Perry (ENG); Zhang Anda (CHN)	
25 Oct		Six-red Macau Masters†	JW Marriott Hotel Macau in Macau, China	Barry Hawkins (ENG)	3‍–‍2	Mark Williams (WAL)	
28 Oct	4 Nov	International Championship	Baihu Media Broadcasting Centre in Daqing, China	Mark Allen (NIR)	10‍–‍5	Neil Robertson (AUS)	
5 Nov	11 Nov	Champion of Champions†	Ricoh Arena in Coventry, England	Ronnie O'Sullivan (ENG)	10‍–‍9	Kyren Wilson (ENG)	
12 Nov	18 Nov	Northern Ireland Open	Waterfront Hall in Belfast, Northern Ireland	Judd Trump (ENG)	9‍–‍7	Ronnie O'Sullivan (ENG)	
27 Nov	9 Dec	UK Championship	Barbican Centre in York, England	Ronnie O'Sullivan (ENG)	10‍–‍6	Mark Allen (NIR)	
10 Dec	16 Dec	Scottish Open	Emirates Arena in Glasgow, Scotland	Mark Allen (NIR)	9‍–‍7	Shaun Murphy (ENG)	
13 Jan	20 Jan	Masters†	Alexandra Palace in London, England	Judd Trump (ENG)	10‍–‍4	Ronnie O'Sullivan (ENG)	
30 Jan	3 Feb	German Masters	Tempodrom in Berlin, Germany	Kyren Wilson (ENG)	9‍–‍7	David Gilbert (ENG)	
4 Feb	10 Feb	World Grand Prix	The Centaur, Cheltenham Racecourse in Cheltenham, England	Judd Trump (ENG)	10‍–‍6	Ali Carter (ENG)	
11 Feb	17 Feb	Welsh Open	Motorpoint Arena in Cardiff, Wales	Neil Robertson (AUS)	9‍–‍7	Stuart Bingham (ENG)	
21 Feb	24 Feb	Shoot Out	Watford Colosseum in Watford, England	Thepchaiya Un-Nooh (THA)	1‍–‍0	Michael Holt (ENG)	
27 Feb	3 Mar	Indian Open	Grand Hyatt Kochi Bolgatty in Kochi, India	Matthew Selt (ENG)	5‍–‍3	Lyu Haotian (CHN)	
4 Mar	10 Mar	Players Championship	Preston Guild Hall in Preston, England	Ronnie O'Sullivan (ENG)	10‍–‍4	Neil Robertson (AUS)	
1 Jan	14 Mar	Championship League†	Ricoh Arena and Barnsley Metrodome in Coventry/Barnsley, England	Martin Gould (ENG)	3‍–‍1	Jack Lisowski (ENG)	
15 Mar	17 Mar	Gibraltar Open	Tercentenary Sports Hall in Gibraltar, Gibraltar	Stuart Bingham (ENG)	4‍–‍1	Ryan Day (WAL)	
19 Mar	24 Mar	Tour Championship	Venue Cymru in Llandudno, Wales	Ronnie O'Sullivan (ENG)	13‍–‍11	Neil Robertson (AUS)	
1 Apr	7 Apr	China Open	Olympic Sports Center Gymnasium in Beijing, China	Neil Robertson (AUS)	11‍–‍4	Jack Lisowski (ENG)	
20 Apr	6 May	World Championship	Crucible Theatre in Sheffield, England	Judd Trump (ENG)	18‍–‍9	John Higgins (SCO)	

Ranking event
† Non-ranking event

=== World Women's Snooker ===
Start	Finish	Tournament	Venue	Winner	Score	Runner-up	Ref.
15 Sep	16 Sep	UK Women's Championship	Northern Snooker Centre in Leeds, England	Ng On-Yee (HKG)	4‍–‍1	Rebecca Kenna (ENG)	
5 Oct	8 Oct	European Women's Masters	De Maxx in Neerpelt, Belgium	Reanne Evans (ENG)	4‍–‍1	Nutcharut Wongharuthai (THA)	
25 Oct		Australian Women's Open	Mounties in Sydney, Australia	Ng On-Yee (HKG)	4‍–‍2	Katrina Wan (HKG)	
24 Nov	25 Nov	Eden Women's Masters	South West Snooker Academy in Quedgeley, England	Reanne Evans (ENG)	4‍–‍0	Rebecca Kenna (ENG)	
1 Feb	3 Feb	Belgian Women's Open	The Trickshot in Bruges, Belgium	Reanne Evans (ENG)	4‍–‍1	Ng On-Yee (HKG)	
13 Apr		World Women's 10-Red Championship	Northern Snooker Centre in Leeds, England	Reanne Evans (ENG)	4‍–‍3	Ng On-Yee (HKG)	
14 Apr		World Women's 6-Red Championship	Northern Snooker Centre in Leeds, England	Reanne Evans (ENG)	4‍–‍1	Nutcharut Wongharuthai (THA)	
17 Jun	19 Jun	Women's Snooker World Cup	Hi-End Snooker Club in Bangkok, Thailand	Thailand A	4‍–‍0	Hong Kong A	
20 Jun	23 Jun	World Women's Championship	Hi-End Snooker Club in Bangkok, Thailand	Reanne Evans (ENG)	6‍–‍3	Nutcharut Wongharuthai (THA)	

=== World Seniors Tour ===
Start	Finish	Tournament	Venue	Winner	Score	Runner-up	Ref.
24 Oct	25 Oct	UK Seniors Championship	Bonus Arena in Hull, England	Ken Doherty (IRL)	4‍–‍1	Igor Figueiredo (BRA)	
5 Jan	6 Jan	Seniors Irish Masters	Goffs in Kill, Ireland	Jimmy White (ENG)	4‍–‍1	Rodney Goggins (IRL)	
3 Mar		Seniors 6-Red World Championship	Waterfront Hall in Belfast, Northern Ireland	Jimmy White (ENG)	4‍–‍2	Aaron Canavan (JER)	
11 Apr		Seniors Masters	Crucible Theatre in Sheffield, England	Joe Johnson (ENG)	2‍–‍1	Barry Pinches (ENG)	

=== Challenge Tour ===
Start	Finish	Tournament	Venue	Winner	Score	Runner-up	Ref.
2 Jun	3 Jun	Challenge Tour 1	Meadowside Leisure Centre in Burton upon Trent, England	Brandon Sargeant (ENG)	3‍–‍1	Luke Simmonds (ENG)	
10 Jul	11 Jul	Challenge Tour 2	Preston Guild Hall in Preston, England	David Grace (ENG)	3‍–‍0	Mitchell Mann (ENG)	
28 Jul		Challenge Tour 3	Arena Riga in Riga, Latvia	Barry Pinches (ENG)	3‍–‍2	Jackson Page (WAL)	
27 Aug	28 Aug	Challenge Tour 4	Stadthalle in Fürth, Germany	Mitchell Mann (ENG)	3‍–‍0	Dylan Emery (WAL)	
18 Sep	19 Sep	Challenge Tour 5	Cueball Derby in Derby, England	David Lilley (ENG)	3‍–‍1	Brandon Sargeant (ENG)	
4 Oct	5 Oct	Challenge Tour 6	De Soeverein in Lommel, Belgium	David Grace (ENG)	3‍–‍0	Ben Hancorn (ENG)	
13 Oct	14 Oct	Challenge Tour 7	Preston Guild Hall in Preston, England	Joel Walker (ENG)	3‍–‍0	Jenson Kendrick (ENG)	
14 Nov	25 Nov	Challenge Tour 8	Snooker Terminál in Budapest, Hungary	Simon Bedford (ENG)	3‍–‍1	David Lilley (ENG)	
26 Jan	27 Jan	Challenge Tour 9	Star Snooker Academy in Sheffield, England	Adam Duffy (ENG)	3‍–‍1	Matthew Glasby (ENG)	
6 Mar	7 Mar	Challenge Tour 10	South West Snooker Academy in Gloucester, England	George Pragnall (ENG)	3‍–‍2	Callum Lloyd (WAL)	

=== Other events ===
Start	Finish	Tournament	Venue	Winner	Score	Runner-up	Ref.
10 May	13 May	Vienna Open	15 Reds Köö Wien Snooker Club in Vienna, Austria	Michael Georgiou (CYP)	5‍–‍4	Ross Muir (SCO)	
12 Jul	15 Jul	Golden Q Cup	Golden Q Snooker Club in Baia Mare, Romania	Luca Brecel (BEL)	5‍–‍1	Michael Georgiou (CYP)	
28 Jul	31 Jul	Pink Ribbon	South West Snooker Academy in Gloucester, England	Andrew Norman (ENG)	4‍–‍2	Harvey Chandler (ENG)	
31 Jul	4 Aug	Haining Open	International Campus Zhejiang University in Haining, China	Mark Selby (ENG)	5‍–‍4	Li Hang (CHN)	

== Points distribution ==
2018/2019 points distribution for World Snooker Tour ranking events:

Round Tournament	R144	R128	R80	R64	R48	R32	R16	QF	SF	F	W
Riga Masters	—	£0	—	£1,500	—	£3,000	£4,000	£6,000	£15,000	£25,000	£50,000
World Open	—	£0	—	£4,000	—	£8,000	£13,000	£20,000	£32,500	£75,000	£150,000
Paul Hunter Classic	—	£0	—	£600	—	£1,000	£1,725	£3,000	£4,500	£10,000	£20,000
China Championship	—	£0	—	£4,000	—	£7,500	£13,000	£20,000	£32,000	£75,000	£150,000
European Masters	—	£0	—	£3,000	—	£4,000	£6,000	£11,000	£17,500	£35,000	£75,000
English Open	—	£0	—	£2,500	—	£3,500	£6,000	£10,000	£20,000	£30,000	£70,000
International Championship	—	£0	—	£4,000	—	£8,500	£13,500	£21,500	£32,000	£75,000	£175,000
Northern Ireland Open	—	£0	—	£2,500	—	£3,500	£6,000	£10,000	£20,000	£30,000	£70,000
UK Championship	—	£0	—	£5,000	—	£10,000	£15,000	£22,500	£35,000	£75,000	£170,000
Scottish Open	—	£0	—	£2,500	—	£3,500	£6,000	£10,000	£20,000	£30,000	£70,000
German Masters	—	£0	—	£3,000	—	£4,000	£5,000	£10,000	£20,000	£35,000	£80,000
World Grand Prix	—	—	—	—	—	£5,000	£7,500	£12,500	£20,000	£40,000	£100,000
Welsh Open	—	£0	—	£2,500	—	£3,500	£6,000	£10,000	£20,000	£30,000	£70,000
Shoot Out	—	£0 (Note: First round losers in the Shoot Out receive £250 prize money which do not count towards the prize money rankings.)	—	£500	—	£1,000	£2,000	£4,000	£8,000	£16,000	£32,000
Indian Open	—	£0	—	£2,000	—	£4,000	£6,000	£10,000	£15,000	£25,000	£50,000
Players Championship	—	—	—	—	—	—	£10,000	£15,000	£30,000	£50,000	£125,000
Gibraltar Open	—	£0	—	£1,500	—	£2,500	£3,000	£4,000	£6,000	£12,000	£25,000
Tour Championship	—	—	—	—	—	—	—	£20,000	£40,000	£60,000	£150,000
China Open	—	£0	—	£5,000	—	£11,000	£18,000	£27,000	£45,000	£90,000	£225,000
World Championship	£0	—	£10,000	—	£15,000	£20,000 (Note: Players who lose their first match receive no ranking points.)	£30,000	£50,000	£100,000	£200,000	£500,000
