= Indian Open (snooker) =

Snooker competition in India

Tournament information
- Country: India
- Established: 2013
- Organisation(s): World Professional Billiards and Snooker Association
- Format: Ranking event
- Total prize fund: £323,000
- Final year: 2019
- Final champion: (England) Matthew Selt

The Indian Open was a professional ranking snooker tournament. Matthew Selt was the final champion in 2019.

== History ==
The event was introduced in the 2013/2014 season and was the first ever ranking event to be held in India. The inaugural event was held between 14 and 18 October 2013 at the Le Meridian Hotel in New Delhi. The Billiards and Snooker Federation of India has signed a three-year contract for the tournament. In August 2014, it was announced that the event will be held at the Grand Hyatt in Mumbai. In September 2014, it was announced that the event has been postponed due to the State Election in Maharashtra, with the original dates of 13–17 October 2014 changed to 10–14 March 2015. The qualifying round held at the Barnsley Metrodome in Barnsley was due to take place from 18 to 21 September 2014 and has been moved to 12–13 February 2015.

Although the event was absent from the 2015/16 season it returned for the 2016/17 season, and was held in Hyderabad. For the 2017/18 season the tournament was held in Vishakhapatnam.

== Winners ==
Year	Winner	Runner-up	Final score	Location	Season
2013	(China) Ding Junhui	(India) Aditya Mehta	5–0	New Delhi	2013/14
2015	(Wales) Michael White	(England) Ricky Walden	5–0	Mumbai	2014/15
2016	(Scotland) Anthony McGill	(England) Kyren Wilson	5–2	Hyderabad	2016/17
2017	(Scotland) John Higgins	(Scotland) Anthony McGill	5–1	Vishakhapatnam	2017/18
2019	(England) Matthew Selt	(China) Lyu Haotian	5–3	Kochi	2018/19

== Statistics ==
- Highest ranked champion: John Higgins (2017) – #2
- Lowest ranked champion: Matthew Selt (2019) – #41
- Highest break: 147
  - Zhou Yuelong (2019)

== See also ==
- Bombay International
