= Connexin Live Arena =

Indoor sports and event venue in Kingston upon Hull, England

Connexin Live
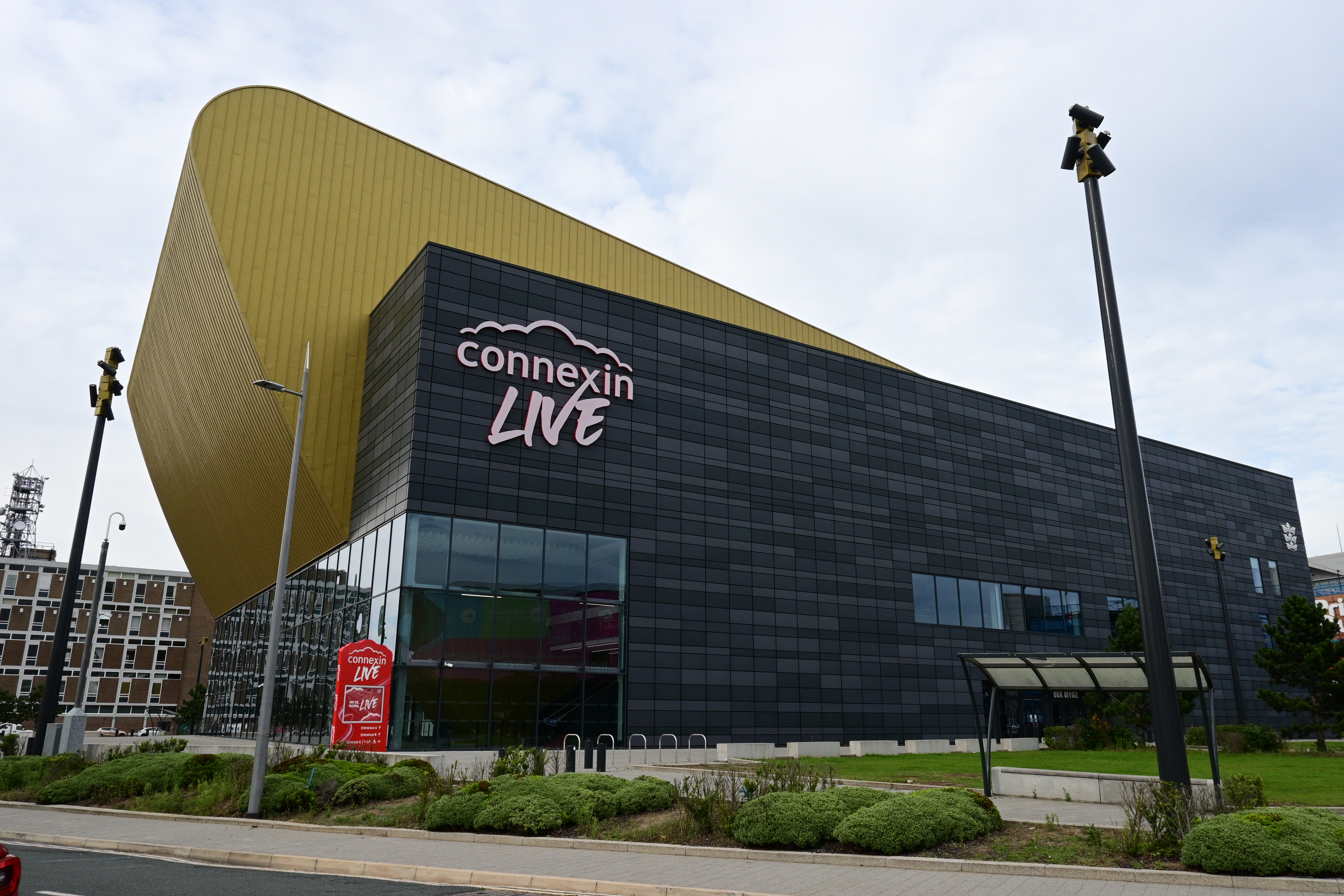
- The Connexin Live Arena in August 2023
- Interactive map of Connexin Live
- Former names: Hull Venue (planning/construction phase); Bonus Arena
- Address: Myton Street; Kingston upon Hull; HU1 2PS; England
- Coordinates: 53°44′30″N 00°20′31″W
- Owner: Hull City Council
- Operator: ASM Global
- Capacity: 3,500 (general admission); 2,900 (reserved)

Construction
- Groundbreaking: 3 October 2016
- Opened: 30 August 2018
- Cost: £36 million (£49.4 million in 2025)
- Architect: AFL Architects
- Project manager: NPS Humber
- Services engineer: Howard Civil Engineering
- Main contractor: BAM Construct UK

Website
- Venue Website

The Connexin Live (formerly Bonus Arena) is an indoor arena in Kingston upon Hull, East Riding of Yorkshire, England, near the Hull Marina. It opened in August 2018 and hosts music, comedy, and sports events.

== Construction ==
Logo used from 2018 to 2023

The venue was built on a brownfield site, between the Humber Estuary and Hull City Centre. Local steel, manufactured in Scunthorpe, was used on the project.

In June 2018, Bonus Group secured the naming rights to the venue. In August 2023, the naming rights were transferred to local company Connexin in a five-year deal and the venue was renamed Connexin Live.

== Events ==
=== Music ===
Since opening, the arena has hosted a variety of concerts and music oriented shows from the following acts: (Note: This is not a thorough & definitive list.)

- Van Morrison
- Jack White
- The Vamps
- Bob Dylan,
- Paloma Faith
- James Arthur
- The Courteeners
- Catfish and the Bottlemen
- Two Door Cinema Club
- Texas (band)
- Westlife
- Boyzone
- JLS
- George Ezra
- Noel Gallagher's High Flying Birds
- Sean Paul
- Kaiser Chiefs
- The Darkness (band)
- Pet Shop Boys
- Stereophonics
- Diversity
- Richard Ashcroft
- Blossoms
- Elbow
- Frank Turner and The Sleeping Souls
- The Specials
- Tom Grennan (2021)
- Bring Me the Horizon
- Bastille
- You Me at Six
- The Offspring
- Bullet for my Valentine
- Corey Taylor
- Less Than Jake
- Bowling for Soup

=== Comedy ===
Comedians who have played shows at the Connexin Live Arena include:

- James Acaster
- Jimmy Carr (Laughs Funny, November 2025)
- Rob Beckett
- Romesh Ranganathan
- Micky Flanagan
- Rhod Gilbert
- Jack Whitehall
- Michael McIntyre
- Russell Howard
- John Bishop
- Sarah Millican
- Greg Davies (Full Fat Legend, June 2025)

=== Other events ===
Other acts and events that have taken place at the Connexin Live Arena include Strictly Come Dancing Live!, Question of Sport Live Tour and Professor Brian Cox's Horizon tour.

The Harlem Globetrotters have visited the Connexin Live Arena on two occasions, first playing on 14 October 2022 as part of the Spread Game Tour before returning on 25 February 2024 as part of the team's 2024 World Tour.

The arena hosted its first professional wrestling event in 2019 with the visit of WWE NXT UK between 15 and 16 November. The World Wrestling Entertainment brand had last visited Hull's Ice Arena in 2005, with the visit playing host a return for former Hull Kingston Rovers professional rugby league player Luke Menzies, going by the stage name of Ridge Holland, to the city. The World Snooker Tour Championship took place in 2023 with Shaun Murphy lifting the title, and World Seniors Snooker have hosted their Seniors UK Championship and 900 series events at the venue.

Graduation ceremonies for the University of Hull have been held at the Connexin Live Arena since July 2019, with the first ceremonies held initially as a trial of the venue to replace Hull City Hall as the ceremony's main venue.

Political party Reform UK held a launch event on 28 February 2025 at the Connexin Live Arena for Luke Campbell's 2025 campaign to be Mayor of Hull and East Yorkshire, with 2,000 supporters attending the event and party members including leader Nigel Farage and East Riding councillor for Bridlington Central and Old Town Maria Bowtell also speaking.
