= 2020 European Masters =

2020 European Masters may refer to:

- 2020 European Masters (2019–20 season), a snooker tournament held in January 2020
- 2020 European Masters (2020–21 season), a snooker tournament held in September 2020
