= 2022 Turkish Masters =

Snooker tournament

2022 Nirvana Turkish Masters

Tournament information
- Dates: 7–13 March 2022
- Venue: Nirvana Cosmopolitan Hotel
- City: Antalya
- Country: Turkey
- Organisation: World Snooker Tour
- Format: Ranking event
- Total prize fund: £500,000
- Winner's share: £100,000
- Highest break: Judd Trump (ENG) (147)

Final
- Champion: Judd Trump (ENG)
- Runner-up: Matthew Selt (ENG)
- Score: 10–4

The 2022 Turkish Masters (officially the 2022 Nirvana Turkish Masters) was a professional snooker tournament that took place from 7 to 13 March 2022 at the Nirvana Cosmopolitan Hotel in Antalya, Turkey. The 13th ranking event of the 2021–22 snooker season, it was the only staging of the Turkish Masters and the first time that a professional snooker event had been staged in Turkey. The tournament was originally scheduled to take place from 27 September to 3 October 2021, but the World Snooker Tour postponed it until March 2022 due to the COVID-19 pandemic and the 2021 Turkey wildfires. Qualifying took place from 2 to 6 February 2022 at the Morningside Arena in Leicester, England. The tournament was broadcast by Turkish Radio and Television Corporation domestically in Turkey, and Eurosport in Europe. The winner received £100,000 from a total prize fund of £500,000.

Judd Trump won the event, defeating Matthew Selt 10–4 in the final, to capture his 23rd ranking title and his first ranking tournament of the season. He made a maximum break, the sixth of his career and the highest of the tournament, in the 10th frame of the final.

== Format ==
The event was the first and only edition of the Turkish Masters, and the first and only time a snooker world ranking event has been played in Turkey. It took place from 7 to 13 March 2022 at the Nirvana Cosmopolitan Hotel in Antalya. Organised by the World Snooker Tour, it was the 13th ranking event of the 2021–22 snooker season, following the Welsh Open and preceding the Gibraltar Open. Originally scheduled to take place from 27 September to 3 October 2021, it was postponed until March 2022 due to the COVID-19 pandemic and the 2021 Turkey wildfires. This postponement also affected the qualifying round, which was held from 2 to 6 February 2022 at the Morningside Arena in Leicester. The tournament was broadcast by the Turkish Radio and Television Corporation in Turkey and Eurosport in Europe. The event was also shown on Liaoning TV, Superstar online, Kuaishou, Migu, Youku and Huya.com in China; Premier Sports Network in the Philippines; Now TV in Hong Kong; True Sport in Thailand; Sports Cast in Taiwan; and Astro SuperSports in Malaysia. In all other territories, the event was available from Matchroom Sport.

World number two Ronnie O'Sullivan declined to enter the tournament because he was not offered any additional financial incentive. WPBSA chairman Jason Ferguson stated that although he was disappointed by O'Sullivan's decision, the governing body had to maintain a level playing field and would not offer players extra money to appear in tournaments. World number four Neil Robertson and reigning world champion Mark Selby both withdrew for personal reasons. This meant that three of the top four players in the world rankings did not participate.

=== Prize fund ===
There was a total prize fund of £500,000, with the winner receiving £100,000. A breakdown of prize money for the event is shown below:

- Winner: £100,000
- Runner-up: £45,000
- Semi-final: £20,000
- Quarter-final: £12,500
- Last 16: £7,500
- Last 32: £5,500
- Last 64: £3,500
- Highest break: £5,000
- Total: £500,000

== Summary ==
=== Opening ceremony incident ===
During the tournament's opening ceremony, held at the Nirvana Cosmopolitan Hotel on 6 March, Robert Milkins arrived intoxicated after drinking heavily to celebrate his birthday. He had verbal altercations with other players and hotel guests, and attempted to punch WPBSA chairman Jason Ferguson. After falling and cutting his chin in the hotel toilets, he was taken to hospital by fellow professional Jimmy Robertson, where he had his stomach pumped. Although Milkins apologised to the event organisers and hotel management for his behaviour, he stated that he narrowly avoided being removed from the tournament. The World Snooker Tour referred Milkins to the sport's governing body over the incident. At a subsequent disciplinary hearing, Milkins accepted that he had brought the sport into disrepute and breached his player's contract. He was fined £6,000 and ordered to pay an additional £1,000 for the costs of the hearing. Milkins later disclosed that he had received counseling after the incident through footballer Tony Adams’ mental health charity Sporting Chance. He credited the counselling with helping him turn his career around and win ranking titles at the 2022 Gibraltar Open and the 2023 Welsh Open.

=== Early rounds ===
In the round of 64, John Higgins made two century breaks, including a 128 in the final frame, to defeat the EBSA European Under-21 Snooker Championships winner Dylan Emery 5–2. Emery, playing as an amateur, had already gained a place on the World Snooker Tour from the 2022–23 snooker season. Higgins predicted Emery would "do well" on the tour, but said he was still "raw". Si Jiahui, another amateur player, defeated world number 13 Anthony McGill 5–2. Oliver Lines trailed by 50 points in the deciding frame against Xiao Guodong, but won the match with a 69 clearance. Shaun Murphy, yet to reach a ranking semi-final in the season, whitewhashed Lyu Haotian in 63 minutes, making breaks of 64, 59, and 58. Ding Junhui, who had slipped to 32nd in the world rankings, fell 1–4 behind against Milkins, but then took four consecutive frames with breaks of 131, 105, 81, and 55 to win 5–4. World number three Judd Trump defeated Chris Wakelin 5–3. Jak Jones took a 4–2 lead against 11th seed Mark Allen. Even though Allen drew level, Jones made a break of 79 in the deciding frame to record one of the biggest wins of his career.

In the round of 32, Matthew Selt defeated Zhao Xintong 5–2, winning the first three frames on the colours, and later making breaks of 70 and 80. Higgins whitewashed Michael Holt 5–0, making breaks of 121, 54, and 69, while Si reached the last 16 by defeating Tom Ford 5–1. Ding won the opening frame against Kyren Wilson, but Wilson won three in a row to take a 3–1 lead. After the interval, Ding produced a run of 255 points without reply, including breaks of 73, 105, and 100, and then won a scrappy eighth frame on the pink to defeat Wilson 5–3. Trump made a 116 break in his first frame against Liang, but Liang won four in a row to lead 4–1. He had chances to win the match in the sixth and seventh frames, but missed crucial pots, allowing Trump to take the match to a decider, which he won. Ali Carter lost the first three frames against Matthew Stevens but came back to win with a clearance in the decider.

In the round of 16, Graeme Dott defeated Higgins in a deciding frame. Ding also defeated Si in a decider, making breaks of 64, 93, 73, 127, 105, and 97 to reach his first ranking quarter-final since the 2021 German Masters. Selt defeated Thepchaiya Un-Nooh 5–1, making breaks of 72, 80, and 61. Trump came back from 3–4 behind to beat Zhou Yuelong 5–4. Zhou had chances to win the match in the eighth frame, but Trump won it on the colours after snookering Zhou on the yellow, and then won the decider after Zhou missed a difficult pot on a red to a centre pocket. Oliver Lines defeated Yan Bingtao in a 45-minute deciding frame to reach the first ranking quarter-final of his career, while Carter whitewashed Sam Craigie 5–0, including a break of 135. Murphy made breaks of 51, 70, 69, 81, 61 and 65 to defeat Jones 5–3 and reach his second ranking quarter-final of the season.

=== Quarter-finals, semi-finals, and final ===
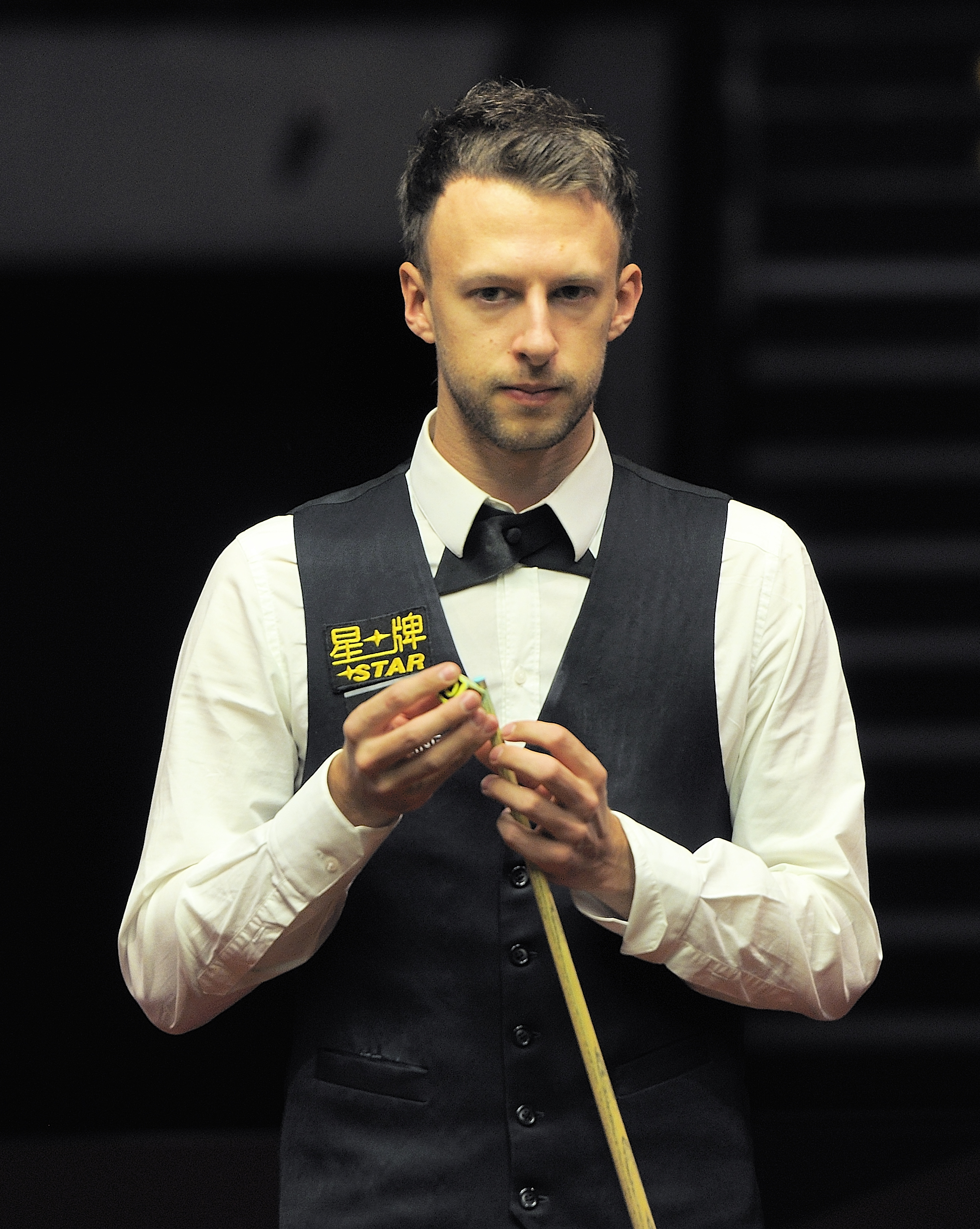
Judd Trump won the event, making a maximum break in a 10–4 victory in the final over Matthew Selt.

The quarter-finals saw Trump defeat Carter 5–3. Both players complained about the playing conditions on the table, which was fixed with wooden boards and a car jack during the mid-session interval. Afterwards, Trump commented that his recent performances were “probably the worst I have played for 10 years". The match between Murphy and Lines went to a deciding frame, which Murphy won to reach his first semi-final since the 2021 World Snooker Championship. Ding defeated Dott 5–1, making breaks of 72, 102, and 64 to reach his first ranking semi-final since the 2019 UK Championship. Selt defeated Gould 5–3.

In the semi-finals, Selt took a 3–0 lead over Ding, winning the third frame on a respotted black, but Ding responded with breaks of 97 and 60 to reduce Selt's lead to one. Selt led by 56 points in the sixth frame, but missed key reds, allowing Ding to level the scores with a 90 clearance. Ding won the seventh frame after Selt overcut a pot on the green. Although Selt won the eighth and ninth frames with breaks of 46 and 59 to move 5–4 ahead, Ding made an 84 break in the 10th frame to force the decider, making their match the 27th of the tournament to go to a deciding frame. Selt missed a black off the spot in the decider, but left Ding snookered, and won the frame to reach his second ranking final. In the other semi-final, Trump won the opening frame against Murphy with a break of 79, but Murphy responded with breaks of 99 and 91 to lead 2–1. Murphy had a chance to make a winning clearance in the fourth but missed a pot on the final red along the top cushion, allowing Trump to level at 2–2. After the mid-session interval, Trump won four consecutive frames, capitalising on missed shots from Murphy, to win the match 6–2 and reach his 35th ranking final.

Trump took a 5–3 lead over Selt in the afternoon session of the final. In the first frame of the evening session, Trump gave away 60 foul points while trying to escape from a series of snookers, but won the frame with an 88 clearance. The players scored a combined 189 points in the frame, just three short of the all-time professional record of 192 set by Peter Lines and Dominic Dale in 2012. From the ninth to the 11th frames, Trump scored 333 points without reply, including a 147 in the 10th frame, the sixth maximum break of his career and the 10th maximum made in a professional snooker final. Selt won the 12th frame, but Trump won the next two with breaks of 82 and 114 to clinch a 10–4 victory, capturing his first ranking title of the season and the 23rd of his career. Trump said afterward that he hoped his performance in the final would foster greater Turkish interest in the sport and inspire some children to take up snooker. His win ensured that he qualified for the 2022 Tour Championship, which was limited to the top eight players on the season's money list. Trump had been 17th on the list before the Welsh Open, but reaching the final of that tournament and winning the Turkish Masters moved him up to fourth place.

== Main draw ==
The draw for the event is shown below. Players in bold denote match winners.

=== Top half ===
**Last 64**; Best of 9 frames
**(China) Wu Yize**	**5**
(Republic of Ireland) Aaron Hill	0
(China) **Lu Ning (32)**	**w/o**
(England) Zak Surety	w/d
**(England) Jack Lisowski (16)**	**5**
(England) Martin O'Donnell (49)	4
**(England) Martin Gould (17)**	**5**
(England) David Grace (48)	4
(England) Ashley Hugill	2
**(Northern Ireland) Jordan Brown (24)**	**5**
**(Thailand) Thepchaiya Un-Nooh (56)**	**5**
(Scotland) Stephen Maguire (9)	4
(Switzerland) Alexander Ursenbacher (40)	4
**(England) Matthew Selt (25)**	**5**
(Wales) Michael White	4
**(China) Zhao Xintong (8)**	**5**
**(Scotland) John Higgins (5)**	**5**
(Wales) Dylan Emery	2
(Germany) Lukas Kleckers	4
**(England) Michael Holt (37)**	**5**
**(Wales) Jackson Page**	**5**
(Germany) Simon Lichtenberg	0
**(Scotland) Graeme Dott (21)**	**5**
(Scotland) Scott Donaldson (44)	4
(England) Anthony Hamilton (45)	2
**(England) Tom Ford (20)**	**5**
**(China) Si Jiahui**	**5**
(Scotland) Anthony McGill (13)	2
(England) Robert Milkins (36)	4
**(China) Ding Junhui (29)**	**5**
(China) Tian Pengfei (61)	1
**(England) Kyren Wilson (4)**	**5**

**Last 32**; Best of 9 frames
(China) Wu Yize	4
**(China) Lu Ning (32)**	**5**
(England) Jack Lisowski (16)	4
**(England) Martin Gould (17)**	**5**
(Northern Ireland) Jordan Brown (24)	1
**(Thailand) Thepchaiya Un-Nooh (56)**	**5**
**(England) Matthew Selt (25)**	**5**
(China) Zhao Xintong (8)	2
**(Scotland) John Higgins (5)**	**5**
(England) Michael Holt (37)	0
(Wales) Jackson Page	2
**(Scotland) Graeme Dott (21)**	**5**
(England) Tom Ford (20)	1
**(China) Si Jiahui**	**5**
**(China) Ding Junhui (29)**	**5**
(England) Kyren Wilson (4)	3

**Last 16**; Best of 9 frames
(China) Lu Ning (32)	4
**(England) Martin Gould (17)**	**5**
(Thailand) Thepchaiya Un-Nooh (56)	1
**(England) Matthew Selt (25)**	**5**
(Scotland) John Higgins (5)	4
**(Scotland) Graeme Dott (21)**	**5**
(China) Si Jiahui	4
**(China) Ding Junhui (29)**	**5**

**Quarter-finals**; Best of 9 frames
(England) Martin Gould (17)	3
**(England) Matthew Selt (25)**	**5**
(Scotland) Graeme Dott (21)	1
**(China) Ding Junhui (29)**	**5**

**Semi-finals**; Best of 11 frames
**(England) Matthew Selt (25)**	**6**
(China) Ding Junhui (29)	5

=== Bottom half ===
**Last 64**; Best of 9 frames
(Ukraine) Iulian Boiko	1
**(England) Andrew Higginson (62)**	**5**
(China) Xiao Guodong (30)	4
**(England) Oliver Lines**	**5**
**(China) Yan Bingtao (14)**	**5**
(England) Joe O'Connor (51)	2
(England) Andy Hicks	2
**(England) Elliot Slessor (46)**	**5**
(England) Ben Woollaston (43)	3
**(Iran) Hossein Vafaei (22)**	**5**
**(Wales) Jak Jones (54)**	**5**
(Northern Ireland) Mark Allen (11)	4
**(England) Jimmy Robertson (38)**	**5**
(China) Cao Yupeng	2
(China) Lyu Haotian (59)	0
**(England) Shaun Murphy (6)**	**5**
(Wales) Mark Williams (7)	3
**(Wales) Matthew Stevens (58)**	**5**
**(England) Ali Carter (26)**	**5**
(Wales) Jamie Jones (39)	1
**(China) Yuan Sijun**	**5**
(England) Mark Davis (55)	3
(England) Ricky Walden (23)	4
**(England) Sam Craigie (42)**	**5**
(China) Fan Zhengyi	4
**(China) Zhou Yuelong (18)**	**5**
(England) Stuart Carrington (50)	1
**(Belgium) Luca Brecel (15)**	**5**
(England) Joe Perry (34)	2
**(China) Liang Wenbo (31)**	**5**
(England) Chris Wakelin (63)	3
**(England) Judd Trump (2)**	**5**

**Last 32**; Best of 9 frames
(England) Andrew Higginson (62)	3
**(England) Oliver Lines**	**5**
**(China) Yan Bingtao (14)**	**5**
(England) Elliot Slessor (46)	4
(Iran) Hossein Vafaei (22)	4
**(Wales) Jak Jones (54)**	**5**
(England) Jimmy Robertson (38)	3
**(England) Shaun Murphy (6)**	**5**
(Wales) Matthew Stevens (58)	4
**(England) Ali Carter (26)**	**5**
(China) Yuan Sijun	2
**(England) Sam Craigie (42)**	**5**
**(China) Zhou Yuelong (18)**	**5**
(Belgium) Luca Brecel (15)	4
(China) Liang Wenbo (31)	4
**(England) Judd Trump (2)**	**5**

**Last 16**; Best of 9 frames
**(England) Oliver Lines**	**5**
(China) Yan Bingtao (14)	4
(Wales) Jak Jones (54)	3
**(England) Shaun Murphy (6)**	**5**
**(England) Ali Carter (26)**	**5**
(England) Sam Craigie (42)	0
(China) Zhou Yuelong (18)	4
**(England) Judd Trump (2)**	**5**

**Quarter-finals**; Best of 9 frames
(England) Oliver Lines	4
**(England) Shaun Murphy (6)**	**5**
(England) Ali Carter (26)	3
**(England) Judd Trump (2)**	**5**

**Semi-finals**; Best of 11 frames
(England) Shaun Murphy (6)	2
**(England) Judd Trump (2)**	**6**

=== Final ===
Final: Best of 19 frames. Referee: Terry Camilleri; Nirvana Cosmopolitan Hotel, Antalya, Turkey, 13 March 2022
Matthew Selt (25); England	4–**10**	**Judd Trump** (2); England
Afternoon: **67**–51, 1–**76**, **66**–1, 0–**120** (120), 21–**77**, 0–**82**, **81**–11, 40–**70**; Evening: 76–**113**, 0–**147** (147), 0–**98**, **63**–40, 7–**90**, 7–**114** (114)
61	Highest break	**147**
0	Century breaks	**3**

== Qualifying ==
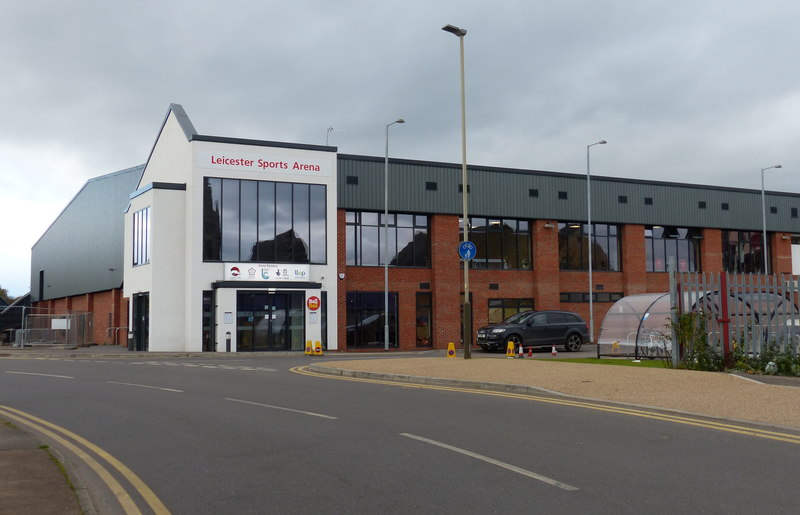
Qualifying took place at the Morningside Arena in Leicester, England (pictured in 2017).

Qualification for the tournament took place from 2 to 6 February 2022 at the Morningside Arena in Leicester, England. Four players withdrew from the tournament before the qualifying round had been completed: Robbie Williams, Noppon Saengkham, Mark Selby, and Neil Robertson. They were replaced by Dylan Emery, Mark Lloyd, Haydon Pinhey and Simon Blackwell respectively. Originally matches involving the top four seeds and two local Turkish players Ismail Türker and Enes Bakırcı were to be held over and played at the main venue. Robertson and Selby's matches were still held over, but contested by their replacements.

- Haydon Pinhey (ENG) 1–5 Wu Yize (CHN) (Note: Match was held over and played in Antalya.)
- Pang Junxu (CHN) 4–5 Aaron Hill (IRL)
- Lu Ning (CHN) 5–0 Lei Peifan (CHN)
- Mark King (ENG) 1–5 Zak Surety (ENG)
- Jack Lisowski (ENG) 5–1 David Lilley (ENG)
- Martin O'Donnell (ENG) 5–1 Michael Judge (IRL)
- Martin Gould (ENG) 5–4 Craig Steadman (ENG)
- David Grace (ENG) 5–2 Peter Lines (ENG)
- Liam Highfield (ENG) 2–5 Ashley Hugill (ENG)
- Jordan Brown (NIR) 5–2 Bai Langning (CHN)
- Thepchaiya Un-Nooh (THA) 5–0 Ismail Türker (TUR)
- Stephen Maguire (SCO) (9) 5–2 Zhao Jianbo (CHN)
- Alexander Ursenbacher (SUI) 5–1 James Cahill (ENG)
- Matthew Selt (ENG) 5–4 Zhang Anda (CHN)
- Sunny Akani (THA) 3–5 Michael White (WAL)
- Zhao Xintong (CHN) (8) 5–1 Louis Heathcote (ENG)
- John Higgins (SCO) (5) 5–3 Barry Pinches (ENG)
- Dylan Emery (WAL) 5–0 Alfie Burden (ENG)
- Gary Wilson (ENG) 4–5 Lukas Kleckers (GER)
- Michael Holt (ENG) 5–2 John Astley (ENG)
- Stuart Bingham (ENG) 3–5 Jackson Page (WAL)
- Mark Joyce (ENG) 3–5 Simon Lichtenberg (GER)
- Graeme Dott (SCO) 5–0 Sean Maddocks (ENG)
- Scott Donaldson (SCO) 5–3 Chen Zifan (CHN)
- Anthony Hamilton (ENG) 5–3 Ken Doherty (IRL)
- Tom Ford (ENG) 5–3 Hammad Miah (ENG)
- Dominic Dale (WAL) 2–5 Si Jiahui (CHN)
- Anthony McGill (SCO) 5–3 Jamie Clarke (WAL)
- Robert Milkins (ENG) 5–2 Nigel Bond (ENG)
- Ding Junhui (CHN) 5–2 Andrew Pagett (WAL)
- Tian Pengfei (CHN) 5–3 Allan Taylor (ENG)
- Kyren Wilson (ENG) (4) 5–0 Rory McLeod (JAM)
- Simon Blackwell (ENG) 4–5 Iulian Boiko (UKR)
- Andrew Higginson (ENG) 5–0 Jamie O'Neill (ENG)
- Xiao Guodong (CHN) 5–4 Xu Si (CHN)
- Mark Lloyd (ENG) 0–5 Oliver Lines (ENG)
- Yan Bingtao (CHN) 5–1 Steven Hallworth (ENG)
- Joe O'Connor (ENG) 5–2 Mitchell Mann (ENG)
- David Gilbert (ENG) 4–5 Andy Hicks (ENG)
- Elliot Slessor (ENG) 5–3 Duane Jones (WAL)
- Ben Woollaston (ENG) 5–1 Ian Burns (ENG)
- Hossein Vafaei (IRN) 5–0 Enes Bakırcı (TUR)
- Jak Jones (WAL) 5–1 Gerard Greene (NIR)
- Mark Allen (NIR) 5–2 Chang Bingyu (CHN)
- Jimmy Robertson (ENG) 5–1 Dean Young (SCO)
- Ryan Day (WAL) 0–5 Cao Yupeng (CHN)
- Lyu Haotian (CHN) 5–1 Fergal O'Brien (IRL)
- Shaun Murphy (ENG) (6) 5–2 Jimmy White (ENG)
- Mark Williams (WAL) (7) 5–1 Reanne Evans (ENG)
- Matthew Stevens (WAL) 5–1 Farakh Ajaib (PAK)
- Ali Carter (ENG) 5–4 Ben Hancorn (ENG)
- Jamie Jones (WAL) 5–2 Jamie Wilson (ENG)
- Barry Hawkins (ENG) 3–5 Yuan Sijun (CHN)
- Mark Davis (ENG) 5–2 Ross Muir (SCO)
- Ricky Walden (ENG) 5–3 Ashley Carty (ENG)
- Sam Craigie (ENG) 5–3 Sanderson Lam (ENG)
- Li Hang (CHN) 3–5 Fan Zhengyi (CHN)
- Zhou Yuelong (CHN) 5–2 Soheil Vahedi (IRN)
- Stuart Carrington (ENG) 5–2 Fraser Patrick (SCO)
- Luca Brecel (BEL) 5–1 Peter Devlin (ENG)
- Joe Perry (ENG) 5–1 Lee Walker (WAL)
- Liang Wenbo (CHN) 5–2 Zhang Jiankang (CHN)
- Chris Wakelin (ENG) 5–1 Gao Yang (CHN)
- Judd Trump (ENG) (2) 5–0 Michael Georgiou (CYP)

== Century breaks ==
=== Main venue centuries ===
A total of 50 century breaks were made during the main venue stage.

- 147, 120, 116, 114, 110 – Judd Trump
- 141, 128, 121, 106 – John Higgins
- 139 – Elliot Slessor
- 135, 133 – Ali Carter
- 135 – Graeme Dott
- 131, 127, 105, 105, 105, 102, 100 – Ding Junhui
- 131 – Robert Milkins
- 129 – Jak Jones
- 129 – Xiao Guodong
- 123, 105 – Martin Gould
- 123 – Lu Ning
- 121 – Tom Ford
- 120 – Mark Davis
- 119, 116 – Yan Bingtao
- 118, 104 – Matthew Selt
- 118 – Liang Wenbo
- 117 – Yuan Sijun
- 116, 100 – Kyren Wilson
- 113 – Oliver Lines
- 113 – Chris Wakelin
- 112 – Mark Allen
- 111, 107 – Wu Yize
- 106 – Shaun Murphy
- 106 – Si Jiahui
- 104 – Matthew Stevens
- 102, 101 – Hossein Vafaei
- 102 – Mark Williams
- 101 – Jordan Brown
- 101 – Jack Lisowski
- 101 – Thepchaiya Un-Nooh

=== Qualifying stage centuries ===
A total of 32 century breaks were made during qualification.

- 145 – Craig Steadman
- 142 – Elliot Slessor
- 141 – Scott Donaldson
- 138, 120 – Ding Junhui
- 137, 101 – Andrew Higginson
- 136 – Mark Davis
- 130 – John Higgins
- 129 – Joe Perry
- 127 – Michael White
- 122 – Dylan Emery
- 117, 102 – Luca Brecel
- 117 – Michael Holt
- 116, 112 – Tom Ford
- 114 – Ben Hancorn
- 114 – Jak Jones
- 113 – Xu Si
- 110, 109 – Jack Lisowski
- 107 – Chris Wakelin
- 106 – Chen Zifan
- 105, 101 – Zhao Xintong
- 104 – Li Hang
- 103, 101 – Stephen Maguire
- 101 – Jamie Wilson
- 101 – Yan Bingtao
- 100 – Ricky Walden

== Legacy ==
When the Turkish Masters was announced by the World Snooker Tour, it was planned to have an increasing prize fund each year until the 2024/25 season.

However, the 2023 Turkish Masters – which was scheduled to take place from 13 to 19 March of that year – was cancelled, because the local promoter could not guarantee adequate funding for the event. This cancellation came after the commercial body had already sent out forms to all professional players, asking them to register their intent to play in the tournament.

At the time of the cancellation announcement, it was stated that the 2024 edition would happen as expected: however, it was not included on the calendar for the season. Although a gap existed after the Players' Championship where the event may be held if the promoters could secure the funding needed, it did not feature in the 2023–24 season. The tournament has never shown up in subsequent seasons.
