= 2018 Macau Masters =

Tournament information
- Dates: 24–25 October 2018
- Venue: Ballroom, JW Marriott Hotel
- City: Macau
- Country: China
- Organisation: CBSA
- Format: Non-ranking team & Six-red Snooker event
- Highest break: (England) Barry Hawkins (68)

Final
- Champion: (England) Barry Hawkins
- Runner-up: (Wales) Mark Williams
- Score: 3–2

The 2018 Macau Masters was a non-ranking team and six-red snooker invitational event that took place on 24 and 25 October 2018. The event's team event was made up of two teams of four, competing in six games, with Team B defeating Team A with a score of 5–1. The event's six red singles knockout tournament was won by Barry Hawkins.

== Prize Fund ==
The event had a total prize fund of $100,000 awarded as follows:

=== Team event ===
- Winner: $50,000
- Runner-up $30,000

=== Six-red event ===
- Winner: $20,000

== Tournament teams ==
The event was made up of two teams of four, with players playing in six "best of 5" frames matches. Frames 1, 3 and 5 were doubles matches, whereas frames 2 and 4 were alternate singles.

| Team | Player 1 | Player 2 | Player 3 | Player 4 |
|---|---|---|---|---|
| Team A | (England) Joe Perry | (China) Zhang Anda | (Wales) Mark Williams | (Hong Kong) Marco Fu |
| Team B | (England) Barry Hawkins | (Wales) Ryan Day | (China) Zhao Xintong | (China) Zhou Yuelong |

== Results ==
=== Team event ===
The team event saw both teams field teams of two for individual team matches. Each player could only play with a partner for one match during the event.

| Team A (England) Joe Perry + (China) Zhang Anda | 1–3 | Team B (China) Zhao Xintong + (China) Zhou Yuelong |
| (China) Zhang Anda + (Wales) Mark Williams | 2–3 | (England) Barry Hawkins + (China) Zhao Xintong |
| (China) Zhang Anda + (Hong Kong) Marco Fu | 1–3 | (Wales) Ryan Day + (China) Zhao Xintong |
| (England) Joe Perry + (Wales) Mark Williams | 3–2 | (England) Barry Hawkins + (China) Zhou Yuelong |
| (England) Joe Perry + (Hong Kong) Marco Fu | 0–3 | (Wales) Ryan Day + (China) Zhou Yuelong |
| (Wales) Mark Williams + (Hong Kong) Marco Fu | 0–3 | (England) Barry Hawkins + (Wales) Ryan Day |

Team result

- Team A 1–5 Team B

=== Six-red event ===
To finish the event, the Six-Red Leapfrog Challenge took place. All 8-players played in a "killer" style match, with players required to win their match to continue on a winner stays on basis. The players were drawn based on world rankings. All matches were first to one frame of 6-red snooker, with the final being a best of 5 frame 6-red match.

| (China) Zhao Xintong | 1–0 | (China) Zhang Anda |
| (China) Zhou Yuelong | 1–0 | (China) Zhao Xintong |
| (China) Zhou Yuelong | 1–0 | (England) Joe Perry |
| (Hong Kong) Marco Fu | 1–0 | (China) Zhou Yuelong |
| (Hong Kong) Marco Fu | 1–0 | (Wales) Ryan Day |
| (England) Barry Hawkins | 1–0 | (Hong Kong) Marco Fu |

| | Final (Best of 5 frames) | |
|---|---|---|
| Barry Hawkins (England) | 3 – 2 | (Wales) Mark Williams |
