= Lyu Haotian =

Chinese snooker player (born 1997)

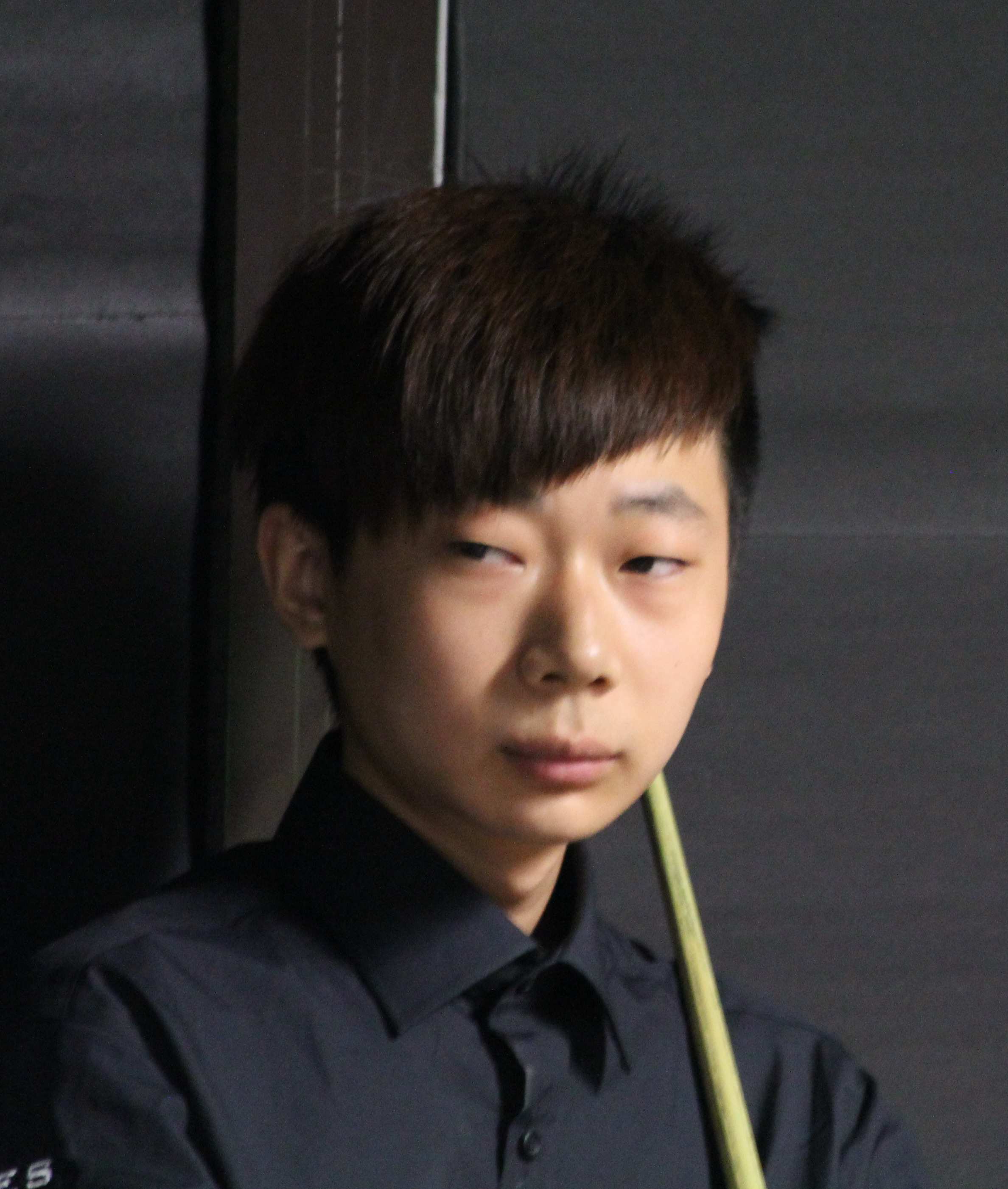
- Lyu at the Paul Hunter Classic in 2014

Personal information
- Born: 29 November 1997 (age 28) Tongzhou, Beijing, China

Sport
- Country: China
- Sport: Snooker
- Professional: 2013–2015, 2017–present
- Highest ranking: 24 (September 2019)
- Current ranking: 69 (as of 7 November 2026)
- Century breaks: 123 (as of 18 November 2026)
- Best ranking finish: Runner-up (2019 Indian Open)
Medal record
Men's Nine-ball
Representing China
Asian Indoor and Martial Arts Games
Gold medal – first place	2017 Ashgabat	Scotch doubles

Lyu Haotian
- Simplified Chinese: 吕昊天
- Traditional Chinese: 呂昊天
Transcriptions
Standard Mandarin
- Hanyu Pinyin: Lǚ Hàotiān
- IPA: [lỳ xâʊtʰjɛ́n]
Yue: Cantonese
- Yale Romanization: Léuih Houh Tīn
- Jyutping: Leoi⁵ Houh⁶ Tin¹

Lyu Haotian (Chinese: 吕昊天; born 29 November 1997) is a Chinese professional snooker player, notable for being one of the youngest snooker players to have played in professional tournaments, aged only 14. He reached the quarter-finals of the 2012 International Championship when he was aged 14, which is still the record in a ranking event.

== Career ==
=== Early career ===
Lyu Haotian began playing when he was 10 years old and attracted the attention of local coach Pang Weiguo, himself a former professional player. After 8 months he made his first century break. On November 28, 2009, the day before his 11th birthday, he became China's youngest U18 champion by defeating Lyu Chenwei 4-2.

Lyu first broke onto the professional snooker scene as a wildcard in the 2012 Haikou World Open, losing 4–5 to Tom Ford in the wildcard round. In his next tournament, the 2012 China Open, he lost again in the wildcard round 2–5 to Peter Ebdon.

=== 2012/2013 season ===
At the start of the 2012/2013 season Lyu won his first ever competitive match in a professional tournament by beating Qiu Yalong 4–1 in the first Asian Players Tour Championship. He then narrowly lost 3–4 to Tom Ford in the last 64. In the 2012 Shanghai Masters, at the age of 14, he became the youngest ever player to win a televised match by beating Marco Fu 5–4 in the wildcard round. He then lost 2–5 to Mark Allen in the first round.

At the 2012 International Championship in China he reached the quarter-finals with a 6–5 defeat of Dominic Dale of Wales in the last 16, before losing 2–6 to former world champion Neil Robertson. He thus became the youngest player ever to reach this stage of a ranking event.

Lyu followed up this result by winning the Chinese Youth Championship, beating Zhao Xintong 3-1 in the final.

In February 2013, he reached the first round of the 2013 World Open beating professional player Simon Bedford 5–2 in the wildcard round before losing 0–5 to Mark Selby. Lyu also reached the first round of the 2013 China Open courtesy of the withdrawal of Mark Joyce in the wildcard round. He lost 2–5 to Mark Williams.

In July, Lyu won the IBSF World Under-21 Snooker Championship, beating the Mongolian Zhu Yinghui 9-6, to receive a two-year card for the 2013/14 and 2014/15 seasons.

=== Professional debut ===
Lyu Haotian arrived in the UK as the youngest professional of the 2013-14 season, aged just 15. He stayed in Sheffield, playing at the STAR Academy. Lyu started his first season by beating Rod Lawler 5–2 to qualify for the Wuxi Classic where he faced Craig Steadman and won 5–3 to progress into the last 32. He was then whitewashed 5–0 by Ali Carter in the subsequent round. He also qualified for the Indian Open, but lost 4–1 to Thanawat Thirapongpaiboonin the first round.

Two of Lyu's flatmates, Thanawat Tirapongpaiboon and Passakorn Suwannawat, were suspended following an investigation into match fixing at the International Championship. The two players returned to Thailand, but 4 days later their house was set on fire in an arson attack. Lyu Haotian was unharmed, but the trauma had a significant effect on the 15-year old as he struggled to adapt to life in the UK. He became withdrawn and demotivated.

In October, Lyu reached the first final of his career at the minor-ranking Zhengzhou Open in his homeland. He beat the likes of 2006 world champion Graeme Dott and 2013 Shanghai Masters runner-up Xiao Guodong, before losing 4–0 to Liang Wenbo having been edged out of the opening two frames. Lyu was narrowly beaten 6–5 by Marcus Campbell in the first round of the UK Championship despite leading 3–1 at the interval. His final in Asia saw him qualify for the Players Tour Championship Finals for the first time and he lost 4–1 to Mark Williams in the opening round.

Lyu ended his debut season on the main tour ranked world number 93.

=== 2014/2015 season ===
At the UK Championship, Lyu defeated Cao Yupeng 6–4 before losing 6–1 to Marco Fu in the second round. He qualified for the Indian Open thanks to a 4–2 win over Dominic Dale and, after coming through a wildcard match in New Delhi, he was eliminated 4–1 in the first round by Tian Pengfei. Overall, Lyu could not recapture his form of last season as he won just two matches in three Asian Tour events and none in five European Tour events which contributed to his relegation from the snooker tour at the end of the season as he finished it 81st in the world rankings. In a subsequent interview he reflected he had been too young, and had become lonely and disoriented living in England without speaking much English.

=== 2015/2016 season ===
After the disappointment of relegation from the main tour, Lyu stopped playing snooker for 6 months. His boyhood coach, Pang Weiguo, persuaded him that at 18 he still had a future in the game, and Lyu resumed 9-ball Pool and snooker. He played in the Haining Open, where he overcame Mike Dunn 4–2, Sanderson Lam 4–1 and Ma Bing 4–2, before losing 4–1 to Ricky Walden in the fourth round.

In December 2015 Lyu played in the Chinese Youth Tour, losing to Zhou Yuelong in the quarter-finals.

In January, Lyu won the China City Snooker Club League singles title, beating Luo Honghao 5–0 in the final.

He entered Q School, but failed to win enough games to rejoin the tour.

=== 2016/2017 season ===
Lyu continued to achieve strong results in domestic snooker and 9-ball pool. On 12 January, Lyu made a maximum 147 break in a China City Snooker Club League match, playing for Zhejiang Jiaxing club.

Encouraged by Pang Weiguo, Lyu entered the 2017 Asian Championship, and on 28 April 2017 won the ACBS Asian Snooker Championship held in Doha, beating Pankaj Advani in the final 6–3. As a result, he qualified for the 2017-18 tour.

=== 2017/2018 season ===
Lyu's first wins came in qualifying rounds for the European Masters and the Shanghai Masters.

Lyu won a gold medal in the 2017 Asian Indoor and Martial Arts Games in Ashgabat, Turkmenistan, playing 9-ball pool scotch doubles with experienced partner Liu Haitao. Lyu also played in six-reds events in Ashgabat and Bangkok.

Returning to snooker, he narrowly lost 4–3 in the second round of the European Masters to world champion Mark Selby.

In the Northern Ireland Open, Lyu produced the best result of his career to date. With wins against Joe Swail, Yuan Sijun, Thepchaiya Un-Nooh, Liam Highfield and Tian Pengfei he progressed to the semi-final, where he lost to fellow Chinese teenager Yan Bingtao 6–2.

In the UK Championship, a trio of wins against experienced players Anthony Hamilton, Peter Ebdon and Marco Fu took him to the last 16, where he lost to Mark Joyce 6–4.

Lyu started 2018 with a win in the qualifying tournament for the China Open, against in-form player Ryan Day 6–3. In the main event he progressed to the last 16 with wins over Liam Highfield and Fergal O'Brien before losing to the eventual winner, World Champion Mark Selby.

At the qualifying for the 2018 World Snooker Championship he beat Fang Xiongman 10–8, before playing Martin O'Donnell. He fell behind 5–9, before winning 5 straight frames to take the match 10–9. In the final round he continued his run by beating Rory McLeod 10–2, winning the last 9 frames, to qualify for the main event at the Crucible for the first time.

At the Crucible he was drawn against Marco Fu, who had not competed for 4 months due to eye surgery. Lyu won the match 10–5, scoring two century breaks, becoming the youngest player to win a match at the Crucible since Ronnie O'Sullivan in 1995. In the second round he faced Barry Hawkins. Despite trailing 4-0 and 8–3, he levelled the scores at 9-9, but ultimately lost 13–10.

Lyu finished the season with £94000 prize money, ranking him 30th on the one-year list, and 61st on the official two-year list, easily the highest of all players in the first year of a new 2-year tour card.

Lyu Haotian was one of only two players (the other being Masters Champion Mark Allen) to reach the last-16 of the World Championship, UK Championship and China Open, the three most important ranking tournaments in the 2017–18 season.

=== 2018/2019 season ===
Lyu reached his second ranking semi-final in the China Championship, in Guangzhou in September, beating Joe Perry, Shaun Murphy and Martin O'Donnell, before losing 6–3 to John Higgins. After this, his form collapsed, losing 7 of his next 8 matches, his only win being against his practice partner Fan Zhengyi in the Scottish Open. However, at the Indian Open in March, he produced his best result to date, beating Zhou Yuelong, Luke Simmonds, Andy Hicks, Mark Davis and Anthony Hamilton to reach his first ranking final. However, after leading 3–2, he lost to Matthew Selt 5–3. The result lifted him into the top 32 in the rankings for the first time. In the World Championship, after rare a 10-0 demolition of Jordan Brown, he lost 10–8 to Mark Davis in the final qualifying round.

=== 2019/2020 season ===
Lyu's season was marred by technical issues, and some agonising losses. His best result came in the 2020 Snooker Shoot Out, where he reached the semi-final, losing to his flatmate Zhou Yuelong. Towards the end of the season he had wins against Mark Williams (in the Championship League) and Mark Selby (in the Gibraltar Open).

In March, the snooker season was suspended due to the COVID-19 outbreak and Lyu Haotian returned to China. He returned to the UK for the World Championship, but lost 6-2 to Eden Sharav. He finished the season ranked 43.

=== 2020/2021 season ===
Lyu's form improved from the previous season. He reached the third round of the European Masters, only losing narrowly to Ding Junhui. His best result came in the Scottish Open, in which he defeated Gary Wilson, Alan McManus, Akani Songsermsawad, before losing to the eventual champion Mark Selby.

In the inaugural WST Pro Series, Lyu Haotian qualified for the second stage, winning his first 6 mini-matches, including a 2–0 victory over reigning World Champion Ronnie O'Sullivan.

In the World Championship, Lyu beat fellow Chinese players Gao Yang and Chang Bingyu to qualify for the Crucible for a second time. However, his break-off shot in the first frame hit the blue, and his opponent Mark Allen cleared the table with a 139 break. This set the tone for the match, which was won by Allen 10–2. Lyu finished the season ranked 53.

=== 2021/2022 season ===
Lyu's results were again inconsistent. His best results were to reach the 3rd round on the Northern Ireland Open, beating Allister Carter and Mark King, and the 4th round of the Gibraltar Open, beating Allan Taylor, Ross Muir and Michael Georgiou.

In the World Championship Lyu Haotian had victories over Xu Si 6-4, Lu Ning 6-3 and Dominic Dale 10-4 to qualify for the main event at the Crucible Theatre for the third time. There he faced Stuart Bingham, but lost 10-5. Lyu finished the season ranked 45.

=== 2022/2023 season ===
Lyu had a strong start to the new season, reaching the last eight of the Championship League. He followed this up with a quarter-final at the 2022 British Open, and a run to the quarter-finals of the 2022 Northern Ireland Open, where he led 2-0 against Anthony McGill but went on to lose 5-3.

Lyu qualified for the 2022 UK Championship, where he lost 6-4 to Luca Brecel in the last 32. In the second half of the season, Lyu didn't have as much success in ranking events as he did at the beginning of the season. At the World Championship, he lost 10-8 to Mark Davis in the last 80, failing to qualify for the Crucible for the first time in three years.

== Personal life ==
Lyu Haotian lives in Sheffield where he practices at the Victoria Snooker Academy with Zhao Xintong, Yan Bingtao, Fan Zhengyi and several other players.

== Performance and rankings timeline ==
Tournament	2011/ 12	2012/ 13	2013/ 14	2014/ 15	2015/ 16	2016/ 17	2017/ 18	2018/ 19	2019/ 20	2020/ 21	2021/ 22	2022/ 23	2023/ 24	2024/ 25	2025/ 26	2026/ 27
Ranking (Note: It shows the ranking at the beginning of the season)	(Note: He was an amateur)		(Note: New players on the Main Tour don't have a ranking)	93				61	26	43	53	45	45	30	38	61
Ranking tournaments
Championship League	Non-Ranking Event									RR	A	3R	RR	A	RR	RR
China Open	WR	1R	LQ	LQ	A	A	3R	3R	Tournament Not Held							LQ
Wuhan Open	Tournament Not Held												SF	LQ	1R	LQ
British Open	Tournament Not Held										1R	QF	1R	3R	LQ	3R
English Open	Tournament Not Held					A	2R	1R	1R	1R	LQ	LQ	LQ	2R	LQ	1R
Shenzhen Open (Note: The event was called the Xi'an Grand Prix (2024/2025–2025/2026))	Tournament Not Held													2R	QF	LQ
Northern Ireland Open	Tournament Not Held					A	SF	1R	1R	1R	3R	QF	2R	1R	LQ	LQ
International Championship	NH	QF	LQ	LQ	A	A	LQ	LQ	LQ	Not Held			3R	3R	1R	1R
UK Championship	A	A	1R	2R	A	A	4R	1R	2R	2R	1R	1R	LQ	LQ	1R	
Shoot Out	Non-Ranking Event					A	2R	1R	SF	4R	1R	1R	1R	2R	WD	
Scottish Open	NH	MR	Not Held			A	1R	2R	1R	4R	LQ	1R	3R	1R	WD	
German Masters	A	A	LQ	LQ	A	A	LQ	LQ	LQ	LQ	1R	LQ	LQ	1R	LQ	LQ
Welsh Open	A	A	1R	1R	A	A	2R	1R	2R	1R	LQ	LQ	LQ	1R	LQ	
World Grand Prix	Not Held			NR	DNQ	DNQ	DNQ	DNQ	DNQ	DNQ	DNQ	1R	2R	DNQ	DNQ	
Players Championship (Note: The event was called the Players Tour Championship Grand Final (2011/2012–2015/2016))	DNQ	DNQ	1R	DNQ	DNQ	DNQ	DNQ	DNQ	DNQ	DNQ	DNQ	DNQ	DNQ	DNQ	DNQ	
World Open	WR	1R	LQ	Not Held		A	A	1R	1R	Not Held			2R	1R	1R	
Tour Championship	Tournament Not Held							DNQ	DNQ	DNQ	DNQ	DNQ	DNQ	DNQ	DNQ	
World Championship	A	A	LQ	LQ	A	A	2R	LQ	LQ	1R	1R	LQ	1R	LQ	LQ	
Non-ranking tournaments
Shanghai Masters	Ranking Event							A	1R	Not Held			A	1R	A	
Championship League	A	A	A	A	A	A	A	A	RR	A	A	RR	A	A	A	
Former ranking tournaments
Wuxi Classic	NR	WR	2R	LQ	Tournament Not Held											
Australian Goldfields Open	A	A	LQ	LQ	A	Tournament Not Held										
Shanghai Masters	A	1R	LQ	LQ	A	A	1R	Non-Ranking		Not Held			Non-Ranking Event			
Indian Open	Not Held		1R	1R	NH	A	LQ	F	Tournament Not Held							
Riga Masters (Note: The event was called the Riga Open (2014/2015–2015/2016))	Not Held			Minor-Ranking		A	LQ	LQ	2R	Tournament Not Held						
China Championship	Tournament Not Held					NR	LQ	SF	1R	Tournament Not Held						
WST Pro Series	Tournament Not Held									2R	Tournament Not Held					
Turkish Masters	Tournament Not Held										1R	Tournament Not Held				
Gibraltar Open	Tournament Not Held				MR	A	A	A	4R	1R	4R	Tournament Not Held				
WST Classic	Tournament Not Held											3R	Tournament Not Held			
European Masters	Tournament Not Held					A	2R	LQ	1R	3R	LQ	1R	QF	Not Held		
Saudi Arabia Masters	Tournament Not Held													4R	3R	NH
Former non-ranking tournaments
Six-red World Championship	NH	A	A	A	A	A	RR	A	A	Not Held		LQ	Tournament Not Held			
Haining Open	Not Held			Minor-Ranking		3R	4R	A	A	NH	A	A	Tournament Not Held			

Performance Table Legend
LQ	lost in the qualifying draw	#R	lost in the early rounds of the tournament (WR = Wildcard round, RR = Round robin)	QF	lost in the quarter-finals
SF	lost in the semi-finals	F	lost in the final	W	won the tournament
DNQ	did not qualify for the tournament	A	did not participate in the tournament	WD	withdrew from the tournament

NH / Not Held	means an event was not held.
NR / Non-Ranking Event	means an event is/was no longer a ranking event.
R / Ranking Event	means an event is/was a ranking event.
MR / Minor-Ranking Event	means an event is/was a minor-ranking event.

== Career finals ==
=== Ranking finals: 1 ===
Outcome	No.	Year	Championship	Opponent in the final	Score
Runner-up	1.	2019	Indian Open	(England) Matthew Selt	3–5

=== Minor-ranking finals: 1 ===
Outcome	No.	Year	Championship	Opponent in the final	Score
Runner-up	1	2013	Zhengzhou Open	(China) Liang Wenbo	0–4

=== Amateur finals: 2 (2 titles) ===
Outcome	No.	Year	Championship	Opponent in the final	Score
Winner	1	2012	World Under-21 Snooker Championship	(China) Zhu Yinghui	9–6
Winner	2	2017	Asian Amateur Championship	(India) Pankaj Advani	6–3
