= 2020 Snooker Shoot Out =

Snooker tournament

2020 BetVictor Snooker Shoot Out

Tournament information
- Dates: 20–23 February 2020
- Venue: Watford Colosseum
- City: Watford
- Country: England
- Organisation: World Snooker Tour
- Format: Ranking event
- Total prize fund: £171,000
- Winner's share: £50,000
- Highest break: Thor Chuan Leong (MAS) (133)

Final
- Champion: Michael Holt (ENG)
- Runner-up: Zhou Yuelong (CHN)
- Score: 64–1 (one frame)

The 2020 Shoot Out (officially the 2020 BetVictor Snooker Shoot Out) was a professional ranking snooker tournament held from 20 to 23 February 2020 at the Watford Colosseum in Watford, England. It was the 13th ranking event of the 2019–20 snooker season. It was played under a variation of the standard rules of snooker. The event was the third of four events sponsored by BetVictor, making up the 2020 European Series.

The defending champion was Thailand's Thepchaiya Un-Nooh, who defeated England's Michael Holt 74–0 in the 2019 final. In 2020, Un-Nooh was beaten by Peter Lines in the second round. For the second consecutive year, Holt reached the final, where he defeated Zhou Yuelong 64–1. There were four century breaks during the event, the highest being a 133 by Thor Chuan Leong. There was a prize fund of £171,000, £50,000 of which was awarded to the winner.

== Format ==
The 2020 Snooker Shoot Out professional snooker tournament was held at the Watford Colosseum in Watford, England, between 20 and 23 February 2020. It was the 10th edition of the Snooker Shoot Out tournament, the first of which was held in 1990 as the 1990 Shoot-Out. The 2020 iteration is the 13th ranking event of the 2019–20 snooker season following the World Grand Prix and preceding the Players Championship. Each match in the Snooker Shoot Out is played over a single frame. The 2020 event had 128 participants from the World Snooker Tour and additional players were selected as wildcard entries. The event was organised by the World Professional Billiards and Snooker Association (WPSA) and the World Snooker Tour.

The tournament was played using a variation of the traditional snooker rules. The draw was randomised before each round. All matches were played over a single frame, each of which lasted up to 10 minutes. The event featured a variable shot clock; shots played in the first five minutes were allowed 15 seconds while the final five had a 10-second timer. All foul shots award the opponent a ball in hand. Unlike traditional snooker, if a ball does not hit a cushion on every shot, it is a foul. Rather than a coin toss, a lag is used to choose which player breaks. In the event of a draw, each player receives a shot at the blue ball this is known as a "blue ball shootout". The player who pots the ball with the cue ball from inside the D and the blue ball on its spot with the opponent missing wins the match. The event was broadcast by Eurosport.

=== Prize fund ===
The event had a prize fund of £171,000, of which the winner received £50,000. The event was the third of the "European Series", all of which were sponsored by BetVictor. The other tournaments in the series were the European Masters, German Masters and Gibraltar Open. The player accumulating the most prize money over the four events received a bonus of £150,000. The breakdown of prize money for this year is shown below:

- Winner: £50,000
- Runner-up: £20,000
- Semi-final: £8,000
- Quarter-final: £4,000
- Last 16: £2,000
- Last 32: £1,000
- Last 64: £500
- Last 128: £250 (prize money at this stage did not count towards the world rankings)
- Highest break: £5,000
- Total: £171,000

== Summary ==
=== Early rounds ===
The 2020 Snooker Shoot Out began on 20 February and the first round was played during the first two days. The tournament's opening match featured defending champion Thepchaiya Un-Nooh, who had defeated Michael Holt in the final of the 2019 event. Un-Nooh defeated Maltese player Alex Borg 63–17. The match between Daniel Wells and Bai Langning finished at 72–72 and Wells won the blue-ball shootout. Despite trailing 37–1 to Alfie Burden, Soheil Vahedi made a break of 36 to force a shootout, which he won. Three-time world champion Mark Selby lost in the opening round to Sunny Akani 54–18 while reigning world seniors champion Jimmy White lost to Matthew Stevens 71–39. Three amateur players qualified for the second round of the competition; Scotland's Dean Young defeated David Grace 35–29 and Irish player Ross Bulman defeated 2018 Snooker Shoot Out winner Michael Georgiou 21–28. In an all-amateur first-round match, 15 year-old Robbie McGuigan was defeated 15–50 by European under-18 champion Aaron Hill.

Two female players were invited into the draw. Nutcharut Wongharuthai played one shot in her match against Thor Chuan Leong, who made a total clearance, scoring 133, the highest break of the event. Twelve-time women's world champion Reanne Evans also lost in the first round to Ian Burns. The 2019 Snooker Shoot Out runner-up Michael Holt played Amine Amiri, who had not won a frame on tour all season. Amiri was ahead but failed to realise every shot must hit a cushion. He played a roll-up on two occasions, awarding 14 points to Holt and allowing Holt to win 69–38.

The second round of the tournament was held on 22 February. Defending champion Thepchaiya Un-Nooh was defeated by Peter Lines 11–79. Ronnie O'Sullivan, who had entered the event for the first time since 2015, lost 66–30 to Billy Joe Castle. The Masters finalist Ali Carter was defeated by Brandon Sargeant 63–68. All three amateur players won their second-round matches; Aaron Hill defeated world number eight Kyren Wilson with a break of 47, Dean Young defeated Liam Highfield and Ross Bulman beat Andrew Pagett. Anthony Hamilton defeated top-16 player David Gilbert 62–50.

=== Later rounds ===
The remaining rounds were played on 23 February. The final day featured the remaining 32 players playing in four rounds with a break between each round. Two top-16 players, Jack Lisowski and Barry Hawkins lost in the third round to Zhou Yuelong and Ben Woollaston respectively. Lyu Haotian made a half-century break before Soheil Vahedi needed a clearance to win the match; he missed a shot on the yellow ball and lost 47–64. All three amateur players remaining lost in the third round.

The fourth round began with 2017 winner Anthony McGill defeating Shaun Murphy. Woollaston completed a whitewash of Jamie Clarke 96–0. In a frame consisting of only 34 points, Mei Xiwen defeated Mike Dunn 22–12. The semi-final lineup included three Chinese players; Zhou Yuelong defeated Xiwen, Lyu Haotan defeated Anthony McGill, and Yan Bingtao defeated Anthony Hamilton. The other semi-finalist was Michael Holt, who defeated Ben Woollaston 19–7. The semi-finals were played from 9 pm; in the first match, Michael Holt defeated Yan Bingtao 59–16. The second semi-final finished with a 44–33 win for Zhou Yuelong over Lyu Haotian.

The final was played between Michael Holt and Zhou Yuelong, both of whom were playing in their second ranking final; Holt had reached the event final the previous year while Zhou had reached the 2020 European Masters final earlier in the season. The winner of the Shoot Out progressed to the Players Championships that followed it. Holt scored a break of 42 and won the final 64–1; This was Holt's first full ranking event victory in his 24-year professional career. He said the tournament's format allowed him to "play on my instinct and then play my best".

== Tournament draw ==
All times in Greenwich Mean Time. Times for quarter-finals, semi-finals and final are approximate. Players in bold denote match winners.

=== Round 1 ===
==== 20 February – 13:00 ====
- Alex Borg (MLT) 17–**63** **Thepchaiya Un-Nooh** (THA)
- Sean Maddocks (ENG) 15–**43** **Igor Figueiredo** (BRA)
- **Kurt Maflin** (NOR) **103**–29 Yuan Sijun (CHN)
- **Dominic Dale** (WAL) **30**–26 Mitchell Mann (ENG)
- **David Lilley** (ENG) **41**–39 Gary Wilson (ENG)
- **Zhang Anda** (CHN) **37**–21 Fan Zhengyi (CHN)
- **Mark Davis** (ENG) **61**–1 Harvey Chandler (ENG)
- Iulian Boiko (UKR) 0–**120** **Chang Bingyu** (CHN)
- **Mark Williams** (WAL) **59**–7 Luca Brecel (BEL)
- Bai Langning (CHN) 72–**77** **Daniel Wells** (WAL) (Note: Daniel Wells defeated Bai Langning in a sudden death blue ball shootout after the match finished level at 72–72.)
- Si Jiahui (CHN) 63–**68** **Xiao Guodong** (CHN)
- David Grace (ENG) 29–**35** **Dean Young** (SCO)
- Mark Joyce (ENG) 26–**46** **Chris Wakelin** (ENG)
- **Nigel Bond** (ENG) **62**–0 Gerard Greene (NIR)
- **Zhao Xintong** (CHN) **70**–24 Lukas Kleckers (GER)
- **Sunny Akani** (THA) **54**–18 Mark Selby (ENG)

==== 20 February – 19:00 ====
- **Kyren Wilson** (ENG) **28**–24 Michael White (WAL)
- Louis Heathcote (ENG) 10–**49** **Jamie Clarke** (WAL)
- **Anthony McGill** (SCO) **69**–19 Zhang Jiankang (CHN)
- **Liam Highfield** (ENG) **89**–33 James Cahill (ENG)
- **Andrew Pagett** (WAL) **46**–41 Stuart Bingham (ENG)
- **Ashley Hugill** (ENG) **33**–9 Jamie O'Neill (ENG)
- **Mei Xiwen** (CHN) **22**–17 Matthew Selt (ENG)
- **Thor Chuan Leong** (MAS) **133**–0 Nutcharut Wongharuthai (THA)
- Mark Allen (NIR) 8–**54** **Luo Honghao** (CHN)
- **Li Hang** (CHN) **58**–44 Adam Stefanow (POL)
- **Lyu Haotian** (CHN) **52**–35 Riley Parsons (ENG)
- Paul Davison (ENG) 21–**36** **Anthony Hamilton** (ENG)
- Robert Milkins (ENG) 0–**39** **David Gilbert** (ENG)
- Simon Lichtenberg (GER) 3–**60** **Lei Peifan** (CHN)
- Joe O'Connor (ENG) 31–**64** **Elliot Slessor** (ENG)
- Jimmy White (ENG) 30–**71** **Matthew Stevens** (WAL)

==== 21 February – 13:00 ====
- **Shaun Murphy** (ENG) **77**–0 Kishan Hirani (WAL)
- **Soheil Vahedi** (IRN) **42**–37 Alfie Burden (ENG) (Note: Soheil Vahedi defeated Alfie Burden in a sudden death blue ball shootout after the match finished level at 37–37.)
- **Ben Woollaston** (ENG) **41**–23 Duane Jones (WAL)
- Robbie McGuigan (NIR) 15–**50** **Aaron Hill** (IRL)
- Scott Donaldson (SCO) 35–**67** **Jordan Brown** (NIR)
- Michael Georgiou (CYP) 21–**28** **Ross Bulman** (IRL)
- Ricky Walden (ENG) 61–**71** **Tian Pengfei** (CHN)
- Lee Walker (WAL) 30–**37** **Lu Ning** (CHN)
- Chen Zifan (CHN) 50–**56** **Ali Carter** (ENG)
- Martin Gould (ENG) 8–**74** **Andrew Higginson** (ENG)
- Amine Amiri (MAR) 38–**69** **Michael Holt** (ENG)
- **Craig Steadman** (ENG) **44**–27 Hammad Miah (ENG)
- **Jack Lisowski** (ENG) **79**–10 Andy Hicks (ENG)
- Hossein Vafaei (IRN) 41–**61** **Alexander Ursenbacher** (SUI)
- **Martin O'Donnell** (ENG) **58**–27 Rod Lawler (ENG)
- **Ian Burns** (ENG) **69**–8 Reanne Evans (ENG)

==== 21 February – 19:00 ====
- Kacper Filipiak (POL) 41–**64** **Ken Doherty** (IRL)
- Barry Pinches (ENG) 6–**117** **Ryan Day** (WAL)
- Tom Ford (ENG) 27–**65** **Zhou Yuelong** (CHN)
- Andy Lee (HKG) 0–**69** **Billy Castle** (ENG)
- Xu Si (CHN) 1–**42** **Yan Bingtao** (CHN)
- Sam Baird (ENG) 36–**48** **Jak Jones** (WAL)
- Noppon Saengkham (THA) 43–**46** **Ashley Carty** (ENG)
- **Mike Dunn** (ENG) **41**–29 John Astley (ENG)
- Jackson Page (WAL) 7–**77** **Barry Hawkins** (ENG)
- **Brandon Sargeant** (ENG) **62**–7 Eden Sharav (ISR)
- **Liang Wenbo** (CHN) **34**–29 Oliver Lines (ENG)
- Fergal O'Brien (IRL) 41–**56** **Chen Feilong** (CHN)
- Jimmy Robertson (ENG) 7–**35** **Joe Perry** (ENG)
- **Fraser Patrick** (SCO) **56**–7 Stuart Carrington (ENG)
- **Peter Lines** (ENG) **58**–16 Sam Craigie (ENG)
- Alan McManus (SCO) 10–**54** **Ronnie O'Sullivan** (ENG)

=== Round 2 ===
==== 22 February – 13:00 ====
- **Aaron Hill** (IRL) **55**–11 Kyren Wilson (ENG)
- Liam Highfield (ENG) 0–**61** **Dean Young** (SCO)
- **Jamie Clarke** (WAL) **53**–38 Lu Ning (CHN)
- **Anthony Hamilton** (ENG) **62**–50 David Gilbert (ENG)
- **Lyu Haotian** (CHN) **57**–25 Mark Davis (ENG)
- Thor Chuan Leong (MAS) 15–**70** **Yan Bingtao** (CHN)
- **Lei Peifan** (CHN) **30**–28 Kurt Maflin (NOR)
- Andrew Higginson (ENG) 8–**73** **Zhou Yuelong** (CHN)
- David Lilley (ENG) 8–**72** **Barry Hawkins** (ENG)
- Tian Pengfei (CHN) 16–**39** **Sunny Akani** (THA)
- **Soheil Vahedi** (IRN) **42**–2 Daniel Wells (WAL)
- Andrew Pagett (WAL) 26–**42** **Ross Bulman** (IRL)
- **Mike Dunn** (ENG) **47**–0 Matthew Stevens (WAL)
- Dominic Dale (WAL) 17–**83** **Anthony McGill** (SCO)
- **Ian Burns** (ENG) **49**–43 Chang Bingyu (CHN)
- Mark Williams (WAL) 36–**54** **Ashley Carty** (ENG)

==== 22 February – 19:00 ====
- Thepchaiya Un-Nooh (THA) 11–**79** **Peter Lines** (ENG)
- Ali Carter (ENG) 63–**68** **Brandon Sargeant** (ENG)
- **Xiao Guodong** (CHN) **101**–4 Ashley Hugill (ENG)
- **Luo Honghao** (CHN) **100**–19 Igor Figueiredo (BRA)
- **Liang Wenbo** (CHN) **53**–44 Martin O'Donnell (ENG)
- **Jack Lisowski** (ENG) **54**–44 Fraser Patrick (SCO)
- **Zhang Anda** (CHN) **62**–19 Ken Doherty (IRL)
- Nigel Bond (ENG) 23–**58** **Mei Xiwen** (CHN)
- **Billy Castle** (ENG) **66**–30 Ronnie O'Sullivan (ENG)
- **Li Hang** (CHN) **40**–28 Chen Feilong (CHN)
- Elliot Slessor (ENG) 2–**62** **Michael Holt** (ENG)
- Ryan Day (WAL) 39–**44** **Joe Perry** (ENG)
- **Jak Jones** (WAL) **111**–1 Jordan Brown (NIR)
- Zhao Xintong (CHN) 46–**64** **Ben Woollaston** (ENG)
- **Craig Steadman** (ENG) **52**–26 Chris Wakelin (ENG)
- Alexander Ursenbacher (SUI) 19–**86** **Shaun Murphy** (ENG)

=== Round 3 ===
==== 23 February – 13:00 ====
- **Zhou Yuelong** (CHN) **65**–8 Jack Lisowski (ENG)
- Liang Wenbo (CHN) 41–**61** **Anthony McGill** (SCO)
- Ashley Carty (ENG) 20–**56** **Mike Dunn** (ENG)
- **Anthony Hamilton** (ENG) **73**–0 Ross Bulman (IRL)
- Brandon Sargeant (ENG) 21–**44** **Shaun Murphy** (ENG)
- **Lyu Haotian** (CHN) **64**–47 Soheil Vahedi (IRN)
- Aaron Hill (IRL) 2–**63** **Craig Steadman** (ENG)
- Jak Jones (WAL) 16–**28** **Peter Lines** (ENG)
- Barry Hawkins (ENG) 15–**54** **Ben Woollaston** (ENG)
- **Jamie Clarke** (WAL) **47**–11 Li Hang (CHN)
- **Zhang Anda** (CHN) **31**–6 Xiao Guodong (CHN)
- **Yan Bingtao** (CHN) **73**–17 Dean Young (SCO)
- Ian Burns (ENG) 15–**38** **Michael Holt** (ENG)
- Luo Honghao (CHN) 2–**51** **Billy Castle** (ENG)
- Lei Peifan (CHN) 6–**21** **Mei Xiwen** (CHN)
- Sunny Akani (THA) 25–**62** **Joe Perry** (ENG)

=== Round 4 ===
==== 23 February – 19:00 ====
- Shaun Murphy (ENG) 38–**48** **Anthony McGill** (SCO)
- **Lyu Haotian** (CHN) **34**–32 Zhang Anda (CHN)
- Craig Steadman (ENG) 15–**42** **Yan Bingtao** (CHN)
- Billy Castle (ENG) 39–**77** **Zhou Yuelong** (CHN)
- **Ben Woollaston** (ENG) **96**–0 Jamie Clarke (WAL)
- **Mei Xiwen** (CHN) **22**–12 Mike Dunn (ENG)
- Peter Lines (ENG) 23–**48** **Anthony Hamilton** (ENG)
- Joe Perry (ENG) 24–**67** **Michael Holt** (ENG)

=== Quarter-finals ===
==== 23 February – 21:00 ====
- Mei Xiwen (CHN) 18–**38** **Zhou Yuelong** (CHN)
- Ben Woollaston (ENG) 7–**19** **Michael Holt** (ENG)
- **Lyu Haotian** (CHN) **45**–33 Anthony McGill (SCO)
- Anthony Hamilton (ENG) 9–**35** **Yan Bingtao** (CHN)

=== Semi-finals ===
==== 23 February – 22:15 ====
- **Michael Holt** (ENG) **59**–16 Yan Bingtao (CHN)
- **Zhou Yuelong** (CHN) **44**–33 Lyu Haotian (CHN)

=== Final ===
Final: 1 frame. Referee: Kevin Dabrowski; Watford Colosseum, Watford, England, 23 February 2020 – 22:45
**Michael Holt**; England	**64**–1	Zhou Yuelong; China

== Century breaks ==
A total of four century breaks were made during the event.

- 133 – Thor Chuan Leong
- 120 – Chang Bingyu
- 107 – Jak Jones
- 101 – Xiao Guodong
