= 2020 European Masters (2020–21 season) =

Snooker tournament held in September 2020

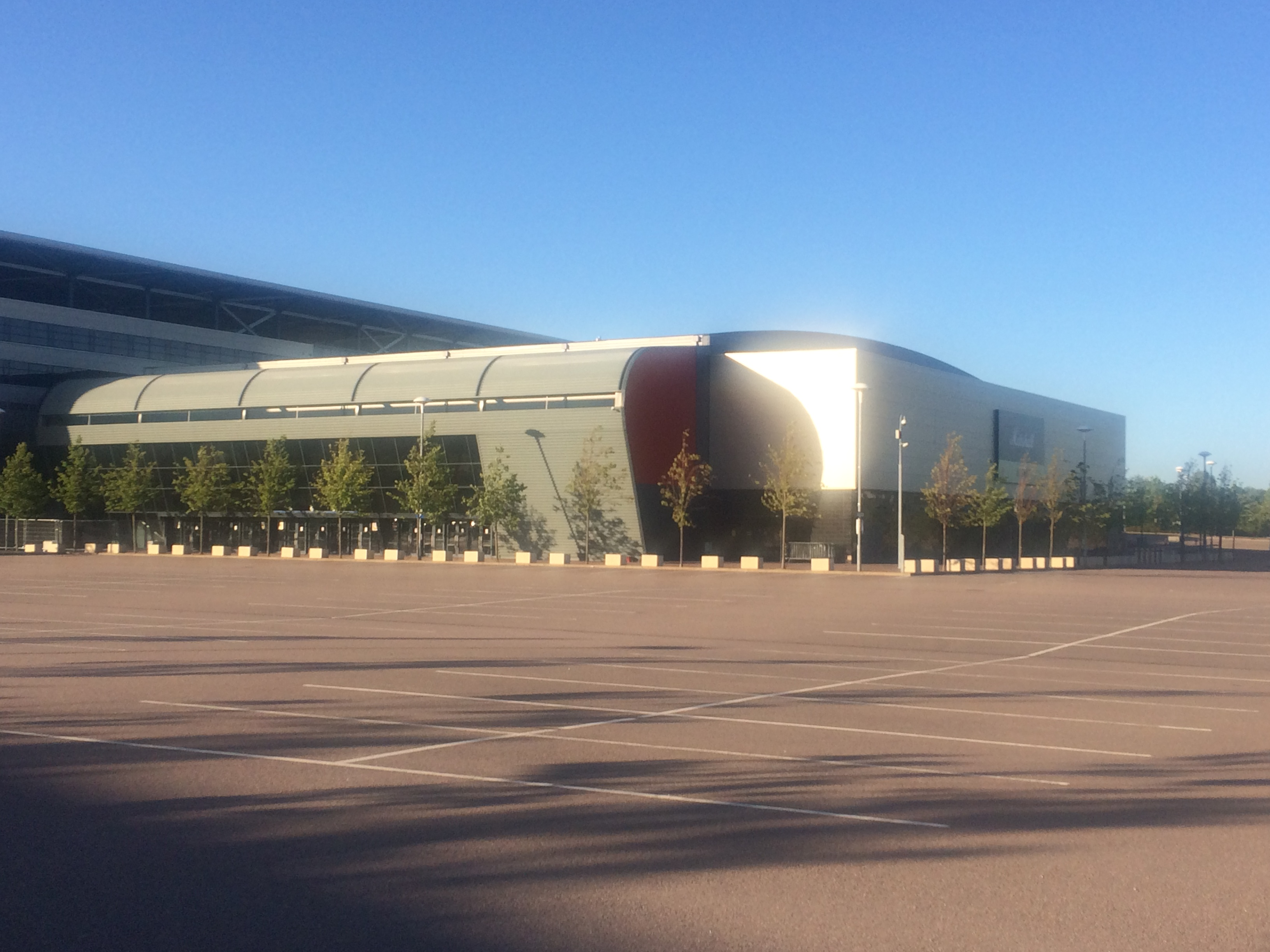
- The Marshall Arena in Milton Keynes, England

Tournament information
- Dates: 21–27 September 2020
- Venue: Marshall Arena, Stadium MK
- City: Milton Keynes
- Country: England
- Organisation: World Snooker Tour
- Format: Ranking event
- Total prize fund: £407,000
- Winner's share: £80,000
- Highest break: Mark Allen (NIR) (145)

Final
- Champion: Mark Selby (ENG)
- Runner-up: Martin Gould (ENG)
- Score: 9–8

The 2020 European Masters was a professional ranking snooker tournament which took place from 21 to 27 September 2020 at the Marshall Arena in Milton Keynes, England. Organised by the World Professional Billiards and Snooker Association, it was the first completed ranking event of the 2020–21 season. The competition was the 22nd edition of the European Masters, first held in 1989 and the second held in 2020 after the January 2020 European Masters. The event featured 128 participants with five withdrawing from the event due to COVID-19 and another (Mark Davis) because of his snooker cue being stolen. The winner of the event won £80,000 from a total prize fund of £407,000. The event was sponsored by betting company BetVictor.

Neil Robertson was the defending champion, having defeated Zhou Yuelong in a 9–0 whitewash in the previous season's final. However, Robertson was defeated 4–5 by Shaun Murphy in the quarter-finals. Mark Selby won the event after he defeated Martin Gould on a deciding frame 9–8. There were 98 century breaks made during the tournament, the highest of which was a 145 made by Mark Allen. He also equalled the most consecutive century breaks, scoring four in succession in his 5–0 second round win over Ken Doherty.

== Format ==
The September 2020 European Masters was a professional snooker tournament and the second tournament of the 2020–21 snooker season. The event was played between 21 and 27 September 2020 at the Marshall Arena in Milton Keynes, England. The arena will host the first eight tournaments of the season with events being moved to help reduce the spread during the COVID-19 pandemic. This was the 22nd edition of the European Masters tournament, the first having been held as the European Open in 1989. It was the second European Masters tournament to take place in 2020, after the 2020 European Masters held between 22 and 26 January was won by Neil Robertson who defeated Zhou Yuelong 9–0 in the final.

The event featured 128 competitors with 124 participants from the World Snooker Tour with four additional places given to the four highest ranked players from continental Europe on the 2020 Q School Order of Merit. Matches at the event were played as the best-of-9 frames until the semi-finals – played as best-of-11 – and final, a best-of-17 played over two sessions.

=== Prize fund ===
The event had a total prize fund of £407,000 with the winner receiving £80,000. This was the same as that of the previous event in 2020. A breakdown of prize money for the event is shown below:

- Winner: £80,000
- Runner-up: £35,000
- Semi-final: £17,500
- Quarter-final: £11,000
- Last 16: £6,000
- Last 32: £4,000
- Last 64: £3,000
- Highest break: £5,000
- Total: £407,000

== Summary ==
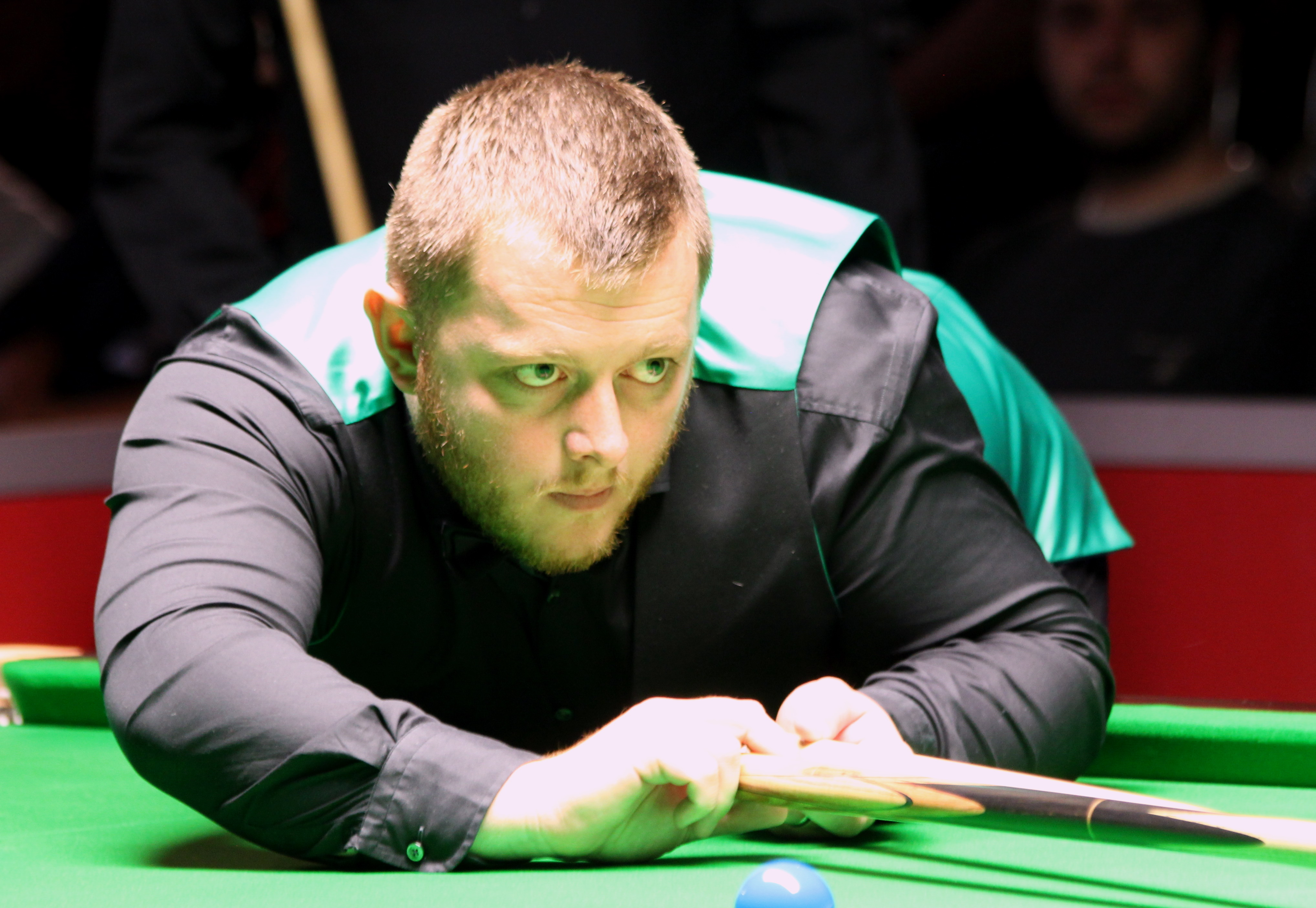
Mark Allen made four consecutive century breaks in a 5–0 win over Ken Doherty.

The tournament began on 21 September 2020. During the first round, the World Snooker Tour announced that two players had tested positive for COVID-19. The players, Daniel Wells and Gary Wilson withdrew from the event. A further three players also withdrew as Elliot Slessor and David Lilley had both been in contact with Wilson, while Michael White came into proximity to Wells. Having received a walkover in the first round, the 2020 World Snooker Championship winner Ronnie O'Sullivan met new professional Aaron Hill. Hill took a lead of 3–1 before O'Sullivan won three frames to lead. Hill won the next two frames to win the match 5–4. Hill suggested that comments made by O'Sullivan about the quality of newer players inspired his performance. Hill commented that they were at the "back of [his] mind" during the match and "that one day I am going to show him what I can do. I think today was the day."

Newly professional player Peter Devlin defeated three-time world champion Mark Williams 5–4. Devlin made his first professional century break in the deciding frame of the match. In his second round 5–0 win over Ken Doherty, Mark Allen made breaks of 134, 101, 141 and 145 in a row. This was only the sixth time a player had made four consecutive century breaks in a professional match. It was also his seventh century in his first two matches.

Mark Davis withdrew ahead of his third round match with Mark Selby. His snooker cue was stolen after he left it resting against his car after leaving the hotel. Davis offered a £1,000 reward for the return of the cue, which he had played with for more than 20 years. Cue manufacturer John Parris also offered a new cue to be made as a reward for its return. Davis' cue was returned before the end of the tournament. This was Selby's second walkover of the tournament, having also been drawn against Michael White. In the fourth round, Selby was 1–4 behind against Stuart Bingham but made four breaks above 50 to win the match 5–4.

The quarter-finals and semi-finals were played on 26 September 2020. Two-time winner Judd Trump took a 4–0 lead over Kyren Wilson in the quarter-finals and eventually won 5–2, whilst defending champion Neil Robertson lost to Shaun Murphy on a deciding frame. Ding Junhui won only one frame as he was defeated by Mark Selby 1–5. The final quarter-final went to a deciding frame as Martin Gould defeated Yan Bingtao 5–4. Both semi-finals were also played on the 26 September, but as the best-of-11 frames. Selby met Murphy in a match and took a 5–1 lead, but missed chances in the next two frames before winning the match 6–3. The other semi-final saw Gould defeat world number one Trump by the same scoreline to reach his first ranking final since the 2016 German Masters.

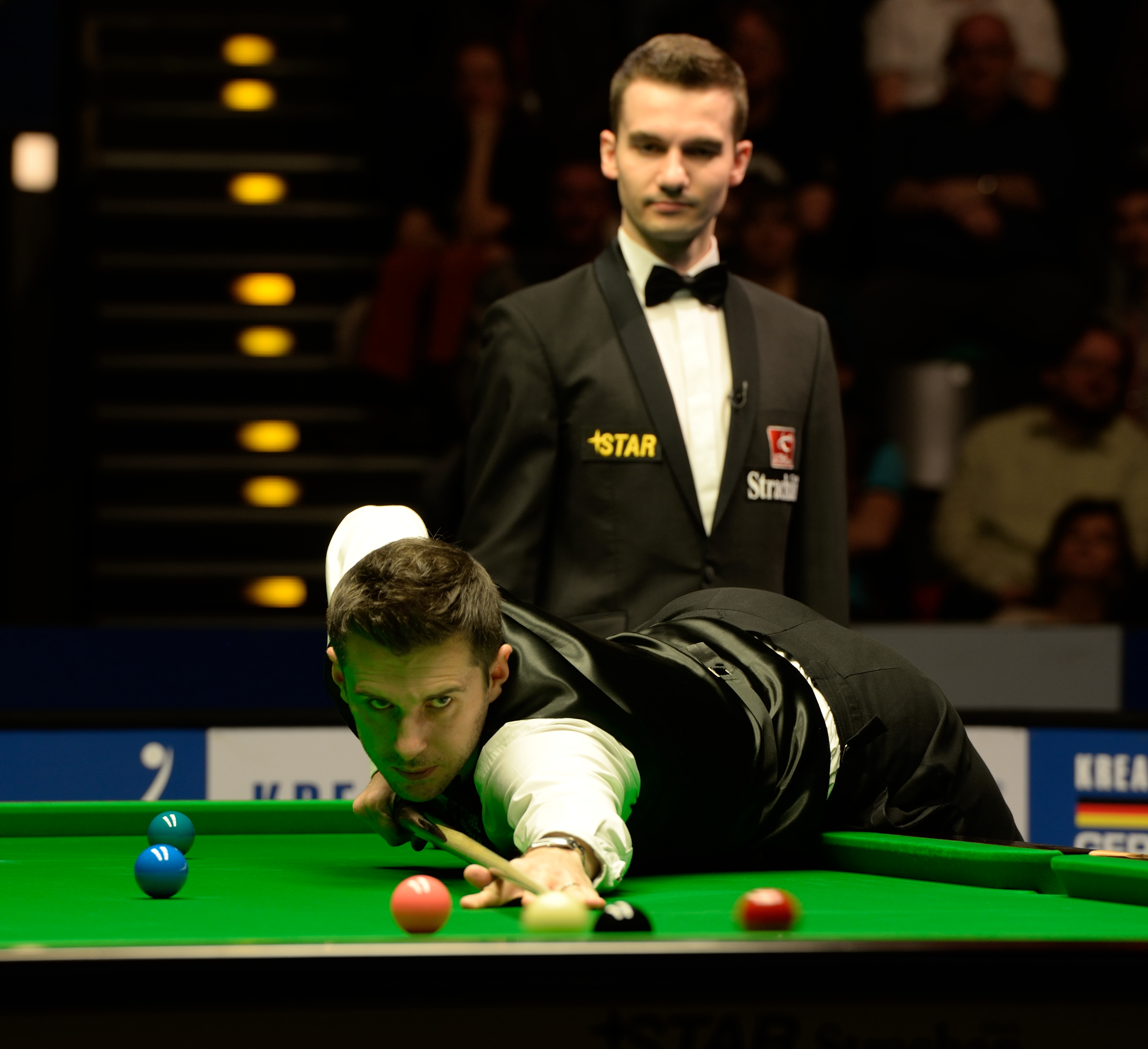
Mark Selby won the event, defeating Martin Gould 9–8 in the final

The final was played on 27 September as the best-of-17 frames held over two sessions and was refereed by Ben Williams. Selby was contesting for his 18th ranking title, whereas Gould had only won the 2016 German Masters previously. Selby won the opening frame of the match after fluking a snooker, forcing Gould to pocket the cue ball. Gould scored the first point in frame two, but Selby scored 274 unanswered points as he went 4–0 ahead at the interval. Selby made a break of 59 in frame five, but Gould made a clearance to win the frame by two points before winning the next frame. In frame seven, Gould made a break of 70 and a total clearance of 131 to tie the match at 4–4 after the first session.

On the resumption of the match, Gould won the ninth frame with a break of 94, before Selby won frame 10 to tie the match at 5–5. Gould then won frame 11 with a break of 65, before Selby tied the match again at 6–6 with a break of 113. Selby won frame 13 but the match was tied again at 7–7 after a break of 107 by Gould in the next frame. In frame 15 Gould required just the blue and pink balls to win, but hit the knuckle of the middle pocket. Selby then potted the remaining balls to win the frame and lead 8–7. Gould tied the match up and forced a deciding frame with a break of 96. The 17th frame was won by Selby who made a break of 72 to win the match. Following the tournament, Gould rose 17 places in the world rankings from 53 to 36th. This was the tenth final win in a row for Selby, who commented: "From being 4–0 down Martin played fantastically well to get back into the match and after that it was nip-and-tuck. It could have gone either way."

== Tournament draw ==
The results from the event are shown below. Players in bold denote match winners, whilst numbers in brackets display player seedings. Some matches involved a withdrawn player, denoted by "w/d" with players receiving a bye as "w/o".

=== Top half ===
==== Section 1 ====
Last 128; Best of 9 frames
**Neil Robertson (AUS) (1)**	**5**
Sunny Akani (THA)	3
**Riley Parsons (ENG)**	**5**
Soheil Vahedi (IRN)	4
Noppon Saengkham (THA) (32)	4
**Allan Taylor (ENG)**	**5**
Sam Craigie (ENG)	3
**Ben Woollaston (ENG)**	**5**
Joe Perry (ENG) (16)	4
**Robbie Williams (ENG)**	**5**
Ben Hancorn (ENG)	2
**Pang Junxu (CHN)**	**5**
**Barry Hawkins (ENG) (17)**	**5**
Fan Zhengyi (CHN)	1
Gerard Greene (NIR)	2
**Jordan Brown (NIR)**	**5**

Last 64; Best of 9 frames
**(Australia) Neil Robertson (1)**	**5**
(England) Riley Parsons	2
**(England) Allan Taylor**	**5**
(England) Ben Woollaston	3
(England) Robbie Williams	1
**(China) Pang Junxu**	**5**
**(England) Barry Hawkins (17)**	**5**
(Northern Ireland) Jordan Brown	1

Last 32; Best of 9 frames
**(Australia) Neil Robertson (1)**	**5**
(England) Allan Taylor	2
**(China) Pang Junxu**	**5**
(England) Barry Hawkins (17)	2

Last 16; Best of 9 frames
**(Australia) Neil Robertson (1)**	**5**
(China) Pang Junxu	2

==== Section 2 ====
Last 128; Best of 9 frames
**Antoni Kowalski (POL)**	**5**
Sean Maddocks (ENG)	3
**Tom Ford (ENG) (24)**	**5**
Mark King (ENG)	2
**James Cahill (ENG)**	**w/o**
Elliot Slessor (ENG)	w/d
**Stephen Maguire (SCO) (9)**	**5**
Chang Bingyu (CHN)	3
**Jak Jones (WAL)**	**5**
Jamie O'Neill (ENG)	2
**Zhou Yuelong (CHN) (25)**	**5**
Alexander Ursenbacher (SUI)	4
**Alan McManus (SCO)**	**5**
Rod Lawler (ENG)	3
**Shaun Murphy (ENG) (8)**	**5**
Liang Wenbo (CHN)	4

Last 64; Best of 9 frames
(Poland) Antoni Kowalski	4
**(England) Tom Ford (24)**	**5**
(England) James Cahill	3
**(Scotland) Stephen Maguire (9)**	**5**
(Wales) Jak Jones	2
**(China) Zhou Yuelong (25)**	**5**
(Scotland) Alan McManus	3
**(England) Shaun Murphy (8)**	**5**

Last 32; Best of 9 frames
**(England) Tom Ford (24)**	**5**
(Scotland) Stephen Maguire (9)	1
(China) Zhou Yuelong (25)	1
**(England) Shaun Murphy (8)**	**5**

Last 16; Best of 9 frames
(England) Tom Ford (24)	4
**(England) Shaun Murphy (8)**	**5**

==== Section 3 ====
Last 128; Best of 9 frames
**Mark Allen (NIR) (5)**	**5**
Florian Nüßle (AUT)	2
Farakh Ajaib (ENG)	0
**Ken Doherty (IRL)**	**5**
Jimmy Robertson (ENG) (28)	4
**Ashley Carty (ENG)**	**5**
Jamie Wilson (ENG)	1
**Simon Lichtenberg (GER)**	**5**
**Ding Junhui (CHN) (12)**	**5**
Yuan Sijun (CHN)	0
Brandon Sargeant (ENG)	0
**Hossein Vafaei (IRN)**	**5**
**Graeme Dott (SCO) (21)**	**5**
Xu Si (CHN)	0
**Lyu Haotian (CHN)**	**5**
Alex Borg (MLT)	4

Last 64; Best of 9 frames
**(Northern Ireland) Mark Allen (5)**	**5**
(Republic of Ireland) Ken Doherty	0
**(England) Ashley Carty**	**5**
(Germany) Simon Lichtenberg	1
**(China) Ding Junhui (12)**	**5**
(Iran) Hossein Vafaei	3
(Scotland) Graeme Dott (21)	2
**(China) Lyu Haotian**	**5**

Last 32; Best of 9 frames
**(Northern Ireland) Mark Allen (5)**	**5**
(England) Ashley Carty	2
**(China) Ding Junhui (12)**	**5**
(China) Lyu Haotian	4

Last 16; Best of 9 frames
(Northern Ireland) Mark Allen (5)	2
**(China) Ding Junhui (12)**	**5**

==== Section 4 ====
Last 128; Best of 9 frames
**Fraser Patrick (SCO)**	**5**
Tian Pengfei (CHN)	3
Thepchaiya Un-Nooh (THA) (20)	4
**Liam Highfield (ENG)**	**5**
**Chen Zifan (CHN)**	**5**
Eden Sharav (ISR)	3
**Stuart Bingham (ENG) (13)**	**5**
Louis Heathcote (ENG)	3
**Mark Davis (ENG)**	**5**
Amine Amiri (MAR)	1
Zhao Xintong (CHN) (29)	4
**Nigel Bond (ENG)**	**5**
**Gao Yang (CHN)**	**5**
Zhao Jianbo (CHN)	4
**Mark Selby (ENG) (4)**	**w/o**
Michael White (WAL)	w/d

Last 64; Best of 9 frames
(Scotland) Fraser Patrick	4
**(England) Liam Highfield**	**5**
(China) Chen Zifan	1
**(England) Stuart Bingham (13)**	**5**
**(England) Mark Davis**	**5**
(England) Nigel Bond	4
(China) Gao Yang	0
**(England) Mark Selby (4)**	**5**

Last 32; Best of 9 frames
(England) Liam Highfield	4
**(England) Stuart Bingham (13)**	**5**
(England) Mark Davis	w/d
(England) **Mark Selby (4)**	**w/o**

Last 16; Best of 9 frames
(England) Stuart Bingham (13)	4
**(England) Mark Selby (4)**	**5**

=== Bottom half ===
==== Section 5 ====
Last 128; Best of 9 frames
**Judd Trump (ENG) (3)**	**5**
Iulian Boiko (UKR)	0
**Lukas Kleckers (GER)**	**5**
Mark Joyce (ENG)	3
**Michael Holt (ENG) (30)**	**5**
Anthony Hamilton (ENG)	3
**Jamie Jones (WAL)**	**5**
Dominic Dale (WAL)	1
**Jack Lisowski (ENG) (14)**	**5**
Brian Ochoiski (FRA)	4
**Jackson Page (WAL)**	**5**
Billy Castle (ENG)	1
**Ali Carter (ENG) (19)**	**5**
Rory McLeod (JAM)	2
Steven Hallworth (ENG)	0
**Luca Brecel (BEL)**	**5**

Last 64; Best of 9 frames
**(England) Judd Trump (3)**	**5**
(Germany) Lukas Kleckers	1
**(England) Michael Holt (30)**	**5**
(Wales) Jamie Jones	2
(England) Jack Lisowski (14)	4
**(Wales) Jackson Page**	**5**
(England) Ali Carter (19)	1
**(Belgium) Luca Brecel**	**5**

Last 32; Best of 9 frames
**(England) Judd Trump (3)**	**5**
(England) Michael Holt (30)	1
**(Wales) Jackson Page**	**5**
(Belgium) Luca Brecel	3

Last 16; Best of 9 frames
**(England) Judd Trump (3)**	**5**
(Wales) Jackson Page	0

==== Section 6 ====
Last 128; Best of 9 frames
Kacper Filipiak (POL)	1
**Peter Lines (ENG)**	**5**
**Anthony McGill (SCO) (22)**	**5**
Luo Honghao (CHN)	3
**Robert Milkins (ENG)**	**5**
Ben Mertens (BEL)	0
**David Gilbert (ENG) (11)**	**w/o**
David Lilley (ENG)	w/d
**David Grace (ENG)**	**5**
Lu Ning (CHN)	2
Kurt Maflin (NOR) (27)	3
**Martin O'Donnell (ENG)**	**5**
Fergal O'Brien (IRL)	2
**Chris Wakelin (ENG)**	**5**
**Kyren Wilson (ENG) (6)**	**5**
Lee Walker (WAL)	1

Last 64; Best of 9 frames
(England) Peter Lines	2
**(Scotland) Anthony McGill (22)**	**5**
(England) Robert Milkins	3
**(England) David Gilbert (11)**	**5**
(England) David Grace	4
**(England) Martin O'Donnell**	**5**
(England) Chris Wakelin	0
**(England) Kyren Wilson (6)**	**5**

Last 32; Best of 9 frames
**(Scotland) Anthony McGill (22)**	**5**
(England) David Gilbert (11)	4
(England) Martin O'Donnell	2
**(England) Kyren Wilson (6)**	**5**

Last 16; Best of 9 frames
(Scotland) Anthony McGill (22)	2
**(England) Kyren Wilson (6)**	**5**

==== Section 7 ====
Last 128; Best of 9 frames
John Higgins (SCO) (7)	4
**Martin Gould (ENG)**	**5**
**Ian Burns (ENG)**	**5**
Jimmy White (ENG)	4
**Matthew Selt (ENG) (26)**	**5**
Li Hang (CHN)	3
**Jamie Clarke (WAL)**	**5**
Ricky Walden (ENG)	3
**Mark Williams (WAL) (10)**	**5**
Ashley Hugill (ENG)	0
Zak Surety (ENG)	3
**Peter Devlin (ENG)**	**5**
**Scott Donaldson (SCO) (23)**	**5**
Mitchell Mann (ENG)	2
Lei Peifan (CHN)	3
**Joe O'Connor (ENG)**	**5**

Last 64; Best of 9 frames
**(England) Martin Gould**	**5**
(England) Ian Burns	1
(England) Matthew Selt (26)	4
**(Wales) Jamie Clarke**	**5**
(Wales) Mark Williams (10)	4
**(England) Peter Devlin**	**5**
(Scotland) Scott Donaldson (23)	2
**(England) Joe O'Connor**	**5**

Last 32; Best of 9 frames
**(England) Martin Gould**	**5**
(Wales) Jamie Clarke	2
**(England) Peter Devlin**	**5**
(England) Joe O'Connor	4

Last 16; Best of 9 frames
**(England) Martin Gould**	**5**
(England) Peter Devlin	3

==== Section 8 ====
Last 128; Best of 9 frames
**Andrew Higginson (ENG)**	**5**
Oliver Lines (ENG)	2
Gary Wilson (ENG) (18)	w/d
**Duane Jones (WAL)**	**w/o**
Si Jiahui (CHN)	3
**Ryan Day (WAL)**	**5**
**Yan Bingtao (CHN) (15)**	**5**
Barry Pinches (ENG)	0
**Matthew Stevens (WAL)**	**5**
Igor Figueiredo (BRA)	1
**Xiao Guodong (CHN) (31)**	**5**
Stuart Carrington (ENG)	3
**Aaron Hill (IRL)**	**5**
Andy Hicks (ENG)	2
**Ronnie O'Sullivan (ENG) (2)**	**w/o**
Daniel Wells (WAL)	w/d

Last 64; Best of 9 frames
(England) Andrew Higginson	3
**(Wales) Duane Jones**	**5**
(Wales) Ryan Day	3
**(China) Yan Bingtao (15)**	**5**
**(Wales) Matthew Stevens**	**5**
(China) Xiao Guodong (31)	1
**(Republic of Ireland) Aaron Hill**	**5**
(England) Ronnie O'Sullivan (2)	4

Last 32; Best of 9 frames
(Wales) Duane Jones	1
**(China) Yan Bingtao (15)**	**5**
(Wales) Matthew Stevens	3
**(Republic of Ireland) Aaron Hill**	**5**

Last 16; Best of 9 frames
**(China) Yan Bingtao (15)**	**5**
(Republic of Ireland) Aaron Hill	1

=== Finals ===
**Quarter-finals**; Best of 9 frames
(Australia) Neil Robertson (1)	4
**(England) Shaun Murphy (8)**	**5**
(China) Ding Junhui (12)	1
**(England) Mark Selby (4)**	**5**
**(England) Judd Trump (3)**	**5**
(England) Kyren Wilson (6)	2
**(England) Martin Gould**	**5**
(China) Yan Bingtao (15)	4

**Semi-finals**; Best of 11 frames
(England) Shaun Murphy (8)	3
**(England) Mark Selby (4)**	**6**
(England) Judd Trump (3)	3
**(England) Martin Gould**	**6**

**Final**; Best of 17 frames
**(England) Mark Selby (4)**	**9**
(England) Martin Gould	8

=== Final ===
Final: Best of 17 frames. Referee: Ben Williams; Marshall Arena, Milton Keynes, England, 27 September 2020.
**Mark Selby** (4); England	**9**–8	Martin Gould; England
Afternoon: **90**–40, **130**–1 (130), **96**–0, **78**–1, 59–**61**, 1–**89**, 0–**74**, 0–**131** (131); Evening: 4–**100**, **79**–6, 25–**65**, **113**–10 (113), **84**–41, 1–**107** (107), **60**–48, 0–**96**, **80**–1
130	Highest break	**131**
2	Century breaks	2

== Century breaks ==
There was a total of 98 century breaks made during the tournament, the highest of which was a 145 made by Mark Allen in frame four of his second round win over Ken Doherty.

- 145, 141, 135, 134, 114, 104, 104, 101, 101 – Mark Allen
- 140, 121, 111 – David Gilbert
- 139 – Zhao Xintong
- 138, 136, 132, 125, 113, 112 – Stuart Bingham
- 138, 121, 101 – Mark Williams
- 137, 115, 110, 105, 102 – Shaun Murphy
- 135 – Fergal O'Brien
- 134 – Ken Doherty
- 133, 126, 115 – Yan Bingtao
- 132, 123, 105, 105, 100 – Judd Trump
- 132 – Ashley Carty
- 132 – Jimmy White
- 132 – Rory McLeod
- 132 – Sunny Akani
- 131, 130, 120 – Jamie Clarke
- 131, 107, 102 – Martin Gould
- 130, 129, 100 – Pang Junxu
- 130, 114, 113, 111 – Mark Selby
- 130 – Jackson Page
- 129, 129, 104 – Martin O'Donnell
- 129, 105, 100 – Anthony McGill
- 129, 102 – Allan Taylor
- 129 – James Cahill
- 125 – Jak Jones
- 120, 106, 100 – Kyren Wilson
- 117, 116 – Luo Honghao
- 117 – Chang Bingyu
- 117 – Graeme Dott
- 115 – Luca Brecel
- 113, 105, 102 – Barry Hawkins
- 113 – Ryan Day
- 111 – Joe Perry
- 109 – Anthony Hamilton
- 109 – Jamie Jones
- 109 – Li Hang
- 109 – Alexander Ursenbacher
- 108 – Mitchell Mann
- 107 – Ding Junhui
- 107 – Matthew Stevens
- 106, 101 – Lyu Haotian
- 104 – Andrew Higginson
- 103 – Simon Lichtenberg
- 102, 100, 100 – Neil Robertson
- 102 – Peter Devlin
- 102 – Jack Lisowski
- 102 – Florian Nüßle
- 102 – Ronnie O'Sullivan
- 100 – Aaron Hill
- 100 – Hossein Vafaei

== Coverage ==
The event was broadcast by Eurosport in Europe and Australia; Superstar Online, Liaoning TV, Youku, Zhibo.tv and Migu in China; Now TV in Hong Kong; True Sport in Thailand; Sports Cast in Taiwan and Sky Sports in New Zealand. In other territories without official broadcasters, the event was streamed online by Matchroom Sport. The tournament was sponsored by betting company BetVictor.
