= Zhou Yuelong =

Chinese snooker player (born 1998)

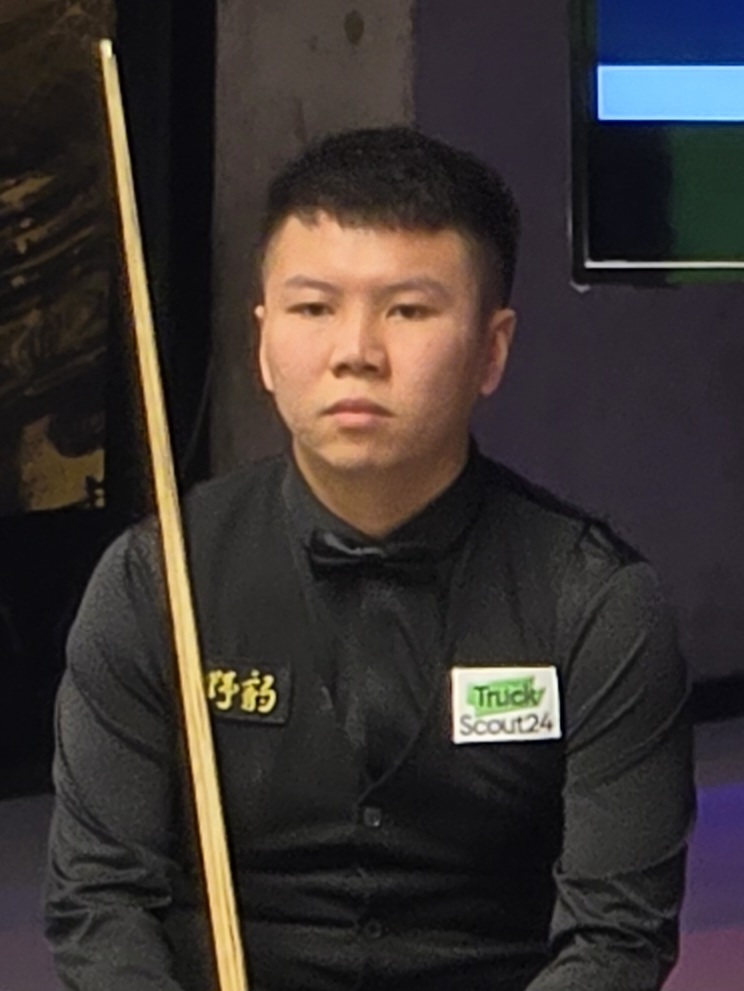
- Zhou at the 2025 German Masters

Personal information
- Nickname: The Jumping Dragon
- Born: 24 January 1998 (age 28) Chengdu, Sichuan, China

Sport
- Country: China
- Sport: Snooker
- Professional: 2014–present
- Highest ranking: 17 (February–March 2021)
- Current ranking: 19 (as of 26 October 2026)
- Maximum breaks: 3
- Century breaks: 274 (as of 4 November 2026)
- Best ranking finish: Runner-up (×4)
Medal record
Representing China
Men's Snooker
Asian Indoor and Martial Arts Games
Bronze medal – third place	2017 Ashgabat	Singles
Bronze medal – third place	2017 Ashgabat	Team

Zhou Yuelong
- Simplified Chinese: 周跃龙
- Traditional Chinese: 周躍龍
Transcriptions
Standard Mandarin
- Hanyu Pinyin: Zhōu Yuèlóng
Yue: Cantonese
- Yale Romanization: Jāu Yeuhk Lùhng
- Jyutping: Zau¹ Joek⁶ Lung⁴

Zhou Yuelong (Chinese: 周跃龙; born 24 January 1998) is a Chinese professional snooker player. He has been runner-up at four ranking events; the January 2020 European Masters, the 2020 Shoot Out, the 2022 Northern Ireland Open, and the 2025 English Open.

== Career ==
Between 2011 and 2014, Zhou was regularly selected to play in the wildcard round of Chinese ranking events. He could only win two of the nine he played in and was knocked out in the first round in both of those. Zhou won the 2013 IBSF World Snooker Championship which enabled him to join the snooker tour for the 2014–15 season.

=== 2014/2015 season ===
Zhou turned pro in 2014. His first win as a professional came at attempt number one as he defeated Alfie Burden 5–3 to qualify for the 2014 Wuxi Classic, where he lost 5–3 to Graeme Dott in the first round. Zhou defeated compatriot Liang Wenbo 6–2 to qualify for the International Championship and won his first ever match at a ranking event by eliminating Chris Melling 6–1, before being edged out 6–5 by Ricky Walden. He made his debut in a ranking event outside China at the UK Championship, but lost 6–1 to Jimmy Robertson in the first round. At the minor-ranking Xuzhou Open, Zhou saw off Barry Pinches to reach the quarter-finals where Thepchaiya Un-Nooh beat him 4–2. This helped him finish 15th on the Order of Merit. Zhou's second last 32 appearance at a ranking event this season came at the China Open and, after winning the first two frames, he lost 5–2 to David Gilbert. He was the world number 75 after his debut season on tour.

It’s unbelievable – fantastic. It’s a huge tournament for us. Our dreams were to become champions since we first picked up the cue – and now they have come true. It’s very unexpected. Our goal was to make the knock out stage because we were in a tough group. After the group stage we realised that we had a good chance if we could play our best, so the confidence just built match by match.

— Zhou after winning the Snooker World Cup.

Zhou was selected to take part in the non-ranking 2015 Snooker World Cup with 15-year old Yan Bingtao as part of China's "B" team; China were allowed a second team as the hosts. They were 50/1 outsiders but topped their group, knocking out England in the process, and then in the knock-out stages beat Australia, Wales and Scotland in the final and pocketed a cheque of US$200,000 between them. Defeated finalist Stephen Maguire stated that he believed he had watched two future world champions.

=== 2015/2016 season ===
Zhou saw off Sam Baird 6–4 to qualify for the 2015 International Championship and beat Martin Gould 6–2 and Sanderson Lam 6–0 to reach the last 16 of a ranking event for the first time, where he lost 6–5 to Thepchaiya Un-Nooh. His World Cup win gained him entry into the Champion of Champions and he edged out reigning world champion Stuart Bingham 4–3, before losing 6–3 to Kyren Wilson in the quarter-finals. In the UK Championship Zhou defeated Craig Steadman 6–3, before exiting 6–1 in the second round to Shaun Murphy. He qualified for the China Open and lost 5–2 to John Higgins in the opening round. Zhou almost played in the World Championship for the first time, but was defeated in the final qualifying round 10–7 by compatriot Zhang Anda. He entered the top 64 in the world rankings for the first time at the end of the season, as he was 54th.

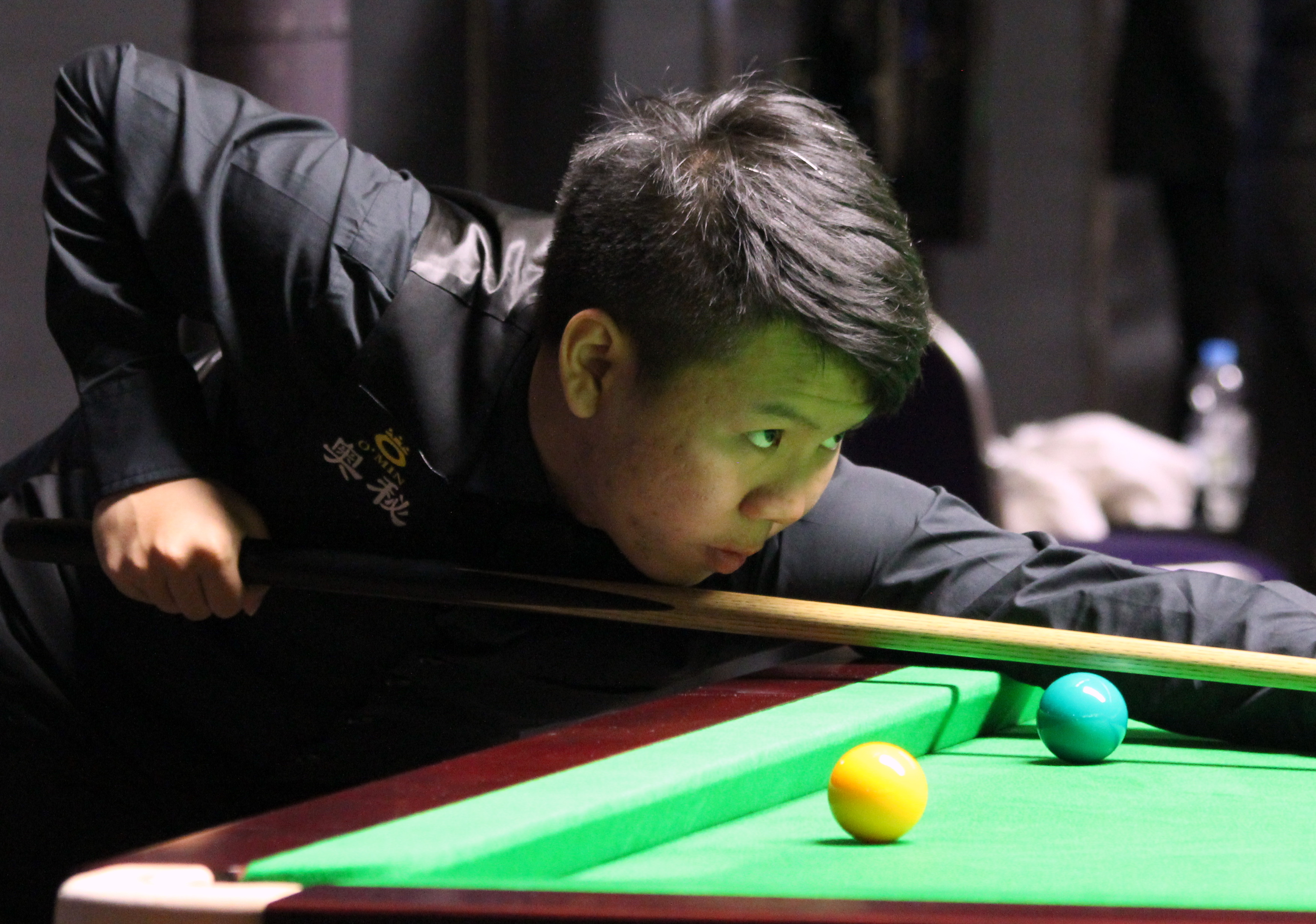
2016 Paul Hunter Classic

=== 2016/2017 season ===
Zhou got to the last 16 of the 2016 International Championship with wins over Anthony McGill and Mark Joyce, but lost 6–2 to John Higgins. He progressed through to the same stage of the UK Championship by defeating his World Cup partner Yan Bingtao 6–5 and was beaten 6–2 by Shaun Murphy. Zhou dropped just two frames in four matches at the Welsh Open to reach his first ranking event quarter-final, but was whitewashed 5–0 by Scott Donaldson. He beat Christopher Keogan 10–5, Ian Preece 10–8 and Ben Woollaston 10–9 to qualify for his first World Championship and said he hoped to draw Ronnie O'Sullivan in the opening round. Instead he faced Ding Junhui and was defeated 10–5. Zhou broke in to the top 32 in the world rankings for the first time at the end of the season.

=== 2017/2018 season ===
Zhou reached the semi-finals of a ranking event for the first time at the European Masters. He defeated Robbie Williams, Oliver Lines, Michael Georgiou, Peter Lines, and Anthony McGill, before losing 6–4 to Stuart Bingham. He has also reached the final of the Championship League (it was a non-ranking event), but lost 3–2 to John Higgins.

=== 2018/2019 season ===
In his match against Lyu Haotian at the Indian Open, Zhou made his first official maximum break in the fourth frame, but eventually lost the match 3–4. Zhou also qualified for the World Snooker Championship again after beating Robin Hull, Liam Highfield, and Eden Sharav in the qualifying rounds. He recorded his first win in the tournament by defeating Mark Allen 10–7, but lost to Ali Carter 13–9 in the second round.

=== 2019/2020 season ===
In January 2020, Zhou reached his maiden ranking final at the European Masters after wins over Mark Williams and Barry Hawkins, and Gary Wilson. The semi-final against Wilson started at 8pm and finished after midnight in a deciding frame. The following day Zhou was beaten by Neil Robertson 9–0 in the final, becoming the second player ever to be whitewashed in a two-session ranking event final. Zhou reached another ranking final in February, but lost to Michael Holt at the Shoot Out.

With the outbreak of COVID-19, Zhou returned to his home in west China. Facing a multitude of travelling and quarantine complications, he did not return for the resumption of the season, and missed the World Championship. He finished the season ranked 25.

=== 2020/2021 season ===
Zhou had a stellar performance in the UK Championship, reaching his first Triple Crown semi-final. After his win over John Higgins in the last 16, Higgins tipped him to become the next Chinese player to make a major breakthrough in snooker. Zhou made his second maximum break of his career at the Scottish Open in his win over Peter Lines.

At the World Championship Zhou, ranked 17, was the top seed in the qualification rounds. He beat Xu Si 6–5, after producing a remarkable clearance to level the scores 5-5. However, in the final qualifying round he lost to Liam Highfield 10–7. Zhou finished the season ranked 17.

=== 2021/2022 season ===
Zhou reached the quarter-finals of the second ranking tournament of the season, the British Open, losing in the deciding frame to Elliot Slessor. However, the rest of his season was comparatively unsuccessful. He missed three ranking events early in the season, and only reached the last 16 twice, in the German Masters and the Turkish Masters, losing to Judd Trump on both occasions. After Ding Junhui's fall from the top 16 at the UK Championship, Zhou was expected to make his Masters debut in January, but was pipped by compatriot Zhao Xintong. Zhou lost in the final qualifying round of the World Championship for the second year in a row to finish the season ranked 23, a drop of six places.

== Performance and rankings timeline ==
Tournament	2011/ 12	2012/ 13	2013/ 14	2014/ 15	2015/ 16	2016/ 17	2017/ 18	2018/ 19	2019/ 20	2020/ 21	2021/ 22	2022/ 23	2023/ 24	2024/ 25	2025/ 26	2026/ 27
Ranking (Note: It shows the ranking at the beginning of the season)	(Note: He was an amateur)			(Note: New players on the Main Tour don't have a ranking)	75	54	31	33	31	25	17	23	25	23	32	23
Ranking tournaments
Championship League	Non-Ranking Event									3R	WD	RR	2R	RR	RR	2R
China Open	WR	WR	A	2R	1R	2R	3R	1R	Tournament Not Held							SF
Wuhan Open	Tournament Not Held												2R	LQ	2R	LQ
British Open	Tournament Not Held										QF	1R	LQ	1R	LQ	LQ
English Open	Tournament Not Held					2R	WD	4R	3R	QF	WD	LQ	QF	1R	F	QF
Shenzhen Open (Note: The event was called the Xi'an Grand Prix (2024/2025–2025/2026))	Tournament Not Held													1R	2R	LQ
Northern Ireland Open	Tournament Not Held					3R	2R	4R	2R	2R	LQ	F	LQ	2R	SF	1R
International Championship	NH	1R	WR	2R	3R	3R	LQ	2R	1R	Not Held			2R	LQ	1R	1R
UK Championship	A	A	A	1R	2R	4R	1R	3R	1R	SF	3R	2R	QF	LQ	2R	
Shoot Out	Non-Ranking Event					1R	1R	1R	F	4R	1R	4R	3R	3R	3R	
Scottish Open	NH	MR	Not Held			1R	3R	3R	1R	3R	WD	3R	SF	2R	QF	
German Masters	A	A	A	LQ	LQ	LQ	LQ	1R	LQ	1R	2R	LQ	2R	2R	1R	
Welsh Open	A	A	A	1R	1R	QF	1R	2R	1R	4R	LQ	LQ	LQ	1R	QF	
World Grand Prix	Not Held			NR	DNQ	1R	DNQ	DNQ	1R	1R	DNQ	2R	2R	DNQ	SF	
Players Championship (Note: The event was called the Players Tour Championship Grand Final (2011/2012–2015/2016))	DNQ	DNQ	DNQ	DNQ	DNQ	DNQ	DNQ	DNQ	DNQ	1R	DNQ	1R	1R	DNQ	1R	
World Open	WR	A	A	Not Held		2R	A	1R	QF	Not Held			1R	3R	3R	
Tour Championship	Tournament Not Held							DNQ	DNQ	DNQ	DNQ	DNQ	DNQ	DNQ	DNQ	
World Championship	A	A	A	LQ	LQ	1R	LQ	2R	A	LQ	LQ	LQ	LQ	1R	1R	
Non-ranking tournaments
Shanghai Masters	Ranking Event							2R	A	Not Held			1R	QF	A	2R
Champion of Champions	Not Held		A	A	QF	A	A	A	A	A	A	A	A	A	A	
Championship League	A	A	A	A	A	A	F	A	A	2R	RR	RR	WD	RR	WD	
Former ranking tournaments
Wuxi Classic	NR	1R	WR	1R	Tournament Not Held											
Australian Goldfields Open	A	A	A	LQ	LQ	Tournament Not Held										
Shanghai Masters	A	WR	WR	LQ	LQ	LQ	2R	Non-Ranking		Not Held			Non-Ranking Event			
Paul Hunter Classic	Minor-Ranking Event					1R	A	1R	NR	Tournament Not Held						
Indian Open	Not Held		A	1R	NH	1R	1R	1R	Tournament Not Held							
Riga Masters (Note: The event was called the Riga Open (2014/2015–2015/2016))	Not Held			Minor-Rank		2R	1R	1R	2R	Tournament Not Held						
China Championship	Tournament Not Held					NR	QF	LQ	2R	Tournament Not Held						
WST Pro Series	Tournament Not Held									2R	Tournament Not Held					
Turkish Masters	Tournament Not Held										3R	Tournament Not Held				
Gibraltar Open	Tournament Not Held				MR	3R	1R	QF	2R	2R	3R	Tournament Not Held				
WST Classic	Tournament Not Held											3R	Tournament Not Held			
European Masters	Tournament Not Held					LQ	SF	2R	F	3R	2R	3R	2R	Not Held		
Saudi Arabia Masters	Tournament Not Held													4R	4R	NH
Former non-ranking tournaments
Macau Masters	Tournament Not Held							RR	Tournament Not Held							
Six-red World Championship	NH	A	A	A	A	A	A	2R	A	Not Held		RR	Tournament Not Held			
Haining Open	Not Held			Minor-Rank		1R	A	A	4R	NH	A	A	Tournament Not Held			

Performance Table Legend
LQ	lost in the qualifying draw	#R	lost in the early rounds of the tournament (WR = Wildcard round, RR = Round robin)	QF	lost in the quarter-finals
SF	lost in the semi-finals	F	lost in the final	W	won the tournament
DNQ	did not qualify for the tournament	A	did not participate in the tournament	WD	withdrew from the tournament

NH / Not Held	means an event was not held.
NR / Non-Ranking Event	means an event is/was no longer a ranking event.
R / Ranking Event	means an event is/was a ranking event.
MR / Minor-Ranking Event	means an event is/was a minor-ranking event.

== Career finals ==
=== Ranking finals: 4 ===
Outcome	No.	Year	Championship	Opponent in the final	Score
Runner-up	1.	2020	European Masters	(Australia) Neil Robertson	0–9
Runner-up	2.	2020	Snooker Shoot Out	(England) Michael Holt	0–1
Runner-up	3.	2022	Northern Ireland Open	(Northern Ireland) Mark Allen	4–9
Runner-up	4.	2025	English Open	(Northern Ireland) Mark Allen	8–9

=== Non-ranking finals: 1 ===
Outcome	No.	Year	Championship	Opponent in the final	Score
Runner-up	1.	2018	Championship League	(Scotland) John Higgins	2–3

=== Pro-am finals: 2 (1 title) ===
Outcome	No.	Year	Championship	Opponent in the final	Score
Runner-up	1.	2016	Fuzhou Open	(China) Zhang Anda	1–5
Winner	1.	2018	Zibo International Open	(China) Yan Bingtao	5–2

=== Team finals: 4 (2 titles) ===
Outcome	No.	Year	Championship	Team	Opponent in the final	Score
Winner	1.	2015	World Cup	China B Yan Bingtao	Scotland; John Higgins; Stephen Maguire	4–1
Runner-up	1.	2017	CVB Snooker Challenge	China Ding Junhui; Liang Wenbo; Yan Bingtao; Zhao Xintong	Great Britain (England) Ronnie O'Sullivan (Wales) Mark Williams (Scotland) Graeme Dott (England) Joe Perry (England) Michael Holt	9–26
Winner	2.	2018	Macau Masters	(England) Barry Hawkins (Wales) Ryan Day (China) Zhao Xintong	(Wales) Mark Williams (England) Joe Perry (Hong Kong) Marco Fu (China) Zhang Anda	5–1
Runner-up	2.	2019	World Cup	China B Liang Wenbo	Scotland; John Higgins; Stephen Maguire	0–4

=== Amateur finals: 2 (1 title) ===
Outcome	No.	Year	Championship	Opponent in the final	Score
Runner-up	1.	2013	IBSF World Under-21 Championship	(China) Lu Ning	4–9
Winner	1.	2013	IBSF World Championship	(China) Zhao Xintong	8–4
