= 2020 European Masters (2019–20 season) =

Snooker tournament held in January 2020

Tournament information
- Dates: 22–26 January 2020
- Venue: Messe Dornbirn
- City: Dornbirn
- Country: Austria
- Organisation: World Snooker Tour
- Format: Ranking event
- Total prize fund: £407,000
- Winner's share: £80,000
- Highest break: Thepchaiya Un-Nooh (THA) (146)

Final
- Champion: Neil Robertson (AUS)
- Runner-up: Zhou Yuelong (CHN)
- Score: 9–0

The 2020 European Masters was a professional ranking snooker tournament that took place from 22 to 26 January 2020 in Dornbirn, Austria. Organised by the World Professional Billiards and Snooker Association (WPBSA), it was the ninth ranking event of the 2019–20 season, following the 2019 UK Championship, and preceding the 2020 German Masters. It was the twenty-first edition of the European Masters first held in 1989. The event was sponsored by betting company BetVictor.

Qualifying took place from 17 to 19 December 2019 in Barnsley, England. Jimmy Robertson was the defending champion after defeating Joe Perry 9–6 in the 2018 final, but he lost 3–5 to Martin O'Donnell in the first qualifying round. Neil Robertson won the seventeenth ranking title of his career with a 9–0 whitewash win over Zhou Yuelong in the final. It was only the second whitewash in a two-session ranking event final, the first since the 1989 Grand Prix. A total of 27 century breaks were made during the tournament, with Thailand's Thepchaiya Un-Nooh making the highest, a 146 in the first round.

== Tournament format ==
The January 2020 European Masters was a professional snooker tournament held at the Messe Dornbirn in Dornbirn, Austria, between 22 and 26 January 2020. This was the twenty-first edition of the European Masters tournament, the first having been held in 1989 as the 1989 European Open. It was the ninth ranking event of the 2019–20 snooker season following the 2019 UK Championship and preceding the 2020 German Masters. It was played as the best-of-nine frames until the semi-finals, which were best-of-eleven frames, followed by a best-of-seventeen frames final. The event featured thirty-two participants from the World Snooker Tour with two qualifying rounds which took place from 17 to 19 December 2019 in Barnsley, England. The World Professional Billiards and Snooker Association and World Snooker organised the European Masters, and it was the first snooker ranking event to be held in Austria.

=== Prize fund ===
The event featured a total prize fund of £407,000 with the winner receiving £80,000. The event was the first of the "European Series", all sponsored by betting company BetVictor also including the German Masters, Snooker Shoot Out and Gibraltar Open. The player who accumulates the highest amount of prize money over the four events receives a bonus of £150,000. The breakdown of prize money for the event is shown below:

- Winner: £80,000
- Runner-up: £35,000
- Semi-final: £17,500
- Quarter-final: £11,000
- Last 16: £6,000
- Last 32: £4,000
- Last 64: £3,000
- Highest break: £5,000
- Total: £407,000

== Summary ==
=== Qualifying ===
The tournament began with a two-round qualification process held in the Barnsley Metrodome, Barnsley, England between 17 and 19 December 2019. All matches were held as the best-of-nine frames. The defending champion was Jimmy Robertson, who won his first ranking event in the 2018 final, where he defeated Joe Perry in the final 9–6. Both Robertson and Perry, however, lost in the opening qualifying round for the 2020 event to Martin O'Donnell and Tian Pengfei respectively. Reigning world champion Judd Trump was also defeated in the first round of qualifying, losing 3–5 to Ian Burns. Neil Robertson arrived late for his qualifying match against Nigel Bond but still won 5–2. World number thirteen David Gilbert lost 2–5 to Jordan Brown. The second qualifying round also featured top ranked players failing to progress. World number seven Mark Allen was whitewashed by Lu Ning 0–5. World number ten Shaun Murphy was also beaten 2–5 by Alfie Burden and world number fourteen Jack Lisowski was defeated on a deciding frame by Jackson Page.

=== Knockout stages ===
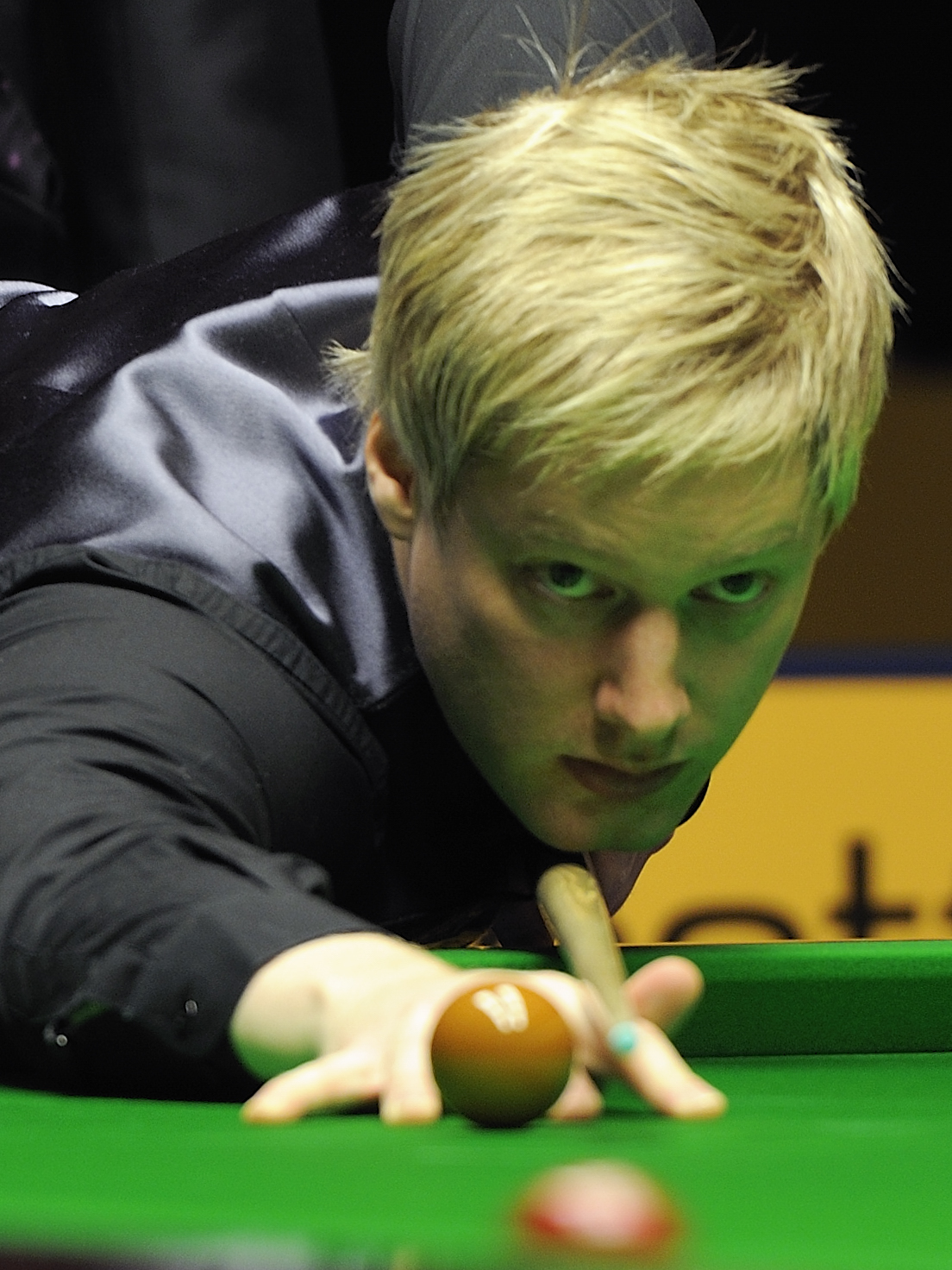
Neil Robertson won the event, completing a 9–0 victory over Zhou Yuelong

The main stages of the competition were played from 22 to 26 January 2020. All matches until the semi-finals were played as best-of-nine frames, with no intervals. The first round saw Riga Masters champion Yan Bingtao withdraw from the competition because of back pain. Thepchaiya Un-Nooh defeated Robbie Williams in his first round match, making the tournament's highest break of 146 in the sixth frame. World number three Mark Williams lost on a deciding frame to Zhou Yeulong 4–5. The second round featured four-time world champion John Higgins being defeated 5–4 by Un-Nooh. Higgins commented, "It's a tough one to take. I should have won 5–2", having been 4–2 ahead. Barry Hawkins defeated former world champion Mark Selby 5–4, in a match that contained nine breaks of over fifty. The UK Championship winner Ding Junhui lost 5–2 to Scott Donaldson.

The quarter-finals saw 2020 Masters finalist Ali Carter defeat Donaldson 5–1, Hawkins lose to Zhou Yuelong 2–5, Gary Wilson defeat Marco Fu 5–3 and Neil Robertson defeat Un-Nooh 5–1, with Robertson scoring three century breaks. The first semi-final was played between Carter and Robertson. Robertson won the opening frame then Carter leveled the score at 1–1. Robertson won the next five frames to win 6–1. After the match, Robertson commented that "[Carter's] mindset didn't seem to be there from the outset, maybe it was a hangover from the Masters". The second semi-final was held between Zhou and Wilson. Wilson led early in the match, but there was never more than two frames between the players. In a decider, Zhou won the frame to reach his first ranking event final, 6–5.

The final was played on 26 January 2020 between Robertson and Zhou, as a best-of-17 frames match over two sessions. The match was the first ranking event final for Zhou, and the first time since the 2017 Scottish Open it was contested by two players not from the United Kingdom. In the first session, Robertson won all eight frames, scoring a century break in both the fourth and eighth frames. When the match resumed, Zhou went in-off on the final red ball, allowing Robertson to win frame nine and complete a 9–0 victory. The win was only the second whitewash in a two-session ranking event final, the first since Steve Davis beat Dean Reynolds 10–0 in the 1989 Grand Prix final. By winning this event, Robertson had won one every season since 2006.

== Main draw ==
Below is the draw from the main stage (last 32) onwards. Seeded players have their seedings in brackets. Players highlighted in bold denote match winners.

**Last 32**; Best of 9 frames
Daniel Wells (WAL)	0
**Michael Holt (ENG)**	**5**
Tian Pengfei (CHN)	3
**Ali Carter (ENG) (17)**	**5**
Robert Milkins (ENG)	0
**Ding Junhui (CHN) (9)**	**5**
**Scott Donaldson (SCO) (25)**	**5**
Kyren Wilson (ENG) (8)	2
**John Higgins (SCO) (5)**	**5**
Fergal O'Brien (IRL)	2
Robbie Williams (ENG)	2
**Thepchaiya Un-Nooh (THA) (21)**	**5**
**Graeme Dott (SCO) (20)**	**5**
Liang Wenbo (CHN)	3
Lyu Haotian (CHN) (29)	2
**Neil Robertson (AUS) (4)**	**5**
Mark Williams (WAL) (3)	4
**Zhou Yuelong (CHN) (30)**	**5**
**Jackson Page (WAL)**	**w/o**
Yan Bingtao (CHN) (19)	w/d
David Lilley (ENG)	2
**Barry Hawkins (ENG) (11)**	**5**
Jak Jones (WAL)	2
**Mark Selby (ENG) (6)**	**5**
Lu Ning (CHN)	3
**Marco Fu (HKG)**	**5**
Alfie Burden (ENG)	3
**Xiao Guodong (CHN) (23)**	**5**
**Gary Wilson (ENG) (18)**	**5**
Luca Brecel (BEL)	1
Michael White (WAL)	2
**Zhao Xintong (CHN)**	**5**

**Last 16**; Best of 9 frames
(England) Michael Holt	4
**(England) Ali Carter (17)**	**5**
(China) Ding Junhui (9)	2
**(Scotland) Scott Donaldson (25)**	**5**
(Scotland) John Higgins (5)	4
**(Thailand) Thepchaiya Un-Nooh (21)**	**5**
(Scotland) Graeme Dott (20)	2
**(Australia) Neil Robertson (4)**	**5**
**(China) Zhou Yuelong (30)**	**5**
(Wales) Jackson Page	3
**(England) Barry Hawkins (11)**	**5**
(England) Mark Selby (6)	4
**(Hong Kong) Marco Fu**	**5**
(China) Xiao Guodong (23)	2
**(England) Gary Wilson (18)**	**5**
(China) Zhao Xintong	1

**Quarter-finals**; Best of 9 frames
**(England) Ali Carter (17)**	**5**
(Scotland) Scott Donaldson (25)	1
(Thailand) Thepchaiya Un-Nooh (21)	1
**(Australia) Neil Robertson (4)**	**5**
**(China) Zhou Yuelong (30)**	**5**
(England) Barry Hawkins (11)	2
(Hong Kong) Marco Fu	3
**(England) Gary Wilson (18)**	**5**

**Semi-finals**; Best of 11 frames
(England) Ali Carter (17)	1
**(Australia) Neil Robertson (4)**	**6**
**(China) Zhou Yuelong (30)**	**6**
(England) Gary Wilson (18)	5

**Final**; Best of 17 frames
**(Australia) Neil Robertson (4)**	**9**
(China) Zhou Yuelong (30)	0

=== Final ===
Final: Best of 17 frames. Referee: Maike Kesseler. Messe Dornbirn, Dornbirn, Austria, 26 January 2020.
**Neil Robertson** (4); Australia	**9**–0	Zhou Yuelong (30); China
Afternoon: **56**–47, **100**–44, **99**–0, **128**–0 (128), **83**–0, **65**–27, **71**–0, **109**–4 (109); Evening: **73**–45
**128**	Highest break	47
**2**	Century breaks	0

== Qualifying ==
Two rounds of qualifying matches were held between 17 and 19 December 2019 at the Barnsley Metrodome in Barnsley, England. All matches were the best-of-nine frames.

=== Round 1 ===
Jimmy Robertson (ENG) (1)	3–5	Martin O'Donnell (ENG)
Daniel Wells (WAL)	5–3	Billy Joe Castle (ENG)
Anthony McGill (SCO) (32)	4–5	Mitchell Mann (ENG)
Michael Holt (ENG)	5–1	Sunny Akani (THA)
Joe Perry (ENG) (16)	4–5	Tian Pengfei (CHN)
Chang Bingyu (CHN)	4–5	James Cahill (ENG)
Ali Carter (ENG) (17)	5–3	Zhang Jiankang (CHN)
Dominic Dale (WAL)	5–4	Peter Lines (ENG)
Elliot Slessor (ENG)	2–5	Robert Milkins (ENG)
Tom Ford (ENG) (24)	5–3	Andrew Higginson (ENG)
Peter Ebdon (ENG)	5–4	Zhang Anda (CHN)
Ding Junhui (CHN) (9)	5–1	Alexander Ursenbacher (SUI)
Mei Xiwen (CHN)	5–3	Alan McManus (SCO)
Scott Donaldson (SCO) (25)	5–1	Riley Parsons (ENG)
Chen Zifan (CHN)	5–2	Louis Heathcote (ENG)
Kyren Wilson (ENG) (8)	5–4	Si Jiahui (CHN)
John Higgins (SCO) (5)	5–2	Lei Peifan (CHN)
Soheil Vahedi (IRN)	2–5	Yuan Sijun (CHN)
Mark Davis (ENG) (28)	3–5	Fraser Patrick (SCO)
Liam Highfield (ENG)	4–5	Fergal O'Brien (IRL)
David Gilbert (ENG) (12)	2–5	Jordan Brown (NIR)
Robbie Williams (ENG)	5–3	Matthew Stevens (WAL)
Thepchaiya Un-Nooh (THA) (21)	5–3	Chen Feilong (CHN)
Luo Honghao (CHN)	5–4	Anthony Hamilton (ENG)
Ross Muir (SCO) (WC)	2–5	Kurt Maflin (NOR)
Graeme Dott (SCO) (20)	5–1	Thor Chuan Leong (MYS)
Liang Wenbo (CHN)	5–1	Chris Wakelin (ENG)
Stuart Bingham (ENG) (13)	5–1	Duane Jones (WAL)
Adam Stefanow (POL)	1–5	Li Hang (CHN)
Lyu Haotian (CHN) (29)	5–3	Igor Figueiredo (BRA)
Gerard Greene (NIR)	5–4	Brandon Sargeant (ENG)
Neil Robertson (AUS) (4)	5–2	Nigel Bond (ENG)

Mark Williams (WAL) (3)	5–4	Craig Steadman (ENG)
Eden Sharav (ISR)	5–4	John Astley (ENG)
Zhou Yuelong (CHN) (30)	5–4	Bai Langning (CHN)
David Grace (ENG)	5–2	Alex Borg (MLT)
Jack Lisowski (ENG) (14)	5–4	Hossein Vafaei (IRN)
Jamie O'Neill (ENG)	4–5	Jackson Page (WAL)
Yan Bingtao (CHN) (19)	5–2	Sam Baird (ENG)
Jamie Clarke (WAL)	4–5	Andy Hicks (ENG)
David Lilley (ENG)	5–4	Simon Lichtenberg (GER)
Ryan Day (WAL) (22)	5–1	Paul Davison (ENG)
Joe O'Connor (ENG)	3–5	Lee Walker (WAL)
Barry Hawkins (ENG) (11)	5–4	Ross Bulman (IRL) (WC)
Florian Nüßle (AUT) (WC)	4–5	Jak Jones (WAL)
Matthew Selt (ENG) (27)	5–0	Mike Dunn (ENG)
Jimmy White (ENG)	5–4	Hammad Miah (ENG)
Mark Selby (ENG) (6)	5–4	Ken Doherty (IRL)
Mark Allen (NIR) (7)	5–2	Mark King (ENG)
Lu Ning (CHN)	5–3	Oliver Lines (ENG)
Ricky Walden (ENG) (26)	3–5	Marco Fu (HKG)
Fan Zhengyi (CHN)	2–5	Ben Woollaston (ENG)
Shaun Murphy (ENG) (10)	5–2	Ashley Carty (ENG)
Kishan Hirani (WAL)	0–5	Alfie Burden (ENG)
Xiao Guodong (CHN) (23)	5–3	Andy Lee (HKG)
Xu Si (CHN)	1–5	Lukas Kleckers (GER) (WC)
Kacper Filipiak (POL)	5–3	Mark Joyce (ENG)
Gary Wilson (ENG) (18)	5–3	Barry Pinches (ENG)
Luca Brecel (BEL)	5–4	Michael Georgiou (CYP)
Stephen Maguire (SCO) (15)	3–5	Martin Gould (ENG)
Michael White (WAL)	5–0	Harvey Chandler (ENG)
Noppon Saengkham (THA) (31)	3–5	Rod Lawler (ENG)
Zhao Xintong (CHN)	5–0	Sam Craigie (ENG)
Judd Trump (ENG) (2)	3–5	Ian Burns (ENG)

=== Round 2 ===
(England) Martin O'Donnell	3–5	(Wales) Daniel Wells
(England) Mitchell Mann	3–5	(England) Michael Holt
(China) Tian Pengfei	5–0	(England) James Cahill
(England) Ali Carter (17)	5–2	(Wales) Dominic Dale
(England) Robert Milkins	5–2	(England) Tom Ford (24)
(England) Peter Ebdon	3–5	(China) Ding Junhui (9)
(China) Mei Xiwen	4–5	(Scotland) Scott Donaldson (25)
(China) Chen Zifan	1–5	(England) Kyren Wilson (8)
(Scotland) John Higgins (5)	5–2	(China) Yuan Sijun
(Scotland) Fraser Patrick	3–5	(Republic of Ireland) Fergal O'Brien
(Northern Ireland) Jordan Brown	1–5	(England) Robbie Williams
(Thailand) Thepchaiya Un-Nooh (21)	5–4	(China) Luo Honghao
(Norway) Kurt Maflin	0–5	(Scotland) Graeme Dott (20)
(China) Liang Wenbo	5–4	(England) Stuart Bingham (13)
(China) Li Hang	4–5	(China) Lyu Haotian (29)
(Northern Ireland) Gerard Greene	3–5	(Australia) Neil Robertson (4)

(Wales) Mark Williams (3)	5–0	(Israel) Eden Sharav
(China) Zhou Yuelong (30)	5–2	(England) David Grace
(England) Jack Lisowski (14)	4–5	(Wales) Jackson Page
(China) Yan Bingtao (19)	5–1	(England) Andy Hicks
(England) David Lilley	5–0	(Wales) Ryan Day (22)
(Wales) Lee Walker	1–5	(England) Barry Hawkins (11)
(Wales) Jak Jones	5–2	(England) Matthew Selt (27)
(England) Jimmy White	2–5	(England) Mark Selby (6)
(Northern Ireland) Mark Allen (7)	0–5	(China) Lu Ning
(Hong Kong) Marco Fu	5–0	(England) Ben Woollaston
(England) Shaun Murphy (10)	2–5	(England) Alfie Burden
(China) Xiao Guodong (23)	5–2	(Germany) Lukas Kleckers (WC)
(Poland) Kacper Filipiak	1–5	(England) Gary Wilson (18)
(Belgium) Luca Brecel	5–2	(England) Martin Gould
(Wales) Michael White	5–1	(England) Rod Lawler
(China) Zhao Xintong	5–2	(England) Ian Burns

== Century breaks ==
=== Main stage centuries ===
A total of 27 century breaks were made during the competition. The highest was a 146 made by Thepchaiya Un-Nooh in frame six of his first round match against Robbie Williams.

- 146, 124 – Thepchaiya Un-Nooh
- 136 – Mark Selby
- 131 – Ding Junhui
- 130 – Michael Holt
- 128, 115, 110, 109, 107, 104, 100 – Neil Robertson
- 121 – Xiao Guodong
- 113, 113, 100 – Zhou Yuelong
- 109 – Scott Donaldson
- 106, 105, 105, 104, 102 – Gary Wilson
- 104 – Graeme Dott
- 102, 100 – Barry Hawkins
- 102 – Liang Wenbo
- 102 – Marco Fu

=== Qualifying stage centuries ===
A total of 67 century breaks were made during the qualifying stages of the event. The highest of these was a 142 made by Michael Georgiou, made in frame four of his first round match against Luca Brecel.

- 142 – Michael Georgiou
- 140 – Jordan Brown
- 137, 116, 105, 102, 102 – Yan Bingtao
- 135, 108, 105 – Scott Donaldson
- 135 – Barry Hawkins
- 135 – David Grace
- 134, 132, 121, 102 – Liang Wenbo
- 134 – Alfie Burden
- 134 – Chang Bingyu
- 131, 129 – Luo Honghao
- 130, 116 – Zhou Yuelong
- 128, 100 – Lyu Haotian
- 127, 126, 105 – Jak Jones
- 125 – Martin Gould
- 124, 113 – Luca Brecel
- 123, 100 – Jack Lisowski
- 120, 112 – Xiao Guodong
- 120 – Mitchell Mann
- 119 – Michael White
- 119 – Stuart Bingham
- 117, 102 – Joe Perry
- 115, 103, 100 – Neil Robertson
- 115 – Jimmy Robertson
- 114, 114 – Ryan Day
- 113, 100 – Robbie Williams
- 113 – Tom Ford
- 112 – Gary Wilson
- 112 – Thepchaiya Un-Nooh
- 109, 107 – Fergal O'Brien
- 109 – Tian Pengfei
- 108 – Lukas Kleckers
- 106 – Craig Steadman
- 106 – Dominic Dale
- 105, 104, 102 – Ding Junhui
- 104, 101 – Daniel Wells
- 104 – Mark King
- 102 – David Lilley
- 102 – Mei Xiwen
- 101 – Li Hang
- 100 – Chen Zifan
- 100 – Stephen Maguire
