= 2019 World Snooker Championship =

Professional snooker tournament

2019 Betfred World Snooker Championship

Tournament information
- Dates: 20 April – 6 May 2019
- Venue: Crucible Theatre
- City: Sheffield
- Country: England
- Organisation: World Snooker
- Format: Ranking event
- Total prize fund: £2,231,000
- Winner's share: £500,000
- Highest break: John Higgins (SCO) (143)

Final
- Champion: Judd Trump (ENG)
- Runner-up: John Higgins (SCO)
- Score: 18–9

The 2019 World Snooker Championship (officially the 2019 Betfred World Snooker Championship) was a professional snooker tournament that took place from 20 April to 6 May 2019 at the Crucible Theatre in Sheffield, England. It was the 43rd consecutive year the World Snooker Championship had been held at the Crucible, and the 20th and final ranking event of the 2018–19 snooker season. Qualifying for the tournament took place from 10 to 17 April 2019 at the English Institute of Sport in Sheffield. Sports betting company Betfred sponsored the event.

The winner of the title was Judd Trump, who defeated John Higgins 18–9 in the final to claim his first World Championship. In doing so, Trump became the 11th player to win all three Triple Crown titles at least once. Defending champion Mark Williams lost 9–13 to David Gilbert in the second round of the tournament. For the first time in the history of the World Snooker Championship, an amateur player appeared at the main stage of the event—debutant James Cahill defeated world number one Ronnie O'Sullivan in the first round, before being narrowly defeated by Stephen Maguire in a second round deciding frame.

The tournament featured 100 century breaks; at the time, this was the highest number recorded at an official snooker event (superseded at the 2021 World Championship). The final match alone included 11 centuries, the most ever scored in the final of a ranking event. Higgins compiled the highest break, a 143, in his semi-final win over Gilbert. Shaun Murphy defeated Luo Honghao in the first round 10–0, the first whitewash at the World Championship since 1992.

== Background ==
The World Snooker Championship is an annual cue sport tournament and the official world championship of the game of snooker. Founded in the late 19th century by British Army soldiers stationed in India, the sport was popular in the British Isles. However, in the modern era it has become increasingly popular worldwide, especially in East and Southeast Asian nations such as China, Hong Kong and Thailand. (Note: The "modern era" of snooker is understood to have started in 1969, when the game became fully professional.)

The championship features 32 professional and qualified amateur players competing in one-on-one snooker matches in a single elimination format, each played over several frames. The 32 competitors in the main tournament are selected using a combination of the top players in the world snooker rankings and a pre-tournament qualification stage. Joe Davis won the first World Championship in 1927, the final match being held in Camkin's Hall, Birmingham, England. Since 1977, the event has been held in the Crucible Theatre in Sheffield, England.

As of 2022, Stephen Hendry and Ronnie O’Sullivan are the event's most successful participants in the modern era, having both won the championship seven times. The 2018 World Championship had been won by Welsh professional player Mark Williams, who defeated Scotland's John Higgins 18–16 in the final. This was Williams' third world title, having won the championship in 2000 and 2003. The winner of the 2019 tournament earned prize money of £500,000, from a total pool of £2,231,000. The title sponsor of the event was sports betting company Betfred, who had sponsored the World Snooker Championship every year since 2015 (having previously sponsored the event from 2009 to 2012).

=== Format ===
The 2019 World Snooker Championship took place between 20 April and 6 May 2019 in Sheffield, England. The tournament was the last of twenty ranking events in the 2018/2019 season on the World Snooker Tour. It featured a 32-player main draw that was held at the Crucible Theatre, as well as a 128-player qualifying draw that was played at the English Institute of Sport from 10 to 17 April 2019, finishing three days before the start of the main draw. This was the 43rd consecutive year the tournament was held at the Crucible, and the 51st consecutive year the championship was contested using the modern knockout format.

The top 16 players in the latest world rankings automatically qualified for the main draw as seeded players. (Note: In the event of the defending champion being ranked outside the top 16, he would have replaced the player ranked world number 16 as an automatic qualifier.) Defending champion Mark Williams was automatically seeded first overall. The remaining 15 seeds were allocated based on the latest world rankings, which were released after the China Open, the penultimate event of the season. Matches in the first round of the main draw were played as the best of 19 frames. The number of frames required to win a match increased progressively with each successive round, leading up to the final match which was played as the best of 35 frames.

All 16 non-seeded spots in the main draw were filled with players who had advanced through the qualifying rounds. There were 128 players in the qualifying draw, which comprised 106 of the remaining 112 players on the World Snooker Tour, as well as 22 wildcard places allotted to non-tour players. These invited players included the women's world champion and the European junior champion. As with the main draw, half of the participants in the qualifying draw were seeded players; those ranked from 17th to 80th in the world rankings were allocated one of 64 seeds in order of their ranking, while the other competitors were placed randomly into the draw. To reach the main draw at the Crucible, players needed to win three best-of-19-frames qualifying matches.

=== Participant summary ===
Eight former world champions participated in the main tournament at the Crucible. They were Ronnie O'Sullivan (five titles: 2001, 2004, 2008, 2012, 2013), John Higgins (four titles: 1998, 2007, 2009, 2011), Mark Williams (defending champion, three titles: 2001, 2003, 2018), Mark Selby (three titles: 2014, 2016, 2017), Shaun Murphy (one title: 2005), Graeme Dott (one title: 2006), Neil Robertson (one title: 2010), and Stuart Bingham (one title: 2015). This was O'Sullivan's 27th consecutive appearance in the final stages of the World Championship since his debut in 1993, equalling Stephen Hendry's record for consecutive appearances, and three short of Steve Davis's overall record of 30 appearances. Four other former World Championship finalists also competed: Ali Carter (twice: 2008 and 2012), Judd Trump (once: 2011), Barry Hawkins (once: 2013), and Ding Junhui (once: 2016). The youngest player to participate in the main stage of the tournament was Luo Honghao at 19 years of age, while 46-year-old Mark Davis was the oldest; both players entered the main draw through qualifying.

Three former world champions participated in the qualifying rounds: Ken Doherty (1997), Peter Ebdon (2002) and Graeme Dott (2006). Of these, only Dott succeeded in qualifying for the main tournament at the Crucible. Also, four former World Championship finalists participated in the qualifying rounds: Jimmy White (six times: 1984 and 1990–1994), Nigel Bond (once: 1995), Matthew Stevens (twice: 2000 and 2005), and Ali Carter (twice: 2008 and 2012). Of these, only Carter qualified for the main tournament at the Crucible.

=== Prize fund ===
The total purse for the event was greater than for any prior snooker tournament. For the first time the total prize pool was over £2 million, with the winner being awarded £500,000. (Note: Prior to this, the highest prize purse was for the 2018 World Snooker Championship, with a total pool of £1,968,000, and £425,000 for the winner of the event.) The breakdown of prize money was:

- Winner: £500,000
- Runner-up: £200,000
- Semi-final: £100,000
- Quarter-final: £50,000
- Last 16: £30,000
- Last 32: £20,000
- Last 48: £15,000
- Last 80: £10,000
- Main stage highest break: £10,000
- Qualifying stage highest break: £1,000
- Total: £2,231,000

The prize for a maximum break in the main stage was £50,000.

== Tournament summary ==
=== Qualifying rounds ===
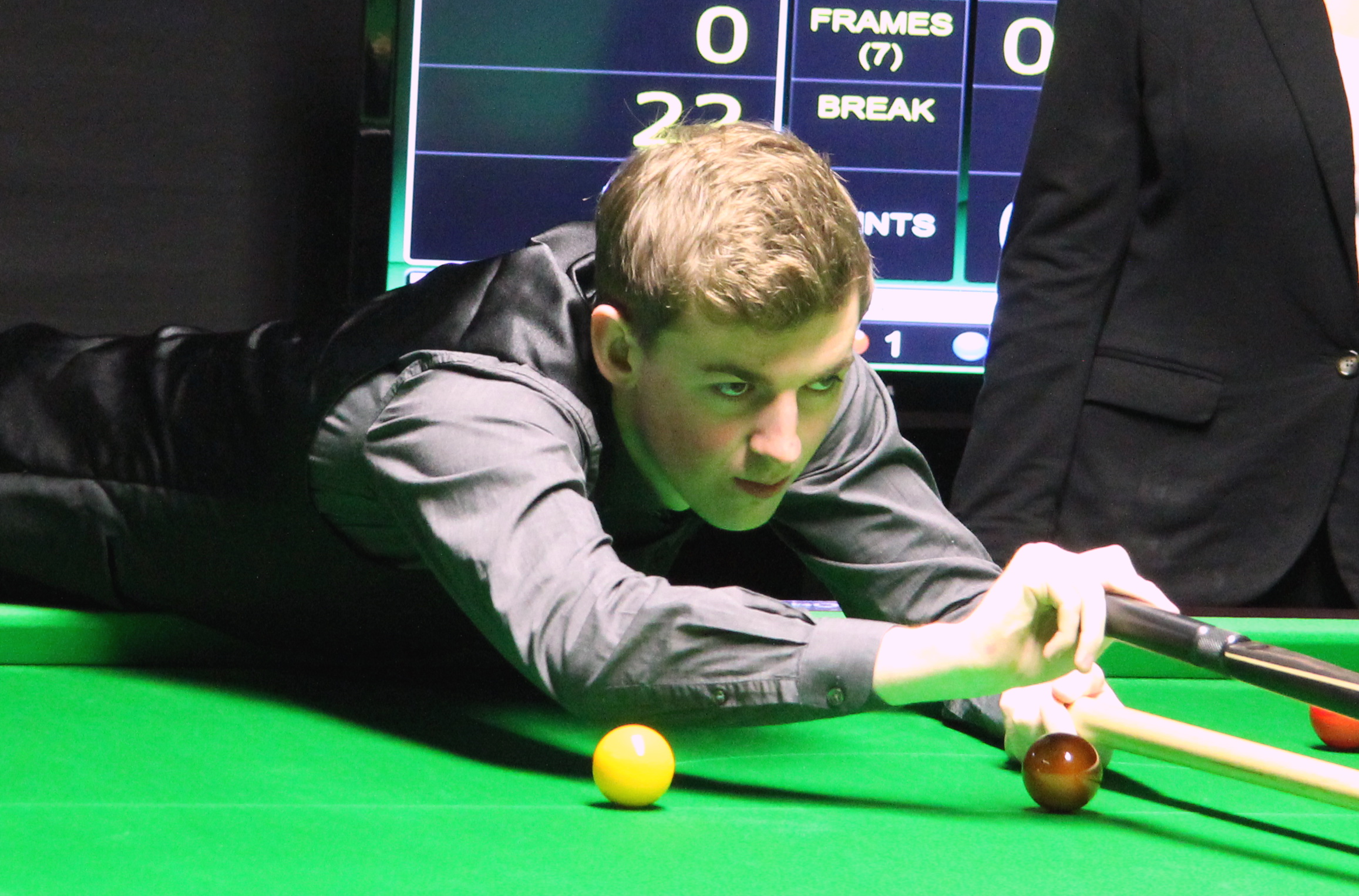
James Cahill became the first-ever amateur to qualify for the World Championship staged at the Crucible.

The top 16 seeds automatically qualified for the competition's main draw. The defending champion Mark Williams was seeded first, whilst other seeds were allocated based on the world rankings following the China Open. The remaining players competed in the preliminary qualifying rounds, and were required to win three best-of-19-frames matches to reach the main stage of the championship.

The qualifying rounds took place at the English Institute of Sport in Sheffield between 10 and 17 April 2019, with 16 players progressing to the main stage at the Crucible Theatre. A total of 128 players competed in the qualifying stage, including those tour players not automatically qualified for the main draw, as well as invited amateurs.

James Cahill became the first amateur player ever to qualify for the Crucible main stage of the World Championship, defeating fellow amateur Michael Judge 10–6 in the third qualifying round. Seven players—the largest number since 1999—advanced through the qualifying rounds to make their debuts at the main stage of the tournament. Besides Cahill, they were Scott Donaldson, Michael Georgiou (The first ever Cypriot to play at the crucible), Li Hang, Luo Honghao, Tian Pengfei and Zhao Xintong. The 2006 World Champion Graeme Dott and two-time finalist Ali Carter also qualified. Marco Fu failed to reach the main draw of the competition for the first time since 2004.

=== First round ===
The draw for the first round of the championship was made on 18 April 2019, the day after the conclusion of the qualifying rounds and two days before the start of the main event. The matches were drawn by World Snooker chairman Barry Hearn and 1991 World Champion John Parrott. The first round of the championship took place between 20 and 25 April 2019. All first round matches were played over two sessions as best-of-19 frames.

==== Top half ====
The tournament began with defending champion Mark Williams (seeded one) drawing qualifier Martin Gould. Both sessions of this first match were played on the opening day of the event. Gould won the first frame with a break of 64, before Williams took the next five with breaks of 55, 54 and 129, to lead 5–1. Gould won frames seven and eight, but Williams took the session's final frame with a break of 97 to lead 6–3. Williams opened up a lead in frame ten, before Gould made a clearance to force a re-spotted black. However, Williams potted the black to go ahead 7–3. Gould then won frame 11, but Williams claimed the next two frames to open up a five-frame lead, at 9–4. Despite Gould responding with breaks of 70, 87 and 76, to reduce his deficit to 7–9, Williams clinched the 17th frame to win the match 10–7. After his victory, Williams complained that World Snooker had not allowed his 12-year-old son backstage before the match, which the governing body denied.

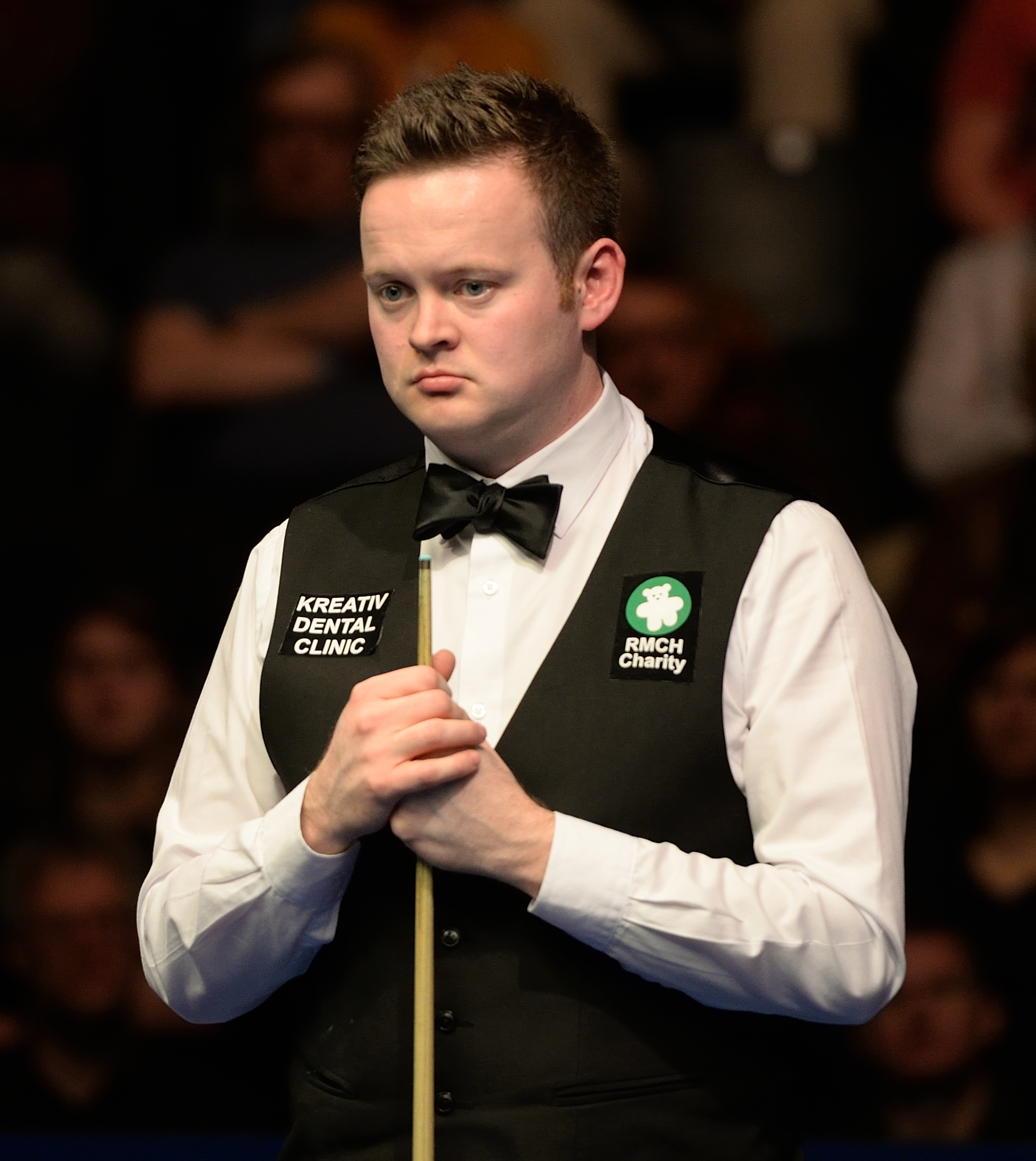
Shaun Murphy completed only the second-ever whitewash at the main stage of the World Championship.

Event debutant Luo Honghao was drawn against 13th seed Shaun Murphy. Finishing 10–0 to Murphy, the match was a whitewash, only the second ever to be witnessed at the Crucible (the first being John Parrott's defeat of Eddie Charlton in the first round of the 1992 championship). Luo accumulated just 89 points during the entire match, the lowest number of points ever scored in a World Championship match, and more than 100 fewer than the previous record low of 191 scored by Danny Fowler when he lost 1–10 to Stephen Hendry in the 1993 championship. Fourth seed Neil Robertson met qualifier, Michael Georgiou, in the first round. At the conclusion of the initial session, Georgiou was 0–9 behind, having scored even fewer points than Luo in the first nine frames of the match. However, he won frame ten on the resumption of play in the second session, with a break of 90, thus avoiding both the whitewash and the lowest points total. Robertson later won the match 10–1 to progress to the second round.

Fifth seed John Higgins played qualifier Mark Davis, who had won six of the pair's last seven encounters. Higgins took a 6–3 lead after the first session, but then spent the night in Royal Hallamshire Hospital because his brother Jason had fallen down some stairs at the venue and fractured his kneecap. Higgins won the match 10–7 the following day.

Two former world champions, 12th seed Stuart Bingham (2015 winner) and qualifier Graeme Dott (2006 winner), met in the first round of the competition. Bingham led 8–1 after the first session, and later 9–4, before Dott won five frames to level the match at 9–9. Bingham won the deciding frame after Dott missed a simple shot on the black ball. After the match, Dott explained that "serious sleeping problems" had caused him difficulties while playing.

==== Bottom half ====
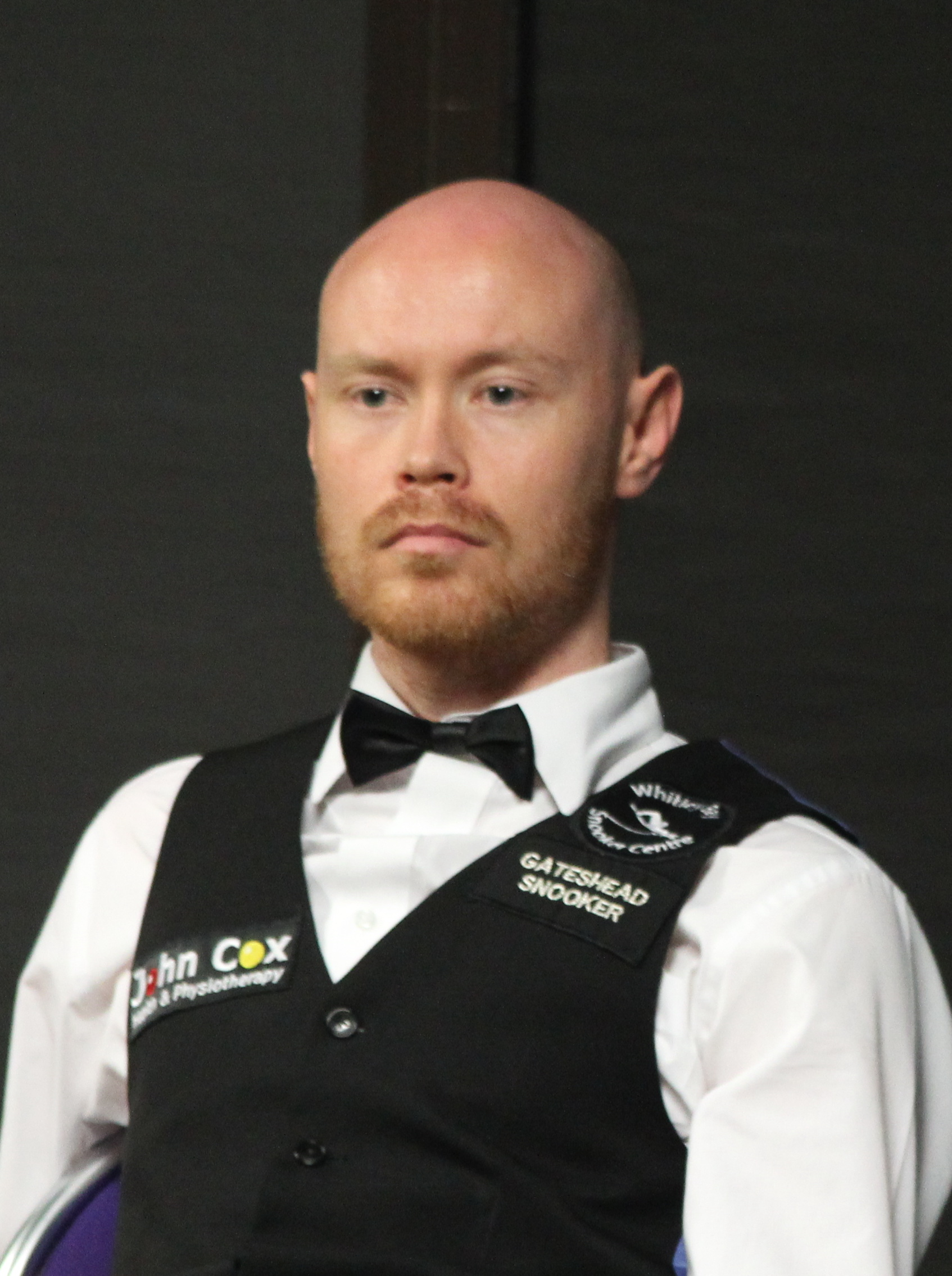
Qualifier Gary Wilson won the longest-ever World Championship frame at the Crucible in his first round decider against Luca Brecel.

The first round match between 14th seed Luca Brecel and qualifier Gary Wilson, which featured a large amount of tactical play, was suspended when the afternoon session overran, with Wilson leading 9–8. On resuming that evening, Brecel won frame 18 to send the match to a deciding frame. After first requiring a re-rack, this frame lasted for 79 minutes and 31 seconds, setting the record for the longest frame ever played at the Crucible (breaking the previous record set in 2016 by Mark Selby and Marco Fu by more than three minutes) which Wilson won. Tenth seed Ding Junhui played qualifier Anthony McGill. After leading 6–3 overnight, Ding won the match 10–7 to progress to the second round.

Having lost eight of his previous 15 first round matches at the Crucible, 15th seed Stephen Maguire played event debutant Tian Pengfei. In frame 17, Maguire was 7–9 down and needed a snooker (Note: In this instance, the word "snooker" refers to a type of shot rather than the game of snooker itself.) on the colours to stay in the match. He snookered Tian on the blue ball, but then missed a difficult shot to a baulk corner; however, on rebounding from the pocket, the blue hit the cue ball and went into the other baulk pocket. Maguire later described this fluke as "just outrageous" and admitted he "got lucky". He added the pink and black to steal the frame, and then took the next two frames to win the match 10–9. Three-time former world champion and third seed, Mark Selby, played debutant Zhao Xintong. Despite trailing 1–5 after the first six frames, Selby won nine of the next eleven frames, with two breaks of 131, to win 10–7.

Amateur player James Cahill drew the world number one Ronnie O'Sullivan, who had reached the finals of the other Triple Crown events earlier in the season. Cahill finished the first session with a 5–4 lead, and then went ahead 8–5 in the second session before O'Sullivan levelled the match at 8–8. Cahill missed a straightforward shot on a red ball after compiling an early break in frame 17; however, despite needing only the final pink and black to win, O'Sullivan missed the pink, allowing Cahill to clinch the frame. With a break of 56 in the next frame, Cahill won the match 10–8 to secure a place in the second round. This was Cahill's second win over the top-ranked player in the season, having defeated Mark Selby in the first round of the UK Championship five months earlier. Afterwards, O'Sullivan indicated that he had been unwell during the match, but former world champion Ken Doherty accused him of "playing too casually".

=== Second round ===
The last 16 players in the competition took part in the second round, which was played between 25 and 29 April, with matches completed over three sessions as best of 25 frames. Fourth seed Neil Robertson played 13th seed Shaun Murphy. The first session of the match featured a maximum break attempt by Murphy; with just two red balls remaining, he asked for the screen between the tables to be lifted, allowing the spectators in the other half of the auditorium to watch his attempt at a maximum, but he failed to finish it. Prior to this dramatic turn of events, Robertson had won the first three frames of the match, without Murphy attempting a pot. Robertson led 5–3 after the first session and 10–6 after the second. He later won the first three frames of the final session to win the match 13–6. Post-match, Murphy called Robertson "just too good" and "unplayable".

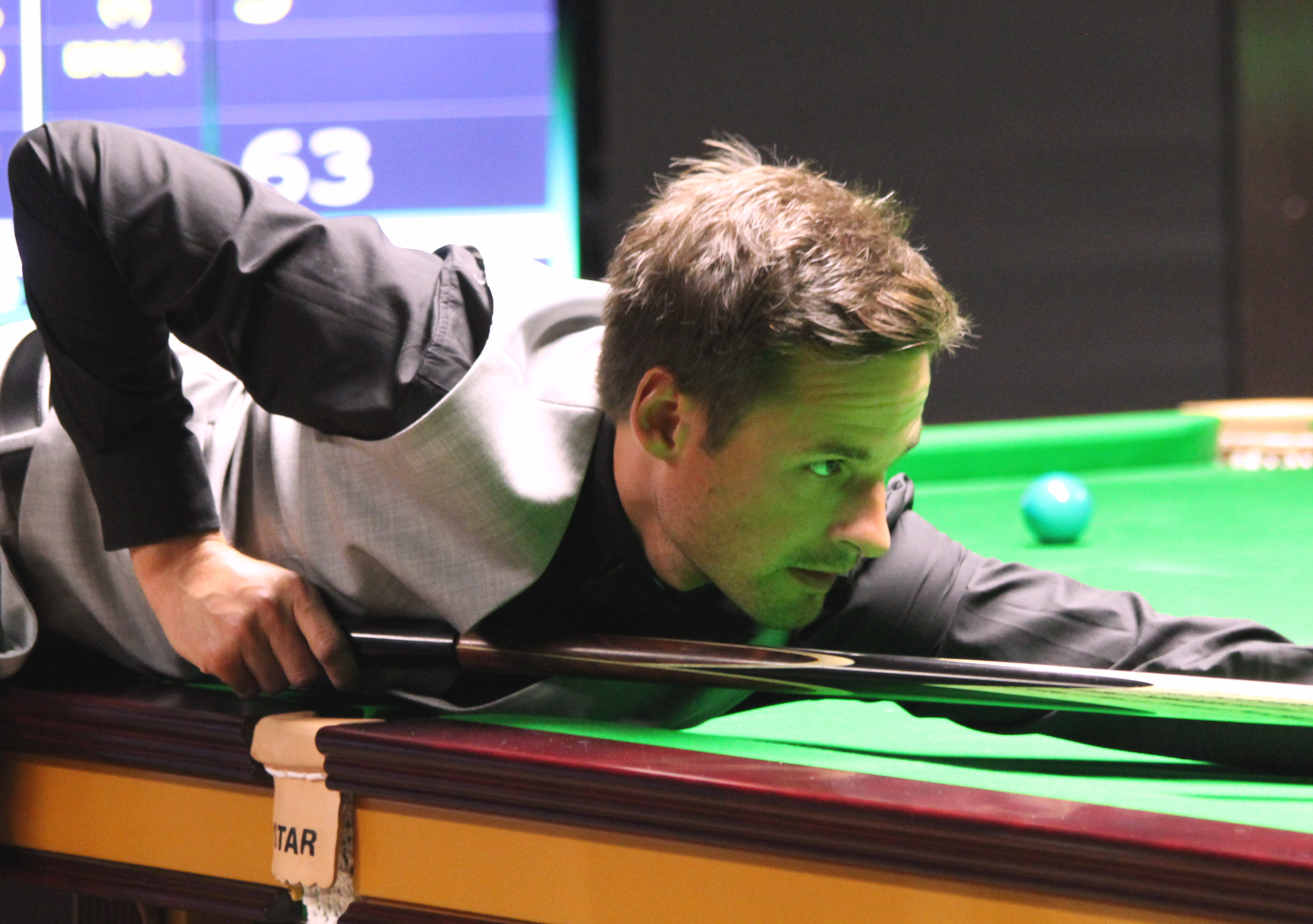
16th seed David Gilbert defeated the defending champion Mark Williams in the second round; Gilbert went on to the semi-finals.

Defending champion Mark Williams played 16th seed David Gilbert. After the first session, with Gilbert leading 5–3, Williams said he had been feeling chest pains during play. He was taken to Northern General Hospital overnight but returned the following morning for the second session of the match. He later tied the match 7–7, but was trailing again 7–9 after the second session. Gilbert then won the first four frames of the final session to win the match 13–9.

Amateur player James Cahill drew 15th seed Stephen Maguire. After the first two sessions, Maguire was ahead 5–3 and 9–7, but Cahill then took three of the first four frames in the third session to level the match at 10–10. He also won frame 21, to take the lead for the first time in the match, but Maguire drew level in the following frame. Both players missed shots in frame 23, with Cahill looking to win the frame before being penalised for a waistcoat foul, and later going in-off from a cannon, allowing Maguire to pull ahead again 12–11. Cahill won frame 24, after Maguire missed a green ball by a wide margin, taking the match to a deciding frame. Maguire won the decider, and the match, 13–12.

Three-time world champion Mark Selby played qualifier Gary Wilson. Despite trailing 3–5 after the first session, Selby won four of the first five frames in the second session to lead 7–6; however, Wilson took the last three frames of the session to lead 9–7. Selby later tied the match at 10–10, before Wilson won three consecutive frames to secure a place in the quarter-finals. Two former world champions, fifth seed John Higgins and 12th seed Stuart Bingham, met in the second round. Bingham took an early 4–1 lead, but Higgins won the remaining frames of the first session, with a 132 break in the eighth, to level at 4–4. The second session was even, with no more than two frames separating the players, and the match was tied again at 8–8 and 11–11. In frame 23, Bingham missed a plant on two reds, allowing Higgins to claim the next two frames and the match, 13–11. Bingham described the close-fought encounter as a "good battle" and Higgins admitted he was "over the moon" to have won.

Ninth seed and 2013 runner-up, Barry Hawkins, played eighth seed Kyren Wilson. This match included nine century breaks, setting a new record for the second round of the championships. Hawkins made four century breaks of 105, 130, 136, and 137 during the first session, including a maximum break attempt; Wilson also compiled a century in frame five. With four frames in a row ending with a 100+ break, this was the first time since the 1999 semi-final between Ronnie O'Sullivan and Stephen Hendry that four centuries had been compiled in consecutive frames in a World Championship match. After winning the first four frames of the match, Hawkins ended the first session with a 6–2 lead. Wilson won the second session of the match 5–3, to trail 7–9, before twice drawing level at 9–9 and 10–10 in the final session. Despite Hawkins pulling ahead, at 10–9 and 11–10, Wilson won the last three frames of the match to progress to the next round, 13–11.

Zhou Yuelong played Ali Carter in the only all-qualifier encounter of the second round. Zhou took four of the first five frames to lead 4–1, then led 5–3 after the first session, and held the lead at 9–7 after the second. On resuming the match in the final session, Carter won six straight frames to progress 13–9. Two former world finalists, Judd Trump and Ding Junhui, met in the second round. Trump took an early 5–1 lead in the first session, but Ding won eight of the next ten frames to lead 9–7 before the final session. Trump then took six frames in a row, including breaks of 93, 79, 54 and 103, to win the match 13–9.

=== Quarter-finals ===
The quarter-finals took place on 30 April and 1 May, and like the previous round, matches were played as best of 25 frames across three sessions. Ali Carter played Gary Wilson in an all-qualifier match. Despite this being his first World Championship quarter-final, and after losing the first three frames of the match, Wilson won five straight frames to lead 5–3 after the first session. The pair shared the second session, with both players winning four frames, bringing the score to 9–7 ahead of the final session. Carter won two of the next three frames, including a break of 128, to trail 9–10, before Wilson won the next three to progress 13–9. Post-match, Carter said, "You have to take your hat off to [Wilson]. I did not think he could play that good," noting that despite Wilson's low ranking of 32 "[he] has to be the favourite to win it now, the way he has been playing."

The 2019 Masters champion, Judd Trump, played 15th seed Stephen Maguire. Having won six straight frames to conclude his second-round match against Ding Junhui, Trump won another six consecutive frames at the start of this match, scoring breaks of 131, 67, 106, 78 and 101, to lead 7–1 after the first session. He looked set to win the match in the second session without needing to play the third, extending his lead to 9–1. However, Maguire won four of the remaining frames, to trail 5–11 by the end of the session. Trump won the match 13–6, after just three frames of the final session. Maguire was fined £250 for swearing in a post-match press conference when he was asked to summarise his performance in the match.

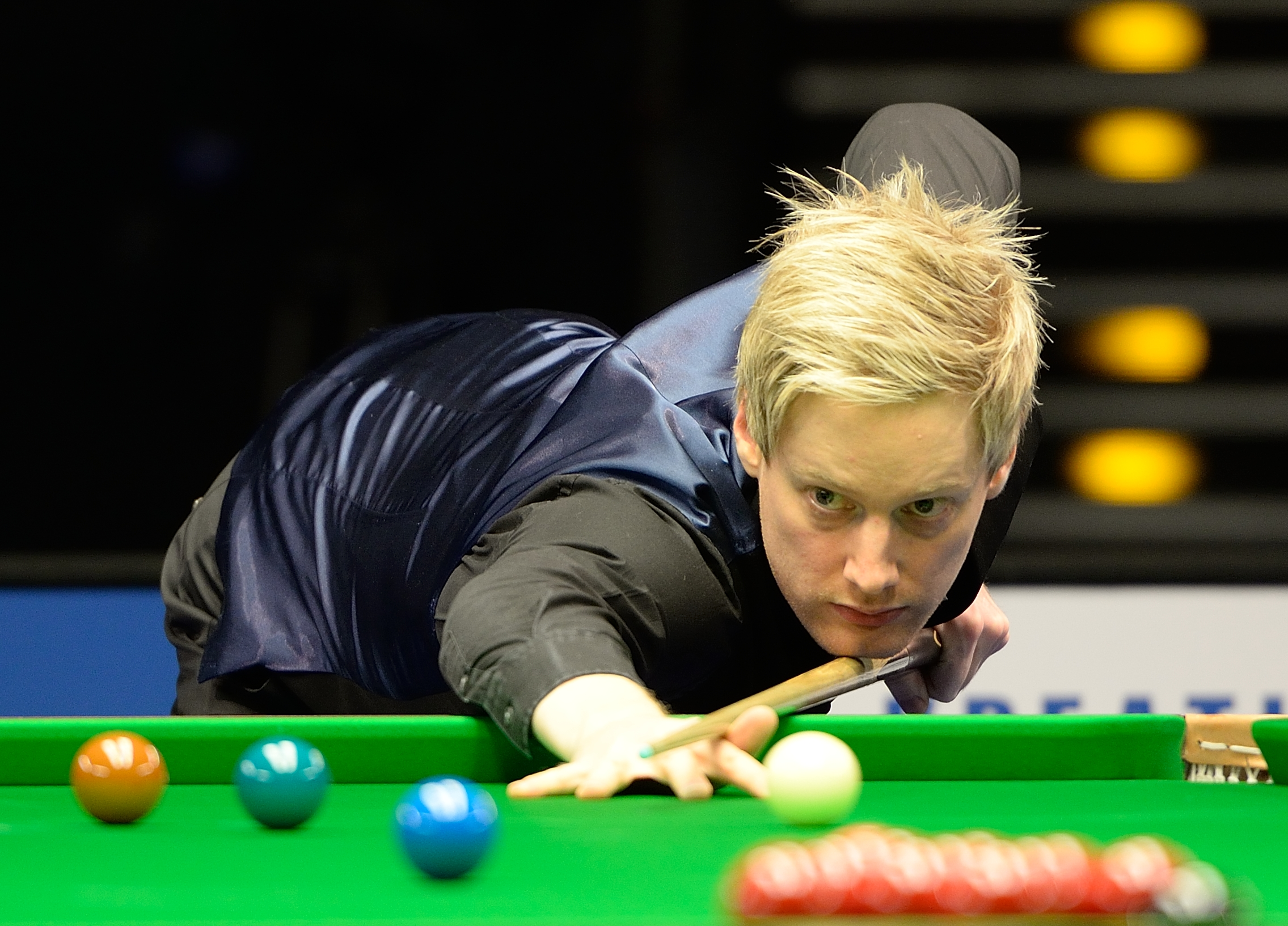
Fourth seed Neil Robertson lost to John Higgins in the quarter-finals.

Eighth seed Kyren Wilson played 16th seed David Gilbert. The pair had met earlier in the season, in the final of the 2019 German Masters, where Wilson had won the tournament 9–7. The two players shared the opening session of their quarter-final, 4–4; Gilbert then won six of the eight frames in the second session to lead 10–6 overnight. Wilson won two of the first three frames of the final session to trail 8–11, but Gilbert took the next two frames to win the match 13–8.

Four-time world champion John Higgins played fourth seed Neil Robertson in the last of the quarter-finals. Robertson took an early 3–1 lead, but Higgins tied the match at 4–4. Robertson pulled away to 7–4 at the start of the second session, before Higgins won five frames in a row to take a 9–7 lead. After sharing the first six frames of the final session, Higgins won the match 13–10, with a century break of 101 in the next frame, to progress to the semi-finals.

=== Semi-finals ===
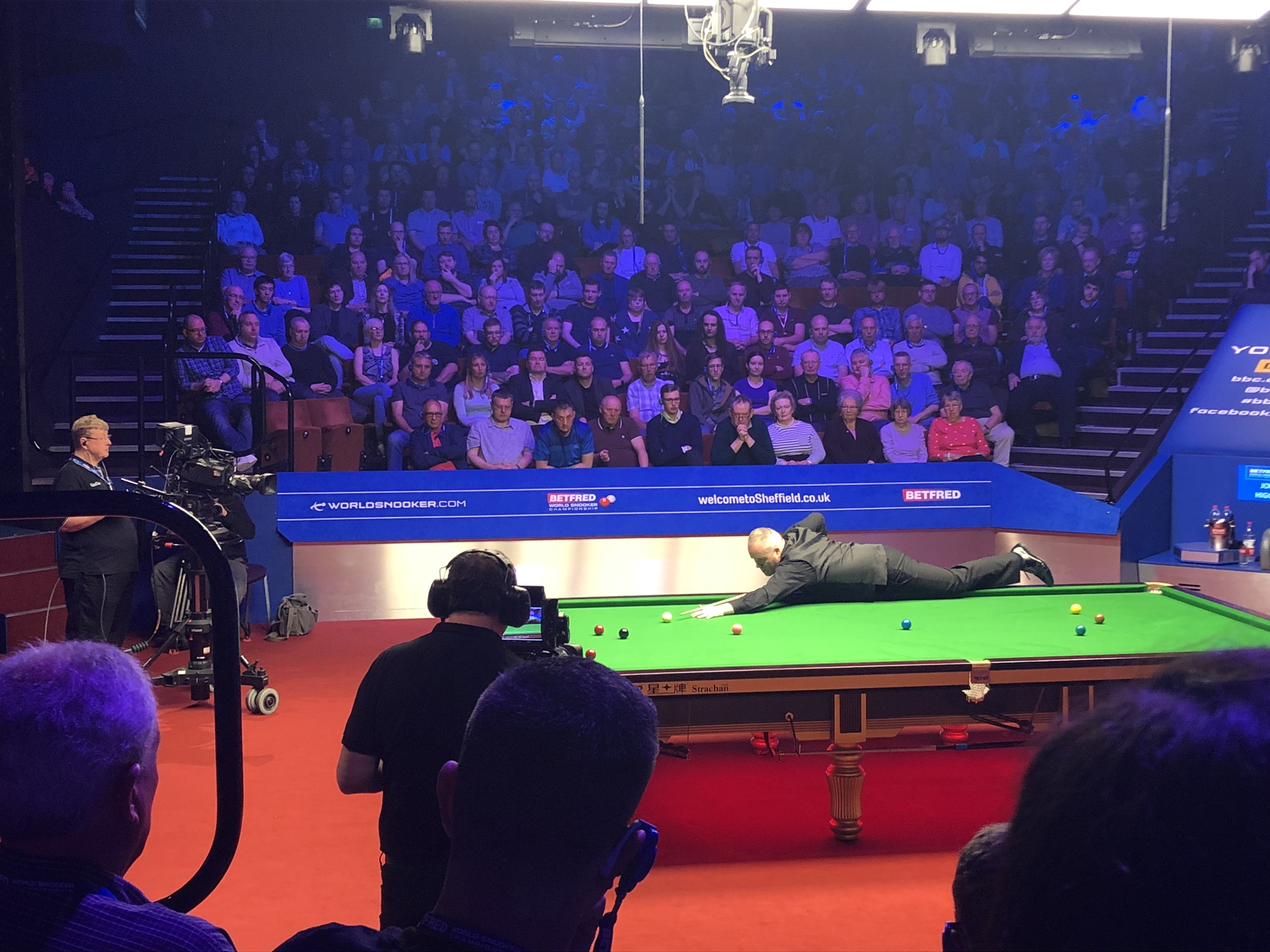
John Higgins (pictured at the event) defeated David Gilbert in the semi-finals to reach his third consecutive World Championship final, the eighth of his career.

The two semi-finals were played from 2 to 5 May, with the matches spread over four sessions as best of 33 frames. The first semi-final pitted four-time champion John Higgins against David Gilbert, who had never previously progressed past the second round of the championships. Higgins won the first two frames, but Gilbert tied the match at 2–2, with the help of a 94 break. Higgins then took a 3–2 lead, before Gilbert claimed the last three frames of the session, including a maximum break attempt, potting 15 red balls but failing a double on the black, to lead 5–3.

Gilbert won the first three frames of the second session, including a 125 break, to increase his lead to 8–3. He was ahead 56–17 in frame 12 but missed a frame-ball pink into a middle pocket, allowing Higgins to clear the table and clinch the frame. Higgins also won the next two frames, compiling breaks of 67, 52 and 58, to trail 6–8; however, Gilbert took the final two frames of the session to lead 10–6. Pundit John Virgo reflected that Higgins was "not with it", whilst six-time champion Steve Davis called Higgins' performance "ridiculous".

When the match resumed for the third session, a crowd member was ejected from the auditorium for shouting out immediately after the break off shot in the initial frame; Gilbert took the frame, increasing his lead to 11–6. Higgins won two of the next three frames to stay four behind at 8–12. He then compiled a 143 break, the highest of the tournament, in frame 21; this was also the 86th century break of the championship so far, tying the record for the number of centuries in a World Snooker Championship, set in 2015. Gilbert won the next frame, falling short of a century, with a break of 91. Higgins then won the final two frames of the session to reduce his deficit to 11–13.

Gilbert took the initial frame of the fourth (and final) session, but Higgins, having not led the match since mid-way through the first session, won the next four frames to go ahead 15–14. Gilbert then restored his lead by winning the next two frames, before Higgins scored a 139 break to level the score at 16–16, forcing a decider. Higgins won the final frame and the match after Gilbert missed the black ball from the spot. Both players gave emotional press conferences afterward, with Gilbert commenting, "I have never won anything, I have come close but this is the best couple of weeks I have had in my snooker career by a mile. It might be the closest I will come to winning the World Championship." Higgins apologized for his poor play during the match, and for bringing Gilbert "down to [his] level" in the first three sessions.

Judd Trump faced qualifier, Gary Wilson, in the second semi-final. They shared the opening session, 4–4, but Wilson later took a 6–5 lead with a break of 65. Trump won the next three frames with breaks of 73, 123 and 75, to lead 9–6, before Wilson compiled a 77 break, bringing the score to 9–7 after the first two sessions. Wilson won frame 17 with a break of 50; however, Trump took the next three frames, including a break of 114, which was the 87th century of the tournament (overtaking the previous all-time record of centuries compiled at any World Snooker Championship). Trump was 14–10 ahead at the end of the third session.

Wilson won the first frame of the final session, but Trump claimed the next three to win the match 17–11. Afterwards, Trump suggested that neither he nor Higgins had played particularly well in their respective semi-final matches, despite their both reaching the final. Wilson, ranked 30 in the world, said Judd deserved to win, but he commented on the poor playing conditions, saying: "I wasn't good enough ... but I've got to say that table is disgusting. It's running off all over the place, you're getting square bounces, kicks every other shot."

=== Final ===
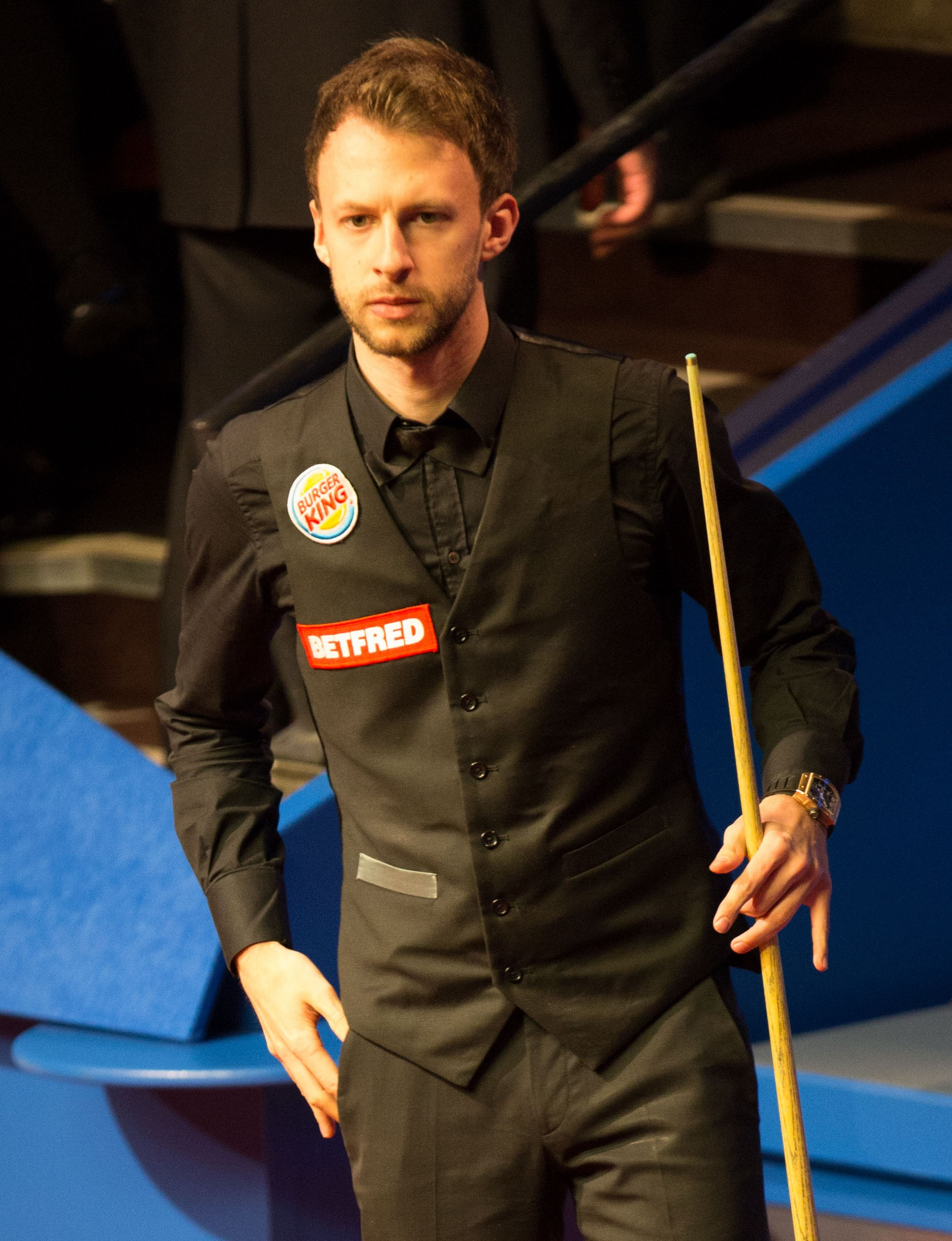
Judd Trump met John Higgins in the final, in a repeat of the 2011 World Championship final. On winning the match, Trump captured his first World Championship title, and completed a career Triple Crown.

The final was played over four sessions on 5 and 6 May, as a best-of-35-frames match. It was a repeat of the 2011 World Championship final between John Higgins and Judd Trump, when Higgins won the match 18–15 to claim his fourth world title. To reach the 2019 final, Higgins had defeated Mark Davis, Stuart Bingham, Neil Robertson and David Gilbert, while Trump had defeated Thepchaiya Un-Nooh, Ding Junhui, Stephen Maguire and Gary Wilson. This was Higgins' third consecutive World Championship final (having been defeated by Mark Selby in 2017 and Mark Williams in 2018), and his eighth overall. Higgins had previously won the World Snooker Championship four times (in 1998, 2007, 2009 and 2011). This was Trump's second world final, his first being the 2011 loss to Higgins.

Trump won the first two frames of the opening session, with breaks of 51 and 63. Higgins replied with a break of 139 to trail 1–2, before Trump scored a century of his own, a 105, to take a two-frame lead at the first mid-session interval. Breaks of 69, 34, 40 and 101 allowed Higgins to accumulate 244 unanswered points, claiming three consecutive frames to lead 4–3. Trump then tied the match at 4–4 by compiling the fourth century of the session.

At the beginning of the nine-frame evening session, Higgins compiled a break of 125, the third consecutive century of the match, to move ahead 5–4. Trump won the remaining eight frames of the session, including breaks of 135 and 114, to lead by seven frames overnight, 12–5. Steve Davis commented on the session: "I've seen some astonishing snooker here, a lot of it from Ronnie O'Sullivan, but that was a different type of astonishing. I am a little bit in shock. He is making a lot of very difficult shots seem very easy."

The third session opened with an attempt at a maximum break from Higgins, who potted 14 reds and 14 blacks before running out of position for the final red; he played a full-table double to pot the red ball, but then missed the following black. He also won frame 19, to trail 7–12, but Trump took the next three to extend his lead to 15–7. Higgins won the next two frames, which prevented the match from concluding with a session to spare. Trump attempted a maximum break of his own in frame 25, but he overcut a red into the middle pocket. Going into the evening session with a 16–9 lead, Trump won two straight frames to win the match 18–9 and claim the 2019 world title. This was the largest margin of victory in a World Championship final since 2009, when Higgins defeated Shaun Murphy by the same scoreline.

With eleven centuries between the two players, the final set the record for the most 100+ breaks in a single match, one more than the previous record held by Alan McManus and Ding Junhui in the semi-final of the 2016 World Championship. After the final, Higgins praised Trump's performance saying, "I was the lucky one to not have to pay for a ticket, he was just awesome." BBC pundit Steve Davis commented, "The standard in that final may have been the greatest we have ever seen and Judd Trump was at the heart of it." This was Trump's second Triple Crown title of the season after winning the Masters in January.

== Main draw ==
Numbers given in brackets after players' names show the seedings for the top 16 players in the competition. The sole amateur player in the championship is indicated with (a).

First round Best of 19 frames
20 April
Mark Williams (WAL) (1)	10
Martin Gould (ENG)	7
22 & 23 April
David Gilbert (ENG) (16)	10
Joe Perry (ENG)	7
24 April
Barry Hawkins (ENG) (9)	10
Li Hang (CHN)	1
24 & 25 April
Kyren Wilson (ENG) (8)	10
Scott Donaldson (SCO)	4
21 & 22 April
John Higgins (SCO) (5)	10
Mark Davis (ENG)	7
23 April
Stuart Bingham (ENG) (12)	10
Graeme Dott (SCO)	9
21 & 22 April
Shaun Murphy (ENG) (13)	10
Luo Honghao (CHN)	0
20 & 21 April
Neil Robertson (AUS) (4)	10
Michael Georgiou (CYP)	1
22 April
Mark Selby (ENG) (3)	10
Zhao Xintong (CHN)	7
20 & 21 April
Luca Brecel (BEL) (14)	9
Gary Wilson (ENG)	10
24 & 25 April
Jack Lisowski (ENG) (11)	6
Ali Carter (ENG)	10
23 & 24 April
Mark Allen (NIR) (6)	7
Zhou Yuelong (CHN)	10
23 & 24 April
Judd Trump (ENG) (7)	10
Thepchaiya Un-Nooh (THA)	9
20 & 21 April
Ding Junhui (CHN) (10)	10
Anthony McGill (SCO)	7
20 & 21 April
Stephen Maguire (SCO) (15)	10
Tian Pengfei (CHN)	9
22 & 23 April
Ronnie O'Sullivan (ENG) (2)	8
James Cahill (ENG) (a)	10

Second round Best of 25 frames
26 & 27 April
(Wales) Mark Williams (1)	9
(England) David Gilbert (16)	13
28 & 29 April
(England) Barry Hawkins (9)	11
(England) Kyren Wilson (8)	13
27, 28 & 29 April
(Scotland) John Higgins (5)	13
(England) Stuart Bingham (12)	11
25 & 26 April
(England) Shaun Murphy (13)	6
(Australia) Neil Robertson (4)	13
25, 26 & 27 April
(England) Mark Selby (3)	10
(England) Gary Wilson	13
28 & 29 April
(England) Ali Carter	13
(China) Zhou Yuelong	9
27, 28 & 29 April
(England) Judd Trump (7)	13
(China) Ding Junhui (10)	9
26 & 27 April
(Scotland) Stephen Maguire (15)	13
(England) James Cahill (a)	12

Quarter-finals; Best of 25 frames
30 April & 1 May
(England) David Gilbert (16)	13
(England) Kyren Wilson (8)	8
30 April & 1 May
(Scotland) John Higgins (5)	13
(Australia) Neil Robertson (4)	10
30 April & 1 May
(England) Gary Wilson	13
(England) Ali Carter	9
30 April & 1 May
(England) Judd Trump (7)	13
(Scotland) Stephen Maguire (15)	6

Semi-finals; Best of 33 frames
2, 3 & 4 May
(England) David Gilbert (16)	16
(Scotland) John Higgins (5)	17
2, 3 & 4 May
(England) Gary Wilson	11
(England) Judd Trump (7)	17

Final; Best of 35 frames
5 & 6 May
(Scotland) John Higgins (5)	9
(England) Judd Trump (7)	18

Final: (Best of 35 frames) Crucible Theatre, Sheffield, 5 & 6 May 2019; Referee: Leo Scullion
John Higgins (5); Scotland				9–18			Judd Trump (7); England			
Session 1: 4–4
Frame	1	2	3	4	5	6	7	8	9	10
Higgins	1	45	139^{†} (139)	0	70^{†} (69)	74^{†}	101^{†} (101)	4	N/A	N/A
Trump	66^{†} (51)	72^{†} (63)	0	105^{†} (105)	8	0	0	103^{†} (103)	N/A	N/A
Session 2: 1–8 (5–12)
Frame	1	2	3	4	5	6	7	8	9	10
Higgins	125^{†} (125)	0	4	45	0	30	28	20	19	N/A
Trump	1	66^{†}	139^{†} (135)	67^{†}	118^{†} (114)	64^{†}	95^{†} (71)	70^{†} (58)	85^{†} (70)	N/A
Session 3: 4–4 (9–16)
Frame	1	2	3	4	5	6	7	8	9	10
Higgins	113^{†} (113)	60^{†} (59)	0	0	0	92^{†} (67)	79^{†} (70)	0	N/A	N/A
Trump	0	35	101^{†} (101)	72^{†} (71)	126^{†} (126)	16	11	104^{†} (104)	N/A	N/A
Session 4: 0–2 (9–18)
Frame	1	2	3	4	5	6	7	8	9	10
Higgins	0	1	N/A	N/A	N/A	N/A	N/A	N/A	N/A	N/A
Trump	94^{†} (94)	63^{†} (62)	N/A	N/A	N/A	N/A	N/A	N/A	N/A	N/A
139				Highest break			135			
4				Century breaks			7			
8				50+ breaks			15			
(England) Judd Trump wins the 2019 Betfred World Snooker Championship. † = Winner of frame

== Qualifying ==
Qualifying for the 2019 World Snooker Championship took place from 10 to 17 April 2019 at the English Institute of Sport in Sheffield, using a 12-table set-up. Starting with a pool of 128 players, the qualifying competition consisted of three knock-out rounds, with all matches played over two sessions as best of 19 frames. The 16 winners of the third round matches progressed to the main stages of the tournament at the Crucible Theatre.

The tour players (ranked outside the top-16) were joined by wildcard amateur players who achieved success through the WPBSA qualifying criteria:

- 2018–19 Challenge Tour—top four ranked players: Brandon Sargeant, David Grace, Mitchell Mann, David Lilley
- EBSA European U-21 / U-18 Championship 2019 semi-finalists: Jackson Page, Aaron Hill, Ross Bulman, Dylan Emery, Florian Nüßle
- World Women's Snooker Tour—top two ranked players: Ng On-yee, Reanne Evans
- World Seniors Snooker Tour—top ranked player: Johnathan Bagley
- African champion: Mostafa Dorgham (Note: Dorgham was the runner up of the event.)
- Americas champion: Igor Figueiredo
- Oceania champion: Adam Lilley
- CBSA nomination: Pang Junxu
- Decided by WPBSA: Farakh Ajaib, James Cahill, Adam Duffy, Andy Hicks, Luke Simmonds, Michael Judge (Note: Zhang Jiankang, who withdrew with visa problems, was replaced by Michael Judge.)

Players ranked 17 to 80 in the 2018/2019 world rankings were seeded 1 to 64 in qualifying. (Note: Jamie Jones, ranked 61, did not compete in the championships because he was serving a 12-month suspension.) The remaining tour players plus the invited amateurs were drawn randomly. (Note: Li Yuan, ranked 97, did not compete in the championships.) There were 64 matches in the first round of qualifying. Each match was played between a seeded and a non-seeded player.

Round 1 Best of 19 frames			Round 2 Best of 19 frames			Round 3 Best of 19 frames
1	Ryan Day (WAL)	10
	Oliver Lines (ENG)	6	1	(Wales) Ryan Day	3
64	Tian Pengfei (CHN)	10	64	(China) Tian Pengfei	10
	Soheil Vahedi (IRN)	5				64	(China) Tian Pengfei	10
32	Matthew Stevens (WAL)	10				32	(Wales) Matthew Stevens	8
	Thor Chuan Leong (MAS)	3	32	(Wales) Matthew Stevens	10
33	Chris Wakelin (ENG)	10	33	(England) Chris Wakelin	7
	Fan Zhengyi (CHN)	5
16	Gary Wilson (ENG)	10
	Sanderson Lam (ENG)	5	16	(England) Gary Wilson	10
49	Dominic Dale (WAL)	10	49	(Wales) Dominic Dale	3
	Chris Totten (SCO)	5				16	(England) Gary Wilson	10
17	Liang Wenbo (CHN)	10				17	(China) Liang Wenbo	6
	Basem Eltahhan (EGY)	0	17	(China) Liang Wenbo	10
48	Rory McLeod (ENG)	8		(England) David Grace	7
	David Grace (ENG)	10
41	Robbie Williams (ENG)	10
	Sam Baird (ENG)	8	41	(England) Robbie Williams	8
24	Marco Fu (HKG)	7		(China) Luo Honghao	10
	Luo Honghao (CHN)	10					(China) Luo Honghao	10
56	Sam Craigie (ENG)	10				9	(England) Tom Ford	8
	Rhys Clark (SCO)	2	56	(England) Sam Craigie	8
9	Tom Ford (ENG)	10	9	(England) Tom Ford	10
	Ross Muir (SCO)	3
40	Sunny Akani (THA)	10
	Chen Zifan (CHN)	6	40	(Thailand) Sunny Akani	5
25	Robert Milkins (ENG)	10	25	(England) Robert Milkins	10
	Luke Simmonds (ENG)	4				25	(England) Robert Milkins	8
57	Duane Jones (WAL)	10				8	(Scotland) Anthony McGill	10
	Kishan Hirani (WAL)	5	57	(Wales) Duane Jones	5
8	Anthony McGill (SCO)	10	8	(Scotland) Anthony McGill	10
	Ashley Hugill (ENG)	8
5	Graeme Dott (SCO)	10
	Hamza Akbar (PAK)	2	5	(Scotland) Graeme Dott	10
60	Xu Si (CHN)	10	60	(China) Xu Si	4
	Sean O'Sullivan (ENG)	2				5	(Scotland) Graeme Dott	10
28	Stuart Carrington (ENG)	6				37	(Norway) Kurt Maflin	2
	Pang Junxu (CHN)	10		(China) Pang Junxu	7
37	Kurt Maflin (NOR)	10	37	(Norway) Kurt Maflin	10
	Mitchell Mann (ENG)	3
12	Li Hang (CHN)	10
	Niu Zhuang (CHN)	5	12	(China) Li Hang	10
53	Ian Burns (ENG)	10	53	(England) Ian Burns	8
	Farakh Ajaib (ENG)	7				12	(China) Li Hang	10
21	Ben Woollaston (ENG)	10				21	(England) Ben Woollaston	8
	Elliot Slessor (ENG)	7	21	(England) Ben Woollaston	10
44	Mike Dunn (ENG)	7		(England) Nigel Bond	4
	Nigel Bond (ENG)	10
45	Daniel Wells (WAL)	10
	Jamie Clarke (WAL)	5	45	(Wales) Daniel Wells	10
20	Hossein Vafaei (IRN)	10	20	(Iran) Hossein Vafaei	6
	Zhang Anda (CHN)	4				45	(Wales) Daniel Wells	8
52	Gerard Greene (NIR)	10				13	(England) Martin Gould	10
	Aaron Hill (IRL)	7	52	(Northern Ireland) Gerard Greene	6
13	Martin Gould (ENG)	10	13	(England) Martin Gould	10
	Mostafa Dorgham (EGY)	0
36	Michael Georgiou (CYP)	10
	Lee Walker (WAL)	7	36	(Cyprus) Michael Georgiou	10
29	Peter Ebdon (ENG)	10	29	(England) Peter Ebdon	8
	Harvey Chandler (ENG)	4				36	(Cyprus) Michael Georgiou	10
61	Mei Xiwen (CHN)	10				4	(China) Yan Bingtao	8
	Florian Nüßle (AUT)	3	61	(China) Mei Xiwen	8
4	Yan Bingtao (CHN)	10	4	(China) Yan Bingtao	10
	Lukas Kleckers (GER)	3
3	Ali Carter (ENG)	10
	Paul Davison (ENG)	1	3	(England) Ali Carter	10
62	Jimmy White (ENG)	10	62	(England) Jimmy White	4
	Ross Bulman (IRL)	5				3	(England) Ali Carter	10
30	Michael White (WAL)	10					(England) John Astley	4
	Andy Hicks (ENG)	4	30	(Wales) Michael White	6
35	Yuan Sijun (CHN)	8		(England) John Astley	10
	John Astley (ENG)	10
14	Ricky Walden (ENG)	10
	Alfie Burden (ENG)	7	14	(England) Ricky Walden	9
51	Eden Sharav (ISR)	10	51	(Israel) Eden Sharav	10
	David Lilley (ENG)	7				51	(Israel) Eden Sharav	6
19	Zhou Yuelong (CHN)	10				19	(China) Zhou Yuelong	10
	Robin Hull (FIN)	7	19	(China) Zhou Yuelong	10
46	Liam Highfield (ENG)	10	46	(England) Liam Highfield	5
	Hammad Miah (ENG)	7
43	Fergal O'Brien (IRL)	10
	Jackson Page (WAL)	4	43	(Republic of Ireland) Fergal O'Brien	4
22	Mark Davis (ENG)	10	22	(England) Mark Davis	10
	Rod Lawler (ENG)	6				22	(England) Mark Davis	10
54	Alexander Ursenbacher (SUI)	4				11	(China) Lyu Haotian	7
	Jordan Brown (NIR)	10		(Northern Ireland) Jordan Brown	0
11	Lyu Haotian (CHN)	10	11	(China) Lyu Haotian	10
	Ashley Carty (ENG)	5
38	Mark Joyce (ENG)	10
	Billy Joe Castle (ENG)	2	38	(England) Mark Joyce	5
27	Thepchaiya Un-Nooh (THA)	10	27	(Thailand) Thepchaiya Un-Nooh	10
	Johnathan Bagley (ENG)	4				27	(Thailand) Thepchaiya Un-Nooh	10
59	Joe O'Connor (ENG)	10				59	(England) Joe O'Connor	6
	Joe Swail (NIR)	1	59	(England) Joe O'Connor	10
6	Jimmy Robertson (ENG)	10	6	(England) Jimmy Robertson	9
	Chen Feilong (CHN)	0
7	Xiao Guodong (CHN)	10
	Jak Jones (WAL)	5	7	(China) Xiao Guodong	9
58	Peter Lines (ENG)	9		(Republic of Ireland) Michael Judge	10
	Michael Judge (IRL)	10				(Republic of Ireland) Michael Judge		6
26	Michael Holt (ENG)	10				(England) James Cahill		10
	Brandon Sargeant (ENG)	5	26	(England) Michael Holt	7
39	Andrew Higginson (ENG)	9		(England) James Cahill	10
	James Cahill (ENG)	10
10	Mark King (ENG)	10
	Igor Figueiredo (BRA)	4	10	(England) Mark King	5
55	Lu Ning (CHN)	10	55	(China) Lu Ning	10
	Allan Taylor (ENG)	4				55	(China) Lu Ning	9
23	Scott Donaldson (SCO)	10				23	(Scotland) Scott Donaldson	10
	Craig Steadman (ENG)	8	23	(Scotland) Scott Donaldson	10
42	Ken Doherty (IRL)	10	42	(Republic of Ireland) Ken Doherty	4
	Andy Lee (HKG)	8
47	Anthony Hamilton (ENG)	10
	James Wattana (THA)	9	47	(England) Anthony Hamilton	7
18	Matthew Selt (ENG)	10	18	(England) Matthew Selt	10
	Dylan Emery (WAL)	3				18	(England) Matthew Selt	4
50	Zhao Xintong (CHN)	10				50	(China) Zhao Xintong	10
	Adam Lilley (NZL)	2	50	(China) Zhao Xintong	10
15	Noppon Saengkham (THA)	10	15	(Thailand) Noppon Saengkham	5
	Adam Stefanow (POL)	3
34	Alan McManus (SCO)	10
	Ng On-yee (HKG)	6	34	(Scotland) Alan McManus	8
31	Martin O'Donnell (ENG)	10	31	(England) Martin O'Donnell	10
	Adam Duffy (ENG)	6				31	(England) Martin O'Donnell	3
63	Zhang Yong (CHN)	10				2	(England) Joe Perry	10
	Reanne Evans (ENG)	2	63	(China) Zhang Yong	1
2	Joe Perry (ENG)	10	2	(England) Joe Perry	10
	Simon Lichtenberg (GER)	1

== Century breaks ==
=== Main stage centuries ===
The main stage of the 2019 World Snooker Championship yielded 100 centuries, made by 23 players. The highest break of the tournament, a 143, was compiled by John Higgins in his semi-final match with David Gilbert.

The championship broke a number of records in terms of century breaks, including the total number compiled in the main stage of a snooker tournament: there were 14 more centuries than the 86 recorded in both the 2015 and the 2016 championships. The final featured 11 century breaks, the highest number ever compiled in a single match, one more than the ten centuries in the 2016 semi-final between Ding Junhui and Allan McManus. Judd Trump equalled Ding's record of seven centuries made by one player in a world championship match.

- 143, 139, 139, 135, 132, 132, 130, 125, 113, 101, 101, 100 – John Higgins
- 141, 135, 131, 126, 123, 114, 114, 106, 105, 104, 103, 103, 101, 101 – Judd Trump
- 140, 134, 134, 117, 115, 109, 106, 100 – Gary Wilson
- 139, 125, 113, 109, 105, 102, 100 – David Gilbert
- 138, 132, 131, 125, 111, 104, 100 – Kyren Wilson
- 138, 123, 112, 109, 102, 101 – Shaun Murphy
- 137, 136, 130, 105 – Barry Hawkins
- 136 – Joe Perry
- 135, 128, 102 – Ali Carter
- 134, 129, 106 – Ding Junhui
- 131, 131, 120, 102 – Mark Selby
- 131, 125, 122, 121, 110, 105, 103 – Stephen Maguire
- 131 – Mark Allen
- 131 – Luca Brecel
- 129, 105, 101 – Mark Williams
- 127, 120, 120, 114, 106, 100 – Neil Robertson
- 124, 101 – Jack Lisowski
- 114 – Graeme Dott
- 112, 107, 106 – Stuart Bingham
- 106, 105, 101 – Zhou Yuelong
- 104, 100 – Tian Pengfei
- 104 – Ronnie O'Sullivan
- 101 – James Cahill

=== Qualifying stage centuries ===
A total of 122 century breaks were made by 57 players during the qualifying stage of the World Championship.

- 146, 121, 118, 113 – Noppon Saengkham
- 143, 143, 116, 114, 111 – Matthew Stevens
- 141, 133, 122, 119, 114 – Liang Wenbo
- 140, 135, 103 – Graeme Dott
- 139, 109, 107 – Chris Wakelin
- 138, 128 – Marco Fu
- 138, 124, 122, 102, 100 – Joe O'Connor
- 138, 107 – Thepchaiya Un-Nooh
- 136, 136, 115, 106 – Zhou Yuelong
- 136, 113, 107, 100, 100 – Daniel Wells
- 136, 106 – Michael Holt
- 136 – Elliot Slessor
- 135, 113 – Lu Ning
- 135, 100 – Lyu Haotian
- 134, 112, 100 – Gary Wilson
- 133, 125 – Tian Pengfei
- 133, 119, 105 – Xiao Guodong
- 132, 102, 100 – Martin Gould
- 132 – Eden Sharav
- 131, 119, 118, 113, 103, 100 – James Cahill
- 131, 118, 116 – Anthony McGill
- 130, 102 – Scott Donaldson
- 130 – Andy Hicks
- 130 – Alan McManus
- 128, 103 – Yan Bingtao
- 128 – Hossein Vafaei
- 127, 120, 102, 101 – Ali Carter
- 127, 110, 102, 100 – Joe Perry
- 127, 106 – Sam Craigie
- 124, 103 – Zhao Xintong
- 122, 109, 102 – Mark Davis
- 121, 117, 101 – Michael Georgiou
- 121 – Kurt Maflin
- 121 – Alexander Ursenbacher
- 120 – Johnathan Bagley
- 119, 100 – Stuart Carrington
- 118 – Gerard Greene
- 117 – Ashley Carty
- 116 – Brandon Sargeant
- 116 – Soheil Vahedi
- 116 – Xu Si
- 114, 100 – Ben Woollaston
- 114 – Robbie Williams
- 112 – Zhang Anda
- 111, 108 – John Astley
- 111 – Li Hang
- 109 – Niu Zhuang
- 108, 102 – Ian Burns
- 106, 101 – Tom Ford
- 106 – Sam Baird
- 106 – Luo Honghao
- 105, 101 – Mei Xiwen
- 103 – Lukas Kleckers
- 102 – David Lilley
- 101 – Martin O'Donnell
- 101 – Sunny Akani
- 100 – Dominic Dale

== Coverage ==
The 2019 World Snooker Championship was broadcast live in the United Kingdom by BBC Television and BBC Online, as well as on Eurosport. Internationally, the event was broadcast by DAZN in Canada and the United States, by SKY in New Zealand, and by Now TV in Hong Kong.

World Snooker live streamed the event internationally on Facebook, doing so for the second time. Coverage of the qualifying rounds was also live streamed on Facebook, Eurosport Player and selected betting sites.

In Scotland, the BBC was criticised for showing the World Championship on BBC Scotland, rather than a speech by Scotland's first minister Nicola Sturgeon on Scottish independence. The BBC defended the decision, explaining that the speech had been broadcast live on its BBC Scotland news website.
