= 2015 German Masters =

2015 Kreativ Dental German Masters

Tournament information
- Dates: 4–8 February 2015
- Venue: Tempodrom
- City: Berlin
- Country: Germany
- Organisation: World Snooker
- Format: Ranking event
- Total prize fund: €341,737
- Winner's share: €80,000
- Highest break: Judd Trump (ENG) (147)

Final
- Champion: Mark Selby (ENG)
- Runner-up: Shaun Murphy (ENG)
- Score: 9–7

The 2015 German Masters (officially the 2015 Kreativ Dental German Masters) was a professional ranking snooker tournament that took place between 4–8 February 2015 at the Tempodrom in Berlin, Germany. It was the sixth ranking event of the 2014/2015 season.

Judd Trump made the 113th official maximum break during his quarter-final match against Mark Selby.

Ding Junhui was the defending champion, but he lost 4–5 against Ryan Day in the last 32.

Selby won his fifth ranking title by defeating Shaun Murphy 9–7 in the final.

== Prize fund ==
The breakdown of prize money for this year is shown below:

- Winner: €80,000
- Runner-up: €35,000
- Semi-final: €20,000
- Quarter-final: €10,000
- Last 16: €5,000
- Last 32: €3,000
- Last 64: €1,500
- Televised highest break: €4,000
- Maximum break: €6,737
- Total: €341,737

== Main draw ==
Impressions

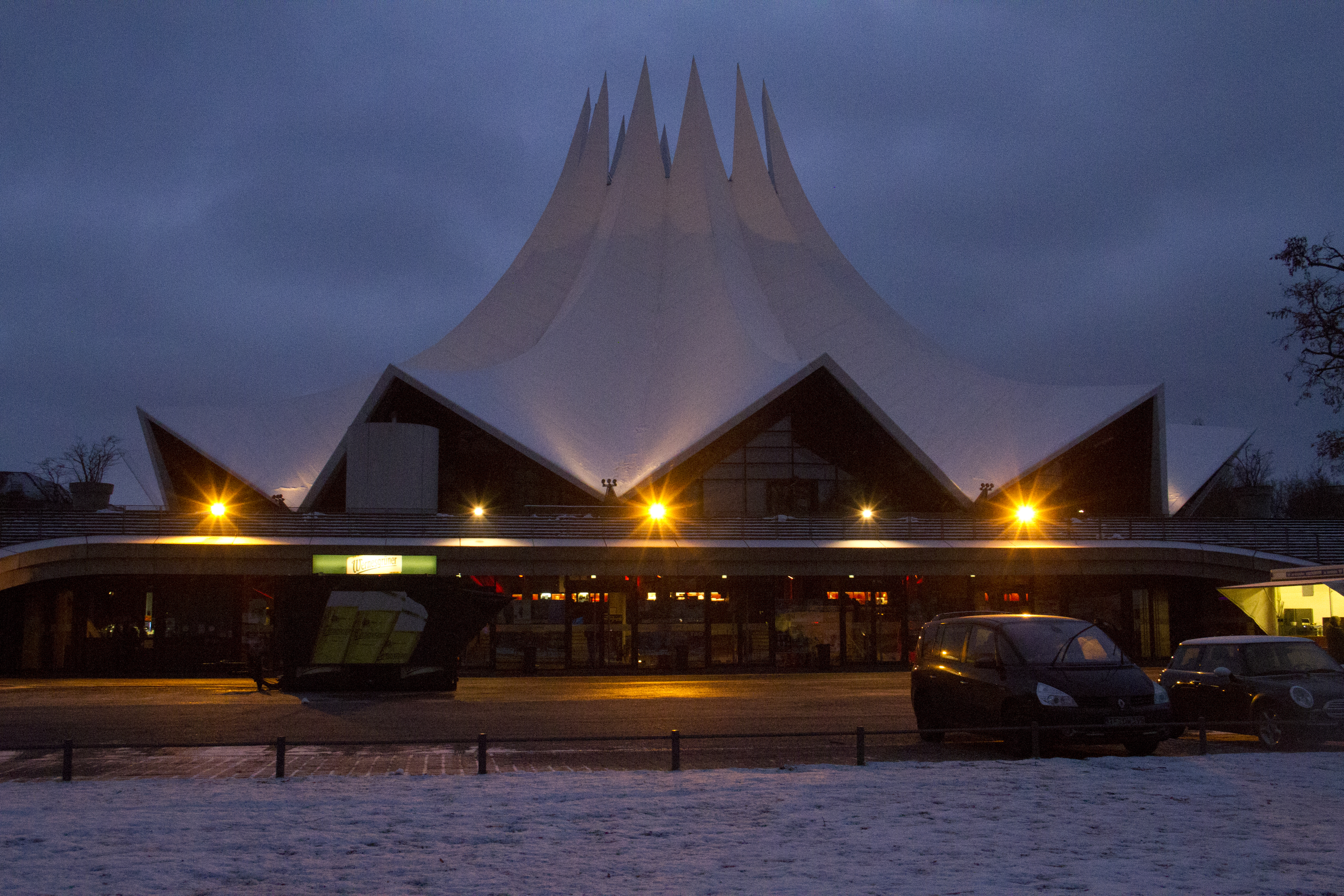
The venue at the first night of the tournament

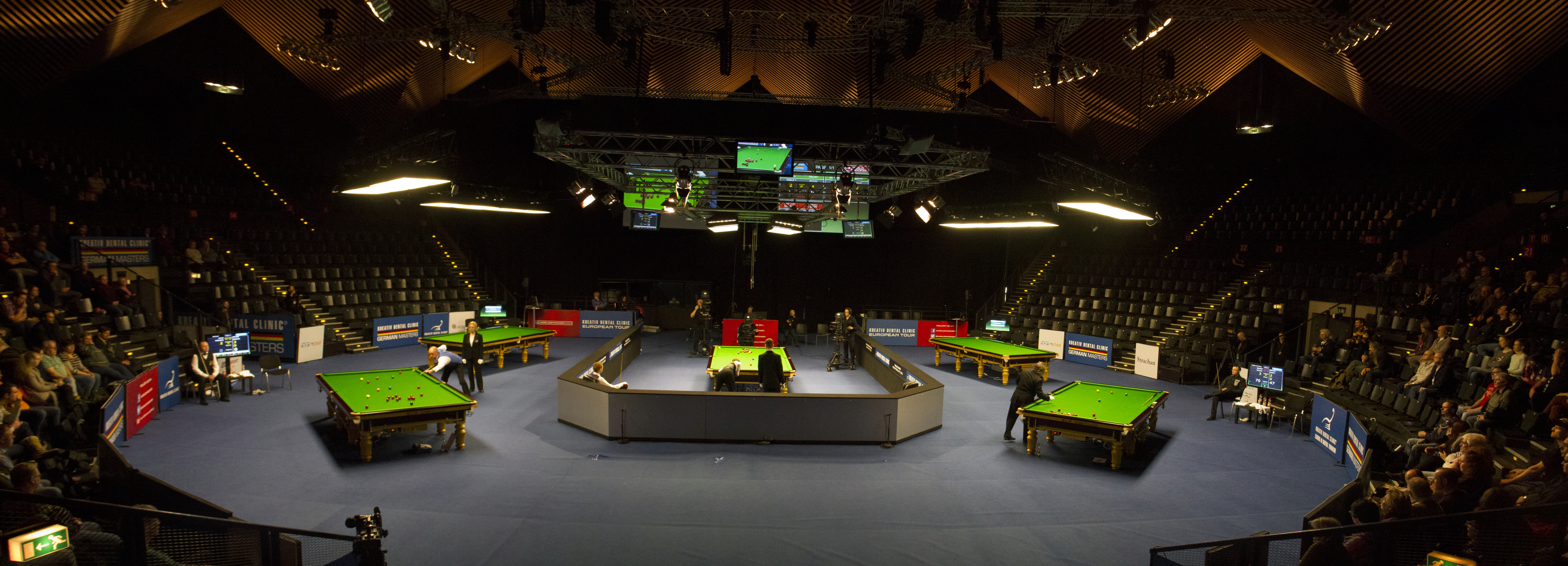
Panoramic view from the main arena with 5 tables, two less than in 2014

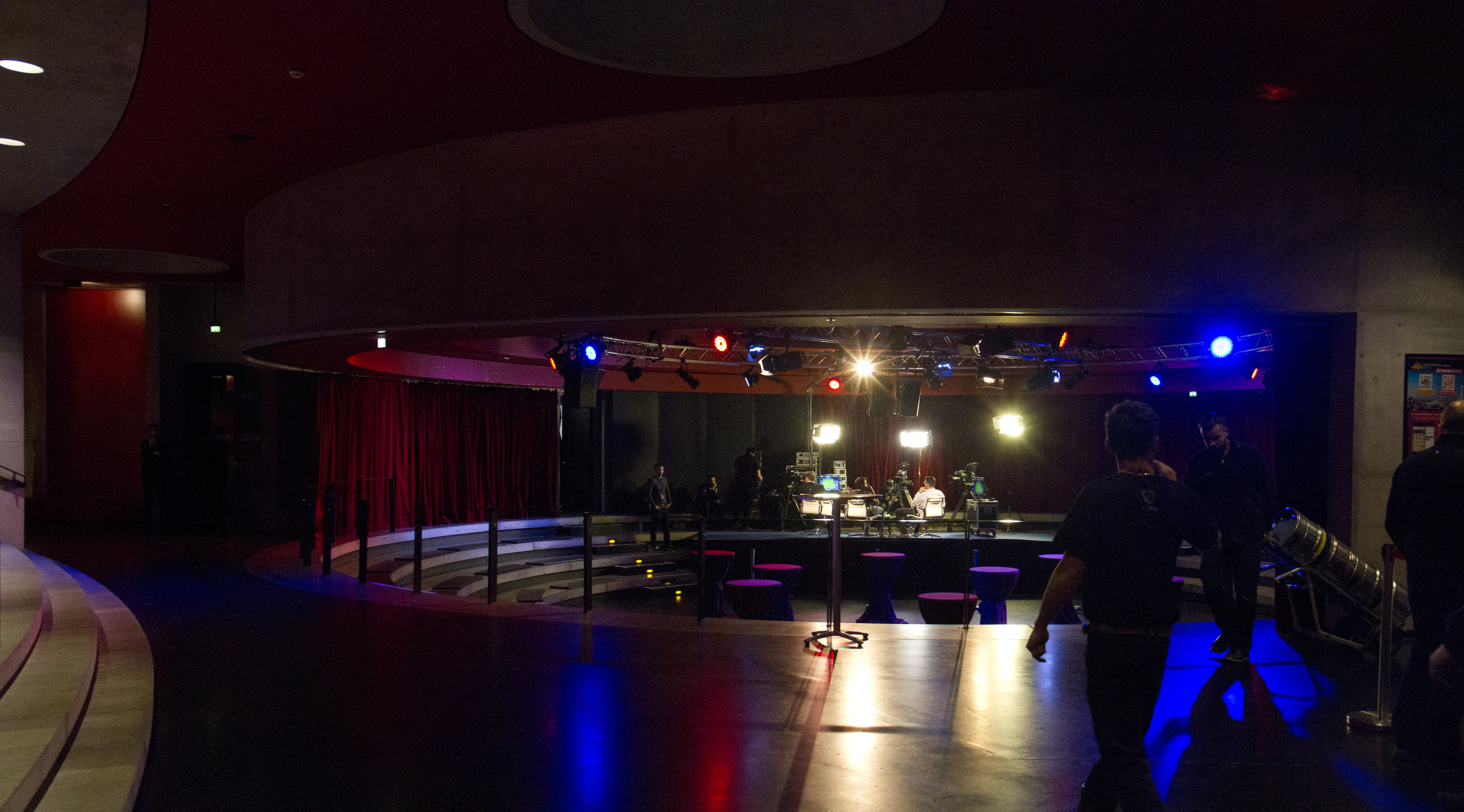
Little Arena, used as TV-Studio for Eurosport-UK

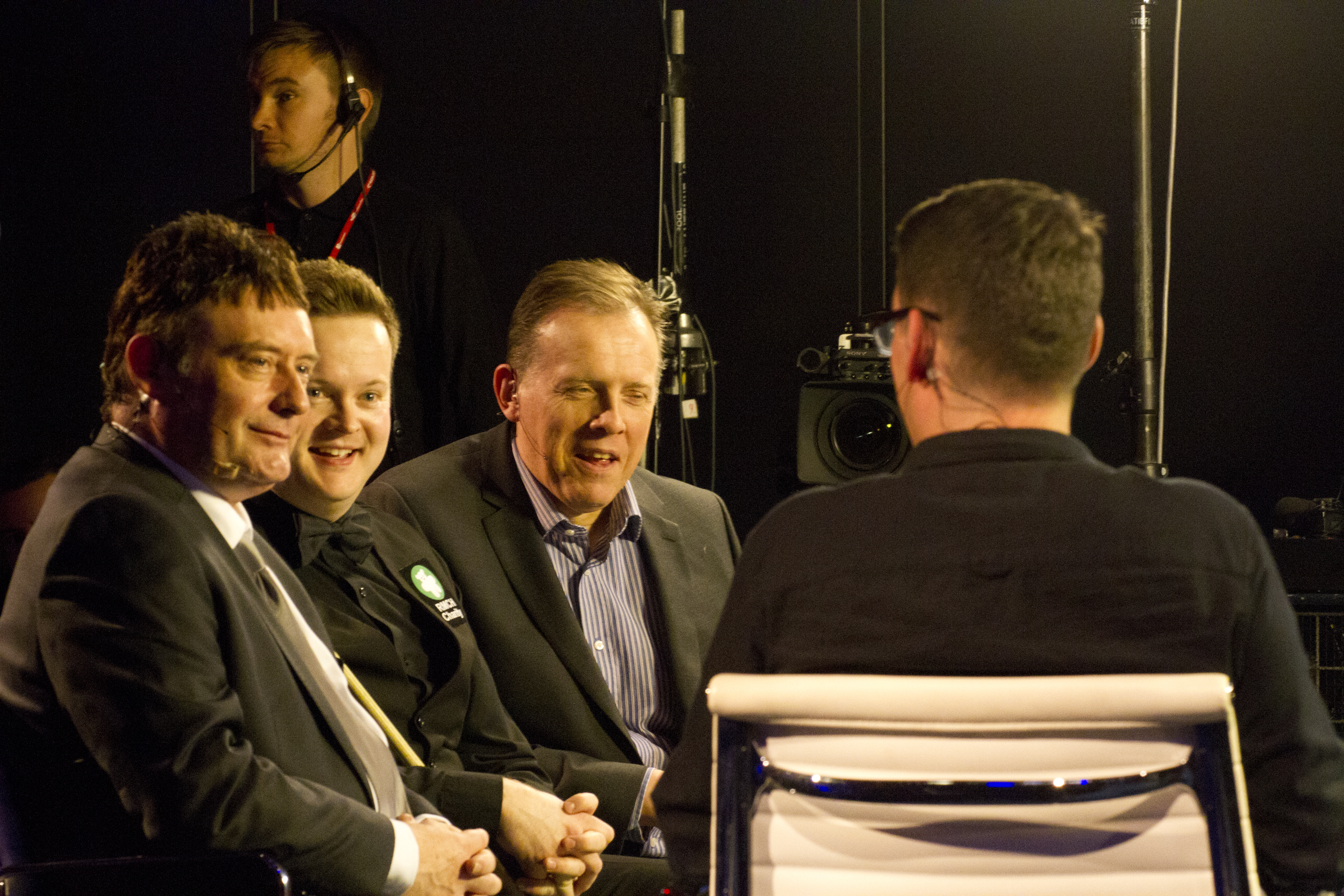
Eurosport commentators Neal Foulds and Jimmy White in an interview with Shaun Murphy

Last 32; Best of 9 frames
Ding Junhui (CHN)	4
Ryan Day (WAL)	5
Michael Georgiou (ENG)	3
Alfie Burden (ENG)	5
Li Hang (CHN)	1
Liang Wenbo (CHN)	5
Matthew Selt (ENG)	3
Stuart Bingham (ENG)	5
Mark Allen (NIR)	5
Mark Williams (WAL)	2
Michael Wasley (ENG)	1
Shaun Murphy (ENG)	5
Joe Perry (ENG)	5
Jimmy Robertson (ENG)	0
Mark Davis (ENG)	1
Ronnie O'Sullivan (ENG)	5
Neil Robertson (AUS)	5
Fergal O'Brien (IRL)	0
Xiao Guodong (CHN)	5
Liam Highfield (ENG)	4
Stephen Maguire (SCO)	5
David Gilbert (ENG)	3
Mark King (ENG)	5
Barry Hawkins (ENG)	3
Judd Trump (ENG)	5
Michael Holt (ENG)	0
Martin Gould (ENG)	5
Ashley Carty (ENG)	3
John Higgins (SCO)	2
Peter Ebdon (ENG)	5
Anthony McGill (SCO)	4
Mark Selby (ENG)	5

Last 16; Best of 9 frames
(Wales) Ryan Day	5
(England) Alfie Burden	2
(China) Liang Wenbo	5
(England) Stuart Bingham	4
(Northern Ireland) Mark Allen	4
(England) Shaun Murphy	5
(England) Joe Perry	0
(England) Ronnie O'Sullivan	5
(Australia) Neil Robertson	5
(China) Xiao Guodong	0
(Scotland) Stephen Maguire	5
(England) Mark King	2
(England) Judd Trump	5
(England) Martin Gould	1
(England) Peter Ebdon	1
(England) Mark Selby	5

Quarter-finals; Best of 9 frames
(Wales) Ryan Day	4
(China) Liang Wenbo	5
(England) Shaun Murphy	5
(England) Ronnie O'Sullivan	4
(Australia) Neil Robertson	4
(Scotland) Stephen Maguire	5
(England) Judd Trump	4
(England) Mark Selby	5

Semi-finals; Best of 11 frames
(China) Liang Wenbo	4
(England) Shaun Murphy	6
(Scotland) Stephen Maguire	2
(England) Mark Selby	6

Final; Best of 17 frames
(England) Shaun Murphy	7
(England) Mark Selby	9

== Final ==
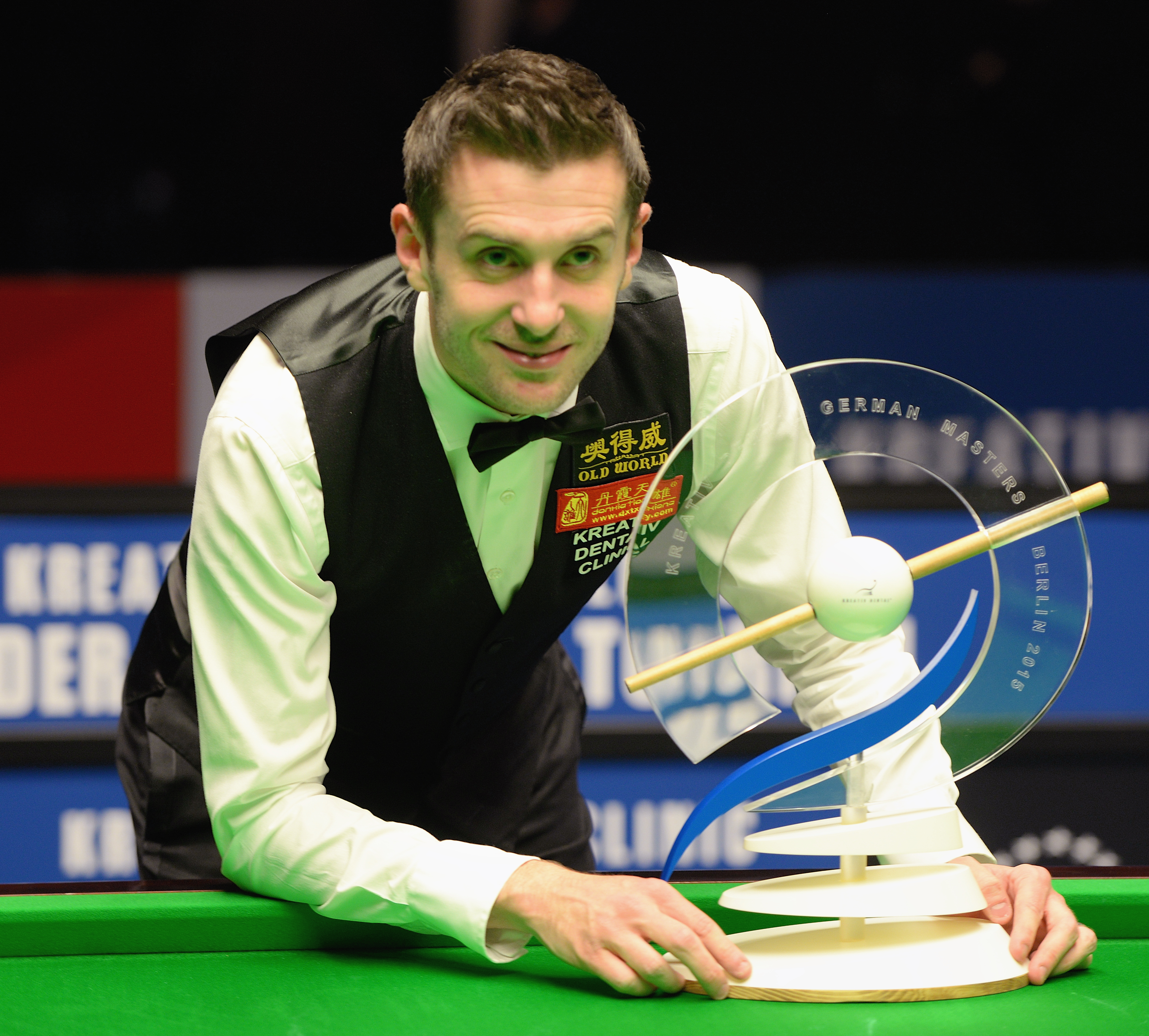
Mark Selby with trophy

Final: Best of 17 frames. Referee: Marcel Eckardt. Tempodrom, Berlin, Germany, 8 February 2015.
Shaun Murphy; England	7–9	Mark Selby; England
Afternoon: 39–71, 88–32 (72), 0–106 (53), 130–0 (130), 119–7 (118), 73–40, 80–0 (51), 62–70 (Selby 62); Evening: 35–92 (92), 47–84 (52), 0–93 (93), 37–72, 80–0 (80), 60–52, 19–79, 4–99 (51)
130	Highest break	93
2	Century breaks	0
5	50+ breaks	6

== Qualifying ==
These matches were held between 17 and 19 December 2014 at the Robin Park Arena, Sports and Tennis Centre in Wigan, England. All matches were best of 9 frames.

=== Round 1 ===
Ding Junhui (CHN)	5–1	Jamie Clarke (WAL)
Peter Lines (ENG)	2–5	Craig Steadman (ENG)
Anthony Hamilton (ENG)	3–5	Sydney Wilson (ENG)
Ryan Day (WAL)	5–2	Dave Harold (ENG)
Graeme Dott (SCO)	1–5	Michael Georgiou (ENG)
Tom Ford (ENG)	2–5	Andrew Pagett (WAL)
Alfie Burden (ENG)	5–3	David Grace (ENG)
Ali Carter (ENG)	4–5	Sam Baird (ENG)
Ricky Walden (ENG)	4–5	Li Hang (CHN)
Gerard Greene (NIR)	5–2	Ratchayothin Yotharuck (THA)
Dechawat Poomjaeng (THA)	2–5	Stuart Carrington (ENG)
Liang Wenbo (CHN)	5–4	Ian Glover (ENG)
Alan McManus (SCO)	5–4	Zak Surety (ENG)
Matthew Selt (ENG)	5–4	Lu Chenwei (CHN)
Kurt Maflin (NOR)	3–5	Igor Figueiredo (BRA)
Stuart Bingham (ENG)	5–1	Zhou Yuelong (CHN)
Mark Allen (NIR)	5–3	Robin Hull (FIN)
Ben Woollaston (ENG)	5–2	Alex Davies (ENG)
Yu Delu (CHN)	5–1	Lee Walker (WAL)
Mark Williams (WAL)	5–4	Luca Brecel (BEL)
Dominic Dale (WAL)	1–5	Lu Ning (CHN)
Mike Dunn (ENG)	w/d–w/o	Michael Wasley (ENG)
Robbie Williams (ENG)	5–0	Matthew Day (ENG)
Shaun Murphy (ENG)	5–1	Joe O'Connor (ENG)
Joe Perry (ENG)	5–1	Scott Donaldson (SCO)
Cao Yupeng (CHN)	4–5	Fraser Patrick (SCO)
Jimmy Robertson (ENG)	5–4	Hammad Miah (ENG)
Matthew Stevens (WAL)	3–5	Ian Burns (ENG)
Mark Davis (ENG)	5–4	Daniel Wells (WAL)
Gary Wilson (ENG)	5–2	Michael Leslie (SCO)
Aditya Mehta (IND)	5–3	Adam Duffy (ENG)
Ronnie O'Sullivan (ENG)	5–2	George Pragnall (ENG)

Neil Robertson (AUS)	5–4	Mitchell Mann (ENG)
Jamie Jones (WAL)	5–3	Joe Swail (NIR)
Jimmy White (ENG)	3–5	Tian Pengfei (CHN)
Fergal O'Brien (IRL)	5–1	Lyu Haotian (CHN)
Xiao Guodong (CHN)	5–0	Cao Xinlong (CHN)
Nigel Bond (ENG)	2–5	Tony Drago (MLT)
Rory McLeod (ENG)	2–5	Liam Highfield (ENG)
Marco Fu (HKG)	5–1	Steve Davis (ENG)
Stephen Maguire (SCO)	5–1	Alexander Ursenbacher (SWI)
David Morris (IRL)	5–1	Duane Jones (WAL)
Rod Lawler (ENG)	5–2	Allan Taylor (ENG)
David Gilbert (ENG)	5–2	Joel Walker (ENG)
Michael White (WAL)	5–1	Chris Norbury (ENG)
Mark King (ENG)	5–3	Steven Hallworth (ENG)
Jamie Burnett (SCO)	w/d–w/o	Barry Pinches (ENG)
Barry Hawkins (ENG)	5–0	Noppon Saengkham (THA)
Judd Trump (ENG)	5–0	Thanawat Thirapongpaiboon (THA)
Mark Joyce (ENG)	w/o–w/d	Jak Jones (WAL)
Kyren Wilson (ENG)	4–5	Zhang Anda (CHN)
Michael Holt (ENG)	5–3	Eden Sharav (SCO)
Martin Gould (ENG)	5–3	Chris Melling (ENG)
Jamie Cope (ENG)	2–5	Ross Muir (SCO)
Andrew Higginson (ENG)	4–5	James Cahill (ENG)
Robert Milkins (ENG)	2–5	Ashley Carty (ENG)
John Higgins (SCO)	5–2	Elliot Slessor (ENG)
Ken Doherty (IRL)	5–3	Vinnie Calabrese (AUS)
Marcus Campbell (SCO)	5–0	Michael Tomlinson (ENG)
Peter Ebdon (ENG)	5–2	Chris Wakelin (ENG)
Anthony McGill (SCO)	5–3	John Astley (ENG)
Thepchaiya Un-Nooh (THA)	2–5	Sean O'Sullivan (ENG)
Jack Lisowski (ENG)	1–5	Oliver Lines (ENG)
Mark Selby (ENG)	5–3	Oliver Brown (ENG)

=== Round 2 ===
(China) Ding Junhui	5–1	(England) Craig Steadman
(England) Sydney Wilson	3–5	(Wales) Ryan Day
(England) Michael Georgiou	5–3	(Wales) Andrew Pagett
(England) Alfie Burden	5–4	(England) Sam Baird
(China) Li Hang	5–0	(Northern Ireland) Gerard Greene
(England) Stuart Carrington	3–5	(China) Liang Wenbo
(Scotland) Alan McManus	4–5	(England) Matthew Selt
(Brazil) Igor Figueiredo	1–5	(England) Stuart Bingham
(Northern Ireland) Mark Allen	5–3	(England) Ben Woollaston
(China) Yu Delu	1–5	(Wales) Mark Williams
(China) Lu Ning	1–5	(England) Michael Wasley
(England) Robbie Williams	3–5	(England) Shaun Murphy
(England) Joe Perry	5–4	(Scotland) Fraser Patrick
(England) Jimmy Robertson	5–4	(England) Ian Burns
(England) Mark Davis	5–3	(England) Gary Wilson
(India) Aditya Mehta	2–5	(England) Ronnie O'Sullivan

(Australia) Neil Robertson	5–2	(Wales) Jamie Jones
(China) Tian Pengfei	2–5	(Republic of Ireland) Fergal O'Brien
(China) Xiao Guodong	5–0	(Malta) Tony Drago
(England) Liam Highfield	5–2	(Hong Kong) Marco Fu
(Scotland) Stephen Maguire	5–4	(Republic of Ireland) David Morris
(England) Rod Lawler	2–5	(England) David Gilbert
(Wales) Michael White	3–5	(England) Mark King
(England) Barry Pinches	4–5	(England) Barry Hawkins
(England) Judd Trump	5–4	(England) Mark Joyce
(China) Zhang Anda	1–5	(England) Michael Holt
(England) Martin Gould	5–1	(Scotland) Ross Muir
(England) James Cahill	2–5	(England) Ashley Carty
(Scotland) John Higgins	5–2	(Republic of Ireland) Ken Doherty
(Scotland) Marcus Campbell	2–5	(England) Peter Ebdon
(Scotland) Anthony McGill	5–3	(England) Sean O'Sullivan
(England) Oliver Lines	2–5	(England) Mark Selby

== Century breaks ==
=== Qualifying stage centuries ===
- 142, 116 – Shaun Murphy
- 141, 101 – Aditya Mehta
- 136, 131 – Ding Junhui
- 136 – Daniel Wells
- 136 – Ian Burns
- 135, 134, 105, 101 – Neil Robertson
- 135 – Ali Carter
- 133 – Zak Surety
- 132 – Mark Davis
- 131, 121 – Michael Wasley
- 127 – Mark Allen
- 121 – Adam Duffy
- 120, 114, 105 – Judd Trump
- 117, 106, 104 – Ronnie O'Sullivan
- 117 – Robin Hull
- 117 – Ryan Day
- 115, 103 – Li Hang
- 115 – Matthew Stevens
- 115 – Michael White
- 113 – Xiao Guodong
- 112 – David Gilbert
- 109 – Sam Baird
- 107 – Mitchell Mann
- 105 – Alfie Burden
- 104 – Michael Leslie
- 104 – Michael Holt
- 103 – Yu Delu
- 103 – Oliver Lines
- 102 – Jack Lisowski
- 100 – Jimmy Robertson

=== Televised stage centuries ===
- 147, 104, 102 – Judd Trump
- 145, 141, 130, 118 – Shaun Murphy
- 134, 134, 117 – Ronnie O'Sullivan
- 133 – Peter Ebdon
- 132 – Ryan Day
- 126 – Mark Selby
- 119, 107 – Stephen Maguire
- 112 – Alfie Burden
- 111 – Neil Robertson
- 110 – Mark Davis
- 106, 103 – Liang Wenbo
- 106 – Mark King
- 103 – Matthew Selt
- 100 – Mark Allen
