= 2013 EBSA European Under-21 Snooker Championship =

EBSA European Under-21 Snooker Championships
Tournament information
- Dates: 18–22 March 2013
- City: Bor
- Country: Serbia
- Organisation: EBSA

Final
- Champion: (England) James Cahill
- Runner-up: (England) Ashley Carty
- Score: 6–0

The 2013 EBSA European Under-21 Snooker Championships was an amateur snooker tournament held in Bor Serbia from 18 March to 22 March 2013. It was the 17th edition of the EBSA European Under-21 Snooker Championships and it also doubles as a qualification event for the World Snooker Tour.

The tournament was won by 14th seed James Cahill who defeated fellow Englishman Ashley Carty with 6–0 score in the final. This resulted being the only whitewashplayer to win the final by a in the tournaments history. As a result, Cahill was given a two-year card on the professional World Snooker Tour for the 2013/2014 and 2014/2015 seasons.

== Results ==
=== Round 1 ===
Best of 7 frames

33	(Bulgaria) Georgi Velichkov	4–3	32	(Germany) Felix Frede
17	(Scotland) Lee Mein	4–2	48	(France) Nathanaël Beckrich
41	(Belgium) David Corens	3–4	24	(Germany) Lukas Kleckers
25	(Austria) Andreas Ploner	4–2	40	(Austria) Markus Pfistermüller
37	(Romania) Marco Mucci	0–4	28	(Germany) Sascha Breuer
21	(Republic of Ireland) Josh Boileau	4–0	44	(France) Alexis Callewaert
45	(Finland) Heikki Niva	4–1	20	(Finland) Olli-Pekka Virho
29	(Ukraine) Vladyslav Vyshnevskyy	4–1	36	(Romania) Vladu Mihai

35	(Lithuania) Vilius Schulte	4–1	30	(Bulgaria) Ivailo Pekov
19	(Scotland) Joseph McLaren	4–3	46	(Belgium) Jeff Jacobs
43	(Romania) Mario Amza	0–4	22	(Malta) Brian Cini
27	(Poland) Kacper Filipiak	4–2	38	(Israel) Maor Shalom
39	(Republic of Ireland) Andy McCloskey	1–4	26	(Isle of Man) Darryl Hill
23	(Republic of Ireland) Jason Devaney	4–1	42	(Slovakia) Jakub Koniar
47	(Wales) Sam Thomas	4–0	18	(Germany) Robin Otto
31	(Republic of Ireland) Andrew Doherty	4–0	34	(Finland) Jesse Huttunen

Round 2 Best of 7 frames
1	(Wales) Duane Jones	4
33	(Bulgaria) Georgi Velichkov	0
17	(Scotland) Lee Mein	4
16	(Belarus) Siarhei Melnichonak	1
9	(Scotland) Dylan Craig	3
24	(Germany) Lukas Kleckers	4
25	(Austria) Andreas Ploner	1
8	(Wales) Jamie Clarke	4
5	(Switzerland) Alexander Ursenbacher	4
28	(Germany) Sascha Breuer	2
21	(Republic of Ireland) Josh Boileau	1
12	(Scotland) Rhys Clark	4
13	(Israel) Shachar Ruberg	4
45	(Finland) Heikki Niva	1
29	(Ukraine) Vladyslav Vyshnevskyy	0
4	(England) Ashley Carty	4
3	(Scotland) Ross Muir	4
35	(Lithuania) Vilius Schulte	3
19	(Scotland) Joseph McLaren	3
14	(England) James Cahill	4
11	(England) Elliot Slessor	4
22	(Malta) Brian Cini	0
27	(Poland) Kacper Filipiak	2
6	(Poland) Adam Stefanów	4
7	(Wales) Edward Topham	1
26	(Isle of Man) Darryl Hill	4
23	(Republic of Ireland) Jason Devaney	0
10	(England) Shane Castle	4
15	(Northern Ireland) Declan Brennan	4
47	(Wales) Sam Thomas	1
31	(Republic of Ireland) Andrew Doherty	0
2	(Republic of Ireland) Ryan Cronin	4

Round 3 Best of 7 frames
1	(Wales) Duane Jones	4
17	(Scotland) Lee Mein	3
24	(Germany) Lukas Kleckers	4
8	(Wales) Jamie Clarke	3
5	(Switzerland) Alexander Ursenbacher	4
12	(Scotland) Rhys Clark	0
13	(Israel) Shachar Ruberg	3
4	(England) Ashley Carty	4
3	(Scotland) Ross Muir	3
14	(England) James Cahill	4
11	(England) Elliot Slessor	4
6	(Poland) Adam Stefanów	0
26	(Isle of Man) Darryl Hill	4
10	(England) Shane Castle	1
15	(Northern Ireland) Declan Brennan	1
2	(Republic of Ireland) Ryan Cronin	4

Quarter-Finals; Best of 9 frames
1	(Wales) Duane Jones	4
24	(Germany) Lukas Kleckers	3
12	(Switzerland) Alexander Ursenbacher	3
4	(England) Ashley Carty	4
14	(England) James Cahill	4
11	(England) Elliot Slessor	1
26	(Isle of Man) Darryl Hill	4
2	(Republic of Ireland) Ryan Cronin	3

Semi-Finals; Best of 9 frames
1	(Wales) Duane Jones	2
4	(England) Ashley Carty	5
14	(England) James Cahill	5
26	(Isle of Man) Darryl Hill	1

Final; Best of 11 frames
4	(England) Ashley Carty	0
14	(England) James Cahill	6
