= Ashley Carty =

English snooker player

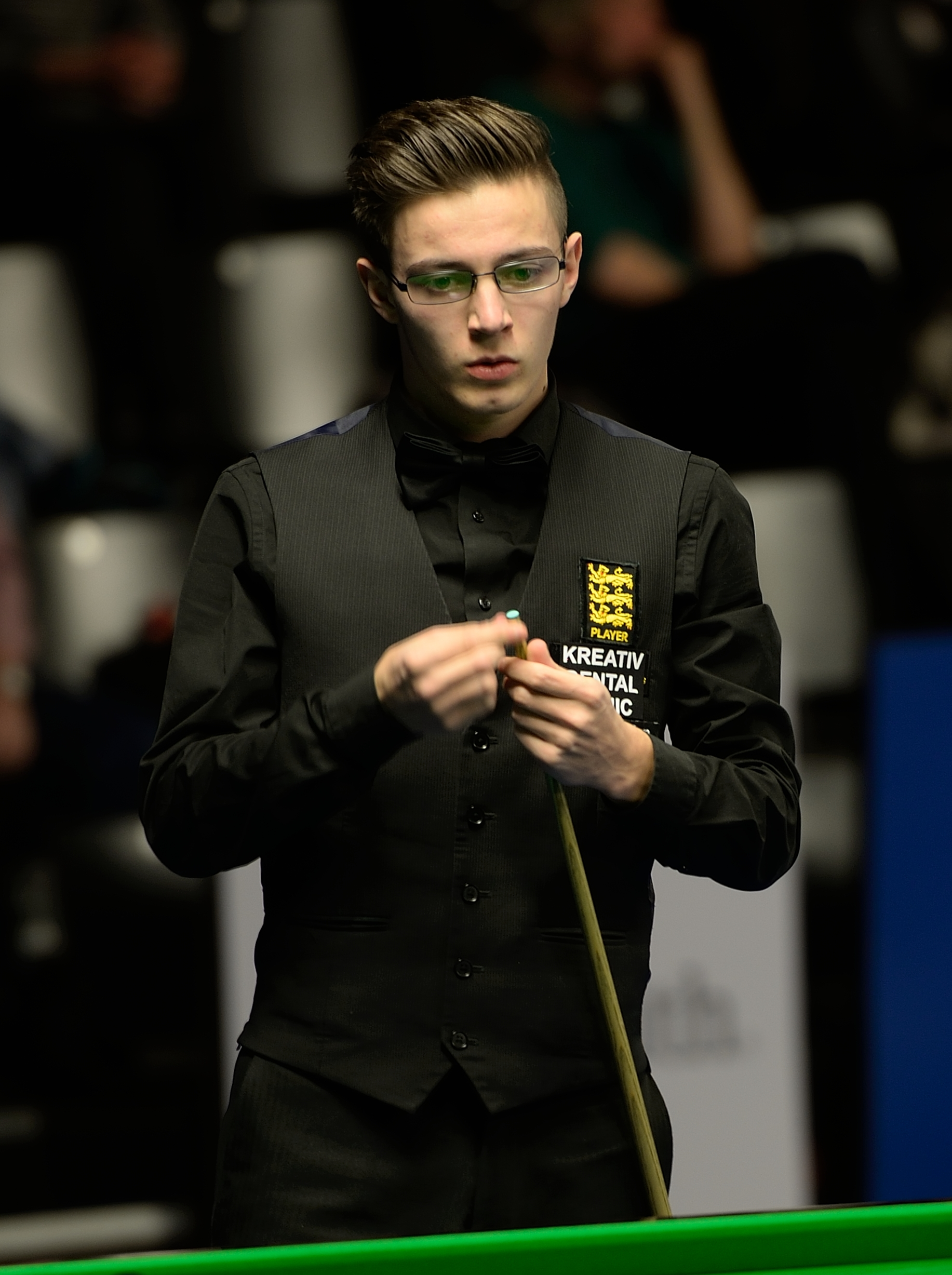
- German Masters 2015

Personal information
- Born: 17 July 1995 (age 31) Rotherham, England

Sport
- Country: England
- Sport: Snooker
- Professional: 2018–2022, 2023–2025, 2026–present
- Highest ranking: 67 (July 2024)
- Current ranking: 92 (as of 7 November 2026)
- Best ranking finish: Quarter-final (2023 European Masters)

Ashley Carty (born 17 July 1995) is an English professional snooker player.

== Career ==
At age 17, he reached the final of the 2013 EBSA European Under-21 Snooker Championship, losing 0–6 to James Cahill. He won the 2014 English Under-21 Championship, defeating Joe O’Connor 8–3 in the final. The following year, competing as an amateur, he reached the last 32 of both the 2015 German Masters and the 2015 Welsh Open.

At the third event of the 2018 Q School he earned a two-year professional tour card for the 2018–19 and 2019–20 seasons. He achieved his first significant professional success when he defeated Ken Doherty and Neil Robertson in televised matches at the 2020 Championship League, topping his group. At the 2020 World Snooker Championship, he defeated Ross Muir, Jimmy Robertson, and Robert Milkins in the qualifiers to reach the main stage of the event for the first time, but his Crucible debut ended with a 7–10 first-round defeat to Stuart Bingham. He was ranked 77th in the world at the end of the 2019–20 season, outside the top-64 cutoff point, but reaching the main stage of the World Championship secured him a two-year tour card for the 2020–21 and 2021–22 seasons.

Carty finished the 2021–22 season ranked 75th in the world, and was relegated from the professional tour. Carty stated that his father had been in hospital for almost five months with COVID-19 during the 2021–22 season, and he did not practice for much of that time. However, he won the 2022/23 WPBSA Q Tour Playoff in March 2023, beating Florian Nüßle 5–2 in the final, which earned him a new two-year tour card for the 2023–24 and 2024–25 seasons. At the 2023 European Masters, he defeated Thepchaiya Un-Nooh 5–1 in the last 32 and Ricky Walden 5–3 in the last 16 to reach the first ranking quarter-final of his career, where he lost 1–5 to Judd Trump.

== Personal life ==
Carty lives in Thurcroft, Rotherham, with his girlfriend Chloe.

== Performance and rankings timeline ==
Tournament	2011/ 12	2012/ 13	2013/ 14	2014/ 15	2015/ 16	2016/ 17	2017/ 18	2018/ 19	2019/ 20	2020/ 21	2021/ 22	2023/ 24	2024/ 25	2025/ 26	2026/ 27
Ranking (Note: It shows the ranking at the beginning of the season)	(Note: He was an amateur)							(Note: New players on the Main Tour don't have a ranking)	81	(Note: Players who qualified via a World Championship Wildcard start without ranking points)	70		69		
Ranking tournaments
Championship League	Non-Ranking Event									RR	RR	2R	2R	RR	RR
China Open	A	A	A	1R	A	A	A	1R	Tournament Not Held						LQ
Wuhan Open	Tournament Not Held											2R	LQ	A	LQ
British Open	Tournament Not Held										1R	2R	2R	1R	1R
English Open	Tournament Not Held					A	A	1R	1R	1R	1R	LQ	LQ	A	2R
Shenzhen Open (Note: The event was called the Xi'an Grand Prix (2024/2025–2025/2026))	Tournament Not Held												LQ	A	LQ
Northern Ireland Open	Tournament Not Held					A	A	1R	1R	2R	2R	LQ	LQ	A	LQ
International Championship	NH	A	A	LQ	A	A	A	LQ	1R	Not Held		LQ	LQ	A	1R
UK Championship	A	A	A	1R	A	A	A	1R	1R	2R	1R	LQ	LQ	A	LQ
Shoot Out	Non-Ranking Event					A	1R	1R	3R	2R	1R	2R	3R	1R	
Scottish Open	NH	MR	Not Held			A	A	2R	1R	2R	LQ	2R	LQ	A	LQ
German Masters	A	A	A	1R	A	A	A	LQ	LQ	LQ	LQ	1R	LQ	A	LQ
Welsh Open	A	A	A	3R	A	A	A	1R	2R	1R	1R	LQ	LQ	A	
World Grand Prix	Not Held			NR	DNQ	DNQ	DNQ	DNQ	DNQ	DNQ	DNQ	DNQ	DNQ	DNQ	
Players Championship (Note: The event was called the Players Tour Championship Grand Final (2011/2012–2015/2016))	DNQ	DNQ	DNQ	DNQ	DNQ	DNQ	DNQ	DNQ	DNQ	DNQ	DNQ	DNQ	DNQ	DNQ	
World Open	A	A	LQ	Not Held		A	A	LQ	LQ	Not Held		LQ	LQ	A	
Tour Championship	Tournament Not Held							DNQ	DNQ	DNQ	DNQ	DNQ	DNQ	DNQ	
World Championship	A	A	A	LQ	A	A	A	LQ	1R	LQ	LQ	LQ	LQ	LQ	
Non-ranking tournaments
Championship League	A	A	A	A	A	A	A	A	2R	A	A	A	A	A	
Former ranking tournaments
Wuxi Classic	NR	A	LQ	LQ	Tournament Not Held										
Australian Goldfields Open	A	A	LQ	LQ	LQ	Tournament Not Held									
Shanghai Masters	A	A	A	LQ	A	A	A	Non-Ranking		Not Held		Non-Ranking Event			
Paul Hunter Classic	Minor-Ranking Event					A	1R	1R	NR	Tournament Not Held					
Indian Open	Not Held		LQ	LQ	NH	A	A	1R	Tournament Not Held						
Riga Masters (Note: The event was called the Riga Open (2014/2015–2015/2016))	Not Held			Minor-Rank		A	1R	2R	LQ	Tournament Not Held					
China Championship	Tournament Not Held					NR	A	1R	LQ	Tournament Not Held					
WST Pro Series	Tournament Not Held									RR	Tournament Not Held				
Turkish Masters	Tournament Not Held										LQ	Tournament Not Held			
Gibraltar Open	Tournament Not Held				MR	1R	LQ	2R	1R	1R	1R	Tournament Not Held			
European Masters	Tournament Not Held					A	A	LQ	LQ	3R	2R	QF	Not Held		
Saudi Arabia Masters	Tournament Not Held												4R	A	NH

Performance Table Legend
LQ	lost in the qualifying draw	#R	lost in the early rounds of the tournament (WR = Wildcard round, RR = Round robin)	QF	lost in the quarter-finals
SF	lost in the semi-finals	F	lost in the final	W	won the tournament
DNQ	did not qualify for the tournament	A	did not participate in the tournament	WD	withdrew from the tournament

NH / Not Held	means an event was not held.
NR / Non-Ranking Event	means an event is/was no longer a ranking event.
R / Ranking Event	means an event is/was a ranking event.
MR / Minor-Ranking Event	means an event is/was a minor-ranking event.

== Career finals ==
=== Amateur finals: 3 (2 titles) ===
Outcome	No.	Year	Championship	Opponent in the final	Score
Runner-up	1.	2013	European Under-21 Snooker Championship	(England) James Cahill	0–6
Winner	1.	2023	English 6-Red Championship	(England) Shaun Wilkes	7–5
Winner	2.	2023	Q Tour – Playoff	(Austria) Florian Nüßle	5–2
