= James Cahill (snooker player) =

British snooker player (born 1995)

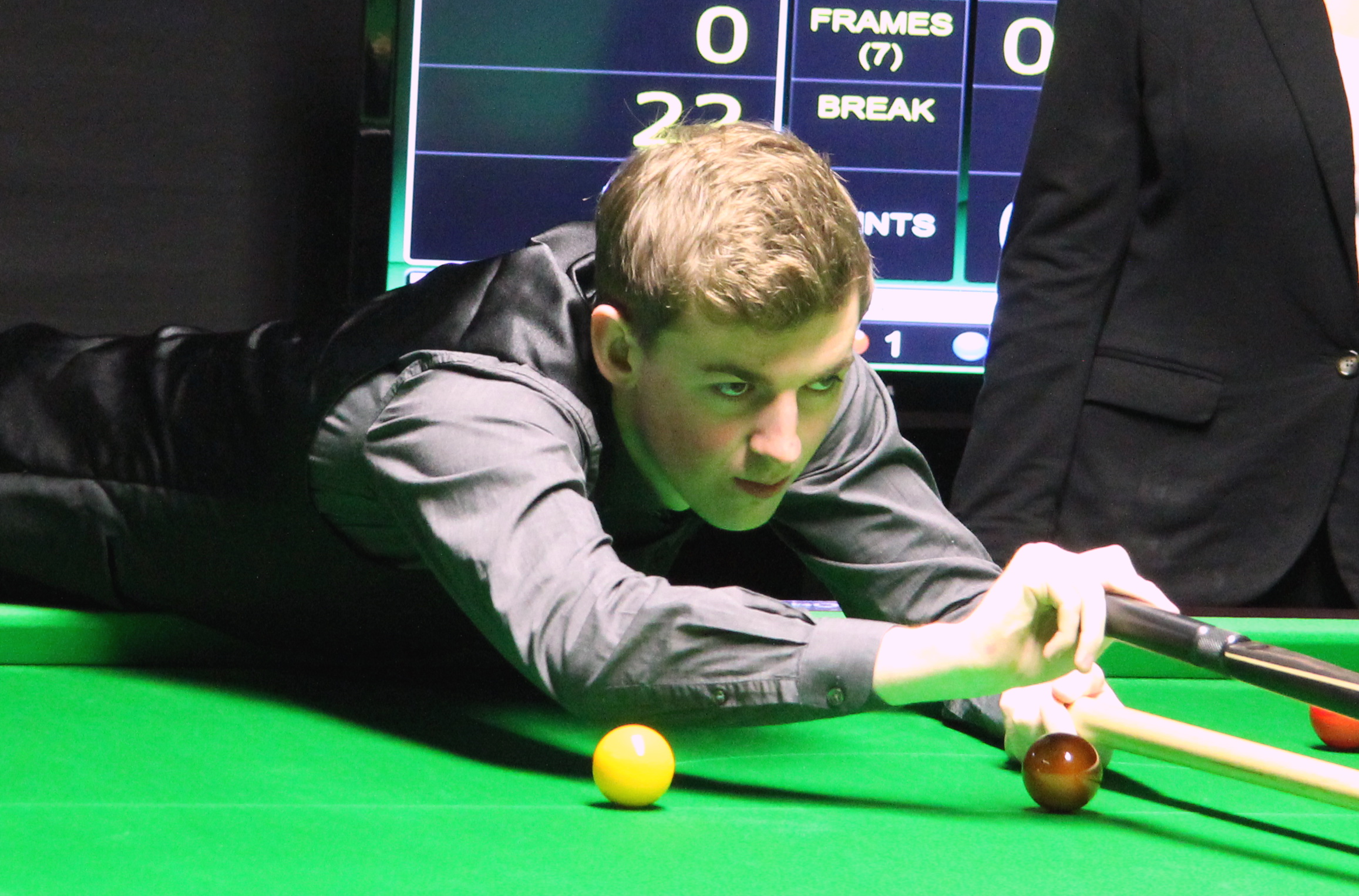
- Cahill at the 2016 Paul Hunter Classic

Personal information
- Nickname: The Giant-killer
- Born: 27 December 1995 (age 30) Blackpool, England

Sport
- Country: England
- Sport: Snooker
- Professional: 2013–2017, 2019–2021, 2022–2024
- Highest ranking: 66 (July 2023)
- Best ranking finish: Last 16 (x3)

James Cahill (born 27 December 1995) is an English former professional snooker player from Blackpool. Cahill first turned professional in 2013, aged 17, after winning the European Under 21 Championships, but returned to amateur status in 2017.

As an amateur, Cahill reached the main stage of the 2019 World Snooker Championship, becoming the first amateur player ever to qualify for the event. At the tournament, he defeated world number one Ronnie O'Sullivan 10–8 in their first round match. O'Sullivan was the second former world number one Cahill had defeated in the 2018–19 snooker season, after his victory over Mark Selby at the 2018 UK Championship. Cahill qualified for a new two-year tour card as the second highest ranked player on the one year list who was not in the top 64 in the world after the 2018–19 season. He rejoined the professional tour in June 2019, only to be relegated again in June 2021, and rejoin June 2022.

== Career ==
Cahill was born on 27 December 1995 to Maria and Patrick Cahill. Cahill was an amateur player until 2013, when he entered the 2013 EBSA European Under-21 Snooker Championships as the fourteenth seed. At 17, he defeated Joseph McLaren and Ross Muir 4–3, Elliot Slessor 4–1 and Darryl Hill 5–1 in the semi-final to play sixteen year old Ashley Carty in the final. The final, played as a best of 11 frames match, saw Cahill whitewash Carty 6–0 to win the tournament. Having won the event, Cahill gained a two-year tour card for the 2013–14 and 2014–15 snooker seasons, allowing him to play in all professional tournaments.

=== Professional career ===
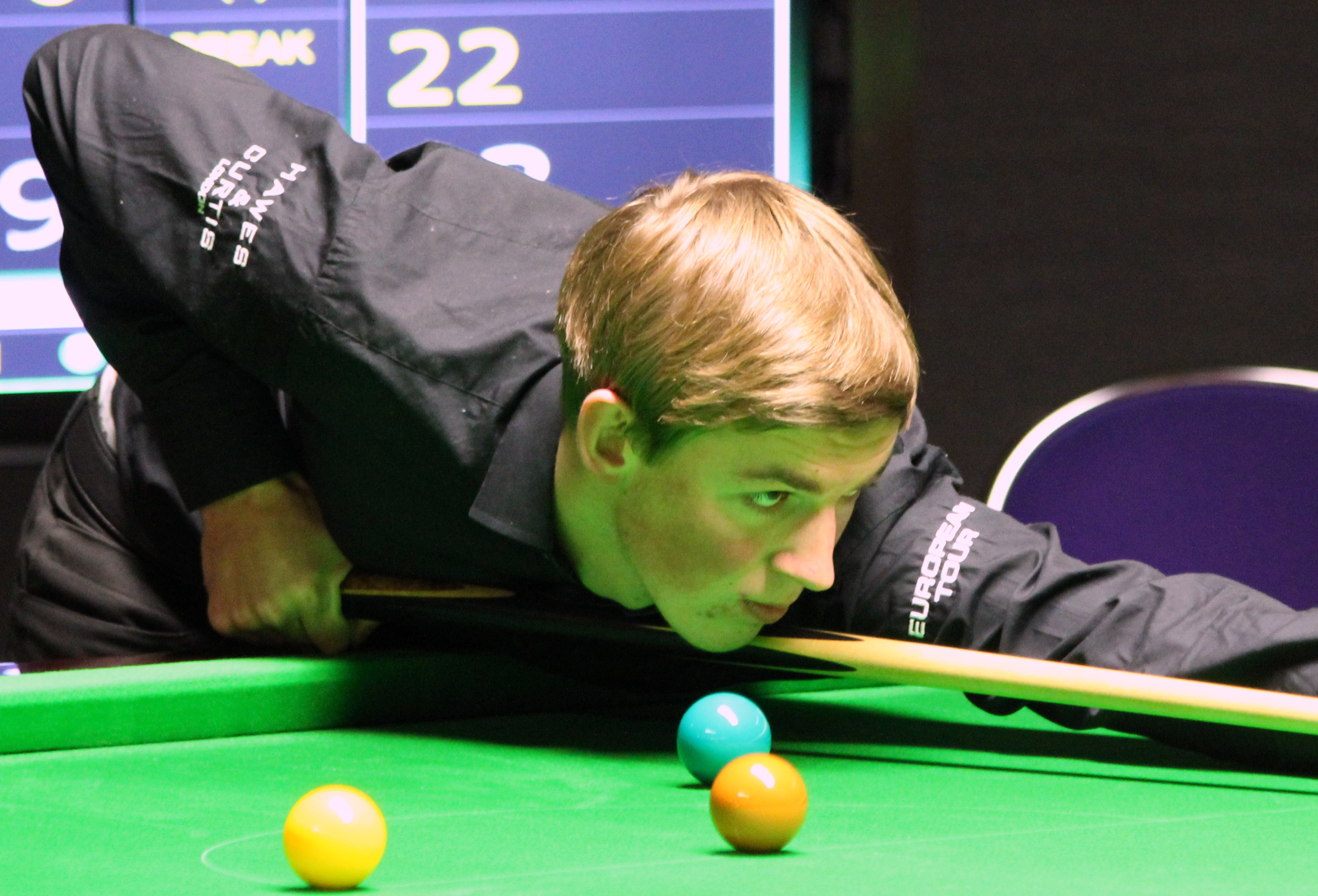
2014 Paul Hunter Classic

Cahill won just three matches during the 2013/2014 season, and ended his debut season on tour ranked world number 117. He played in the main stages in the 2013 UK Championship and the 2013 Welsh Open, but did not progress past the first round in either competition, losing to Joe Perry 6–3, and Ken Doherty 4–0. Cahill's second season saw him improve his results as he twice reached the last 32 in the minor-ranking European Tour events. At 18 years old, he then went on his best run to date in a ranking event during the 2014 UK Championship. He won comfortably in the first round, beating veteran Mark King 6–0 and then saw off former Welsh Open finalist Andrew Higginson 6–4. Cahill faced world number three Ding Junhui, a player who had won five ranking titles the previous season, and raced into a 5–1 lead. Ding won three frames in a row and needed three snookers in the next frame, which he got when Cahill left a free ball. Cahill responded by taking the deciding frame to record the biggest victory of his career up to that point.

In the last 16 of the championships, Cahill commented he couldn't "believe how badly [he] played" after his tournament ended with a 2–6 loss to Mark Davis. Cahill had a poor end to the season as he lost seven out of eight matches after this which would have relegated him from the tour as he finished 85th in the world rankings. However, his performance in the European Tour events saw him finish high enough on the European Order of Merit to retain his spot on the tour for the following two seasons. In the 2015–16 season, Cahill failed to win more than one match at an event, winning just five matches all year. He competed at the main stage of the 2015 UK Championship, where he lost to Anthony McGill 6–3. Appearing at the 2016 Welsh Open, he won his first round match for the first time, defeating Xiao Guodong 4–1, but then lost 1–4 to Mark Davis. Cahill finished the season 110th in the rankings.

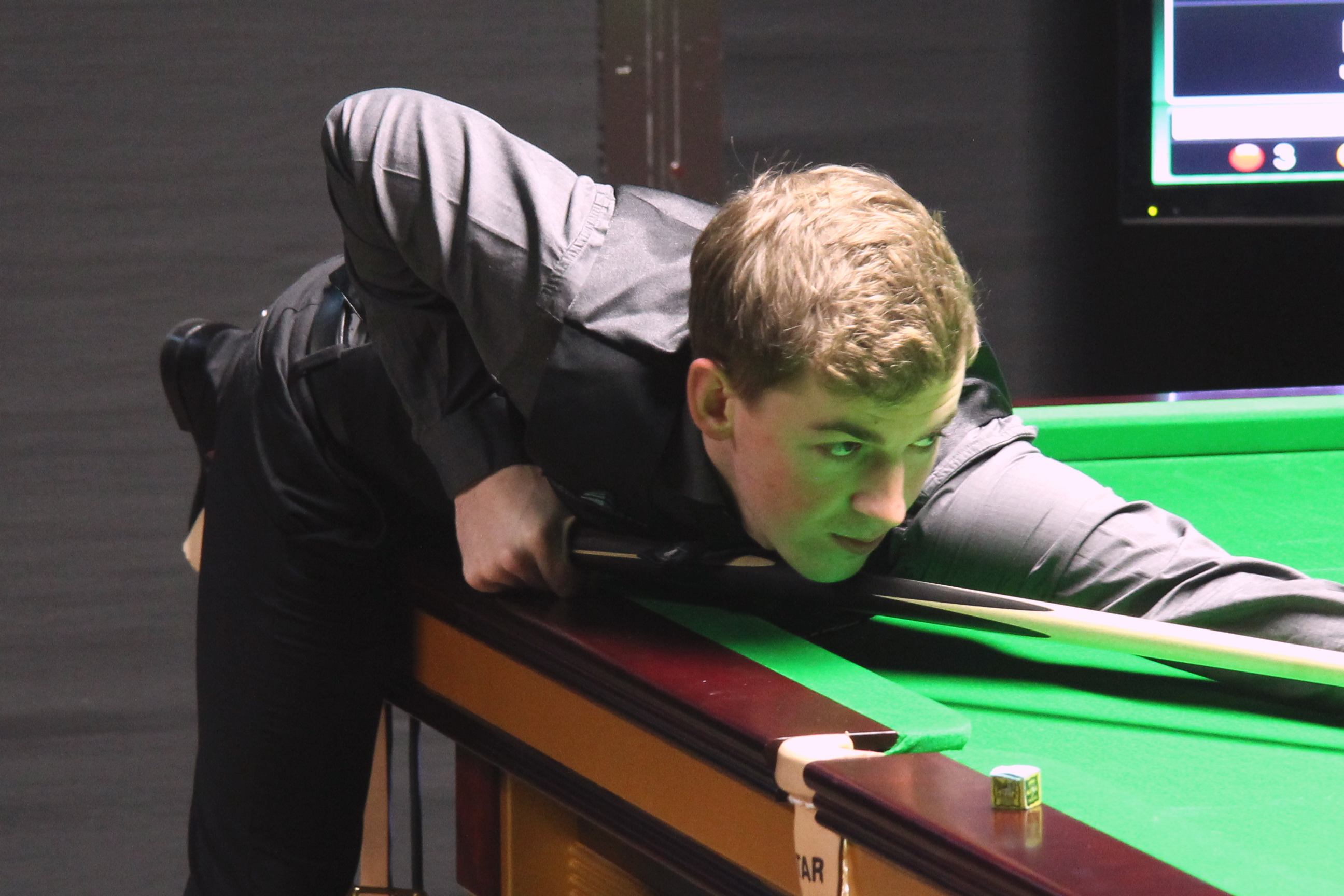
2016 Paul Hunter Classic

Cahill's 2016–17 season was a breakout year, where he appeared in many more main stage tournaments than any of his previous seasons. He appeared for the first time at both the 2016 Riga Masters, losing 3–4 to Zhao Xintong; and then 2016 World Open losing to Liang Wenbo 2–5. Cahill progressed to the third round of the 2016 Paul Hunter Classic by eliminating Kevin Vandevoort 4–0 and Ryan Day 4–2. In the third round, he drew world number one Mark Selby. Despite being 1–3 behind, he made two breaks above 50 to come back to tie the match at 3–3, but lost the deciding frame. The next event of the season saw him beaten 1–4 by Joe Swail in the second round of the English Open, after beating Adam Stefanow 4–3 in the opening round.

Following this, Cahill lost in the first round of five ranking events, including the UK Championship and Welsh Open. He did, however, defeat Robbie Williams and Noppon Saengkham before losing to Ken Doherty in the third round of the non-ranking one-frame Snooker Shoot-Out event. He finished the season losing in the opening round of qualification for the 2017 World Snooker Championship, losing to Robbie Williams 1–10. Having finished the season with a world ranking of 106, Cahill required a successful run in 2017 Q School to remain on the tour. After exiting in the opening round Andres Petrov 2–4 of the first event, he fared better at the second event, defeating Jaspal Bamotra, James Silverwood, Alex Taubman and Ashley Carty but losing 2–4 to Paul Davison to confirm his relegation from the tour.

=== Amateur career and World Snooker Championship ===
Competing as an amateur, Cahill appeared in two professional events, at the 2017 Snooker Shoot Out, where he defeated Rory McLeod before losing to Graeme Dott, and the 2018 Gibraltar Open where he defeated Eden Sharav 4–1, before losing to Noppon Saengkham 1–4. Post-season, Cahill entered 2018 Q School. He reached the fifth round of all three events. At the first event he lost to Jordan Brown 4–1, the second event, to Jamie Cope 3–4, and Kuldesh Johal 3–4 in the final event. Having only reached the fifth round, he did not win a place back on tour for the next season, and returned to being an amateur player.

Cahill played the season as an amateur player, but was allowed into the main stage of events through qualifying. Cahill defeated Liang Wenbo in qualifying to reach the 2018 World Open mainstage, but was defeated 4–5 by Andrew Higginson. At the dedicated Amateur qualifying event for the 2018 Paul Hunter Classic, Cahill defeated Conor Caniff 4–1 and Charlie Walters 4–2 to reach the event. However, Cahill lost in the first round once again to Niu Zhuang. Competing at the 2018 UK Championship as an amateur, Cahill defeated world number one Mark Selby 6–3 in the first round, allowing Selby just 79 points in the first three frames. After the victory, Cahill commented "the standard wasn't amazing. But to beat the world number one, such a great player, is brilliant." He then played Sunny Akani in the second round, losing 5–6.

At the 2019 World Championship, Cahill was given a qualifying wildcard spot by the World Professional Billiards and Snooker Association, despite being an amateur. He played Andrew Higginson in the first round of qualifying, and led 7–0 and 8–2, before Higginson won 7 straight frames to lead 9–8. Cahill won the last two frames of the match to win 10–9 and progress to the second round of qualifying. He then defeated Michael Holt 10–7, to set up a final qualifying round match against fellow amateur player Michael Judge. Cahill defeated Judge 10–6 to become the first amateur player to play at the main stages of the world championships at the Crucible Theatre.

"I can take a lot of confidence from this. I've always felt that I belong on a big stage. When I was losing to guys in back rooms with no crowd, I always felt it would be different if I could get myself up there. A lot of the players haven't got the temperament to go out there and perform. It's not easy to perform. You've either got it or you haven't."

— James Cahill on defeating Ronnie O'Sullivan at the World Championship.

In the first round of the championship, Cahill drew world number one and five-time champion Ronnie O'Sullivan. Cahill led 5–4 after the first session of the match and won three of the four frames at the start of the next session to lead 8–5. O'Sullivan won the following three frames to tie the match at 8–8 before Cahill won the final two frames and the match 10–8. After beating O'Sullivan, Cahill commented "I am over the moon, to beat the best player in the world and hold myself together on my Crucible debut." The match was referred to as the "biggest shock in Crucible history" by the BBC, with master of ceremonies Rob Walker introducing him as "the giant killer" for having defeated two world number ones as an amateur.

Following the victory, Cahill drew world number 15 Stephen Maguire in the last 16, in a best of 25 frames match. Maguire won the first two frames, before Cahill tied the match at 2–2. Maguire won the next three frames to lead 5–2, before Cahill ended the first session 3–5 behind. The pair finished the second session with two frames once again between them, after Cahill won 4 of the next 6 frames to tie the match at 7–7, but Maguire won the final two frames to lead 9–7. Cahill tied the match at 11–11, and looked to lead for the first time at 12–11; however, during his break, Cahill fouled the pink ball with his waistcoat, allowing Maguire to win the frame. Cahill won frame 24, sending the match to a deciding frame. Maguire, however, overcame in the decider.

Due to his performances (as a Q School top-up entrant) in tournaments during the 2018–19 season, Cahill secured a new two-year tour card for the 2019–20 and 2020–21 seasons. He finished second on the one year ranking list of those not in the top 64 in the world rankings. Despite having reached the second round of the world championships, Cahill started the following season with no ranking points, not having achieved the results as a professional player. However, he finished 90th in the world rankings after the 2020–21 season, and returned to being an amateur player in June 2021.

== Personal life ==
Cahill was born in Blackpool, England, to Maria and Patrick Cahill. Both parents are former amateur snooker players, with Maria having been a highly ranked player in the 1980s. The seven-time world champion Stephen Hendry was formerly married to Maria's sister Mandy. Maria runs a snooker club in Preston.

Cahill received a one-year ban from driving after being found to be under the influence whilst driving in Perth, Scotland. During qualification for the 2019 World Snooker Championship, the snooker club run by his family was burgled. Despite money being stolen and items being destroyed, Cahill's cue was left undamaged.

== Performance and rankings timeline ==
Tournament	2013/ 14	2014/ 15	2015/ 16	2016/ 17	2017/ 18	2018/ 19	2019/ 20	2020/ 21	2021/ 22	2022/ 23	2023/ 24	2025/ 26
Ranking (Note: It shows the ranking at the beginning of the season)	(Note: New players on the Main Tour do not have a ranking)	117	(Note: Players qualified through European Tour Order of Merit started the season without prize money ranking points)	110	(Note: He was an amateur)			82		(Note: Players qualified through Q School started the season without ranking points)	71	
Ranking tournaments
Championship League	Non-Ranking Event							RR	RR	RR	2R	RR
Wuhan Open	Tournament Not Held										LQ	
English Open	Not Held			2R	A	1R	1R	1R	WD	LQ	1R	
British Open	Tournament Not Held								1R	LQ	LQ	
Northern Ireland Open	Not Held			1R	A	1R	1R	2R	2R	LQ	1R	
International Championship	LQ	LQ	LQ	LQ	A	A	LQ	Not Held			LQ	
UK Championship	1R	4R	1R	1R	A	2R	2R	1R	A	LQ	LQ	
Shoot Out	Non-Ranking Event			3R	2R	1R	1R	1R	1R	1R	1R	
Scottish Open	Not Held			1R	A	2R	2R	1R	LQ	LQ	1R	
German Masters	LQ	LQ	LQ	LQ	A	LQ	LQ	LQ	A	LQ	LQ	
World Grand Prix	NH	NR	DNQ	DNQ	DNQ	DNQ	DNQ	DNQ	DNQ	DNQ	DNQ	
Welsh Open	1R	1R	2R	1R	A	3R	1R	1R	LQ	LQ	LQ	
Players Championship (Note: The event was called the Players Championship Grand Final (2013/2014–2015/2016))	DNQ	DNQ	DNQ	DNQ	DNQ	DNQ	DNQ	DNQ	DNQ	DNQ	DNQ	
World Open	LQ	Not Held		1R	A	1R	LQ	Not Held			LQ	
Tour Championship	Tournament Not Held					DNQ	DNQ	DNQ	DNQ	DNQ	DNQ	
World Championship	LQ	LQ	LQ	LQ	A	2R	LQ	LQ	LQ	LQ	LQ	
Former ranking tournaments
Wuxi Classic	LQ	LQ	Tournament Not Held									
Australian Goldfields Open	LQ	LQ	LQ	Tournament Not Held								
Shanghai Masters	LQ	LQ	LQ	LQ	A	Non-Ranking		Not Held			Non-Ranking	
Paul Hunter Classic	Minor-Ranking			3R	WD	1R	NR	Tournament Not Held				
Indian Open	LQ	LQ	NH	LQ	A	3R	Tournament Not Held					
China Open	LQ	LQ	LQ	LQ	A	LQ	Tournament Not Held					
Riga Masters (Note: The event was called the Riga Open (2014/2015–2015/2016))	NH	Minor-Ranking		1R	A	LQ	1R	Tournament Not Held				
China Championship	Not Held			NR	A	A	LQ	Tournament Not Held				
WST Pro Series	Tournament Not Held							2R	Tournament Not Held			
Turkish Masters	Tournament Not Held								LQ	Not Held		
Gibraltar Open	Not Held		MR	1R	2R	2R	1R	1R	1R	Not Held		
WST Classic	Tournament Not Held									4R	Not Held	
European Masters	Not Held			LQ	A	LQ	LQ	2R	WD	1R	1R	NH
Former non-ranking tournaments
Six-red World Championship	A	A	A	A	A	A	A	A	A	LQ	Not Held	

Performance Table Legend
LQ	lost in the qualifying draw	#R	lost in the early rounds of the tournament (WR = Wildcard round, RR = Round robin)	QF	lost in the quarter-finals
SF	lost in the semi-finals	F	lost in the final	W	won the tournament
DNQ	did not qualify for the tournament	A	did not participate in the tournament	WD	withdrew from the tournament

NH / Not Held	means an event was not held.
NR / Non-Ranking Event	means an event is/was no longer a ranking event.
R / Ranking Event	means an event is/was a ranking event.
MR / Minor-Ranking Event	means an event is/was a minor-ranking event.

== Career finals ==
=== Amateur finals: 1 (1 title) ===
Outcome	No.	Year	Championship	Opponent in the final	Score	Ref
Winner	1.	2013	EBSA European Under-21 Snooker Championship	(England) Ashley Carty	6–0	
