= 2026 Tour Championship =

Snooker tournament

2026 Sportsbet.io Tour Championship
- Part of the Players Series

Tournament information
- Dates: 30 March – 5 April 2026
- Venue: Manchester Central
- City: Manchester
- Country: England
- Organisation: World Snooker Tour
- Format: Ranking event
- Total prize fund: £500,000
- Winner's share: £150,000
- Highest break: Judd Trump (ENG) (140)

Final
- Champion: Zhao Xintong (CHN)
- Runner-up: Judd Trump (ENG)
- Score: 10–3

The 2026 Tour Championship (officially the 2026 Sportsbet.io Tour Championship) was a professional snooker tournament that took place from 30 March to 5 April 2026 at the Manchester Central in Manchester, England. It featured the top 12 players on the one-year ranking list, as it stood after the 2026 World Open. The eighth consecutive edition of the Tour Championship since it was first staged in 2019, it was the 17th and penultimate ranking event of the 2025–26 snooker season, following the 2026 World Open and preceding the 2026 World Championship. It was the last of three events in the season's Players Series, following the 2026 World Grand Prix and the 2026 Players Championship. The tournament was broadcast by 5 in the United Kingdom, by Eurosport in mainland Europe, by local channels in Asia and Africa, and by WST Play in all other territories. The winner received £150,000 from a total prize fund of £500,000.

John Higgins was the defending champion, having defeated Mark Selby 10–8 in the 2025 final, but he lost 1–10 to Zhao Xintong in the semi-finals. Zhao went on to defeat Judd Trump 10–3 in the final to win his sixth ranking title. Having already won the 2026 World Grand Prix and the 2026 Players Championship, Zhao became the first player to win all three Players Series events in the same season. The winner's prize made him the third player, after Trump and Ronnie O'Sullivan, to surpass £1 million in prize money in a single season. He advanced to a career high of fourth in the world rankings after the event. The tournament produced 24 century breaks, of which the highest was a 140 by Trump in his quarter-final match against Shaun Murphy.

== Overview ==
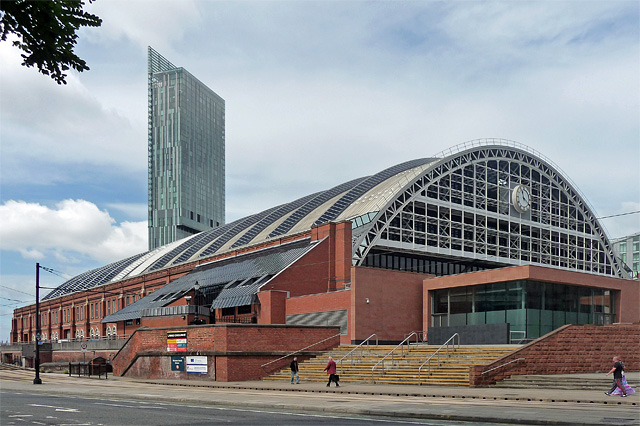
The event took place at the Manchester Central in Manchester, England.

First held in 2019, the Tour Championship is the only event on the professional tour other than the World Championship to feature multi-session matches throughout the entire tournament. Ronnie O'Sullivan won the inaugural edition, staged in Llandudno, Wales, with a 13–11 victory over Neil Robertson in the final. The field of players was originally the top 8 on the one-year ranking list, but it was subsequently expanded to the top 12, beginning with the 2024 edition.

The 2026 edition of the tournament—its eighth consecutive staging since the inaugural edition in 2019—took place from 30 March to 5 April at the Manchester Central in Manchester, England. It was the 17th and penultimate ranking event of the 2025–26 snooker season, following the 2026 World Open and preceding the 2026 World Championship; it was also the last of three events in the season's Players Series, following the 2026 World Grand Prix and the 2026 Players Championship. John Higgins was the defending champion, having defeated Mark Selby 10–8 in the 2025 final to win the title for the first time. As with the previous edition, there was a free fan zone at the venue.

=== Format ===
The event featured 12 participants. The top four seeds received byes to the quarter-finals. Players seeded 5 through 8 faced players seeded 9 through 12 for the other four quarter-final places. All matches, including the final, were played as the best of 19 frames, held over two sessions.

=== Seeding list ===
Unlike other events where the defending champion is seeded first, the reigning World Champion second, and the rest based on the world rankings, the qualification and seedings in the Players Series tournaments are determined by the one-year ranking list. The top 12 players on that list, as it stood after the 2026 World Open, automatically qualified for the tournament. Ronnie O'Sullivan was in eighth place at the cutoff but had elected not to enter; this meant that the player ranked 13th became eligible. By winning the 2026 World Open, Thepchaiya Un-Nooh advanced from 31st to 10th place and qualified for the event. This displaced Xiao Guodong to 14th place, making him no longer eligible.

The below list shows the top 12 seeds for the event, determined by their ranking points earned from the beginning of the 2025–26 season until the conclusion of the 2026 World Open:

Seed	Player	Points
1	Neil Robertson (AUS)	648,500
2	Zhao Xintong (CHN)	466,550
3	Mark Selby (ENG)	424,350
4	Shaun Murphy (ENG)	398,900
5	Judd Trump (ENG)	372,350
6	Mark Williams (WAL)	347,800

Seed	Player	Points
7	Wu Yize (CHN)	340,300
8	Barry Hawkins (ENG)	288,800
9	Thepchaiya Un-Nooh (THA)	272,100
10	Chris Wakelin (ENG)	264,800
11	John Higgins (SCO)	259,600
12	Mark Allen (NIR)	259,350

=== Broadcasters ===
The tournament was broadcast in the United Kingdom by 5, which televised the event for the first time, replacing previous broadcaster ITV. In mainland Europe, it was broadcast by Eurosport, with streaming coverage on Discovery+ in Germany, Italy, and Austria and on HBO Max in other European territories. It was broadcast in mainland China by Migu, Huya, CBSA-WPBSA Academy WeChat Channel, and CBSA-WPBSA Academy Douyin; in Hong Kong by Now TV; in Malaysia and Brunei by Astro SuperSport; in Taiwan by Sportcast; in Thailand by TrueSports; in the Philippines by TAP Sports; in Singapore by Star Hub; and in Nigeria, South Africa, Ghana, and Kenya by SportyTV. In territories where no other coverage was available, including the Republic of Ireland, the tournament was streamed by WST Play.

=== Prize fund ===
The breakdown of prize money for the event is shown below:

- Winner: £150,000
- Runner-up: £60,000
- Semi-final: £40,000
- Quarter-final: £30,000
- Last 12: £20,000
- Highest break: £10,000
- Total: £500,000

== Summary ==
=== First round ===
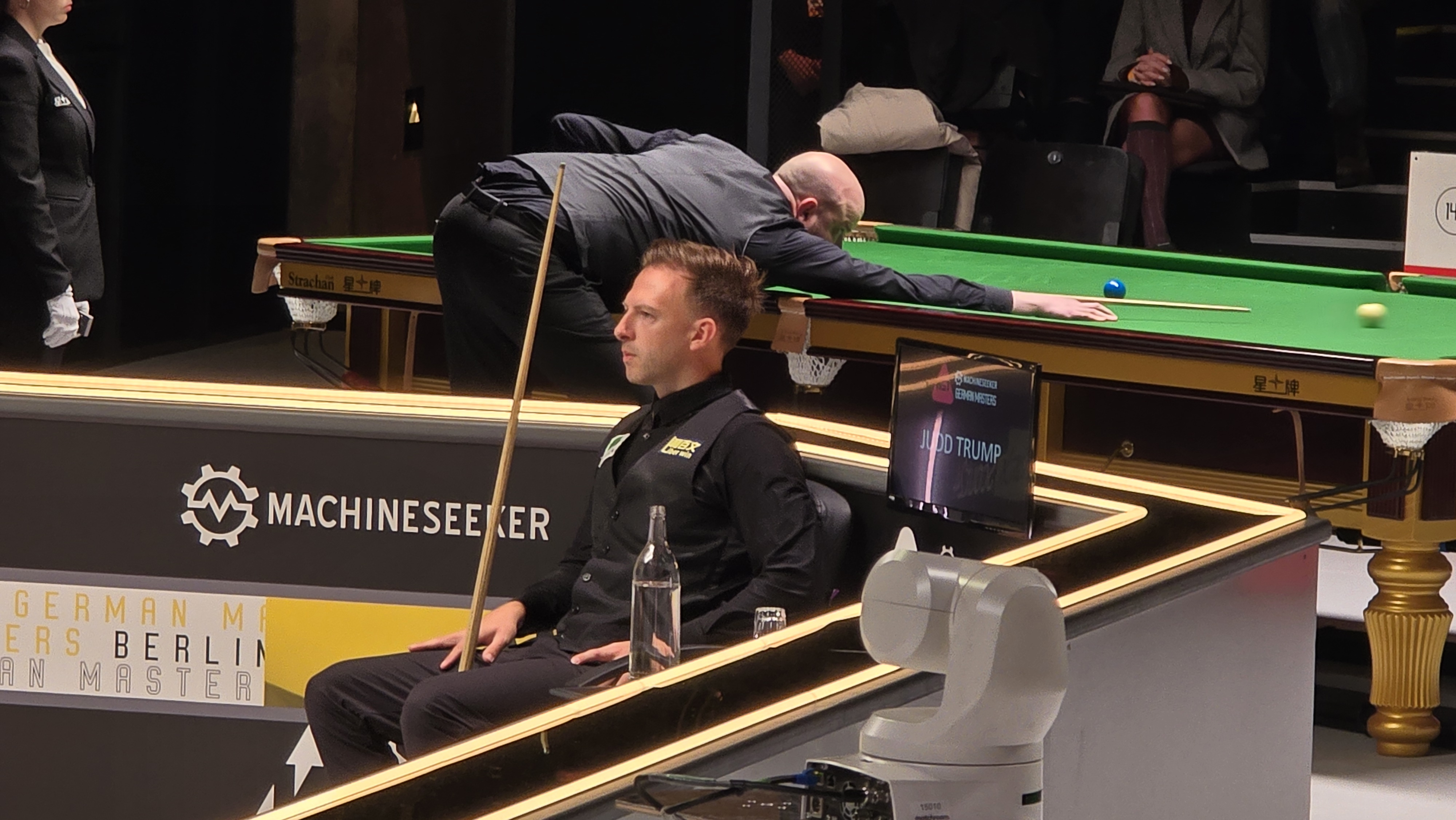
Judd Trump (pictured in 2026) defeated Mark Allen 10–8 to win his first match at the Tour Championship since the 2020 edition. Trump went on to reach the final of the event for the first time.

In the first round, players seeded 5 through 8 faced players seeded 9 through 12. The world number one and fifth seed Judd Trump faced the twelfth seed Mark Allen. Despite making a highest break of only 38 in the first four frames, Allen won all four on the colours. Trump made breaks including 71, 104, and 88 as he also won four consecutive frames, tying the scores at 4–4 after the first session. When play resumed, Allen won frame nine with a century break of 121, but Trump tied the scores at 5–5 and then moved ahead for the first time by winning frame 11 on a re-spotted black. Allen tied the scores at 6–6 with another century of 121, but Trump won frame 13 with a century of 114 and then came from 42 points behind to take frame 14 with an 86 clearance, moving two frames ahead at 8–6. Allen won the 15th frame, but Trump took the 16th with a 67 break to lead 9–7. In frame 17, Trump missed a red while on a break of 35, and Allen made a frame-winning clearance of 79. Trump produced a century of 100 in frame 18 to complete a 10–8 win, his first victory at the Tour Championship since the 2020 edition. "At 4–4 I was delighted, and tonight was a great standard," Trump said afterwards. "I have been consistent for the last five or six months, I have had a lot of semis and finals. I am happy with my form."

The eighth seed Barry Hawkins, recent winner of the 2026 Welsh Open, faced the ninth seed Thepchaiya Un-Nooh, recent winner of the 2026 World Open. Un-Nooh led 3–2, but Hawkins then made breaks including 79 and 86 as he won three consecutive frames, ending the opening session with a 5–3 advantage. When play resumed for the second session, Un-Nooh won frame nine on the colours, but Hawkins took frame 10 with a century of 101. Un-Nooh won frame 11 after fluking the last yellow and also won the next two, moving 7–6 ahead. Un-Nooh missed a red in frame 14 while on a break of 50, and Hawkins tied the scores at 7–7 with a clearance of 72. Un-Nooh won frame 15 with a 66 break but missed a red in frame 16 while on a break of 48, and Hawkins tied the scores again at 8–8 with a 68 break. After winning a tactical battle on the last two reds to take frame 17, Hawkins made a 63 break in frame 18 and went on to win it on the colours, completing a 10–8 victory. "I nicked quite a few frames," Hawkins commented afterwards. "I didn't feel I played great, I was just battling away. It was getting twitchy at the end so it's a great win. I have had good runs in this event, especially as it's such a tough event just to win matches in, given the players who qualify."

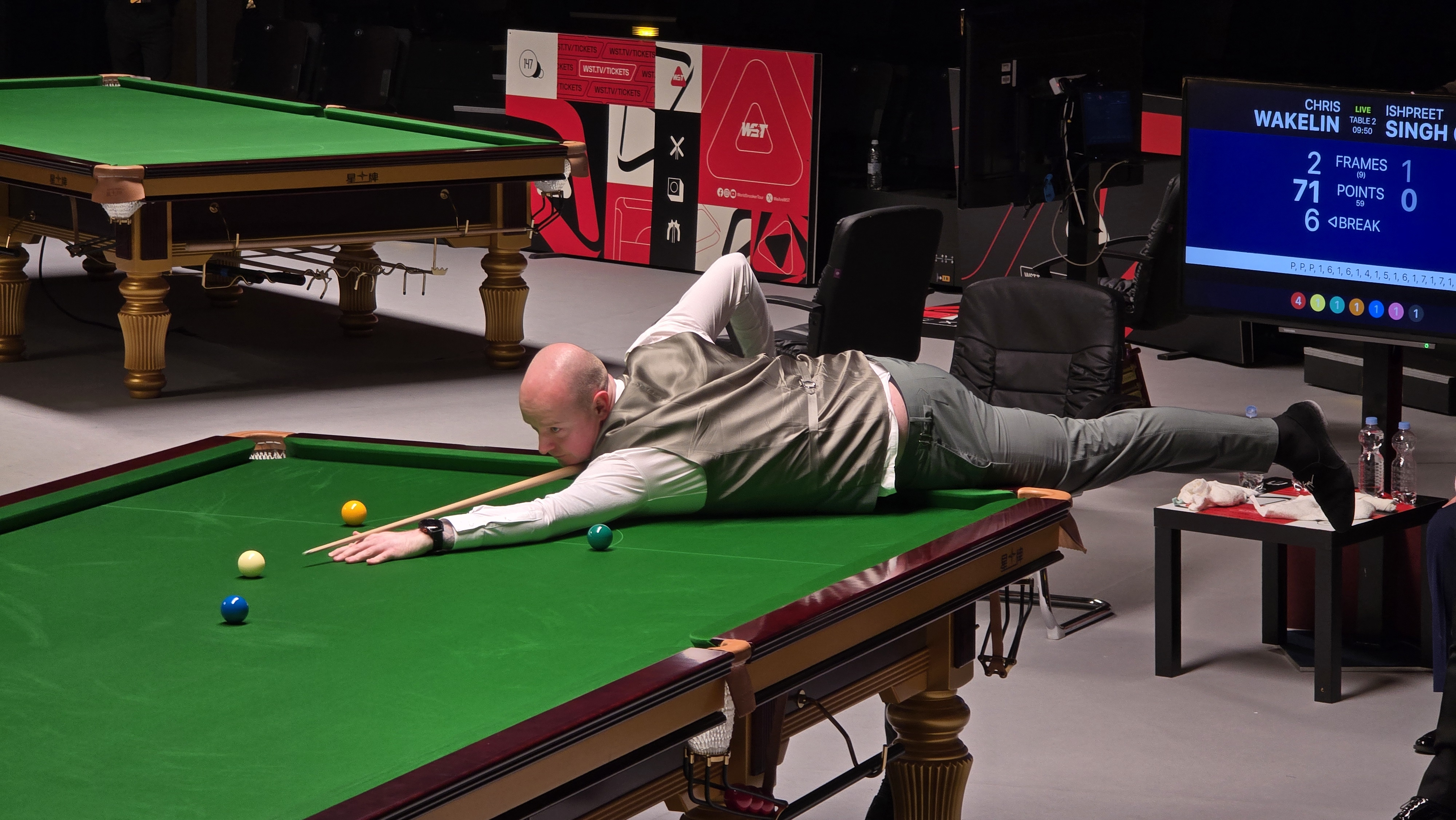
Chris Wakelin (pictured in 2026) won eight consecutive frames as he came from 2–6 behind to defeat Wu Yize 10–6.

The seventh seed Wu Yize, who had entered the top 16 for the first time that season after winning the 2025 International Championship, faced the tenth seed Chris Wakelin. Wu produced breaks of 73, 74, 84, 75, and 81 as he moved into a 6–2 lead after the first session. In the second session, Wakelin made breaks including 84, 62, and 108 as he won all eight frames played, defeating Wu 10–6. "The way Wu played in the first session, I went to bed last night thinking I can't compete with that," Wakelin commented after the match. "I knew I had to come out tonight and find my own form and get something going. He missed a couple of balls in the first frame and I thought I could apply some pressure. Once I got back to 6–4, it was game on."

The 2024 winner and sixth seed Mark Williams played the defending champion and eleventh seed John Higgins. Williams made a century of 121 as he took a 2–0 lead, but Higgins won the remaining six frames of the session to lead 6–2. In the second session, Higgins made an 84 break to win frame nine, his seventh consecutive frame of the match, for a 7–2 lead. Williams took frame 10 after Higgins missed a pot on the last green, made breaks of 74 and 82 to win frames 11 and 12, and also took frame 13 to reduce Higgins's lead to one at 7–6. Higgins produced a century of 110 to move 8–6 ahead, but Williams made breaks of 107 and 76 as he tied the scores at 8–8. Despite having lost six of the previous seven frames, Higgins won the last two frames for a 10–8 victory. It was the first time Higgins had beaten Williams in a multi-session match since the semi-finals of the 2011 World Championship. "I am delighted to do to Mark [Williams] what he has done to me in the last few years," said Higgins afterwards. "It would have been a tough loss having been 7–2 in front."

=== Quarter-finals ===
In the quarter-finals, the first-round winners played the top four seeds. Trump faced the number four seed Shaun Murphy, who won the opening two frames. Trump took frame three on the colours, made a total clearance of 140 to win frame four, and then took frame five after snookering Murphy on the last blue, moving 3–2 ahead. Murphy won the next two frames with breaks of 132 and 71, but Trump won the last of the session to tie the scores at 4–4. When play resumed, Trump took frame nine, but Murphy then won three in a row, making breaks including 69 and 127 to lead 7–5. Trump responded with breaks of 62 and 86 to tie the scores at 7–7. Murphy won frame 15, but Trump won the next two with breaks of 90 and 137 to move 9–8 ahead. Murphy made a 96 break in frame 18 to level at 9–9. In the deciding frame, Murphy lost position while on a break of 30 and missed an attempted double on a red, allowing Trump to secure a 10–9 victory with a 59 break. It was the first time Trump had won a deciding frame that season, out of nine played. "Having not won a decider all season, it was tough," Trump commented. "In my most successful seasons, I have won nearly all of my deciding frames and that can give you a lifeline in tournaments."

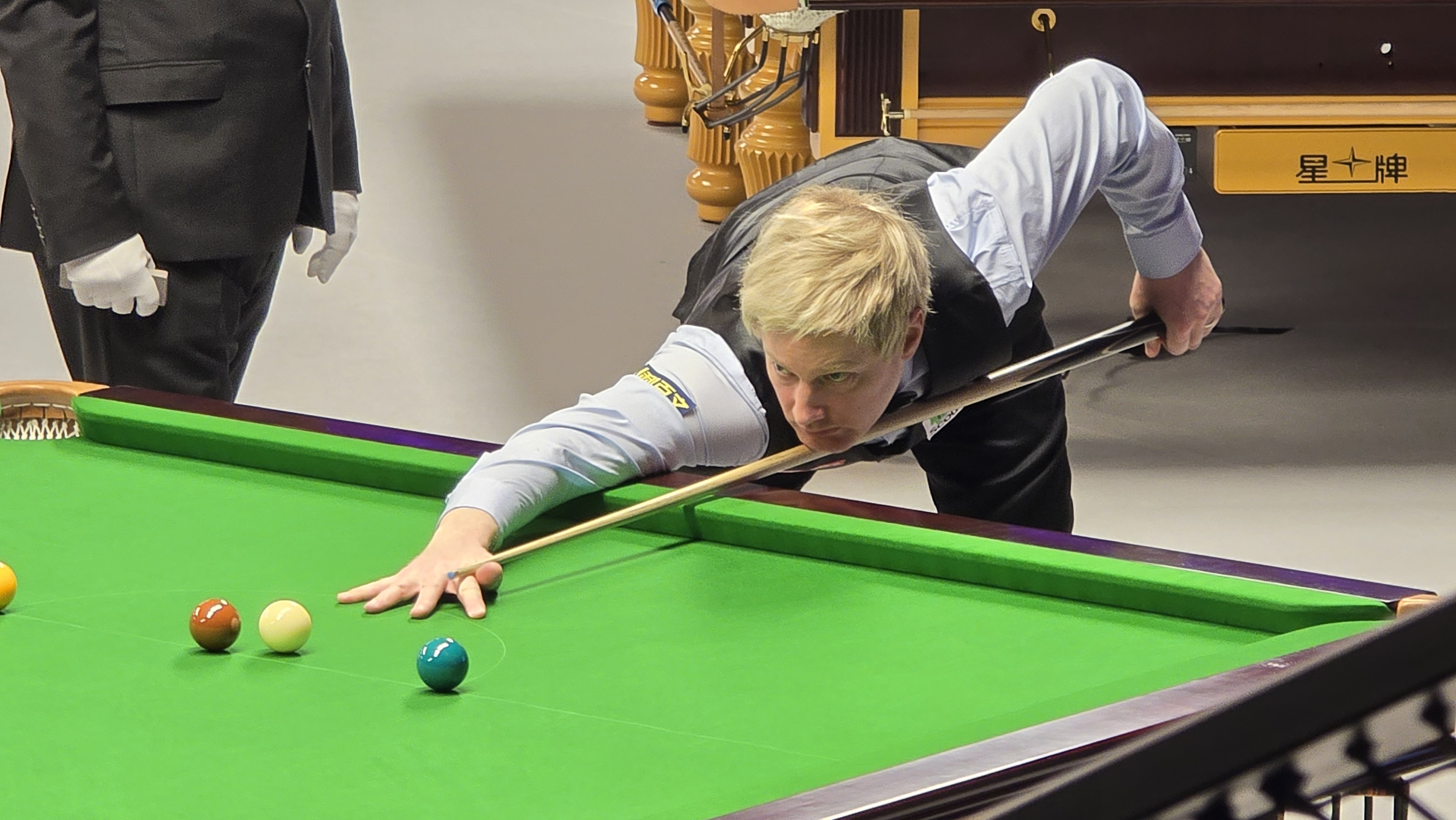
The number one seed Neil Robertson (pictured in 2025) defeated Barry Hawkins 10–8 in the quarter-finals but lost 4–10 to Judd Trump in the semi-finals.

Hawkins played the number one seed Neil Robertson, who had claimed back-to-back titles in 2021 and 2022. The scores were tied at 2–2 and 3–3, but Robertson won frame seven after laying a snooker on the last brown and took frame eight with a 78 break to end the session 5–3 ahead. In the second session, Hawkins won four consecutive frames to lead 7–5, but Robertson narrowed Hawkins' lead to one frame at 8–7. In frame 16, Hawkins was on a break of 55 when he missed a pot on the pink. Robertson recovered to win the frame after laying a snooker on the last red, tying the scores at 8–8, and went on to secure a 10–8 victory. "The frame to go 8–8 was massive," Robertson said afterwards. "I had a good tactical train of thought. I was thinking ahead and staying calm." Wakelin faced the reigning World Champion and number two seed Zhao Xintong, winner of the season's two previous Players Series events, the 2026 World Grand Prix and the 2026 Players Championship. Zhao made centuries of 103 and 120 in the first session, ending it 5–3 ahead. In the second session, Zhao won five of the six frames played, making three further centuries of 134, 108, and 101 as he completed a 10–4 victory, his first win at the Tour Championship.

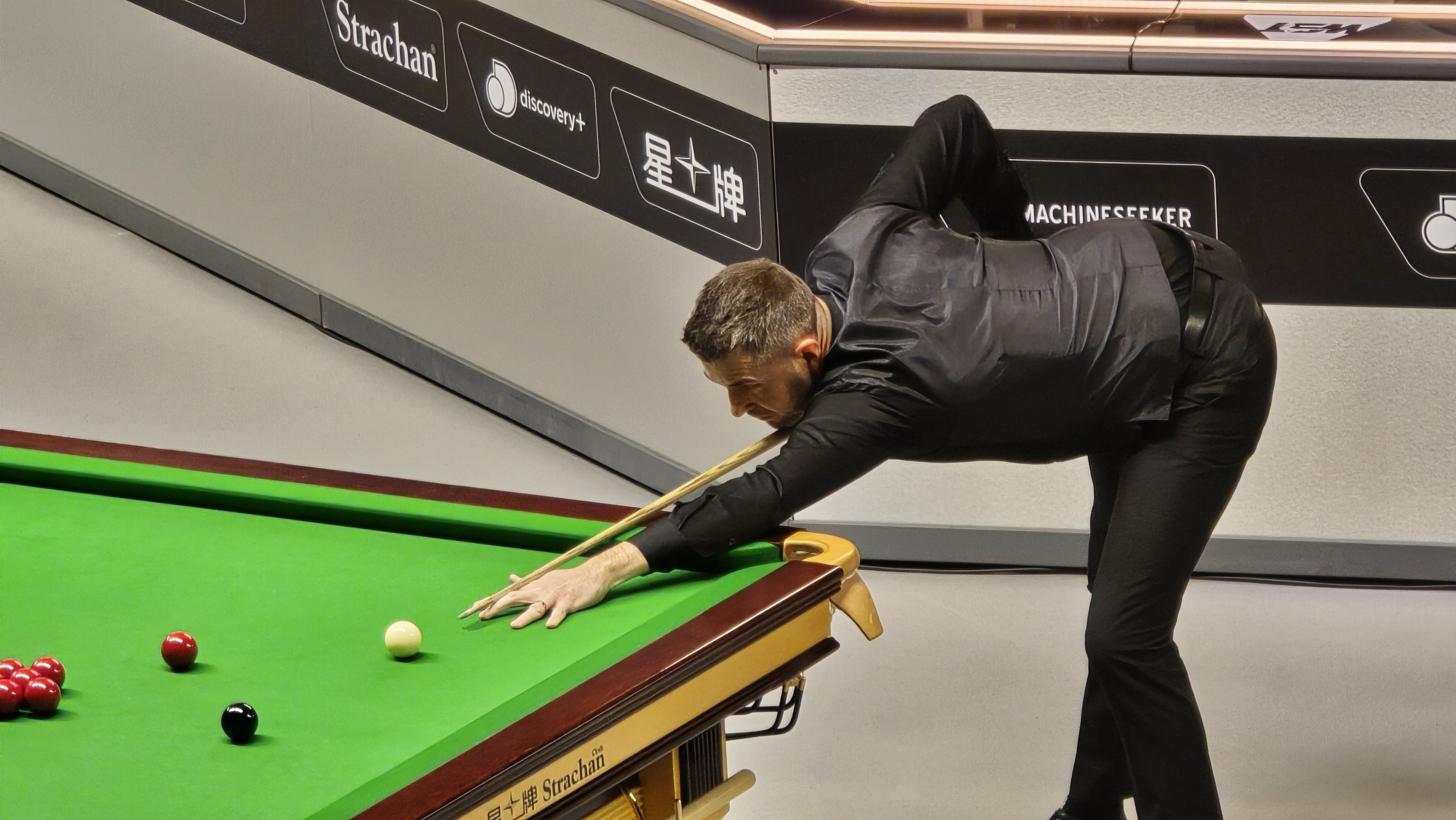
The previous year's finalists, Mark Selby (pictured in 2025) and John Higgins, met in the quarter-finals. As in the previous year's final, Selby won five consecutive frames to go 8–5 in front but Higgins won the next five for a 10–8 victory.

The defending champion Higgins won three consecutive frames as he took a 3–1 lead over the previous year's runner-up and number three seed Mark Selby. Selby recovered to tie the scores at 3–3, but Higgins won the last two frames of the session for a 5–3 advantage. In the second session, Selby took frame nine with a break of 127 and won the tenth after Higgins missed a pot on the second-last red along the top cushion. Selby took the 11th frame when Higgins missed the blue after potting the last red, won the 12th after Higgins missed the penultimate red while playing the shot with the long rest, and took the 13th with a century of 131 to lead 8–5. Higgins won the 14th frame on the colours and then made a 92 break to take the 15th. Selby led by 46 points in frame 16 when he missed a pot on the blue, and Higgins produced a clearance of 74 to tie the scores at 8–8. Higgins went on to make breaks of 78 and 72 as he secured a 10–8 victory. The match followed the same pattern as the previous year's final, in which Selby had also won five consecutive frames to lead 8–5, only to lose the last five frames. "At 8–5 I was just thinking back to last year's final and keeping positive thoughts," Higgins said afterwards. "The first four frames tonight, I wasn't really competing. Mark [Selby] gave me a couple of chances but I just felt my game wasn't there. But the game just spun around."

=== Semi-finals ===
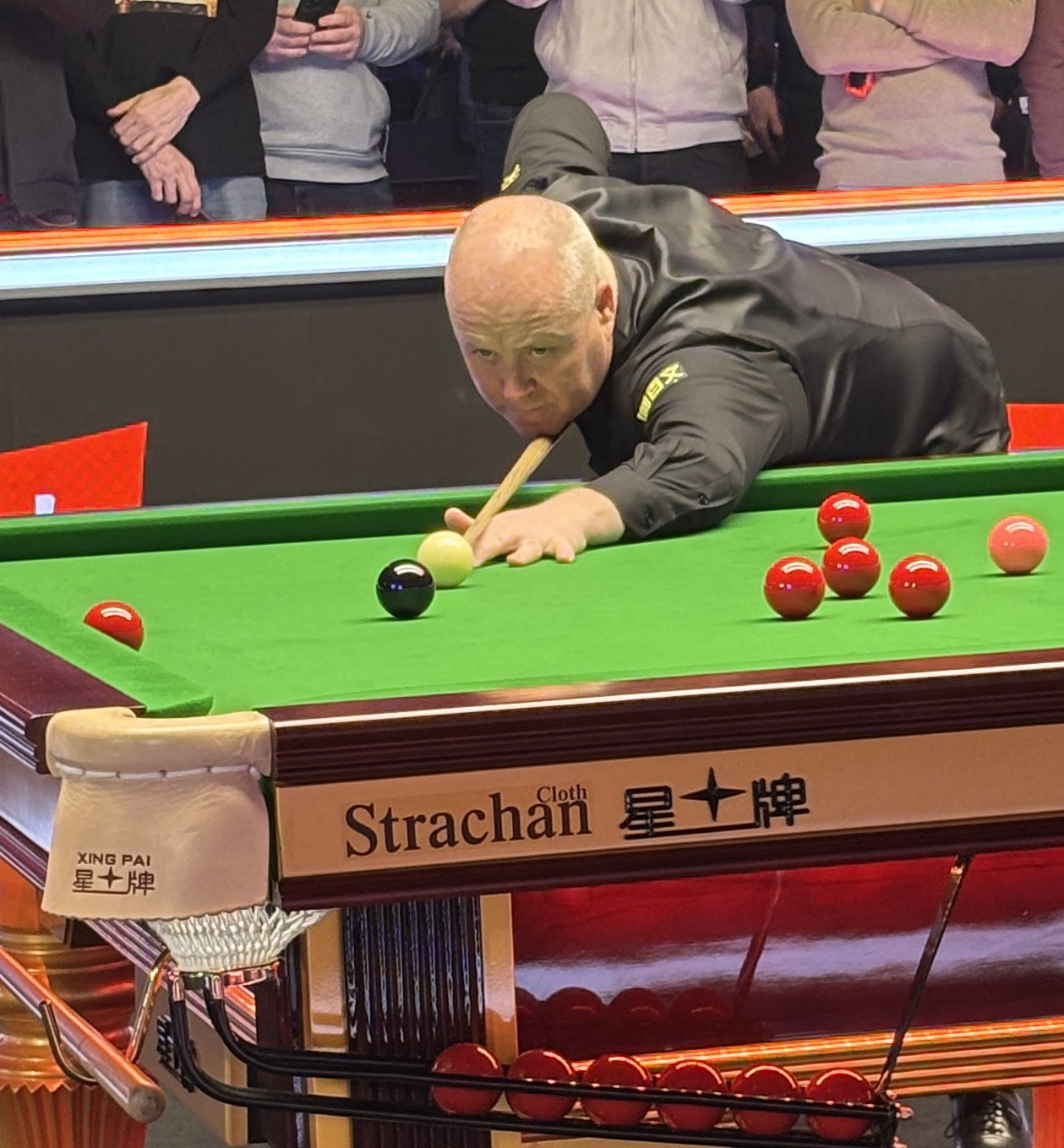
The defending champion John Higgins (pictured in 2026) lost 1–10 to the reigning World Champion Zhao Xintong. It was Higgins's heaviest ever defeat in a best-of-19-frame match.

In the first semi-final, the world number one Trump played the number one seed Robertson. Trump made breaks of 87, 94, and 113 as he won the first three frames without Robertson scoring a point and led 4–0 at the mid-session interval. In frame five, Robertson was on a break of 52 when he missed the black off its spot; Trump secured the frame and then won the sixth with breaks of 37 and 49 to go 6–0 ahead. Robertson took the seventh with a break of 61, but Trump made a 58 break to win frame eight, ending the first session with a 7–1 advantage. Robertson won the first two frames of the second session, but Trump took three of the next four to complete a 10–4 victory. "I have not played well in this event before so it's nice to come here this week to a great arena and put that right," Trump said afterwards. "I never expected it to be comfortable today but I got off to a really good start. After that I dropped my standard a bit but I had done all the damage." Robertson said that his play had been "garbage," adding: "When I get involved in safety I am just not good enough at this level to compete."

In the second semi-final, the defending champion Higgins played the reigning World Champion Zhao. It was Higgins's 93rd ranking semi-final, putting him three behind the record 96 played by Ronnie O'Sullivan. Zhao made breaks including 69, 64, and 81 as he took a 4–0 lead at the mid-session interval. Zhao then produced further breaks of 74, 78, 62, and 104 as he completed a session whitewash for an 8–0 lead. When play resumed, Zhao moved 9–0 ahead. While on a break of 41 in frame 10, Zhao missed the pink, and Higgins produced a 79 clearance to win his only frame of the match. Zhao completed a 10–1 victory with an 85 break in frame 11. It was Higgins's heaviest defeat in a best-of-19-frame match. "I played well and I am very happy to reach the final," said Zhao afterwards. "My cueing was very good. I tried not to think too much; I just enjoyed the table and concentrated on the balls."

=== Final ===
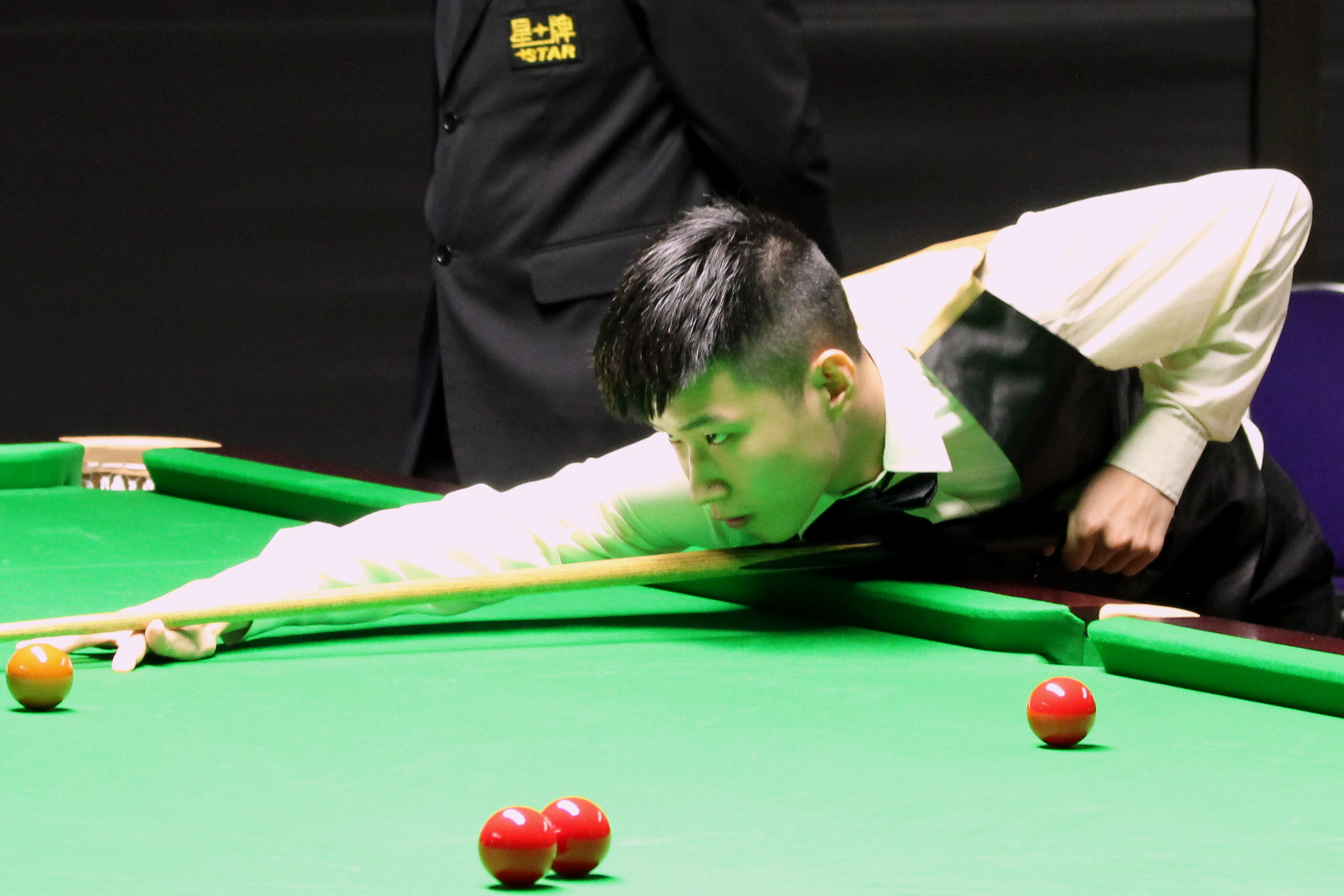
Zhao Xintong (pictured in 2016) defeated Judd Trump 10–3, winning his sixth ranking title. He became the first player to win all three Players Series titles in the same season and advanced to a career high of fourth in the world rankings.

The final took place on 5 April as the best of 19 frames, played over two sessions, between the reigning World Champion Zhao and the world number one Trump. It was the 53rd ranking final of Trump's career and the sixth of Zhao's. Both players reached the Tour Championship final for the first time. It was their sixth meeting in professional competition, Trump having won three of the previous five. It was the first time they had contested a final.

Zhao made a break of 64 in the opening frame to leave Trump requiring snookers. Trump obtained the penalty points he needed, but Zhao won the frame after potting the last red and made a 68 break to win the second. Trump took the third with a 61 break and also won the fourth to tie the scores at 2–2. Zhao won frame five with breaks of 40 and 25 and then took frames six and seven with breaks of 91 and 98. Trump won frame eight to leave Zhao with a 5–3 advantage. When play resumed for the second session, Zhao won frame nine after doubling the last red and took frame 10 with breaks of 45 and 39. In frame 11, Zhao took the lead with a 63 break. Trump attempted a clearance but failed to gain position on the last red, and Zhao secured the frame to lead 8–3. Zhao went on to complete a 10–3 victory, winning his sixth ranking title and becoming the first player to win all three Players Series events—the World Grand Prix, Players Championship, and Tour Championship—in the same season. He became the third player, following Trump and O'Sullivan, to earn over £1 million in a single season, and he advanced to a career high of fourth place in the world rankings.

Afterwards, Zhao said: "Judd [Trump] is my favourite player, I know he is very good. I am really happy just to play a final against him and I am lucky to win one. It's an amazing moment for my career. This win is very important for me, I didn't want to lose in the final. Next it's the World Championship and hopefully I can keep going." Trump commented: "I didn't perform today, for whatever reason. I'm just disappointed because the crowd spurred me on. Zhao has had an amazing tournament, he has been brilliant in these three [Players Series] events and won them all very convincingly."

== Tournament draw ==
Numbers in parentheses after the players' names denote the players' seedings and players in bold denote match winners. All matches are played as the best of 19 frames. Seeds 1 to 4 received a bye in the first round.

**First round** Best of 19 frames
30 and 31 March
**Barry Hawkins (ENG) (8)**	**10**
Thepchaiya Un-Nooh (THA) (9)	8
30 March
**Judd Trump (ENG) (5)**	**10**
Mark Allen (NIR) (12)	8
31 March
Mark Williams (WAL) (6)	8
**John Higgins (SCO) (11)**	**10**
30 and 31 March
Wu Yize (CHN) (7)	6
**Chris Wakelin (ENG) (10)**	**10**

**Quarter-finals**; Best of 19 frames
1 and 2 April
**Neil Robertson (AUS) (1)**	**10**
Barry Hawkins (ENG) (8)	8
1 April
Shaun Murphy (ENG) (4)	9
**Judd Trump (ENG) (5)**	**10**
2 April
Mark Selby (ENG) (3)	8
**John Higgins (SCO) (11)**	**10**
1 and 2 April
**Zhao Xintong (CHN) (2)**	**10**
Chris Wakelin (ENG) (10)	4

**Semi-finals**; Best of 19 frames
3 April
Neil Robertson (AUS) (1)	4
**Judd Trump (ENG) (5)**	**10**
4 April
John Higgins (SCO) (11)	1
**Zhao Xintong (CHN) (2)**	**10**

**Final**; Best of 19 frames
5 April
Judd Trump (ENG) (5)	3
**Zhao Xintong (CHN) (2)**	**10**

=== Final: frame scores ===
Final: Best of 19 frames. Referee: Desislava Bozhilova; Manchester Central, Manchester, England, 5 April 2026
Judd Trump (5); England	3–**10**	**Zhao Xintong** (2); China
Afternoon: 34–**73**, 0–**92**, **66**–6, **70**–13, 35–**65**, 6–**91**, 0–**99**, **80**–39; Evening: 48–**67**, 0–**90**, 35–**72**, 21–**70**, 30–**83**
(frame 3) 61	Highest break	**98** (frame 7)
0	Century breaks	0

== Century breaks ==
A total of 24 century breaks were made during the tournament.

- 140, 137, 114, 113, 104, 100 – Judd Trump
- 134, 120, 108, 104, 103, 101 – Zhao Xintong
- 132, 127 – Shaun Murphy
- 131, 127 – Mark Selby
- 121, 121 – Mark Allen
- 121, 107 – Mark Williams
- 110 – John Higgins
- 108 – Chris Wakelin
- 103 – Thepchaiya Un-Nooh
- 101 – Barry Hawkins
