= 2023 Tour Championship =

Snooker tournament

2023 Duelbits Tour Championship
Tournament information
- Dates: 27 March – 2 April 2023
- Venue: Bonus Arena
- City: Hull
- Country: England
- Organisation: World Snooker Tour
- Format: Ranking event
- Total prize fund: £380,000
- Winner's share: £150,000
- Highest break: Ryan Day (WAL) (147)

Final
- Champion: Shaun Murphy (ENG)
- Runner-up: Kyren Wilson (ENG)
- Score: 10–7

The 2023 Tour Championship (officially the 2023 Duelbits Tour Championship) was a professional snooker tournament that took place from 27 March to 2 April 2023 at the Bonus Arena in Hull, England. Organised by the World Snooker Tour, it was the fifth edition of the Tour Championship, first held in 2019, and the 14th and penultimate ranking event of the 2022–23 snooker season, preceding the 2023 World Snooker Championship. The last of three events in the Players Series, following the 2023 World Grand Prix and the 2023 Players Championship, it comprised the top eight players on the one-year ranking list as it stood following the 2023 WST Classic. Broadcast by ITV Sport domestically and sponsored by sports betting company Duelbits, the event featured a prize fund of £380,000, of which the winner received £150,000.

Neil Robertson won the 2022 event, defeating John Higgins 10–9 in the final. However, Robertson was unable to defend the title because he was outside the top eight on the one-year ranking list after the WST Classic. Shaun Murphy won the event, defeating Kyren Wilson 10–7 in the final to capture the 11th ranking title of his career.

There were 22 century breaks made during the event, the highest of which was a maximum break by Ryan Day, his third in professional competition, during his quarter-final match against Mark Selby. Day also made a rare 16-red clearance in the same match.

== Format ==
The 2023 Tour Championship (officially the 2023 Duelbits Tour Championship) was the third and final event in the 2022–23 Players Series, first introduced in the 2018–19 snooker season; the other events in the series were the World Grand Prix and the Players Championship. Organised by the World Snooker Tour, it was the 14th and penultimate ranking event of the 2022–23 snooker season, following the WST Classic and preceding the World Championship. The Tour Championship featured the top eight players from the one-year ranking list taking part in a single-elimination tournament following the WST Classic. All matches were played as the best of 19 frames held over two sessions.

The event took place from 27 March to 2 April 2023 at the Bonus Arena in Hull, England. It was broadcast in the United Kingdom by ITV; China by Liaoning TV, Superstar online, Migu, Youku and Huya.com; in Canada, the US and Brazil by DAZN and by Setanta, Sportklub, Viaplay and Viasat across Europe. In other territories, it was broadcast in the Philippines by TAP; Hong Kong by Now TV; in Thailand by True Sport; Pakistan by FastsportsHD; Taiwan and Indonesia by Sport Cast and in Malaysia and Brunei by Astro SuperSport. In all other territories it was available for broadcast by Matchroom Sport. The event was sponsored for the first time by sports betting company Duelbits. Neil Robertson won the 2022 event, defeating John Higgins in the final. Neither Robertson nor Higgins was eligible to compete in the 2023 event as they were outside the top eight on the one-year ranking list at the cutoff point.

=== Qualification ===
The participants were determined by the points won in the ranking tournaments in the season's events preceding the Tour Championship. Points earned from all ranking events in the season, up to and including the 2023 WST Classic were counted. Players were seeded into the draw based on the same values.

| Seed | Player | Total points |
|---|---|---|
| 1 | Mark Allen (NIR) | 530,500 |
| 2 | Shaun Murphy (ENG) | 240,000 |
| 3 | Mark Selby (ENG) | 215,500 |
| 4 | Ali Carter (ENG) | 203,500 |
| 5 | Kyren Wilson (ENG) | 179,000 |
| 6 | Ryan Day (WAL) | 159,000 |
| 7 | Robert Milkins (ENG) | 157,500 |
| 8 | Ding Junhui (CHN) | 140,500 |

=== Prize fund ===
The total prize fund for the event was £380,000, with the winner receiving £150,000. A breakdown of the prize money for the event is shown below:

- Winner: £150,000
- Runner-up: £60,000
- Semi-final: £40,000
- Quarter-final: £20,000
- Highest break: £10,000
- Total: £380,000

== Summary ==
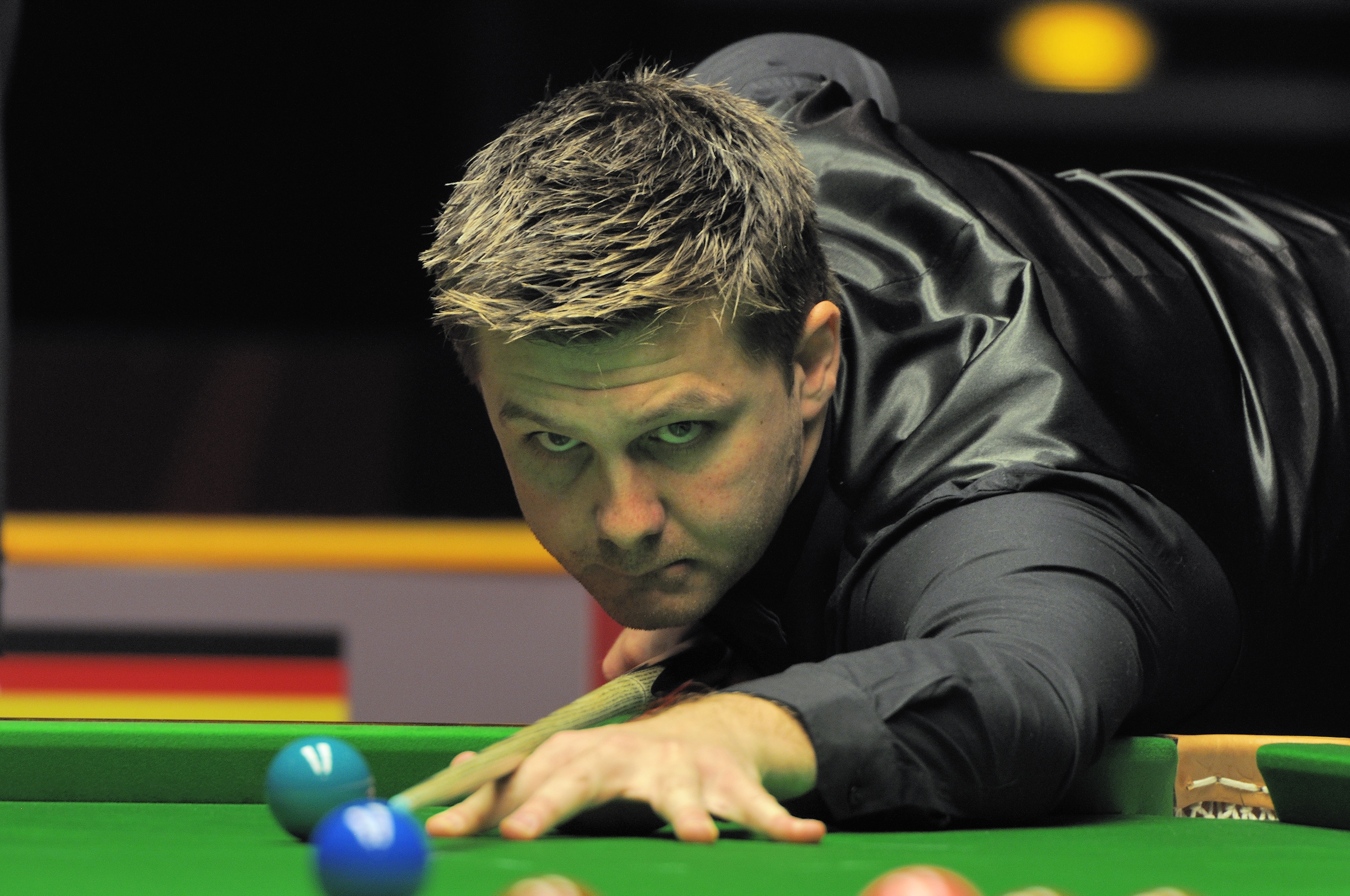
Ryan Day made a maximum break in the opening round.

The opening round featured eight players and was contested from 27 to 30 March over two sessions as the best of 19 frames. The opening match was contested between the two finalists of the UK Championship – Mark Allen and Ding Junhui. Allen won the first opening two frames, making a break of 72 in the second, before Ding tied the match at 2–2, making a century break in frame three. Allen won frame five; however, Ding made three breaks of above 50 to lead by two frames, 5–3, after the first session. Returning for the evening session, Ding won the first three frames to lead 8–3. Allen won frame 12 with a break of 65 but still trailed by five frames as Ding won frame 13. After Allen won frame 14, Ding made a break of 95 to win the match 10–5. Ding commented that his recent win at the Six-red World Championship gave him the confidence to defeat Allen. The win meant that Ding had automatically qualified as a seeded player for the 2023 World Snooker Championship, as he was now ranked 16th in the world.

The second match was between Kyren Wilson and Ali Carter. Before the match, Wilson and family had been visiting hospital after his son had a suspected cancerous tumour in January. Wilson won the first five frames of the match, including making a break of 137 in the second frame. Carter responded by making a break of 91 in frame six and a 131 in frame seven. However, Wilson won the final frame of the first session to lead 6–2. In the evening session, Carter won the opening frame, with a break of 61, but Wilson won the next three frames to lead 9–3. Carter won frame 13 before Wilson won the match 10–4 with a break of 86 in frame 14. Carter commented that a "subdued atmosphere" was to blame for his performance with the event having a small crowd.

Shaun Murphy and Robert Milkins met in the third opening round match, a rematch of the Welsh Open final, which was won by Milkins. Milkins took the early lead in the match, winning five of the first six frames, but Murphy won the final two frames of the session to trail 3–5. Milkins won the first frame of the second session, but Murphy won five frames in a row to lead 8–6. Milkins won both of the next two frames to tie the match at 8–8, but Murphy won the next frame. Murphy then won the match 10–8, making a break of 128 in the final frame. Milkins commented that he had "played terribly tonight, long distance [pots] I didn't have a clue", whilst also having issues with his cue tip. Murphy also commented that the small crowd size during the first round matches had made the performance difficult.

Mark Selby and Ryan Day met in the final opening round match. After Selby had taken the first two frames, Day made a maximum break in the third. This was Day's third competitive maximum break and was the highest of the tournament. However, Selby still led 6–2 after the afternoon session. Selby won the first two frames of the evening session to extend his lead to 8–2. Day then won five of the next six frames to reduce Selby's lead to 9–7 before Selby won the match in the 17th frame after a break of 77. Day made a break of 139 in the 15th frame, which was the sixth 16-red clearance in a professional tournament.

The semi-finals were played on 31 March and 1 April. Wilson won the first four frames against Ding with breaks of 78, 130, 59 and 103, making 404 points without reply. Ding won frame five, but Wilson made a 115 break to regain his four-frame lead. Ding won the next frame with a 86 break before Wilson made his fourth century break of the session to lead 6–2. Wilson made two further century breaks to lead 8–2 in the second session, with Ding making one of his own in frame 11. Wilson extended his lead to 9–3 after playing a shot too softly when attempting a seventh century break on 83. Ding won both of the next two frames, but Wilson made a break of 87 in the 15th frame to win the match 10–5. Overall, Wilson made six century breaks, one short of the record for a best-of-19 frames match held by Ding, Stephen Hendry and Judd Trump. Wilson commented that his recent issues off the table being improved had "freed the shackles" of his performance during the match.

The second semi-final was contested between Murphy and Selby, who had previously contested the 2021 World Snooker Championship final, won by Selby 18–15. Murphy won the opening frame with a break of 96, with Selby taking the next three frames. Murphy tied the scores at 3–3, making two half-century breaks. Selby and Murphy shared the next two frames to be tied at 4–4 after the afternoon session. Breaks of 46 and 71 gave Murphy a 6–4 lead before Selby won the next two frames. Murphy won frame 13, the first frame not to contain a break of over 50. Murphy also won the next two frames to lead 9–6. Selby, however, won the next three frames to tie the scores and force a deciding frame. Murphy won the final frame with a break of 59 to win the match 10–9. Selby commented that Murphy was "going to score at every single chance he got", whilst Murphy suggested that Selby "never knows when he is beat".

The final was contested between Murphy and Wilson and officiated by Malgorzata Kanieska. The pair had met on eleven previous occasions, with Murphy having won seven. Wilson made two century breaks as he won all of the first four frames. Wilson had led 4–0 in all of his matches at the event. Murphy, however, won the next four frames, including two breaks of 75 to tie the match at 4–4. Resuming the match, Wilson won frame nine with a break of 59 before Murphy tied the scores at 5–5 with a 131 break. Wilson took the lead again, but Murphy won frame 12 to tie the scores again at 6–6. Murphy led for the first time in the match as he won frame 13 and made a 115 to lead 8–6. Wilson won the next frame, with Murphy going in-off to finish the frame. Murphy made a break of 95 to lead 9–7 and won the match 10–7 by winning frame 17. This was the second time Murphy had won two ranking event titles in a season, having also won the Players Championship. Murphy commented "I'm absolutely over the moon. I've hit a really strong run of form. I am delighted". This was Murphy's 11th ranking event win, one more than Jimmy White, and made him 10th on the list of most ranking event wins. Murphy moved up to fourth in the world rankings, whilst Wilson was seventh.

== Tournament draw ==
The draw for the event is shown below. Players in bold denote match winners.

**Quarter-finals**; Best of 19 frames
1 | Mark Allen (NIR) | 5
**8** | **Ding Junhui (CHN)** | **10**
4 | Ali Carter (ENG) | 4
**5** | **Kyren Wilson (ENG)** | **10**
**3** | **Mark Selby (ENG)** | **10**
6 | Ryan Day (WAL) | 7
**2** | **Shaun Murphy (ENG)** | **10**
7 | Robert Milkins (ENG) | 8

**Semi-finals**; Best of 19 frames
8 | (China) Ding Junhui | 5
**5** | **(England) Kyren Wilson** | **10**
3 | (England) Mark Selby | 9
**2** | **(England) Shaun Murphy** | **10**

**Final**; Best of 19 frames
5 | (England) Kyren Wilson | 7
**2** | **(England) Shaun Murphy** | **10**

=== Final ===
The scores from the final are shown below.

Final: Best of 19 frames. Referee: Malgorzata Kanieska; Bonus Arena, Hull, England, 2 April 2023
| Kyren Wilson (5); England | 7–**10** | **Shaun Murphy** (2); England |
Afternoon: **108**–20 (108), **121**–0, **90**–31, **111**–0 (111), 0–**82**, 31–**73**, 11–**100**, 63–**67**; Evening: **74**–14, 0–**131** (131), **67**–15, 56–**64**, 35–**64**, 0–**115** (115), **65**–32, 0–**109**, 13–**76**
| 111 | Highest break | **131** |
| 2 | Century breaks | 2 |

== Century breaks ==
A total of 22 century breaks were made during the tournament. Ryan Day made the highest break of the event, a maximum break in his first round loss to Mark Selby.

- 147, 139 – Ryan Day
- 137, 130, 118, 115, 111, 108, 107, 103, 100 – Kyren Wilson
- 132, 131, 106 – Mark Selby
- 131, 128, 115, 106, 100 – Shaun Murphy
- 131 – Ali Carter
- 116, 113 – Ding Junhui
