= 2023 Players Championship (snooker) =

2023 Duelbits Players Championship
Tournament information
- Dates: 20–26 February 2023
- Venue: Aldersley Leisure Village
- City: Wolverhampton
- Country: England
- Organisation: World Snooker Tour
- Format: Ranking event
- Total prize fund: £385,000
- Winner's share: £125,000
- Highest break: Shaun Murphy (ENG) (145)

Final
- Champion: Shaun Murphy (ENG)
- Runner-up: Ali Carter (ENG)
- Score: 10–4

The 2023 Players Championship (officially the 2023 Duelbits Players Championship) was a professional snooker tournament that took place from 20 to 26 February 2023 at the Aldersley Leisure Village in Wolverhampton, England. The 12th ranking event of the 2022–23 season, it was the second event in the Players Series, following the World Grand Prix and preceding the Tour Championship. Featuring the top 16 players on the one-year ranking list as it stood after the 2023 Welsh Open, the event was broadcast by ITV Sport in the United Kingdom, by Eurosport in Europe, and by multiple other broadcasters internationally. The winner received £125,000 from a total prize fund of £385,000.

Neil Robertson won the 2022 event, defeating Barry Hawkins 10–5 in the final, but was unable to defend the title as he was ranked outside the top 16 on the one-year ranking list at the cutoff point. Shaun Murphy won the tournament, defeating Ali Carter 10–4 in the final to claim the 10th ranking title of his career and his first ranking event win since the 2020 Welsh Open. Murphy also made the tournament's five largest breaks, the highest of which was a 145 in the second frame of the final. Of the 23 century breaks made at the event, Murphy compiled 11, breaking the previous tournament record of eight centuries set by John Higgins at the 2021 event.

== Format ==
=== Prize fund ===
The event featured a prize pool of £385,000 with the winner receiving £125,000. The breakdown of prize money for the event is shown below:

- Winner: £125,000
- Runner-up: £50,000
- Semi-final: £30,000
- Quarter-final: £15,000
- Last 16: £10,000
- Highest break: £10,000
- Total: £385,000

=== Seeding list ===
The seedings for the tournament were based on the one-year ranking list up to and including the 2023 Welsh Open.

Seed	Player	Total points
1	Mark Allen (NIR)	516,000
2	Ryan Day (WAL)	144,000
3	Kyren Wilson (ENG)	141,500
4	Robert Milkins (ENG)	139,500
5	Ali Carter (ENG)	136,000
6	Ding Junhui (CHN)	130,500
7	Mark Selby (ENG)	125,500
8	Luca Brecel (BEL)	116,000
9	Jack Lisowski (ENG)	115,000
10	Shaun Murphy (ENG)	112,000
11	Gary Wilson (ENG)	107,500
12	Judd Trump (ENG)	105,500
13	Tom Ford (ENG)	103,500
14	Zhou Yuelong (CHN)	79,500
15	Chris Wakelin (ENG)	73,500
16	Joe O'Connor (ENG)	72,000

== Tournament draw ==
Results from the event are shown below. Players in bold denote match winners.

**Last 16**; Best of 11 frames
1	Mark Allen (NIR)	3
**16**	**Joe O'Connor (ENG)**	**6**
**8**	**Luca Brecel (BEL)**	**6**
9	Jack Lisowski (ENG)	4
**5**	**Ali Carter (ENG)**	**6**
12	Judd Trump (ENG)	5
**4**	**Robert Milkins (ENG)**	**6**
13	Tom Ford (ENG)	5
**3**	**Kyren Wilson (ENG)**	**6**
14	Zhou Yuelong (CHN)	2
6	Ding Junhui (CHN)	3
**11**	**Gary Wilson (ENG)**	**6**
7	Mark Selby (ENG)	3
**10**	**Shaun Murphy (ENG)**	**6**
**2**	**Ryan Day (WAL)**	**6**
15	Chris Wakelin (ENG)	2

**Quarter-finals**; Best of 11 frames
**16**	**(England) Joe O'Connor**	**6**
8	(Belgium) Luca Brecel	5
**5**	**(England) Ali Carter**	**6**
4	(England) Robert Milkins	1
**3**	**(England) Kyren Wilson**	**6**
11	(England) Gary Wilson	1
**10**	**(England) Shaun Murphy**	**6**
2	(Wales) Ryan Day	0

**Semi-finals**; Best of 11 frames
16	(England) Joe O'Connor	4
**5**	**(England) Ali Carter**	**6**
3	(England) Kyren Wilson	3
**10**	**(England) Shaun Murphy**	**6**

**Final**; Best of 19 frames
5	(England) Ali Carter	4
**10**	**(England) Shaun Murphy**	**10**

=== Final ===
Final: Best of 19 frames. Referee: Brendan Moore; Aldersley Leisure Village, Wolverhampton, England, 26 February 2023
Ali Carter (5); England	4–**10**	**Shaun Murphy** (10); England
Afternoon: 18–**67**, 0–**145** (145), 54–**68**, **128**–4 (122), 8–**46**, **99**–12, 0–**141** (141), 0–**112** (112); Evening: 0–**89**, 0–**103** (103), **72**–8, **87**–9, 48–**88**, 0–**130** (130)
122	Highest break	**145**
1	Century breaks	**5**

== Century breaks ==
There were 23 century breaks made during the event. Murphy made the highest of the tournament, a 145 during the final. Of the 23, 11 were made by Murphy, including the five highest.

- 145, 141, 137, 135, 133, 130, 112, 107, 105, 104, 103 – Shaun Murphy
- 132, 125 – Joe O'Connor
- 126 – Ding Junhui
- 122, 107 – Ali Carter
- 121, 104, 100 – Kyren Wilson
- 115 – Gary Wilson
- 104 – Jack Lisowski
- 102 – Ryan Day
- 100 – Zhou Yuelong
