= Tour Championship (snooker) =

Snooker tournament

- Part of the Players Series

Tournament information
- Venue: Manchester Central
- Location: Manchester
- Country: England
- Established: 2019
- Organisation(s): World Snooker Tour
- Format: Ranking event
- Total prize fund: £500,000
- Recent edition: 2026
- Current champion: Zhao Xintong (CHN)

The Tour Championship is a professional ranking snooker tournament first held in 2019. As the third and final tournament in the Players Series, following the World Grand Prix and the Players Championship, the event exclusively features the twelve highest-ranked players on the one-year ranking list, reflected by ranking points won at snooker world rankings events since the beginning of the season.

The event features a prize fund of £500,000, with the winner receiving £150,000. The tournament is broadcast by 5 in the United Kingdom and Eurosport across the rest of Europe. The reigning champion is Zhao Xintong, who won the 2026 Tour Championship with a 10–3 win over Judd Trump in the final.

== History ==
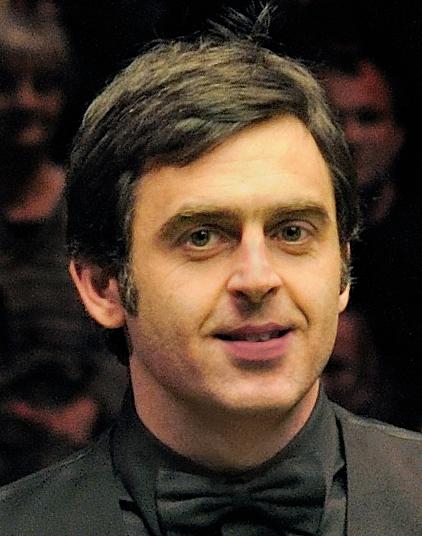
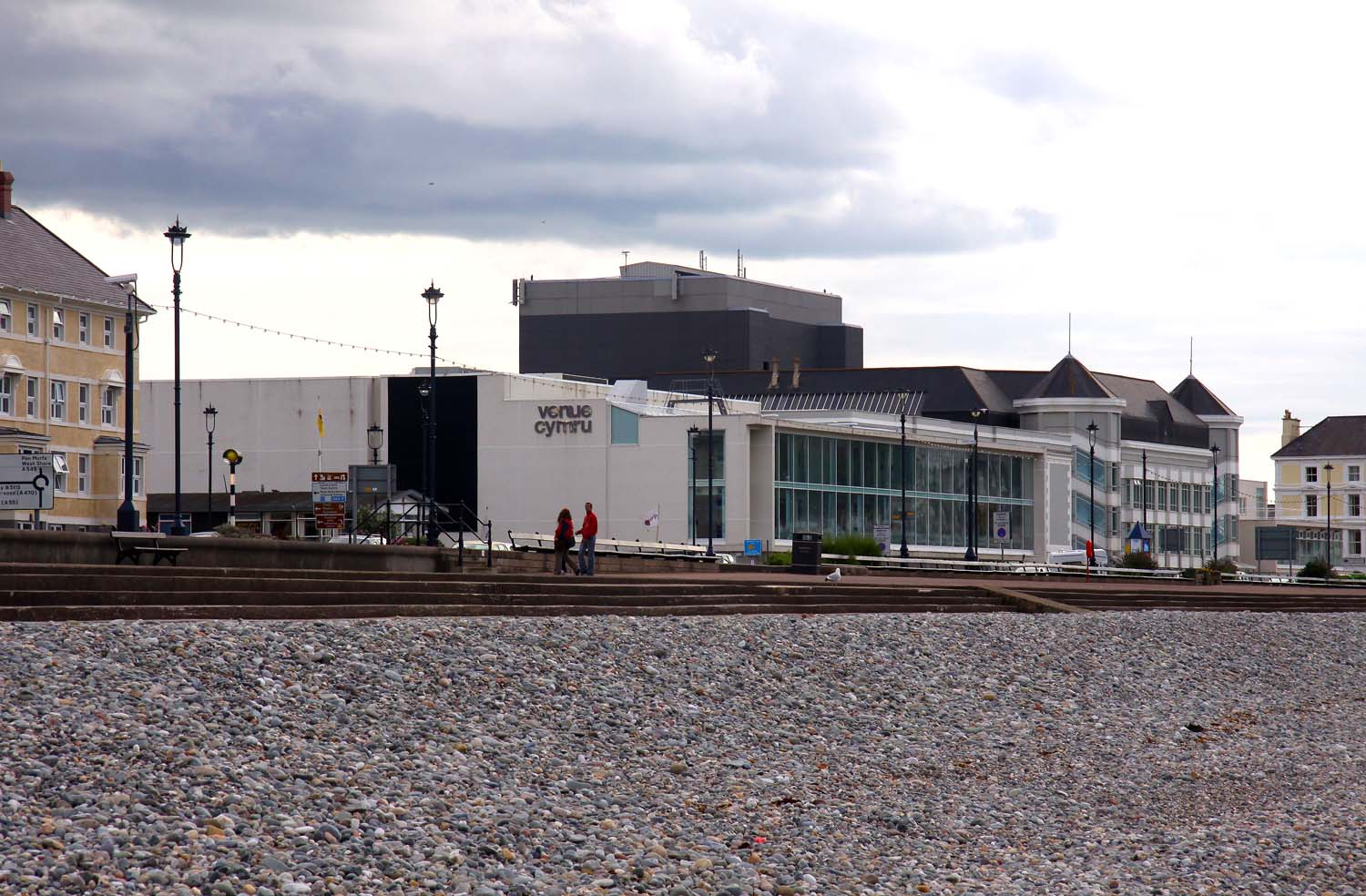
Ronnie O'Sullivan won the inaugural 2019 event, which was played at Venue Cymru in Llandudno, Wales.

The tournament was announced in April 2018, and was scheduled to be played for the first time in March 2019. The event was organised as the third and final event to make up the Coral Cup (now Players Series), tournaments sponsored by bookmakers Coral which use the rankings exclusively from the season prior. The tournaments in the Cup featured declining player entries, with the first event, the World Grand Prix having 32 participants, the Players Championship 16, and the Tour Championship 8. The tournament was broadcast by ITV4 in the United Kingdom. The event also airs on Sky Sport in New Zealand, NowTV in Hong Kong, and Superstars Online in China.

The first edition of the tournament was played in 2019 at Venue Cymru in Llandudno, Wales after the Players Championship was moved from Llandudno to Preston in 2019. The 2019 Tour Championship was the first event since the 2010 UK Championship (and other than the World Snooker Championship) in which every match was played over multiple sessions, with two in the quarter-finals and semi-finals, and three sessions in the final. The best-of-25-frames final, held on 23 and 24 March, was the first non-World Championship match of this length or longer since the 1992 UK Championship final. The 2019 final was played between Ronnie O'Sullivan and Neil Robertson, who had also met in the Players Championship final two weeks prior. O'Sullivan lead 5–3 after the first session and later won the match and the tournament 13–11. The win also gave O'Sullivan the Coral Cup for the 2018–19 season.

The 2020 Tour Championship was moved in both date and location due to the COVID-19 pandemic. Matches were also shortened with all matches being either best-of-17 or best-of-19 frame matches. It was originally organised to be played from 17 to 22 March 2020 but on the morning of the first day, it was postponed. On 5 June 2020, the tournament was rescheduled to be held between 20 and 26 June 2020 and moved to a different venue, the Marshall Arena in Milton Keynes, England. Due to the pandemic, Ding Junhui was unable to participate, and was replaced by Stephen Maguire. Maguire reached the final, where he defeated Mark Allen 10–6 in the final, to win his first ranking title since the 2013 Welsh Open.

The 2021 event was also held with no live audience but was held at the Celtic Manor Resort in Newport, Wales with all matches as the best-of-19 frames. Defending champion Maguire did not qualify for the event, having not scored enough ranking points during the season. The final was between the two players who contested the 2019 event, Robertson and O'Sullivan. Robertson won the event with a 10–4 win in the final. O'Sullivan commented he could not compete with Robertson's performance, saying "I've never seen anyone play as well as that."

The tournament, along with the other tournaments in the Players Series, was sponsored by Duelbits in 2023. Johnstone's Paint sponsored the 2024 event.

== Winners ==
Year	Winner	Runner-up	Final score	Venue	City	Season
2019	Ronnie O'Sullivan (ENG)	Neil Robertson (AUS)	13–11	Venue Cymru	Llandudno, Wales	2018/19
2020	Stephen Maguire (SCO)	Mark Allen (NIR)	10–6	Marshall Arena	Milton Keynes, England	2019/20
2021	Neil Robertson (AUS)	Ronnie O'Sullivan (ENG)	10–4	Celtic Manor Resort	Newport, Wales	2020/21
2022	Neil Robertson (AUS)	John Higgins (SCO)	10–9	Venue Cymru	Llandudno, Wales	2021/22
2023	Shaun Murphy (ENG)	Kyren Wilson (ENG)	10–7	Bonus Arena	Hull, England	2022/23
2024	Mark Williams (WAL)	Ronnie O'Sullivan (ENG)	10–5	Manchester Central	Manchester, England	2023/24
2025	John Higgins (SCO)	Mark Selby (ENG)	10–8	Manchester Central	Manchester, England	2024/25
2026	Zhao Xintong (CHN)	Judd Trump (ENG)	10–3	Manchester Central	Manchester, England	2025/26
2027				Manchester Central	Manchester, England	2026/27

== Finalists ==
Name	Nationality	Winner	Runner-up	Finals
Neil Robertson	Australia	2	1	3
Ronnie O'Sullivan	England	1	2	3
John Higgins	Scotland	1	1	2
Stephen Maguire	Scotland	1	0	1
Shaun Murphy	England	1	0	1
Mark Williams	Wales	1	0	1
Zhao Xintong	China	1	0	1
Judd Trump	England	0	1	1
Mark Allen	Northern Ireland	0	1	1
Kyren Wilson	England	0	1	1
Mark Selby	England	0	1	1

Legend
The names of active players are marked in **bold**.
