= World Grand Prix (snooker) =

Snooker tournament

- Part of the Players Series

Tournament information
- Venue: Kai Tak Sports Park
- Location: Kowloon City
- Country: Hong Kong
- Established: 2015
- Organisation(s): World Snooker Tour
- Format: Ranking event
- Total prize fund: £700,000
- Winner's share: £180,000
- Recent edition: 2026
- Current champion: Zhao Xintong (CHN)

The World Grand Prix is a professional ranking snooker tournament comprising the top 32 players on the one-year ranking list. After the inaugural 2015 edition was staged as a non-ranking event, the tournament became a ranking tournament the following year; the first two editions were staged at the Venue Cymru in Llandudno, Wales. In 2019, the World Grand Prix became one of three tournaments in the Players Series, together with the Players Championship and the Tour Championship. Held at various venues in England between 2017 and 2024, the tournament moved to Hong Kong in 2025, the first time it was staged outside the United Kingdom.

Ronnie O'Sullivan and Judd Trump are the most successful players in the event's history, each having won the title three times. The highest break in the tournament's history is a 146 by Trump at the 2025 event. The reigning champion is Zhao Xintong.

== History ==
The World Grand Prix was held as a non-ranking event in March 2015 in Llandudno, Wales, for the top 32 players on the World Grand Prix list. The list was based on a one-year ranking system. From 2016, the World Grand Prix has been held as a ranking event. In 2019, the tournament was included in the newly created Coral Cup, and branded as "Coral World Grand Prix". The sponsor changed to Cazoo in 2021, then to Duelbits in 2023. The series was renamed the Players Series in 2021.

Starting from the 2025 edition, the first two rounds will be played as best-of-nine frames matches with four tables in use in those two rounds, instead of the previous format with best-of-seven frames on two tables and a roll-on roll-off schedule. The previous format, where best of sevens were used in the opening rounds, was a legacy of the tournament being played in the United Kingdom on ITV, who had already ceased to be a broadcaster of the tournament when it moved to Hong Kong in 2024.

=== Trophy ===
The winner of the World Grand Prix receives a silver spouted vase, with the design identical to the Grand Prix trophy used from 1997 to 2000.

== Winners ==
Year	Winner	Runner-up	Final score	Venue	City	Season
World Grand Prix (non-ranking, 2015)
2015	Judd Trump (ENG)	Ronnie O'Sullivan (ENG)	10–7	Venue Cymru	Llandudno, Wales	2014/15
World Grand Prix (ranking, 2016–present)
2016	Shaun Murphy (ENG)	Stuart Bingham (ENG)	10–9	Venue Cymru	Llandudno, Wales	2015/16
2017	Barry Hawkins (ENG)	Ryan Day (WAL)	10–7	Preston Guild Hall	Preston, England	2016/17
2018	Ronnie O'Sullivan (ENG)	Ding Junhui (CHN)	10–3	Preston Guild Hall	Preston, England	2017/18
2019	Judd Trump (ENG)	Ali Carter (ENG)	10–6	The Centaur	Cheltenham, England	2018/19
2020 (Feb)	Neil Robertson (AUS)	Graeme Dott (SCO)	10–8	The Centaur	Cheltenham, England	2019/20
2020 (Dec)	Judd Trump (ENG)	Jack Lisowski (ENG)	10–7	Marshall Arena	Milton Keynes, England	2020/21
2021	Ronnie O'Sullivan (ENG)	Neil Robertson (AUS)	10–8	Coventry Arena	Coventry, England	2021/22
2023	Mark Allen (NIR)	Judd Trump (ENG)	10–9	The Centaur	Cheltenham, England	2022/23
2024	Ronnie O'Sullivan (ENG)	Judd Trump (ENG)	10–7	Morningside Arena	Leicester, England	2023/24
2025	Neil Robertson (AUS)	Stuart Bingham (ENG)	10–0	Kai Tak Sports Park	Kowloon, Hong Kong	2024/25
2026	Zhao Xintong (CHN)	Zhang Anda (CHN)	10–6	Kai Tak Sports Park	Kowloon, Hong Kong	2025/26
2027				Kai Tak Sports Park	Kowloon, Hong Kong	2026/27

== Finalists ==
Name	Nationality	Winner	Runner-up	Finals
**Judd Trump**	England	3	2	5
**Ronnie O'Sullivan**	England	3	1	4
**Neil Robertson**	Australia	2	1	3
**Shaun Murphy**	England	1	0	1
**Barry Hawkins**	England	1	0	1
**Mark Allen**	Northern Ireland	1	0	1
**Zhao Xintong**	China	1	0	1
**Stuart Bingham**	England	0	2	2
**Ryan Day**	Wales	0	1	1
**Ding Junhui**	China	0	1	1
**Ali Carter**	England	0	1	1
Graeme Dott	Scotland	0	1	1
**Jack Lisowski**	England	0	1	1
**Zhang Anda**	China	0	1	1

Legend
The names of active players are marked in **bold**.
