= Players Series =

Snooker series of tournaments

Tournament information
- Location: Kowloon City; Telford; Manchester
- Country: United Kingdom; Hong Kong
- Established: 2019; 7 years ago
- Organisation(s): World Snooker Tour
- Format: 3 ranking events
- Total prize fund: £700,000 (World Grand Prix) £500,000 (Players & Tour Champ)
- Winner's share: £180,000 (World Grand Prix) £150,000 (Players & Tour Champ)
- Recent edition: 2025–26
- Current champion: Zhao Xintong (CHN)

The Players Series is a series of ranking bonus tournaments organised by the World Snooker Tour for players who have earned the most money in professional snooker tournaments within the season. Unlike traditional ranking events, qualification is based on results from the single-season list, rather than by world rankings.

First established in 2019, the series includes the pre-existing World Grand Prix and Players Championship with the addition of the Tour Championship; the number of competitors for each event decreases, with 32 players participating in the Grand Prix, 16 in the Players and 12 in the Tour Championship. Zhao Xintong is the current series champion, being the first player to win all three tournaments within the same season.

== Overview ==
Upon the establishment of the series, it was initially sponsored by the betting firm Coral and was called the Coral Cup, with the World Grand Prix and Players Championship held in England and the Tour Championship in Wales. In the 2019–2020 season, the player who earned the most prize money across all three events in the series was awarded a prize fund of £100,000 and the "Coral Cup" trophy. Due to the COVID-19 pandemic and Coral ceasing its involvement in sponsoring snooker events, the bonus was discontinued. The only winner of the additional monetary bonus was Stephen Maguire, with most of the earnings coming from the Tour Championship.

From the 2021–22 season, players who lost in the first round of any of the series events received ranking points equal to their prize money. This was a change from previous incarnations where losing in the first round gave prize money only and no ranking points. However, should a player qualify for one of the events in the series, but does not play their opening match, the player receives neither prize money nor ranking points.

In the 2020–21 and 2021–22 seasons, it was sponsored by Cazoo and named the Cazoo Series. However, the sponsorship was abruptly stopped as a result of its own financial issues that led it to pull out from a number of sports sponsorship deals, including snooker. In the 2022–23 season, it was sponsored by crypto casino Duelbits as the Duelbits Series; it was only announced on the day of the 2023 World Grand Prix commencing. It is also the first time all tournaments in the series were played in England with the Tour Championship leaving Wales (bar the 2020 edition behind closed doors due to the COVID-19 pandemic).

Beginning with the 2024–25 season, the World Grand Prix was played in Hong Kong in an effort to expand the series overseas.

List of Players Series winners
Season	Series winner	Aggregate winnings	Bonus prize	Ref.
2018–19	Ronnie O'Sullivan (ENG)	£280,000		
2019–20	Stephen Maguire (SCO)	£185,000	£100,000	
2020–21	Neil Robertson (AUS)	£170,000		
2021–22	Neil Robertson (AUS)	£315,000		
2022–23	Shaun Murphy (ENG)	£295,000		
2023–24	Ronnie O'Sullivan (ENG)	£265,000		
2024–25	Neil Robertson (AUS)	£230,000		
2025–26	Zhao Xintong (CHN)	£480,000		

== Event winners ==
Season	Tournament	Winner	Runner-up	Score	City	Refs
Coral Cup
2018–19	World Grand Prix	Judd Trump (ENG)	Ali Carter (ENG)	10–6	Cheltenham	
2018–19	Players Championship	Ronnie O'Sullivan (ENG)	Neil Robertson (AUS)	10–4	Preston	
2018–19	Tour Championship	Ronnie O'Sullivan (ENG)	Neil Robertson (AUS)	13–11	Llandudno	
2019–20	World Grand Prix	Neil Robertson (AUS)	Graeme Dott (SCO)	10–8	Cheltenham	
2019–20	Players Championship	Judd Trump (ENG)	Yan Bingtao (CHN)	10–4	Southport	
2019–20	Tour Championship	Stephen Maguire (SCO)	Mark Allen (NIR)	10–6	Milton Keynes	
Cazoo Series
2020–21	World Grand Prix	Judd Trump (ENG)	Jack Lisowski (ENG)	10–7	Milton Keynes	
2020–21	Players Championship	John Higgins (SCO)	Ronnie O'Sullivan (ENG)	10–3	Milton Keynes	
2020–21	Tour Championship	Neil Robertson (AUS)	Ronnie O'Sullivan (ENG)	10–4	Newport	
2021–22	World Grand Prix	Ronnie O'Sullivan (ENG)	Neil Robertson (AUS)	10–8	Coventry	
2021–22	Players Championship	Neil Robertson (AUS)	Barry Hawkins (ENG)	10–5	Wolverhampton	
2021–22	Tour Championship	Neil Robertson (AUS)	John Higgins (SCO)	10–9	Llandudno	
Duelbits Series
2022–23	World Grand Prix	Mark Allen (NIR)	Judd Trump (ENG)	10–9	Cheltenham	
2022–23	Players Championship	Shaun Murphy (ENG)	Ali Carter (ENG)	10–4	Wolverhampton	
2022–23	Tour Championship	Shaun Murphy (ENG)	Kyren Wilson (ENG)	10–7	Hull	
Players Series
2023–24	World Grand Prix	Ronnie O'Sullivan (ENG)	Judd Trump (ENG)	10–7	Leicester	
2023–24	Players Championship	Mark Allen (NIR)	Zhang Anda (CHN)	10–8	Telford	
2023–24	Tour Championship	Mark Williams (WAL)	Ronnie O'Sullivan (ENG)	10–5	Manchester	
2024–25	World Grand Prix	Neil Robertson (AUS)	Stuart Bingham (ENG)	10–0	Hong Kong	
2024–25	Players Championship	Kyren Wilson (ENG)	Judd Trump (ENG)	10–9	Telford	
2024–25	Tour Championship	John Higgins (SCO)	Mark Selby (ENG)	10–8	Manchester	
2025–26	World Grand Prix	Zhao Xintong (CHN)	Zhang Anda (CHN)	10–6	Hong Kong	
2025–26	Players Championship	Zhao Xintong (CHN)	John Higgins (SCO)	10–7	Telford	
2025–26	Tour Championship	Zhao Xintong (CHN)	Judd Trump (ENG)	10–3	Manchester	
2026–27	World Grand Prix				Hong Kong	
2026–27	Players Championship				Telford	
2026–27	Tour Championship				Manchester	

== Statistics ==
=== Tournament wins ===
Player	Total	World Grand Prix	Players Championship	Tour Championship	Winning span
(Australia) Neil Robertson	5	2	1	2	2020–2025
(England) Ronnie O'Sullivan	4	2	1	1	2019–2024
(China) Zhao Xintong	3	1	1	1	2026
(England) Judd Trump	3	2	1	0	2019–2020
(England) Shaun Murphy	2	0	1	1	2023
(Northern Ireland) Mark Allen	2	1	1	0	2023–2024
(Scotland) John Higgins	2	0	1	1	2021–2025
(Scotland) Stephen Maguire	1	0	0	1	2020
(Wales) Mark Williams	1	0	0	1	2024
(England) Kyren Wilson	1	0	1	0	2025
Total events	24	8	8	8	2019–2026
