= 2023 World Grand Prix (snooker) =

Snooker tournament

2023 Duelbits World Grand Prix
Tournament information
- Dates: 16–22 January 2023
- Venue: The Centaur
- City: Cheltenham
- Country: England
- Organisation: World Snooker Tour
- Format: Ranking event
- Total prize fund: £380,000
- Winner's share: £100,000
- Highest break: Mark Allen (NIR) (141)

Final
- Champion: Mark Allen (NIR)
- Runner-up: Judd Trump (ENG)
- Score: 10–9

The 2023 World Grand Prix (officially the 2023 Duelbits World Grand Prix) was a professional snooker tournament that took place from 16 to 22 January 2023 at The Centaur in Cheltenham, England. The eighth ranking event of the 2022–23 snooker season, it preceded the 2023 Players Championship and the 2023 Tour Championship as the first of three events in the Players Series. Sponsored for the first time by cryptocurrency casino Duelbits, the tournament was broadcast by ITV domestically, by Eurosport in Europe, and by Matchroom Sport and other broadcasters internationally. The winner received £100,000 from a total prize fund of £380,000.

The participants were the top 32 players on the one-year ranking list as it stood after the 2022 English Open. Lu Ning was ineligible to compete after the sport's governing body suspended him amid a match-fixing investigation; his place went to David Gilbert. Four-time world champion John Higgins failed to qualify after finishing at 54th place on the one-year list following the English Open.

The defending champion was Ronnie O'Sullivan, who defeated Neil Robertson 10–8 in the previous season's final. However, O'Sullivan lost 2–4 to Noppon Saengkham in the last 16. Facing Judd Trump in the final, Mark Allen won five consecutive frames to lead 7–2, but Trump won six of the next seven to tie the scores at 8–8. The match went to a deciding frame, where Allen clinched a 10–9 victory to win his ninth ranking title. It was Allen's third ranking tournament win of the season, following the 2022 Northern Ireland Open and 2022 UK Championship, and took him to a career-high of number three in the world rankings. Allen made the tournament's highest break of 141 in the 12th frame of the final.

== Prize fund ==
The breakdown of prize money for the event is shown below:

- Winner: £100,000
- Runner-up: £40,000
- Semi-final: £20,000
- Quarter-final: £12,500
- Last 16: £7,500
- Last 32: £5,000
- Highest break: £10,000
- Total: £380,000

== Seeding list ==
The top 32 players on the one-year ranking list, up to and including the 2022 English Open, qualified for the tournament. Seedings were based on the order of the players in that list.

The rankings are given below.

Seed	Player	Total points
1	Mark Allen (NIR)	402,000
2	Ryan Day (WAL)	136,500
3	Kyren Wilson (ENG)	120,000
4	Ding Junhui (CHN)	117,000
5	Mark Selby (ENG)	116,000
6	Gary Wilson (ENG)	98,500
7	Luca Brecel (BEL)	93,500
8	Jack Lisowski (ENG)	75,500
9	Zhou Yuelong (CHN)	70,000
10	Judd Trump (ENG)	61,000
11	Tom Ford (ENG)	59,500
12	Barry Hawkins (ENG)	58,500
13	Mark Williams (WAL)	55,000
14	Shaun Murphy (ENG)	53,500
15	Neil Robertson (AUS)	52,500
16	Joe O'Connor (ENG)	49,000
17	Lyu Haotian (CHN)	47,000
18	Xiao Guodong (CHN)	45,500
19	Ali Carter (ENG)	44,500
20	Jamie Jones (WAL)	44,000
21	Ronnie O'Sullivan (ENG)	42,000
22	Sam Craigie (ENG)	39,500
23	Hossein Vafaei (IRN)	39,000
24	Thepchaiya Un-Nooh (THA)	38,000
25	Robert Milkins (ENG)	36,500
26	Joe Perry (ENG)	36,500
27	Anthony McGill (SCO)	35,500
28	Noppon Saengkham (THA)	35,500
29	Stuart Bingham (ENG)	34,500
30	Robbie Williams (ENG)	32,500
31	Ricky Walden (ENG)	31,000
32	David Gilbert (ENG)	31,000

== Tournament draw ==
Last 32; Best of 7 frames
1	(Northern Ireland) Mark Allen	4
32	(England) David Gilbert	2
16	(England) Joe O'Connor	4
17	(China) Lyu Haotian	2
9	(China) Zhou Yuelong	4
24	(Thailand) Thepchaiya Un-Nooh	3
8	(England) Jack Lisowski	4
25	(England) Robert Milkins	3
5	(England) Mark Selby	1
28	(Thailand) Noppon Saengkham	4
12	(England) Barry Hawkins	0
21	(England) Ronnie O'Sullivan	4
13	(Wales) Mark Williams	4
20	(Wales) Jamie Jones	1
4	(China) Ding Junhui	4
29	(England) Stuart Bingham	0
3	(England) Kyren Wilson	4
30	(England) Robbie Williams	2
14	(England) Shaun Murphy	4
19	(England) Ali Carter	0
11	(England) Tom Ford	2
22	(England) Sam Craigie	4
6	(England) Gary Wilson	1
27	(Scotland) Anthony McGill	4
7	(Belgium) Luca Brecel	4
26	(England) Joe Perry	1
10	(England) Judd Trump	4
23	(Iran) Hossein Vafaei	2
15	(Australia) Neil Robertson	1
18	(China) Xiao Guodong	4
2	(Wales) Ryan Day	4
31	(England) Ricky Walden	1

Last 16; Best of 7 frames
1	(Northern Ireland) Mark Allen	4
16	(England) Joe O'Connor	3
9	(China) Zhou Yuelong	2
8	(England) Jack Lisowski	4
28	(Thailand) Noppon Saengkham	4
21	(England) Ronnie O'Sullivan	2
13	(Wales) Mark Williams	4
4	(China) Ding Junhui	0
3	(England) Kyren Wilson	2
14	(England) Shaun Murphy	4
22	(England) Sam Craigie	0
27	(Scotland) Anthony McGill	4
7	(Belgium) Luca Brecel	0
10	(England) Judd Trump	4
18	(China) Xiao Guodong	4
2	(Wales) Ryan Day	1

Quarter-finals; Best of 9 frames
1	(Northern Ireland) Mark Allen	5
8	(England) Jack Lisowski	4
28	(Thailand) Noppon Saengkham	5
13	(Wales) Mark Williams	3
14	(England) Shaun Murphy	5
27	(Scotland) Anthony McGill	4
10	(England) Judd Trump	5
18	(China) Xiao Guodong	3

Semi-finals; Best of 11 frames
1	(Northern Ireland) Mark Allen	6
28	(Thailand) Noppon Saengkham	1
14	(England) Shaun Murphy	2
10	(England) Judd Trump	6

Final; Best of 19 frames
1	(Northern Ireland) Mark Allen	10
10	(England) Judd Trump	9

=== Final ===
Final: Best of 19 frames. Referee: Brendan Moore; The Centaur, Cheltenham, England, 22 January 2023
Mark Allen (1); Northern Ireland	10–9	Judd Trump (10); England
Afternoon: 58–22, 33–68, 0–74, 71–31, 89–25, 63–28, 83–9, 123–0; Evening: 88–0, 0–140 (140), 30–108 (108), 141–0 (141), 0–91, 41–87, 11–79, 1–93, 65–27, 0–76, 60–19
141	Highest break	140
1	Century breaks	2

== Century breaks ==
A total of 30 century breaks were made during the tournament.

- 141, 133, 127, 105 – Mark Allen
- 140, 138, 117, 112, 108, 107 – Judd Trump
- 140, 100 – Shaun Murphy
- 133 – Ding Junhui
- 131, 108, 102 – Anthony McGill
- 122, 104 – Noppon Saengkham
- 121, 104, 100 – Mark Williams
- 117 – Joe O'Connor
- 113, 107 – Sam Craigie
- 109 – Neil Robertson
- 108 – Ronnie O'Sullivan
- 107, 104 – Zhou Yuelong
- 102 – Jack Lisowski
- 101 – Ryan Day
