= 2022 Tour Championship =

Snooker tournament

2022 Cazoo Tour Championship
Tournament information
- Dates: 28 March – 3 April 2022
- Venue: Venue Cymru
- City: Llandudno
- Country: Wales
- Organisation: World Snooker Tour
- Format: Ranking event
- Total prize fund: £370,000
- Winner's share: £150,000
- Highest break: Judd Trump (ENG) (140)

Final
- Champion: Neil Robertson (AUS)
- Runner-up: John Higgins (SCO)
- Score: 10–9

The 2022 Tour Championship (officially the 2022 Cazoo Tour Championship) was a professional snooker tournament that took place from 28 March to 3 April 2022 at Venue Cymru in Llandudno, Wales. Organised by the World Snooker Tour, it comprised the top eight players on the one-year ranking list. It was the fourth edition of the Tour Championship, first held in 2019, and the 15th and penultimate ranking event of the 2021–22 snooker season, following the Gibraltar Open and preceding the World Championship. It was the third and final event of the season's Cazoo Series, following the Players Championship and the World Grand Prix. Broadcast by ITV4 in the United Kingdom, the event featured a prize fund of £370,000, of which the winner received £150,000.

The defending champion was Neil Robertson, who had defeated Ronnie O'Sullivan 10–4 in the 2021 final. Robertson retained his title, coming from 4–9 behind in the final to defeat John Higgins 10–9 and win his 23rd ranking tournament, putting him level with Judd Trump at sixth place on the all-time list of ranking event winners. Robertson also won the season's Cazoo Cup, while Higgins lost his fifth final of the season.

The event produced 33 century breaks, the highest being a 140 by Trump. O'Sullivan made five century breaks in both his quarter-final and semi-final matches, becoming the first player to make five centuries in each of two consecutive matches.

== Format ==
The 2022 Tour Championship (officially the 2022 Cazoo Tour Championship) was the third and final event in the 2021–22 Cazoo Cup series, first introduced in the 2018–19 snooker season; the other events in the series were the World Grand Prix and the Players Championship. Organised by the World Snooker Tour, it was the 15th and penultimate ranking event of the 2021–22 snooker season, following the Gibraltar Open and preceding the World Championship. The Tour Championship featured the top eight players from the one-year ranking list taking part in a single-elimination tournament. All matches were played as the best of 19 frames.

The event took place at Venue Cymru in Llandudno, Wales, between 28 March and 3 April 2022. Broadcast by ITV4 in the United Kingdom, it was sponsored by car retailer Cazoo. The defending champion was Neil Robertson, who won the 2021 event, defeating Ronnie O'Sullivan 10–4 in the final.

=== Qualification ===
The participants were determined by the points won in the ranking tournaments preceding the Tour Championship, from the 2021 Championship League to the Gibraltar Open.

Seed	Player	Total Points
1	Zhao Xintong (CHN)	£311,500
2	Neil Robertson (AUS)	£261,000
3	Ronnie O'Sullivan (ENG)	£232,500
4	Judd Trump (ENG)	£216,000
5	Luca Brecel (BEL)	£205,500
6	Mark Williams (WAL)	£166,500
7	Mark Allen (NIR)	£160,000
8	John Higgins (SCO)	£147,500

=== Prize fund ===
The total prize fund for the event was £370,000, the winner receiving £150,000. A breakdown of the prize money for the event is shown below:

- Winner: £150,000
- Runner-up: £60,000
- Semi-final: £40,000
- Quarter-final: £20,000
- Highest break: £10,000
- Total: £370,000

== Summary ==
=== Quarter-finals ===
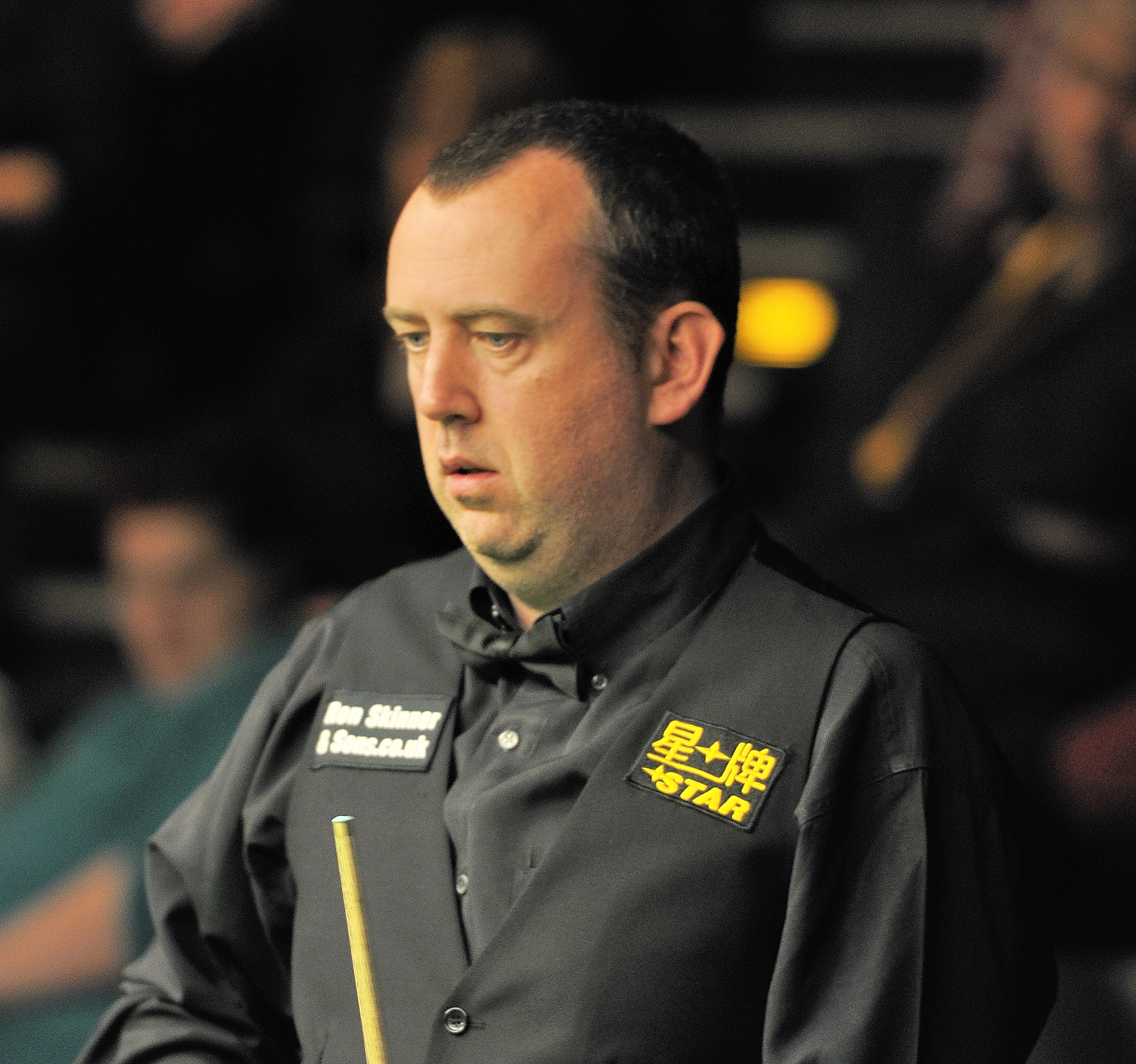
Mark Williams (pictured in 2014) lost 9–10 to Ronnie O'Sullivan, the match praised for its quality by players and pundits.

The quarter-finals were held between 28 and 31 March. Zhao Xintong, who had won the UK Championship and German Masters earlier in the season, was making his first appearance at the Tour Championship. He played John Higgins, who narrowly qualified for the tournament after Ricky Walden was unable to win enough points during the Gibraltar Open. Zhao won four consecutive frames, making two centuries of 108 and 124, to take a 5–2 lead, but Higgins won the last frame of the session. In the second session, Zhao won three of the first four frames to move 8–4 ahead, but he scored just 53 points across the next four frames as Higgins drew level at 8–8. Higgins won the 17th to take a 9–8 lead, but Zhao won the 18th to set up a decider. Higgins clinched a 10–9 victory after Zhao missed a four-ball plant. In all, Higgins won six of the last seven frames. Afterward, he called coming from behind to beat Zhao "one of my best wins ever".

In the second quarter-final, the season's English Open and Players Championship winner Robertson faced the Northern Ireland Open champion Mark Allen. Robertson took a 7–0 lead. Allen scored just 55 points in the first seven frames, but avoided a session whitewash by winning the eighth frame. In the evening session, Allen won five of the first six, before Robertson produced back-to-back centuries of 121 and 130 to win the match 10–6. Afterward, Robertson stated that the match had reassured him he could respond strongly against a comeback.

In the third quarter-final, O'Sullivan faced Mark Williams, who had not defeated O'Sullivan in a two-session ranking match since the semi-finals of the 2000 UK Championship. Williams won the 29-minute opening frame, but O'Sullivan then won three consecutive frames, making a 131 break in the fourth, to lead 3–1 at the mid-session interval. Williams won the fifth, but O'Sullivan made a 128 break to take the sixth. O'Sullivan led by 50 points in the seventh, but Williams made a 92 clearance to win the frame. O'Sullivan took the last frame of the session with an 89 break to lead 5–3. Williams began the evening session with a 103 break, but O'Sullivan responded with a 100 in the tenth. Williams made an 89 break to win the 11th, but O'Sullivan took the 12th with a 75 to lead 7–5. Williams won two consecutive frames after the mid-session interval to level at 7–7, and then took a 24-point lead in the 15th before accidentally potting the pink ball when cannoning into the pack of red balls. O'Sullivan restored his lead at 8–7 with a 106 break. Williams leveled again at 8–8, but O'Sullivan made a 127 in the 17th frame, his fifth century of the match, to lead 9–8. Williams fell 47 points behind in the penultimate frame but won it on the colours to force a decider. Both players had chances, but O'Sullivan clinched the match after Williams missed a long pot on the final red. The quality of the match was widely praised; media called it a "classic", an "epic", and a "thriller". O'Sullivan stated: "It is probably the best he has ever played against me and the best I've ever played against him". Williams responded that he enjoyed the quality of the match but said "I could and should have won".

In the last quarter-final, Judd Trump faced Luca Brecel. Brecel was making his debut in the Tour Championship. Trump had entered the top eight on the season's money list by winning the Turkish Masters earlier that month; Brecel had been runner-up at the UK Championship and won the Scottish Open earlier in the season. Brecel won six of the first eight frames, making a century and four other half-century breaks in the first session; Trump made just one break over 50. The first four frames of the evening session were shared. Trump then made back-to-back centuries of 140 (the tournament's highest break) and 103, but Brecel won the next two to clinch a 10–6 win. It was Brecel's first victory over Trump in a ranking event, and only his second victory over Trump in ten meetings.

=== Semi-finals ===
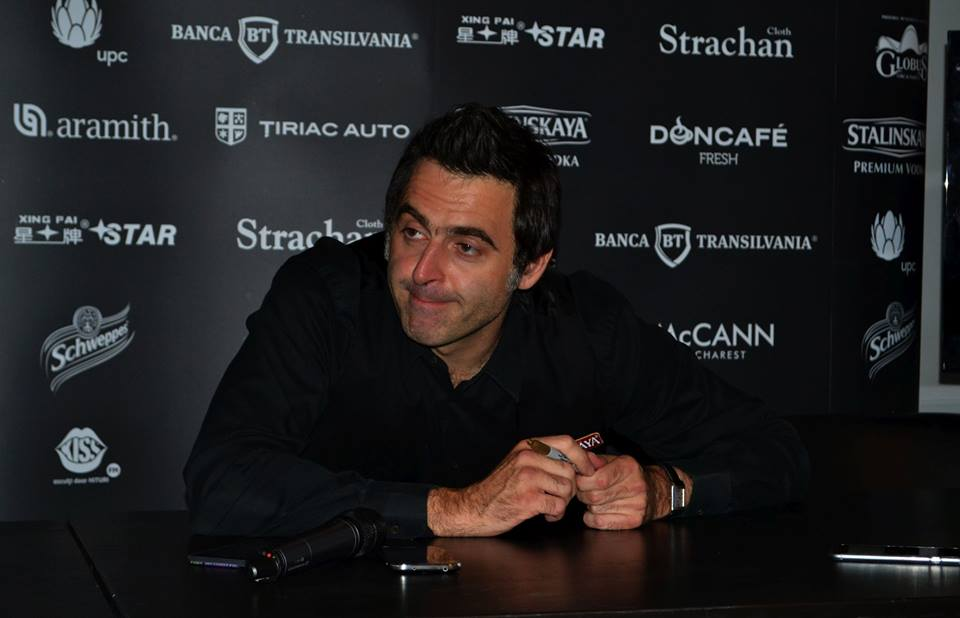
Ronnie O'Sullivan (pictured in 2016) became the first person to make five century breaks in consecutive matches.

The semi-finals were held on 1 and 2 April. O'Sullivan faced Robertson in a match that reprised the 2019 and 2021 finals. Robertson made a 115 break in the opening frame, but O'Sullivan won four consecutive frames with breaks of 125, 90, 106 and 128 to take a 4–1 lead. Robertson won the last three frames of the session to tie the scores at 4–4. O'Sullivan won the first frame of the second session, before Robertson won the next three to lead 7–5. O'Sullivan won three of the next four to tie the match at 8–8. O'Sullivan went ahead with a 112 break in the next frame, his fifth century of the match, but Robertson won the final two frames to clinch the match 10–9, guaranteeing that he would win the Cazoo Cup, regardless of the outcome of the final, having won the Players Championship and been runner-up in the World Grand Prix, the other two Cazoo Series events. O'Sullivan became the first player to make five century breaks in two consecutive matches. The 19-frame match had only two frames without at least a half-century break. By reaching the semi-finals, O'Sullivan replaced Mark Selby as world number one after the event, although O'Sullivan called Robertson "the best player in the world".

In the second semi-final, Higgins played Brecel. The players had faced each other in the Scottish Open final earlier in the season, Brecel winning 9–5 on that occasion. Brecel won the first three frames, but Higgins responded with five frames in a row, ending with a century break of 108, to finish the first session with a 5–3 lead. Higgins moved 7–4 ahead in the evening session before Brecel won three frames in a row to level the scores at 7–7. Higgins responded by also winning three frames in a row, taking advantage of errors by Brecel, to win the match 10–7 and reach the 55th ranking final of his professional career.

=== Final ===
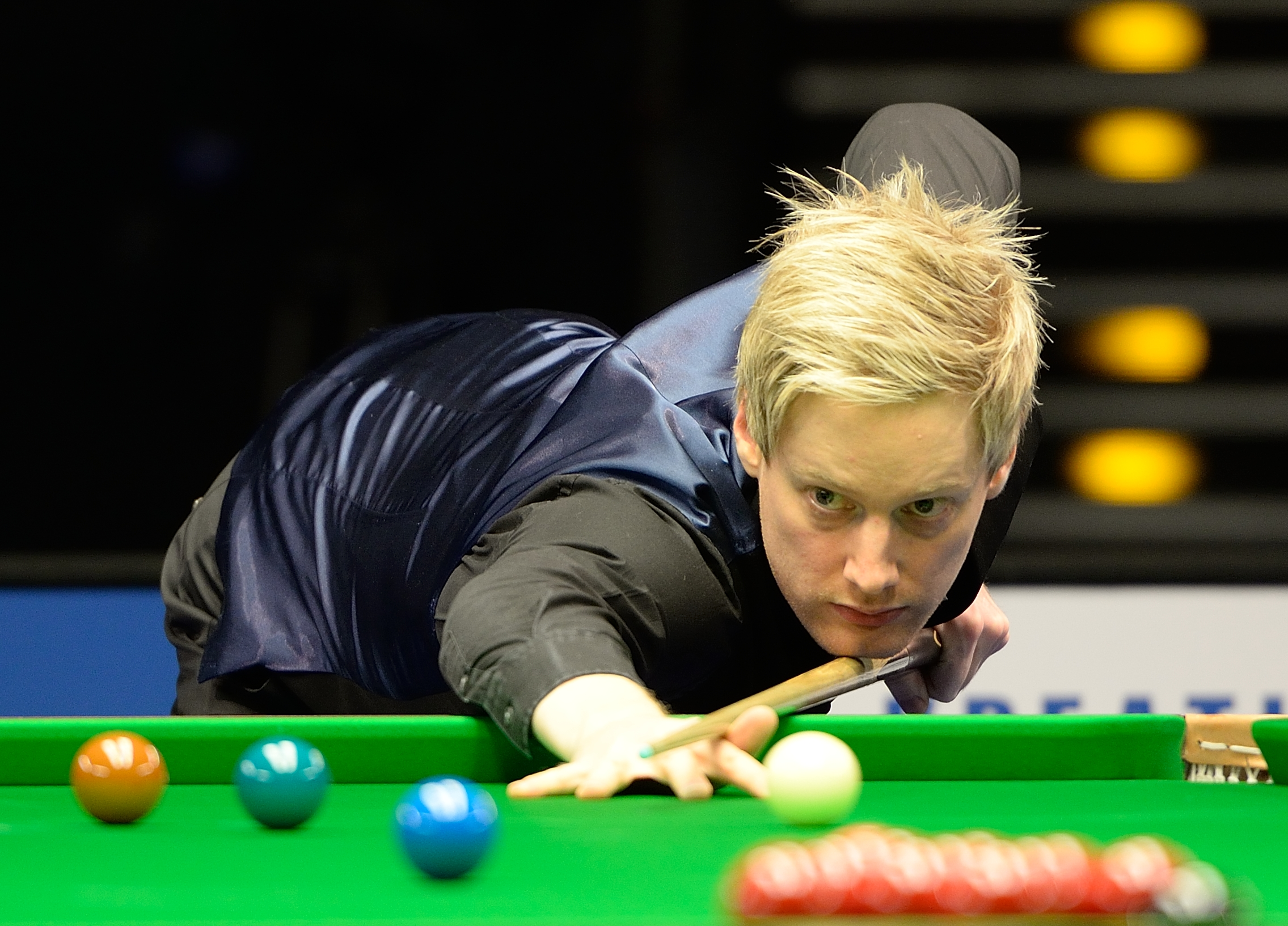
Neil Robertson won the event, defeating John Higgins in the final 10–9, despite having trailed 4–9.

The final took place on 3 April between Robertson and Higgins, as a best-of-19-frame match played over two sessions. The players met in a ranking final for the second time that season, Robertson having defeated Higgins 9–8 in the English Open final in November 2021. The first frame lasted over 50 minutes, the longest of the tournament, Higgins winning it on the final black ball. Higgins then made back-to-back century breaks of 136 and 126 to lead 3–0. Robertson responded with a 130 in the fourth and also won the fifth. In frame six, Robertson attempted a maximum break but missed the final blue ball. Higgins made his third century break of the match in frame seven, and also won frame eight with a break of 80 to lead 5–3. The players made five century breaks in the first eight frames.

In the evening session, Higgins won the first three frames to lead 8–3, before Robertson responded with a 91 to take frame 12. Higgins took the 13th with an 84 break, but Robertson came from 4–9 behind to win six consecutive frames and secure a 10–9 victory. The 23rd ranking title of Robertson's career, it put him level with Trump in sixth place on the all-time list of ranking event winners. Robertson called his win "the best comeback of my career". It was Higgins's fifth loss in a major final that season, following defeats at the English Open, Northern Ireland Open, Champion of Champions, and Scottish Open. It was also the third time in the season that Higgins had lost a ranking final after requiring just one frame for victory. He led 8–6 in both the English and Northern Ireland Opens, only to lose 8–9 each time.

== Tournament draw ==
The draw for the event is shown below. Players in bold denote match winners, with numbers to the left showing players seeding.

**Quarter-finals**; Best of 19 frames
1	Zhao Xintong (CHN)	9
**8**	**John Higgins (SCO)**	**10**
4	Judd Trump (ENG)	6
**5**	**Luca Brecel (BEL)**	**10**
**3**	**Ronnie O'Sullivan (ENG)**	**10**
6	Mark Williams (WAL)	9
**2**	**Neil Robertson (AUS)**	**10**
7	Mark Allen (NIR)	6

**Semi-finals**; Best of 19 frames
**8**	**(Scotland) John Higgins**	**10**
5	(Belgium) Luca Brecel	7
3	(England) Ronnie O'Sullivan	9
**2**	**(Australia) Neil Robertson**	**10**

**Final**; Best of 19 frames
8	(Scotland) John Higgins	9
**2**	**(Australia) Neil Robertson**	**10**

=== Final ===
The scores from the final are shown below. Scores in brackets are breaks made by players in each frame.

Final: Best of 19 frames. Referee: Brendan Moore; Venue Cymru, Llandudno, Wales, 3 April 2022
John Higgins (8); Scotland	9–**10**	**Neil Robertson** (2); Australia
Afternoon: **78**–77, **136**–0 (136), **138**–0 (126), 0–**130** (130), 47–**76**, 0–**129** (129), **127**–0 (127), **80**–0; Evening: **60**–41, **101**–0, **82**–5, 1–**91**, **84**–0, 37–**74**, 1–**119** (108), 35–**87**, 17–**91**, 0–**93**, 10–**72**
**136**	Highest break	130
3	Century breaks	3

== Century breaks ==
There were 33 century breaks made during the tournament.

- 140, 103 – Judd Trump
- 136, 127, 126, 108 – John Higgins
- 131, 128, 128, 127, 125, 112, 106, 106, 100, 100 – Ronnie O'Sullivan
- 130, 130, 129, 125, 125, 121, 117, 115, 108, 103 – Neil Robertson
- 128, 124, 108 – Zhao Xintong
- 108, 105, 100 – Luca Brecel
- 103 – Mark Williams

== Cazoo Series ==
The Cazoo Series features three events: the World Grand Prix, the Players Championship, and the Tour Championship. For all three events, qualification is based on players' rankings on the one-year ranking list. The top ten players in the Cazoo Cup series are shown below. Prizes in bold denote an event win.

Player	Total
Neil Robertson (AUS)	£315,000
Ronnie O'Sullivan (ENG)	£155,000
John Higgins (SCO)	£80,000
Luca Brecel (BEL)	£57,500
Barry Hawkins (ENG)	£55,000
Jimmy Robertson (ENG)	£42,500
Mark Williams (WAL)	£40,000
Mark Allen (NIR)	£37,500
Judd Trump (ENG)	£37,500
Zhao Xintong (CHN)	£35,000
