= 2022 Players Championship (snooker) =

2022 Cazoo Players Championship
Tournament information
- Dates: 7–13 February 2022
- Venue: Aldersley Leisure Village
- City: Wolverhampton
- Country: England
- Organisation: World Snooker Tour
- Format: Ranking event
- Total prize fund: £385,000
- Winner's share: £125,000
- Highest break: Kyren Wilson (ENG) (141)

Final
- Champion: Neil Robertson (AUS)
- Runner-up: Barry Hawkins (ENG)
- Score: 10–5

The 2022 Players Championship (officially the 2022 Cazoo Players Championship) was a professional ranking snooker tournament that took place from 7 to 13 February 2022 at Aldersley Leisure Village in Wolverhampton, England. It was the tenth ranking event of the 2021–22 season, and the second event of the Cazoo Cup, following the World Grand Prix and preceding the Tour Championship. It featured the top 16 ranked players on the one-year ranking list. The event was broadcast by ITV4 in the United Kingdom, and Eurosport in the rest of Europe.

Zhao Xintong and Hossein Vafaei made their debuts in the event, with Zhao seeded number one after winning the 2021 UK Championship and the 2022 German Masters. Both debutants lost in the first round, with Barry Hawkins defeating Zhao 6–3 and John Higgins beating Vafaei by the same score.

Higgins was the defending champion, having beaten Ronnie O'Sullivan 10–3 in the 2021 final. However, Higgins lost 4–6 to Jimmy Robertson in the quarter-finals. The final was contested between Hawkins, who had previously won the tournament in 2014, and Neil Robertson, who had been runner-up in 2012, 2013, and 2019. Robertson defeated Hawkins 10–5 in a final that featured five century breaks, four by Robertson and a 137 by Hawkins. It was Robertson's first Players Championship title, the 22nd ranking title of his career, and his third tournament win of the season, following the 2021 English Open and the 2022 Masters.

== Prize fund ==
The breakdown of prize money for the event is shown below:

- Winner: £125,000
- Runner-up: £50,000
- Semi-final: £30,000
- Quarter-final: £15,000
- Last 16: £10,000
- Highest break: £10,000
- Total: £385,000

== Seeding list ==
The seedings for the tournament were based on the one-year ranking list up to and including the 2022 German Masters.

Seed	Player	Total points
1	Zhao Xintong (CHN)	291,000
2	Luca Brecel (BEL)	183,000
3	Ronnie O'Sullivan (ENG)	175,000
4	Mark Williams (WAL)	145,000
5	Mark Allen (NIR)	139,500
6	Neil Robertson (AUS)	118,000
7	John Higgins (SCO)	114,000
8	David Gilbert (ENG)	95,500
9	Yan Bingtao (CHN)	93,000
10	Hossein Vafaei (IRN)	91,500
11	Kyren Wilson (ENG)	81,000
12	Ricky Walden (ENG)	78,000
13	Gary Wilson (ENG)	72,000
14	Judd Trump (ENG)	68,000
15	Jimmy Robertson (ENG)	62,500
16	Barry Hawkins (ENG)	59,500

== Tournament draw ==
Last 16; Best of 11 frames
1	Zhao Xintong (CHN)	3
16	Barry Hawkins (ENG)	6
8	David Gilbert (ENG)	4
9	Yan Bingtao (CHN)	6
5	Mark Allen (NIR)	2
12	Ricky Walden (ENG)	6
4	Mark Williams (WAL)	6
13	Gary Wilson (ENG)	3
3	Ronnie O'Sullivan (ENG)	6
14	Judd Trump (ENG)	3
6	Neil Robertson (AUS)	6
11	Kyren Wilson (ENG)	4
7	John Higgins (SCO)	6
10	Hossein Vafaei (IRN)	3
2	Luca Brecel (BEL)	1
15	Jimmy Robertson (ENG)	6

Quarter-finals; Best of 11 frames
16	(England) Barry Hawkins	6
9	(China) Yan Bingtao	5
12	(England) Ricky Walden	6
4	(Wales) Mark Williams	5
3	(England) Ronnie O'Sullivan	3
6	(Australia) Neil Robertson	6
7	(Scotland) John Higgins	4
15	(England) Jimmy Robertson	6

Semi-finals; Best of 11 frames
16	(England) Barry Hawkins	6
12	(England) Ricky Walden	2
6	(Australia) Neil Robertson	6
15	(England) Jimmy Robertson	1

Final; Best of 19 frames
16	(England) Barry Hawkins	5
6	(Australia) Neil Robertson	10

=== Final ===
Final: Best of 19 frames. Referee: Jan Verhaas; Aldersley Leisure Village, Wolverhampton, England, 13 February 2022
Barry Hawkins (16); England	5–10	Neil Robertson (6); Australia
Afternoon: 91–0, 18–64, 55–75, 0–107 (107), 0–105 (105), 0–130 (130), 71–0, 141–0 (137); Evening: 1–90, 1–118, 92–0, 96–26, 15–120 (116), 0–91, 1–77
137	Highest break	130
1	Century breaks	4

== Century breaks ==
A total of 25 century breaks were made during the tournament.

- 141 – Kyren Wilson
- 139, 135, 132, 123, 103, 100 – Yan Bingtao
- 137, 126, 115 – Barry Hawkins
- 134, 108, 101 – John Higgins
- 130, 116, 114, 107, 105, 100 – Neil Robertson
- 127 – Ronnie O'Sullivan
- 123 – Ricky Walden
- 107, 103, 102 – Mark Williams
- 102 – Jimmy Robertson
