= 2019 Tour Championship =

Snooker tournament

2019 Coral Tour Championship

Tournament information
- Dates: 19–24 March 2019
- Venue: Venue Cymru
- City: Llandudno
- Country: Wales
- Organisation: World Snooker
- Format: Ranking event
- Total prize fund: £375,000
- Winner's share: £150,000
- Highest break: Neil Robertson (AUS) (135)

Final
- Champion: Ronnie O'Sullivan (ENG)
- Runner-up: Neil Robertson (AUS)
- Score: 13–11

The 2019 Tour Championship (officially the 2019 Coral Tour Championship) was a professional snooker ranking tournament that took place from 19 to 24 March 2019 at Venue Cymru in Llandudno, Wales. Organised by World Snooker, it was the first edition of the Tour Championship and the third and final event of the inaugural Coral Cup. It was the eighteenth ranking event of the 2018–19 snooker season.

The draw for the Tour Championship comprised the top eight players based on the single year ranking list, taking part in a single elimination tournament. Each match was played over a minimum of two sessions, the final as best-of-25-frames over two days. The winner of the tournament won £150,000 out of a total prize fund of £375,000. The event was sponsored by betting company Coral.

In a repeat of the Players Championship final two weeks prior, Ronnie O'Sullivan met Neil Robertson in the final. O'Sullivan won the match 13–11 to claim his 36th ranking title, equalling Stephen Hendry's record of ranking event wins. On winning the tournament, O'Sullivan returned to the world number one position for the first time since May 2010, ending Mark Selby's four-year reign as world number one, and won the Coral Cup. In regaining the ranking, he also became the oldest world number one since Ray Reardon in 1983. This was O'Sullivan's third ranking title win of the season, having won the UK Championship and the Players Championship earlier in the season.

The event featured 22 century breaks made by six players. The tournament's highest break prize of £5,000 was won by Robertson, scoring a break of 135 in frame 16 of his first round victory over Selby.

== Format ==
The 2019 Tour Championship was the third and final event in the 2019 Coral Cup series, first introduced in the 2018/2019 season, after the World Grand Prix and the Players Championship. The players qualified for the series by virtue of their placement on the one-year ranking list, rather than by world ranking. The event featured the top eight players from the one-year ranking list taking part in a single-elimination tournament. The Tour Championship was played from 19 to 24 March 2019 in Llandudno, Wales and organised by World Snooker.

The Tour Championship was the first event since the 2010 UK Championship (and other than the World Championship) in which every match was played over multiple sessions, with two in the quarter-finals and semi-finals, and three sessions in the final. The best-of-25-frames final, held on 23 and 24 March, was the first non-World Championship match of this length or longer since the 1992 UK Championship final.

The tournament was primarily broadcast by ITV4 in the United Kingdom. It also aired on Sky Sport in New Zealand, NowTV in Hong Kong, and Superstars Online in China. Eurosport did not broadcast the event, despite covering all but one of the other snooker tournaments this season. (Note: Eurosport also did not cover the 2018 Champion of Champions.) The event was sponsored by sports betting company Coral.

=== Prize fund ===
The tournament was the first Tour Championship in this format. The event had a prize fund of £375,000 with the winner receiving £150,000. The breakdown of prize money for the event was as below:

- Winner: £150,000
- Runner-up: £60,000
- Semi-final: £40,000
- Quarter-final: £20,000
- Highest break: £5,000
- Total: £375,000

The "rolling 147 prize" for a maximum break stood at £15,000, but went unclaimed.

=== Qualification ===
Qualification for the event was for the top eight players on the one-year ranking list up to and including the 2019 Gibraltar Open.

Rank	Player	Total points
1	Mark Allen (NIR)	394,000
2	Ronnie O'Sullivan (ENG)	353,500
3	Judd Trump (ENG)	307,000
4	Neil Robertson (AUS)	305,500
5	Mark Selby (ENG)	246,500
6	Mark Williams (WAL)	223,500
7	Stuart Bingham (ENG)	213,000
8	Kyren Wilson (ENG)	190,500

== Summary ==
=== First round ===
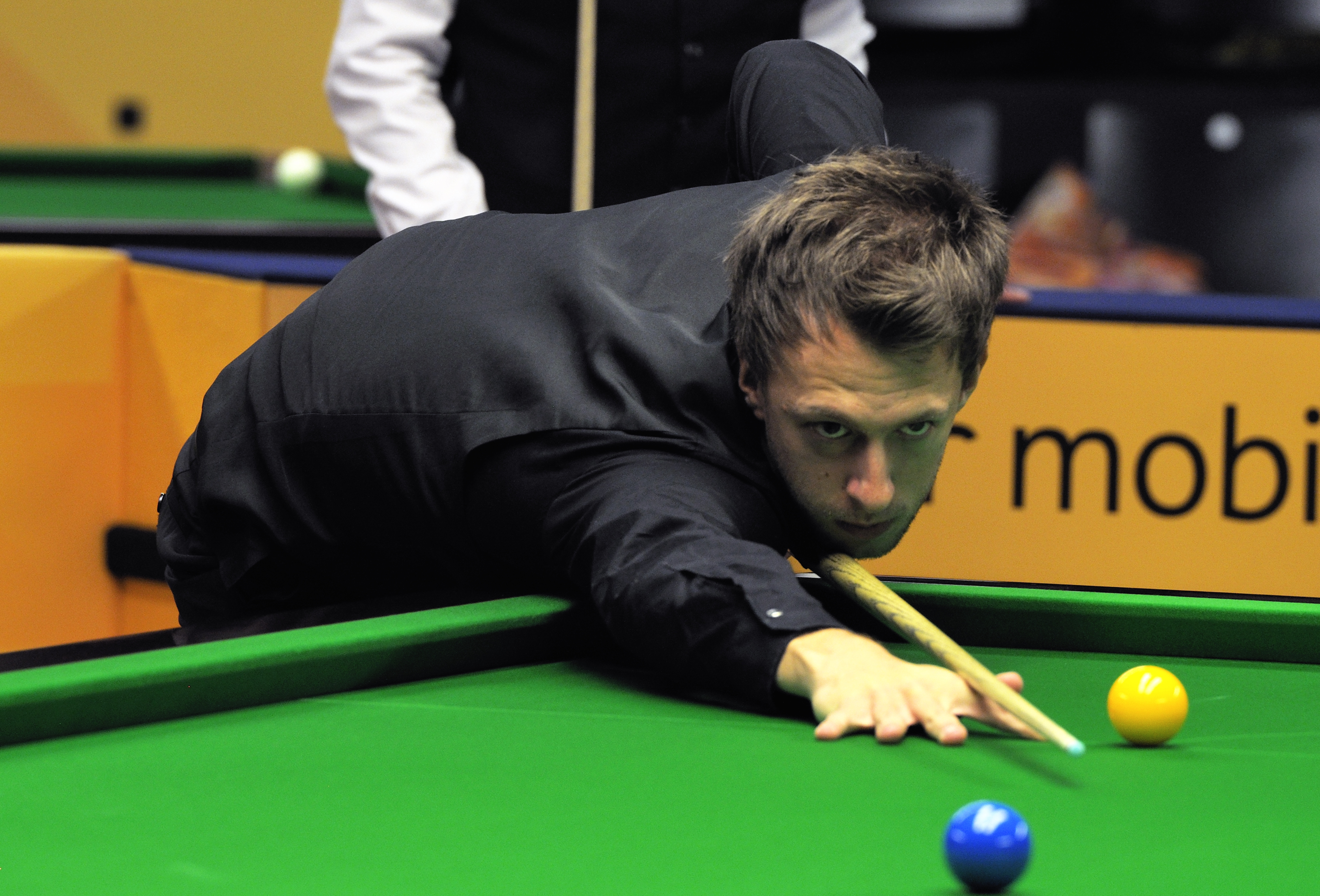
Judd Trump overcame a three-frame deficit to defeat reigning world champion Mark Williams 9–8.

The first round was held from 19 to 20 March, all matches being played over two sessions as best-of-17-frames matches. Neil Robertson played Mark Selby in the opening match of the tournament. Robertson progressed into an early lead, taking the first two frames with breaks of 88 and 110. Selby then won six frames in a row, including three century breaks, to lead 6–2 after the first session.

Robertson won the first three frames of the second session, to reduce his deficit to 5–6. Selby missed the frame ball pink in frame 12, allowing Robertson to tie the match at 6–6. Robertson also took frame 13 to lead the match for the first time since frame two. Selby won frame 14 despite requiring three snookers, and also frame 15, to lead the match again at 8–7, before Robertson took the match to a decider with a break of 135. Frame 17 – the final frame of the match – lasted over an hour and went to the final black. After Selby attempted a double, Robertson potted the black ball to win the frame and match.

Reigning Masters champion Judd Trump drew reigning World champion Mark Williams in the second first round match. The pair were tied at 4–4 after the first session, but Williams won four of the next five frames to lead 8–5. Trump then completed a comeback and won the next four frames to come through another final frame decider. Post match, Trump commented that Williams "controlled" the match, but missed too many long pots towards the end of the match.

Ronnie O'Sullivan played Stuart Bingham in the third first round match. O'Sullivan took a lead of 6–2 after the first session of the match, before winning frame nine and a 45-minute frame ten to lead 8–2. Although Bingham replied by winning frame 11, O'Sullivan took frame 12 to win the match 9–3.

The fourth and final first round match was a repeat of the 2018 Masters final, with Mark Allen drawing Kyren Wilson. Allen took an early lead, finishing 6–2 after the initial session of the match, and increased his lead to 7–2 with a century. Wilson captured the next three frames, before Allen won frame 13 to lead 8–5. Wilson won the next two frames to trail 7–8, before losing his momentum in frame 16 allowing Allen to make a break of 71. The top four seeds all won their first round matches to progress to the semi-finals.

=== Semi-finals ===
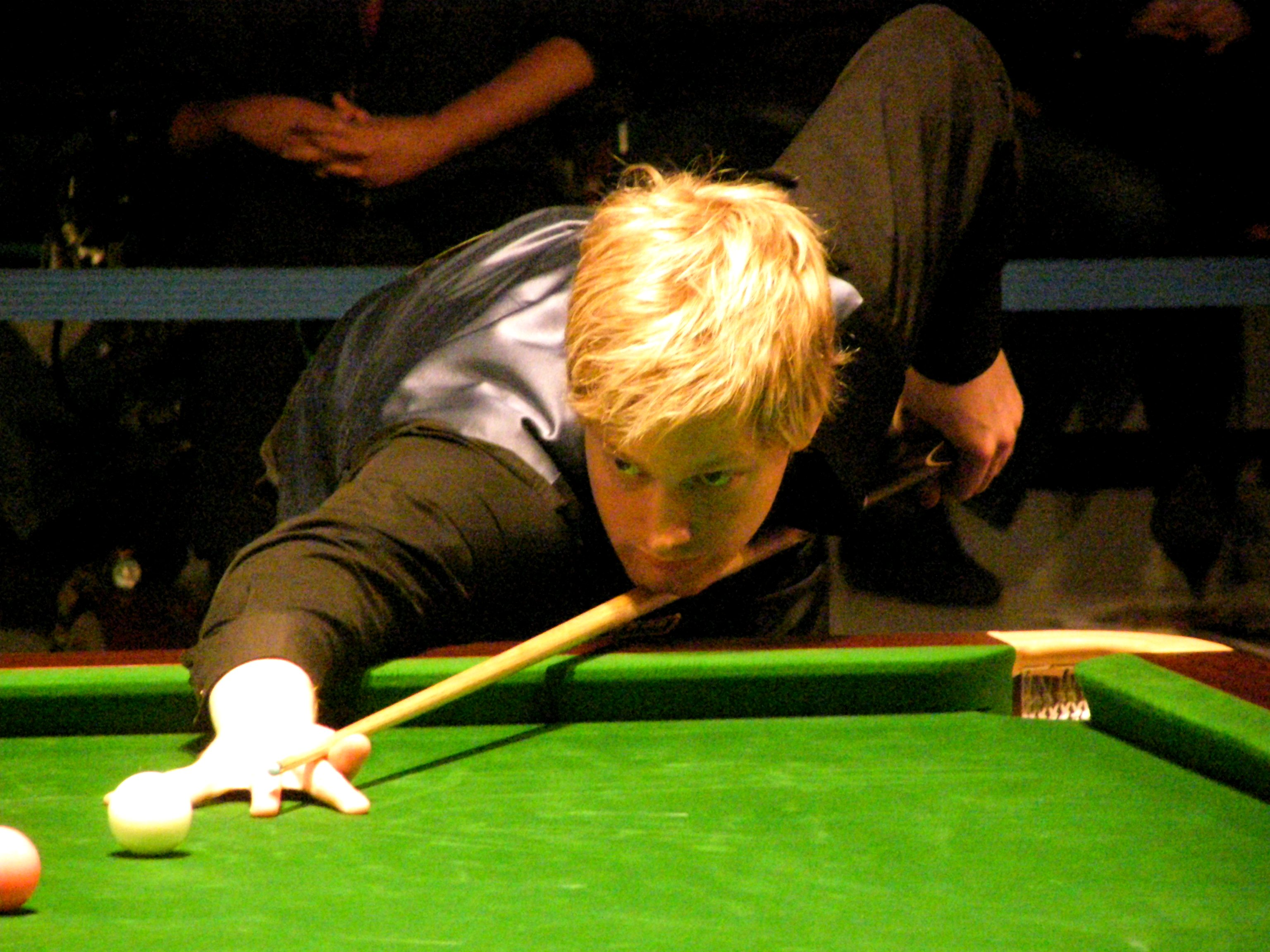
Neil Robertson defeated Mark Allen 10–6 to reach the final.

In the second round, which took place on 21 and 22 March, the four remaining players competed in two best-of-19-frames matches, each played over two sessions. The first semi-final was played on 21 March, between Judd Trump and Ronnie O'Sullivan. The pair were the highest two in the ranking list for the Coral Cup, both having won one of the previous two events in the Coral series: Trump winning the World Grand Prix, and O'Sullivan the Players Championship. This semi-final was a rematch of the season's Masters final, and the two players also met in the final of the 2018 Northern Ireland Open, Trump winning on both occasions.

Trump took the first frame in the opening session of the match with a break of 54, before O'Sullivan tied the score at one frame apiece. Trump won frames three and four to lead 3–1 at the interval. He also won frame five, before O'Sullivan made a century to trail by two frames. Trump took the remaining two frames of the session to lead 6–2.

O'Sullivan clinched the first two frames of the second session to reduce his deficit to 4–6, before Trump won two of the next three frames to lead 8–5. O'Sullivan won both frames 14 and 15 with two century breaks of 130 and 134 to trail 7–8, and won a tense frame 16 to tie the match. Trump won a scrappy frame 17 to lead again, before O'Sullivan won frame 18 to send the match into the final frame. In the decider, Trump secured the first chance, but his break ended at 50 points. Despite a waistcoat foul on his previous shot, O'Sullivan was given another opportunity to clear the table, but he missed the final red near the cushion rail, allowing his opponent back on the table. Trump missed the match-winning yellow close to the cushion into the green pocket, which eventually allowed O'Sullivan to clear the table to complete the comeback on the final black ball.

The second semi-final was played on 22 March, between Mark Allen and Neil Robertson. Allen got off to a good start, winning the first two frames of the match including a break of 78. Robertson then won the next five frames, which included back-to-back centuries in frames four and five and a clearance of 69 in frame seven. Allen then captured the final frame of the session to trail 3–5.

The match's second session started with Robertson extending his lead to 6–3, but Allen won the next three frames with breaks of 82 and 103 to tie the match. Robertson then won the next three frames with a combined 303 points without reply. In frame 16, Allen scored enough points to take the frame to the "snookers required" stage, only to snooker himself on the final red behind the green ball, allowing Robertson to clear the table and win the match 10–6.

=== Final ===
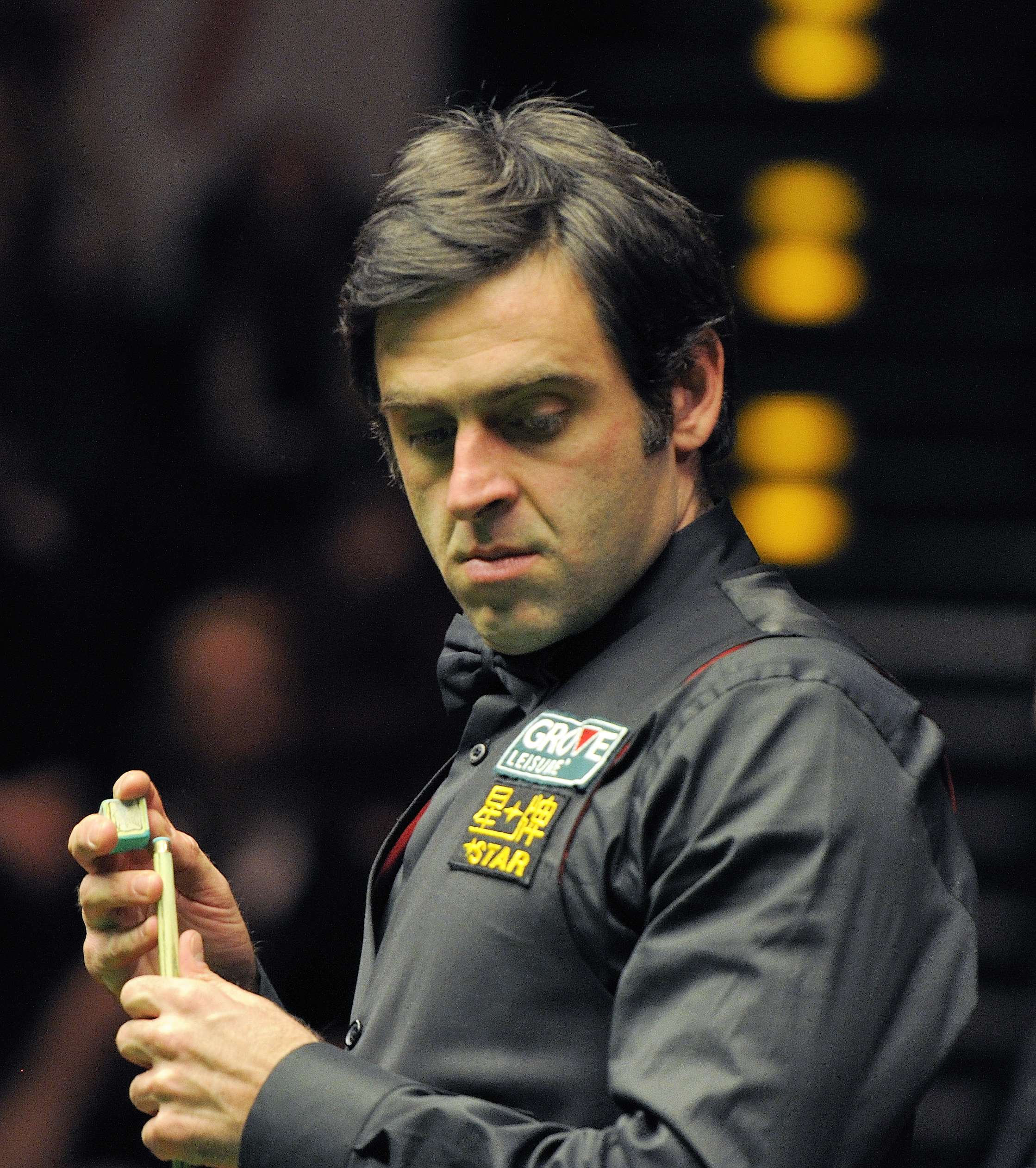
Ronnie O'Sullivan won the event, defeating Neil Robertson in the final 13–11 to win his third championship of the season.

The final was played on 23 and 24 March, spread over three sessions in a best-of-25-frames match. The two contestants in the final were Ronnie O'Sullivan and Neil Robertson, who had also met in the final of the Players Championship two weeks prior. The winner of the match would also win the Coral Cup, awarded to the player who accumulates the most prize money over the three Coral tournaments.

The opening session of the match was played on the evening of 23 March. Robertson won the first two frames, and O'Sullivan the next two with breaks of 74 and 97 to tie the match 2–2 at the mid-session interval. O'Sullivan won the next three frames after the interval, with breaks of 71 and 67, to lead 5–2. Robertson made a frame-winning 48 break in the final frame of the session to trail by two frames overnight.

The second and third sessions were both played on 24 March. O'Sullivan extended his lead in frame nine with a century break, but then missed a frame ball pink in the next, allowing Robertson to win the frame to trail by two again. Robertson made a break of 106 to win frame 11, before O'Sullivan restored his two frame advantage, winning frame 12, to lead 7–5, and later 8–6. Robertson won both of the remaining two frames of the session to tie the match 8–8 heading into the final session.

O'Sullivan won the first frame of the evening session (frame 17) with a break of 129, before Robertson levelled the score at 9–9. They also shared the next two frames to tie the match at 10–10 leading into the interval. O'Sullivan pulled ahead to 12–10 in the next two frames. In frame 23, Robertson accidentally knocked a red into the pocket whilst opening the pack, but O'Sullivan scored only 16 points from the opportunity, which allowed Robertson to win the frame to trail 11–12. Robertson also had the first chance in frame 24, making a break of 28, before missing a black ball from the spot allowing O'Sullivan to win the frame and tournament with a break of 89. This was the 36th ranking championship victory of O'Sullivan's career, equalling the record set by Stephen Hendry between 1987 and 2005.

O'Sullivan reached world number one on winning the event, replacing Mark Selby who had held the position since February 2015. At the age of 43, O'Sullivan became the oldest snooker world number one since Ray Reardon in 1983. He also picked up the Coral Cup, having accrued a total of £280,000 over the three Coral events (and winning two). The closest challenger for the award, Judd Trump, had earned more than £100,000 less prize money over the same events.

== Main draw ==
Quarter-finals; Best of 17 frames
1	Mark Allen (NIR)	9
8	Kyren Wilson (ENG)	7
4	Neil Robertson (AUS)	9
5	Mark Selby (ENG)	8
3	Judd Trump (ENG)	9
6	Mark Williams (WAL)	8
2	Ronnie O'Sullivan (ENG)	9
7	Stuart Bingham (ENG)	3

Semi-finals; Best of 19 frames
1	(Northern Ireland) Mark Allen	6
4	(Australia) Neil Robertson	10
3	(England) Judd Trump	9
2	(England) Ronnie O'Sullivan	10

Final; Best of 25 frames
4	(Australia) Neil Robertson	11
2	(England) Ronnie O'Sullivan	13

=== Final ===
Final: Best of 25 frames. Referee: Greg Coniglio; Venue Cymru, Llandudno, Wales, 23–24 March 2019
Neil Robertson (4); Australia	11–13	Ronnie O'Sullivan (2); England
Saturday evening: 69–6, 87–29, 0–74, 0–97, 16–77, 24–106, 60–71, 65–24; Sunday afternoon: 17–100 (100), 60–49, 106–0 (106), 32–69, 82–27, 0–89, 61–7, 68–7; Sunday evening: 5–129 (129), 62–36, 0–95, 77–10, 30–80, 4–91, 73–20, 35–89
106	Highest break	129
1	Century breaks	2

== Coral Cup ==
The 2018/2019 Snooker season introduced the Coral Cup series, featuring three events: the World Grand Prix, the Players Championship, and the Tour Championship. For all three events, qualification was based on players' rankings on the one-year ranking list. Ronnie O'Sullivan won the inaugural "Coral Cup", earning the highest amount of prize money overall across the series, however unlike later seasons he did not earn a monetary bonus. The top ten players with the most prize money won in total over the three events is shown below: (Note: Prizes in bold denote an event win)

Player	World Grand Prix	Players Championship	Tour Championship	Total
(England) Ronnie O'Sullivan	5,000	125,000	150,000	280,000
(England) Judd Trump	100,000	30,000	40,000	170,000
(Australia) Neil Robertson	5,000	50,000	60,000	115,000
(Northern Ireland) Mark Allen	7,500	30,000	40,000	77,500
(England) Ali Carter	40,000	10,000	0	50,000
(England) Mark Selby	12,500	10,000	20,000	42,500
(England) Stuart Bingham	7,500	15,000	20,000	42,500
(England) Kyren Wilson	12,500	10,000	20,000	42,500
(Wales) Mark Williams	5,000	15,000	20,000	40,000
(England) Barry Hawkins	20,000	10,000	0	30,000

== Century breaks ==
The event featured a total of 22 century breaks. The highest break of 135 was compiled by Neil Robertson in his opening round match against Mark Selby.

- 135, 110, 106, 106, 106, 101 – Neil Robertson
- 134, 130, 129, 121, 113, 111, 100, 100 – Ronnie O'Sullivan
- 123, 117, 103 – Mark Selby
- 123, 105, 103 – Mark Allen
- 103 – Mark Williams
- 100 – Judd Trump
