= Venue Cymru =

Theatre in Llandudno, Wales

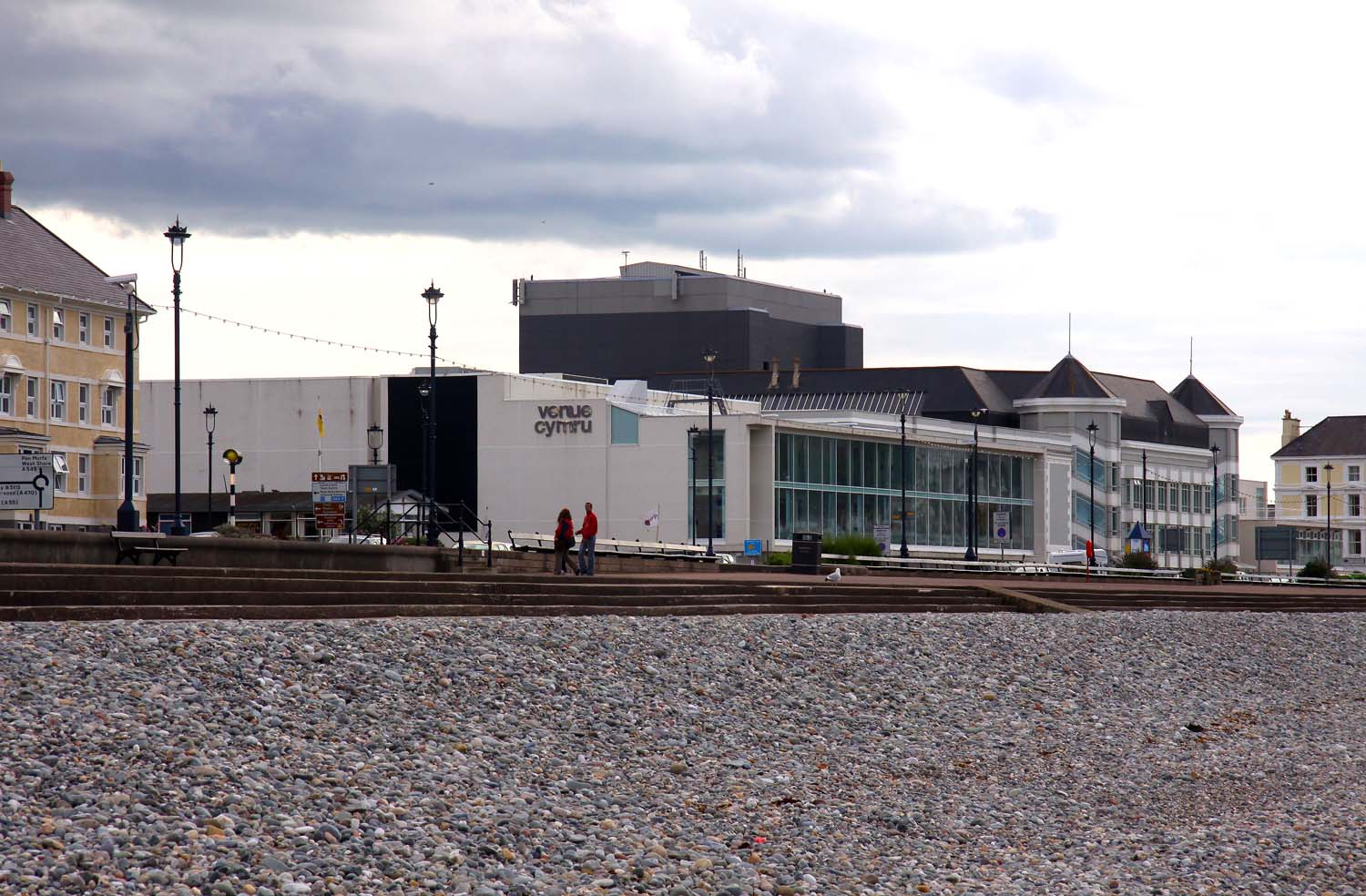
- Interactive map of Venue Cymru
- Former names: Aberconwy Centre (1982–94); North Wales Theatre and Conference Centre (1994–2007)
- Address: The Promenade; Llandudno, Conwy County Borough, Wales; LL30 1BB
- Coordinates: 53°19′19″N 3°49′02″W
- Owner: Conwy County Borough Council

Construction
- Opened: 1982
- Renovated: 1994, 2005
- Cost: £10.7 million (2005 redevelopment)

Website
- venuecymru.co.uk

Venue Cymru is a theatre, conference centre and arena in Llandudno, Conwy County Borough, North Wales. Venue Cymru has a theatre, conference centre, and arena.

== Victoria Palace ==
The site lies at the edge of Ty'n-y-ffrith, the 'house in the sheep pasture'.

The first theatre at the site was the Victoria Palace, which opened in July 1894. It was intended to be a temporary building, and it was designed as a 1,150-seat concert hall for Jules Rivière (then aged 75) and his 42-musician orchestra. Rivière had previously performed at the Pier Pavilion before he fell out with the Llandudno Pier Company. Victoria Palace attracted eminent visiting soloists including Sir Charles and Lady Hallé who in 1894 gave a piano and violin recital with Rivière's orchestra.

The Victoria Palace was the first part of a project that would have later seen the construction of a pier.

== Llandudno Opera House ==
In 1900 it was renamed the Llandudno Opera House. It hosted the Carl Rosa Opera Company.

== Hippodrome ==
It was renamed as the Hippodrome, and was used as a roller-skating rink, a dance hall and for summer shows.

== Arcadia ==
The theatre was purchased by Will Catlin on 3 June 1916. It was renamed as the Arcadia. The theatre had 1,147 seats, and was one of six theatres in Llandudno to last for many years. It was the home of Catlin's Peirrots and Catlin's Showtime. Ken Dodd was a regular performer.

The Arcadia provided 1,147 seats in the auditorium and was the last of Llandudno's many theatres and cinemas to offer traditional seaside entertainments. It was the home of Will Catlin's Pierrots, which eventually became presented as "Catlin's Follies with an all star cast". Catlin's Follies survived the sudden death in 1953 (aged 82) of Will Catlin. The shows continued until 1968, when Llandudno Urban Council purchased the theatre. The Arcadia continued as a summer theatre under local authority ownership until 1993.

It closed on 22 June 1994, and was derelict for the next decade, before being demolished in July 2005.

== Aberconwy Centre ==
The Aberconwy Centre opened to the west of the Arcadia theatre in 1982. The conference venue had space for over 1,000 conference attendees. It also featured squash courts, sun beds and badminton courts.

The centre was redeveloped in 1994, and it was renamed as the North Wales Theatre and Conference Centre. It hosted a 1,500-seat auditorium/theatre, as well as a 700 square metres (7,500 sq ft) conference hall with capacity for 800 seated, or 1,000 standing, people.

== Venue Cymru ==
In July 2005 the Arcadia theatre was demolished to make way for an atrium and meeting and conference rooms adjoining the North Wales Theatre and Conference Centre. The building was also extended to the west. After the redevelopment, the venue hosted a new 1,550 square metres (16,700 sq ft) arena, capable of hosting 1,800 seated, or 2,500 standing people, increasing the overall capacity of the venue to over 5,000 people. The western extension incorporated a café, restaurant and a box office, as well as office space.

The redevelopment cost £10.7 million, which was provided by Conwy County Borough Council, the European Union's Objective One Fund program, the Arts Council of Wales, Visit Wales and the Welsh Development Agency.

A competition to rename the building was launched in December 2005. Several months later, the name of Venue Cymru was chosen. It was re-opened on 15 January 2007 by Andrew Davies.

On 27 August 2010, Irish vocal pop band Westlife held a concert for Where We Are Tour supporting their album Where We Are and in 2016, a solo concert by the lead vocalist Shane Filan.

In 2018 and 2019, S4C used the venue to host and broadcast the Chwilio Am Seren national selection to find the Welsh Entry for Junior Eurovision 2018.

The Arena space been used for live rock band performances from acts including Bloc Party, Manic Street Preachers and Feeder.

In April 2020 Venue Cymru was handed over to Betsi Cadwaladr University Health Board where the arena was used to provide additional beds during the COVID-19 pandemic; it was named Ysbyty Enfys Llandudno. In May 2021 it was decommissioned, and was subsequently used as a COVID-19 vaccination centre.
