= 2026 Welsh Open (snooker) =

Snooker tournament

2026 BetVictor Welsh Open
- Part of the Home Nations Series

Tournament information
- Dates: 23 February – 1 March 2026
- Venue: Venue Cymru
- City: Llandudno
- Country: Wales
- Organisation: World Snooker Tour
- Format: Ranking event
- Total prize fund: £550,400
- Winner's share: £100,000
- Highest break: John Higgins (SCO) (144)

Final
- Champion: Barry Hawkins (ENG)
- Runner-up: Jack Lisowski (ENG)
- Score: 9–5

The 2026 Welsh Open (officially the 2026 BetVictor Welsh Open) was a professional snooker tournament that took place from 23 February to 1 March 2026 at Venue Cymru in Llandudno, Wales. Qualifying took place from 9 to 10 January at the Ponds Forge International Sports Centre in Sheffield, England. The 35th consecutive edition of the Welsh Open since it was first staged in 1992, the tournament was the 15th ranking event of the 2025–26 snooker season, following the 2026 Players Championship and preceding the 2026 World Open. It was the fourth and final tournament in the season's Home Nations Series, following the 2025 English Open, the 2025 Northern Ireland Open, and the 2025 Scottish Open. The winner received £100,000 from a total prize fund of £550,400.

Mark Selby was the defending champion, having defeated Stephen Maguire 9–6 in the 2025 final, but he lost 3–4 to Jiang Jun in the last 64. By defeating John Higgins 6–5 in the semi-finals, Jack Lisowski secured the £150,000 Home Nations Series bonus for earning the most cumulative prize money across the four events. Barry Hawkins won the tournament, defeating Lisowski 9–5 in the final to claim his first Welsh Open title and the fifth ranking title of his career.

The event produced 85 century breaks, 33 in the Sheffield qualifiers and 52 at the main stage in Llandudno, of which the highest was a 144 by Higgins in his last-16 match against Zhang Anda. Chang Bingyu made consecutive centuries of 130, 136, 119, and 130 as he defeated Shaun Murphy 4–0 in the last 64. He became the ninth player to make four consecutive centuries in professional competition and the third player to do so in a best-of-seven encounter. Chang also became the first player in professional snooker history to win a multi-frame match without missing a single pot.

== Overview ==
The Welsh Open replaced the Welsh Professional Championship, a non-ranking tournament open only to Welsh players that was held in 1922, in 1977, and annually from 1980 to 1991. Open to players of any nationality, the Welsh Open began in 1992 and is now the third-longest-running ranking event, after the World Snooker Championship and the UK Championship. The inaugural winner was Stephen Hendry, who defeated Darren Morgan 9–3 in the 1992 final. During the 2016–17 snooker season, the Welsh Open became part of the newly created Home Nations Series, alongside the English Open, the Northern Ireland Open, and the Scottish Open. At that time, the trophy was named the Ray Reardon Trophy to honour the six-time world champion from Tredegar. Reardon died in 2024, aged 91.

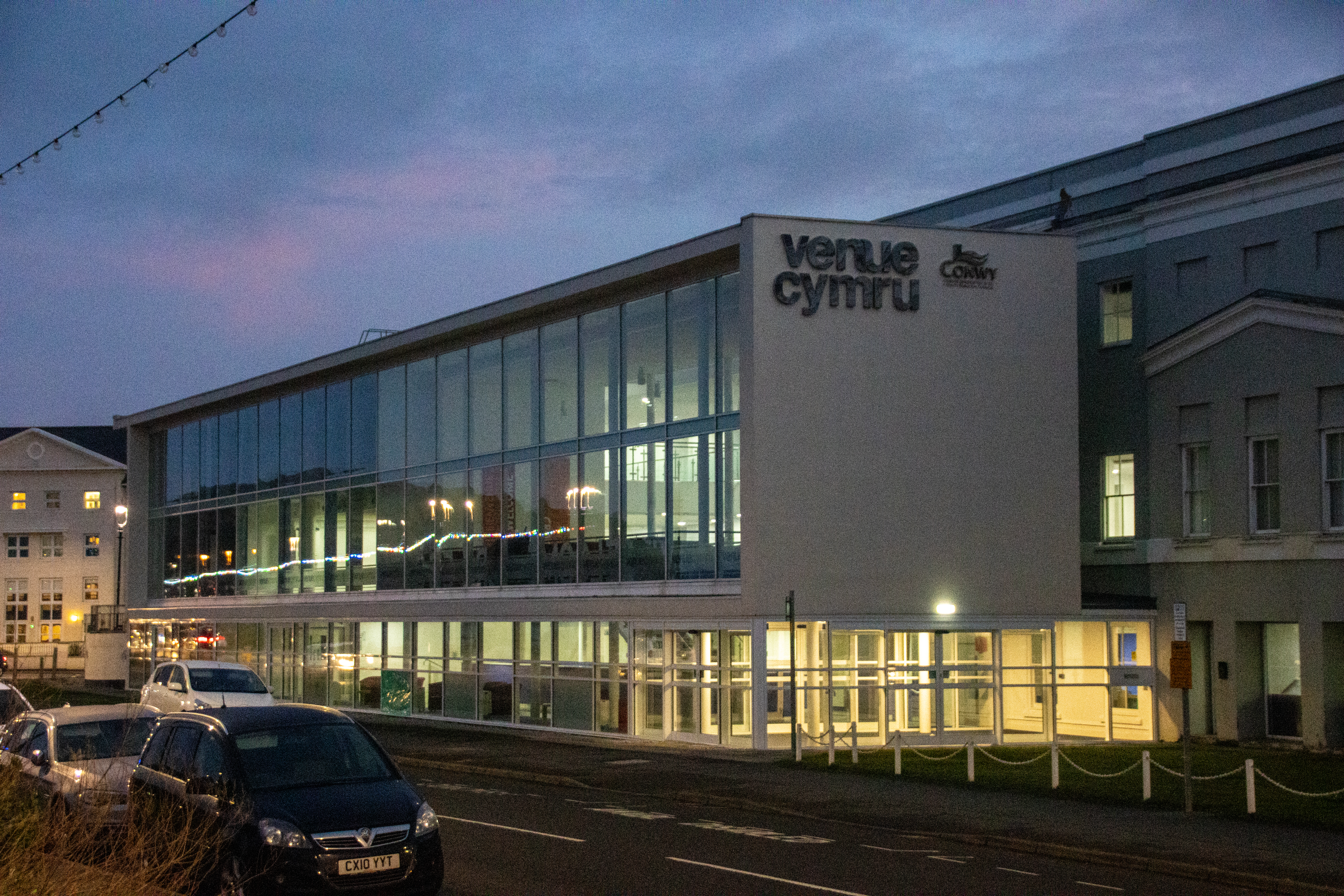
The main stage of the tournament was played at Venue Cymru in Llandudno, Wales.

The 2026 edition of the tournament—its 35th consecutive staging since the inaugural edition in 1992—took place from 23 February to 1 March at Venue Cymru in Llandudno, Wales, the fourth consecutive year the tournament was staged at the venue. Qualifying took place from 9 to 10 January at the Ponds Forge International Sports Centre in Sheffield, England. It was the 15th ranking event of the 2025–26 snooker season, following the 2026 Players Championship and preceding the 2026 World Open, as well as the fourth and final tournament in the season's Home Nations Series, following the 2025 English Open, the 2025 Northern Ireland Open, and the 2025 Scottish Open. Mark Selby was the defending champion, having defeated Stephen Maguire 9–6 in the 2025 final to win his second Welsh Open title.

=== Format ===
The tournament used a tiered format first implemented for the Home Nations Series in the 2024–25 snooker season. In the first qualifying round, players seeded 65–96 faced those seeded 97 and under, including selected amateurs. In the second qualifying round, the 32 winners from the first qualifying round faced players seeded 33–64. At the last-64 stage, the 32 winners from the second qualifying round faced the top 32 seeds.

All matches were played as the best of 7 frames until the quarter-finals, which were the best of 9. The semi-finals were the best of 11, and the final was a best-of-17-frame match played over two sessions.

=== Broadcasters ===
The qualifying rounds were broadcast in the United Kingdom, Germany, Italy, and Austria by Discovery+ and in other European territories by HBO Max. They were broadcast in mainland China by the CBSA‑WPBSA Academy WeChat Channel, the CBSA‑WPBSA Academy Douyin, Huya Live, and Migu. In all other territories (including Ireland) they were streamed by WST Play.

The main stage was broadcast in the United Kingdom by BBC Wales and BBC Red Button, and streamed on BBC iPlayer and the BBC Sport website. It was also broadcast in the UK and Ireland by TNT Sports and Discovery+. It was broadcast in mainland Europe by Eurosport, with streaming coverage on Discovery+ in Germany, Italy, and Austria and on HBO Max in other European territories. It was broadcast in mainland China by the same broadcasters as the qualifying rounds, in Hong Kong by Now TV, in Malaysia and Brunei by Astro SuperSport, in Thailand by True Sports, in Taiwan by Sportcast, in the Philippines by TAP Sports, and in Nigeria, South Africa, Ghana, and Kenya by SportyTV. In territories where no other coverage was available, the tournament was streamed by WST Play.

=== Prize fund ===
The prize fund for the tournament is detailed below. In addition, the player who won the most cumulative prize money across the season's four Home Nations Series events received a bonus of £150,000. The winner of the bonus in the 2025–26 season was Jack Lisowski.

- Winner: £100,000
- Runner-up: £45,000
- Semi-final: £21,000
- Quarter-final: £13,200
- Last 16: £9,000
- Last 32: £5,400
- Last 64: £3,600
- Last 96: £1,000
- Highest break: £5,000
- Total: £550,400

== Summary ==
=== Qualifying ===
In the first qualifying round, veteran player Jimmy White, aged 63, made three half-century breaks as he defeated Sunny Akani 4–1, while 14-year-old Michał Szubarczyk advanced with a whitewash victory over Hatem Yassen. Marco Fu lost the first two frames against Xu Yichen, but he produced breaks of 76, 56, 100, and 95 as he recovered to secure a 4–3 victory. Liam Pullen made a century break of 102 as he beat Ken Doherty 4–1.

In the second qualifying round, Luca Brecel, who had fallen to 43rd in the world rankings since winning the 2023 World Championship, took the first two frames against Farakh Ajaib. Brecel lost the next three frames but recovered to win the match in a deciding frame. Lyu Haotian made a century of 139 as he won the first two frames against Sam Craigie, but Craigie won the match in a deciding frame. Bulcsú Révész whitewashed Noppon Saengkham, while Alexander Ursenbacher defeated Matthew Selt 4–2, and Szubarczyk defeated Jamie Jones by the same score. Amir Sarkhosh recovered from 1–3 behind to beat Scott Donaldson in a decider, while Mitchell Mann defeated Matthew Stevens 4–2. Pullen beat the 2023 winner Robert Milkins in a deciding frame. White failed to reach the main stage, losing 1–4 to David Lilley, and Fu also failed to reach the main stage, losing in a deciding frame to Robbie Williams.

=== Main stage ===
==== Last 64 ====
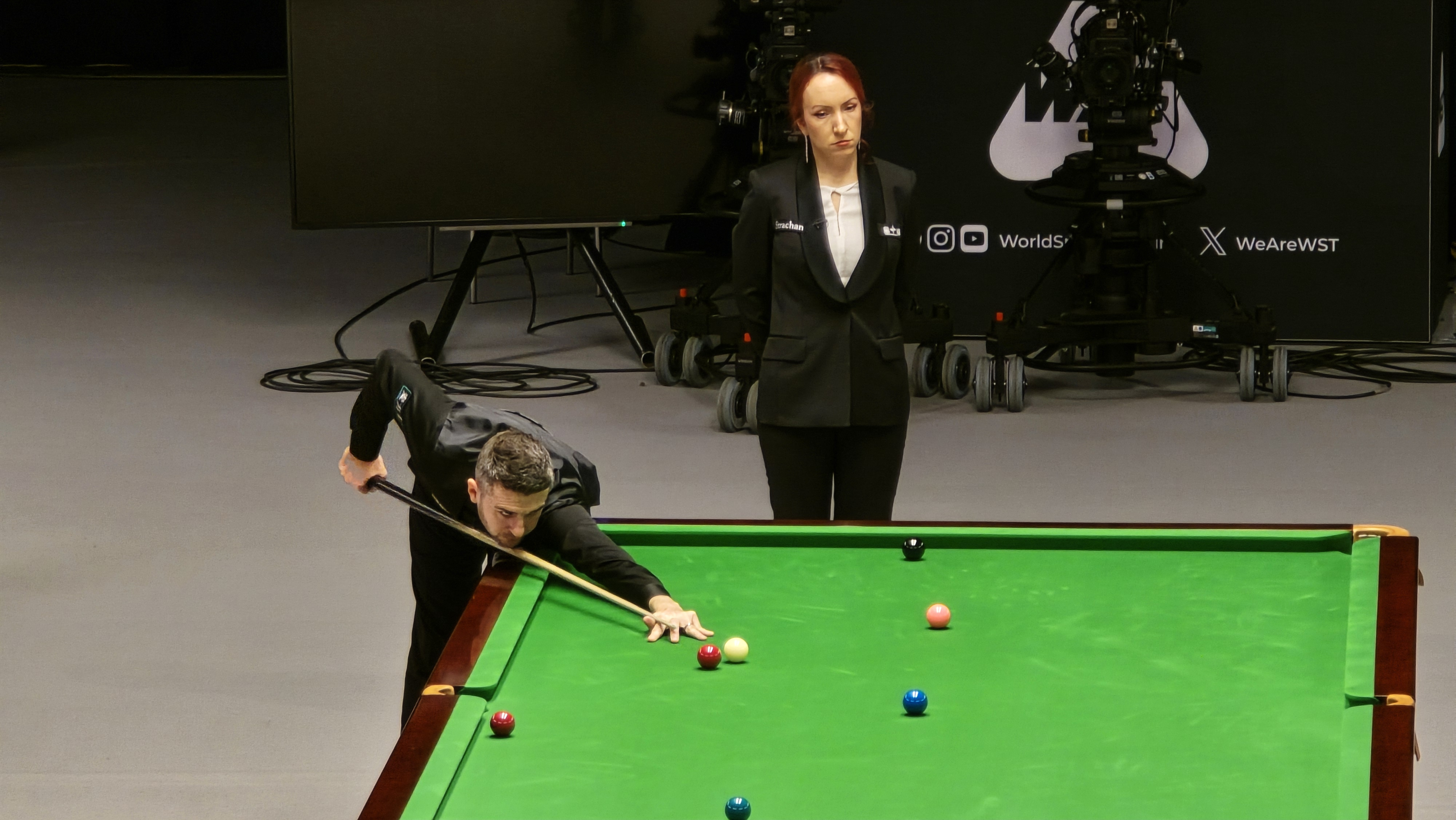
The defending champion Mark Selby (pictured in 2025) lost to the world number 81 Jiang Jun in the last 64.

The defending champion Mark Selby made century breaks of 123 and 137 as he took a 3–1 lead over the world number 81 Jiang Jun. Jiang then won three consecutive frames to secure a 4–3 victory. It was the third time in five years that Selby had lost at the last-64 stage of the tournament. "I was 3–1 behind in no time," Jiang said afterwards. "At that point I honestly didn't think about making a comeback, but I didn't give up either. When it got to the decider, I started to believe I had a chance. The pressure became very strong and my heart was racing." Mark Williams made breaks including 58, 56, and 64 as he secured a 4–2 victory over Michael Holt. "I played solid all the way through, until a few twitches towards the end," said Williams afterwards. "Then I potted a really good pink to win the match. I am still not practising between tournaments but at the venues I probably practise more than any other player, three or four hours a day, and that seems to work for me." Jak Jones, who had broken bones in his right hand by punching a table during a practice session the previous December, defeated Liam Highfield 4–1. Dylan Emery defeated Lei Peifan, Yuan Sijun beat Julien Leclercq, and Barry Hawkins defeated Lilley, all in deciding frames.

Neil Robertson defeated Szubarczyk 4–1 but said his 15-year-old opponent had "huge potential" and "great poise around the table." Wu Yize made breaks including 79, 120, and 128 as he whitewashed Ben Mertens, and the previous year's runner-up Stephen Maguire recovered from 1–3 behind to beat Ricky Walden in a decider. The eighth seed Mark Allen lost 2–4 to David Grace, who recovered from 1–2 behind to win the last three frames, making breaks of 59, 55, and 67. "I haven't had many wins over top-16 players so it has to be one of my best ever," Grace said afterwards. Anthony McGill defeated the 18th seed Ali Carter in a deciding frame.

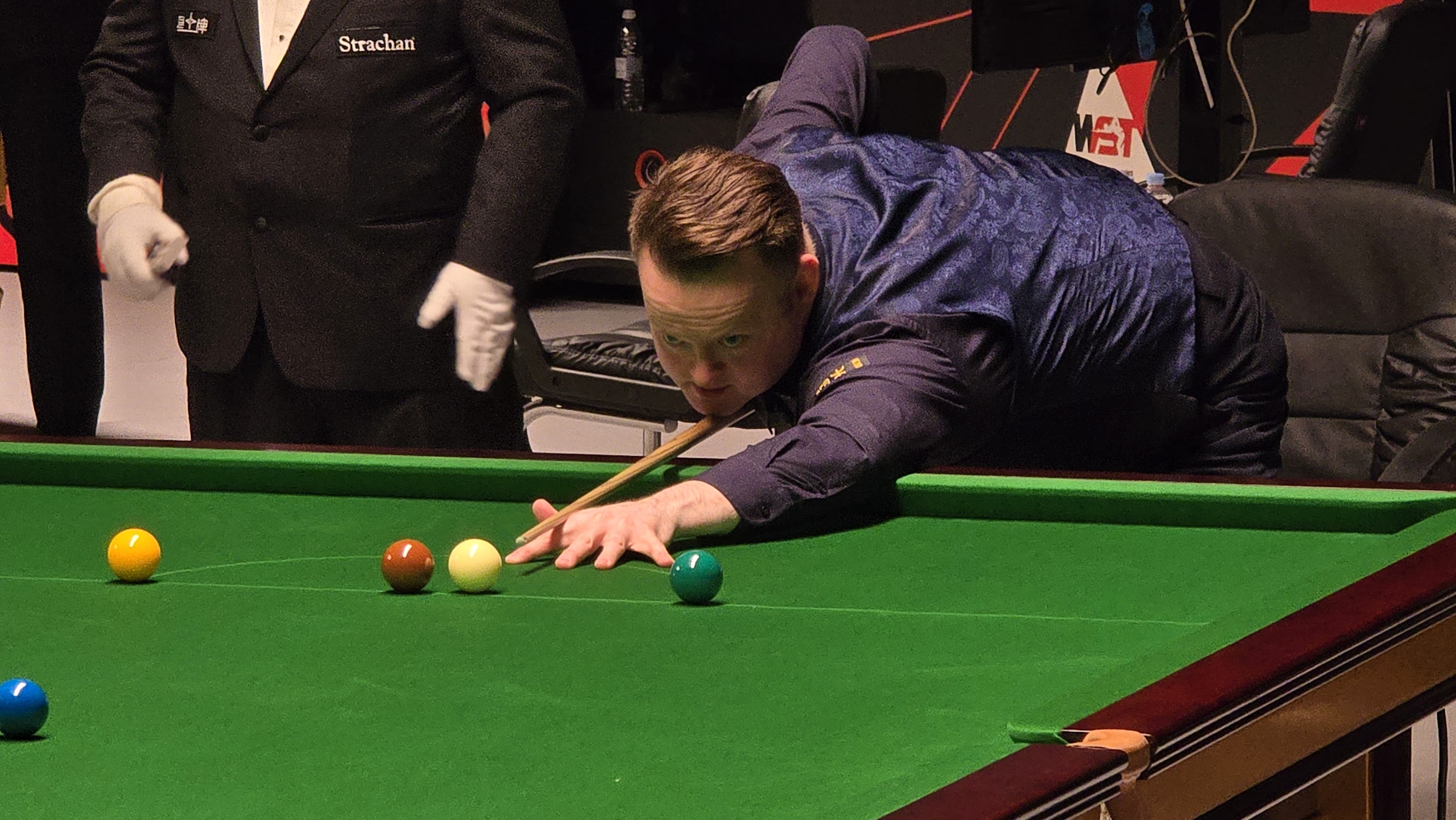
Shaun Murphy (pictured in 2026) scored only one point against Chang Bingyu, who won the match with four consecutive century breaks of 130,136, 119, and 130.

Chang Bingyu made four consecutive century breaks and had a 100% pot success rate as he whitewashed Shaun Murphy, who scored only one point in the match. Chang made back-to-back total clearances of 130 and 136, followed by a century of 119 and a further total clearance of 130. He became the ninth player to make four consecutive centuries in a professional match and only the third, after Neil Robertson and Allen, to do so in a best-of-seven match. Chang said: "I honestly didn't expect to play that well today. Before the match, my mindset was more about learning from [Murphy]. After finishing the match, I felt really happy. It was probably the first time I've played at this level in a best-of-seven. Earlier this season I had quite a few matches where I played well and made some good breaks, but making four centuries in a best-of-seven is definitely a first for me." Murphy called it "the best performance in a best-of-seven match I've ever seen."

The reigning World Champion Zhao Xintong made breaks including 65, 132, and 111 as he took a 3–1 lead over Fan Zhengyi. Fan recovered to tie the scores at 3–3, but Zhao won the decider with a 71 break. Gary Wilson made breaks of 93, 135, 118, and 119 as he whitewashed Amir Sarkhosh, while Jackson Page, Stan Moody, and Zhou Yuelong also advanced with whitewash victories, over Luca Brecel, Jimmy Robertson, and Alexander Ursenbacher respectively. Jack Lisowski defeated Louis Heathcote 4–2, and Révész defeated Ryan Day in a decider. Kyren Wilson produced breaks of 65, 65, 100, and 75 as he defeated Liu Hongyu 4–1, and John Higgins made breaks including 56, 51, and 59 as he beat Liu Wenwei by the same score. Pullen produced two centuries of 100 and 107 against the 11th seed Chris Wakelin. The match went to a deciding frame. Wakelin required a snooker, which he successfully obtained, but he missed the brown after potting the last red, and Pullen won the frame on the colours. The 17th seed Elliot Slessor lost to Sam Craigie, who made breaks including 99 and 110 and went on to win the match in a deciding frame.

==== Last 32 ====
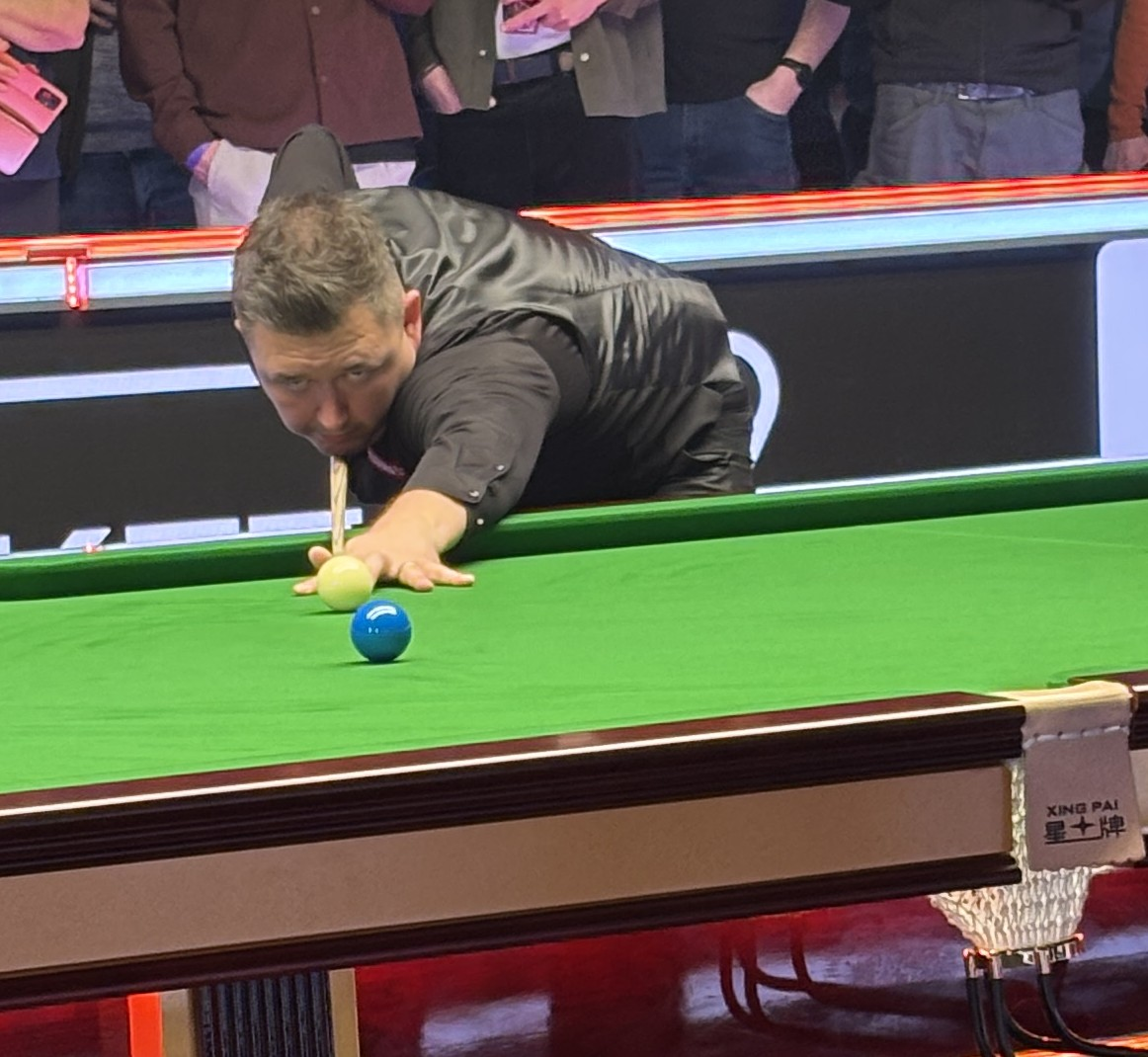
The world number two Kyren Wilson (pictured in 2026) lost 1–4 to Zhou Yuelong.

From 2–3 down against Chang, Page made a century of 101 to tie the scores and then a 48 break to secure victory in the deciding frame. "I knew there was no way Chang could play as well as he did yesterday again," Page said afterwards, referencing Chang's four consecutive centuries against Murphy in the previous round. "He is a hell of a player but I managed to get over the line today. I am putting a lot of work in. This season has been a bit frustrating, it hasn't been great." Mark Williams reached the last 16 of the Welsh Open for the first time since the 2021 edition as he beat Martin O'Donnell 4–1. Neil Robertson lost a 51-minute opening frame against Hossein Vafaei but then won four consecutive frames for a 4–1 victory, finishing the match with back-to-back centuries of 100 and 118. Jak Jones beat McGill, Hawkins defeated Pang Junxu, and Wu beat Joe O'Connor, all by 4–2 scorelines. Lisowski trailed Xiao Guodong 1–3 but recovered to win three consecutive frames for a 4–3 victory. Robbie Williams lost the first two frames against Maguire but recovered to win the match in a decider. Jiang advanced with a whitewash victory over Yuan.

Zhou recorded a 4–1 victory over the world number two Kyren Wilson, who had failed to reach the semi-finals of a ranking event thus far in the season. Craigie made breaks including 84, 72, and 111 as he beat Gary Wilson by the same score. Facing Moody, Zhao won the first three frames. Moody won the next two, but Zhao took frame six with a century of 122 to secure a 4–2 victory. David Gilbert made breaks of 81 and 123 as he took a 2–1 lead over Stuart Bingham, but Bingham took the next three frames for a 4–2 win. The result meant that Bingham had defeated Gilbert in all 13 of their professional encounters. Pullen made a century of 103 to win the opening frame against Zhang Anda, but Zhang won four of the next five, also securing a 4–2 victory. Higgins advanced after defeating Révész in a deciding frame. Afterwards, Higgins complimented his teenaged Hungarian opponent, saying: "I was really impressed by [Révész], he played a good game. He has probably the best swagger there is in snooker and he is great for the game because we need more players from mainland Europe to follow Luca Brecel. [Révész] is really improving and he's certainly one to follow."

==== Last 16 ====
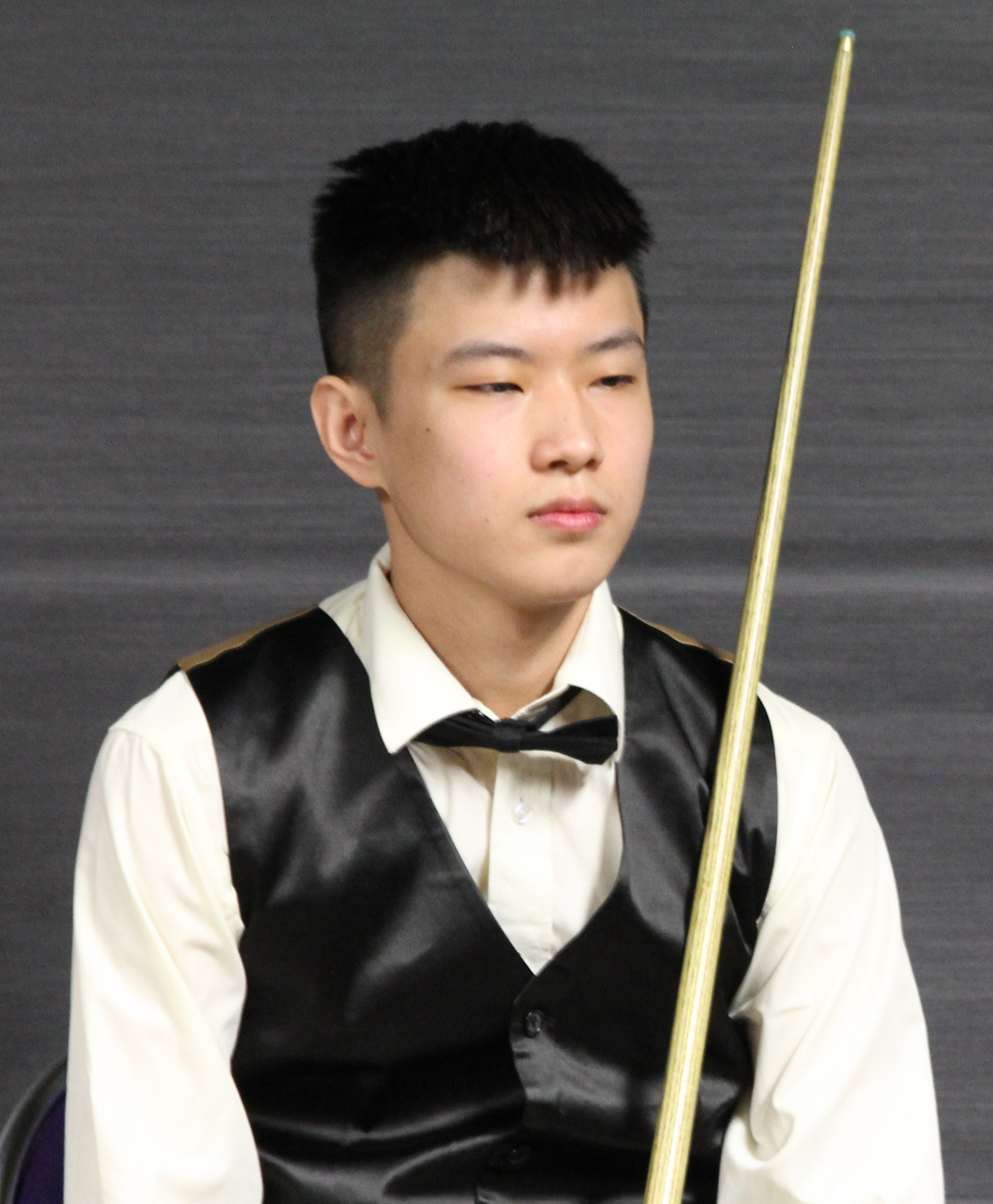
The reigning World Champion Zhao Xintong (pictured in 2016) lost to Stuart Bingham, ending an 11-match streak that included back-to-back ranking titles.

Jak Jones began his match against the world number three Neil Robertson with a century of 126 in the opening frame, but Robertson responded with a 122 in frame two. The match went to a deciding frame, in which Robertson defeated Jones on the colours after playing a shot on the last brown that he described as one of the best of his career. "It wasn't as if I threw my whole arm at it. It was really well controlled and greatly timed," Robertson said. "The pink was also difficult because I couldn't inject much pace into it so if I had missed it might have stayed over the pocket. Thankfully I got through because in the decider we both missed chances." Hawkins and Mark Williams were tied at 2–2, Williams having made a century of 115 in frame two. In frame five, Williams went in-off while on a 57 break, and Hawkins won the frame with a 62 clearance. Hawkins went on to secure a 4–2 win with an 84 break in frame six. "Sometimes when you have an injury it takes your mind off everything, you just go out there and play," said Hawkins, who had considered withdrawing from the event due to back pain. "A few people persuaded me to play. I took some painkillers and as my first match went on it loosened up a bit. I don't know how I hurt it. I might have tweaked it in the gym, and then went to practise and it got worse." Jiang beat Robbie Williams 4–1, reaching the second ranking quarter-final of his career. Wu made breaks of 78, 71, 104, and 70 as he whitewashed Grace.

Bingham, winner of the 2017 edition, made breaks including 75 and 64 as he defeated Zhao 4–2. This ended an 11-match winning streak that had secured Zhao back-to-back ranking titles at the 2026 World Grand Prix and 2026 Players Championship. "In the first frame my hand was shaking like a leaf," Bingham said afterwards. "It was just adrenaline. From the second frame I settled down and took most of my chances. If I can have a good run here it could get me into the top 16 for the [World Championship] so there's a lot riding on it." Lisowski made breaks of 67, 84, 99, and 54 as he beat Page 4–2 in a fast-paced match that lasted just 66 minutes. The losses by Jak Jones, Mark Williams, and Page meant that all remaining Welsh players exited the tournament at the last-16 stage, continuing a streak whereby no Welsh player had won the Welsh Open since Mark Williams at the 1999 edition. Zhou made breaks including 58, 74, and 54 as he beat Craigie 4–1. Higgins made breaks of 95, 78, and 60 in his match against Zhang. He completed a 4–2 victory with a total clearance of 144, reaching a record-extending 156th ranking quarter-final.

==== Quarter-finals ====
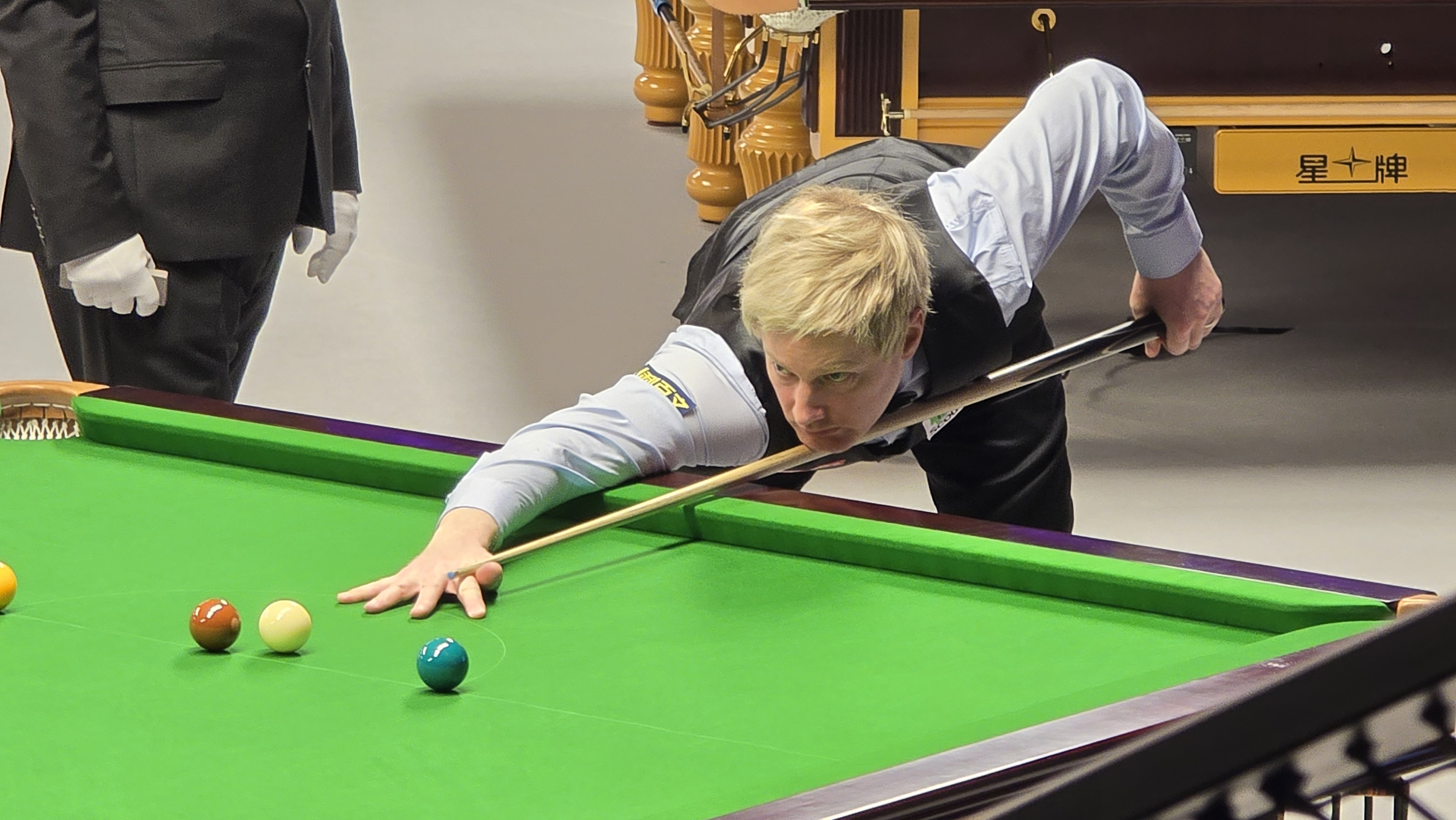
The world number three Neil Robertson (pictured in 2025) lost to Barry Hawkins, who won the match 5–3 despite making only one break over 40.

The world number 14 Hawkins played the world number three Neil Robertson. In the opening frame, Robertson missed the last red while on a break of 53, and Hawkins secured the frame on the colours. Robertson won frame two with a century of 102, but Hawkins won a safety battle on the last brown to take frame three and also won frame four to lead 3–1 at the mid-session interval, despite having made a highest break of just 28. When play resumed, Robertson made breaks of 61 and 132 to tie the scores at 3–3. Hawkins won frame seven with a cross double on the last green and went on to secure a 5–3 victory with a 93 break in frame eight, his only break over 40 in the match. He reached his first semi-final of the season. "I battled hard all the way through," said Hawkins. "My scoring wasn't there, though I potted some good balls towards the end of the frames and played some good safety. I was over the moon to be 3–1 up at the interval." Lisowski made breaks including 70 and 118 as he moved into a 4–0 lead over Bingham, who responded by winning frames five and six. However, Lisowski secured frame seven to complete a 5–2 victory and reach his 14th ranking semi-final. "At 4–0 I was waiting for [Bingham] to come back at me, then once it got to 4–2 I really didn't want it to go 4–3, so I was glad to get over the line and live to fight another day," he said afterwards.

Wu faced Jiang, who was attempting to reach his first ranking semi-final. Jiang made breaks including 68, 64, and 55 as he took a 4–1 lead, but Wu took frame six with a 71 break and also won frame seven. In frame eight, Jiang was on a break of 43 when he missed a red, and Wu produced a break of 89 to tie the scores at 4–4. Jiang had the first scoring opportunity in the deciding frame, but he missed the black on a break of 37 while playing with the rest, and Wu secured victory with a break of 65. "In the first half, I wasn't very focused and made some mistakes," said Wu afterwards. "During the interval I practised a bit and managed to find some of my form again in the second half, and that helped me finish the match." On reaching his sixth ranking semi-final, he added: "I've made big progress this year, experienced the later stages of tournaments a few times now and learned a lot of lessons from before. I hope I can do better this time." Higgins whitewashed Zhou, making breaks of 75 and 67 in the last two frames, to reach the 92nd ranking semi-final of his career. Zhou's defeat meant that Lisowski was the only player remaining in the tournament who could win the £150,000 Home Nations Series bonus, awarded to the player earning the most cumulative prize money across the season's four Home Nations events. Lisowski needed to beat Higgins in the semi-finals to secure the bonus, which otherwise would go to Allen. Higgins commented: "It will be [Lisowski's] biggest money match he has ever played. But I think he could be totally fine. It might give him that spark just to go out there and go for it."

==== Semi-finals ====
In the first semi-final, Hawkins faced Wu. Hawkins won the opening frame and was leading by 53 points in frame two when he went in-off, giving Wu the opportunity to take the frame with a clearance of 73. Hawkins won frame three with a 42 break after Wu missed a pot on the black and also won frames four and five with breaks of 72 and 66 to lead 4–1. In frame six, Hawkins miscued while playing a shot with the rest. Wu won the frame with an 83 break and followed up with breaks of 74 and 122 as he tied the scores at 4–4. Following a re-rack in frame nine, Wu was on a break of 59 when he missed a pot on the black, and Hawkins eventually won the frame with a clearance on the colours. Wu failed to pot a ball in the fragmented 10th frame, in which Hawkins made breaks including 24 and 25 as he secured a 6–4 victory. "Wu threw everything at me from 4–1," said Hawkins afterwards. "I played well up to 4–1, then when I miscued with the rest, that sparked him into life. I was just sitting in my seat, he was potting unbelievable balls and didn't look like missing. To get the chance at 4–4 when he missed the black from nowhere, that was a relief, and winning that frame settled me down." Wu commented: "It doesn't feel great because I had a clear chance to go 5–4 up. In the frames I won, I played very well and scored heavily, my scoring was really strong. It was just in the ninth frame, there was a black ball where I lost my concentration for a moment and made a mistake, which gave my opponent the chance to come back to the table."

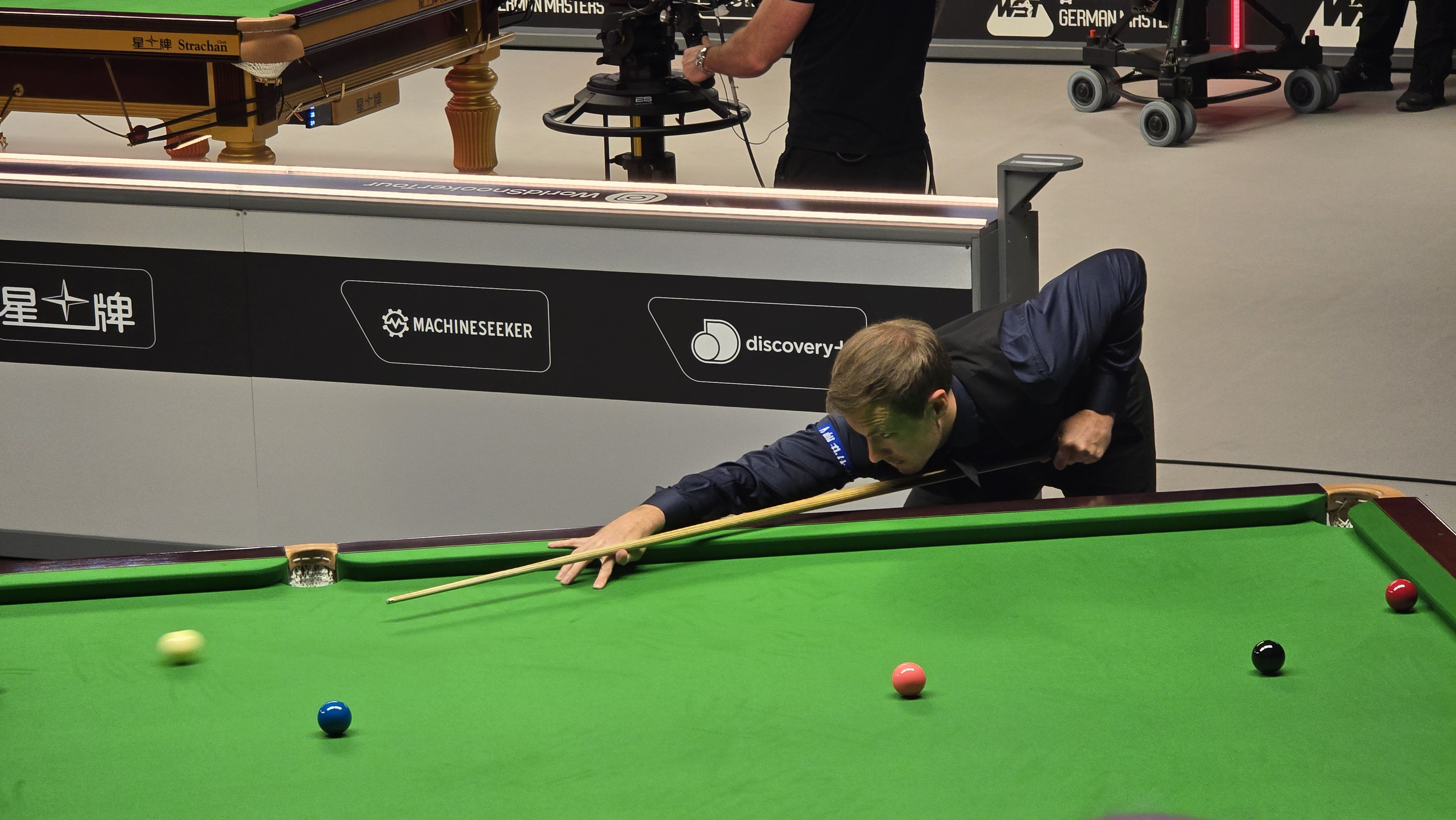
Jack Lisowski (pictured in 2025) defeated John Higgins 6–5 and secured the £150,000 Home Nations Series bonus.

In the second semi-final, Lisowski played five-time Welsh Open champion Higgins, who won the opening frame. Lisowski took the 30-minute second frame after a tactical battle on the colours, but Higgins won frame three with a 73 break and then took the fourth after laying a snooker on the last yellow, moving into a 3–1 lead at the mid-session interval. However, Higgins did not score in the following three frames as Lisowski made rapid successive breaks of 95, 79, and 138 to take a 4–3 lead. Higgins made an 82 break to win frame eight, but Lisowski took frame nine, making a 58 break after Higgins missed a long pot on the blue. Higgins took frame 10 to tie the scores at 5–5. Lisowski won the deciding frame with a 78 break that featured intricate positional shots, drawing comparisons with a break made by Alex Higgins in the 1982 World Championship semi-finals. Lisowski's semi-final win, following his victory at the 2025 Northern Ireland Open earlier in the season, secured him the £150,000 Home Nations Series bonus, the biggest prize of his career. "It feels amazing, what a match and what a frame," said Lisowski afterwards. "That's probably as much pressure as I am ever going to experience, and to make a break like that—it's the most satisfying frame I have ever played. I just kept potting and going for my shots. I have been so tense all day, thinking about the bonus. Now that is all released." He added: "It was an incredible game to be a part of. I really enjoyed it. It's very special for me because John Higgins was my idol. I'll never forget this match."

==== Final ====
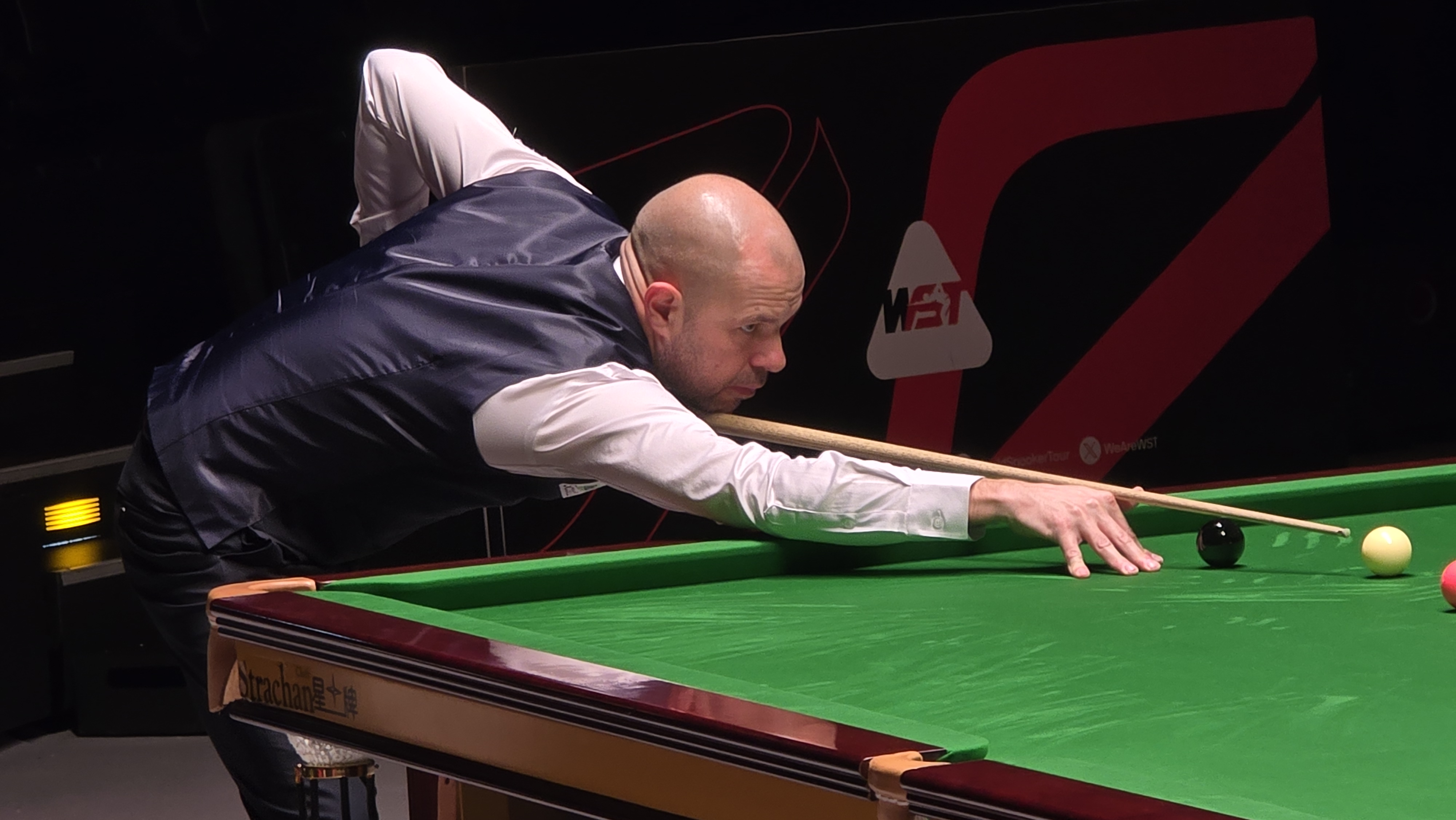
Barry Hawkins (pictured in 2026) won his first Welsh Open title and fifth ranking title with a 9–5 victory over Jack Lisowski.

The final took place on 1 March as the best of 17 frames, played over two sessions, between the 12th seed Hawkins and the 19th seed Lisowski. Hawkins was contesting his second Welsh Open final, having been runner-up to Higgins at the 2018 edition, while Lisowski played in the final of the tournament for the first time. It was Hawkins's 13th ranking final and Lisowski's eighth; it was also the first time the two players had faced each other in a professional final.

Hawkins won the opening frame with a century of 105, but Lisowski tied the scores by winning frame two. In frame three, Lisowski missed the black off its spot while on a break of 47. Hawkins produced a frame-winning clearance of 67 and then made a century of 102 in frame four to lead 3–1 at the mid-session interval. Hawkins won frame five after Lisowski made a safety error on the last brown, made breaks of 76 and 88 to win frames six and seven, and then made breaks of 39 and 25 to win frame eight. Hawkins ended the session with a 7–1 lead. When play resumed for the second session, Lisowski produced back-to-back centuries of 112 and 102 and then won the 47-minute 11th frame as he narrowed Hawkins's lead to 7–4. In frame 12, Hawkins fluked a red while playing a safety shot and went on to make a frame-winning break of 68. Lisowski took frame 13 with a 53 break, but Hawkins won frame 14 with breaks of 32 and 33, completing a 9–5 victory.

Hawkins won his first Welsh Open title and fifth ranking title. He advanced from 14th to ninth in the world rankings and from fifteenth to eighth on the one-year ranking list after the tournament, boosting his chances of qualifying for the 2026 Tour Championship. "It means the world," Hawkins said. "I came close last season to a couple of big titles. I feel I deserved this one because I have been knocking on the door for a while. I am so relieved because playing [Lisowski] is scary; he pots balls from everywhere and when he gets going he's a hard man to stop. At 7–1, it's for you to lose. Things start going through your head like it could be the biggest collapse of all time. People were getting excited but I know it's never over until it's over." Lisowski, who advanced from 22nd to 18th in the world rankings after the event, commented that he had been "very poor" in the first session and said that Hawkins had been "by far the better player" in the final. "He's a great guy and I'm happy for him," he added. "I couldn't sleep last night. The semi-final was like a final for me, I was so relieved to win and the way I won, to beat [Higgins]. But that takes nothing away from [Hawkins] today. There are no excuses and I gave it my best."

== Main draw ==
The results of the main draw are shown below. Numbers in parentheses after the players' names denote the top 32 seeds, and players in bold denote match winners.

=== Top half ===
**Last 64**; Best of 7 frames
Mark Selby (ENG) (1)	3
**Jiang Jun (CHN)**	**4**
**Yuan Sijun (CHN) (28)**	**4**
Julien Leclercq (BEL)	3
Si Jiahui (CHN) (13)	2
**Robbie Williams (ENG)**	**4**
**Stephen Maguire (SCO) (22)**	**4**
Ricky Walden (ENG)	3
**Joe O'Connor (ENG) (23)**	**4**
Aaron Hill (IRL)	0
**Wu Yize (CHN) (10)**	**4**
Ben Mertens (BEL)	0
Lei Peifan (CHN) (26)	3
**Dylan Emery (WAL)**	**4**
Mark Allen (NIR) (8)	2
**David Grace (ENG)**	**4**
**Mark Williams (WAL) (5)**	**4**
Michael Holt (ENG)	2
Tom Ford (ENG) (25)	2
**Martin O'Donnell (ENG)**	**4**
**Barry Hawkins (ENG) (12)**	**4**
David Lilley (ENG)	3
**Pang Junxu (CHN) (24)**	**4**
Antoni Kowalski (POL)	2
Ali Carter (ENG) (18)	3
**Anthony McGill (SCO)**	**4**
**Jak Jones (WAL) (16)**	**4**
Liam Highfield (ENG)	1
**Hossein Vafaei (IRN) (29)**	**4**
Artemijs Žižins (LAT)	1
**Neil Robertson (AUS) (4)**	**4**
Michał Szubarczyk (POL)	1

**Last 32**; Best of 7 frames
**(China) Jiang Jun**	**4**
(China) Yuan Sijun (28)	0
**(England) Robbie Williams**	**4**
(Scotland) Stephen Maguire (22)	3
(England) Joe O'Connor (23)	2
**(China) Wu Yize (10)**	**4**
(Wales) Dylan Emery	1
**(England) David Grace**	**4**
**(Wales) Mark Williams (5)**	**4**
(England) Martin O'Donnell	1
**(England) Barry Hawkins (12)**	**4**
(China) Pang Junxu (24)	2
(Scotland) Anthony McGill	2
**(Wales) Jak Jones (16)**	**4**
(Iran) Hossein Vafaei (29)	1
**(Australia) Neil Robertson (4)**	**4**

**Last 16**; Best of 7 frames
**(China) Jiang Jun**	**4**
(England) Robbie Williams	1
**(China) Wu Yize (10)**	**4**
(England) David Grace	0
(Wales) Mark Williams (5)	2
**(England) Barry Hawkins (12)**	**4**
(Wales) Jak Jones (16)	3
**(Australia) Neil Robertson (4)**	**4**

**Quarter-finals**; Best of 9 frames
(China) Jiang Jun	4
**(China) Wu Yize (10)**	**5**
**(England) Barry Hawkins (12)**	**5**
(Australia) Neil Robertson (4)	3

**Semi-finals**; Best of 11 frames
(China) Wu Yize (10)	4
**(England) Barry Hawkins (12)**	**6**

=== Bottom half ===
**Last 64**; Best of 7 frames
**Kyren Wilson (ENG) (3)**	**4**
Liu Hongyu (CHN)	1
**Zhou Yuelong (CHN) (27)**	**4**
Alexander Ursenbacher (SUI)	0
**Gary Wilson (ENG) (14)**	**4**
Amir Sarkhosh (IRN)	0
Elliot Slessor (ENG) (17)	3
**Sam Craigie (ENG)**	**4**
**Zhang Anda (CHN) (20)**	**4**
Mitchell Mann (ENG)	2
Chris Wakelin (ENG) (11)	3
**Liam Pullen (ENG)**	**4**
Ryan Day (WAL) (32)	3
**Bulcsú Révész (HUN)**	**4**
**John Higgins (SCO) (6)**	**4**
Liu Wenwei (CHN)	1
Shaun Murphy (ENG) (7)	0
**Chang Bingyu (CHN)**	**4**
**Jackson Page (WAL) (30)**	**4**
Luca Brecel (BEL)	0
**Xiao Guodong (CHN) (9)**	**4**
Long Zehuang (CHN)	3
**Jack Lisowski (ENG) (19)**	**4**
Louis Heathcote (ENG)	2
**David Gilbert (ENG) (21)**	**4**
Robbie McGuigan (NIR)	1
**Stuart Bingham (ENG) (15)**	**4**
Gao Yang (CHN)	2
Jimmy Robertson (ENG) (31)	0
**Stan Moody (ENG)**	**4**
**Zhao Xintong (CHN) (2)**	**4**
Fan Zhengyi (CHN)	3

**Last 32**; Best of 7 frames
(England) Kyren Wilson (3)	1
**(China) Zhou Yuelong (27)**	**4**
(England) Gary Wilson (14)	1
**(England) Sam Craigie**	**4**
**(China) Zhang Anda (20)**	**4**
(England) Liam Pullen	2
(Hungary) Bulcsú Révész	3
**(Scotland) John Higgins (6)**	**4**
(China) Chang Bingyu	3
**(Wales) Jackson Page (30)**	**4**
(China) Xiao Guodong (9)	3
**(England) Jack Lisowski (19)**	**4**
(England) David Gilbert (21)	2
**(England) Stuart Bingham (15)**	**4**
(England) Stan Moody	2
**(China) Zhao Xintong (2)**	**4**

**Last 16**; Best of 7 frames
**(China) Zhou Yuelong (27)**	**4**
(England) Sam Craigie	1
(China) Zhang Anda (20)	2
**(Scotland) John Higgins (6)**	**4**
(Wales) Jackson Page (30)	2
**(England) Jack Lisowski (19)**	**4**
**(England) Stuart Bingham (15)**	**4**
(China) Zhao Xintong (2)	2

**Quarter-finals**; Best of 9 frames
(China) Zhou Yuelong (27)	0
**(Scotland) John Higgins (6)**	**5**
**(England) Jack Lisowski (19)**	**5**
(England) Stuart Bingham (15)	2

**Semi-finals**; Best of 11 frames
(Scotland) John Higgins (6)	5
**(England) Jack Lisowski (19)**	**6**

=== Final: frame scores ===
Final: Best of 17 frames. Referee: Ben Williams; Venue Cymru, Llandudno, Wales, 1 March 2026
**Barry Hawkins** (12); England	**9**–5	Jack Lisowski (19); England
Afternoon: **105**–0 (105), 4–**68**, **67**–47, **102**–0 (102), **69**–52, **76**–28, **110**–0, **79**–9; Evening: 0–**118** (112), 10–**102** (102), 18–**59**, **76**–30, 1–**72**, **70**–1
(frame 1) 105	Highest break	**112** (frame 9)
2	Century breaks	2

== Qualifying rounds ==
The results of the early rounds are shown below. Numbers in parentheses after the players' names denote the players' seeding, an "a" indicates amateur players who were not on the main World Snooker Tour, and players in bold denote match winners.

**Round 1 (Last 128)**; Best of 7 frames
**Jiang Jun (CHN) (79)**	**4**
Florian Nuessle (AUT) (128)	2
**Julien Leclercq (BEL) (75)**	**4**
Ashley Hugill (ENG) (a)	2
**Marco Fu (HKG) (91)**	**4**
Xu Yichen (CHN) (112)	3
**Liam Davies (WAL) (73)**	**4**
Umut Dikme (GER) (a)	2
**Cheung Ka Wai (HKG) (83)**	**4**
Mateusz Baranowski (POL) (107)	3
**Iulian Boiko (UKR) (78)**	**4**
Chatchapong Nasa (THA) (115)	2
**Dylan Emery (WAL) (90)**	**4**
Yao Pengcheng (CHN) (106)	1
**David Grace (ENG) (92)**	**4**
Liam Graham (SCO) (108)	1
**Huang Jiahao (CHN) (81)**	**4**
Patrick Whelan (ENG) (a)	2
**Wang Yuchen (CHN) (65)**	**4**
Mink Nutcharut (THA) (120)	2
Sunny Akani (THA) (69)	1
**Jimmy White (ENG) (124)**	**4**
**Antoni Kowalski (POL) (68)**	**4**
Connor Benzey (ENG) (119)	0
**Haris Tahir (PAK) (84)**	**4**
Bai Yulu (CHN) (103)	3
**Liam Highfield (ENG) (89)**	**4**
Ng On-yee (HKG) (122)	0
**Artemijs Žižins (LVA) (72)**	**4**
Ross Muir (SCO) (109)	3
**Michał Szubarczyk (POL) (93)**	**4**
Hatem Yassen (EGY) (113)	0

**Round 2 (Last 96)**; Best of 7 frames
Oliver Lines (ENG) (55)	3
**Jiang Jun (CHN) (79)**	**4**
Ben Woollaston (ENG) (33)	3
**Julien Leclercq (BEL) (75)**	**4**
**Robbie Williams (ENG) (52)**	**4**
Marco Fu (HKG) (91)	3
**Ricky Walden (ENG) (45)**	**4**
Liam Davies (WAL) (73)	2
**Aaron Hill (IRL) (39)**	**4**
Cheung Ka Wai (HKG) (83)	3
**Ben Mertens (BEL) (64)**	**4**
Iulian Boiko (UKR) (78)	2
Xu Si (CHN) (36)	1
**Dylan Emery (WAL) (90)**	**4**
Ishpreet Singh Chadha (IND) (62)	1
**David Grace (ENG) (92)**	**4**
**Michael Holt (ENG) (58)**	**4**
Huang Jiahao (CHN) (81)	2
**Martin O'Donnell (ENG) (42)**	**4**
Wang Yuchen (CHN) (65)	3
**David Lilley (ENG) (49)**	**4**
Jimmy White (ENG) (124)	1
Thepchaiya Un-Nooh (THA) (37)	1
**Antoni Kowalski (POL) (68)**	**4**
**Anthony McGill (SCO) (44)**	**4**
Haris Tahir (PAK) (84)	2
Sanderson Lam (ENG) (63)	1
**Liam Highfield (ENG) (89)**	**4**
He Guoqiang (CHN) (41)	2
**Artemijs Žižins (LAT) (72)**	**4**
Jamie Jones (WAL) (57)	2
**Michał Szubarczyk (POL) (93)**	**4**

**Round 1 (Last 128)**; Best of 7 frames
**Duane Jones (WAL) (66)**	**4**
Kreishh Gurbaxani (IND) (123)	0
Steven Hallworth (ENG) (88)	3
**Alexander Ursenbacher (SUI) (117)**	**4**
**Amir Sarkhosh (IRN) (74)**	**4**
Riley Powell (WAL) (a)	3
**Sam Craigie (ENG) (86)**	**4**
Zhao Hanyang (CHN) (110)	1
**Mitchell Mann (ENG) (77)**	**4**
Fergal Quinn (NIR) (125)	3
**Liam Pullen (ENG) (80)**	**4**
Ken Doherty (IRL) (104)	1
**Bulcsú Révész (HUN) (82)**	**4**
Oliver Briffett-Payne (WAL) (a)	2
Gong Chenzhi (CHN) (67)	3
**Liu Wenwei (CHN) (111)**	**4**
Lan Yuhao (CHN) (96)	2
**Mohammed Shehab (UAE) (121)**	**4**
**Farakh Ajaib (PAK) (76)**	**4**
Leone Crowley (IRL) (116)	0
**Allan Taylor (ENG) (71)**	**4**
Oliver Brown (ENG) (118)	3
**Louis Heathcote (ENG) (70)**	**4**
Jonas Luz (BRA) (114)	1
**Robbie McGuigan** (NIR) (85)	**w/o**
Reanne Evans (ENG) (102)	w/d
Haydon Pinhey (ENG) (87)	2
**Gao Yang (CHN) (105)**	**4**
**Ian Burns (ENG) (94)**	**4**
Mahmoud El Hareedy (EGY) (129)	0
Chris Totten (SCO) (95)	2
**Sahil Nayyar (CAN) (126)**	**4**

**Round 2 (Last 96)**; Best of 7 frames
**Liu Hongyu (CHN) (56)**	**4**
Duane Jones (WAL) (66)	2
Matthew Selt (ENG) (34)	2
**Alexander Ursenbacher (SWI) (117)**	**4**
Scott Donaldson (SCO) (50)	3
**Amir Sarkhosh (IRN) (74)**	**4**
Lyu Haotian (CHN) (48)	3
**Sam Craigie (ENG) (86)**	**4**
Matthew Stevens (WAL) (46)	2
**Mitchell Mann (ENG) (77)**	**4**
Robert Milkins (ENG) (54)	3
**Liam Pullen (ENG) (80)**	**4**
Noppon Saengkham (THA) (35)	0
**Bulcsú Révész (HUN) (82)**	**4**
Mark Davis (ENG) (60)	2
**Liu Wenwei (CHN) (111)**	**4**
**Chang Bingyu (CHN) (59)**	**4**
Mohammed Shehab (UAE) (121)	1
**Luca Brecel (BEL) (40)**	**4**
Farakh Ajaib (PAK) (76)	3
**Long Zehuang (CHN) (51)**	**4**
Allan Taylor (ENG) (71)	2
Zak Surety (ENG) (43)	3
**Louis Heathcote (ENG) (70)**	**4**
Daniel Wells (WAL) (38)	1
**Robbie McGuigan (NIR) (85)**	**4**
Jordan Brown (NIR) (61)	1
**Gao Yang (CHN) (105)**	**4**
**Stan Moody (ENG) (47)**	**4**
Ian Burns (ENG) (94)	1
**Fan Zhengyi (CHN) (53)**	**4**
Sahil Nayyar (CAN) (126)	0

Note: w/d=withdrawn; w/o=walkover

== Century breaks ==
=== Main stage centuries ===
A total of 52 century breaks were made during the main stage of the tournament in Llandudno.

- 144 – John Higgins
- 138, 118, 112, 102 – Jack Lisowski
- 137, 123 – Mark Selby
- 136, 130, 130, 119 – Chang Bingyu
- 135, 119, 118 – Gary Wilson
- 134 – David Lilley
- 132, 122, 118, 102, 100 – Neil Robertson
- 132, 122, 111 – Zhao Xintong
- 128, 122, 120, 104 – Wu Yize
- 126 – Jak Jones
- 123 – David Gilbert
- 115 – Fan Zhengyi
- 115 – Mark Williams
- 115 – Zhang Anda
- 113 – Mitchell Mann
- 113 – Xiao Guodong
- 111, 110 – Sam Craigie
- 109 – Robbie Williams
- 108, 105, 102 – Barry Hawkins
- 108 – Joe O'Connor
- 107, 103, 100 – Liam Pullen
- 107 – Stan Moody
- 104 – Julien Leclercq
- 104 – Long Zehuang
- 102 – Yuan Sijun
- 101 – Jackson Page
- 101 – Zhou Yuelong
- 100 – Hossein Vafaei
- 100 – Kyren Wilson

=== Qualifying stage centuries ===
A total of 33 century breaks were made during the qualifying stage of the tournament in Sheffield.

- 139 – Lyu Haotian
- 136 – Long Zehuang
- 135 – Fan Zhengyi
- 127 – Mateusz Baranowski
- 123 – Cheung Ka Wai
- 120, 108 – Chang Bingyu
- 120 – Sam Craigie
- 119 – Huang Jiahao
- 118 – Ricky Walden
- 116 – Gao Yang
- 115 – Sanderson Lam
- 114, 111 – Michael Holt
- 111 – Martin O'Donnell
- 110, 109 – Ben Mertens
- 110, 100 – Dylan Emery
- 110 – Bai Yulu
- 110 – Liam Highfield
- 109 – Liam Davies
- 106 – Jimmy White
- 105, 101 – Artemijs Žižins
- 105 – Duane Jones
- 105 – Liu Hongyu
- 104 – Mark Davis
- 104 – Mitchell Mann
- 103 – Antoni Kowalski
- 102 – Liam Pullen
- 101 – Louis Heathcote
- 100 – Marco Fu
