= 2026 Players Championship (snooker) =

Snooker tournament

2026 Sportsbet.io Players Championship
- Part of the Players Series

Tournament information
- Dates: 17–22 February 2026
- Venue: Telford International Centre
- City: Telford
- Country: England
- Organisation: World Snooker Tour
- Format: Ranking event
- Total prize fund: £500,000
- Winner's share: £150,000
- Highest break: Zhao Xintong (CHN) (142)

Final
- Champion: Zhao Xintong (CHN)
- Runner-up: John Higgins (SCO)
- Score: 10–7

The 2026 Players Championship (officially the 2026 Sportsbet.io Players Championship) was a professional snooker tournament that took place from 17 to 22 February 2026 at the Telford International Centre in Telford, England. The top 16 players on the one-year ranking list, as it stood after the 2026 World Grand Prix, qualified for the event. The 10th consecutive staging of the Players Championship since it became a standalone tournament in 2017, it was the 14th ranking event of the 2025–26 snooker season, following the 2026 World Grand Prix and preceding the 2026 Welsh Open. It was the second of three events in the Players Series, following the 2026 World Grand Prix and preceding the 2026 Tour Championship. It was the first professional snooker tournament to be broadcast on 5 in the United Kingdom. It was also broadcast by TNT Sports in the UK and Ireland, by Eurosport in mainland Europe, by local channels in Asia and Africa, and by WST Play in all other territories. The winner received £150,000 from a total prize fund of £500,000.

Kyren Wilson won the 2025 edition, defeating Judd Trump 10–9 in the final, but he failed to qualify for the 2026 edition, having been 22nd on the one-year list at the cutoff. Ronnie O'Sullivan qualified but chose not to enter, which meant that John Higgins, at 17th on the one-year list, became eligible to compete. Higgins reached his 60th ranking final, becoming, at the age of 50 years and 280 days, the second-oldest finalist at any ranking tournament. The reigning World Champion Zhao Xintong defeated Higgins 10–7 to win his first Players Championship title and fifth ranking title. He became the fourth player to win his first five ranking finals, following Steve Davis, Mark Williams, and Neil Robertson. The tournament produced a total of 22 century breaks, of which the highest was a 142 by Zhao in his quarter-final match against Shaun Murphy.

== Overview ==
The tournament originated as the final of the Players Tour Championship, a former series of minor-ranking tournaments that was held in Europe and Asia from 2011 to 2016. In 2017, the event was rebranded as the Players Championship, a standalone tournament for the top 16 players on the one-year ranking list. The inaugural winner was Judd Trump, who defeated Marco Fu 10–8 in the 2017 final.

The 2026 edition of the tournament—its 10th consecutive staging since it became a standalone event in 2017—took place from 17 to 22 February at the Telford International Centre in Telford, England. It was the 14th ranking event of the 2025–26 snooker season, following the 2026 World Grand Prix and preceding the 2026 Welsh Open, and the second of three events in the Players Series, following the 2026 World Grand Prix and preceding the 2026 Tour Championship. Kyren Wilson defeated Judd Trump 10–9 in the 2025 final to win the title for the first time, but he failed to qualify for the 2026 edition, as he was ranked 22nd on the one-year ranking list at the cutoff point.

=== Format ===
All matches up to and including the semi-finals were played as the best of 11 frames. The final was the best of 19 frames, played over two sessions.

=== Seeding list ===
Unlike other events where the defending champion is seeded first, the reigning World Champion second, and the rest based on the world rankings, the qualification and seedings in the Players Series tournaments are determined by the one-year ranking list. The top 16 players on the list, as it stood after the 2026 World Grand Prix, automatically qualified for the tournament. Ronnie O'Sullivan qualified to compete, having been eighth on the list after the 2026 World Grand Prix, but he elected not to enter. This meant that John Higgins, ranked 17th on the list, became eligible to participate.

The below list shows the top 16 seeds for the event, determined by their ranking points earned from the beginning of the 2025–26 season until the conclusion of the 2026 World Grand Prix:

Seed	Player	Points
1	Neil Robertson (AUS)	620,300
2	Mark Selby (ENG)	399,350
3	Shaun Murphy (ENG)	364,900
4	Mark Williams (WAL)	309,800
5	Judd Trump (ENG)	304,350
6	Zhao Xintong (CHN)	293,500
7	Wu Yize (CHN)	271,300
8	Chris Wakelin (ENG)	239,800

Seed	Player	Points
9	Xiao Guodong (CHN)	213,000
10	Mark Allen (NIR)	202,350
11	Elliot Slessor (ENG)	190,300
12	Zhou Yuelong (CHN)	170,000
13	Barry Hawkins (ENG)	168,800
14	Zhang Anda (CHN)	165,400
15	Jack Lisowski (ENG)	165,400
16	John Higgins (SCO)	163,600

=== Broadcasters ===
The tournament was broadcast in the United Kingdom by 5, which televised a professional snooker tournament for the first time. It was broadcast in mainland Europe by Eurosport, with streaming coverage on Discovery+ in Germany, Italy, and Austria and on HBO Max in other European territories. It was broadcast in mainland China by Migu, Huya, the CBSA-WPBSA Academy WeChat channel, and CBSA-WPBSA Academy Douyin; in Hong Kong by Now TV; in Malaysia and Brunei by Astro SuperSport; in Taiwan by Sportcast; in Thailand by True Sports; in the Philippines by TAP Sports; and in Nigeria, South Africa, Ghana, and Kenya by SportyTV. In territories where no other coverage is available, it was broadcast by WST Play.

=== Prize fund ===
The event featured a prize fund of £500,000, with the winner receiving £150,000. The breakdown of prize money for the event is shown below:

- Winner: £150,000
- Runner-up: £70,000
- Semi-final: £35,000
- Quarter-final: £20,000
- Last 16: £15,000
- Highest break: £10,000
- Total: £500,000

== Summary ==
=== Last 16 ===
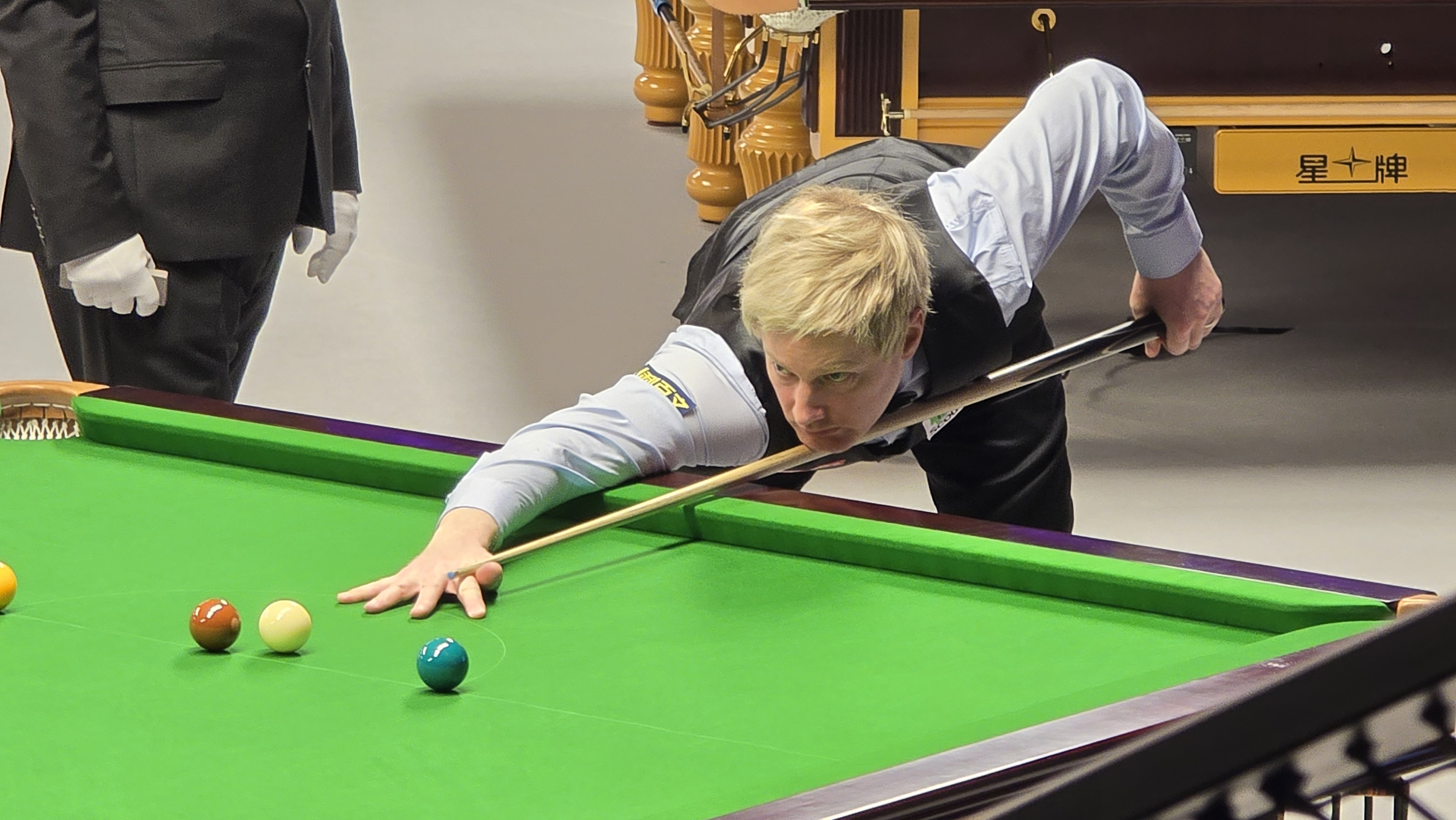
Neil Robertson (pictured in 2025) was the number one seed, but he lost 1–6 to John Higgins in the last 16.

John Higgins, who had agreed to join the 5 punditry and commentary team on a trial basis, became eligible to compete in the tournament as the 16th seed after Ronnie O'Sullivan chose not to enter. He made breaks including 70, 84, and 133 as he defeated the number one seed Neil Robertson 6–1, reaching the record-extending 155th ranking quarter-final of his professional career. Afterwards, he discussed the pros and cons of potentially improving his standing on the one-year ranking list and qualifying to defend his title at the 2026 Tour Championship. "It would be good to qualify for the Tour Championship, but if I do qualify and do well there I could be adding 70 to 80 frames into the tank going into the [2026 World Snooker Championship]," he stated. "Someone like myself, maybe doesn't have the energy for that. If I don't qualify then, who knows, it could end up helping me be a bit fresher." Mark Allen, a two-time winner of the event, made breaks including 51, 78, 73, and 93 as he defeated Wu Yize 6–3.

Mark Selby led Jack Lisowski 3–0 and 4–1. Lisowski made breaks including 56 and 70 as he reduced Selby's lead to 4–3, but Selby produced a total clearance of 136 in frame eight and went on to complete a 6–3 victory. "It is tough playing Jack [Lisowski] as you know he is going to be very attacking," Selby said afterwards. "If you leave a red sticking out, he is going to go for it. Depending on what kind of mood he is in, he can pot anything on the table and blow you away. Luckily for me he wasn't in that frame of mind." Commenting on his season to date, Selby said: "I'm really happy with my season so far. I played well [at the 2025 UK Championship] in York and won the [2025 Champion of Champions] as well. I've been consistent since then. I can't complain with how things are going." Chris Wakelin took a 4–2 lead over Xiao Guodong and then made back-to-back century breaks of 104 and 101 to complete a 6–2 win.

Shaun Murphy played Zhang Anda. After winning a close opening frame, Murphy attempted a maximum break in frame two, potting 15 reds and 15 blacks before snookering himself on the yellow, ending the break on 120. Murphy made further breaks of 88 and 81 as he secured a 6–1 victory. After the match, he spoke about working with Peter Ebdon as a coach and mentor. "It has been a journey since Peter joined the team 18 months ago," he said. "One of the first things he said was that I needed to up my work rate. That I needed to work hard enough so I deserve it. I've always been a hard practiser, but I perhaps had started to enjoy my life a little bit too much. I've gone back to basics in the last 18 months." Judd Trump, recent winner of the 2026 German Masters, produced breaks of 61, 69, 63, 117, and 75 as he recorded a whitewash victory over Zhou Yuelong.

Elliot Slessor made breaks including 119, 79, 50, and 64 as he moved into a 5–2 lead over the reigning World Champion Zhao Xintong. However, Zhao fluked a blue in frame eight and went on to make a century of 117. He then produced breaks of 62 and 59 to win the next two frames, tying the scores at 5–5. Both players had chances to win the decider, but Zhao eventually secured the frame and match with a break of 65. "Tonight I didn't play very well," Zhao said afterwards. "I know [Slessor] is a very good player and it was always going to be a tough game. He played so well in the first frames and his long potting was so good. I didn't have many chances. When he was one frame away he missed some balls and I tried to come back." Mark Williams made breaks including 64 and 101 as he took a 5–2 lead over Barry Hawkins. Williams then won the eighth frame on the last black to complete a 6–2 victory.

=== Quarter-finals ===
In the first quarter-final, Higgins played Wakelin. After Higgins won a lengthy first frame on the last black, Wakelin tied the scores with an 83 break in frame two. The scores were level at 2–2 at the mid-session interval. In frame five, Wakelin missed three chances to pot a frame ball brown, and Higgins took the frame on the last black. Wakelin won frame six to tie the scores at 3–3, but Higgins then made breaks including 53 and 108 as he won three consecutive frames for a 6–3 victory. "I'm absolutely delighted," said Higgins afterwards. "Before the mid-session we were missing a few and it was catching. After the interval I thought there was a better standard. It was a tough game. I've got the utmost respect for Chris [Wakelin] and how he has improved in the game. His all-round play and his safety play was a lot better than mine today."

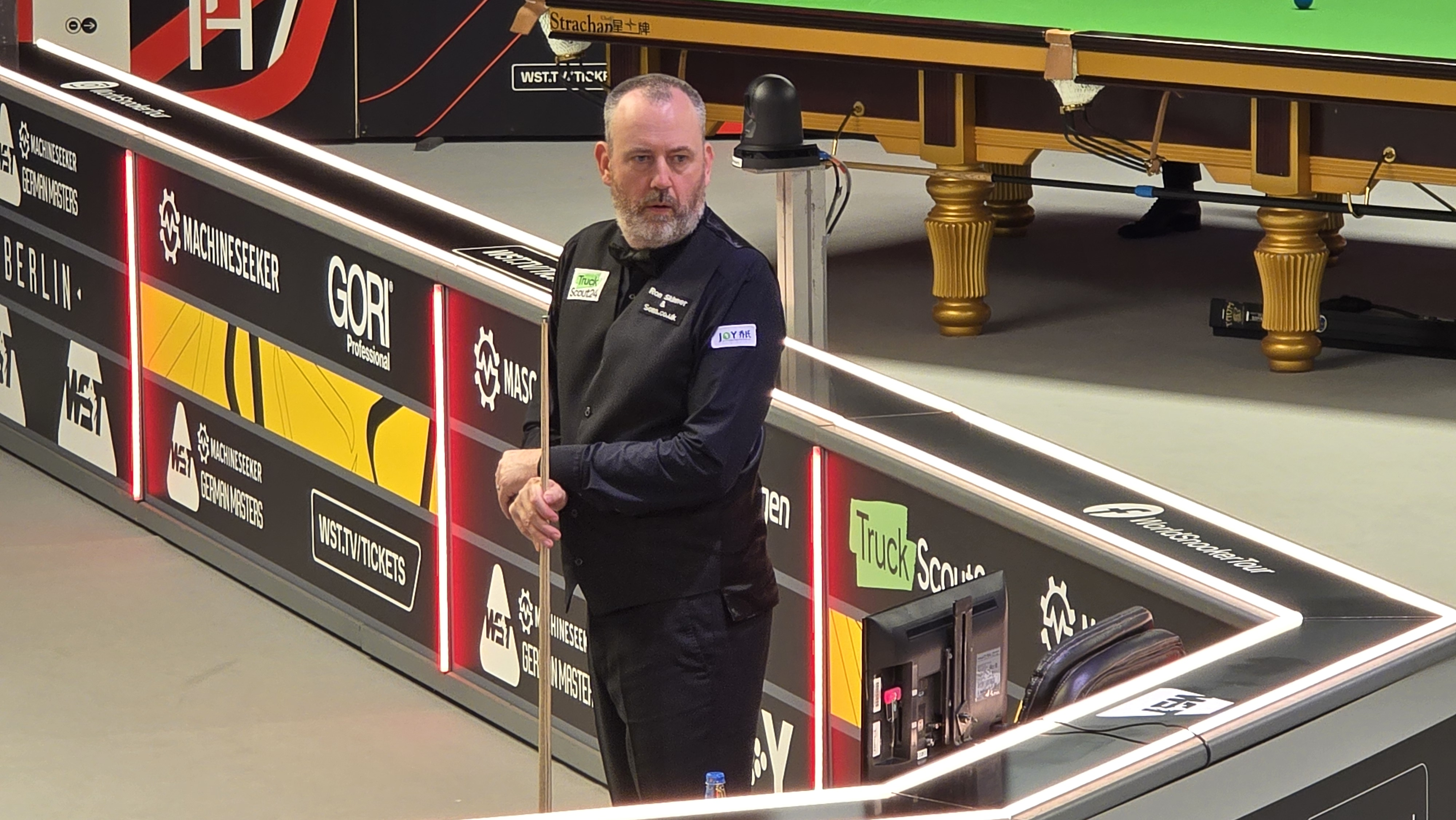
Mark Williams (pictured in 2025) lost to Judd Trump despite having a 97% pot success rate in the match.

Trump faced Williams, who won the first frame with a total clearance of 141. Trump responded with breaks including 52 and 75 as he won four consecutive frames to lead 4–1. Williams made breaks of 53 and 105 as he reduced Trump's lead to 4–3, but Trump completed a 6–3 victory with breaks of 70 and 123. "When I was in the game I kind of knew how well I was playing," Trump said afterwards. "My safety was good and my break-offs were very good. I was putting him in a lot of trouble from the start of the frame. That was a pattern of the whole game. I was able to dictate the safety a bit better." Williams, who had a pot success rate of 97% in the match, commented: "That is as good as I've ever seen anyone play against me. Up there with O'Sullivan, Higgins, all of them. I played alright there. No part of my game was poor and I lost 6–3. It shows how good [Trump] is."

Zhao and Murphy were tied at 2–2 at the mid-session interval, but Zhao then won three consecutive frames, making breaks including 142 and 95 as he took a 5–2 lead. Murphy won frame eight, but Zhao made a century of 118 to win the match 6–3. "I'm really happy with my performance," Zhao said afterwards. "I know Shaun [Murphy] is a very good long potter and that if I gave him a chance I would be in trouble. I'm happy to be in the semi-finals." Murphy expressed frustration after the match that his opponents appeared to be playing exceptionally well against him. "Who likes losing? I'm very frustrated. Again, someone has played out of their skin against me," he said. "That is not the Zhao Xintong that was here a couple of days ago against Elliot Slessor. There is nothing I can do about that. It keeps happening week after week and all I can do is my best. I don't think I did a great deal wrong. I thought Zhao Xintong was, in the middle of the match especially, unplayable."

Facing Selby, Allen made breaks of 70, 67, 53, 74, and 130 as he moved 5–0 ahead. Selby won the next two frames with breaks of 127 and 91. The lengthy eighth frame came down to a tactical battle on the yellow, which ended when Selby conceded a free ball. Allen secured the frame for a 6–2 win, which was his third consecutive victory over Selby. "[The final frame] was a fun challenge," said Allen. "There is more to the game than scoring and winning in one visit. The traditionalists and the purists enjoy that side of the game too. Even though I got the better of that one tonight, there is no doubt in my mind that [Selby] is the best there has ever been at [tactical play]. He is so clever and sets you into traps. I felt I held my own tonight. Even though he was 5–0 down he suddenly put me under it. There was only a shot or two from it being 5–3. That was nearly an hour-long frame and not many people win those against Selby."

=== Semi-finals ===
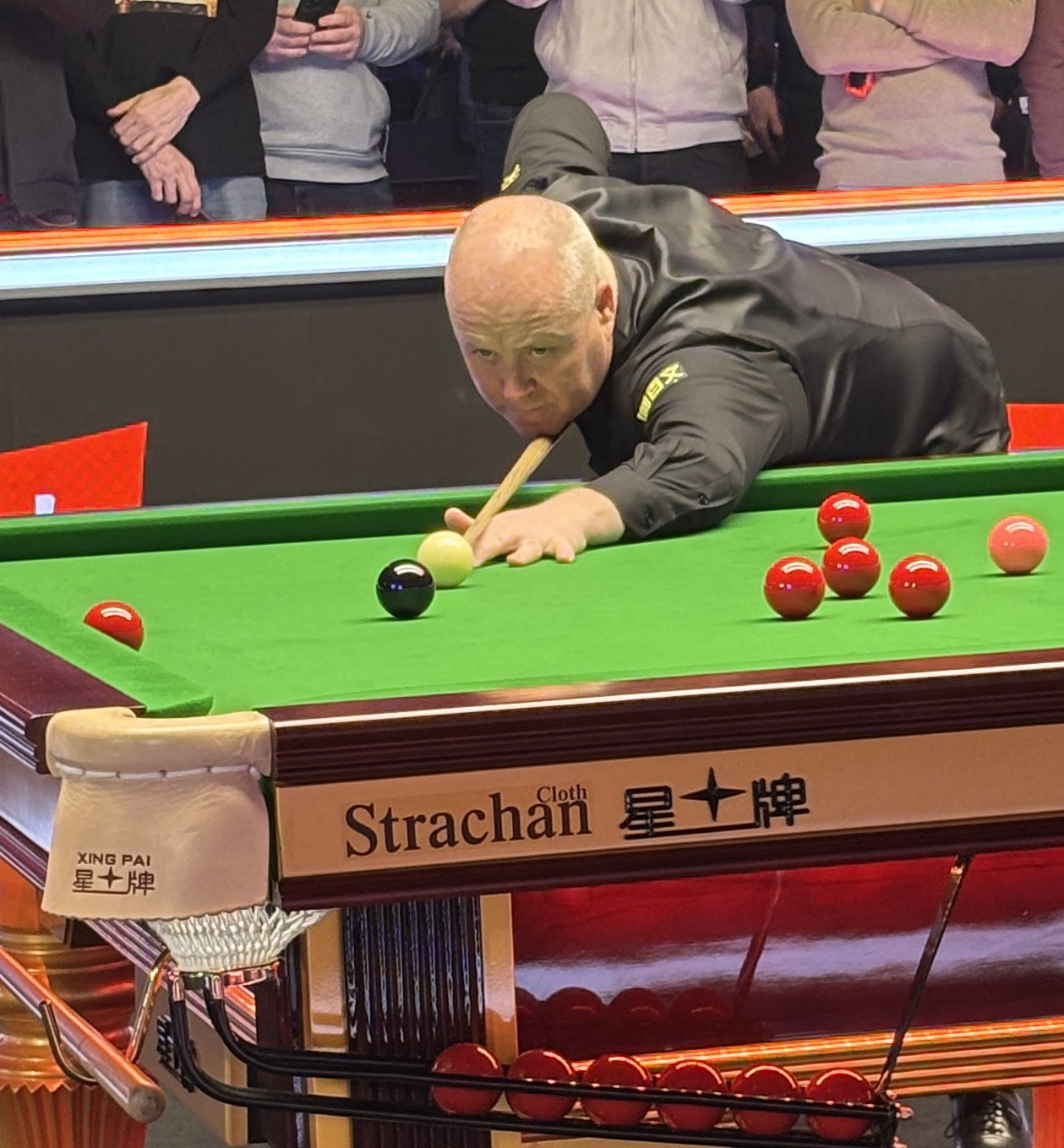
John Higgins (pictured in 2026) reached his 60th ranking final and became the sport's second-oldest ranking finalist.

Facing Trump in the first semi-final, Higgins made breaks including 71, 57, and 76 as he took a 4–1 lead. Trump won the next two frames, but Higgins took frame eight to lead 5–3. In frame nine, Higgins required two snookers but was awarded a free ball after a foul by Trump, giving him the chance to win the match. However, Higgins missed his nominated free ball, and Trump reduced his deficit to one at 5–4. In frame 10, Higgins had another match-winning opportunity but missed frame ball, a pink to the middle pocket, and Trump took the frame on the last black to level at 5–5. In the decider, Higgins made a long pot from Trump's break-off, but fouled by potting a red while going into the pack from the blue. Trump scored 39 points before missing a red while bridging awkwardly over another red, and Higgins secured victory with a 65 break. "That was incredible how it transpired at the end," said Higgins afterwards. "You just get into that zone in these moments. I was thinking clearly and I couldn't hear the crowd. I was thinking really well and it was a great moment for me to clear up in that final frame."

In the second semi-final, Zhao played Allen, the first time they had faced each other at a ranking event since Allen defeated Zhao 6–4 at the 2017 International Championship. Allen produced breaks including 107 and 55 as he took a 3–1 lead, but Zhao made a century of 140 to win frame five. Allen took the next, but Zhao made breaks of 103 and 58 to tie the scores at 4–4. Allen made a 90 break to move into a 5–4 lead, but Zhao tied the scores at 5–5 and went on to win the deciding frame with a 56 break after a safety error from Allen. "I don't think either [Allen] or I played at our very best today, but I'm very happy that I managed to get the win," Zhao said afterwards. "I actually had quite a few chances, especially in the last two frames when [Allen] made some costly mistakes that gave me opportunities. My positional play wasn't smooth and I needed several visits to finally get over the line."

=== Final ===
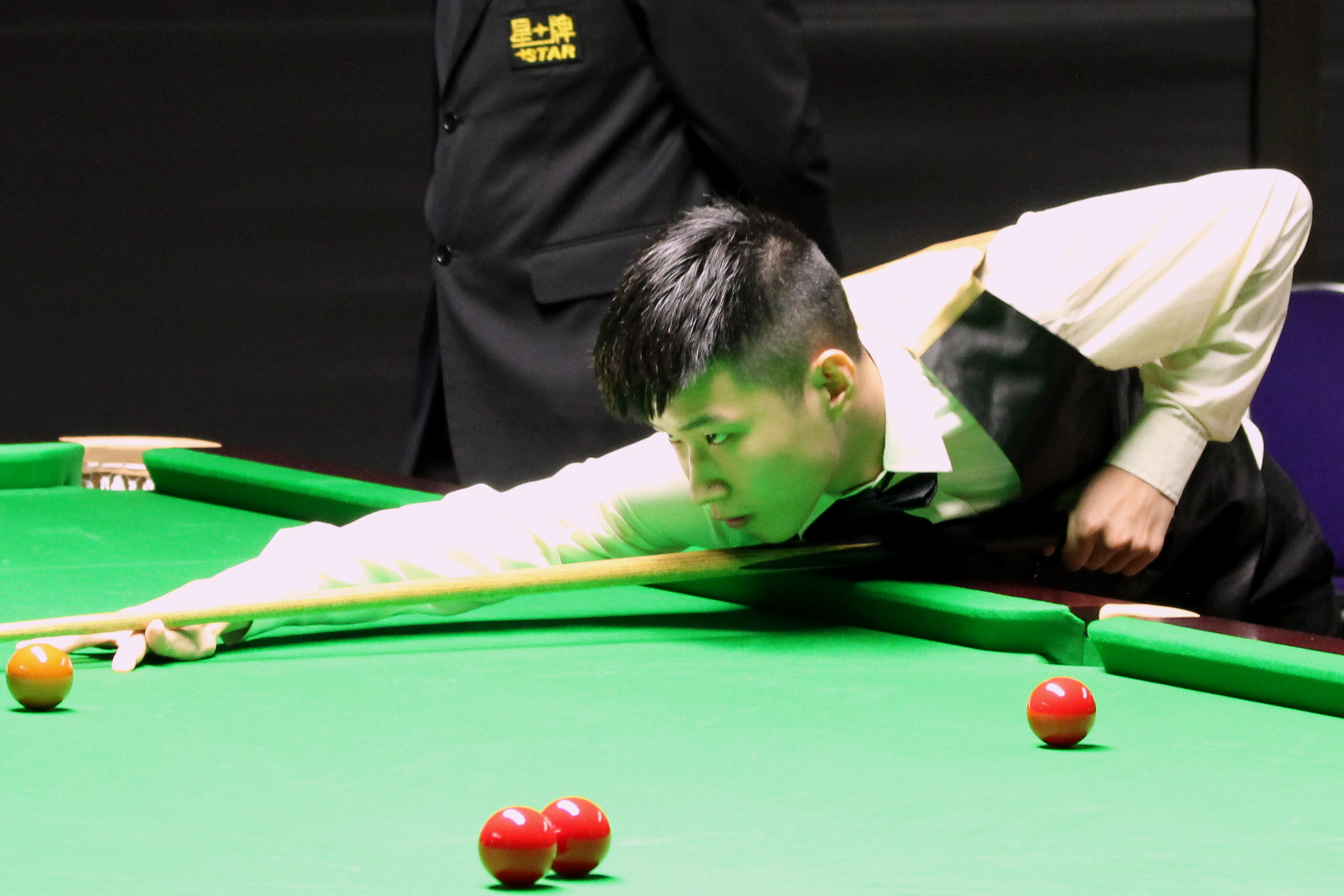
The reigning World Champion Zhao Xintong (pictured in 2016) won his first Players Championship title and fifth ranking title. He became the fourth player to win all of his first five ranking finals.

The final took place on 22 February as the best of 19 frames, played over two sessions, between the sixth seed and reigning World Champion Zhao and the 16th seed Higgins. Zhao played in his first Players Championship final, while Higgins contested his second, having previously won the title at the 2021 edition. It was Zhao's fifth ranking final and Higgins's 60th. At the age of 50 years and 280 days, Higgins was the second-oldest finalist at any ranking tournament, surpassed only by Rex Williams, who was aged 53 years and 98 days when he lost 6–10 to Jimmy White in the final of the 1986 Grand Prix. Excluding Championship League encounters, Higgins had won seven of the eleven previous professional matches between the two players.

Higgins won the opening two frames, but Zhao secured the next two to tie the scores at 2–2 at the mid-session interval. Higgins took frame five with an 83 break, but Zhao won frame six. A maximum break attempt by Zhao in frame seven ended on 81 but secured him a 4–3 lead. Higgins won frame eight with a 90 break to tie the scores at 4–4 after the first session. When play resumed for the second session, Higgins won the 47-minute ninth frame, but Zhao made breaks of 83 and 88 as he won two of the next three to tie the scores at 6–6 at the mid-session interval. Higgins cleared from the penultimate red to win frame 13 on the last black after Zhao missed frame ball, but Zhao then won four consecutive frames, making breaks of 104, 126, and 92 in the last three frames to secure a 10–7 victory. It was his first Players Championship title and fifth ranking final, making him the fourth player to win all of his first five ranking finals, following Steve Davis, Williams, and Neil Robertson. He won back-to-back ranking titles, following his victory at the 2026 World Grand Prix two weeks earlier, and advanced to a career high of fifth in the world rankings.

"I'm over the moon," Zhao said afterwards. "Honestly, I didn't expect to adjust my form so quickly after coming back from [the 2026 World Grand Prix in] Hong Kong. In fact, I was still dealing with jet lag for the first couple of days. I didn't expect that my mindset would settle down so well afterwards. That gave me a lot of confidence in the later matches. Even though my opponents were very strong, I felt I could beat them. This result is something really special for me." Higgins commented: "I couldn't pot a long ball all day and Zhao doesn't really miss any long balls. The last three frames there were absolutely poetry in motion. I'm lucky to have my kids here and I can remember my dad saying he was lucky to see footballers like George Best and Jimmy Johnstone. My kids are lucky to see someone like [Zhao]. He is an absolute genius."

== Tournament draw ==
Numbers in parentheses after the players' names denote the players' seedings, and players in bold denote match winners. All matches were played as the best of 11 frames except the final, which was played as the best of 19 frames.

**First round** Best of 11 frames
Neil Robertson (AUS) (1)	1
**John Higgins (SCO) (16)**	**6**
**Chris Wakelin (ENG) (8)**	**6**
Xiao Guodong (CHN) (9)	2
**Judd Trump (ENG) (5)**	**6**
Zhou Yuelong (CHN) (12)	0
**Mark Williams (WAL) (4)**	**6**
Barry Hawkins (ENG) (13)	2
**Shaun Murphy (ENG) (3)**	**6**
Zhang Anda (CHN) (14)	1
**Zhao Xintong (CHN) (6)**	**6**
Elliot Slessor (ENG) (11)	5
Wu Yize (CHN) (7)	3
**Mark Allen (NIR) (10)**	**6**
**Mark Selby (ENG) (2)**	**6**
Jack Lisowski (ENG) (15)	3

**Quarter-finals**; Best of 11 frames
**(Scotland) John Higgins (16)**	**6**
(England) Chris Wakelin (8)	3
**(England) Judd Trump (5)**	**6**
(Wales) Mark Williams (4)	3
(England) Shaun Murphy (3)	3
**(China) Zhao Xintong (6)**	**6**
**(Northern Ireland) Mark Allen (10)**	**6**
(England) Mark Selby (2)	2

**Semi-finals**; Best of 11 frames
**(Scotland) John Higgins (16)**	**6**
(England) Judd Trump (5)	5
**(China) Zhao Xintong (6)**	**6**
(Northern Ireland) Mark Allen (10)	5

**Final**; Best of 19 frames
(Scotland) John Higgins (16)	7
**(China) Zhao Xintong (6)**	**10**

=== Final: frame scores ===
Final: Best of 19 frames. Referee: Marcel Eckardt; Telford International Centre, Telford, England, 22 February 2026
John Higgins (16); Scotland	7–**10**	**Zhao Xintong** (6); China
Afternoon: **65**–0, **82**–36, 0–**121**, 0–**66**, **83**–0, 0–**82**, 0–**81**, **111**–11; Evening: **73**–38, 14–**88**, **71**–44, 14–**116**, **77**–71, 14–**72**, 0–**104** (104), 0–**140** (126), 0–**92**
(frame 8) 90	Highest break	**126** (frame 16)
0	Century breaks	**2**

== Century breaks ==
A total of 22 century breaks were made during the tournament.

- 142, 140, 126, 118, 117, 104, 103 – Zhao Xintong
- 141, 105, 101 – Mark Williams
- 136, 127 – Mark Selby
- 133, 108 – John Higgins
- 130, 107 – Mark Allen
- 123, 117 – Judd Trump
- 120 – Shaun Murphy
- 119 – Elliot Slessor
- 104, 101 – Chris Wakelin
