= 2026 World Grand Prix (snooker) =

Snooker tournament

- Part of the Players Series

Tournament information
- Dates: 3–8 February 2026
- Venue: Kai Tak Arena, Hong Kong
- Organisation: World Snooker Tour
- Format: Ranking event
- Total prize fund: £700,000
- Winner's share: £180,000
- Highest break: Zhao Xintong (CHN) (145)

Final
- Champion: Zhao Xintong (CHN)
- Runner-up: Zhang Anda (CHN)
- Score: 10–6

The 2026 World Grand Prix was a professional snooker tournament that took place from 3 to 8 February 2026 at the Kai Tak Arena, Hong Kong. It featured the top 32 players on the one-year ranking list, as it stood after the 2025 Scottish Open. The 12th edition of the tournament since it was first staged in 2015, it was the 13th ranking event of the 2025–26 snooker season, following the 2026 German Masters and preceding the 2026 Players Championship. It was the first of three events in the Players Series, preceding the 2026 Players Championship and the 2026 Tour Championship. The tournament was broadcast by TNT Sports and Discovery+ in the United Kingdom and Ireland, by Eurosport in mainland Europe, by local channels in Asia, and by WST Play in all other territories. The winner received £180,000 from a total prize fund of £700,000.

Neil Robertson was the defending champion, having defeated Stuart Bingham 10–0 in the 2025 final, but he lost 1–5 to Jak Jones in the last 32. The tournament set records for the number of players from mainland China in the latter stages of a ranking event, with a record nine reaching the last 16 and a record six advancing to the quarter-finals. For the first time at any ranking tournament, all four semi-finalists were from mainland China. The reigning World Champion Zhao Xintong made five century breaks in the final as he defeated Zhang Anda 10–6 to win his first World Grand Prix title and fourth ranking title. The tournament produced a total of 37 centuries, of which the highest was a 145 by Zhao in the final.

== Overview ==
The World Grand Prix is a professional ranking snooker tournament that was first staged in 2015 as a non-ranking event; the inaugural champion was Judd Trump, who came from 4–7 behind to defeat Ronnie O'Sullivan 10–7 in the final. The tournament became a ranking event the following year. In 2019, it became one of three tournaments in the Players Series, together with the Players Championship and the Tour Championship. Held in Wales in 2015 and 2016 and in England from 2017 to 2024, the tournament moved to Hong Kong in 2025.

The 2026 edition of the tournament—its 12th staging since the inaugural edition in 2015—took place from 3 to 8 February at the Kai Tak Arena, Hong Kong. It was the 13th ranking event of the 2025–26 snooker season, following the 2026 German Masters and preceding the 2026 Players Championship. It was the first of three events in the Players Series, preceding the 2026 Players Championship and the 2026 Tour Championship. Neil Robertson was the defending champion, having defeated Stuart Bingham 10–0 in the 2025 final to win his second World Grand Prix title.

=== Format ===
Matches were played as the best of 9 frames up to and including the quarter-finals. The semi-finals were the best of 11 frames, and the final was the best of 19 frames, played over two sessions.

=== Seeding list ===
The tournament featured the top 32 players on the one-year ranking list as it stood after the 2025 Scottish Open. Unlike other events where the defending champion is seeded first, the reigning World Champion second, and the rest based on the world rankings, the qualification and seedings in the Players Series tournaments are determined by the one-year ranking list. The below list shows the top 32 players who earned the most ranking points from the beginning of the 2025–26 season until the conclusion of the 2025 Scottish Open:

Seed	Player	Points
1	Neil Robertson (AUS)	589,300
2	Mark Selby (ENG)	378,950
3	Shaun Murphy (ENG)	309,900
4	Mark Williams (WAL)	294,400
5	Wu Yize (CHN)	251,300
6	Ronnie O'Sullivan (ENG)	231,350
7	Chris Wakelin (ENG)	219,800
8	Judd Trump (ENG)	194,350
9	Mark Allen (NIR)	183,350
10	Elliot Slessor (ENG)	169,900
11	Xiao Guodong (CHN)	164,800
12	Jack Lisowski (ENG)	150,000
13	Barry Hawkins (ENG)	148,400
14	Gary Wilson (ENG)	146,900
15	John Higgins (SCO)	144,600
16	Zhou Yuelong (CHN)	129,600

Seed	Player	Points
17	Stephen Maguire (SCO)	122,800
18	Zhao Xintong (CHN)	108,150
19	Si Jiahui (CHN)	106,200
20	Ding Junhui (CHN)	104,850
21	Chang Bingyu (CHN)	104,100
22	Kyren Wilson (ENG)	102,700
23	Stuart Bingham (ENG)	97,900
24	Ali Carter (ENG)	90,250
25	Yuan Sijun (CHN)	89,300
26	Thepchaiya Un-Nooh (THA)	83,500
27	Joe O'Connor (ENG)	83,050
28	Anthony McGill (SCO)	82,600
29	Zhang Anda (CHN)	76,400
30	Pang Junxu (CHN)	71,700
31	Aaron Hill (IRL)	70,700
32	Jak Jones (WAL)	70,000

=== Broadcasters ===
The tournament was broadcast in the United Kingdom and Ireland by TNT Sports and Discovery+. It was broadcast in mainland Europe by Eurosport, with streaming coverage on Discovery+ in Germany, Italy, and Austria and on HBO Max in other European territories. It was broadcast in mainland China by Migu, Huya, the CBSA-WPBSA Academy WeChat channel, and CBSA-WPBSA Academy Douyin; in Hong Kong by Now TV; in Malaysia and Brunei by Astro SuperSport; in Taiwan by Sportcast; in Thailand by True Sports; and in the Philippines by TAP Sports. In territories where no other coverage was available, it was broadcast by WST Play.

=== Prize fund ===
The breakdown of prize money for the event is shown below:

- Winner: £180,000
- Runner-up: £80,000
- Semi-final: £35,000
- Quarter-final: £20,000
- Last 16: £15,000
- Last 32: £10,000
- Highest break: £10,000
- Total: £700,000

== Summary ==
=== Last 32 ===
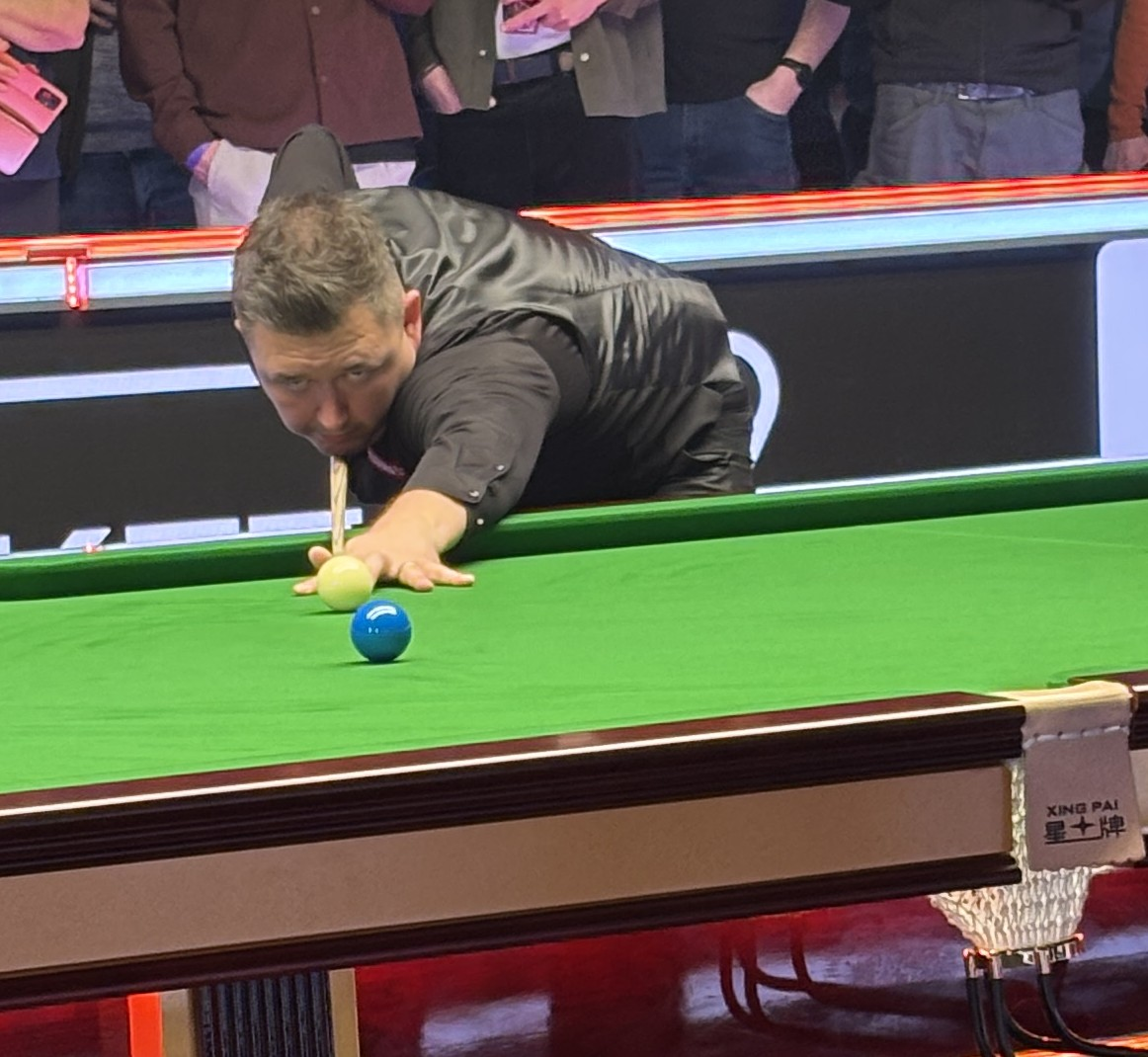
Kyren Wilson (pictured in 2026) lost to Xiao Guodong and did not qualify to defend his title at the 2026 Players Championship.

Xiao Guodong faced Kyren Wilson, recent winner of the 2026 Masters. Xiao made a break of 87 to win the opening frame, but Wilson tied the scores with an 83 break in frame two. Xiao won frame three with an 86 break, recovered from 56 points behind to win frame four, and then took frame five on the colours as he moved into a 4–1 lead. Wilson won frame six, but Xiao secured a 5–2 victory in frame seven. The result meant that Wilson remained outside the top 16 on the one-year ranking list after the event and did not qualify to defend his title at the 2026 Players Championship. "It was very hard because [Wilson] is a top player," said Xiao afterwards. "I had to keep my concentration as there were a lot of close frames." Zhou Yuelong made a century break of 116 as he defeated Stephen Maguire 5–2, and Elliot Slessor won five frames in a row to beat the previous year's runner-up Stuart Bingham by the same score. Mark Selby made breaks of 60, 100, 82, 94, and 76 in a whitewash victory over Aaron Hill.

Wu Yize trailed Anthony McGill 1–3 but made breaks of 65 and 77 to tie the scores at 3–3. In frame seven, Wu attempted a maximum break but missed a double on the last red, ending the break on 112. Wu completed a 5–3 win with an 81 break in frame eight. Chang Bingyu also trailed Jack Lisowski 1–3 but recovered to win the match in a deciding frame. Zhang Anda made breaks including 57, 124, 76, and 75 as he beat Mark Williams 5–2, while Barry Hawkins made a 141 break as he defeated Ding Junhui 5–3. "Any time you beat Ding here with the support he gets is good for confidence," Hawkins commented afterwards. "I was all over the place for the first four frames, cueing terribly, I was lucky to be 2–2 rather than 3–1 down. After the interval I was more aggressive and cued a lot better."

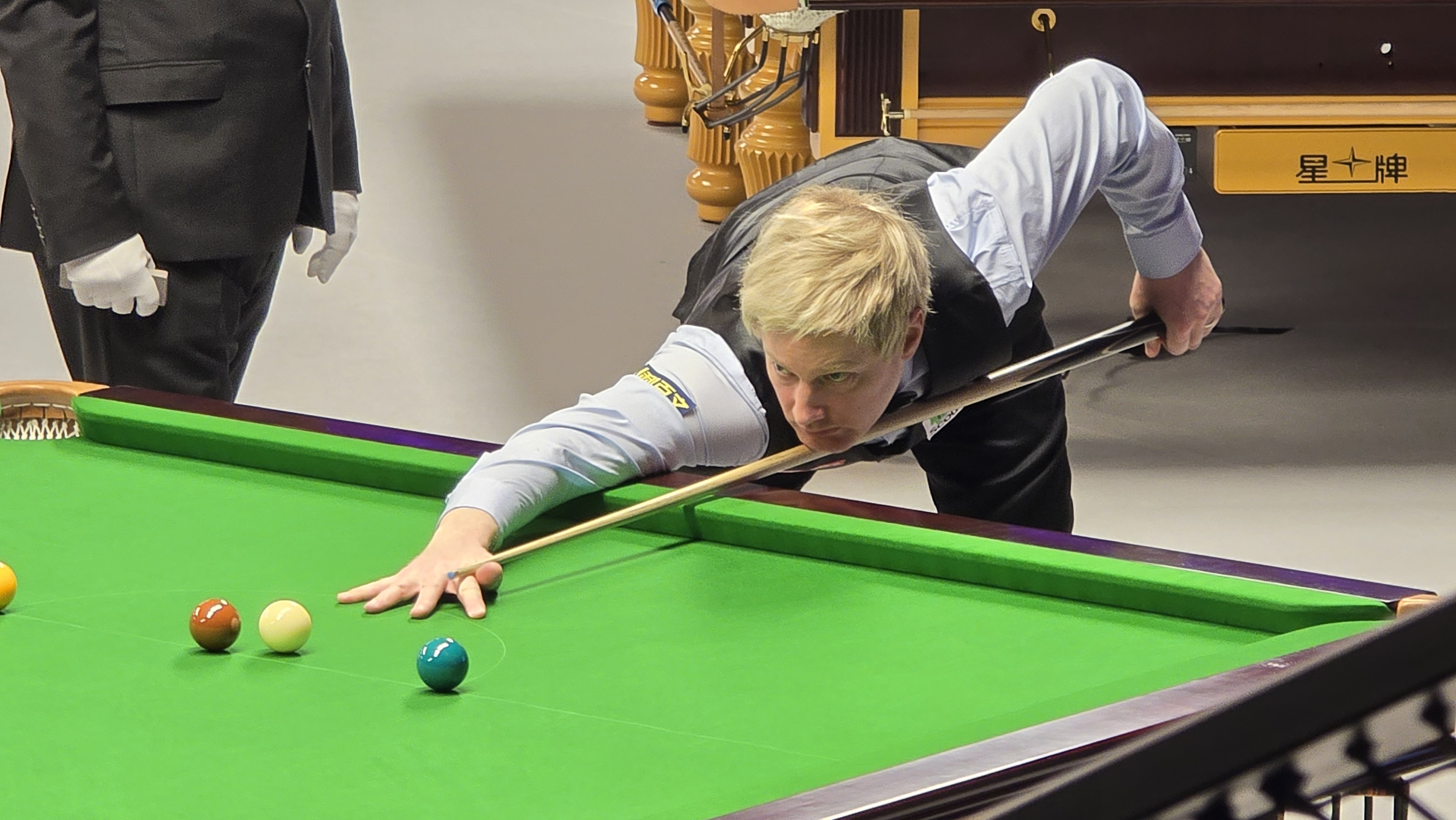
The defending champion Neil Robertson (pictured in 2025) lost 1–5 to Jak Jones.

The defending champion Neil Robertson lost 1–5 to Jak Jones, who had recently returned to competition after injuring his right hand. "The hand is still painful but it is healing well," Jones said afterwards. "I broke two of the bones and that's not an injury you want as a snooker player." The world number one Judd Trump, who had won the 2026 German Masters final three days before, lost 2–5 to the world number 31 Yuan Sijun. Si Jiahui beat Gary Wilson, also by a 5–2 scoreline, while Chris Wakelin whitewashed Thepchaiya Un-Nooh. Ali Carter recovered from 1–3 behind to beat Mark Allen in a deciding frame, and Pang Junxu made breaks including 73, 134, and 130 as he defeated Shaun Murphy 5–1.

The reigning World Champion Zhao Xintong lost two of the first three frames against John Higgins but then made breaks including 60, 121, and 73 as he took a 4–3 lead. Frame eight went to a re-spotted black, which Zhao potted to secure a 5–3 win. "Towards the end, [Higgins] gave me a few relatively easier chances and I managed to take them, so I think I was quite fortunate today," said Zhao afterwards. "I just tried to play in the way I normally do and stick to the style I believe in. I have confidence in my own game, and I feel that if I can perform to my normal level and show my form, then I can beat anyone." Ronnie O'Sullivan lost the first two frames against Joe O'Connor but won five of the next six, making breaks including 65, 72, and 72 as he secured a 5–3 victory. "I don't think a lack of sharpness is my problem because I have always played less tournaments than other players," said O'Sullivan afterwards. "I think my bad game is a lot worse than it used to be, and my good is not as good."

=== Last 16 ===
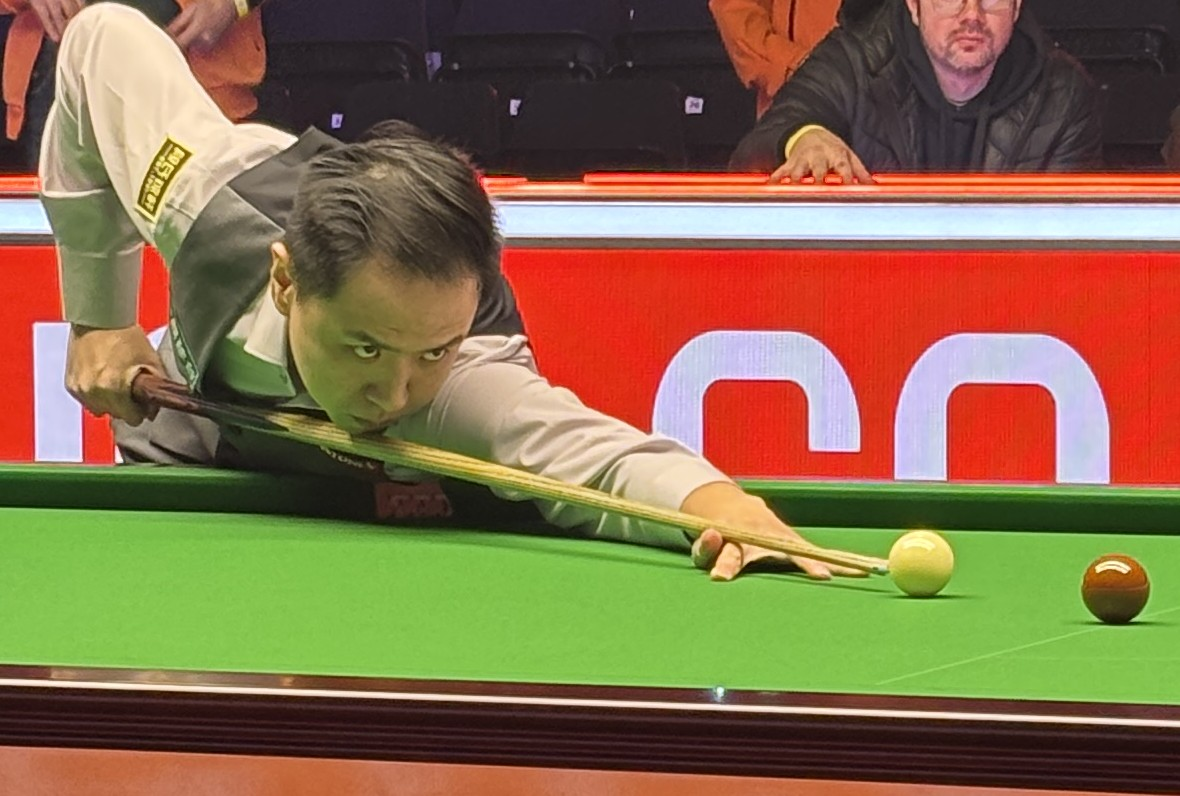
Xiao Guodong (pictured in 2026) was among a record nine players from mainland China in the last 16. He made a total clearance of 144 as he defeated three-time winner Ronnie O'Sullivan.

Nine players from mainland China reached the last 16 of the tournament, a record for any ranking event. Facing three-time World Grand Prix winner O'Sullivan, Xiao produced a total clearance of 144 to win the opening frame and then made a 78 break to take frame two. O'Sullivan produced breaks of 74 and 79 as he tied the scores at 3–3, but Xiao won the last two frames with breaks of 58 and 66 to secure a 5–3 victory. "Ronnie [O'Sullivan] is my idol," said Xiao afterwards. "I want him to do well and win tournaments. But this is sport and whenever I play, I want to win." Wakelin trailed Slessor 2–4 but then took three consecutive frames to win the match 5–4. Facing Pang, Si made breaks including 93, 121, and 122 as he won the first four frames. Pang responded with breaks of 78, 105, and 118 as he reduced Si's lead to 4–3, but Si took frame eight on the colours for a 5–3 victory. Facing Zhang, Hawkins recovered from 1–3 behind to tie the scores at 3–3, but Zhang then made breaks of 82 and 97 to advance, also by a 5–3 scoreline.

Selby made breaks of 90, 109, 73, and 56 as he took a 4–1 lead over Zhao, who then produced breaks of 81, 140, and 112 to tie the scores at 4–4. In the deciding frame, Zhao was on a break of 45 when he missed the black, but he secured the frame and match after Selby missed a red. Carter lost the first two frames against Yuan but then made breaks including 53, 138, 62, and 66 as he took five consecutive frames to win the match 5–2. Zhou produced breaks including 139, 78, 61, and 99 as he beat Jones 5–1. Facing Chang, Wu made a century of 130 to win the opening frame. Chang won frame two with an 88 break, but Wu produced two 64 breaks as he took a 3–1 lead. Chang made breaks of 57 and 134 to tie the scores at 3–3, but Wu took the last two frames with breaks of 69 and 72, winning 5–3.

=== Quarter-finals ===
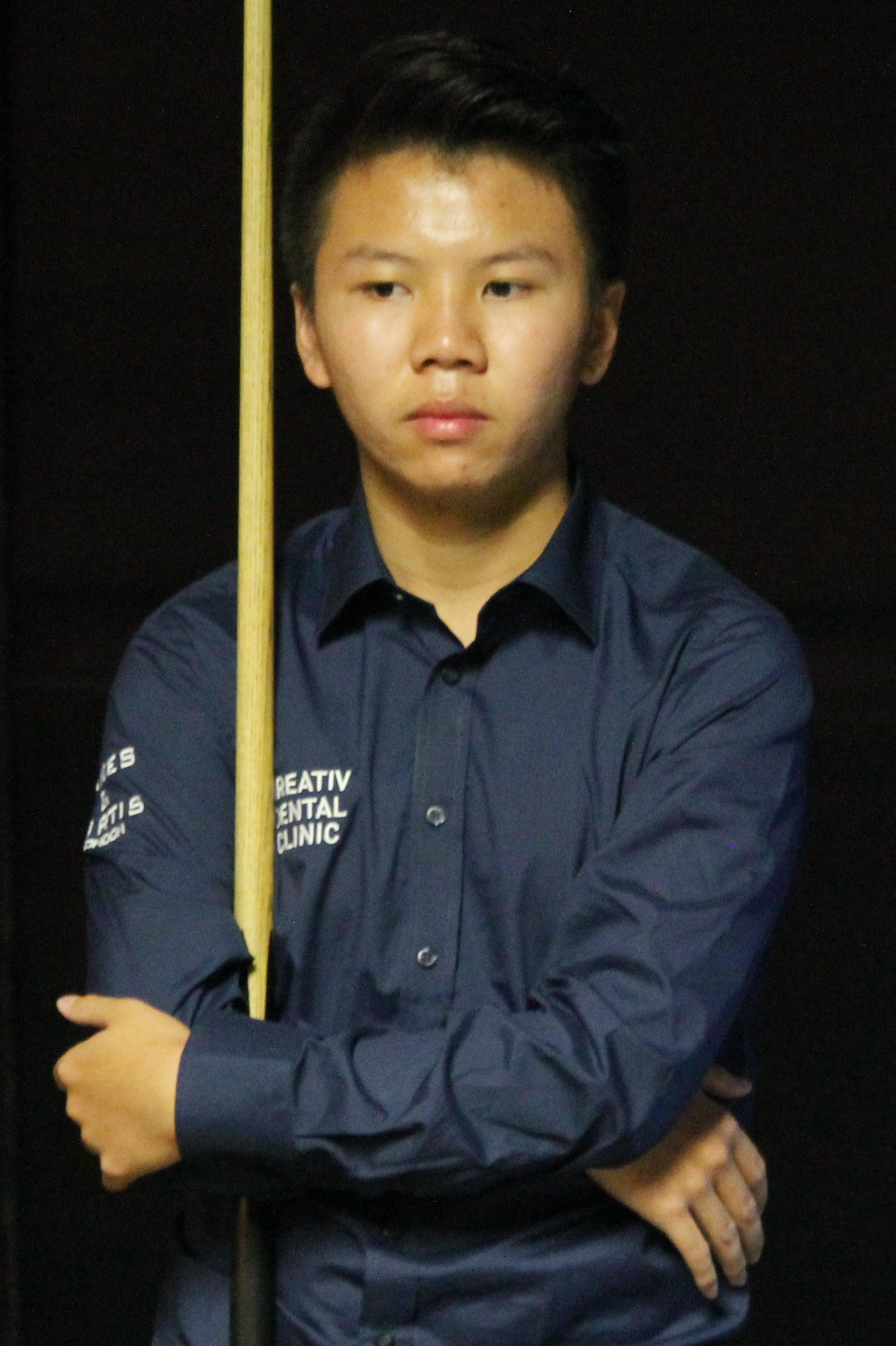
Zhou Yuelong (pictured in 2015) was among a record six players from mainland China in the quarter-finals. He defeated Ali Carter, helped by a fluke in the deciding frame.

Six players from mainland China reached the quarter-finals, setting a new record for a ranking event. The previous record had been five, set at the 2022 Championship League. Zhang made breaks of 97, 92, and 74 as he took a 3–1 lead over Wu at the mid-session interval. Wu won frame five with a century of 101, but Zhang produced breaks of 52 and 135 to win 5–2 and reach the fourth ranking semi-final of his career. "There were a few scrappy moments, but I didn't make many mistakes and generally played quite consistently," said Zhang afterwards. "I didn't give him too many chances, and honestly I didn't expect to win 5–2, because Wu has been in great form and full of confidence recently." Xiao made breaks of 72, 97, 122, 67, and 78 as he defeated Si, also by a 5–2 scoreline. "Today I felt a bit tired, with jet lag and poor sleep, but once you enter a tournament, you have to maintain the right mindset and commit fully," said Xiao, who reached his 12th ranking semi-final. "Since the start of January I have played more than 30 matches. I don't think I've ever played this many before."

Zhou led Carter 3–1 at the mid-session interval, but Carter then made three consecutive 88 breaks as he moved 4–3 ahead. Carter had an opportunity to win the match in frame eight but missed the green while on a break of 41, and Zhou won the frame with a 66 clearance. In the decider, Carter made a break of 20 before missing a red. Zhou fluked a red and then produced a break of 56, which helped him secure the frame and match. "I had a bit of luck on my side, but most importantly I managed to hold my nerve under pressure," Zhou said afterwards. Zhao took a 4–1 lead over Wakelin, who responded with breaks of 91, 76, and 118 to tie the scores at 4–4. Wakelin required five snookers in the deciding frame but secured 15 penalty points from fouls to require only one snooker. However, Zhao sealed victory by potting the last red. "Of course I'm thrilled to advance, though honestly neither of us played well from start to finish," Zhao said afterwards. "When I was leading 4–1 and he started closing the gap, I did wonder what would happen if I lost. But I kept telling myself to take it slowly, shot by shot, and finish decisively when possible."

=== Semi-finals ===
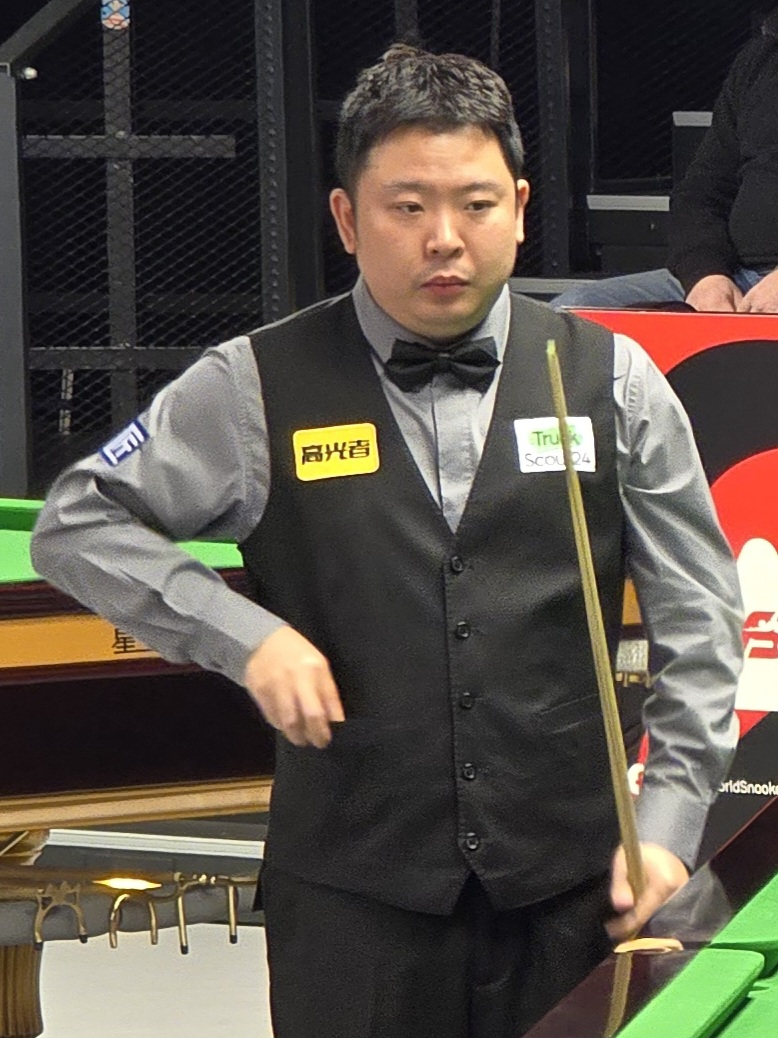
For the first time in a ranking tournament, all four semi-finalists were from mainland China. Zhang Anda (pictured in 2025) defeated Zhou Yuelong on the last black of a deciding frame.

For the first time, all four semi-finalists at a professional ranking snooker tournament were from mainland China. England and Scotland were the only previous countries to have produced all four semi-finalists at a ranking event. In the first semi-final, which lasted almost four and a half hours, Zhang faced Zhou. In a closely fought match, the players were never separated by more than one frame, as Zhang came from behind three times to tie the scores at 4–4. Zhang then made a century of 121 to lead 5–4, but Zhou made an 82 break to tie the scores again at 5–5. In the decider, Zhang missed the last red while playing the shot with the rest. Zhou cleared to the brown but failed to get position on the blue, which would have been match ball. During a safety exchange, Zhou went in-off the blue, and Zhang potted the last three balls, winning the match on the last black. Defeat for Zhou meant that he was still seeking his maiden ranking title, having lost five ranking semi-finals and four ranking finals. "I was nervous in the last frame and I'm still nervous here," Zhang said in his post-match interview, noting that his hands were still shaking. "I don't know why I'm playing so well this week. Maybe just because my family are here. They give me more confidence and I love Hong Kong. I can speak Cantonese here so it is like a second home."

In the second semi-final, Zhao played Xiao. Zhao led by 56 points in the opener, but Xiao produced a 65 clearance to win the frame on the last black. Zhao made breaks of 55 and 69 to win the next two frames, but Xiao tied the scores at 2–2 at the mid-session interval. Zhao then won three consecutive frames to lead 5–2. Xiao won frame eight, but Zhao made a century of 121 in frame nine to complete a 6–3 victory. "I played much better today than yesterday," said Zhao after the match. "I made some good adjustments in all aspects. I was able to stay within my own rhythm. As a result, my overall performance was quite good." Anticipating the final against Zhang, he commented: "I hope the fans will continue to support me. Especially yesterday, I could really feel the atmosphere and support from the audience and that was a huge help to me... I lost to [Zhang] not long ago, so tomorrow I will definitely give it my best." By reaching the final, both Zhang and Zhao ensured that they would finish the event within the top 16 on the one-year ranking list and thus qualify for the 2026 Players Championship.

=== Final ===
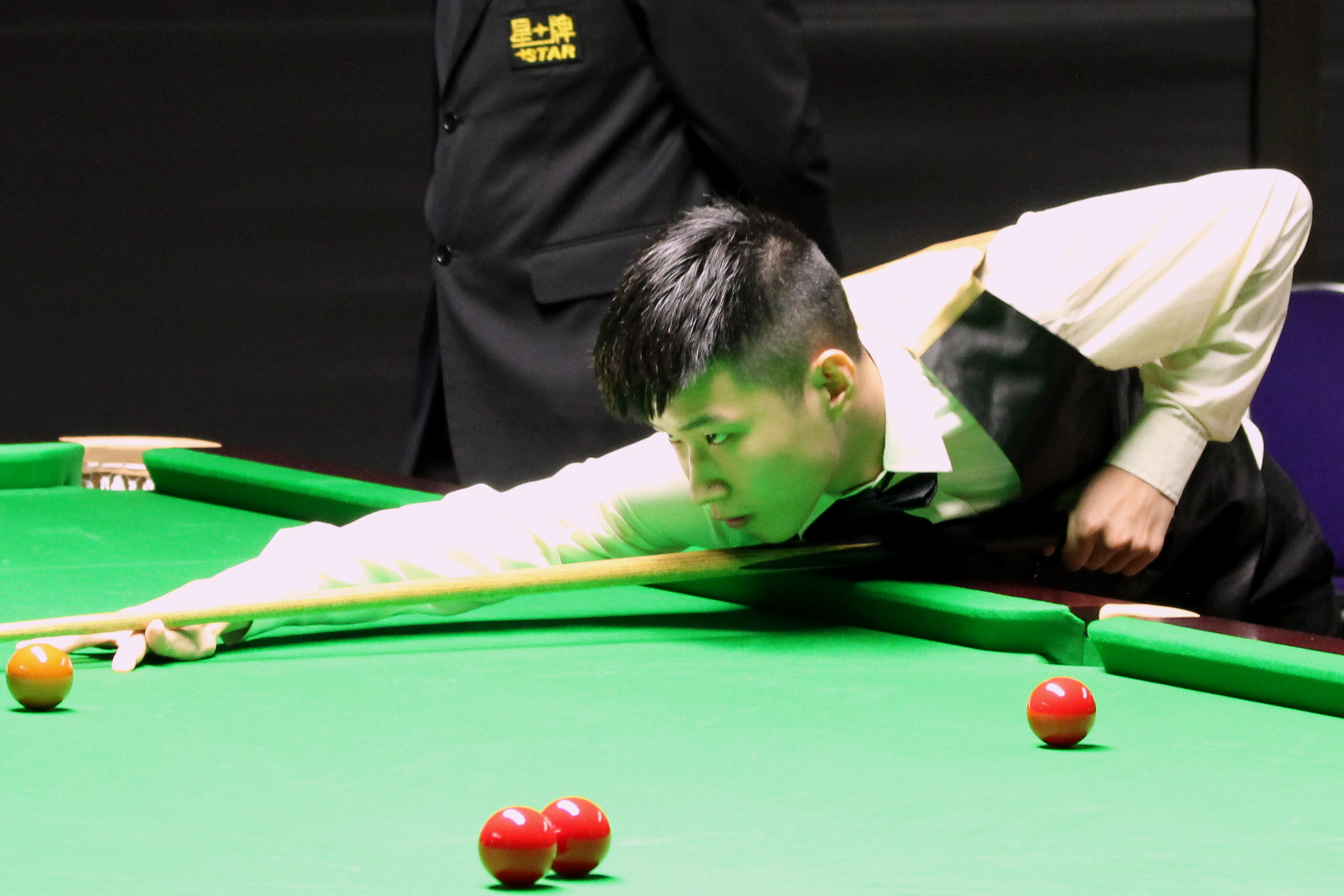
World Champion Zhao Xintong (pictured in 2016) defeated Zhang Anda 10–6 to win his fourth ranking title. He made five century breaks in the final, including the tournament's highest break of 145.

The final took place on 8 February as the best of 19 frames, played over two sessions, between Zhao and Zhang. Both players were competing in the fourth ranking final of their careers. It was their third meeting in professional competition, Zhang having won both previous encounters at the 2015 Australian Goldfields Open qualifiers and the 2025 UK Championship. After the players shared the first two frames, Zhao took frame three with a 75 break, but Zhang made breaks of 91 and 84 to move 3–2 ahead. Zhao produced back-to-back centuries of 130 and 145 to lead 4–3, but Zhang made an 84 break in frame eight to tie the scores at 4–4 after the first session. Zhao began the second session with breaks of 85 and 75 as he opened up a two-frame lead for the first time at 6–4. Zhang won frame 11 with a 53 break, but Zhao made a century of 111 to lead 7–5 at the mid-session interval. Zhang won frame 13, in which he attempted a maximum break but missed the 10th black, ending the break on 73. Zhao then won three consecutive frames with breaks of 134, 65, and 131 to complete a 10–6 victory. Zhao made five centuries in the final and nine in the tournament overall.

Victory gave Zhao his first World Grand Prix title and his fourth ranking title, following his wins at the 2021 UK Championship, the 2022 German Masters, and the 2025 World Snooker Championship. It meant that he had won all four of the ranking finals he had contested. He moved up one place to seventh in the world rankings. Defeat for Zhang meant that he had lost three of his four ranking finals, although he moved up three places to 20th in the world rankings. "We both played very well today, our scoring was at a high level throughout the match," said Zhao afterwards. "Perhaps later on I managed to take a few more chances. My mindset settled down nicely and my rhythm improved, which allowed me to play better and better. I was waiting for that one chance in every frame, then my aim was to push on and put pressure on him by getting well ahead. In the second half of the match, I was able to do that consistently, which made me very happy with my performance." However, Zhao added that he was still struggling with the pressure of competing as World Champion. "Mentally I still feel there is room to learn from the very top players," he said. "This season so far, although I've had some good results, I feel that my overall consistency hasn't been as strong as the very best."

== Tournament draw ==
The draw for the tournament is shown below. Numbers in parentheses after the players' names denote the players' seedings, and players in bold denote match winners. The last-32, last-16 and quarter-final matches were played over the best of 9 frames; the semi-finals were the best of 11 frames, and the final was the best of 19 frames, played over two sessions.

**Last 32**; Best of 9 frames
Neil Robertson (AUS) (1)	1
**Jak Jones (WAL) (32)**	**5**
**Zhou Yuelong (CHN) (16)**	**5**
Stephen Maguire (SCO) (17)	2
Mark Allen (NIR) (9)	4
**Ali Carter (ENG) (24)**	**5**
Judd Trump (ENG) (8)	2
**Yuan Sijun (CHN) (25)**	**5**
**Wu Yize (CHN) (5)**	**5**
Anthony McGill (SCO) (28)	3
Jack Lisowski (ENG) (12)	4
**Chang Bingyu (CHN) (21)**	**5**
**Barry Hawkins (ENG) (13)**	**5**
Ding Junhui (CHN) (20)	3
Mark Williams (WAL) (4)	2
**Zhang Anda (CHN) (29)**	**5**
Shaun Murphy (ENG) (3)	1
**Pang Junxu (CHN) (30)**	**5**
Gary Wilson (ENG) (14)	2
**Si Jiahui (CHN) (19)**	**5**
**Xiao Guodong (CHN) (11)**	**5**
Kyren Wilson (ENG) (22)	2
**Ronnie O'Sullivan (ENG) (6)**	**5**
Joe O'Connor (ENG) (27)	3
**Chris Wakelin (ENG) (7)**	**5**
Thepchaiya Un-Nooh (THA) (26)	0
**Elliot Slessor (ENG) (10)**	**5**
Stuart Bingham (ENG) (23)	2
John Higgins (SCO) (15)	3
**Zhao Xintong (CHN) (18)**	**5**
**Mark Selby (ENG) (2)**	**5**
Aaron Hill (IRL) (31)	0

**Last 16**; Best of 9 frames
(Wales) Jak Jones (32)	1
**(China) Zhou Yuelong (16)**	**5**
**(England) Ali Carter (24)**	**5**
(China) Yuan Sijun (25)	2
**(China) Wu Yize (5)**	**5**
(China) Chang Bingyu (21)	3
(England) Barry Hawkins (13)	3
**(China) Zhang Anda (29)**	**5**
(China) Pang Junxu (30)	3
**(China) Si Jiahui (19)**	**5**
**(China) Xiao Guodong (11)**	**5**
(England) Ronnie O'Sullivan (6)	3
**(England) Chris Wakelin (7)**	**5**
(England) Elliot Slessor (10)	4
**(China) Zhao Xintong (18)**	**5**
(England) Mark Selby (2)	4

**Quarter-finals**; Best of 9 frames
**(China) Zhou Yuelong (16)**	**5**
(England) Ali Carter (24)	4
(China) Wu Yize (5)	2
**(China) Zhang Anda (29)**	**5**
(China) Si Jiahui (19)	2
**(China) Xiao Guodong (11)**	**5**
(England) Chris Wakelin (7)	4
**(China) Zhao Xintong (18)**	**5**

**Semi-finals**; Best of 11 frames
(China) Zhou Yuelong (16)	5
**(China) Zhang Anda (29)**	**6**
(China) Xiao Guodong (11)	3
**(China) Zhao Xintong (18)**	**6**

**Final**; Best of 19 frames
(China) Zhang Anda (29)	6
**(China) Zhao Xintong (18)**	**10**

=== Final: frame scores ===
Final: Best of 19 frames. Referee: Zheng Weili; Kai Tak Arena, Kowloon City, Hong Kong, 8 February 2026
Zhang Anda (29); China	6–**10**	**Zhao Xintong** (18); China
Afternoon: 1–**77**, **119**–7, 0–**83**, **92**–37, **84**–4, 0–**130** (130), 0–**145** (145), **84**–0; Evening: 31–**85**, 0–**75**, **68**–29, 27–**111** (111), **83**–35, 5–**134** (134), 20–**66**, 0–**131** (131)
(frame 4) 91	Highest break	**145** (frame 7)
0	Century breaks	**5**

== Century breaks ==
A total of 37 century breaks were made during the tournament.

- 145, 140, 134, 131, 130, 121, 121, 112, 111 – Zhao Xintong
- 144, 122 – Xiao Guodong
- 141 – Barry Hawkins
- 139, 116 – Zhou Yuelong
- 138 – Ali Carter
- 135, 124, 121, 102 – Zhang Anda
- 134, 130, 118, 105 – Pang Junxu
- 134 – Chang Bingyu
- 130, 112, 101 – Wu Yize
- 122, 121, 102 – Si Jiahui
- 118 – Chris Wakelin
- 116 – Ding Junhui
- 109, 100 – Mark Selby
- 108, 103 – Yuan Sijun
- 100 – Gary Wilson
