= 2024 Tour Championship =

2024 Johnstone's Paint Tour Championship

Tournament information
- Dates: 1–7 April 2024
- Venue: Manchester Central
- City: Manchester
- Country: England
- Organisation: World Snooker Tour
- Format: Ranking event
- Total prize fund: £500,000
- Winner's share: £150,000
- Highest break: Mark Allen (NIR) (142)

Final
- Champion: Mark Williams (WAL)
- Runner-up: Ronnie O'Sullivan (ENG)
- Score: 10–5

The 2024 Tour Championship (officially the 2024 Johnstone's Paint Tour Championship) was a professional snooker tournament that took place from 1 to 7 April 2024 at the Manchester Central in Manchester, England. The 16th and penultimate ranking event of the 2023‍–‍24 season, it preceded the World Championship. It was the last of three events in the Players Series, following the World Grand Prix and the Players Championship. Organised by the World Snooker Tour and sponsored by Johnstone's Paint, the event was broadcast by ITV Sport domestically and by other broadcasters worldwide. The winner received £150,000 from a total prize fund of £500,000.

The event featured the top 12 players on the one‑year ranking list as it stood after the World Open. This represented an increase over previous editions of the tournament, which had featured eight competitors. Shaun Murphy had won the 2023 event where he defeated Kyren Wilson 10‍–‍7 in the final, but he failed to qualify for the 2024 edition.

Mark Williams defeated the world number two Judd Trump and world number three Mark Allen in the quarter‑final and semi‑final, and then world number one, Ronnie O'Sullivan, 10‍–‍5 in the final to win his first Tour Championship title, the 26th ranking title of his career, and the second of the season since he won the 2023 British Open. Aged 49, Williams became the second oldest ranking event winner after Ray Reardon. Along with O'Sullivan (48) it was the highest combined age for any two finalists of a ranking event.

The tournament produced 27 century breaks. Williams, O'Sullivan, and Allen each compiled six century breaks, with Allen making the tournament highest break of 142 in the quarter‑finals.

== Format ==
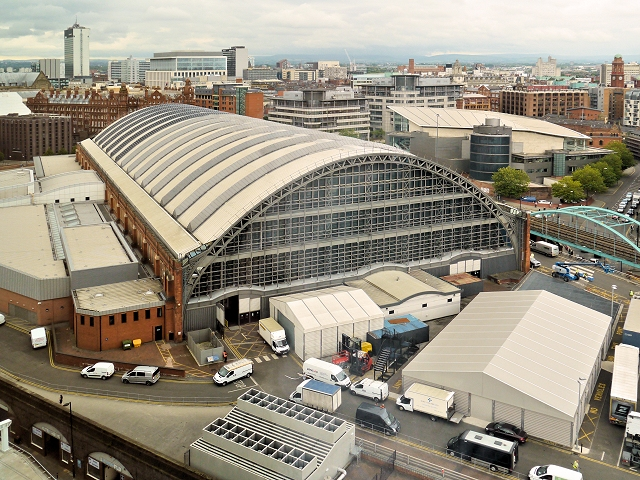
The event was staged at the Manchester Central in Manchester, England.

The 2024 Tour Championship took place from 1 to 7 April 2024 at the Manchester Central in Manchester, England. The 2024 edition of the Tour Championship had a modified format from previous editions. The top twelve players on the one‑year ranking list as it stood after the World Open participated in the event, whereas previous editions had featured eight competitors. The four highest‑ranked seeded players were given byes through to the quarter‑finals, while the remaining eight competed in the first round for the other four quarter‑final places.

All matches were played as the best of 19 frames, over two sessions. Instead of both sessions of each match being played in a single day in previous editions, two of the four first round matches and two of the four quarter‑finals were played over two days. English player Shaun Murphy won the previous year's event, defeating compatriot Kyren Wilson 10‍–‍7 in the final. However, Murphy was ranked 22nd on the one‑year list after the World Open, and did not qualify for the tournament. Reigning World Snooker Championship winner Luca Brecel also didn't qualify.

=== Broadcasters ===
The event was broadcast in the United Kingdom by ITV4 and ITV3; Liaoning TV, Migu, and Huya in mainland China; DAZN in the United States, Brazil, Germany, Austria, Belgium, Luxembourg, Switzerland, and Spain; Nova Sport in Czech Republic and Slovakia; Viaplay and Go3 Sport in Poland, Denmark, Estonia, Finland, Latvia, Lithuania, Sweden, Iceland, Netherlands, and Norway; Now TV in Hong Kong; Astro SuperSport in Malaysia and Brunei; True Sports in Thailand; Sportcast in Taiwan; Premier Sports Network in the Philippines; Fastsports in Pakistan; and Matchroom.live in all other territories.

=== Prize fund ===
The breakdown of prize money for the event is shown below:

- Winner: £150,000
- Runner-up: £60,000
- Semi-final: £40,000
- Quarter-final: £30,000
- First round: £20,000
- Highest break: £10,000
- Total: £500,000

=== Seeding list ===
Unlike other events where the defending champion is seeded first, the reigning World Champion second, and the rest based on the world rankings, the qualification and seedings in the Players Series tournaments are determined by the one‑year ranking list. The below list shows the top 12 players with the most ranking points acquired during the 2023‍–‍24 season, as of after the World Open who qualified for the event.

Seed	Player	Points
1	Judd Trump (ENG)	711,000
2	Ronnie O'Sullivan (ENG)	435,500
3	Zhang Anda (CHN)	334,000
4	Ding Junhui (CHN)	256,000
5	Mark Allen (NIR)	244,500
6	Gary Wilson (ENG)	211,500
7	Barry Hawkins (ENG)	203,500
8	Mark Williams (WAL)	203,000
9	Tom Ford (ENG)	177,000
10	Ali Carter (ENG)	174,500
11	Mark Selby (ENG)	173,000
12	John Higgins (SCO)	142,500

== Summary ==
=== First round ===
The first-round matches were played on 1 and 2 April. World number three and the 2020 runner-up Mark Allen and John Higgins, runner-up in 2022, contested the opening match of the first round. Previously in the 2023‍–‍24 season, Allen had defeated Higgins 6‍–‍2 in the semi-final of the 2023 Champion of Champions and 6‍–‍5 in the first round of the 2024 Masters. But Higgins claimed victory twice in February, winning 5‍–‍2 both times at the 2024 German Masters and the 2024 Welsh Open. Allen took the first frame with a 69 break, but Higgins won four frames in a row, making breaks of 85, 75, 55, and 66 to lead 4‍–‍1. Allen responded with a century break of 123, and won two more frames to even the match at 4‍–‍4 at the end of the session. The first four frames in the second session were shared, with Allen winning the 11th frame on the last black ball, and the scores were level at 6‍–‍6 at the mid-session interval. Allen pulled ahead with a 102 break in frame 13, and went on to take the 14th frame after a safety battle on the last pink ball. Higgins made a break of 86 to trail 7‍–‍8, but Allen won the 16th frame with a 93 break to recover a two frame advantage. Higgins only made a break of 20 early in frame 17, and made an error on a safety shot, allowing Allen to produce a 100 break to claim a 10‍–‍7 victory. Allen commented: "I'm very proud to have matched him [Higgins] in the safety department and scored better as the match went on." He attributed the win to working with psychologist Paul Gaffney, saying: "It has focussed my mind on just playing the next shot and the next frame as well as I can. My decision-making is more measured. Sometimes it's better to be patient and wait for a better chance." Higgins praised Allen's performance, while criticising his own: "I missed two or three unforgivable balls tonight. My long game was non-existent, and at this level it's not good enough against the best players." He hinted towards retiring, adding: "I just need to dust myself down a couple of weeks before the [World Championship], try to get some good practice in and go there and give it a final go maybe."

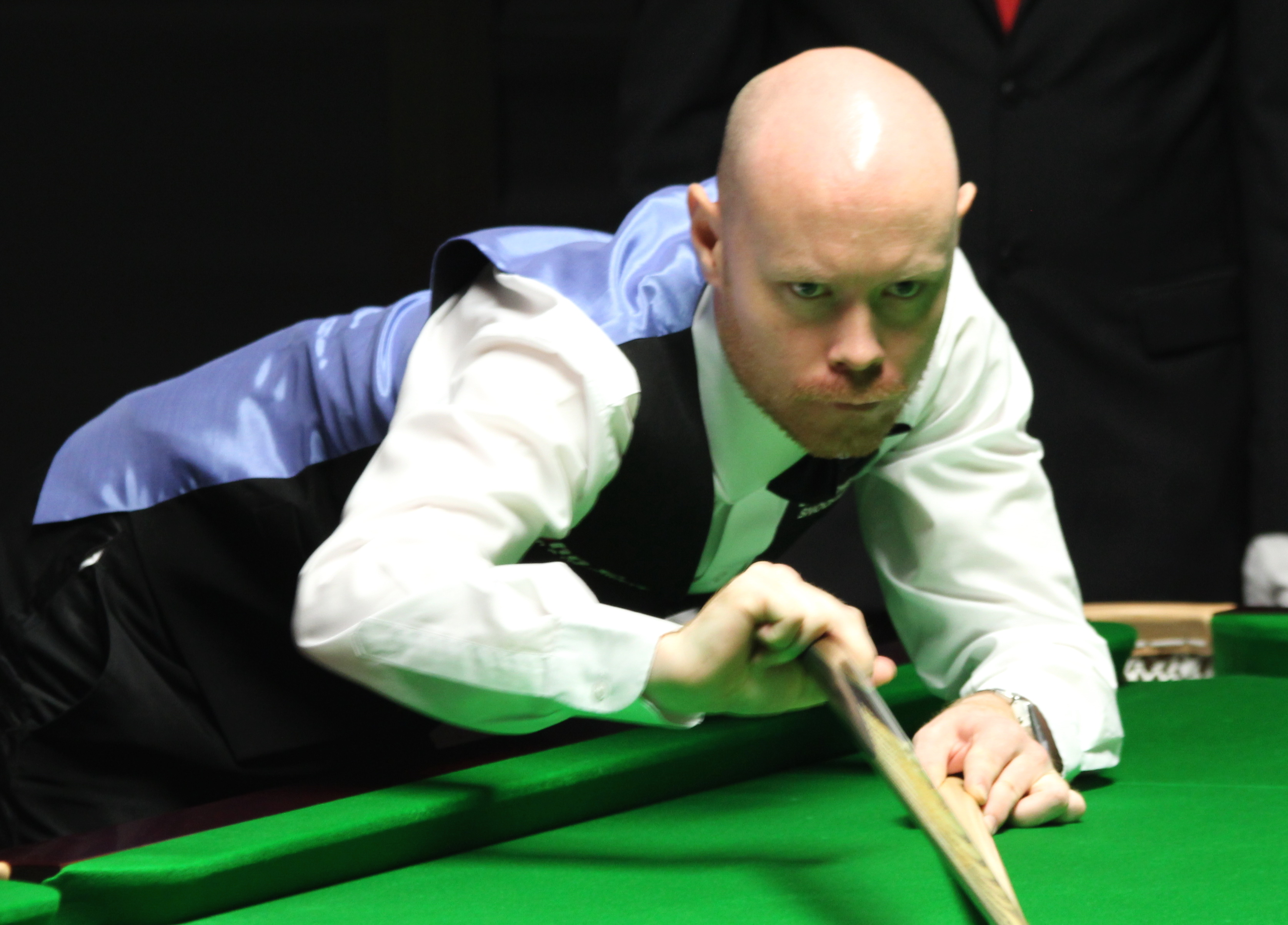
Tour Championship debutant Gary Wilson (pictured) defeated Mark Selby 10‍–‍8.

Tour Championship debutant Gary Wilson faced Mark Selby. They were tied at 2‍–‍2 before the mid-session interval, with Selby making a break of 85 in frame three, and Wilson breaks of 95 and 98 in the second and fourth frames. Wilson pulled ahead to 5‍–‍2 with breaks of 78 and 101, and Selby made a 71 break to trail by two frames at the end of the first session. Play resumed the next day, and Wilson maintained the two-frame advantage at 8‍–‍6 after both players shared the first six frames. Wilson had a chance to win frame 15, but missed the brown ball on two occasions, allowing Selby to secure the frame on the last black and reduce his deficit to one frame. Wilson won the closely contested 16th frame, also on the last black. Selby responded with a 90 break to trail 8‍–‍9, but he missed a red on a break of 30 in the 18th frame, and Wilson capitalised on the error with a clearance of 105 to win the match 10‍–‍8. Wilson commented: "It wasn't a great game, we both missed easy chances. I kept making it difficult for myself and handing him [Selby] chances to get back into the game. But thankfully I made a good break in the last frame to get over the line." The former world number one Selby called his performance "pathetic from start to finish" and "probably one of the worst games I've played as a professional. If I carry on playing like that I won't be enjoying it and [I'll be] choosing a different career, for sure." He also hinted towards possible retirement, adding: "I'll give the World Championships a go but if I carry on like that I won't carry on, 100%. When it gets to the point I'm not enjoying it, it doesn't matter where I am in the rankings, I'll be hanging my cue up. I can't enjoy performances like that."

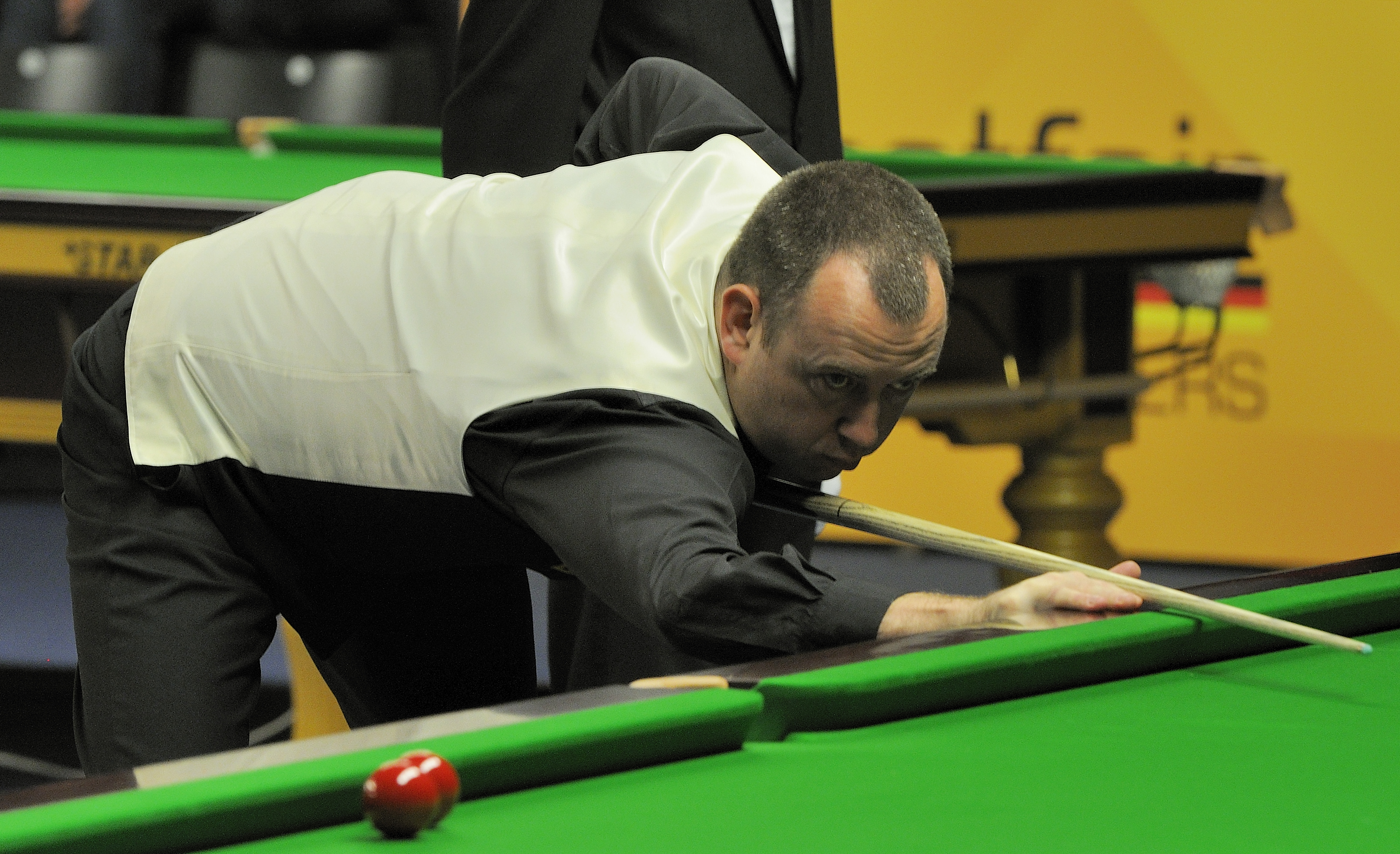
Mark Williams (pictured) beat tournament debutant Tom Ford 10‍–‍9, winning two frames on re-spotted blacks.

Mark Williams played another Tour Championship debutant, Tom Ford. Williams took on a 3‍–‍0 lead before Ford made a 114 break to trail 1‍–‍3 at the mid-session interval. Williams extended his lead with a 76 break, but Ford closed in to 3‍–‍4 with breaks of 73 and 136. The last frame of the session went to Williams, who made a 86 break to lead 5‍–‍3. When play resumed the next day, Williams won three of the four frames before the interval to lead 8‍–‍4, making breaks of 112 and 88 in frames nine and 12, and won the 11th frame on a re-spotted black. Ford responded by taking the next three frames, including two century breaks of 138 and 133 in frames 13 and 15. He also had chances in the next frame, but Williams won it on a re-spotted black, the second of the match, to lead 9‍–‍7. However, breaks of 90 and 63 from Ford levelled the match at 9‍–‍9, forcing a deciding frame. Ford had the first chance in the decider, but missed a pot on a red at 54‍–‍0 ahead, and Williams secured the frame with a break of 66 to win 10‍–‍9 on the last pink. Williams called the match-winning break in the deciding frame "one of the best clearances I've ever made." He added: "Tom [Ford] was by far the better player, he made four centuries and didn't win, he must have thought he had me. But I'm used to be being up against it. It shows where my game is at if I can play poorly but still win."

Barry Hawkins opened the match against Ali Carter by taking the first frame with a 84 break. Carter responded with breaks of 80, 51, and 83 to lead 3‍–‍1 at the mid-session interval, with Hawkins scoring only two points in those three frames. Carter moved ahead to 6‍–‍1, helped by a total clearance of 135 in the fifth frame and a 94 break in the sixth. He missed a pot on a pink in the eighth frame, but Hawkins was unable to take the opportunity, and Carter narrowly won the frame to end the session with a 7‍–‍1 lead. In the second session, Hawkins won three of the four frames before the mid-session interval to trail 4‍–‍8, and narrowed the gap further with a 118 break in the 13th frame. He scored 60 points in frame 14 before missing a pot on the black, leaving it in the jaws of the pocket, and Carter took the frame to get within one frame of victory at 9‍–‍5. However, Hawkins won three frames in a row, including the 17th frame on a re-spotted black after needing foul points from two snookers, to trail 8‍–‍9. A fluked red in the 18th frame helped Carter secure the frame and match 10‍–‍8. He commented: "At 7‍–‍1 sometimes you feel you have it all to lose. Barry [Hawkins] came back at me really well and it got a bit sticky in the end. But that makes it a better win. If I had won 10‍–‍1 it would have felt like a bit of a non-event."

=== Quarter-finals ===
The quarter-finals were played on 3 and 4 April. World number one Ronnie O'Sullivan, the 2019 champion and runner-up in 2021, played Carter in the first quarter-final. Their three meetings previously in the season all ended in victory for O'Sullivan, including 6‍–‍3 at the 2023 Shanghai Masters, 6‍–‍4 at the 2023 International Championship, and 10‍–‍7 in the final of the 2024 Masters, where O'Sullivan claimed his record-extending eighth Masters title. O'Sullivan made breaks of 77, 87, and 54 as he led 4‍–‍0 at the mid-session interval. He moved ahead to 7‍–‍0 with breaks of 51, 81, and 92. Carter made a total clearance of 141 in the eighth frame to win his first frame of the match, trailing 1‍–‍7 at the end of the first session. Carter won another frame with a 70 break after play resumed, narrowing his deficit to 2‍–‍7. However, breaks of 62, 54, and 67 saw O'Sullivan secure the match 10‍–‍2. O'Sullivan, who had withdrawn from the Welsh Open in February citing mental health reasons, commented on the difficulties he had faced that prompted him to work with Steve Peters, his psychiatrist, saying: "It's been a hard year, drove myself pretty much insane really. It's just got to me. I had to go back to basics and get my head right. [I had to] deal with it because doing it the other way round isn't working. Just getting my head around it is the only option I have left. I've driven myself mad for the last two years and not enjoyed any of it."

The second quarter-final was played between championship debutants Zhang Anda and Wilson. Despite making a 85 break in the third frame, Zhang was trailing 1‍–‍3 at the mid-session interval. But he won three frames in a row, making breaks of 93 and 74, to lead 4‍–‍3. The last frame of the first session went to Wilson, levelling the match at 4‍–‍4. Zhang took the opening frame of the second session on the following day, but Wilson won three consecutive frames to lead 7‍–‍5. Zhang took the next two frames, and was trailing 9‍–‍61 in the 15th frame, but capitalised on Wilson's missed red to lead 8‍–‍7, doubling the last red as he won the 15th frame with a clearance of 55. Wilson responded with breaks of 94 and 85 to recover his lead at 9‍–‍8. Zhang had the first chance in the 18th frame, but only scored 34 before missing a red, and Wilson made a break of 50 before running out of position. Wilson secured the frame after a safety battle, winning the match 10‍–‍8. Despite the win, Wilson, who won both the Scottish Open and Welsh Open earlier in the season, was unsatisfied with his performance, saying: "I showed grit and determination and tried my best, those are the only positives I can take. Even in the tournaments I won this season, there were spells where my game was in the bin." He added: "This is a game of very small margins. But I know I have to improve because those kind of performances are not good enough."

Ding Junhui faced Allen in the third quarter-final. Ding had defeated Allen 10‍–‍5 in the quarter-final of the previous year's championship, as well as winning 6‍–‍5 at the first round of the 2023 UK Championship earlier in the season. Allen made a break of 100 in the opening frame, but Ding took the next three to lead 3‍–‍1 at the mid-session interval. The players shared the next four frames to end the session with a 5‍–‍3 lead for Ding. Play resumed the next day, and Ding took the ninth frame with a 70 break to extend his lead to 6‍–‍3. However, Allen won four frames in a row for a 7‍–‍6 advantage, making a total clearance of 142 in the tenth frame. Ding recovered his lead with breaks of 82 and 67 in frames 14 and 15, and acquired the snookers he needed in frame 16, but missed the final pink. Allen potted both pink and black to force a re-spotted black, which he potted after Ding's safety error to win the frame, drawing level at 8‍–‍8. Allen went on to win frames 17 and 18 with breaks of 56 and 127 to claim a 10‍–‍8 victory. Allen commented: "The 16th frame was huge because at 8‍–‍8 I felt relaxed and my game was in the right shape. Getting a bit of gym work in before [the World Championship in] Sheffield will help me get ready. The longer the matches go on, the more I come into my own. I came here to work on a few things technically, and tonight even at 8‍–‍8 I stuck with what I have been working on. Now I am in the semis I want to go on and win it."

The fourth quarter-final was contested between world number two and the top seed Judd Trump and Williams. The opening frame went to Williams as Trump went in-off on the last pink, and Williams made a 85 break to lead 2‍–‍0. The third frame also came down to the last pink, with Williams trailing by 15 points, but he won the frame after Trump conceded foul points by failing to make contact with the pink. Trump won frame four to trail 1‍–‍3 at the mid-session interval, and Williams recovered his three-frame lead by taking the fifth frame on the colours. Trump claimed the next two frames, making a break of 81 in the sixth frame. The eighth frame went to Williams, who made a 71 break to lead 5‍–‍3 at the end of the session. Williams moved ahead to 7‍–‍3 after play resumed, winning both frames 9 and 10 on the colours. Trump capitalised on Williams' miss on a red in the 11th frame to narrow the gap to 7‍–‍4, but Williams won three frames in a row to secure the match 10‍–‍4. Trump's loss meant that he was unable to supplant O'Sullivan's world number one spot, and O'Sullivan would enter the World Championship as the second seed, with the reigning World Champion Luca Brecel seeded first. Williams, who was defeated by Trump 17‍–‍16 in the semi-final of the 2022 World Championship and 10‍–‍8 at the 2023 Masters final, said: "It's about time I beat Judd [Trump] because I have lost a few close matches against him. To beat the player of the season so far 10‍–‍4, I can't ask for any more than that, even though he didn't play well. My game is as good as it could be given where I am in my career. This is a nice stepping stone ahead of [the World Championship at] the Crucible."

=== Semi-finals ===
O'Sullivan played Wilson in the first semi-final on 5 April. O'Sullivan was contesting his 92nd career ranking semi-final, and Wilson his tenth. O'Sullivan had previously defeated Wilson 5‍–‍1 in the quarter-final of the World Grand Prix earlier in the season. Wilson won the first two frames, but O'Sullivan made a break of 102 in the third frame and won the fourth to draw level at the mid-session interval. He went on to take a 3‍–‍2 lead with a break of 110 in frame five. In the sixth frame, Wilson was trailing 40‍–‍57 when he potted a red which was touching the pink. The referee Paul Collier called foul on Wilson, believing that the cue ball had contacted the pink first. Wilson accepted the decision after a brief discussion, but slow motion replay later showed that the cue ball had actually hit the red first, and was not a foul shot. The frame went to O'Sullivan, who then led 4‍–‍2. Wilson produced breaks of 83 and 84 to end the session with the scores level at 4‍–‍4. Wilson took the opening frame of the second session, but O'Sullivan capitalised on Wilson's multiple errors to win three frames in a row and lead 7‍–‍5. Breaks of 82 and 96 from Wilson evened the scores again to 7‍–‍7. However, O'Sullivan made breaks of 97 and 129 to win three consecutive frames in only 33 minutes, and capture a 10‍–‍7 victory to reach his 64th career ranking final. O'Sullivan praised his opponent after the match, saying: "I really rate Gary [Wilson]. We have become good friends. He's an honest bloke, the way he is in interviews, he's the same in real life. He's a great lad and it's great to see him winning tournaments. He loves the game so much and gets frustrated by it sometimes, a bit like me. But he's learning now that you can't always play well, you need the patience to give yourself a chance." He also revealed that he's been suffering from "the yips" and has tried to change his mindset: "That's not a nice place to be, so I've got nothing left to do other than to try to get myself mentally out of it and hopefully my game will start to flow again, maybe."

Williams and Allen contested the second semi-final on 6 April. In February, Allen had defeated Williams 6‍–‍3 in the first round of the Players Championship. Williams made breaks of 57, 99, and 105 as he won all four frames before the mid-session interval to lead 4‍–‍0. He attempted a maximum break in frame five, but missed the last red to end the break at 112. Allen had a chance to win the sixth frame despite trailing 0‍–‍66, but missed potting the final blue and lost the frame. Williams went on to take the next two frames to capture all eight frames of the first session. When play resumed, Williams compiled a break of 140 to get one frame within victory at 9‍–‍0. However, Allen won the tenth frame with a 65 break to avoid a whitewash defeat, and took the 11th frame with a break of 53 to trail 2‍–‍9. As Williams began to make errors, Allen capitalised on the opportunities to win three more frames, making breaks of 79, 56, and 69, to narrow his deficit to 5‍–‍9. Williams got the first chance in the 15th frame by potting a long red, and went on to take the frame with a 75 break to secure the match 10‍–‍5 and reach the 41st ranking final of his career. Williams said: "I was a bit worried at 9‍–‍5. I had a couple of chances to win 9‍–‍1 or 9‍–‍2. Mark [Allen] played really well after that. If it had gone 9‍–‍6 then I was really under it. But the break I made in the last frame was as good as any I made in the match, it's nice to know I've still got that bottle." Commenting on the final against O'Sullivan, Williams added: "I know I haven't played Ronnie [O'Sullivan] in a final for a long time but that's because he keeps beating me before the final! I'm just going to enjoy it. How many more times is this going to happen? I couldn't pick a better player to play in a final. I'm going to attack and try my best."

=== Final ===
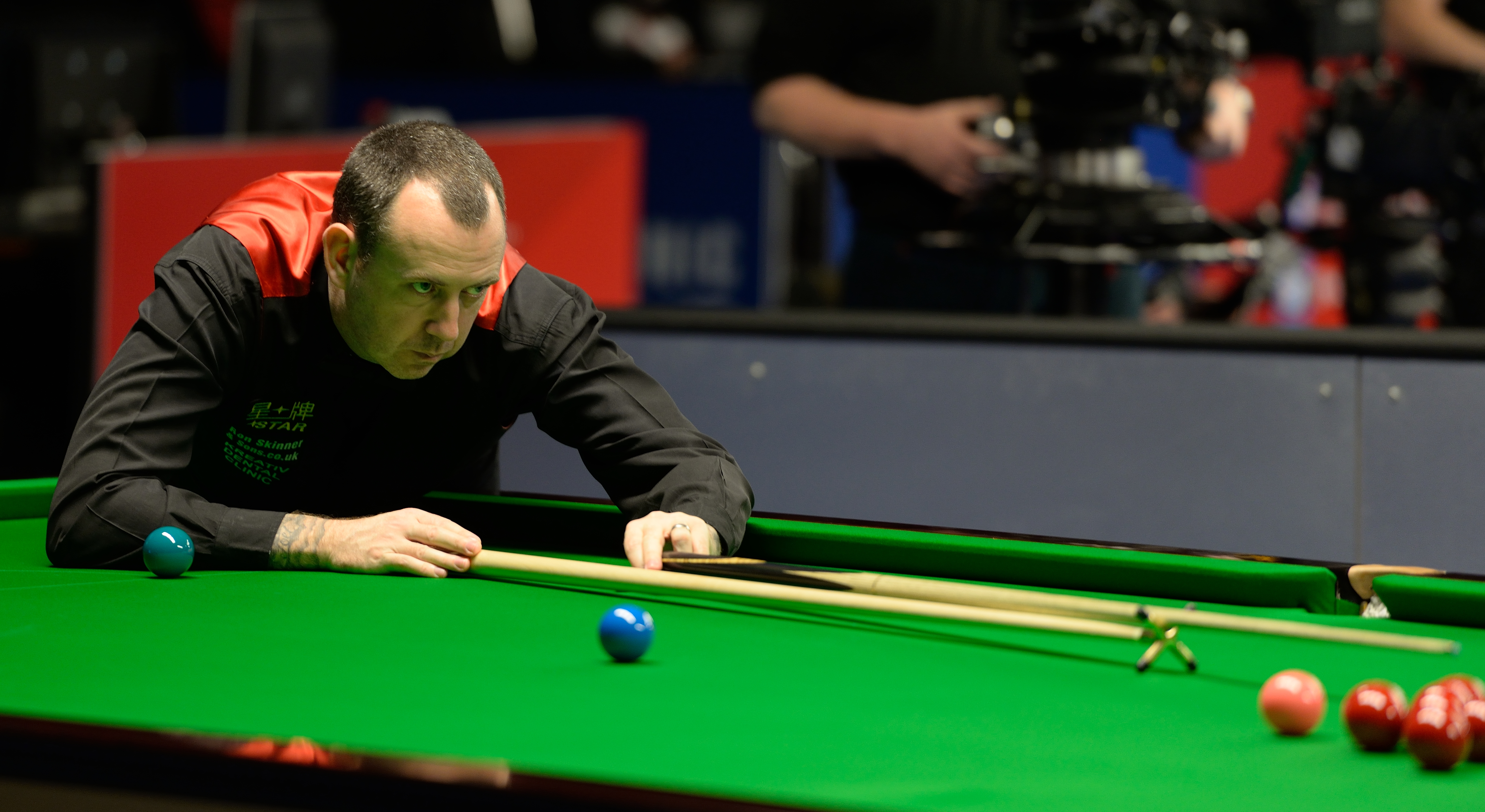
Mark Williams (pictured) beat the three highest-ranked players, including world number one Ronnie O'Sullivan 10‍–‍5 in the final, to win his 26th career ranking title.

The final was played on 7 April between O'Sullivan and Williams, both part of the "Class of '92". The two had met numerous times over their careers, with O'Sullivan prevailing in most of the encounters. However, the two had not met in a ranking event final since the 2000 China Open, where O'Sullivan claimed a 9‍–‍3 victory. The match was officiated by Olivier Marteel with assistance by Lyu Xilin. Aged a combined 97 years old, it was the highest combined age of any ranking event final.

Williams took on a 2‍–‍1 lead, making breaks of 66 and 91 in the first and third frames. Despite missing four consecutive pots, Williams won frame four with two breaks of 66 and 67 to lead 3‍–‍1 at the mid-session interval. O'Sullivan responded with back-to-back century breaks of 102 and 127 to draw level at 3‍–‍3, and won frame seven with a break of 59. Williams potted an opening long red to create the first chance in the eighth frame, but missed the next black, and O'Sullivan took the frame with a 121 break to lead 5‍–‍3 at the end of the first session, winning all four frames after the interval in only 37 minutes. After play resumed, Williams won the opening frame as he potted the last red with a swerve shot and cleared the colours. A 104 break from Williams in the tenth frame evened the scores at 5‍–‍5. O'Sullivan was unable to capitalise on Williams' missed pot to win the next frame, and Williams made a break of 54 to lead 6‍–‍5. The next three frames all went to Williams, who compiled 99, 112, and 78 breaks to move 9‍–‍5 ahead. Both players missed several pots in frame 15, but Williams doubled the last red to leave O'Sullivan needing snookers, who conceded the frame after Williams potted the yellow. As he captured all seven frames in the second session, Williams secured a 10‍–‍5 victory to win his first Tour Championship title, his 26th career ranking title, and the second of the season since he won the 2023 British Open in October.

Williams commented: "I never thought I'd be winning tournaments at 49. The World Championships are around the corner. He's [O'Sullivan's] the man to beat, but you never know." He added: "I'm a better all-round player than I've ever been, considering I don't practise that much. I'm over the moon. I beat Judd Trump, Mark Allen and Ronnie O'Sullivan. The three best players in the world. I haven't done it the easy way. I've won quite well." O'Sullivan described Williams as "probably the most talented snooker player I've ever seen", saying: "He's been the most consistent player for the last five years. He seems so strong. I tried, I gave it everything to stay in the match, but he's so consistent and so strong. You might get the better of him in one session, but if you don't keep playing top-level snooker, he'll eat you alive. I thought I did well to get five frames."

The final was watched by a peak audience of 874,000 from a total of 3.35 million viewers throughout the tournament.

== Tournament draw ==
Numbers in parentheses after the players' names denote the players' seedings, and players in bold denote match winners. All matches were played as the best of 19 frames over two sessions.

Seeds 1 to 4 received a bye in the first round.

**First round** Best of 19 frames
**Mark Williams (WAL) (8)**	**10**
Tom Ford (ENG) (9)	9
**Mark Allen (NIR) (5)**	**10**
John Higgins (SCO) (12)	7
**Gary Wilson (ENG) (6)**	**10**
Mark Selby (ENG) (11)	8
Barry Hawkins (ENG) (7)	8
**Ali Carter (ENG) (10)**	**10**

**Quarter-finals**; Best of 19 frames
Judd Trump (ENG) (1)	4
**Mark Williams (WAL) (8)**	**10**
Ding Junhui (CHN) (4)	8
**Mark Allen (NIR) (5)**	**10**
Zhang Anda (CHN) (3)	8
**Gary Wilson (ENG) (6)**	**10**
**Ronnie O'Sullivan (ENG) (2)**	**10**
Ali Carter (ENG) (10)	2

**Semi-finals**; Best of 19 frames
**Mark Williams (WAL) (8)**	**10**
Mark Allen (NIR) (5)	5
Gary Wilson (ENG) (6)	7
**Ronnie O'Sullivan (ENG) (2)**	**10**

**Final**; Best of 19 frames
**Mark Williams (WAL) (8)**	**10**
Ronnie O'Sullivan (ENG) (2)	5

Match details from World Snooker Tour: first round, quarter-finals, semi-finals, and final. (Note: For the final match between Mark Williams and Ronnie O'Sullivan, the source (WST) frame score data is incorrect. For the last (15th) frame WST has 47‍–‍19. It was actually 50‍–‍19.)

=== Final ===
Final
Final: Best of 19 frames. Referee: Olivier Marteel; Manchester Central, Manchester, England, 7 April 2024
**Mark Williams** (8); Wales	**10**–5	Ronnie O'Sullivan (2); England
Afternoon: **73**–29, 10–**107**, **91**–6, **137**–0, 0–**102** (102), 0–**127** (127), 1–**78**, 1–**121** (121); Evening: **62**–33, **117**–0 (104), **66**–42, **105**–8, **112**–27 (112), **78**–0, **50**–19
(frame 13) 112	Highest break	**127** (frame 6)
2	Century breaks	**3**

== Century breaks ==
A total of 27 century breaks were made in the tournament.

- 142, 127, 123, 102, 100, 100 – Mark Allen
- 141, 135 – Ali Carter
- 140, 112, 112, 112, 105, 104 – Mark Williams
- 138, 136, 133, 114 – Tom Ford
- 129, 127, 121, 110, 102, 102 – Ronnie O'Sullivan
- 118 – Barry Hawkins
- 105, 101 – Gary Wilson
