= 2024 World Grand Prix (snooker) =

Snooker tournament

2024 Spreadex World Grand Prix

Tournament information
- Dates: 15–21 January 2024
- Venue: Leicester Arena
- City: Leicester
- Country: England
- Organisation: World Snooker Tour
- Format: Ranking event
- Total prize fund: £380,000
- Winner's share: £100,000
- Highest break: Shaun Murphy (ENG) (145)

Final
- Champion: Ronnie O'Sullivan (ENG)
- Runner-up: Judd Trump (ENG)
- Score: 10–7

The 2024 World Grand Prix (officially the 2024 Spreadex World Grand Prix) was a professional snooker tournament that took place from 15 to 21 January 2024 at the Leicester Arena, England. The eleventh ranking event of the 2023‍–‍24 season, following the Scottish Open and preceding the German Masters, it was the first of three events in the Players Series, preceding the Players Championship and the Tour Championship. Organised by the World Snooker Tour and sponsored by betting company Spreadex, the event was broadcast by ITV domestically, by Eurosport in Europe, and by other broadcasters worldwide. The winner received £100,000 from a total prize fund of £380,000.

The event featured the top 32 players in the one‑year ranking list as it stood after the 2023 Scottish Open. Mark Allen was the defending champion, having defeated Judd Trump 10‍–‍9 in the previous final, but he lost 2‍–‍4 to Zhang Anda in the last 16. Ronnie O'Sullivan defeated Trump 10‍–‍7 in the final to capture his third World Grand Prix title, and a record-extending 41st ranking title.

== Format ==
The event took place from 15 to 21 January 2024 at the Leicester Arena, United Kingdom. It featured the top 32 players in the one‑year ranking list as it stood after the 2023 Scottish Open.

The last-32 and last-16 matches were played as the best of seven frames; the quarter-finals were the best of nine frames; the semi-finals were the best of 11 frames, and the final was the best of 19 frames, played over two sessions. The defending champion was Northern Irish player Mark Allen, who won his first World Grand Prix title in 2023, defeating England's Judd Trump 10‍–‍9 in the final.

=== Broadcasters ===
The event was broadcast by ITV in the UK; Discovery+ and Eurosport in Europe (including the UK and Ireland); CCTV-5, Migu, Youku, and Huya in mainland China; DAZN in the US and Brazil; Now TV in Hong Kong; Astro SuperSport in Malaysia and Brunei; TrueVisions in Thailand; Sportcast in Taiwan; Premier Sports Network in the Philippines; Fastsports in Pakistan; and Matchroom.live in all other territories.

=== Seeding list ===
Unlike other events where the defending champion is seeded first, the reigning World Champion second, and the rest based on the world rankings, the qualification and seedings in the Players Series tournaments are determined by the one-year ranking list. The below list shows the top 32 players with the most ranking points acquired during the 2023‍–‍24 season, as of after the Scottish Open:

Seed	Player	Points
1	Judd Trump (ENG)	406,000
2	Ronnie O'Sullivan (ENG)	306,500
3	Zhang Anda (CHN)	260,500
4	Mark Williams (WAL)	173,000
5	Barry Hawkins (ENG)	159,500
6	Ding Junhui (CHN)	150,000
7	Tom Ford (ENG)	139,500
8	Ali Carter (ENG)	117,000
9	Mark Selby (ENG)	113,500
10	Gary Wilson (ENG)	104,000
11	Noppon Saengkham (THA)	89,000
12	John Higgins (SCO)	89,000
13	Hossein Vafaei (IRN)	89,000
14	Mark Allen (NIR)	88,500
15	Zhou Yuelong (CHN)	81,000
16	Lyu Haotian (CHN)	79,500

Seed	Player	Points
17	Chris Wakelin (ENG)	79,000
18	Stephen Maguire (SCO)	60,000
19	Jack Lisowski (ENG)	59,500
20	Matthew Selt (ENG)	58,000
21	Shaun Murphy (ENG)	56,500
22	Xiao Guodong (CHN)	56,500
23	David Gilbert (ENG)	53,000
24	Yuan Sijun (CHN)	50,500
25	Wu Yize (CHN)	50,000
26	Jordan Brown (NIR)	49,500
27	Ricky Walden (ENG)	48,000
28	Cao Yupeng (CHN)	48,000
29	Thepchaiya Un-Nooh (THA)	45,000
30	Dominic Dale (WAL)	44,000
31	Pang Junxu (CHN)	43,500
32	Jamie Jones (WAL)	42,000

=== Prize fund ===
The event featured a total prize fund of £380,000, with the winner receiving £100,000. The breakdown of prize money for the event is shown below:

- Winner: £100,000
- Runner-up: £40,000
- Semi-final: £20,000
- Quarter-final: £12,500
- Last 16: £7,500
- Last 32: £5,000
- Highest break: £10,000
- Total: £380,000

== Summary ==
=== Last 32 ===
The first round matches were played from 15 to 17 January. Cao Yupeng, seeded 28, defeated fifth seed Barry Hawkins 4‍–‍3. Shaun Murphy, seeded 21, whitewashed 12th seed John Higgins 4‍–‍0 in a match that lasted only 41 minutes, with Murphy making a century break of 145 in the first frame. Despite having problems with deteriorating eyesight, 48 year old Mark Williams beat Thepchaiya Un-Nooh 4‍–‍3, making a 134 break in the third frame. Mark Allen made three century breaks of 103, 110, and 108 in defeating Jack Lisowski 4‍–‍2.

=== Last 16 ===
The second round matches were played from 17 to 18 January. Judd Trump whitewashed Lyu Haotian 4‍–‍0, setting up a quarter final meeting with Mark Selby who defeated Ali Carter 4‍–‍3. There was also a 4‍–‍0 whitewash victory for Cao over Murphy. Zhang Anda defeated defending champion Allen 4‍–‍2, setting up a meeting with Ding Junhui in the quarter finals, after Ding beat Noppon Saengkham 4‍–‍1. Ronnie O'Sullivan defeated Zhou Yuelong 4‍–‍3.

=== Quarter finals ===
The quarter-finals were played from 18 to 19 January. In a dominant performance, Trump defeated Selby 5‍–‍1, making a 119 break in the fourth frame. Cao beat Williams 5‍–‍4 and O'Sullivan defeated Gary Wilson 5‍–‍1 making a 129 break in the third frame. Ding beat Zhang 5‍–‍2.

=== Semi finals ===
The semi-finals were played from 19 to 20 January. In the first semi-final, Trump beat Cao 6‍–‍2, making a 106 break in the second frame. In the second semi-final O'Sullivan defeated Ding 6‍–‍1 in only 1 hour and 12 minutes, making four centuries of 135, 128, 128, and 124.

=== Final ===
The final was played over two sessions between Trump and O'Sullivan on 21 January as the best of 19 frames. In the afternoon session, Trump won four frames in a row to lead 4‍–‍0 at the mid-session interval. O'Sullivan took the next two frames, making a 60 break in the sixth, to narrow the score to 4‍–‍2, and then to 5‍–‍3 at the end of the session. Trump made a break of 66 to win the opening frame of the evening session, advancing to 6‍–‍3. However, O'Sullivan won six consecutive frames, making breaks of 58, 74, 52, and 51, to lead by 9‍–‍6. Trump closed in to 9‍–‍7 by winning the 16th frame, but O'Sullivan took the next with a break of 52 to capture a 10‍–‍7 victory, claiming his third World Grand Prix title, and a record-extending 41st ranking title.

== Tournament draw ==
The draw for the tournament is shown below. Numbers in parentheses after the players' names denote the players' seedings, and players in bold denote match winners. The last-32 and last-16 matches were played as the best of seven frames; the quarter-finals were the best of nine frames; the semi-finals were the best of 11 frames, and the final was the best of 19 frames, played over two sessions.

**Last 32**; Best of 7 frames
**Judd Trump (ENG) (1)**	**4**
Jamie Jones (WAL) (32)	2
**Lyu Haotian (CHN) (16)**	**4**
Chris Wakelin (ENG) (17)	3
**Mark Selby (ENG) (9)**	**4**
Yuan Sijun (CHN) (24)	3
**Ali Carter (ENG) (8)**	**4**
Wu Yize (CHN) (25)	3
Barry Hawkins (ENG) (5)	3
**Cao Yupeng (CHN) (28)**	**4**
John Higgins (SCO) (12)	0
**Shaun Murphy (ENG) (21)**	**4**
**Hossein Vafaei (IRN) (13)**	**4**
Matthew Selt (ENG) (20)	3
**Mark Williams (WAL) (4)**	**4**
Thepchaiya Un-Nooh (THA) (29)	3
**Zhang Anda (CHN) (3)**	**4**
Dominic Dale (WAL) (30)	2
**Mark Allen (NIR) (14)**	**4**
Jack Lisowski (ENG) (19)	2
**Noppon Saengkham (THA) (11)**	**4**
Xiao Guodong (CHN) (22)	1
**Ding Junhui (CHN) (6)**	**4**
Ricky Walden (ENG) (27)	3
**Tom Ford (ENG) (7)**	**4**
Jordan Brown (NIR) (26)	1
**Gary Wilson (ENG) (10)**	**4**
David Gilbert (ENG) (23)	2
**Zhou Yuelong (CHN) (15)**	**4**
Stephen Maguire (SCO) (18)	1
**Ronnie O'Sullivan (ENG) (2)**	**4**
Pang Junxu (CHN) (31)	2

**Last 16**; Best of 7 frames
**(England) Judd Trump**	**4**
(China) Lyu Haotian	0
**(England) Mark Selby**	**4**
(England) Ali Carter	3
**(China) Cao Yupeng**	**4**
(England) Shaun Murphy	0
(Iran) Hossein Vafaei	1
**(Wales) Mark Williams**	**4**
**(China) Zhang Anda**	**4**
(Northern Ireland) Mark Allen	2
(Thailand) Noppon Saengkham	1
**(China) Ding Junhui**	**4**
(England) Tom Ford	2
**(England) Gary Wilson**	**4**
(China) Zhou Yuelong	3
**(England) Ronnie O'Sullivan**	**4**

**Quarter-finals**; Best of 9 frames
**(England) Judd Trump**	**5**
(England) Mark Selby	1
**(China) Cao Yupeng**	**5**
(Wales) Mark Williams	4
(China) Zhang Anda	2
**(China) Ding Junhui**	**5**
(England) Gary Wilson	1
**(England) Ronnie O'Sullivan**	**5**

**Semi-finals**; Best of 11 frames
**(England) Judd Trump**	**6**
(China) Cao Yupeng	2
(China) Ding Junhui	1
**(England) Ronnie O'Sullivan**	**6**

**Final**; Best of 19 frames
(England) Judd Trump	7
**(England) Ronnie O'Sullivan**	**10**

=== Final ===
Final: Best of 19 frames. Referee: Olivier Marteel; Leicester Arena, England, 21 January 2024
Judd Trump (1); England	7–**10**	**Ronnie O'Sullivan** (2); England
Afternoon: **74**–0, **102**–1, **72**–52, **85**–15, 18–**85**, 15–**114**, **102**–28, 33–**96**; Evening: **81**–45, 12–**114**, 0–**74**, 57–**64**, 0–**87**, 48–**58**, 62–**72**, **112**–0, 40–**79**
(frame 1) 74	Highest break	74 (frame 11)
0	Century breaks	0

== Century breaks ==
A total of 30 century breaks were made in the tournament.

- 145 – Shaun Murphy
- 137, 110, 108, 103 – Mark Allen
- 135, 129, 128, 128, 124, 111, 107 – Ronnie O'Sullivan
- 134, 108 – Mark Williams
- 134 – Hossein Vafaei
- 126 – Barry Hawkins
- 124 – Cao Yupeng
- 121 – Gary Wilson
- 119, 106 – Judd Trump
- 113 – Tom Ford
- 105, 100 – Mark Selby
- 105 – Pang Junxu
- 103 – Ali Carter
- 103 – Jamie Jones
- 102, 101 – Ding Junhui
- 102 – Zhou Yuelong
- 101 – Zhang Anda
