= 2024 Players Championship (snooker) =

2024 Johnstone's Paint Players Championship

Tournament information
- Dates: 19–25 February 2024
- Venue: Telford International Centre
- City: Telford
- Country: England
- Organisation: World Snooker Tour
- Format: Ranking event
- Total prize fund: £385,000
- Winner's share: £125,000
- Highest break: Mark Allen (NIR) (146)

Final
- Champion: Mark Allen (NIR)
- Runner-up: Zhang Anda (CHN)
- Score: 10‍–‍8

The 2024 Players Championship (officially the 2024 Johnstone's Paint Players Championship) was a professional snooker tournament that took place from 19 to 25 February 2024 at the Telford International Centre in Telford, England. The 14th ranking event of the 2023‍–‍24 season, following the Welsh Open and preceding the World Open, it was the second of three events in the Players Series, following the World Grand Prix and preceding the Tour Championship. Organised by the World Snooker Tour and sponsored by Johnstone's Paint, the event was broadcast by ITV and ITVX domestically, by Eurosport and Discovery+ in Europe, and by other broadcasters worldwide. The winner received £125,000 from a total prize fund of £385,000.

The event featured the top 16 players on the one-year ranking list as it stood after the Welsh Open. Shaun Murphy won the 2023 event, defeating Ali Carter 10‍–‍4 in the final, but he failed to qualify for the 2024 edition. The 2022 winner, Neil Robertson, and the reigning World Champion, Luca Brecel, also failed to qualify.

Players Championship debutant Zhang Anda reached his third ranking final of the season, and his career. But Mark Allen defeated Zhang 10‍–‍8 to win a second Players Championship title, his second ranking title of the season after the 2023 Shoot Out, and the 11th ranking title of his career.

The tournament produced 21 century breaks. Allen compiled three century breaks in a row during his first-round win over Mark Williams, including the tournament highest break of 146.

== Format ==
The event took place from 19 to 25 February 2024 at the Telford International Centre in Telford, England. It featured the top 16 players on the one‑year ranking list as it stood after the 2024 Welsh Open.

The matches were played as the best of 11 frames until the final, which was the best of 19 frames, played over two sessions. The 2023 champion was Shaun Murphy, who defeated Ali Carter 10‍–‍4 in that year's final. However, Murphy finished in 26th place on the one-year ranking list after his loss in the qualifying round at the Welsh Open, and thus failed to qualify for the 2024 event. The 2022 winner, Neil Robertson, and the reigning World Champion, Luca Brecel, also failed to qualify for the event, as they finished the Welsh Open ranked 68th and 39th respectively on the one-year list.

=== Broadcasters ===
The event was broadcast by ITV and ITVX in the UK; Eurosport and Discovery+ in Europe (excluding the UK and Ireland); Liaoning TV, Migu, and Huya in Mainland China; Now TV in Hong Kong; Astro SuperSport in Malaysia and Brunei; TrueVisions in Thailand; Sportcast in Taiwan; Premier Sports Network in the Philippines; Fastsports in Pakistan; and Matchroom.live in all other territories.

=== Prize fund ===
The event featured a prize pool of £385,000 with the winner receiving £125,000. The breakdown of prize money for the event is shown below:

- Winner: £125,000
- Runner-up: £50,000
- Semi-final: £30,000
- Quarter-final: £15,000
- Last 16: £10,000
- Highest break: £10,000
- Total: £385,000

=== Seeding list ===
Unlike other events where the defending champion is seeded first, the reigning World Champion second, and the rest based on the world rankings, the qualification and seedings in the Players Series tournaments are determined by the one-year ranking list. The below list shows the top-16 players with the most ranking points acquired during the 2023‍–‍24 season, as of after the 2024 Welsh Open:

Seed	Player	Points
1	Judd Trump (ENG)	526,000
2	Ronnie O'Sullivan (ENG)	406,500
3	Zhang Anda (CHN)	279,000
4	Gary Wilson (ENG)	196,500
5	Mark Williams (WAL)	193,000
6	Ding Junhui (CHN)	173,000
7	Barry Hawkins (ENG)	172,000
8	Tom Ford (ENG)	162,000

Seed	Player	Points
9	Ali Carter (ENG)	135,500
10	Mark Selby (ENG)	129,000
11	John Higgins (SCO)	122,500
12	Mark Allen (NIR)	114,500
13	Hossein Vafaei (IRN)	104,000
14	Noppon Saengkham (THA)	99,500
15	Zhou Yuelong (CHN)	93,000
16	Chris Wakelin (ENG)	90,000

== Summary ==
=== First round ===
The first-round matches were played from 19 to 21 February as the best of 11 frames. Facing two-time champion and top seed Judd Trump, Chris Wakelin opened the match with a century break of 120. From 2‍–‍2 at the mid-session interval, Trump won four frames in a row to capture a 6‍–‍2 victory, making a total clearance of 139 (Note: The break was incorrectly reported by Eurosport and World Snooker Tour as 132. World Snooker Tour's live score page and snooker.org correctly reported it as 139, as can be seen in the video of Trump's total clearance.) in the last frame. With the win, Trump extended his unbeaten professional record against Wakelin to 13 wins. The 2021 champion, John Higgins, faced Ding Junhui, winner of the 2013 event. Higgins won the first frame with a 102 break, and leveled the match at 2‍–‍2 at the mid-session interval. Ding made a 125 break to lead 3‍–‍2, and a 127 break to tie the scores at 4‍–‍4. Higgins took the ninth frame, then made a 100 break after a re-rack to win the tenth frame and the match 6‍–‍4. Higgins commended his opponent, saying: "It's a brilliant win, because I've always struggled with Ding. It is good to get the better of him in the last couple of matches we have faced each other. I rate him so highly."

Three-time World Champion Mark Williams played Mark Allen, winner of the 2016 event. Allen won the first three frames with consecutive century breaks of 146, 112, and 102. The 146 break was the highest break of the tournament. Williams won the next two frames, but Allen took three of the next four with breaks of 94, 70, and 68 for a 6‍–‍3 victory. Allen described his performance as "the best I've played since winning the Champion of Champions." The fourth seed Gary Wilson, who had advanced to a career high of 12th in the world rankings after his Welsh Open victory the previous week, faced Hossein Vafaei, who made his second appearance at the tournament. The scores were tied at 4‍–‍4, but Wilson won the next two frames, making a 95 break in the tenth, to secure a 6‍–‍4 victory.

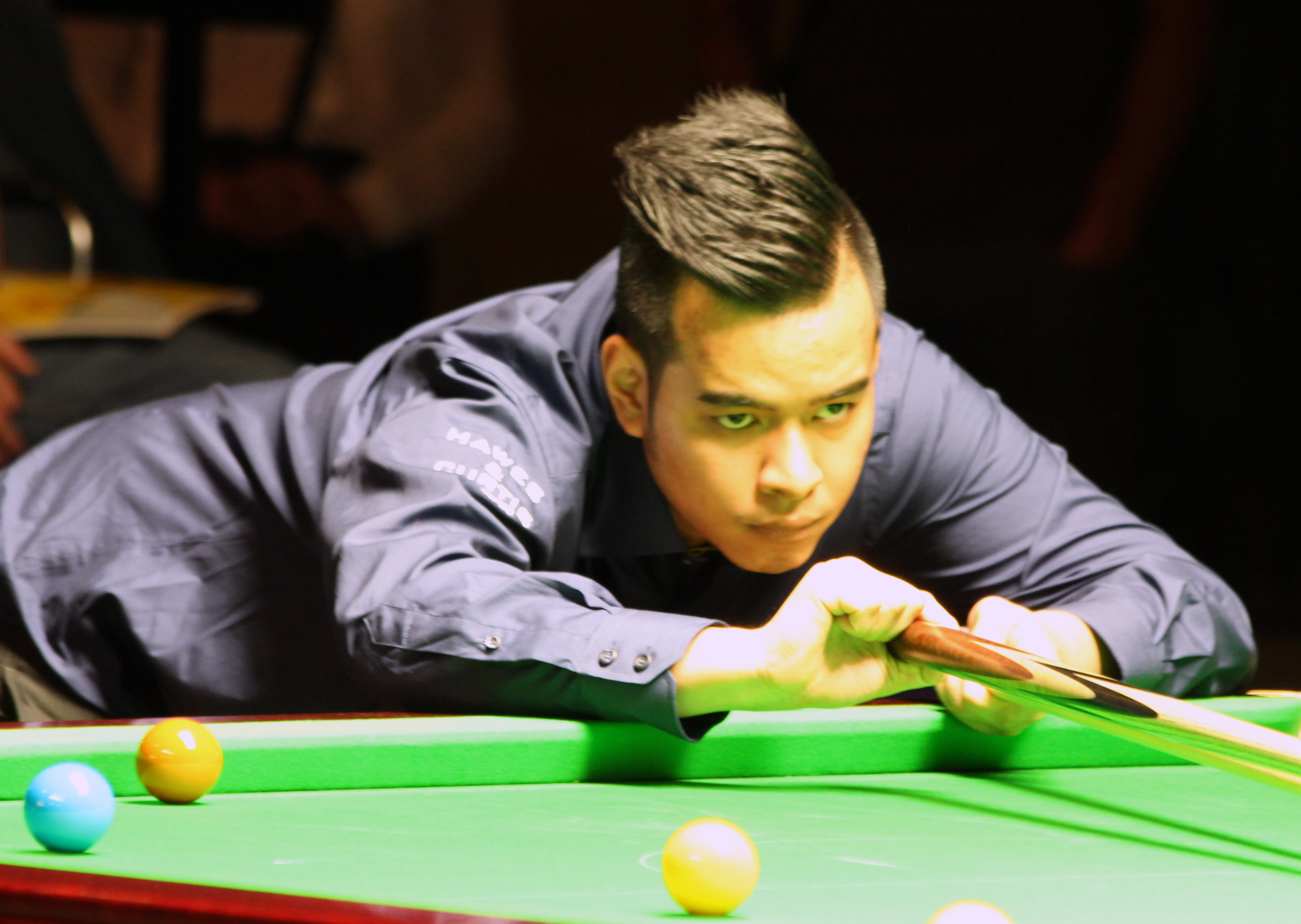
In a match between Players Championship debutants, Noppon Saengkham (pictured) lost 5‍–‍6 to tournament runner-up Zhang Anda.

World number one and second seed Ronnie O'Sullivan played Zhou Yuelong. The two had met twice previously in the 2023‍–‍24 season, with both matches ending in a deciding frame victory for O'Sullivan. Zhou opened the match with a 77 break and led 2‍–‍1, but O'Sullivan won five consecutive frames, making a 136 break in the sixth, to win 6‍–‍2. Commenting on his return to tournament play after withdrawing from the Welsh Open, O'Sullivan said: "I'm just trying to get away with playing as least as I can," describing his appearance at the Players Championship as "a bit of paid practice". Ali Carter, runner-up at the previous year's event, faced Tom Ford. The first two frames produced century breaks of 116 from Carter and 113 from Ford. The scores were tied at 2‍–‍2 at the mid-session interval, but Carter took four frames in a row to win 6‍–‍2.

Barry Hawkins, the winner of the 2014 event and runner-up in 2022, played four-time World Champion Mark Selby. The match was tied at 2‍–‍2 at the mid-session interval, and Hawkins won frame five with a 91 break to lead 3‍–‍2. However, Selby took four consecutive frames to win 6‍–‍3. The third seed Zhang Anda faced Noppon Saengkham, with both players making their Players Championship debut. Saengkham made a 99 break in the third frame to lead 3‍–‍1 at the mid-session interval, and Zhang won the next three frames for a 4‍–‍3 advantage. Saengkham won frames eight and nine with breaks of 94 and 60 to re-take the lead at 5‍–‍4, but Zhang leveled the score to force a decider, which he won with a 65 break for a 6‍–‍5 victory.

=== Quarter-finals ===
The quarter-finals were played from 21 to 23 February as the best of 11 frames. Trump played Carter in the first quarter-final. Earlier in the season, Trump defeated Carter 10‍–‍7 in the 2023 Wuhan Open final, and Carter won their quarter-final encounter at the 2024 Masters in a decider. The score was level at 2‍–‍2 at the mid-session interval. During the fifth frame, the cue ball was replaced by referee Leo Scullion, as both players agreed it was too light. Trump made a break of 115 in the sixth frame, but was trailing 3‍–‍5 after frame eight. Trump narrowed the score to 4‍–‍5, however, Carter won frame ten on the last black, after a safety battle on the yellow, to secure a 6‍–‍4 victory. Carter commented: "I'm very close to my best. I'm 45 this year and I'm in the top eight of the world, which isn't bad."

The second quarter-final was played between Allen and Wilson. Allen made breaks of 84, 63, and 75 to lead 3‍–‍1 at the mid-session interval. Wilson leveled the score at 3‍–‍3, but Allen won three of the next four frames to capture a 6‍–‍4 victory. Allen commented: "There were some long and drawn out frames. I felt Gary [Wilson] got the better of that. I should have closed it out 6‍–‍3, but I made a really good break in the last frame when the balls were awkward."

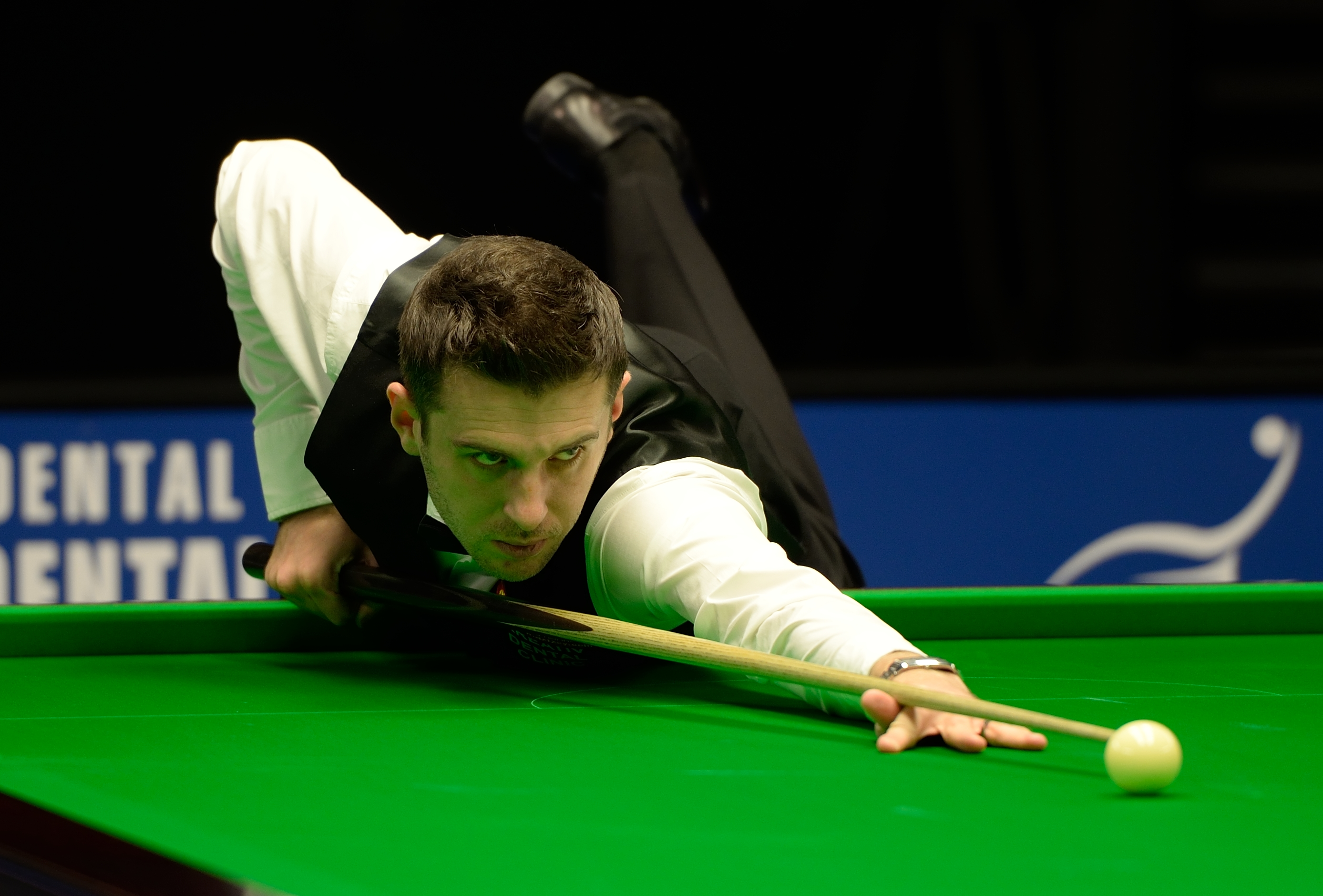
Mark Selby (pictured) whitewashed two-time Players champion Ronnie O'Sullivan, ending the latter's winning streak of 16 matches.

In the third quarter-final, Selby faced O'Sullivan. Selby won all four frames before the mid-session interval with breaks of 65, 91, 81, and 105, and took the fifth frame to lead 5‍–‍0. O'Sullivan was leading the sixth after making a 58 break, but Selby potted a long red and went on to win the frame on the last black, for a 6‍–‍0 victory. O'Sullivan's loss ended his run of 16 consecutive match wins, which included his tournament wins at the 2023 UK Championship, 2024 Masters, and 2024 World Grand Prix. Selby said after the match: "To beat Ronnie [O'Sullivan] in any tournament is a great scoreline, to beat him in the way I did, I am very, very pleased. It was more or less faultless." He added: "If you can't get up for playing Ronnie [O'Sullivan] with a full crowd, which he always brings, then you are in the wrong game. That is where you want to test yourself. You see where your game is at when you are put against the best. At the moment my game seems to be in a good place."

Zhang and Higgins contested the fourth quarter-final, in the first professional match between the two. The first frame was interrupted when a member of the audience fell ill, and the arena was evacuated. When play resumed, Higgins took the frame after both players missed chances to win. However, Zhang won five frames in a row with breaks of 102, 79, 84, 104, and 95 to lead 5‍–‍1. Higgins won the next three frames to narrow the score to 4‍–‍5, but Zhang took frame ten to capture a 6‍–‍4 victory. Commenting on the win over Higgins, who he described as his childhood hero, Zhang said: "I played pretty well, because I wanted to show what I can do in front of my hero. I was very dedicated to the job and I was able to concentrate on each shot. Even when he was coming back at me, I wasn't feeling nervous and I was very much enjoying watching his performance."

=== Semi-finals ===
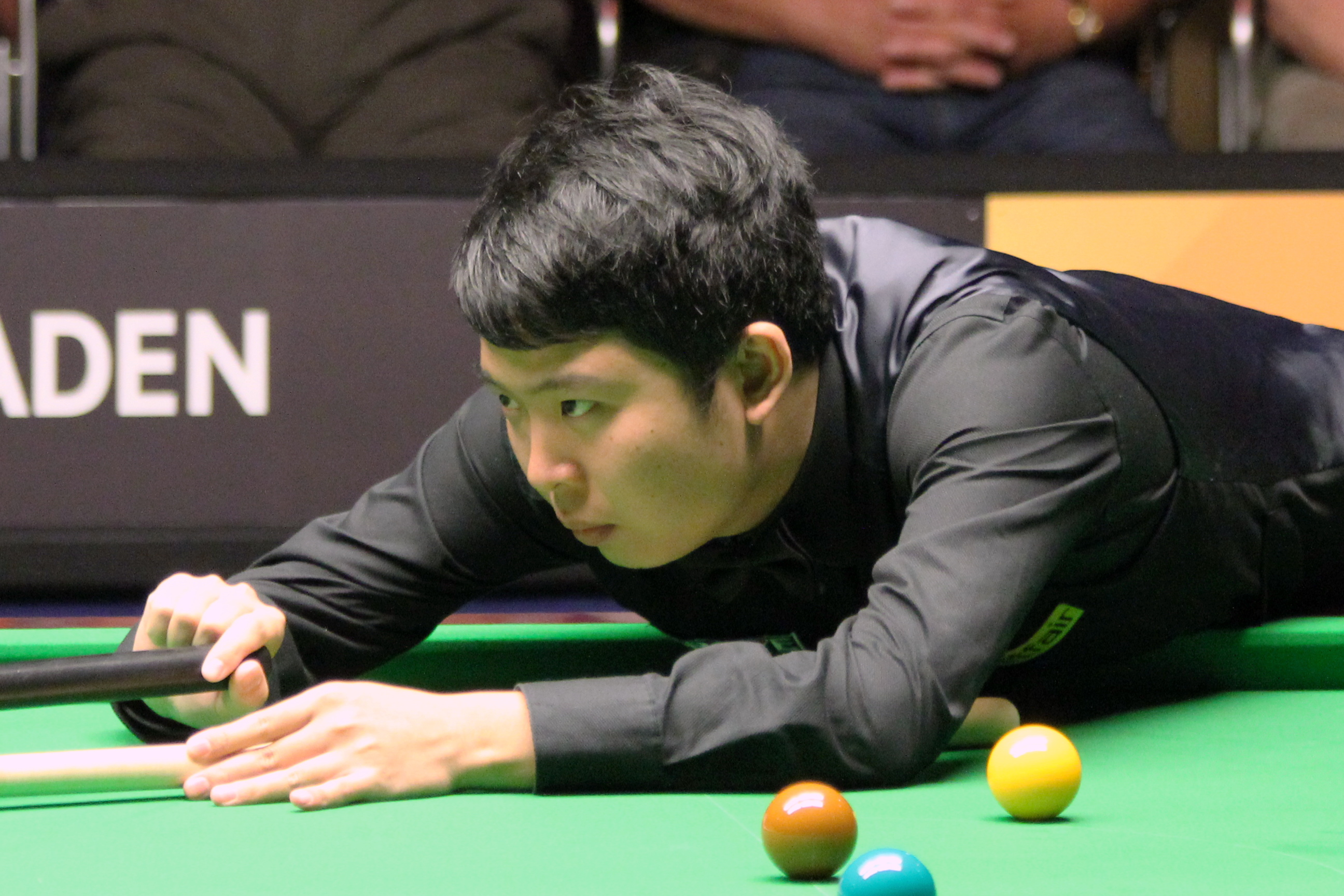
Players Championship debutant Zhang Anda (pictured) beat Mark Selby 6‍–‍5 to reach his third ranking final of the season and his career.

The semi-finals were played on 23 and 24 February as the best of 11 frames. Allen played Carter in the first semi-final. They shared the first two frames to draw the match at 1‍–‍1. Century breaks of 108 from Allen and 106 from Carter leveled the scores again at 2‍–‍2. From 3‍–‍3, Allen made breaks of 73 and 65 to lead 5‍–‍3, and went on to take the ninth frame on the last black for a 6‍–‍3 victory. Allen commented on the prospect of facing either Zhang or Selby in the final, saying: "From a completely selfish point of view, I'd rather play Zhang Anda. Just because that keeps Selby's losing streak going a little longer." He added: "Looking at the Tour Championship, China [World Open] and the World Championship, you want someone like Selby's confidence to be as low as possible."

Zhang faced Selby in the second semi-final. Zhang won all four frames before the mid-session interval, making breaks of 129, 80, 69, and 84, to lead 4‍–‍0, Selby having only potted a single ball. In the fifth frame, Zhang was leading by 56‍–‍0 but missed a pot, allowing Selby to make a clearance of 62 and win the frame on the last black. Selby won two more frames to trail 3‍–‍4, and made a 113 break in frame nine to trail 4‍–‍5. He then capitalised on Zhang's multiple mistakes in the tenth frame, winning on the colours to force a deciding frame. Zhang took the lead with a 50 break, and went on to win the frame after Selby missed a tricky brown into the middle pocket, claiming a 6‍–‍5 victory. By reaching his third career ranking final, which were all within the 2023‍–‍24 season, Zhang became the second Chinese player to make three ranking finals in a single season, since Ding in the 2013‍–‍14 season. Zhang commented: "He's [Selby's] a top player and I needed to bring my best to win, which I did before the mid-session. I was chased all the way. We both knew the brown in the last frame was a pressure shot. He could have won by potting it, but it wasn't easy."

=== Final ===
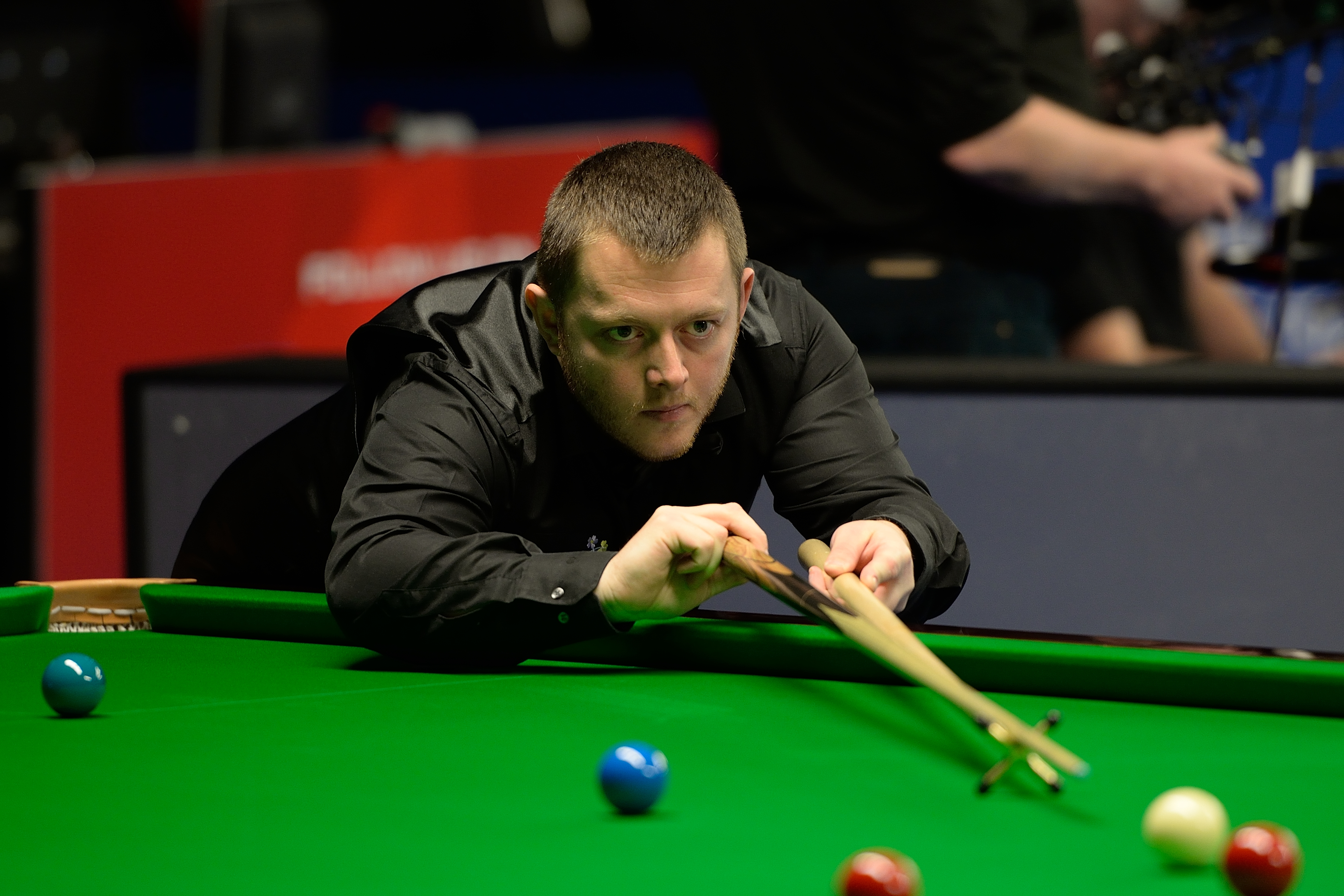
Mark Allen (pictured) compiled three consecutive century breaks to defeat Mark Williams, and went on to win his second Players Championship, beating Zhang Anda 10‍–‍8 in the final.

The final was contested between Allen and Zhang on 25 February as the best of 19 frames over two sessions, with Jan Verhaas officiating. In the first session, Zhang won the 37-minute-long opening frame, then made breaks of 82 and 70 to lead 3‍–‍0. However, Allen took the next three to level the match at 3‍–‍3, making a 101 break in the sixth, the only century break of the match. Zhang took the lead again at 4‍–‍3, but Allen won the eighth frame on the last black to leave the scores even at 4‍–‍4 at the end of the session.

The first four frames of the second session were shared to level the match at 6‍–‍6 at the mid-session interval, as both players made multiple errors and struggled to win frames in a single visit. When play resumed, Zhang made a 30 break before inadvertently potting a red when cannoning into the pack of reds off of the blue ball, and Allen took the frame with a break of 64, the second of only two 50+ breaks he made in the match. Allen won the 14th frame on the last black, and the 16th on the last pink to lead 9‍–‍7. The 37-minute-long frame 17 went to Zhang, but Allen won the next to capture a 10‍–‍8 victory. It was Allen's second Players Championship title, his second ranking title of the season after the 2023 Shoot Out, and the 11th ranking title of his career. Allen commented: "It was tough all day and with how well Zhang has played all week, I think I actually dragged him down a little bit. I gave it everything, my safety was good, it really kept me in the match. It wasn't a lot of fun to be involved in but I'm really happy to be standing here as the winner." He added: "This is what I've always wanted to do. Picking up one tournament every two or three seasons wasn't where I wanted to be. I always wanted to be a consistent winner."

== Tournament draw ==
Numbers in parentheses after the players' names denote the players' seedings, and players in bold denote match winners. All matches were played as the best of 11 frames except the final, which was played as the best of 19 frames.

**First round** Best of 11 frames
**Judd Trump (ENG) (1)**	**6**
Chris Wakelin (ENG) (16)	2
Tom Ford (ENG) (8)	2
**Ali Carter (ENG) (9)**	**6**
Mark Williams (WAL) (5)	3
**Mark Allen (NIR) (12)**	**6**
**Gary Wilson (ENG) (4)**	**6**
Hossein Vafaei (IRN) (13)	4
**Zhang Anda (CHN) (3)**	**6**
Noppon Saengkham (THA) (14)	5
Ding Junhui (CHN) (6)	4
**John Higgins (SCO) (11)**	**6**
Barry Hawkins (ENG) (7)	3
**Mark Selby (ENG) (10)**	**6**
**Ronnie O'Sullivan (ENG) (2)**	**6**
Zhou Yuelong (CHN) (15)	2

**Quarter-finals**; Best of 11 frames
(England) Judd Trump (1)	4
**(England) Ali Carter (9)**	**6**
**(Northern Ireland) Mark Allen (12)**	**6**
(England) Gary Wilson (4)	4
**(China) Zhang Anda (3)**	**6**
(Scotland) John Higgins (11)	4
**(England) Mark Selby (10)**	**6**
(England) Ronnie O'Sullivan (2)	0

**Semi-finals**; Best of 11 frames
(England) Ali Carter (9)	3
**(Northern Ireland) Mark Allen (12)**	**6**
**(China) Zhang Anda (3)**	**6**
(England) Mark Selby (10)	5

**Final**; Best of 19 frames
**(Northern Ireland) Mark Allen (12)**	**10**
(China) Zhang Anda (3)	8

Match details from WST for the first round, the quarter-finals, the semi-finals, and the final.

=== Final ===
Final
Final: Best of 19 frames. Referee: Jan Verhaas; Telford International Centre, Telford, England, 25 February 2024
**Mark Allen** (12); Northern Ireland	**10**–8	Zhang Anda (3); China
Afternoon: 43–**61**, 0–**82**, 24–**70**, **69**–0, **79**–51, **101**–1 (101), 0–**86**, **54**–51; Evening: **68**–23, 6–**75**, 28–**85**, **73**–19, **69**–30, **65**–56, 7–**58**, **64**–51, 44–**66**, **67**–0
(frame 6) **101**	Highest break	82 (frame 2)
**1**	Century breaks	0

== Century breaks ==
A total of 21 century breaks were made in the tournament.

- 146, 112, 108, 102, 101 – Mark Allen
- 139, 115 – Judd Trump
- 136 – Ronnie O'Sullivan
- 129, 104, 102 – Zhang Anda
- 127, 125 – Ding Junhui
- 120 – Chris Wakelin
- 116, 106 – Ali Carter
- 113, 105 – Mark Selby
- 113 – Tom Ford
- 102, 100 – John Higgins
