= 2024 Welsh Open (snooker) =

Snooker tournament

2024 BetVictor Welsh Open

Tournament information
- Dates: 12–18 February 2024
- Venue: Venue Cymru
- City: Llandudno
- Country: Wales
- Organisation: World Snooker Tour
- Format: Ranking event
- Total prize fund: £427,000
- Winner's share: £80,000
- Highest break: Gary Wilson (ENG) (147)

Final
- Champion: Gary Wilson (ENG)
- Runner-up: Martin O'Donnell (ENG)
- Score: 9–4

The 2024 Welsh Open (officially the 2024 BetVictor Welsh Open) was a professional snooker tournament that took place from 12 to 18 February 2024 at Venue Cymru in Llandudno, Wales. Qualifiers took place from 25 to 27 January at the Barnsley Metrodome in Barnsley, England. The 33rd edition of the Welsh Open, first held in 1992, it was the 13th ranking event of the 2023–24 season, following the German Masters and preceding the Players Championship. It was the fourth and last tournament in the Home Nations Series and the eighth and last tournament in the season's European Series. Sponsored by BetVictor, the tournament was broadcast by the BBC and DMAX domestically, by Eurosport and Discovery+ in the United Kingdom and Europe, and by other broadcasters worldwide. The winner received the Ray Reardon Trophy and £80,000 from a total prize fund of £427,000.

Robert Milkins was the defending champion, having defeated Shaun Murphy 9–7 in the final of the 2023 event, but he lost 0–4 to Gary Wilson in the last 16. Wilson went on to win the tournament with a 9–4 victory over first‑time ranking finalist Martin O'Donnell. It was the third ranking title of his career, following his wins at the Scottish Open in 2022 and 2023. He advanced to a career high of 12th in the world rankings after his win.

The tournament's main stage produced a total of 52 century breaks, the highest of which was a maximum break by Gary Wilson in the second frame of his semi‑final match against John Higgins. It was Wilson's fifth maximum break in professional competition and the 11th maximum in Welsh Open history. Mark Allen made the 600th century break of his professional career in his last‑64 match against Ma Hailong. The qualifiers produced an additional 14 centuries, the highest being a 146 break by Robbie Williams in his match against Peng Yisong.

== Overview ==
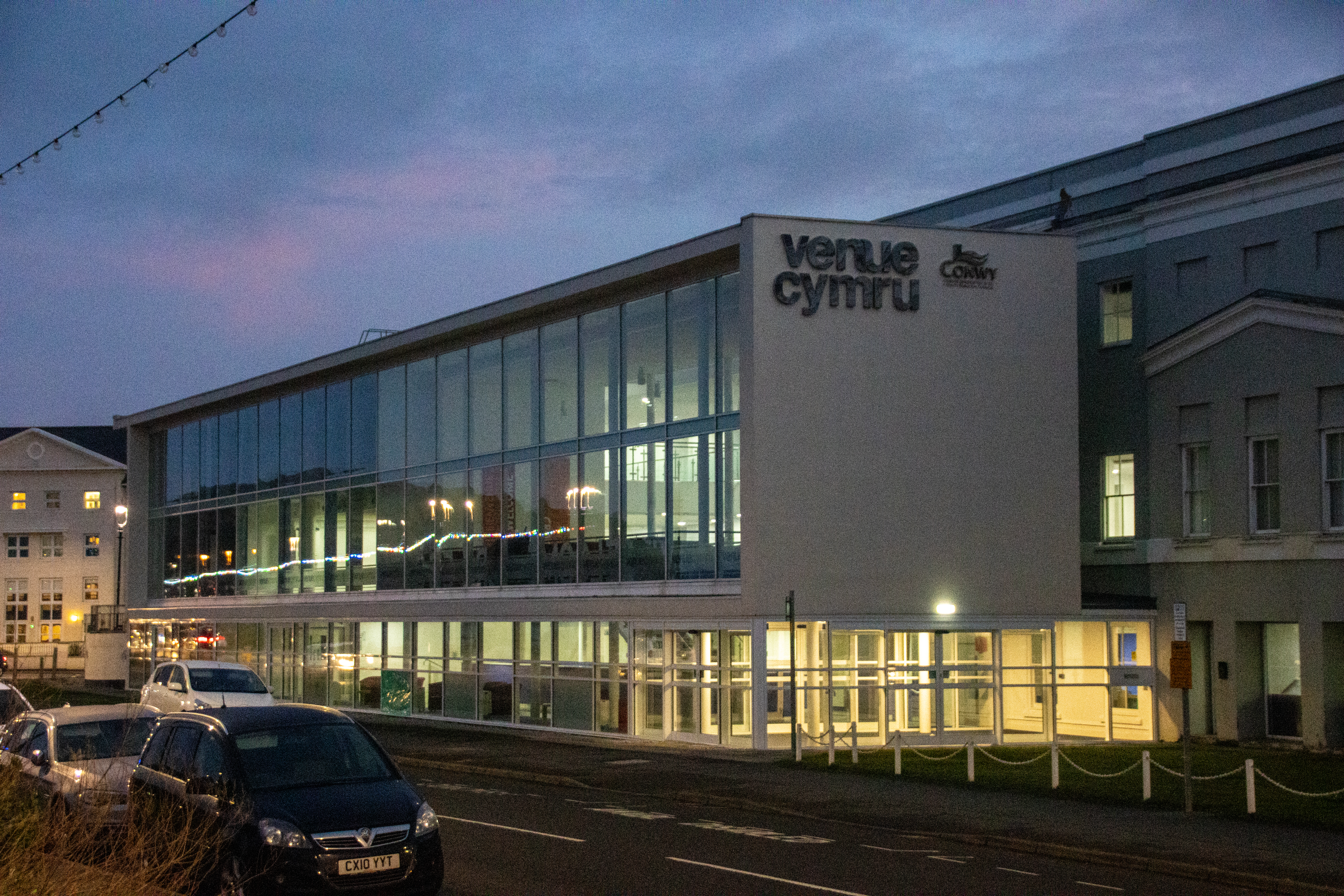
Venue Cymru in Llandudno, Wales, where the tournament was staged.

The event was the 33rd consecutive edition of the Welsh Open since it was first played in 1992, making it snooker's third-longest-running ranking tournament after the World Championship and UK Championship. The fourth and last event in the season's Home Nations Series, the eighth and last event in the European Series, and the 13th ranking tournament of the 2023–24 season, it took place from 12 to 18 February 2024 at Venue Cymru in Llandudno, Wales. The defending champion was Robert Milkins, who defeated Shaun Murphy 9–7 in the 2023 final.

=== Format ===
Qualifiers took place from 25 to 27 January at the Barnsley Metrodome in Barnsley, England. Qualifying matches involving the top 16 players in the world rankings and two Welsh wildcards (Riley Powell and Liam Davies) were held over and played at the main venue in Llandudno. All matches were played as the best of seven frames until the quarter‑finals, which were the best of nine. The semi‑finals were the best of 11, and the final was played as the best of 17 frames, held over two sessions.

=== Broadcasters ===
The main stage of the event was broadcast by BBC Wales, BBC Online, BBC Red Button, and DMAX in the United Kingdom; Eurosport and Discovery+ in the rest of Europe; CCTV-5, Migu, and Huya in mainland China; Now TV in Hong Kong; Astro SuperSport in Malaysia and Brunei; TrueVisions in Thailand; Sportcast in Taiwan; Premier Sports Network in the Philippines; Fastsports in Pakistan; and Matchroom.live in all other territories.

The qualifying matches were broadcast by Discovery+ in Europe (including the United Kingdom); Migu and Huya in China; and Matchroom.live in all other territories.

=== Prize fund ===
The tournament winner received the Ray Reardon Trophy. The breakdown of prize money for the event is shown below:

- Winner: £80,000
- Runner-up: £35,000
- Semi-final: £17,500
- Quarter-final: £11,000
- Last 16: £7,500
- Last 32: £4,500
- Last 64: £3,000
- Highest break: £5,000
- Total: £427,000

== Summary ==
=== Qualifying ===
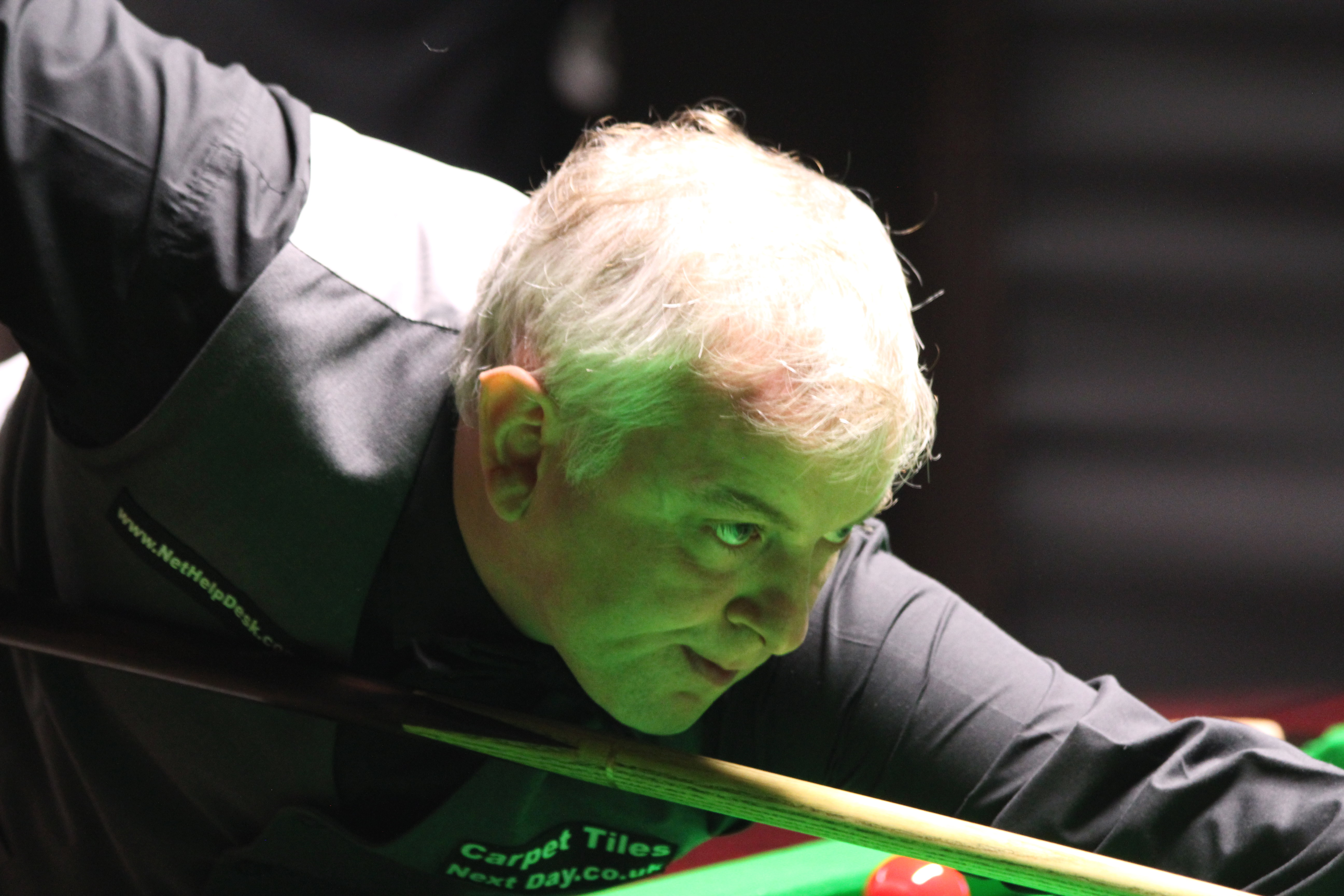
Amateur player Barry Pinches (pictured in 2016) replaced David Grace, who withdrew. Pinches defeated the 2020 champion and seventh seed Shaun Murphy 4–3 on the last black.

Qualifying took place from 25 to 27 January at the Barnsley Metrodome in Barnsley, England. Martin Gould withdrew for medical reasons and was replaced by Sydney Wilson. Si Jiahui won three frames in a row to defeat Stephen Maguire 4–2, while Matthew Stevens made back-to-back century breaks of 137 and 120 as he defeated Louis Heathcote 4–3. Robbie Williams made a 146 break, the highest of his career and the highest of the qualifying stage, as he whitewashed Peng Yisong. The 2021 champion Jordan Brown lost the first three frames against Lyu Haotian but recovered to win four consecutive frames, taking the deciding frame on the last black. Stuart Bingham and Zhou Yuelong received warnings for conceding frames before the snookers required stage in their respective defeats to Marco Fu and Adam Duffy. Fan Zhengyi defeated the 2022 champion Joe Perry 4–2. David Gilbert made a 136 break as he whitewashed Ken Doherty, who scored only 15 points in the match. Three-time winner Stephen Hendry lost 2–4 to Ross Muir.

Qualifying matches featuring the top 16 seeds and two Welsh wildcards were held over and played in Llandudno on 12 and 13 February. The top two players in the world rankings, Ronnie O'Sullivan and Judd Trump, withdrew from the tournament and were replaced respectively by Alfie Davies and Duane Jones, both Welsh amateurs. David Grace also withdrew and was replaced by amateur Barry Pinches, who came from 2–3 behind to defeat the seventh seed Shaun Murphy, winning the deciding frame on the last black after requiring a snooker. The defending champion Robert Milkins trailed Jamie Jones 2–3 but won the match after taking the deciding frame on the colours. Neil Robertson made eight breaks of 50 or more, including a 103, as he defeated Jackson Page 4–1. Barry Hawkins made a 142 break as he whitewashed He Guoqiang. The reigning World Champion Luca Brecel won his first professional match in two months as he defeated Jiang Jun in a decider. Mark Selby defeated Yuan Sijun 4–2, winning the match in the 69-minute sixth frame after Yuan failed six times to escape from a snooker on the last blue ball. Elliot Slessor defeated the 11th seed Ali Carter 4–1.

=== Early rounds ===
==== Last 64 ====
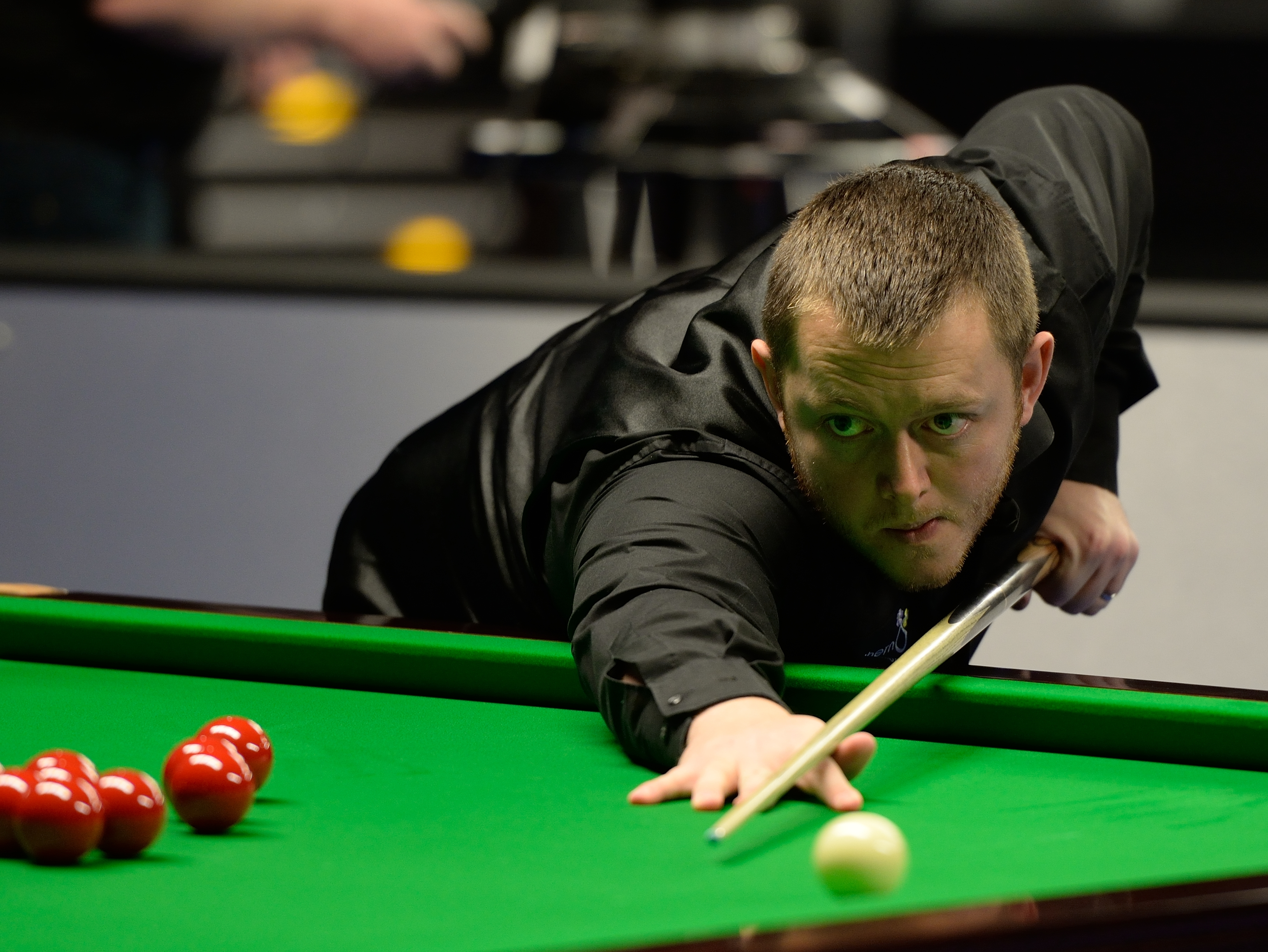
Mark Allen (pictured in 2015) compiled his 600th career century break during his whitewash win over Ma Hailong.

The last-64 matches were played from 12 to 14 February as the best of seven frames. The defending champion Milkins made breaks of 140 and 83 to defeat Allan Taylor. Xiao Guodong made a 134 break to tie the scores at 3–3 against Hawkins, but Hawkins won the deciding frame. Jamie Clarke was whitewashed by Duffy. Gary Wilson made two century breaks of 120 and 105 in his 4–2 win over Iulian Boiko, and Mark Williams defeated Sanderson Lam 4–3, making breaks of 90, 117, and 96. Robbie Williams defeated the 12th seed Ding Junhui 4–2, making a 119 break in the fifth frame. Ricky Walden lost the first three frames against Stevens but recovered to win the match by taking four consecutive frames. Martin O'Donnell made breaks of 113 and 97 as he defeated Chris Wakelin 4–1. Mark Allen whitewashed tour debutant Ma Hailong, making a total clearance of 141 in the third frame, the 600th century of his professional career. Jack Lisowski beat Liam Pullen 4–2, winning the final frame on the last black.

Elliot Slessor received a walkover to the last 32 after Andrew Higginson withdrew. Higginson's father, Dave Higginson, died on the morning of 14 February. Stan Moody made a 103 break to tie the scores at 2–2 against Brown and went on to win in a deciding frame. Facing Dominic Dale, Alfie Davies made a 125 break in the first frame and led 3–1, but Dale recovered to win the match in a decider. Brecel made breaks of 83, 119, 62, and 75 as he whitewashed Joe O'Connor, who scored only 29 points in the match. Kyren Wilson made a 111 break to win the first frame against Anthony Hamilton, but Hamilton won four frames in a row for a 4–1 victory. After losing the first two frames, Graeme Dott won four in a row to defeat Wu Yize 4–2, while Dylan Emery beat Noppon Saengkham by the same score, making a 121 break in the sixth frame. Jak Jones defeated the 14th seed Zhang Anda 4–1. The sixth seed Selby lost 2–4 to Aaron Hill in a match that included a 10-minute safety battle on the last green in the fourth frame. Afterwards, Hill commented: "Mark [Selby] is one of the greats and one of the players I look up to, I know my game is good enough to be beating them."

==== Last 32 ====
The last-32 matches were played from 14 to 15 February as the best of seven frames. Anthony McGill defeated the ninth seed and two-time winner Mark Williams 4–1. Matthew Selt made a 135 break in his 4–1 win over Duane Jones. Robbie Williams defeated Duffy 4–2. Milkins made breaks of 77 and 91 as he whitewashed Gilbert. Higgins defeated Ryan Day 4–1, making a 124 break in the third frame, and Allen made breaks of 63, 76, 110, and 52 to defeat Si 4–1. Neil Robertson made breaks of 68 and 69 to win the first two frames against Walden, but Walden took four consecutive frames with breaks of 96, 68, 69, and 65 to win 4–2. Trailing Wilson 1–3, Lisowski won the next two frames with breaks of 65 and 113, but Wilson won the deciding frame on the colours.

After losing the first two frames to Daniel Wells, Fu tied the scores with back-to-back centuries of 122 and 113 and went on to win 4–2. Hossein Vafaei made a 116 break against Jak Jones, but Jones won 4–2. Dale defeated Moody 4–1, making a 122 break in the second frame. Hamilton won the first two frames against O'Donnell, taking the first frame after two re-racks and the second with a 133 break. However, O'Donnell won four frames in a row, making breaks of 71, 62, and 110, as he secured a 4–2 victory. Tom Ford defeated Hawkins 4–1. Fan lost the first frame to Hill, but took the next four with breaks of 80, 59, 97, and 79 to win 4–1. Brecel defeated Dott 4–1 and Slessor beat Emery by the same score.

==== Last 16 ====
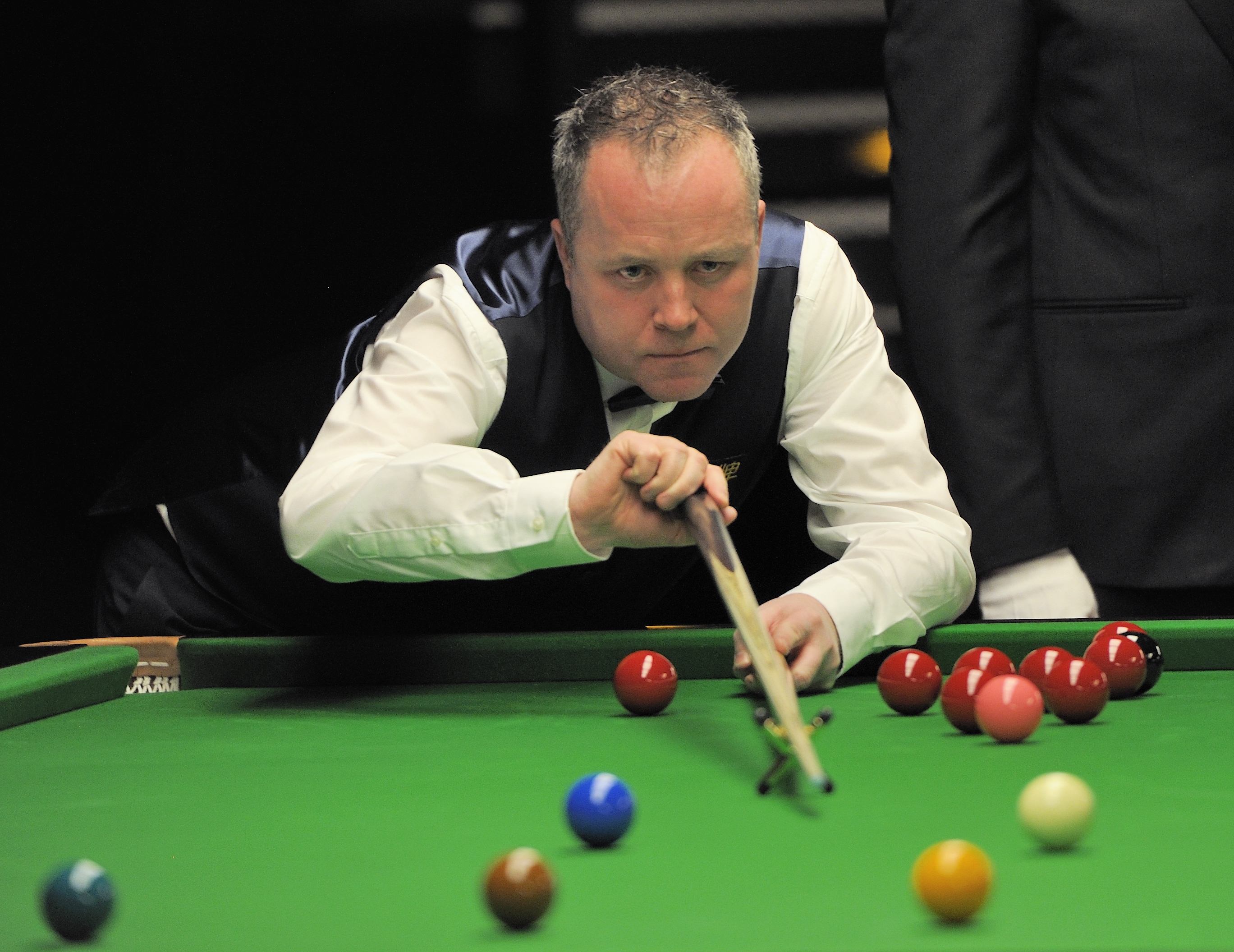
John Higgins (pictured in 2014) recovered from a 1–3 deficit to beat Matthew Selt 4–3, winning the deciding frame on the colours.

The last-16 matches were played on 15 February as the best of seven frames. Allen made a 110 break in the fourth frame to complete a whitewash win over Robbie Williams. Allen said: "I have come here to win, it would be great to add another Home Nations title to my cabinet. I am fighting for everything out there, choosing the correct shots and giving it my best." Wilson eliminated the defending champion Milkins, also with a whitewash. Trailing McGill 0–2, Walden made breaks of 138 and 99 as he won three frames in a row to lead McGill 3–2, but McGill took the last two frames for a 4–3 victory. Brecel lost the first frame to Ford but won four consecutive frames to reach his first ranking quarter-final of the season.

From 1–3 behind against Selt, Higgins tied the scores at 3–3 and the match went to a deciding frame that lasted over 40 minutes. Higgins secured victory after Selt missed the last yellow. Dale whitewashed Jones, and commented: "To win another ranking title would be unthinkable for me, at my age. But to do it in the Welsh Open would be the icing on the cake." Slessor won a deciding frame against Fan with a 77 break, and O'Donnell defeated Fu 4–2.

=== Later rounds ===
==== Quarter-finals ====
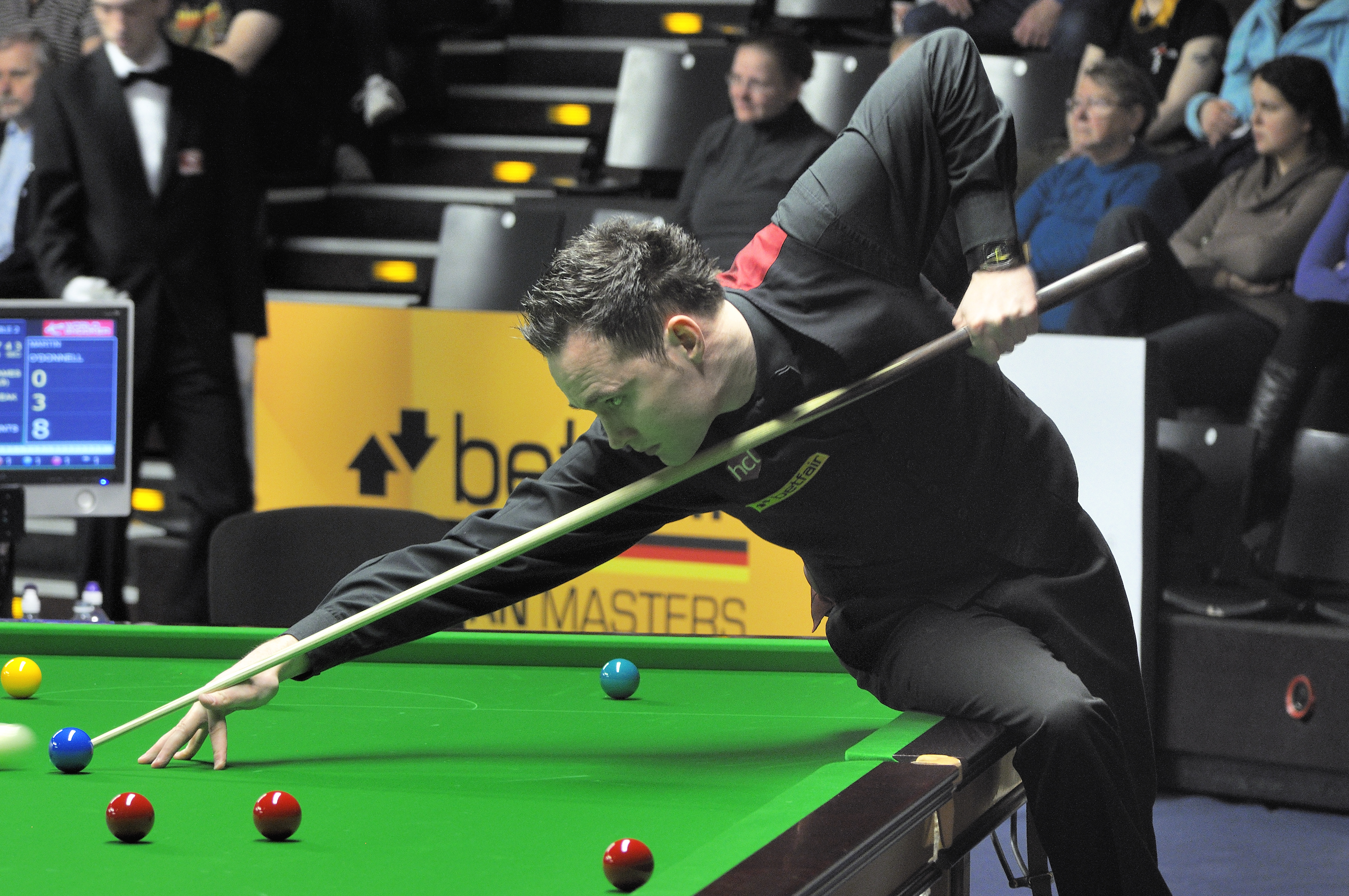
The world number 76 Martin O'Donnell (pictured in 2013) defeated the reigning World Champion Luca Brecel 5–3. O'Donnell went on to reach the first ranking final of his career.

The quarter-finals were played on 16 February as the best of nine frames. Higgins made breaks of 62 and 131 as he won the first two frames against Allen. Allen tied the scores at the mid-session interval but Higgins won three consecutive frames for a 5–2 victory, reaching his fourth ranking semi-final of the season. Higgins commented: "[Allen] is one of the elite players, you have to play well to beat him. It's a brilliant win for me." He attributed the win to his new cue, saying: "I went back to the size I used about 25 years ago. That seems to be working right now. Hopefully things can come together because I have been knocking on the door for a while and it hasn't opened yet." Slessor compiled a 128 break as he took a 3–1 lead over Dale. Dale won two of the next three frames, but Slessor took the eighth to win 5–3 and reach the third ranking semi-final of his career. Saying he was "delighted to win", Slessor commented: "I have been working with [coach] Chris Henry this season and my game has turned a corner."

Wilson won all four frames before the mid-session interval to lead McGill 4–0 and won the fifth on the last black to complete a whitewash victory. He said after the match: "I have tried to stick to what I'm doing, because it was working at the [2023 Scottish Open]. That has helped me to just go out and play without any rubbish in my head, and to be a bit more consistent. In the past I would not be able to play certain shots, but I don't feel that way any more." The reigning World Champion Brecel led the world number 76 O'Donnell 2–1 and 3–2, but O'Donnell took the next two frames, making a 130 break in the sixth, to lead 4–3. O'Donnell then took frame eight on the last black to win 5–3. It was his second win over Brecel that season, after a 4–2 victory in the last 32 of the 2023 Scottish Open. O'Donnell reached his second career ranking semi-final, after the 2018 Shoot Out. He commented: "I do try hard out there, sometimes too hard. I still try to play as if it means everything, but I am able to handle defeats better and move on. I have played a bit quicker too and that seems to be helping."

==== Semi-finals ====
The semi-finals were played on 17 February as the best of 11 frames. In the first semi-final, O'Donnell took a 5–3 lead over Slessor. Slessor made breaks of 95 and 65 to force a deciding frame, but O'Donnell won the decider with a 126 break to reach the first ranking final of his career. He commented: "It means everything to reach my first final. There have been some dark times in the last few years. My fiancée Anna and kids have picked me up and got me through those dark days." Calling his performance "useless" and describing his safety play as "embarrassing", Slessor said: "I have played some good stuff this week but it's very disappointing to play like that in the semis."

In the second semi-final, Wilson faced Higgins, a five-time winner of the event. Wilson attempted a maximum break in the first frame, but missed the 14th red to end the break on 104. Wilson successfully completed a maximum in the second frame, the fifth of his career and the 11th time a maximum had been made at the Welsh Open. Wilson led 4–0 and 5–1 before Higgins won three frames in a row with breaks of 69, 66, and 78 to come within one frame at 5–4. Wilson took the 10th frame with a 73 break to win 6–4. Wilson said: "I didn't do a lot wrong and played very well in patches." He added: "The 147 was early in the match, I wasn't even thinking about it at the start, I was just looking to build a lead." Higgins commented: "He was deadly for the first three-and-a-half frames, incredible. [Wilson] played superbly. I give him credit, there was nothing I could do."

==== Final ====
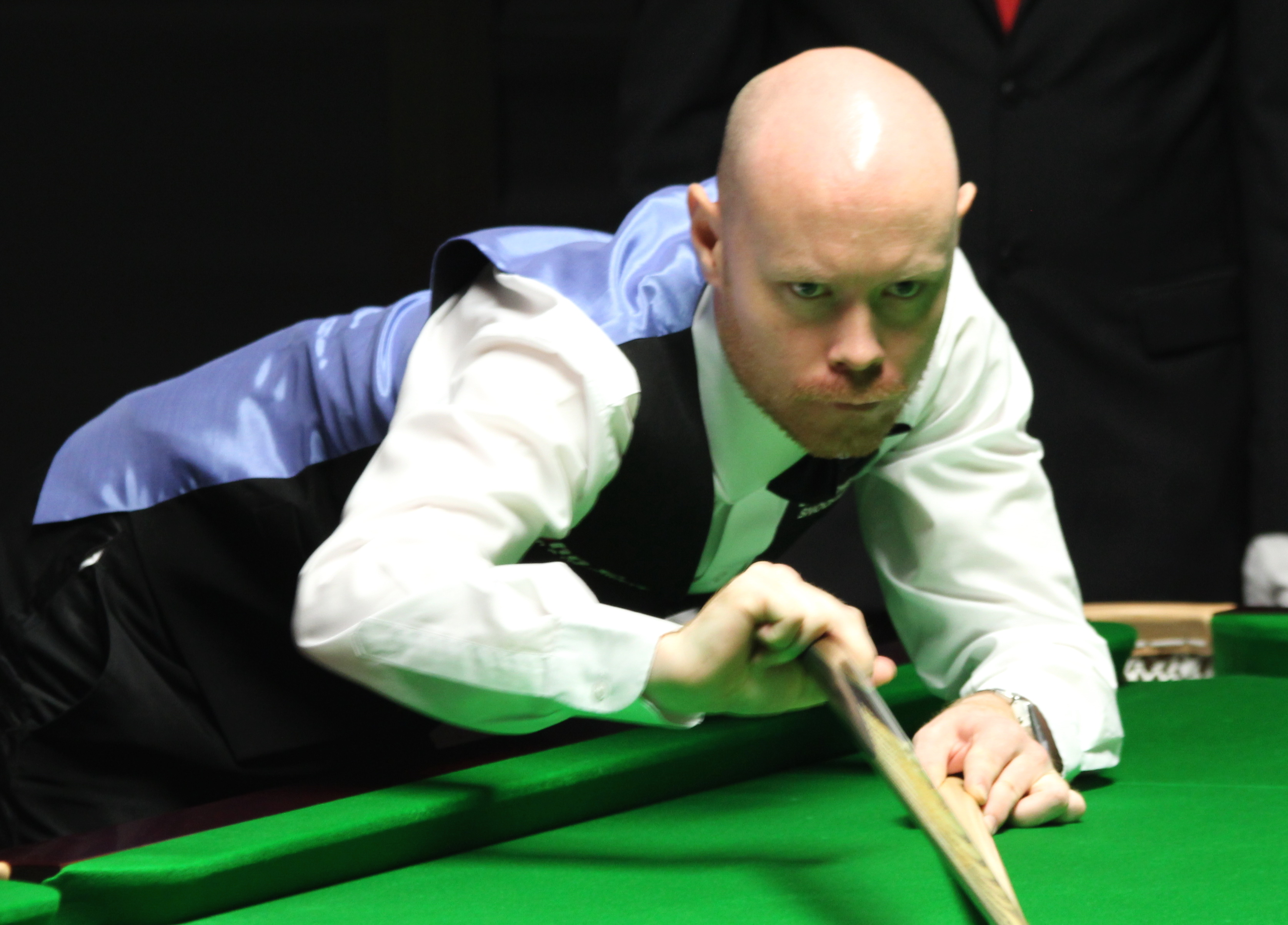
Gary Wilson (pictured in 2016) made a maximum break in the semi-finals and went on to secure his first Welsh Open title, beating Martin O'Donnell 9–4 in the final.

The final was a best-of-17-frames match, played over two sessions on 18 February, between the world number 16 Wilson and the world number 76 O'Donnell, with Leo Scullion officiating. Wilson competed in his fifth ranking final, while O'Donnell contested his first. Wilson made a 98 break in the opening frame and produced three further half-century breaks to lead 4–0 and 5–1. O'Donnell was six points ahead in the seventh frame when he missed a pot on the last yellow; Wilson cleared the colours to lead 6–1. O'Donnell made a 92 break to win the last frame of the afternoon session, leaving Wilson with a four-frame advantage at 6–2.

When play resumed for the evening session, O'Donnell won the 41-minute ninth frame after a re-rack. Wilson took the 10th with a 100 break, the only century of the final. O'Donnell won the 11th with an 85 break, but Wilson won the 43-minute 12th frame to lead 8–4 and went on to complete a 9–4 victory. It was Wilson's first Welsh Open title and his third ranking title, following his wins at the Scottish Open in 2022 and 2023. His second ranking title of the season, it advanced him to a career high of 12th in the world rankings. Wilson called the final a "scrappy game" and commented: "I lost my cue action in the last few frames. You go through ups and downs all the time—I'm just happy to get over the line and get another tournament." Runner-up O'Donnell, who moved up to 60th in the rankings after the tournament, congratulated his opponent but expressed disappointment with his own performance, saying: "I felt okay at the start but then started missing too many easy balls and got tense. I will learn from today and hopefully there are good things coming for me."

== Main draw ==
Numbers in parentheses after the players' names denote the top 32 seeded players, and players in bold denote match winners. All matches were played as the best of seven frames until the quarter-finals, which were the best of nine. The semi-finals were the best of 11, and the final was a best-of-17-frames match played over two sessions.

=== Top half ===
**Last 64**; Best of 7 frames
**Robert Milkins (ENG) (1)**	**4**
Allan Taylor (ENG)	1
**David Gilbert (ENG) (32)**	**4**
Oliver Lines (ENG)	2
**Jack Lisowski (ENG) (16)**	**4**
Liam Pullen (ENG)	2
**Gary Wilson (ENG) (17)**	**4**
Iulian Boiko (UKR) (Note: Iulian Boiko replaced Muhammad Asif, who withdrew.)	2
**Anthony McGill (SCO) (24)**	**4**
Long Zehuang (CHN)	1
**Mark Williams (WAL) (9)**	**4**
Sanderson Lam (ENG)	3
**Ricky Walden (ENG) (25)**	**4**
Matthew Stevens (WAL)	3
**Neil Robertson (AUS) (8)**	**4**
Stuart Carrington (ENG)	3
**Mark Allen (NIR) (5)**	**4**
Ma Hailong (CHN)	0
**Si Jiahui (CHN) (28)**	**4**
Andrew Pagett (WAL)	2
Ding Junhui (CHN) (12)	2
**Robbie Williams (ENG)**	**4**
Jamie Clarke (WAL)	0
**Adam Duffy (ENG)**	**4**
**Ryan Day (WAL) (20)**	**4**
David Lilley (ENG)	2
**John Higgins (SCO) (13)**	**4**
Tian Pengfei (CHN)	1
**Matthew Selt (ENG) (29)**	**4**
Ross Muir (SCO)	1
**Duane Jones (WAL) (Note: Duane Jones replaced Judd Trump, who withdrew.)**	**4**
Liam Davies (WAL)	1

**Last 32**; Best of 7 frames
**(England) Robert Milkins**	**4**
(England) David Gilbert	0
(England) Jack Lisowski	3
**(England) Gary Wilson**	**4**
**(Scotland) Anthony McGill**	**4**
(Wales) Mark Williams	1
**(England) Ricky Walden**	**4**
(Australia) Neil Robertson	2
**(Northern Ireland) Mark Allen**	**4**
(China) Si Jiahui	1
**(England) Robbie Williams**	**4**
(England) Adam Duffy	2
(Wales) Ryan Day	1
**(Scotland) John Higgins**	**4**
**(England) Matthew Selt**	**4**
(Wales) Duane Jones	1

**Last 16**; Best of 7 frames
(England) Robert Milkins	0
**(England) Gary Wilson**	**4**
**(Scotland) Anthony McGill**	**4**
(England) Ricky Walden	3
**(Northern Ireland) Mark Allen**	**4**
(England) Robbie Williams	0
**(Scotland) John Higgins**	**4**
(England) Matthew Selt	3

**Quarter-finals**; Best of 9 frames
**(England) Gary Wilson**	**5**
(Scotland) Anthony McGill	0
(Northern Ireland) Mark Allen	2
**(Scotland) John Higgins**	**5**

**Semi-finals**; Best of 11 frames
**(England) Gary Wilson**	**6**
(Scotland) John Higgins	4

=== Bottom half ===
**Last 64**; Best of 7 frames
Alfie Davies (WAL) (Note: Alfie Davies replaced Ronnie O'Sullivan, who withdrew.)	3
**Dominic Dale (WAL)**	**4**
Jordan Brown (NIR)	3
**Stan Moody (ENG)**	**4**
Zhang Anda (CHN) (14)	1
**Jak Jones (WAL)**	**4**
**Hossein Vafaei (IRN) (19)**	**4**
Julien Leclercq (BEL)	1
Noppon Saengkham (THA) (22)	2
**Dylan Emery (WAL)**	**4**
**Elliot Slessor (ENG)**	**w/o**
Andrew Higginson (ENG)	w/d
**Fan Zhengyi (CHN)**	**4**
Ben Mertens (BEL)	2
Mark Selby (ENG) (6)	2
**Aaron Hill (IRL)**	**4**
Barry Pinches (ENG) (Note: Barry Pinches replaced David Grace, who withdrew.)	1
**Daniel Wells (WAL)**	**4**
**Marco Fu (HKG)**	**4**
Zak Surety (ENG)	3
Kyren Wilson (ENG) (10)	1
**Anthony Hamilton (ENG)**	**4**
Chris Wakelin (ENG) (23)	1
**Martin O'Donnell (ENG)**	**4**
**Tom Ford (ENG) (18)**	**4**
Ian Burns (ENG)	2
**Barry Hawkins (ENG) (15)**	**4**
Xiao Guodong (CHN)	3
**Graeme Dott (SCO)**	**4**
Wu Yize (CHN)	2
**Luca Brecel (BEL) (2)**	**4**
Joe O'Connor (ENG)	0

**Last 32**; Best of 7 frames
**(Wales) Dominic Dale**	**4**
(England) Stan Moody	1
**(Wales) Jak Jones**	**4**
(Iran) Hossein Vafaei	2
(Wales) Dylan Emery	1
**(England) Elliot Slessor**	**4**
**(China) Fan Zhengyi**	**4**
(Republic of Ireland) Aaron Hill	1
(Wales) Daniel Wells	2
**(Hong Kong) Marco Fu**	**4**
(England) Anthony Hamilton	2
**(England) Martin O'Donnell**	**4**
**(England) Tom Ford**	**4**
(England) Barry Hawkins	1
(Scotland) Graeme Dott	1
**(Belgium) Luca Brecel**	**4**

**Last 16**; Best of 7 frames
**(Wales) Dominic Dale**	**4**
(Wales) Jak Jones	0
**(England) Elliot Slessor**	**4**
(China) Fan Zhengyi	3
(Hong Kong) Marco Fu	2
**(England) Martin O'Donnell**	**4**
(England) Tom Ford	1
**(Belgium) Luca Brecel**	**4**

**Quarter-finals**; Best of 9 frames
(Wales) Dominic Dale	3
**(England) Elliot Slessor**	**5**
**(England) Martin O'Donnell**	**5**
(Belgium) Luca Brecel	3

**Semi-finals**; Best of 11 frames
(England) Elliot Slessor	5
**(England) Martin O'Donnell**	**6**

Note: w/o = walkover; w/d = withdrawn

=== Final: frame scores ===
Final: Best of 17 frames. Referee: Leo Scullion; Venue Cymru, Llandudno, Wales, 18 February 2024
**Gary Wilson** (17); England	**9**–4	Martin O'Donnell; England
Afternoon: **98**–1, **74**–44, **102**–0, **106**–5, 23–**73**, **67**–4, **59**–45, 1–**92**; Evening: 24–**59**, **101**–19 (100), 22–**101**, **68**–44, **82**–0
(frame 10) **100**	Highest break	92 (frame 8)
**1**	Century breaks	0

== Qualifying ==
Qualification for the tournament took place from 25 to 27 January at the Barnsley Metrodome in Barnsley, England. Matches involving the top 16 players in the world rankings and two Welsh wildcards (Riley Powell and Liam Davies) were held over and played at the final venue. Numbers in parentheses after the players' names denote the top 32 seeded players, and players in bold denote match winners.

=== Llandudno ===
The results of the held-over matches played in Llandudno on 12 February were as follows:

- **Robert Milkins** (ENG) (1) **4**–3 Jamie Jones (WAL)
- **Jack Lisowski** (ENG) (16) **4**–2 Oliver Brown (ENG)
- **Ding Junhui** (CHN) (12) **4**–2 Jenson Kendrick (ENG)
- **Zhang Anda** (CHN) (14) **4**–1 Ahmed Aly Elsayed (USA)
- **Neil Robertson** (AUS) (8) **4**–1 Jackson Page (WAL)
- Liam Graham (SCO) 1–**4** **Alfie Davies** (WAL)
- Shaun Murphy (ENG) (7) 3–**4** **Barry Pinches** (ENG)
- Riley Powell (WAL) 0–**4** **Liam Davies** (WAL)
- **Mark Williams** (WAL) (9) **4**–2 John Astley (ENG)
- **Mark Allen** (NIR) (5) **4**–3 Cao Yupeng (CHN)
- **Barry Hawkins** (ENG) (15) **4**–0 He Guoqiang (CHN)
- **John Higgins** (SCO) (13) **4**–0 Mohamed Ibrahim (EGY)
- **Kyren Wilson** (ENG) (10) **4**–3 Ashley Carty (ENG)
- **Luca Brecel** (BEL) (2) **4**–3 Jiang Jun (CHN)
- Liam Highfield (ENG) 2–**4** **Duane Jones** (WAL)
- Ali Carter (ENG) (11) 1–**4** **Elliot Slessor** (ENG)
- **Mark Selby** (ENG) (6) **4**–2 Yuan Sijun (CHN)

The result of the one held-over match played on 13 February was as follows:

- Alexander Ursenbacher (SUI) 0–**4** **Liam Davies** (WAL)

=== Barnsley ===
The results of the qualifying matches played in Barnsley were as follows:

- **Anthony McGill** (SCO) (24) **4**–1 M. Phetmalaikul (THA)
- **Si Jiahui** (CHN) (28) **4**–2 Stephen Maguire (SCO)
- Mink Nutcharut (THA) 2–**4** **Andrew Pagett** (WAL)
- **Daniel Wells** (WAL) **4**–2 Thepchaiya Un-Nooh (THA)
- **Gary Wilson** (ENG) (17) **4**–1 Mark Davis (ENG)
- Stephen Hendry (SCO) 2–**4** **Ross Muir** (SCO)
- Andres Petrov (EST) 0–**4** **Anthony Hamilton** (ENG)
- Pang Junxu (CHN) (31) 3–**4** **Graeme Dott** (SCO)
- **Allan Taylor** (ENG) **4**–2 Haydon Pinhey (ENG) (Note: Haydon Pinhey replaced Dean Young, who withdrew.)
- **Hossein Vafaei** (IRN) (19) **4**–1 Scott Donaldson (SCO)
- **Julien Leclercq** (BEL) **4**–3 Alfie Burden (ENG)
- **Chris Wakelin** (ENG) (23) **4**–0 Jimmy Robertson (ENG)
- **Matthew Stevens** (WAL) **4**–3 Louis Heathcote (ENG)
- **Tian Pengfei** (CHN) **4**–0 Rod Lawler (ENG)
- Hammad Miah (ENG) 0–**4** **Ben Mertens** (BEL)
- **Ian Burns** (ENG) **4**–2 Lukas Kleckers (GER)
- **Long Zehuang** (CHN) **4**–1 Andy Lee (HKG)
- Baipat Siripaporn (THA) 0–**4** **Sanderson Lam** (ENG)
- Peng Yisong (CHN) 0–**4** **Robbie Williams** (ENG)
- Lyu Haotian (CHN) (30) 3–**4** **Jordan Brown** (NIR)
- Zhou Yuelong (CHN) (21) 0–**4** **Adam Duffy** (ENG)
- **Noppon Saengkham** (THA) (22) **4**–1 Himanshu Jain (IND)
- Stuart Bingham (ENG) (26) 1–**4** **Marco Fu** (HKG)
- **Xiao Guodong** (CHN) **4**–3 Ashley Hugill (ENG)
- Michael White (WAL) 3–**4** **Oliver Lines** (ENG)
- **Liam Pullen** (ENG) **4**–0 Rebecca Kenna (ENG)
- **Matthew Selt** (ENG) (29) **4**–3 Sam Craigie (ENG)
- **Aaron Hill** (IRL) **4**–0 Anton Kazakov (UKR)
- **Ricky Walden** (ENG) (25) **4**–2 Andy Hicks (ENG)
- Reanne Evans (ENG) 2–**4** **Stuart Carrington** (ENG)
- **Ryan Day** (WAL) (20) **4**–3 Mostafa Dorgham (EGY)
- **Stan Moody** (ENG) **4**–2 Sean O'Sullivan (ENG)
- Rory Thor (MAS) 2–**4** **Ma Hailong** (CHN)
- **Jak Jones** (WAL) **4**–3 Liu Hongyu (CHN)
- **Andrew Higginson** (ENG) **4**–2 Xing Zihao (CHN)
- Joe Perry (ENG) (27) 2–**4** **Fan Zhengyi** (CHN)
- Ishpreet Singh Chadha (IND) 0–**4** **Iulian Boiko** (UKR)
- **Dominic Dale** (WAL) **4**–1 Jimmy White (ENG)
- **Wu Yize** (CHN) **4**–1 Sydney Wilson (ENG) (Note: Sydney Wilson replaced Martin Gould, who withdrew.)
- **Joe O'Connor** (ENG) **4**–3 Xu Si (CHN)
- James Cahill (ENG) 3–**4** **Jamie Clarke** (WAL)
- **David Lilley** (ENG) **4**–0 Victor Sarkis (BRA)
- Ryan Thomerson (AUS) 3–**4** **Martin O'Donnell** (ENG)
- **Tom Ford** (ENG) (18) **4**–3 Ben Woollaston (ENG)
- **David Gilbert** (ENG) (32) **4**–0 Ken Doherty (IRL)
- **Dylan Emery** (WAL) **4**–1 Fergal O'Brien (IRL)
- **Zak Surety** (ENG) **4**–2 Mark Joyce (ENG)

== Century breaks ==
=== Main stage centuries ===
A total of 52 century breaks were made during the main stage of the tournament.

- 147, 120, 105, 104, 100 – Gary Wilson
- 142, 102 – Barry Hawkins
- 141, 110, 110, 101 – Mark Allen
- 140 – Robert Milkins
- 139, 103 – Neil Robertson
- 138 – Ricky Walden
- 136 – Jamie Jones
- 135 – Matthew Selt
- 134 – Xiao Guodong
- 133 – Anthony Hamilton
- 131, 124, 118 – John Higgins
- 130, 126, 113, 110 – Martin O'Donnell
- 130 – Fan Zhengyi
- 129, 128, 101 – Elliot Slessor
- 128 – Shaun Murphy
- 125, 103 – Alfie Davies
- 122, 113 – Marco Fu
- 122 – Dominic Dale
- 121 – Dylan Emery
- 119, 101 – Luca Brecel
- 119 – Liam Davies
- 119 – Robbie Williams
- 117 – Mark Williams
- 116 – Hossein Vafaei
- 113, 113 – Jack Lisowski
- 112 – Tom Ford
- 111 – Kyren Wilson
- 105 – Graeme Dott
- 105 – Anthony McGill
- 103 – Duane Jones
- 103 – Stan Moody
- 101 – Jiang Jun

=== Qualifying stage centuries ===
A total of 14 century breaks were made during the qualifying stage of the tournament.

- 146 – Robbie Williams
- 137, 120 – Matthew Stevens
- 136 – David Gilbert
- 123, 103 – Dylan Emery
- 118 – Ian Burns
- 118 – James Cahill
- 118 – Ashley Hugill
- 111 – Oliver Lines
- 107 – Ma Hailong
- 103 – Pang Junxu
- 103 – Hossein Vafaei
- 101 – Iulian Boiko
