= Olivier Marteel =

Belgian snooker referee

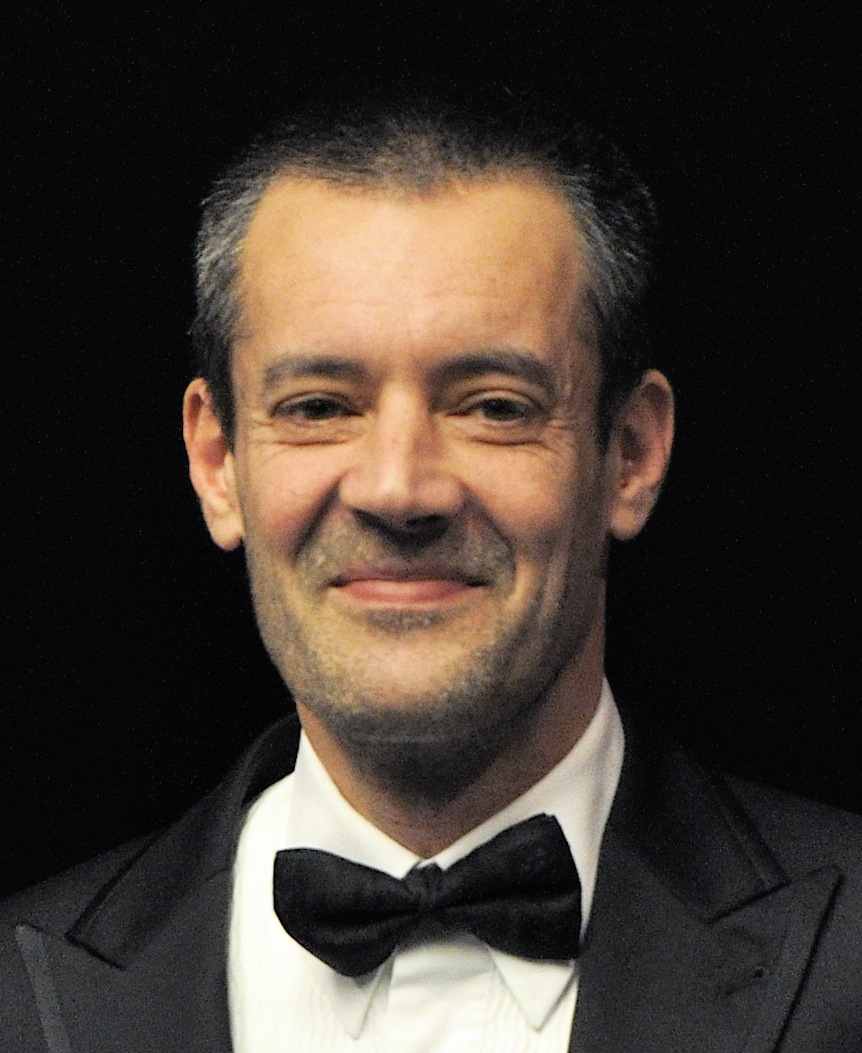
- Olivier Marteel in 2013

Personal information
- Born: 10 May 1969 (age 57) Nieuwpoort, Flanders, Belgium

Sport
- Country: Belgium
- Sport: Snooker
- Professional: 2006–present

Olivier Marteel (born 10 May 1969) is a Belgian professional snooker referee who officiates on the World Snooker Tour.

== Career ==
Born in Nieuwpoort, Marteel now lives in Gijverinkhove. He first qualified as a referee in 1994, and began refereeing on the main professional tour in 2006. He took charge of his first World Snooker Championship final in 2015, becoming the first Belgian to referee a world final, and the second referee from continental Europe to do so, after Jan Verhaas. Marteel refereed his second world final in 2022. In addition to the World Championships, Marteel has officiated the Masters final three times, in 2016, 2018, and 2025, and the UK Championship final three times, in 2016, 2020, and 2025. He also plays snooker, and has achieved highest breaks of 133 in practice and 78 in competition.

Marteel is a qualified nurse and has been nursing since his twenty-first birthday. He worked in the frontline as a nurse in Belgium during the COVID-19 pandemic, despite being trained as a radiologist.

In the 2023 World Snooker Championship, he prevented a Just Stop Oil protester from gluing herself to the table; this occurred moments after another protester had covered the opposite table in orange powder. The match overseen by Marteel resumed shortly after the interruption, while the other match was delayed to the next day.
