= 2019 Champion of Champions =

Snooker tournament

2019 ManBetX Champion of Champions
Tournament information
- Dates: 4–10 November 2019
- Venue: Ricoh Arena
- City: Coventry
- Country: England
- Organisation: Matchroom Sport
- Format: Non-ranking event
- Total prize fund: £440,000
- Winner's share: £150,000
- Highest break: Mark Allen (NIR) (140)

Final
- Champion: Neil Robertson (AUS)
- Runner-up: Judd Trump (ENG)
- Score: 10–9

The 2019 Champion of Champions (officially the 2019 ManBetX Champion of Champions) was a professional snooker tournament that took place between 4 and 10 November 2019 at the Ricoh Arena in Coventry, England. It was the ninth Champion of Champions event, the first of which was held in 1978. The tournament featured 16 participants who had won events on the World Snooker Tour since the 2018 Champion of Champions, including the winner of the Women's World Championship, competing in the tournament for the first time. As an invitational event, the tournament carried no world ranking points. The tournament was also the last featuring Clive Everton in commentary for ITV4, as the COVID-19 pandemic prevented him from returning to commentary duties for future events in the season and subsequent seasons, having been suffering from Parkinson's disease for some time.

Ronnie O'Sullivan was the defending champion, having defeated Kyren Wilson 10–9 in the final of the 2018 event. O'Sullivan lost 5–6 to Neil Robertson in the semi-finals. Robertson defeated reigning world champion Judd Trump 10–9 in the final to win the championship, having required a snooker in the penultimate frame to avoid losing the match. The tournament produced 20 century breaks. The final set a new record for the most centuries in a best-of-19-frames match as Robertson made five centuries and Trump three, for a total of eight. Mark Allen compiled the highest break of the tournament, a 140, in his semi-final loss to Trump. The tournament's total prize fund was £440,000, of which the winner received £150,000.

== Format ==
The Champion of Champions is an invitational snooker tournament, first held in 1978, and staged annually since 2013. As an invitational event, it does not carry any world ranking points. The 2019 Champion of Champions took place from 4 to 10 November 2019 at the Ricoh Arena in Coventry, England. It featured 16 winners of events from the previous 12 months on the World Snooker Tour. The World Women's Snooker Championship and the World Seniors Championship were added to the list of eligible events for 2019, the winners of these two championships being allowed to participate in the Champion of Champions for the first and second time, respectively (Steve Davis as reigning World Seniors Champion had qualified for the 2014 Champion of Champions). The tournament was organised by Matchroom Sport, broadcast on ITV4 and sponsored by sports betting company ManbetX.

The 16 qualifiers were split into four groups of four players; each group competed on a different day, with the group finals (event quarter-finals) played on the same day as the corresponding first-round matches. The two semi-finals were played on separate days—8 and 9 November—with the final on 10 November. Opening round matches were played as the best of 7 frames, while the group finals and semi-finals were the best of 11 frames, and the two-session final was played as a best-of-19-frames match. Ronnie O'Sullivan automatically qualified for the event as defending champion, having defeated Kyren Wilson 10–9 in the 2018 Champion of Champions final.

=== Prize fund ===
The event featured a prize fund of £440,000, an increase of £70,000 over the 2018 Champion of Champions tournament. Most of the increase went to the winner: the winner's prize was increased by £50,000, to £150,000. The breakdown of prize money for the 2019 event was:

- Winner: £150,000
- Runner-up: £60,000
- Semi-final: £30,000
- Group runner-up: £17,500
- First round loser: £12,500
- Total: £440,000

=== Qualification ===
Qualification for the 2019 Champion of Champions event was determined by the winners of 26 tournaments over a one-year period, from the 2018 Champion of Champions to the 2019 World Open, thereby including tournaments from both the 2018–19 and 2019–20 snooker seasons. The tournaments were placed into six groups dependent on the size of the event, with the previous year's Champion of Champions and the Triple Crown events listed in the first group, and tournaments in the same group listed chronologically. The winners of the first 16 tournaments on the list were guaranteed a place in the championship. In the event of any of these players meeting multiple qualification criteria, the winners of subsequent tournaments on the list (in the order shown below) would be offered a place. Judd Trump qualified by winning six of the first 16 tournaments, the most won by any player.

Tournament	Date of tournament final	Winner
2018 Champion of Champions	11 November 2018	Ronnie O'Sullivan (ENG)
2018 UK Championship	9 December 2018	Ronnie O'Sullivan (ENG)
2019 Masters	20 January 2019	Judd Trump (ENG)
2019 German Masters	3 February 2019	Kyren Wilson (ENG)
2019 World Grand Prix	10 February 2019	Judd Trump (ENG)
2019 Indian Open	3 March 2019	Matthew Selt (ENG)
2019 Players Championship	10 March 2019	Ronnie O'Sullivan (ENG)
2019 Championship League	14 March 2019	Martin Gould (ENG)
2019 Tour Championship	24 March 2019	Ronnie O'Sullivan (ENG)
2019 China Open	7 April 2019	Neil Robertson (AUS)
2019 International Championship	11 August 2019	Judd Trump (ENG)
2019 Shanghai Masters	15 September 2019	Ronnie O'Sullivan (ENG)
2019 China Championship	29 September 2019	Shaun Murphy (ENG)
2019 World Open	3 November 2019	Judd Trump (ENG)
2018 Northern Ireland Open	18 November 2018	Judd Trump (ENG)
2018 Scottish Open	16 December 2018	Mark Allen (NIR)
2019 Welsh Open	17 February 2019	Neil Robertson (AUS)
2019 English Open	20 October 2019	Mark Selby (ENG)
2019 Gibraltar Open	17 March 2019	Stuart Bingham (ENG)
2019 World Championship (runner-up)	6 May 2019	John Higgins (SCO)
2019 Riga Masters	28 July 2019	Yan Bingtao (CHN)
2019 World Cup	30 June 2019	John Higgins (SCO)
2019 World Cup	30 June 2019	Stephen Maguire (SCO)
2019 Shoot Out	24 February 2019	Thepchaiya Un-Nooh (THA)
2019 Six-red World Championship	7 September 2019	Stephen Maguire (SCO)
2019 World Women's Championship	23 June 2019	Reanne Evans (ENG)
2019 World Seniors Championship	18 August 2019	Jimmy White (ENG)

Player had already qualified by winning a previous event

== Summary ==
The event featured 16 participants, split into four groups of four players. There were eight seeded players, based on the world snooker rankings, and each of the top four seeds was placed into a separate group. As defending champion, Ronnie O'Sullivan was seeded first, world champion Judd Trump second, Mark Selby third and Neil Robertson fourth. Each group was played over the course of a single day as single-elimination, rather than a round-robin competition.

=== Group stages ===
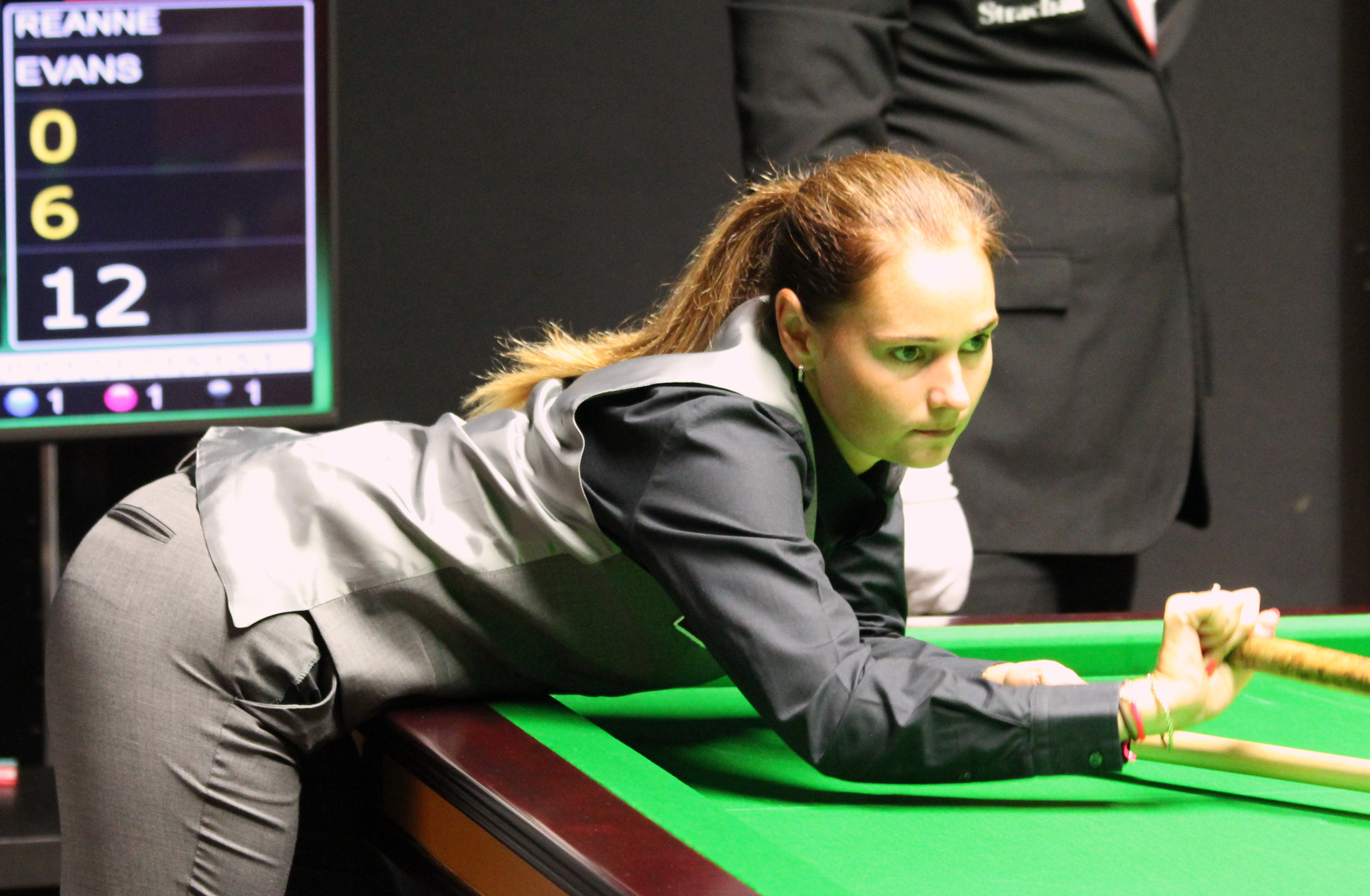
Reanne Evans was the first woman to play at the event.

The championship began on 4 November 2019, with players from group four competing in the first round. The opening match was between Neil Robertson and 2019 Championship League winner Martin Gould. Robertson defeated Gould 4–0, the highest break of the match being just 67. In the other group four match, 2019 China Championship winner Shaun Murphy played Reanne Evans, the 2019 World Women's Snooker champion. Speaking to the press before the match, Evans reflected that whilst it was an honour to play in the competition despite not being on the World Snooker Tour, there was still a disparity between the men's and women's games. She also commented that the prize money for appearing at the event was double that of any she had received before, despite having won the World Women's Championship on 12 occasions.

Murphy developed an early lead by winning the first three frames of the match, before Evans took the next three to force a deciding frame. She went in-off whilst playing a safety shot in the final frame, allowing Murphy to make a break of 130 and win the match 4–3. Murphy praised Evans afterwards, saying that he really hoped "we see more of Reanne on the main event". He also remarked later that the audience was supporting Evans and even his wife was "reluctant to wish [him] good luck today". Murphy and Robertson competed in the group four final. Murphy again took the first three frames of the match, before Robertson drew level at 3–3 after a break of 100 and two breaks of 90 plus. The two players shared the next four frames, both experiencing issues with the table running off, to tie the match at 5–5. Robertson took the deciding frame to win 6–5.

In the group three matches, played on 5 November, three-time world champion Mark Selby defeated first-time ranking event winner Yan Bingtao 4–0. The 2018 Scottish Open winner Mark Allen defeated the 2019 Indian Open winner Matthew Selt. In the group three final, Allen recovered from 1–2 behind to defeat Selby 6–2. The group two matches, played on 6 November, featured a first-round encounter between the reigning world champion Judd Trump and the six-red and World Cup winner Stephen Maguire. Trump won the first two frames, Maguire scoring just four points. Trump also took frames three and four, making three breaks of over 50, to win the match 4–0. The 2019 Snooker Shoot Out winner Thepchaiya Un-Nooh played Kyren Wilson in the other group two first-round match. Un-Nooh won three of the first four frames, with breaks of 63, 51 and 90, before Wilson made breaks of 102 and 98 to force a deciding frame. Un-Nooh won the match 4–3 to progress to the group two final against Trump, which was a rematch of the 2019 World Open final, held the previous week. Trump won the first four frames of the match, scoring two centuries; Un-Nooh won frame five but Trump then pulled ahead to 5–1. After Un-Nooh replied with breaks of 61 and 66, Trump took the ninth frame to win the match 6–3.

The group one matches took place on 7 November. World number three Ronnie O'Sullivan played 2019 World Seniors Championship winner Jimmy White in the first match. White took the first three frames, before O'Sullivan won the next two. During frame six, White suffered a kick at a crucial point where he could have won the match, allowing O'Sullivan to force a deciding frame, which he won. Two former world champions, John Higgins and Stuart Bingham, met in the other group one first-round match, which Higgins won 4–2. O'Sullivan defeated Higgins 6–3 in the group one final. O'Sullivan's average shot time during the match was just 13 seconds per shot.

=== Knockout stages ===
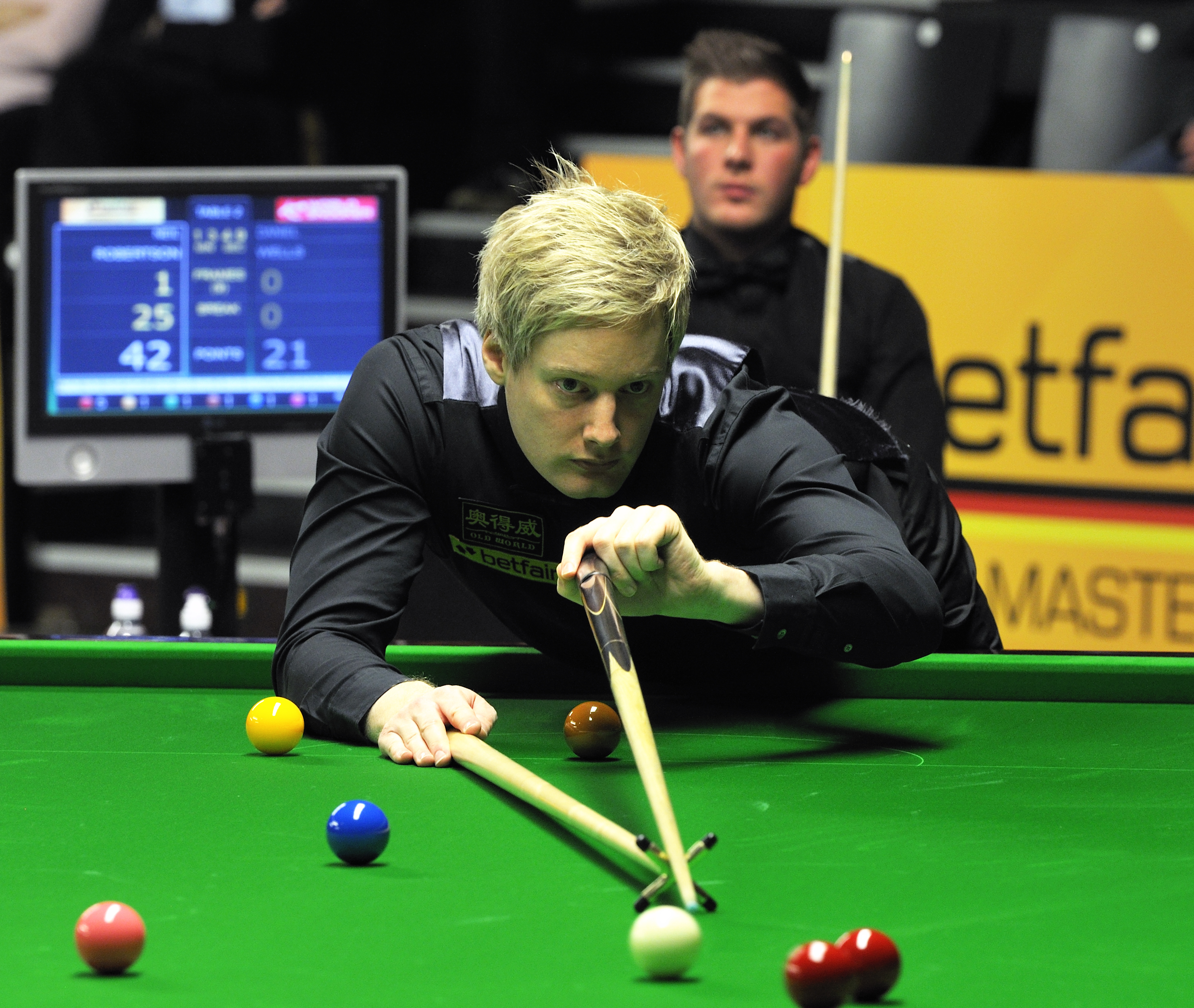
Neil Robertson won the event, defeating Judd Trump 10–9 in the final.

The semi-finals were played as the best of 11 frames. The first semi-final was held on 8 November between Ronnie O'Sullivan and Neil Robertson. The pair had met in the finals of two events in the 2019 Coral Cup series—the Tour Championship and the Players Championship—with O'Sullivan winning on both occasions. The match was even throughout, with no more than one frame separating the two players. Robertson compiled a break of 108 in frame five to open up a 3–2 lead, but O'Sullivan won three of the next four frames to lead 5–4. Robertson won frame 10 with a break of 135, the highest of the tournament at that point, to force a deciding frame. O'Sullivan gained the first chance of the final frame, but miscued whilst playing the black ball, allowing Robertson to make a break of 90 to win the match 6–5. Robertson later commented that the match was "definitely one of the best matches [he had] been involved in".

Mark Allen and Judd Trump met in the second semi-final on 9 November. Trump won the first three frames of the match, but Allen took the next four, including the tournament's highest break of 140, to lead 4–3. Trump made a break of 86 to tie the match, and then clinched frame nine after a fluke when potting a red ball. With a break of 98 in frame 10, Trump won the match 6–4.

The final between Trump and Robertson was played as a best-of-19-frames match over two sessions on 10 November. The referee for the final was Desislava Bozhilova. Robertson won the first two frames, including a break of 112 in the second frame, and took an early 3–1 lead. Trump then made three consecutive centuries in frames five to seven, totalling 367 points without reply, to go ahead 4–3. Breaks of 96 and 111 gave Robertson the next two frames to retake the lead at 5–4 after the first session.

Trump took the first frame of the second session, but Robertson replied with a break of 104. Trump won the next two frames to go 7–6 ahead, and retained the lead until Robertson made a break of 135 in the 16th frame to tie the match at 8–8. Trump required a snooker in frame 17, but he secured the required penalty points and went 9–8 ahead. Robertson required a snooker in frame 18 to avoid losing the match; he succeeded in forcing a re-spotted black, which he potted to draw level at 9–9. He then made a break of 137 in the deciding frame to win the match 10–9. This was Robertson's second Champion of Champions victory, having won the event in 2015. He later commented: "I can't believe the pair of us playing a match like that. It's the best match I've ever been involved in". With a total of eight century breaks (five of which were compiled by Robertson), the final set a new record for the most centuries in a best-of-19-frames match. There were 784,000 viewers on ITV4 across the two sessions of the final. This was the second-highest non-terrestrial viewing figure in the United Kingdom for the day, behind a Premier League football match between Liverpool F.C. and Manchester City F.C. on Sky Sports.

== Main draw ==
Below is the main draw for the event. Numbers in brackets show the four seeded players. Players in bold denote match winners.

**Group semi-finals (last 16)**; Best of 7 frames
(England) **Ronnie O'Sullivan (1)**	**4**
(England) Jimmy White	3
**Group 1** (7 November)
(Scotland) **John Higgins**	**4**
(England) Stuart Bingham	2
(Australia) **Neil Robertson (4)**	**4**
(England) Martin Gould	0
**Group 4** (4 November)
(England) **Shaun Murphy**	**4**
(England) Reanne Evans	3
(England) **Mark Selby (3)**	**4**
(China) Yan Bingtao	0
**Group 3** (5 November)
(Northern Ireland) **Mark Allen**	**4**
(England) Matthew Selt	2
(England) **Judd Trump (2)**	**4**
(Scotland) Stephen Maguire	0
**Group 2** (6 November)
(England) Kyren Wilson	3
(Thailand) **Thepchaiya Un-Nooh**	**4**

**Group finals (quarter-finals)**; Best of 11 frames
(England) **Ronnie O'Sullivan (1)**	**6**
(Scotland) John Higgins	3
**(Australia) Neil Robertson (4)**	**6**
(England) Shaun Murphy	5
(England) Mark Selby (3)	2
(Northern Ireland) **Mark Allen**	**6**
(England) **Judd Trump (2)**	**6**
(Thailand) Thepchaiya Un-Nooh	3

**Semi-finals**; Best of 11 frames
(England) Ronnie O'Sullivan (1)	5
(Australia) **Neil Robertson (4)**	**6**
(Northern Ireland) Mark Allen	4
(England) **Judd Trump (2)**	**6**

**Final**; Best of 19 frames
**(Australia) Neil Robertson (4)**	**10**
(England) Judd Trump (2)	9

=== Final ===
Final: Best of 19 frames. Referee: Desislava Bozhilova; Ricoh Arena, Coventry, England, 10 November 2019
**Neil Robertson** (4); Australia	**10**–9	Judd Trump (2); England
Afternoon: **69**–47, **112**–0 (112), 8–**86** (86), **71**–50 (56), 0–**121** (121), 0–**127** (127), 0–**119** (119), **96**–0 (96), **124**–0 (111); Evening: 36–**75**, **104**–0 (104), 58–**70**, 7–**84** (84), **91**–36 (81), 41–**75** (62), **135**–0 (135), 60–**62**, **76**–69 (Trump 69), (Note: Robertson won the frame on a re-spotted black.) **137**–0 (137)
**137**	Highest break	127
**5**	Century breaks	3
**8**	50+ breaks	7

== Century breaks ==
A total of 20 century breaks were made during the competition. Mark Allen made the highest break of the tournament, a 140 in frame five in his semi-final match against Judd Trump.

- 140, 108, 106 – Mark Allen
- 137, 135, 135, 112, 111, 108, 104, 100 – Neil Robertson
- 130 – Shaun Murphy
- 128, 127, 121, 119, 114, 102 – Judd Trump
- 104 – Ronnie O'Sullivan
- 102 – Kyren Wilson
