= 2018 Champion of Champions =

2018 ManBetX Champion of Champions
Tournament information
- Dates: 5–11 November 2018
- Venue: Ricoh Arena
- City: Coventry
- Country: England
- Organisation: Matchroom Sport
- Format: Non-ranking event
- Total prize fund: £370,000
- Winner's share: £100,000
- Highest break: Mark Selby (ENG) (147)

Final
- Champion: Ronnie O'Sullivan (ENG)
- Runner-up: Kyren Wilson (ENG)
- Score: 10–9

The 2018 Champion of Champions (officially the 2018 ManBetX Champion of Champions) was a professional non-ranking snooker tournament which took place from 5 to 11 November 2018 at the Ricoh Arena in Coventry, England.

Shaun Murphy was the defending champion, but lost 3–6 in the semi-finals to Ronnie O'Sullivan in a repeat of the final of the previous edition of the tournament.

Ronnie O'Sullivan defeated Kyren Wilson 10–9 in the final to capture his third Champion of Champions title.

== Prize fund ==
The breakdown of prize money for 2018 is shown below:

- Winner: £100,000
- Runner-up: £50,000
- Losing semi-finalist: £25,000
- Group runner-up: £17,500
- First round losers: £12,500
- Total: £370,000

== Qualification ==
Qualification for the 2018 Champion of Champions tournament was determined by the winners of (at most) 26 tournaments over one year, from the 2017 Champion of Champions to the 2018 International Championship, thereby including tournaments from both the 2017/2018 and 2018/2019 snooker seasons. The winners of the first 16 tournaments on the list were guaranteed qualification. The winners of the next tournaments on the list – in the order shown in the table – would also take a place in the Champion of Champions if other players win more than one of the tournaments higher on the list.

In case less than 16 different tournament winners qualified, the remaining spots would be awarded based on the world rankings after the 2018 English Open.

Tournament	Date of tournament final	Winner	Qualified players	Date qualification confirmed
2017 Champion of Champions	12 November 2017	(England) Shaun Murphy	(England) Shaun Murphy (England) Ronnie O'Sullivan (Northern Ireland) Mark Allen (Wales) Mark Williams (Scotland) John Higgins (England) Mark Selby (England) Jimmy Robertson (Australia) Neil Robertson (England) Stuart Bingham (Wales) Ryan Day (England) Kyren Wilson (Cyprus) Michael Georgiou (England) Judd Trump (China) Ding Junhui (England) Barry Hawkins (Belgium) Luca Brecel	12 November 2017; 18 November 2017; 21 January 2018; 10 December 2017; 4 March 2018; 8 April 2018; 7 October 2018; 25 February 2018; 21 October 2018; 29 March 2018; 26 August 2018; 12 August 2018; 7 October 2018; 21 October 2018; 21 October 2018; 3 November 2018
2017 UK Championship	10 December 2017	(England) Ronnie O'Sullivan	(England) Shaun Murphy (England) Ronnie O'Sullivan (Northern Ireland) Mark Allen (Wales) Mark Williams (Scotland) John Higgins (England) Mark Selby (England) Jimmy Robertson (Australia) Neil Robertson (England) Stuart Bingham (Wales) Ryan Day (England) Kyren Wilson (Cyprus) Michael Georgiou (England) Judd Trump (China) Ding Junhui (England) Barry Hawkins (Belgium) Luca Brecel	12 November 2017; 18 November 2017; 21 January 2018; 10 December 2017; 4 March 2018; 8 April 2018; 7 October 2018; 25 February 2018; 21 October 2018; 29 March 2018; 26 August 2018; 12 August 2018; 7 October 2018; 21 October 2018; 21 October 2018; 3 November 2018
2018 Masters	21 January 2018	(Northern Ireland) Mark Allen	(England) Shaun Murphy (England) Ronnie O'Sullivan (Northern Ireland) Mark Allen (Wales) Mark Williams (Scotland) John Higgins (England) Mark Selby (England) Jimmy Robertson (Australia) Neil Robertson (England) Stuart Bingham (Wales) Ryan Day (England) Kyren Wilson (Cyprus) Michael Georgiou (England) Judd Trump (China) Ding Junhui (England) Barry Hawkins (Belgium) Luca Brecel	12 November 2017; 18 November 2017; 21 January 2018; 10 December 2017; 4 March 2018; 8 April 2018; 7 October 2018; 25 February 2018; 21 October 2018; 29 March 2018; 26 August 2018; 12 August 2018; 7 October 2018; 21 October 2018; 21 October 2018; 3 November 2018
2018 World Championship	7 May 2018	(Wales) Mark Williams	(England) Shaun Murphy (England) Ronnie O'Sullivan (Northern Ireland) Mark Allen (Wales) Mark Williams (Scotland) John Higgins (England) Mark Selby (England) Jimmy Robertson (Australia) Neil Robertson (England) Stuart Bingham (Wales) Ryan Day (England) Kyren Wilson (Cyprus) Michael Georgiou (England) Judd Trump (China) Ding Junhui (England) Barry Hawkins (Belgium) Luca Brecel	12 November 2017; 18 November 2017; 21 January 2018; 10 December 2017; 4 March 2018; 8 April 2018; 7 October 2018; 25 February 2018; 21 October 2018; 29 March 2018; 26 August 2018; 12 August 2018; 7 October 2018; 21 October 2018; 21 October 2018; 3 November 2018
2017 Shanghai Masters	18 November 2017	(England) Ronnie O'Sullivan	(England) Shaun Murphy (England) Ronnie O'Sullivan (Northern Ireland) Mark Allen (Wales) Mark Williams (Scotland) John Higgins (England) Mark Selby (England) Jimmy Robertson (Australia) Neil Robertson (England) Stuart Bingham (Wales) Ryan Day (England) Kyren Wilson (Cyprus) Michael Georgiou (England) Judd Trump (China) Ding Junhui (England) Barry Hawkins (Belgium) Luca Brecel	12 November 2017; 18 November 2017; 21 January 2018; 10 December 2017; 4 March 2018; 8 April 2018; 7 October 2018; 25 February 2018; 21 October 2018; 29 March 2018; 26 August 2018; 12 August 2018; 7 October 2018; 21 October 2018; 21 October 2018; 3 November 2018
2018 German Masters	4 February 2018	(Wales) Mark Williams	(England) Shaun Murphy (England) Ronnie O'Sullivan (Northern Ireland) Mark Allen (Wales) Mark Williams (Scotland) John Higgins (England) Mark Selby (England) Jimmy Robertson (Australia) Neil Robertson (England) Stuart Bingham (Wales) Ryan Day (England) Kyren Wilson (Cyprus) Michael Georgiou (England) Judd Trump (China) Ding Junhui (England) Barry Hawkins (Belgium) Luca Brecel	12 November 2017; 18 November 2017; 21 January 2018; 10 December 2017; 4 March 2018; 8 April 2018; 7 October 2018; 25 February 2018; 21 October 2018; 29 March 2018; 26 August 2018; 12 August 2018; 7 October 2018; 21 October 2018; 21 October 2018; 3 November 2018
2018 World Grand Prix	25 February 2018	(England) Ronnie O'Sullivan	(England) Shaun Murphy (England) Ronnie O'Sullivan (Northern Ireland) Mark Allen (Wales) Mark Williams (Scotland) John Higgins (England) Mark Selby (England) Jimmy Robertson (Australia) Neil Robertson (England) Stuart Bingham (Wales) Ryan Day (England) Kyren Wilson (Cyprus) Michael Georgiou (England) Judd Trump (China) Ding Junhui (England) Barry Hawkins (Belgium) Luca Brecel	12 November 2017; 18 November 2017; 21 January 2018; 10 December 2017; 4 March 2018; 8 April 2018; 7 October 2018; 25 February 2018; 21 October 2018; 29 March 2018; 26 August 2018; 12 August 2018; 7 October 2018; 21 October 2018; 21 October 2018; 3 November 2018
2018 Players Championship	25 March 2018	(England) Ronnie O'Sullivan	(England) Shaun Murphy (England) Ronnie O'Sullivan (Northern Ireland) Mark Allen (Wales) Mark Williams (Scotland) John Higgins (England) Mark Selby (England) Jimmy Robertson (Australia) Neil Robertson (England) Stuart Bingham (Wales) Ryan Day (England) Kyren Wilson (Cyprus) Michael Georgiou (England) Judd Trump (China) Ding Junhui (England) Barry Hawkins (Belgium) Luca Brecel	12 November 2017; 18 November 2017; 21 January 2018; 10 December 2017; 4 March 2018; 8 April 2018; 7 October 2018; 25 February 2018; 21 October 2018; 29 March 2018; 26 August 2018; 12 August 2018; 7 October 2018; 21 October 2018; 21 October 2018; 3 November 2018
2018 Championship League	29 March 2018	(Scotland) John Higgins	(England) Shaun Murphy (England) Ronnie O'Sullivan (Northern Ireland) Mark Allen (Wales) Mark Williams (Scotland) John Higgins (England) Mark Selby (England) Jimmy Robertson (Australia) Neil Robertson (England) Stuart Bingham (Wales) Ryan Day (England) Kyren Wilson (Cyprus) Michael Georgiou (England) Judd Trump (China) Ding Junhui (England) Barry Hawkins (Belgium) Luca Brecel	12 November 2017; 18 November 2017; 21 January 2018; 10 December 2017; 4 March 2018; 8 April 2018; 7 October 2018; 25 February 2018; 21 October 2018; 29 March 2018; 26 August 2018; 12 August 2018; 7 October 2018; 21 October 2018; 21 October 2018; 3 November 2018
2018 China Open	8 April 2018	(England) Mark Selby	(England) Shaun Murphy (England) Ronnie O'Sullivan (Northern Ireland) Mark Allen (Wales) Mark Williams (Scotland) John Higgins (England) Mark Selby (England) Jimmy Robertson (Australia) Neil Robertson (England) Stuart Bingham (Wales) Ryan Day (England) Kyren Wilson (Cyprus) Michael Georgiou (England) Judd Trump (China) Ding Junhui (England) Barry Hawkins (Belgium) Luca Brecel	12 November 2017; 18 November 2017; 21 January 2018; 10 December 2017; 4 March 2018; 8 April 2018; 7 October 2018; 25 February 2018; 21 October 2018; 29 March 2018; 26 August 2018; 12 August 2018; 7 October 2018; 21 October 2018; 21 October 2018; 3 November 2018
2018 World Open	12 August 2018	(Wales) Mark Williams	(England) Shaun Murphy (England) Ronnie O'Sullivan (Northern Ireland) Mark Allen (Wales) Mark Williams (Scotland) John Higgins (England) Mark Selby (England) Jimmy Robertson (Australia) Neil Robertson (England) Stuart Bingham (Wales) Ryan Day (England) Kyren Wilson (Cyprus) Michael Georgiou (England) Judd Trump (China) Ding Junhui (England) Barry Hawkins (Belgium) Luca Brecel	12 November 2017; 18 November 2017; 21 January 2018; 10 December 2017; 4 March 2018; 8 April 2018; 7 October 2018; 25 February 2018; 21 October 2018; 29 March 2018; 26 August 2018; 12 August 2018; 7 October 2018; 21 October 2018; 21 October 2018; 3 November 2018
2018 Shanghai Masters	16 September 2018	(England) Ronnie O'Sullivan	(England) Shaun Murphy (England) Ronnie O'Sullivan (Northern Ireland) Mark Allen (Wales) Mark Williams (Scotland) John Higgins (England) Mark Selby (England) Jimmy Robertson (Australia) Neil Robertson (England) Stuart Bingham (Wales) Ryan Day (England) Kyren Wilson (Cyprus) Michael Georgiou (England) Judd Trump (China) Ding Junhui (England) Barry Hawkins (Belgium) Luca Brecel	12 November 2017; 18 November 2017; 21 January 2018; 10 December 2017; 4 March 2018; 8 April 2018; 7 October 2018; 25 February 2018; 21 October 2018; 29 March 2018; 26 August 2018; 12 August 2018; 7 October 2018; 21 October 2018; 21 October 2018; 3 November 2018
2018 China Championship	30 September 2018	(England) Mark Selby	(England) Shaun Murphy (England) Ronnie O'Sullivan (Northern Ireland) Mark Allen (Wales) Mark Williams (Scotland) John Higgins (England) Mark Selby (England) Jimmy Robertson (Australia) Neil Robertson (England) Stuart Bingham (Wales) Ryan Day (England) Kyren Wilson (Cyprus) Michael Georgiou (England) Judd Trump (China) Ding Junhui (England) Barry Hawkins (Belgium) Luca Brecel	12 November 2017; 18 November 2017; 21 January 2018; 10 December 2017; 4 March 2018; 8 April 2018; 7 October 2018; 25 February 2018; 21 October 2018; 29 March 2018; 26 August 2018; 12 August 2018; 7 October 2018; 21 October 2018; 21 October 2018; 3 November 2018
2018 European Masters	7 October 2018	(England) Jimmy Robertson	(England) Shaun Murphy (England) Ronnie O'Sullivan (Northern Ireland) Mark Allen (Wales) Mark Williams (Scotland) John Higgins (England) Mark Selby (England) Jimmy Robertson (Australia) Neil Robertson (England) Stuart Bingham (Wales) Ryan Day (England) Kyren Wilson (Cyprus) Michael Georgiou (England) Judd Trump (China) Ding Junhui (England) Barry Hawkins (Belgium) Luca Brecel	12 November 2017; 18 November 2017; 21 January 2018; 10 December 2017; 4 March 2018; 8 April 2018; 7 October 2018; 25 February 2018; 21 October 2018; 29 March 2018; 26 August 2018; 12 August 2018; 7 October 2018; 21 October 2018; 21 October 2018; 3 November 2018
2018 International Championship	4 November 2018	(Northern Ireland) Mark Allen	(England) Shaun Murphy (England) Ronnie O'Sullivan (Northern Ireland) Mark Allen (Wales) Mark Williams (Scotland) John Higgins (England) Mark Selby (England) Jimmy Robertson (Australia) Neil Robertson (England) Stuart Bingham (Wales) Ryan Day (England) Kyren Wilson (Cyprus) Michael Georgiou (England) Judd Trump (China) Ding Junhui (England) Barry Hawkins (Belgium) Luca Brecel	12 November 2017; 18 November 2017; 21 January 2018; 10 December 2017; 4 March 2018; 8 April 2018; 7 October 2018; 25 February 2018; 21 October 2018; 29 March 2018; 26 August 2018; 12 August 2018; 7 October 2018; 21 October 2018; 21 October 2018; 3 November 2018
2017 Northern Ireland Open	26 November 2017	(Wales) Mark Williams	(England) Shaun Murphy (England) Ronnie O'Sullivan (Northern Ireland) Mark Allen (Wales) Mark Williams (Scotland) John Higgins (England) Mark Selby (England) Jimmy Robertson (Australia) Neil Robertson (England) Stuart Bingham (Wales) Ryan Day (England) Kyren Wilson (Cyprus) Michael Georgiou (England) Judd Trump (China) Ding Junhui (England) Barry Hawkins (Belgium) Luca Brecel	12 November 2017; 18 November 2017; 21 January 2018; 10 December 2017; 4 March 2018; 8 April 2018; 7 October 2018; 25 February 2018; 21 October 2018; 29 March 2018; 26 August 2018; 12 August 2018; 7 October 2018; 21 October 2018; 21 October 2018; 3 November 2018
2017 Scottish Open	17 December 2017	(Australia) Neil Robertson	(England) Shaun Murphy (England) Ronnie O'Sullivan (Northern Ireland) Mark Allen (Wales) Mark Williams (Scotland) John Higgins (England) Mark Selby (England) Jimmy Robertson (Australia) Neil Robertson (England) Stuart Bingham (Wales) Ryan Day (England) Kyren Wilson (Cyprus) Michael Georgiou (England) Judd Trump (China) Ding Junhui (England) Barry Hawkins (Belgium) Luca Brecel	12 November 2017; 18 November 2017; 21 January 2018; 10 December 2017; 4 March 2018; 8 April 2018; 7 October 2018; 25 February 2018; 21 October 2018; 29 March 2018; 26 August 2018; 12 August 2018; 7 October 2018; 21 October 2018; 21 October 2018; 3 November 2018
2018 Welsh Open	4 March 2018	(Scotland) John Higgins	(England) Shaun Murphy (England) Ronnie O'Sullivan (Northern Ireland) Mark Allen (Wales) Mark Williams (Scotland) John Higgins (England) Mark Selby (England) Jimmy Robertson (Australia) Neil Robertson (England) Stuart Bingham (Wales) Ryan Day (England) Kyren Wilson (Cyprus) Michael Georgiou (England) Judd Trump (China) Ding Junhui (England) Barry Hawkins (Belgium) Luca Brecel	12 November 2017; 18 November 2017; 21 January 2018; 10 December 2017; 4 March 2018; 8 April 2018; 7 October 2018; 25 February 2018; 21 October 2018; 29 March 2018; 26 August 2018; 12 August 2018; 7 October 2018; 21 October 2018; 21 October 2018; 3 November 2018
2018 English Open	21 October 2018	(England) Stuart Bingham	(England) Shaun Murphy (England) Ronnie O'Sullivan (Northern Ireland) Mark Allen (Wales) Mark Williams (Scotland) John Higgins (England) Mark Selby (England) Jimmy Robertson (Australia) Neil Robertson (England) Stuart Bingham (Wales) Ryan Day (England) Kyren Wilson (Cyprus) Michael Georgiou (England) Judd Trump (China) Ding Junhui (England) Barry Hawkins (Belgium) Luca Brecel	12 November 2017; 18 November 2017; 21 January 2018; 10 December 2017; 4 March 2018; 8 April 2018; 7 October 2018; 25 February 2018; 21 October 2018; 29 March 2018; 26 August 2018; 12 August 2018; 7 October 2018; 21 October 2018; 21 October 2018; 3 November 2018
2018 Gibraltar Open	11 March 2018	(Wales) Ryan Day	(England) Shaun Murphy (England) Ronnie O'Sullivan (Northern Ireland) Mark Allen (Wales) Mark Williams (Scotland) John Higgins (England) Mark Selby (England) Jimmy Robertson (Australia) Neil Robertson (England) Stuart Bingham (Wales) Ryan Day (England) Kyren Wilson (Cyprus) Michael Georgiou (England) Judd Trump (China) Ding Junhui (England) Barry Hawkins (Belgium) Luca Brecel	12 November 2017; 18 November 2017; 21 January 2018; 10 December 2017; 4 March 2018; 8 April 2018; 7 October 2018; 25 February 2018; 21 October 2018; 29 March 2018; 26 August 2018; 12 August 2018; 7 October 2018; 21 October 2018; 21 October 2018; 3 November 2018
2018 World Championship runner-up	7 May 2018	(Scotland) John Higgins	(England) Shaun Murphy (England) Ronnie O'Sullivan (Northern Ireland) Mark Allen (Wales) Mark Williams (Scotland) John Higgins (England) Mark Selby (England) Jimmy Robertson (Australia) Neil Robertson (England) Stuart Bingham (Wales) Ryan Day (England) Kyren Wilson (Cyprus) Michael Georgiou (England) Judd Trump (China) Ding Junhui (England) Barry Hawkins (Belgium) Luca Brecel	12 November 2017; 18 November 2017; 21 January 2018; 10 December 2017; 4 March 2018; 8 April 2018; 7 October 2018; 25 February 2018; 21 October 2018; 29 March 2018; 26 August 2018; 12 August 2018; 7 October 2018; 21 October 2018; 21 October 2018; 3 November 2018
2018 Riga Masters	29 July 2018	(Australia) Neil Robertson	(England) Shaun Murphy (England) Ronnie O'Sullivan (Northern Ireland) Mark Allen (Wales) Mark Williams (Scotland) John Higgins (England) Mark Selby (England) Jimmy Robertson (Australia) Neil Robertson (England) Stuart Bingham (Wales) Ryan Day (England) Kyren Wilson (Cyprus) Michael Georgiou (England) Judd Trump (China) Ding Junhui (England) Barry Hawkins (Belgium) Luca Brecel	12 November 2017; 18 November 2017; 21 January 2018; 10 December 2017; 4 March 2018; 8 April 2018; 7 October 2018; 25 February 2018; 21 October 2018; 29 March 2018; 26 August 2018; 12 August 2018; 7 October 2018; 21 October 2018; 21 October 2018; 3 November 2018
2018 Paul Hunter Classic	26 August 2018	(England) Kyren Wilson	(England) Shaun Murphy (England) Ronnie O'Sullivan (Northern Ireland) Mark Allen (Wales) Mark Williams (Scotland) John Higgins (England) Mark Selby (England) Jimmy Robertson (Australia) Neil Robertson (England) Stuart Bingham (Wales) Ryan Day (England) Kyren Wilson (Cyprus) Michael Georgiou (England) Judd Trump (China) Ding Junhui (England) Barry Hawkins (Belgium) Luca Brecel	12 November 2017; 18 November 2017; 21 January 2018; 10 December 2017; 4 March 2018; 8 April 2018; 7 October 2018; 25 February 2018; 21 October 2018; 29 March 2018; 26 August 2018; 12 August 2018; 7 October 2018; 21 October 2018; 21 October 2018; 3 November 2018
2018 Shoot Out	11 February 2018	(Cyprus) Michael Georgiou	(England) Shaun Murphy (England) Ronnie O'Sullivan (Northern Ireland) Mark Allen (Wales) Mark Williams (Scotland) John Higgins (England) Mark Selby (England) Jimmy Robertson (Australia) Neil Robertson (England) Stuart Bingham (Wales) Ryan Day (England) Kyren Wilson (Cyprus) Michael Georgiou (England) Judd Trump (China) Ding Junhui (England) Barry Hawkins (Belgium) Luca Brecel	12 November 2017; 18 November 2017; 21 January 2018; 10 December 2017; 4 March 2018; 8 April 2018; 7 October 2018; 25 February 2018; 21 October 2018; 29 March 2018; 26 August 2018; 12 August 2018; 7 October 2018; 21 October 2018; 21 October 2018; 3 November 2018
2018 Romanian Masters	18 March 2018	(Wales) Ryan Day	(England) Shaun Murphy (England) Ronnie O'Sullivan (Northern Ireland) Mark Allen (Wales) Mark Williams (Scotland) John Higgins (England) Mark Selby (England) Jimmy Robertson (Australia) Neil Robertson (England) Stuart Bingham (Wales) Ryan Day (England) Kyren Wilson (Cyprus) Michael Georgiou (England) Judd Trump (China) Ding Junhui (England) Barry Hawkins (Belgium) Luca Brecel	12 November 2017; 18 November 2017; 21 January 2018; 10 December 2017; 4 March 2018; 8 April 2018; 7 October 2018; 25 February 2018; 21 October 2018; 29 March 2018; 26 August 2018; 12 August 2018; 7 October 2018; 21 October 2018; 21 October 2018; 3 November 2018
2018 Six-red World Championship	8 September 2018	(England) Kyren Wilson	(England) Shaun Murphy (England) Ronnie O'Sullivan (Northern Ireland) Mark Allen (Wales) Mark Williams (Scotland) John Higgins (England) Mark Selby (England) Jimmy Robertson (Australia) Neil Robertson (England) Stuart Bingham (Wales) Ryan Day (England) Kyren Wilson (Cyprus) Michael Georgiou (England) Judd Trump (China) Ding Junhui (England) Barry Hawkins (Belgium) Luca Brecel	12 November 2017; 18 November 2017; 21 January 2018; 10 December 2017; 4 March 2018; 8 April 2018; 7 October 2018; 25 February 2018; 21 October 2018; 29 March 2018; 26 August 2018; 12 August 2018; 7 October 2018; 21 October 2018; 21 October 2018; 3 November 2018

== Main draw ==
Group semi-finals (last 16); Best of 7 frames
(England) Shaun Murphy (1)	4
(England) Jimmy Robertson	2
Group 1 (5 November)
(China) Ding Junhui (8)	4
(Cyprus) Michael Georgiou	2
(Scotland) John Higgins (5)	4
(Wales) Ryan Day	3
Group 4 (6 November)
(England) Ronnie O'Sullivan (4)	4
(England) Stuart Bingham	2
(Wales) Mark Williams (3)	1
(England) Kyren Wilson	4
Group 3 (7 November)
(England) Judd Trump (6)	4
(Belgium) Luca Brecel	1
(England) Barry Hawkins (7)	2
(Northern Ireland) Mark Allen	4
Group 2 (8 November)
(England) Mark Selby (2)	3
(Australia) Neil Robertson	4

Group finals (quarter-finals); Best of 11 frames
(England) Shaun Murphy (1)	6
(China) Ding Junhui (8)	3
(Scotland) John Higgins (5)	3
(England) Ronnie O'Sullivan (4)	6
(England) Kyren Wilson	6
(England) Judd Trump (6)	1
(Northern Ireland) Mark Allen	6
(Australia) Neil Robertson	1

Semi-finals; Best of 11 frames
(England) Shaun Murphy (1)	3
(England) Ronnie O'Sullivan (4)	6
(England) Kyren Wilson	6
(Northern Ireland) Mark Allen	5

Final; Best of 19 frames
(England) Ronnie O'Sullivan (4)	10
(England) Kyren Wilson	9

== Final ==
Final: Best of 19 frames. Referee: Paul Collier. Ricoh Arena, Coventry, England, 11 November 2018.
Ronnie O'Sullivan (4); England	10–9	Kyren Wilson; England
Afternoon: 16–71 (50), 77–0 (61), 94–19 (94), 107–29 (107), 97–8 (86), 60–48, 38–79, 41–86 (86), 131–0 (131); Evening: 23–64, 46–72 (52), 94–0 (94), 88–2, 16–76 (56), 52–58 (52, 56), 16–104 (104), 24–65 (65), 71–61 (Wilson 61), 118–6 (110)
131	Highest break	104
3	Century breaks	1
8	50+ breaks	8

== Century breaks ==
Total: 31

- 147, 100 – Mark Selby
- 140, 123, 119, 109, 102, 102 – Mark Allen
- 139 – Ding Junhui
- 137, 131, 129, 127, 116, 114, 110, 109, 109, 107, 101 – Ronnie O'Sullivan
- 131, 125, 125, 104 – Kyren Wilson
- 123, 118, 110, 102 – Shaun Murphy
- 106, 100 – John Higgins
- 106 – Ryan Day
