= Kyren Wilson =

English snooker player (born 1991)

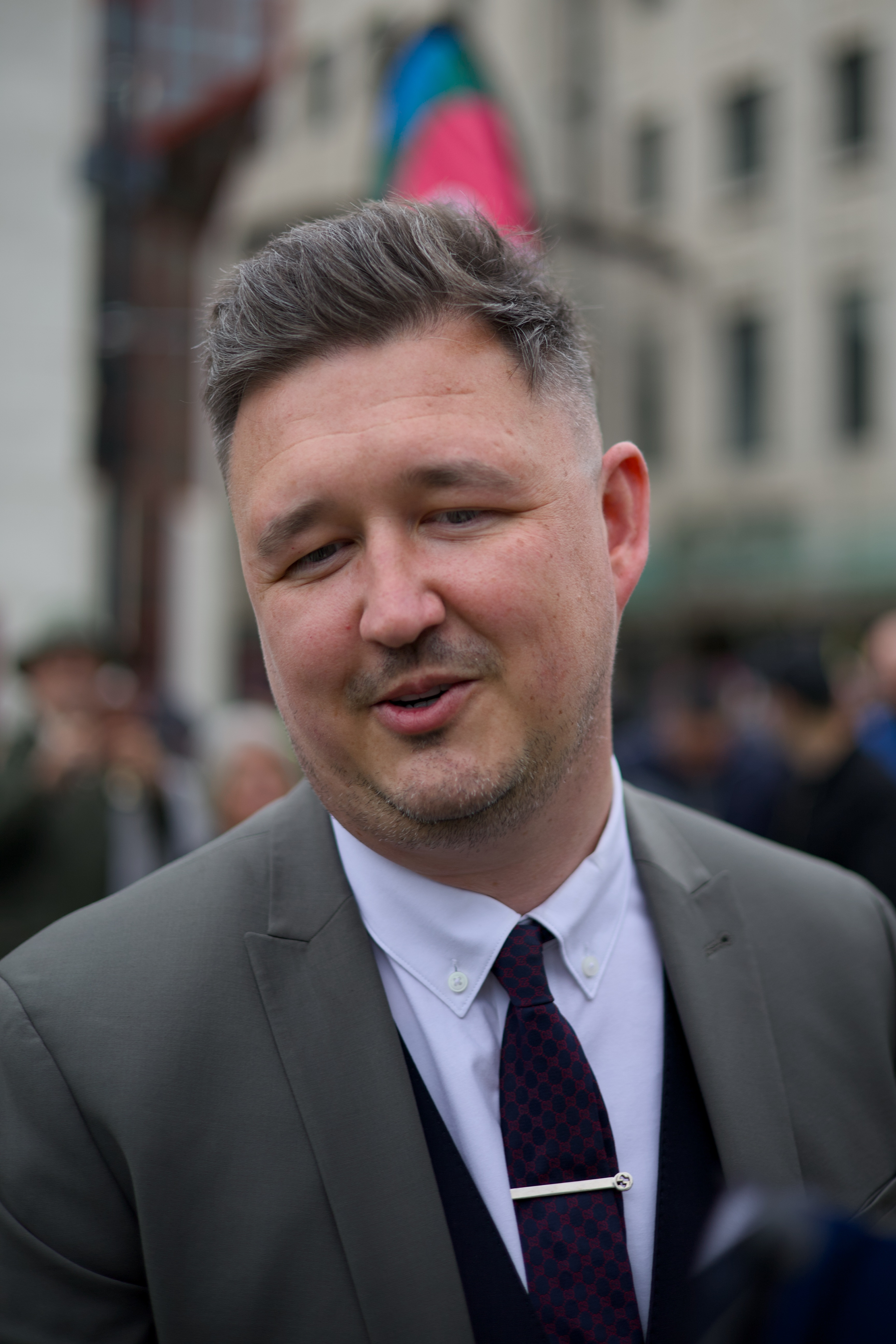
- Wilson at the World Snooker Green Carpet Ceremony 2026

Personal information
- Nickname: The Warrior
- Born: 23 December 1991 (age 34) Kettering, Northamptonshire, England

Sport
- Country: England
- Sport: Snooker
- Professional: 2010/2011, 2013–present
- Highest ranking: 2 (September 2024–May 2026)
- Current ranking: 8 (as of 7 November 2026)
- Maximum breaks: 5
- Century breaks: 592 (as of 19 November 2026)

Tournament wins
- Ranking: 12
- World Championship: 2024
Medal record
Mixed snooker
Representing Great Britain
World Games
Gold medal – first place	2017 Wrocław	Individual

Kyren Wilson (/ˈkaɪrən/; born 23 December 1991) is an English professional snooker player from Kettering. He is a former World Snooker Champion and has won 12 ranking titles.

Wilson made his professional tour debut in the 2010–11 season after finishing fifth in the 2009–10 International Open Series rankings. He dropped off the tour after one season but regained his tour card for the 2013–14 season and has played professionally since. In September 2015, while ranked 54th in the world, he won his first ranking title by defeating Judd Trump 10‍–‍9 in the final of the Shanghai Masters. His other ranking titles include the 2019 German Masters, where he defeated David Gilbert 9‍–‍7 in the final; the 2022 European Masters, where he defeated Barry Hawkins 9–3 in the final; the inaugural 2024 Xi'an Grand Prix, where he defeated Trump 10–8 in the final; the 2024 Northern Ireland Open, where he defeated Trump 9–3 in the final; and the 2025 German Masters, where he defeated Hawkins 10–9 in the final. He also won the 2025 Players Championship, beating Trump 10-9 in the final.

Wilson has played in five Triple Crown finals, two at the World Snooker Championship and three at the Masters. He lost to Mark Allen and Shaun Murphy in the Masters finals of 2018 and 2025 respectively, both times by a 7–10 scoreline, and lost 8–18 to Ronnie O'Sullivan in the 2020 World Snooker Championship final. He won his first world title and first Triple Crown title at the 2024 World Snooker Championship, beating Jak Jones 18–14 in the final, and won his second Triple Crown title at the 2026 Masters, defeating John Higgins 10–6 in the final. He has compiled more than 500 century breaks in professional competition, including five maximum breaks.

== Career ==
=== Early career (2009–2013) ===
During the 2009–10 season, Wilson won the sixth event of the International Open Series having already finished runner-up in the third event, and he finished the season fifth in the rankings. This gave Wilson a place on the World Snooker Tour for the 2010–11 snooker season. In the UK Championship he defeated Paul Davison 9–6 and Ian McCulloch 9–8, before losing 4–9 to Rory McLeod in the third round. He reached the same stage of the World Championship qualifying with defeats of Dermot McGlinchey and Joe Swail, before McLeod once again conquered Wilson this time 10–3 in the third round of qualifying. He finished the year ranked world number 72 and did not retain his place on tour. Wilson entered the 2011 Q School to win back his place on Tour, but was unable to do so.

Having dropped off the Tour, Wilson was considered an amateur player and could not enter qualifying for any of the ranking events. He entered 12 of the Players Tour Championship (PTC) events and finished 72nd on the Order of Merit. He entered the 2012 Q School but only won one match over three events. In the 2012–13 season, Wilson was again confined to entering amateur events and enjoyed a good run in the PTC Event 4 by beating Tom Ford, Jamie Jones and Stephen Maguire, before being whitewashed 4–0 by Ding Junhui in the last 16. He also lost in the last 32 in two European Tour events to be ranked 75th on the PTC Order of Merit. He then turned professional in 2013 for the 2013–14 season.

=== 2013–14 season ===
Wilson enjoyed a successful return to the professional game during the 2013–14 season. He won four matches in Shanghai Masters qualifying, concluding with a 5–3 victory over Marcus Campbell to reach the main stage of a ranking event for the first time. In his first round match against Stuart Bingham, Wilson had a chance to make a 147 but missed the 13th black. Nevertheless, he defeated his much higher ranked opponent 5–1 and continued his run with a 5–3 win over Marco Fu. Wilson's tournament came to an end in the quarter-finals as he lost 1–5 against Michael Holt. He caused another upset in the first round of the International Championship by beating Stephen Maguire 6–3, before losing 1–6 to Graeme Dott in the second round. He also qualified for the China Open, but was eliminated 5–3 by Jamie O'Neill in the opening round.

In World Championship qualifying, Wilson beat Chris Norbury 10–6 and then defeated Alfie Burden and Rod Lawler, both by 10–3 score lines, to stand just one win away from making his first appearance at the main stage of the tournament. In the fourth qualifying round, he faced the 2006 winner of the event Graeme Dott and came back from 1–4 down to trail only 4–5 at the end of the first session. His momentum continued into the evening, and he took the last four frames of the match, including three breaks over 50, to win 10–7. In anticipation of playing his first match at the Crucible, Wilson described it as a "dream come true" and said that he would like to draw Ronnie O'Sullivan in the first round. Dott stated that Wilson could "beat anybody" if he played to the same standard again. Wilson played world number 12 Ricky Walden in the first round of the championship, losing 7–10 after a final frame that lasted for over an hour.

=== 2014–15 season ===
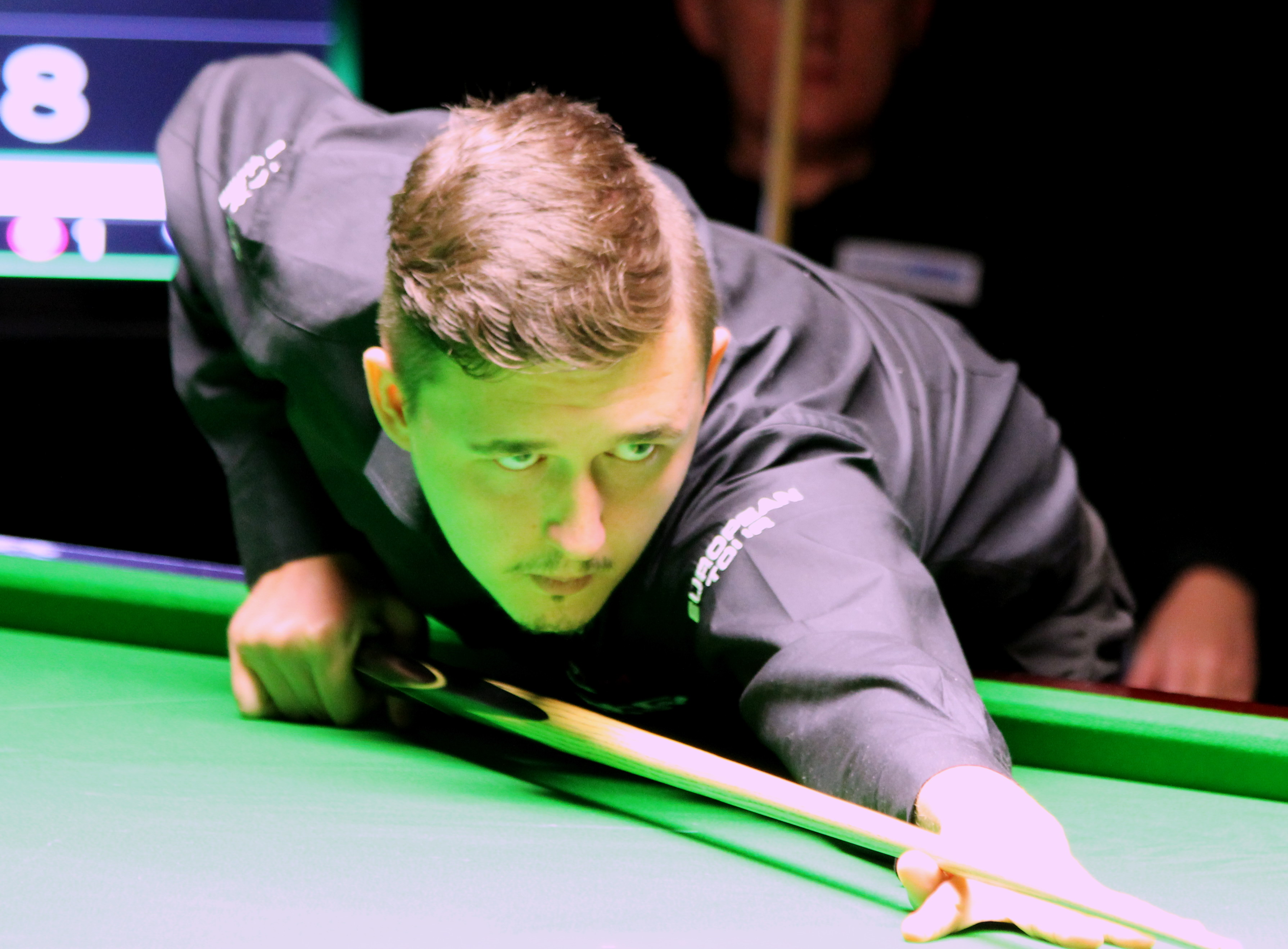
Wilson during the 2014 Paul Hunter Classic

Wilson failed to qualify for the first three ranking events of the 2014–15 season, before beating Ross Muir to play in the first round of the International Championship where he lost 2–6 to Sam Baird. After edging Gary Wilson 6–5 in the first round of the UK Championship, Wilson stated that his concentration had been fading in matches this season and would have to raise his game significantly against defending champion Neil Robertson. He did exactly that as he made an 87 break to lead 5–4 and had a chance to win in the next frame courtesy of a fluked red, but lost position on the final brown allowing Robertson to level. In the decider Wilson missed a tough opening red and Robertson responded with a match winning 86.

After losing in the semi-finals of the 2015 Snooker Shoot-Out, Wilson had his best finish of the year in a ranking event as he dropped just one frame in his victories over Alan McManus and Ben Woollaston at the Indian Open. In the next round, he was defeated 3–4 by Joe Perry. Wilson ended the season as world number 56.

=== 2015–16 season: first ranking title ===
It's every player's dream to win his first ranking title. It will always stay in my memory. This is my breakthrough. I felt like crying at the end because it means so much to me. It felt as if it was slipping away from me, so to pull through in the end was just a relief. The fans were fantastic and the noise will live with me forever.

— Wilson on winning his first ranking title at the Shanghai Masters.

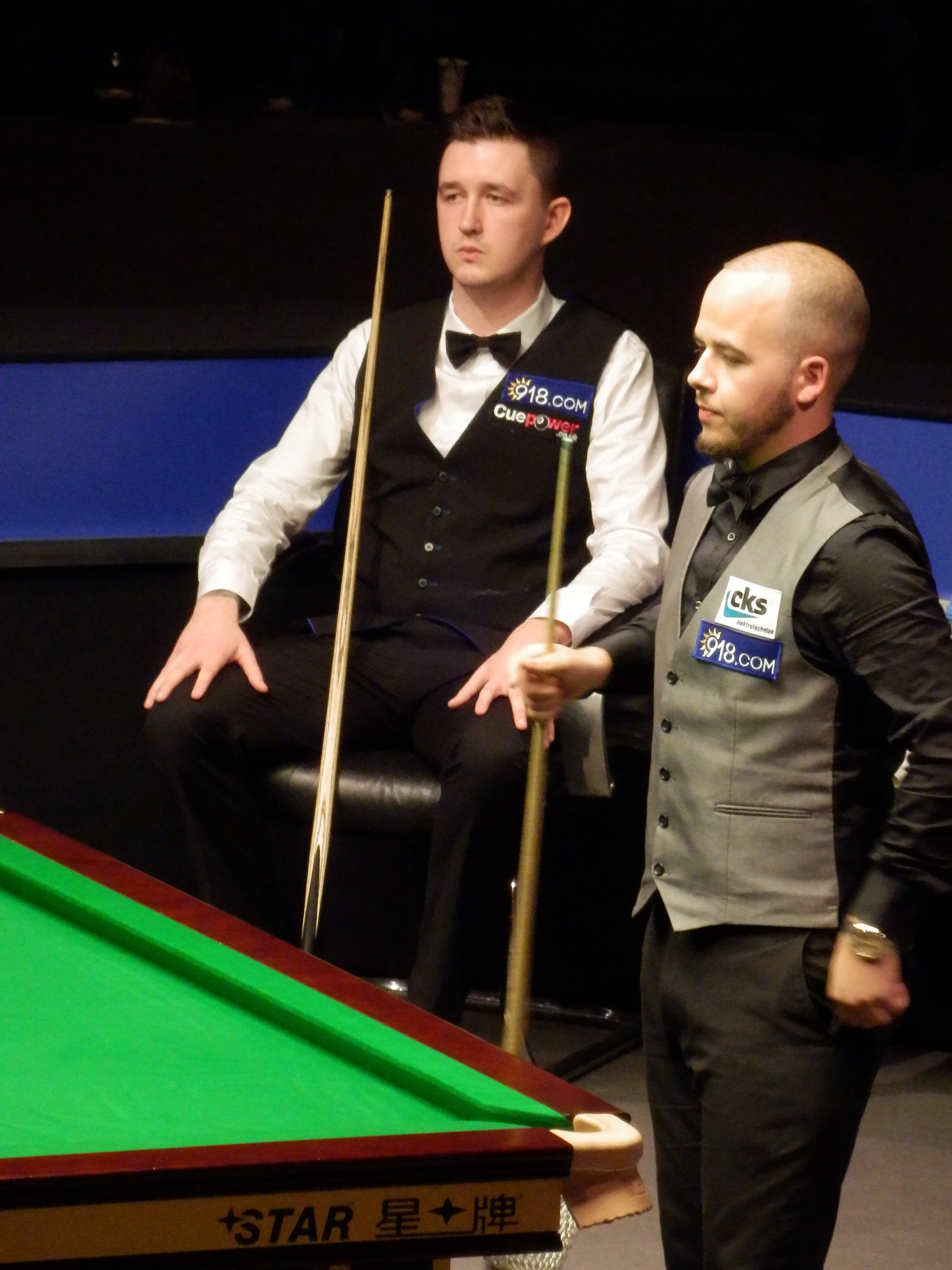
Wilson reached the semi-final of the 2016 German Masters before losing to Luca Brecel.

Wilson won three matches to qualify for the 2015 Shanghai Masters and came through a wildcard round match in China, before beating Joe Perry 5–2 and Michael Holt 5–1. In Wilson's second career ranking event quarter-final he led home favourite Ding Junhui 3–1, before Ding levelled at 3–3. The match went to a deciding frame, which Wilson won on the final black. Wilson then eliminated Mark Allen 6–1 to reach his first ranking final, where his match with Judd Trump went to a deciding frame, after Wilson had led 7–3, 8–4 and 9–7. In the decider, Wilson made a championship winning 75 break to claim his first ranking title. Ranked world number 54, Wilson become the lowest ranked player to win a ranking title since 2005, however he rose to 22nd after the event.

After the Shanghai success, Wilson lost in the last 32 of the two next ranking events: 3–6 to Mark Allen at the International Championship and 1–6 to Tom Ford at the UK Championship. At the German Masters, after beating Rory McLeod, Michael Holt and Ryan Day, all by 5–4 scorelines, he reached the semi-finals, but was defeated 6–3 by Luca Brecel who became the first Belgian player to reach the final of a ranking event.

Along with Anthony Hamilton at the China Open qualifiers, Wilson set a new record of six consecutive centuries in a snooker match, four of which were scored by him. In the first round of the Welsh Open, Wilson lost 3–4 to Irish player Leo Fernandez. He finished fourth on the World Grand Prix Order of Merit, and at the event he lost 1–4 to Joe Perry in the last 16. At the China Open he was knocked out 5–1 in the second round by Rod Lawler. Wilson came through World Championship qualifying and then edged out Joe Perry 10–9 in the opening round. In the second round he took a 7–1 lead over Mark Allen after the first session and also led 11–5, before Allen won four frames in a row. Wilson then took the two frames he needed to reach the quarter-finals and made the tournament's high break of 143 against Mark Selby, but lost 8–13. His ended the year at 16th in the world rankings.

=== 2016–17 season ===
Wilson recovered from 0–3 down to Xiao Guodong in the second round of the Indian Open to win 4–3 and would go on to play in the final after eliminating Nigel Bond 4–1 in the semi-finals. He faced Anthony McGill and was tied at 2–2 at the interval, but McGill pulled away to triumph 5–2. In the fourth round of the Northern Ireland Open, Wilson was 3–0 up before his opponent Ronnie O'Sullivan restricted him to one pot as he levelled with three successive centuries. Wilson held his nerve to win 4–3 and then beat Mark Williams 5–4. In the semi-finals he lost 2–6 to Mark King. Wilson played in the Masters for the first time and was eliminated 6–3 by Ding Junhui.

Wilson overcame Ding 5–1 in the quarter-finals of the China Open, but never got ahead of Mark Selby in a 6–4 semi-final defeat. Wilson was a seeded player at the World Championship for the first time and battled past David Grace 10–6 in the opening round. He had a great start against Stuart Bingham in round two as he won the first five frames and he went on to reach the quarter-finals of the event for the second year in a row with a 13–10 win. The tip of Wilson's cue split at 3–3 and John Higgins would progress 13–6.

=== 2017–18 season: Masters finalist ===
Wilson made his first official maximum break against Martin Gould in the second round of the International Championship, but eventually lost 5–6. In January 2018, Wilson reached the final of the Masters, becoming the first person born in the 1990s to appear in any Triple Crown final. He was beaten by Mark Allen in a close match. Wilson also reached two ranking finals that season, losing to Ding Junhui and Ronnie O'Sullivan. At the World Championship as he reached the semi-finals (beating Allen 13–6 in the last eight) before losing 13–17 to John Higgins. Wilson made a 140 break in frame seven, after which the match was delayed for a time when he suffered a nosebleed.

=== 2018–19 season ===
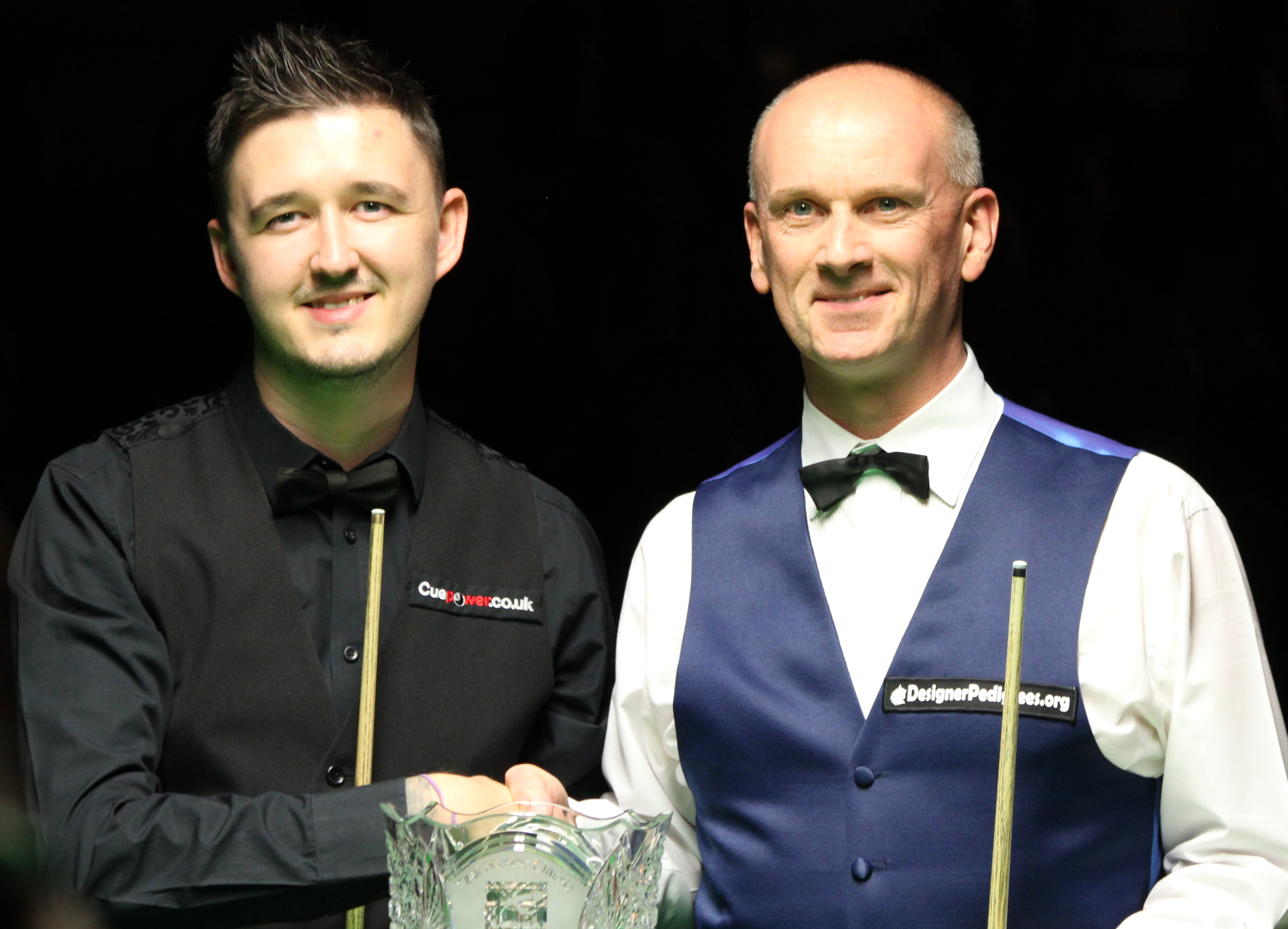
Wilson defeated Peter Ebdon at the 2018 Paul Hunter Classic.

In August 2018, Wilson claimed his second ranking event title at the Paul Hunter Classic, defeating 2002 World Champion Peter Ebdon 4–2 in the final. In September, he won his second consecutive tournament, the non-ranking Six-red World Championship, defeating Ding Junhui in the final 8–4. He then reached the semi-finals of the Shanghai Masters where, after tying the match at 6–6, he lost 6–10 to defending and eventual champion Ronnie O'Sullivan.

At the Champion of Champions tournament in November, Wilson beat world champion Mark Williams and Judd Trump by dropping only a frame in each match, before defeating Masters champion Mark Allen to face Ronnie O'Sullivan in the final. O'Sullivan led 5–1 and 8–5, but Wilson pulled back to lead 9–8 before eventually losing 9–10. In the Northern Ireland Open, Wilson played a seven-frame match that lasted over three hours, against Lee Walker (whose average shot time was 38 seconds), losing 3–4 in the deciding frame. He then reached the quarter-final stage of the UK Championship, losing 1–6 to Stuart Bingham.

He won the German Masters in February 2019, beating David Gilbert 9–7 in the final. Having trailed 5–7, Wilson recovered to win the last four frames of the match for his third ranking title. He made quarter-final appearances at three further ranking events before the end of the season, at the World Grand Prix, the Tour Championship, and the World Championship.

=== 2019–20 season: World Championship finalist ===
Defending his title at the Paul Hunter Classic in August 2019, Wilson finished runner-up after a 3–4 defeat to Barry Hawkins in the final. Leading the match 3–2 and needing only a couple of pots to retain the title, Wilson broke down on 57, allowing Hawkins to force a deciding frame which he won. At the quarter-final stage of the Shanghai Masters in September, Wilson led 5–1 against defending champion Ronnie O'Sullivan and was just one frame away from progressing to the next round, but then lost five straight frames and the match 5–6. He reached the semi-finals of the World Open in October, losing 5–6 to Thepchaiya Un-Nooh.

After losing to Stuart Bingham in the quarter-finals of the 2020 Masters, where he led 4–1 before being defeated 4–6, Wilson beat defending champion Judd Trump 4–3 in the second round of the World Grand Prix in February 2020; he then defeated John Higgins in the quarter-finals 5–4, before being knocked out in the semi-finals by Neil Robertson 4–6. The following week, he reached the final of the Welsh Open; despite inflicting a 5–0 quarter-final whitewash on defending champion Neil Robertson, and making his second competitive 147 along the way, he was heavily defeated in the final by Shaun Murphy 9–1. He was runner-up at the 2020 Gibraltar Open in March; after defeating Thepchaiya Un-Nooh and Mark Williams, both 4–0, en route to the final, he missed out on the title with a 3–4 defeat to Judd Trump.

The 2020 World Snooker Championship was delayed by three months because of the COVID-19 pandemic, and Wilson received a bye for the first round due to Anthony Hamilton withdrawing from the tournament. Wilson defeated Martin Gould in the second round, defending champion Judd Trump in the quarter-finals, and Anthony McGill 17–16 in the semi-finals after fluking a match-winning green ball. He was visibly emotional during his semi-final victory and later apologised to McGill for having won the match on a fluke.

He played Ronnie O'Sullivan in the final. The first session was of poor standard, possibly due to both players reeling from narrow victories in their semi-finals, both ending with a deciding frame. Wilson trailed 2–6 after the first session and 2–8 in the second, but found form to reduce his deficit to 7–9. The day ended with O'Sullivan leading 10–7, after Wilson missed a crucial red along the cushion that would probably have led to him winning the 17th frame. He started strongly in the third session with a break of 73 but then lost eight successive frames and lost the final 8–18.

=== 2020–21 season ===
Wilson started the new season as world number 6. At the European Masters, he got through the first rounds to play against Judd Trump at the quarter-final stage. In this best-of-nine match, Trump won the first four frames; Kyren then halved the deficit to 2–4, but Trump's century in the seventh frame meant the end of the tournament for Wilson. The two met again a few weeks later at the 2020 English Open, also in the quarter-final. In this match as well, Kyren fell short and eventually lost 1–5 to eventual champion Trump.

In the 2020 Championship league, which was a ranking tournament for the first time in this season, Kyren topped all three group stages to reach his tenth ranking final. He played against world number one Judd Trump for the third time in just a few weeks. In this best-of-five match, Wilson claimed the first frame, but Trump responded with a break of 118 to level the match. Kyren then regained the lead and eventually won the match 3–1 with a break of 88 in the fourth frame, to claim his fourth ranking event victory.

In the 2021 Masters, Wilson beat debutant Gary Wilson 6–2 in the opening round, before losing 5–6 to David Gilbert in the quarter-finals. Wilson met Gary Wilson again in the first round of the World Championship, coming from 1–5 down to an eventual 10–8 victory. In the second round, he beat Barry Hawkins 13–10, before recovering from 1–4 and 2–5 down against Neil Robertson in the quarter-finals, winning the last five frames to win 13–8. In the semi-finals, Wilson faced Shaun Murphy and, having produced three century breaks to lead 6–2, he extended his lead to 10–4, making a fourth century break in the process. However, Wilson won just two more frames, as Murphy fought back to close the match 17–12. Wilson finished the season ranked sixth.

=== 2021–22 season ===
In the 2021–22 snooker season, Wilson attempted to win his third Championship League in a row, but was eliminated in the third group stage without winning a match in that group. He then reached consecutive semi-finals at the Champion of Champions and the UK Championship. At the former he recorded victories over Jordan Brown and Neil Robertson, before being whitewashed 6–0 by Judd Trump. At the UK Championship, he won 6–5 in a final frame decider against Ronnie O'Sullivan in the quarter-finals, before losing 4–6 to Luca Brecel in the semi-finals. After a 1–6 defeat to Trump in the quarter-finals of the Masters, he reached his first ranking final of the season at the Gibraltar Open where he lost 2–4 to Robert Milkins. At the World Championship, Wilson defeated Ding Junhui 10–8 in the first round, before losing 9–13 to Stuart Bingham in the last 16.

=== 2022–23 season ===
After three draws in the Championship League first group stage, Wilson won his first ranking title for almost two years after winning the European Masters. He recorded victories over Lyu Haotian, Jimmy Robertson, Shaun Murphy, Si Jiahui and Ali Carter, before defeating Barry Hawkins 9–3 in the final. Afterwards he credited his dad with helping him to win. After this victory he reached the quarter-finals of the Scottish Open, losing 3–5 to Gary Wilson from 3–1 ahead after having a "heated exchange" with his opponent during the interval; and the German Masters where he lost 2–5 to Tom Ford. After losing 3–6 to Shaun Murphy in the semi-finals of the Players Championship, he reached his second ranking event final of the season, the Tour Championship, where he was again defeated by Murphy, this time by a score of 10–7 despite Wilson having an early lead of 4–0. At the World Championship, Wilson recorded a maximum break in the fifth frame of his 10–5 first round victory over Ryan Day. He exited in the next round after a disappointing 2–13 defeat to John Higgins.

=== 2023–24 season: World Champion ===
Wilson started the 2023–24 season with just one defeat in his opening 10 matches (a group match loss to Chris Wakelin in the Championship League), before losing 3–5 to John Higgins in the quarter-final of the European Masters where he was defending champion. He did not progress as far in another tournament until the German Masters in February 2024 where he lost 3–6 to Si Jiahui in the semi-finals. He also reached the quarter-final of the World Open where he lost 2–5 to Judd Trump. At the World Championship, Wilson attempted a maximum break for the second consecutive year but missed the 12th red during his first-round match against Dominic Dale; he proceeded to win the match 10–1. In the second round, he beat debutant Joe O'Connor 13–6, before reversing his fortunes from the previous season by defeating John Higgins 13–8 in the quarter-finals. He then beat David Gilbert 17–11 in the semi-finals to reach his second World Championship final. There he managed to defeat Jak Jones 18–14 to earn his first world title.

=== 2024–25 season ===
In the first half of the 2024–25 season, Wilson won two ranking events, the Xi'an Grand Prix and the Northern Ireland Open. Wilson defeated Trump in both finals by the scores of 10–8 and 9–3 respectively. In November, Wilson reached the semi-final of the 2024 UK Championship but was defeated 2–6 by Judd Trump. In January 2025, Wilson reached the final of the 2025 Masters but was defeated 7–10 by Shaun Murphy at the Alexandra Palace.

In February, Wilson won the 2025 German Masters in Berlin. He defeated Barry Hawkins in the final 10–9 to win his ninth career ranking title. Wilson won his fourth ranking event of the season at the Players Championship, winning 10–9 against Trump. Victory secured the tenth ranking event win of his career, and moved him level with Jimmy White on the all time list. Wilson was unable to defend his world title at the 2025 World Championship, losing in the first round 9–10 to Lei Peifan. Wilson became the 20th consecutive first-time champion to fail to defend their title since the event moved to the Crucible in 1977.

After the season Wilson was chosen as the winner of the Journalists’ Player of the Year award and included into the WST Hall of Fame for his World Championship win a year prior.

=== 2025–26 season: Masters champion ===
In August, Wilson was victorious at the Shanghai Masters, scoring five centuries in the final to defeat Carter 11–9. In January 2026, Wilson won the Masters, his second triple crown title, after defeating John Higgins 10–6 in the final. It was his first Masters title having lost two previous finals in the competition. At the 2026 World Championship, he exited in the second round following a 9–13 defeat against Allen.

=== 2026–27 season ===
Wilson progressed to the final of the 2026 Shanghai Masters, where he was defeated by Trump 6–11. He also reached the final of the Northern Ireland Open, and secured his 11th ranking-event victory with a 9–2 victory over Jak Jones. In November, he defeated Higgins 10–8 to win the International Championship. One week later, he advanced to the final of the Champion of Champions by defeating Zhao, Carter and Murphy en route. In the final, he established a 9–3 lead over Wakelin, but saw his advantage reduced to 9–8. Wilson then won the next frame to secure his third consecutive title on tour.

== Personal life ==
Wilson and his wife Sophie have two sons.

He is a Chelsea F.C. supporter and is close friends with darts player Ricky Evans.

== Performance and rankings timeline ==
Snooker tournament history
Tournament	2010/ 11	2011/ 12	2012/ 13	2013/ 14	2014/ 15	2015/ 16	2016/ 17	2017/ 18	2018/ 19	2019/ 20		2020/ 21	2021/ 22	2022/ 23	2023/ 24	2024/ 25	2025/ 26	2026/ 27
Ranking (Note: It shows the ranking at the beginning of the season)	(Note: New players on the Main Tour do not have a ranking)	(Note: He was an amateur)			70	56	16	13	9	8		6	6	8	8	3	2	8
Ranking tournaments
Championship League	Non-Ranking Event											W	3R	RR	2R	RR	A	WD
China Open	LQ	A	A	1R	1R	2R	SF	SF	2R	Tournament Not Held								2R
Wuhan Open	Tournament Not Held														LQ	2R	1R	1R
British Open	Tournament Not Held												1R	1R	2R	3R	1R	2R
English Open	Tournament Not Held						3R	F	1R	3R		QF	QF	2R	LQ	3R	1R	QF
Shenzhen Open (Note: The event was called the Xi'an Grand Prix (2024/2025–2025/2026))	Tournament Not Held															W	3R	2R
Northern Ireland Open	Tournament Not Held						SF	1R	1R	4R		3R	2R	2R	LQ	W	QF	W
International Championship	Not Held		A	2R	1R	2R	A	2R	1R	2R		Not Held			2R	QF	2R	W
UK Championship	LQ	A	A	1R	2R	3R	1R	3R	QF	2R		QF	SF	2R	1R	SF	1R	
Shoot Out	Non-Ranking Event						1R	1R	3R	2R		WD	WD	1R	4R	A	A	
Scottish Open	Not Held		MR	Not Held			4R	3R	4R	3R		QF	1R	QF	3R	2R	3R	
German Masters	LQ	A	A	LQ	LQ	SF	LQ	LQ	W	LQ		LQ	QF	QF	SF	W	QF	
World Grand Prix	Tournament Not Held				NR	2R	1R	1R	QF	SF		QF	1R	2R	DNQ	2R	1R	
Players Championship (Note: The event was called the Players Tour Championship Grand Final (2010/2011–2015/2016))	DNQ	DNQ	DNQ	DNQ	DNQ	1R	DNQ	1R	1R	1R		SF	1R	SF	DNQ	W	DNQ	
Welsh Open	LQ	A	A	1R	1R	1R	1R	4R	2R	F		3R	3R	1R	1R	2R	2R	
World Open	LQ	A	A	LQ	Not Held		2R	F	3R	SF		Not Held			QF	2R	3R	
Tour Championship	Tournament Not Held								QF	DNQ		QF	DNQ	F	DNQ	QF	DNQ	
World Championship	LQ	A	A	1R	LQ	QF	QF	SF	QF	F		SF	2R	2R	W	1R	2R	
Non-ranking tournaments
Shanghai Masters	Ranking Event								SF	QF		Not Held			2R	2R	W	F
Champion of Champions	Not Held			A	A	SF	A	A	F	1R		QF	SF	1R	A	QF	QF	W
Riyadh Season Championship (Note: The event was called the World Masters of Snooker (2023/2024))	Tournament Not Held														A	QF	QF	
The Masters	A	A	A	A	A	A	1R	F	1R	QF		QF	QF	1R	1R	F	W	
Championship League	A	A	A	A	A	RR	RR	2R	RR	RR	RR	W	RR	SF	2R	F	WD	
Former ranking tournaments
Wuxi Classic	Non-Ranking		A	LQ	LQ	Tournament Not Held												
Australian Goldfields Open	NH	A	A	LQ	LQ	LQ	Tournament Not Held											
Shanghai Masters	LQ	A	A	QF	LQ	W	1R	LQ	Non-Ranking			Not Held			Non-Ranking Event			
Paul Hunter Classic	Minor-Ranking Event						2R	4R	W	NR		Tournament Not Held						
Indian Open	Not Held			WD	3R	NH	F	LQ	A	Tournament Not Held								
Riga Masters (Note: The event was called the Riga Open (2014/2015–2015/2016))	Tournament Not Held				Minor-Ranking		WD	3R	QF	WD		Tournament Not Held						
China Championship	Tournament Not Held						NR	LQ	WD	2R		Tournament Not Held						
WST Pro Series	Tournament Not Held											3R	Tournament Not Held					
Turkish Masters	Tournament Not Held												2R	Tournament Not Held				
Gibraltar Open	Tournament Not Held					MR	1R	QF	4R	F		3R	F	Tournament Not Held				
WST Classic	Tournament Not Held													4R	Tournament Not Held			
European Masters	Tournament Not Held						LQ	1R	3R	1R		QF	2R	W	QF	Not Held		
Saudi Arabia Masters	Tournament Not Held															6R	QF	NH
Former non-ranking tournaments
Shoot Out	A	A	A	A	SF	2R	Ranking Event											
Romanian Masters	Tournament Not Held							SF	Tournament Not Held									
Paul Hunter Classic	Minor-Ranking Event						Ranking Event			F		Tournament Not Held						
Six-red World Championship	A	NH	A	A	A	A	A	2R	W	2R		Not Held		A	Tournament Not Held			

Performance Table Legend
LQ	lost in the qualifying draw	#R	lost in the early rounds of the tournament (WR = Wildcard round, RR = Round robin)	QF	lost in the quarter-finals
SF	lost in the semi-finals	F	lost in the final	W	won the tournament
DNQ	did not qualify for the tournament	A	did not participate in the tournament	WD	withdrew from the tournament

NH / Not Held	means an event was not held
NR / Non-Ranking Event	means an event is/was no longer a ranking event
R / Ranking Event	means an event is/was a ranking event
MR / Minor-Ranking Event	means an event is/was a minor-ranking event
PA / Pro-am Event	means an event is/was a pro-am event

== Career finals ==
=== Ranking finals: 20 (12 titles) ===
Legend
World Championship (1–1)
Other (12–7)

Outcome	No.	Year	Championship	Opponent	Score	Ref.
Winner	1.	2015	Shanghai Masters	(England) Judd Trump	10–9	
Runner-up	1.	2016	Indian Open	(Scotland) Anthony McGill	2–5	
Runner-up	2.	2017	World Open	(China) Ding Junhui	3–10	
Runner-up	3.	2017	English Open	(England) Ronnie O'Sullivan	2–9	
Winner	2.	2018	Paul Hunter Classic	(England) Peter Ebdon	4–2	
Winner	3.	2019	German Masters	(England) David Gilbert	9–7	
Runner-up	4.	2020	Welsh Open	(England) Shaun Murphy	1–9	
Runner-up	5.	2020	Gibraltar Open	(England) Judd Trump	3–4	
Runner-up	6.	2020	World Snooker Championship	(England) Ronnie O'Sullivan	8–18	
Winner	4.	2020	Championship League	(England) Judd Trump	3–1	
Runner-up	7.	2022	Gibraltar Open (2)	(England) Robert Milkins	2–4	
Winner	5.	2022	European Masters	(England) Barry Hawkins	9–3	
Runner-up	8.	2023	Tour Championship	(England) Shaun Murphy	7–10	
Winner	6.	2024	World Snooker Championship	(Wales) Jak Jones	18–14	
Winner	7.	2024	Xi'an Grand Prix	(England) Judd Trump	10–8	
Winner	8.	2024	Northern Ireland Open	(England) Judd Trump	9–3	
Winner	9.	2025	German Masters (2)	(England) Barry Hawkins	10–9	
Winner	10.	2025	Players Championship	(England) Judd Trump	10–9	
Winner	11.	2026	Northern Ireland Open (2)	(Wales) Jak Jones	9–2	
Winner	12.	2026	International Championship	(Scotland) John Higgins	10–8	

=== Non-ranking finals: 13 (6 titles) ===
Legend
The Masters (1–2)
Champion of Champions (1–1)
Other (4–4)

Outcome	No.	Year	Championship	Opponent	Score	Ref.
Winner	1.	2017	World Games	(England) Ali Carter	3–1	
Runner-up	1.	2018	The Masters	(Northern Ireland) Mark Allen	7–10	
Winner	2.	2018	Six-red World Championship	(China) Ding Junhui	8–4	
Runner-up	2.	2018	Champion of Champions	(England) Ronnie O'Sullivan	9–10	
Runner-up	3.	2019	Paul Hunter Classic	(England) Barry Hawkins	3–4	
Winner	3.	2021	Championship League Invitational	(Wales) Mark Williams	3–2	
Runner-up	4.	2024	Helsinki International Cup	(England) Ali Carter	3–6	
Runner-up	5.	2025	The Masters (2)	(England) Shaun Murphy	7–10	
Runner-up	6.	2025	Championship League Invitational	(England) Mark Selby	0–3	
Winner	4.	2025	Shanghai Masters	(England) Ali Carter	11–9	
Winner	5.	2026	The Masters	(Scotland) John Higgins	10–6	
Runner-up	7.	2026	Shanghai Masters	(England) Judd Trump	6–11	
Winner	6.	2026	Champion of Champions	(England) Chris Wakelin	10–8	

=== Amateur finals: 2 (1 title) ===
Outcome	No.	Year	Championship	Opponent	Score	Ref.
Runner-up	1.	2009	PIOS – Event 3	(England) Paul Davison	4–6	
Winner	1.	2010	PIOS – Event 6	(England) Liam Highfield	6–4	
