= 2018 Romanian Masters =

Romanian Masters

Tournament information
- Dates: 14–18 March 2018
- Venue: Bucharest Metropolitan Circus
- City: Bucharest
- Country: Romania
- Organisation: WPBSA
- Format: Non-ranking event
- Total prize fund: €200,000 (£176,800)
- Winner's share: €50,000 (£44,200)
- Highest break: (England) Stuart Bingham (137)

Final
- Champion: (Wales) Ryan Day
- Runner-up: (England) Stuart Bingham
- Score: 10–8

The 2018 Romanian Masters was a non-ranking snooker tournament that took place from 14 to 18 March 2018 in Bucharest, Romania. Sanctioned by World Snooker, the tournament was organised by McCann/Thiess Events and McCann Bucharest and was a 16-player invitational event.

12 of the world's top 16 players returned to Romania, after Bucharest staged the 2016 European Masters in the 2016/2017 season.

Ryan Day won his third trophy of the 2017/2018 season, beating Stuart Bingham 10–8 in the final.

== Main draw ==
Last 16; Best of 7 frames
1	(England) Mark Selby	2
15	(China) Liang Wenbo	4
8	(England) Stuart Bingham	4
10	(Australia) Neil Robertson	3
5	(Wales) Mark Williams	0
9	(England) Ali Carter	4
*	(England) Mark King	0
16	(Scotland) Stephen Maguire	4
3	(Scotland) John Higgins	4
13	(Scotland) Anthony McGill	2
6	(England) Barry Hawkins	2
14	(Wales) Ryan Day	4
7	(Northern Ireland) Mark Allen	2
11	(England) Kyren Wilson	4
2	(England) Judd Trump	4
12	(Belgium) Luca Brecel	0

Quarter-finals; Best of 7 frames
15	(China) Liang Wenbo	1
8	(England) Stuart Bingham	4
9	(England) Ali Carter	4
16	(Scotland) Stephen Maguire	3
3	(Scotland) John Higgins	1
14	(Wales) Ryan Day	4
11	(England) Kyren Wilson	4
2	(England) Judd Trump	2

Semi-finals; Best of 9 frames
8	(England) Stuart Bingham	5
9	(England) Ali Carter	2
14	(Wales) Ryan Day	5
11	(England) Kyren Wilson	0

Final; Best of 19 frames
8	(England) Stuart Bingham	8
14	(Wales) Ryan Day	10

Notes

* Mark King replaced 4th seed Shaun Murphy after the draw had taken place.

== Final ==
Final: Best of 19 frames. Referee: Alex Crișan. Bucharest Metropolitan Circus, Bucharest, Romania, 18 March 2018.
Stuart Bingham (8); England	8–10	Ryan Day (14); Wales
Afternoon: 65–45, 71–20 (57), 90–1 (84), 71–0, 52–62, 8–63 (62), 13–77 (52), 124–0 (124), 7–62; Evening: 0–85 (50), 66–77, 84–0 (84), 58–2, 37–61, 111–0 (111), 0–82 (61), 0–92, 59–66
124	Highest break	62
2	Century breaks	0
5	50+ breaks	4

== Century breaks ==
Total: 11

- 137, 124, 111 – Stuart Bingham
- 136, 133 – Ali Carter
- 130 – Mark Allen
- 120 – Ryan Day
- 118, 101 – Judd Trump
- 109, 108 – Stephen Maguire
