= 2019 German Masters =

2019 D88.com German Masters
Tournament information
- Dates: 30 January – 3 February 2019
- Venue: Tempodrom
- City: Berlin
- Country: Germany
- Organisation: World Snooker
- Format: Ranking event
- Total prize fund: £400,000
- Winner's share: £80,000
- Highest break: David Gilbert (ENG) (139)

Final
- Champion: Kyren Wilson (ENG)
- Runner-up: David Gilbert (ENG)
- Score: 9–7

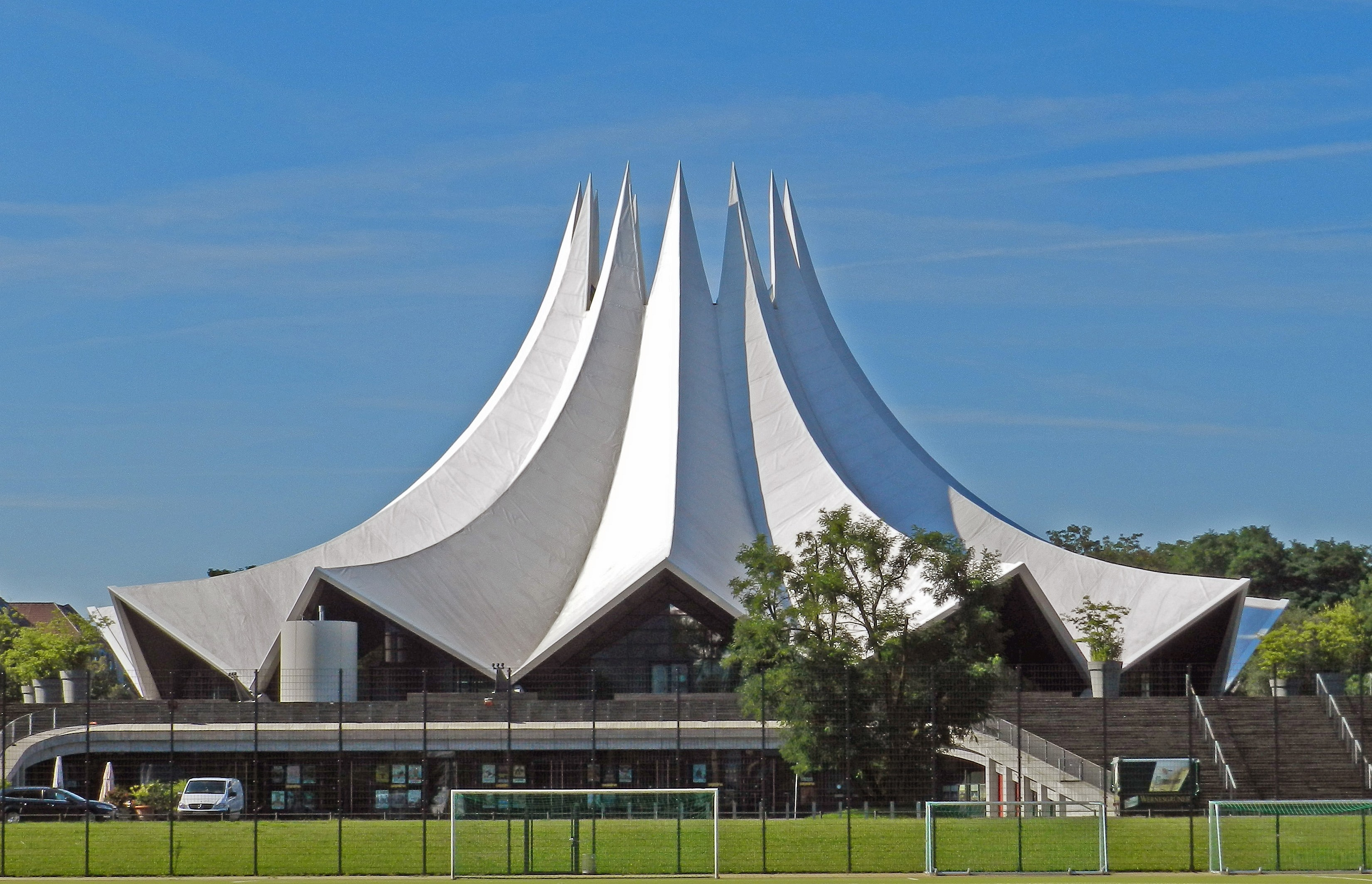
Tempodrom (Berlin)

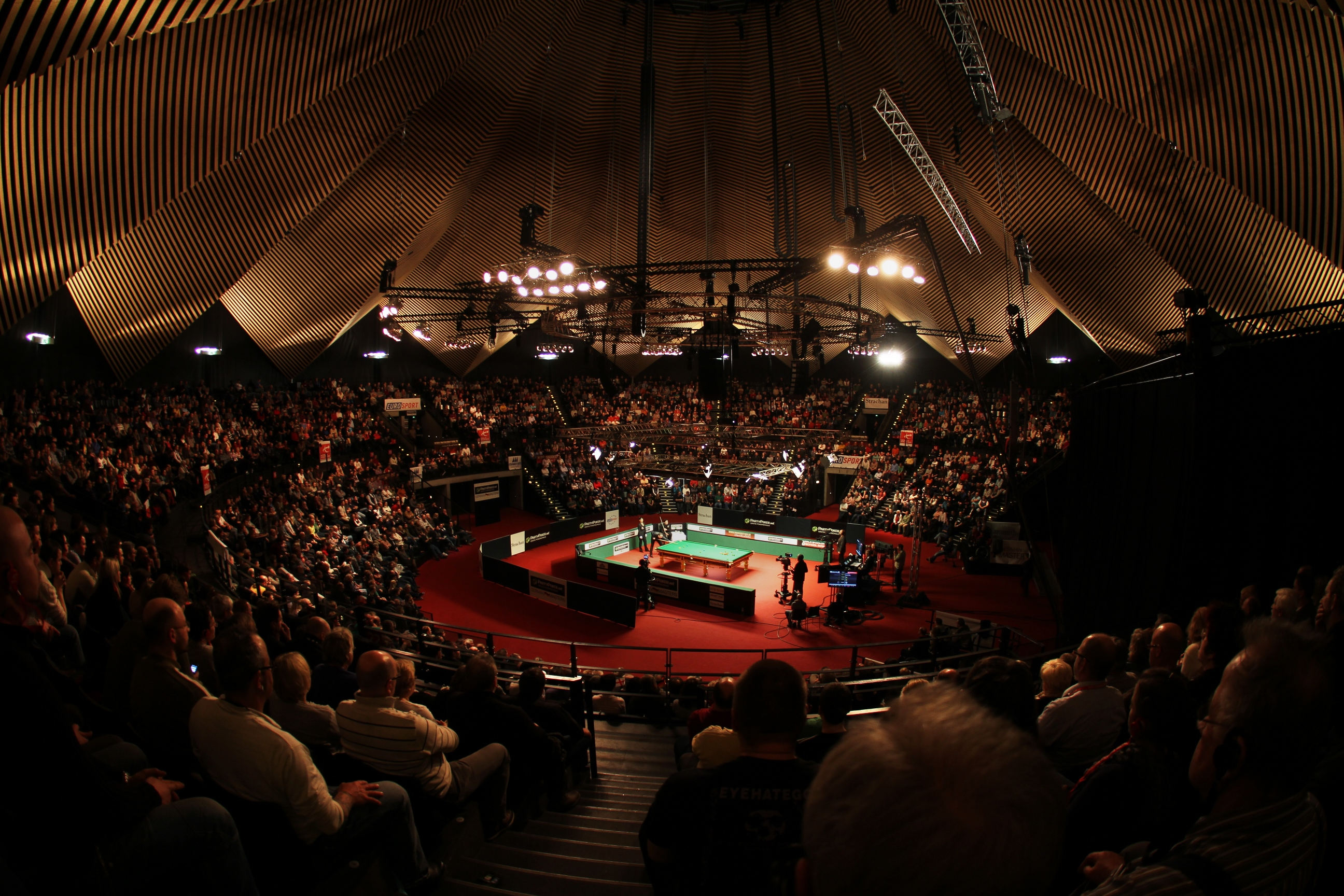
Interior of main arena during the 2012 German Masters final

The 2019 German Masters (officially the 2019 D88.com German Masters) was a professional ranking snooker tournament, taking place from 30 January to 3 February 2019 in Berlin, Germany. The tournament was the eleventh ranking event of the 2018/2019 season.

The event was won by Kyren Wilson, who won his third career ranking event, defeating David Gilbert in the final 9–7.

Mark Williams was the defending champion, but he lost 5–0 to Kyren Wilson in the quarter-finals.

Judd Trump made his fourth career maximum break, in the second qualifying round of the event, in his 5–0 win over Lukas Kleckers. David Gilbert made the main event's highest break; with a break of 139.

Despite never previously reaching the last 16 of a ranking event, Duane Jones reached the semi-finals, defeating top 16 players Ding Junhui and Jack Lisowski.

== Tournament Summary ==
Two rounds of qualifying took place between 18 and 21 December 2018 at the Barnsley Metrodome in Barnsley, England. The main event featured 32 players, held between 30 January and 3 February 2019 on four tables.

== Prize fund ==
The breakdown of prize money for this year is shown below:

- Winner: £80,000
- Runner-up: £35,000
- Semi-final: £20,000
- Quarter-final: £10,000
- Last 16: £5,000
- Last 32: £4,000
- Last 64: £3,000
- Highest break: £1,500
- Total: £396,500

The "rolling 147 prize" for a maximum break: £5,000

== Main draw ==
Last 32; Best of 9 frames
Mark Williams (WAL)	5
Zhou Yuelong (CHN)	3
Sam Baird (ENG)	4
Joe Perry (ENG)	5
Peter Ebdon (ENG)	5
Shaun Murphy (ENG)	3
Rory McLeod (ENG)	3
Kyren Wilson (ENG)	5
Barry Hawkins (ENG)	4
Robert Milkins (ENG)	5
Stephen Maguire (SCO)	5
Michael Georgiou (CYP)	1
Yan Bingtao (CHN)	5
Matthew Stevens (WAL)	3
Li Hang (CHN)	2
Judd Trump (ENG)	5
John Higgins (SCO)	4
Yuan Sijun (CHN)	5
Jack Lisowski (ENG)	2
Duane Jones (WAL)	5
Xiao Guodong (CHN)	5
Ryan Day (WAL)	1
Fergal O'Brien (IRL)	3
Ding Junhui (CHN)	5
Neil Robertson (AUS)	5
Kurt Maflin (NOR)	1
Stuart Bingham (ENG)	5
Jimmy Robertson (ENG)	2
David Gilbert (ENG)	5
Ben Woollaston (ENG)	2
Ricky Walden (ENG)	1
Mark Selby (ENG)	5

Last 16; Best of 9 frames
(Wales) Mark Williams	5
(England) Joe Perry	0
(England) Peter Ebdon	2
(England) Kyren Wilson	5
(England) Robert Milkins	1
(Scotland) Stephen Maguire	5
(China) Yan Bingtao	1
(England) Judd Trump	5
(China) Yuan Sijun	3
(Wales) Duane Jones	5
(China) Xiao Guodong	4
(China) Ding Junhui	5
(Australia) Neil Robertson	5
(England) Stuart Bingham	0
(England) David Gilbert	5
(England) Mark Selby	4

Quarter-finals; Best of 9 frames
(Wales) Mark Williams	0
(England) Kyren Wilson	5
(Scotland) Stephen Maguire	5
(England) Judd Trump	2
(Wales) Duane Jones	5
(China) Ding Junhui	3
(Australia) Neil Robertson	3
(England) David Gilbert	5

Semi-finals; Best of 11 frames
(England) Kyren Wilson	6
(Scotland) Stephen Maguire	1
(Wales) Duane Jones	1
(England) David Gilbert	6

Final; Best of 17 frames
(England) Kyren Wilson	9
(England) David Gilbert	7

== Final ==
Final: Best of 17 frames. Referee: Desislava Bozhilova; Tempodrom, Berlin, Germany, 3 February 2019.
Kyren Wilson; England	9–7	David Gilbert; England
Afternoon: 79–25, 74–0, 1–92, 87–0, 69–41, 0–95, 45–80, 101–0; Evening: 24–85, 0–102, 27–87, 36–94, 93–18, 58–47, 103–3, 78–0
93	Highest break	95
0	Century breaks	0

== Qualifying ==
Two rounds of qualifying matches took place between 18 and 21 December 2018 at the Barnsley Metrodome in Barnsley, England. All matches were best of 9 frames.

=== Round 1 ===
Mark Williams (WAL)	5–3	Fan Zhengyi (CHN)
Hossein Vafaei (IRN)	2–5	Jak Jones (WAL)
Zhou Yuelong (CHN)	5–4	Zhang Anda (CHN)
Michael Holt (ENG)	1–5	Dominic Dale (WAL)
Ali Carter (ENG)	2–5	Sam Craigie (ENG)
Sam Baird (ENG)	5–1	David Lilley (ENG)
Joe Perry (ENG)	5–2	Ashley Carty (ENG)
Andy Lee (HKG)	1–5	Chris Totten (SCO)
Farakh Ajaib (ENG)	2–5	Peter Ebdon (ENG)
Mark King (ENG)	5–2	Rod Lawler (ENG)
Jimmy White (ENG)	5–2	Harvey Chandler (ENG)
Shaun Murphy (ENG)	5–2	Martin O'Donnell (ENG)
Mark Davis (ENG)	4–5	Rory McLeod (ENG)
Martin Gould (ENG)	5–4	Adam Duffy (ENG)
Alfie Burden (ENG)	3–5	Oliver Lines (ENG)
Kyren Wilson (ENG)	5–1	Ian Burns (ENG)
Barry Hawkins (ENG)	5–1	Michael White (WAL)
Adam Stefanow (POL)	1–5	Stuart Carrington (ENG)
Robert Milkins (ENG)	5–1	Elliot Slessor (ENG)
Eden Sharav (ISR)	5–2	Allan Taylor (ENG)
Stephen Maguire (SCO)	5–3	Daniel Wells (WAL)
Xu Si (CHN)	0–5	Gerard Greene (NIR)
Graeme Dott (SCO)	5–1	Sean O'Sullivan (ENG)
Michael Georgiou (CYP)	5–2	Mei Xiwen (CHN)
Lu Ning (CHN)	5–2	Peter Lines (ENG)
Yan Bingtao (CHN)	5–3	Robin Hull (FIN)
Alan McManus (SCO)	0–5	Ken Doherty (IRL)
Luca Brecel (BEL)	3–5	Matthew Stevens (WAL)
Li Hang (CHN)	5–2	Lyu Haotian (CHN)
Anthony Hamilton (ENG)	1–5	Luo Honghao (CHN)
Hammad Miah (ENG)	2–5	Lukas Kleckers (GER)
Judd Trump (ENG)	5–2	Robbie Williams (ENG)

John Higgins (SCO)	5–0	Soheil Vahedi (IRN)
Zhang Jiankang (CHN)	3–5	Chris Wakelin (ENG)
Noppon Saengkham (THA)	5–1	Liam Highfield (ENG)
Yuan Sijun (CHN)	5–0	Ben Mertens (BEL)
Jack Lisowski (ENG)	5–1	Mark Joyce (ENG)
Gary Wilson (ENG)	5–4	Chen Zifan (CHN)
Anthony McGill (SCO)	4–5	Jordan Brown (NIR)
Alexander Ursenbacher (SUI)	3–5	Duane Jones (WAL)
Zhao Xintong (CHN)	5–0	Sanderson Lam (ENG)
Xiao Guodong (CHN)	5–2	Thor Chuan Leong (MAS)
Sunny Akani (THA)	5–0	Kishan Hirani (WAL)
Ryan Day (WAL)	5–3	Lee Walker (WAL)
Fergal O'Brien (IRL)	5–1	Tian Pengfei (CHN)
Liang Wenbo (CHN)	5–4	Thepchaiya Un-Nooh (THA)
Kuldesh Johal (ENG)	5–2	Zhang Yong (CHN)
Ding Junhui (CHN)	5–0	Nigel Bond (ENG)
Neil Robertson (AUS)	5–0	Jamie Clarke (WAL)
James Cahill (ENG)	5–3	Basem Eltahhan (EGY)
Tom Ford (ENG)	5–2	Joe O'Connor (ENG)
Paul Davison (ENG)	0–5	Kurt Maflin (NOR)
Stuart Bingham (ENG)	5–4	Chen Feilong (CHN)
Niu Zhuang (CHN)	5–4	Simon Lichtenberg (GER)
Jimmy Robertson (ENG)	5–1	Dechawat Poomjaeng (THA)
Joe Swail (NIR)	5–2	Richard Wienold (GER)
Craig Steadman (ENG)	5–2	Hamza Akbar (PAK)
David Gilbert (ENG)	5–2	Ashley Hugill (ENG)
Mike Dunn (ENG)	2–5	Ben Woollaston (ENG)
Marco Fu (HKG)	2–5	Matthew Selt (ENG)
Ross Muir (SCO)	5–1	Li Yuan (CHN)
Ricky Walden (ENG)	5–4	Scott Donaldson (SCO)
Andrew Higginson (ENG)	4–5	John Astley (ENG)
Mark Selby (ENG)	5–1	Billy Joe Castle (ENG)

=== Round 2 ===
(Wales) Mark Williams	5–1	(Wales) Jak Jones
(China) Zhou Yuelong	5–2	(Wales) Dominic Dale
(England) Sam Craigie	3–5	(England) Sam Baird
(England) Joe Perry	5–0	(Scotland) Chris Totten
(England) Peter Ebdon	5–4	(England) Mark King
(England) Jimmy White	2–5	(England) Shaun Murphy
(England) Rory McLeod	5–4	(England) Martin Gould
(England) Oliver Lines	2–5	(England) Kyren Wilson
(England) Barry Hawkins	5–4	(England) Stuart Carrington
(England) Robert Milkins	5–2	(Israel) Eden Sharav
(Scotland) Stephen Maguire	5–1	(Northern Ireland) Gerard Greene
(Scotland) Graeme Dott	4–5	(Cyprus) Michael Georgiou
(China) Lu Ning	4–5	(China) Yan Bingtao
(Republic of Ireland) Ken Doherty	2–5	(Wales) Matthew Stevens
(China) Li Hang	5–3	(China) Luo Honghao
(Germany) Lukas Kleckers	0–5	(England) Judd Trump

(Scotland) John Higgins	5–4	(England) Chris Wakelin
(Thailand) Noppon Saengkham	4–5	(China) Yuan Sijun
(England) Jack Lisowski	5–4	(England) Gary Wilson
(Northern Ireland) Jordan Brown	2–5	(Wales) Duane Jones
(China) Zhao Xintong	2–5	(China) Xiao Guodong
(Thailand) Sunny Akani	4–5	(Wales) Ryan Day
(Republic of Ireland) Fergal O'Brien	5–1	(China) Liang Wenbo
(England) Kuldesh Johal	2–5	(China) Ding Junhui
(Australia) Neil Robertson	5–2	(England) James Cahill
(England) Tom Ford	4–5	(Norway) Kurt Maflin
(England) Stuart Bingham	5–0	(China) Niu Zhuang
(England) Jimmy Robertson	5–1	(Northern Ireland) Joe Swail
(England) Craig Steadman	4–5	(England) David Gilbert
(England) Ben Woollaston	5–1	(England) Matthew Selt
(Scotland) Ross Muir	2–5	(England) Ricky Walden
(England) John Astley	1–5	(England) Mark Selby

== Century breaks ==
=== Main stage centuries ===
Total: 28

- 139, 120, 105 – David Gilbert
- 138, 129 – Duane Jones
- 137 – Fergal O'Brien
- 135 – Matthew Stevens
- 130 – Stuart Bingham
- 128 – Ding Junhui
- 127, 126, 120, 106 – Mark Selby
- 127 – Mark Williams
- 118 – Stephen Maguire
- 117 – Kyren Wilson
- 113 – Judd Trump
- 113 – Yan Bingtao
- 110, 104 – Neil Robertson
- 110 – Jack Lisowski
- 110 – Rory McLeod
- 109 – Peter Ebdon
- 105, 102, 102 – Xiao Guodong
- 105 – Li Hang
- 104 – Barry Hawkins

=== Qualifying stage centuries ===
Total: 80

- 147, 137, 114 – Judd Trump
- 145, 110 – Jack Lisowski
- 143, 118 – Barry Hawkins
- 137, 136, 131, 129, 124, 105, 103 – Shaun Murphy
- 137 – Li Hang
- 136, 119, 115, 111 – Matthew Stevens
- 136 – Chris Wakelin
- 136 – Zhou Yuelong
- 135, 119, 106, 103 – Mark Williams
- 135, 118, 102 – Neil Robertson
- 135 – Sam Craigie
- 135 – Anthony McGill
- 134 – Dominic Dale
- 133, 101 – David Gilbert
- 132, 130 – Graeme Dott
- 132 – Ashley Carty
- 129 – John Higgins
- 128 – Tom Ford
- 127, 108 – Duane Jones
- 127 – Jak Jones
- 125, 116 – Lu Ning
- 125 – Stuart Bingham
- 121 – Chen Feilong
- 120 – Gary Wilson
- 119, 107 – Liang Wenbo
- 117, 111, 100 – Robert Milkins
- 116, 102 – Ricky Walden
- 115, 104 – Joe Perry
- 112 – Craig Steadman
- 111 – Fergal O'Brien
- 109 – Jordan Brown
- 109 – Yuan Sijun
- 107 – Stephen Maguire
- 105 – Rory McLeod
- 104, 101 – Ding Junhui
- 104 – Stuart Carrington
- 104 – Zhang Anda
- 103 – Mei Xiwen
- 103 – Matthew Selt
- 103 – Robbie Williams
- 103 – Xiao Guodong
- 102 – Mark King
- 101, 100 – Peter Ebdon
- 101 – Eden Sharav
- 101 – Lee Walker
- 101 – Yan Bingtao
- 100, 100 – Mark Selby
- 100 – Marco Fu
- 100 – Gerard Greene
- 100 – Kurt Maflin
