= 2018 Masters (snooker) =

Professional non-ranking snooker tournament, Jan 2018

2018 Dafabet Masters
Tournament information
- Dates: 14–21 January 2018
- Venue: Alexandra Palace
- City: London
- Country: England
- Organisation: World Snooker
- Format: Non-ranking event
- Total prize fund: £600,000
- Winner's share: £200,000
- Highest break: Liang Wenbo (CHN) (139)

Final
- Champion: Mark Allen (NIR)
- Runner-up: Kyren Wilson (ENG)
- Score: 10–7

The 2018 Masters (officially the 2018 Dafabet Masters) was a professional non-ranking snooker tournament that took place between 14 and 21 January 2018 in London, England, and the second Triple Crown event of the 2017–18 snooker season. It was the 44th staging of the Masters, and was broadcast in Europe by the BBC and Eurosport.

The event saw two first-time Triple Crown finalists. Mark Allen won his first, defeating Kyren Wilson 10–7 in the final. Defending champion Ronnie O'Sullivan lost 1–6 in the quarter-finals to the eventual champion, Allen. It was O'Sullivan's first defeat at the Masters since 2015.

== Tournament summary ==
The 2018 Dafabet Masters saw the sixteen highest ranked players in the snooker world rankings compete, with no qualification round. Defending champion Ronnie O'Sullivan was the number one seed, with remaining places being allocated to players based on the world rankings after the 2017 UK Championship.

With Stuart Bingham, ranked 12th, suspended for betting breaches, (Note: On 24 October 2017, Bingham was found guilty of breaking World Professional Billiards and Snooker Association (WPBSA) rules on betting on matches involving himself and other players. He received a six month ban (of which, three months and one day were suspended) for betting breaches, and was also ordered to pay £20,000 in costs. The partial ban expired at the end of January 2018.) Liang Wenbo, ranked 17th, was invited in his stead. Luca Brecel and Anthony McGill made their Masters debuts at the event. A notable absentee was former Masters champion Neil Robertson, who had participated in every Masters tournament since 2006, but had failed to be ranked high enough in time for the event, at rank 20; Robertson would return to the event the following season.

As in previous years, the top eight seeds were allocated fixed positions in the draw. The other eight players were positioned by drawing lots during the final of the 2017 UK Championship.

=== First round ===
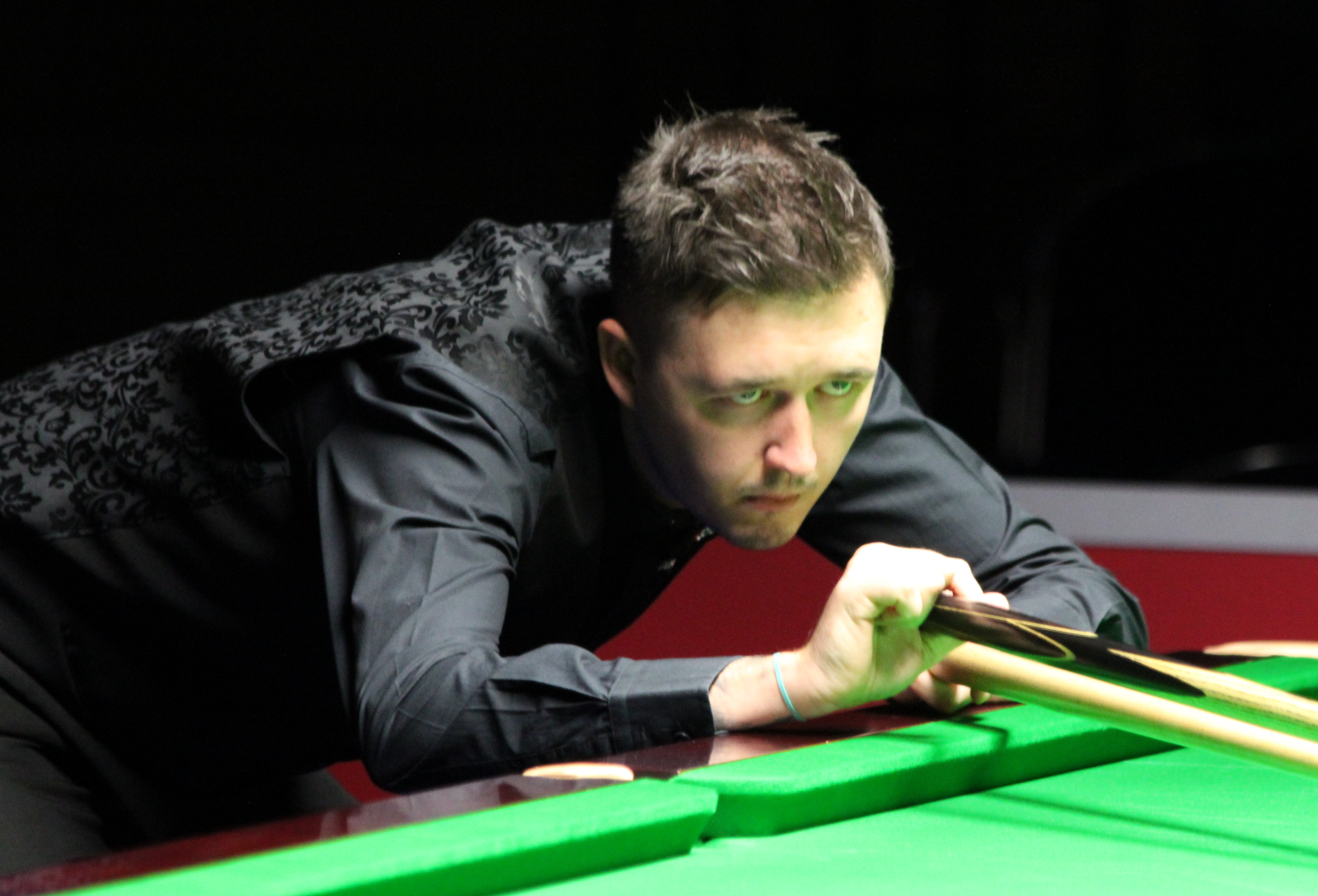
Kyren Wilson won his first match at the event, before reaching the final.

Sixteen players took part in the first round of the competition, which was played between 14 and 17 January 2018. Defending champion and top seed, Ronnie O'Sullivan, whitewashed ninth seed Marco Fu 6–0, making three centuries during the match. In the first four frames, O'Sullivan scored a total of 477 points without reply while Fu gained only five points due to a foul.

Mark Williams won a match at the Masters for the first time in five years, recovering from 3–5 behind to beat World Champion and World number one, Mark Selby, 6–5. Playing in his first Masters tournament in eight years, the other Welsh player in the draw, Ryan Day, came from 0–3 down to beat World number four and former champion, Ding Junhui, 6–4.

Shaun Murphy defeated Ali Carter 6–4. Murphy was leading 4–0 before Carter won the next four frames to level the match, but Murphy survived the comeback and won two more frames for victory. Former World Championship finalist, Judd Trump, defeated Liang Wenbo by a score of 6–4 in the first round.

Mark Allen safely reached the second round by defeating Masters debutant Luca Brecel 6–3. Kyren Wilson secured his first victory in a Masters match after having lost in the first round of his Masters debut the previous year. He defeated former Masters finalist, Barry Hawkins, 6–4 in the first round of this edition of the tournament. Former champion, John Higgins, won the first two frames in his tie against Anthony McGill, before McGill took the next four (including a match-high break of 122 in frame 4) to lead 4–2. Higgins, however, won the next four frames to win the match 6–4.

=== Quarter-finals ===
The quarter-finals were played on 18 and 19 January 2018. Defending champion Ronnie O'Sullivan was knocked out of the tournament by Mark Allen, who won their quarter-final match 6–1. Having suffered his first loss at the Masters since 2015, O'Sullivan claimed afterwards that he had been feeling ill before the match and was "glad" to be out of the competition. He also revealed, however, that he had not been feeling well during his whitewash of Marco Fu in the first round. After the match, Allen mentioned the negative crowd reaction, saying that his playing style had been affected by some of O'Sullivan's fans.

John Higgins defeated Ryan Day in the second quarter-final, with another 6–1 scoreline. Higgins made a break of 83 in the opening frame, Day won frame 2, then Higgins took the next five frames with breaks of 61, 63, 65, 80 and 113 to win the match. Kyren Wilson defeated Mark Williams, again 6–1, in the third quarter-final match. Wilson took the first four frames, Williams won the fifth, then Wilson took frames 6 and 7 with two century breaks to win the match.

In the last of the quarter-finals, Judd Trump defeated Shaun Murphy 6–4. Trump made four 50+ breaks in the first six frames and built up a lead of 4–2, before Murphy took the next two frames to tie the match 4–4. Trump then won the next two frames, with breaks of 111 and 113, to win the match. Play was briefly interrupted when a wasp landed on the table during the match. Afterwards, Murphy admitted that he had been concerned, saying he was "terrified of wasps, who isn't?"

=== Semi-finals ===
The semi-finals took place on 20 January 2018, the penultimate day of the event. In the first semi-final, Kyren Wilson defeated Judd Trump 6–5 to reach his first Triple Crown final. Trump started the match with a lead of 3–1, and later 5–2, owing to breaks of 83, 96 and 69. Wilson took both of the next two frames, and then made a break of 107 in the tenth frame to tie 5–5, forcing a decider. Trump was the first of the two players to make progress in the final frame, but lost position after a break of 23, leaving Wilson in amongst the balls; Wilson then made an "outstanding" break of 72 to win the match.

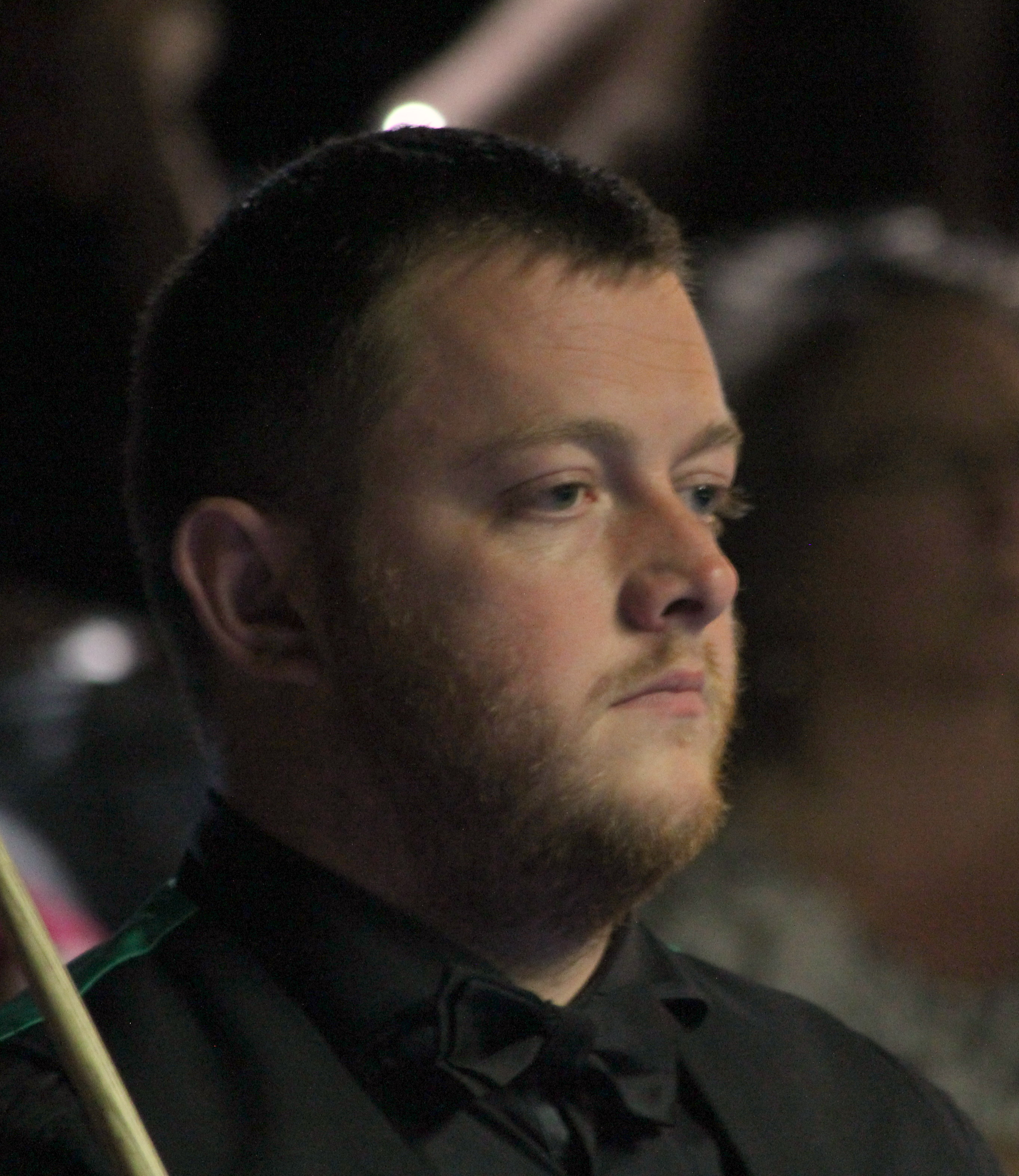
Mark Allen claimed the Masters title, winning his first Triple Crown event.

In the second semi-final, Mark Allen dispatched another former multiple World and Masters Champion, John Higgins, 6–3. After making breaks of 63 and 90, Allen took a 3–1 lead at the mid-session interval. Higgins created a break of 131 in the fifth frame (his 700th competitive century break), but Allen won the next two frames to lead 5–2. In frame 8, Higgins scored the second century of the match to trail 3–5, before Allen won the match in the ninth frame to reach his first Masters final. Post-match, Higgins admitted that his tactical play was "very poor".

=== Final ===
The final took place on 21 January 2018, over two sessions, in a best-of-19-frames match. This was the first time since 1995 that two first-time finalists had met in the Masters final; neither Mark Allen (8) nor Kyren Wilson (13) had ever previously reached the final of a Masters tournament. Allen defeated Wilson 10–7 to win the title. This was Allen's first major title in his fourteen years as a professional.

The two players ended the first session tied at 4–4, and shared the first two frames of the second session to tie the match again at 5–5. Allen made a break of 73 in the eleventh frame to lead 6–5; he then took a two-frame lead with a break of 119 in frame 12, and also won frame 13 to lead 8–5. Wilson won the next two frames to reduce his deficit to a single frame, at 7–8. Allen took frames 16 and 17, with breaks of 69 and 71 respectively, to win the tournament.

After the match, Wilson cried on receiving his runners-up medal. He commented: "I just made things a bit too easy for Mark, you can't do that to a player of Mark's class, he's too good and he'll punish you. That's what he did tonight."

== Prize fund ==
The event received identical prize money to that of the previous year, with £200,000 for the winner, and £600,000 overall. The highest break prize of £10,000 was won by Liang Wenbo, for a break of 139.

The breakdown of prize money is shown below:

- Winner: £200,000
- Runner-up: £90,000
- Semi-finals: £50,000
- Quarter-finals: £25,000
- Last 16: £12,500
- Highest break: £10,000
- Total: £600,000

== Tournament draw ==
Last 16; Best of 11 frames
1 | Ronnie O'Sullivan (ENG) | 6
9 | Marco Fu (HKG) | 0
8 | Mark Allen (NIR) | 6
11 | Luca Brecel (BEL) | 3
5 | John Higgins (SCO) | 6
14 | Anthony McGill (SCO) | 4
4 | Ding Junhui (CHN) | 4
15 | Ryan Day (WAL) | 6
3 | Judd Trump (ENG) | 6
16 | Liang Wenbo (CHN) | 4
6 | Shaun Murphy (ENG) | 6
12 | Ali Carter (ENG) | 4
7 | Barry Hawkins (ENG) | 4
13 | Kyren Wilson (ENG) | 6
2 | Mark Selby (ENG) | 5
10 | Mark Williams (WAL) | 6

Quarter-finals; Best of 11 frames
1 | (England) Ronnie O'Sullivan | 1
8 | (Northern Ireland) Mark Allen | 6
5 | (Scotland) John Higgins | 6
15 | (Wales) Ryan Day | 1
3 | (England) Judd Trump | 6
6 | (England) Shaun Murphy | 4
13 | (England) Kyren Wilson | 6
10 | (Wales) Mark Williams | 1

Semi-finals; Best of 11 frames
8 | (Northern Ireland) Mark Allen | 6
5 | (Scotland) John Higgins | 3
3 | (England) Judd Trump | 5
13 | (England) Kyren Wilson | 6

Final; Best of 19 frames
8 | (Northern Ireland) Mark Allen | 10
13 | (England) Kyren Wilson | 7

=== Final ===
Final: Best of 19 frames. Referee: Olivier Marteel. Alexandra Palace, London, England, 21 January 2018.
| Mark Allen (8); Northern Ireland | 10–7 | Kyren Wilson (13); England |
Afternoon: 39–80 (65), 82–22 (62), 50–63 (52), 58–49, 58–7, 6–86 (86), 1–105 (89), 75–52 (Wilson 52); Evening: 65–43, 23–92 (84), 79–0 (73), 119–0 (119), 84–1 (50), 0–98 (73), 49–73, 69–2 (69), 72–0 (71)
| 119 | Highest break | 89 |
| 1 | Century breaks | 0 |
| 6 | 50+ breaks | 7 |

== Century breaks ==
The event saw a total of 28 century breaks throughout the tournament, with Liang Wenbo completing the highest tournament break of 139.

- 139, 116 – Liang Wenbo
- 135, 120, 119, 115 – Mark Allen
- 135 – Mark Williams
- 131, 127, 113 – John Higgins
- 131, 120 – Barry Hawkins
- 125, 115, 105 – Ryan Day
- 122 – Anthony McGill
- 121, 120, 112 – Ronnie O'Sullivan
- 119 – Shaun Murphy
- 113, 111 – Judd Trump
- 111, 100 – Ding Junhui
- 110 – Ali Carter
- 109, 107, 106 – Kyren Wilson

== Coverage ==
The tournament was broadcast live in the United Kingdom by BBC Sport, as well as on Eurosport in Europe. Worldwide, the event was covered by China Central Television and Superstars Online in China, and Sky Sports in New Zealand. NowTV presented the event in Hong Kong with additional commentary.

=== Aftermath ===
The Masters was followed by the 2018 German Masters, which was won by Mark Williams. Masters winner Mark Allen was defeated in the first round, losing 4–5 to Matthew Selt. At the following year's event, the 2019 Masters, both finalists would lose in the first round: Mark Allen 5–6 to Luca Brecel, and Kyren Wilson 2–6 to Judd Trump.
