= 2026 Championship League (invitational) =

Invitational snooker tournament

2026 BetVictor Championship League Invitational

Tournament information
- Dates: 2 January – 11 February 2026
- Venue: Leicester Arena
- City: Leicester
- Country: England
- Organisation: Matchroom Sport
- Format: Non-ranking event
- Total prize fund: £205,000
- Winner's share: £10,000 (plus bonuses)
- Highest break: Chris Wakelin (ENG) (147); Matthew Selt (ENG) (147); Xiao Guodong (CHN) (147); Wu Yize (CHN) (147); Zhao Xintong (CHN) (147)

Final
- Champion: Mark Selby (ENG)
- Runner-up: Wu Yize (CHN)
- Score: 3–1

The 2026 Championship League Invitational (officially the 2026 BetVictor Championship League Snooker Invitational) was a professional non-ranking snooker tournament that took place from 2 January to 11 February 2026 at the Leicester Arena in Leicester, England. Part of the 2025–26 snooker season, it was the 20th edition of the invitational version of the tournament, which was first staged in 2008.

Mark Selby was the defending champion, having retained the title at the 2025 event by defeating Kyren Wilson 3‍–‍0 in the final. He won the title for a third consecutive time by defeating Wu Yize 3‍–‍1 in the final.

There were 173 century breaks made during the tournament, including five maximum breaks, made respectively by Chris Wakelin in his Group 1 match against Pang Junxu, Matthew Selt in his Group 4 match against Xiao Guodong, Xiao in his Group 6 match against Oliver Lines, Wu Yize in his Group 6 match against Lines, and Zhao Xintong in his Group 6 semi-final against Jak Jones. Wakelin, Selt, Wu, and Zhao all made their first maximums in professional competition, while Xiao made his third. They were the record‑extending 17th, 18th, 19th, 20th, and 21st maximums of the season.

== Overview ==
The tournament took place from 2 January to 11 February 2026 at the Leicester Arena in Leicester, England. Mark Selby was the defending champion, having defeated Kyren Wilson 3‍–‍0 in the final of the 2025 event.

=== Format ===
A total of 25 players were initially invited to the event, with the matches played behind closed doors without an audience. Players earn prize money for every frame won, as well as being semi‑finalists, runners‑up, and winners of each group, with more money involved in the Winners' Group. Since 2010, all matches have been played as the best of five frames.

The tournament was played in a round‑robin format, consisting of eight groups of seven players. The top four players in each group qualify for a play‑off, with the winner entering the Winners' Group. The bottom two players in each group were eliminated, and the remaining four moved to the next group, where they were joined by three more players. This format was played for each group, from one to seven. In each group, the players were ranked by the number of matches won, then by most frames won, and then by least frames lost. If two players were tied by these criteria, the player who won the match between them was ranked higher in the table. The group play‑off semi‑finals were contested between the 1st and 4th place players in the table, and between the 2nd and 3rd place players in the table. The Winners' Group was played at the end, and its play‑off winner became champion of the tournament.

Groups 1 to 4 were played from 2 to 9 January; Groups 5 to 7 were played from 19 to 24 January; and the Winners' Group was played on 10 and 11 February. The champion will take a place in the 2026 Champion of Champions.

=== Broadcasters ===
The event was broadcast by Eurasian Broadcasting in Ukraine and the Commonwealth of Independent States; Fox Sports in Australia; Nova Sport in Czechia and Slovakia; Rigour Media in China; PCCW in Hong Kong; Viaplay in Iceland and the Netherlands; Reddentes in Thailand; Sky NZ in New Zealand (on 10 and 11 February); TV3 in the Baltics; Viasat in Scandinavia; and by Matchroom.live in all other territories. Additionally, table one was streamed live on the Matchroom Pool YouTube channel available in the United Kingdom, with table two being available worldwide on the Matchroom Multi Sport YouTube channel.

=== Prize fund ===
The breakdown of prize money for the 2026 Championship League is as follows:

- Groups 1–7
  - Winner: £3,000
  - Runner-up: £2,000
  - Semi-final: £1,000
  - Frame-win (league stage): £100
  - Frame-win (play-offs): £300
  - Highest break: £500
- Winners' Group
  - Winner: £10,000
  - Runner-up: £5,000
  - Semi-final: £3,000
  - Frame-win (league stage): £200
  - Frame-win (play-offs): £300
  - Highest break: £1,000
- Maximum possible tournament total: £205,000 (if all match results are 3‍–‍2)
- Minimum possible tournament total: £152,800 (if all match results are 3‍–‍0)

== Group 1 ==
Group 1 was played on 2 and 3 January 2026. At the end of the first day Joe O'Connor and Jackson Page led the table, both with three wins out of four. Tom Ford won the group and qualified for the Winners' Group. Chris Wakelin made the first maximum break of his professional career in the first frame of his 3‍–‍2 league match win against Pang Junxu. It was the 17th maximum of the current season and the 234th official 147.

=== Group 1 league matches ===
==== 2 January ====
- Chris Wakelin 0–3 Elliot Slessor
- Joe O'Connor 3–1 Hossein Vafaei
- Chris Wakelin 1–3 Tom Ford
- Pang Junxu 2–3 Jackson Page
- Elliot Slessor 0–3 Joe O'Connor
- Hossein Vafaei 1–3 Jackson Page
- Pang Junxu 3–1 Tom Ford
- Chris Wakelin 3–2 Joe O'Connor
- Tom Ford 2–3 Jackson Page
- Elliot Slessor 3–0 Hossein Vafaei
- Chris Wakelin 3–2 Pang Junxu
- Joe O'Connor 3–1 Jackson Page

==== 3 January ====
- Elliot Slessor 2–3 Jackson Page
- Chris Wakelin 3–2 Hossein Vafaei
- Joe O'Connor 1–3 Pang Junxu
- Tom Ford 3–0 Hossein Vafaei
- Chris Wakelin 3–2 Jackson Page
- Elliot Slessor 1–3 Tom Ford
- Pang Junxu 2–3 Hossein Vafaei
- Joe O'Connor 3–2 Tom Ford
- Elliot Slessor 3–0 Pang Junxu

=== Group 1 table ===
Pos	Player	Pld	W	L	FF	FA	FD	
1	Joe O'Connor (ENG)	6	4	2	15	10	+5	Qualification to Group 1 play-off
2	Jackson Page (WAL)	6	4	2	15	13	+2	Qualification to Group 1 play-off
3	Chris Wakelin (ENG)	6	4	2	13	14	−1	Qualification to Group 1 play-off
4	Tom Ford (ENG) (W)	6	3	3	14	11	+3	Qualification to Group 1 play-off
5	Elliot Slessor (ENG)	6	3	3	12	9	+3	Advanced into Group 2
6	Pang Junxu (CHN)	6	2	4	12	14	−2	Eliminated from the competition
7	Hossein Vafaei (IRN)	6	1	5	7	17	−10	Eliminated from the competition

Source: Group 1 results from snooker.org and championshipleaguesnooker.co.uk
(W) Group winner

=== Group 1 play-offs ===
Semi-finals; Best of 5 frames
Joe O'Connor (ENG)	1
Tom Ford (ENG)	3
Jackson Page (WAL)	3
Chris Wakelin (ENG)	2

Final; Best of 5 frames
Tom Ford (ENG)	3
Jackson Page (WAL)	1

== Group 2 ==
Group 2 was played on 4 and 5 January 2026. Ali Carter withdrew and was replaced by Noppon Saengkham. At the end of the first day Gary Wilson led the table with three wins out of four. Elliot Slessor won the group and qualified for the Winners' Group. Slessor also made the highest break in the group, a 138.

=== Group 2 league matches ===
==== 4 January ====
- Elliot Slessor 3–0 Noppon Saengkham
- Gary Wilson 3–2 David Gilbert
- Joe O'Connor 3–1 Jackson Page
- Chris Wakelin 0–3 Gary Wilson
- David Gilbert 2–3 Noppon Saengkham
- Elliot Slessor 3–1 Joe O'Connor
- Chris Wakelin 3–1 Jackson Page
- Gary Wilson 2–3 Noppon Saengkham
- Elliot Slessor 0–3 David Gilbert
- Chris Wakelin 3–1 Joe O'Connor
- Joe O'Connor 3–2 Noppon Saengkham
- Gary Wilson 3–0 Jackson Page

==== 5 January ====
- David Gilbert 2–3 Joe O'Connor
- Gary Wilson 0–3 Elliot Slessor
- Jackson Page 0–3 Noppon Saengkham
- Chris Wakelin 1–3 Elliot Slessor
- Gary Wilson 3–2 Joe O'Connor
- Chris Wakelin 3–2 David Gilbert
- Elliot Slessor 0–3 Jackson Page
- David Gilbert 3–1 Jackson Page
- Chris Wakelin 1–3 Noppon Saengkham

=== Group 2 table ===
Pos	Player	Pld	W	L	FF	FA	FD	
1	Gary Wilson (ENG)	6	4	2	14	10	+4	Qualification to Group 2 play-off
2	Noppon Saengkham (THA)	6	4	2	14	11	+3	Qualification to Group 2 play-off
3	Elliot Slessor (ENG) (W)	6	4	2	12	8	+4	Qualification to Group 2 play-off
4	Joe O'Connor (ENG)	6	3	3	13	14	−1	Qualification to Group 2 play-off
5	Chris Wakelin (ENG)	6	3	3	11	13	−2	Advanced into Group 3
6	David Gilbert (ENG)	6	2	4	14	13	+1	Eliminated from the competition
7	Jackson Page (WAL)	6	1	5	6	15	−9	Eliminated from the competition

Source: Group 2 results from snooker.org and championshipleaguesnooker.co.uk
(W) Group winner

=== Group 2 play-offs ===
Semi-finals; Best of 5 frames
Gary Wilson (ENG)	3
Joe O'Connor (ENG)	1
Noppon Saengkham (THA)	0
Elliot Slessor (ENG)	3

Final; Best of 5 frames
Gary Wilson (ENG)	1
Elliot Slessor (ENG)	3

== Group 3 ==
Group 3 was played on 6 and 7 January 2026. Noppon Saengkham withdrew due to competing in the 2026 German Masters qualifying and was replaced by Antoni Kowalski. Si Jiahui won the group and qualified for the Winners' Group. Chris Wakelin made the highest break in the group, a 140.

=== Group 3 league matches ===
==== 6 January ====
- Xiao Guodong 3–0 Si Jiahui
- Chris Wakelin 1–3 Yuan Sijun
- Joe O'Connor 3–0 Antoni Kowalski
- Xiao Guodong 3–2 Gary Wilson
- Si Jiahui 1–3 Yuan Sijun
- Chris Wakelin 3–1 Antoni Kowalski
- Xiao Guodong 3–2 Yuan Sijun
- Gary Wilson 3–2 Joe O'Connor
- Chris Wakelin 2–3 Si Jiahui
- Gary Wilson 2–3 Antoni Kowalski
- Xiao Guodong 0–3 Joe O'Connor
- Yuan Sijun 3–2 Antoni Kowalski

==== 7 January ====
- Xiao Guodong 3–2 Chris Wakelin
- Si Jiahui 1–3 Antoni Kowalski
- Joe O'Connor 2–3 Yuan Sijun
- Chris Wakelin 3–2 Gary Wilson
- Si Jiahui 3–2 Gary Wilson
- Xiao Guodong 3–0 Antoni Kowalski
- Chris Wakelin 0–3 Joe O'Connor
- Gary Wilson 3–1 Yuan Sijun
- Si Jiahui 3–1 Joe O'Connor

=== Group 3 table ===
Pos	Player	Pld	W	L	FF	FA	FD	
1	Xiao Guodong (CHN)	6	5	1	15	9	+6	Qualification to Group 3 play-off
2	Yuan Sijun (CHN)	6	4	2	15	12	+3	Qualification to Group 3 play-off
3	Joe O'Connor (ENG)	6	3	3	14	9	+5	Qualification to Group 3 play-off
4	Si Jiahui (CHN) (W)	6	3	3	11	14	−3	Qualification to Group 3 play-off
5	Gary Wilson (ENG)	6	2	4	14	15	−1	Advanced into Group 4
6	Chris Wakelin (ENG)	6	2	4	11	15	−4	Eliminated from the competition
7	Antoni Kowalski (POL)	6	2	4	9	15	−6	Eliminated from the competition

Source: Group 3 results from snooker.org and championshipleaguesnooker.co.uk
(W) Group winner

=== Group 3 play-offs ===
Semi-finals; Best of 5 frames
Xiao Guodong (CHN)	2
Si Jiahui (CHN)	3
Yuan Sijun (CHN)	1
Joe O'Connor (ENG)	3

Final; Best of 5 frames
Si Jiahui (CHN)	3
Joe O'Connor (ENG)	2

== Group 4 ==
Group 4 was played on 8 and 9 January 2026. Joe O'Connor and Yuan Sijun both withdrew, due to competing in the 2026 German Masters qualifying. They were replaced by Ben Woollaston and Matthew Selt respectively. Selt won the group and qualified for the Winners' Group. Selt also made the first maximum break of his professional career in his league match loss to Xiao Guodong. It was the 18th maximum of the current season and the 235th official 147.

=== Group 4 league matches ===
==== 8 January ====
- Kyren Wilson 3–2 Zhao Xintong
- Neil Robertson 3–2 Gary Wilson
- Ben Woollaston 0–3 Matthew Selt
- Zhao Xintong 0–3 Xiao Guodong
- Neil Robertson 2–3 Matthew Selt
- Kyren Wilson 3–2 Gary Wilson
- Xiao Guodong 1–3 Ben Woollaston
- Zhao Xintong 3–2 Gary Wilson
- Kyren Wilson 2–3 Neil Robertson
- Xiao Guodong 3–2 Matthew Selt
- Zhao Xintong 3–1 Ben Woollaston
- Gary Wilson 3–1 Matthew Selt

==== 9 January ====
- Kyren Wilson 0–3 Matthew Selt
- Neil Robertson 3–2 Zhao Xintong
- Gary Wilson 3–0 Ben Woollaston
- Neil Robertson 2–3 Xiao Guodong
- Zhao Xintong 3–2 Matthew Selt
- Kyren Wilson 3–1 Xiao Guodong
- Neil Robertson 1–3 Ben Woollaston
- Xiao Guodong 3–0 Gary Wilson
- Kyren Wilson 3–1 Ben Woollaston

=== Group 4 table ===
Pos	Player	Pld	W	L	FF	FA	FD	
1	Xiao Guodong (CHN)	6	4	2	14	10	+4	Qualification to Group 4 play-off
2	Kyren Wilson (ENG)	6	4	2	14	12	+2	Qualification to Group 4 play-off
3	Matthew Selt (ENG) (W)	6	3	3	14	11	+3	Qualification to Group 4 play-off
4	Neil Robertson (AUS)	6	3	3	14	15	−1	Qualification to Group 4 play-off
5	Zhao Xintong (CHN)	6	3	3	13	14	−1	Advanced into Group 5
6	Gary Wilson (ENG)	6	2	4	12	13	−1	Eliminated from the competition
7	Ben Woollaston (ENG)	6	2	4	8	14	−6	Eliminated from the competition

Source: Group 4 results from snooker.org and championshipleaguesnooker.co.uk
(W) Group winner

=== Group 4 play-offs ===
Semi-finals; Best of 5 frames
Xiao Guodong (CHN)	2
Neil Robertson (AUS)	3
Kyren Wilson (ENG)	1
Matthew Selt (ENG)	3

Final; Best of 5 frames
Neil Robertson (AUS)	1
Matthew Selt (ENG)	3

== Group 5 ==
Group 5 was played on 19 and 20 January 2026. Kyren Wilson withdrew after playing in the final of the Masters the previous day. He was replaced by Oliver Lines. Mark Selby won the group and qualified for the Winners' Group. Wu Yize made the highest break in the group, a 143.

=== Group 5 league matches ===
==== 19 January ====
- Mark Selby 3–1 Xiao Guodong
- Zhao Xintong 3–2 Wu Yize
- Neil Robertson 0–3 Zhao Xintong
- Stuart Bingham 3–2 Oliver Lines
- Xiao Guodong 2–3 Wu Yize
- Mark Selby 3–1 Oliver Lines
- Zhao Xintong 3–1 Xiao Guodong
- Neil Robertson 1–3 Stuart Bingham
- Mark Selby 3–1 Wu Yize
- Neil Robertson 2–3 Oliver Lines
- Xiao Guodong 3–0 Oliver Lines
- Zhao Xintong 3–2 Stuart Bingham

==== 20 January ====
- Mark Selby 2–3 Zhao Xintong
- Wu Yize 1–3 Oliver Lines
- Neil Robertson 3–2 Mark Selby
- Xiao Guodong 3–1 Stuart Bingham
- Neil Robertson 2–3 Wu Yize
- Zhao Xintong 3–2 Oliver Lines
- Mark Selby 3–0 Stuart Bingham
- Neil Robertson 3–2 Xiao Guodong
- Wu Yize 3–1 Stuart Bingham

=== Group 5 table ===
Pos	Player	Pld	W	L	FF	FA	FD	
1	Zhao Xintong (CHN)	6	6	0	18	9	+9	Qualification to Group 5 play-off
2	Mark Selby (ENG) (W)	6	4	2	16	9	+7	Qualification to Group 5 play-off
3	Wu Yize (CHN)	6	3	3	13	14	−1	Qualification to Group 5 play-off
4	Xiao Guodong (CHN)	6	2	4	12	13	−1	Qualification to Group 5 play-off
5	Oliver Lines (ENG)	6	2	4	11	15	−4	Advanced into Group 6
6	Neil Robertson (AUS)	6	2	4	11	16	−5	Eliminated from the competition
7	Stuart Bingham (ENG)	6	2	4	10	15	−5	Eliminated from the competition

Source: Group 5 results from snooker.org and championshipleaguesnooker.co.uk
(W) Group winner

=== Group 5 play-offs ===
Semi-finals; Best of 5 frames
Zhao Xintong (CHN)	3
Xiao Guodong (CHN)	0
Mark Selby (ENG)	3
Wu Yize (CHN)	0

Final; Best of 5 frames
Zhao Xintong (CHN)	1
Mark Selby (ENG)	3

== Group 6 ==
Group 6 was played on 21 and 22 January 2026. Wu Yize won the group and qualified for the Winners' Group. Xiao Guodong made the third maximum break of his professional career in his league match loss to Oliver Lines. Wu Yize made the first maximum break of his professional career in his league match against Lines. Zhao Xintong made the first maximum break of his professional career in his semi-final match against Jak Jones. They were the 19th, 20th and 21st maximums of the current season and the 236th, 237th and 238th official maximums.

=== Group 6 league matches ===
==== 21 January ====
- Jack Lisowski 1–3 Zhang Anda
- Zhao Xintong 3–2 Jak Jones
- Xiao Guodong 2–3 Oliver Lines
- Wu Yize 3–1 Jack Lisowski
- Jak Jones 3–2 Zhang Anda
- Zhao Xintong 0–3 Xiao Guodong
- Jak Jones 1–3 Jack Lisowski
- Wu Yize 3–1 Oliver Lines
- Zhao Xintong 3–1 Zhang Anda
- Xiao Guodong 1–3 Wu Yize
- Xiao Guodong 1–3 Jak Jones
- Jack Lisowski 3–2 Oliver Lines

==== 22 January ====
- Xiao Guodong 0–3 Zhang Anda
- Zhao Xintong 3–1 Jack Lisowski
- Zhao Xintong 0–3 Wu Yize
- Jak Jones 3–2 Oliver Lines
- Wu Yize 3–2 Zhang Anda
- Xiao Guodong 3–2 Jack Lisowski
- Zhao Xintong 3–1 Oliver Lines
- Wu Yize 2–3 Jak Jones
- Zhang Anda 3–1 Oliver Lines

=== Group 6 table ===
Pos	Player	Pld	W	L	FF	FA	FD	
1	Wu Yize (CHN) (W)	6	5	1	17	8	+9	Qualification to Group 6 play-off
2	Jak Jones (WAL)	6	4	2	15	13	+2	Qualification to Group 6 play-off
3	Zhao Xintong (CHN)	6	4	2	12	11	+1	Qualification to Group 6 play-off
4	Zhang Anda (CHN)	6	3	3	14	11	+3	Qualification to Group 6 play-off
5	Jack Lisowski (ENG)	6	2	4	11	15	−4	Advanced into Group 7
6	Xiao Guodong (CHN)	6	2	4	10	14	−4	Eliminated from the competition
7	Oliver Lines (ENG)	6	1	5	10	17	−7	Eliminated from the competition

Source: Group 6 results from snooker.org and championshipleaguesnooker.co.uk
(W) Group winner

=== Group 6 play-offs ===
Semi-finals; Best of 5 frames
Wu Yize (CHN)	3
Zhang Anda (CHN)	0
Jak Jones (WAL)	0
Zhao Xintong (CHN)	3

Final; Best of 5 frames
Wu Yize (CHN)	3
Zhao Xintong (CHN)	1

== Group 7 ==
Group 7 was played on 23 and 24 January 2026. Zhou Yuelong and Zhao Xintong both withdrew and were replaced by Ryan Day and Xu Si respectively. Zhang Anda won the group and qualified for the Winners' Group. Zhang made the highest break in the group, a 140.

=== Group 7 league matches ===
==== 23 January ====
- Zhang Anda 1–3 Lei Peifan
- Jack Lisowski 3–1 Ryan Day
- Jimmy Robertson 1–3 Xu Si
- Jak Jones 3–0 Ryan Day
- Zhang Anda 3–0 Xu Si
- Jack Lisowski 3–0 Lei Peifan
- Jak Jones 2–3 Jimmy Robertson
- Lei Peifan 0–3 Ryan Day
- Jak Jones 2–3 Xu Si
- Jack Lisowski 0–3 Zhang Anda
- Lei Peifan 3–2 Xu Si
- Jimmy Robertson 1–3 Ryan Day

==== 24 January ====
- Zhang Anda 3–1 Ryan Day
- Jack Lisowski 3–2 Xu Si
- Jak Jones 3–2 Zhang Anda
- Lei Peifan 1–3 Jimmy Robertson
- Jak Jones 1–3 Jack Lisowski
- Ryan Day 1–3 Xu Si
- Zhang Anda 1–3 Jimmy Robertson
- Jak Jones 1–3 Lei Peifan
- Jack Lisowski 1–3 Jimmy Robertson

=== Group 7 table ===
Pos	Player	Pld	W	L	FF	FA	FD	
1	Jimmy Robertson (ENG)	6	4	2	14	11	+3	Qualification to Group 7 play-off
2	Jack Lisowski (ENG)	6	4	2	13	10	+3	Qualification to Group 7 play-off
3	Zhang Anda (CHN) (W)	6	3	3	13	10	+3	Qualification to Group 7 play-off
4	Xu Si (CHN)	6	3	3	13	13	0	Qualification to Group 7 play-off
5	Lei Peifan (CHN)	6	3	3	10	13	−3	Eliminated from the competition
6	Jak Jones (WAL)	6	2	4	12	14	−2	Eliminated from the competition
7	Ryan Day (WAL)	6	2	4	9	13	−4	Eliminated from the competition

Source: Group 7 results from snooker.org and championshipleaguesnooker.co.uk
(W) Group winner

=== Group 7 play-offs ===
Semi-finals; Best of 5 frames
Jimmy Robertson (ENG)	0
Xu Si (CHN)	3
Jack Lisowski (ENG)	2
Zhang Anda (CHN)	3

Final; Best of 5 frames
Xu Si (CHN)	1
Zhang Anda (CHN)	3

== Winners' Group ==
The Winners' Group was played on 10 and 11 February 2026. Mark Selby won the group and the tournament. Wu Yize made the highest break in the group, a 146.

=== Winners' Group league matches ===
==== 10 February ====
- Si Jiahui 3–1 Matthew Selt
- Mark Selby 1–3 Tom Ford
- Wu Yize 3–1 Zhang Anda
- Si Jiahui 2–3 Elliot Slessor
- Elliot Slessor 1–3 Tom Ford
- Mark Selby 3–2 Matthew Selt
- Zhang Anda 3–1 Tom Ford
- Mark Selby 3–2 Wu Yize
- Mark Selby 3–1 Si Jiahui
- Elliot Slessor 3–1 Matthew Selt
- Wu Yize 2–3 Tom Ford
- Elliot Slessor 3–2 Zhang Anda

==== 11 February ====
- Wu Yize 0–3 Elliot Slessor
- Mark Selby 3–0 Zhang Anda
- Si Jiahui 3–2 Zhang Anda
- Tom Ford 1–3 Matthew Selt
- Wu Yize 3–2 Si Jiahui
- Mark Selby 1–3 Elliot Slessor
- Zhang Anda 1–3 Matthew Selt
- Wu Yize 3–1 Matthew Selt
- Si Jiahui 3–1 Tom Ford

=== Winners' Group table ===
Pos	Player	Pld	W	L	FF	FA	FD	
1	Elliot Slessor (ENG)	6	5	1	16	9	+7	Qualification to Winners' Group play-off
2	Mark Selby (ENG) (W)	6	4	2	14	11	+3	Qualification to Winners' Group play-off
3	Si Jiahui (CHN)	6	3	3	14	13	+1	Qualification to Winners' Group play-off
4	Wu Yize (CHN)	6	3	3	13	13	0	Qualification to Winners' Group play-off
5	Tom Ford (ENG)	6	3	3	12	13	−1	Eliminated from the competition
6	Matthew Selt (ENG)	6	2	4	11	14	−3	Eliminated from the competition
7	Zhang Anda (CHN)	6	1	5	9	16	−7	Eliminated from the competition

Source: Winners' Group results from snooker.org and championshipleaguesnooker.co.uk
(W) Group winner

=== Winners' Group play-offs ===
Semi-finals; Best of 5 frames
Elliot Slessor (ENG)	2
Wu Yize (CHN)	3
Mark Selby (ENG)	3
Si Jiahui (CHN)	0

Final; Best of 5 frames
Wu Yize (CHN)	1
Mark Selby (ENG)	3

== Final ==
Final: Best of 5 frames. Referee: Andrew Barklam; Leicester Arena, Leicester, England, 11 February 2026.
Wu Yize; China	1–3	Mark Selby; England
Frame scores: 1–70, 0–128 (128), 81–45, 0–92
(frame 3) 69	Highest break	128 (frame 2)
0	Century breaks	1

== Century breaks ==
A total of 173 (Note: Number of century breaks for each group: Group 1: 14; Group 2: 14; Group 3: 27; Group 4: 22; Group 5: 23; Group 6: 34; Group 7: 18; Winners' Group: 21.) (Note: Players who made nine or more centuries: Wu Yize: 14; Zhang Anda: 14; Mark Selby: 14; Joe O'Connor: 14; Xiao Guodong: 13; Zhao Xintong: 11; Gary Wilson: 11; Jak Jones: 9.) century breaks were made during the tournament. These included five maximum breaks.

- **147** (6), **146** (W), **143** (5), 130, 127, 121, 119, 108, 107, 104, 104, 101, 101, 100 – Wu Yize
- **147** (6), 140, 137, 127, 124, 124, 115, 113, 111, 110, 107 – Zhao Xintong
- **147** (1), **140** (3), 130, 126, 108 – Chris Wakelin
- **147** (6), 136, 134, 134, 131, 128, 121, 118, 110, 107, 105, 101, 100 – Xiao Guodong
- **147** (4), 133, 122, 121, 116, 109, 104 – Matthew Selt
- 143, **140** (7), 137, 133, 130, 130, 127, 120, 116, 115, 111, 104, 101, 100 – Zhang Anda
- 139, 135, 129, 126, 108, 103 – Tom Ford
- **138** (2), 138, 128, 108 – Elliot Slessor
- 137, 137, 134, 131, 130, 128, 123, 123, 122, 122, 109, 106, 104, 101 – Mark Selby
- 137, 134, 120, 119, 117, 105, 103, 102, 100, 100, 100 – Gary Wilson
- 137, 122, 110, 106 – Si Jiahui
- 136, 134, 133, 102, 100 – Oliver Lines
- 135, 129, 111 – David Gilbert
- 134, 134, 131, 130, 124, 120, 108 – Neil Robertson
- 134, 134, 121, 118 – Jimmy Robertson
- 133, 129, 127 – Kyren Wilson
- 132, 130, 112 – Yuan Sijun
- 131, 120, 115, 108, 107, 104, 104, 103, 101 – Jak Jones
- 129, 126, 125, 123, 123, 121, 118, 106, 106, 103, 102, 101, 100, 100 – Joe O'Connor
- 127, 102 – Antoni Kowalski
- 121, 106 – Xu Si
- 121 – Hossein Vafaei
- 118, 101 – Ben Woollaston
- 114, 103, 101, 101, 101, 100 – Jack Lisowski
- 113 – Lei Peifan
- 108, 106, 102 – Jackson Page
- 107, 102 – Pang Junxu
- 106 – Ryan Day
- 104 – Noppon Saengkham
- 101 – Stuart Bingham

Note: Bold = highest break in the indicated group.

== Winnings ==
No.	Player (Note: Table updated at end of play on 11 February.)	1	2	3	4	5	6	7	W	Total
1	Mark Selby (ENG) (6)					6,400			14,600	21,000
2	Wu Yize (CHN) (13)					**2,800**	**6,667**		**9,800**	19,267
3	Elliot Slessor (ENG) (20)	1,200	**6,500**						6,800	14,500
4	Si Jiahui (CHN) (16)			5,900					5,800	11,700
5	Zhao Xintong (CHN) (9)				1,300	5,000	**4,567**			10,867
6	Zhang Anda (CHN) (23)						2,400	**6,600**	1,800	10,800
7	Joe O'Connor (ENG) (26)	2,800	2,600	4,900						10,300
8	Xiao Guodong (CHN) (11)			3,100	3,000	2,200	**1,167**			9,467
9	Matthew Selt (ENG) (37)				**6,700**				2,200	8,900
10	Tom Ford (ENG) (28)	6,200							2,400	8,600
11	Gary Wilson (ENG) (17)		4,600	1,400	1,200					7,200
12	Chris Wakelin (ENG) (14)	**3,400**	1,100	**1,600**						6,100
13	Neil Robertson (AUS) (3)				4,600	1,100				5,700
14	Jackson Page (WAL) (33)	4,700	600							5,300
15	Xu Si (CHN) (39)							4,500		4,500
16	Jack Lisowski (ENG) (22)						1,100	2,900		4,000
17	Jak Jones (WAL) (19)						2,500	1,200		3,700
18	Yuan Sijun (CHN) (31)			2,800						2,800
19	Kyren Wilson (ENG) (2)				2,700					2,700
20	Noppon Saengkham (THA) (38)		2,400							2,400
=	Jimmy Robertson (ENG) (34)							2,400		2,400
22	Oliver Lines (ENG) (58)					1,100	1,000			2,100
23	David Gilbert (ENG) (24)		1,400							1,400
24	Pang Junxu (CHN) (27)	1,200								1,200
25	Stuart Bingham (ENG) (18)					1,000				1,000
=	Lei Peifan (CHN) (29)							1,000		1,000
27	Ryan Day (WAL) (35)							900		900
=	Antoni Kowalski (POL) (72)			900						900
29	Ben Woollaston (ENG) (36)				800					800
30	Hossein Vafaei (IRN) (32)	700								700
	Total prize money:	20,200	19,200	20,600	20,300	19,600	19,400	19,500	43,400	182,200

Green: Won the Group.
Bold: Highest break in the Group.
Numbers in parentheses: World ranking prior to tournament start, 2 January 2026.
All prize money in GBP. (Note: Source (championshipleaguesnooker.co.uk) does not always include high-break prize money in totals.)
