= 1992 Matchroom League =

Forte Hotels Matchroom League
Tournament information
- Dates: 12 January – 31 May 1992
- Organisation: Matchroom Sport
- Format: Non-ranking event
- Winner's share: £50,000
- Highest break: (England) John Parrott (147) (Scotland) Stephen Hendry (147)

Final
- Champion: (Scotland) Stephen Hendry
- Runner-up: (England) Steve Davis
- Score: 9–2

The 1992 Forte Hotels Matchroom League was a professional non-ranking snooker tournament that was played from 12 January to 31 May 1992.

Stephen Hendry won in the final 9–2 against Steve Davis. Two maximum breaks were achieved during this tournament; the first was by John Parrott in his match with Tony Meo; while the second was recorded by Stephen Hendry against Willie Thorne.

== League phase ==
Ranking		(Scotland) HEN	(England) DAV	(Thailand) WAT	(England) WHI	(England) PAR	(England) FOU	(England) THO	(England) WIL	(Malta) DRA	(England) JAM	(England) MEO	(England) FIS	(England) HAL	Frame W-L	Match W-D-L	Pld-Pts
1	Stephen Hendry	x	6	3	3	5	6	4	4	6	6	5	6	7	61–35	8–2–2	12–26
2	Steve Davis	2	x	6	3	6	5	4	4	5	3	5	6	6	55–41	7–2–3	12–23
3	James Wattana	5	2	x	6	4	4	3	4	2	6	6	6	6	54–42	6–3–3	12–21
4	Jimmy White	5	5	2	x	5	4	4	5	3	4	1	6	5	49–47	6–3–3	12–21
5	John Parrott	3	2	4	3	x	4	8	5	5	6	5	6	3	54–42	6–2–4	12–20
6	Neal Foulds	2	3	4	4	4	x	7	2	5	5	7	3	5	51–45	5–3–4	12–18
7	Tony Drago	2	3	6	5	3	3	6	2	x	5	6	2	4	47–49	5–1–6	12–16
8	Gary Wilkinson	4	4	4	3	3	6	4	x	6	3	3	6	4	50–46	3–5–4	12–14
9	Steve James	2	5	2	4	2	3	4	5	3	x	3	7	6	46–50	4–2–6	12–14
10	Willie Thorne	4	4	5	4	0	1	x	4	2	4	4	5	6	43–53	3–6–3	12–12
11	Tony Meo	3	3	2	7	3	1	4	5	2	5	x	4	3	42–54	3–2–7	12–11
12	Allison Fisher	2	2	2	2	2	5	3	2	6	1	4	x	5	36–60	3–1–8	12–10
13	Mike Hallett	1	2	2	3	5	3	2	4	4	2	5	3	x	36–60	2–2–8	12–8

Top four qualified for the play-offs. If points were level then most frames won determined their positions. If two players had an identical record then the result in their match determined their positions. If that ended 4–4 then the player who got to four first was higher.

- 12 January The Plaza, Exeter
  - Stephen Hendry 5–3 John Parrott
  - James Wattana 4–4 Gary Wilkinson
- 12 January Terry Griffiths Matchroom, Llanelli
  - Tony Drago 6–2 Willie Thorne
  - Neal Foulds 5–3 Steve James
- 19 January – English Riviera Centre, Torquay
  - Stephen Hendry 6–2 Steve James
  - James Wattana 6–2 Mike Hallett
- 18 or 19 January – Matchroom Snooker Complex, Plympton, Plymouth
  - Gary Wilkinson 6–2 Neal Foulds
  - Tony Meo 7–1 Jimmy White
- 1 February – Roebuck Hotel, Buckhurst Hill
  - Steve Davis 6–2 Allison Fisher
- 1 February – Spencer's Snooker Club, Stirling
  - Willie Thorne 5–3 James Wattana
- 2 February – Aylesbury Civic Centre, Aylesbury
  - Steve Davis 6–2 John Parrott
  - Tony Drago 5–3 Steve James
- 2 February – Spencer's Snooker Club, Stirling
  - Neal Foulds 7–1 Tony Meo
  - James Wattana 6–2 Steve James
- 16 February – Meadowside Centre, Burton on Trent
  - Jimmy White 5–3 Steve Davis
  - Mike Hallett 4–4 Tony Drago
- 16 February – New Bath Hotel, Matlock Bath, Matlock
  - Jimmy White 6–2 Allison Fisher
- 1 March – Thornaby Pavilion, Thornaby-on-Tees
  - John Parrott 5–3 Tony Drago
  - Steve Davis 6–2 Mike Hallett
- 1 March – Matchroom Snooker Complex, Plympton, Plymouth
  - Tony Meo 4–4 Willie Thorne
  - Stephen Hendry 6–2 Neal Foulds
- 8 March – Warwick Arts Centre, Coventry
  - Jimmy White 5–3 John Parrott
  - James Wattana 5–3 Stephen Hendry
- 8 March – Terry Griffiths Matchroom Club, Llanelli
  - Neal Foulds 5–3 Tony Drago
  - Steve Davis 5–3 Tony Meo
- 8 March – Matchroom Snooker Centre, Plympton, Plymouth
  - Gary Wilkinson 4–4 Willie Thorne
- 7 March – Leamington Spa
  - Gary Wilkinson 6–2 Allison Fisher
- 14 March – St Helens or 11 April
  - Allison Fisher 4–4 Tony Meo
  - Gary Wilkinson 4–4 Stephen Hendry
- 15 March – Sands Centre Carlisle
  - Mike Hallett 4–4 Gary Wilkinson
  - Tony Drago 5–3 Jimmy White
- 15 March – Royal Hampshire Snooker Lodge, Aldershot
  - Steve Davis 5–3 Neal Foulds
  - Tony Meo 5–3 Steve James
- 21 March – Forte Posthouse, Erskine
  - Steve James 7–1 Allison Fisher
- 21 March – Royal Hampshire Snooker Lodge, Aldershot
  - Stephen Hendry 5–3 Tony Meo
- 22 March – Glasgow Royal Concert Hall, Glasgow
  - Stephen Hendry 6–2 Steve Davis
  - John Parrott 5–3 Gary Wilkinson
- 22 March – Royal Hampshire Snooker Lodge, Aldershot
  - Jimmy White 4–4 Willie Thorne
  - Neal Foulds 5–3 Mike Hallett
- 28 March – Forte Crest Hotel, Basildon
  - Stephen Hendry 6–2 Allison Fisher
- 28 March – The Hawth, Crawley
  - Allison Fisher 5–3 Neal Foulds
  - Steve Davis 4–4 Gary Wilkinson
- 29 March – The Hawth, Crawley
  - Jimmy White 5–3 Stephen Hendry
  - Steve James 6–2 Mike Hallett
- 12 April – Woodford Leisure Centre, Hull
  - James Wattana 6–2 Tony Meo
  - Neal Foulds 4–4 John Parrott
- 11 April – Ritz Snooker Club, Redhill
  - Tony Drago 6–2 Tony Meo
  - John Parrott 8–0 Willie Thorne
- 11 April – Bawtry
  - James Wattana 6–2 Allison Fisher
- 12 April – The Dome, Doncaster
  - Steve James 5–3 Gary Wilkinson
  - Steve Davis 5–3 Tony Drago
  - Jimmy White 5–3 Mike Hallett
- 9 May – Brighton Centre, Brighton
  - Allison Fisher 5–3 Mike Hallett
  - Tony Drago 6–2 James Wattana
- 9 May – Royal Hampshire Snooker Lodge, Aldershot
  - John Parrott 5–3 Tony Meo
    - Parrot makes 147 break on 4th frame.
  - Willie Thorne 6–2 Mike Hallett
- 10 May – Brighton Centre, Brighton
  - James Wattana 4–4 John Parrott
  - Steve James 4–4 Jimmy White
- 10 May – Royal Hampshire Snooker Lodge, Aldershot
  - Willie Thorne 4–4 Steve Davis
- 16 May – The Dome, Doncaster
  - Steve James 4–4 Willie Thorne
  - James Wattana 4–4 Neal Foulds
- 16 May – Forte Hotels, Runcorn
  - John Parrott 6–2 Allison Fisher
- 17 May – Oval Sports Centre, Bebington
  - Mike Hallett 5–3 John Parrott
  - Steve James 5–3 Steve Davis
- 17 May – Southport
  - James Wattana 6–2 Jimmy White
  - Stephen Hendry 6–2 Tony Drago
- 17 May – The Dome, Doncaster
  - Tony Meo 5–3 Gary Wilkinson
  - Neal Foulds 7–1 Willie Thorne
- 20 May – Queen's Theatre, Burslem, Stoke on Trent
  - Stephen Hendry 7–1 Mike Hallett
  - Jimmy White 5–3 Gary Wilkinson
- 23 May – Bloomsbury Crest, London
  - Allison Fisher 6–2 Tony Drago
  - John Parrott 6–2 Steve James
- 24 May – Derngate, Northampton
  - Steve Davis 6–2 James Wattana
  - Jimmy White 4–4 Neal Foulds
- 24 May – Rhondda Sports Centre, Ystrad
  - Mike Hallett 5–3 Tony Meo
  - Stephen Hendry 4–4 Willie Thorne
    - Hendry makes 147 break on 8th frame.
- 24 May – Norwich Sports Village, Norwich
  - Gary Wilkinson 6–2 Tony Drago
- 28 May – Ilford Snooker Centre, Ilford
  - Willie Thorne 5–3 Allison Fisher

== Play-offs ==
30–31 May (Bournemouth International Centre, Bournemouth, England)

Semi-finals; Best of 17 frames
1	(Scotland) Stephen Hendry	9
4	(England) Jimmy White	0
2	(England) Steve Davis	9
3	(Thailand) James Wattana	5

Final; Best of 17 frames
1	(Scotland) Stephen Hendry	9
2	(England) Steve Davis	2
Third-place (Best of 17 frames)
3	(Thailand) James Wattana	9
4	(England) Jimmy White	7
