= Celtic and Irish Cultural Society =

Cultural society in southeast England

The Celtic and Irish Cultural Society promotes and supports awareness of Irish and Celtic culture in Crawley, West Sussex and throughout the southeast of England.

The Celtic and Irish Cultural Society organise a number of events in Crawley including the Crawley Irish Festival, the Crawley Saint Patrick's Festivities and the Crawley Fleadh. In addition to community events, the society supports community groups within the southeast of England by providing free webhosting and marketing.

Formally established in January 2004, the Celtic and Irish Cultural Society developed from the organising committee of the Crawley Irish Festival and set out to establish additional events including the first Crawley Saint Patrick's Parade in March 2004 and the first Crawley Fleadh in August 2004 as an extension to the Crawley Irish Festival. In 2006, the Fleadh moved to November as a stand-alone event.

The society is supported by Crawley Borough Council, part funded by West Sussex County Council, the Irish Government Dion Fund and sponsored by a number of business sponsors.

== Crawley Saint Patrick's festivities ==
Saint Patrick's Festivities

The Saint Patrick's celebrations in Crawley are celebrated annually during March. Several events take place throughout Crawley celebrating Ireland's national day of celebration. The 2007 event is expected to strengthen the format already established.

From 2006, building on the success of the 2004 and 2005 Weekend, the Celtic and Irish Cultural Society with assistance from Crawley Borough Borough and the Hawth Theatre, organised the third annual event which covered two weekends to move closer to a week-long festival.

The lineup includes a Saint Patrick's Parade, concerts, free dance and music displays at the centre of the town plus much more.

== Crawley Celtic Weekend: Celtic Rock in the Park / Crawley Irish Festival ==
Crawley's Irish Festival has seen a major from 2006 with a new event added to the August Bank Holiday Weekend.

The Celtic Rock in the Park open air evening concert - aimed at a younger audience. The first planned concert included the bands Limehouse Lizzy and Emerald Dogs and focused on modern world music with an Irish edge and Celtic Rock.

The additions to the Crawley Irish Festival include a dedicated Irish dance stage and the traditional stage will see a large increase in bands, as a result. Children's Entertainment has also been added with children's theatre and magic shows. The Crawley Irish Festival attracts around 10,000 people each year.

Collectively, both the Celtic Rock in the Park and Crawley Irish Festival will be referred to as the Crawley Celtic Weekend from 2006.

== Crawley Fleadh ==
The Crawley Fleadh is a celebration of Irish culture taking place during November in and around Crawley, West Sussex. The Fleadh brings qualified Irish sports (GAA) coaches into local primary and secondary schools for the first time in Crawley's history: it will give children the opportunity to play Gaelic Football and Hurling. Arts and literature will also be catered for with storytelling and much more. For adults, Irish language classes, set dancing classes and theatre. Plus there are plenty of activities for the whole family including Irish dance shows and live music.

== Additional events ==
The Celtic and Irish Cultural Society organises a number of additional events throughout the year including Irish language classes and music gigs at local venues.
