= 2025 Championship League =

2025 Championship League may refer to:

- 2025 Championship League (invitational), a snooker tournament held between January and February 2025
- 2025 Championship League (ranking), a snooker tournament held between June and July 2025
