= Century break =

Achievement in snooker

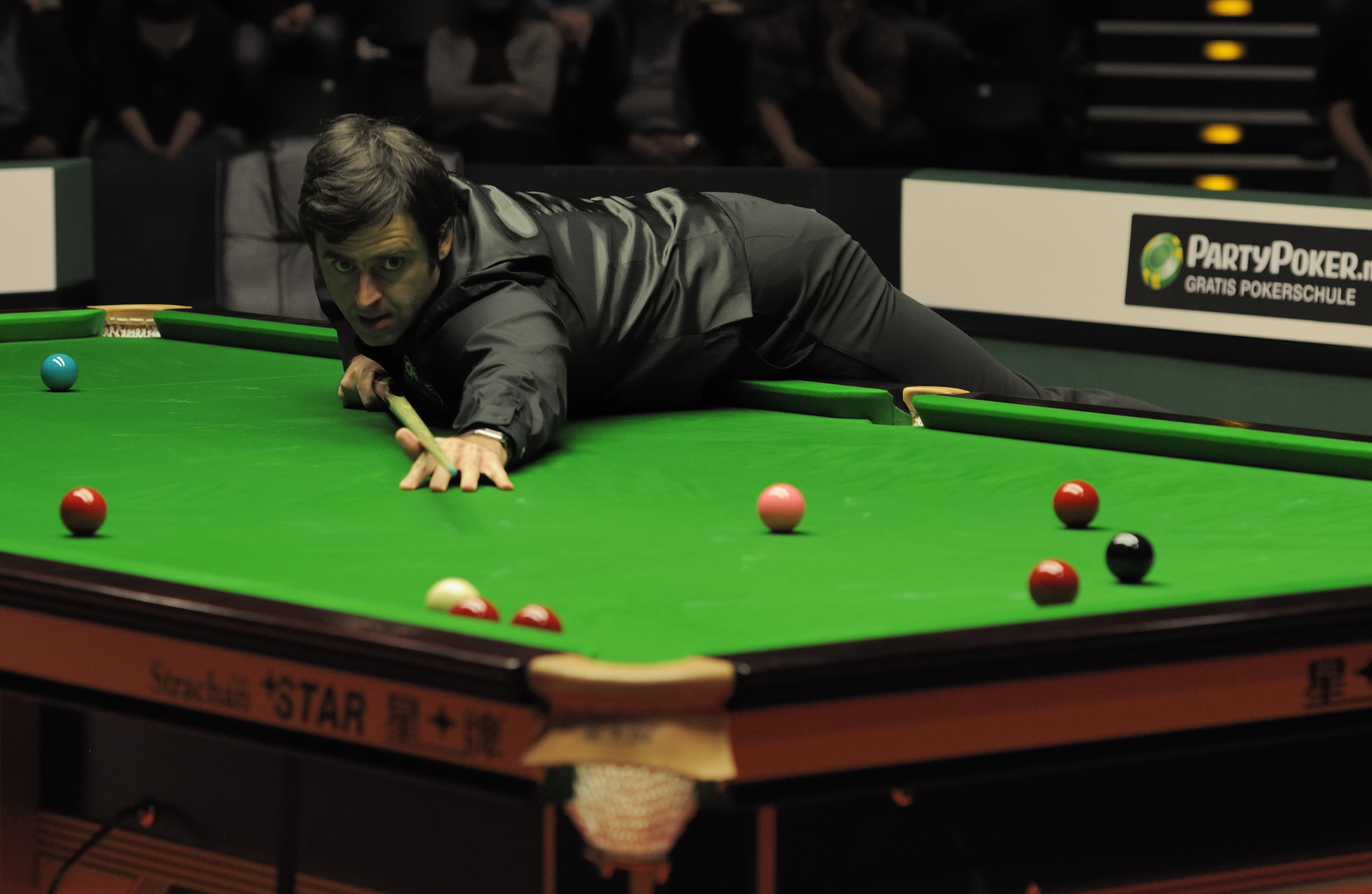
Ronnie O'Sullivan (pictured in 2012) has scored the most century breaks in professional snooker tournaments at more than 1,300.

In snooker, a century break (also century, sometimes called a ton) is a break of 100 points or more, compiled in one visit to the table. A century break requires potting at least 25 consecutive balls, and the ability to score centuries is regarded as a mark of the highest skill in snooker. Ronnie O'Sullivan has described a player's first century break as the "ultimate milestone for any snooker player". Joe Davis made the first televised century break in 1962.

O'Sullivan holds the record for the most career centuries in professional competition, with more than 1,300. Four players have reached the milestone of 1,000 career century breaks: O'Sullivan attained it at the 2019 Players Championship, followed by John Higgins at the 2024 English Open, Judd Trump at the 2024 British Open and Neil Robertson during qualifying for the 2025 International Championship. Overall, 15 players have surpassed 500 career centuries in professional competition. Trump holds the record for the most century breaks in a single season, having made 107 in the 2024–25 season. He and Robertson, who made 103 centuries in the 2013–14 season, are the only players to have achieved 100 or more century breaks in one season; Trump is the only player to have accomplished the feat twice, having previously achieved it in the 2019–20 season, when he made 102 centuries. The most centuries by a player in a professional match is seven, a record held jointly by Stephen Hendry, Ding Junhui and Trump. Tony Drago made the fastest recorded century in tournament play at the 1996 UK Championship, when he took 3 minutes and 31 seconds to score 100 points.

== Rules ==
Snooker table with balls placed in their starting positions

A century break is a score of 100 points or more within one visit to the table. The player does this by potting red balls and coloured balls alternately, where the coloured balls are repositioned on their starting locations. After repositioning the coloured ball paired to the last red on the table, the six coloured balls are potted in order of their increasing value. Because a break is defined as series of consecutive pots by a player during a single frame, scoring 100 points over the course of a whole frame does not necessarily constitute a century break, as it must be done on a single turn at the table. Points for a foul shot by the opponent do not count in a player's break.

Under normal circumstances, the highest possible century in snooker is 147 (a "maximum break"), composed of 15 reds (one point each), 15 blacks (seven points each) and the six remaining colours; yellow, green, brown, blue, pink and black potted consecutively (two through seven points each for a total of 27). If for example only the least-valued colour (yellow, two points) would be used instead of the black ball, the break value would only be 72 points. This means that only a single century break is possible in a frame of snooker under a limited number of combinations, but it requires the potting of at least 25 consecutive balls (10 x (1 + 7) + 2 + 3 + 4 + 5 + 6 = 100). To score one, there must be at least ten reds on the table when the player comes to play since if there are only nine reds left, only 99 (= 9 × (1 + 7) + 27) points may be scored. An exception exists if the opponent fouls and leaves the incoming player snookered on all the remaining reds. In such a situation, the player can nominate one of the other colours as a red, known as a "free ball", which carries the same value as a red for just that shot; therefore, a century break is still possible with only nine reds left.

Breaks above 147 are possible (up to 155) when an opponent fouls and leaves a free ball with all fifteen reds still remaining on the table, creating a situation identical to as if there were 16 red balls on the table; this has happened twice in professional competition. Jamie Burnett made a 148 at the qualifying stage of the 2004 UK Championship. O'Sullivan had a 153 break in his quarter-final match at the 2026 World Open.

A "century of centuries" refers to a total of 100 breaks of at least 100 points each. By December 2001, only 15 players had reached this milestone in professional snooker tournaments. With the increased occurrence of centuries compiled in professional competition in the past decades, another 27 players had achieved a "century of centuries" by October 2011, bringing the total to 42. By the end of the 2013–14 season, the total number of players reaching the 100 centuries threshold had increased to 52. In October 2018, there were 66 players that had reached the 100 century breaks marker. As of 1 November 2026, there are 94 players with 100 or more career centuries.

== Players with 500 or more ==
As of 11 September 2026, the following 15 players are reported to have made 500 or more confirmed century breaks in professional competition.

Threshold	Player	Date threshold reached	Tournament
1,300	Ronnie O'Sullivan (ENG) (Note: O'Sullivan current total = 1,339 (as of 13 November 2026))	16 August 2025	2025 Saudi Arabia Masters
1,100	Judd Trump (ENG) (Note: Trump current total = 1,169 (as of 13 November 2026))	16 September 2025	2025 English Open
1,000	John Higgins (SCO) (Note: Higgins current total = 1,077 (as of 13 November 2026))	19 September 2024	2024 English Open
1,000	Neil Robertson (AUS) (Note: Robertson current total = 1,055 (as of 13 November 2026))	30 September 2025	2025 International Championship (Q)
900	Mark Selby (ENG) (Note: Selby current total = 981 (as of 13 November 2026))	13 August 2025	2025 Saudi Arabia Masters
700	Stephen Hendry (SCO) (777^{†})	30 January 2007	2007 Malta Cup
700	Shaun Murphy (ENG) (Note: Murphy current total = 797 (as of 13 November 2026))	24 February 2025	2025 World Open
700	Ding Junhui (CHN) (Note: Ding current total = 738 (as of 13 November 2026))	29 July 2025	2025 Shanghai Masters
700	Mark Allen (NIR) (Note: Allen current total = 704 (as of 13 November 2026))	28 April 2026	2026 World Championship
700	Mark Williams (WAL) (Note: Williams current total = 710 (as of 13 November 2026))	11 September 2026	2026 English Open
600	Stuart Bingham (ENG) (Note: Bingham current total = 631 (as of 13 November 2026))	10 January 2025	2025 Championship League
500	Marco Fu (HKG) (Note: Fu current total = 572 (as of 13 November 2026))	12 December 2019	2019 Scottish Open
500	Stephen Maguire (SCO) (Note: Maguire current total = 551 (as of 13 November 2026))	20 October 2023	2023 Northern Ireland Open (Q)
500	Kyren Wilson (ENG) (Note: Wilson current total = 586 (as of 13 November 2026))	11 February 2025	2025 Welsh Open
500	Barry Hawkins (ENG) (Note: Hawkins current total = 534 (as of 13 November 2026))	28 July 2025	2025 Shanghai Masters

Key
^{†}	Exact total for a retired player.

== Records ==
=== Career ===
- Joe Davis compiled the first televised century break in 1962.
- The record for the most century breaks scored in official tournament play has been held by Ronnie O'Sullivan since January 2015, when he broke the record of 775 career centuries previously held by Stephen Hendry.
- The first player to have recorded 1,000 centuries in public performance was Horace Lindrum, who reached this number in March 1970 in Sydney. O'Sullivan, Higgins, Trump and Robertson are the only players to have compiled more than 1,000 century breaks in professional competition. O'Sullivan was the first to do so, having achieved his 1,000th century at the 2019 Players Championship on 10 March 2019.
- Stacey Hillyard became the first female player to record a competitive century in January 1985.
- The fastest recorded century break in tournament play was by Tony Drago at the 1996 UK Championship – he took 3 minutes 31 seconds (211 seconds) to score one hundred points. During the 2022 Scottish Open, Ronnie O'Sullivan came three seconds shy of Drago's record with a century break in 3 minutes 34 seconds (214 seconds).
- The youngest player to record a witnessed century break is Michael White, who scored his first century in March 2001 at the age of nine.

=== Season ===
- Hendry was the first player to reach 50 century breaks in a season, compiling 53 in the 1994–95 season. He again exceeded 50 centuries in the 1995–96 season, with 51, and O'Sullivan came close with 48 in the 2006–07 season.
- Hendry's record was broken in the 2010–11 season by Mark Selby with 54 centuries, and again by Selby with 55 century breaks in the 2011–12 season. The record was broken for a third successive season in 2012–13 when Judd Trump compiled 61 centuries.
- The first player to reach the "century of centuries" (100 century breaks) mark during a single season is Neil Robertson, who compiled his 100th century of the 2013–14 season on 30 April 2014 during his quarter-final match against Judd Trump at the 2014 World Championship. In total, Robertson compiled 103 century breaks throughout the season, and in doing so broke Trump's record from the previous season. Trump matched the feat in the curtailed 2019–20 season, compiling 102 century breaks in total.
- Robertson's record was broken in the 2024–25 season by Judd Trump with 107 centuries.

=== Event ===
- The most centuries made by a player in a single match during a professional tournament is seven and the record is shared by Stephen Hendry, Ding Junhui and Judd Trump.
  - Hendry set the record during the final of the 1994 UK Championship. During this match, Hendry compiled six centuries in a span of eight frames.
  - Ding tied the record in his semi-final match at the 2016 World Championship. This is also a record for a match at the Crucible Theatre, beating the previous record of six shared by Mark Selby and Ronnie O'Sullivan.
  - Trump tied the record in the final at the 2019 World Championship. This equalled Ding's record at the Crucible Theatre and Hendry's record for a final. It also set a new record for a World Championship final at the Crucible, surpassing O'Sullivan's tally of six centuries during the final of the 2013 World Championship.
  - Selby's six-century haul in a second round match at the 2011 World Championship set the record for a best-of-25 match.
  - O'Sullivan holds the record for making the most centuries in a best-of-9 match, compiling five centuries (including a 147) to beat Ali Carter 5–2 at the 2007 Northern Ireland Trophy.
  - Fergal O'Brien holds the record for most centuries in a best-of-11 match, compiling five centuries to beat Barry Hawkins 6–5 at the 2016 UK Championship.
- The record for combined number of century breaks in a single match by both players is eleven, achieved by Judd Trump (seven) and John Higgins (four) in the final of the 2019 World Championship. This broke the previous record of ten, achieved by Ding Junhui (seven) and Alan McManus (three) in their semi-final tie at the 2016 World Championship.
- The most century breaks made by a player in a ranking event is 18 by Ding during the 2016 World Championship, compiling three during qualifying and a further 15 at the Crucible Theatre during the main event. Hendry previously set a record of 16 at the 2002 World Championship, which remains a televised, Crucible and venue record. Mark Williams tied Hendry's records twenty years later at the 2022 World Championship.
- The most century breaks made by a player in a tournament is 32, made by Jak Jones at the non‑ranking 2025 Championship League.
- O'Sullivan has compiled more century breaks than any other player in the World Championship competition at the Crucible Theatre. He broke Hendry's record of 127 centuries at the 2013 Championship, extending his total to 200 at the 2023 Championship. John Higgins is the only other player besides Hendry and O'Sullivan to compile more than 100 centuries at the world championship in the Crucible era.
- An aggregate Crucible record of 109 centuries was set at the 2022 World Championship, breaking the previous record of 108 in 2021. The only other time the 100-century threshold has been breached was at the 2019 world championship, with 100.
- The most centuries made at a single event is the 177 made at the non‑ranking 2025 Championship League.

=== Consecutive ===
- The record for the most consecutive centuries in a match by a pair of players is shared by Kyren Wilson and Anthony Hamilton who compiled six between them at a qualifier for the China Open on 11 February 2016. Wilson (4 centuries) beat Hamilton (2) 5 frames to 3. The previous record of five centuries was jointly held by O'Sullivan and Hendry at the final of the 2003 British Open and by Stephen Maguire and Robertson in a quarter-final at the 2009 Masters.
- Stephen Maguire made five consecutive centuries at the 2004 British Open, comprising the last three frames of his quarter-final and the first two frames of the semi-final.
- Nine players have made four consecutive centuries in a match:
  - John Higgins in the final of the 2005 Grand Prix
  - Shaun Murphy at the 2007 Welsh Open
  - Neil Robertson twice, first at the 2013 Ruhr Open, and then again at the 2022 European Masters to become the first player to do the feat twice.
  - Gary Wilson at the 2019 UK Championship,
  - Stephen Maguire in the first round of the 2020 Tour Championship,
  - Mark Allen at the 2020 European Masters and again at the 2023 English Open this time in a best-of-seven match
  - Lu Ning in the 2020 UK Championship
  - Jack Lisowski at the 2022 UK Championship.
  - Chang Bingyu in the 2026 Welsh Open

Of these, Neil Robertson (in 2013), Mark Allen (in 2023) and Chang Bingyu (in 2026) are the only times this has been done to inflict 4‍–‍0 best‑of‑7 whitewashes. Chang Bingyu's feat was achieved as part of his "perfect match" where he recorded a 100% pot success.
