= Maximum break =

Highest single score in the cue sport snooker

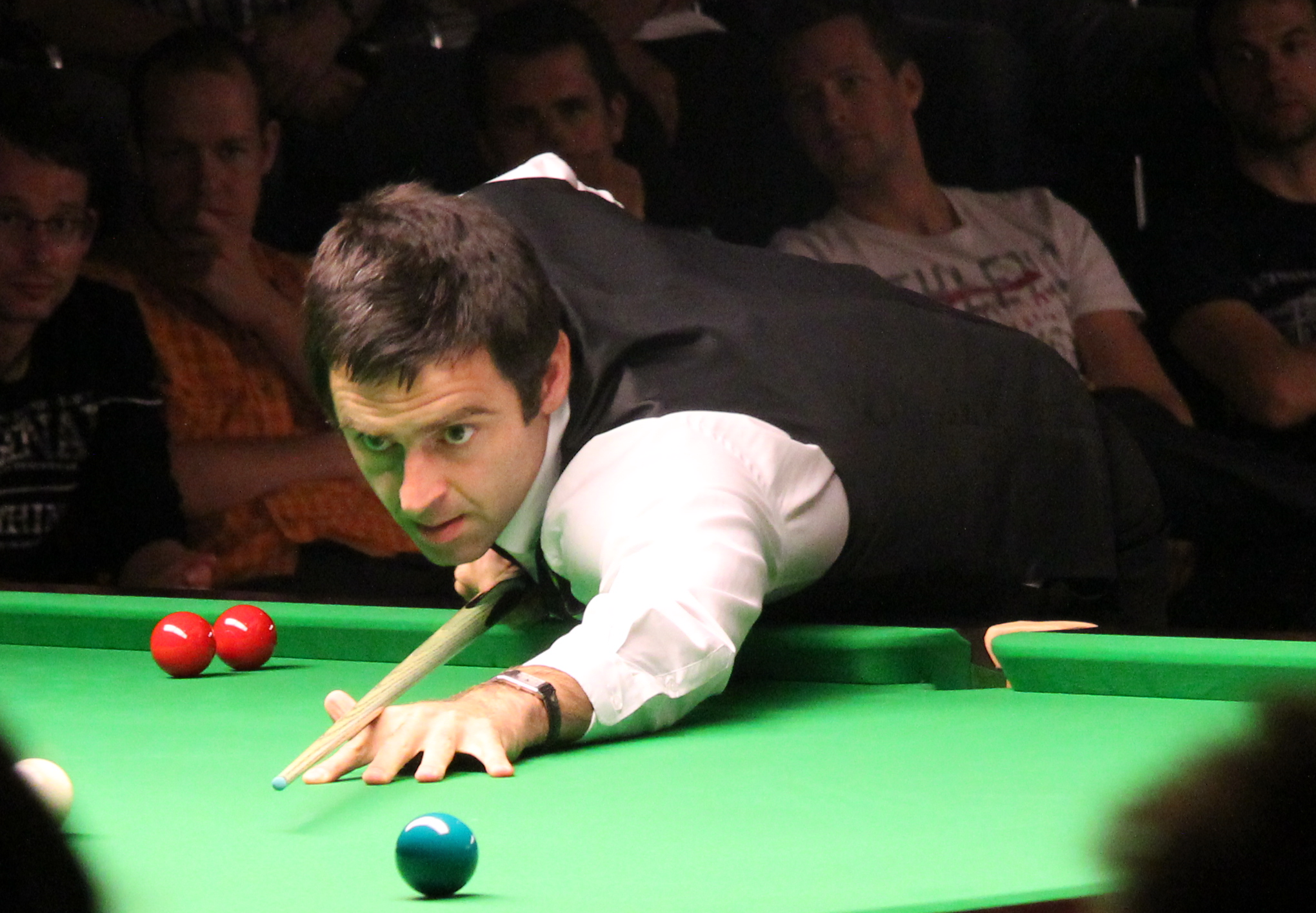
Ronnie O'Sullivan has made a record 17 maximum breaks in professional competition.

A maximum break (also known as a maximum or a 147, conventionally pronounced one‑four‑seven) is the highest possible break in snooker under normal circumstances. It is a special form of total clearance in which a player pots all 15 reds with 15 blacks for 120 points, followed by all six colours for a further 27 points. It is regarded as a major achievement, comparable to a nine‑dart finish in darts or a hole‑in‑one in golf. A break of up to 155 is possible if a free ball is awarded before any reds have been potted, but breaks above 147 have occurred only twice in professional competition.

Joe Davis made the first officially recognised maximum break in a 1955 exhibition match. Steve Davis made the first professional and first televised maximum at the 1982 Classic. The following year, Cliff Thorburn compiled the first maximum in the history of the World Snooker Championship. During the 2025 World Championship qualifiers, Jackson Page became the first player to achieve two maximums in the same professional match. Ronnie O'Sullivan holds the record for the most official maximums in professional competition, with 17. He also holds the Guinness World Record for the fastest competitive maximum, made in 5 minutes and 8 seconds at the 1997 World Championship.

Maximum breaks have become increasingly commonplace. Just eight officially recognised professional maximums were made in the 1980s, followed by 26 in the 1990s, 35 in the 2000s, and 86 in the 2010s. As of the 2027 German Masters qualifying, 93 official maximums have been made thus far in the 2020s, for a cumulative total of 248 in professional snooker history. The 2025–26 season produced a record 24 maximums. Large prizes for maximum breaks, first introduced in the 1980s, have since been withdrawn, although some tournaments, including the World Championship, still offer bonuses.

== History ==
Joe Davis compiled the first officially recognised maximum break on 22 January 1955, in a match against Willie Smith at Leicester Square Hall, London. The Billiards Association and Control Council initially refused to accept the break since the match was not played under their rules. At the time, the professional game used a rule (now standard, see rules of snooker) whereby, after a foul, a player could compel the offender to play the next stroke. It was not until a meeting on 20 March 1957 that the break was officially recognised and Davis was presented with a certificate to commemorate his achievement. The match between Davis and Smith was played as part of a series of events marking the closure of Leicester Square Hall; known as Thurston's Hall until 1947, the venue had hosted many important billiards and snooker matches since its opening in 1901, including twelve World Snooker Championship finals. John Spencer compiled a maximum break in the 1979 Holsten Lager International, but it did not count as an official maximum, however, as the break was made on a non‑templated table used during the event. The first official maximum break in professional competition was compiled by Steve Davis in the 1982 Classic at the Queen Elizabeth Hall in Oldham, against John Spencer. This was also the first televised maximum break. For his achievement, Davis won a Lada car provided by the event's sponsors. The following year, Cliff Thorburn became the first player to make a maximum at the World Championship in the fourth frame of his second round match against Terry Griffiths.

Before the 1994‍–‍95 season, the maximum break remained a rare feat, with only 15 official maximums compiled altogether. However, beginning in the 1994‍–‍95 season, at least one maximum break has been achieved every season thereafter. There were 13 maximums scored in each of the 2016‍–‍17, 2022‍–‍23 and 2023‍–‍24 seasons. This was the highest number until the 2024‍–‍25 season, during which 15 maximums were made. The record was broken again in the 2025‍–‍26 season which produced 24 maximums.

Mark Selby made the 100th officially recognised maximum break in professional competition on 7 December 2013 in the seventh frame of his semi‑final match against Ricky Walden at the UK Championship. As of 19 November 2026, 248 official maximum breaks have been recorded in professional competition, with the 200th being made by Joe O'Connor at the 2024 Championship League. Ronnie O'Sullivan has compiled 17 official competitive maximum breaks, the most achieved by any professional player. Following him are John Higgins with 13, Stephen Hendry with 11, Shaun Murphy with 10, Stuart Bingham and Judd Trump with 9, Thepchaiya Un-Nooh with 8, and Ding Junhui with 7.

On 30 April 2023, Selby made a maximum break in the 16th frame during the 2023 World Championship final against Luca Brecel, the first achieved in a World Championship final. On 7 December 2023, Murphy made a maximum break in his first‑round match against Bulcsú Révész in the 2023 Shoot Out, the first ever compiled at the Shoot Out, which is played under a variation of snooker rules, with a shot clock and fouls awarding ball in hand. On 5 October 2024, in his winning run in event 3, Zhao Xintong made the first ever maximum break on the Q Tour, the secondary snooker tour that serves as a qualification route to the main professional tour, in his 4‍–‍1 win over Shaun Liu.

At least nine players have missed the final black on a score of 140: Robin Hull, Ken Doherty, Barry Pinches, Mark Selby, Michael White, Thepchaiya Un-Nooh (twice in the 2015‍–‍16 season and once in the 2024‍–‍25 season), Liang Wenbo in a qualifying match at the 2018 World Championship, after he had already made a maximum earlier in the same match, and both Joe O'Connor and Jack Lisowski at the 2025 Championship League. Xu Si missed the last black in a maximum attempt at the 2026 China Open qualifying.

Breaks above 147 are possible when an opponent fouls and leaves a free ball with all 15 reds still remaining on the table. A break greater than 147 has happened only twice in professional competition, first when Jamie Burnett made a break of 148 at the qualifying stage of the 2004 UK Championship., and second when Ronnie O'Sullivan surpassed Burnett's long-standing record in his quarter-final match against Ryan Day at the 2026 World Open with a 153 break. Jamie Cope compiled a break of 155 points, the highest possible free‑ball break, during practice in 2005. Alex Higgins is said by some players to have attained the same feat.

== Records ==
=== First maximums ===
The first known maximum break in practice was made by Murt O'Donoghue at Griffith, Australian Capital Territory, Australia, on 26 September 1934. Joe Davis compiled the first official 147 against Willie Smith in an exhibition match on 22 January 1955 at Leicester Square Hall, London. Rex Williams made the first maximum break in a competitive match against Manuel Francisco, Professionals v. Amateurs, on 23 December 1965 in Cape Town.

John Spencer made the first maximum compiled in professional competition on 13 January 1979 at the Holsten Lager Tournament against Cliff Thorburn, but it was not officially ratified due to oversized pockets. The break was not caught on video as the television crew were away on a tea break. The first official maximum break in professional competition was made by Steve Davis in the 1982 Lada Classic against Spencer. This was also the first televised 147. Thorburn became the first player to make a maximum break at the World Snooker Championship, achieved in 1983 during his second-round match against Terry Griffiths.

Thorburn made a second competitive maximum break in March 1989, becoming the first player to make two maximum breaks in competition. In November 1995, Hendry made his second televised maximum break, becoming the first player to have made two 147s on television. In March 2019, Mink Nutcharut made a 147 during a practice match at the Hi-End Snooker Club in Thailand. She is believed to be the only woman to have made a maximum break, either in practice or in competition.

=== World Snooker Championship maximums ===
There have been 15 maximums made at the main stage of the World Championship—staged at the Crucible Theatre in Sheffield, England—by 11 different players. Thorburn made the first, followed by Jimmy White, Stephen Hendry (three times), Ronnie O'Sullivan (three times), Mark Williams, Ali Carter, John Higgins, Neil Robertson, Kyren Wilson, Mark Selby and Mark Allen. Another eight maximums have been made during World Championship qualifying matches, by six players: Robert Milkins (twice), Gary Wilson, Liang Wenbo, Graeme Dott, Noppon Saengkham and Jackson Page (twice in the same match).

=== Multiple maximums ===
More than one official maximum break has been compiled in the same event on more than twenty occasions. The first tournament with more than one maximum break was the 1992 Matchroom League, in which John Parrott and Stephen Hendry each made a 147 break. The first time that two maximum breaks were made in the same ranking tournament was at the 1999 British Open, where Jason Prince made one during qualifying and Graeme Dott at the main event. This was repeated at the 2000 Scottish Open, with Stephen Maguire in qualifying and Ronnie O'Sullivan at the main event. The 2008 World Snooker Championship was the first event where two maximum breaks (by O'Sullivan and Carter) were televised. Two maximum breaks (by Neil Robertson and Noppon Saengkham) were also televised at the 2019 Welsh Open.

Three official maximums at the same professional tournament have been achieved six times. The first was at the 2012 UK Championship, when Andy Hicks and Jack Lisowski both compiled one each in qualifying and John Higgins compiled one in the televised stages. The second time was at the 2017 German Masters, where Ali Carter and Ross Muir both compiled one each during qualifying and Tom Ford during the televised stages. The third time was at the 2024 Championship League by Kyren Wilson in Group 3, by John Higgins in Group 5, and by Joe O'Connor in Group 7. The fourth time was at the 2025 Championship League by Jak Jones in Group 2, by David Gilbert in Group 7, and by Mark Selby in the Winners' Group. The fifth time was at the 2025 Saudi Arabia Snooker Masters, with Thepchaiya Un-Nooh compiling one in his third-round match, and O'Sullivan making a brace in the semi-final. The sixth time was at the 2025 Xi'an Grand Prix, where Zhou Yuelong made one in qualifying, and both Judd Trump and Aaron Hill made maximums at the main stage.

Five official maximums at the same event has been achieved once at the 2026 Championship League by Chris Wakelin, Matthew Selt, Xiao Guodong, Wu Yize, and Zhao Xintong.

The 2012 FFB Snooker Open, 2017 German Masters, 2018 Paul Hunter Classic, 2025 Saudi Arabia Snooker Masters, 2025 Xi'an Grand Prix, and 2026 Championship League are the only events where two maximums were made on the same day.

Mark Davis, Jackson Page and Ronnie O'Sullivan are the only players to make two official maximum breaks in professional competition at the same event. Mark Davis became the first player to do so, when he compiled two 147s at the 2017 Championship League. In the third round of the qualifying stage for the 2025 World Championship, Jackson Page made two maximums in his 10‍–‍2 win over Allan Taylor, with the first in the eighth frame on 13 April 2025 and the second in the twelfth frame the following day. This made him the first player to make two maximums in a professional competitive match. On 15 August 2025, in his 6‍–‍3 win over Chris Wakelin in the semi-finals of the 2025 Saudi Arabia Snooker Masters, Ronnie O'Sullivan made maximums in the first and seventh frames of the match, becoming the only player to make two maximums in a one-session match or on the same day.

There have been several noteworthy instances of multiple maximum breaks outside of sanctioned professional competition. Peter Ebdon is said to have compiled two maximum breaks during an 11‑frame exhibition match at Eastbourne Police Club on 15 April 1996, and in 2003 he also compiled two consecutive maximum breaks against Steve Davis in an exhibition match. In 2009 Jimmy White and Ronnie O'Sullivan compiled consecutive maximum breaks at an exhibition match in Ireland, and later in the same year Mark King and Joe Jogia are said to have replicated the feat at the Grove Open. The only known instance of more than two maximum breaks being compiled at a single event on the same day is during the Buckley's Bitter Challenge; three 147s were compiled on 8 February 1998, by Matthew Stevens, Ryan Day and Tony Chappel, but were not officially ratified. The only player known to have made more than two maximum breaks on a single occasion is Adrian Gunnell, who compiled three maximums in four frames at a club in Telford in 2003 while practising against Ian Duffy.

John Higgins, Ronnie O'Sullivan and Thepchaiya Un-Nooh are the only players to record maximum breaks in consecutive ranking events. Higgins made maximums at the LG Cup and the British Open in 2003, O'Sullivan at the Northern Ireland Trophy and another at the UK Championship in 2007, and Un-Nooh at the Saudi Arabia Snooker Masters and Wuhan Open in 2025.

=== Deciding frames and tournament finals ===
Only ten maximums have been made in final‑frame deciders. These are: Hendry's at the 1997 Charity Challenge, O'Sullivan's at the 2007 UK Championship, both of Mark Davis's at the 2017 Championship League, Martin Gould's at the 2018 Championship League, Ford's at the 2019 English Open, both Day's and John Higgins's at the 2020 Championship League, Marco Fu's at the 2022 Hong Kong Masters, and Shaun Murphy's at the 2023 Snooker Shoot Out.

Hendry, John Higgins, Bingham, O'Sullivan, Murphy, Robertson, Judd Trump, Selby, Zhang Anda, and Un-Nooh have made maximums in finals of tournaments. Hendry has made three: the first at the 1997 Charity Challenge, the second at the 1999 British Open and the third at the 2001 Malta Grand Prix. Higgins at the 2003 LG Cup and at the 2012 Shanghai Masters, Bingham at the 2012 Wuxi Classic, O'Sullivan at the 2014 Welsh Open, Murphy at the 2014 Ruhr Open, Robertson at the 2015 UK Championship, Trump at the 2022 Turkish Masters and the 2022 Champion of Champions, Zhang at the 2023 International Championship, and Un-Nooh at the 2026 World Open. Selby made a maximum in the 2023 World Championship final, becoming the first player to do so at that stage of the tournament. Selby's and Robertson's maximums are the only ones compiled in the finals of Triple Crown events.

=== Fastest ===
O'Sullivan's 147 break in the first‑round match against Mick Price at the 1997 World Championship holds the record for the fastest maximum in the history of the game. For many years Guinness World Records recorded the time of the break at 5 minutes and 20 seconds. However an investigation undertaken by Deadspin in 2017 revealed that the time recorded by Guinness was incorrect because the timer was started too early on the BBC footage. Breaks are not officially timed in snooker and the official rules of snooker do not specify how they should be timed, instead leaving the timing to the discretion of the broadcaster. The only timing methodology World Snooker sanctions in its events is the one employed in shot clock events where timing for a player's shot begins when the balls have come to rest from his opponent's previous shot. Under this convention the break would have been timed at 5 minutes and 15 seconds. World Snooker has since suggested that a break starts when the player strikes the cueball for the first time in a break which would result in a time of 5 minutes and 8 seconds; this is the time that both World Snooker and Guinness World Records now officially acknowledge.

=== Youngest and oldest ===
The youngest player to have made an officially recognised maximum break in professional competition is Thanawat Thirapongpaiboon, who compiled a 147 at the 2010 Rhein‍–‍Main Masters aged 16 years and 312 days. Sean Maddocks is recognised by Guinness World Records as the youngest player to make a maximum break in any recognised competition. Maddocks was 15 years and 90 days old when he achieved the feat at the LiteTask Pro‑Am series in Leeds on 9 July 2017. Judd Trump is known to have made a 147 at the Potters Under‑16 Tournament in 2004 at the age of 14 years and 206 days; however, this break is not recognised by Guinness World Records. The youngest player to have made a televised maximum is Ding Junhui, who was aged 19 years and 288 days when he achieved a 147 at the 2007 Masters.

The oldest player to have made a maximum in professional competition is Ronnie O'Sullivan, who made two 147 breaks in his 2025 Saudi Arabia Snooker Masters semi-final against Chris Wakelin, when he was aged 49 years and 253 days. Former professional Darren Morgan made a maximum break in an amateur Seniors event in 2023 at the age of 56 years and 261 days; this possibly makes him the oldest player to achieve a maximum break in competition.

== Prize money ==
In professional tournaments, a 147 break traditionally carried a substantial prize; for example, Ronnie O'Sullivan was awarded £165,000 for his maximum break at the 1997 World Championship. That prize was composed of £147,000 for making the 147 break and £18,000 for achieving the highest break of the tournament.

In the 2011‍–‍12 season World Snooker introduced a roll‑over system for the maximum break prize money, the "rolling 147 prize". A maximum break earned £5,000 during the televised stages of major ranking events, and £500 in non-televised stages or at Players Tour Championship events. If no player achieved a maximum break at an event, the prize rolled over to the next event until it was won.

At the 2016 Welsh Open, in his 4‍–‍1 victory over Barry Pinches in the first round, Ronnie O'Sullivan declined the opportunity to make a maximum break in the fifth frame of the match, potting the pink off the penultimate red and completing a break of 146. He stated afterwards that the prize money of £10,000 was not worthy of a 147. Then World Snooker chairman Barry Hearn called the decision "unacceptable" and "disrespectful".

Since the start of the 2019‍–‍20 season, individual prizes for a maximum break have generally been phased out in the vast majority of tournaments; during that season, a £1 million bonus was offered if 20 or more were made during the season. The prize would be split among all players who had made at least one qualifying break, with each player receiving an equal share for every break made. That bonus was never claimed, and as a result of the COVID-19 pandemic later that season, it was discontinued and has not since been re-offered. Despite maximum break prizes being phased out in most cases, they have been partially re-introduced at the World Snooker Championship, where £40,000 is now offered to those who compile one at the main stages of the tournament.

Beginning with the 2023‍–‍24 season, WST started offering a £147,000 bonus to any player making two maximum breaks during the season's Triple Crown events. For the 2024‍–‍25 and 2025‍–‍26 seasons, the bonus was extended to include any maximum breaks made at the Saudi Arabia Snooker Masters. WST discontinued the prize for the 2026‍–‍27 season.. In all, this prize was awarded three times: first when Jackson Page made two maximums in the same match during the 2025 World Snooker Championship qualifying; second when O'Sullivan made two maximums in the same match at the 2025 Saudi Arabia Snooker Masters; and third, when Chang Bingyu made a maximum break each in the qualifying stages of the 2025 UK Championship and the 2026 World Championship.

== Breaks exceeding 147 ==
A break higher than 147 can be achieved when an opponent fouls before any reds are potted and leaves the incoming player snookered on all 15 reds. The player can nominate one of the other colours as a red, known as a free ball, which carries the same value as a red for just that shot. If the free ball is potted, the referee places this coloured ball back on its original location, de facto creating a setup as if there were 16 reds in total, thus creating a potential maximum break of 155 if a player starts from a free ball position.

- On 16 October 2004, during qualifying for the UK Championship, Jamie Burnett became the first player to record a break of more than 147 in tournament play, when he scored 148 against Leo Fernandez. He took the brown as the free ball, then potted the brown again followed by the 15 reds with 12 blacks, two pinks and a blue, then the six colours.
- On 20 March 2026, Ronnie O'Sullivan surpassed Burnett's long-standing record in his quarter-final match against Ryan Day at the World Open. After a series of fouls by Day, O'Sullivan potted the green as a free ball, then the black, followed by the 15 reds with 13 more blacks, two pinks and the six colours for a 153 break.

Some breaks exceeding 147 have been reported in non‑tournament settings:

- A 151 is reported to have been compiled by Wally West against Butch Rogers in West London's Hounslow Luciana snooker club during a club match in 1976. After Rogers fouled, West took the green as his free ball followed by the brown. He then took 14 reds and blacks and a pink off the last red. He then cleared up to make the 151.
- In April 1988 Steve Duggan made a 148 in a practice frame against Mark Rowing in Doncaster.
- In 1993 Stephen Hendry made a 148 in a practice match against Alfie Burden.
- In 1995 Tony Drago made a 149 in practice against Nick Manning in West Norwood, London, that was recorded by the Guinness Book of Records as the highest in this category. In that match Drago nominated the brown as the free ball, to score one point. He then potted the brown again, for four more points, before potting the 15 reds with 13 blacks, a pink and a blue, then all the colours.
- In 1997 Eddie Manning achieved a 149 break in a practice match against Kam Pandya at Willie Thorne's Snooker Club in Leicester. He potted brown, brown, 13 blacks, pink and blue.
- In April 2003 Jamie Cope made a 151 break at The Reardon Snooker Club during a practice game with David Fomm‑Ward. After a foul by his opponent, Cope was snookered behind the brown ball. He took the brown as the free ball and then potted the blue, 13 reds with blacks and two with pinks, then the six colours.
- In 2005, Jamie Cope made snooker's first highest possible 155 break in a witnessed practice frame.
- In November 2010 Sam Harvey made a 151 break in a practice match against Kyren Wilson at his home club in Bedford. Harvey potted the brown as the free ball and then the black, 12 reds with blacks, two with pinks and one with blue, then the six colours.
- In August 2021, Thepchaiya Un-Nooh made a 155 break in a practice match against Hossein Vafaei. The feat was filmed by a security camera.
- In March 2022, Marco Fu made a 149 break in a practice match against Noppon Saengkham at the Ding Junhui Snooker Academy.

== List of official maximum breaks ==
Note: If the table is sorted by anything other than "No.", "Date", or "Season", then using the Table of Contents above could produce unexpected results.

Official maximum breaks achieved in professional competition.
No.	Date	Season	Player	Age	Opponent	Event	Ref.
1	11 January 1982	81–82	Steve Davis	24 years, 142 days	John Spencer	Classic	
2	23 April 1983	82–83	Cliff Thorburn	35 years, 97 days	Terry Griffiths	World Championship	
3	28 January 1984	83–84	Kirk Stevens	25 years, 164 days	Jimmy White	Masters (L)	
4	17 November 1987	87–88	Willie Thorne	33 years, 258 days	Tommy Murphy	UK Championship	
5	20 February 1988	87–88 (2)	Tony Meo	28 years, 139 days	Stephen Hendry	Matchroom League (L)	
6	24 September 1988	88–89	Alain Robidoux	28 years, 61 days	Jim Meadowcroft	European Open (Q)	
7	18 February 1989	88–89 (2)	John Rea	37 years, 75 days	Ian Black	Scottish Pro. Championship	
8	8 March 1989	88–89 (3)	Cliff Thorburn (2nd)	41 years, 51 days	Jimmy White	Matchroom League	
9	16 January 1991	90–91	James Wattana	20 years, 364 days	Paul Dawkins	World Masters	
10	5 June 1991	91–92	Peter Ebdon	20 years, 282 days	Wayne Martin	Strachan Open (Q)	
11	25 February 1992	91–92 (2)	James Wattana (2nd)	22 years, 39 days	Tony Drago	British Open	
12	22 April 1992	91–92 (3)	Jimmy White	29 years, 356 days	Tony Drago	World Championship	
13	9 May 1992	91–92 (4)	John Parrott	27 years, 364 days	Tony Meo	Matchroom League	
14	24 May 1992	91–92 (5)	Stephen Hendry	23 years, 132 days	Willie Thorne	Matchroom League	
15	14 November 1992	92–93	Peter Ebdon (2nd)	22 years, 79 days	Ken Doherty	UK Championship (L)	
16	7 September 1994	94–95	David McDonnell	22 years, 331 days	Nic Barrow	British Open (Q)	
17	27 April 1995	94–95 (2)	Stephen Hendry (2nd)	26 years, 104 days	Jimmy White	World Championship	
18	25 November 1995	95–96	Stephen Hendry (3rd)	26 years, 316 days	Gary Wilkinson	UK Championship	
19	5 January 1997	96–97	Stephen Hendry (4th)	27 years, 358 days	Ronnie O'Sullivan	Charity Challenge (F)	
20	21 April 1997	96–97 (2)	Ronnie O'Sullivan	21 years, 137 days	Mick Price	World Championship	
21	18 September 1997	97–98	James Wattana (3rd)	27 years, 244 days	Pang Weiguo	China International	
22	23 May 1998	97–98 (2)	Stephen Hendry (5th)	29 years, 130 days	Ken Doherty	Premier League (L)	
23	10 August 1998	98–99	Adrian Gunnell	25 years, 351 days	Mario Wehrmann	Thailand Masters (Q)	
24	13 August 1998	98–99 (2)	Mehmet Husnu	26 years, 19 days	Eddie Barker	China International (Q)	
25	13 January 1999	98–99 (3)	Jason Prince	28 years, 210 days	Ian Brumby	British Open (Q) (L)	
26	29 January 1999	98–99 (4)	Ronnie O'Sullivan (2nd)	23 years, 55 days	James Wattana	Welsh Open	
27	4 February 1999	98–99 (5)	Stuart Bingham	22 years, 259 days	Barry Hawkins	UK Tour – Event 3	
28	22 March 1999	98–99 (6)	Nick Dyson	29 years, 93 days	Adrian Gunnell	UK Tour – Event 4	
29	6 April 1999	98–99 (7)	Graeme Dott	21 years, 329 days	David Roe	British Open	
30	19 September 1999	99–00	Stephen Hendry (6th)	30 years, 249 days	Peter Ebdon	British Open (F)	
31	21 September 1999	99–00 (2)	Barry Pinches	29 years, 70 days	Joe Johnson	Welsh Open (Q) (L)	
32	18 October 1999	99–00 (3)	Ronnie O'Sullivan (3rd)	23 years, 317 days	Graeme Dott	Grand Prix	
33	4 November 1999	99–00 (4)	Karl Burrows	31 years, 322 days	Adrian Rosa	Masters (Q) (L)	
34	22 November 1999	99–00 (5)	Stephen Hendry (7th)	30 years, 313 days	Paul Wykes	UK Championship	
35	21 January 2000	99–00 (6)	John Higgins	24 years, 248 days	Dennis Taylor	Nations Cup	
36	24 March 2000	99–00 (7)	John Higgins (2nd)	24 years, 311 days	Jimmy White	Irish Masters	
37	28 March 2000	99–00 (8)	Stephen Maguire	19 years, 15 days	Phaitoon Phonbun	Scottish Open (Q) (L)	
38	5 April 2000	99–00 (9)	Ronnie O'Sullivan (4th)	24 years, 122 days	Quinten Hann	Scottish Open	
39	25 October 2000	00–01	Marco Fu	22 years, 291 days	Ken Doherty	Scottish Masters (L)	
40	7 November 2000	00–01 (2)	David McLellan	30 years, 302 days	Steve Meakin	Masters (Q)	
41	19 November 2000	00–01 (3)	Nick Dyson (2nd)	30 years, 336 days	Robert Milkins	UK Championship (Q)	
42	25 February 2001	00–01 (4)	Stephen Hendry (8th)	32 years, 43 days	Mark Williams	Malta Grand Prix (F)	
43	17 October 2001	01–02	Ronnie O'Sullivan (5th)	25 years, 316 days	Drew Henry	LG Cup	
44	12 November 2001	01–02 (2)	Shaun Murphy	19 years, 94 days	Adrian Rosa	Masters (Q)	
45	28 October 2002	02–03	Tony Drago	37 years, 36 days	Stuart Bingham	Masters (Q) (L)	
46	22 April 2003	02–03 (2)	Ronnie O'Sullivan (6th)	27 years, 138 days	Marco Fu	World Championship (L)	
47	12 October 2003	03–04	John Higgins (3rd)	28 years, 147 days	Mark Williams	LG Cup (F) (L)	
48	12 November 2003	03–04 (2)	John Higgins (4th)	28 years, 178 days	Michael Judge	British Open	
49	4 October 2004	04–05	John Higgins (5th)	29 years, 139 days	Ricky Walden	Grand Prix (L)	
50	17 November 2004	04–05 (2)	David Gray	25 years, 282 days	Mark Selby	UK Championship	
51	20 April 2005	04–05 (3)	Mark Williams	30 years, 30 days	Robert Milkins	World Championship	
52	22 November 2005	05–06	Stuart Bingham (2nd)	29 years, 185 days	Marcus Campbell	Masters (Q)	
53	14 March 2006	05–06 (2)	Robert Milkins	30 years, 8 days	Mark Selby	World Championship (Q) (L)	
54	23 October 2006	06–07	Jamie Cope	21 years, 41 days	Michael Holt	Grand Prix	
55	14 January 2007	06–07 (2)	Ding Junhui	19 years, 288 days	Anthony Hamilton	Masters	
56	16 February 2007	06–07 (3)	Andrew Higginson	29 years, 65 days	Ali Carter	Welsh Open	
57	19 September 2007	07–08	Jamie Burnett	32 years, 3 days	Liu Song	Grand Prix (Q)	
58	14 October 2007	07–08 (2)	Tom Ford	24 years, 58 days	Steve Davis	Grand Prix	
59	8 November 2007	07–08 (3)	Ronnie O'Sullivan (7th)	31 years, 338 days	Ali Carter	Northern Ireland Trophy	
60	15 December 2007	07–08 (4)	Ronnie O'Sullivan (8th)	32 years, 10 days	Mark Selby	UK Championship	
61	29 March 2008	07–08 (5)	Stephen Maguire (2nd)	27 years, 16 days	Ryan Day	China Open	
62	28 April 2008	07–08 (6)	Ronnie O'Sullivan (9th)	32 years, 145 days	Mark Williams	World Championship	
63	29 April 2008	07–08 (7)	Ali Carter	28 years, 279 days	Peter Ebdon	World Championship	
64	2 October 2008	08–09	Jamie Cope (2nd)	23 years, 20 days	Mark Williams	Shanghai Masters (L)	
65	29 October 2008	08–09 (2)	Liang Wenbo	21 years, 238 days	Martin Gould	Bahrain Championship (Q)	
66	8 November 2008	08–09 (3)	Marcus Campbell	36 years, 47 days	Ahmed Basheer Al-Khusaibi	Bahrain Championship	
67	16 December 2008	08–09 (4)	Ding Junhui (2nd)	21 years, 259 days	John Higgins	UK Championship (L)	
68	28 April 2009	08–09 (5)	Stephen Hendry (9th)	40 years, 105 days	Shaun Murphy	World Championship (L)	
69	5 June 2009	09–10	Mark Selby	25 years, 351 days	Joe Perry	Jiangsu Classic (L)	
70	1 April 2010	09–10 (2)	Neil Robertson	28 years, 49 days	Peter Ebdon	China Open (L)	
71	25 June 2010	10–11	Kurt Maflin	26 years, 321 days	Michal Zielinski	PTC – Event 1	
72	6 August 2010	10–11 (2)	Barry Hawkins	31 years, 105 days	James McGouran	PTC – Event 3	
73	20 September 2010	10–11 (3)	Ronnie O'Sullivan (10th)	34 years, 289 days	Mark King	World Open (Q)	
74	22 October 2010	10–11 (4)	Thanawat Thirapongpaiboon	16 years, 312 days	Barry Hawkins	Rhein–Main Masters (L)	
75	23 October 2010	10–11 (5)	Mark Williams (2nd)	35 years, 216 days	Diana Schuler	Rhein–Main Masters	
76	19 November 2010	10–11 (6)	Rory McLeod	39 years, 238 days	Issara Kachaiwong	Prague Classic (L)	
77	17 February 2011	10–11 (7)	Stephen Hendry (10th)	42 years, 35 days	Stephen Maguire	Welsh Open (L)	
78	26 August 2011	11–12	Ronnie O'Sullivan (11th)	35 years, 264 days	Adam Duffy	Paul Hunter Classic	
79	22 November 2011	11–12 (2)	Mike Dunn	40 years, 2 days	Kurt Maflin	German Masters (Q)	
80	27 November 2011	11–12 (3)	David Gray (2nd)	32 years, 291 days	Robbie Williams	PTC – Event 10 (Q)	
81	29 November 2011	11–12 (4)	Ricky Walden	29 years, 18 days	Gareth Allen	PTC – Event 10	
82	15 December 2011	11–12 (5)	Matthew Stevens	32 years, 95 days	Michael Wasley	FFB Snooker Open	
83	15 December 2011	11–12 (6)	Ding Junhui (3rd)	24 years, 258 days	Brandon Winstone	FFB Snooker Open	
84	17 December 2011	11–12 (7)	Ding Junhui (4th)	24 years, 260 days	James Cahill	PTC – Event 11	
85	18 December 2011	11–12 (8)	Jamie Cope (3rd)	26 years, 97 days	Kurt Maflin	PTC – Event 11	
86	14 January 2012	11–12 (9)	Marco Fu (2nd)	34 years, 6 days	Matthew Selt	World Open (Q)	
87	11 April 2012	11–12 (10)	Robert Milkins (2nd)	36 years, 36 days	Xiao Guodong	World Championship (Q)	
88	21 April 2012	11–12 (11)	Stephen Hendry (11th)	43 years, 99 days	Stuart Bingham	World Championship	
89	1 July 2012	12–13	Stuart Bingham (3rd)	36 years, 41 days	Ricky Walden	Wuxi Classic (F) (L)	
90	24 August 2012	12–13 (2)	Ken Doherty	42 years, 342 days	Julian Treiber	Paul Hunter Classic	
91	23 September 2012	12–13 (3)	John Higgins (6th)	37 years, 128 days	Judd Trump	Shanghai Masters (F)	
92	16 November 2012	12–13 (4)	Tom Ford (2nd)	29 years, 91 days	Matthew Stevens	Bulgarian Open	
93	21 November 2012	12–13 (5)	Andy Hicks	39 years, 103 days	Daniel Wells	UK Championship (Q)	
94	22 November 2012	12–13 (6)	Jack Lisowski	21 years, 150 days	Chen Zhe	UK Championship (Q)	
95	5 December 2012	12–13 (7)	John Higgins (7th)	37 years, 201 days	Mark Davis	UK Championship (L)	
96	14 December 2012	12–13 (8)	Kurt Maflin (2nd)	29 years, 128 days	Stuart Carrington	Scottish Open	
97	16 March 2013	12–13 (9)	Ding Junhui (5th)	25 years, 349 days	Mark Allen	PTC – Grand Final	
98	28 May 2013	12–13 (10)	Neil Robertson (2nd)	31 years, 106 days	Mohamed Khairy	Wuxi Classic (Q)	
99	15 November 2013	13–14	Judd Trump	24 years, 87 days	Mark Selby	Antwerp Open (L)	
100	7 December 2013	13–14 (2)	Mark Selby (2nd)	30 years, 171 days	Ricky Walden	UK Championship	
101	11 December 2013	13–14 (3)	Dechawat Poomjaeng	35 years, 153 days	Zak Surety	German Masters (Q)	
102	12 December 2013	13–14 (4)	Gary Wilson	28 years, 123 days	Ricky Walden	German Masters (Q)	
103	8 January 2014	13–14 (5)	Shaun Murphy (2nd)	31 years, 151 days	Mark Davis	Championship League	
104	9 February 2014	13–14 (6)	Shaun Murphy (3rd)	31 years, 183 days	Jamie Jones	Gdynia Open	
105	2 March 2014	13–14 (7)	Ronnie O'Sullivan (12th)	38 years, 87 days	Ding Junhui	Welsh Open (F)	
106	22 August 2014	14–15	Aditya Mehta	28 years, 295 days	Stephen Maguire	Paul Hunter Classic (L)	
107	23 October 2014	14–15 (2)	Ryan Day	34 years, 214 days	Cao Yupeng	Haining Open	
108	23 November 2014	14–15 (3)	Shaun Murphy (4th)	32 years, 105 days	Robert Milkins	Ruhr Open (F)	
109	4 December 2014	14–15 (4)	Ronnie O'Sullivan (13th)	38 years, 364 days	Matthew Selt	UK Championship	
110	12 December 2014	14–15 (5)	Ben Woollaston	27 years, 212 days	Joe Steele	Lisbon Open	
111	5 January 2015	14–15 (6)	Barry Hawkins (2nd)	35 years, 257 days	Stephen Maguire	Championship League	
112	11 January 2015	14–15 (7)	Marco Fu (3rd)	37 years, 3 days	Stuart Bingham	Masters	
113	6 February 2015	14–15 (8)	Judd Trump (2nd)	25 years, 170 days	Mark Selby	German Masters (L)	
114	10 February 2015	14–15 (9)	David Gilbert	33 years, 243 days	Xiao Guodong	Championship League (L)	
115	6 December 2015	15–16	Neil Robertson (3rd)	33 years, 298 days	Liang Wenbo	UK Championship (F)	
116	11 December 2015	15–16 (2)	Marco Fu (4th)	37 years, 337 days	Sam Baird	Gibraltar Open	
117	19 February 2016	15–16 (3)	Ding Junhui (6th)	28 years, 324 days	Neil Robertson	Welsh Open (L)	
118	25 February 2016	15–16 (4)	Fergal O'Brien	43 years, 354 days	Mark Davis	Championship League (L)	
119	27 August 2016	16–17	Thepchaiya Un-Nooh	31 years, 131 days	Kurt Maflin	Paul Hunter Classic	
120	20 September 2016	16–17 (2)	Stephen Maguire (3rd)	35 years, 191 days	Xu Yichen	Shanghai Masters	
121	28 September 2016	16–17 (3)	Shaun Murphy (5th)	34 years, 49 days	Allan Taylor	European Masters (Q)	
122	11 October 2016	16–17 (4)	Alfie Burden	39 years, 302 days	Daniel Wells	English Open (L)	
123	16 November 2016	16–17 (5)	John Higgins (8th)	41 years, 182 days	Sam Craigie	Northern Ireland Open	
124	27 November 2016	16–17 (6)	Mark Allen	30 years, 279 days	Rod Lawler	UK Championship	
125	8 December 2016	16–17 (7)	Ali Carter (2nd)	37 years, 136 days	Wang Yuchen	German Masters (Q)	
126	8 December 2016	16–17 (8)	Ross Muir	21 years, 63 days	Itaro Santos	German Masters (Q)	
127	10 January 2017	16–17 (9)	Mark Davis	44 years, 151 days	Neil Robertson	Championship League	
128	1 February 2017	16–17 (10)	Tom Ford (3rd)	33 years, 168 days	Peter Ebdon	German Masters	
129	2 March 2017	16–17 (11)	Mark Davis (2nd)	44 years, 202 days	John Higgins	Championship League	
130	30 March 2017	16–17 (12)	Judd Trump (3rd)	27 years, 222 days	Tian Pengfei	China Open	
131	6 April 2017	16–17 (13)	Gary Wilson (2nd)	31 years, 238 days	Josh Boileau	World Championship (Q)	
132	18 October 2017	17–18	Liang Wenbo (2nd)	30 years, 227 days	Tom Ford	English Open	
133	31 October 2017	17–18 (2)	Kyren Wilson	25 years, 312 days	Martin Gould	International Championship (L)	
134	12 December 2017	17–18 (3)	Cao Yupeng	27 years, 46 days	Andrew Higginson	Scottish Open	
135	26 January 2018	17–18 (4)	Martin Gould	36 years, 134 days	Li Hang	Championship League	
136	26 March 2018	17–18 (5)	Luca Brecel	23 years, 18 days	John Higgins	Championship League	
137	3 April 2018	17–18 (6)	Ronnie O'Sullivan (14th)	42 years, 119 days	Elliot Slessor	China Open (L)	
138	4 April 2018	17–18 (7)	Stuart Bingham (4th)	41 years, 318 days	Ricky Walden	China Open	
139	12 April 2018	17–18 (8)	Liang Wenbo (3rd)	31 years, 38 days	Rod Lawler	World Championship (Q)	
140	24 August 2018	18–19	Michael Georgiou	30 years, 218 days	Umut Dikme	Paul Hunter Classic	
141	24 August 2018	18–19 (2)	Jamie Jones	30 years, 191 days	Lee Walker	Paul Hunter Classic (L)	
142	16 October 2018	18–19 (3)	Thepchaiya Un-Nooh (2nd)	33 years, 181 days	Soheil Vahedi	English Open	
143	17 October 2018	18–19 (4)	Ronnie O'Sullivan (15th)	42 years, 316 days	Allan Taylor	English Open	
144	8 November 2018	18–19 (5)	Mark Selby (3rd)	35 years, 120 days	Neil Robertson	Champion of Champions (L)	
145	12 December 2018	18–19 (6)	John Higgins (9th)	43 years, 208 days	Gerard Greene	Scottish Open	
146	21 December 2018	18–19 (7)	Judd Trump (4th)	29 years, 123 days	Lukas Kleckers	German Masters (Q)	
147	22 January 2019	18–19 (8)	David Gilbert (2nd)	37 years, 224 days	Stephen Maguire	Championship League (L)	
148	12 February 2019	18–19 (9)	Neil Robertson (4th)	37 years, 1 day	Jordan Brown	Welsh Open	
149	14 February 2019	18–19 (10)	Noppon Saengkham	26 years, 214 days	Mark Selby	Welsh Open (L)	
150	28 February 2019	18–19 (11)	Zhou Yuelong	21 years, 35 days	Lyu Haotian	Indian Open (L)	
151	3 April 2019	18–19 (12)	Stuart Bingham (5th)	42 years, 317 days	Peter Ebdon	China Open	
152	17 June 2019	19–20	Tom Ford (4th)	35 years, 304 days	Fraser Patrick	International Championship (Q)	
153	17 October 2019	19–20 (2)	Tom Ford (5th)	36 years, 61 days	Shaun Murphy	English Open	
154	12 November 2019	19–20 (3)	Stuart Bingham (6th)	43 years, 175 days	Lu Ning	Northern Ireland Open	
155	27 November 2019	19–20 (4)	Barry Hawkins (3rd)	40 years, 218 days	Gerard Greene	UK Championship	
156	11 February 2020	19–20 (5)	Kyren Wilson (2nd)	28 years, 50 days	Jackson Page	Welsh Open	
157	6 August 2020	19–20 (6)	John Higgins (10th)	45 years, 80 days	Kurt Maflin	World Championship (L)	
158	13 September 2020	20–21	Ryan Day (2nd)	40 years, 175 days	Rod Lawler	Championship League	
159	30 October 2020	20–21 (2)	John Higgins (11th)	45 years, 165 days	Kyren Wilson	Championship League	
160	10 November 2020	20–21 (3)	Shaun Murphy (6th)	38 years, 92 days	Chen Zifan	German Masters (Q)	
161	18 November 2020	20–21 (4)	Judd Trump (5th)	31 years, 90 days	Gao Yang	Northern Ireland Open	
162	24 November 2020	20–21 (5)	Kyren Wilson (3rd)	28 years, 337 days	Ashley Hugill	UK Championship	
163	25 November 2020	20–21 (6)	Stuart Bingham (7th)	44 years, 188 days	Zak Surety	UK Championship	
164	7 December 2020	20–21 (7)	Zhou Yuelong (2nd)	22 years, 318 days	Peter Lines	Scottish Open	
165	4 January 2021	20–21 (8)	Stuart Bingham (8th)	44 years, 228 days	Thepchaiya Un-Nooh	Championship League	
166	20 January 2021	20–21 (9)	Gary Wilson (3rd)	35 years, 162 days	Liam Highfield	WST Pro Series (L)	
167	16 August 2021	21–22	John Higgins (12th)	46 years, 90 days	Alexander Ursenbacher	British Open	
168	20 August 2021	21–22 (2)	Ali Carter (3rd)	42 years, 26 days	Elliot Slessor	British Open (L)	
169	24 September 2021	21–22 (3)	Xiao Guodong	32 years, 226 days	Fraser Patrick	Scottish Open (Q)	
170	10 October 2021	21–22 (4)	Mark Allen (2nd)	35 years, 230 days	Si Jiahui	Northern Ireland Open	
171	22 October 2021	21–22 (5)	Thepchaiya Un-Nooh (3rd)	36 years, 187 days	Fan Zhengyi	German Masters (Q) (L)	
172	24 November 2021	21–22 (6)	Gary Wilson (4th)	36 years, 105 days	Ian Burns	UK Championship	
173	13 March 2022	21–22 (7)	Judd Trump (6th)	32 years, 205 days	Matthew Selt	Turkish Masters (F)	
174	25 March 2022	21–22 (8)	Stuart Bingham (9th)	45 years, 308 days	Gerard Greene	Gibraltar Open	
175	11 April 2022	21–22 (9)	Graeme Dott (2nd)	44 years, 334 days	Pang Junxu	World Championship (Q)	
176	25 April 2022	21–22 (10)	Neil Robertson (5th)	40 years, 73 days	Jack Lisowski	World Championship (L)	
177	16 July 2022	22–23	Zhang Anda	30 years, 203 days	Anton Kazakov	European Masters (Q)	
178	17 July 2022	22–23 (2)	Hossein Vafaei	27 years, 275 days	Ng On-yee	European Masters (Q)	
179	29 September 2022	22–23 (3)	Mark Selby (4th)	39 years, 102 days	Jack Lisowski	British Open	
180	8 October 2022	22–23 (4)	Marco Fu (5th)	44 years, 273 days	John Higgins	Hong Kong Masters	
181	6 November 2022	22–23 (5)	Judd Trump (7th)	33 years, 78 days	Ronnie O'Sullivan	Champion of Champions (F) (L)	
182	29 November 2022	22–23 (6)	Judd Trump (8th)	33 years, 101 days	Mitchell Mann	Scottish Open	
183	16 December 2022	22–23 (7)	Mark Williams (3rd)	47 years, 270 days	Neil Robertson	English Open (L)	
184	3 February 2023	22–23 (8)	Robert Milkins (3rd)	46 years, 334 days	Chris Wakelin	German Masters	
185	16 February 2023	22–23 (9)	Shaun Murphy (7th)	40 years, 190 days	Daniel Wells	Welsh Open	
186	20 March 2023	22–23 (10)	Thepchaiya Un-Nooh (4th)	37 years, 336 days	Xu Si	WST Classic (L)	
187	30 March 2023	22–23 (11)	Ryan Day (3rd)	43 years, 7 days	Mark Selby	Tour Championship (L)	
188	19 April 2023	22–23 (12)	Kyren Wilson (4th)	31 years, 117 days	Ryan Day	World Championship	
189	30 April 2023	22–23 (13)	Mark Selby (5th)	39 years, 315 days	Luca Brecel	World Championship (F) (L)	
190	28 July 2023	23–24	Sean O'Sullivan	29 years, 90 days	Barry Hawkins	European Masters (Q) (L)	
191	18 September 2023	23–24 (2)	Ryan Day (4th)	43 years, 179 days	Mink Nutcharut	International Championship (Q)	
192	12 November 2023	23–24 (3)	Zhang Anda (2nd)	31 years, 322 days	Tom Ford	International Championship (F)	
193	19 November 2023	23–24 (4)	Xu Si	25 years, 299 days	Ma Hailong	UK Championship (Q)	
194	7 December 2023	23–24 (5)	Shaun Murphy (8th)	41 years, 119 days	Bulcsú Révész	Snooker Shoot Out	
195	8 January 2024	23–24 (6)	Ding Junhui (7th)	36 years, 282 days	Ronnie O'Sullivan	Masters (L)	
196	12 January 2024	23–24 (7)	Mark Allen (3rd)	37 years, 324 days	Mark Selby	Masters	
197	6 February 2024	23–24 (8)	Kyren Wilson (5th)	32 years, 45 days	Tom Ford	Championship League	
198	10 February 2024	23–24 (9)	John Higgins (13th)	48 years, 268 days	Fan Zhengyi	Championship League	
199	17 February 2024	23–24 (10)	Gary Wilson (5th)	38 years, 190 days	John Higgins	Welsh Open	
200	29 February 2024	23–24 (11)	Joe O'Connor	28 years, 113 days	Elliot Slessor	Championship League	
201	18 March 2024	23–24 (12)	Zak Surety	32 years, 166 days	Ding Junhui	World Open (L)	
202	15 April 2024	23–24 (13)	Noppon Saengkham (2nd)	31 years, 275 days	Andy Hicks	World Championship (Q)	
203	1 September 2024	24–25	Noppon Saengkham (3rd)	32 years, 48 days	Amir Sarkhosh	Saudi Arabia Masters	
204	13 September 2024	24–25 (2)	Fan Zhengyi	23 years, 230 days	Liam Pullen	English Open (Q)	
205	26 September 2024	24–25 (3)	Mark Allen (4th)	38 years, 217 days	Ben Mertens	British Open	
206	11 October 2024	24–25 (4)	Si Jiahui	22 years, 92 days	Judd Trump	Wuhan Open	
207	5 November 2024	24–25 (5)	Xu Si (2nd)	26 years, 286 days	Ryan Day	International Championship	
208	26 November 2024	24–25 (6)	Zhang Anda (3rd)	32 years, 337 days	Lei Peifan	UK Championship	
209	7 January 2025	24–25 (7)	Jak Jones	31 years, 162 days	Chris Wakelin	Championship League	
210	18 January 2025	24–25 (8)	Shaun Murphy (9th)	42 years, 161 days	Mark Allen	Masters	
211	25 January 2025	24–25 (9)	David Gilbert (3rd)	43 years, 227 days	Zhou Yuelong	Championship League	
212	5 February 2025	24–25 (10)	Mark Selby (6th)	41 years, 231 days	Xiao Guodong	Championship League	
213	6 February 2025	24–25 (11)	Xu Si (3rd)	27 years, 13 days	Bulcsú Révész	Welsh Open (Q)	
214	24 February 2025	24–25 (12)	Shaun Murphy (10th)	42 years, 198 days	Zhou Jinhao	World Open	
215	13 April 2025	24–25 (13)	Jackson Page	23 years, 248 days	Allan Taylor	World Championship (Q)	
216	14 April 2025	24–25 (14)	Jackson Page (2nd)	23 years, 249 days	Allan Taylor	World Championship (Q)	
217	25 April 2025	24–25 (15)	Mark Allen (5th)	39 years, 62 days	Chris Wakelin	World Championship (L)	
218	17 July 2025	25–26	Fan Zhengyi (2nd)	24 years, 171 days	Xu Si	Championship League	
219	29 July 2025	25–26 (2)	Zhang Anda (4th)	33 years, 216 days	Ding Junhui	Shanghai Masters (L)	
220	10 August 2025	25–26 (3)	Thepchaiya Un-Nooh (5th)	40 years, 114 days	Jordan Brown	Saudi Arabia Masters	
221	15 August 2025	25–26 (4)	Ronnie O'Sullivan (16th)	49 years, 253 days	Chris Wakelin	Saudi Arabia Masters	
222	15 August 2025	25–26 (5)	Ronnie O'Sullivan (17th)	49 years, 253 days	Chris Wakelin	Saudi Arabia Masters	
223	24 August 2025	25–26 (6)	Xiao Guodong (2nd)	36 years, 195 days	Mink Nutcharut	Wuhan Open	
224	25 August 2025	25–26 (7)	Thepchaiya Un-Nooh (6th)	40 years, 129 days	Pang Junxu	Wuhan Open	
225	2 September 2025	25–26 (8)	Zhou Yuelong (3rd)	27 years, 221 days	Julien Leclercq	Xi'an Grand Prix (Q)	
226	14 September 2025	25–26 (9)	Aaron Hill	23 years, 198 days	Yao Pengcheng	English Open	
227	17 September 2025	25–26 (10)	Ali Carter (4th)	46 years, 54 days	Aaron Hill	English Open (L)	
228	2 October 2025	25–26 (11)	Gary Wilson (6th)	40 years, 52 days	Artemijs Žižins	International Championship (Q)	
229	7 October 2025	25–26 (12)	Judd Trump (9th)	36 years, 48 days	Ng On-yee	Xi'an Grand Prix (Q)	
230	7 October 2025	25–26 (13)	Aaron Hill (2nd)	23 years, 221 days	Huang Jiahao	Xi'an Grand Prix	
231	4 November 2025	25–26 (14)	Zak Surety (2nd)	34 years, 31 days	Aaron Hill	International Championship	
232	22 November 2025	25–26 (15)	Liam Pullen	20 years, 134 days	Kaylan Patel	UK Championship (Q)	
233	24 November 2025	25–26 (16)	Chang Bingyu	23 years, 108 days	Stephen Maguire	UK Championship (Q) (L)	
234	2 January 2026	25–26 (17)	Chris Wakelin	33 years, 292 days	Pang Junxu	Championship League	
235	8 January 2026	25–26 (18)	Matthew Selt	40 years, 307 days	Xiao Guodong	Championship League (L)	
236	21 January 2026	25–26 (19)	Xiao Guodong (3rd)	36 years, 345 days	Oliver Lines	Championship League (L)	
237	21 January 2026	25–26 (20)	Wu Yize	22 years, 99 days	Oliver Lines	Championship League	
238	22 January 2026	25–26 (21)	Zhao Xintong	28 years, 294 days	Jak Jones	Championship League	
239	28 January 2026	25–26 (22)	Zhang Anda (5th)	34 years, 34 days	Barry Hawkins	German Masters	
240	22 March 2026	25–26 (23)	Thepchaiya Un-Nooh (7th)	40 years, 338 days	Ronnie O'Sullivan	World Open (F)	
241	12 April 2026	25–26 (24)	Chang Bingyu (2nd)	23 years, 247 days	Luca Brecel	World Championship (Q) (L)	
242	11 June 2026	26–27	Michael Holt	47 years, 308 days	Mark Joyce	China Open (Q)	
243	7 July 2026	26–27 (2)	Si Jiahui (2nd)	23 years, 361 days	Xu Yichen	Championship League	
244	21 July 2026	26–27 (3)	Chang Bingyu (3rd)	23 years, 347 days	Chatchapong Nasa	Shenzhen Open (Q)	
245	24 July 2026	26–27 (4)	Liam Highfield	35 years, 235 days	Stephen Maguire	British Open (Q)	
246	28 July 2026	26–27 (5)	Xiao Guodong (4th)	37 years, 168 days	Neil Robertson	Shanghai Masters (L)	
247	2 November 2026	26–27 (6)	Thepchaiya Un-Nooh (8th)	41 years, 198 days	Mark Williams	International Championship (L)	
248	19 November 2026	26–27 (7)	Jack Lisowski (2nd)	35 years, 147 days	Aaron Hill	German Masters (Q)	

Note: (Q) indicates maximums made during qualifying stages of events. (F) indicates maximums made in tournament finals. (L) indicates that the match was lost by the player who made the maximum.

== List of players with five or more maximums ==
Below is a list of players who have made five or more maximum breaks, as of 2 November 2026.

No.	Player	Number	Most recent	Ref.
1	Ronnie O'Sullivan	17	15 August 2025	
2	John Higgins	13	10 February 2024	
3	Stephen Hendry	11	21 April 2012	
4	Shaun Murphy	10	24 February 2025	
5	Stuart Bingham	9	25 March 2022	
5	Judd Trump	9	7 October 2025	
7	Thepchaiya Un-Nooh	8	2 November 2026	
8	Ding Junhui	7	8 January 2024	
9	Mark Selby	6	5 February 2025	
9	Gary Wilson	6	2 October 2025	
11	Tom Ford	5	17 October 2019	
11	Neil Robertson	5	25 April 2022	
11	Marco Fu	5	8 October 2022	
11	Kyren Wilson	5	6 February 2024	
11	Mark Allen	5	25 April 2025	
11	Zhang Anda	5	28 January 2026	

== See also ==
- Nine-dart finish in darts
- Hole in one in golf
- Perfect game in bowling
- Perfect game in baseball
- Golden set in tennis
