= 2025 Championship League (invitational) =

Professional snooker tournament

2025 BetVictor Championship League Invitational

Tournament information
- Dates: 3 January – 5 February 2025
- Venue: Leicester Arena
- City: Leicester
- Country: England
- Organisation: Matchroom Sport
- Format: Non-ranking event
- Total prize fund: £205,000
- Winner's share: £10,000 (plus bonuses)
- Highest break: Jak Jones (WAL) (147); David Gilbert (ENG) (147); Mark Selby (ENG) (147)

Final
- Champion: Mark Selby (ENG)
- Runner-up: Kyren Wilson (ENG)
- Score: 3–0

The 2025 Championship League Invitational (officially the 2025 BetVictor Championship League Snooker Invitational) was a professional non‑ranking snooker tournament, which took place from 3 January 2025 to 5 February 2025 at the Leicester Arena in Leicester, England.

Mark Selby was the defending champion, having won the tournament for the first time after beating Joe O'Connor 3‍–‍1 in the final of the 2024 event. Selby successfully retained the title, defeating Kyren Wilson 3‍–‍0 in the final. There were 177 century breaks made during the tournament, a record for any professional event, of which Jak Jones compiled 32, breaking the record for most centuries in a single tournament previously held jointly by Kyren Wilson and Matthew Selt. Three maximum breaks were made during the event, compiled by Jak Jones in Group 2, David Gilbert in Group 7 and Mark Selby in the Winners' Group; only the fourth time that three maximums had been made in a tournament, after the 2012 UK Championship, the 2017 German Masters, and the previous Championship League invitational event.

== Format ==
A total of 25 players were initially invited to the event, with the matches played behind closed doors without an audience. Players earned prize money for every frame won, as well as being semi‑finalists, runner‑up, and winner of each group, with more money involved in the Winners' Group. Since 2010, all matches have been played as the best of five frames.

The tournament was played in a round‑robin format, consisting of eight groups of seven players. The top four players in each group qualified for a play‑off, with the winner entering the Winners' Group. The bottom two players in each group were eliminated, and the remaining four moved to the next group, where they were joined by three more players. This format was played for each group, from one to seven. In each group, the players were ranked by the number of matches won, then by most frames won, and then by least frames lost. If two players were tied by these criteria, the player who won the match between them was ranked higher in the table. The group play‑off semi‑finals were contested between the 1st and 4th place players in the table, and between the 2nd and 3rd place players in the table. The Winners' Group was played at the end, and its play‑off winner became champion of the tournament.

Group 1 was played on 3 and 4 January; and Groups 2, 3, and 4 were played from 6 to 11 January. Groups 5, 6, and 7 were played from 20 to 25 January; and the Winners' Group was played on 4 and 5 February. The champion takes a place in the 2025 Champion of Champions.

The event was broadcast by Rigour Media in China; Viaplay in Scandinavia, the Netherlands, and Iceland; and by Matchroom.live in all other territories. Additionally, table one was streamed live on the Matchroom Pool YouTube channel available in the United Kingdom, with table two being available worldwide on the Matchroom Multi Sport YouTube channel.

=== Prize fund ===
The breakdown of prize money for the 2025 Championship League is as follows:

- Groups 1–7
  - Winner: £3,000
  - Runner-up: £2,000
  - Semi-final: £1,000
  - Frame-win (league stage): £100
  - Frame-win (play-offs): £300
  - Highest break: £500
- Winners' Group
  - Winner: £10,000
  - Runner-up: £5,000
  - Semi-final: £3,000
  - Frame-win (league stage): £200
  - Frame-win (play-offs): £300
  - Highest break: £1,000
- Maximum possible tournament total: £205,000 (if all match results are 3‍–‍2)
- Minimum possible tournament total: £152,800 (if all match results are 3‍–‍0)

== Group 1 ==
Group 1 was played on 3 and 4 January 2025. At the end of the first day, Hossein Vafaei led the group. Vafaei won the group and qualified for the Winners' Group. There were 19 century breaks made in Group 1, the highest of which was a 135 made by Jak Jones.

=== Group 1 league matches ===
==== 3 January ====
- Chris Wakelin 1–3 Gary Wilson
- Jak Jones 2–3 Hossein Vafaei
- Ryan Day 3–1 Elliot Slessor
- Chris Wakelin 0–3 Pang Junxu
- Hossein Vafaei 3–1 Elliot Slessor
- Gary Wilson 2–3 Jak Jones
- Chris Wakelin 3–2 Jak Jones
- Ryan Day 3–2 Pang Junxu
- Gary Wilson 1–3 Hossein Vafaei
- Pang Junxu 3–1 Elliot Slessor
- Chris Wakelin 3–2 Hossein Vafaei
- Jak Jones 3–1 Elliot Slessor

==== 4 January ====
- Chris Wakelin 3–1 Ryan Day
- Gary Wilson 2–3 Elliot Slessor
- Hossein Vafaei 0–3 Pang Junxu
- Jak Jones 0–3 Ryan Day
- Chris Wakelin 1–3 Elliot Slessor
- Gary Wilson 2–3 Pang Junxu
- Hossein Vafaei 3–0 Ryan Day
- Jak Jones 3–0 Pang Junxu
- Gary Wilson 0–3 Ryan Day

=== Group 1 table ===
Pos	Player	Pld	W	L	FF	FA	FD	
1	Pang Junxu (CHN)	6	4	2	14	9	+5	Qualification to Group 1 play-off
2	Hossein Vafaei (IRN) (W)	6	4	2	14	10	+4	Qualification to Group 1 play-off
3	Ryan Day (WAL)	6	4	2	13	9	+4	Qualification to Group 1 play-off
4	Jak Jones (WAL)	6	3	3	13	12	+1	Qualification to Group 1 play-off
5	Chris Wakelin (ENG)	6	3	3	11	14	−3	Advanced into Group 2
6	Elliot Slessor (ENG)	6	2	4	10	15	−5	Eliminated from the competition
7	Gary Wilson (ENG)	6	1	5	10	16	−6	Eliminated from the competition

Source: Group 1 results from snooker.org and championshipleaguesnooker.co.uk
(W) Group winner

=== Group 1 play-offs ===
Semi-finals; Best of 5 frames
Pang Junxu (CHN)	1
Jak Jones (WAL)	3
Hossein Vafaei (IRN)	3
Ryan Day (WAL)	1

Final; Best of 5 frames
Jak Jones (WAL)	1
Hossein Vafaei (IRN)	3

== Group 2 ==
Group 2 was played on 6 and 7 January 2025. At the end of the first day, Chris Wakelin led the group. Si Jiahui won the group and qualified for the Winners' Group. There were 15 century breaks made in Group 2, the highest of which was a maximum break made by Jak Jones, the first 147 of his professional career in a league match whitewash victory over Chris Wakelin.

=== Group 2 league matches ===
==== 6 January ====
- Ali Carter 3–1 Si Jiahui
- Chris Wakelin 3–0 Robert Milkins
- Ali Carter 2–3 Pang Junxu
- Jak Jones 2–3 Ryan Day
- Si Jiahui 3–1 Robert Milkins
- Chris Wakelin 3–0 Ryan Day
- Jak Jones 3–0 Pang Junxu
- Ali Carter 2–3 Robert Milkins
- Pang Junxu 0–3 Ryan Day
- Si Jiahui 3–2 Chris Wakelin
- Ali Carter 2–3 Jak Jones
- Robert Milkins 3–1 Ryan Day

==== 7 January ====
- Si Jiahui 3–1 Ryan Day
- Ali Carter 3–1 Chris Wakelin
- Jak Jones 1–3 Robert Milkins
- Chris Wakelin 3–1 Pang Junxu
- Ali Carter 3–2 Ryan Day
- Si Jiahui 3–0 Pang Junxu
- Chris Wakelin 0–3 Jak Jones
- Si Jiahui 3–2 Jak Jones
- Pang Junxu 3–1 Robert Milkins

=== Group 2 table ===
Pos	Player	Pld	W	L	FF	FA	FD	
1	Si Jiahui (CHN) (W)	6	5	1	16	9	+7	Qualification to Group 2 play-off
2	Ali Carter (ENG)	6	3	3	15	13	+2	Qualification to Group 2 play-off
3	Jak Jones (WAL)	6	3	3	14	11	+3	Qualification to Group 2 play-off
4	Chris Wakelin (ENG)	6	3	3	12	10	+2	Qualification to Group 2 play-off
5	Robert Milkins (ENG)	6	3	3	11	13	−2	Advanced into Group 3
6	Ryan Day (WAL)	6	2	4	10	14	−4	Eliminated from the competition
7	Pang Junxu (CHN)	6	2	4	7	15	−8	Eliminated from the competition

Source: Group 2 results from snooker.org and championshipleaguesnooker.co.uk
(W) Group winner

=== Group 2 play-offs ===
Semi-finals; Best of 5 frames
Si Jiahui (CHN)	3
Chris Wakelin (ENG)	2
Ali Carter (ENG)	1
Jak Jones (WAL)	3

Final; Best of 5 frames
Si Jiahui (CHN)	3
Jak Jones (WAL)	2

== Group 3 ==
Group 3 was played on 8 and 9 January 2025. At the end of the first day, Mark Selby led the group. Kyren Wilson won the group and qualified for the Winners' Group. There were 20 century breaks made in Group 3, the highest of which was a 140 made by Selby.

Note: Ronnie O’Sullivan played five matches, then subsequently withdrew and did not compete further. He was not replaced by another player, and the group continued as a six‑player group with the matches already played against O'Sullivan declared void.

=== Group 3 league matches ===
==== 8 January ====
- Kyren Wilson 1–3 Mark Selby
- Ali Carter 3–0 Robert Milkins
- Ali Carter 3–0 Jak Jones
- Mark Selby 3–1 Robert Milkins
- Jak Jones 3–2 Chris Wakelin
- Ali Carter 0–3 Chris Wakelin
- Kyren Wilson 3–1 Robert Milkins
- Mark Selby 3–1 Ali Carter

Results not counted after O'Sullivan's withdrawal:

- Ronnie O'Sullivan 2–3 Chris Wakelin
- Kyren Wilson 3–1 Ronnie O'Sullivan
- Ronnie O'Sullivan 2–3 Mark Selby
- Ronnie O'Sullivan 3–2 Jak Jones

==== 9 January ====
- Kyren Wilson 3–2 Ali Carter
- Chris Wakelin 2–3 Robert Milkins
- Mark Selby 3–0 Jak Jones
- Kyren Wilson 3–1 Chris Wakelin
- Jak Jones 3–2 Robert Milkins
- Kyren Wilson 3–1 Jak Jones
- Mark Selby 3–0 Chris Wakelin

Result not counted after O'Sullivan's withdrawal:

- Ronnie O'Sullivan 2–3 Robert Milkins

Match not played:

- Ronnie O'Sullivan v Ali Carter

=== Group 3 table ===
Pos	Player	Pld	W	L	FF	FA	FD	
1	Mark Selby (ENG)	5	5	0	15	3	+12	Qualification to Group 3 play-off
2	Kyren Wilson (ENG) (W)	5	4	1	13	8	+5	Qualification to Group 3 play-off
3	Ali Carter (ENG)	5	2	3	9	9	0	Qualification to Group 3 play-off
4	Jak Jones (WAL)	5	2	3	7	13	−6	Qualification to Group 3 play-off
5	Chris Wakelin (ENG)	5	1	4	8	12	−4	Advanced into Group 4
6	Robert Milkins (ENG)	5	1	4	7	14	−7	Eliminated from the competition
7	Ronnie O'Sullivan (ENG)	0	0	0	0	0	0	Withdrew after playing five matches

Source: Group 3 results from snooker.org and championshipleaguesnooker.co.uk
(W) Group winner

=== Group 3 play-offs ===
Semi-finals; Best of 5 frames
Mark Selby (ENG)	1
Jak Jones (WAL)	3
Kyren Wilson (ENG)	3
Ali Carter (ENG)	2

Final; Best of 5 frames
Jak Jones (WAL)	2
Kyren Wilson (ENG)	3

== Group 4 ==
Group 4 was played on 10 and 11 January 2025. At the end of the first day, Joe O'Connor led the group with four wins in four matches, and Stuart Bingham made his 600th career century. Mark Selby won the group and qualified for the Winners' Group. There were 26 century breaks made in Group 4, the highest of which was a 143 made by Bingham.

Note: Barry Hawkins was originally invited to play in Group 4 but withdrew. Both Ali Carter and Chris Wakelin advanced from Group 3 to Group 4 but then withdrew. The three players were replaced by O'Connor, Jimmy Robertson, and Matthew Selt. Selt was originally invited to play in Group 7, and was replaced in that group by Fan Zhengyi. Fan also withdrew later, and was replaced in Group 7 by Ricky Walden.

=== Group 4 league matches ===
==== 10 January ====
- Jackson Page 1–3 Jimmy Robertson
- Stuart Bingham 3–1 Matthew Selt
- Jak Jones 2–3 Joe O'Connor
- Mark Selby 3–2 Matthew Selt
- Stuart Bingham 3–1 Jackson Page
- Jimmy Robertson 1–3 Joe O'Connor
- Matthew Selt 3–1 Jackson Page
- Mark Selby 3–1 Jak Jones
- Mark Selby 2–3 Joe O'Connor
- Stuart Bingham 3–2 Jimmy Robertson
- Jak Jones 3–1 Matthew Selt
- Jackson Page 0–3 Joe O'Connor

==== 11 January ====
- Matthew Selt 3–1 Jimmy Robertson
- Stuart Bingham 3–0 Joe O'Connor
- Jak Jones 2–3 Jackson Page
- Mark Selby 3–2 Jimmy Robertson
- Matthew Selt 3–2 Joe O'Connor
- Mark Selby 0–3 Stuart Bingham
- Jak Jones 3–1 Jimmy Robertson
- Jak Jones 3–0 Stuart Bingham
- Mark Selby 3–1 Jackson Page

=== Group 4 table ===
Pos	Player	Pld	W	L	FF	FA	FD	
1	Stuart Bingham (ENG)	6	5	1	15	7	+8	Qualification to Group 4 play-off
2	Joe O'Connor (ENG)	6	4	2	14	11	+3	Qualification to Group 4 play-off
3	Mark Selby (ENG) (W)	6	4	2	14	12	+2	Qualification to Group 4 play-off
4	Jak Jones (WAL)	6	3	3	14	11	+3	Qualification to Group 4 play-off
5	Matthew Selt (ENG)	6	3	3	13	13	0	Advanced into Group 5
6	Jimmy Robertson (ENG)	6	1	5	10	16	−6	Eliminated from the competition
7	Jackson Page (WAL)	6	1	5	7	17	−10	Eliminated from the competition

Source: Group 4 results from snooker.org and championshipleaguesnooker.co.uk
(W) Group winner

=== Group 4 play-offs ===
Semi-finals; Best of 5 frames
Stuart Bingham (ENG)	2
Jak Jones (WAL)	3
Joe O'Connor (ENG)	1
Mark Selby (ENG)	3

Final; Best of 5 frames
Jak Jones (WAL)	0
Mark Selby (ENG)	3

== Group 5 ==
Group 5 was played on 20 and 21 January 2025. At the end of the first day, Judd Trump led the group with four wins in four matches. Matthew Selt won the group and qualified for the Winners' Group. There were 33 century breaks made in Group 5, the highest of which was a 138 made by Joe O'Connor. Jak Jones surpassed Selt's record of 23 for the most century breaks in a professional tournament (made at the 2023 tournament); at the conclusion of Group 5 Jones had made 26 in this event.

=== Group 5 league matches ===
==== 20 January ====
- Judd Trump 3–1 Tom Ford
- Neil Robertson 3–2 Matthew Selt
- Jak Jones 3–1 Joe O'Connor
- Judd Trump 3–1 Stuart Bingham
- Tom Ford 3–0 Neil Robertson
- Matthew Selt 2–3 Joe O'Connor
- Jak Jones 3–0 Stuart Bingham
- Judd Trump 3–0 Neil Robertson
- Stuart Bingham 3–2 Joe O'Connor
- Tom Ford 1–3 Matthew Selt
- Neil Robertson 0–3 Joe O'Connor
- Judd Trump 3–1 Jak Jones

==== 21 January ====
- Tom Ford 3–2 Joe O'Connor
- Judd Trump 2–3 Matthew Selt
- Jak Jones 3–1 Neil Robertson
- Stuart Bingham 2–3 Matthew Selt
- Tom Ford 1–3 Stuart Bingham
- Judd Trump 3–2 Joe O'Connor
- Jak Jones 3–0 Matthew Selt
- Jak Jones 3–1 Tom Ford
- Neil Robertson 3–1 Stuart Bingham

=== Group 5 table ===
Pos	Player	Pld	W	L	FF	FA	FD	
1	Judd Trump (ENG)	6	5	1	17	8	+9	Qualification to Group 5 play-off
2	Jak Jones (WAL)	6	5	1	16	6	+10	Qualification to Group 5 play-off
3	Matthew Selt (ENG) (W)	6	3	3	13	14	−1	Qualification to Group 5 play-off
4	Joe O'Connor (ENG)	6	2	4	13	14	−1	Qualification to Group 5 play-off
5	Tom Ford (ENG)	6	2	4	10	14	−4	Advanced into Group 6
6	Stuart Bingham (ENG)	6	2	4	10	15	−5	Eliminated from the competition
7	Neil Robertson (AUS)	6	2	4	7	15	−8	Eliminated from the competition

Source: Group 5 results from snooker.org and championshipleaguesnooker.co.uk
(W) Group winner

=== Group 5 play-offs ===
Semi-finals; Best of 5 frames
Judd Trump (ENG)	3
Joe O'Connor (ENG)	2
Jak Jones (WAL)	1
Matthew Selt (ENG)	3

Final; Best of 5 frames
Judd Trump (ENG)	0
Matthew Selt (ENG)	3

== Group 6 ==
Group 6 was played on 22 and 23 January 2025. At the end of the first day, Joe O'Connor led the group with four wins in four matches. O'Connor missed the final black of an attempted maximum break in his match against Tom Ford. Jack Lisowski also missed the final black of an attempted maximum break in his match against Jak Jones. Judd Trump won the group and qualified for the Winners' Group. There were 24 century breaks made in Group 6, the highest of which was a 143 made by Noppon Saengkham.

Note: At the conclusion of Group 6 Jones had participated in all groups, losing in the play‑offs in Groups 1‍–‍5. He made 32 century breaks, a record for professional tournaments.

=== Group 6 league matches ===
==== 22 January ====
- David Gilbert 1–3 Noppon Saengkham
- Judd Trump 3–2 Jack Lisowski
- Tom Ford 1–3 Joe O'Connor
- Judd Trump 3–1 Jak Jones
- David Gilbert 3–1 Jack Lisowski
- Noppon Saengkham 0–3 Joe O'Connor
- Judd Trump 1–3 David Gilbert
- Jak Jones 3–1 Tom Ford
- Jak Jones 0–3 Joe O'Connor
- Jack Lisowski 1–3 Noppon Saengkham
- Judd Trump 3–0 Tom Ford
- David Gilbert 0–3 Joe O'Connor

==== 23 January ====
- Jack Lisowski 0–3 Joe O'Connor
- Judd Trump 3–2 Noppon Saengkham
- Tom Ford 0–3 David Gilbert
- Jak Jones 3–1 Noppon Saengkham
- Judd Trump 1–3 Joe O'Connor
- Jak Jones 1–3 Jack Lisowski
- Tom Ford 1–3 Noppon Saengkham
- Jak Jones 1–3 David Gilbert
- Tom Ford 3–0 Jack Lisowski

=== Group 6 table ===
Pos	Player	Pld	W	L	FF	FA	FD	
1	Joe O'Connor (ENG)	6	6	0	18	2	+16	Qualification to Group 6 play-off
2	Judd Trump (ENG) (W)	6	4	2	14	11	+3	Qualification to Group 6 play-off
3	David Gilbert (ENG)	6	4	2	13	9	+4	Qualification to Group 6 play-off
4	Noppon Saengkham (THA)	6	3	3	12	12	0	Qualification to Group 6 play-off
5	Jak Jones (WAL)	6	2	4	9	14	−5	Advanced into Group 7
6	Jack Lisowski (ENG)	6	1	5	7	16	−9	Eliminated from the competition
7	Tom Ford (ENG)	6	1	5	6	15	−9	Eliminated from the competition

Source: Group 6 results from snooker.org and championshipleaguesnooker.co.uk
(W) Group winner

=== Group 6 play-offs ===
Semi-finals; Best of 5 frames
Joe O'Connor (ENG)	3
Noppon Saengkham (THA)	2
Judd Trump (ENG)	3
David Gilbert (ENG)	1

Final; Best of 5 frames
Joe O'Connor (ENG)	0
Judd Trump (ENG)	3

== Group 7 ==
Group 7 was played on 24 and 25 January 2025. At the end of the first day, Xiao Guodong and Ricky Walden led the group with three wins each. Xiao won the group and qualified for the Winners' Group. There were 16 century breaks made in Group 7, the highest of which was a maximum break made by David Gilbert, the third 147 of his career, in his 3‍–‍1 league match win over Zhou Yuelong.

Note: Fan Zhengyi was due to play in Group 7 but withdrew and was replaced by Walden.
Note: Jak Jones played one match, then subsequently withdrew and did not compete further. He was not replaced by another player, and the group continued as a six‑player group with the match already played by Walden against Jones declared void.

=== Group 7 league matches ===
==== 24 January ====
- Xiao Guodong 3–1 Zhou Yuelong
- Xiao Guodong 3–1 Noppon Saengkham
- David Gilbert 3–1 Joe O'Connor
- Zhou Yuelong 1–3 Ricky Walden
- Xiao Guodong 1–3 Ricky Walden
- Noppon Saengkham 3–0 Joe O'Connor
- David Gilbert 1–3 Noppon Saengkham
- Xiao Guodong 3–2 Joe O'Connor
- David Gilbert 2–3 Ricky Walden

Result not counted after Jones's withdrawal:

- Jak Jones 0–3 Ricky Walden

Matches not played:

- Jak Jones v David Gilbert
- Jak Jones v Zhou Yuelong

==== 25 January ====
- Noppon Saengkham 1–3 Ricky Walden
- Zhou Yuelong 3–0 Joe O'Connor
- Noppon Saengkham 2–3 Zhou Yuelong
- Xiao Guodong 3–1 David Gilbert
- David Gilbert 3–1 Zhou Yuelong
- Joe O'Connor 2–3 Ricky Walden

Matches not played:

- Xiao Guodong v Jak Jones
- Jak Jones v Noppon Saengkham
- Jak Jones v Joe O'Connor

=== Group 7 table ===
Pos	Player	Pld	W	L	FF	FA	FD	
1	Ricky Walden (ENG)	5	5	0	15	7	+8	Qualification to Group 7 play-off
2	Xiao Guodong (CHN) (W)	5	4	1	13	8	+5	Qualification to Group 7 play-off
3	Noppon Saengkham (THA)	5	2	3	10	10	0	Qualification to Group 7 play-off
4	David Gilbert (ENG)	5	2	3	10	11	−1	Qualification to Group 7 play-off
5	Zhou Yuelong (CHN)	5	2	3	9	11	−2	Eliminated from the competition
6	Joe O'Connor (ENG)	5	0	5	5	15	−10	Eliminated from the competition
7	Jak Jones (WAL)	0	0	0	0	0	0	Withdrew after playing one match

Source: Group 7 results from snooker.org and championshipleaguesnooker.co.uk
(W) Group winner

=== Group 7 play-offs ===
Semi-finals; Best of 5 frames
Ricky Walden (ENG)	2
David Gilbert (ENG)	3
Xiao Guodong (CHN)	3
Noppon Saengkham (THA)	0

Final; Best of 5 frames
David Gilbert (ENG)	2
Xiao Guodong (CHN)	3

== Winners' Group ==
The Winners' Group was played on 4 and 5 February 2025. At the end of the first day, Judd Trump led the group with four wins in four matches. Mark Selby won the group and the tournament, beating Kyren Wilson 3‍–‍0 in the final. There were 24 century breaks made in the Winners' Group, the highest of which was a maximum break made by Selby, the sixth 147 of his career, in his 3‍–‍2 league match win over Xiao Guodong. After the final match, which took only 52 minutes, Selby said: "This event is difficult to win, I'd have been happy to win it once but twice is even better! I played a lot better today compared to yesterday. I scored well when I got my chances and it's nice to beat somebody like Kyren [Wilson]. He's the man of the moment and you get confidence from it."

Note: At the end of play on 4 February, there had been 160 century breaks made at the event. This was a record for professional tournaments, surpassing the 159 made at the 2023 Championship League tournament. At the end of play on 5 February, a total of 177 centuries had been made in the event.

=== Winners' Group league matches ===
==== 4 February ====
- Judd Trump 3–1 Si Jiahui
- Kyren Wilson 0–3 Xiao Guodong
- Judd Trump 3–2 Mark Selby
- Hossein Vafaei 3–0 Matthew Selt
- Kyren Wilson 3–0 Matthew Selt
- Si Jiahui 3–2 Xiao Guodong
- Mark Selby 3–0 Hossein Vafaei
- Judd Trump 3–2 Xiao Guodong
- Kyren Wilson 3–2 Si Jiahui
- Mark Selby 2–3 Matthew Selt
- Xiao Guodong 3–0 Matthew Selt
- Judd Trump 3–2 Hossein Vafaei

==== 5 February ====
- Judd Trump 3–0 Kyren Wilson
- Si Jiahui 1–3 Matthew Selt
- Xiao Guodong 0–3 Hossein Vafaei
- Kyren Wilson 1–3 Mark Selby
- Judd Trump 3–2 Matthew Selt
- Mark Selby 3–2 Si Jiahui
- Kyren Wilson 3–1 Hossein Vafaei
- Mark Selby 3–2 Xiao Guodong
- Si Jiahui 0–3 Hossein Vafaei

=== Winners' Group table ===
Pos	Player	Pld	W	L	FF	FA	FD	
1	Judd Trump (ENG)	6	6	0	18	9	+9	Qualification to Winners' Group play-off
2	Mark Selby (ENG) (W)	6	4	2	16	11	+5	Qualification to Winners' Group play-off
3	Hossein Vafaei (IRN)	6	3	3	12	9	+3	Qualification to Winners' Group play-off
4	Kyren Wilson (ENG)	6	3	3	10	12	−2	Qualification to Winners' Group play-off
5	Xiao Guodong (CHN)	6	2	4	12	12	0	Eliminated from the competition
6	Matthew Selt (ENG)	6	2	4	8	15	−7	Eliminated from the competition
7	Si Jiahui (CHN)	6	1	5	9	17	−8	Eliminated from the competition

Source: Winners' Group results from snooker.org and championshipleaguesnooker.co.uk
(W) Group winner

=== Winners' Group play-offs ===
Semi-finals; Best of 5 frames
Judd Trump (ENG)	0
Kyren Wilson (ENG)	3
Mark Selby (ENG)	3
Hossein Vafaei (IRN)	1

Final; Best of 5 frames
Kyren Wilson (ENG)	0
Mark Selby (ENG)	3

== Final ==
Final
Final: Best of 5 frames. Referee: Natalia Gradinari; Leicester Arena, Leicester, England, 5 February 2025.
Kyren Wilson; England	0–3	Mark Selby; England
Frame scores: 11–103, 1–62, 0–100 (100)
(frame 1) 6	Highest break	100 (frame 3)
0	Century breaks	1

== Century breaks ==
A total of 177 (Note: Number of century breaks for each group: Group 1: 19; Group 2: 15; Group 3: 20; Group 4: 26; Group 5: 33; Group 6: 24; Group 7: 16; Winners' Group: 24.) (Note: Players who made seven or more centuries: Jak Jones: 32; Judd Trump: 23; Mark Selby: 18; Joe O'Connor: 12; Matthew Selt: 11; Xiao Guodong: 11; Stuart Bingham: 9; David Gilbert: 7; Hossein Vafaei: 7.) century breaks were made during the tournament.

- **147** (W), 141, **140** (3), 135, 134, 134, 129, 127, 125, 120, 120, 120, 111, 110, 107, 105, 100, 100 – Mark Selby
- **147** (2), 139, **135** (1), 135, 134, 134, 129, 127, 127, 127, 126, 126, 126, 124, 120, 119, 117, 116, 115, 115, 115, 113, 113, 109, 109, 107, 106, 103, 103, 102, 101, 100 – Jak Jones
- **147** (7), 135, 133, 124, 120, 101, 100 – David Gilbert
- **143** (4), 136, 133, 126, 121, 121, 120, 110, 103 – Stuart Bingham
- 143, 133, 132, 104, 101, 100 – Si Jiahui
- **143** (6) – Noppon Saengkham
- 140, 139, 138, 136, 135, 134, 130, 127, 120, 119, 113, 112, 108, 107, 106, 106, 105, 104, 103, 103, 103, 101, 100 – Judd Trump
- 140, **138** (5), 138, 134, 128, 127, 119, 117, 116, 111, 106, 103 – Joe O'Connor
- 140, 116, 103 – Jack Lisowski
- 137, 107, 104 – Tom Ford
- 135, 131 – Zhou Yuelong
- 135, 130, 128, 128, 123, 122, 105, 101, 100, 100, 100 – Xiao Guodong
- 134, 122, 121, 101 – Ryan Day
- 134, 116, 110 – Ali Carter
- 131, 113 – Robert Milkins
- 130, 120, 113, 101 – Kyren Wilson
- 130, 117, 102 – Ricky Walden
- 129, 129, 121, 121, 119, 117, 101 – Hossein Vafaei
- 129, 123, 111, 105, 105, 104, 103, 102, 102, 102, 100 – Matthew Selt
- 128, 106, 101 – Ronnie O'Sullivan
- 127, 125, 124, 110, 104 – Pang Junxu
- 124, 116, 106, 105, 104 – Chris Wakelin
- 111 – Elliot Slessor
- 101 – Jimmy Robertson
- 100 – Neil Robertson

Note: Bold = highest break in the indicated group.

== Winnings ==
No.	Player	1	2	3	4	5	6	7	W	Total
1	Mark Selby (ENG) (5)			**3,600**	6,200				**16,000**	25,800
2	Jak Jones (WAL) (18)	**5,000**	**5,400**	4,400	4,300	2,900	900	0		22,900
3	Judd Trump (ENG) (1)					4,600	6,200		6,600	17,400
4	Kyren Wilson (ENG) (2)			6,400					7,900	14,300
5	Hossein Vafaei (IRN) (26)	6,200							5,700	11,900
6	Joe O'Connor (ENG) (37)				2,700	**3,400**	4,700	500		11,300
7	Matthew Selt (ENG) (33)				1,300	6,100			1,600	9,000
8	Xiao Guodong (CHN) (17)							6,100	2,400	8,500
9	Si Jiahui (CHN) (13)		6,400						1,800	8,200
10	David Gilbert (ENG) (21)						2,600	**5,000**		7,600
11	Ali Carter (ENG) (11)		2,800	2,500						5,300
=	Noppon Saengkham (THA) (28)						**3,300**	2,000		5,300
13	Chris Wakelin (ENG) (15)	1,100	2,800	1,100						5,000
14	Stuart Bingham (ENG) (24)				**3,600**	1,000				4,600
15	Ryan Day (WAL) (29)	2,600	1,000							3,600
16	Pang Junxu (CHN) (27)	2,700	700							3,400
=	Ricky Walden (ENG) (38)							3,400		3,400
18	Robert Milkins (ENG) (23)		1,100	1,000						2,100
19	Tom Ford (ENG) (19)					1,000	600			1,600
20	Gary Wilson (ENG) (16)	1,000								1,000
=	Elliot Slessor (ENG) (31)	1,000								1,000
=	Ronnie O'Sullivan (ENG) (3)			1,000						1,000
=	Jimmy Robertson (ENG) (36)				1,000					1,000
24	Zhou Yuelong (CHN) (32)							900		900
25	Jackson Page (WAL) (35)				700					700
=	Neil Robertson (AUS) (20)					700				700
=	Jack Lisowski (ENG) (22)						700			700
	Total prize money:	19,600	20,200	20,000	19,800	19,700	19,000	17,900	42,000	178,200

Green: Won the Group.
Bold: Highest break in the Group.
Numbers in parentheses: World ranking prior to tournament start, 3 January 2025.
All prize money in GBP. (Note: Source (championshipleaguesnooker.co.uk) does not include high-break prize money in totals.)
Players receive prize money for frames won in voided matches
even though they do not count in the group tables.
