= Hawth Theatre =

Theater in Crawley, England

Coordinates: 51°06′42″N 0°10′28″W

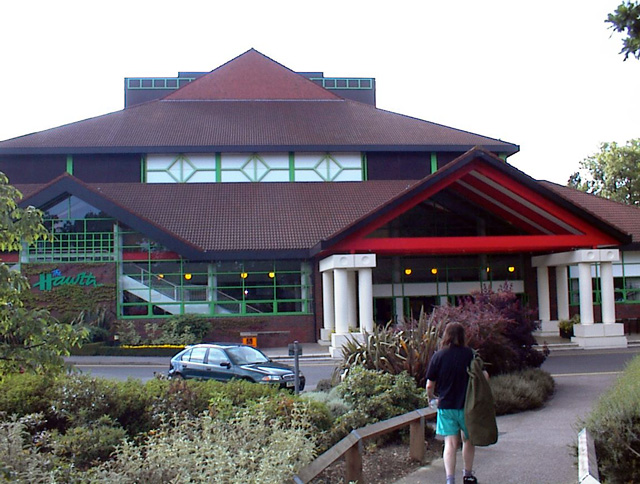
Hawth Theatre

The Hawth Theatre is an arts and entertainment complex located in 38 acres (150,000 m^{2}) of woodland about 0.5 mi (800 m) from the town centre of the English town of Crawley. It is wholly owned by Crawley Borough Council and is currently operated by Parkwood Theatres.

== History ==
The new town of Crawley had been without a theatre since its inception in 1947, leading, in part, a local newspaper editor to describe the town as soulless. In 1986, plans were approved by the borough council for a new theatre in an area of woodland known locally as The Hawth. Development began quickly, and the theatre opened for the first time in April 1988. In 1992, the theatre hosted a performance of London City Ballet's Romeo and Juliet, which was attended by the then Her Royal Highness Diana, Princess of Wales.

== Facilities ==
=== Main auditorium ===
The main auditorium seats up to 855 for performances, and can be converted to an exhibition or conference venue. The stage is around 21 metres (69 ft) wide, with a depth of 13 metres (43 ft), and is equipped to a high standard with sound, lighting and staging facilities.

=== Studio ===
The Studio provides a smaller performance space, seating 146 people which hosts small-scale contemporary dance, theatre, jazz, blues, folk and comedy. The space can be used in a flat-floor format so can be converted for film previews, club nights, cabaret seated events, workshops and rehearsals.

=== Amphitheatre ===
There is an amphitheatre performance area in the woodland at the rear of the theatre, where summer productions are performed, including productions of Shakespeare and children's theatre, as well as being used during the Crawley Folk Festival and Crawley International Mela.

=== Other facilities ===
Other performance spaces include a permanent foyer exhibition space, an on-site restaurant as well as two bars. Also during the summer a marquee is erected on the lawns to host Crawley Folk Festival, Crawley Mela and world music performances.

== Programme ==
The theatre is mainly used to house touring productions, and has in the past seen presentations across a range of types, from movies to opera. The theatre also housed its own resident production company - Shaker Productions - in the 1990s. It now plays home to Pitchy Breath Theatre Company - a group committed to producing one newly written piece each year. In addition, other events have visited the Hawth, ranging from circus and juggling conventions, to the hustings for conservative party leader elections in 2001.
