= 2025 Champion of Champions =

Snooker tournament

2025 Sportsbet.io Champion of Champions

Tournament information
- Dates: 10–16 November 2025
- Venue: Leicester Arena
- City: Leicester
- Country: England
- Organisation: Matchroom Sport
- Format: Non-ranking event
- Total prize fund: £440,000
- Winner's share: £150,000
- Highest break: Mark Selby (ENG) (138)

Final
- Champion: Mark Selby (ENG)
- Runner-up: Judd Trump (ENG)
- Score: 10–5

The 2025 Champion of Champions (officially the 2025 Sportsbet.io Champion of Champions) was a professional non-ranking snooker tournament that took place from 10 to 16 November 2025 at the Leicester Arena in Leicester, England. It featured 16 participants, all of whom had won significant tournaments since the previous year's event. Part of the 2025–26 snooker season, it was the 15th edition of the Champion of Champions since the tournament was first held in 1978 and the 13th consecutive edition since it was revived in 2013. It was broadcast domestically by ITV4 and internationally by other broadcasters. The winner received £150,000 from a total prize fund of £440,000.

Mark Williams was the defending champion, having defeated Xiao Guodong 10–6 in the 2024 final, but he lost 5–‍6 to Mark Selby in the quarter-finals. Selby defeated Judd Trump 10–5 in the final to win the tournament for the first time. Trump lost his fifth Champion of Champions final out of the six he had contested. The tournament produced 23 century breaks, of which the highest was a 138 by Selby in the final.

== Overview ==
The Champion of Champions is a professional non-ranking snooker tournament that was first held in 1978, when it was contested by four players at the Wembley Conference Centre in London. The inaugural winner was Ray Reardon, who defeated Alex Higgins 11–9 in the final. After its second staging in 1980, the tournament was not held again until 2013, since which time it has been staged annually. As of 2025, the most successful player in its history was Ronnie O'Sullivan, who had won the title four times and been runner-up twice.

The 2025 edition of the tournament—the 15th staging overall and the 13th consecutively since its revival in 2013—took place from 10 to 16 November 2025 at the Leicester Arena in Leicester, England. It featured 16 participants, 14 winners of events from the previous 12 months on the World Snooker Tour in addition to the reigning World Women's Snooker Champion and World Seniors Champion. Organised by Matchroom Sport, the tournament was sponsored by sports betting company Sportsbet.io. Mark Williams was the defending champion, having defeated Xiao Guodong 10–6 in the 2024 final.

=== Format ===
The 16 qualifiers were split into four groups of four players. Each group competed on a different day, with the group finals (event quarter-finals) played on the same day as the corresponding first-round matches. The opening group matches were played as the best of 7 frames, while the group finals and semi-finals were the best of 11 frames. The final was the best of 19 frames, played over two sessions.

=== Qualification ===
Players qualified by winning events throughout the previous year. A dispute arose over the qualification criteria after Matchroom Sport announced a preliminary lineup for the tournament on 20 October that did not include the reigning World Seniors Champion Alfie Burden but did include the highest ranked player in the snooker world rankings who had not otherwise qualified, which would have been the world number five O'Sullivan. Noting that the World Seniors Champion had been invited to the tournament every year since the 2019 event, the World Seniors Tour chairman Jason Francis claimed that Burden had a contractual right to play. Burden was subsequently featured in the confirmed field of participants, released on 30 October. O'Sullivan (who had not won a title over the previous year, having claimed his most recent title at the 2024 World Masters of Snooker in March 2024) was not included.

The full list of competitors is below. Events shown below in grey are for players who had already qualified for the event.

Qualification table
Tournament	Date of tournament final	Winner
2024 Champion of Champions	17 November 2024	Mark Williams (WAL)
2024 UK Championship	1 December 2024	Judd Trump (ENG)
2025 Masters	19 January 2025	Shaun Murphy (ENG)
2025 World Championship	5 May 2025	Zhao Xintong (CHN)
2024 Riyadh Season Snooker Championship	20 December 2024	Mark Allen (NIR)
2025 World Open	1 March 2025	John Higgins (SCO)
2025 World Grand Prix	21 January 2025	Neil Robertson (AUS)
2025 German Masters	2 February 2025	Kyren Wilson (ENG)
2025 Players Championship	23 March 2025	Kyren Wilson (ENG)
2025 Championship League (invitational)	5 February 2025	Mark Selby (ENG)
2025 Tour Championship	6 April 2025	John Higgins (SCO)
2025 Championship League (ranking)	23 July 2025	Stephen Maguire (SCO)
2025 Saudi Arabia Snooker Masters	16 August 2025	Neil Robertson (AUS)
2025 Wuhan Open	30 August 2025	Xiao Guodong (CHN)
2025 Xi'an Grand Prix	13 October 2025	Mark Williams (WAL)
2024 Scottish Open	15 December 2024	Lei Peifan (CHN)
2025 English Open	21 September 2025	Mark Allen (NIR)
2025 Welsh Open	16 February 2025	Mark Selby (ENG)
2025 Northern Ireland Open	26 October 2025	Jack Lisowski (ENG)
2025 British Open	28 September 2025	Shaun Murphy (ENG)
2025 World Women's Championship	27 May 2025	Bai Yulu (CHN)
2025 Shanghai Masters	3 August 2025	Kyren Wilson (ENG)
2024 Shoot Out	7 December 2024	Tom Ford (ENG)
2025 World Seniors Championship	11 May 2025	Alfie Burden (ENG)

Player also qualified by winning another tournament

=== Broadcasters ===
The tournament was broadcast domestically in the United Kingdom on ITV4. It was broadcast on DAZN in Germany; on Viaplay in Iceland, the Netherlands, and Scandinavia; on Maincast in Ukraine; on AMC Network in Hungary; on TV Nova in the Czech Republic and Slovakia; on Sportklub in Bosnia and Herzegovina, Croatia, Macedonia, Montenegro, Serbia, Kosovo, and Slovenia; on TV3 in Estonia, Latvia, and Lithuania; on BG Sports in Thailand; on Rigour Media in China; on StarHub in Singapore; on FanDuel in the United States; on Fox Sports in Australia; and on Sky Network in New Zealand. In territories without a broadcast option, the tournament was streamed on the Matchroom Pool channel on YouTube.

=== Prize fund ===
The breakdown of prize money for this event is shown below:

- Winner: £150,000
- Runner-up: £60,000
- Semi-final: £30,000
- Group runner-up: £17,500
- Group semi-final: £12,500
- Total: £440,000

== Summary ==
=== Group stages ===
==== Group 2 ====
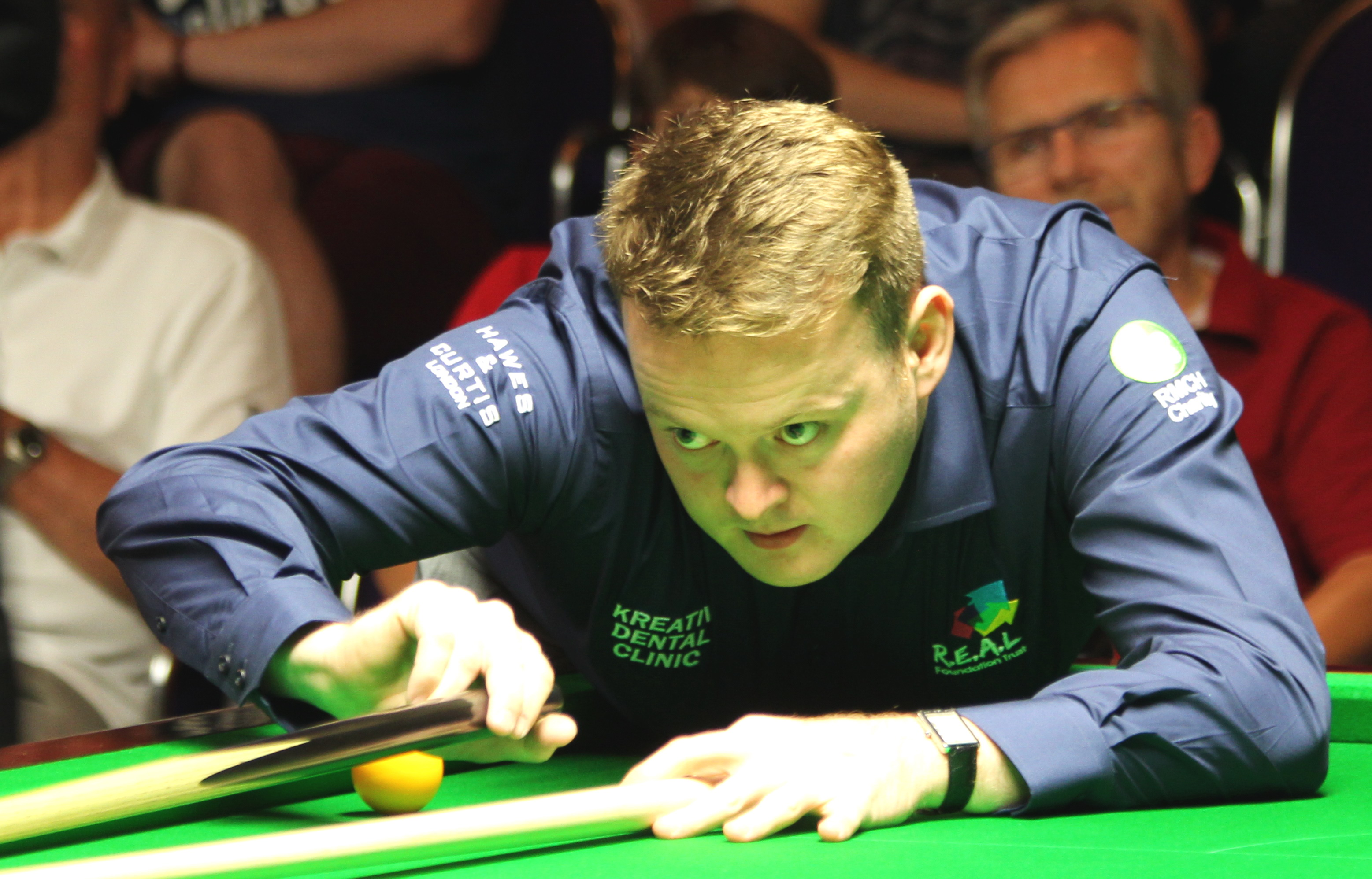
Shaun Murphy (pictured in 2015) complained of "despicable" treatment by tournament organisers after losing to Lei Peifan in the first match of the event.

The tournament began on 10 November with the matches from Group 2, which comprised Shaun Murphy, Lei Peifan, Judd Trump, and Bai Yulu. In the first group semi-final, the 2025 Masters champion Murphy faced the 2024 Scottish Open champion Lei, who won the first frame with a 72 break and also took the second. Murphy won frame three, but Lei moved 3–1 ahead with a 61 break in frame four and completed a 4–1 win in frame five. Following the match, Murphy criticised the tournament organisers, Matchroom Sport, for scheduling his match on the first day of the tournament, since he had just returned from the 2025 International Championship in China. "The way I've been treated by Matchroom in this tournament is nothing short of despicable," Murphy said, claiming he had been informed of the match schedule just 48 hours previously, midway through a 36-hour trip from China. Murphy stated that players who had not travelled to the International Championship should have been scheduled to play first in the event. The organisers responded that the match schedule had been based on the players' seedings. "Scheduling is always a challenge every year, but we take on board the points and always strive to improve for next year and the future," Matchroom Sport said in a statement. In the second group semi-final, the 2024 UK Championship winner Trump faced the 2025 World Women's Championship winner Bai. She took the first frame, but Trump then won four consecutive frames, making breaks including 50, 84, and 71, as he also secured a 4–1 victory.

In the Group 2 final, Trump won the first frame with a 60 break, and Lei took the second with a century of 101. Trump then won four consecutive frames, making another 60 break in frame five, as he took a 5–1 lead. Lei won frame seven with a 72 break, but Trump completed a 6–2 victory with a 71 break in frame eight. "It's always a great feeling to get off to a strong start in this event," said Trump afterwards. "Every player in the field is capable of beating anyone, so you have to be sharp from the very first frame. I felt good out there today, found my rhythm early, and hopefully I can carry that form through the rest of the week."

==== Group 3 ====
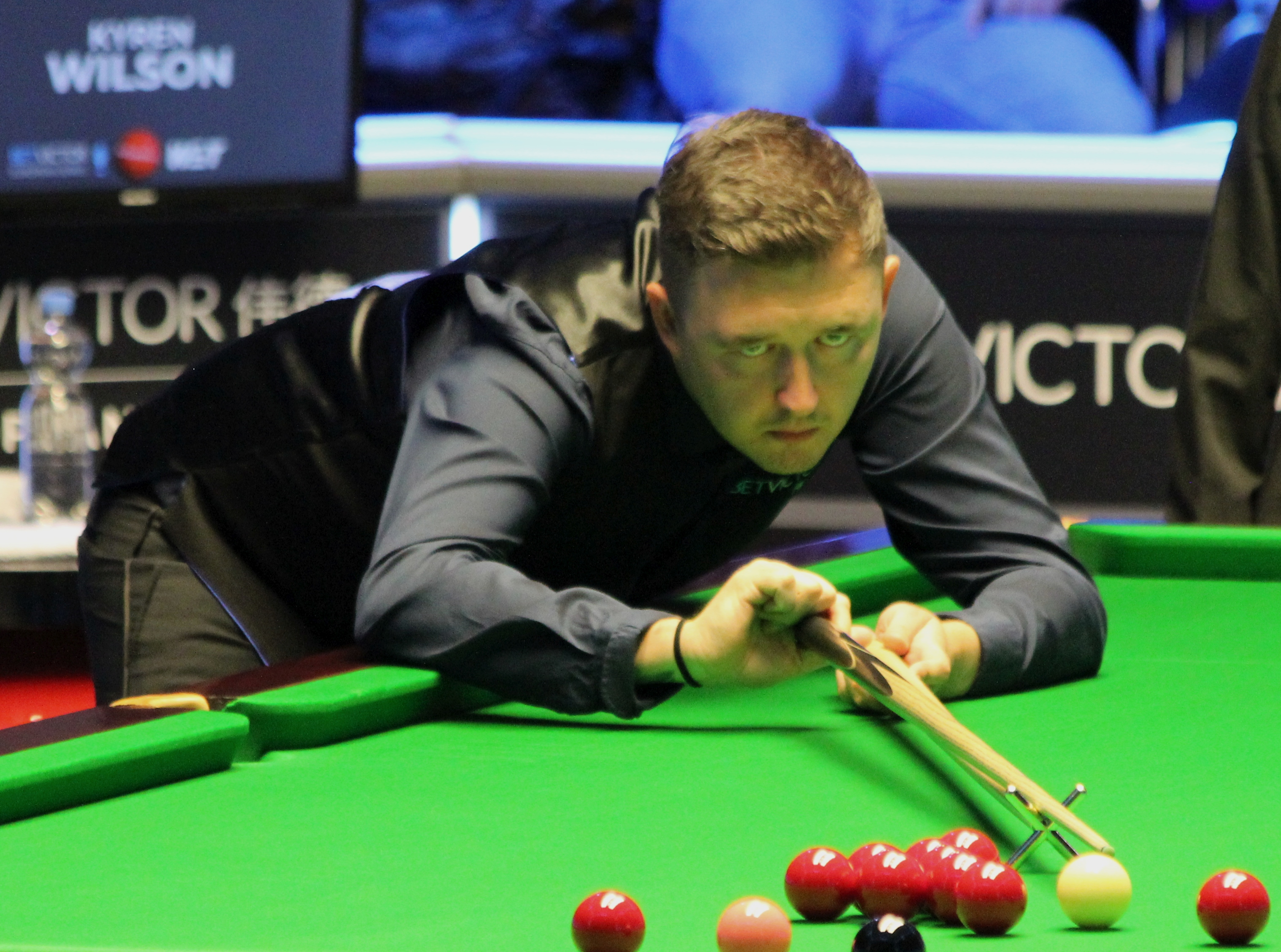
Kyren Wilson (pictured in 2022) lost the Group 3 final to Zhao Xintong on the last black ball of a deciding frame.

Matches in Group 3, which comprised Zhao Xintong, Mark Allen, Jack Lisowski, and Kyren Wilson, took place on 11 November. In the first group semi-final, the 2025 Shanghai Masters champion Wilson faced the 2025 Northern Ireland Open champion Lisowski. Wilson made breaks including 88, 115, and 60 as he moved into a 3–0 lead, but Lisowski responded with breaks including 61 and 115 as he tied the scores at 3–3. Wilson won the deciding frame with a century of 122. In the second group semi-final, the 2025 English Open winner Allen scored only one point in the match as the reigning World Champion Zhao made breaks including 60, 78, and 76 to record a whitewash victory. Zhao had returned from China that morning, having reached the semi-finals of the International Championship.

In the Group 3 final, Zhao made breaks of 73, 99, and 78 as he took a 3–1 lead, but Wilson won four frames in a row, making breaks of 104, 62, 120, and 88, as he moved 5–3 ahead. Zhao then won two consecutive frames with breaks of 136 and 64 to tie the scores at 5–5. Zhao went ahead in the decider with a 58 break, but Wilson responded with a 54, and the match was decided on the last black ball. After Wilson missed a pot to the corner pocket, the black travelled twice across the table and stopped in the jaws of the same pocket. Zhao potted the black to secure victory. "I just tried my best out there and I'm really happy with how I played today," Zhao said afterwards. "I missed a few shots and [Wilson] took full advantage to go 5–3 ahead. I didn't want to let him win too easily — I wanted to make it a real battle. I just kept fighting, stayed focused, and managed to come back. I was a bit lucky in the last two frames, especially with the final black, but sometimes you need that."

==== Group 1 ====
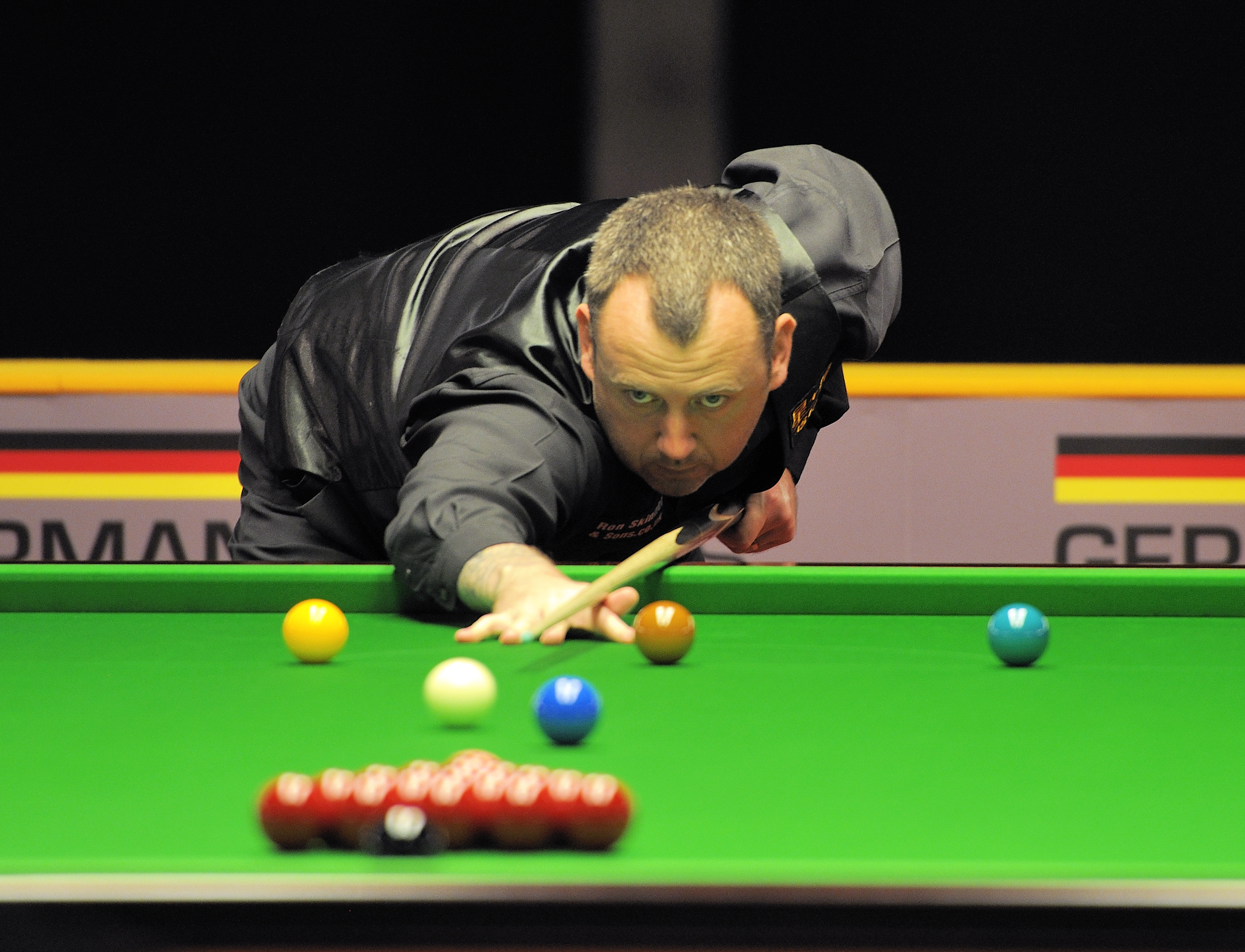
The defending champion Mark Williams (pictured in 2014) lost the Group 1 final to Mark Selby in a decider.

Matches in Group 1, which comprised the defending champion Mark Williams, Mark Selby, Stephen Maguire, and Alfie Burden, took place on 12 November. In the first group semi-final, the 2025 Xi'an Grand Prix winner Williams made breaks including 83 and 70 as he whitewashed the 2025 World Seniors Champion Burden. In the second group semi-final, the 2025 Welsh Open champion Selby made a century of 122 as he also whitewashed the 2025 Championship League winner Maguire.

In the Group 1 final, Williams won the first two frames, making breaks of 77 and 114, before Selby won three frames in a row, producing breaks including 55, 136, and 52, as he moved 3–2 ahead. In frame six, Selby was 68 points behind and required a snooker, but he secured the penalty points he needed and went on to win a fourth consecutive frame for a 4–2 lead. Williams took frame seven with a 66 break and won two more closely contested frames to lead 5–4, but Selby tied the scores at 5–5 with a 95 break and secured victory with a 55 break in the deciding frame. "It was a mad match, really," said Selby afterwards. "I felt good early on and managed to get in front, but [Williams] dug deep like he always does. Towards the end I probably over-thought a few shots and started to feel a bit frazzled, but I just tried to stay strong and keep fighting. To get over the line here in front of the home crowd means a lot."

==== Group 4 ====
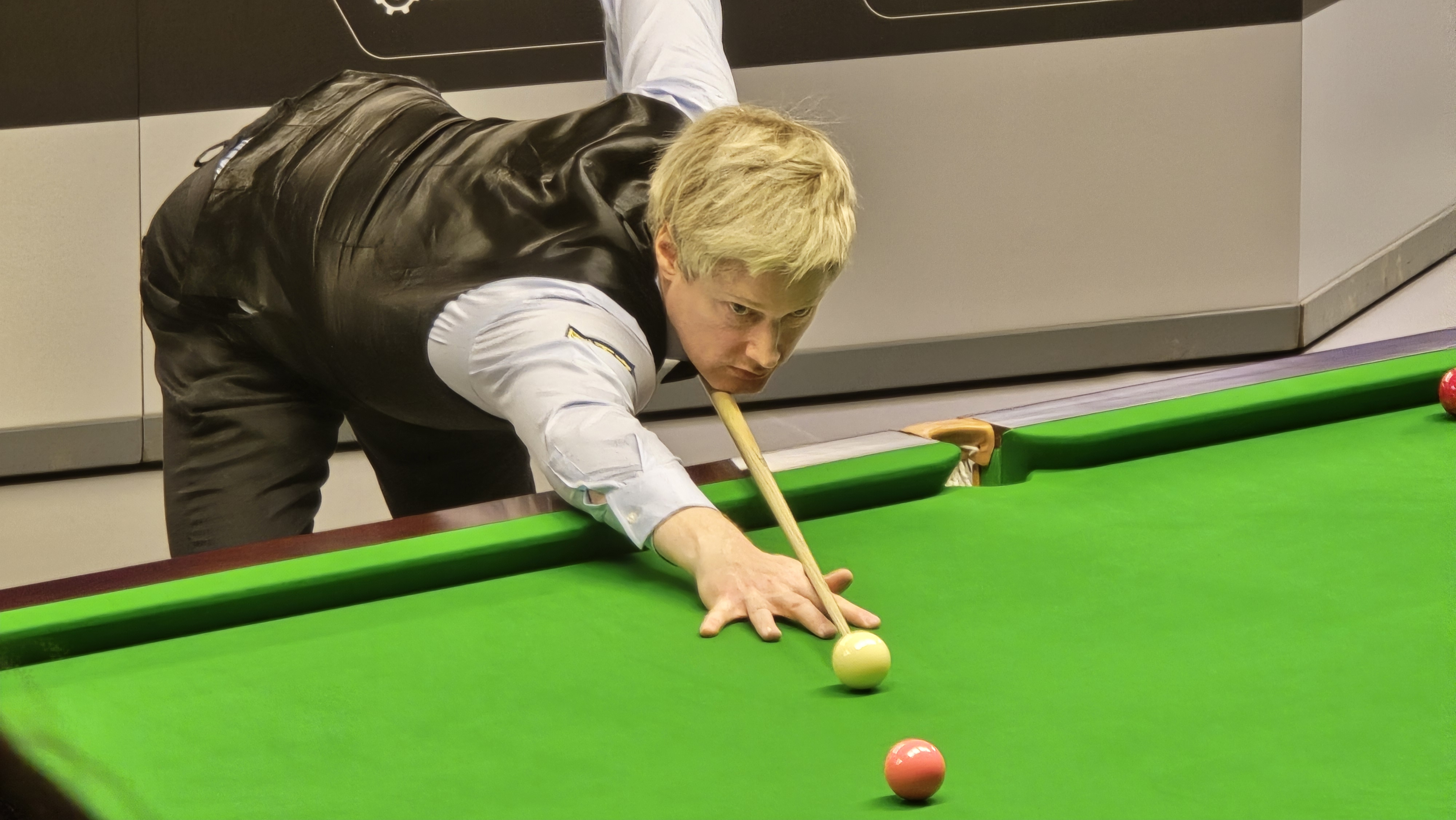
Neil Robertson (pictured in 2025) defeated John Higgins 6–4 in the Group 4 final, winning frame 10 on the last black.

Matches in Group 4, which comprised Neil Robertson, John Higgins, Xiao Guodong, and Tom Ford, took place on 13 November. In the first group semi-final, the 2025 World Grand Prix champion Robertson made breaks including 90 and 92 as he opened up a 3–0 lead over the 2024 Shoot Out winner Ford. A break of 97 gave Ford the fourth frame, but Robertson completed a 4–1 victory with a century of 101 in frame five. In the other group semi-final, the 2025 World Open winner Higgins faced the 2025 Wuhan Open winner Xiao. Higgins made a 59 break to win the opening frame, but Xiao took the second with an 89 break. Higgins moved ahead with a century of 119 in the third, but Xiao won the fourth to tie the scores at 2–2. Xiao took the lead with a century of 132 in frame five, but Higgins won frame six and then secured victory in the deciding frame.

In the Group 4 final, Robertson took the opening frame with an 83 break, but Higgins made a 91 break to win the second. A century of 127 gave Robertson the third frame, but Higgins took the fourth with an 81 break to tie the scores at 2–2. After the mid-session interval, Robertson won two consecutive frames with breaks of 115 and 64 to lead 4–2. Higgins won frame seven with an 86 break, but Robertson made a 62 in frame eight to move one from victory at 5–3. Higgins won the ninth frame with a 79 break and took a 61-point lead in the tenth, but Robertson recovered to win the frame on the last black and complete a 6–4 victory. "I felt really good out there today," Robertson said afterwards. "It was a tough one for [Higgins] because I thought he played well, but a couple of narrow misses cost him at important times. We both made errors, as you do in a match of that intensity, but overall it was a really high-quality battle."

=== Semi-finals ===
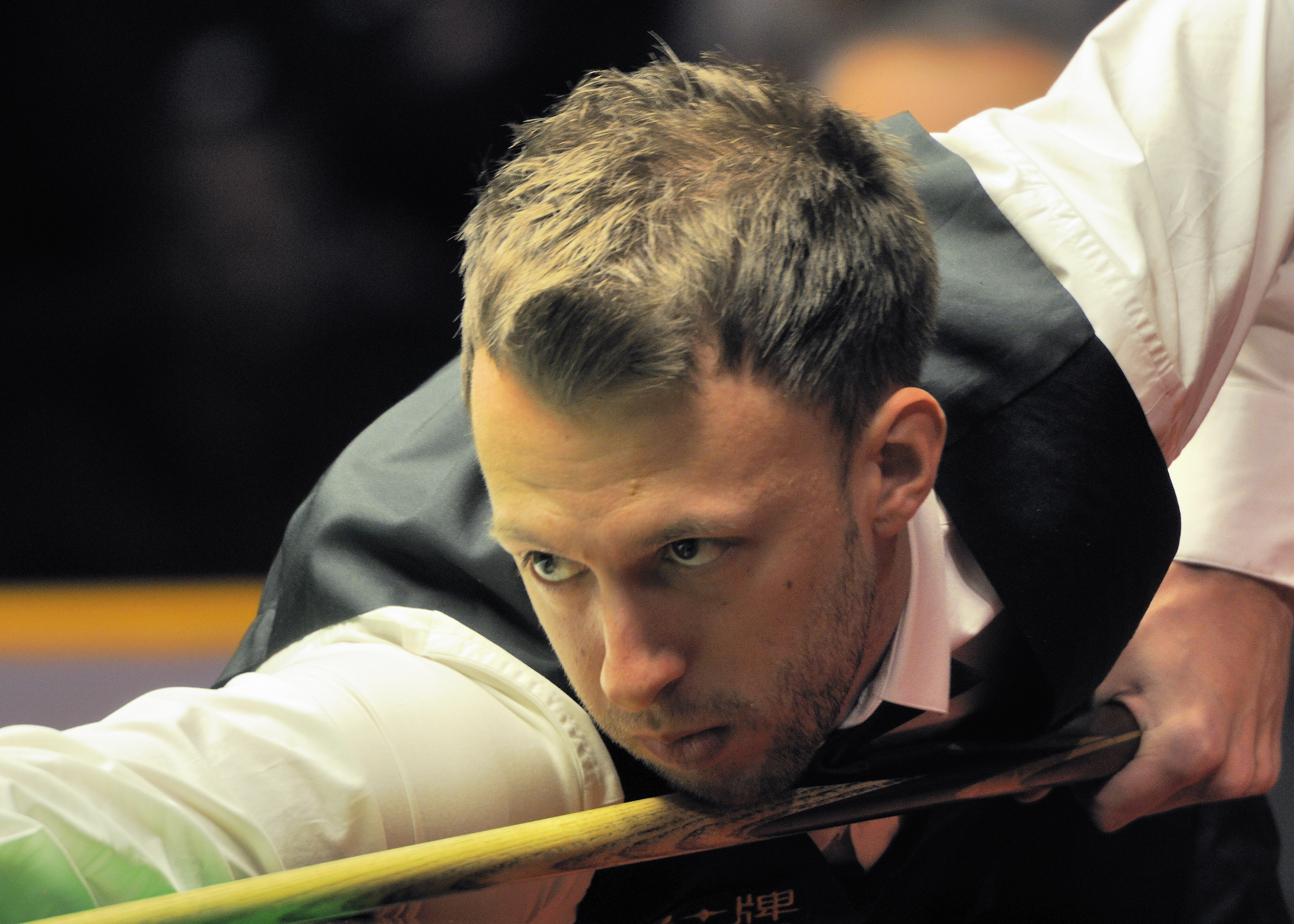
The world number one Judd Trump (pictured in 2014) defeated the reigning World Champion Zhao Xintong to reach his sixth Champion of Champions final.

The world number one Trump faced the reigning World Champion Zhao in the first semi-final on 14 November. Zhao won the first two frames with breaks of 50 and 72, but Trump took the next five frames, making breaks including 68, 73, 77, and 66, as he moved 5–2 ahead. In frame eight, Trump made a 38 break before missing a red, and Zhao produced a break of 30 before also missing a red. Trump then compiled a 63 break to win a sixth consecutive frame, completing a 6–2 victory. "From 2–0 I felt I controlled the game," Trump said afterwards. "I scored heavily and didn't miss much." Trump added that changing his ferrule from brass to titanium had left him struggling that season. "I don't feel comfortable or fluent," he said. "I really have to take care over every shot." Explaining the change, Trump said that he wanted to be able to play the same shots in tournaments around the world, regardless of local conditions.

Robertson faced Selby in the second semi-final on 15 November. Selby won the opening frame and then made a century of 127 to take the second. Robertson won frame three, but Selby produced breaks including 57 and 80 to take frames four and five and move 4–1 ahead. Robertson won frame six with a century of 104. Frame seven lasted 63 minutes, concluding with a lengthy duel on the last black, which Selby eventually potted to take a 5–2 lead. Selby made a 62 break in the 45-minute eighth frame, which he won on the colours to complete a 6–2 victory. "I knew I'd have to be at my absolute best to beat [Robertson], and I felt really sharp out there tonight," Selby said afterwards. "Once I got in front, I managed the game well and kept control."

=== Final ===
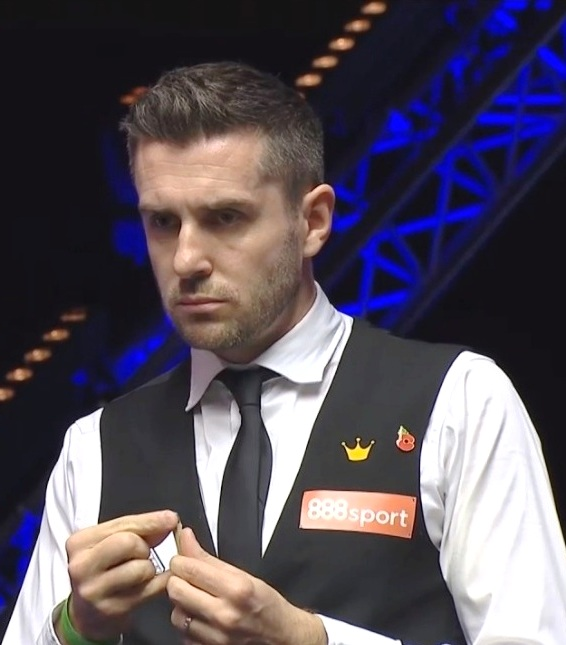
Mark Selby (pictured in 2020) defeated Judd Trump in the final to win the Champion of Champions for the first time.

The final was played on 16 November as the best of 19 frames, held over two sessions, between Trump and Selby. Trump contested his sixth Champion of Champions final, having previously won the title at the 2021 event and been runner-up on four other occasions. Selby reached the final of the event for the first time, following three previous defeats at the semi-final stage. Trump won the first frame with a century of 111, but Selby responded with a century of 102 to take the second. Trump won two frames in a row with breaks of 73 and 114 to lead 3–1 at the mid-session interval, but Selby then won four consecutive frames, making breaks including 70, 99, 65, and 64 as he moved into a 5–3 lead. Trump made a 71 break to win the ninth and last frame of the session, which ended 5–4 in favour of Selby.

When play resumed for the second session, Trump made a 61 break in frame 10, which he eventually won after a 25-minute safety battle over the last red, tying the scores at 5–5. Frame 11 featured 25 safety shots on one red in the pack and eventually went to Selby, who also won frame 12 after a safety battle on the last pink. Selby then made three consecutive centuries of 138, 101, and 132 to secure a 10–5 victory and his first Champion of Champions title. It was his first professional title since winning the 2025 Welsh Open nine months earlier. "This event is only for the best players and it was a privilege to play [Trump] in the final," said Selby afterwards. "I played well from start to finish and I knew I had to because [Trump] is the man to beat. I have felt good about my game for the last few days, I have found something and I know I have to stick with it. It's a while since I have felt like that so it was great to play to that standard in a big final." After losing his fifth Champion of Champions final out of the six he had played, Trump commented: "I couldn't win with that cue. I gave it my all today, but I just can't get used to it. I didn't know where to aim. There are no excuses, and congratulations to [Selby] because he was the best player all week and deserved to win. He scored very heavily, his safety was good and he showed why he is one of the all-time greats."

== Tournament draw ==
The draw for the tournament is shown below. Numbers in parentheses after the players' names denote the top four seeded players, and players in bold denote match winners.

**Group semi-finals** **(last 16)**; Best of 7 frames
**Mark Williams (WAL) (1)**	**4**
Alfie Burden (ENG)	0
**Group 1**
**Mark Selby (ENG)**	**4**
Stephen Maguire (SCO)	0
**Neil Robertson (AUS) (4)**	**4**
Tom Ford (ENG)	1
**Group 4**
**John Higgins (SCO)**	**4**
Xiao Guodong (CHN)	3
**Kyren Wilson (ENG) (3)**	**4**
Jack Lisowski (ENG)	3
**Group 3**
Mark Allen (NIR)	0
**Zhao Xintong (CHN)**	**4**
Shaun Murphy (ENG)	1
**Lei Peifan (CHN)**	**4**
**Group 2**
**Judd Trump (ENG) (2)**	**4**
Bai Yulu (CHN)	1

**Group finals** **(quarter-finals)**; Best of 11 frames
Mark Williams (WAL) (1)	5
**Mark Selby (ENG)**	**6**
**Neil Robertson (AUS) (4)**	**6**
John Higgins (SCO)	4
Kyren Wilson (ENG) (3)	5
**Zhao Xintong (CHN)**	**6**
Lei Peifan (CHN)	2
**Judd Trump (ENG) (2)**	**6**

**Semi-finals**; Best of 11 frames
**Mark Selby (ENG)**	**6**
Neil Robertson (AUS) (4)	2
Zhao Xintong (CHN)	2
**Judd Trump (ENG) (2)**	**6**

**Final**; Best of 19 frames
**Mark Selby (ENG)**	**10**
Judd Trump (ENG) (2)	5

=== Final: frame scores ===
Final: Best of 19 frames. Referee: Tatiana Woollaston; Leicester Arena, Leicester, England, 16 November 2025
**Mark Selby**; England	**10**–5	Judd Trump (2); England
Afternoon: 0–**111** (111), **102**–0 (102), 12–**73**, 0–**127** (114), **83**–29, **99**–3, **102**–29, **64**–2, 33–**71**; Evening: 32–**85**, **90**–20, **66**–51, **138**–4 (138), **101**–1 (101), **136**–0 (132)
(frame 13) **138**	Highest break	114 (frame 4)
**4**	Century breaks	2

== Century breaks ==
A total of 23 century breaks were made during the tournament.

- 138, 136, 132, 127, 122, 102, 101 – Mark Selby
- 136 – Zhao Xintong
- 132 – Xiao Guodong
- 127, 115, 104, 101 – Neil Robertson
- 122, 120, 115, 104 – Kyren Wilson
- 119 – John Higgins
- 115 – Jack Lisowski
- 114, 111 – Judd Trump
- 114 – Mark Williams
- 101 – Lei Peifan
