= Snooker at the 2025 World Games – women's six-red =

Competition at the 2025 World Games

Women's six-red snooker at the 2025 World Games
- Venue: CAFUC Tianfu Arena, Chengdu, China
- Dates: 10–13 August 2025
- Competitors: 8

Medalists
gold medal	Bai Yulu (CHN)
silver medal	Narucha Phoemphul (THA)
bronze medal	Ploychompoo Laokiatphong (THA)

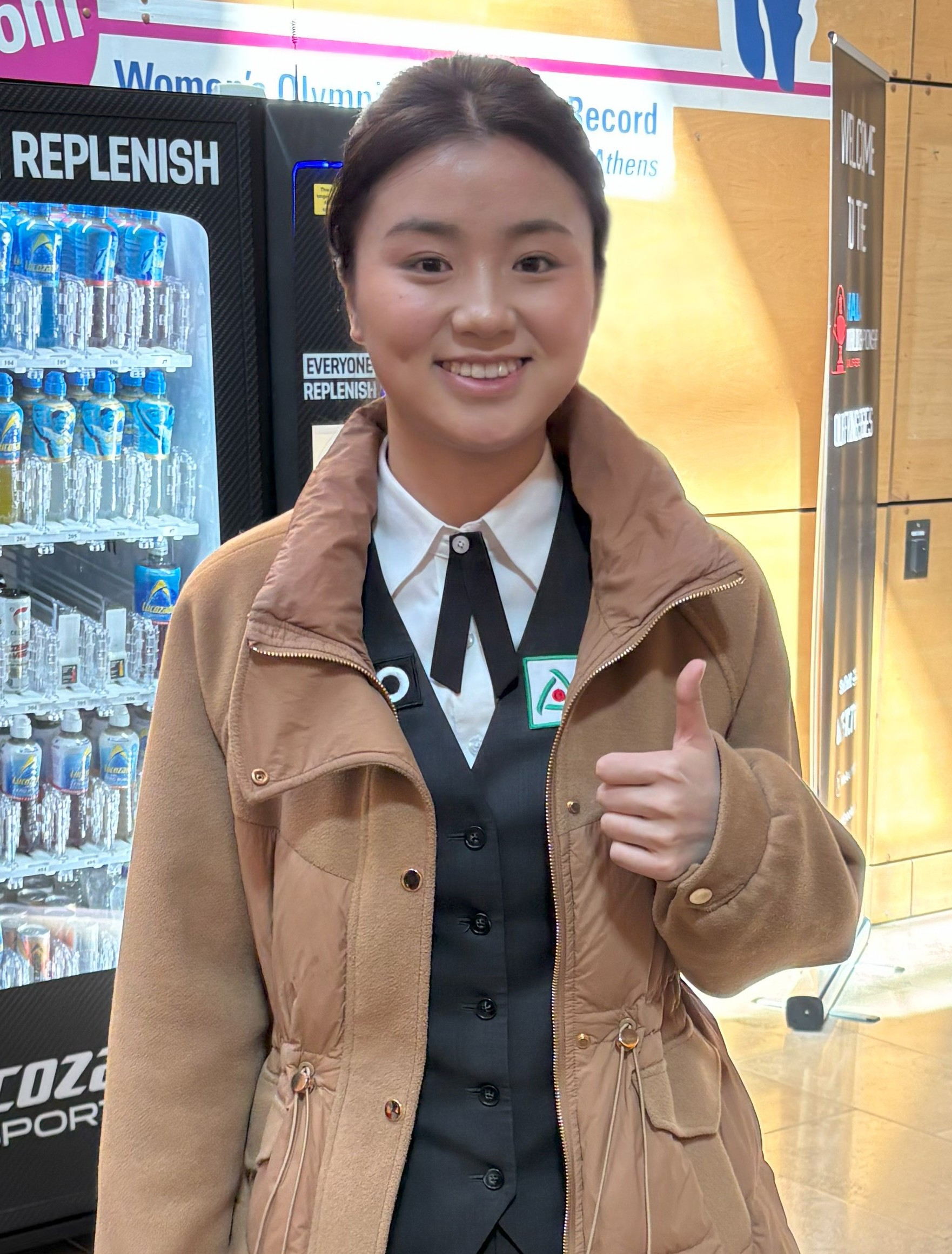
Bai Yulu won the gold medal

The women's singles six-red snooker competition at the 2025 World Games took place from 10 to 13 August 2025 at the Civil Aviation Flight University of China's Tianfu Campus Gymnasium, in, Chengdu, China.

Eight players participated, with qualifying from each of two round-robin groups for the semi-finals. Bai Yulu of China won the event by defeating Narucha Phoemphul of Thailand 2–0 in the final. Bai, who was the reigning World Women's Snooker champion, had opted to play at the World Games instead of entering the 2025 Saudi Arabia Snooker Masters.

For the group stage, players were ranked by most points, then by most frames won and then by least frames lost. If these were all equal then the result of the match between the players in question would determine the ranking. In Group A, where three players each won two maatches, Wendy Jans of Belgium qualified on frame difference and Phoemphul qualified ahead of Man Yan So as she had won their match. Ploychompoo Laokiatphong of Thailand won all three of her matches in Group B, and Bai was runner-up.

In the semi-finals, Bai had defeated Jans 2-0 (40–14 and 51–34), and Phoemphul eliminated Laokiatphong by the same match score, winning the frames 37–31 and 47–39. Laokiatphong took the bronze medal by defeating Jans 2–1 after losing the first frame (23–38, 36–15, 45–4). Bai won the first frame of the final against Phoemphul by 42 points to 18, and took the second frame 41–25. For her victory, Bai won China's first ever World Games gold medal in snooker.

== Knockout stage ==
The results of the knockout stage are shown below.

Semi-finals
12 August
Ploychompoo Laokiatphong (THA)	0
Narucha Phoemphul (THA)	2
12 August
Bai Yulu (CHN)	2
Wendy Jans (BEL)	0

Final
13 August
Narucha Phoemphul (THA)	0
Bai Yulu (CHN)	2
Third place
12 August
Ploychompoo Laokiatphong (THA)	2
Wendy Jans (BEL)	1

== Group stage ==
The match result and final tables for the group stages are shown below.

=== Group A ===
Final standings in Group A
Position	Player	Played	Won	Lost	FP	FW	FL	FD	Points	Outome
1	Wendy Jans (BEL)	3	2	1	8	5	3	2	2	Qualified for the semi-finals
2	Narucha Phoemphul (THA)	3	2	1	7	4	3	1	2	Qualified for the semi-finals
3	So Man Yan (HKG)	3	2	1	9	5	4	1	2	Eliminated from the competition
4	Natasha Chethan (IND)	3	0	3	8	2	6	−4	0	Eliminated from the competition

Matches in Group A
Player	Score	Player
So Man Yan (HKG)	2–1	Natasha Chethan (IND)
Wendy Jans (BEL)	2–0	Narucha Phoemphul (THA)
So Man Yan (HKG)	2–1	Wendy Jans (BEL)
Narucha Phoemphul (THA)	2–0	Natasha Chethan (IND)
Narucha Phoemphul (THA)	2–1	So Man Yan (HKG)
Wendy Jans (BEL)	2–1	Natasha Chethan (IND)

=== Group B ===
Final standings in Group B
Position	Player	Played	Won	Lost	FP	FW	FL	FD	Points	Outcome
1	Ploychompoo Laokiatphong (THA)	3	3	0	7	6	1	5	3	Qualified for the semi-finals
2	Bai Yulu (CHN)	3	2	1	7	4	3	1	2	Qualified for the semi-finals
3	Narantuya Bayarsaikhan (MNG)	3	1	2	7	3	4	−1	1	Eliminated from the competition
4	Fong Mei Mei (HKG)	3	0	3	7	1	6	−5	0	Eliminated from the competition

Matches in Group B
Player	Score	Player
Bai Yulu (CHN)	2–1	Fong Mei Mei (HKG)
Ploychompoo Laokiatphong (THA)	2–1	Narantuya Bayarsaikhan (MNG)
Narantuya Bayarsaikhan (MNG)	2–0	Fong Mei Mei (HKG)
Ploychompoo Laokiatphong (THA)	2–0	Bai Yulu (CHN)
Ploychompoo Laokiatphong (THA)	2–0	Fong Mei Mei (HKG)
Bai Yulu (CHN)	2–0	Narantuya Bayarsaikhan (MNG)
