= 2025 World Women's Snooker Championship =

Women's snooker tournament

Tournament information
- Dates: 20–27 May 2025
- Venue: Changping Gymnasium
- City: Dongguan
- Country: China
- Organisation: World Women's Snooker; CBSA
- Total prize fund: £39,500
- Winner's share: £12,000
- Highest break: Bai Yulu (CHN) (112)

Final
- Champion: Bai Yulu (CHN)
- Runner-up: Mink Nutcharut (THA)
- Score: 6–4

The 2025 World Women's Snooker Championship was a women's snooker tournament that took place from 20 to 27 May 2025 at the Changping Gymnasium in Dongguan, China. It was organised by World Women's Snooker and the Chinese Billiards and Snooker Association (CBSA).

Bai Yulu was the defending champion, having defeated Mink Nutcharut 6–5 in the 2024 final. For the first time in the tournament's history, the semi-finals did not feature an English player. Bai reached her third consecutive final, where she again faced Mink, and defeated her 6–4. Bai became the seventh multiple winner of the tournament, after Vera Selby, Allison Fisher, Karen Corr, Kelly Fisher, Reanne Evans, and Ng On-yee. Bai was the first player to successfully defend the title since Ng in 2018 and the first maiden winner to do so since Evans in 2006. Mink lost her third world final out of the four she had contested. Because Mink and Bai already held professional tour cards, Evans and Ng, the two other highest-ranked players in the women's world rankings, received two-year tour cards to begin in the 2025–26 season.

The World Women's Under-21 Championship and World Women's Seniors Championship were staged alongside the main tournament. Bai was ineligible to defend the under-21 title she had won the previous year, having turned 21 in the interim. Panchaya Channoi, aged 16, won the under-21 title with a 3–1 victory over Liu Zi Ling in the final. Tessa Davidson retained her seniors title, defeating Han Fang 3–1 in the final. It was Davidson's third seniors title in four years.

== Overview ==
=== Background ===
The Women's Professional Snooker Championship was held ten times between 1934 and 1950, with no tournaments staged between 1941 and 1947. Ruth Harrison won eight of those ten events. The Women's World Open, first held in 1976, is recognised as the beginning of the modern World Women's Snooker Championship. Reanne Evans holds the record for the most wins, having won 12 titles, including ten consecutive victories from 2005 to 2014.

Organised by World Women's Snooker, the Chinese Billiards and Snooker Association, and Cantonese Snooker, the 2025 edition took place from 20 to 27 May 2025 at the Changping Gymnasium in Dongguan, China. The winner received the Mandy Fisher trophy. There were eleven nations represented between the 74 players who entered the 2025 edition.

Bai Yulu was the defending champion, having defeated Mink Nutcharut 6–5 in the 2024 final.

=== Format ===
The players were drawn in 15 groups, each containing up to five players. The top two players from each group, and two best placed third players across the groups, qualified for the knockout stage. Group matches were played over the best of five frames. The first knockout rounds were the best of 5 frames, the second round and quarter-finals were the best of 7 frames, and the final was the best of 11 frames. The group stages were played from 20 to 23 May, after which the knockout stages took place. The final was held on 27 May.

=== Prize fund ===
The winner of the event received £12,000. The breakdown of prize money is shown below:

- Winner: £12,000
- Runner-up: £5,500
- Semi-finalists: £2,500
- Quarter-finalists: £1,500

== Summary ==
=== Last 32 ===
The last-32 matches were played as the best of 5 frames. Mink Nutcharut produced breaks of 30, 31, and 55 as she whitewashed Enmiaoer Li. Natcharin Sornprasert won the first frame, but Deng Xin Shun won the next three to advance to the next round. Wing man Shiu potted balls in every frame, but she was whitewashed by Anupama Ramachandran. Phakwalan Kongkaew compiled a 34 break in the first frame, the highest of the match, but was defeated 1–3 by Jessica Woods. Man Yan So and Narucha Phoemphul were tied both at 1–1 and 2–2, with Phoemphul winning the deciding frame. Rebecca Kenna produced breaks of 41, 32, and 34 to defeat Yuk Fan Lau 3–1. Baipat Siripaporn made a half-century as she whitewashed Yee Ting Cheung. Lu Zhao won the first frame of her match against Ploychompoo Laokiatphong, who then compiled a break of 47 in the second to level the scores. Lu took frames three and four to progress.

Ng On-yee compiled breaks of 41 and 45 as she whitewashed He Danni. The match between Yee Ki Ho and Jaique Ip went to a decider, which Ho won helped by a 41 break. Tessa Davidson produced a half-century of 56 to take a 2–1 lead, but Panchaya Channoi forced a decider and won it. Bai Yulu produced a break of 89 as she defeated Liu Zi Ling 3–1. Amee Kamani made breaks of 37, 62, and 39 in a whitewash defeat of Bai Ya Ru. Narantuya Bayarsaikhan whitewashed Katrina Wan and Xia Yuyin did the same to Charlene Chai, making a 70 break in frame two. Reanne Evans compiled a half-century in the first frame against Yang Meng and went on to win 3–1.

=== Last 16 ===
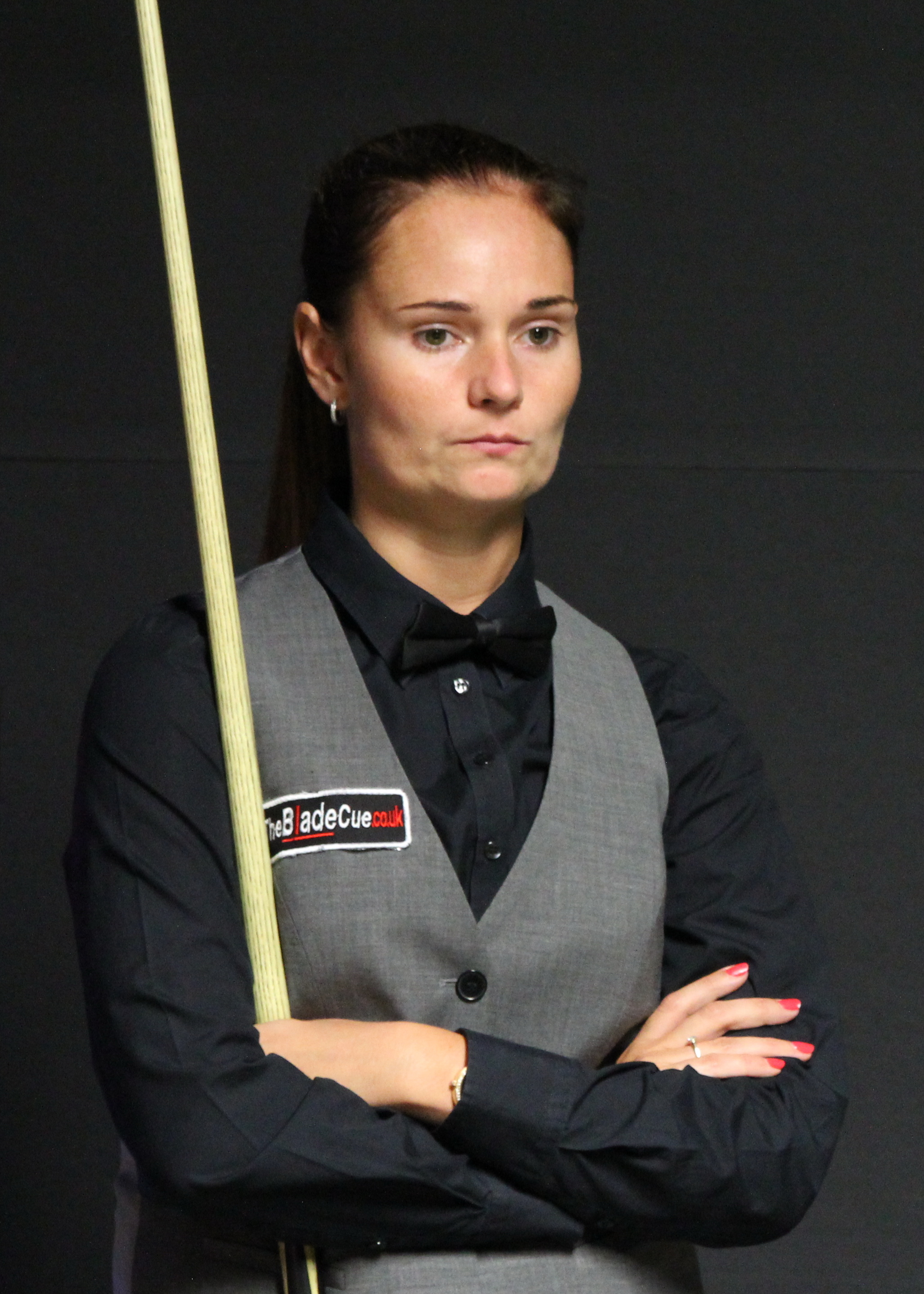
Reanne Evans, who had never lost before the quarter-finals of a World Women's Snooker Championship, was defeated in the last 16 by Xia Yuyin.

The last-16 matches were played as the best of 7 frames. Facing Nutcharut, Deng built a 2–0 lead. Nutcharut produced breaks of 65, 39, 92, and 31 as she won four consecutive frames for victory. Ramachandran defeated Woods 4–1. Phoemphul recovered from 0–2 behind to level the scores, but Kenna won the last two frames of the match to progress. Siripaporn took four frames in a row for victory against Lu.

Ng won the first frame against Ho with a 52 break and then extended her lead to 3–0. Ho won frame four to reduce the deficit, but Ng claimed victory in the fifth. Channoi produced breaks of 74 and 69, but she was defeated 2–4 by Bai, who made breaks of 57 and 88. Bayarsaikhan recovered from a two-frame deficit to tie the match, but Kamani won frames five and six to progress. Xia produced a 68 break in taking a 3–0 lead against 12-time champion Evans. Evans won the fourth frame, but after Evans missed potting the yellow ball in frame 5, Xia went on to win the frame on the final pink ball for a 4–1 victory. Evans had previously never lost before the quarter-finals of a women's world championship.

=== Quarter-finals ===
The quarter-finals were played as the best of 7 frames. Nutcharut whitewashed Ramachandran, making breaks of 34 and 47. Victory allowed Nutcharut to end the season as the world number one. The first four frames of the match between Kenna and Siripaporn were share, but Siripaporn took frames five and six for a 2–4 victory. Ng won the first frame against Bai with a 62 break, but Bai compiled breaks of 33, 45, 54, 41, and 82 to win four of the next five for victory. Xia built a 3–0 lead, featuring breaks of 45 and 38. Kamani took the next frame, but Xia sealed victory in the fifth.

=== Semi-finals ===
The semi-finals were played as the best of 9 frames. For the first time in the tournament's history, the semi-finals did not feature an English player. Playing in the semi-finals of a World Championship for the first time, Xia faced Bai, undefeated in the last fifteen matches of the tournament. Bai compiled breaks of 38, 31, 38, and 43 as she recorded a whitewash victory.

Nutcharut faced Siripaporn, who was playing at this stage of the tournament for the third time in her career. The pair had already met in the semi-finals of the 2023 edition. Nutcharut built a 2–0 lead, making a 47 break in the second frame. In the third, Siripaporn compiled a half-century, the highest break of the match, but Nutcharut took it as well and then added the fourth. Trailing 0–4, Siripaporn won the following frame, but Nutcharut produced a 34 break in frame six to progress to the final with a 5–1 result.

=== Final ===
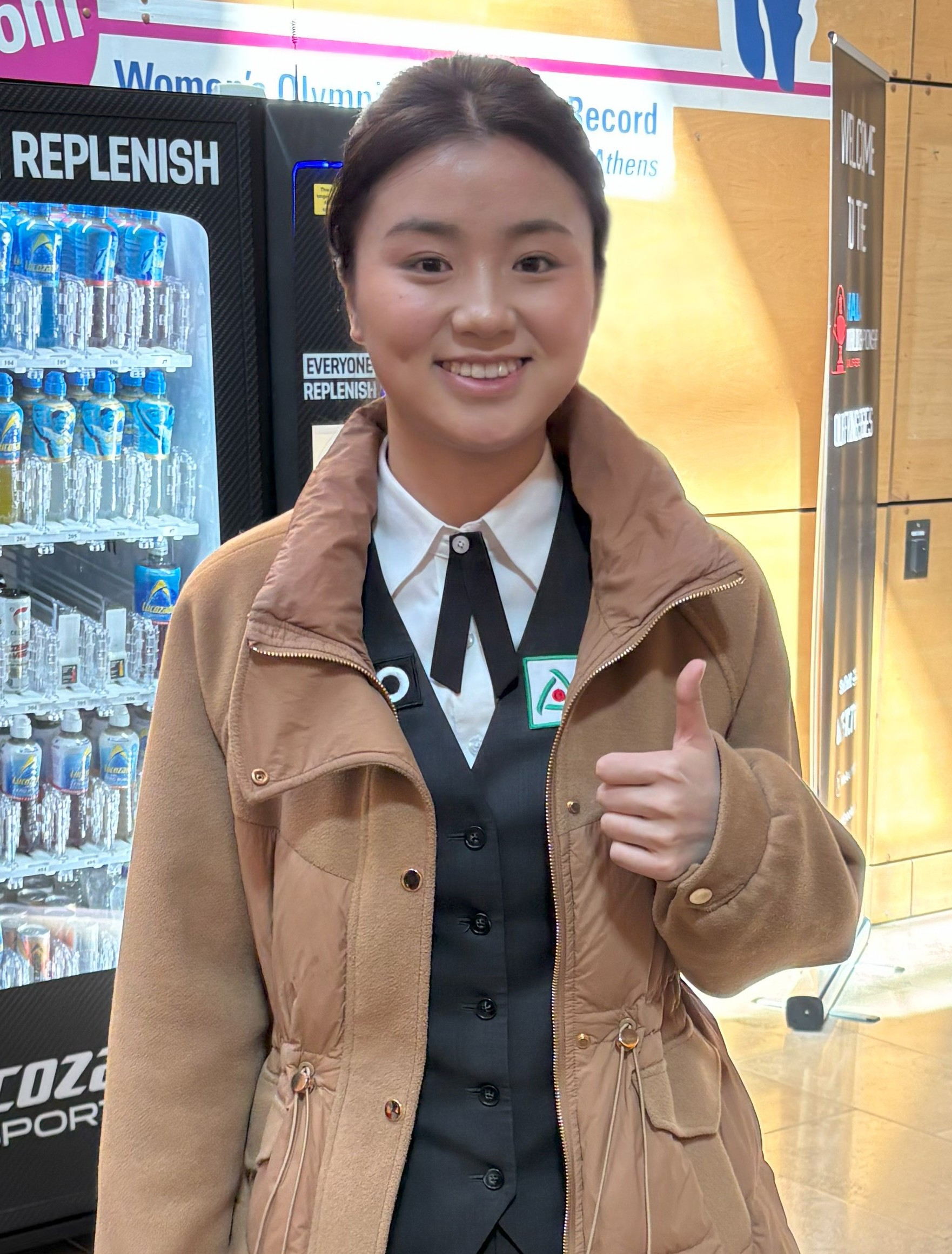
Bai Yulu retained the title that she won in 2024.

Bai reached her third consecutive final, where she again faced Mink. Both players were seeking their second World Women's Snooker Championship title. The final was played as the best of 11 frames. Bai won the first frame by a single point, but Mink took the next three frames, with the third and fourth being close. After Bai won the fifth frame, Mink compiled a break of 54 in the sixth frame to move 4-2 ahead. Bai levelled the match at 4-4 and moved into the lead for the first time at 5-4 with a break of 61. During the tenth frame, both players missed opportunities. Bai missed hitting the final pink ball completely when attempting a thin cut, which put her a point behind Mink. Mink then potted the pink but the shot was a foul as she went in off. Bai then potted the pink to secure the title. She received the Mandy Fisher trophy and earned £12,000 in prize money. It was the third time that Mink had finished as runner-up in the championship. "I have to smile even if I lose. This is what professionalism is," she said.

Bai became the seventh multiple winner of the tournament, after Vera Selby, Allison Fisher, Karen Corr, Kelly Fisher, Evans, and Ng. Bai was the first player to successfully defend the title since Ng in 2018 and the first maiden winner to do so since Evans in 2006. Mink lost her third world final out of the four she had contested. Because Mink and Bai already held professional tour cards, Evans and Ng, the two other highest-ranked players in the women's world rankings, received two-year tour cards to begin in the 2025–26 season.

=== Side events ===
The World Women's Under-21 Championship and World Women's Seniors Championship were staged alongside the main tournament. Bai was ineligible to defend the under-21 title she had won the previous year, having turned 21 in the interim. Panchaya Channoi, aged 16, won the under-21 title with a 3–1 victory over Liu Zi Ling in the final. Tessa Davidson retained her seniors title, defeating Han Fang 3–1 in the final. It was Davidson's third seniors title in four years.

== Results ==
=== Main event ===
==== Group stage ====
Group standings are shown below.

Group A

Pos.	Player	MP	MW	ML	FW	FL	FA	Qualification
1	Mink Nutcharut (THA)	4	4	0	12	0	3	Progressed to knockout stage
2	Bai Ya Ru (CHN)	4	3	1	9	4	1.25	Progressed to knockout stage
3	Hong lay Toh (SGP)	4	2	2	7	7	0	Eliminated
4	Lynn Shi (CHN)	4	1	3	4	10	-1.5	Eliminated
5	Khaliun Batjambal (MNG)	4	0	4	1	12	-2.75	Eliminated

Group B

Pos.	Player	MP	MW	ML	FW	FL	FA	Qualification
1	Amee Kamani (IND)	4	4	0	12	1	2.75	Progressed to knockout stage
2	Yuk Fan Lau (HKG)	4	3	1	9	4	1.25	Progressed to knockout stage
3	Xiaomin Su (CHN)	4	2	2	8	6	0.5	Eliminated
4	Xuemei Qiu (CHN)	4	1	3	3	10	-1.75	Eliminated
5	Sudtida Yingheng (THA)	4	0	4	1	12	-2.75	Eliminated

Group C

Pos.	Player	MP	MW	ML	FW	FL	FA	Qualification
1	Ng On-yee (HKG)	4	4	0	12	0	3	Progressed to knockout stage
2	Wing man Shiu (HKG)	4	3	1	9	5	1	Progressed to knockout stage
3	Audrey Chua (SGP)	4	2	2	7	8	-0.25	Eliminated
4	Qiuyue Yu (CHN)	4	1	3	6	9	-0.75	Eliminated
5	Wei Lintan (CHN)	4	0	4	0	12	-3	Eliminated

Group D

Pos.	Player	MP	MW	ML	FW	FL	FA	Qualification
1	Baipat Siripaporn (THA)	3	3	0	9	3	2	Progressed to knockout stage
2	Liu Zi Ling (CHN)	3	2	1	8	3	1.67	Progressed to knockout stage
3	Zhenmiao Lin (CHN)	3	1	2	4	6	-0.67	Eliminated
4	Agnes Kimura (NZL)	3	0	3	0	9	-3	Eliminated

Group D

Pos.	Player	MP	MW	ML	FW	FL	FA	Qualification
1	Rebecca Kenna (ENG)	4	4	0	12	4	2	Progressed to knockout stage
2	Panchaya Channoi (THA)	4	3	1	11	4	1.75	Progressed to knockout stage
3	Wang Ruotong (CHN)	4	2	2	8	7	0.25	Eliminated
4	Miina Tani (JAP)	4	1	3	4	10	-1.5	Eliminated
5	Heng Huang (CHN)	4	0	4	2	12	-2.5	Eliminated

Group F

Pos.	Player	MP	MW	ML	FW	FL	FA	Qualification
1	Charlene Chai (SIN)	3	2	1	8	4	1.33	Progressed to knockout stage
2	Narucha Phoemphul (THA)	3	2	1	7	3	1.33	Progressed to knockout stage
3	Yang Meng (CHN)	3	2	1	6	5	0.33	Progressed to knockout stage
4	Xuejun Alice Wu (CHN)	3	0	3	0	9	-3	Eliminated

Group G

Pos.	Player	MP	MW	ML	FW	FL	FA	Qualification
1	Jessica Woods (AUS)	4	4	0	12	2	2.5	Progressed to knockout stage
2	Yee Ki Ho (HKG)	4	3	1	11	3	2	Progressed to knockout stage
3	Jambaa Sosorbaram (MNG)	4	2	2	6	7	-0.25	Eliminated
4	Yang Jiao (CHN)	4	1	3	4	9	-1.25	Eliminated
5	Pornpita Dairueak (THA)	4	0	4	0	12	-3	Eliminated

Group H

Pos.	Player	MP	MW	ML	FW	FL	FA	Qualification
1	Tessa Davidson (ENG)	4	4	0	12	3	2.25	Progressed to knockout stage
2	Phakwalan Kongkaew (THA)	4	3	1	9	6	0.75	Progressed to knockout stage
3	Han Fang (CHN)	4	2	2	8	8	0	Eliminated
4	Sizhe Wang (CHN)	4	1	3	9	9	0	Eliminated
5	Heihera Rehu-Brown (NZL)	4	0	4	0	12	-3	Eliminated

Group I

Pos.	Player	MP	MW	ML	FW	FL	FA	Qualification
1	Man Yan So (HKG)	4	4	0	12	0	3	Progressed to knockout stage
2	Katrina Wan (HKG)	4	3	1	9	3	1.5	Progressed to knockout stage
3	Liu Wei Yi Lu (CHN)	4	2	2	6	6	0	Eliminated
4	Xi Lin (CHN)	4	1	3	3	10	-1.75	Eliminated
5	Thatsonnan Phonsang (THA)	4	0	4	1	12	-2.75	Eliminated

Group J

Pos.	Player	MP	MW	ML	FW	FL	FA	Qualification
1	Reanne Evans (ENG)	4	4	0	12	0	3	Progressed to knockout stage
2	Deng Xin Shuni (CHN)	4	3	1	9	3	1.5	Progressed to knockout stage
3	Ruilan Wu (CHN)	4	2	2	6	6	0	Eliminated
4	Pawarisa Praphassorn (THA)	4	1	3	3	10	-1.75	Eliminated
5	Supita Dairueak (THA)	4	0	4	1	12	-2.75	Eliminated

Group K

Pos.	Player	MP	MW	ML	FW	FL	FA	Qualification
1	Anupama Ramachandran (IND)	4	4	0	12	2	2.5	Progressed to knockout stage
2	Xia Yuyin (CHN)	4	3	1	11	3	2	Progressed to knockout stage
3	Chu Pui Ying (HKG)	4	2	2	6	6	0	Eliminated
4	Yitong Wang (CHN)	4	1	3	3	10	-1.75	Eliminated
5	Thanchanok Promtong (THA)	4	0	4	1	12	-2.75	Eliminated

Group L

Pos.	Player	MP	MW	ML	FW	FL	FA	Qualification
1	Ploychompoo Laokiatphong (THA)	3	3	0	9	0	3	Progressed to knockout stage
2	He Danni (CHN)	3	2	1	6	5	0.33	Progressed to knockout stage
3	Diana Schuler (GER)	3	1	2	5	6	-0.33	Eliminated
4	Weijia Chu (CHN)	3	0	3	0	9	-3	Eliminated

Group M

Pos.	Player	MP	MW	ML	FW	FL	FA	Qualification
1	Bai Yulu (CHN)	4	4	0	12	1	2.75	Progressed to knockout stage
2	Natcharin Sornprasert (THA)	4	3	1	10	4	1.5	Progressed to knockout stage
3	Mo Tian Tian (CHN)	4	2	2	7	7	0	Eliminated
4	Zolboo Unurbayar (MNG)	4	1	3	4	10	-1.5	Eliminated
5	Rita Toamau (NZL)	4	0	4	1	12	-2.75	Eliminated

Group N

Pos.	Player	MP	MW	ML	FW	FL	FA	Qualification
1	Jaique Ip (HKG)	4	3	1	11	3	2	Progressed to knockout stage
2	Yee Ting Cheung (HKG)	4	3	1	9	4	1.25	Progressed to knockout stage
3	Enmiaoer Li (CHN)	4	3	1	10	6	1	Progressed to knockout stage
4	Li Bi Han (CHN)	4	1	3	4	9	-1.25	Eliminated
5	Natchariya Sornprasert (THA)	4	0	4	0	12	-3	Eliminated

Group O

Pos.	Player	MP	MW	ML	FW	FL	FA	Qualification
1	Narantuya Bayarsaikhan (MNG)	3	3	0	9	2	2.33	Progressed to knockout stage
2	Lu Zhao (CHN)	3	1	2	7	7	0	Progressed to knockout stage
3	Anni Liu (CHN)	3	1	2	4	6	-0.67	Eliminated
4	Tan Bee Yen (SGP)	3	1	2	3	8	-1.67	Eliminated
5	~~Chan Wai Lam (HKG)~~	0	0	0	0	0	0	Eliminated

==== Knockout ====
Results from the knockout rounds are shown below. The match winners are shown in bold.

**Last 32**; Best of 5 frames
**Mink Nutcharut (THA)**	**3**
Enmiaoer Li (CHN)	0
**Deng Xin Shuni (CHN)**	**3**
Natcharin Sornprasert (THA)	1
**Anupama Ramachandran (IND)**	**3**
Wing man Shiu (HKG)	0
Phakwalan Kongkaew (THA)	1
**Jessica Woods (AUS)**	**3**
Man Yan So (HKG)	2
**Narucha Phoemphul (THA)**	**3**
Yuk Fan Lau (HKG)	1
**Rebecca Kenna (ENG)**	**3**
**Baipat Siripaporn (THA)**	**3**
Yee Ting Cheung (HKG)	0
**Lu Zhao (CHN)**	**3**
Ploychompoo Laokiatphong (THA)	1
**Ng On-yee (HKG)**	**3**
He Danni (CHN)	0
**Yee Ki Ho (HKG)**	**3**
Jaique Ip (HKG)	2
Tessa Davidson (ENG)	2
**Panchaya Channoi (THA)**	**3**
Liu Zi Ling (CHN)	1
**Bai Yulu (CHN)**	**3**
**Amee Kamani (IND)**	**3**
Bai Ya Ru (CHN)	0
Katrina Wan (HKG)	0
**Narantuya Bayarsaikhan (MNG)**	**3**
Charlene Chai (SIN)	0
**Xia Yuyin (CHN)**	**3**
**Reanne Evans (ENG)**	**3**
Yang Meng (CHN)	1

**Last 16**; Best of 7 frames
**Mink Nutcharut (THA)**	**4**
Deng Xin Shuni (CHN)	2
**Anupama Ramachandran (IND)**	**4**
Jessica Woods (AUS)	1
Narucha Phoemphul (THA)	2
**Rebecca Kenna (ENG)**	**4**
**Baipat Siripaporn (THA)**	**4**
Lu Zhao (CHN)	1
**Ng On-yee (HKG)**	**4**
Yee Ki Ho (HKG)	1
Panchaya Channoi (THA)	2
**Bai Yulu (CHN)**	**4**
**Amee Kamani (IND)**	**4**
Narantuya Bayarsaikhan (MNG)	2
**Xia Yuyin (CHN)**	**4**
Reanne Evans (ENG)	1

**Quarter-finals**; Best of 7 frames
**Mink Nutcharut (THA)**	**4**
Anupama Ramachandran (IND)	0
Rebecca Kenna (ENG)	2
**Baipat Siripaporn (THA)**	**4**
Ng On-yee (HKG)	2
**Bai Yulu (CHN)**	**4**
Amee Kamani (IND)	1
**Xia Yuyin (CHN)**	**4**

**Semi-finals**; Best of 9 frames
**Mink Nutcharut (THA)**	**5**
Baipat Siripaporn (THA)	1
**Bai Yulu (CHN)**	**5**
Xia Yuyin (CHN)	0

**Final**; Best of 11 frames
Mink Nutcharut (THA)	4
**Bai Yulu (CHN)**	**6**

=== Side events ===
==== Seniors ====
Results from the World Women's Seniors Championship are shown below. The match winners are shown in bold.

**Last 16**; Best of 5 frames
**Heng Huang (CHN)**	**3**
Rita Toamau (NZL)	1
**Ruilan Wu (CHN)**	**3**
Jambaa Sosorbaram (MNG)	0
**Agnes Kimura (NZL)**	**3**
Bolortuya Altangerel (MNG)	1
**Han Fang (CHN)**	**3**
Heihera Rehu-Brown (NZL)	0
**Tan Bee Yen (IND)**	**3**
Otgonbayar Jigden (MNG)	1
**Xiaomin Su (CHN)**	**3**
Hong lay Toh (IDN)	0
Xuemei Qiu (CHN)	1
**Diana Schuler (GER)**	**3**

**Quarter-finals**; Best of 5 frames
**Tessa Davidson (ENG)**	**3**
Heng Huang (CHN)	1
**Ruilan Wu (CHN)**	**3**
Agnes Kimura (NZL)	2
**Han Fang (CHN)**	**3**
Tan Bee Yen (IND)	1
**Xiaomin Su (CHN)**	**3**
Diana Schuler (GER)	2

**Semi-finals**; Best of 5 frames
**Tessa Davidson (ENG)**	**3**
Ruilan Wu (CHN)	0
**Han Fang (CHN)**	**3**
Xiaomin Su (CHN)	1

**Final**; Best of 5 frames
**Tessa Davidson (ENG)**	**3**
Han Fang (CHN)	1

==== Under-21 ====
Results from the World Women's Under-21 Championship are shown below. The match winners are shown in bold.

**Last 32**; Best of 5 frames
**Wei Lintan (CHN)**	**3**
Thatsonnan Phonsang (THA)	1
Thanchanok Promtong (THA)	0
**Wang Ruotong (CHN)**	**3**
Yitong Wang (CHN)	0
**Pawarisa Praphassorn (THA)**	**3**
**Yang Jiao (CHN)**	**3**
Supita Dairueak (THA)	2

**Last 16**; Best of 5 frames
**Narucha Phoemphul (THA)**	**3**
Wei Lintan (CHN)	0
Pornpita Dairueak (THA)	0
**Phakwalan Kongkaew (THA)**	**3**
Mo Tian Tian (CHN)	0
**Panchaya Channoi (THA)**	**3**
Wang Ruotong (CHN)	0
**Li Bi Han (CHN)**	**3**
**Miina Tani (JAP)**	**3**
Yitong Wang (CHN)	0
Sudtida Yingheng (THA)	0
**Natcharin Sornprasert (THA)**	**3**
**Liu Wei Yi Lu (CHN)**	**3**
Natchariya Sornprasert (THA)	0
Yang Jiao (CHN)	0
**Liu Zi Ling (CHN)**	**3**

**Quarter-finals**; Best of 5 frames
Narucha Phoemphul (THA)	1
**Phakwalan Kongkaew (THA)**	**3**
**Panchaya Channoi (THA)**	**3**
Li Bi Han (CHN)	0
Miina Tani (JAP)	0
**Natcharin Sornprasert (THA)**	**3**
Liu Wei Yi Lu (CHN)	0
**Liu Zi Ling (CHN)**	**3**

**Semi-finals**; Best of 5 frames
Phakwalan Kongkaew (THA)	1
**Panchaya Channoi (THA)**	**3**
Natcharin Sornprasert (THA)	1
**Liu Zi Ling (CHN)**	**3**

**Final**; Best of 5 frames
**Panchaya Channoi (THA)**	**3**
Liu Zi Ling (CHN)	1

== Century breaks ==
Two century breaks were made during the main event, both in the group stages:

- 112 – Bai Yulu
- 107 – Amee Kamani
