= Bai Yulu =

Chinese snooker player (born 2003)

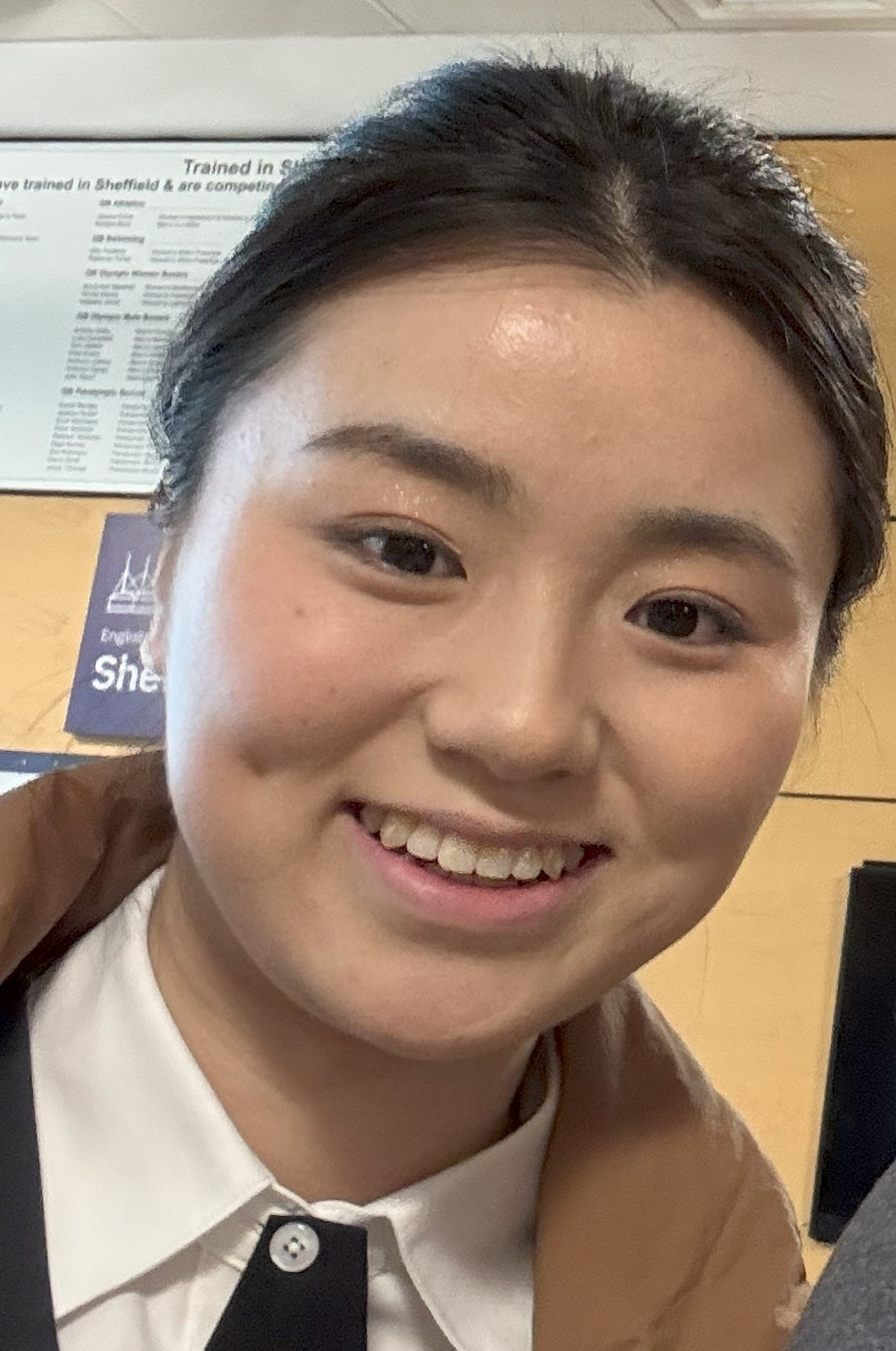
- Bai in 2025

Personal information
- Born: 10 July 2003 (age 23) Weinan, China

Sport
- Country: China
- Sport: Snooker
- Professional: 2024–present
- Highest ranking: World Snooker Tour: 88 (July 2025); World Women's Snooker: 1
- Current ranking: 124 (as of 7 November 2026)
- Best ranking finish: Last 48 (2024 UK Championship)
Medal record
Women's snooker
Representing China
World Games
Gold medal – first place	2025 Chengdu	Six-red singles

Bai Yulu (Chinese: 白雨露; born 10 July 2003) is a Chinese professional snooker player who competes both on the World Women's Snooker Tour and the main World Snooker Tour. She is a two-time World Women's Champion and a former women's world number one.

A former world junior champion, Bai made her debut on the World Women's Snooker tour at the 2023 World Women's Snooker Championship, where she finished runner-up to Baipat Siripaporn. She defeated Mink Nutcharut to win the 2024 final, becoming the first World Women's Champion from mainland China. She defeated Nutcharut again in the 2025 final to retain her title, becoming the seventh multiple World Women's Champion. She is also a two-time winner of the UK Women's Snooker Championship, having claimed the title in 2024 and 2025. She reached number one in the women's world rankings for the first time in January 2026, becoming the third Asian player to attain that position. She has won a total of eight ranking titles on the World Women's Snooker Tour.

As the reigning World Women's Champion, Bai received a two-year tour card to the main professional World Snooker Tour from the start of the 2024–25 snooker season. In the 2024 UK Championship qualifiers, she became the first female player to win three matches at a professional ranking event. At the 2025 International Championship, she made a 145 break, the highest ever recorded by a female player in professional competition.

== Early life ==
Bai Yulu was born in Weinan, Shaanxi. Her parents went to work in Dongguan, Guangdong when she was a child. Aged eight, she moved to Dongguan to live with her parents. Her father, Bai Shuangjian, bought her a small snooker table that she played on, and from 2013 she started having lessons, coached by Li Jianbing.

== Career ==
At 15, Bai won the 2018 Asian Women's Snooker Invitational Championship in Hong Kong, defeating Ng On-yee in the final. Bai won the women's 2019 IBSF World Under-21 Snooker Championship in Qingdao with a 4–0 victory over Mink Nutcharut in the final. She celebrated her 16th birthday during the tournament. She reached the quarter-finals of the 2019 IBSF Women's World Snooker Championship, making the three highest breaks of the event: 91, 81 and 78. Accompanied by her mother, as she was unable as a 16-year-old to travel alone, she competed in the 2019 Hong Kong World Women's Masters, where she lost 1–4 to Rebecca Kenna in the final.

In 2023, she made her World Women's Snooker Tour debut at the World Women's Snooker Championship in Bangkok, Thailand. She made a 127 break in her group match against Amee Kamani, the highest break in the tournament's history, surpassing Kelly Fisher's 125 at the 2003 event. She defeated 12-time champion Reanne Evans 5–3 in the semi-finals, but lost the final 3–6 to Baipat Siripaporn. She won her first women's ranking title at the British Women's Open, defeating Evans 4–3 in the final. She also captured the titles of Asian Women's Championship and IBSF World Women's Snooker Championship in the same year.

The 2024 World Women's Snooker Championship was the first edition of the tournament to be staged in China. After coming from 0–3 behind to defeat Evans 5–3 in the semi-finals, Bai secured her first women's world title with a 6–5 victory over Mink in the final. Her 122 break in the final was the highest of the tournament and the highest ever made in a women's world final. Winning the world women's title secured Bai a two-year tour card to the main professional World Snooker Tour from the start of the 2024–25 snooker season. She also won the concurrent 2024 World Women's Under-21 Snooker Championship, defeating Narucha Phoemphul 3–0 in the final.

Bai became the first woman since Kelly Fisher in 1999 to win back-to-back matches at a ranking event when she defeated Farakh Ajaib and then Jamie Jones in the qualifying rounds for the 2024 UK Championship. She then became the first female player to register three wins at a ranking event by beating Scott Donaldson in the next round in a match which went to a final frame decider. Bai lost in the fourth round to Jack Lisowski 6‍–‍1, falling just short of making the televised stages.

At the 2025 World Women's Snooker Championship, Bai won her second consecutive world title. She defeated Mink 6‍–‍4 in the final, and became the seventh woman to win multiple world titles. In August, Bai competed at the World Games in the women's six red event rather than entering the 2025 Saudi Arabia Snooker Masters. She won the event by defeating Narucha Phoemphul of Thailand 2–0 in the final.

In January 2026, she won the WSF Women's Championship held in Sofia to reach the number one spot in the world women's rankings for the first time in her career.

== Performance and rankings timeline ==
=== World Snooker Tour ===
Tournament	2023/ 24	2024/ 25	2025/ 26	2026/ 27
Ranking (Note: It shows the ranking at the beginning of the season)	(Note: She was an amateur)	(Note: New players on the Main Tour don't have a ranking)	88	(Note: Players qualified through Women's Tour started the season without ranking points)
Ranking tournaments
Championship League	A	WD	RR	RR
China Open	Not Held			LQ
Wuhan Open	LQ	LQ	LQ	LQ
British Open	A	LQ	1R	1R
English Open	A	LQ	LQ	LQ
Shenzhen Open (Note: The event was called the Xi'an Grand Prix (2024/2025–2025/2026))	NH	LQ	LQ	LQ
Northern Ireland Open	A	LQ	LQ	LQ
International Championship	LQ	LQ	LQ	LQ
UK Championship	A	LQ	LQ	LQ
Shoot Out	A	2R	2R	
Scottish Open	A	LQ	LQ	LQ
German Masters	A	LQ	LQ	LQ
Welsh Open	A	WD	LQ	
World Grand Prix	DNQ	DNQ	DNQ	
Players Championship	DNQ	DNQ	DNQ	
World Open	A	LQ	LQ	
Tour Championship	DNQ	DNQ	DNQ	
World Championship	LQ	LQ	LQ	
Non-ranking tournaments
Shanghai Masters	1R	A	A	A
Champion of Champions	A	1R	1R	A
Former ranking tournaments
Saudi Arabia Masters	NH	1R	A	NH

Performance Table Legend
LQ	lost in the qualifying draw	#R	lost in the early rounds of the tournament (WR = Wildcard round, RR = Round robin)	QF	lost in the quarter-finals
SF	lost in the semi-finals	F	lost in the final	W	won the tournament
DNQ	did not qualify for the tournament	A	did not participate in the tournament	WD	withdrew from the tournament

NH / Not Held	means an event was not held.
NR / Non-Ranking Event	means an event is/was no longer a ranking event.
R / Ranking Event	means an event is/was a ranking event.
MR / Minor-Ranking Event	means an event is/was a minor-ranking event.

=== World Women's Snooker Tour ===
Tournament	2022/ 23	2023/ 24	2024/ 25	2025/ 26	2026/ 27
Current tournaments
UK Championship	A	F	W	W	W
Australian Open	A	A	A	A	A
Niche Cues Open	Not Held			W	SF
Irish Open	Not Held			W	
WSF Women's Championship	Not Held		F	W	
Belgian Open	A	A	A	SF	
British Open	W	A	QF	F	
World Championship	F	W	W	QF	
Former tournaments
Albanian Open	NH	SF	Not Held		
Masters	A	A	SF	Not Held	
US Open	A	A	A	Not Held	

Performance Table Legend
LQ	lost in the qualifying draw	#R	lost in the early rounds of the tournament (WR = Wildcard round, RR = Round robin)	QF	lost in the quarter-finals
SF	lost in the semi-finals	F	lost in the final	W	won the tournament
DNQ	did not qualify for the tournament	A	did not participate in the tournament	WD	withdrew from the tournament

NH / Not Held	means an event was not held.
NR / Non-Ranking Event	means an event is/was no longer a ranking event.
R / Ranking Event	means an event is/was a ranking event.

== Career finals ==
=== World Women's Snooker Tour ===
Legend
Women's World Championship (2–1)
Women's UK Championship (3–1)
Others (4–2)

Outcome	No.	Year	Championship	Opponent in the final	Score	Ref.
Runner-up	1.	2023	Women's World Championship	Baipat Siripaporn (THA)	3–6	
Winner	1.	2023	Women's British Open	Reanne Evans (ENG)	4–3	
Runner-up	2.	2023	Women's UK Championship	Reanne Evans (ENG)	1–4	
Winner	2.	2024	Women's World Championship	Mink Nutcharut (THA)	6–5	
Winner	3.	2024	Women's UK Championship	Reanne Evans (ENG)	4–0	
Runner-up	3.	2025	WSF Women’s Championship	Mink Nutcharut (THA)	3–4	
Winner	4.	2025	Women's World Championship (2)	Mink Nutcharut (THA)	6–4	
Winner	5.	2025	Women's UK Championship (2)	Ng On-yee (HKG)	4–2	
Winner	6.	2025	Niche Cues Women’s Open	Ng On-yee (HKG)	5–1	
Winner	7.	2025	Irish Women’s Open	Mink Nutcharut (THA)	4–2	
Winner	8.	2026	WSF Women’s Championship	Ng On-yee (HKG)	4–0	
Runner-up	4.	2026	Women's British Open	Ng On-yee (HKG)	2–4	
Winner	9.	2026	Women's UK Championship (3)	Reanne Evans (ENG)	4–1	

=== Amateur Events ===
Outcome	No.	Year	Championship	Opponent in the final	Score	Ref.
Runner-up	1.	2018	IBSF World Under-21 Women's Championship	Mink Nutcharut (THA)	2–4	
Runner-up	2.	2019	ACBS Asian Women's Championship	Ng On-yee (HKG)	2–3	
Winner	1.	2019	IBSF World Under-21 Women's Championship	Mink Nutcharut (THA)	4–0	
Winner	2.	2023	ACBS Asian Women's Championship	Panchaya Channoi (THA)	3–0	
Winner	3.	2023	IBSF Women's World Championship	Ng On-yee (HKG)	4–0	
Winner	4.	2025	World Games Women's Six-red Snooker	Narucha Phoemphul (THA)	2–0	
