= 2024 Champion of Champions =

2024 Grosvenor Casinos Champion of Champions

Tournament information
- Dates: 11–17 November 2024
- Venue: Toughsheet Community Stadium
- City: Bolton
- Country: England
- Organisation: Matchroom Sport
- Format: Non-ranking event
- Total prize fund: £440,000
- Winner's share: £150,000
- Highest break: Mark Williams (WAL) (140)

Final
- Champion: Mark Williams (WAL)
- Runner-up: Xiao Guodong (CHN)
- Score: 10–6

The 2024 Champion of Champions (officially the 2024 Grosvenor Casinos Champion of Champions) was a professional snooker tournament that took place between 11 and 17 November 2024 at the Toughsheet Community Stadium in Bolton, England. It was the 14th edition of the Champion of Champions since the tournament was first staged in 1978. It featured 16 participants, primarily winners of significant tournaments since the previous year's event.

As an invitational tournament, it carried no world ranking points. It followed the 2024 International Championship and preceded the 2024 UK Championship. The winner received £150,000 from a total prize fund of £440,000.

Mark Allen was the defending champion, having defeated Judd Trump 10‍–‍3 in the previous final, but he failed to defend the title, losing 3‍–‍6 to Xiao Guodong in the semi‑finals.

Mark Williams won the tournament, beating Xiao 10‍–‍6 in the final. There were 25 century breaks made in the tournament, the highest break of the event was a 140 made by Williams in the group 3 final.

== Format ==
The 16 players were divided into four groups of four. The top four seeds were each assigned to a separate group with the next four seeds assigned in opposite order to those groups, so seed 1 with seed 8, seed 2 with seed 7 and so on. The bottom 8 seeds were randomly assigned to play one of the top seeds in the first match. Each day, one group played two best of seven frame matches, and the two winners played a best of 11 frame group final. The four group finalists played in the best of 11 frame semi‑finals, and the final was a best of 19 frame match played over two sessions.

The event was broadcast by ITV in the United Kingdom; by AMC in Hungary; by Fox Sports in Australia; by Mola in Indonesia; by Nova in the Czech Republic and Slovakia; by Sky in New Zealand; by StarHub in Singapore; by Sportklub in Croatia, Bosnia and Herzegovina, Montenegro, Serbia, Slovenia and North Macedonia; by VTM in Belgium; by Viaplay in Estonia, Latvia, Lithuana, Iceland, the Netherlands and Poland; by Viasat in Denmark, Sweden and Norway; and by Matchroom Sport in all other territories.

=== Prize fund ===
The breakdown of prize money for this event is shown below:

- Winner: £150,000
- Runner-up: £60,000
- Semi-final: £30,000
- Group runner-up: £17,500
- Group semi-final: £12,500
- Total: £440,000

== Qualification ==
Players qualified for the event by winning events throughout the previous year. Events shown below in grey are for players who had already qualified for the event.

Qualification table
Tournament	Date of tournament final	Winner
2023 Champion of Champions	19 November 2023	Mark Allen (NIR)
2023 UK Championship	3 December 2023	Ronnie O'Sullivan (ENG)
2024 Masters	14 January 2024	Ronnie O'Sullivan (ENG)
2024 World Championship	6 May 2024	Kyren Wilson (ENG)
2024 World Grand Prix	21 January 2024	Ronnie O'Sullivan (ENG)
2024 German Masters	4 February 2024	Judd Trump (ENG)
2024 Players Championship	25 February 2024	Mark Allen (NIR)
2024 Championship League (invitational)	13 March 2024	Mark Selby (ENG)
2024 Tour Championship	7 April 2024	Mark Williams (WAL)
2024 Championship League (ranking)	3 July 2024	Ali Carter (ENG)
2024 Wuhan Open	12 October 2024	Xiao Guodong (CHN)
2024 International Championship	10 November 2024	Ding Junhui (CHN)
2023 Scottish Open	17 December 2023	Gary Wilson (ENG)
2024 English Open	22 September 2024	Neil Robertson (AUS)
2024 Welsh Open	18 February 2024	Gary Wilson (ENG)
2024 Northern Ireland Open	27 October 2024	Kyren Wilson (ENG)
2024 British Open	29 September 2024	Mark Selby (ENG)
2024 World Women's Championship	17 March 2024	Bai Yulu (CHN)
2024 World Championship (runner-up)	6 May 2024	Jak Jones (WAL)
2024 Shanghai Masters	21 July 2024	Judd Trump (ENG)
2024 World Seniors Championship	12 May 2024	Igor Figueiredo (BRA)
2023 Shoot Out (Note: This is the second time the Shoot Out tournament was played in calendar year 2023, with the January 2023 edition falling within the 2022‍–‍23 season.)	9 December 2023	Mark Allen (NIR)
World Ranking Top-Up	N/A	Luca Brecel (BEL) (Note: Luca Brecel won a non-ranking tournament in the previous season, but it was not considered to be an automatic qualifying event for this edition, and was invited as an official "top‑up" on world rankings.)
World Ranking Top-Up	N/A	Shaun Murphy (ENG)

Player also qualified by winning another tournament

Note: Qualification table is based on previous edition as well as confirmed players. No official qualification table is available and possible qualification by a unique winner of either the invitational World Masters of Snooker or the ranking Saudi Arabia Snooker Masters is unclear.

== Summary ==
=== Group stage ===
==== Group 1 ====
Group 1 was played on 11 November.

In the group semi‑finals, defending champion Mark Allen defeated reigning World Seniors Champion Igor Figueiredo 4‍–‍2, making breaks of 102 and 107, while World Championship runner‑up Jak Jones defeated reigning Scottish Open and Welsh Open champion Gary Wilson by the same scoreline of 4‍–‍2, making breaks of 106 and 132.

In the group final, Jones won the first three frames, making a break of 137 in the process, to leave Allen 0‍–‍3 behind. Allen recovered after that, winning five frames in a row to lead 5‍–‍3, and eventually defeated Jones 6‍–‍4, with Allen achieving a high break of 104. After the match, Allen commented: "The start wasn't good from me, I was all at sea. After that I didn't miss too much. I felt like I upped the tempo and played some good stuff even though I could have lost a couple of frames. It could have gone four all but it went 5‍–‍3 so after that all you have to do is hold yourself together then." He added: "I love this event, it has always been one of my favourites on the calendar and I want to defend the title."

==== Group 3 ====
Group 3 was played on 12 November.

In the group semi‑finals, Mark Williams beat reigning World Women's Champion Bai Yulu 4‍–‍1 in what was Williams' first win ever in the Champion of Champions. Reigning World Champion Kyren Wilson defeated 2023 World Champion Luca Brecel, who was invited as a top‑up from the rankings, by the same 4‍–‍1 scoreline.

In the group final, Wilson and Williams shared the first four frames to be tied 2‍–‍2 at the mid‑session interval. After resumption of play, Williams moved up to 5‍–‍3 to be one frame away from victory, making a 140 break in the seventh frame, before Wilson regained parity at 5‍–‍5, making a 123 break in the ninth frame, to force a deciding frame which Williams eventually won to defeat Wilson 6‍–‍5. This was Williams' first ever win against Wilson, having lost all seven of their previous encounters. After the match, Williams commented: "I can’t really be hitting it much better when I’m practising. It doesn’t come out so much on the match table, but a bit of it came out there. I played well there and beat him 6‍–‍5. He’s one of the best players. [...] I’m pushing these top players close. I don’t know how I am, but lets see how long it can continue."

==== Group 2 ====
Group 2 was played on 13 November.

In the group semi‑finals, world number one Judd Trump whitewashed Ding Junhui, who had won the International Championship the previous week, while reigning English Open champion Neil Robertson defeated Ali Carter 4‍–‍3.

In the group final, Robertson led Trump 3‍–‍1 at the mid‑session interval before Trump regained parity at 3‍–‍3. Robertson then went 5‍–‍3 ahead, winning a protracted eighth frame, that lasted almost an hour, on the final pink. Trump then claimed the ninth frame to come back to 4‍–‍5 but Robertson won a tense tenth frame to defeat Trump 6‍–‍4 for his first win against the Englishman since the 2020 UK Championship final. After the match, Robertson said: "It was an incredible game. Judd showed all of the qualities he’s had throughout his whole career. His safety play and discipline was incredible. I matched it with him and stayed with him."

==== Group 4 ====
Group 4 was played on 14 November.

In the group semi‑finals, Wuhan Open champion Xiao Guodong came back from 0‍–‍3 behind against reigning UK and Masters champion Ronnie O'Sullivan, making three breaks of over 50, including a 130 in frame 4, to force a close decider which he eventually won to defeat O'Sullivan 4‍–‍3. Mark Selby defeated Shaun Murphy, who was invited as a top‑up from the rankings, 4‍–‍2.

In the group final, Selby led Xiao 4‍–‍1 after five frames, making a break of 120 in the third, before Xiao won three consecutive frames without Selby scoring a point to even out the scoreline at 4‍–‍4. Regaining the lead, Selby won the ninth frame to go 5‍–‍4 ahead but Xiao took the tenth after a long safety exchange on the colours to again level the scores at 5‍–‍5. After both players had had scoring opportunities in a close deciding frame that included a rerack, Xiao fluked the final yellow and cleared to the pink to defeat Selby 6‍–‍5. After the match, Xiao commented: "I didn't think I could win. In the last frame I was a lucky boy and I feel sorry for Mark. There was pressure because the game was close, but I enjoyed it, I was relaxed. Winning in Wuhan has helped me a lot. [...] I have changed my mindset now and I'm enjoying it."

=== Semi finals ===
The first semi‑final between defending champion Mark Allen and Wuhan Open champion Xiao Guodong was played on 15 November as the best of 11 frames.

Xiao made breaks of 83 and 71 to lead Allen 3‍–‍1 at the mid‑session interval. After the interval, Allen took the next two frames to restore equality at 3‍–‍3, but Xiao won the following two frames to regain his two‑frame advantage at 5‍–‍3. The ninth frame came down to the colours. Xiao managed to develop the pink from his shot on the blue and cleared up to the final black for a 6‍–‍3 victory over the defending champion. With this win, he became the first Chinese player to reach the final of the Champion of Champions. After the match, Xiao said: "I will just enjoy watching tomorrow's game now. I don't care if I play Mark [Williams] or Neil [Robertson]. They are both legendary players. I will just enjoy it. That's it."

The second semi‑final was played on 16 November as the best of 11 frames. Mark Williams faced Neil Robertson.

After winning the first two frames to lead Robertson 2‍–‍0, Williams escaped from a snooker in the third frame on the last red on his second hit‑and‑hope attempt, fluking the red and then clearing the table to lead 3‍–‍0. After winning the fourth frame as well, Williams led Robertson 4‍–‍0 at the mid‑session interval. Williams went on to win the match 6‍–‍2, making a 132 break in the 6th frame. After the match Williams commented: "I'm really pleased, I am hitting the ball very well. My safety was good, I created chances and potted a couple of crazy balls. Perhaps I should give myself more credit because I am taking it to these youngsters and I'm in another big final. My all‑round game is better than ever and that's why I am still competing with the top players. I came here with no expectations so there is no pressure on me tomorrow."

=== Final ===
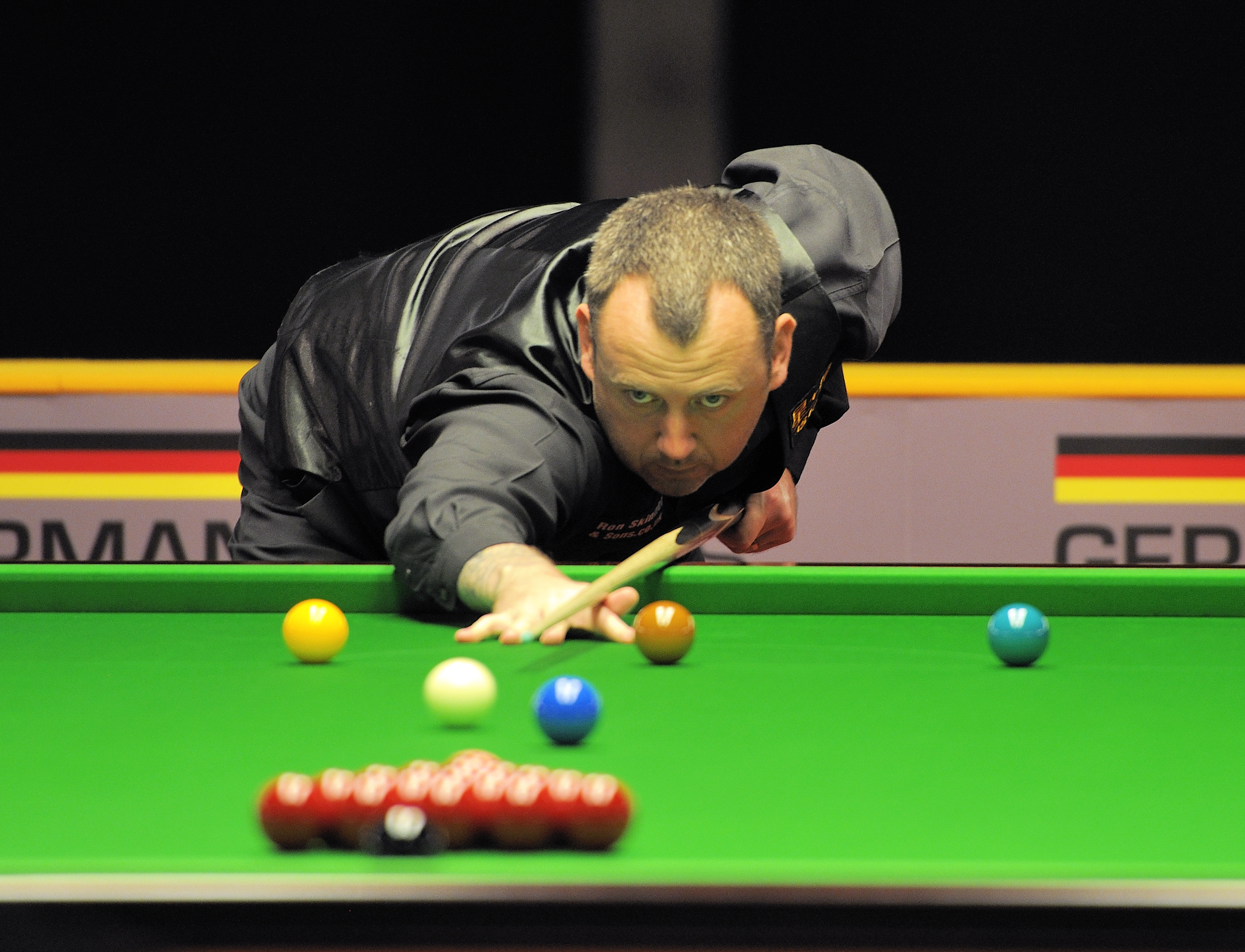
Mark Williams (pictured in 2014) won his first Champion of Champions title, beating Xiao Guodong 10‍–‍6

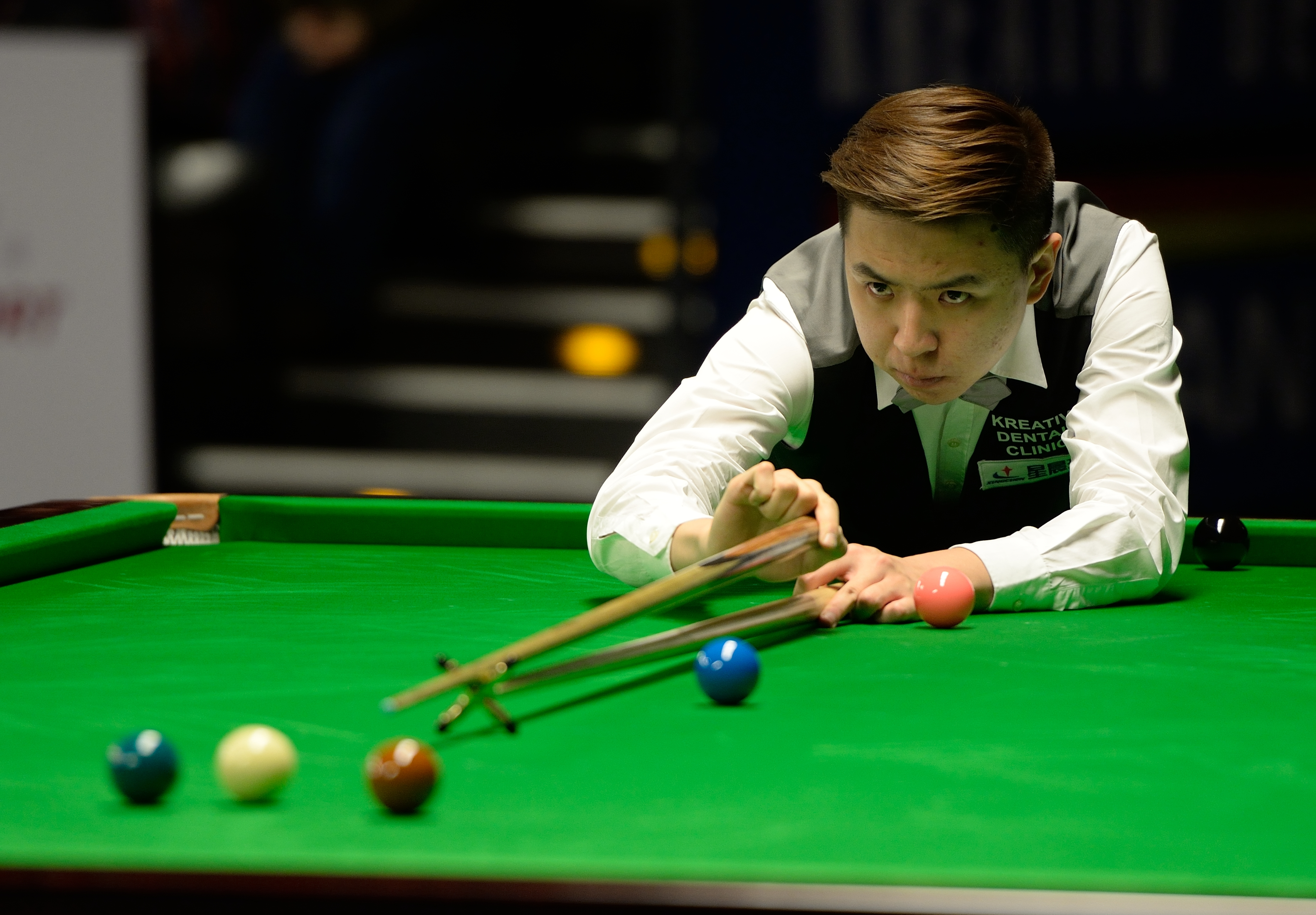
Xiao Guodong (pictured in 2015) beat Ronnie O'Sullivan, Mark Selby, and Mark Allen to reach the final

The final was played on 17 November as the best of 19 frames, played over two sessions.

In the afternoon session, Williams took the first five frames, but Xiao responded to win the next four, making two century breaks. The score was 5‍–‍4 to Williams going into the evening session. In the evening session, Williams went on to win 10‍–‍6, securing his first Champion of Champions title. After the match, Williams commented: "I can't believe it, I'm stood here just about to pick that trophy up and I don't know how I'm doing it really, but I'm sticking in there. The interval came at the perfect time for me because if it [had] carried on, he [Xiao] was probably going to run away with it. I'm lost for words really. I'm over the moon." Xiao said: "The crowd was very nice and I'd also like to thank the Chinese fans who watched me play during the night time. I played a legend today and I learned a lot. I want Ronnie [O'Sullivan], Mark [Williams] and John [Higgins] to play for another ten or twenty years!"

== Tournament draw ==
The draw for the tournament is shown below. Numbers in parentheses after the players' names denote the top eight seeded players, and players in bold denote match winners.

**Group semi-finals** **(last 16)**; Best of 7 frames
**Mark Allen (NIR) (1)**	**4**
Igor Figueiredo (BRA)	2
**Group 1**
Gary Wilson (ENG) (8)	2
**Jak Jones (WAL)**	**4**
Ronnie O'Sullivan (ENG) (5)	3
**Xiao Guodong (CHN)**	**4**
**Group 4**
**Mark Selby (ENG) (4)**	**4**
Shaun Murphy (ENG)	2
**Kyren Wilson (ENG) (3)**	**4**
Luca Brecel (BEL)	1
**Group 3**
**Mark Williams (WAL) (6)**	**4**
Bai Yulu (CHN)	1
Ali Carter (ENG) (7)	3
**Neil Robertson (AUS)**	**4**
**Group 2**
**Judd Trump (ENG) (2)**	**4**
Ding Junhui (CHN)	0

**Group finals** **(quarter-finals)**; Best of 11 frames
**Mark Allen (NIR) (1)**	**6**
Jak Jones (WAL)	4
**Xiao Guodong (CHN)**	**6**
Mark Selby (ENG) (4)	5
Kyren Wilson (ENG) (3)	5
**Mark Williams (WAL) (6)**	**6**
**Neil Robertson (AUS)**	**6**
Judd Trump (ENG) (2)	4

**Semi-finals**; Best of 11 frames
Mark Allen (NIR) (1)	3
**Xiao Guodong (CHN)**	**6**
**Mark Williams (WAL) (6)**	**6**
Neil Robertson (AUS)	2

**Final**; Best of 19 frames
Xiao Guodong (CHN)	6
**Mark Williams (WAL) (6)**	**10**

=== Final ===
Final: Best of 19 frames. Referee: Marcel Eckardt; Toughsheet Community Stadium, Bolton, England, 17 November 2024
Xiao Guodong; China	6–**10**	**Mark Williams** (6); Wales
Afternoon: 25–**73**, 58–**79**, 0–**91**, 0–**77**, 11–**65**, **68**–55, **101**–2 (101), **76**–1, **110**–8 (110); Evening: 4–**112** (104), 34–**71**, **76**–0, 12–**125**, **75**–37, 1–**95**, 1–**78**
(frame 9) **110**	Highest break	104 (frame 10)
**2**	Century breaks	1

== Century breaks ==
A total of 25 century breaks were made during the tournament.

- 140, 132, 109, 104 – Mark Williams
- 137, 132, 106, 104 – Jak Jones
- 132, 123, 115, 105 – Kyren Wilson
- 132, 120 – Mark Selby
- 130, 118, 110, 101 – Xiao Guodong
- 127 – Judd Trump
- 125 – Ronnie O'Sullivan
- 120 – Gary Wilson
- 110 – Neil Robertson
- 107, 104, 102 – Mark Allen
