= 2024 World Women's Snooker Championship =

Women's snooker tournament, held in March 2024

Tournament information
- Dates: 11–17 March 2024
- Venue: Changping Gymnasium
- City: Dongguan
- Country: China
- Organisation: World Women's Snooker; CBSA
- Total prize fund: £33,400
- Winner's share: £10,000
- Highest break: Bai Yulu (CHN) (122)

Final
- Champion: Bai Yulu (CHN)
- Runner-up: Mink Nutcharut (THA)
- Score: 6–5

The 2024 World Women's Snooker Championship was a women's snooker tournament that took place from 11 to 17 March 2024 at the Changping Gymnasium in Dongguan, China. Organised by World Women's Snooker and the Chinese Billiards and Snooker Association (CBSA), the tournament was the 41st edition of the World Women's Snooker Championship and the first to be staged in China. The winner received £10,000 from a total prize pool of £33,400, as well as a two-year tour card to the main professional World Snooker Tour from the start of the 2024–25 snooker season.

A total of 45 players participated in the tournament's round-robin group stage,16 of whom qualified for the knockout stage. Baipat Siripaporn was the defending champion, having defeated Bai Yulu 6‍–‍3 in the 2023 final, but she lost 0–4 to Reanne Evans in the last 16. After coming from 0–3 behind to defeat Evans 5–3 in the semi-finals, Bai defeated Mink Nutcharut 6–5 in the final, winning the deciding frame on the last pink ball to secure her first women's world title. It was Bai's second ranking title from her five ranking event appearances on the women's tour. She became the fourth Asian player to win the women's world title—following Hong Kong's Ng On-yee and Thailand's Mink and Baipat—and the first winner from mainland China. The event produced six century breaks, of which Bai's 122 break in the final was the highest of the tournament and the highest ever made in a women's world final.

The World Women's Under-21 Championship and World Women's Seniors Championship were staged concurrently with the main tournament. Bai also won the Under-21 title, defeating Narucha Phoemphul 3–0 in the final. Tessa Davidson won her second Seniors world title, beating Han Fang 3–1 in the final.

== Background ==
The Women's Professional Snooker Championship was held ten times between 1934 and 1950, with no tournaments staged between 1941 and 1947. Ruth Harrison won eight of those ten events. The Women's World Open, first held in 1976, is recognised as the beginning of the modern World Women's Snooker Championship. English player Reanne Evans holds the record for the most wins, having won 12 titles, including ten consecutive victories from 2005 to 2014.

== Format ==
A total of 45 players participated in the tournament's round-robin group stage,16 of whom qualified for the knockout stage. The group stage consisted of nine groups of five players, with two seeded players in each group. The nine group winners advanced to the knockout stage. The nine group runners-up and the best five third-placed players played a preliminary round for the seven remaining places. The 16 players were placed in the draw based on their performance in the group stage.

All group stage and preliminary round matches were played as the best of five frames. The last-16 and quarter-final matches were played as the best of seven, semi-finals as the best of nine, and the final as the best of 11 frames.

The tournament was streamed in China on Huya, TikTok, and WeChat. International coverage was available via the World Women's Snooker Facebook page and the World Professional Billiards and Snooker Association's YouTube channel. The audience peak in China was 300,000 via a streaming platform, and the cumulative viewing figure for the country was 175.4 million. Over six million people accessed coverage via Douyin. There were 700,000 views via YouTube, including 200,000 for the final.

== Prize fund ==
The breakdown of prize money for the event is shown below:

- Winner: £10,000
- Runner-up: £5,000
- Semi-final: £2,500
- Quarter-final: £1,500
- Last 16: £800
- Highest break: £1,000
- Total: £33,400

== Group stage ==
The results for the group stage of the tournament is shown below. All matches were played as the best of five frames. The nine group winners advanced to the knockout stage. The nine group runners-up and the best five third-placed players contested a preliminary round for the seven remaining places. The 16 players were placed in the draw based on their performance in the group stage.

In the tables below, L16 = Qualified to last 16 of knockout stage; Prelim. = Qualified to preliminary round of knockout stage; Elim. = Eliminated from tournament.

=== Group A ===
Pos	Player	Pld	W	L	FF	FA	FD	
1	Han Fang (CHN)	4	4	0	12	3	+9	L16
2	Baipat Siripaporn (THA)	4	3	1	10	3	+7	Prelim.
3	Miina Tani (JPN)	4	2	2	8	7	+1	Prelim.
4	Shiu Wing Man (HKG)	4	1	3	4	9	−5	Elim.
5	Zolboo Unurbayar (MNG)	4	0	4	0	12	−12	Elim.

Source: Group A results from WPBSA SnookerScores and snooker.org

Baipat Siripaporn	3‍–‍0	Zolboo Unurbayar
Miina Tani	2‍–‍3	Han Fang
Baipat Siripaporn	1‍–‍3	Han Fang
Zolboo Unurbayar	0‍–‍3	Shiu Wing Man
Baipat Siripaporn	3‍–‍0	Shiu Wing Man
Zolboo Unurbayar	0‍–‍3	Miina Tani
Shiu Wing Man	1‍–‍3	Miina Tani
Zolboo Unurbayar	0‍–‍3	Han Fang
Baipat Siripaporn	3‍–‍0	Miina Tani
Shiu Wing Man	0‍–‍3	Han Fang

=== Group B ===
Pos	Player	Pld	W	L	FF	FA	FD	
1	Cheung Yee Ting (HKG)	4	3	1	11	9	+2	L16
2	Rebecca Kenna (ENG)	4	3	1	11	8	+3	Prelim.
3	Narantuya Bayarsaikhan (MNG)	4	2	2	10	8	+2	Prelim.
4	Xia Yuying (CHN)	4	2	2	10	8	+2	Elim.
5	Li Bihan (CHN)	4	0	4	3	12	−9	Elim.

Source: Group B results from WPBSA SnookerScores and snooker.org

Rebecca Kenna	3‍–‍2	Xia Yuying
Cheung Yee Ting	3‍–‍2	N. Bayarsaikhan
Rebecca Kenna	2‍–‍3	Cheung Yee Ting
Li Bihan	0‍–‍3	Xia Yuying
Rebecca Kenna	3‍–‍1	Li Bihan
Xia Yuying	2‍–‍3	N. Bayarsaikhan
Li Bihan	0‍–‍3	N. Bayarsaikhan
Xia Yuying	3‍–‍2	Cheung Yee Ting
Rebecca Kenna	3‍–‍2	N. Bayarsaikhan
Li Bihan	2‍–‍3	Cheung Yee Ting

=== Group C ===
Pos	Player	Pld	W	L	FF	FA	FD	
1	Bai Yulu (CHN)	4	4	0	12	0	+12	L16
2	Chu Pui Ying (HKG)	4	3	1	9	3	+6	Prelim.
3	Chan Wai Lam (HKG)	4	1	3	4	9	−5	Elim.
4	Diana Schuler (GER)	4	1	3	3	9	−6	Elim.
5	Urantuul Tsolmon (MNG)	4	1	3	3	10	−7	Elim.

Source: Group C results from WPBSA SnookerScores and snooker.org

Urantuul Tsolmon	0‍–‍3	Bai Yulu
Diana Schuler	0‍–‍3	Chan Wai Lam
Bai Yulu	3‍–‍0	Chan Wai Lam
Urantuul Tsolmon	0‍–‍3	Chu Pui Ying
Bai Yulu	3‍–‍0	Chu Pui Ying
Urantuul Tsolmon	0‍–‍3	Diana Schuler
Diana Schuler	0‍–‍3	Chu Pui Ying
Urantuul Tsolmon	3‍–‍1	Chan Wai Lam
Diana Schuler	0‍–‍3	Bai Yulu
Chu Pui Ying	3‍–‍0	Chan Wai Lam

=== Group D ===
Pos	Player	Pld	W	L	FF	FA	FD	
1	Reanne Evans (ENG)	4	4	0	12	3	+9	L16
2	Deng Xinshun (CHN)	4	3	1	10	5	+5	Prelim.
3	Narucha Phoemphul (THA)	4	2	2	6	7	−1	Elim.
4	So Man Yan (HKG)	4	1	3	8	9	−1	Elim.
5	Erdenetugs Dash (MNG)	4	0	4	0	12	−12	Elim.

Source: Group D results from WPBSA SnookerScores and snooker.org

Deng Xinshun	1‍–‍3	Reanne Evans
Narucha Phoemphul	3‍–‍1	So Man Yan
Narucha Phoemphul	0‍–‍3	Reanne Evans
Deng Xinshun	3‍–‍0	Erdenetugs Dash
Reanne Evans	3‍–‍0	Erdenetugs Dash
Deng Xinshun	3‍–‍2	So Man Yan
So Man Yan	3‍–‍0	Erdenetugs Dash
Narucha Phoemphul	0‍–‍3	Deng Xinshun
So Man Yan	2‍–‍3	Reanne Evans
Erdenetugs Dash	0‍–‍3	Narucha Phoemphul

=== Group E ===
Pos	Player	Pld	W	L	FF	FA	FD	
1	Ng On-yee (HKG)	4	4	0	9	0	+9	L16
2	Byambasuren Sergelenbaatar (MNG)	4	3	1	6	4	+2	Prelim.
3	Bai Yaru (CHN)	4	2	2	3	8	−5	Elim.
4	Lynn Shi (CHN)	4	1	3	3	9	−6	Elim.
5	Natasha Chethan (IND)	4	0	4	0	0	0	Elim.

Source: Group E results from WPBSA SnookerScores and snooker.org

Note: w/o=walkover; w/d=withdrawn

Ng On-yee	3‍–‍0	Lynn Shi
Natasha Chethan	‍w/d‍–‍w/o	Bai Yaru
Ng On-yee	3‍–‍0	Bai Yaru
Lynn Shi	1‍–‍3	B. Sergelenbaatar
Ng On-yee	3‍–‍0	B. Sergelenbaatar
Lynn Shi	w/o‍–‍‍w/d	Natasha Chethan
B. Sergelenbaatar	w/o‍–‍‍w/d	Natasha Chethan
Bai Yaru	3‍–‍2	Lynn Shi
Ng On-yee	w/o‍–‍‍w/d	Natasha Chethan
B. Sergelenbaatar	3‍–‍0	Bai Yaru

=== Group F ===
Pos	Player	Pld	W	L	FF	FA	FD	
1	Mink Nutcharut (THA)	4	4	0	12	0	+12	L16
2	Fong Mei Mei (HKG)	4	3	1	9	5	+4	Prelim.
3	Jaique Ip (HKG)	4	2	2	8	6	+2	Prelim.
4	Liu Weiyilu (CHN)	4	1	3	3	11	−8	Elim.
5	Jambaa Sosorbaram (MNG)	4	0	4	2	12	−10	Elim.

Source: Group F results from WPBSA SnookerScores and snooker.org

Mink Nutcharut	3‍–‍0	Fong Mei Mei
Jaique Ip	3‍–‍0	Jambaa Sosorbaram
Mink Nutcharut	3‍–‍0	Jambaa Sosorbaram
Fong Mei Mei	3‍–‍0	Liu Weiyilu
Mink Nutcharut	3‍–‍0	Liu Weiyilu
Fong Mei Mei	3‍–‍2	Jaique Ip
Liu Weiyilu	0‍–‍3	Jaique Ip
Jambaa Sosorbaram	0‍–‍3	Fong Mei Mei
Mink Nutcharut	3‍–‍0	Jaique Ip
Liu Weiyilu	3‍–‍2	Jambaa Sosorbaram

=== Group G ===
Pos	Player	Pld	W	L	FF	FA	FD	
1	Tessa Davidson (ENG)	4	4	0	12	2	+10	L16
2	Yang Meng (CHN)	4	3	1	9	5	+4	Prelim.
3	Ho Yee Ki (HKG)	4	2	2	9	6	+3	Prelim.
4	Mohitha R. T. (IND)	4	1	3	3	10	−7	Elim.
5	Otgonbayar Jigden (MNG)	4	0	4	2	12	−10	Elim.

Source: Group G results from WPBSA SnookerScores and snooker.org

Tessa Davidson	3‍–‍0	Otgonbayar Jigden
Ho Yee Ki	3‍–‍0	Mohitha R. T.
Tessa Davidson	3‍–‍0	Mohitha R. T.
Otgonbayar Jigden	1‍–‍3	Yang Meng
Tessa Davidson	3‍–‍0	Yang Meng
Otgonbayar Jigden	0‍–‍3	Ho Yee Ki
Yang Meng	3‍–‍1	Ho Yee Ki
Mohitha R. T.	3‍–‍1	Otgonbayar Jigden
Tessa Davidson	3‍–‍2	Ho Yee Ki
Yang Meng	3‍–‍0	Mohitha R. T.

=== Group H ===
Pos	Player	Pld	W	L	FF	FA	FD	
1	Katrina Wan (HKG)	4	3	1	9	6	+3	L16
2	Amee Kamani (IND)	4	3	1	10	5	+5	Prelim.
3	Liu Ziling (CHN)	4	2	2	10	8	+2	Elim.
4	He Danni (CHN)	4	2	2	6	10	−4	Elim.
5	Emma Parker (ENG)	4	0	4	6	12	−6	Elim.

Source: Group H results from WPBSA SnookerScores and snooker.org

Emma Parker	2‍–‍3	Liu Ziling
Amee Kamani	3‍–‍0	He Danni
Emma Parker	2‍–‍3	He Danni
Liu Ziling	3‍–‍0	Katrina Wan
Emma Parker	2‍–‍3	Katrina Wan
Liu Ziling	2‍–‍3	Amee Kamani
Katrina Wan	3‍–‍1	Amee Kamani
He Danni	3‍–‍2	Liu Ziling
Emma Parker	0‍–‍3	Amee Kamani
He Danni	0‍–‍3	Katrina Wan

=== Group I ===
Pos	Player	Pld	W	L	FF	FA	FD	
1	Anupama Ramachandran (IND)	4	4	0	12	3	+9	L16
2	Mary Talbot-Deegan (ENG)	4	3	1	10	4	+6	Prelim.
3	Mo Tiantian (CHN)	4	2	2	7	7	0	Prelim.
4	Lau Yuk Fan (HKG)	4	1	3	5	9	−4	Elim.
5	Altangerel Bolortuya (MNG)	4	0	4	1	12	−11	Elim.

Source: Group I results from WPBSA SnookerScores and snooker.org

Mary Talbot-Deegan	3‍–‍1	Mo Tiantian
A. Ramachandran	3‍–‍0	Altangerel Bolortuya
Mary Talbot-Deegan	3‍–‍0	Altangerel Bolortuya
Mo Tiantian	3‍–‍0	Lau Yuk Fan
Lau Yuk Fan	0‍–‍3	Mary Talbot-Deegan
Mo Tiantian	0‍–‍3	A. Ramachandran
Lau Yuk Fan	2‍–‍3	A. Ramachandran
Altangerel Bolortuya	1‍–‍3	Mo Tiantian
Mary Talbot-Deegan	1‍–‍3	A. Ramachandran
Lau Yuk Fan	3‍–‍0	Altangerel Bolortuya

== Knockout stage ==
The results for the knockout stage of the tournament are shown below. Numbers in parentheses after the players' names denote their seeding based on group stage performance, and players in bold denote match winners. The last-16 and quarter-final matches were played as the best of seven, semi-finals as the best of nine, and the final as the best of 11 frames.

**Preliminary round** Best of 5 frames
**Fong Mei Mei (HKG) (21)**	**3**
B. Sergelenbaatar (MNG) (26)	2
**Baipat Siripaporn (THA) (1)**	**3**
Mo Tiantian (CHN)	0
**Mary Talbot-Deegan (ENG) (6)**	**3**
Jaique Ip (HKG) (17)	0
**Deng Xinshun (CHN)**	**3**
Ho Yee Ki (HKG) (11)	1
Amee Kamani (IND) (12)	2
**N. Bayarsaikhan (MNG) (14)**	**3**
**Miina Tani (JPN) (18)**	**3**
Chu Pui Ying (HKG) (22)	0
**Rebecca Kenna (ENG) (5)**	**3**
Yang Meng (CHN)	0

**Last 16**; Best of 7 frames
**Bai Yulu (CHN) (9)**	**4**
Fong Mei Mei (HKG) (21)	0
Cheung Yee Ting (HKG) (19)	2
**Katrina Wan (HKG) (27)**	**4**
**Reanne Evans (ENG) (4)**	**4**
Baipat Siripaporn (THA) (1)	0
**Mary Talbot-Deegan (ENG) (6)**	**4**
Tessa Davidson (ENG) (8)	3
**Ng On-yee (HKG) (3)**	**4**
Deng Xinshun (CHN)	0
N. Bayarsaikhan (MNG)	0
**A. Ramachandran (IND) (13)**	**4**
**Han Fang (CHN) (14)**	**4**
Miina Tani (JPN) (18)	2
Rebecca Kenna (ENG) (5)	0
**Mink Nutcharut (THA) (2)**	**4**

**Quarter-finals**; Best of 7 frames
**Bai Yulu (CHN) (9)**	**4**
Katrina Wan (HKG) (27)	2
**Reanne Evans (ENG) (4)**	**4**
Mary Talbot-Deegan (ENG) (6)	0
**Ng On-yee (HKG) (3)**	**4**
A. Ramachandran (IND) (13)	1
Han Fang (CHN)	0
**Mink Nutcharut (THA) (2)**	**4**

**Semi-finals**; Best of 9 frames
**Bai Yulu (CHN) (9)**	**5**
Reanne Evans (ENG) (4)	3
Ng On-yee (HKG) (3)	0
**Mink Nutcharut (THA) (2)**	**5**

**Final**; Best of 11 frames
**Bai Yulu (CHN) (9)**	**6**
Mink Nutcharut (THA) (2)	5

=== Final ===
Final
Final: Best of 11 frames. Referee: Wang Bokai; Changping Gymnasium, Dongguan, China, 17 March 2024
**Bai Yulu** (9); China	**6**–5	Mink Nutcharut (2); Thailand
Frame scores: **50**‍–‍41, 64‍–‍**69**, **126**‍–‍7 (122), **60**‍–‍20; 7‍–‍**55**, 6‍–‍**77**, 31‍–‍**86** (62), **97**‍–‍6 (97), **119**‍–‍9 (75), 39‍–‍**61**, **58**‍–‍46
(frame 3) **122**	Highest break	62 (frame 7)
**1**	Century breaks	0

== Century breaks ==
A total of six century breaks were made in the tournament.

- 122, 113, 104 – Bai Yulu
- 106 – Mink Nutcharut
- 103, 101 – Reanne Evans
