= Narantuya Bayarsaikhan =

Mongolian snooker player

Personal information
- Native name: Баярсайханы Нарантуяа
- Nationality: Mongolian
- Born: 14 August 1994 (age 32)

Sport
- Sport: Snooker, pool, Heyball

Narantuya Bayarsaikhan (Mongolian: Баярсайханы Нарантуяа; born 14 August 1994) is a Mongolian snooker and pool player. She won the women's Asian Snooker Championship in 2025 and 2026, having won bronze in 2022. A thirteen-time Mongolian women's snooker champion, she reached a career-high World Women's Snooker (WWS) ranking of 11 in November 2025.

Narantuya has reached the quarter-finals of both the IBSF World Women's Snooker Championship and the World Women's Snooker Championship. On the WWS Tour, she reached the semi-finals of the 2024 Australian Women's Open, the 2026 Women's Snooker Open, and the Mongolia Women's Snooker World Cup in 2024.

== Early life ==
Narantuya Bayarsaikhan was born on 14 August 1994. She grew up in Ulaanbaatar and began playing cue sports at the age of 12. She became interested in playing after watching her father play. In 2006, she entered a pool tournament for the first time and finished second.

== Playing career ==
=== National and international competitions 2022 to 2024 ===
Having played pool, Narantuya later switched to snooker and had won ten national cue-sports titles by March 2022. She made her International Billiards and Snooker Federation (IBSF) Women's World Snooker Championship debut in Doha in March 2022, at the tournament designated the 2021 championship, and finished second in her group with victories over Diana Stateczny and Najla Alnaimi. She defeated Hong Kong's Ho Yee Ki 3–1 in the last 16 before losing 0–3 to Thailand's Waratthanun Sukritthanes in the quarter-finals.

Narantuya first participated in the Asian Women's Snooker Championship at the 2022 edition in Doha. She won both her group matches, defeating both Varsha Sanjeev and Melika Najafi 2–0. After receiving a bye in the last 16, she defeated Anupama Ramachandran 3–2 in the quarter-finals. She won a bronze medal after losing 0–3 to Mink Nutcharut in the semi-finals.

On her World Women's Snooker Tour debut at the 2023 World Women's Snooker Championship, she defeated three-time WWS world champion Ng On-yee 4–2 in the last 16 after losing the opening two frames. She lost in the quarter-finals to eventual champion Baipat Siripaporn.

In 2024, Narantuya reached the quarter-finals of the WWS Belgian and US women's opens before making her first WWS tour semi-final appearance at the Australian Women's Open. At the Australian tournament, she defeated Yee Ting Cheung 3–2 in the quarter-finals before losing 3–4 to Nutcharut in the semi-finals. She also won the Challenge Cup competition at the Albanian Women's Open, defeating Emma Parker 2–1 in the final.

At the inaugural Mongolia Women's Snooker World Cup in Ulaanbaatar in September 2024, Narantuya lost 0–3 to Ng in the semi-finals. She shared third place with India's Keerthana Pandian. Later that month, she reached the quarter-finals of the IBSF World Women's Six-red snooker Championship.

=== 2025 and 2026: Asian women's snooker champion ===
At the 2025 Asian Women's Snooker Championship at the QBSF Academy in Doha, Narantuya topped her group with 2–0 victories over Pandian, Ho Yee Ki and Saidehsadat Sanati. She then defeated Narucha Phoemphul in the quarter-finals, defending champion Ramachandran in the semi-finals and Ng in the final, all by 3–0, winning the title without dropping a frame. She was the first Mongolian player to win the title. In an interview, she credited the equipment and support provided by her Elite club as important factors in her development.

She retained the Asian title in February 2026, in Doha. Narantuya topped her group after defeating India's Aanya Patel 2–1 and Hong Kong's Ho Yee Ki 2–0. She then defeated Wan Ka Kai and Ho, both 3–0, to reach the final. She defeated Keerthana Pandian 3–1 in the final, making a break of 40 in the second frame.

In April 2026, she won a joint bronze medal in the women's competition at the Asian Heyball Open in Selangor, Malaysia. She reached the semi-finals of the Women's Snooker Open in Kuala Lumpur in October 2026, defeating Ng 3–1 in the quarter-finals before losing 3–4 to Nutcharut.

She has won thirteen Mongolian Women's Snooker Championship titles. She reached a career-high WWS ranking of 11 in November 2025.
