= 2023 World Women's Snooker Championship =

Women's snooker championship

Tournament information
- Dates: 28 February – 4 March 2023
- Venue: Hi-End Snooker Club
- City: Bangkok
- Country: Thailand
- Organisation: World Women's Snooker
- Total prize fund: £25,800
- Winner's share: £8,000
- Highest break: Bai Yulu (CHN), 127

Final
- Champion: Siripaporn Nuanthakhamjan (THA)
- Runner-up: Bai Yulu (CHN)
- Score: 6–3

The 2023 World Women's Snooker Championship was a women's snooker tournament that took place from 28 February to 4 March 2023 at the Hi-End Snooker Club in Bangkok, Thailand, sponsored by the venue and by the Billiard Sports Association of Thailand. The winner received £8,000 from a total prize fund of £25,800 and also earned a two-year tour card on the main professional World Snooker Tour from the start of the 2023–24 snooker season.

Mink Nutcharut was the defending champion, having defeated Wendy Jans 6–5 in the 2022 final, but she lost 2–5 to Siripaporn Nuanthakhamjan in the semi-finals. Nuanthakhamjan defeated Bai Yulu 6–3 in the final to win her first women's world title. The second Thai player to win the title, she entered the top 10 in the women's world rankings for the first time.

Bai's 127 break in her Group L match against Amee Kamani was the highest in the tournament's history, surpassing the 125 break made by Kelly Fisher at the 2003 event. It was the only century break of the tournament.

== Background ==
The Women's Professional Snooker Championship was held ten times between 1934 and 1950, with no tournaments staged between 1941 and 1947. Ruth Harrison won eight of those ten events. The Women's World Open, first held in 1976, is recognised as the beginning of the modern World Women's Snooker Championship. English player Reanne Evans holds the record for the most wins, having won 12 titles, including ten consecutive victories from 2005 to 2014.

=== Format ===
There were nine groups with four players and three groups with five players. The best eight of the twelve players who finished top of their group advanced to the last 16, while the remaining four players and the runners-up in their group advanced to the last 24. It is a single elimination knockout from the last 24 onwards.

== Prize fund ==
The breakdown of prize money for the event is shown below:

- Winner: £8,000
- Runner-up: £4,000
- Semi-final: £2,000
- Quarter-final: £1,000
- Last 16: £500
- Preliminary Round : £200
- Highest break: £200
- Total: £25,800

== Main draw ==
The draw and results for the knockout stage are shown below.

Last 24
Natasha Chetan (IND)	0
Mink Nutcharut (THA)	3
Rebecca Kenna (ENG)	3
Diana Schuler (GER)	0
Emma Parker (ENG)	0
Jamie Hunter (ENG)	3
Vidya Viswanathan Pillai (IND)	1
Bayarsaikhan Narantuya (MNG)	3
Tessa Davidson (ENG)	3
Natcharin Soraprasert (THA)	1
Ploychompoo Laokiatphong (THA)	3
Phakwalan Gong-gaew (THA)	0
Anupama Ramachandran (IND)	3
Panchaya Channoi (THA)	1
Maria Catalano (ENG)	3
Waratthanun Sukritthanes (THA)	1

Last 16
Mary Talbot-Deegan (ENG)	0
Mink Nutcharut (THA)	4
Rebecca Kenna (ENG)	4
Wendy Jans (BEL)	3
Siripaporn Nuanthakhamjan (THA)	4
Jamie Hunter (ENG)	3
Bayarsaikhan Narantuya (MNG)	4
On Yee Ng (HKG)	2
Reanne Evans (ENG)	4
Tessa Davidson (ENG)	0
Ploychompoo Laokiatphong (THA)	4
Steph Daughtery (ENG)	2
Bai Yulu (CHN)	4
Anupama Ramachandran (IND)	0
Maria Catalano (ENG)	4
Ho Yee Ki (HKG)	1

Quarter-finals
Mink Nutcharut (THA)	4
Rebecca Kenna (ENG)	2
Siripaporn Nuanthakhamjan (THA)	4
Bayarsaikhan Narantuya (MNG)	0
Reanne Evans (ENG)	4
Ploychompoo Laokiatphong (THA)	0
Bai Yulu (CHN)	4
Maria Catalano (ENG)	0

Semi-finals
Mink Nutcharut (THA)	2
Siripaporn Nuanthakhamjan (THA)	5
Reanne Evans (ENG)	3
Bai Yulu (CHN)	5

Final
Siripaporn Nuanthakhamjan (THA)	6
Bai Yulu (CHN)	3
