= 2026 Champion of Champions =

Snooker tournament

2026 Sportsbet.io Champion of Champions

Tournament information
- Dates: 9–15 November 2026
- Venue: Leicester Arena
- City: Leicester
- Country: England
- Organisation: Matchroom Sport
- Format: Non-ranking event
- Total prize fund: £440,000
- Winner's share: £150,000
- Highest break: Shaun Murphy (ENG) (142)

Final
- Champion: Kyren Wilson (ENG)
- Runner-up: Chris Wakelin (ENG)
- Score: 10–8

The 2026 Champion of Champions (officially the 2026 Sportsbet.io Champion of Champions) was a professional non-ranking snooker tournament that took place from 9 to 15 November 2026 at the Leicester Arena in Leicester, England. It featured 16 participants, all of whom won significant tournaments since the previous year's event. Part of the 2026–27 snooker season, it was the 16th edition of the Champion of Champions since the tournament was first held in 1978 and the 14th consecutive edition since it was revived in 2013. The winner received £150,000 from a total prize fund of £440,000.

Mark Selby was the defending champion, having defeated Judd Trump 10–5 in the 2025 final. He was beaten by Chris Wakelin 2–6 in the Group 1 final. Kyren Wilson defeated Wakelin in the final by 10–8.

== Overview ==
The Champion of Champions is a professional non-ranking snooker tournament that was first held in 1978, when it was contested by four players at the Wembley Conference Centre in London. The inaugural winner was Ray Reardon, who defeated Alex Higgins 11–9 in the final. After its second staging in 1980, the tournament was not held again until 2013, since which time it has been staged annually. As of 2026, the most successful player in its history is Ronnie O'Sullivan, who has won the title four times and been runner-up twice.

The 2026 edition of the tournament—the 16th staging overall and the 14th consecutively since its revival in 2013—took place from 9 to 15 November 2026 at the Leicester Arena in Leicester, England. Organised by Matchroom Sport, the tournament was sponsored by sports betting company Sportsbet.io. Mark Selby was the defending champion, having defeated Judd Trump 10–5 in the 2025 final, but he was beaten by Chris Wakelin 2–6 in the Group 1 final.

Kyren Wilson beat Wakelin 10–8 in the final. There were 18 century breaks made during the tournament, nine of which were made by Wilson. The highest break was a 142 made by Shaun Murphy.

=== Qualification ===
Players qualified by winning events throughout the previous year. The full list of competitors is below. Events shown below in grey are for players who had already qualified for the event.

Qualification table
Tournament	Date of tournament final	Winner
2025 Champion of Champions	16 November 2025	Mark Selby (ENG)
2025 Riyadh Season Championship	21 November 2025	Zhao Xintong (CHN)
2025 UK Championship	7 December 2025	Mark Selby (ENG)
2026 Masters	18 January 2026	Kyren Wilson (ENG)
2026 World Championship	4 May 2026	Wu Yize (CHN)
2026 German Masters	1 February 2026	Judd Trump (ENG)
2026 World Grand Prix	8 February 2026	Zhao Xintong (CHN)
2026 Players Championship	22 February 2026	Zhao Xintong (CHN)
2026 Tour Championship	5 April 2026	Zhao Xintong (CHN)
2025 International Championship	9 November 2025	Wu Yize (CHN)
2026 World Open	22 March 2026	Thepchaiya Un-Nooh (THA)
2026 China Open	16 August 2026	Mark Selby (ENG)
2026 Wuhan Open	29 August 2026	Chang Bingyu (CHN)
2026 Shenzhen Open	4 October 2026	Wu Yize (CHN)
2025 Scottish Open	21 December 2025	Chris Wakelin (ENG)
2026 Welsh Open	1 March 2026	Barry Hawkins (ENG)
2026 Championship League	15 July 2026	Jak Jones (WAL)
2026 British Open	6 September 2026	Jak Jones (WAL)
2026 English Open	13 September 2026	Ali Carter (ENG)
2026 Northern Ireland Open	25 October 2026	Kyren Wilson (ENG)
2025 Shoot Out	13 December 2025	Alfie Burden (ENG)
2026 World Women's Championship	19 May 2026	Panchaya Channoi (THA)
2026 World Championship (runner-up)	4 May 2026	Shaun Murphy (ENG)
2026 Championship League	11 February 2026	Mark Selby (ENG)
2026 Shanghai Masters	2 August 2026	Judd Trump (ENG)
2026 World Seniors Championship	10 May 2026	Ronnie O’Sullivan (ENG)
World Ranking Top-Up	N/A	Neil Robertson (AUS)

Player also qualified by winning another tournament

=== Prize fund ===
The breakdown of prize money for this event is shown below:

- Winner: £150,000
- Runner-up: £60,000
- Semi-finalist: £30,000
- Group runner-up: £17,500
- Group semi-finalist: £12,500
- Total: £440,000

== Summary ==
=== Group stages ===
==== Group 1 ====
Mark Selby, the defending champion, was beaten by Chris Wakelin 2–6 in the group final.

==== Group 4 ====
Neil Robertson beat Jak Jones 6–3 in the group final.

==== Group 3 ====
Shaun Murphy whitewashed Ronnie O'Sullivan in the group semi-final. Murphy then also whitewashed Chang Bingyu in the group final.

==== Group 2 ====
Kyren Wilson beat world number one Zhao Xintong 6–1 in the group final.

=== Semi-finals ===
In the first semi-final Wakelin beat Robertson 6–2.

In the second semi-final Wilson beat Murphy 6–4.

=== Final ===
The final was played on 15 November as the best of 19 frames, played over two sessions.

At the end of the afternoon session Wilson led Wakelin 6–3. Wison went on to win the match and the tournament 10–8 for his third consecutive title, following wins at the Northern Ireland Open and the International Championship.

== Tournament draw ==
The draw for the tournament is shown below. Numbers in the column to the left of the players' names denote the players' seeding, and players in bold denote match winners.

**Group semi-finals** **(last 16)**; Best of 7 frames
**1**	**Mark Selby (ENG)**	**4**
15	Alfie Burden (ENG)	3
**Group 1**
8	Barry Hawkins (ENG)	1
**9**	**Chris Wakelin (ENG)**	**4**
**4**	**Neil Robertson (AUS)**	**4**
16	Panchaya Channoi (THA)	2
**Group 4**
5	Judd Trump (ENG)	3
**12**	**Jak Jones (WAL)**	**4**
**6**	**Shaun Murphy (ENG)**	**4**
10	Ronnie O'Sullivan (ENG)	0
**Group 3**
3	Wu Yize (CHN)	3
**13**	**Chang Bingyu (CHN)**	**4**
**2**	**Zhao Xintong (CHN)**	**4**
14	Thepchaiya Un-Nooh (THA)	0
**Group 2**
**7**	**Kyren Wilson (ENG)**	**4**
11	Ali Carter (ENG)	2

**Group finals** **(quarter-finals)**; Best of 11 frames
Mark Selby (ENG)	2
**Chris Wakelin (ENG)**	**6**
**Neil Robertson (AUS)**	**6**
Jak Jones (WAL)	3
**Shaun Murphy (ENG)**	**6**
Chang Bingyu (CHN)	0
Zhao Xintong (CHN)	1
**Kyren Wilson (ENG)**	**6**

**Semi-finals**; Best of 11 frames
**Chris Wakelin (ENG)**	**6**
Neil Robertson (AUS)	2
Shaun Murphy (ENG)	4
**Kyren Wilson (ENG)**	**6**

**Final**; Best of 19 frames
9	Chris Wakelin (ENG)	8
**7**	**Kyren Wilson (ENG)**	**10**

=== Final: frame scores ===
Final: Best of 19 frames. Referee: Marcel Eckardt; Leicester Arena, Leicester, England, 15 November 2026
Chris Wakelin (9); England	8–**10**	**Kyren Wilson** (7); England
Afternoon: 0–**135** (135), 0–**87**, 0–**120** (115), 33–**92**, **86**–2, **112**–6, **75**–0, 40–**72**, 0–**107** (107); Evening: 31–**65**, 7–**67**, 1–**71**, **68**–31, **89**–36, **139**–0 (131), **82**–8, **66**–58, 0–**129** (112)
(frame 15) 131	Highest break	**135** (frame 1)
1	Century breaks	**4**

== Century breaks ==
A total of 18 century breaks were made during the tournament in Leicester.

- 142, 107 – Shaun Murphy
- 138, 135, 123, 115, 112, 110, 107, 104, 100 – Kyren Wilson
- 133 – Jak Jones
- 131, 117 – Chris Wakelin
- 130, 108 – Neil Robertson
- 109 – Alfie Burden
- 109 – Chang Bingyu
