= 2026 Masters =

2026 Masters may refer to:

- 2026 Masters Tournament, golf major, held April 9–12 in Augusta, Georgia, US
- 2026 Masters (curling), curling Grand Slam event
- 2026 PDC World Masters, darts tournament
- 2026 Masters (snooker), snooker tournament, held 11–18 January in London, England
