= 2025–26 snooker season =

Series of snooker tournaments

Details
- Duration: 30 June 2025 – 19 May 2026
- Tournaments: World Snooker Tour: 23 (18 ranking events); WPBSA Q Tour: 21; World Women's: 7 World Seniors: 11

Triple Crown winners
- UK Championship: Mark Selby (ENG)
- Masters: Kyren Wilson (ENG)
- World Championship: Wu Yize (CHN)

The 2025–26 snooker season was a professional snooker season featuring tournaments played between June 2025 and May 2026, including the professional World Snooker Tour, the second-tier Q Tour and featured events from World Women's Snooker and World Seniors Tour.

== Overview ==
The professional tour produced 15 different ranking event winners, the most of any season, with Wu Yize and Zhao Xintong the only players to win multiple ranking events. Wu secured his first ranking title at the 2025 International Championship, beating John Higgins 10–6 in the final, and went on to win the 2026 World Snooker Championship, defeating Shaun Murphy 18–17 in the final. Wu became the second-youngest World Champion, after Stephen Hendry in 1990. Zhao won the 2026 World Grand Prix, 2026 Players Championship, and 2026 Tour Championship, becoming the first player to win all three Player Series tournaments in the same season. After losing his first six ranking finals, Jack Lisowski won his maiden ranking title at the 2025 Northern Ireland Open, defeating Judd Trump 9–8 in the final. Alfie Burden claimed his first ranking title at the 2025 Shoot Out; at the age of 48 years and 364 days, he became the oldest maiden ranking event winner. For the first time, three consecutive ranking finals—the 2025 Saudi Arabia Masters, 2025 Wuhan Open, and 2025 English Open—went to deciding frames. The 2026 World Championship final was the fourth in Crucible history to go to a deciding frame, following the finals of the 1985, 1994, and 2002 editions.

The Class of '92 continued to set records for their longevity in the sport. Mark Williams won the 2025 Xi'an Grand Prix aged 50 years and 206 days, becoming the oldest ranking event winner. He surpassed Ray Reardon, who had won the 1982 Professional Players Tournament aged 50 years and 14 days. At the 2025 Saudi Arabia Masters, aged 49 years and 253 days, Ronnie O'Sullivan became the oldest player to record an official maximum break. At the 2026 Masters, aged 50 years and 245 days, John Higgins became the oldest finalist in any Triple Crown tournament, again surpassing Reardon, who had been 50 years and 114 days old when he played in the 1983 Masters final. At the 2026 Players Championship, aged 50 years and 280 days, Higgins became the second-oldest finalist at any ranking tournament, surpassed only by Rex Williams, who had been 53 years and 98 days old when he played in the final of the 1986 Grand Prix.

The season set a new record for the most maximum breaks in a single season, with 24, surpassing the previous record of 15 set in the previous season. O'Sullivan became the first player to make two maximum breaks in a one-session match, or on the same day, when he compiled the 16th and 17th maximums of his career in his 2025 Saudi Arabia Masters semi-final against Chris Wakelin. At the 2026 World Open, O'Sullivan made the highest break in professional snooker history, a 16-red clearance of 153 in his quarter-final match against Ryan Day. It was only the second break exceeding 147 compiled in professional competition, following Jamie Burnett's 148 in the qualifying rounds of the 2004 UK Championship. At the 2025 International Championship qualifiers in Sheffield, Neil Robertson made the 1,000th century break of his career, becoming the fourth player to reach that milestone, after O'Sullivan, Higgins, and Trump. At the main stage of the same tournament, Bai Yulu made a century of 145, setting a new record for the highest break by a female player in professional competition.

Panchaya Channoi won the 2026 World Women's Snooker Championship, defeating Reanne Evans 6–2 in the final to claim her first women's world title. O'Sullivan made his World Seniors Tour debut at the 2026 World Seniors Championship and went on to win the event, defeating Joe Perry 10–4 in the final.

== Players ==
The World Snooker Tour includes the top 64 players from the prize money rankings after the 2025 World Championship, plus the additional 31 players (Note: Lei Peifan was in the top 64 on the season-end ranking list, reducing this number from 32 to 31.) who earned a two-year card the previous year. Those 95 players were joined by the 34 players who acquired a two-year tour card this year to form a 128-player (Note: Although the tour was scheduled to contain 129 players, Graeme Dott was suspended just before the conclusion of the 2024–25 snooker season and remained so for the entirety of the 2025–26 season.) tour for the 2025–26 season.

=== New professional players ===
Zhao Xintong won the 2025 World Snooker Championship as an amateur and re-joined the top 64 in the official world rankings to secure professional status for the season. (Note: Zhao Xintong was previously the highest ranked player on the Q Tour rankings, but his performances in the 2025 World Snooker Championship removed him from the list as he re-joined the Top 64 of the official rankings in 11th place.)

The players listed below received a two-year tour card for the 2025–26 and 2026–27 seasons.

Top 4 players from the 2024–25 one-year ranking list

1. Ross Muir (SCO)
2. Jiang Jun (CHN)
3. Louis Heathcote (ENG)
4. Liam Graham (SCO)

International champions

5. WSF Open champion: Gao Yang (CHN)
6. WSF Junior champion: Leone Crowley (IRL)
7. EBSA European runner-up: (Note: The champion of the event, Liam Highfield, had already earned a professional tour card via the Q Tour Playoffs.) Michał Szubarczyk (POL)
8. EBSA European Under-21 champion: Iulian Boiko (UKR)
9. APSBF Asia Pacific champion: Chang Bingyu (CHN)
10. PABSA Americas champion: Sahil Nayyar (CAN)
11. ABSC African champion: Mahmoud El Hareedy (EGY)

Q Tour

Main article: 2024–25 Q Tour
12. Highest ranked: Dylan Emery (WAL)
13. Playoff: Steven Hallworth (ENG)
14. Playoff: Liam Highfield (ENG)
15. Playoff: Florian Nüßle (AUT)

CBSA China Tour

16. Yao Pengcheng (CHN)
17. Lan Yuhao (CHN)

World Women's Snooker qualifiers

18. Highest ranked: (Note: The Women's World Champion, Bai Yulu, had already gained a tour card for the 2024–25 and 2025–26 seasons the previous year.) Ng On-yee (HKG)
19. Second highest ranked: Reanne Evans (ENG)

Q School

Main article: 2025 Q School

Event 1

20. Liam Pullen (ENG)
21. Oliver Brown (ENG)
22. Alexander Ursenbacher (SUI)
23. Mateusz Baranowski (POL)

Event 2

24. David Grace (ENG)
25. Ian Burns (ENG)
26. Fergal Quinn (NIR)
27. Connor Benzey (ENG)

Asia-Oceania Event 1

28. Chatchapong Nasa (THA)
29. Liu Wenwei (CHN)

Asia-Oceania Event 2

30. Xu Yichen (CHN)
31. Zhao Hanyang (CHN)

Invitational Tour Card

32. Jimmy White (ENG)
33. Marco Fu (HKG)

Medical Exemption

34. Sam Craigie (ENG)

== Calendar ==
The following tables outline the dates and results for all the World Snooker Tour, World Women's Snooker Tour, World Seniors Tour, Q Tour, and other events in the season.

=== World Snooker Tour ===
Start	Finish	Tournament	Venue	Winner	Score	Runner-up	Ref.
30 Jun	23 Jul	Championship League	Leicester Arena in Leicester, England	Stephen Maguire (SCO)	3–1	Joe O'Connor (ENG)	
28 Jul	3 Aug	Shanghai Masters^{†}	Luwan Indoor Stadium in Shanghai, China	Kyren Wilson (ENG)	11–9	Ali Carter (ENG)	
8 Aug	16 Aug	Saudi Arabia Masters	Al-Faisal Sports City in Jeddah, Saudi Arabia	Neil Robertson (AUS)	10–9	Ronnie O'Sullivan (ENG)	
24 Aug	30 Aug	Wuhan Open	Optics Valley Gymnasium in Wuhan, China	Xiao Guodong (CHN)	10–9	Gary Wilson (ENG)	
11 Sep	21 Sep	English Open	Brentwood Centre in Brentwood, England	Mark Allen (NIR)	9–8	Zhou Yuelong (CHN)	
22 Sep	28 Sep	British Open	The Centaur in Cheltenham, England	Shaun Murphy (ENG)	10–7	Anthony McGill (SCO)	
7 Oct	13 Oct	Xi'an Grand Prix	Qujiang Sports Complex in Xi'an, China	Mark Williams (WAL)	10–3	Shaun Murphy (ENG)	
19 Oct	26 Oct	Northern Ireland Open	Waterfront Hall in Belfast, Northern Ireland	Jack Lisowski (ENG)	9–8	Judd Trump (ENG)	
2 Nov	9 Nov	International Championship	SNCNFC in Nanjing, China	Wu Yize (CHN)	10–6	John Higgins (SCO)	
10 Nov	16 Nov	Champion of Champions^{†}	Leicester Arena in Leicester, England	Mark Selby (ENG)	10–5	Judd Trump (ENG)	
19 Nov	21 Nov	Riyadh Season Championship^{†}	Boulevard City Global Theatre in Riyadh, Saudi Arabia	Zhao Xintong (CHN)	5–2	Neil Robertson (AUS)	
29 Nov	7 Dec	UK Championship	Barbican in York, England	Mark Selby (ENG)	10–8	Judd Trump (ENG)	
10 Dec	13 Dec	Shoot Out	Tower Circus in Blackpool, England	Alfie Burden (ENG)	1–0	Stuart Bingham (ENG)	
15 Dec	21 Dec	Scottish Open	Meadowbank Sports Centre in Edinburgh, Scotland	Chris Wakelin (ENG)	9–2	Chang Bingyu (CHN)	
11 Jan	18 Jan	Masters^{†}	Alexandra Palace in London, England	Kyren Wilson (ENG)	10–6	John Higgins (SCO)	
26 Jan	1 Feb	German Masters	Tempodrom in Berlin, Germany	Judd Trump (ENG)	10–4	Shaun Murphy (ENG)	
3 Feb	8 Feb	World Grand Prix	Kai Tak Arena in Kowloon City, Hong Kong	Zhao Xintong (CHN)	10–6	Zhang Anda (CHN)	
2 Jan	11 Feb	Championship League Invitational^{†}	Leicester Arena in Leicester, England	Mark Selby (ENG)	3–1	Wu Yize (CHN)	
17 Feb	22 Feb	Players Championship	Telford International Centre in Telford, England	Zhao Xintong (CHN)	10–7	John Higgins (SCO)	
23 Feb	1 Mar	Welsh Open	Venue Cymru in Llandudno, Wales	Barry Hawkins (ENG)	9–5	Jack Lisowski (ENG)	
16 Mar	22 Mar	World Open	Yushan Sport Centre in Yushan, China	Thepchaiya Un-Nooh (THA)	10–7	Ronnie O'Sullivan (ENG)	
30 Mar	5 Apr	Tour Championship	Manchester Central in Manchester, England	Zhao Xintong (CHN)	10–3	Judd Trump (ENG)	
18 Apr	4 May	World Championship	Crucible Theatre in Sheffield, England	Wu Yize (CHN)	18–17	Shaun Murphy (ENG)	

Ranking event
^{†} Non-ranking event

Note: This calendar only includes events that have been confirmed by the World Snooker Tour, and is subject to change at any time during the season.

=== WPBSA Q Tour ===
Start	Finish	Tournament	Venue	Winner	Score	Runner-up	Ref.
19 Jun	22 Jun	Americas – Event 1	Iate Club in Rio de Janeiro, Brazil	Igor Figueiredo (BRA)	5–1	Claudio Menechini (BRA)	
27 Jun	29 Jun	Asia Pacific – Event 1	Pot Black North Perth in Perth, Australia	Vinnie Calabrese (AUS)	5–0	Salman Asif (AUS)	
11 Jul	13 Jul	Asia Pacific – Event 2	Cuthberts Green in Christchurch, New Zealand	Cody Turner (NZL)	5–1	Mark Canovan (NZL)	
1 Aug	3 Aug	Asia Pacific – Event 3	Commercial Club Albury in Albury, Australia	Steve Mifsud (AUS)	4–0	Hassan Kerde (AUS)	
28 Aug	31 Aug	Europe – Event 1	Snookerhallen in Stockholm, Sweden	Hammad Miah (ENG)	4–2	Patrick Whelan (ENG)	
21 Sep	24 Sep	Middle East – Event 1	Cue Sports Academy in Dubai, UAE	Mostafa Dorgham (EGY)	4–2	Ali Jaleel (IRQ)	
25 Sep	28 Sep	Middle East – Event 2	Cue Sports Academy in Dubai, UAE	Ali Gharahgozlou (IRN)	4–2	Ali Jaleel (IRQ)	
25 Sep	28 Sep	Europe – Event 2	Austrian Snooker Academy in Vienna, Austria	Peter Lines (ENG)	4–3	Peter Devlin (ENG)	
9 Oct	12 Oct	Asia Pacific – Event 4	Mounties in Sydney, Australia	Vinnie Calabrese (AUS)	6–4	Hassan Kerde (AUS)	
9 Oct	12 Oct	Europe – Event 3	The Grand Blue Fafa Resort in Kavajë, Albania	Simon Blackwell (ENG)	4–3	Mark Joyce (ENG)	
29 Oct	1 Nov	Europe – Event 4	Northern Snooker Centre in Leeds, England	Jamie Clarke (WAL)	4–2	Craig Steadman (ENG)	
30 Oct	2 Nov	Americas – Event 2	H Niterói Hotel in Rio de Janeiro, Brazil	Igor Figueiredo (BRA)	5–0	Claudio Menechini (BRA)	
4 Dec	7 Dec	Europe – Event 5	Bulgarian Snooker Academy in Sofia, Bulgaria	Jamie Clarke (WAL)	4–2	Stuart Carrington (ENG)	
10 Jan	12 Jan	Americas – Event 3	The Corner Bank in Toronto, Canada	Alan Whitfield (CAN)	4–1	Jason Williams (CAN)	
20 Jan	23 Jan	Middle East – Event 3	Cue Sports Academy in Dubai, UAE	Siyavosh Mozayani (IRN)	4–2	Ali Alobaidli (QAT)	
23 Jan	26 Jan	Asia Pacific – Event 5	Redcliffe Snooker Club in Brisbane, Australia	Vinnie Calabrese (AUS)	5–1	Daniell Haenga (NZL)	
24 Jan	27 Jan	Middle East – Event 4	Cue Sports Academy in Dubai, UAE	Ali Ali (IRQ)	4–1	Emad Adnan (IRQ)	
12 Feb	15 Feb	Europe – Event 6	Delta Moon Snooker Club in Mons, Belgium	Ashley Carty (ENG)	4–1	Craig Steadman (ENG)	
13 Feb	16 Feb	Americas – Event 4	California Snooker Academy in San Jose, USA	Adam Nijiati (USA)	5–4	Hasanain Khalid Alsultani (USA)	
26 Feb	1 Mar	Europe – Event 7	Landywood Snooker Club in Great Wyrley, England	Ashley Hugill (ENG)	4–2	Alfie Davies (WAL)	
15 Mar	17 Mar	Global Play-Offs	Palace Hotel in Gandia, Spain	Ashley Carty (ENG)	10–8	Peter Lines (ENG)	
15 Mar	17 Mar	Global Play-Offs	Palace Hotel in Gandia, Spain	Ashley Hugill (ENG)	10–5	Mark Joyce (ENG)	
15 Mar	17 Mar	Global Play-Offs	Palace Hotel in Gandia, Spain	Craig Steadman (ENG)	10–7	Stuart Carrington (ENG)	

Ranking event (Q Tour Europe)
Non-ranking event (Q Tour Global)

=== World Women's Snooker Tour ===
Start	Finish	Tournament	Venue	Winner	Score	Runner-up	Ref.
29 Aug	31 Aug	UK Women's Championship	Northern Snooker Centre in Leeds, England	Bai Yulu (CHN)	4–2	Ng On-yee (HKG)	
4 Oct	7 Oct	Australian Women's Open	Mounties in Sydney, Australia	Ploychompoo Laokiatphong (THA)	4–1	Narucha Phoemphul (THA)	
27 Oct	30 Oct	Thai Women's Open	Hi-End Snooker Club in Bangkok, Thailand	Bai Yulu (CHN)	5–1	Ng On-yee (HKG)	
28 Nov	30 Nov	Irish Women's Open	SBI Academy in Carlow, Ireland	Bai Yulu (CHN)	4–2	Mink Nutcharut (THA)	
19 Jan	23 Jan	WSF Women's Championship	Marinela in Sofia, Bulgaria	Bai Yulu (CHN)	4–0	Ng On-yee (HKG)	
6 Feb	8 Feb	Belgian Women's Open	Trickshot in Bruges, Belgium	Ng On-yee (HKG)	4–2	Mink Nutcharut (THA)	
27 Mar	29 Mar	British Women's Open	Landywood Snooker Club in Walsall, England	Ng On-yee (HKG)	4–2	Bai Yulu (CHN)	
12 May	19 May	World Women's Championship	Changping Snooker Centre in Dongguan, China	Panchaya Channoi (THA)	6–2	Reanne Evans (ENG)	

=== World Seniors Tour ===
Start	Finish	Tournament	Venue	Winner	Score	Runner-up	Ref.
15 Aug	17 Aug	Seniors Tour – Event 1	Crucible Sports and Social Club in Reading, England	Alfie Burden (ENG)	4–1	Aaron Canavan (JER)	
26 Sep	28 Sep	Seniors Tour – Event 2	Crucible Sports and Social Club in Reading, England	Dharminder Lilly (ENG)	4–1	Daniel Ward (ENG)	
10 Oct	12 Oct	Seniors Tour – Event 3	Crucible Sports and Social Club in Reading, England	Gerard Greene (NIR)	4–2	Jamie Curtis-Barrett (ENG)	
21 Nov	23 Nov	Seniors Tour – Event 4	Crucible Sports and Social Club in Reading, England	Gerard Greene (NIR)	4–3	Alfie Burden (ENG)	
12 Dec	14 Dec	Seniors Tour – Event 5	Crucible Sports and Social Club in Reading, England	Daniel Ward (ENG)	4–2	Gerard Greene (NIR)	
26 Dec	28 Dec	British Seniors Open	Vaillant Live in Derby, England	Joe Perry (ENG)	7–5	Jimmy White (ENG)	
16 Jan	18 Jan	Seniors Tour – Event 6	Crucible Sports and Social Club in Reading, England	Gerard Greene (NIR)	4–0	Stuart Watson (ENG)	
6 Feb	8 Feb	Seniors Tour – Event 7	Crucible Sports and Social Club in Reading, England	Gerard Greene (NIR)	4–1	Daniel Stott (ENG)	
6 Mar	8 Mar	Seniors Tour – Event 8	Crucible Sports and Social Club in Reading, England	Aaron Canavan (JER)	4–2	Gerard Greene (NIR)	
3 Apr	5 Apr	Seniors Tour – Event 9	Crucible Sports and Social Club in Reading, England	Wayne Townsend (ENG)	4–0	Neal Jones (ENG)	
6 May	10 May	World Seniors Championship	Crucible Theatre in Sheffield, England	Ronnie O'Sullivan (ENG)	10–4	Joe Perry (ENG)	

=== Other events ===
Start	Finish	Tournament	Venue	Winner	Score	Runner-up	Ref.
10 Aug	13 Aug	World Games – Women's six-reds	Civil Aviation Flight University of China in Chengdu, China	Bai Yulu (CHN)	2–0	Narucha Phoemphul (THA)	
10 Aug	14 Aug	World Games – Men's singles	Civil Aviation Flight University of China in Chengdu, China	Xiao Guodong (CHN)	2–1	Michael Georgiou (CYP)	
3 Sep	7 Sep	Pan American Snooker Championship	Aryan Snooker Club in Sacramento, USA	Igor Figueiredo (BRA)	5–2	Fabio Anderson Luersen (BRA)	
5 Sep	9 Sep	Pink Ribbon	Landywood Snooker Club in Great Wyrley, England	Chris Wakelin (ENG)	5–3	Craig Steadman (ENG)	
17 Nov	19 Nov	Snooker 900 – Professionals League	Crucible Sports and Social Club in Reading, England	Stuart Bingham (ENG)	R-R	Mark Davis (ENG)	
24 Nov	25 Nov	Snooker 900 – Crucible Cup	Crucible Sports and Social Club in Reading, England	Neil Robertson (AUS)	7–5	John Higgins (SCO)	
9 Dec	20 Dec	SEA Games – Men's singles	Ambassador City Jomtien Hotel in Chonburi, Thailand	Passakorn Suwannawat (THA)	4–2	Kritsanut Lertsattayathorn (THA)	
9 Dec	20 Dec	SEA Games – Men's six-red singles	Ambassador City Jomtien Hotel in Chonburi, Thailand	Thor Chuan Leong (MYS)	5–2	Poramin Danjirakul (THA)	
9 Dec	20 Dec	SEA Games – Women's singles	Ambassador City Jomtien Hotel in Chonburi, Thailand	Mink Nutcharut (THA)	3–1	Panchaya Channoi (THA)	
9 Dec	20 Dec	SEA Games – Women's six-red singles	Ambassador City Jomtien Hotel in Chonburi, Thailand	Baipat Siripaporn (THA)	3–2	Mink Nutcharut (THA)	
9 Dec	20 Dec	SEA Games – Men's team	Ambassador City Jomtien Hotel in Chonburi, Thailand	Thailand	3–1	Laos	
9 Dec	20 Dec	SEA Games – Men's six-red team	Ambassador City Jomtien Hotel in Chonburi, Thailand	Malaysia	4–1	Philippines	
9 Dec	20 Dec	SEA Games – Women's team	Ambassador City Jomtien Hotel in Chonburi, Thailand	Thailand	3–0	Indonesia	
9 Dec	20 Dec	SEA Games – Women's six-red team	Ambassador City Jomtien Hotel in Chonburi, Thailand	Thailand	3–2	Indonesia	
11 Apr	12 Apr	Snooker 900 – John Virgo Trophy	Goffs in County Kildare, Ireland	Ronnie O'Sullivan (ENG)	6–0	John Higgins (SCO)	
12 May	17 May	Snooker 900 – Global Championship	Crucible Sports and Social Club in Reading, England	Ronnie O'Sullivan (ENG)	10–5	Luca Brecel (BEL)	

== Tournament rankings ==
=== World ranking points ===
The ranking points for reaching different stages of each ranking tournament are listed below.

Round Tournament	R144	R128	R112	R96	R80	R64	R48	R32	R24	R16	R12	QF	R6	SF	F	W
Championship League	—N/a	0 (Note: First stage fourth-placed)	—N/a	1,000 (Note: First stage third-placed)	—N/a	2,000 (Note: First stage runner-up)	—N/a	4,000 (Note: Second stage fourth-placed)	5,000 (Note: Second stage third-placed)	6,000 (Note: Second stage runner-up)	—N/a	8,000 (Note: Third stage fourth-placed)	9,000 (Note: Third stage third-placed)	11,000 (Note: Third stage runner-up)	23,000	33,000
Saudi Arabia Masters	0	—N/a	4,000 (Note: Players who lose their first match receive no ranking points.)	—N/a	7,000	—N/a	11,000	20,000	—N/a	30,000	—N/a	50,000	—N/a	100,000	200,000	500,000
Wuhan Open	—N/a	0	—N/a	—N/a	—N/a	4,500	—N/a	8,000	—N/a	12,000	—N/a	16,000	—N/a	30,000	63,000	140,000
English Open	—N/a	0	—N/a	1,000	—N/a	3,600	—N/a	5,400	—N/a	9,000	—N/a	13,200	—N/a	21,000	45,000	100,000
British Open	—N/a	0	—N/a	—N/a	—N/a	3,000	—N/a	6,000	—N/a	9,000	—N/a	12,000	—N/a	20,000	45,000	100,000
Xi'an Grand Prix	—N/a	0	—N/a	—N/a	—N/a	5,350	—N/a	9,400	—N/a	14,000	—N/a	22,350	—N/a	34,500	76,000	177,000
Northern Ireland Open	—N/a	0	—N/a	1,000	—N/a	3,600	—N/a	5,400	—N/a	9,000	—N/a	13,200	—N/a	21,000	45,000	100,000
International Championship	—N/a	0	—N/a	—N/a	—N/a	5,000	—N/a	9,000	—N/a	14,000	—N/a	22,000	—N/a	33,000	75,000	175,000
UK Championship	0	—N/a	2,500	—N/a	5,000	—N/a	7,500	10,000	—N/a	15,000	—N/a	25,000	—N/a	50,000	100,000	250,000
Shoot Out	—N/a	0	—N/a	—N/a	—N/a	500	—N/a	1,000	—N/a	2,000	—N/a	4,000	—N/a	8,000	20,000	50,000
Scottish Open	—N/a	0	—N/a	1,000	—N/a	3,600	—N/a	5,400	—N/a	9,000	—N/a	13,200	—N/a	21,000	45,000	100,000
German Masters	—N/a	0	—N/a	1,000	—N/a	3,600	—N/a	5,400	—N/a	9,000	—N/a	13,200	—N/a	21,000	45,000	100,000
World Grand Prix	—N/a	—N/a	—N/a	—N/a	—N/a	—N/a	—N/a	10,000	—N/a	15,000	—N/a	20,000	—N/a	35,000	80,000	180,000
Players Championship	—N/a	—N/a	—N/a	—N/a	—N/a	—N/a	—N/a	—N/a	—N/a	15,000	—N/a	20,000	—N/a	35,000	70,000	150,000
Welsh Open	—N/a	0	—N/a	1,000	—N/a	3,600	—N/a	5,400	—N/a	9,000	—N/a	13,200	—N/a	21,000	45,000	100,000
World Open	—N/a	0	—N/a	—N/a	—N/a	5,000	—N/a	9,000	—N/a	14,000	—N/a	22,000	—N/a	33,000	75,000	175,000
Tour Championship	—N/a	—N/a	—N/a	—N/a	—N/a	—N/a	—N/a	—N/a	—N/a	—N/a	20,000	30,000	—N/a	40,000	60,000	150,000
World Championship	0	—N/a	5,000	—N/a	10,000	—N/a	15,000	20,000	—N/a	30,000	—N/a	50,000	—N/a	100,000	200,000	500,000

== Player of the Month Award ==
The Player of the Month award was launched this season by WPBSA Players, the representative for snooker players within the WPBSA. The award recognises outstanding performance and is voted by fellow players.

Month	Winner	Best finish	Win rate	Ref.
Jun	Marco Fu (HKG)	Only qualifying matches played	100% (2/2)	
Jul	Stephen Maguire (SCO)	Winner (Championship League)	71.4% (5/7) (Note: Stephen Maguire had 8 wins, 1 draw and 1 loss in 10 Championship League matches. 3 wins in 3 matches were during the first group stage on 30 June.)	
Aug	Ronnie O'Sullivan (ENG)	Runner-up (Note: Ronnie O'Sullivan became the first player to make two maximums in a one-session match or on the same day in his 6–3 Saudi Arabia Masters semi-final victory over Chris Wakelin on 15 August.) (Saudi Arabia Masters)	80% (4/5)	
Sep	Shaun Murphy (ENG)	Winner (British Open)	90.9% (10/11)	
Oct	Jack Lisowski (ENG)	Winner (Northern Ireland Open)	100% (6/6)	
Nov	Wu Yize (CHN)	Winner (International Championship)	100% (7/7)	
Dec	Mark Selby (ENG)	Winner (UK Championship)	88.9% (8/9)	
Jan	Kyren Wilson (ENG)	Winner (Masters)	71.4% (10/14)	
Feb	Zhao Xintong (CHN)	Winner (World Grand Prix and Players Championship)	91.6% (11/12)	
Mar	Thepchaiya Un-Nooh (THA)	Winner (World Open)	85.8% (6/7)	
Apr	Antoni Kowalski (POL)	Last 32 (Note: Antoni Kowalski became the first Polish player to reach the main stages of the World Championship, avoiding relegation from the professional tour in the process.) (World Championship)	75% (3/4)	
May	Wu Yize (CHN) (2)	Winner (World Championship)	100% (2/2)	
