= Champion of Champions (snooker) =

Professional snooker tournament

Tournament information
- Venue: Mattioli Arena
- Location: Leicester
- Country: England
- Established: 1978
- Organisation(s): Matchroom Sport
- Format: Non-ranking event
- Total prize fund: £440,000
- Winner's share: £150,000
- Recent edition: 2026
- Current champion: Kyren Wilson (ENG)

The Champion of Champions is a professional non-ranking snooker tournament first held in 1978. Revived in 2013 by Matchroom Sport, replacing Premier League Snooker, the current format features winners of World Snooker (main tour, women's and seniors tour) events over the preceding 12 months, with the field topped up, if necessary, from the current world rankings. In 2020, the tournament had a prize fund of £440,000, of which £150,000 went to the winner.

The reigning champion is Kyren Wilson from England, who won the title for the first time in 2026.

== History ==
The event was created in 1978 by boxing promoter Mike Barrett. It was contested by four players at the Wembley Conference Centre in London, England, and was played over two days, with the semi-finals on the first day and the final on the second day. World Champion Ray Reardon beat that year's Masters winner Alex Higgins 11–9 in the final. Brief highlights were shown on ITV's World of Sport on the following afternoon. The event was not held in 1979, but appeared again in 1980 at the New London Theatre in Drury Lane, London, in a different format. Ten players competed in the tournament, split into two groups. Each group played a round robin, with the winners of the groups advancing to the final. Doug Mountjoy beat John Virgo 10–8 to become champion. The tournament was then abandoned, since the audiences had been poor and the event was financially unsuccessful.

It was revived in 2013 by Matchroom Sport, held in November at the Ricoh Arena in Coventry and contested by 16 of the world's leading players, the event was broadcast live in the United Kingdom on ITV4. The 2013 and 2014 tournaments were won by Ronnie O'Sullivan, but he chose not to defend the title in 2015; that year, Neil Robertson defeated Mark Allen 10–5 to claim his first win in the tournament. In 2016, John Higgins beat O'Sullivan 10–7. O'Sullivan was beaten by Shaun Murphy in the 2017 final too, but he took back the trophy in 2018, defeating Kyren Wilson 10–9. Robertson also won 10–9 against Judd Trump in the 2019 final, claiming the title for the second time. The 2020 final was a repeat of the final of the 2015 edition of the event, but this time Allen defeated Robertson 10–6. In 2021, Trump won 10–4 against Higgins, but he failed to defend the title in 2022, losing 6–10 to O'Sullivan, who won the tournament for the fourth time. Trump was runner-up again in 2023, suffering a 3–10 loss this time to Mark Allen, who became the third player to be champion more than once, after O'Sullivan and Robertson.

As a result of the global COVID-19 pandemic, the 2020 edition was relocated to the Marshall Arena in Milton Keynes, in order to create a secure bubble, the same way as all other snooker tournaments were played in that season. The 2021 edition was held in Bolton for the first time, featuring a change to the dress code, as all players had special shirts with their nickname on the back; this change was met with mixed response by the players.

== Winners ==
Year	Winner	Runner-up	Final score	Venue	City	Season
Early events (non-ranking, 1978–1980)
1978	Ray Reardon (WAL)	Alex Higgins (NIR)	11–9	Wembley Conference Centre	London	1978/79
1980	Doug Mountjoy (WAL)	John Virgo (ENG)	10–8	New London Theatre	London	1980/81
Matchroom Sport revival (non-ranking, 2013–present)
2013	Ronnie O'Sullivan (ENG)	Stuart Bingham (ENG)	10–8	Ricoh Arena	Coventry	2013/14
2014	Ronnie O'Sullivan (ENG)	Judd Trump (ENG)	10–7	Ricoh Arena	Coventry	2014/15
2015	Neil Robertson (AUS)	Mark Allen (NIR)	10–5	Ricoh Arena	Coventry	2015/16
2016	John Higgins (SCO)	Ronnie O'Sullivan (ENG)	10–7	Ricoh Arena	Coventry	2016/17
2017	Shaun Murphy (ENG)	Ronnie O'Sullivan (ENG)	10–8	Ricoh Arena	Coventry	2017/18
2018	Ronnie O'Sullivan (ENG)	Kyren Wilson (ENG)	10–9	Ricoh Arena	Coventry	2018/19
2019	Neil Robertson (AUS)	Judd Trump (ENG)	10–9	Ricoh Arena	Coventry	2019/20
2020	Mark Allen (NIR)	Neil Robertson (AUS)	10–6	Marshall Arena	Milton Keynes	2020/21
2021	Judd Trump (ENG)	John Higgins (SCO)	10–4	Toughsheet Community Stadium	Bolton	2021/22
2022	Ronnie O'Sullivan (ENG)	Judd Trump (ENG)	10–6	Toughsheet Community Stadium	Bolton	2022/23
2023	Mark Allen (NIR)	Judd Trump (ENG)	10–3	Toughsheet Community Stadium	Bolton	2023/24
2024	Mark Williams (WAL)	Xiao Guodong (CHN)	10–6	Toughsheet Community Stadium	Bolton	2024/25
2025	Mark Selby (ENG)	Judd Trump (ENG)	10–5	Leicester Arena	Leicester	2025/26
2026	Kyren Wilson (ENG)	Chris Wakelin (ENG)	10–8	Leicester Arena	Leicester	2026/27

== Finalists ==
Name	Nationality	Winner	Runner-up	Finals
**Ronnie O'Sullivan**	England	4	2	6
**Neil Robertson**	Australia	2	1	3
**Mark Allen**	Northern Ireland	2	1	3
**Judd Trump**	England	1	5	6
**John Higgins**	Scotland	1	1	2
**Kyren Wilson**	England	1	1	2
Ray Reardon	Wales	1	0	1
Doug Mountjoy	Wales	1	0	1
**Shaun Murphy**	England	1	0	1
**Mark Williams**	Wales	1	0	1
**Mark Selby**	England	1	0	1
Alex Higgins	Northern Ireland	0	1	1
John Virgo	England	0	1	1
**Stuart Bingham**	England	0	1	1
**Xiao Guodong**	China	0	1	1
**Chris Wakelin**	England	0	1	1

Legend
The names of active players are marked in **bold**.

== See also ==
- Champions Cup (snooker)
