= Panchaya Channoi =

Thai snooker player

Personal information
- Nickname: Mind
- Born: 12 February 2008 (age 18)

Sport
- Country: Thailand
- Sport: Snooker
- Professional: 2026–present
- Highest ranking: World Women's Snooker: 7
- Current ranking: 126 (as of 7 November 2026)
Medal record
Women's snooker
Representing Thailand
SEA Games
Gold medal – first place	2025 Bangkok	Snooker singles
Silver medal – second place	2025 Bangkok	Snooker team

Panchaya Channoi (Thai: ปัณชญา จันทร์น้อย; born 12 February 2008) is a Thai professional snooker player. She won the World Women's Snooker Under-21 Championship in 2025 aged 16 and retained it in 2026. She competes on the main tour from the 2026-27 season after winning the 2026 World Women's Snooker Championship.

== Biography ==
Panchaya Channoi was born on 12 February 2008 and attended Thepleela School. Her family runs a snooker table business. She first competed on the World Women's Snooker circuit at the 2019 World Women's Snooker Championship aged ten, and won two matches. In 2022, she won the IBSF World Under-21 Snooker Championship by defeating Anupama Ramachandran 4–1 in the final. She was a semi-finalist in the IBSF World Snooker Championship that year, but lost 0–4 to Vidya Pillai.

At the 2025 World Women's Snooker Championship she reached the last-16 round, where she lost 3–4 to the eventual champion Bai Yulu. Together with Mink Nutcharut and Ploychompoo Laokiatphong, she was part of the Thailand team that won the women's snooker team event at the 2025 SEA Games. A few days later, she was runner-up to Nutcharut in the individual women's SEA championship.

She was runner-up in the Women's Asian Snooker Championship in 2023 and 2024. Channoi won the World Snooker Federation (WSF) Women's Under-21 Championship in 2026 with a 2–1 defeat of Narucha Phoemphul, who was top of the under-21 rankings, in the final. She also reached the semi-finals of the main championship, but lost 2–4 to Ng On-yee.

Channoi won the 2026 World Women's Snooker Championship by beating twelve-time winner Reanne Evans 6–2 in the final, compatriot Mink Nutcharut 5–3 in the semi-finals and reigning champion Bai Yulu 4–3 in the quarter-finals, all of whom were in the top four in World Women's Snooker rankings at the time. By winning the event she has also attained a two-year tour card to play on the World Snooker Tour from the 2026-27 season. Aged 18, she became the youngest winner of the event since Ann-Marie Farren won it aged 16 in 1987. She also won the under-21 title, recovering from 0-2 behind to win 3–2 against Wang Ruotong.

She is nicknamed "Mind" or "Mind Sakol". She has been coached by Ajarn Tik Sakol and Ajarn It Sittai. As of May 2026 she was ranked 7th by World Women's Snooker, a career high.

== Performance and rankings timeline ==
Tournament	2026/ 27
Ranking (Note: It shows the ranking at the beginning of the season)	(Note: Players qualified through Women's Tour started the season without ranking points)
Ranking tournaments
Championship League	RR
China Open	LQ
Wuhan Open	LQ
British Open	LQ
English Open	LQ
Shenzhen Open	LQ
Northern Ireland Open	LQ
International Championship	LQ
UK Championship	LQ
Shoot Out	
Scottish Open	
German Masters	LQ
Welsh Open	
World Grand Prix	
Players Championship	
World Open	
Tour Championship	
World Championship	
Non-ranking tournaments
Champion of Champions	1R

Performance Table Legend
LQ	lost in the qualifying draw	#R	lost in the early rounds of the tournament (WR = Wildcard round, RR = Round robin)	QF	lost in the quarter-finals
SF	lost in the semi-finals	F	lost in the final	W	won the tournament
DNQ	did not qualify for the tournament	A	did not participate in the tournament	WD	withdrew from the tournament

NH / Not Held	means an event was not held
NR / Non-Ranking Event	means an event is/was no longer a ranking event
R / Ranking Event	means an event is/was a ranking event
MR / Minor-Ranking Event	means an event is/was a minor-ranking event

== Career finals ==
=== World Women's Snooker Tour ===
Legend
Women's World Championship (1–0)

Outcome	No.	Year	Championship	Opponent in the final	Score	Ref.
Winner	1.	2026	Women's World Championship	Reanne Evans (ENG)	6–2	

=== Other Events ===
Outcome	No.	Year	Championship	Opponent in the final	Score	Ref.
Winner	1.	2022	IBSF World Under-21 Women's Championship	Anupama Ramachandran (IND)	4–1	
Runner-up	1.	2023	ACBS Asian Women's Championship	Bai Yulu (CHN)	0–3	
Runner-up	2.	2024	ACBS Asian Women's Championship	Anupama Ramachandran (IND)	1–3	
Winner	2.	2025	World Women's Under-21 Championship	Liu Ziling (CHN)	3–1	
Runner-up	3.	2025	SEA Games – Women's singles	Mink Nutcharut (THA)	1–3	
Winner	3.	2026	WSF Women's Under-21 Championship	Narucha Phoemphul (THA)	2–1	
Winner	4.	2026	Belgian Women's Open Under-21	Narucha Phoemphul (THA)	2–0	
Winner	5.	2026	World Women's Under-21 Championship	Wang Ruotong (CHN)	3–2	
