= Chris Wakelin =

English snooker player

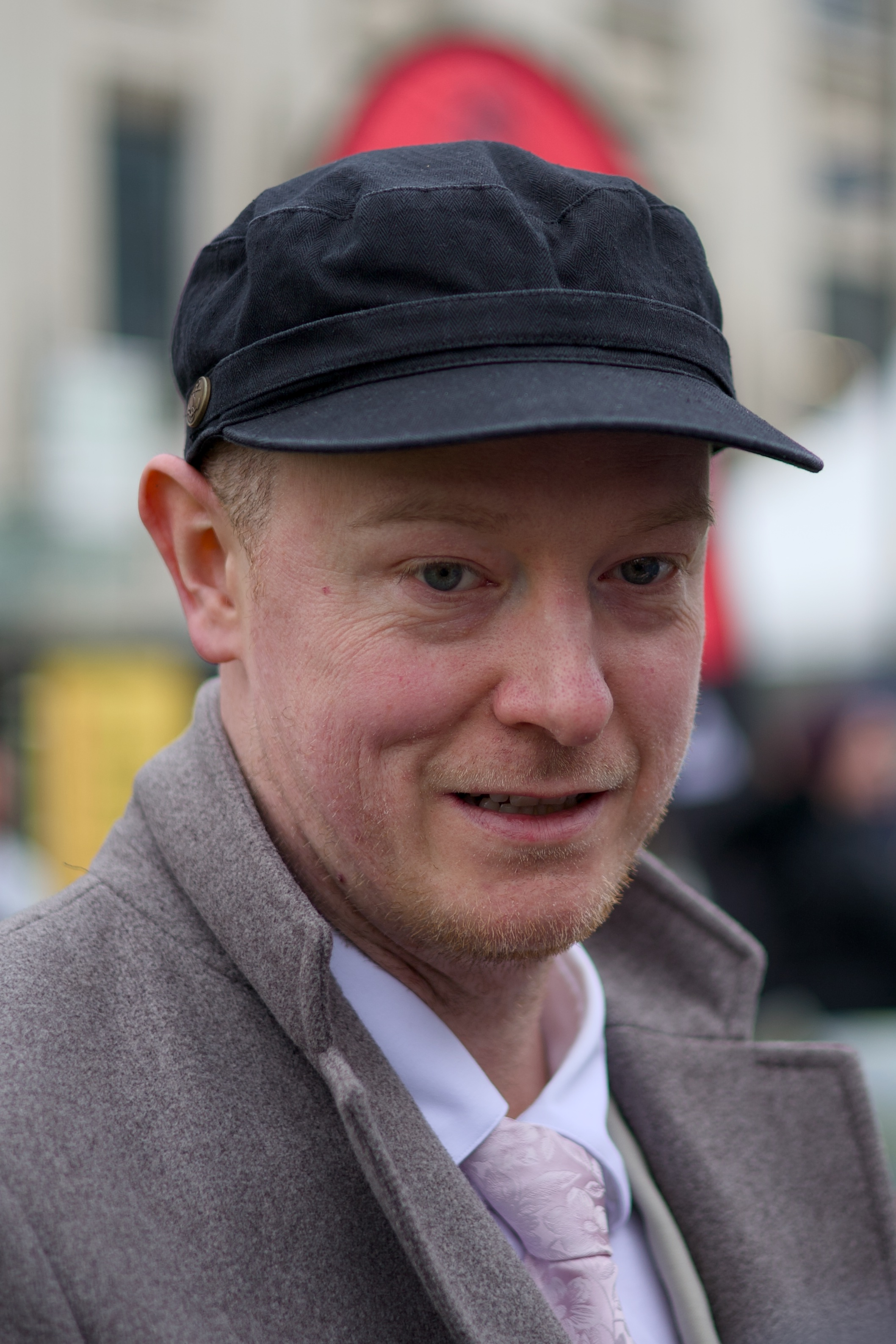
- Wakelin at the World Snooker Green Carpet Ceremony 2026

Personal information
- Nickname: The Monster
- Born: 16 March 1992 (age 34) Rugby, Warwickshire, England

Sport
- Country: England
- Sport: Snooker
- Professional: 2013–present
- Highest ranking: 11 (4 October 2026)
- Current ranking: 12 (as of 7 November 2026)
- Maximum breaks: 1
- Century breaks: 157 (as of 15 November 2026)

Tournament wins
- Ranking: 2

Chris Wakelin (born 16 March 1992) is an English professional snooker player from Rugby, Warwickshire. He turned professional in 2013 and has won two ranking titles: the 2023 Snooker Shoot Out and the 2025 Scottish Open.

== Career ==
=== Early career ===
Wakelin started playing snooker aged 8, when his parents Mark and Angie bought him his first mini snooker table, and by the time he was 11 he was successfully playing in the local league.In 2012 Wakelin decided to give the game another go, but soon had to face more difficulties as family issues resulted in a severe depression: "I could line up but I just couldn’t pot. I thought I would never play again. But thankfully with the help of my friends I managed to turn it around." Since then Wakelin reached the semi-finals of the 2013 English Amateur Championship, before making it through to the England's Under 21 final (where he would later beat Hammad Miah).

These results encouraged him to enter 2013 Q School in May. After having made it to the final round of the first event, he again reached the final round at the Event 3. There he faced former professional Adam Wicheard, who led 2‍–‍0 before Wakelin hit back to lead 3‍–‍2. Then, in the sixth frame when Wakelin had been already 23‍–‍0 up, Wicheard accidentally snapped his cue when leaning on it, and had to concede the match. As a result, Wakelin won a tour card for the 2013–14 and 2014–15 seasons.

=== 2013–2017 ===
Wakelin had a tough debut season as a professional as he lost his opening match in all the ranking tournaments aside from the UK Championship, where he defeated 22nd seed Ryan Day 6‍–‍5 before losing by the same scoreline to Jamie Burnett in the subsequent round. He had better results in the minor-ranking European Tour events, reaching the last 32 of the Rotterdam Open before going all the way to the quarter-finals of the Kay Suzanne Memorial Cup, where he lost 2‍–‍4 to Judd Trump. Wakelin's season ended when he was edged out 9‍–‍10 by Paul Davison in the first round of World Championship qualifying, with him ranked world number 106 after his first year on tour.

Wakelin's second season on the tour was a vast improvement on his first. He beat Tom Ford 5–2 to qualify for the 2014 Wuxi Classic and in his first appearance in a ranking event outside of the UK he overcame Joe O'Connor 5‍–‍2, before losing 2‍–‍5 to Shaun Murphy. At the minor-ranking Ruhr Open, Wakelin overcame Matthew Stevens 4‍–‍1 and then fought back from 0‍–‍3 and needing two snookers in the deciding frame to beat Thepchaiya Un-Nooh 4‍–‍3. A 4‍–‍2 win over Fergal O'Brien saw him reach the quarter-finals where he lost 1‍–‍4 to Trump. At the Indian Open, Wakelin beat Rhys Clark 4‍–‍2, Andrew Pagett 4‍–‍1 and Nigel Bond 4‍–‍1 to play in the quarter-finals of a ranking event for the first time. He was 2‍–‍1 ahead of Michael White but lost 2‍–‍4.

Wakelin's performances in the European Tour events this season saw him finish a lofty 22nd on the Order of Merit to earn a new two-year tour card. It also gave him entry into the Grand Final where he whitewashed Robert Milkins 4‍–‍0, before Matthew Selt ousted Wakelin 4‍–‍2 in the second round.

In June 2015, Wakelin saw off Alex Taubman 5‍–‍1, Craig Steadman 5‍–‍0, and Liam Highfield 5‍–‍2, to reach the final qualifying round of the Australian Goldfields Open, but he then lost 3‍–‍5 to Jamie Jones. A 6‍–‍4 victory over Peter Lines saw him qualify for the International Championship, where he lost 4‍–‍6 to Barry Hawkins having led 3‍–‍1. Wakelin beat Stevens 6‍–‍5 on the final black in the first round of the UK Championship and apologized to his opponent for an exuberant celebration at the end in a win he described as one of his best. He was defeated 2‍–‍6 by Michael Holt in the second round. Wakelin qualified for the China Open by eliminating Kurt Maflin 5‍–‍3 and was edged out 4‍–‍5 by Selt in the first round. After beating world number 25 and former practice partner Ben Woollaston 10‍–‍9, Wakelin looked set to reach the final qualifying round for the World Championship after leading Anthony Hamilton 4‍–‍0 and 9‍–‍6, but he went on to lose 9‍–‍10.

Wins over Allan Taylor and Anthony McGill saw Wakelin set up a third-round encounter with Ronnie O'Sullivan in the 2016 English Open. Wakelin recovered from 0‍–‍2 down to triumph 4‍–‍3 in a performance that included a century and two other breaks above 50. He then edged past Xiao Guodong 4‍–‍3 after trailing 1‍–‍3 to play in the quarter-finals, where he lost 0‍–‍5 to Stuart Bingham. Wakelin was defeated 4‍–‍6 by Lines in the second round of the UK Championship and 0‍–‍4 by Anthony Hamilton in the third round of the Scottish Open. Wakelin ended a season inside the top 64 for the first time as he was the world number 63.

=== 2018–2022 ===
Wakelin qualified for the 2018 World Championship where he made his debut appearance at the Crucible Theatre. He delivered a strong performance against Judd Trump in the first round; recovering from 3‍–‍6 and 4‍–‍8 down, Wakelin levelled the match at 8‍–‍8 before losing 9‍–‍10 on the deciding frame. He compiled a 141 break in the first session, the highest of his career.

At the end of the 2017–18 season, Wakelin joined the top 50 players in the snooker world rankings. He reached the quarter-final stage of the 2018 Riga Masters ranking tournament in Latvia by defeating Jamie Jones 4‍–‍0 and Mark King 4‍–‍3; he then lost 2‍–‍4 to Stuart Carrington in the quarter-finals.

In 2021, Wakelin qualified for the main stage of the World Championship for the second time in his career, defeating Xiao Guodong 10‍–‍7 in the last qualifying round. He then endured a 4‍–‍10 first-round defeat to David Gilbert. He qualified for the main stage of the World Championship for a third time in 2022 but was again eliminated in the first round, losing 6‍–‍10 to Yan Bingtao.

=== 2023–present ===
Wakelin won his first ranking title in January 2023, beating Julien Leclercq in the final of the BetVictor Snooker Shoot Out, making a tournament-high break of 119 in the single-frame match. The £55,000 total prize money lifted Wakelin from 47th to 33rd in the world rankings. He beat former world champion Neil Robertson at the German Masters in February; however, his 16-match winning streak came to an end in the quarter-finals where he was defeated 2‍–‍5 by Robert Milkins. He reached his second ranking event final at the 2023 Northern Ireland Open in Belfast; after taking an early 2‍–‍1 lead against Judd Trump, he was eventually defeated 3‍–‍9.

In September 2024, Wakelin was a semi-finalist at the English Open after beating Mark Allen 5‍–‍2 in the quarter-finals, but he was heavily defeated 1‍–‍6 by Robertson in their semi-final match. The following month, he progressed to the final of the International Championship in China, where he lost 7‍–‍10 to Ding Junhui after establishing a 1‍–‍4 lead in the first session. His route to his third ranking event final included wins over Shaun Murphy, Mark Williams and John Higgins, all former world champions. The prize money from this tournament helped elevate him into the world's top 16 for the first time in his career.

Wakelin reached the last 16 of the 2024 UK Championship where he was defeated 2‍–‍6 by Kyren Wilson. He made his first-ever appearance in the Masters tournament in 2025 but lost in the first round 3‍–‍6 to Luca Brecel.

Ranked World No.20, Wakelin qualified for the 2025 World Championship, having failed to qualify for the main tournament for the previous two years. He beat ninth seed Neil Robertson 10‍–‍8 in the first round for his first ever Crucible match victory. He then defeated eighth seed Mark Allen 13‍–‍6 in the last 16, after developing a 10‍–‍2 lead in the second session, but was then knocked out of the competition at the quarter-final stage, 5‍–‍13, by amateur Chinese player Zhao Xintong.

Wakelin won his second career ranking title after defeating Chang Bingyu 9‍–‍2 in the final of the 2025 Scottish Open.

== Personal life ==
Wakelin worked full-time as a delivery driver for ASDA before joining the professional snooker tour. Since 2021, Wakelin was involved with Strictly Christmas, a local spin-off of Strictly Come Dancing, raising money for Zoe's Place Baby Hospice in Coventry. He credited his 2023 Shoot Out win to his running and ballroom dancing, saying: "Just being a part of that was life changing. We had visits to the hospice to see the children, staff and families to understand what it is we're raising money for. As cutting and difficult as it was to see, it inspired me to help out as much as I can."

== Performance and rankings timeline ==
Tournament	2012/ 13	2013/ 14	2014/ 15	2015/ 16	2016/ 17	2017/ 18	2018/ 19	2019/ 20	2020/ 21	2021/ 22	2022/ 23	2023/ 24	2024/ 25	2025/ 26	2026/ 27
Ranking (Note: It shows the ranking at the beginning of the season)	(Note: He was an amateur)	(Note: New players on the Main Tour don't have a ranking)	106	(Note: Players qualified through European Tour Order of Merit started the season without prize money ranking points)	83	63	48	48	57	60	43	29	24	16	13
Ranking tournaments
Championship League	Non-Ranking Event								RR	RR	2R	3R	2R	2R	2R
China Open	A	LQ	LQ	1R	LQ	2R	1R	Tournament Not Held							2R
Wuhan Open	Tournament Not Held											1R	QF	LQ	2R
British Open	Tournament Not Held									1R	LQ	1R	3R	LQ	1R
English Open	Tournament Not Held				QF	1R	2R	2R	1R	2R	LQ	2R	SF	2R	2R
Shenzhen Open (Note: The event was called the Xi'an Grand Prix (2024/2025–2025/2026))	Tournament Not Held												2R	LQ	QF
Northern Ireland Open	Tournament Not Held				2R	4R	2R	1R	1R	1R	LQ	F	2R	2R	1R
International Championship	A	LQ	LQ	1R	1R	LQ	1R	1R	Not Held			1R	F	1R	2R
UK Championship	A	2R	1R	2R	2R	2R	2R	2R	2R	2R	LQ	LQ	2R	LQ	
Shoot Out	Non-Ranking Event				2R	1R	1R	2R	2R	4R	W	2R	1R	A	
Scottish Open	MR	Not Held			3R	2R	1R	4R	2R	1R	LQ	QF	QF	W	
German Masters	A	LQ	LQ	LQ	LQ	LQ	LQ	LQ	LQ	LQ	QF	1R	1R	LQ	
Welsh Open	A	1R	2R	1R	2R	2R	1R	1R	1R	1R	1R	1R	2R	1R	
World Grand Prix	Not Held		NR	DNQ	DNQ	DNQ	DNQ	DNQ	DNQ	DNQ	DNQ	1R	1R	QF	
Players Championship (Note: The event was called the Players Tour Championship Grand Final (2012/2013-2015/2016))	DNQ	DNQ	2R	DNQ	DNQ	DNQ	DNQ	DNQ	DNQ	DNQ	1R	1R	1R	QF	
World Open	A	LQ	Not Held		LQ	2R	1R	LQ	Not Held			3R	WD	WD	
Tour Championship	Tournament Not Held						DNQ	DNQ	DNQ	DNQ	DNQ	DNQ	DNQ	QF	
World Championship	A	LQ	LQ	LQ	LQ	1R	LQ	LQ	1R	1R	LQ	LQ	QF	2R	
Non-ranking tournaments
Shanghai Masters	Ranking Event						A	A	Not Held			A	A	2R	2R
Champion of Champions	NH	A	A	A	A	A	A	A	A	A	A	1R	A	A	F
The Masters	A	A	A	A	A	A	A	A	A	A	A	A	1R	1R	
Championship League	A	A	A	A	A	A	A	RR	A	A	A	2R	WD	RR	
Former ranking tournaments
Wuxi Classic	A	LQ	2R	Tournament Not Held											
Australian Goldfields Open	A	LQ	LQ	LQ	Tournament Not Held										
Shanghai Masters	A	LQ	LQ	LQ	LQ	1R	Non-Ranking		Not Held			Non-Ranking Event			
Paul Hunter Classic	Minor-Ranking Event				2R	4R	4R	NR	Tournament Not Held						
Indian Open	NH	LQ	QF	NH	LQ	LQ	3R	Tournament Not Held							
Riga Masters (Note: The event was called the Riga Open (2014/2015–2015/2016))	Not Held		MR		1R	LQ	QF	LQ	Tournament Not Held						
China Championship	Tournament Not Held				NR	1R	1R	3R	Tournament Not Held						
WST Pro Series	Tournament Not Held								RR	Tournament Not Held					
Turkish Masters	Tournament Not Held									1R	Tournament Not Held				
Gibraltar Open	Not Held			MR	2R	1R	3R	2R	QF	3R	Tournament Not Held				
WST Classic	Tournament Not Held										2R	Tournament Not Held			
European Masters	Tournament Not Held				LQ	2R	1R	LQ	2R	LQ	2R	2R	Not Held		
Saudi Arabia Masters	Tournament Not Held												4R	SF	NH
Former non-ranking tournaments
Shoot Out	A	A	2R	A	Ranking Event										
Six-red World Championship	A	A	A	A	A	A	A	A	Not Held		2R	Tournament Not Held			

Performance Table Legend
LQ	lost in the qualifying draw	#R	lost in the early rounds of the tournament (WR = Wildcard round, RR = Round robin)	QF	lost in the quarter-finals
SF	lost in the semi-finals	F	lost in the final	W	won the tournament
DNQ	did not qualify for the tournament	A	did not participate in the tournament	WD	withdrew from the tournament

NH / Not Held	means an event was not held.
NR / Non-Ranking Event	means an event is/was no longer a ranking event.
R / Ranking Event	means an event is/was a ranking event.
MR / Minor-Ranking Event	means an event is/was a minor-ranking event.

== Career finals ==
=== Ranking finals: 4 (2 titles) ===
Outcome	No.	Year	Championship	Opponent in the final	Score
Winner	1.	2023	Snooker Shoot Out	(Belgium) Julien Leclercq	1–0
Runner-up	1.	2023	Northern Ireland Open	(England) Judd Trump	3–9
Runner-up	2.	2024	International Championship	(China) Ding Junhui	7–10
Winner	2.	2025	Scottish Open	(China) Chang Bingyu	9–2

=== Non-ranking finals: 1 ===
Outcome	No.	Year	Championship	Opponent in the final	Score
Runner-up	1.	2026	Champion of Champions	(England) Kyren Wilson	8–10

=== Pro-am finals: 1 (1 title) ===
Outcome	No.	Year	Championship	Opponent in the final	Score
Winner	1.	2025	Pink Ribbon	(England) Craig Steadman	5–3

=== Amateur finals: 1 (1 title) ===
Outcome	No.	Year	Championship	Opponent in the final	Score
Winner	1.	2013	English Under-21 Championship	(England) Hammad Miah	8–4
