= 2026 Masters (snooker) =

Snooker tournament

2026 Johnstone's Paint Masters
- Part of the snooker Triple Crown

Tournament information
- Dates: 11–18 January 2026
- Venue: Alexandra Palace
- City: London
- Country: England
- Organisation: World Snooker Tour
- Format: Non-ranking event
- Total prize fund: £1,015,000
- Winner's share: £350,000
- Highest break: Wu Yize (CHN) (137)

Final
- Champion: Kyren Wilson (ENG)
- Runner-up: John Higgins (SCO)
- Score: 10–6

The 2026 Masters (officially the 2026 Johnstone's Paint Masters) was a professional non-ranking snooker tournament that took place from 11 to 18 January 2026 at Alexandra Palace in London, England. The second Triple Crown event of the 2025–26 snooker season, following the 2025 UK Championship and preceding the 2026 World Championship, the tournament was the 52nd edition of the Masters, which had been held annually since 1975. It was broadcast by the BBC and TNT Sports domestically, by Eurosport in mainland Europe, by local channels in China and elsewhere in Asia, and by WST Play in all other territories. The winner received £350,000 from a total prize fund of £1,015,000.

The top 16 players in the snooker world rankings, as they stood after the UK Championship, were invited to the event. Ronnie O'Sullivan withdrew on medical grounds and was replaced in the draw by Chris Wakelin, who had been 17th in the world rankings after the UK Championship. Wu Yize and Xiao Guodong made their Masters debuts at the event, where they were among a record five participants from mainland China. Wu reached the semi-finals, the first debutant to do so since Yan Bingtao in 2021.

Shaun Murphy was the defending champion, having defeated Kyren Wilson 10–7 in the 2025 final, but Wu beat him 6–2 in the first round. All eight first-round matches ended in 6–2 scorelines, the odds of which were estimated at 220,000 to 1. John Higgins made a record-extending 32nd Masters appearance and reached the final, becoming the oldest Triple Crown finalist in snooker history, aged 50 years and 245 days. Kyren Wilson reached his third Masters final, where he defeated Higgins 10–6 to win his first Masters title and second Triple Crown title. The final of the event was the last match to feature televised commentary by broadcaster John Virgo, who died 17 days later. The tournament produced 24 century breaks, of which the highest was a 137 by Wu in his first-round match against Murphy.

== Overview ==
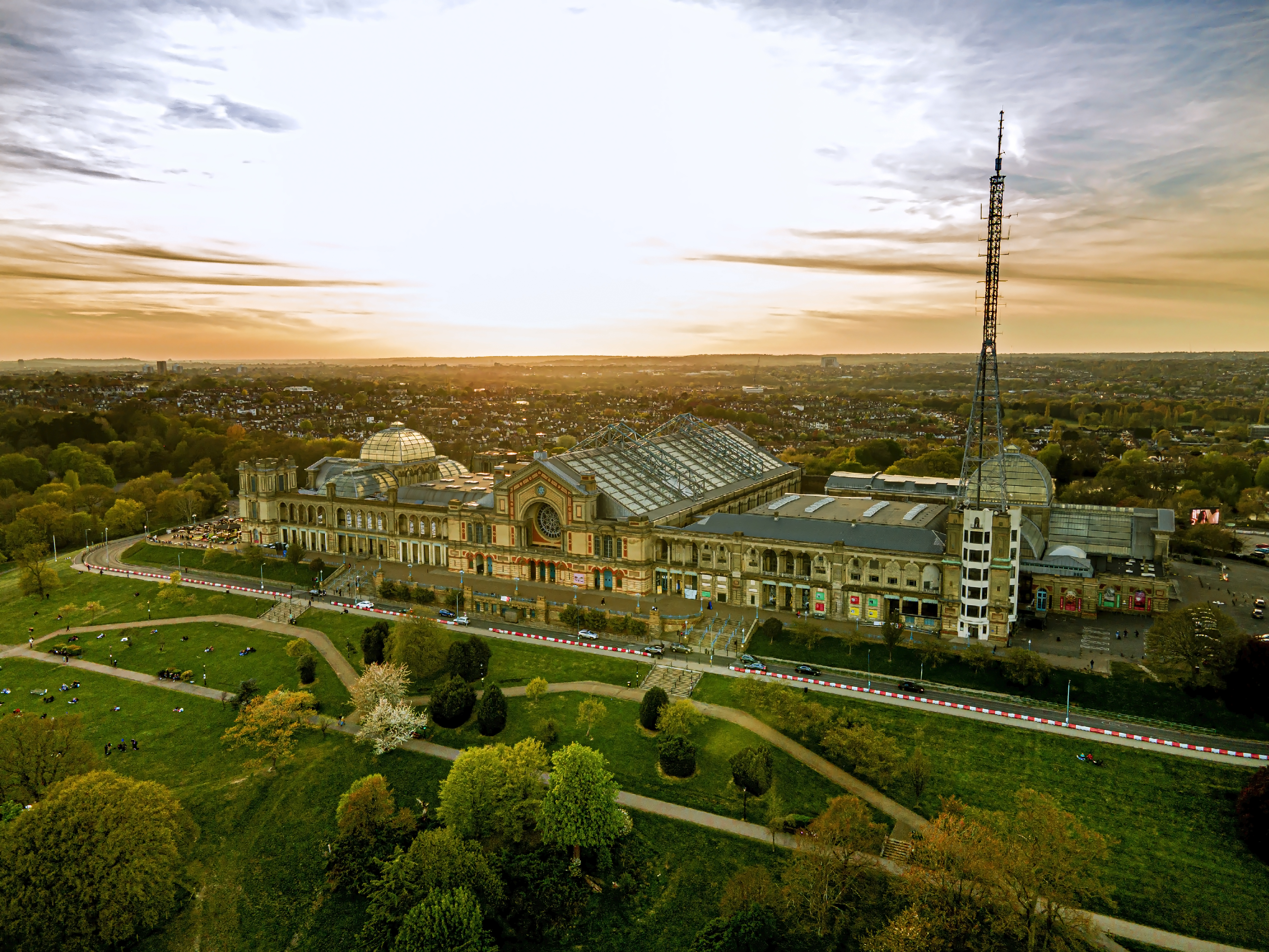
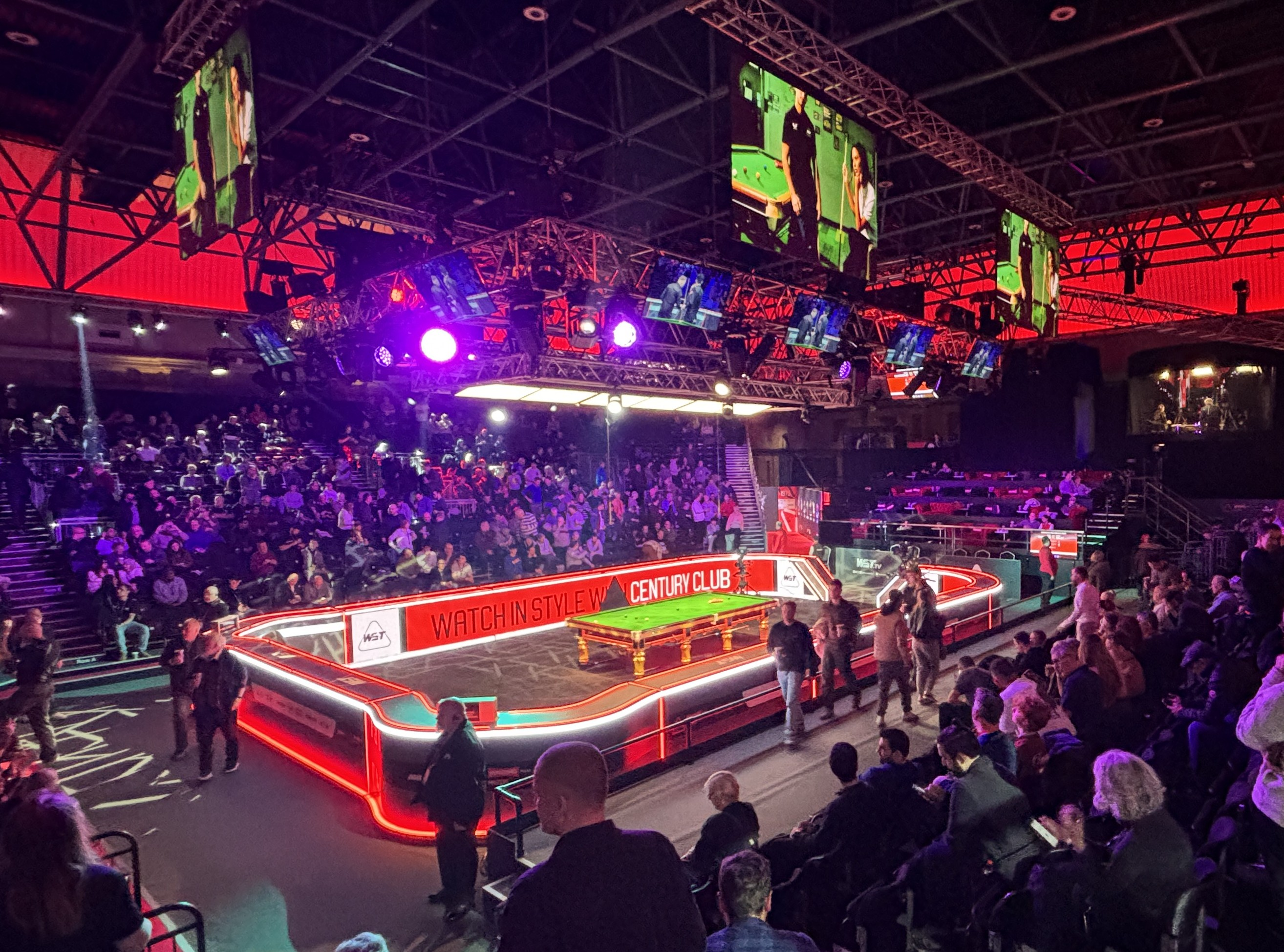
The event was held at Alexandra Palace in London, shown here from outside and during the event.

The Masters was first held in 1975 for 10 invited players at the West Centre Hotel in London. John Spencer won the inaugural event, defeating Ray Reardon on a re-spotted black in the deciding frame of the final. The second-oldest professional snooker tournament, after the World Championship, the Masters has been staged at Alexandra Palace since 2012. In 2016, the Masters trophy was renamed the Paul Hunter Trophy to honour the late three-time champion, who won the title in 2001, 2002, and 2004 before dying of cancer in 2006, aged 27. As of 2026, Ronnie O'Sullivan was the most successful player in the tournament's history, having won the title eight times. He was both the youngest and oldest Masters champion, having won his first title in 1995, aged 19, and his eighth title in 2024, aged 48.

The 2026 edition of the tournament—the 52nd consecutive staging since its inaugural edition in 1975—took place from 11 to 18 January at Alexandra Palace in London, England. It was the second Triple Crown event of the 2025–26 snooker season, following the 2025 UK Championship and preceding the 2026 World Championship. Shaun Murphy was the defending champion, having defeated Kyren Wilson 10–7 in the 2025 final to win his second Masters title.

=== Format and participants ===
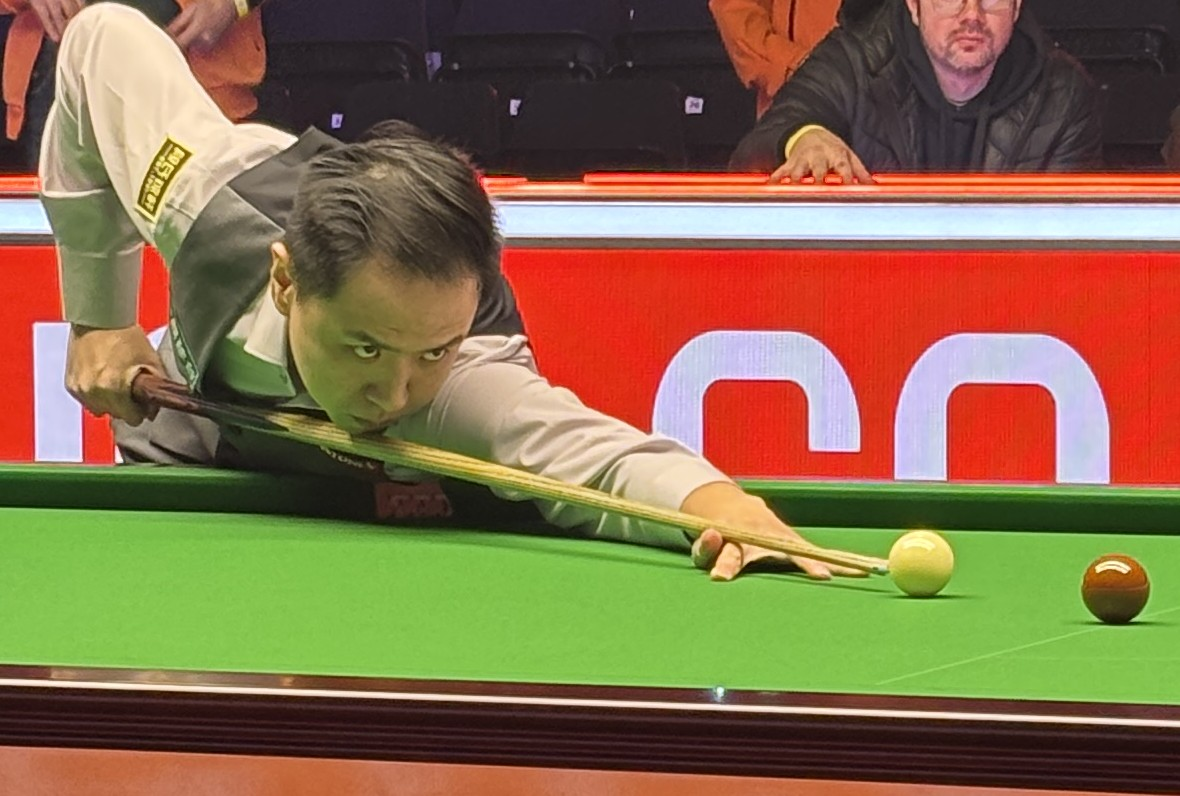
Xiao Guodong (pictured at the event) made his Masters debut as one of a record five participants from mainland China.

The top 16 players in the snooker world rankings, as they stood after the 2025 UK Championship, were invited to participate. The first-round draw took place during the final of the UK Championship, where the top eight seeds were drawn at random against players seeded 9 through 16. On 9 January, O'Sullivan withdrew for medical reasons and was replaced in the draw by Chris Wakelin, who had been 17th in the world rankings after the UK Championship. It was the second consecutive year O'Sullivan did not participate, having also withdrawn from the 2025 event.

Wu Yize and Xiao Guodong made their Masters debuts at the tournament, where they joined Ding Junhui, Si Jiahui, and the reigning World Champion Zhao Xintong to make a record total of five players from mainland China. John Higgins made his record-extending 32nd Masters appearance, having featured in the tournament every year since the 1995 edition.

All matches were played as the best of 11 frames until the final, which was the best of 19 frames, held over two sessions.

=== Broadcasters and viewership ===
The tournament was broadcast in the United Kingdom by the BBC and in the UK and Ireland by TNT Sports and Discovery+. It was broadcast in mainland Europe by Eurosport, with streaming coverage on Discovery+ in Germany, Italy, and Austria and on HBO Max in other European territories. It was broadcast in mainland China by CCTV-5, Huya Live, Migu, the CBSA‑WPBSA Academy WeChat Channel, and the CBSA‑WPBSA Academy Douyin. It was broadcast in Hong Kong by Now TV, in Thailand by TrueSports, in Taiwan by Sportcast, in Mongolia by N Sports, in the Philippines by TAP Sports, and in Malaysia and Brunei by Astro SuperSport. In territories where no other coverage was available, the tournament was streamed by WST Play.

For the first three days of the tournament, some viewers, including competitor Mark Williams, reported that the table appeared on their screens as square rather than rectangular. At the beginning of the 14 January afternoon session, BBC commentator John Virgo confirmed that adjustments had been made to the camera angles used for filming. The tournament attracted a peak audience of 2.1 million for the final on the BBC, an increase of 2 percent over the peak audience for the previous year's final. Total domestic viewer hours over the entire tournament were 50.4 million across the BBC and TNT Sports combined, an increase over the 43 million recorded the previous year. The 4.65 million streams recorded on BBC iPlayer represented a 22 percent increase over the previous year's figure.

=== Prize fund ===
The breakdown of prize money for the event is shown below. In addition, during the 2025–26 season, a player who made two maximum breaks across the four qualifying events—the 2025 Saudi Arabia Snooker Masters, the 2025 UK Championship (including qualifiers), the 2026 Masters, and the 2026 World Championship (including qualifiers)—won a bonus of £147,000. O'Sullivan had claimed the bonus earlier in the season by making two 147s at the Saudi Arabia Masters, but it could be won up to two more times, including multiple times by the same player.

- Winner: £350,000
- Runner-up: £140,000
- Semi-finals: £75,000
- Quarter-finals: £40,000
- Last 16: £25,000
- Highest break: £15,000
- Total: £1,015,000

== Summary ==
=== First round ===
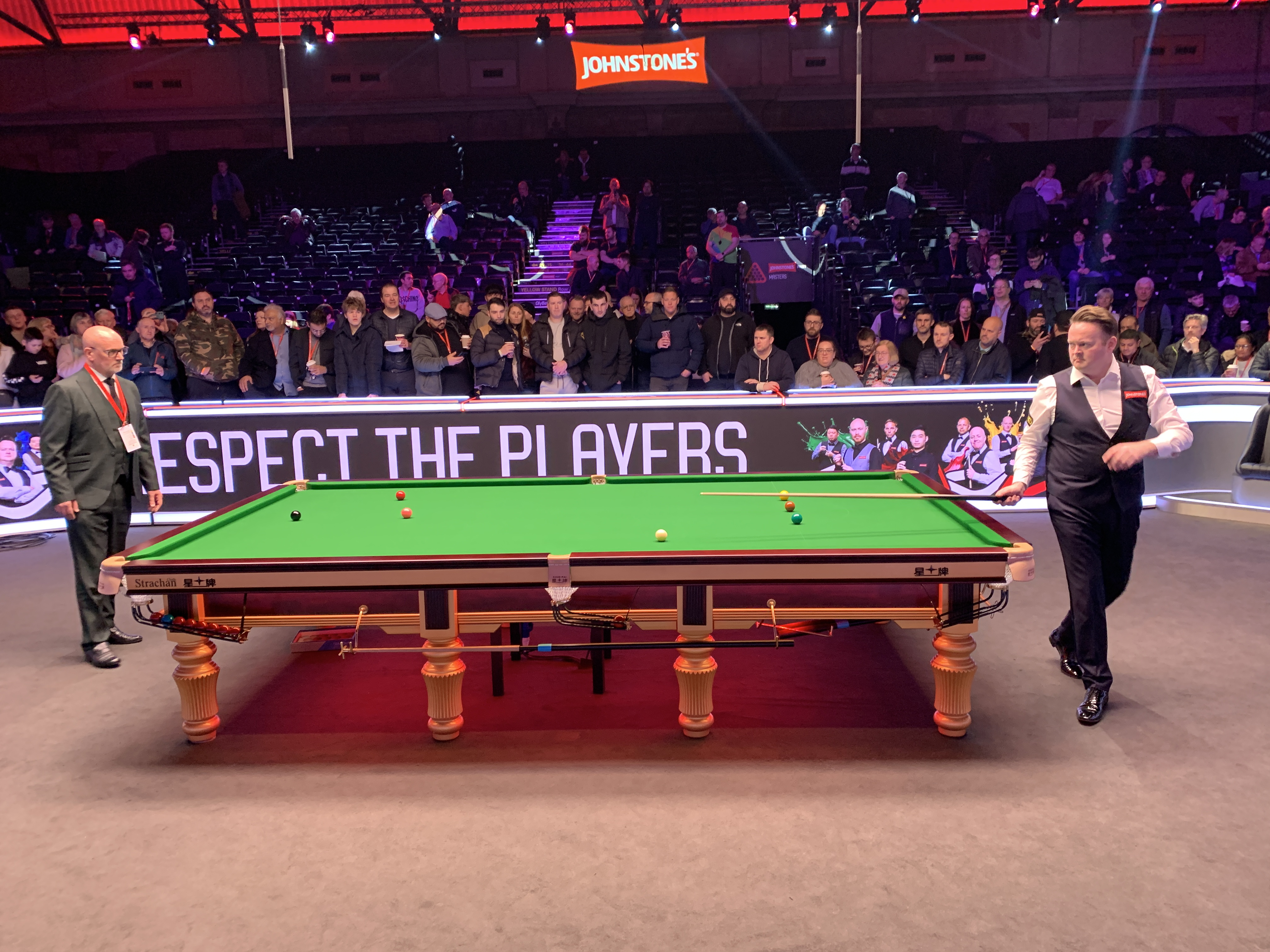
The defending champion Shaun Murphy (pictured right at the previous year's event) lost 2–6 in the first round to debutant Wu Yize.

The first-round matches were played from 11 to 14 January. Facing the defending champion Shaun Murphy, tournament debutant Wu Yize won the first three frames, making a century break of 137 in frame two. Murphy took frame four, but Wu won frame five on the last black to lead 4–1. Murphy won frame six, but Wu took the last two frames for a 6–2 win, his first victory over Murphy. "After the first frame, I felt a bit more relaxed and I totally enjoyed the atmosphere," Wu said afterwards. Murphy, who made a highest break of just 49, said: "I'm very disappointed. I've been working very hard [...] so I didn't expect to play like that and I'm as shocked as anyone." The eighth seed Mark Selby faced the other tournament debutant, Xiao Guodong, who made breaks of 95, 62, 76, and 77 as he won the first four frames. Selby produced breaks of 101 and 76 to win frames five and six, but Xiao took frame seven with a century of 118 after Selby missed a blue to a centre pocket. Xiao secured a 6–2 victory in frame eight after Selby missed a yellow along the baulk cushion. "In the first four frames I put [Selby] under pressure and didn't miss many balls," said Xiao afterwards. "But I knew he would come back. The seventh frame was very important and when he missed the blue I made a century. At 4–3 it would have been very different." Selby commented: "If I had won [frame seven] I would have fancied winning the match because I had the momentum. But Xiao did what he did all night, punished my mistakes." The victories by Wu and Xiao marked the first time since the 2009 event that two Masters debutants had won their opening matches.

The sixth seed Mark Williams faced Mark Allen, who had been ill with food poisoning for a week before the tournament. Allen took the opening frame with a 67 break, but Williams won the next two. Allen then produced breaks including 54, 60, 125, and 70 as he won five consecutive frames for a 6–2 victory, beating Williams at the event for the first time and reaching his 11th Masters quarter-final. "I couldn't prepare for this at all as I've been lying in bed all week with food poisoning, so I just thought 'go out there and give my best'. I wouldn't have had much left if it had got much closer," Allen said afterwards. Williams, who made a highest break of just 36, said afterwards that he had "made it easy" for Allen, commenting: "I was pretty poor. It can happen and will happen more. I tried, even though it didn't look like it." Zhao Xintong, the reigning World Champion, made his second Masters appearance, having previously featured at the 2022 event. He faced Gary Wilson, who made a 76 break to win the opening frame. Zhao won four consecutive frames, making breaks of 50, 51, 54, and 72. Wilson won frame six, but Zhao took the next two for a 6–2 victory, his first win at the Masters. "I really enjoyed tonight," Zhao said afterwards. "I heard lot of Chinese fans and I got more confidence from their support." Wilson, who had lost in the first round in all three of his Masters appearances, said he had been "cueing like a bad amateur" and commented: "You go out there wanting to put on some kind of performance and I am just nowhere near the player I should be."

Kyren Wilson, the fourth seed and previous year's runner-up, faced Si Jiahui. Wilson's old cue had been damaged the previous summer, and he subsequently auctioned it for £5,250 to benefit a children's cancer charity. Unable to find a suitable replacement, he had described himself as "close to a mental breakdown" after losing in the first round of the UK Championship; he then acquired a new cue before the 2025 Scottish Open and practiced with it in the lead-up to the Masters. After winning the opening frame, Wilson attempted a maximum break in frame two but missed the 11th red, ending the break on 80. Si took frame three with a 97 break and had an opportunity to win frame four from 53 points behind, but Wilson secured the frame after Si missed a black, moving into a 3–1 lead at the mid-session interval. Si won the 34-minute fifth frame after laying a snooker on the last yellow, but Wilson then produced breaks of 59, 101, and 105 to win three consecutive frames, completing a 6–2 victory and reaching his sixth Masters quarter-final. "I felt really strong out there," Wilson said afterwards. "When you can go out and trust your cue and just play the game, it makes my job an awful lot easier. At 3–2, Si was looking dangerous. He has great technique, so it was important to win the next frame."

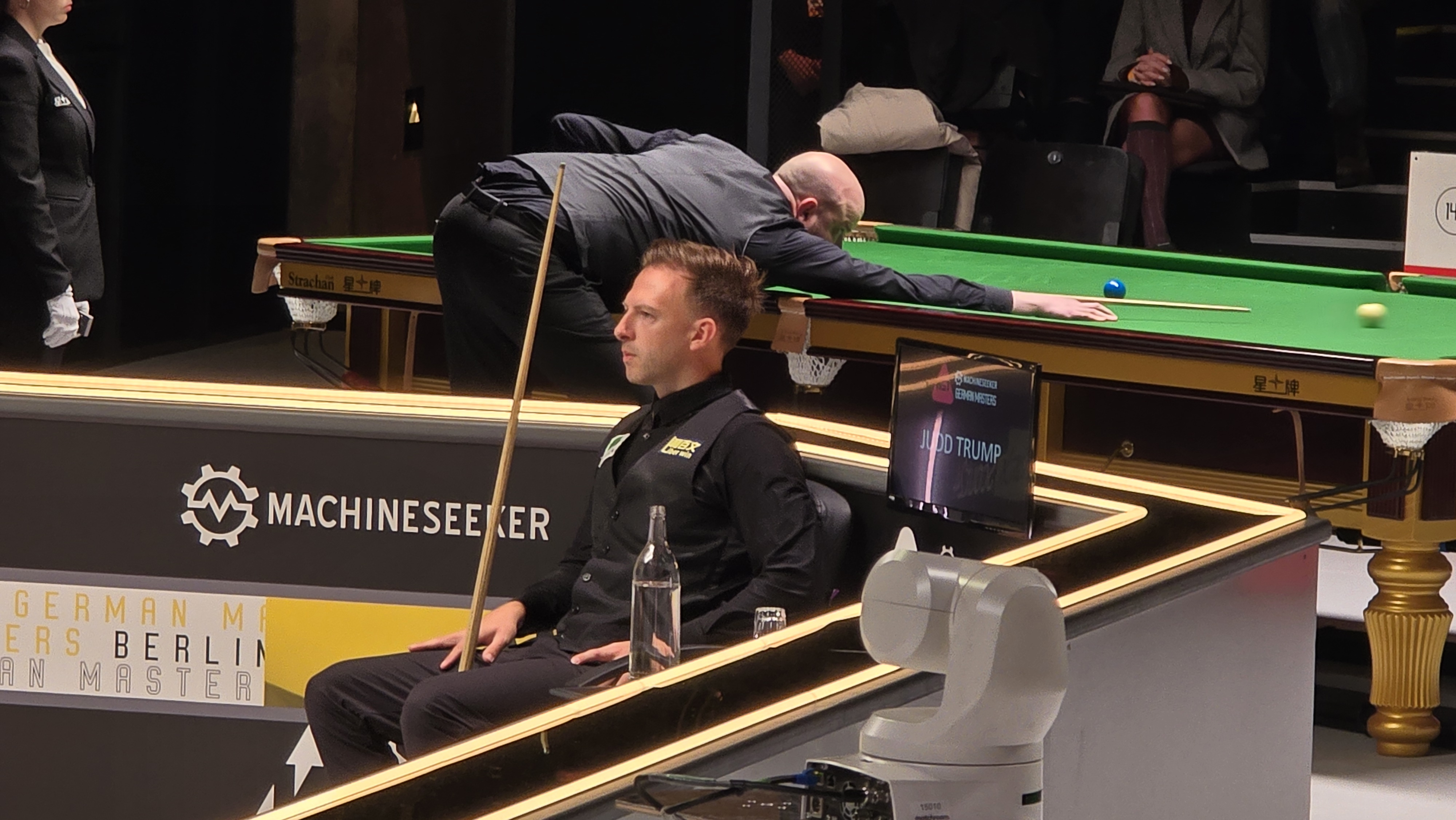
The world number one Judd Trump (pictured in 2026) made back-to-back century breaks in his 6–2 victory over Ding Junhui. All first-round matches produced 6–2 scorelines.

The seventh seed John Higgins, making his record-extending 32nd Masters appearance, faced Barry Hawkins, who won the opening frame with a 58 break. Higgins won the next three frames to lead 3–1 at the mid-session interval. Hawkins took frame five with a break of 64, but Higgins then won another three consecutive frames, making breaks of 99, 58, and 61 as he secured a 6–2 victory. "I was delighted with the way I hit the ball tonight," said Higgins afterwards. "Even at the start, I felt good in myself. [Hawkins] didn't play as well as he can, but I'm delighted to beat someone as good as him." Hawkins, who went almost an hour in the match without potting a ball, commented: "[Higgins] played brilliantly. I missed a black in the third frame and he cleared up. From then on he never looked back and played so strong." The world number one Judd Trump won the first three frames against Ding Junhui, making a century of 116 in frame two. Ding won frame four with a 98 break to leave Trump leading 3–1 at the mid-session interval. Ding recovered from 54 points behind to win frame five but did not pot a ball in the remaining three frames as Trump produced a break of 88 followed by back-to-back centuries of 117 and 109 to secure a 6–2 victory. It was Trump's fifth consecutive win against Ding. "It was a good performance," said Trump afterwards. "I started well, then Ding was back in it at 3–2, so I was happy to find some momentum and make good breaks." Ding commented: "I played a few terrible safety shots and let him have chances. He was playing well and I wasn't at a good enough level to play against him."

The fifth seed Neil Robertson faced Chris Wakelin, who had replaced Ronnie O'Sullivan in the draw following the latter's withdrawal. Robertson won the opening frame with breaks of 40 and 44. In the second frame, Robertson recovered from 71 points behind to trail by 17 points with three balls remaining, but Wakelin won the frame after Robertson fouled the blue. Robertson won frame three with a 53 break, but Wakelin made a century of 101 to tie the scores at 2–2. After the mid-session interval, Robertson made century breaks of 116, 135, and 102 as he won four consecutive frames for a 6–2 victory. "At 2–2 I hadn't done much wrong, then after the interval I got on a roll," said Robertson after the match. Wakelin commented: "I felt really good at 2–2, then Neil came out and made back to back centuries, and I felt like I melted out there." All first-round matches ended in 6–2 scorelines, the odds of which were estimated at 220,000 to 1. No more than four first-round matches had produced a score of 6–2 at any previous edition of the tournament. Commentating for the BBC, Stephen Hendry remarked: "It is phenomenal. You would normally have at least three 6–5 scores because of the nature of the tournament."

=== Quarter-finals ===
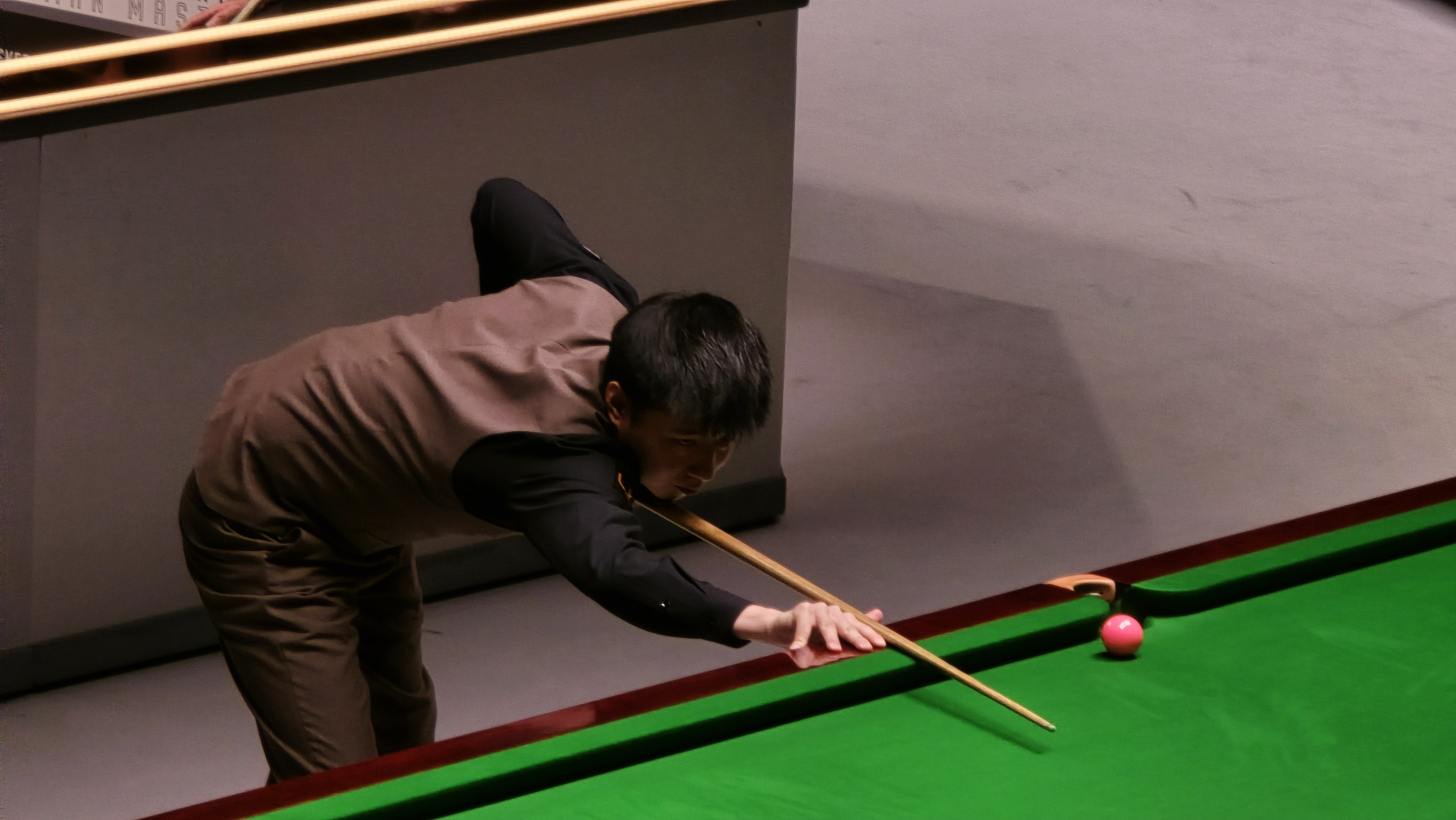
The reigning World Champion Zhao Xintong (pictured in 2026) reached the Masters quarter-finals for the first time but lost to John Higgins on the last black of a deciding frame.

The quarter-finals were played on 15 and 16 January. In the first quarter-final, Higgins faced Zhao, who won the opening frame with a break of 89. Higgins won frame two with a century of 114. The scores were tied again at 2–2 and 3–3. In frame seven, Zhao snookered Higgins on the last red and won the frame for a 4–3 lead. In frame eight, Higgins missed the black to a top corner pocket after potting the last red, and Zhao won the frame to go 5–3 ahead. Higgins won frame nine and then fluked a red in frame ten while attempting a plant; he went on to make a 58 break, tying the scores at 5–5. Zhao led in the deciding frame but missed the last red, and Higgins produced a 31 clearance to win the match on the last black. Higgins reached the last four for the first time since 2021 and, at age 50, became the oldest Masters semi-finalist since Eddie Charlton in 1983. "It's an incredible feeling," said Higgins afterwards. "I was really lucky from 5–3 to 5–5 because I missed a few balls and got away with it."

Trump faced Allen, who recovered from 54 points behind to win the opening frame with a 69 clearance. Trump took frame two and also won the 48-minute third frame after a lengthy safety battle on the last blue. Allen made a 76 break in frame four to tie the scores at 2–2 at the mid-session interval. In frame five, Allen missed a frame ball red, and Trump, whose highest break to that point in the match was 35, responded with a frame-winning clearance of 50. Trump then took frame six with a 70 break and also won frame seven to lead 5–2. He made a 68 break in frame eight to secure a 6–2 win, reaching his eighth Masters semi-final. "It was a hard game," Trump said afterwards. "Sometimes against [Allen] it goes a bit scrappy. That was probably the worst I have played for a while so it's pleasing to get the win." Allen commented: "Missing the red in the fifth frame turned the match. I was disappointed to be 2–2 at the interval because I felt I should have been 3–1 up. [Trump] made a great clearance to go 3–2 up because before that he looked all at sea with his positional play. That break settled him down and after that he got very strong as the match went on."

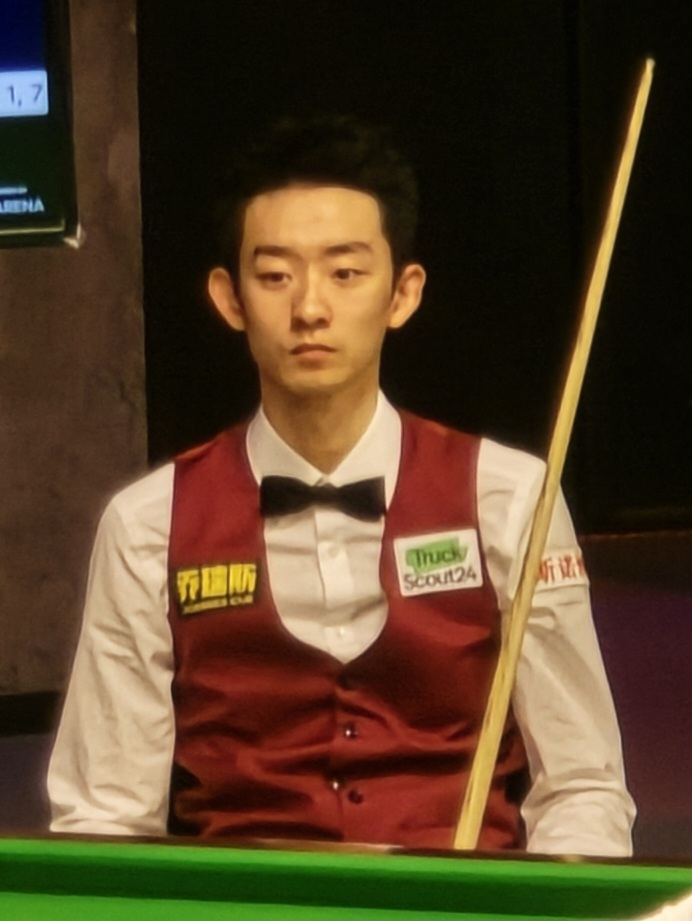
Wu Yize (pictured in 2025) whitewashed Xiao Guodong in the quarter-finals, becoming the first player since 2021 to reach the semi-finals on his debut.

The match between Wu and Xiao was the first time either player had contested a Triple Crown quarter-final. Wu won the first two frames with breaks of 112 and 93, took frame three after Xiao missed a long pot on the penultimate red, and then breaks of 54 and 60 in frame four to lead 4–0 at the interval. When play resumed, Wu made breaks of 84 and 97 to complete a whitewash victory. He became the first Masters debutant to reach the last four of the tournament since Yan Bingtao at the 2021 event. "I played well today and didn’t really give him many chances," said Wu afterwards. "We're very good friends off the table, but once we're in a match, we both give it everything. I potted some key long shots, and defensively I was strong. I tried to enjoy being out there and not put any pressure on myself."

In the last quarter-final, Robertson played Wilson, who won the first three frames with breaks of 110, 59, and 105. In frame four, Robertson called a foul on himself after accidentally touching the brown with his hand; later in the frame, he tried to play a roll-up snooker and committed another foul when he failed to hit the yellow. However, Wilson missed pots on the last pink and black, and Robertson won the frame on the black to leave Wilson 3–1 ahead at the mid-session interval. When play resumed, Wilson extended his lead to 4–1 with a 66 break in frame five, but Robertson won frame six and then made back-to-back centuries of 110 and 107 to tie the scores at 4–4. In frame nine, Wilson missed the black off its spot, and Robertson made a 65 break to win a fourth consecutive frame for a 5–4 lead. In frame ten, Robertson ran out of position and played a safety shot; Wilson potted a long red and went on to compile a break of 111, the fifth century of the match, to tie the scores at 5–5. In the decider, both players had scoring opportunities before Wilson made a 42 break to leave Robertson requiring snookers, which he was unable to obtain. "It was a fantastic game and I am glad it lived up to its billing," Wilson said after his win. "I made a really good clearance for 5–5 and just dug it out. It was one where, win or lose, you are thinking there is plenty to build on for the rest of the season." Robertson's two centuries in the match brought his overall Masters total to 48, surpassing the 46 made by Hendry. Only O'Sullivan had recorded more centuries in the history of the event, with 86. Robertson commented: "It was a brilliant match. I got something going from 4–1 down. At 5–4, I was a millimetre away from being in position. It's fine margins."

=== Semi-finals ===
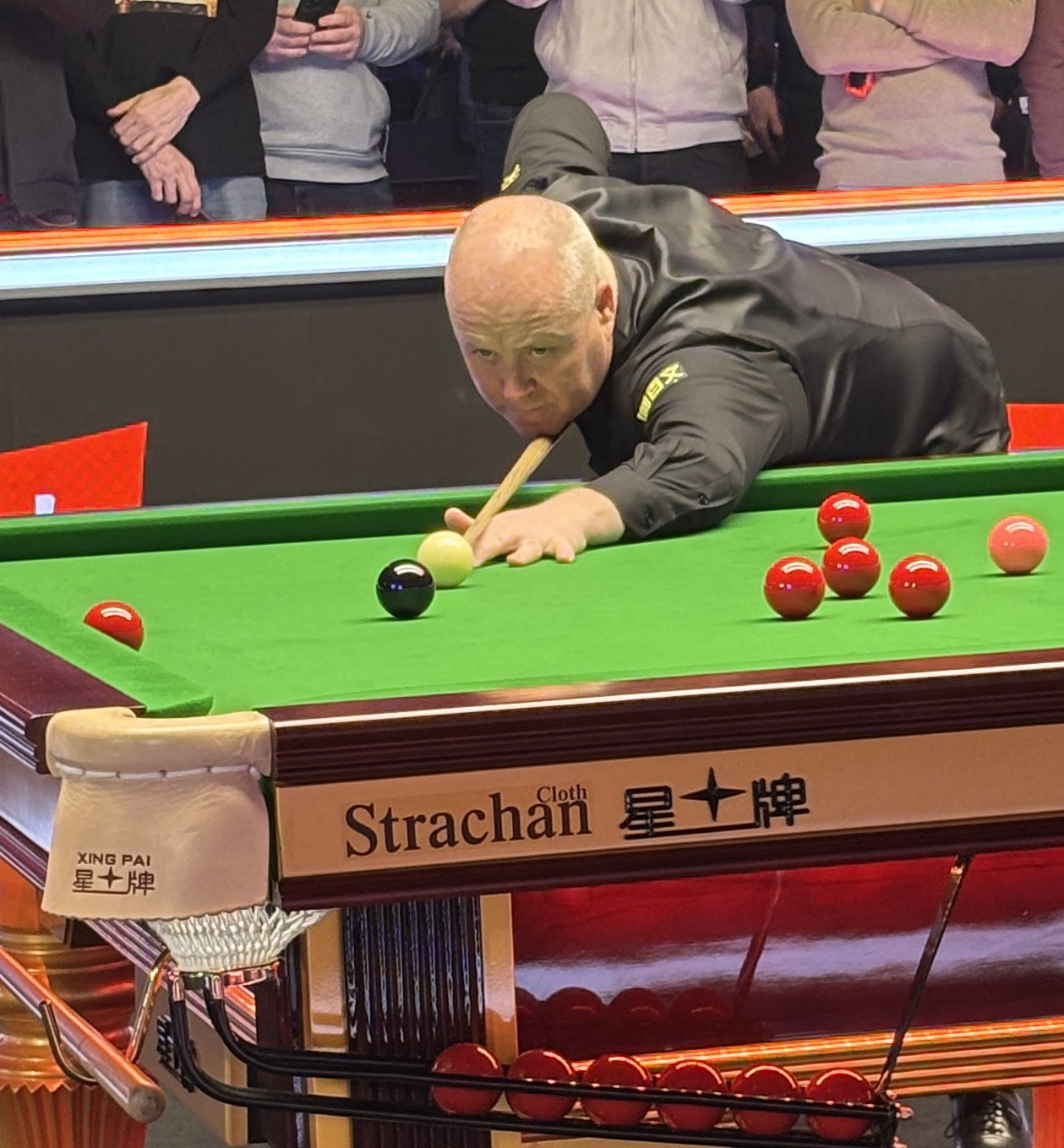
John Higgins (pictured at the event) made a record-extending 32nd Masters appearance. He reached a sixth Masters final and became the oldest Triple Crown finalist, aged 50 years and 245 days.

The semi-finals were played on 17 January. In the first semi-final, Higgins faced Trump, who had won the previous seven matches between the two players. Trump won the first three frames and led 3–1 at the mid-session interval. Higgins took frame five with a century of 104 but missed a red while on a break of 44 in frame six, and Trump produced a 70 clearance to lead 4–2. Trump led by 54 points in frame seven when he fouled the blue while potting a red, and Higgins made a frame-winning clearance. In frame eight, Higgins missed frame ball, a red to a corner pocket, and Trump cleared to lead 5–3. Trump had a match-winning opportunity in frame nine, but Higgins secured the frame after Trump missed the last brown. Higgins made a 70 break in frame ten. Trump got the three snookers he required, but Higgins won the frame after doubling the last red, tying the scores at 5–5. In the deciding frame, Trump missed a red while playing the shot right-handed. Higgins compiled a 57 break and went on to win the frame and match. "It was amazing, I can't believe I am through," said Higgins afterwards. "It has to go down as one of my biggest ever wins because [Trump] is such a great champion and he had won so many matches against me in the last few years. He probably felt the match was easy. At 3–0 perhaps he took his foot off the pedal, and this game never forgives you." Trump commented: "I had my chances and I should have got over the line so I am disappointed. I just need to improve under pressure a bit and then I'll be able to turn these things around. I have lost a lot of deciding frames this season. But [Higgins] is a great player and took his chance."

In the second semi-final, Wilson faced Wu, who won the opening frame with a 75 break. Wu had a chance to win frame two from 51 points behind, but Wilson tied the scores after Wu missed a red. Wilson won the third frame on the last pink, but Wu produced a break of 69 in frame four to tie the scores again at 2–2 at the mid-session interval. Wilson won frames five and six with breaks of 76 and 74, but Wu responded with breaks of 74, 87, and 58 to win three consecutive frames for a 5–4 lead. Wu had a match-winning opportunity in frame ten when he led by 33 points, but he missed a red to a corner pocket, and Wilson took the frame with a 46 clearance. Wilson then compiled a century of 116 to win the deciding frame. "Wu Yize is going to be around for many years to come," said Wilson afterwards. "I wasn't at the races at all. I don't know where I found those final two frames." Wu commented: "Neither of us played particularly well early in the match, then at 4–2 I played two or three good frames. That ball which could have finished the match 6–4, I don't know why I missed it [but] I don't think this loss proves anything, and I'll continue to move forward."

=== Final ===
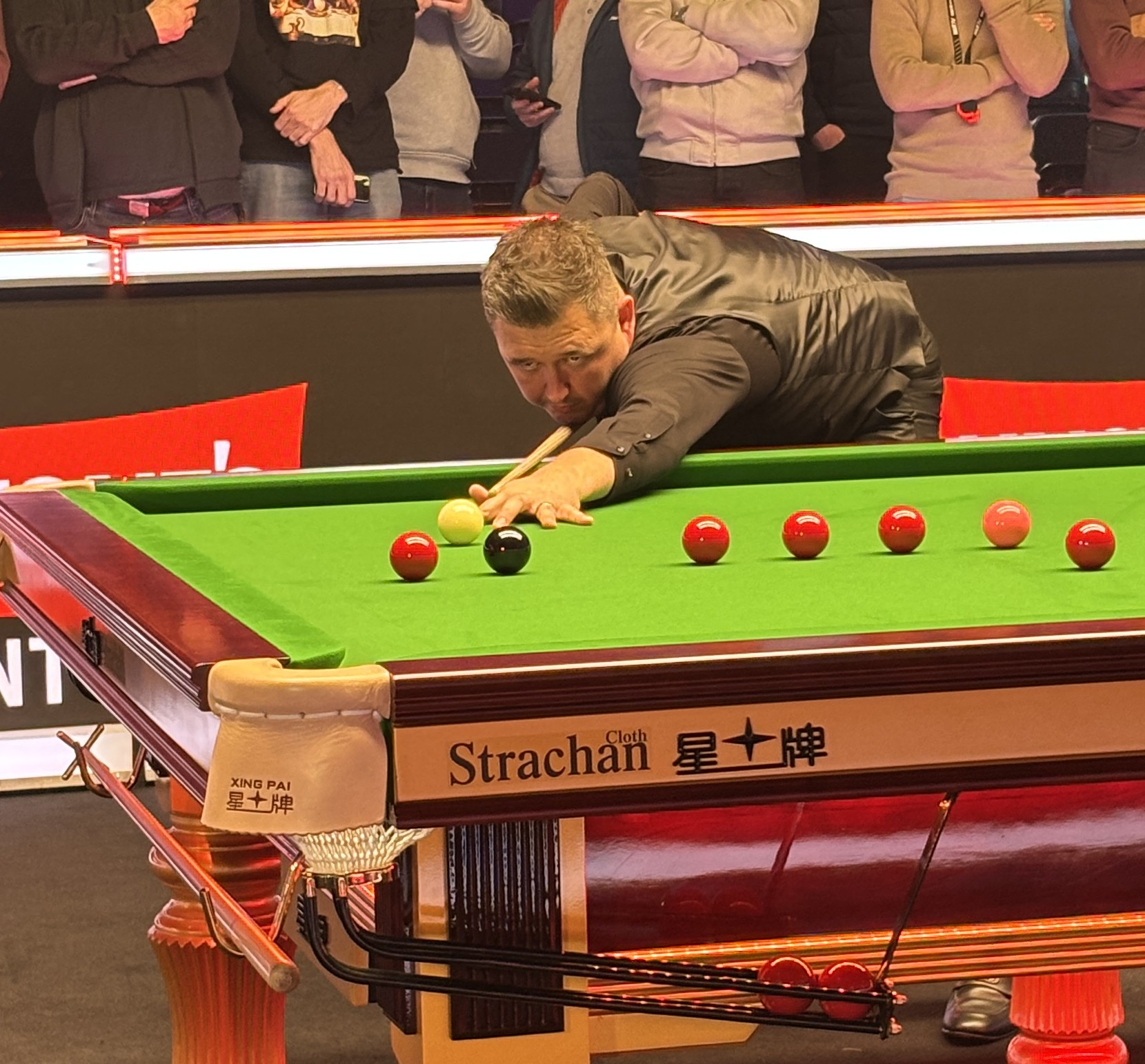
Kyren Wilson (pictured at the event) played in his third Masters final. He defeated John Higgins 10–6 to win his first Masters title and second Triple Crown title.

The final took place on 18 January as the best of 19 frames, played over two sessions, between the fourth seed Kyren Wilson and the seventh seed John Higgins. Wilson was competing in his third Masters final, having previously been runner-up in 2018 and 2025. He was the first player since O'Sullivan in 2016 and 2017 to reach back-to-back Masters finals. Higgins played in his sixth Masters final, having won the title in 1999 and 2006 and been runner-up in 1995, 2005, and 2021. At the age of 50 years and 245 days, he became the oldest finalist in any Triple Crown tournament, surpassing Ray Reardon, who had been 50 years and 114 days old when he played in the 1983 Masters final. Higgins became the first player to contest Masters finals in his teens, 20s, 30s, 40s, and 50s. It was the first time the two players had met at the Masters or in any tournament final. Tatiana Woollaston refereed her first Masters final. The final was the last match to feature televised commentary by John Virgo, who died 17 days later, on 4 February, at age 79.

Higgins won the opening frame with a 58 break. He made another half-century in frame two, but Wilson took the frame with a 58 clearance after Higgins missed two pots with the rest. Wilson also won frame three. Higgins was on a 58 break in frame four when he missed a red, and Wilson cleared again for a 3–1 lead at the mid-session interval. Higgins won the 38-minute fifth frame and came from behind to take the sixth, tying the scores at 3–3. Wilson then produced back-to-back centuries of 103 and 111 to end the afternoon session with a 5–3 lead. Wilson's 103 in frame seven was the 750th century break in Masters history.

When play resumed for the second session, Higgins made a break of 71 to win frame nine, but Wilson took frame ten after Higgins missed a double on the penultimate red, moving 6–4 ahead. In the 11th frame, Higgins was leading by 46 points when he missed the black. Wilson got the snooker he required and attempted a clearance but missed the last pink, leading to a safety exchange; Higgins secured the frame after Wilson went in in-off. Wilson won the 12th frame to lead 7–5 at the mid-session interval. In frame 13, Higgins made a safety error on the last brown, and Wilson took a three-frame lead for the first time at 8–5. Wilson made a 78 break in frame 14 to move one frame from victory at 9–5. He had a match-winning opportunity in frame 15 but missed the black off its spot, and Higgins took the frame with a 70 break. In frame 16, Wilson took a 32-point lead and made a further break of 24 to win the match 10–6, securing his first Masters title. It was Wilson's second Triple Crown title, following his win at the 2024 World Championship.

"In 2018 when I lost in the final I cried like a little girl, and I am trying not to cry now because it means so much to me," said Wilson after the match. "[Higgins] is an idol of mine. It was a dog fight from the start today and I just tried to be as dogged as [Higgins] has been over the years. [...] I will be proud of this win for the rest of my life." Higgins, whom BBC Sport journalist Steve Sutcliffe described as "visibly weakening" and making "uncharacteristic mistakes" as the match progressed, commented afterwards: "The crowd were fantastic and so were the conditions, but I was useless. [Wilson] was by far the better player. He was totally dominant. The scoreline is 10–6 but it wasn't as close as that. It's disappointing because the last two Masters finals I have played in, I haven't kept the same form which got me to the final."

== Tournament draw ==
The draw of the tournament is shown below. Numbers in parentheses after the players' names denote the players' seedings, and players in bold denote match winners.

**First round** Best of 11 frames
Shaun Murphy (ENG) (1) | 2
**Wu Yize (CHN) (13)** | **6**
Mark Selby (ENG) (8) | 2
**Xiao Guodong (CHN) (11)** | **6**
**Neil Robertson (AUS) (5)** | **6**
Chris Wakelin (ENG) | 2
**Kyren Wilson (ENG) (4)** | **6**
Si Jiahui (CHN) (15) | 2
**Judd Trump (ENG) (3)** | **6**
Ding Junhui (CHN) (12) | 2
Mark Williams (WAL) (6) | 2
**Mark Allen (NIR) (10)** | **6**
**John Higgins (SCO) (7)** | **6**
Barry Hawkins (ENG) (14) | 2
**Zhao Xintong (CHN) (2)** | **6**
Gary Wilson (ENG) (16) | 2

**Quarter-finals**; Best of 11 frames
**(China) Wu Yize (13)** | **6**
(China) Xiao Guodong (11) | 0
(Australia) Neil Robertson (5) | 5
**(England) Kyren Wilson (4)** | **6**
**(England) Judd Trump (3)** | **6**
(Northern Ireland) Mark Allen (10) | 2
**(Scotland) John Higgins (7)** | **6**
(China) Zhao Xintong (2) | 5

**Semi-finals**; Best of 11 frames
(China) Wu Yize (13) | 5
**(England) Kyren Wilson (4)** | **6**
(England) Judd Trump (3) | 5
**(Scotland) John Higgins (7)** | **6**

**Final**; Best of 19 frames
**(England) Kyren Wilson (4)** | **10**
(Scotland) John Higgins (7) | 6

=== Final: frame scores ===
Final: Best of 19 frames. Referee: Tatiana Woollaston; Alexandra Palace, London, England, 18 January 2026
| **Kyren Wilson** (4); England | **10**–6 | John Higgins (7); Scotland |
Afternoon: 0–**80**, **68**–63, **75**–1, **75**–58, 15–**66**, 37–**61**, **103**–0 (103), **111**–0 (111); Evening: 22–**75**, **81**–36, 56–**73**, **67**–15, **52**–40, **78**–7, 17–**70**, **68**–12
| (frame 8) **111** | Highest break | 71 (frame 9) |
| **2** | Century breaks | 0 |

== Century breaks ==
A total of 24 century breaks were made during the tournament.

- 137, 112 – Wu Yize
- 135, 116, 110, 107, 102 – Neil Robertson
- 125 – Mark Allen
- 118 – Xiao Guodong
- 117, 116, 109 – Judd Trump
- 116, 111, 111, 110, 105, 105, 103, 101 – Kyren Wilson
- 114, 104 – John Higgins
- 101 – Mark Selby
- 101 – Chris Wakelin
