= 2026 World Women's Snooker Championship =

Women's snooker tournament

2026 Liber Win Nanjiang World Women's Snooker Championship

Tournament information
- Dates: 12–19 May 2026
- Venue: Changping Snooker Center
- City: Dongguan
- Country: China
- Organisation: World Women's Snooker; CBSA
- Total prize fund: £42,000
- Winner's share: £13,000
- Highest break: Panchaya Channoi (THA) (107)

Final
- Champion: Panchaya Channoi (THA)
- Runner-up: Reanne Evans (ENG)
- Score: 6–2

The 2026 World Women's Snooker Championship (officially the 2026 Liber Win Nanjiang World Women's Snooker Championship) was a women's snooker tournament that took place from 12 to 19 May 2026 at Changping Snooker Center in Dongguan, China. The tournament was organised by World Women's Snooker in conjunction with the Chinese Billiard Sports Association (CBSA) and Cantonese Snooker (Changping). The winner received £13,000 from a total prize pool of £42,000, as well as a two-year professional tour card from the start of the 2026–27 snooker season.

Bai Yulu was the defending champion, having defeated Mink Nutcharut 6–5 in the 2025 final, but she lost 3–4 to Panchaya Channoi in the quarter-finals. Channoi, aged 18, reached her first ranking women's final, where she defeated Reanne Evans 6–2 to claim her first world title. The third Thai player to win the event, after Mink Nutcharut in 2022 and Baipat Siripaporn in 2023, she became the youngest World Women's Champion since 16-year-old Ann-Marie Farren in 1987. Evans lost in the final of the event for the first time, having won all 12 of her previous world finals. The event produced two century breaks, 107 and 100, both made by Channoi in the final. She became the second player, after Evans in 2013, to make two centuries in a women's world final.

The event also included the World Women's Seniors Championship and the World Women's Under-21 Snooker Championship, whose respective defending champions were Tessa Davidson and Channoi. In the seniors event, Davidson lost 1–3 in the semi-finals to Deng Xin Shun, who went on to beat Han Fang 3–2 in the final, winning the deciding frame on the last black ball. In the Under-21 event, Channoi recovered from 0–2 behind to defeat Wang Ruotong 3–2 in the final, retaining the title. She became the second player to hold the world title and world Under-21 title simultaneously, after Bai in 2024.

== Overview ==
=== Background ===
The Women's Professional Snooker Championship was held ten times between 1934 and 1950, with no tournaments staged between 1941 and 1947. Ruth Harrison won eight of those ten events. The Women's World Open, first held in 1976, is recognised as the beginning of the modern World Women's Snooker Championship. Reanne Evans holds the record for the most wins, having won 12 titles, including ten consecutive victories from 2005 to 2014.

=== Prize fund ===
The winner of the event received £13,000 from a total prize fund of £42,000. The winner was also awarded the Mandy Fisher trophy and a two-year card for the professional World Snooker Tour. The breakdown of prize money is shown below:

- Winner: £13,000
- Runner-up: £6,500
- Semi-finalists: £3,000
- Quarter-finalists: £1,500
- Last 16: £1,000
- Total: £42,000

== Results ==
=== Main event ===
==== Group stage ====
Group standings are shown below.

Group A

Pos.	Player	MP	MW	ML	FW	FL	Diff.	Qualification
1	Narucha Phoemphul (THA)	4	4	0	12	2	10	Progressed to knockout stage
2	Qingning Huang (CHN)	4	3	1	11	5	6	Progressed to knockout stage
3	Chu Pui Ying (HKG)	4	2	2	8	6	2	Eliminated
4	Otgontuya Batnasan (MNG)	4	1	3	3	10	-7	Eliminated
5	Jinhua He (HKG)	4	0	4	1	12	-11	Eliminated

Group B

Pos.	Player	MP	MW	ML	FW	FL	Diff.	Qualification
1	Reanne Evans (ENG)	4	4	0	12	0	12	Progressed to knockout stage
2	Lu Zhao (CHN)	4	3	1	9	4	5	Progressed to knockout stage
3	Keerthana Pandian (IND)	4	2	2	6	6	0	Eliminated
4	Starry Lap Yin Chan (HKG)	4	1	3	4	9	-5	Eliminated
5	Xuanye Zhu (CHN)	4	0	4	0	12	-12	Eliminated

Group C

Pos.	Player	MP	MW	ML	FW	FL	Diff.	Qualification
1	Man Yan So (HKG)	3	3	0	9	1	8	Progressed to knockout stage
2	Sizhe Wang (CHN)	3	2	1	6	4	2	Progressed to knockout stage
3	Xueli Tan (CHN)	3	1	2	3	6	-3	Eliminated
4	Carlie Tait (AUS)	3	0	3	2	9	-7	Eliminated
5	~~Rujin Sha (CHN)~~	0	0	0	0	0	-12	Eliminated

Group D

Pos.	Player	MP	MW	ML	FW	FL	Diff.	Qualification
1	Mink Nutcharut (THA)	4	4	0	12	0	12	Progressed to knockout stage
2	Charlene Chai (SIN)	4	3	1	9	6	3	Progressed to knockout stage
3	Yingfeng Qin (CHN)	4	2	2	7	8	-1	Eliminated
4	Adiyadolgor Chimedvaam (MNG)	4	1	3	5	9	-4	Eliminated
5	Lynn Shi (CHN)	4	0	4	2	12	-12	Eliminated

Group E

Pos.	Player	MP	MW	ML	FW	FL	Diff.	Qualification
1	Panchaya Channoi (THA)	4	4	0	12	0	12	Progressed to knockout stage
2	Katrina Wan (HKG)	4	3	1	9	4	5	Progressed to knockout stage
3	Kaijie Xing (CHN)	4	2	2	6	6	0	Eliminated
4	Bu Tianyi (CHN)	4	1	3	4	10	-6	Eliminated
5	Wan Hei Chen (HKG)	4	0	4	1	12	-11	Eliminated

Group F

Pos.	Player	MP	MW	ML	FW	FL	Diff.	Qualification
1	Yee Ting Cheung (HKG)	4	3	1	10	5	5	Progressed to knockout stage
2	Yang Meng (CHN)	4	3	1	10	5	5	Progressed to knockout stage
3	Ruilan Wu (CHN)	4	3	1	9	6	3	Eliminated
4	Enmiaoer Li (CHN)	4	1	3	8	10	-2	Eliminated
5	Jambaa Sosorbaram (MNG)	4	0	4	1	12	-11	Eliminated

Group G

Pos.	Player	MP	MW	ML	FW	FL	Diff.	Qualification
1	Bai Yulu (CHN)	4	4	0	12	0	12	Progressed to knockout stage
2	He Danni (CHN)	4	3	1	10	4	6	Progressed to knockout stage
3	Zolboo Unurbayar (MNG)	4	1	3	6	10	-4	Eliminated
4	Hong lay Toh (SIN)	4	1	3	4	10	-6	Eliminated
5	Tsz Ying Ho (HKG)	4	1	3	4	11	-7	Eliminated

Group H

Pos.	Player	MP	MW	ML	FW	FL	Diff.	Qualification
1	Phakwalan Kongkaew (THA)	3	3	0	9	3	6	Progressed to knockout stage
2	Yuk Fan Lau (HKG)	3	2	1	7	6	1	Progressed to knockout stage
3	Yitong Wang (CHN)	3	1	2	7	6	1	Eliminated
4	Qiuyue Yu (CHN)	3	0	3	1	9	-8	Eliminated

Group I

Pos.	Player	MP	MW	ML	FW	FL	Diff.	Qualification
1	Narantuya Bayarsaikhan (MNG)	4	4	0	12	2	10	Progressed to knockout stage
2	Han Fang (CHN)	4	3	1	10	3	7	Progressed to knockout stage
3	Yan Tung Choi (HKG)	4	2	2	7	7	0	Eliminated
4	Qinlin Wei (CHN)	4	1	3	4	10	-6	Eliminated
5	Xuemei Qiu (CHN)	4	0	4	1	12	-11	Eliminated

Group J

Pos.	Player	MP	MW	ML	FW	FL	Diff.	Qualification
1	Ng On-yee (HKG)	4	4	0	12	0	12	Progressed to knockout stage
2	Bai Ya Ru (CHN)	4	3	1	9	5	4	Progressed to knockout stage
3	Liu Wei Yi Lu (CHN)	4	2	2	6	6	0	Eliminated
4	Chang Li (CHN)	4	1	3	5	11	-6	Eliminated
5	Ariunaa Baatar (MNG)	4	0	4	2	12	-10	Eliminated

Group K

Pos.	Player	MP	MW	ML	FW	FL	Diff.	Qualification
1	Mei Mei Fong (HKG)	3	3	0	9	3	6	Progressed to knockout stage
2	Jessica Woods (AUS)	3	2	1	8	3	5	Progressed to knockout stage
3	Xiaomin Su (CHN)	3	1	2	4	8	-4	Eliminated
4	Zihan Wang (CHN)	3	0	3	2	9	-7	Eliminated

Group L

Pos.	Player	MP	MW	ML	FW	FL	Diff.	Qualification
1	Deng Xin Shun (CHN)	4	4	0	12	1	11	Progressed to knockout stage
2	Anupama Ramachandran (IND)	4	3	1	10	3	7	Progressed to knockout stage
3	Wing Han Tuen (HKG)	4	2	2	6	6	0	Eliminated
4	Ella O'Connor (IRL)	4	1	3	3	11	-8	Eliminated
5	Shuyi Na (CHN)	4	0	4	2	12	-10	Eliminated

Group M

Pos.	Player	MP	MW	ML	FW	FL	Diff.	Qualification
1	Tessa Davidson (ENG)	3	3	0	9	1	8	Progressed to knockout stage
2	Li Bi Han (CHN)	3	2	1	6	5	1	Progressed to knockout stage
3	Xiaoxiao Jia (CHN)	3	1	2	4	8	-4	Eliminated
4	Diana Schuler (GER)	3	0	3	4	9	-5	Eliminated
5	~~Xi Lin (CHN)~~	0	0	0	0	0	0	Eliminated

Group N

Pos.	Player	MP	MW	ML	FW	FL	Diff.	Qualification
1	Liu Zi Ling (CHN)	4	4	0	12	3	9	Progressed to knockout stage
2	Rebecca Kenna (ENG)	4	3	1	10	6	4	Progressed to knockout stage
3	Zhenmiao Lin (CHN)	4	2	2	7	8	-1	Eliminated
4	Sum Yi Lau (HKG)	4	1	3	6	10	-4	Eliminated
5	Byambasuren Sergelenbaatar (MNG)	4	0	4	4	12	-8	Eliminated

Group O

Pos.	Player	MP	MW	ML	FW	FL	Diff.	Qualification
1	Baipat Siripaporn (THA)	4	3	1	10	4	6	Progressed to knockout stage
2	Muyan Zhang (CHN)	4	3	1	10	6	4	Progressed to knockout stage
3	Wang Ruotong (CHN)	4	2	2	7	7	0	Eliminated
4	Wing man Shiu (HKG)	4	2	2	9	8	1	Eliminated
5	Mo Tian Tian (CHN)	4	0	4	1	12	-11	Eliminated

Group P

Pos.	Player	MP	MW	ML	FW	FL	Diff.	Qualification
1	Chan Wai Lam (HKG)	3	2	1	8	5	3	Progressed to knockout stage
2	Yaqi Yao (CHN)	3	2	1	7	3	4	Progressed to knockout stage
3	Yee Ki Ho (HKG)	3	2	1	6	5	1	Eliminated
4	Weijia Chu (CHN)	3	0	3	1	9	-8	Eliminated

==== Knockout ====
Results from the knockout rounds are shown below. The match winners are shown in bold.

**Last 32**; Best of 5 frames
**Mink Nutcharut (THA)**	**3**
Sizhe Wang (CHN)	0
**Anupama Ramachandran (IND)**	**3**
Chan Wai Lam (HKG)	0
**Narucha Phoemphul (THA)**	**3**
Lu Zhao (CHN)	2
Rebecca Kenna (ENG)	2
**Tessa Davidson (ENG)**	**3**
**Bai Yulu (CHN)**	**3**
Muyan Zhang (CHN)	0
**Yang Meng (CHN)**	**3**
Phakwalan Kongkaew (THA)	2
**Mei Mei Fong (HKG)**	**3**
Han Fang (CHN)	1
Bai Ya Ru (CHN)	0
**Panchaya Channoi (THA)**	**3**
**Ng On-yee (HKG)**	**3**
Li Bi Han (CHN)	2
He Danni (CHN)	0
**Baipat Siripaporn (THA)**	**3**
**Liu Zi Ling (CHN)**	**3**
Katrina Wan (HKG)	0
**Yaqi Yao (CHN)**	**3**
Deng Xin Shun (CHN)	1
**Men Yan So (HKG)**	**3**
Jessica Woods (AUS)	0
Charlene Chai (SIN)	0
**Narantuya Bayarsaikhan (MNG)**	**3**
**Qingning Huang (CHN)**	**3**
Yee Ting Cheung (HKG)	1
Yuk Fan Lau (HKG)	0
**Reanne Evans (ENG)**	**3**

**Last 16**; Best of 7 frames
**Mink Nutcharut (THA)**	**4**
Anupama Ramachandran (IND)	0
**Narucha Phoemphul (THA)**	**4**
Tessa Davidson (ENG)	3
**Bai Yulu (CHN)**	**4**
Yang Meng (CHN)	1
Mei Mei Fong (HKG)	0
**Panchaya Channoi (THA)**	**4**
**Ng On-yee (HKG)**	**4**
Baipat Siripaporn (THA)	1
**Liu Zi Ling (CHN)**	**4**
Yaqi Yao (CHN)	0
Men Yan So (HKG)	3
**Narantuya Bayarsaikhan (MNG)**	**4**
Qingning Huang (CHN)	0
**Reanne Evans (ENG)**	**4**

**Quarter-finals**; Best of 7 frames
**Mink Nutcharut (THA)**	**4**
Narucha Phoemphul (THA)	1
Bai Yulu (CHN)	3
**Panchaya Channoi (THA)**	**4**
**Ng On-yee (HKG)**	**4**
Liu Zi Ling (CHN)	2
Narantuya Bayarsaikhan (MNG)	2
**Reanne Evans (ENG)**	**4**

**Semi-finals**; Best of 9 frames
Mink Nutcharut (THA)	3
**Panchaya Channoi (THA)**	**5**
Ng On-yee (HKG)	1
**Reanne Evans (ENG)**	**5**

**Final**; Best of 11 frames
**Panchaya Channoi (THA)**	**6**
Reanne Evans (ENG)	2

=== Side events ===
==== Seniors ====
Results from the World Women's Seniors Championship are shown below. The match winners are shown in bold.

**Round 1** Best of 5 frames
**Xiaomin Su (CHN)**	**3**
Carlie Tait (AUS)	2
**Deng Xin Shun (CHN)**	**3**
Adiyadolgor Chimedvaam (MNG)	0
Lkham Amirdaa (MNG)	0
**Charlene Chai (SIN)**	**3**
**Xuemei Qiu (CHN)**	**3**
Hong lay Toh (SIN)	1
Jambaa Sosorbaram (MNG)	0
**Ruilan Wu (CHN)**	**3**

**Quarter-finals**; Best of 5 frames
**Tessa Davidson (ENG)**	**3**
Xiaomin Su (CHN)	1
**Deng Xin Shun (CHN)**	**3**
Charlene Chai (SIN)	0
**Han Fang (CHN)**	**3**
Xuemei Qiu (CHN)	0
**Ruilan Wu (CHN)**	**3**
Diana Schuler (GER)	0

**Semi-finals**; Best of 5 frames
Tessa Davidson (ENG)	1
**Deng Xin Shun (CHN)**	**3**
**Han Fang (CHN)**	**3**
Ruilan Wu (CHN)	1

**Final**; Best of 5 frames
**Deng Xin Shun (CHN)**	**3**
Han Fang (CHN)	2

==== Under-21 ====
Results from the World Women's Under-21 Championship are shown below. The match winners are shown in bold.

**Round 1** Best of 5 frames
**Zihan Wang (CHN)**	**3**
Starry Lap Yin Chan (HKG)	0
Qinlin Wei (CHN)	2
**Yan Tung Choi (HKG)**	**3**

**Last 16**; Best of 5 frames
**Panchaya Channoi (THA)**	**3**
Zihan Wang (CHN)	0
Jinhua He (HKG)	0
**Yitong Wang (CHN)**	**3**
**Liu Wei Yi Lu (CHN)**	**3**
Sum Yi Lau (CHN)	0
Ariunaa Baatar (MNG)	0
**Liu Zi Ling (CHN)**	**3**
**Phakwalan Kongkaew (THA)**	**3**
Wan Hei Chen (CHN)	0
Kaijie Xing (CHN)	1
**Li Bi Han (CHN)**	**3**
Ella O'Connor (IRL)	0
**Wang Ruotong (CHN)**	**3**
Yan Tung Choi (HKG)	1
**Narucha Phoemphul (THA)**	**3**

**Quarter-finals**; Best of 5 frames
**Panchaya Channoi (THA)**	**3**
Yitong Wang (CHN)	0
Liu Wei Yi Lu (CHN)	0
**Liu Zi Ling (CHN)**	**3**
Phakwalan Kongkaew (THA)	2
**Li Bi Han (CHN)**	**3**
**Wang Ruotong (CHN)**	**3**
Narucha Phoemphul (THA)	0

**Semi-finals**; Best of 5 frames
**Panchaya Channoi (THA)**	**3**
Liu Zi Ling (CHN)	0
Li Bi Han (CHN)	1
**Wang Ruotong (CHN)**	**3**

**Final**; Best of 5 frames
**Panchaya Channoi (THA)**	**3**
Wang Ruotong (CHN)	2

== Century breaks ==
The event produced two century breaks, a 107 and a 100, both by Panchaya Channoi in the final.
