= 2015 IBSF World Under-21 Snooker Championship =

IBSF World Under-21 Snooker Championship
Tournament information
- Dates: 18–26 July 2015
- City: Bucharest
- Country: Romania
- Organisation: IBSF
- Highest break: (Thailand) Ratchayothin Yotharuck (137)

Final
- Champion: (Thailand) Boonyarit Keattikun
- Runner-up: (Wales) Jamie Clarke
- Score: 8–7

The 2015 IBSF World Under-21 Snooker Championship was an amateur snooker tournament that took place from 18 July to 26 July 2015 in Bucharest, Romania It was the 27th edition of the IBSF World Under-21 Snooker Championship and also doubles as a qualification event for the World Snooker Tour.

The tournament was won by number 1 seed Boonyarit Keattikun who defeated Welshman Jamie Clarke 8–7 in the final. As a result, Keattikun was given a two-year card on the professional World Snooker Tour for the 2016/2017 and 2017/2018 seasons.

== Results ==
=== Round 1 ===
Best of 7 frames

1	(Thailand) Boonyarit Keattikun	4–2	64	(Republic of Ireland) Aaron Moyles
33	(England) Luke Garland	4–1	32	(Belgium) Kobe Vanoppen
17	(Australia) Ryan Thomerson	4–2	48	(Czech Republic) Ales Herout
49	(Germany) Simon Lichtenberg	4–0	16	(Austria) Florian Nüßle
9	(China) Zhao Xintong	4–1	28	(Netherlands) Tim De Ruyter
41	(Scotland) Chris Totten	4–2	24	(Israel) Shachar Ruberg
25	(Israel) Maor Shalom	4–2	40	(Hong Kong) Ming Wa Man
57	(Lithuania) Vilius Schulte	1–4	8	(England) Joe O'Connor
5	(England) Ashley Carty	4–0	60	(Belgium) Jesse Schelfhaut
37	(Hong Kong) Man Hoi Leong	3–4	28	(Malta) Chris Peplow
21	(England) Louis Heathcote	4–1	44	(Hong Kong) Yun Fung Tam
53	(France) Niel Vincent	0–4	12	(Scotland) Lee Mein
13	(China) Wang Yuchen	4–0	52	(Brazil) Gabriel Martins Campos
45	(Romania) Vladu Mihai	0–4	20	(Thailand) Ratchayothin Yotharuck
29	(Wales) Callum Lloyd	1–4	36	(Sweden) Belan Sharif
61	(Russia) Ivan Kakovsky	1–4	4	(Iran) Siyavosh Mozayani

3	(Hong Kong) Ka Wai Cheung	4–0	62	(Latvia) Rodion Judin
35	(Wales) Tyler Rees	4–3	30	(Germany) Lukas Kleckers
19	(Scotland) Dylan Craig	4–1	46	(India) Shrikrishna Suryanarayanan
51	(Romania) Andrei Orzan	1–4	41	(Poland) Mateusz Baranowski
11	(England) Brandon Sargeant	4–2	54	(Poland) Maciej Kusak
43	(Bulgaria) Spasian Spasov	1–4	22	(Egypt) Abdelrahman Shahin
27	(Austria) Dominik Scherübl	4–3	38	(New Zealand) Louis Chand
59	(Finland) Olli-Pekka Virho	0–4	6	(Wales) Jamie Clarke
7	(Republic of Ireland) Josh Boileau	4–3	58	(India) Hrithik Jain
39	(Austria) Manuel Pomwenger	2–4	26	(Republic of Ireland) Stephen Bateman
23	(South Korea) Daegyu Lee	4–3	42	(Republic of Ireland) Shane Bates
55	(Egypt) Abdelrahman Abdelhamid	2–4	10	(Malta) Brian Cini
15	(Switzerland) Alexander Ursenbacher	4–1	50	(India) Avinash Kumar
47	(Israel) Amir Nardeia	0–4	18	(Wales) Tom Rees
31	(Australia) Arthur Lin	4–2	34	(France) Alexis Callewaert
63	(Brazil) Amaury Rocha Filho	2–4	2	(Poland) Kacper Filipiak

Round 2 Best of 9 frames
1	(Thailand) Boonyarit Keattikun	5
33	(England) Luke Garland	1
17	(Australia) Ryan Thomerson	5
49	(Germany) Simon Lichtenberg	1
9	(China) Zhao Xintong	5
41	(Scotland) Chris Totten	0
25	(Israel) Maor Shalom	3
8	(England) Joe O'Connor	5
5	(England) Ashley Carty	5
28	(Malta) Chris Peplow	3
21	(England) Louis Heathcote	3
12	(Scotland) Lee Mein	5
13	(China) Wang Yuchen	5
20	(Thailand) Ratchayothin Yotharuck	3
36	(Sweden) Belan Sharif	1
4	(Iran) Siyavosh Mozayani	5
3	(Hong Kong) Ka Wai Cheung	2
35	(Wales) Tyler Rees	5
19	(Scotland) Dylan Craig	5
14	(Poland) Mateusz Baranowski	3
11	(England) Brandon Sargeant	5
22	(Egypt) Abdelrahman Shahin	0
27	(Austria) Dominik Scherübl	1
6	(Wales) Jamie Clarke	5
7	(Republic of Ireland) Josh Boileau	5
26	(Republic of Ireland) Stephen Bateman	1
23	(South Korea) Daegyu Lee	0
10	(Malta) Brian Cini	5
15	(Switzerland) Alexander Ursenbacher	5
18	(Wales) Tom Rees	1
31	(Australia) Arthur Lin	1
2	(Poland) Kacper Filipiak	5

Round 3 Best of 9 frames
1	(Thailand) Boonyarit Keattikun	5
17	(Australia) Ryan Thomerson	4
9	(China) Zhao Xintong	5
8	(England) Joe O'Connor	3
5	(England) Ashley Carty	5
12	(Scotland) Lee Mein	3
13	(China) Wang Yuchen	5
4	(Iran) Siyavosh Mozayani	2
35	(Wales) Tyler Rees	1
19	(Scotland) Dylan Craig	5
11	(England) Brandon Sargeant	4
6	(Wales) Jamie Clarke	5
7	(Republic of Ireland) Josh Boileau	5
10	(Malta) Brain Cini	1
15	(Switzerland) Alexander Ursenbacher	4
2	(Poland) Kacper Filipiak	5

Quarter-Finals; Best of 9 frames
1	(Thailand) Boonyarit Keattikun	6
9	(China) Zhao Xintong	2
5	(England) Ashley Carty	4
13	(China) Wang Yuchen	6
19	(Scotland) Dylan Craig	5
6	(Wales) Jamie Clarke	6
7	(Republic of Ireland) Josh Boileau	6
2	(Poland) Kacper Filipiak	5

Semi-Finals; Best of 11 frames
1	(Thailand) Boonyarit Keattikun	7
13	(China) Wang Yuchen	0
6	(Wales) Jamie Clarke	7
7	(Republic of Ireland) Josh Boileau	3

Final; Best of 15 frames
1	(Thailand) Boonyarit Keattikun	8
6	(Wales) Jamie Clarke	7
