= 2018 World Snooker Championship =

Professional snooker tournament

2018 Betfred World Snooker Championship

Tournament information
- Dates: 21 April – 7 May 2018
- Venue: Crucible Theatre
- City: Sheffield
- Country: England
- Organisation: World Snooker
- Format: Ranking event
- Total prize fund: £1,968,000
- Winner's share: £425,000
- Highest break: John Higgins (SCO) (146)

Final
- Champion: Mark Williams (WAL)
- Runner-up: (Scotland) John Higgins
- Score: 18–16

The 2018 World Snooker Championship (officially the 2018 Betfred World Snooker Championship) was a professional snooker tournament held from 21 April to 7 May 2018 at the Crucible Theatre in Sheffield, England. Hosted by the World Professional Billiards and Snooker Association, it was the 20th and final ranking event of the 2017–18 snooker season and the 42nd consecutive time the World Snooker Championship had been held at the venue. The tournament was broadcast by BBC Sport and Eurosport in Europe, and sponsored by betting company Betfred.

Welsh left-hander Mark Williams won his third world championship and 21st ranking title, defeating Scottish professional John Higgins 18–16 in the final. Williams' victory came 15 years after his second world title in 2003; before the start of the season, he had not won a ranking event in the previous six years. In winning the event, Williams received the highest prize money awarded for a snooker event, £425,000 of a total pool of £1,968,000. Aged 43, he was the third oldest winner at the crucible after Ronnie O'Sullivan who was 44 when he won the 2020 World Snooker Championship and Ray Reardon who was 45 when he won the title in 1978. Defending and three-time world champion Mark Selby had won the world title for the previous two years, but lost in the first round 4–10 to Joe Perry.

The highest break of the championship was scored by Higgins, who made a break of 146 in frame 13 of his second round win over Jack Lisowski. However, in qualifying for the event, Liang Wenbo scored a maximum break of 147.

== Background ==
The World Snooker Championship is an annual cue sport tournament and is the official world championship of the game of snooker. Snooker was founded in the late 19th century by British Army soldiers stationed in India. The sport originated by players from the United Kingdom, and later players from Europe and the Commonwealth. In more modern times, the sport has transferred to being played worldwide, specifically in Asia, such as in China, Thailand and Hong Kong. The world championship was the final event of the 2017/18 snooker calendar, with the winner of the event being crowned as the professional world champion of the sport.

The world championship sees 32 professional players compete in one-on-one snooker matches in a single elimination format, each played over several frames. The 32 players for the event are selected through a mix of the world snooker rankings and a pre-tournament qualification round. The first world championship in 1927, held in Camkin's Hall, Birmingham, England, was won by Joe Davis. Since 1977, the event has been held in the Crucible Theatre in Sheffield.

As of 2022, Stephen Hendry and Ronnie O'Sullivan are the event's most successful participants in the modern era, having both won the championship seven times. The previous year's championship had been won by England's Mark Selby, who won the event defeating Scotland's John Higgins in the final 18–15. This was Selby's third championship, having won previously in 2014 and 2016. The champion of the 2018 event would win prize money of £425,000, from a total pool of £1,968,000.

=== Format ===
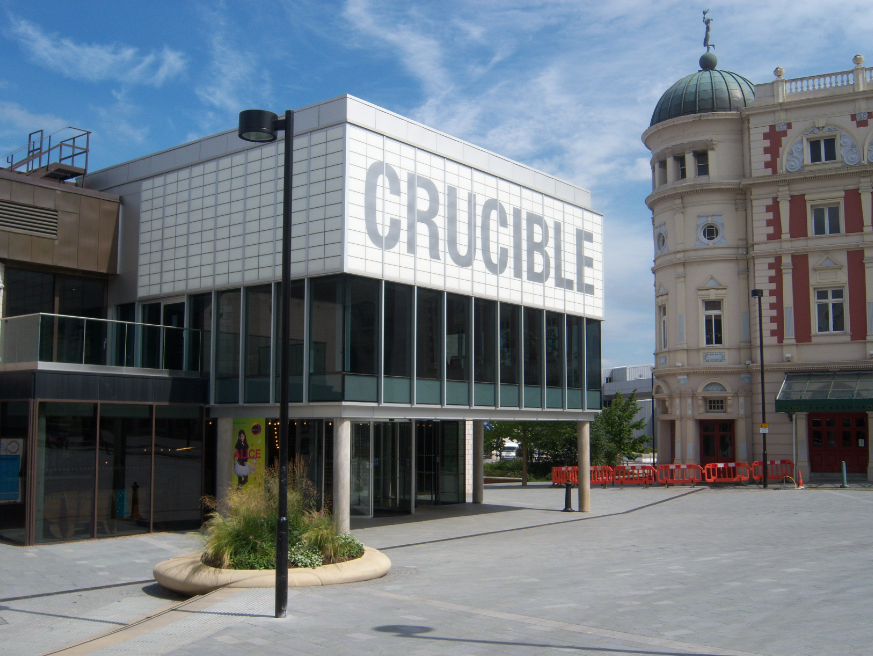
The main draw of the 2018 tournament was played at the Crucible Theatre in Sheffield.

The 2018 World Snooker Championship was held between 21 April and 7 May 2018 in Sheffield, England. The tournament was the last of twenty rankings events in the 2017/2018 season on the World Snooker Tour. It featured a 32-player main draw that was played at the Crucible Theatre, as well as a 128-player qualifying draw which took place at the English Institute of Sport from 11 to 18 April 2018, finishing three days prior to the start of the main draw. This was the 42nd consecutive year the tournament was held at the Crucible, and the 50th consecutive year the championship was contested through the modern knockout format.

The top 16 players in the latest world rankings automatically qualified for the main draw as seeded players. (Note: In the event that the defending champion was ranked outside of the top 16, they would have replaced the player ranked world number 16 as an automatic qualifier.) Defending champion Mark Selby was automatically seeded 1st overall. The remaining fifteen seeds were allocated based on the latest world rankings (revision 10), which were released following the China Open, the penultimate event of the season. With Selby ranked as the world number 1 entering the event, every player's seed therefore corresponded to their respective world ranking. Matches in the first round of the main draw were played as best of 19 frames. The number of frames needed to win a match increased with each successive round, leading up to the final match which was played as best of 35 frames.

All 16 non-seeded spots in the main draw were filled with players from the qualifying rounds. The qualifying draw consisted of 128 players, including 113 of the remaining 115 players on the World Snooker Tour, as well as fifteen wildcard places allotted to non-tour players. These invited players included the women's world champion, the European junior champion, and all four semi-finalists at the amateur championship. As with the main draw, half of the participants in the qualifying draw were seeded players. Every player ranked from 17th to 80th was allocated one of 64 seeds in order of their ranking, while all of the other participants were placed randomly into the draw. In order to reach the main draw at the Crucible, players needed to win three best of 19 frame matches.

=== Participant summary ===
Eight former world champions participated in the main tournament: Ronnie O'Sullivan (five titles: 2001, 2004, 2008, 2012, 2013), John Higgins (four titles: 1998, 2007, 2009, 2011), Mark Selby (three titles and two-time defending champion: 2014, 2016, 2017), Mark Williams (two titles: 2000 and 2003), Shaun Murphy (one title: 2005), Graeme Dott (one title: 2006), Neil Robertson (one title: 2010), and Stuart Bingham (one title: 2015). This was O'Sullivan's 26th consecutive appearance in the final stages of the World Championship since his debut in 1993, just one short of Stephen Hendry's record of 27 consecutive appearances and four short of Steve Davis's record of 30 total appearances. Five other former world championship finalists also competed: Matthew Stevens (twice: 2000 and 2005), Ali Carter (twice: 2008 and 2012), Judd Trump (once: 2011), Barry Hawkins (once: 2013), and Ding Junhui (once: 2016). The youngest player to participate in the main stage of the tournament was Lyu Haotian at 20 years of age, while 43-year-old Joe Perry was the oldest; both players entered the main draw through qualifying. Marco Fu made his return to competition at the World Championship, having missed much of the 2017/2018 season after undergoing surgery to repair retinal degeneration and myodesopsia in his left eye.

Three former world champions participated in the qualifying rounds: Ken Doherty (1997), Peter Ebdon (2002) and Graeme Dott (2006). Of these, only Dott succeeded in qualifying for the main tournament at the Crucible. Also, three former world finalists participated in the qualifying rounds: Jimmy White (six times: 1984 and 1990–1994), Nigel Bond (once: 1995) and Matthew Stevens (twice: 2000 and 2005). Of these, only Stevens qualified for the main tournament at the Crucible. The youngest participant in qualifying was Jackson Page at 16 years of age, while 55-year-old Jimmy White was the oldest participant; however, neither player qualified.

=== Prize fund ===
The breakdown of prize money for 2018 is shown below.

- Winner: £425,000
- Runner-up: £180,000
- Semi-finalists: £85,000
- Quarter-finalists: £42,500
- Last 16: £27,500
- Last 32: £18,000
- Last 48: £13,500
- Last 80: £9,000
- Televised highest break: £10,000
- Non-televised highest break: £1,000
- Total: £1,968,000

The prize for a maximum break in the main rounds was boosted to £40,000, (Note: The "rolling 147 prize" stood at £5,000 (prize money carried forward to next ranking event if 147 not achieved in main tournament).) whereas the prize for a 147 in qualifying was £10,000. The latter prize was claimed by Liang Wenbo during his first qualifying round match against Rod Lawler.

== Summary ==
=== Qualifying rounds ===
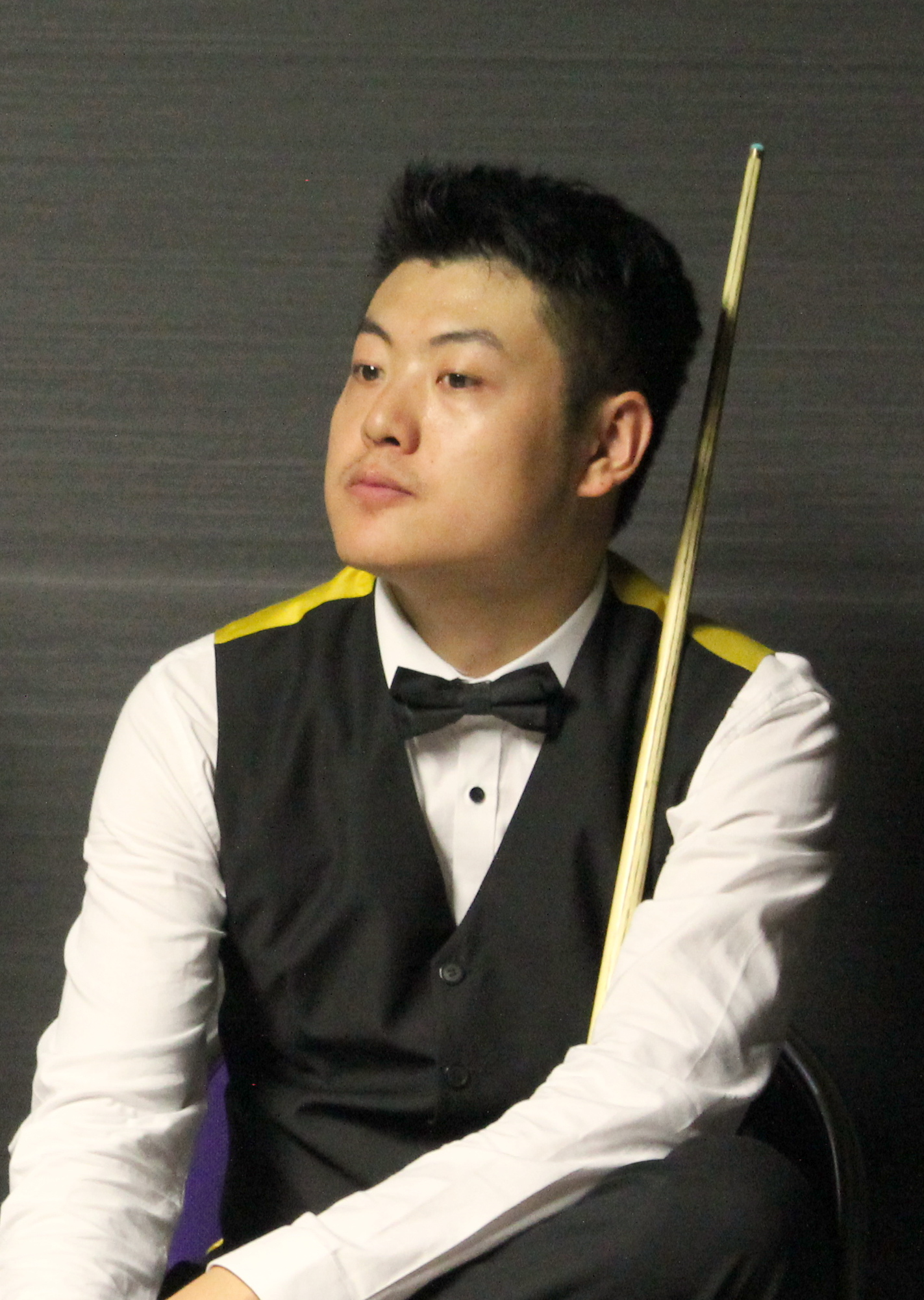
During the qualifying rounds, Liang Wenbo achieved his third professional maximum break.

The qualifying rounds took place at the English Institute of Sport from 11 to 18 April 2018. In the first round of qualifying, Liang Wenbo achieved his third professional maximum break, and his second of the 2017/2018 season, in the 10th frame of his match against Rod Lawler. It was the second consecutive year a 147 was made in World Championship qualifying, and the fourth time overall. Liang came very close to becoming the first player to score two maximums in the same match, but he missed the final black after a break of 140 in the last frame. Liang was eliminated in the third round of qualifying; ranked at world number 19, he was the highest-ranked player not to feature in the main draw of the tournament, as both world number 17 Ryan Day and world number 18 Stephen Maguire qualified.

Only seven of the 64 unseeded participants in qualifying (players ranked outside the world's top 80) made it through the first qualifying round, and only one of those seven, Adam Duffy, progressed to the third qualifying round. Duffy did not, however, qualify for the main draw at the Crucible. Four players qualified for the Crucible for the first time: Lyu Haotian, Liam Highfield, Thepchaiya Un-Nooh, and Chris Wakelin. Lyu was the lowest ranked player to reach the main stage, at world number 68.

=== First round ===
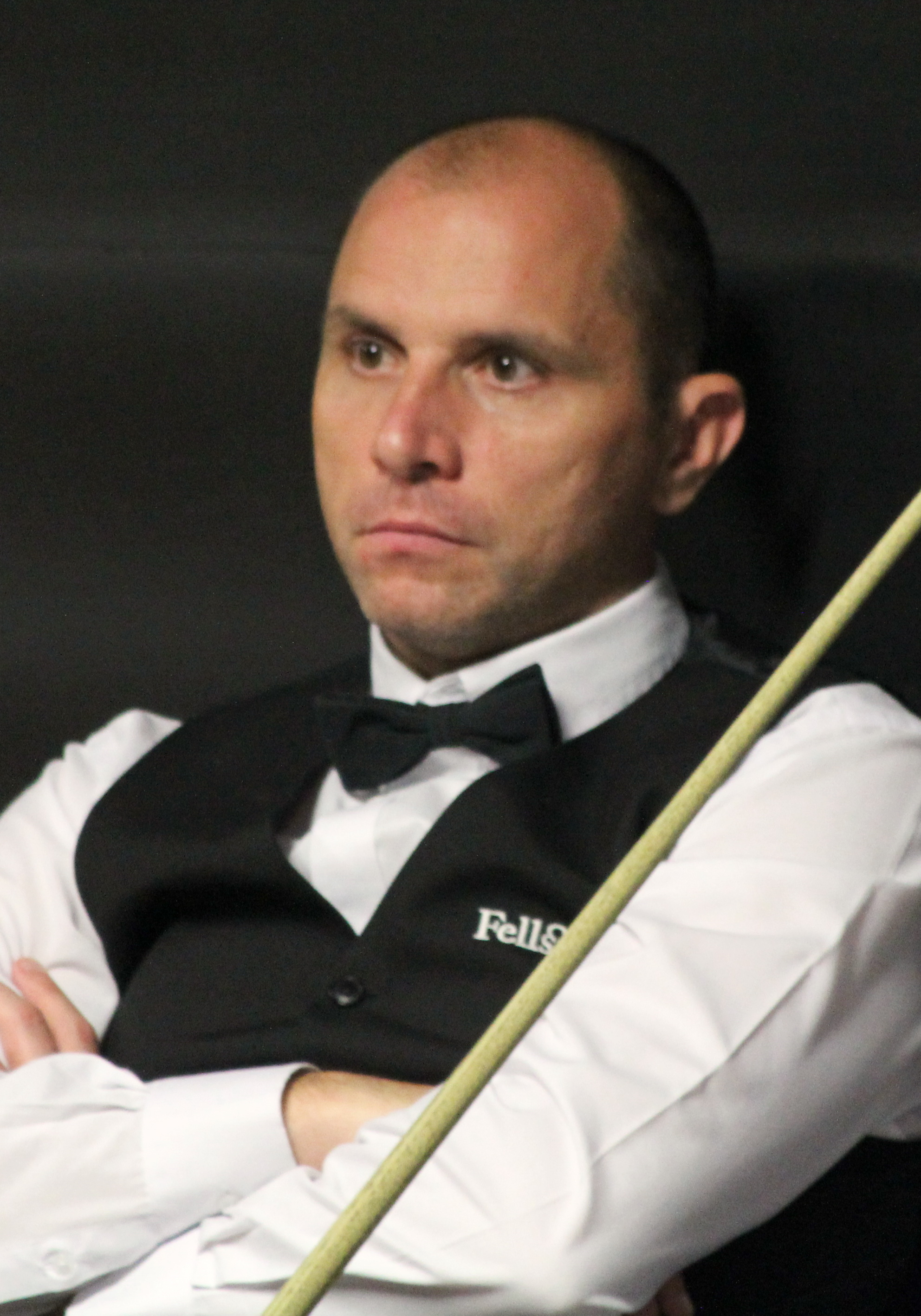
Joe Perry defeated world number 1, and defending champion, Mark Selby in the first round.

The draw for the opening round of the main tournament was conducted on 19 April 2018, two days before the start of the competition. Technical issues delayed the 10:00 BST start time by two hours, to 12:00. The matches for the first round were spread out over six days from 21 to 26 April, and played using a two table setup in the Crucible Theatre. Each first round match was played over two sessions, as best of 19 frames (10 frames needed to win). Players and spectators criticised the two-hour delay to the tournament's first-round draw, which was caused by "technical issues". World number 22 Joe Perry called the draw "an absolute joke", claiming the delay caused qualifiers to "have no idea when [they] are playing, have to book hotels and make travel plans".

Of the sixteen first round matches, six ended with qualifiers defeating seeded players. The biggest upset of the round happened in the opening match, when Joe Perry defeated the defending champion and world number 1 Mark Selby. Perry won the first four frames before pulling away to 7–2 ahead after the first session of play. Selby was unable to catch Perry and was defeated 4–10, ending his 10-match undefeated streak in the world championships, as well as his two-year reign as world champion. The next highest ranked player to lose was world number 8 Shaun Murphy, who was upset by world number 51 Jamie Jones in a tight 10–9 match, where the scores were level at various stages.

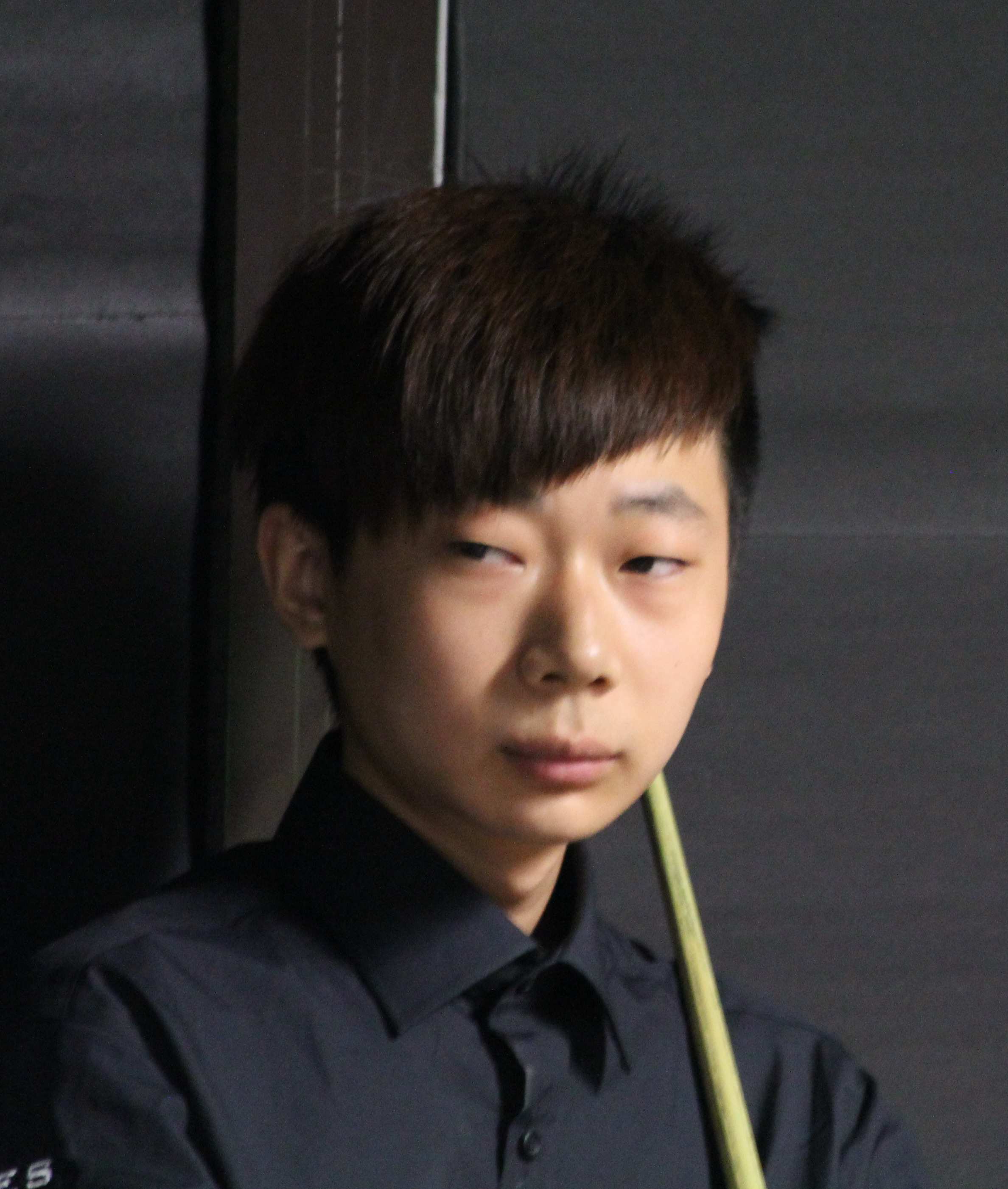
The youngest player of the main draw, Lyu Haotian, was knocked out in the second round.

The other four seeds to lose were the players ranked 10 through 13 in the world. Chinese debutant Lyu Haotian, both the youngest and lowest ranked player in the draw, defeated world number 11 Marco Fu in Fu's return to the Tour after eye surgery. Lyu was the only debutant to advance; he was 6–3 up after the first session and went on to win the match 10–5. Robert Milkins defeated world number 10 Neil Robertson 10–5. Jack Lisowski defeated world number 12 Stuart Bingham 10–7, thereby securing his first world championship match win in his second attempt. The 2015 world champion Bingham stated he was going to take a leave of absence from the sport after the loss. Bingham said he wanted to "spend some time with the family and put my cue down for a while". Bingham had spent three months of the season serving a ban for betting infringements; he commented, "It's not been the best of seasons in general, but on the table I've been pretty good." Ricky Walden defeated world number 13 Luca Brecel 10–6; he was comfortably five frames ahead at 8–3, when Brecel won the next three frames to bring the score to 8–6, before Walden won the last two frames of the match.

Of the eight former world champions playing in the main stage of the tournament, only three progressed to the second round: Ronnie O'Sullivan (five-time champion), John Higgins (four-time champion) and Mark Williams (two-time champion). All three were top seven seeds and had turned professional in the same year, 1992. Ronnie O'Sullivan trailed 0–4 and then 3–6 after the opening session in his match against Stephen Maguire but then won seven of the last eight frames to win 10–7. The 16th frame of this encounter was O'Sullivan's 1000th frame win at the Crucible. This was also his 15th consecutive first round victory at the world championships. John Higgins defeated Thai debutant Thepchaiya Un-Nooh 10–7. Both players attempted maximum breaks: Higgins missed the 14th red ball on 104 in the 8th frame of the first session; Un-Nooh scored 14 reds with blacks, on course for his second career maximum, before missing the 15th red on 112 in the 12th frame of the final session. Mark Williams defeated Jimmy Robertson in his first round match 10–5. Williams led 7–2 after the initial session, then he hit a tournament highest break (at that point) of 140 in the 13th frame, to go 9–4 ahead, before winning the match after two further frames.

In addition to O'Sullivan, Ali Carter and Anthony McGill both advanced despite trailing by three frames in the middle of their matches. Carter defeated Graeme Dott 10–8 in his first round match, despite being behind 3–6 overnight. McGill defeated Ryan Day 10–8; after trailing 5–8 earlier in the match, McGill won the last five frames to secure his place in the second round. He said he could not believe he had won, and the BBC referred to McGill's win as an "unbelievable comeback". The closing match of the first round saw the second final frame decider, after Jones's upset of Murphy. Recovering from 4–8 behind against Judd Trump, debutant Chris Wakelin won four frames in a row, to draw level at 8–8. The two players shared the next two frames, bringing the score to nine apiece, before Trump took the deciding frame.

The winners of the remaining matches of the round were Kyren Wilson, Mark Allen, Barry Hawkins, and Ding Junhui. Wilson defeated Matthew Stevens 10–3. In the 12th frame, Stevens accidentally nudged the pink ball with his hand and declared a foul on himself, which allowed Wilson to win the frame, extending his lead to 9–3. Allen, the reigning Masters champion, defeated debutant Liam Highfield 10–5; neither player scored a century, although Highfield came close with two breaks of 99. Hawkins defeated Stuart Carrington 10–7, after winning a 55-minute 14th frame. For the second successive year, Ding faced a fellow Chinese player in the first round of the tournament; having defeated Zhou Yuelong in 2017, he faced Xiao Guodong in 2018. Ding came out as a convincing 10–3 winner, despite losing the opening two frames of the match.

=== Second round ===
The second round matches were played as best of 25 frames (13 frames needed to win), each over three sessions using a two table setup. The first match of the second round was between Mark Allen and Joe Perry, who defeated the defending champion in the first round. After sharing the first two sessions of their second round match at 8–8, Allen won all five frames in the third session to go through to the quarter-finals with a 13–8 win.

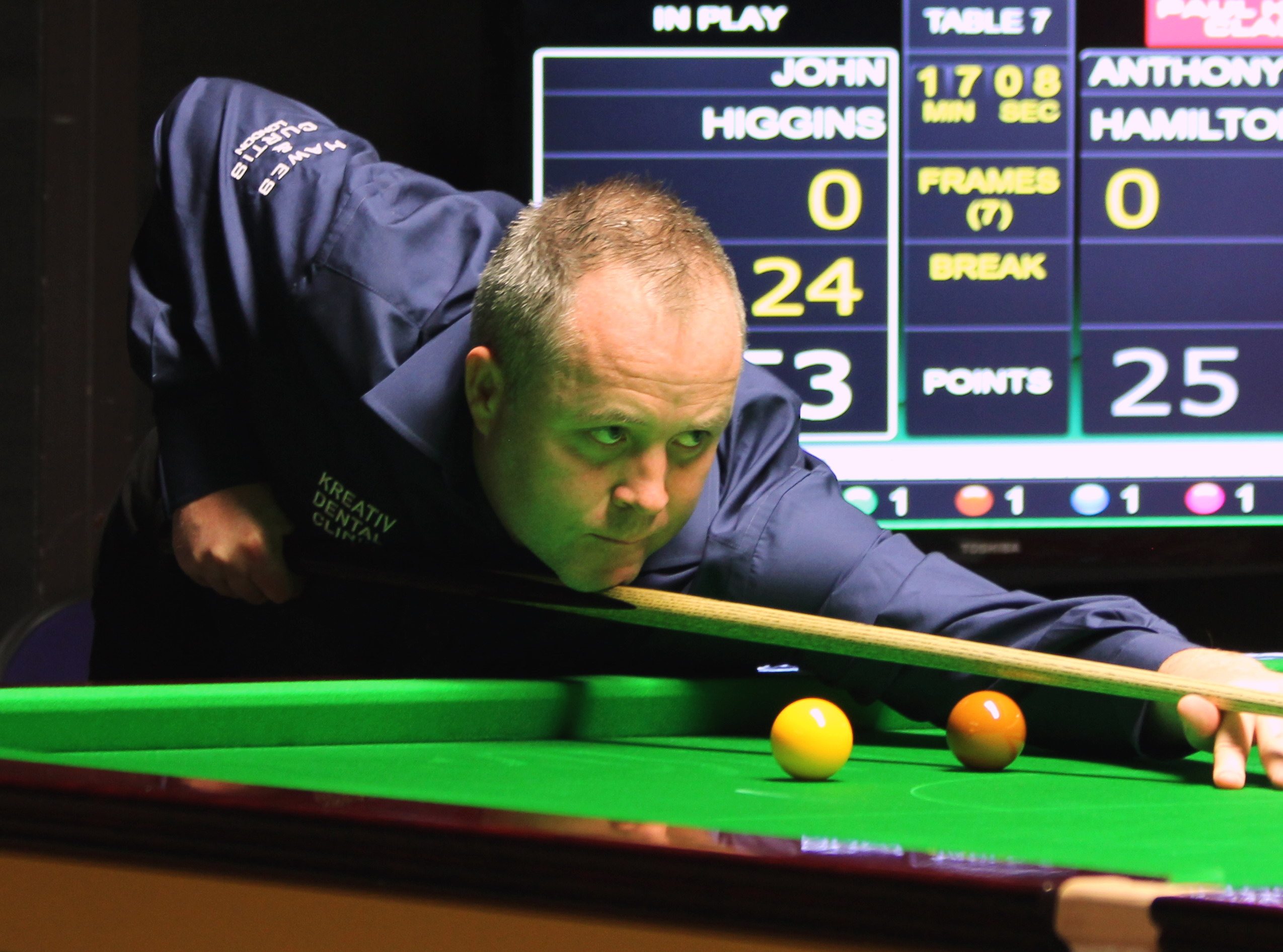
John Higgins scored a 146 break in his second round match, and later won 13–1.

Barry Hawkins defeated Lyu Haotian 13–10 in their second round match, to enter the quarter-finals for the sixth consecutive year. The pair were level at 10–10 before Hawkins won the last three frames of the match. Ali Carter played Ronnie O'Sullivan in the second round, a rematch of both the 2008 and the 2012 World Championship finals. The two players came into contact and exchanged words after the 19th frame of the match. The pair had brushed shoulders, in an incident The Independent described as a "barge". Following the match, O'Sullivan described it as being "overplayed" by the media. Having defeated O'Sullivan on only one occasion from a total of seventeen attempts in the group stages of the non-ranking 2010 Championship League, Carter eventually triumphed 13–9 to advance to the quarter-finals.

Kyren Wilson secured a place in the quarter-finals by defeating Jamie Jones 13–5, winning all of the last six frames of the match. During a clearance in the penultimate frame, Wilson played a screw shot which jumped the cueball off the table, damaging the head of his cue tip. John Higgins defeated Jack Lisowski 13–1, with a session to spare; Lisowski scored his only frame of the match at 0–10 behind. In the 13th frame, Higgins scored a break of 146, one point short of a maximum. This was Higgins' highest break at the Crucible (until 147 in the 2020 tournament), and it was the highest anyone scored in the 2018 tournament.

The remaining three matches of the second round finished with Ding Junhui defeating Anthony McGill 13–4, after having won the first session of their match 8–0 and scoring seven 50+ breaks. Judd Trump defeated Ricky Walden 13–9, taking a late lead after the score drew level at 8–8 following the first two sessions. Mark Williams defeated Robert Milkins, 13–7, thereby eliminating the only remaining qualifier in the competition.

=== Quarter-finals ===
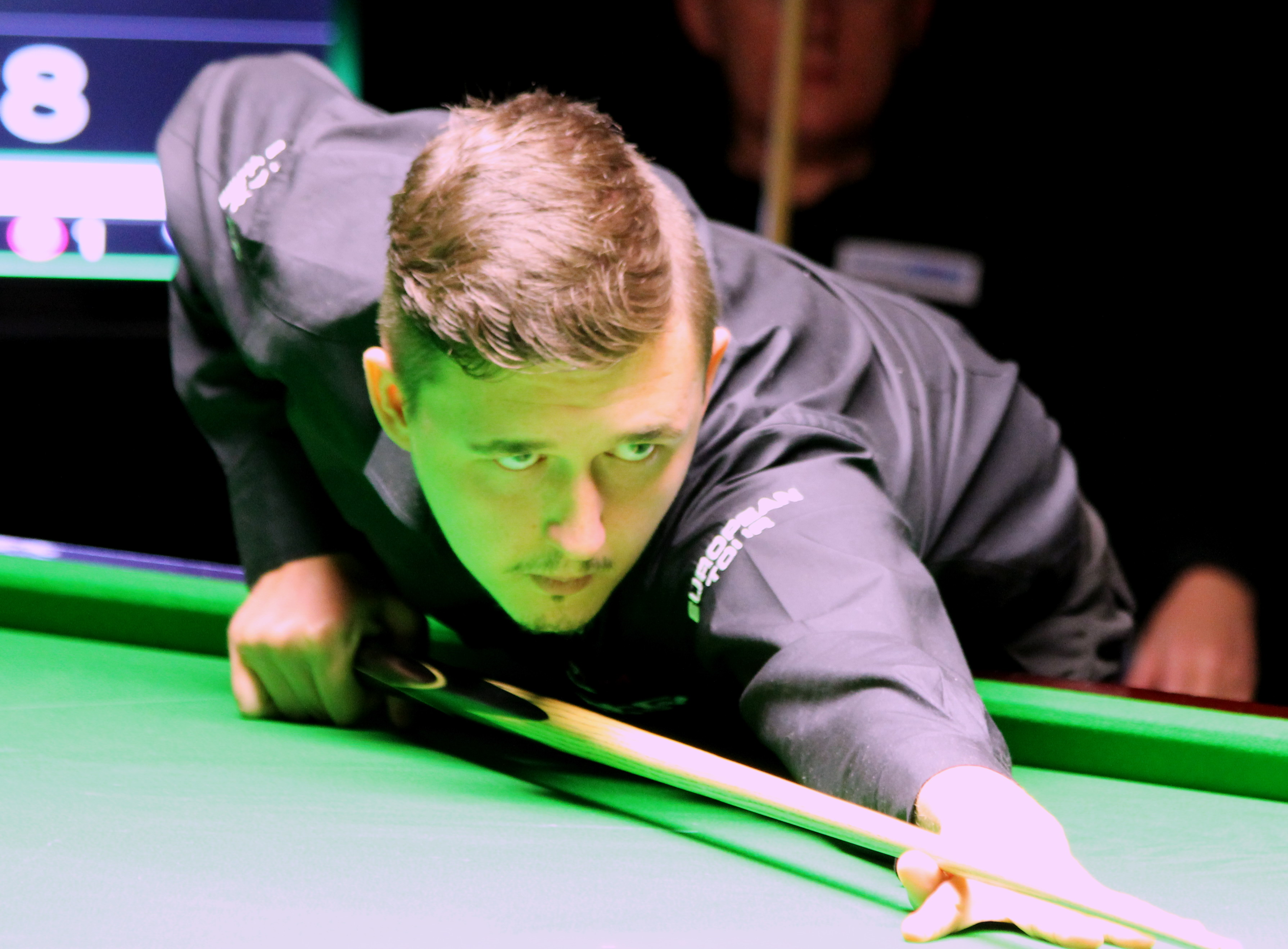
Kyren Wilson defeated Mark Allen in their quarter-final match, 13–6.

The quarter-finals were also played as best of 25 frames, each over three sessions using a two table setup, with the four matches played on 1 and 2 May 2018. All eight of the quarter-finalists were seeded players, with Mark Allen the lowest ranked player left in the competition at world number 16. Barry Hawkins defeated Ding Junhui 13–5, to make it through to his fifth Crucible semi-final in six years. Kyren Wilson played Mark Allen, in a repeat of the 2018 Masters final just over three months prior. Despite having lost to Allen in that match, Wilson took an 11–5 lead over Allen overnight, eventually winning the match 13–6. With this victory, Wilson made it through to his first ever Crucible semi-final, having lost in the quarter-finals in the previous two World Championships. Mark Williams took leads of 5–3 and 9–7 after the first two sessions against Ali Carter. Williams then won four of the last five frames, with four breaks of 100 or more, to defeat Carter 13–8.

The closest quarter-final was the last match, between John Higgins and Judd Trump, which was a rematch of the 2011 World Championship final. Trump gained an early lead in the second session at 7–3, but Higgins won the next five frames, and the pair finished the session at 8–8. Trump won the next two frames and took a two-frame lead at 11–9, before Higgins won the next three frames to retake the lead at 12–11. Trump won the 24th frame to force a final frame decider, which Higgins won to clinch the match, later describing it as a "classic" and joking that Trump "must hate the sight of him".

=== Semi-finals ===
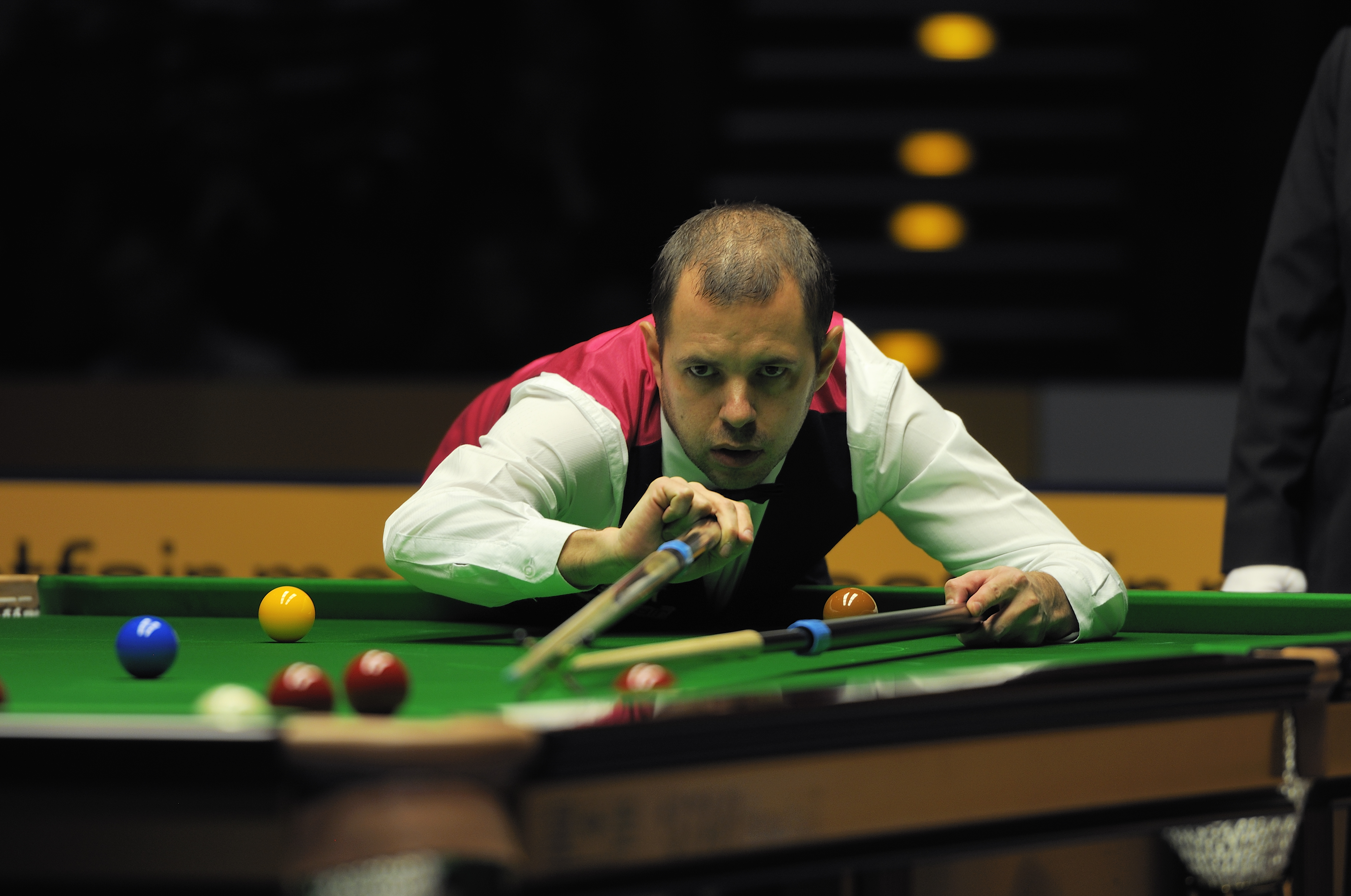
Barry Hawkins reached the semi-finals, but lost 15–17 to Mark Williams.

The semi-finals were each played over four sessions, between 3 and 5 May 2018, with the matches played as best of 33 frames (17 frames needed to win) in a single table setup. The first semi-final was between John Higgins and Kyren Wilson. Higgins took an early lead in the opening session, leading Wilson 5–3, and retained this lead into the next two sessions, at 9–7, and 13–11. The pair shared the next four frames to leave the match at 15–13, before Higgins won the final two frames to win 17–13.

The second semi-final was between Barry Hawkins and Mark Williams. Hawkins took a similar lead over Williams, with Hawkins taking 5–3, 9–7, and 13–11 leads, before going into the final session. Williams made a comeback, drawing level at 14 frames apiece, and then again at 15 all. Williams took the lead for the first time in the match at 16–15, before winning it 17–15. His victory ensured that, for the first time since the World Championship moved to the Crucible in 1977, both finalists would be over 40 years old.

=== Final ===
The two finalists were John Higgins and Mark Williams, both multiple former champions. The final was played as a best of 35 frames match (18 frames needed to win), spread over four sessions between 6 and 7 May 2018. Williams took an early lead in the first session of the match, winning all of the first four frames. Higgins won the second mini-session 3–1, so the first session ended with a 5–3 lead for Williams. In the second session, Williams took the next two frames to lead 7–3, before Higgins scored four consecutive frames to level the score at 7–7. Williams then pulled away once again, winning the final three frames to take a 10–7 lead overnight.

Williams won the first four frames on the second day of the final, extending his winning streak to seven frames and his lead to 14–7, before Higgins pulled two frames back after the mid-session interval. In the second of those frames, Higgins won with a 72 counter-clearance after Williams missed on a break of 65. In the following frame, Higgins started on a maximum break, which had never been achieved in a World Championship final; he potted ten reds with blacks but could not complete the clearance. Nevertheless, he secured his third successive frame with the break of 80, reducing his deficit to 10–14. Williams took the last frame to win the session 5–3, giving him a 15–10 lead heading into the final session of the championship.

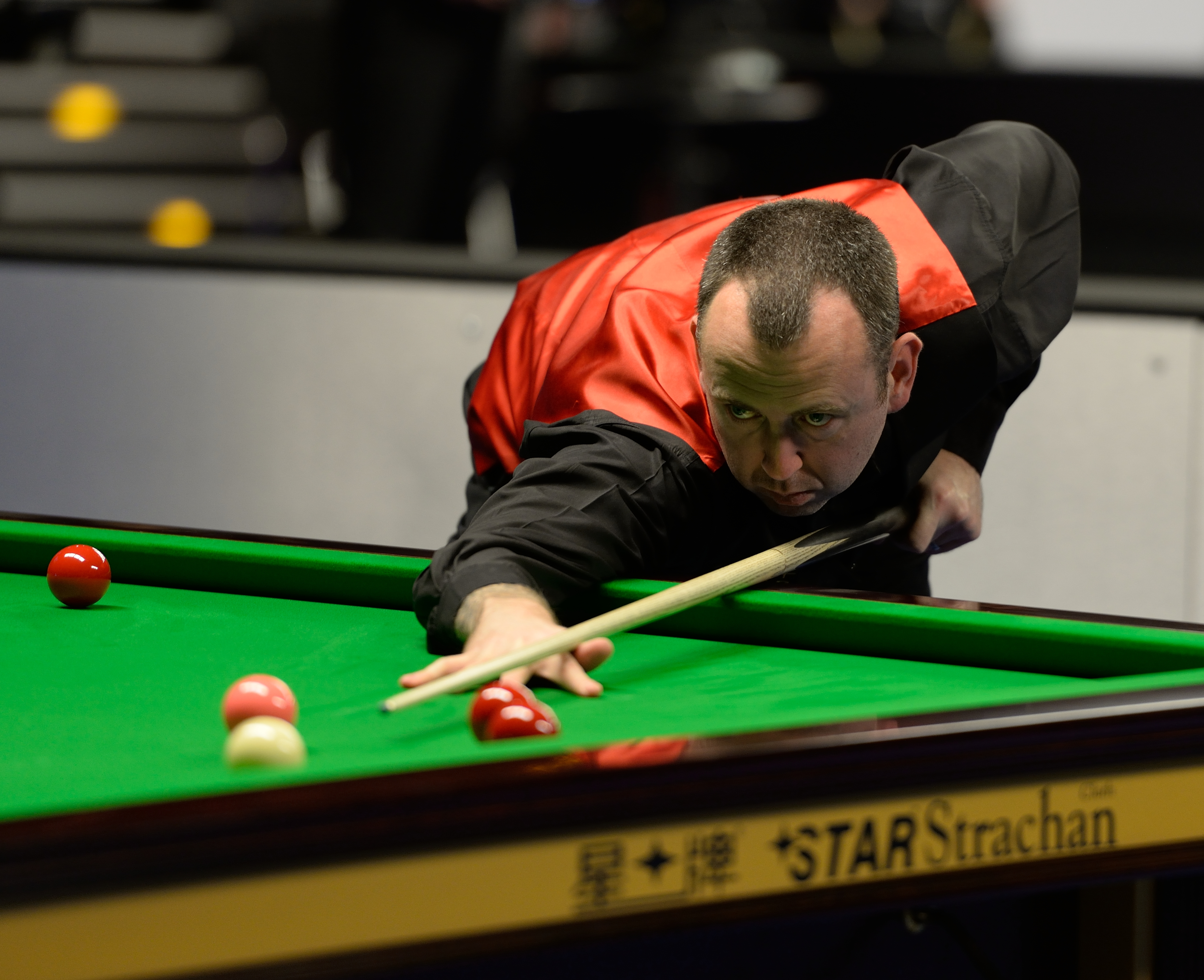
Mark Williams won his third world title, with an 18–16 win against John Higgins in the final match of the tournament.

Higgins responded by winning the first five frames of the final session to level the match at 15–15, including three clearances and a match highest break of 131. Williams then won his first frame of the evening, and followed it up with a 100 break to take the score to 17–15, thus requiring one further frame to round off the match. In the 33rd frame, on a break of 63, Williams missed a pink that would have clinched the title; Higgins then cleared the table for a break of 65 to pull the score to 16–17. In the 34th frame, Williams held his nerve to make a match-winning break of 69, concluding the match at 18–16 and securing his third world title.

On winning the championship, Williams said "The turnaround in the past twelve months is something I cannot work out", after not having appeared in the competition in the previous season. Before the tournament, Williams had said if he won the world title he would attend the post tournament press conference naked. Following his victory, Williams entered the conference wearing only a towel around his waist, but removed it when he was safely seated behind a table. Williams then promised that if he was to win the next season, he would "cartwheel round here naked".

Williams' victory came fifteen years after his last world title in 2003; this was the longest span between two successive wins in the history of the tournament. At the age of 43, Williams became the oldest world champion since Ray Reardon won the event in 1978 aged 45. At the 2020 World Snooker Championship, O'Sullivan won the event at the age of 44.)

== Main draw ==
The numbers in parentheses are players' seedings. Players listed in bold indicate match winner.

**First round** Best of 19 frames
21 April
Mark Selby (ENG) (1)	4
**Joe Perry (ENG)**	**10**
22 & 23 April
**Mark Allen (NIR) (16)**	**10**
Liam Highfield (ENG)	5
21 & 22 April
**Kyren Wilson (ENG) (9)**	**10**
Matthew Stevens (WAL)	3
22 & 23 April
Shaun Murphy (ENG) (8)	9
**Jamie Jones (WAL)**	**10**
25 April
**John Higgins (SCO) (5)**	**10**
Thepchaiya Un-Nooh (THA)	7
24 April
Stuart Bingham (ENG) (12)	7
**Jack Lisowski (ENG)**	**10**
23 & 24 April
Luca Brecel (BEL) (13)	6
**Ricky Walden (ENG)**	**10**
25 & 26 April
**Judd Trump (ENG) (4)**	**10**
Chris Wakelin (ENG)	9
23 & 24 April
**Ding Junhui (CHN) (3)**	**10**
Xiao Guodong (CHN)	3
25 & 26 April
**Anthony McGill (SCO) (14)**	**10**
Ryan Day (WAL)	8
21 & 22 April
Marco Fu (HKG) (11)	5
**Lyu Haotian (CHN)**	**10**
23 April
**Barry Hawkins (ENG) (6)**	**10**
Stuart Carrington (ENG)	7
24 & 25 April
**Mark Williams (WAL) (7)**	**10**
Jimmy Robertson (ENG)	5
24 & 25 April
Neil Robertson (AUS) (10)	5
**Robert Milkins (ENG)**	**10**
21 & 22 April
**Ali Carter (ENG) (15)**	**10**
Graeme Dott (SCO)	8
21 & 22 April
**Ronnie O'Sullivan (ENG) (2)**	**10**
Stephen Maguire (SCO)	7

**Second round** Best of 25 frames
26 & 27 April
(England) Joe Perry	8
(Northern Ireland) **Mark Allen (16)**	**13**
27 & 28 April
(England) **Kyren Wilson (9)**	**13**
(Wales) Jamie Jones	5
28 & 29 April
(Scotland) **John Higgins (5)**	**13**
(England) Jack Lisowski	1
29 & 30 April
(England) Ricky Walden	9
(England) **Judd Trump (4)**	**13**
29 & 30 April
(China) **Ding Junhui (3)**	**13**
(Scotland) Anthony McGill (14)	4
26, 27 & 28 April
(China) Lyu Haotian	10
(England) **Barry Hawkins (6)**	**13**
28, 29 & 30 April
(Wales) **Mark Williams (7)**	**13**
(England) Robert Milkins	7
27 & 28 April
(England) **Ali Carter (15)**	**13**
(England) Ronnie O'Sullivan (2)	9

**Quarter-finals**; Best of 25 frames
1 & 2 May
(Northern Ireland) Mark Allen (16)	6
(England) **Kyren Wilson (9)**	**13**
1 & 2 May
(Scotland) **John Higgins (5)**	**13**
(England) Judd Trump (4)	12
1 & 2 May
(China) Ding Junhui (3)	5
(England) **Barry Hawkins (6)**	**13**
1 & 2 May
(Wales) **Mark Williams (7)**	**13**
(England) Ali Carter (15)	8

**Semi-finals**; Best of 33 frames
3, 4 & 5 May
(England) Kyren Wilson (9)	13
(Scotland) **John Higgins (5)**	**17**
3, 4 & 5 May
(England) Barry Hawkins (6)	15
(Wales) **Mark Williams (7)**	**17**

**Final**; Best of 35 frames
6 & 7 May
(Scotland) John Higgins (5)	16
(Wales) **Mark Williams (7)**	**18**

Final: (Best of 35 frames) Crucible Theatre, Sheffield, 6 & 7 May 2018; Referee: Brendan Moore
John Higgins (5); Scotland				16–**18**			**Mark Williams (7)**; Wales			
Session 1: 3–**5**
Frame	1	2	3	4	5	6	7	8	9	10
Higgins	23	15	35	60 (55)	**120**† (119)	0	**98**† (52)	**82**† (59)	N/A	N/A
Williams	**75**†	**65**†	**72**†	**70**†	4	**133**† (95)	0	21	N/A	N/A
Session 2: 4–**5** (7–**10**)
Frame	1	2	3	4	5	6	7	8	9	10
Higgins	46	**75**† (51)	**127**† (127)	12	**85**† (56)	**123**† (117)	0	35	43	N/A
Williams	**81**† (72)	31	8	**76**†	9	15	**123**† (118)	**64**† (64)	**80**†	N/A
Session 3: 3–**5** (10–**15**)
Frame	1	2	3	4	5	6	7	8	9	10
Higgins	5	19	0	7	**92**† (67)	**76**† (72)	**80**† (80)	8	N/A	N/A
Williams	**98**† (61)	**73**† (56)	**126**† (69, 56)	**63**† (52)	29	65 (65)	0	**84**†	N/A	N/A
Session 4: **6**–3 (16–**18**)
Frame	1	2	3	4	5	6	7	8	9	10
Higgins	**131**† (131)	**68**† (68)	**82**† (82)	**91**†	**67**† (62)	0	15	**65**† (65)	0	N/A
Williams	1	58 (58)	47	0	47	**74**†	**104**† (100)	63 (63)	**71**† (69)	N/A
**131**				Highest break			118			
**4**				Century breaks			2			
**16**				50+ breaks			14			
(Wales) **Mark Williams** wins the 2018 Betfred World Snooker Championship. † = Winner of frame

== Qualifying ==
There were 128 players in the qualifying competition. The qualifying event was played in three rounds, with the 16 winners of the third round matches progressing to the main stages of the tournament at the Crucible Theatre in Sheffield. Qualifying took place between 11 and 18 April 2018 at the English Institute of Sport, also in Sheffield, in a 12-table setup. All matches were best of 19 frames.

A total of 113 tour players (ranked outside the top 16, including Invitational Tour Card holders Ken Doherty and Jimmy White) were joined by 15 amateur players who had achieved success through the World Professional Billiards and Snooker Association (WPBSA) qualifying criteria. Among the 131 World Snooker Tour players, only Boonyarit Keattikun and Kritsanut Lertsattayathorn (both from Thailand) did not participate in the qualifying rounds or the main draw. Players ranked 17–80 in the world rankings were seeded in qualifying. The following 15 amateur players were invited to compete in qualifying:

- 2018 WSF Championship semi-finalists: ~~Luo Honghao~~, (Note: Luo Honghao could not obtain a visa in time to compete.) Adam Stefanów, Kristján Helgason, Kacper Filipiak
- 2018 WSF Seniors Championship winner: Igor Figueiredo
- 2018 WLBS World Women's Championship winner: Ng On-yee
- 2018 EBSA European Championship finalists: Harvey Chandler, Jordan Brown
- 2018 EBSA European Under-21 Championship runner-up: Tyler Rees
- 2018 EBSA European Under-18 Championship winner: Jackson Page
- EBSA Order of Merit 2017/18: Jamie Cope
- 2018 World Seniors Championship winner: Aaron Canavan
- WLBS World Ranking No.2: Reanne Evans
- 2018 OBSF Oceania Championship winner: Adrian Ridley
- WPBSA Development invitations: Ryan Thomerson, Marvin Lim

Round 1 Best of 19 frames			Round 2 Best of 19 frames			Round 3 Best of 19 frames
1	Ryan Day (WAL)	10
	Igor Figueiredo (BRA)	2	1	(Wales) Ryan Day	10
64	Mitchell Mann (ENG)	10	64	(England) Mitchell Mann	1 (Note: Mitchell Mann conceded the match due to illness at 1–7.)
	Peter Lines (ENG)	5				1	(Wales) Ryan Day	10
32	Robbie Williams (ENG)	10				33	(England) Peter Ebdon	6
	Jak Jones (WAL)	8	32	(England) Robbie Williams	5
33	Peter Ebdon (ENG)	10	33	(England) Peter Ebdon	10
	James Wattana (THA)	4
16	Zhou Yuelong (CHN)	10
	Ian Preece (WAL)	1	16	(China) Zhou Yuelong	8
49	Daniel Wells (WAL)	10	49	(Wales) Daniel Wells	10
	Kurt Dunham (AUS)	6				49	(Wales) Daniel Wells	4
17	Tom Ford (ENG)	10				48	(England) Liam Highfield	10
	Leo Fernandez (IRL)	2	17	(England) Tom Ford	6
48	Liam Highfield (ENG)	10	48	(England) Liam Highfield	10
	Chen Zhe (CHN)	3
41	Matthew Selt (ENG)	10
	Ng On-yee (HKG)	1	41	(England) Matthew Selt	6
24	Mark Joyce (ENG)	4		(England) Adam Duffy	10
	Adam Duffy (ENG)	10					(England) Adam Duffy	1
56	Mei Xiwen (CHN)	10				9	(China) Xiao Guodong	10
	Basem Eltahhan (EGY)	8	56	(China) Mei Xiwen	4
9	Xiao Guodong (CHN)	10	9	(China) Xiao Guodong	10
	Chris Totten (SCO)	3
40	Stuart Carrington (ENG)	10
	Nigel Bond (ENG)	9	40	(England) Stuart Carrington	10
25	Ben Woollaston (ENG)	10	25	(England) Ben Woollaston	8
	Kacper Filipiak (POL)	5				40	(England) Stuart Carrington	10
57	Zhang Anda (CHN)	10				57	(China) Zhang Anda	8
	Zhang Yong (CHN)	6	57	(China) Zhang Anda	10
8	Martin Gould (ENG)	10	8	(England) Martin Gould	4
	Paul Davison (ENG)	4
5	Graeme Dott (SCO)	10
	Adrian Ridley (AUS)	1	5	(Scotland) Graeme Dott	10
60	Sunny Akani (THA)	10	60	(Thailand) Sunny Akani	2
	Lukas Kleckers (GER)	4				5	(Scotland) Graeme Dott	10
28	Dominic Dale (WAL)	10				37	(England) Mike Dunn	7
	Reanne Evans (ENG)	7	28	(Wales) Dominic Dale	3
37	Mike Dunn (ENG)	10	37	(England) Mike Dunn	10
	Duane Jones (WAL)	8
12	Michael Holt (ENG)	10
	Thor Chuan Leong (MYS)	7	12	(England) Michael Holt	10
53	Elliot Slessor (ENG)	10	53	(England) Elliot Slessor	7
	Eden Sharav (SCO)	7				12	(England) Michael Holt	3
21	Robert Milkins (ENG)	10				21	(England) Robert Milkins	10
	Aaron Canavan (JER)	1	21	(England) Robert Milkins	10
44	Scott Donaldson (SCO)	10	44	(Scotland) Scott Donaldson	8
	Tyler Rees (WAL)	5
45	Rory McLeod (ENG)	10
	Ian Burns (ENG)	8	45	(England) Rory McLeod	10
20	Li Hang (CHN)	10	20	(China) Li Hang	9
	Ashley Hugill (ENG)	9				45	(England) Rory McLeod	2
52	Lyu Haotian (CHN)	10				52	(China) Lyu Haotian	10
	Fang Xiongman (CHN)	8	52	(China) Lyu Haotian	10
13	Anthony Hamilton (ENG)	7		(England) Martin O'Donnell	9
	Martin O'Donnell (ENG)	10
36	Matthew Stevens (WAL)	10
	Ryan Thomerson (AUS)	5	36	(Wales) Matthew Stevens	10
29	Fergal O'Brien (IRL)	5		(China) Yuan Sijun	9
	Yuan Sijun (CHN)	10				36	(Wales) Matthew Stevens	10
61	Ken Doherty (IRL)	10				61	(Republic of Ireland) Ken Doherty	2
	Josh Boileau (IRL)	8	61	(Republic of Ireland) Ken Doherty	10
4	Mark King (ENG)	9		(Northern Ireland) Gerard Greene	4
	Gerard Greene (NIR)	10
3	Liang Wenbo (CHN)	10
	Rod Lawler (ENG)	2	3	(China) Liang Wenbo	10
62	Zhao Xintong (CHN)	10	62	(China) Zhao Xintong	5
	Aditya Mehta (IND)	8				3	(China) Liang Wenbo	0
30	Yu Delu (CHN)	10				35	(Wales) Jamie Jones	10
	Sean O'Sullivan (ENG)	8	30	(China) Yu Delu	7
35	Jamie Jones (WAL)	10	35	(Wales) Jamie Jones	10
	Craig Steadman (ENG)	5
14	Jack Lisowski (ENG)	10
	Christopher Keogan (ENG)	4	14	(England) Jack Lisowski	10
51	David Grace (ENG)	10	51	(England) David Grace	3
	Wang Yuchen (CHN)	6				14	(England) Jack Lisowski	10
19	Alan McManus (SCO)	10				19	(Scotland) Alan McManus	3
	Rhys Clark (SCO)	2	19	(Scotland) Alan McManus	10
46	Oliver Lines (ENG)	10	46	(England) Oliver Lines	9
	Harvey Chandler (ENG)	6
43	Andrew Higginson (ENG)	10
	David John (WAL)	4	43	(England) Andrew Higginson	10
22	Cao Yupeng (CHN)	7		(Finland) Robin Hull	5
	Robin Hull (FIN)	10				43	(England) Andrew Higginson	6
54	Lee Walker (WAL)	10				11	(England) Ricky Walden	10
	Kristján Helgason (ISL)	6	54	(Wales) Lee Walker	7
11	Ricky Walden (ENG)	10	11	(England) Ricky Walden	10
	Joe Swail (NIR)	8
38	Michael Georgiou (CYP)	10
	Matthew Bolton (AUS)	4	38	(Cyprus) Michael Georgiou	0
27	Mark Davis (ENG)	10	27	(England) Mark Davis	10
	Sanderson Lam (ENG)	1				27	(England) Mark Davis	7
59	Sam Craigie (ENG)	6				6	(England) Joe Perry	10
	Jimmy White (ENG)	10		(England) Jimmy White	5
6	Joe Perry (ENG)	10	6	(England) Joe Perry	10
	Ross Muir (SCO)	1
7	Yan Bingtao (CHN)	10
	Jackson Page (WAL)	7	7	(China) Yan Bingtao	9
58	Tian Pengfei (CHN)	10	58	(China) Tian Pengfei	10
	Li Yuan (CHN)	1				58	(China) Tian Pengfei	1
26	Kurt Maflin (NOR)	10				39	(England) Chris Wakelin	10
	Hamza Akbar (PAK)	7	26	(Norway) Kurt Maflin	4
39	Chris Wakelin (ENG)	10	39	(England) Chris Wakelin	10
	Xu Si (CHN)	4
10	David Gilbert (ENG)	10
	Billy Joe Castle (ENG)	8	10	(England) David Gilbert	9
55	Alfie Burden (ENG)	10	55	(England) Alfie Burden	10
	Jamie Curtis-Barrett (ENG)	6				55	(England) Alfie Burden	8
23	Gary Wilson (ENG)	8				42	(Thailand) Thepchaiya Un-Nooh	10
	Adam Stefanów (POL)	10		(Poland) Adam Stefanów	4
42	Thepchaiya Un-Nooh (THA)	10	42	(Thailand) Thepchaiya Un-Nooh	10
	Alexander Ursenbacher (SUI)	8
47	Sam Baird (ENG)	10
	Soheil Vahedi (IRN)	5	47	(England) Sam Baird	7
18	Jimmy Robertson (ENG)	10	18	(England) Jimmy Robertson	10
	Alex Borg (MLT)	2				18	(England) Jimmy Robertson	10
50	John Astley (ENG)	10				15	(Wales) Michael White	7
	Marvin Lim (SGP)	1	50	(England) John Astley	7
15	Michael White (WAL)	10	15	(Wales) Michael White	10
	Niu Zhuang (CHN)	9
34	Noppon Saengkham (THA)	10
	Chen Zifan (CHN)	1	34	(Thailand) Noppon Saengkham	5
31	Hossein Vafaei (IRN)	10	31	(Iran) Hossein Vafaei	10
	Jamie Cope (ENG)	8				31	(Iran) Hossein Vafaei	7
63	Hammad Miah (ENG)	10				2	(Scotland) Stephen Maguire	10
	Jordan Brown (NIR)	9	63	(England) Hammad Miah	4
2	Stephen Maguire (SCO)	10	2	(Scotland) Stephen Maguire	10
	Allan Taylor (ENG)	5

== Century breaks ==
=== Main stage centuries ===
A total of 84 century breaks were made by 21 players during the main stage of the World Championship.

- 146, 136, 134, 131, 127, 119, 117, 104, 101, 100, 100 – John Higgins
- 145, 141 – Ryan Day
- 141 – Chris Wakelin
- 140, 135, 118, 114, 113, 113, 110, 103, 102, 101, 100, 100 – Mark Williams
- 140, 126, 125, 124, 121, 106, 105 – Kyren Wilson
- 137, 102, 101 – Shaun Murphy
- 133, 132, 129, 129, 128, 124, 117, 113, 103 – Barry Hawkins
- 133, 122 – Mark Allen
- 128, 105 – Jack Lisowski
- 127, 125, 122, 100 – Lyu Haotian
- 126, 124, 113, 102, 102 – Ding Junhui
- 126, 115, 108, 106 – Ali Carter
- 124, 114 – Jamie Jones
- 123 – Stuart Bingham
- 122, 105 – Ricky Walden
- 121, 118, 110, 105 – Ronnie O'Sullivan
- 121, 112 – Thepchaiya Un-Nooh
- 120, 109, 103 – Joe Perry
- 120, 102 – Marco Fu
- 103, 103, 101, 100, 100 – Judd Trump
- 101 – Stephen Maguire

=== Qualifying stage centuries ===
A total of 111 century breaks – including a maximum break – were made by 53 players during the qualifying stage of the World Championship.

- 147, 140, 124, 124, 103 – Liang Wenbo
- 141, 119 – Jamie Cope
- 141, 100, 100 – Stuart Carrington
- 137, 105 – Xiao Guodong
- 136, 130, 116, 100 – Yan Bingtao
- 136, 120, 109 – Mark Davis
- 136, 117, 113, 109 – Lyu Haotian
- 136 – Michael Holt
- 135, 133, 125, 103, 102, 101, 100 – Ricky Walden
- 135 – Peter Ebdon
- 134, 122, 103 – Noppon Saengkham
- 133, 102 – Ken Doherty
- 132, 121, 117, 111, 111, 102 – Zhang Anda
- 131, 107, 107, 100 – Andrew Higginson
- 131, 100 – David Gilbert
- 130 – Dominic Dale
- 130 – Stephen Maguire
- 127, 126, 102 – Tian Pengfei
- 127, 114, 111, 102 – Liam Highfield
- 127 – Christopher Keogan
- 126 – Zhou Yuelong
- 125, 108 – Joe Perry
- 125, 104 – Chris Wakelin
- 122, 114, 111, 104, 100 – Jack Lisowski
- 120 – Robert Milkins
- 119 – Adam Duffy
- 118, 109 – Alan McManus
- 118 – Rory McLeod
- 118 – Hossein Vafaei
- 118 – Zhao Xintong
- 117 – Sunny Akani
- 114, 101 – Jamie Jones
- 114 – Zhang Yong
- 113 – Elliot Slessor
- 109, 105 – Thepchaiya Un-Nooh
- 109, 101 – Li Hang
- 109 – Mark Joyce
- 108, 104 – Gary Wilson
- 107, 100, 100 – Ryan Day
- 106 – John Astley
- 105, 104, 100 – Gerard Greene
- 105, 102 – Mark King
- 105 – David Grace
- 104, 101, 100 – Jimmy Robertson
- 104 – Sam Craigie
- 104 – Fergal O'Brien
- 104 – Daniel Wells
- 103, 100 – Matthew Stevens
- 102 – Leo Fernandez
- 101 – Cao Yupeng
- 101 – Chen Zhe
- 100 – Graeme Dott
- 100 – Mike Dunn

== Coverage ==
The tournament was broadcast live in the UK by BBC TV and BBC Online, as well as on Eurosport. The event was also broadcast by World Snooker internationally on Facebook, doing so for the second time. Coverage for the qualifying event was also broadcast on Facebook, and the Eurosport Player.
