= 2017–18 snooker world rankings =

Preceded by 2016–17	2017–18	Succeeded by 2018–19

2017–18 snooker world rankings: The professional world rankings for all the professional snooker players who qualified for the 2017‍–‍18 season are listed below. The rankings work as a two-year rolling list. The points for each tournament two years ago are removed when the corresponding tournament during the current season finishes. The following table contains the rankings which were used to determine the seedings for certain tournaments. Note that the list given below are just those rankings that are used for seeding tournaments. Other rankings are produced after each ranking event which are not noted here.

Name	Country	Seeding revision 0 (Note: Seeding revision 0 was used for the seeding of the Riga Masters and the China Championship.)		Seeding revision 1 (Note: Seeding revision 1 was used for the seeding of the Indian Open, the World Open and the European Masters.)		Seeding revision 2 (Note: Seeding revision 2 was used for the seeding of the International Championship.)		Seeding revision 3 (Note: Seeding revision 3 was used for the seeding of the Shanghai Masters.)		Seeding revision 4 (Note: Seeding revision 4 was used for the seeding of the English Open.)		Seeding revision 5 (Note: Seeding revision 5 was used for the seeding of the Northern Ireland Open and the UK Championship.)		Seeding revision 6 (Note: Seeding revision 6 was used for the seeding of the Scottish Open.)		Seeding revision 7 (Note: Seeding revision 7 was used for the seeding of the Masters and the German Masters.)		Seeding revision 8 (Note: Seeding revision 8 was used for the seeding of the China Open.)		Seeding revision 9 (Note: Seeding revision 9 was used for the seeding of the Welsh Open and the Gibraltar Open.)		Seeding revision 10 (Note: Seeding revision 10 was used for the seeding of the World Championship.)		Seeding revision 11	
Mark Selby	England	1	1,297,525	1	1,297,525	1	1,299,725	1	1,303,725	1	1,314,725	1	1,436,500	1	1,445,500	1	1,420,500	1	1,418,775	1	1,419,025	1	1,645,275	1	1,315,275
Ronnie O'Sullivan	England	14	298,750	14	298,750	10	316,750	10	316,750	12	316,750	7	390,750	4	544,250	2	714,250	2	724,250	2	722,750	2	900,250	2	905,750
Mark Williams	Wales	16	210,250	16	225,250	17	240,250	18	246,250	17	257,250	17	264,250	11	347,750	10	353,750	10	353,750	7	432,750	7	486,750	3	878,750
John Higgins	Scotland	2	563,000	2	563,000	2	581,600	3	585,600	3	588,300	4	490,800	5	524,575	5	519,575	5	539,050	5	537,550	5	604,525	4	751,525
Judd Trump	England	3	536,275	3	536,275	3	531,775	4	496,775	4	571,775	3	599,275	2	671,275	3	672,275	3	691,750	3	704,250	4	639,750	5	660,250
Ding Junhui	China	4	510,950	4	510,950	4	517,950	2	655,950	2	642,450	2	641,950	3	641,950	4	641,950	4	644,925	4	653,425	3	685,525	6	590,525
Barry Hawkins	England	6	376,500	6	377,500	7	383,975	7	387,975	7	387,975	10	384,475	8	396,475	7	402,475	7	402,475	8	404,725	6	491,225	7	543,225
Shaun Murphy	England	8	355,625	8	355,625	5	437,625	5	433,625	5	433,625	5	439,400	6	436,400	6	499,400	6	499,400	6	516,400	8	453,875	8	453,875
Kyren Wilson	England	13	301,400	11	305,400	13	304,400	15	294,400	15	296,400	13	327,375	15	326,475	14	327,475	14	329,250	14	314,250	9	364,250	9	416,250
Neil Robertson	Australia	7	358,125	7	359,125	8	363,125	8	375,125	8	381,125	9	387,125	10	390,625	20	250,625	15	320,625	13	322,625	10	356,125	10	356,125
Ali Carter	England	12	301,675	13	301,675	12	308,925	13	308,925	13	308,925	12	328,025	14	337,525	13	328,525	13	331,025	12	329,025	15	313,025	11	333,525
Mark Allen	Northern Ireland	10	305,925	10	305,925	11	315,925	9	328,425	10	339,425	6	397,700	9	393,450	8	399,450	8	399,450	9	400,450	16	311,950	12	332,450
Stuart Bingham	England	9	312,862	9	313,862	9	323,862	11	311,362	9	346,362	11	345,862	12	345,337	12	336,337	12	331,837	11	330,087	12	324,587	13	324,587
Anthony McGill	Scotland	17	199,250	18	205,250	18	234,250	16	252,250	16	263,250	16	279,350	17	282,325	15	283,325	16	285,300	16	283,800	14	314,800	14	320,300
Luca Brecel	Belgium	27	131,175	27	133,175	15	284,875	12	310,875	11	316,875	14	322,150	13	339,625	11	337,625	11	335,900	15	310,650	13	316,750	15	310,150
Ryan Day	Wales	19	194,087	15	244,087	16	250,562	17	249,562	18	251,562	18	247,537	19	248,537	16	279,537	17	278,637	17	281,137	17	299,112	16	303,862
Stephen Maguire	Scotland	24	177,375	19	202,375	21	205,850	20	212,850	20	212,850	20	220,450	20	234,950	18	257,950	18	267,425	19	259,925	18	273,025	17	291,025
Marco Fu	Hong Kong	5	393,625	5	393,625	6	399,725	6	406,725	6	405,425	8	387,400	7	399,400	9	389,400	9	376,650	10	373,650	11	348,150	18	282,150
Liang Wenbo	China	11	302,500	12	302,500	14	301,975	14	299,975	14	298,675	15	308,675	16	322,650	17	262,650	19	260,650	18	262,650	19	258,650	19	258,900
Joe Perry	England	22	181,175	22	187,175	24	186,150	23	198,150	23	202,150	23	192,250	22	204,350	22	222,850	22	225,350	21	232,850	22	210,450	20	237,950
Mark King	England	20	190,575	21	191,575	22	203,300	21	205,300	21	206,000	21	213,600	21	220,200	21	242,700	21	239,700	20	238,450	20	230,950	21	221,050
Graeme Dott	Scotland	30	123,375	30	123,375	29	138,475	28	142,475	29	146,475	31	137,950	30	149,950	28	160,950	28	160,425	23	196,425	21	214,425	22	219,175
Yan Bingtao	China	56	71,125	56	71,125	55	80,125	56	80,125	56	82,125	37	120,125	27	154,125	27	164,125	26	167,625	27	167,625	23	206,125	23	215,125
Martin Gould	England	15	210,975	17	210,975	20	206,075	22	201,075	22	203,075	19	231,075	18	248,550	19	251,050	20	251,050	24	196,050	24	185,050	24	194,050
Xiao Guodong	China	39	101,775	39	102,775	39	106,250	37	113,250	39	111,950	35	122,450	36	129,425	34	140,425	30	150,425	29	159,425	25	182,925	25	191,025
Jack Lisowski	England	54	73,637	54	77,637	58	75,212	57	77,212	55	83,212	44	99,187	35	133,162	38	129,162	38	129,162	38	131,662	30	163,262	26	180,862
David Gilbert	England	18	194,125	20	195,125	19	212,225	19	228,225	19	234,225	25	171,225	24	183,700	24	179,700	24	179,700	25	184,200	26	182,800	27	178,550
Ricky Walden	England	21	186,500	23	186,500	23	187,100	24	194,100	24	187,600	22	198,600	23	203,700	23	214,700	23	222,975	22	228,975	27	172,475	28	177,975
Michael White	Wales	26	134,100	26	135,100	26	153,075	26	153,075	28	153,075	27	150,550	26	157,025	26	167,025	27	164,025	28	163,025	31	162,125	29	175,625
Anthony Hamilton	England	25	142,925	25	142,925	27	151,925	27	151,925	27	153,925	26	153,925	28	153,925	29	153,925	29	153,925	30	157,925	29	166,425	30	166,425
Michael Holt	England	23	177,600	24	177,600	25	177,100	25	176,100	25	178,100	24	174,575	25	180,350	25	176,350	25	179,325	26	176,075	28	171,550	31	163,050
Tom Ford	England	33	113,500	33	114,500	32	130,225	32	128,225	32	127,425	32	133,900	34	139,500	37	132,500	35	137,600	36	143,600	33	157,375	32	159,775
Zhou Yuelong	China	31	118,325	31	119,325	29	137,800	30	137,300	26	154,000	28	142,000	29	150,600	31	146,600	31	149,575	32	148,075	32	160,350	33	159,450
Jimmy Robertson	England	38	105,487	38	106,487	35	110,762	33	122,762	34	119,262	38	118,737	37	127,512	35	133,512	37	136,012	34	144,512	34	140,487	34	148,587
Robert Milkins	England	34	108,575	35	110,575	36	110,575	38	111,575	41	108,075	34	124,175	33	140,275	33	141,275	34	143,775	35	144,275	37	133,775	35	148,025
Li Hang	China	58	68,075	58	68,075	46	100,675	36	115,675	37	114,875	33	124,975	38	127,475	36	133,475	36	136,450	37	134,950	36	134,050	36	136,450
Ben Woollaston	England	28	126,025	28	127,025	31	133,525	29	140,525	30	144,775	30	138,550	31	148,050	32	144,050	33	146,025	33	146,275	41	126,275	37	135,275
Cao Yupeng	China	89	6,525	90	7,525	87	13,525	77	25,525	70	43,025	69	49,525	68	56,525	67	61,525	56	91,525	51	97,525	38	132,525	38	132,525
Jamie Jones	Wales	35	108,462	36	109,462	44	103,437	44	101,437	44	103,437	45	98,412	47	104,887	48	100,887	47	102,487	46	104,987	51	100,087	39	127,587
Gary Wilson	England	57	68,337	57	69,337	57	76,337	55	80,337	57	79,937	57	85,912	53	95,012	54	91,012	54	92,987	50	98,487	39	131,487	40	124,887
Mark Davis	England	36	107,250	34	111,250	33	123,525	39	111,525	36	117,525	39	117,025	40	121,025	42	112,025	42	111,125	41	124,125	43	117,600	41	124,500
Mark Joyce	England	48	83,662	46	89,662	47	93,662	46	95,662	46	95,662	42	107,662	42	109,937	40	123,437	39	126,937	40	124,437	40	128,437	42	121,837
Yu Delu	China	47	84,175	49	84,175	48	88,775	48	92,775	48	92,775	54	89,250	48	98,750	49	99,750	48	101,725	48	104,225	46	108,225	43	117,225
Kurt Maflin	Norway	52	75,687	53	77,687	49	88,762	49	88,762	50	87,962	55	87,062	44	107,037	41	117,037	41	116,512	42	112,762	42	117,737	44	116,837
Hossein Vafaei	Iran	59	65,625	59	67,625	59	73,125	59	75,125	59	77,125	51	91,125	50	97,625	43	107,625	44	107,100	45	107,100	47	107,100	45	114,000
Dominic Dale	Wales	32	116,325	32	116,325	34	120,800	34	121,800	33	122,500	36	122,275	39	124,550	39	125,550	40	125,050	39	125,050	44	114,025	46	113,125
Matthew Stevens	Wales	55	71,887	55	72,887	54	84,987	53	86,987	52	86,987	56	86,487	55	92,987	52	92,987	54	92,987	55	94,487	52	99,487	47	107,587
Chris Wakelin	England	63	60,750	64	60,750	64	64,950	63	71,950	60	75,950	63	71,425	60	81,425	58	82,425	60	84,400	61	84,400	55	94,900	48	106,300
Michael Georgiou	Cyprus	74	23,237	72	24,237	72	29,237	70	33,237	71	37,237	72	37,237	73	43,737	72	48,737	73	48,737	59	84,737	54	96,737	49	105,737
Stuart Carrington	England	46	84,450	47	85,450	51	87,450	52	87,450	51	87,450	52	90,425	52	95,200	53	91,200	51	94,700	52	95,700	56	92,675	50	104,075
Fergal O'Brien	Ireland	45	91,537	45	91,537	37	108,137	41	108,137	40	108,137	43	100,612	45	105,887	46	101,887	49	100,987	49	102,487	45	109,587	51	102,987
Noppon Saengkham	Thailand	64	60,050	63	62,050	63	66,650	64	70,650	64	72,250	64	68,250	64	71,750	59	81,750	58	85,250	58	85,750	50	100,250	52	102,650
Mike Dunn	England	43	93,500	43	93,500	38	107,975	43	103,975	43	103,975	46	97,975	46	104,975	44	105,975	43	107,950	43	109,450	53	98,925	53	102,525
Andrew Higginson	England	49	78,675	48	84,675	53	85,875	54	86,875	53	86,875	50	91,150	56	90,250	50	95,250	53	93,525	57	94,025	59	89,025	54	102,525
Peter Ebdon	England	40	98,487	40	99,487	42	103,962	40	109,962	38	113,962	41	109,237	43	108,712	47	101,712	46	103,487	47	104,487	49	101,462	55	101,712
Thepchaiya Un-Nooh	Thailand	42	95,675	41	97,675	41	104,675	35	116,675	35	118,925	49	91,425	54	94,925	55	90,925	57	90,925	53	94,925	58	89,900	56	98,000
Robbie Williams	England	53	74,125	52	78,125	56	76,500	60	74,500	63	74,500	48	91,475	49	98,475	51	94,475	52	93,575	56	94,075	48	101,575	57	97,325
Scott Donaldson	Scotland	65	59,525	65	59,525	65	59,525	65	59,525	65	59,525	65	59,525	66	59,525	64	69,525	65	72,025	66	72,525	60	86,025	58	95,025
Matthew Selt	England	37	107,000	37	107,000	40	105,975	42	104,975	42	106,975	40	113,450	41	119,425	45	104,425	45	103,900	44	109,400	57	92,500	59	94,900
Liam Highfield	England	68	35,225	68	35,225	67	45,825	69	45,825	69	45,825	70	49,325	69	55,325	68	60,325	68	62,825	69	65,325	64	76,325	60	94,325
Lyu Haotian	China			104	0	119	0	119	0	108	4,000	105	6,500	82	30,500	74	45,500	74	45,500	75	46,000	68	66,500	61	94,000
Rory McLeod	England	41	95,962	42	95,962	43	103,462	45	100,462	45	100,462	58	85,712	57	89,712	56	89,712	50	95,712	54	94,712	61	82,487	62	89,387
Daniel Wells	Wales	61	63,512	62	63,512	62	68,362	58	75,362	61	75,362	61	73,337	63	75,612	63	71,612	64	74,212	65	74,212	65	75,712	63	89,212
Alan McManus	Scotland	29	125,850	29	126,850	28	141,325	31	135,325	31	139,325	29	140,325	32	146,425	30	147,425	32	149,400	31	150,400	35	139,400	64	86,900
Oliver Lines	England	62	63,062	60	65,062	61	68,562	62	72,562	62	74,562	60	75,537	62	77,137	61	78,137	63	76,412	63	76,412	62	80,912	65	83,312
John Astley	England	66	39,125	67	41,125	68	43,725	67	50,725	67	52,725	66	59,225	65	63,225	66	63,225	67	63,225	68	65,725	66	72,725	66	81,725
Zhang Anda	China	67	38,500	66	42,500	66	52,500	66	56,500	66	56,500	67	57,750	67	57,750	69	57,750	69	61,250	71	61,250	73	62,250	67	75,750
Elliot Slessor	England	85	9,362	86	10,362	76	24,362	74	28,362	77	28,362	82	28,362	72	48,362	73	48,362	72	54,362	72	55,362	69	66,362	68	75,362
Lee Walker	Wales	69	33,825	69	34,825	69	34,825	68	46,825	68	46,825	68	50,825	70	54,825	70	54,825	71	54,825	73	54,825	70	65,825	69	74,825
Tian Pengfei	China	50	77,575	51	79,575	52	86,675	51	87,675	54	86,375	62	71,875	59	81,875	62	77,875	62	76,975	64	74,975	74	60,575	70	74,075
David Grace	England	44	93,475	44	93,475	45	100,825	47	92,825	47	92,825	47	96,825	51	96,825	65	66,825	66	69,825	67	71,825	67	69,825	71	72,225
Alfie Burden	England	60	63,825	61	63,825	60	69,525	61	73,525	58	77,525	59	77,000	61	80,475	60	80,475	61	79,975	62	76,975	71	64,950	72	71,850
Mei Xiwen	China	70	32,212	70	32,212	70	32,212	71	32,212	72	34,212	71	38,212	71	53,712	71	53,712	70	56,212	70	61,712	72	62,712	73	71,712
Sam Baird	England	51	76,025	50	80,025	50	88,125	50	88,125	49	90,125	53	89,600	58	85,100	57	85,100	59	84,575	60	84,575	63	77,850	74	64,850
Ken Doherty	Ireland			83	15,000	75	26,000	72	30,000	73	34,000	74	34,000	75	37,500	77	42,500	78	42,500	79	44,500	77	47,500	75	61,000
Sunny Akani	Thailand			104	0	96	6,000	97	6,000	102	6,000	88	18,000	84	28,500	75	43,500	75	43,500	74	47,500	76	51,000	76	60,000
Zhao Xintong	China	72	23,537	73	23,537	73	27,262	75	27,262	75	29,262	73	35,762	74	38,262	76	43,262	76	43,262	76	45,262	78	47,262	77	56,262
Hammad Miah	England	71	25,837	71	27,837	71	29,837	73	29,837	74	29,837	75	33,337	79	33,337	79	38,337	79	40,837	77	44,837	79	45,837	78	54,837
Mitchell Mann	England	75	22,025	75	22,025	74	26,525	76	26,525	76	28,525	79	31,025	78	35,025	78	40,025	77	42,525	78	44,525	80	45,525	79	54,525
Sam Craigie	England	76	18,862	76	20,862	80	21,462	78	25,462	80	25,462	81	29,462	77	35,462	82	35,462	80	37,962	81	37,962	75	54,462	80	54,462
Martin O'Donnell	England			104	0	102	4,600	105	4,600	97	8,600	83	22,100	89	22,100	89	22,100	91	22,100	84	30,100	84	37,100	81	46,100
Jak Jones	Wales	77	18,862	77	18,862	81	19,462	82	19,462	82	21,462	84	21,462	86	23,962	85	28,962	85	28,962	86	29,462	81	43,962	82	43,962
Aditya Mehta	India	78	17,500	78	17,500	79	22,100	81	22,100	78	26,100	77	32,100	81	32,100	80	37,100	81	37,100	80	39,100	82	43,600	83	43,600
Ian Preece	Wales	79	17,000	79	17,000	77	23,600	79	23,600	79	25,600	77	32,100	76	36,100	81	36,100	82	36,100	82	36,600	83	39,100	84	39,100
Gerard Greene	Northern Ireland			103	1,000	99	5,000	101	5,000	95	9,000	98	11,500	92	18,500	93	18,500	92	22,000	90	24,000	90	27,500	85	36,500
James Wattana	Thailand	73	23,500	74	23,500	78	23,500	80	23,500	81	23,500	80	29,500	83	29,500	84	29,500	84	29,500	85	30,000	85	33,500	86	33,500
Adam Duffy	England	86	9,362	87	9,362	89	11,362	90	11,362	90	13,362	95	13,362	90	19,862	91	19,862	94	19,862	95	19,862	99	19,862	87	33,362
Alexander Ursenbacher	Switzerland			99	2,000	94	6,600	92	10,600	91	12,600	76	32,600	80	32,600	83	32,600	83	32,600	83	33,100	86	33,100	88	33,100
Craig Steadman	England	82	14,050	81	16,050	83	17,050	84	17,050	85	17,050	86	19,550	91	19,550	92	19,550	89	23,050	92	23,050	87	32,550	89	32,550
Fang Xiongman	China	80	15,550	82	15,550	84	16,150	85	16,150	84	18,150	85	20,650	87	23,150	87	23,150	87	25,650	89	25,650	88	32,150	90	32,150
Xu Si	China			104	0	85	15,000	86	15,000	86	15,000	91	15,000	97	15,000	90	20,000	86	26,000	88	26,000	89	29,500	91	29,500
Yuan Sijun	China			104	0	119	0	119	0	119	2,000	112	5,500	101	12,000	103	12,000	105	12,000	104	14,000	100	19,000	92	28,000
Jimmy White	England			93	4,000	103	4,000	106	4,000	108	4,000	117	4,000	114	7,500	101	12,500	99	15,000	99	17,500	101	18,500	93	27,500
Wang Yuchen	China	81	15,500	80	16,500	82	18,500	83	18,500	83	18,500	87	18,500	85	25,000	86	25,000	88	25,000	87	27,000	91	27,000	94	27,000
Ian Burns	England			104	0	92	7,000	91	11,000	93	11,000	91	15,000	97	15,000	99	15,000	99	15,000	100	17,000	91	27,000	94	27,000
Zhang Yong	China			104	0	119	0	119	0	119	2,000	94	14,000	95	16,500	97	16,500	95	19,000	93	23,000	91	27,000	94	27,000
Peter Lines	England			104	0	116	1,725	117	1,725	99	7,725	104	7,725	112	7,725	94	17,725	93	21,225	91	23,725	94	23,725	97	23,725
Li Yuan	China			104	0	119	0	119	0	119	2,000	101	8,500	88	22,500	88	22,500	90	22,500	94	22,500	95	22,500	98	22,500
Robin Hull	Finland			99	2,000	103	4,000	106	4,000	108	4,000	102	8,000	102	11,500	104	11,500	106	11,500	105	13,500	109	13,500	98	22,500
Allan Taylor	England			104	0	92	7,000	88	14,000	88	14,000	90	15,250	96	15,250	98	15,250	96	17,750	97	18,750	96	20,750	100	20,750
Thor Chuan Leong	Malaysia	84	11,900	85	11,900	88	11,900	89	11,900	89	13,900	89	17,400	93	17,400	95	17,400	97	17,400	96	19,400	97	20,400	101	20,400
Duane Jones	Wales			104	0	111	2,000	97	6,000	102	6,000	108	6,000	107	8,500	109	8,500	113	8,500	113	9,000	98	20,000	102	20,000
Alex Borg	Malta	83	13,000	84	14,000	86	14,600	87	14,600	87	14,600	93	14,600	94	17,100	96	17,100	98	17,100	98	18,100	102	18,100	103	18,100
Nigel Bond	England			99	2,000	108	2,600	110	2,600	116	2,600	122	2,600	123	2,600	124	2,600	124	2,600	120	6,600	103	17,600	104	17,600
Chen Zhe	China	93	3,500	96	3,500	106	3,500	93	10,500	92	12,500	96	12,500	100	12,500	101	12,500	104	12,500	108	12,500	104	17,500	105	17,500
Chen Zifan	China			103	1,000	99	5,000	101	5,000	95	9,000	96	12,500	97	15,000	99	15,000	99	15,000	102	15,000	104	17,500	105	17,500
Ashley Hugill	England			104	0	111	2,000	113	2,000	119	2,000	116	4,500	116	7,000	116	7,000	103	13,000	101	16,000	106	16,000	107	16,000
Niu Zhuang	China			104	0	111	2,000	113	2,000	119	2,000	108	6,000	107	8,500	109	8,500	107	11,000	102	15,000	106	16,000	107	16,000
Chris Totten	Scotland			104	0	119	0	119	0	125	0	127	0	120	4,000	121	4,000	118	7,500	112	9,500	108	14,500	109	14,500
Eden Sharav	Scotland			103	1,000	117	1,000	101	5,000	100	7,000	99	11,000	103	11,000	105	11,000	102	13,500	105	13,500	109	13,500	110	13,500
Josh Boileau	Ireland	87	8,312	88	8,312	90	10,312	94	10,312	94	10,312	100	10,312	105	10,312	107	10,312	109	10,312	107	12,812	111	12,812	111	12,812
Paul Davison	England			93	4,000	99	5,000	101	5,000	107	5,000	115	5,000	114	7,500	115	7,500	118	7,500	119	7,500	112	12,500	112	12,500
Soheil Vahedi	Iran			104	0	111	2,000	113	2,000	108	4,000	117	4,000	109	8,000	111	8,000	114	8,000	116	8,000	112	12,500	112	12,500
Billy Joe Castle	England			104	0	119	0	119	0	102	6,000	108	6,000	104	10,500	106	10,500	108	10,500	109	11,500	114	11,500	114	11,500
Jamie Curtis-Barrett	England	92	3,500	92	4,500	98	5,100	100	5,100	106	5,100	114	5,100	113	7,600	114	7,600	110	10,100	110	10,100	115	11,100	115	11,100
Hamza Akbar	Pakistan			104	0	119	0	119	0	125	0	127	0	128	0	129	0	126	2,500	124	5,500	116	10,500	116	10,500
Kurt Dunham	Australia	94	3,025	97	3,025	107	3,025	109	3,025	114	3,025	121	3,025	122	3,025	123	3,025	121	5,525	121	6,525	117	10,025	117	10,025
Ross Muir	Scotland			104	0	119	0	119	0	108	4,000	105	6,500	106	10,000	108	10,000	111	10,000	111	10,000	118	10,000	118	10,000
Christopher Keogan	England	90	5,050	91	6,050	95	6,050	96	6,050	101	6,050	107	6,050	117	6,050	117	6,050	112	8,550	114	8,550	119	8,550	119	8,550
Joe Swail	Northern Ireland			104	0	117	1,000	118	1,000	115	3,000	112	5,500	119	5,500	119	5,500	114	8,000	115	8,500	120	8,500	120	8,500
Sanderson Lam	England			104	0	119	0	119	0	125	0	117	4,000	109	8,000	111	8,000	114	8,000	116	8,000	121	8,000	121	8,000
Kritsanut Lertsattayathorn	Thailand	88	8,000	89	8,000	91	8,000	95	8,000	98	8,000	102	8,000	109	8,000	111	8,000	114	8,000	116	8,000	121	8,000	121	8,000
Boonyarit Keattikun	Thailand	91	4,000	93	4,000	96	6,000	97	6,000	102	6,000	108	6,000	118	6,000	118	6,000	120	6,000	122	6,000	123	6,000	123	6,000
Sean O'Sullivan	England			104	0	103	4,000	106	4,000	108	4,000	117	4,000	120	4,000	121	4,000	123	4,000	125	5,000	123	6,000	123	6,000
Rod Lawler	England			104	0	108	2,600	110	2,600	116	2,600	122	2,600	123	2,600	124	2,600	124	2,600	123	5,600	125	5,600	125	5,600
Leo Fernandez	Ireland			104	0	119	0	119	0	125	0	127	0	128	0	120	5,000	122	5,000	125	5,000	126	5,000	126	5,000
Rhys Clark	Scotland			104	0	119	0	119	0	125	0	124	2,500	125	2,500	126	2,500	126	2,500	127	2,500	127	2,500	127	2,500
David John	Wales	95	2,337	98	2,337	110	2,337	112	2,337	118	2,337	125	2,337	126	2,337	127	2,337	128	2,337	128	2,337	128	2,337	128	2,337
Lukas Kleckers	Germany			99	2,000	111	2,000	113	2,000	119	2,000	126	2,000	127	2,000	128	2,000	129	2,000	129	2,000	129	2,000	129	2,000
Basem Eltahhan	Egypt			104	0	119	0	119	0	125	0	127	0	128	0	129	0	130	0	130	500	130	500	130	500
Matthew Bolton	Australia			104	0	119	0	119	0	125	0	127	0	128	0	129	0	130	0	131	0	131	0	131	0

Sources: World Rankings and Full Calendar (worldsnooker.com)
