= Siyavosh Mozayani =

Iranian snooker player

Personal information
- Full name: Siyavosh Mozayani
- Nationality: Iranian
- Born: 23 March 1995 (age 29); Tehran, Tehran, Iran
- Height: 175 cm (5 ft 9 in)
- Weight: 74 kg (163 lb)

Sport
- Country: Iran
- Sport: Snooker

Siyavosh Mozayani (Persian: سیاوش مزینی; born 23 March 1995) is an Iranian snooker player.

He started his career in snooker at the age of 9, and at the age of 13, he was able to win the championship of the youth tournament and got the quota to be in the national team. He has the experience of working with coaches such as Manoj Kothari from India, Nick Barrow from England, David Roe from England and PJ Nolan from Ireland.

Mozayani, who is still a member of the Iranian national snooker team, has been able to win the championship title in the Asian tournament during his 8 years in this team.

== Career finals ==
=== Amateur finals: 2 (1 title) ===
Outcome	No.	Year	Championship	Opponent in the final	Score
Runner-up	1.	2014	Asian Under-21 Championship	(Thailand) Thanawat Thirapongpaiboon	8–9
Winner	1.	2022	Asian 6-Reds Championship	(Iran) Amir Sarkhosh	5–4

== Honors ==
- 5th place in IBSF World Under-21 Snooker Championship (2013 China)
- 5th place in 2019 World Cup snooker
- Bronze medal of the West Asian Championship Snooker Tournament
