= Thanawat Tirapongpaiboon =

Thai snooker player (born 1993)

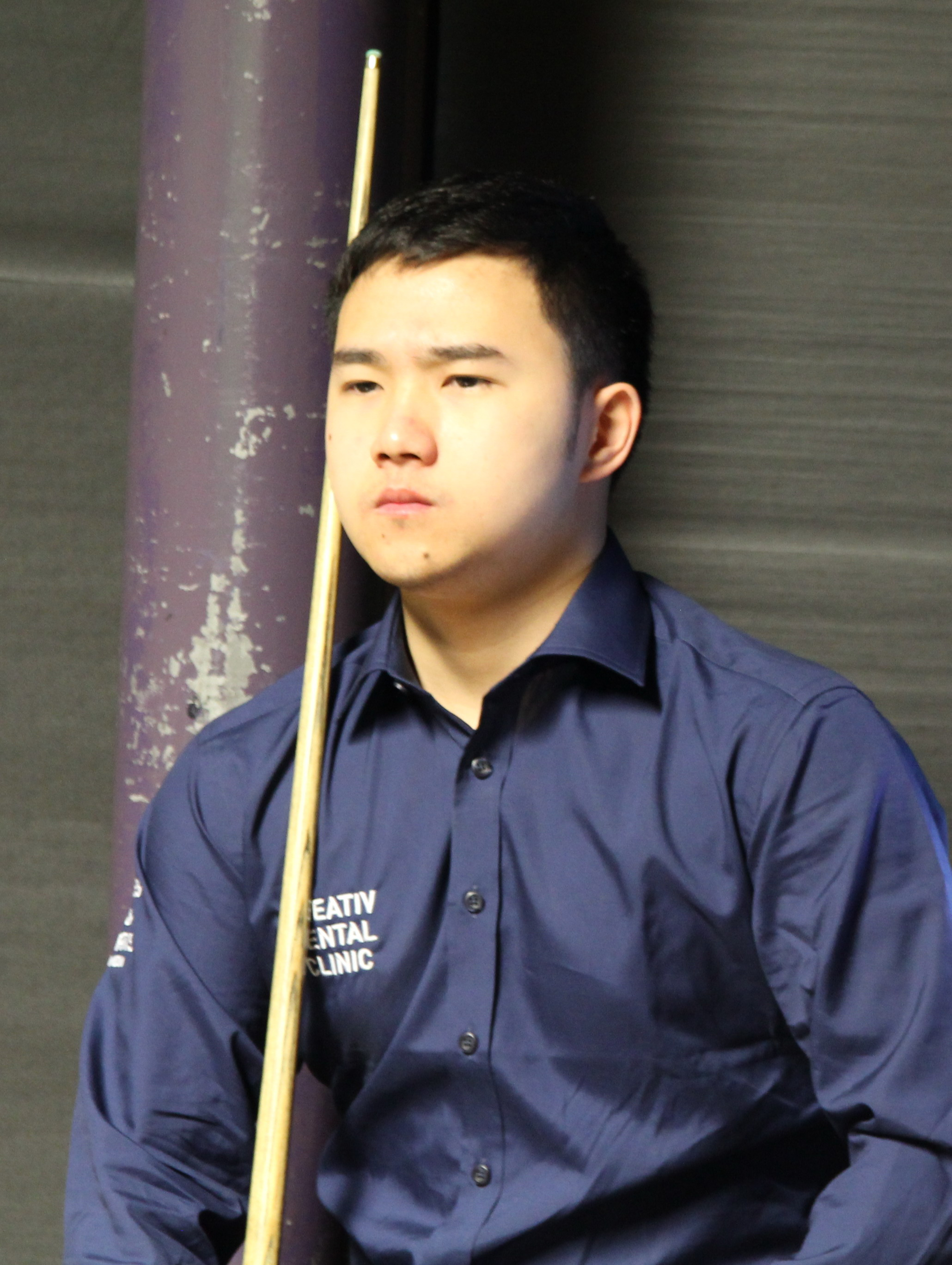
- Tirapongpaiboon at the Paul Hunter Classic in 2015

Personal information
- Born: 14 December 1993 (age 32) Pattaya, Thailand

Sport
- Country: Thailand
- Sport: Snooker
- Professional: 2010–2016, 2026–present
- Highest ranking: 67 (September 2012)
- Current ranking: 95 (as of 7 November 2026)
- Maximum breaks: 1
- Best ranking finish: Last 32 (x2)
Medal record
Men's snooker
Representing Thailand
Southeast Asian Games
Bronze medal – third place	2011 Palembang	Doubles

Thanawat Tirapongpaiboon (Note: Both the professional tour and the sport's governing body spell his name Thanawat Tirapongpaiboon.) (Thai: ธนวัฒน์ ถิรพงศ์ไพบูลย์; born December 14, 1993) is a Thai professional snooker player. He turned professional in 2010 as the Asian nomination following his run to the semi-finals of the 2010 Asian Championship. He was the youngest player competing on the main tour for the 2010–11 season at the age of 17, and the youngest snooker player to have made an official maximum break in professional competition at the 2010 Rhein–Main Masters aged 16 years and 312 days.

Following an investigation by the sport's governing body, Tirapongpaiboon admitted fixing the outcome of six professional matches between 2013 and 2015, and was therefore suspended unconditionally for three years from 2022 to 2025. After ten years since his previous appearance on the main tour, he was awarded a tour card for the 2026–27 and 2027–28 seasons in May 2026 after winning the Asia-Oceania Q School that year.

== Career ==
=== 2010–2011 season ===
In his very first professional tournament, the Shanghai Masters Tirapongpaiboon made an impact by beating Justin Astley 5–3, Mark Joyce 5–4 and Nigel Bond 5–1 before losing 4–5 to Mark Davis, just one frame away from reaching the final stages in Shanghai.

Tirapongpaiboon made the 74th official maximum break during his third round match against Barry Hawkins at Euro Players Tour Championship 2010/2011 – Event 3, but lost the match 1–4. With this he became the youngest player ever to make an official maximum break at the age of 16 years and 312 days. Nevertheless, he fell off the tour after one year. In July 2011 he won the IBSF World Under-21 Snooker Championship by defeating Noppon Saengkham 9–3 in the final and in doing so earned a place back on the main snooker tour for the 2012–13 season.

=== 2012–2013 season ===
Tirapongpaiboon came through three qualifying matches, before losing in the final round in both the Australian Goldfields Open and the Shanghai Masters, losing to Liang Wenbo and in a last frame decide to Jamie Cope respectively. This was the closest he came to reaching the main of a ranking event. He had a very good season in the minor-ranking Players Tour Championship events, reaching the quarter-finals in the fifth and sixth European Tour events. In the fifth event he beat compatriot Thepchaiya Un-Nooh, Liu Chuang and top 16 player Barry Hawkins, before losing 3–4 to Anthony McGill, and in the sixth event he beat the likes of Fergal O'Brien, Ricky Walden and Liang Wenbo, before being whitewashed 0–4 by Mark Selby. He also reached the last 16 of another event to finish 38th on the PTC Order of Merit. Thirapongpaiboon defeated Jamie O'Neill 10–8 and Mike Dunn 10–6 in World Championship Qualifying, but his season was ended in the next round when he lost 8–10 to Matthew Selt. He finished the year ranked world number 71.

=== 2013–2014 season ===
After Tirapongpaiboon's 5–0 loss to Ross Muir in the first round of Shanghai Masters qualifiers it was announced by World Snooker that the match was being investigated due to unusual betting patterns. However, the governing body concluded the case in January 2014 finding no link between the player and suspicious betting activity. The only ranking event Thirapongpaiboon qualified for this season was the Indian Open where he beat Lü Haotian 4–1, before losing 4–2 to Stuart Bingham in the second round. Thirapongpaiboon was relegated from the tour at the end of the season as he was ranked world number 87, outside of the top 64 who remain.

In June 2014, he won the ACBS Asian Under-21 Snooker Championship by defeating Siyavosh Mozayani 6–1 in the final and earned a two-year tour card for the 2014–15 and 2015–16 seasons.

=== 2014–2015 season ===
Tirapongpaiboon did not play his first match of the season until the opening round of the UK Championship, where he was thrashed 6–0 by Stuart Bingham. His first win of the year came courtesy of a 4–0 whitewash over Jimmy Robertson to qualify for the Indian Open, where he lost 4–1 to compatriot Dechawat Poomjaeng in the first round. Thirapongpaiboon's limited season ended with a 10–6 loss to Robertson in the second round of World Championship qualifying after he had seen off Kyren Wilson 10–3 in the first.

=== 2015–2016 season ===
Tirapongpaiboon once again played a select few events during the 2015–16 season and could only win two matches, which came at the Haining Open. He has not played on the main snooker tour since December 2015 and was relegated from it at the end of the season.

=== 2022–present ===
Tirapongpaiboon took part in the inaugural edition of the Q School Asia & Oceania event after the conclusion of the 2021-22 snooker season. He entered in Event 1 and reached the semi-finals, where he beat fellow Thai Dechawat Poomjaeng. Despite having been eligible to receive a two-year tour card for doing so, on 22 June 2022, the WPBSA and World Snooker Tour declined to offer him a tour card, citing "serious disciplinary matters from when Thanawat was previously a professional player in 2015" as the reason. On 1 September, 2022 the WPBSA announced they were charging him with fixing the outcome of 6 World Snooker Tour matches between 2013 and 2015. He was suspended unconditionally from 15 June 2022 until 14 March 2025, with his return to the sport conditional on continued assistance with the governing body's anti-corruption work.

In May 2025, he entered the Asia-Oceania Q School where he was defeated by recent professional Xing Zihao.

== Performance and rankings timeline ==
Tournament	2010/ 11	2011/ 12	2012/ 13	2013/ 14	2014/ 15	2015/ 16	2018/ 19	2026/ 27
Ranking (Note: It shows the ranking at the beginning of the season)	(Note: New players on the Main Tour don't have a ranking)	(Note: He was an amateur)		71	(Note: Players qualified through ACBS Asian Under-21 Snooker Championship started the season without prize money ranking points)	103		(Note: Players qualified through Q School started the season without ranking points)
Ranking tournaments
Championship League	Non-Ranking Event							RR
China Open	LQ	A	LQ	LQ	LQ	A	A	LQ
Wuhan Open	Tournament Not Held							LQ
British Open	Tournament Not Held							2R
English Open	Tournament Not Held						A	1R
Shenzhen Open	Tournament Not Held							LQ
Northern Ireland Open	Tournament Not Held						A	1R
International Championship	Not Held		LQ	LQ	A	LQ	A	LQ
UK Championship	LQ	A	LQ	1R	1R	1R	A	
Shoot Out	Non-Ranking Event						A	
Scottish Open	Tournament Not Held						A	LQ
German Masters	1R	A	LQ	LQ	LQ	LQ	A	
Welsh Open	LQ	A	LQ	1R	1R	A	A	
World Grand Prix	Tournament Not Held				NR	DNQ	DNQ	
Players Championship (Note: The event was called the Players Tour Championship Grand Finals (2010/2011–2012/2013))	DNQ	DNQ	DNQ	DNQ	A	DNQ	DNQ	
World Open (Note: The event was called the World Open (2010/2011) and the Haikou World Open (2011/2012–2013/2014))	LQ	WR	LQ	LQ	Not Held		A	
Tour Championship	Tournament Not Held						DNQ	
World Championship	LQ	A	LQ	LQ	LQ	A	A	
Former ranking tournaments
Wuxi Classic	Non-Ranking		LQ	LQ	A	Not Held		
Australian Goldfields Open	NH	A	LQ	LQ	A	A	Not Held	
Shanghai Masters	LQ	WR	LQ	LQ	WD	LQ	Non-Ranking	
Indian Open	Not Held			2R	1R	NH	A	NH
Former non-ranking tournaments
Six-red World Championship	RR	NH	3R	RR	RR	2R	RR	NH

Performance Table Legend
LQ	lost in the qualifying draw	#R	lost in the early rounds of the tournament (WR = Wildcard round, RR = Round robin)	QF	lost in the quarter-finals
SF	lost in the semi-finals	F	lost in the final	W	won the tournament
DNQ	did not qualify for the tournament	A	did not participate in the tournament	WD	withdrew from the tournament

NH / Not Held	means an event was not held.
NR / Non-Ranking Event	means an event is/was no longer a ranking event.
R / Ranking Event	means an event is/was a ranking event.
MR / Minor-Ranking Event	means an event is/was a minor-ranking event.

== Career finals ==
=== Amateur finals: 4 (2 titles) ===
Outcome	No.	Year	Championship	Opponent in the final	Score
Runner-up	1.	2010	Asian Under-21 Championship	(China) Liu Chuang	5–6
Winner	1.	2011	World Under-21 Snooker Championship	(Thailand) Noppon Saengkham	9–3
Winner	2.	2014	Asian Under-21 Championship	(Iran) Siyavosh Mozayani	6–1
Runner-up	2.	2019	Asian Amateur Championship	(India) Pankaj Advani	3–6
