= Euro Players Tour Championship 2010/2011 – Event 3 =

Euro Players Tour Championship 2010/2011 Event 3
Tournament information
- Dates: 22–24 October 2010
- Venue: Walter Kobel Sporthalle
- City: Rüsselsheim
- Country: Germany
- Organisation: World Snooker
- Format: Minor-ranking event
- Total prize fund: €50,000
- Winner's share: €10,000
- Highest break: Mark Williams (WAL) (147); Thanawat Thirapongpaiboon (THA) (147)

Final
- Champion: Marcus Campbell (SCO)
- Runner-up: Liang Wenbo (CHN)
- Score: 4–0

The Euro Players Tour Championship 2010/2011 – Event 3 (also known as the 2010 Rhein–Main Masters and the 2010 Russelsheim Cup) was a professional minor-ranking snooker tournament that took place between 22–24 October 2010 at the Walter Kobel Sporthalle in Rüsselsheim, Germany.

Thanawat Thirapongpaiboon made the 74th official maximum break during his last 32 match against Barry Hawkins. At the age of 16 years and 312 days, he became the youngest player to have made an officially recognised maximum break in professional competition. Mark Williams made the 75th official maximum break during his last 128 match against Diana Schuler. This was Williams' second 147 break.

Marcus Campbell won in the final 4–0 against Liang Wenbo.

== Prize fund and ranking points ==
The breakdown of prize money and ranking points of the event is shown below:

	Prize fund	Ranking points^{1}
Winner	€10,000	2,000
Runner-up	€5,000	1,600
Semi-finalist	€2,500	1,280
Quarter-finalist	€1,400	1,000
Last 16	€1,000	760
Last 32	€500	560
Last 64	€200	360
Plate winner^{2}	€1,500	–
Plate runner-up^{2}	€500	–
Total	€50,000	–

- ^{1} Only professional players can earn ranking points.
- ^{2} Prize money earned from the Plate competition does not qualify for inclusion in the Order of Merit.

== Main draw ==
=== Top half ===
==== Section 1 ====
Last 128; Best of 7 frames
(England) Barry Pinches	w/o
(Scotland) Jamie Burnett	w/d
(England) Ricky Walden	4
(England) Michael Holt	2
(England) Ronnie O'Sullivan	w/d
(England) Kuldesh Johal	w/o
(Wales) Andrew Pagett	4
(Netherlands) Mario Wehrmann	1
(England) Barry Hawkins	4
(Scotland) Stephen Hendry	2
(Belgium) Bjorn Haneveer	4
(England) Ian Glover	3
(England) Justin Astley	3
(Thailand) Thanawat Thirapongpaiboon	4
(England) Jack Lisowski	1
(England) Jamie Walker	4

Last 64; Best of 7 frames
(England) Barry Pinches	1
(England) Ricky Walden	4
(England) Kuldesh Johal	2
(Wales) Andrew Pagett	4
(England) Barry Hawkins	4
(Belgium) Bjorn Haneveer	3
(Thailand) Thanawat Thirapongpaiboon	4
(England) Jamie Walker	1

Last 32; Best of 7 frames
(England) Ricky Walden	4
(Wales) Andrew Pagett	1
(England) Barry Hawkins	4
(Thailand) Thanawat Thirapongpaiboon	1

Last 16; Best of 7 frames
(England) Ricky Walden	2
(England) Barry Hawkins	4

==== Section 2 ====
Last 128; Best of 7 frames
(England) Martin Gould	4
(Republic of Ireland) Philip Arnold	1
(China) Liu Song	4
(England) Adam Wicheard	3
(Wales) Jamie Jones	4
(Germany) Ronni Beniesch	0
(England) Joe Perry	w/d
(Germany) Ralph Enax	w/o
(England) Jamie Cope	w/o
(Republic of Ireland) Michael Judge	w/d
(England) Ben Woollaston	4
(Germany) Phil Barnes	0
(Brazil) Igor Figueiredo	2
(Republic of Ireland) Ken Doherty	4
(England) Mark Davis	2
(China) Zhang Anda	4

Last 64; Best of 7 frames
(England) Martin Gould	4
(China) Liu Song	1
(Wales) Jamie Jones	4
(Germany) Ralph Enax	0
(England) Jamie Cope	4
(England) Ben Woollaston	0
(Republic of Ireland) Ken Doherty	4
(China) Zhang Anda	2

Last 32; Best of 7 frames
(England) Martin Gould	2
(Wales) Jamie Jones	4
(England) Jamie Cope	1
(Republic of Ireland) Ken Doherty	4

Last 16; Best of 7 frames
(Wales) Jamie Jones	3
(Republic of Ireland) Ken Doherty	4

==== Section 3 ====
Last 128; Best of 7 frames
(England) Matthew Selt	4
(England) Martin O'Donnell	2
(England) Matthew Couch	1
(Wales) Jak Jones	4
(England) Nigel Bond	4
(New Zealand) Chris McBreen	0
(England) Robert Milkins	4
(Germany) Joern Hannes-Hühn	1
(China) Xiao Guodong	4
(Scotland) Marc Davis	2
(England) Kyren Wilson	w/o
(Germany) Stefan Joachim	w/d
(England) Mark Joyce	4
(Turkey) Soner Sari	0
(Scotland) Marcus Campbell	4
(France) Stéphane Ochoiski	1

Last 64; Best of 7 frames
(England) Matthew Selt	3
(Wales) Jak Jones	4
(England) Nigel Bond	2
(England) Robert Milkins	4
(China) Xiao Guodong	3
(England) Kyren Wilson	4
(England) Mark Joyce	1
(Scotland) Marcus Campbell	4

Last 32; Best of 7 frames
(Wales) Jak Jones	1
(England) Robert Milkins	4
(England) Kyren Wilson	2
(Scotland) Marcus Campbell	4

Last 16; Best of 7 frames
(England) Robert Milkins	1
(Scotland) Marcus Campbell	4

==== Section 4 ====
Last 128; Best of 7 frames
(England) Adrian Gunnell	4
(Netherlands) Maurice Le Duc	0
(England) Stuart Bingham	4
(Northern Ireland) Joe Swail	2
(England) Mark King	4
(Germany) Stefan Gerst	0
(England) Ian McCulloch	4
(Croatia) Sanjin Kusan	1
(England) Anthony Hamilton	w/o
(Germany) Nico Steiner	w/d
(England) Allan Taylor	2
(Thailand) James Wattana	4
(England) Judd Trump	4
(Thailand) Noppon Saengkham	1
(England) Dave Harold	w/d
(Republic of Ireland) David Morris	w/o

Last 64; Best of 7 frames
(England) Adrian Gunnell	3
(England) Stuart Bingham	4
(England) Mark King	4
(England) Ian McCulloch	2
(England) Anthony Hamilton	3
(Thailand) James Wattana	4
(England) Judd Trump	4
(Republic of Ireland) David Morris	1

Last 32; Best of 7 frames
(England) Stuart Bingham	4
(England) Mark King	3
(Thailand) James Wattana	2
(England) Judd Trump	4

Last 16; Best of 7 frames
(England) Stuart Bingham	3
(England) Judd Trump	4

=== Bottom half ===
==== Section 5 ====
Last 128; Best of 7 frames
(England) Mark Selby	4
(England) Christopher Henry	0
(England) Stephen Lee	0
(Thailand) Issara Kachaiwong	4
(England) Paul Davison	w/o
(Germany) Thomas Wacker	w/d
(England) Jimmy Robertson	4
(Scotland) James McBain	1
(Scotland) Stephen Maguire	w/o
(Republic of Ireland) Joe Delaney	w/d
(England) Peter Lines	4
(Germany) Uli Ottner	0
(England) Michael Wasley	4
(Germany) Jörg Ebert	0
(England) Alfie Burden	4
(Wales) Ryan Day	3

Last 64; Best of 7 frames
(England) Mark Selby	4
(Thailand) Issara Kachaiwong	0
(England) Paul Davison	3
(England) Jimmy Robertson	4
(Scotland) Stephen Maguire	4
(England) Peter Lines	2
(England) Michael Wasley	4
(England) Alfie Burden	2

Last 32; Best of 7 frames
(England) Mark Selby	4
(England) Jimmy Robertson	0
(Scotland) Stephen Maguire	4
(England) Michael Wasley	0

Last 16; Best of 7 frames
(England) Mark Selby	4
(Scotland) Stephen Maguire	3

==== Section 6 ====
Last 128; Best of 7 frames
(England) Peter Ebdon	4
(Norway) Kurt Maflin	0
(England) Shaun Murphy	4
(Belgium) Tomasz Skalski	2
(Malta) Tony Drago	4
(Germany) Patrick Einsle	1
(England) Jimmy White	3
(Germany) Lasse Münstermann	4
(Australia) Neil Robertson	4
(England) Rod Lawler	3
(Wales) Matthew Stevens	w/o
(England) Ali Carter	w/d
(China) Ding Junhui	w/o
(Northern Ireland) Mark Allen	w/d
(China) Liang Wenbo	4
(China) Chen Zhe	2

Last 64; Best of 7 frames
(England) Peter Ebdon	4
(England) Shaun Murphy	3
(Malta) Tony Drago	4
(Germany) Lasse Münstermann	1
(Australia) Neil Robertson	1
(Wales) Matthew Stevens^{[a]}	0
(China) Ding Junhui	0
(China) Liang Wenbo	4

Last 32; Best of 7 frames
(England) Peter Ebdon	4
(Malta) Tony Drago	2
(Australia) Neil Robertson	1
(China) Liang Wenbo	4

Last 16; Best of 7 frames
(England) Peter Ebdon	3
(China) Liang Wenbo	4

==== Section 7 ====
Last 128; Best of 7 frames
(England) Liam Highfield	4
(England) Jimmy Michie	3
(Hong Kong) Marco Fu	w/o
(England) Danny Douane	w/d
(England) Andy Hicks	3
(Belgium) Luca Brecel	4
(Scotland) Anthony McGill	4
(England) Oliver Brown	0
(England) Tom Ford	4
(England) Tony Knowles	2
(Wales) Michael White	4
(England) Andrew Norman	2
(England) Joe Jogia	w/d
(England) Jamie O'Neill	w/o
(England) Mike Dunn	4
(Germany) Jürgen Kesseler	1

Last 64; Best of 7 frames
(England) Liam Highfield	3
(Hong Kong) Marco Fu	4
(Belgium) Luca Brecel	4
(Scotland) Anthony McGill	3
(England) Tom Ford	3
(Wales) Michael White	4
(England) Jamie O'Neill	2
(England) Mike Dunn	4

Last 32; Best of 7 frames
(Hong Kong) Marco Fu	4
(Belgium) Luca Brecel	3
(Wales) Michael White	4
(England) Mike Dunn	1

Last 16; Best of 7 frames
(Hong Kong) Marco Fu	2
(Wales) Michael White	4

==== Section 8 ====
Last 128; Best of 7 frames
(England) Andrew Higginson	4
(England) Reanne Evans	0
(Scotland) Alan McManus	4
(Netherlands) Gerrit bij de Leij	1
(Wales) Daniel Wells	4
(Germany) Thomas Cesal	0
(England) Steve Davis	4
(Belgium) Hans Blanckaert	1
(Wales) Dominic Dale	4
(Germany) Dieter Meier	0
(China) Liu Chuang	4
(Germany) Robert Drahn	0
(Northern Ireland) Gerard Greene	4
(Denmark) Rune Kampe	1
(Wales) Mark Williams	4
(Germany) Diana Schuler	0

Last 64; Best of 7 frames
(England) Andrew Higginson	4
(Scotland) Alan McManus	0
(Wales) Daniel Wells	2
(England) Steve Davis	4
(Wales) Dominic Dale	2
(China) Liu Chuang	4
(Northern Ireland) Gerard Greene	4
(Wales) Mark Williams	0

Last 32; Best of 7 frames
(England) Andrew Higginson	4
(England) Steve Davis	3
(China) Liu Chuang	3
(Northern Ireland) Gerard Greene	4

Last 16; Best of 7 frames
(England) Andrew Higginson	4
(Northern Ireland) Gerard Greene	2

=== Finals ===
Quarter-finals; Best of 7 frames		Semi-finals; Best of 7 frames		Final; Best of 7 frames
(England) Barry Hawkins	1
(Republic of Ireland) Ken Doherty	4	(Republic of Ireland) Ken Doherty	3
(Scotland) Marcus Campbell	4	(Scotland) Marcus Campbell	4
(England) Judd Trump	1			(Scotland) Marcus Campbell	4
(England) Mark Selby	2			(China) Liang Wenbo	0
(China) Liang Wenbo	4	(China) Liang Wenbo	4
(Wales) Michael White	2	(England) Andrew Higginson	1
(England) Andrew Higginson	4

== Century breaks ==
- 147 – Thanawat Thirapongpaiboon
- 147 – Mark Williams
- 142 – Andrew Higginson
- 135, 116 – Anthony Hamilton
- 133, 119, 107 – Ken Doherty
- 130, 111, 100 – Martin Gould
- 128, 115, 104 – Liang Wenbo
- 124, 121 – Jimmy Robertson
- 122, 108, 105, 104 – Stuart Bingham
- 121 – Jak Jones
- 118 – Marco Fu
- 117 – Jimmy White
- 116, 110 – Michael White
- 112 – Chen Zhe
- 111 – Liu Song
- 110, 106 – Neil Robertson
- 110 – Bjorn Haneveer
- 108 – Judd Trump
- 108 – James Wattana
- 106 – Shaun Murphy
- 105 – Ricky Walden
- 102 – Liu Chuang
- 102 – Martin O'Donnell
- 102 – Ben Woollaston
- 101 – Alfie Burden
- 101 – Peter Ebdon
- 100, 100 – Stephen Maguire

== Notes ==
- ^{a} Stevens retired due to illness.
