= Boonyarit Keattikun =

Thai snooker player

Personal information
- Born: 5 October 1995 (age 31) Nakhon Nayok, Thailand

Sport
- Country: Thailand
- Sport: Snooker
- Professional: 2016–2018
- Highest ranking: 93 (June 2017)

Boonyarit Keattikun (Thai: บุญญฤทธิ์ เกียรติกุล; born 5 October 1995 in Nakhon Nayok, Thailand) is a Thai former professional snooker player.

== Career ==
In 2015 Keattikun entered the World Under-21 Snooker Championships in Bucharest as the number 1 seed. Keattikun went on to reach the final and defeated Jamie Clarke 8–7 to win the championship. As a result, he was given a two-year card on the professional World Snooker Tour for the 2016–17 and 2017–18 seasons. He lost his first eight matches of the 2016/17 season, before beating Scott Donaldson 5–3 in German Masters qualifying. Keattikun lost 5–3 to Anthony Hamilton in the next round. His only other victory this year was at the Welsh Open, where he defeated 1997 world champion Ken Doherty 4–1, before losing by a reversal of this scoreline to Mark Allen.

== Performance and rankings timeline ==
Tournament	2014/ 15	2015/ 16	2016/ 17	2017/ 18
Ranking	(Note: He was an amateur.)		(Note: New players on the Main Tour don't have a ranking.)	91
Ranking tournaments
Riga Masters	Minor-Rank.		A	A
China Championship	Not Held		NR	A
Paul Hunter Classic	Minor-Rank.		WD	A
Indian Open	A	NH	LQ	1R
World Open	Not Held		LQ	LQ
European Masters	Not Held		LQ	LQ
English Open	Not Held		1R	1R
International Championship	A	A	LQ	LQ
Shanghai Masters	A	A	LQ	LQ
Northern Ireland Open	Not Held		1R	WD
UK Championship	A	A	1R	1R
Scottish Open	Not Held		1R	1R
German Masters	A	A	LQ	LQ
Shoot-Out	NR		1R	A
World Grand Prix	NR	DNQ	DNQ	DNQ
Welsh Open	A	A	2R	A
Gibraltar Open	NH	MR	A	A
Players Championship	DNQ	DNQ	DNQ	DNQ
China Open	A	A	LQ	A
World Championship	A	A	LQ	A
Non-ranking tournaments
Six-red World Championship	2R	QF	2R	A

Performance Table Legend
LQ	lost in the qualifying draw	#R	lost in the early rounds of the tournament (WR = Wildcard round, RR = Round robin)	QF	lost in the quarter-finals
SF	lost in the semi-finals	F	lost in the final	W	won the tournament
DNQ	did not qualify for the tournament	A	did not participate in the tournament	WD	withdrew from the tournament

NH / Not Held	means an event was not held.
NR / Non-Ranking Event	means an event is/was no longer a ranking event.
R / Ranking Event	means an event is/was a ranking event.
MR / Minor-Ranking Event	means an event is/was a minor-ranking event.

== Career finals ==
=== Pro-am finals: 1 (1 title) ===
Outcome	No.	Year	Championship	Opponent in the final	Score
Winner	1.	2016	Singapore Snooker Open	(Thailand) Noppon Saengkham	5–4

=== Amateur finals: 1 (1 title) ===
Outcome	No.	Year	Championship	Opponent in the final	Score
Winner	1.	2015	World Under-21 Snooker Championship	(Wales) Jamie Clarke	8–7
