= IBSF World Under-21 Snooker Championship =

Annual amateur snooker tournament

The IBSF World Under-21 Snooker Championship (also known as the World Amateur Under-21 Snooker Championship) is the premier non-professional junior snooker tournament in the world. The event series is sanctioned by the International Billiards and Snooker Federation and started from 1987.

Five winners of this men's junior event later won the World Snooker Championship: Ken Doherty, Peter Ebdon, Ronnie O'Sullivan, Neil Robertson, and Wu Yize.

Four winners of the women's event would later win the World Women's Snooker Championship: Baipat Siripaporn, Bai Yulu, Mink Nutcharut and Panchaya Channoi. Bi Zhu Qing would later win the 2011 WPA Women's World Nine-ball Championship.

== Results ==
=== Men ===
Year	Venue	Winner	Runner-up	Score
1987	Hastings, England	(England) Jonathan Birch	(England) Stefan Mazrocis	4–1
1988	Bangkok, Thailand	(England) Brian Morgan	(Malta) Jason Peplow	6–1
1989	Reykjavík, Iceland	(Republic of Ireland) Ken Doherty	(England) Jason Ferguson	11–5
1990	Brisbane, Australia	(England) Peter Ebdon	(England) Oliver King	11–9
1991	Bangalore, India	(England) Ronnie O'Sullivan	(Belgium) Patrick Delsemme	11–4
1992	Brunei	(Finland) Robin Hull	(Belgium) Patrick Delsemme	11–7
1993	Reykjavík, Iceland	(Iceland) Kristján Helgason	(Sri Lanka) Indika Dodangoda	11–7
1994	Helsinki, Finland	(Australia) Quinten Hann	(England) David Gray	11–10
1995	Singapore	(Scotland) Alan Burnett	(Thailand) Kwan Poomjang	11–6
1996	Johannesburg, South Africa	(Hong Kong) Chan Kwok Ming	(Finland) Risto Vayrynen	11–6
1997	Carlow, Ireland	(Hong Kong) Marco Fu	(Belgium) Bjorn Haneveer	11–7
1998	Rabat, Malta	(England) Luke Simmonds	(Republic of Ireland) Robert Murphy	11–2
1999	Cairo, Egypt	(Republic of Ireland) Rodney Goggins	(Netherlands) Rolf de Jong	11–4
2000	Bangalore, India	(England) Luke Fisher	(Scotland) Steven Bennie	11–5
2001	Stirling, Scotland	(England) Ricky Walden	(Northern Ireland) Sean O'Neill	11–5
2002	Riga, Latvia	(China) Ding Junhui	(Wales) David John	11–9
2003	Taupō, New Zealand	(Australia) Neil Robertson	(China) Liu Song	11–5
2004	Carlow, Ireland	(England) Gary Wilson	(Thailand) Kobkit Palajin	11–5
2005	Manama, Bahrain	(China) Liang Wenbo	(China) Tian Pengfei	11–9
2007	Goa, India	(England) Michael Georgiou	(China) Zhang Anda	11–6
2009	Kish, Iran	(Thailand) Noppon Saengkham	(Iran) Soheil Vahedi	9–8
2010	Letterkenny, Ireland	(England) Sam Craigie	(China) Li Hang	9–8
2011	Montreal, Canada	(Thailand) Thanawat Thirapongpaiboon	(Thailand) Noppon Saengkham	9–3
2012	Wuxi, China	(China) Lyu Haotian	(China) Zhu Yinghui	9–6
2013	Beijing, China	(China) Lu Ning	(China) Zhou Yuelong	9–4
2014	Al Fujairah, United Arab Emirates	(Iran) Hossein Vafaei	(Republic of Ireland) Josh Boileau	8–3
2015	Bucharest, Romania	(Thailand) Boonyarit Keattikun	(Wales) Jamie Clarke	8–7
2016	Mol, Belgium	(China) Xu Si	(Switzerland) Alexander Ursenbacher	6–5
2017	Beijing, China	(China) Fan Zhengyi	(China) Luo Honghao	7–6
2018	Jinan, China	(China) Wu Yize	(Thailand) Pongsakorn Chongjairak	6–4
2019	Qingdao, China	(China) Zhao Jianbo	(China) Pang Junxu	6–1
2021	Doha, Qatar	(Austria) Florian Nüßle	(Thailand) Taweesap Kongkitchertchoo	6–5
2022	Bucharest, Romania	(Wales) Liam Davies	(Poland) Antoni Kowalski	5–1
2023	Riyadh, Saudi Arabia	(Wales) Liam Davies	(Germany) Alexander Widau	5–2
2024	Bangalore, India	(Poland) Michał Szubarczyk	(Germany) Alexander Widau	5–1
2025	Manama, Bahrain	(Poland) Sebastian Milewski	(China) Pan Yiming	5–0

=== Women ===
Year	Venue	Winner	Runner-up	Score
2007	India	(China) Bi Zhu Qing	(Hong Kong) Ng On-yee	4–2
2014	Al Fujairah, United Arab Emirates	(Australia) Jessica Woods	(Thailand) Amornrat Uamduang	4–3
2015	Bucharest, Romania	(Thailand) Baipat Siripaporn	(Thailand) Mink Nutcharut	5–2
2016	Mol, Belgium	(Thailand) Mink Nutcharut	(Thailand) Baipat Siripaporn	5–4
2017	Beijing, China	(Thailand) Mink Nutcharut	(China) Xia Yuying	5–3
2018	Jinan, China	(Thailand) Mink Nutcharut	(China) Bai Yulu	4–2
2019	Qingdao, China	(China) Bai Yulu	(Thailand) Mink Nutcharut	4–0
2022	Bucharest, Romania	(Thailand) Panchaya Channoi	(India) Anupama Ramachandran	4–1
2023	Riyadh, Saudi Arabia	(India) Keerthana Pandian	(India) Anupama Ramachandran	3–2
2024	Bangalore, India	(India) Natasha Chethan	(Thailand) Narucha Phoemphul	3–2

== See also ==
- World Snooker Tour
- IBSF World Snooker Championship
- IBSF World Under-18 Snooker Championship
- World Open Under-16 Snooker Championships
